= 70th Minnesota Legislature =

1977 to 1978 legislative session

Seventieth Minnesota Legislature
←	69th Minnesota Legislature	71st Minnesota Legislature	→
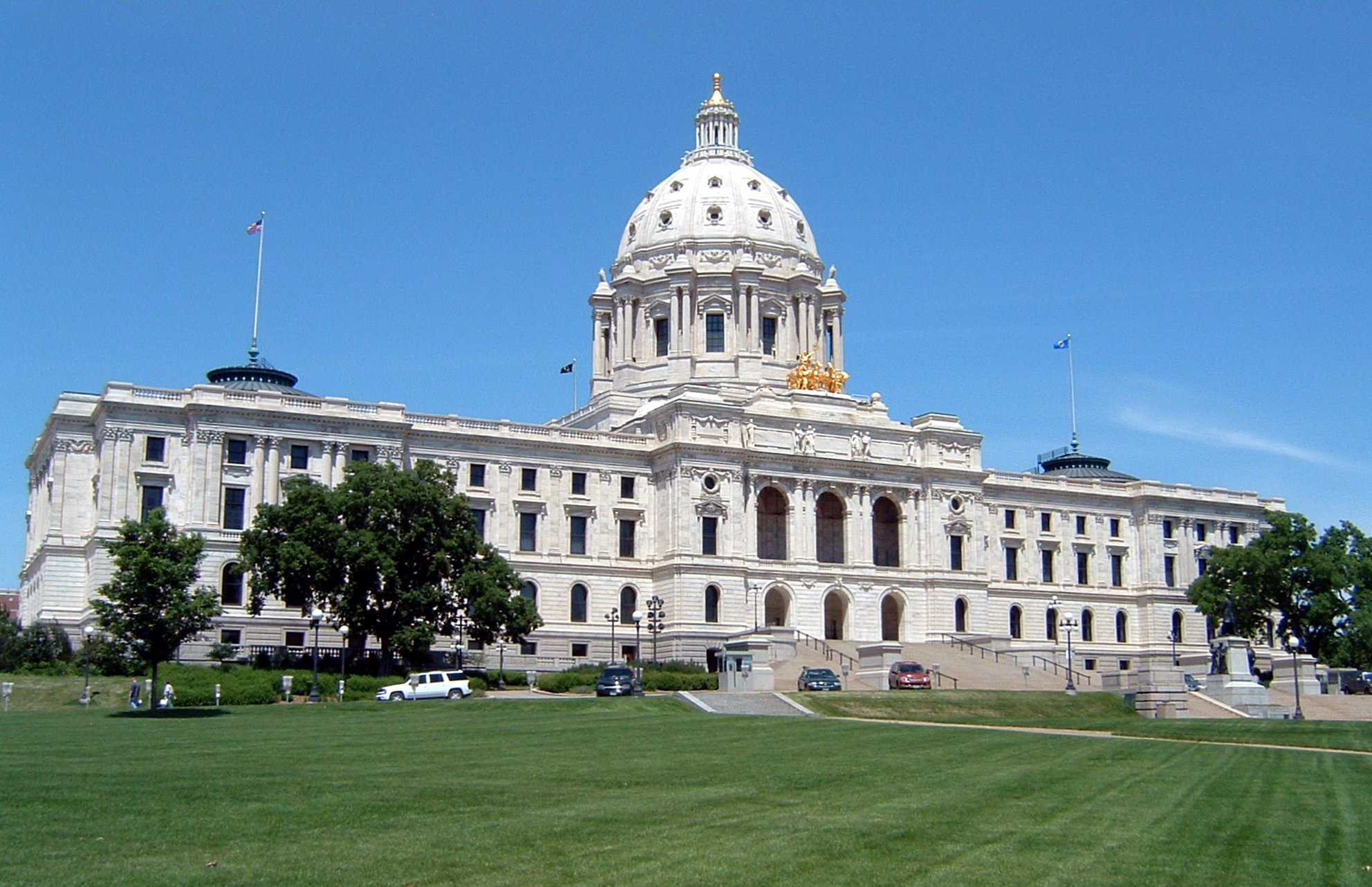

Overview
- Legislative body: Minnesota Legislature
- Jurisdiction: Minnesota, United States
- Meeting place: Minnesota State Capitol
- Term: January 4, 1977 – January 2, 1979
- Website: www.leg.state.mn.us

Minnesota State Senate
- Members: 67 Senators
- President: Edward J. Gearty
- Majority Leader: Nick Coleman
- Minority Leader: Robert O. Ashbach
- Party control: Democratic-Farmer-Labor Party

Minnesota House of Representatives
- Members: 134 Representatives
- Speaker: Martin O. Sabo
- Majority Leader: Irv Anderson
- Minority Leader: Henry J. Savelkoul
- Party control: Democratic-Farmer-Labor Party

The seventieth Minnesota Legislature first convened on January 4, 1977. The 67 members of the Minnesota Senate and the 134 members of the Minnesota House of Representatives were elected during the General Election of November 2, 1976. It was the first Minnesota Legislature since the thirty-eighth Minnesota Legislature whose members of the Minnesota Senate were chosen in partisan elections.

== Sessions ==
The legislature met in a regular session from January 4, 1977 to May 23, 1977. A continuation of the regular session was held between January 17, 1978 and March 24, 1978. There were no special sessions of the 70th Legislature.

== Party summary ==
Resignations and new members are discussed in the "Membership changes" section, below.

=== Senate ===
	Party (Shading indicates majority caucus)			Total	Vacant
	DFL	Ind.	IR	Total	Vacant
End of previous Legislature	37	1	28	66	1
Begin	48	0	18	66	1
February 15, 1977	49	0	18	67	0
November 1, 1977	48	0	18	66	1
December 9, 1977	48	0	19	67	0
December 1, 1978	47	0	19	66	1
December 29, 1978	47	0	20	67	0
Latest voting share	70%	0%	30%		
Beginning of the next Legislature	47	0	20	67	0

=== House of Representatives ===
	Party (Shading indicates majority caucus)		Total	Vacant
	DFL	IR	Total	Vacant
End of previous Legislature	103	31	134	0
Begin	104	30	134	0
February 15, 1977	103	30	133	1
March 18, 1977	103	31	134	0
July 31, 1977	102	31	133	1
August 1977 (Note: Al Wieser disaffiliated from the Minnesota Democratic-Farmer-Labor Party and joined the Independent-Republican Party of Minnesota in August 1977.)	101	32	133	1
October 11, 1977	101	33	134	0
November 4, 1977	100	33	133	1
December 19, 1977	100	34	134	0
March 21, 1978 (Note: Glen Sherwood disaffiliated from the Minnesota Democratic-Farmer-Labor Party and joined the Independent-Republican Party of Minnesota on March 21, 1978.)	99	35	134	0
Latest voting share	74%	26%		
Beginning of the next Legislature	67	67	134	0

== Leadership ==
=== Senate ===
President of the Senate
Edward J. Gearty (DFL-Minneapolis)

Senate Majority Leader
Nicholas D. Coleman (DFL-Saint Paul)

Senate Minority Leader
Robert O. Ashbach (IR-St. Paul)

=== House of Representatives ===
Speaker of the House
Martin O. Sabo (DFL-Minneapolis)

House Majority Leader
Irvin N. Anderson (DFL-International Falls)

House Minority Leader
Henry J. Savelkoul (IR-Albert Lea)

== Members ==
=== Senate ===
Name	District	City	Party
Anderson, Jerald C.	19	North Branch	DFL
Ashbach, Robert O.	48	Saint Paul	IR
Bang, Jr., Otto T.	39	Edina	IR
Benedict, Robert M.	38	Bloomington	DFL
Bernhagen, John J.	22	Hutchinson	IR
Borden, Winston W.	13	Brainerd	DFL
Brataas, Nancy	33	Rochester	IR
Chenoweth, John C.	66	Saint Paul	DFL
Chmielewski, Sr., Florian W.	14	Sturgeon Lake	DFL
Coleman, Nicholas D.	65	Saint Paul	DFL
Davies, II, John Thomas	60	Minneapolis	DFL
Dieterich, Neil	62	Saint Paul	DFL
Dunn, Robert G.	18	Princeton	IR
Engler, Steven	25	Randolph	IR
Frederick, Mel	32	West Concord	IR
Gearty, Edward J.	54	Minneapolis	DFL
Gunderson, Jerome O.	35	Mabel	DFL
Hanson, Marvin B.	01	Hallock	DFL
Hughes, Jerome M.	50	Saint Paul	DFL
Humphrey, III, Hubert H.	44	New Hope	DFL
Jensen, Carl A.	28	Sleepy Eye	IR
Johnson, Douglas J.	06	Cook	DFL
Keefe, Sr., John B.	40	Hopkins	IR
Keefe, Stephen	59	Minneapolis	DFL
Kirchner, William G.	37	Richfield	IR
Kleinbaum, Jack I.	17	Saint Cloud	DFL
Knaak, Delores J.	49	White Bear Lake	IR
Knoll, Franklin J.	61	Minneapolis	DFL
Knutson, Howard A.	53	Burnsville	IR
Laufenburger, Roger A.	34	Lewiston	DFL
Lessard, Bob B.	03	International Falls	DFL
Lewis, Sr., B. Robert	41	Saint Louis Park	DFL
Luther, William Paul	45	Brooklyn Center	DFL
McCutcheon, William W.	67	Saint Paul	DFL
Menning, Marion O.	26	Edgerton	DFL
Merriam, Eugene R.	47	Coon Rapids	DFL
Milton, John Watson	49	White Bear Lake	DFL
Moe, Roger D.	02	Ada	DFL
Nelson, Tom A.	31	Austin	DFL
Nichols, James W.	20	Lake Benton	DFL
Ogdahl, Sr., Harmon T.	58	Minneapolis	IR
Olhoft, Wayne	11	Herman	DFL
Olson, Howard D.	27	Saint James	DFL
Penny, Timothy Joseph	30	New Richland	DFL
Perpich, George F.	05	Chisholm	DFL
Peterson, Collin Clark	10	Detroit Lakes	DFL
Pillsbury, George Sturgis	42	Wayzata	IR
Purfeerst, Clarence Mark	24	Faribault	DFL
Renneke, Earl W.	23	Le Sueur	IR
Schaaf, David D.	46	Fridley	DFL
Schmitz, Robert J.	36	Jordan	DFL
Schrom, Ed	16	Albany	DFL
Setzepfandt, A. O.H.	21	Bird Island	DFL
Sieloff, Ronald B.	63	Saint Paul	IR
Sikorski, Gerald Edward	51	Stillwater	DFL
Sillers, Douglas H.	09	Moorhead	IR
Solon, Sam George	07	Duluth	DFL
Spear, Allan H.	57	Minneapolis	DFL
Staples, Emily Anne	43	Plymouth	DFL
Stokowski, Eugene E.	55	Minneapolis	DFL
Strand, Roger Ernest	15	Cyrus	DFL
Stumpf, Jr., Peter P.	64	Saint Paul	DFL
Tennessen, Robert J.	56	Minneapolis	DFL
Ueland, Jr., Arnulf	29	Mankato	IR
Ulland, James E.	08	Duluth	IR
Vega, Conrado M.	52	South Saint Paul	DFL
Wegener, Myrton O.	12	Bertha	DFL
Willet, Gerald L.	04	Park Rapids	DFL

=== House of Representatives ===
Name	District	City	Party
Abeln, Lyle G.	38B	Bloomington	DFL
Adams, Leo G.	44B	New Hope	DFL
Albrecht, Raymond John	23A	Brownton	IR
Anderson, Bruce W.	26A	Slayton	DFL
Anderson, Delbert F.	15A	Starbuck	IR
Anderson, Glen H.	15B	Bellingham	DFL
Anderson, Irvin N.	03A	International Falls	DFL
Anderson, Robert A.	10B	Ottertail	IR
Arlandson, John R.	41A	Golden Valley	DFL
Battaglia, David Peter	06B	Two Harbors	DFL
Beauchamp, David J.	09A	Moorhead	DFL
Begich, Joseph R.	06A	Eveleth	DFL
Berg, Thomas K.	56B	Minneapolis	DFL
Berglin, Linda Lee	59A	Minneapolis	DFL
Berkelman, Thomas R.	08B	Duluth	DFL
Biersdorf, John S.	32A	Owatonna	IR
Birnstihl, Orville E.	24B	Faribault	DFL
Brandl, John E.	61A	Minneapolis	DFL
Braun, Arthur Michael	01A	Greenbush	DFL
Brinkman, Bernard J.	16B	Richmond	DFL
Byrne, Margaret Mary	64B	Saint Paul	DFL
Carlson, Sr., Arne Helge	58B	Minneapolis	IR
Carlson, Douglas W.	14A	Sandstone	IR
Carlson, Sr., Lyndon R.	44A	Brooklyn Center	DFL
Casserly, James R.	56A	Minneapolis	DFL
Clark, Janet H.	60A	Minneapolis	DFL
Clawson, John T.	19A	Center City	DFL
Cohen, Richard J.	63B	Saint Paul	DFL
Corbid, John R.	01B	Oklee	DFL
Cummiskey, David R.	29A	Mankato	DFL
Dahl, Harold J.	22B	Howard Lake	DFL
Dean, William D.	58A	Minneapolis	IR
Den Ouden, Gaylin L.R.	21B	Prinsburg	IR
Eckstein, Anton Joseph	28B	New Ulm	DFL
Eken, Willis Roy	02B	Twin Valley	DFL
Ellingson, Robert L.	45B	Brooklyn Center	DFL
Enebo, Stanley A.	60B	Minneapolis	DFL
Erickson, Wendell O.	26B	Hills	IR
Esau, Gilbert D.	28A	Mountain Lake	IR
Evans, James	10A	Detroit Lakes	IR
Ewald, Douglas	40A	Minnetonka	IR
Faricy, Ray W.	63A	Saint Paul	DFL
Fjoslien, David O.	11B	Brandon	IR
Forsythe, Mary M.	39A	Edina	IR
Friedrich, Donald L.	32B	Rochester	IR
Fudro, Stanley J.	55A	Minneapolis	DFL
Fugina, Peter X.	05A	Virginia	DFL
George, Michael J.	50A	Mahtomedi	DFL
Gunter, Clarence L.	21A	Raymond	DFL
Hanson, Walter R.	62B	Saint Paul	DFL
Haugerud, Neil Sherman	35A	Preston	DFL
Heinitz, Orlando Jacob	43A	Plymouth	IR
Hokanson, Shirley A.	37A	Richfield	DFL
Jacobs, Joel	47A	Coon Rapids	DFL
Jaros, Mike	07B	Duluth	DFL
Jensen, Robert C.	53B	Farmington	DFL
Johnson, Carl M.	23B	Saint Peter	DFL
Jude, Thaddeus	42A	Mound	DFL
Kahn, Phyllis L.	57A	Minneapolis	DFL
Kaley, John R.	33A	Rochester	IR
Kalis, Henry J.	30A	Walters	DFL
Kelly, Randy Cameron	66B	Saint Paul	DFL
Kelly, William Nelson	02A	East Grand Forks	DFL
Kempe, Arnold E.	67A	West Saint Paul	DFL
Kempe, Raymond J.	53A	West Saint Paul	DFL
King, Dwayne A.	43B	Golden Valley	DFL
Knickerbocker, Gerald C.	40B	Hopkins	IR
Kostohryz, Sr., Richard J.	50B	North Saint Paul	DFL
Kroening, Carl W.	54A	Minneapolis	DFL
Kvam, Adolph Leonard	22A	Litchfield	IR
Laidig, Gary W.	51A	Stillwater	IR
Langseth, Keith L.	09B	Glyndon	DFL
Lehto, Arlene Ione	08A	Duluth	DFL
Lemke, Richard R.	34A	Lake City	DFL
Mangan, Thomas J.	19B	Anoka	DFL
Mann, George L.	27A	Windom	DFL
McCarron, Paul	46A	Unknown	DFL
McCollar, Maurice D.	49B	White Bear Lake	DFL
McDonald, Kenneth James	36A	Watertown	IR
McEachern, Robert O.	18B	Saint Michael	DFL
Metzen, James P.	52A	South Saint Paul	DFL
Moe, Donald M.	65B	Saint Paul	DFL
Munger, Sr., Willard M.	07A	Duluth	DFL
Murphy, Mary Catherine	14B	Hermantown	DFL
Neisen, Howard J.	49A	Mounds View	DFL
Nelsen, Bruce G.	12A	Staples	IR
Nelsen, Jr., Marlin B.	13B	Aitkin	DFL
Nelson, Ken G.	59B	Minneapolis	DFL
Niehaus, Sr., Joseph T.	16A	Sauk Centre	IR
Norton, Fred C.	65A	Saint Paul	DFL
Novak, Steven G.	48A	New Brighton	DFL
Onnen, Tony D.	22B	Cokato	IR
Osthoff, C. Thomas	64A	Saint Paul	DFL
Patton, Al W.	17A	Sartell	DFL
Pehler, James C.	17B	Saint Cloud	DFL
Peterson, Darrel L.	27B	Fairmont	IR
Petrafeso, Paul R.	41B	Saint Louis Park	DFL
Pleasant, Ray O.	39B	Bloomington	IR
Prahl, Norman Rudolph	03B	Grand Rapids	DFL
Redalen, Elton R.	35A	Fountain	IR
Reding, Leo John	31B	Austin	DFL
Rice, James Isaac	54B	Minneapolis	DFL
Rose, John T.	48B	Roseville	IR
Sabo, Martin Olav	57B	Minneapolis	DFL
Samuelson, Donald B.	13A	Brainerd	DFL
Sarna, John J.	55B	Minneapolis	DFL
Savelkoul, Henry J.	31A	Albert Lea	IR
Scheid, Linda J.	45A	Brooklyn Park	DFL
Schulz, Victor H.	25B	Goodhue	DFL
Searle, Sr., Rodney Newell	30B	Waseca	IR
Searles, Robert L.	42B	Wayzata	IR
Setzepfandt, A. O.H.	21B	Bird Island	DFL
Sherwood, Glen A.	04B	Pine River	IR
Sieben, Jr., Harry A.	52B	Hastings	DFL
Sieben, Michael R.	51B	Newport	DFL
Simoneau, Wayne A.	46B	Fridley	DFL
Skoglund, Wesley J.	61B	Minneapolis	DFL
Smogard, Ellsworth G.	20A	Madison	DFL
Spanish, John J.	05B	Hibbing	DFL
St. Onge, Doug J.	04A	Bemidji	DFL
Stanton, Russell P.	20B	Marshall	DFL
Stoa, Tom	34B	Winona	DFL
Suss, Ted L.	36B	New Prague	DFL
Swanson, James C.	37B	Richfield	DFL
Tomlinson, John D.	67B	Saint Paul	DFL
Vanasek, Robert E.	24A	New Prague	DFL
Voss, Gordon Owen	47B	Blaine	DFL
Waldorf, Eugene T.	66A	Saint Paul	DFL
Welch, Richard J.	18A	Cambridge	DFL
Wenstrom, Gene R.	11A	Elbow Lake	DFL
Wenzel, Stephen G.	12B	Little Falls	DFL
White, Jim F.	25A	Farmington	DFL
Wieser, Jr., Al W.	35B	La Crescent	IR
Wigley, Richard E.	29B	Lake Crystal	IR
Williamson, Bruce D.	38A	Bloomington	DFL
Wynia, Ann	62A	Saint Paul	DFL
Zubay, Kenneth Peter	33B	Rochester	IR

== Membership changes ==
=== Senate ===
District	Vacated by	Reason for change	Successor	Date successor seated
21	None	Incumbent DFLer and then-Senate President Alec G. Olson had been reelected during the General Election of 1976. However, during the same election cycle, U.S. Senator Walter Mondale was elected Vice President of the United States, causing Mondale to resign from the U.S. Senate. Governor Wendell Anderson proceeded to appoint himself to Mondale's vacated seat, which caused Lieutenant Governor Rudy Perpich to succeed to the office of Governor, and hence created a vacancy in the office of Lieutenant Governor. As per the provisions of the Minnesota Constitution, Olson, as the last-elected President of the Senate, then succeeded to the office of Lieutenant Governor, causing him to automatically resign his seat in the Minnesota Senate effective December 29, 1976. Thus, this seat was already vacant when the 70th Legislature convened.	A. O.H. Setzepfandt (DFL)	February 15, 1977
49	John Watson Milton (DFL)	Milton resigned effective November 1, 1977.	Delores J. Knaak (IR)	December 9, 1977
13	Winston W. Borden (DFL)	Borden resigned to become the Executive Secretary of the Minnesota Association of Commerce and Industry.	David E. Rued (IR)	December 29, 1978

=== House of Representatives ===
District	Vacated by	Reason for change	Successor	Date successor seated
21B	A. O.H. Setzepfandt (DFL)	Setzepfandt resigned from the Minnesota House of Representatives after having won the special election to represent district 21 in the Minnesota Senate.	Gaylin L.R. Den Ouden (IR)	March 18, 1977
22B	Harold J. Dahl (DFL)	Dahl resigned on July 31, 1977 to accept appointment as a judge.	Tony Onnen (IR)	October 11, 1977
35A	Neil Sherman Haugerud (DFL)	Haugerud resigned on November 4, 1977, to accept appointment by President Jimmy Carter to serve on the Upper Mississippi River Basin Commission.	Elton R. Redalen (IR)	December 19, 1977
