= 72nd Minnesota Legislature =

1981 and 1982 legislative sessions

Seventy-second Minnesota Legislature
| ← | 71st Minnesota Legislature | 73rd Minnesota Legislature | → |
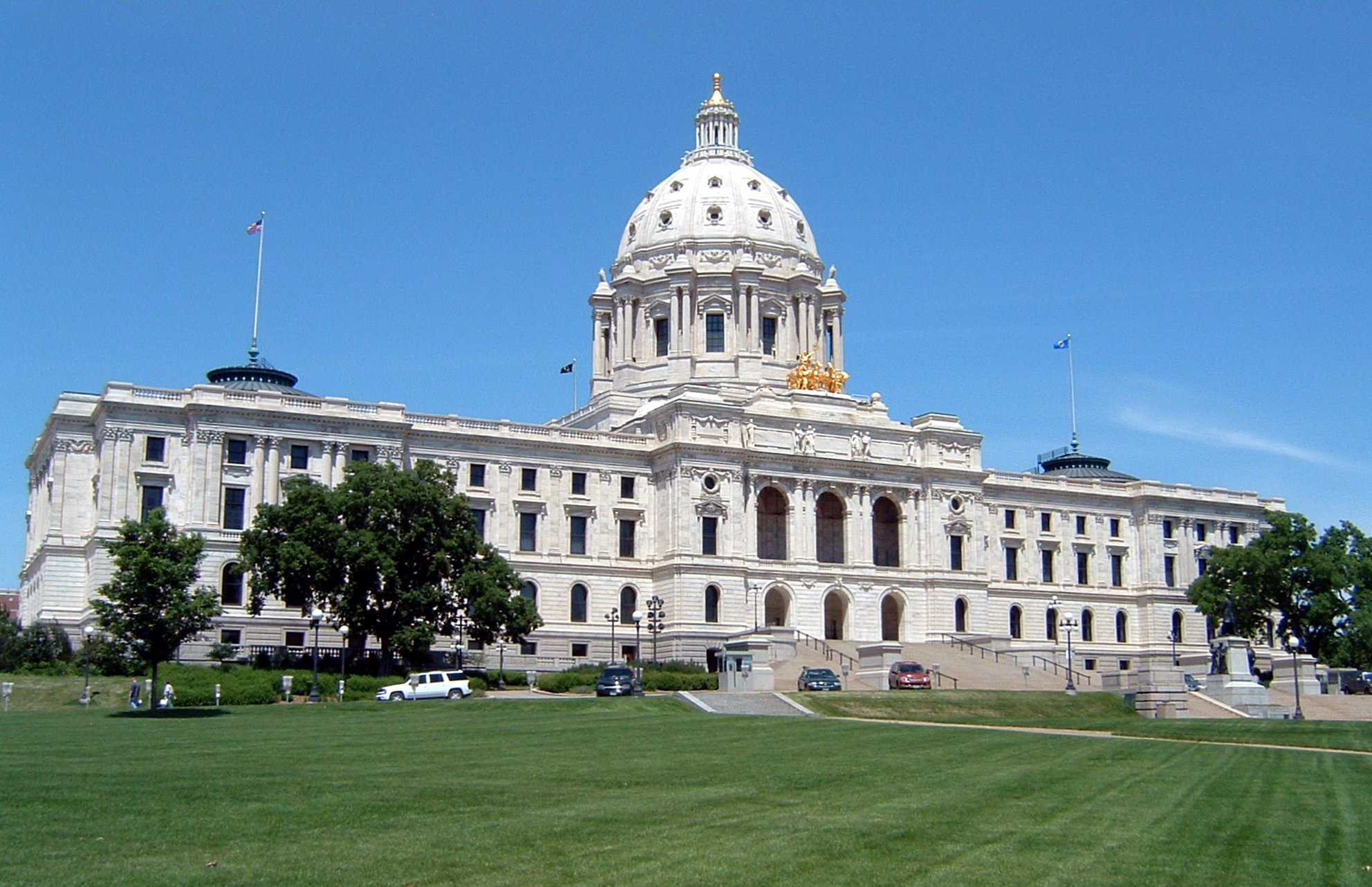

Overview
- Legislative body: Minnesota Legislature
- Jurisdiction: Minnesota, United States
- Meeting place: Minnesota State Capitol
- Term: January 6, 1981 – January 4, 1983
- Website: www.leg.state.mn.us

Minnesota State Senate
- Members: 67 Senators
- President: John T. Davies
- Majority Leader: Roger Moe
- Minority Leader: Robert O. Ashbach
- Party control: Democratic-Farmer-Labor Party

Minnesota House of Representatives
- Members: 134 Representatives
- Speaker: Harry A. Sieben
- Majority Leader: Willis Eken
- Minority Leader: Glen Sherwood, David M. Jennings
- Party control: Democratic-Farmer-Labor Party

The seventy-second Minnesota Legislature first convened on January 6, 1981. The 67 members of the Minnesota Senate and the 134 members of the Minnesota House of Representatives were elected during the general election of November 4, 1980.

== Sessions ==
The legislature met in a regular session from January 6, 1981, to May 18, 1981. Three special sessions were also convened in 1981. The first of these special sessions was convened on June 6 to consider the state budget, appropriations, and a tax bill. The second of the special sessions was convened on July 1 and July 2 to consider a short-term borrowing law and to correct errors in the laws enacted during the regular session. The third special session of 1981 was convened from December 1, 1981, to January 18, 1982, to consider reducing appropriations.

A continuation of the regular session was held between January 12, 1982, and March 19, 1982. Three additional special sessions were also held in 1982. The first of these special sessions was convened on March 30 to consider changes to the state's unemployment and workers' compensation laws. The second was convened on July 9 to consider authorizing Albert Lea to spend federal revenue sharing funds, and to consider providing employment aid to the Iron Range from the Northeast Minnesota Economic Protection Fund. The final special session of the 72nd Minnesota Legislature met from December 7, 1982, to December 10, 1982, and considered reductions in appropriations, reducing employer and increasing employee contributions to various retirement funds, adding two members to the investment advisory board, and so forth.

== Party summary ==
Resignations and new members are discussed in the "Membership changes" section, below.

=== Senate ===
| | Party (Shading indicates majority caucus) | | Total | Vacant |
| | DFL | IR | Total | Vacant |
|---|---|---|---|---|
| End of previous Legislature | 44 | 21 | 65 | 2 |
| Begin | 45 | 22 | 67 | 0 |
| April 10, 1981 | 44 | 22 | 66 | 1 |
| May 15, 1981 | 44 | 23 | 67 | 0 |
| Latest voting share | 66% | 34% | | |
| Beginning of the next Legislature | 42 | 25 | 67 | 0 |

=== House of Representatives ===
| | Party (Shading indicates majority caucus) | | Total | Vacant |
| | DFL | IR | Total | Vacant |
|---|---|---|---|---|
| End of previous Legislature | 67 | 66 | 133 | 1 |
| Begin | 70 | 64 | 134 | 0 |
| June 1, 1981 | 70 | 63 | 133 | 1 |
| July 17, 1981 | 70 | 64 | 134 | 0 |
| Latest voting share | 52% | 48% | | |
| Beginning of the next Legislature | 77 | 57 | 134 | 0 |

== Leadership ==
=== Senate ===
President of the Senate
John T. Davies (DFL-Minneapolis)

Senate Majority Leader
Roger Moe (DFL-Ada)

Senate Minority Leader
Robert O. Ashbach (IR-St. Paul)

=== House of Representatives ===
Speaker of the House
Harry A. Sieben (DFL-Hastings)

House Majority Leader
Willis Eken (DFL-Twin Valley)

House Minority Leader
Until February 1982 Glen Sherwood (IR-Pine River) (Note: Although he retained his seat in the House of Representatives, Glen Sherwood resigned as the House Minority Leader in February 1982, in order to (unsuccessfully) run for the Independent Republican nomination for Governor of Minnesota in that year's gubernatorial election.)
From February 1982 David M. Jennings (IR-Truman)

== Members ==
=== Senate ===
| Name | District | City | Party |
|---|---|---|---|
| Ashbach, Robert O. | 48 | St. Paul | IR |
| Bang, Otto T. | 39 | Edina | IR |
| Belanger, William | 38 | Bloomington | IR |
| Benson, Duane | 35 | Lanesboro | IR |
| Berg, Charlie | 15 | Chokio | IR |
| Berglin, Linda | 59 | Minneapolis | DFL |
| Bernhagen, John | 22 | Hutchinson | IR |
| Bertram, Joe | 16 | Paynesville | DFL |
| Brataas, Nancy | 33 | Rochester | IR |
| Chmielewski, Florian | 14 | Sturgeon Lake | DFL |
| Dahl, Gregory | 49 | White Bear Lake | DFL |
| Davies, John T. | 60 | Minneapolis | DFL |
| Davis, Chuck | 18 | Princeton | DFL |
| Dicklich, Ron | 05 | Hibbing | DFL |
| Dieterich, Neil | 62 | St. Paul | DFL |
| Engler, Steven | 25 | Randolph | IR |
| Frank, Don | 46 | Spring Lake Park | DFL |
| Frederick, Mel | 32 | West Concord | IR |
| Frederickson, Dennis | 28 | New Ulm | IR |
| Hanson, Marv | 01 | Hallock | DFL |
| Hughes, Jerome M. | 50 | Maplewood | DFL |
| Humphrey, Skip | 44 | New Hope | DFL |
| Johnson, Doug | 06 | Tower | DFL |
| Kamrath, Randy P. | 20 | Canby | IR |
| Keefe, John B. | 40 | Hopkins | IR |
| Knoll, Franklin J. | 61 | Minneapolis | DFL |
| Knutson, Howard A. | 53 | Burnsville | IR |
| Kroening, Carl | 54 | Minneapolis | DFL |
| Kronebusch, Patricia Louise | 34 | Rollingstone | IR |
| Langseth, Keith | 09 | Glyndon | DFL |
| Lantry, Marilyn | 67 | St. Paul | DFL |
| Lessard, Bob | 03 | International Falls | DFL |
| Lindgren, Steven O. | 37 | Richfield | IR |
| Luther, Bill | 45 | Brooklyn Park | DFL |
| Menning, Mike | 26 | Edgerton | DFL |
| Merriam, Gene | 47 | Coon Rapids | DFL |
| Moe, Donald | 65 | St. Paul | DFL |
| Moe, Roger | 02 | Ada | DFL |
| Nelson, Tom A. | 31 | Austin | DFL |
| Nichols, James W. | 20 | Lake Benton | DFL |
| Olhoft, Wayne | 11 | Herman | DFL |
| Pehler, Jim | 17 | St. Cloud | DFL |
| Penny, Tim | 30 | New Richland | DFL |
| Peterson, Collin Clark | 10 | Detroit Lakes | DFL |
| Peterson, Darrel L. | 27 | Fairmont | IR |
| Peterson, Randolph W. | 19 | Wyoming | DFL |
| Petty, Eric D. | 58 | Minneapolis | DFL |
| Pillsbury, George Sturgis | 42 | Wayzata | IR |
| Purfeerst, Clarence | 24 | Faribault | DFL |
| Ramstad, Jim | 43 | Plymouth | IR |
| Renneke, Earl | 23 | Le Sueur | IR |
| Rued, David E. | 13 | Aitkin | IR |
| Schmitz, Robert J. | 36 | Jordan | DFL |
| Setzepfandt, A. O.H. | 21 | Bird Island | DFL |
| Sieloff, Ron | 63 | St. Paul | IR |
| Sikorski, Gerry | 51 | Stillwater | DFL |
| Solon, Sam | 07 | Duluth | DFL |
| Spear, Allan | 57 | Minneapolis | DFL |
| Stern, Irving M. | 41 | St. Louis Park | DFL |
| Stokowski, Anne K. | 55 | Minneapolis | DFL |
| Stumpf, Jr., Peter P. | 64 | St. Paul | DFL |
| Taylor, Glen | 29 | Mankato | IR |
| Tennessen, Robert J. | 56 | Minneapolis | DFL |
| Ulland, James E. | 08 | Duluth | IR |
| Vega, Conrad | 52 | South St. Paul | DFL |
| Waldorf, Gene | 66 | St. Paul | DFL |
| Wegener, Myrton O. | 12 | Bertha | DFL |
| Willet, Gerald | 04 | Park Rapids | DFL |

=== House of Representatives ===
| Name | District | City | Party |
|---|---|---|---|
| Aasness, Paul D. | 11A | Wendell | IR |
| Ainley, Jr., John A. | 04A | Park Rapids | IR |
| Anderson, Bob | 10B | Ottertail | IR |
| Anderson, Bruce W. | 26A | Slayton | DFL |
| Anderson, Glen H. | 15B | Bellingham | DFL |
| Anderson, Irvin N. | 03A | International Falls | DFL |
| Battaglia, David Peter | 06B | Two Harbors | DFL |
| Begich, Joseph | 06A | Eveleth | DFL |
| Berkelman, Thomas R. | 08B | Duluth | DFL |
| Blatz, Kathleen | 38A | Bloomington | IR |
| Brandl, John | 61A | Minneapolis | DFL |
| Brinkman, Bernard J. | 16B | Richmond | DFL |
| Byrne, Margaret Mary | 64B | St. Paul | DFL |
| Carlson, Doug | 14A | Sandstone | IR |
| Carlson, Lyndon | 44A | Crystal | DFL |
| Clark, Janet H. | 60A | Minneapolis | DFL |
| Clark, Karen | 59A | Minneapolis | DFL |
| Clawson, John T. | 19A | Center City | DFL |
| Dahlvang, George C. | 54A | Minneapolis | DFL |
| Dean, William D. | 58A | Minneapolis | IR |
| Dempsey, Terry | 28B | New Ulm | IR |
| Den Ouden, Gaylin | 21B | Prinsburg | IR |
| Drew, John | 63B | St. Paul | IR |
| Eken, Willis | 02B | Twin Valley | DFL |
| Elioff, Dominic J. | 05A | Virginia | DFL |
| Ellingson, Robert L. | 45B | Brooklyn Center | DFL |
| Erickson, Wendell O. | 26B | Hills | IR |
| Esau, Gilbert D. | 28A | Mountain Lake | IR |
| Evans, James | 10A | Detroit Lakes | IR |
| Ewald, Douglas R. | 40A | Minnetonka | IR |
| Fjoslien, David O. | 11B | Brandon | IR |
| Forsythe, Mary | 39A | Edina | IR |
| Frerichs, Don | 32B | Rochester | IR |
| Friedrich, Donald L. | 32B | Rochester | IR |
| Greenfield, Lee | 57B | Minneapolis | DFL |
| Gruenes, Dave | 17B | St. Cloud | IR |
| Gustafson, Ben E. | 07B | Duluth | DFL |
| Halberg, Chuck | 53B | Burnsville | IR |
| Hanson, Walter R. | 62B | St. Paul | DFL |
| Harens, Thomas J. | 65B | St. Paul | DFL |
| Hauge, Earl | 15A | Glenwood | DFL |
| Haukoos, Bob | 31A | Albert Lea | IR |
| Heap, Jim | 43B | Robbinsdale | IR |
| Heinitz, Orlando Jacob | 43A | Plymouth | IR |
| Himle, John | 39B | Bloomington | IR |
| Hoberg, Dwaine | 09A | Moorhead | IR |
| Hokanson, Shirley A. | 37A | Richfield | DFL |
| Hokr, Dorothy | 44B | New Hope | IR |
| Jacobs, Joel | 47A | Coon Rapids | DFL |
| Jennings, David M. | 27B | Truman | IR |
| Johnson, Carl M. | 23B | St. Peter | DFL |
| Johnson, Dean | 21A | Willmar | IR |
| Jude, Tad | 42A | Mound | DFL |
| Kahn, Phyllis | 57A | Minneapolis | DFL |
| Kaley, John R. | 33A | Rochester | IR |
| Kalis, Henry | 30A | Walters | DFL |
| Kelly, Randy | 66B | St. Paul | DFL |
| Knickerbocker, Jerry | 40B | Minnetonka | IR |
| Kostohryz, Dick | 50B | North St. Paul | DFL |
| Laidig, Gary | 51A | Stillwater | IR |
| Lehto, Arlene Ione | 08A | Duluth | DFL |
| Lemen, Robert N. | 03B | Grand Rapids | IR |
| Kvam, Adolph Leonard | 22A | Litchfield | IR |
| Levi, Connie | 50A | Dellwood | IR |
| Long, Dee | 56B | Minneapolis | DFL |
| Ludeman, Cal | 20B | Tracy | IR |
| Luknic, Marsha Johnson | 24B | Faribault | IR |
| Mann, George | 27A | Windom | DFL |
| Marsh, Marcus M. | 17A | Sauk Rapids | IR |
| McCarron, Paul | 46A | Spring Lake Park | DFL |
| McDonald, K. J. | 36A | Watertown | IR |
| McEachern, Bob | 18B | St. Michael | DFL |
| Mehrkens, Lyle | 25B | Red Wing | IR |
| Metzen, James P. | 52A | South St. Paul | DFL |
| Minne, Lona | 05B | Hibbing | DFL |
| Munger, Willard | 07A | Duluth | DFL |
| Murphy, Mary | 14B | Hermantown | DFL |
| Nelsen, Bruce G. | 12A | Staples | IR |
| Nelson, Ken | 59B | Minneapolis | DFL |
| Niehaus, Sr., Joseph T. | 16A | Sauk Centre | IR |
| Norton, Fred C. | 65A | St. Paul | DFL |
| Novak, Steve | 48A | New Brighton | DFL |
| Nysether, Myron E. | 01A | Roseau | IR |
| O'Connor, Rich | 66A | St. Paul | DFL |
| Ogren, Paul Anders | 13B | Aitkin | DFL |
| Olsen, Sally | 41A | Saint Louis Park | IR |
| Onnen, Tony | 22B | Cokato | IR |
| Osthoff, Tom | 64A | St. Paul | DFL |
| Otis, Todd | 58B | Minneapolis | DFL |
| Peterson, Bill | 38B | Bloomington | IR |
| Peterson, Donna C. | 60B | Minneapolis | DFL |
| Piepho, Mark J. | 29A | Mankato | IR |
| Pogemiller, Larry | 55A | Minneapolis | DFL |
| Redalen, Elton | 35A | Fountain | IR |
| Reding, Leo John | 31B | Austin | DFL |
| Rees, Tom | 36B | Elko | IR |
| Reif, Robert W. | 49B | White Bear Lake | IR |
| Rice, Jim | 54B | Minneapolis | DFL |
| Rodriguez, Carolyn Jane | 53A | Apple Valley | DFL |
| Rodriguez, Frank J. | 67A | St. Paul | DFL |
| Rose, John | 48B | Roseville | IR |
| Rothenberg, Elliot C. | 41B | St. Louis Park | IR |
| Samuelson, Donald B. | 13A | Brainerd | DFL |
| Sarna, John | 55B | Minneapolis | DFL |
| Schafer, Gary | 23A | Gibbon | IR |
| Schoenfeld, Jerry E. | 30B | Waseca | DFL |
| Schreiber, Bill | 45A | Brooklyn Park | IR |
| Searles, Robert L. | 42B | Wayzata | IR |
| Shea, Tom J. | 32A | Owatonna | DFL |
| Sherman, Tim | 34B | Winona | IR |
| Sherwood, Glen A. | 04B | Pine River | IR |
| Sieben, Harry A. | 52B | Hastings | DFL |
| Sieben, Michael R. | 51B | Newport | DFL |
| Simoneau, Wayne | 46B | Fridley | DFL |
| Skoglund, Wes | 61B | Minneapolis | DFL |
| Stadum, Tony | 02A | Ada | IR |
| Staten, Sr., Randolph Wilbert | 56A | Minneapolis | DFL |
| Stowell, Warren | 34A | Lewiston | IR |
| Stumpf, LeRoy A. | 01B | Plummer | DFL |
| Sviggum, Steve | 25A | Kenyon | IR |
| Swanson, James C. | 37B | Richfield | DFL |
| Tomlinson, John D. | 67B | St. Paul | DFL |
| Valan, Merlyn Orville | 09B | Moorhead | IR |
| Valento, Don | 49A | Little Canada | IR |
| Vanasek, Robert | 24A | New Prague | DFL |
| Vellenga, Kathleen | 63A | St. Paul | DFL |
| Voss, Gordon | 47B | Blaine | DFL |
| Weaver, John L. | 19B | Anoka | IR |
| Welch, Richard J. | 18A | Cambridge | DFL |
| Welker, Ray | 20A | Montevideo | IR |
| Wenzel, Steve | 12B | Little Falls | DFL |
| Wieser, Jr., Al W. | 35B | La Crescent | IR |
| Wigley, Richard E. | 29B | Lake Crystal | IR |
| Wynia, Ann | 62A | St. Paul | DFL |
| Zubay, Kenneth Peter | 33B | Rochester | IR |

== Membership changes ==
=== Senate ===
| District | Vacated by | Reason for change | Successor | Date successor seated |
|---|---|---|---|---|
| 20 | James W. Nichols (DFL) | Resigned April 10, 1981, citing the needs of his family and farm. | Randy P. Kamrath (IR) | May 15, 1981 |

=== House of Representatives ===
| District | Vacated by | Reason for change | Successor | Date successor seated |
|---|---|---|---|---|
| 32B | Donald L. Friedrich (IR) | Appointed to other office circa June 1, 1981. | Don Frerichs (IR) | July 17, 1981 |

== Notes ==
| Preceded by Seventy-first Minnesota Legislature | Seventy-second Minnesota Legislature; 1981—1982 | Succeeded by Seventy-third Minnesota Legislature |
