= 73rd Minnesota Legislature =

1983 and 1984 legislative sessions

Seventy-third Minnesota Legislature
←	72nd Minnesota Legislature	74th Minnesota Legislature	→
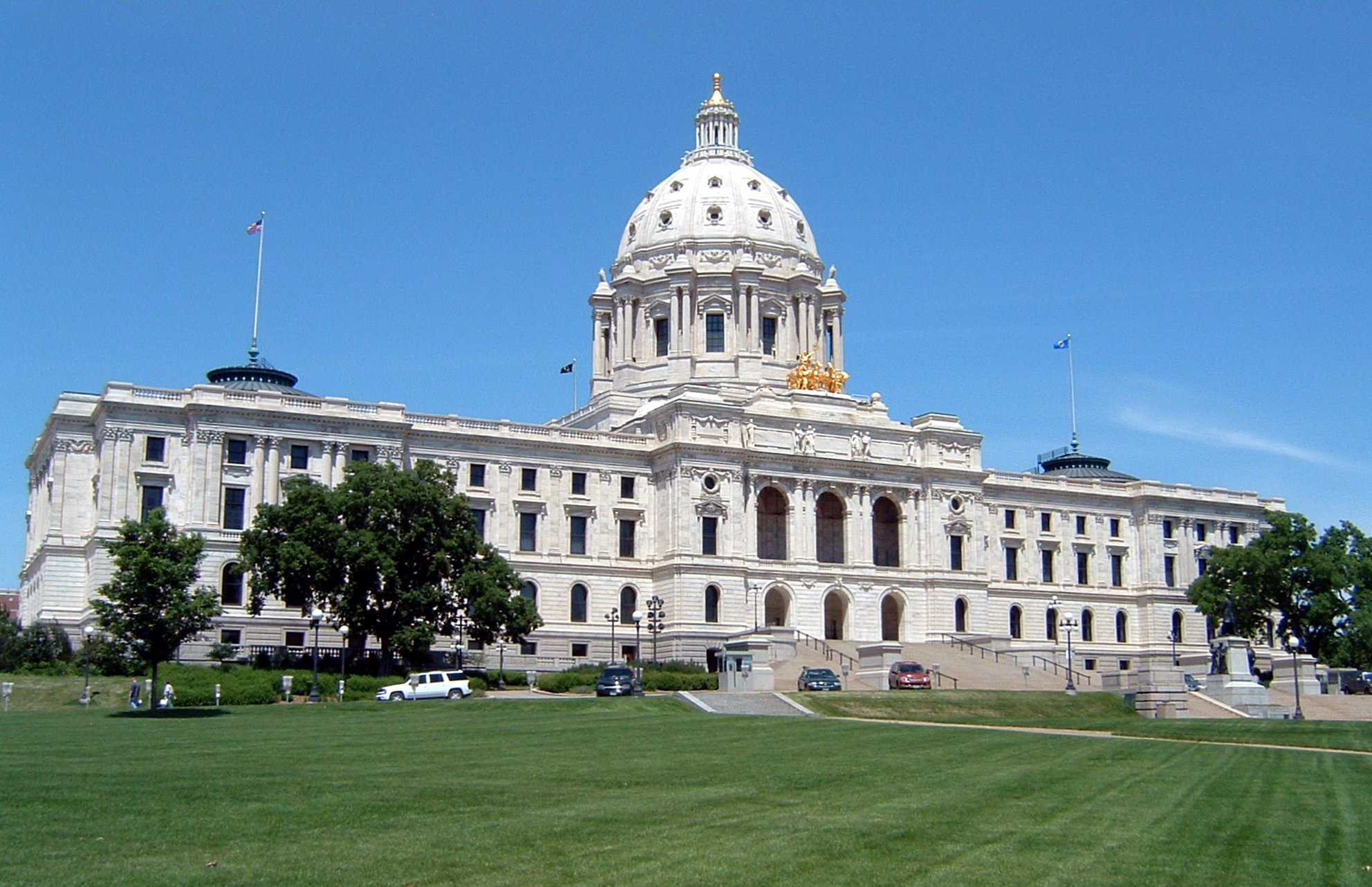

Overview
- Legislative body: Minnesota Legislature
- Jurisdiction: Minnesota, United States
- Meeting place: Minnesota State Capitol
- Term: January 4, 1983 – January 8, 1985
- Website: www.leg.state.mn.us

Minnesota State Senate
- Members: 67 Senators
- President: Jerome M. Hughes
- Majority Leader: Roger Moe
- Minority Leader: James E. Ulland
- Party control: Democratic-Farmer-Labor Party

Minnesota House of Representatives
- Members: 134 Representatives
- Speaker: Harry A. Sieben
- Majority Leader: Willis Eken, Harry A. Sieben
- Minority Leader: David M. Jennings
- Party control: Democratic-Farmer-Labor Party

The seventy-third Minnesota Legislature first convened on January 4, 1983. The 67 members of the Minnesota Senate and the 134 members of the Minnesota House of Representatives were elected during the General Election of November 2, 1982.

== Sessions ==
The legislature met in a regular session from January 4, 1983 to May 23, 1983. A continuation of the regular session was held between March 6, 1984 and April 24, 1984. There were no special sessions of the seventy-third Minnesota Legislature.

== Party summary ==
Resignations and new members are discussed in the "Membership changes" section, below.

=== Senate ===
	Party (Shading indicates majority caucus)		Total	Vacant
	DFL	IR	Total	Vacant
End of previous Legislature	44	23	67	0
Begin	42	25	67	0
Latest voting share	63%	37%		
Beginning of the next Legislature	42	25	67	0

=== House of Representatives ===
	Party (Shading indicates majority caucus)		Total	Vacant
	DFL	IR	Total	Vacant
End of previous Legislature	70	64	134	0
Begin	77	57	134	0
September 12, 1983	76	57	133	1
January 11, 1984	76	58	134	0
June 4, 1984	75	58	133	1
August 1, 1984	74	58	132	2
Latest voting share	56%	44%		
Beginning of the next Legislature	65	69	134	0

== Leadership ==
=== Senate ===
President of the Senate
Jerome M. Hughes (DFL-Maplewood)

Senate Majority Leader
Roger Moe (DFL-Ada)

Senate Minority Leader
James E. Ulland (IR-Duluth)

=== House of Representatives ===
Speaker of the House
Harry A. Sieben (DFL-Hastings)

House Majority Leader
Until August 1, 1984 Willis Eken (DFL-Twin Valley)
After August 1, 1984 Harry A. Sieben (DFL-Hastings)

House Minority Leader
David M. Jennings (IR-Truman)

== Members ==
=== Senate ===
Name	District	City	Party
Adkins, Betty	22	St. Michael	DFL
Anderson, Don A.	12	Wadena	IR
Belanger, William	41	Bloomington	IR
Benson, Duane	32	Lanesboro	IR
Berg, Charlie	11	Chokio	IR
Berglin, Linda	60	Minneapolis	DFL
Bernhagen, John	21	Hutchinson	IR
Bertram, Joe	16	Paynesville	DFL
Brataas, Nancy	33	Rochester	IR
Chmielewski, Florian	14	Sturgeon Lake	DFL
Dahl, Gregory	50	Lino Lakes	DFL
Davis, Chuck	18	Princeton	DFL
DeCramer, Gary	27	Ghent	DFL
Dicklich, Ron	05	Hibbing	DFL
Diessner, Bill	56	Afton	DFL
Dieterich, Neil	63	St. Paul	DFL
Frank, Don	51	Spring Lake Park	DFL
Frederick, Mel	30	Owatonna	IR
Frederickson, Dennis	23	New Ulm	IR
Freeman, Michael O.	40	Richfield	DFL
Hughes, Jerome M.	54	Maplewood	DFL
Isackson, Doran L.	28	Storden	IR
Johnson, Dean	15	Willmar	IR
Johnson, Doug	06	Tower	DFL
Jude, Tad	48	Maple Grove	DFL
Kamrath, Randy P.	20	Canby	IR
Knaak, Fritz	53	White Bear Lake	IR
Knutson, Howard A.	38	Burnsville	IR
Kroening, Carl	57	Minneapolis	DFL
Kronebusch, Patricia Louise	34	Rollingstone	IR
Laidig, Gary	55	Stillwater	IR
Langseth, Keith	09	Glyndon	DFL
Lantry, Marilyn	67	St. Paul	DFL
Lessard, Bob	03	International Falls	DFL
Luther, Bill	47	Brooklyn Park	DFL
McQuaid, Phyllis W.	44	Saint Louis Park	IR
Mehrkens, Lyle	26	Red Wing	IR
Merriam, Gene	49	Coon Rapids	DFL
Moe, Donald	65	St. Paul	DFL
Moe, Roger	02	Ada	DFL
Nelson, Tom A.	31	Austin	DFL
Novak, Steve	52	New Brighton	DFL
Olson, Gen	43	Minnetrista	IR
Pehler, Jim	17	St. Cloud	DFL
Peterson, Collin Clark	10	Detroit Lakes	DFL
Peterson, Darrel L.	29	Fairmont	IR
Peterson, Donna C.	61	Minneapolis	DFL
Peterson, Randolph W.	19	Wyoming	DFL
Petty, Eric D.	62	Minneapolis	DFL
Pogemiller, Larry	58	Minneapolis	DFL
Purfeerst, Clarence	25	Faribault	DFL
Ramstad, Jim	45	Plymouth	IR
Reichgott Junge, Ember	46	New Hope	DFL
Renneke, Earl	35	Le Sueur	IR
Samuelson, Don	13	Brainerd	DFL
Schmitz, Robert J.	36	Jordan	DFL
Sieloff, Ron	64	St. Paul	IR
Solon, Sam	07	Duluth	DFL
Spear, Allan	59	Minneapolis	DFL
Storm, Don	42	Edina	IR
Stumpf, LeRoy	01	Thief River Falls	DFL
Taylor, Glen	24	Mankato	IR
Ulland, James E.	08	Duluth	IR
Vega, Conrad	39	South St. Paul	DFL
Waldorf, Gene	66	St. Paul	DFL
Wegscheid, Darril	37	Apple Valley	DFL
Willet, Gerald	04	Park Rapids	DFL

=== House of Representatives ===
Name	District	City	Party
Anderson, Bob	10B	Ottertail	IR
Anderson, Bruce W.	28A	Slayton	DFL
Anderson, Glen H.	20A	Bellingham	DFL
Battaglia, David Peter	06A	Two Harbors	DFL
Beard, Pat	56B	Cottage Grove	DFL
Begich, Joseph	06B	Eveleth	DFL
Bennett, Tony	53A	Shoreview	IR
Berkelman, Thomas R.	08B	Duluth	DFL
Bishop, Dave	33B	Rochester	IR
Blatz, Kathleen	41B	Bloomington	IR
Boo, Ben	08B	Duluth	IR
Bergstrom, Don	18B	Big Lake	DFL
Brandl, John	62B	Minneapolis	DFL
Brinkman, Bernard J.	16B	Richmond	DFL
Burger, John	43A	Long Lake	IR
Carlson, Doug	14B	Sandstone	IR
Carlson, Lyndon	46B	Crystal	DFL
Clark, Janet H.	60B	Minneapolis	DFL
Clark, Karen	60A	Minneapolis	DFL
Clawson, John T.	19B	Lindstrom	DFL
Cohen, Richard	64B	St. Paul	DFL
Coleman, Sharon L.	51A	Spring Lake Park	DFL
Dempsey, Terry	23A	New Ulm	IR
Den Ouden, Gaylin	21B	Prinsburg	IR
Dimler, Chuck	36A	Chanhassen	IR
Eken, Willis	02B	Twin Valley	DFL
Elioff, Dominic J.	05A	Virginia	DFL
Ellingson, Robert L.	47B	Brooklyn Center	DFL
Erickson, Wendell O.	27B	Hills	IR
Evans, James	10A	Detroit Lakes	IR
Findlay, Gary	11A	Herman	IR
Fjoslien, David O.	11B	Brandon	IR
Forsythe, Mary	42B	Edina	IR
Frerichs, Don	32A	Rochester	IR
Graba, Jerome Clifford	12A	Sebeka	DFL
Greenfield, Lee	61A	Minneapolis	DFL
Gruenes, Dave	17B	St. Cloud	IR
Gustafson, Ben E.	07B	Duluth	DFL
Gutknecht, Gil	33A	Rochester	IR
Halberg, Chuck	38A	Burnsville	IR
Haukoos, Bob	31A	Albert Lea	IR
Heap, Jim	45B	Golden Valley	IR
Heinitz, Orlando Jacob	48A	Plymouth	IR
Himle, John	41A	Bloomington	IR
Hoberg, Dwaine	09A	Moorhead	IR
Hoffman, Chuck	55B	Stillwater	DFL
Hokr, Dorothy	46A	New Hope	IR
Jacobs, Joel	49B	Coon Rapids	DFL
Jennings, David M.	29A	Truman	IR
Jensen, Robert C.	36B	Farmington	DFL
Johnson, Virgil	34A	Caledonia	IR
Kahn, Phyllis	58B	Minneapolis	DFL
Kalis, Henry	29B	Walters	DFL
Kelly, Randy	67A	St. Paul	DFL
Knickerbocker, Jerry	43B	Minnetonka	IR
Knuth, Daniel	52B	New Brighton	DFL
Kostohryz, Dick	54B	North St. Paul	DFL
Krueger, Rick	12B	Staples	DFL
Kvam, Adolph Leonard	21A	Litchfield	IR
Larsen, Ernest A.	50A	Anoka	DFL
Levi, Connie	55A	Dellwood	IR
Long, Dee	59A	Minneapolis	DFL
Ludeman, Cal	27A	Tracy	IR
Mann, George	28B	Windom	DFL
Marsh, Marcus M.	17A	Sauk Rapids	IR
McDonald, K. J.	35B	Watertown	IR
McEachern, Bob	22A	St. Michael	DFL
McKasy, Bert	39A	Mendota Heights	IR
Metzen, James P.	39B	South St. Paul	DFL
Minne, Lona	05B	Hibbing	DFL
Munger, Willard	07A	Duluth	DFL
Murphy, Mary	08A	Hermantown	DFL
Nelson, Darby	49A	Champlin	DFL
Nelson, Ken	62A	Minneapolis	DFL
Neuenschwander, Bob	03A	International Falls	DFL
Norton, Fred C.	65A	St. Paul	DFL
O'Connor, Rich	66B	St. Paul	DFL
Ogren, Paul Anders	14A	Aitkin	DFL
Olsen, Sally	44A	Saint Louis Park	IR
Omann, Ben	16A	St. Joseph	IR
Onnen, Tony	22B	Cokato	IR
Osthoff, Tom	66A	St. Paul	DFL
Otis, Todd	59B	Minneapolis	DFL
Pauly, Sidney	42A	Eden Prairie	IR
Peterson, J.P.	18A	Princeton	DFL
Piepho, Mark J.	24A	Mankato	IR
Piper, Pat	31B	Austin	DFL
Price, Leonard	56A	Woodbury	DFL
Quinn, Joe	50B	Blaine	DFL
Quist, Allen	23B	St. Peter	IR
Redalen, Elton	32B	Fountain	IR
Reif, Robert W.	53B	White Bear Lake	IR
Rice, Jim	57A	Minneapolis	DFL
Riveness, Phil	40B	Bloomington	DFL
Rodosovich, Peter	25B	Faribault	DFL
Rodriguez, Carolyn Jane	37A	Apple Valley	DFL
Rodriguez, Frank J.	65B	St. Paul	DFL
Rose, John	63A	Roseville	IR
Sarna, John	58A	Minneapolis	DFL
Schafer, Gary	35A	Gibbon	IR
Scheid, Linda	47A	Brooklyn Park	DFL
Schoenfeld, Jerry E.	30B	Waseca	DFL
Schreiber, Bill	48B	Brooklyn Park	IR
Seaberg, Art	38B	Mendota Heights	IR
Segal, Gloria	44B	St. Louis Park	DFL
Shaver, Craig H.	45A	Wayzata	IR
Shea, Tom J.	30A	Owatonna	DFL
Sherman, Tim	34B	Winona	IR
Sieben, Harry A.	37B	Hastings	DFL
Simoneau, Wayne	51B	Fridley	DFL
Skoglund, Wes	61B	Minneapolis	DFL
Solberg, Loren	03B	Bovey	DFL
Sparby, Wally	01B	Thief River Falls	DFL
St. Onge, Doug J.	04A	Bemidji	DFL
Stadum, Tony	02A	Ada	IR
Staten, Sr., Randolph Wilbert	57B	Minneapolis	DFL
Sviggum, Steve	26A	Kenyon	IR
Swanson, James C.	40A	Richfield	DFL
Thiede, Paul M.	13A	Pequot Lakes	IR
Tomlinson, John D.	67B	St. Paul	DFL
Tunheim, Jim	01A	Kennedy	DFL
Uphus, Sylvester	15A	Sauk Centre	IR
Valan, Merlyn Orville	09B	Moorhead	IR
Valento, Don	54A	Little Canada	IR
Vanasek, Robert	25A	New Prague	DFL
Vellenga, Kathleen	64A	St. Paul	DFL
Voss, Gordon	52A	Blaine	DFL
Waltman, Bobby Joe	26B	Elgin	IR
Welch, Richard J.	19A	Cambridge	DFL
Welker, Ray	20B	Montevideo	IR
Welle, Alan	15B	Willmar	DFL
Wenzel, Steve	13B	Little Falls	DFL
Wigley, Richard E.	24B	Lake Crystal	IR
Wynia, Ann	63B	St. Paul	DFL
Zaffke, Maurice J.	04B	Backus	IR

== Membership changes ==
=== House of Representatives ===
District	Vacated by	Reason for change	Successor	Date successor seated
08B	Thomas R. Berkelman (DFL)	Resigned on September 12, 1983 to become a lobbyist for AT&T.	Ben Boo (IR)	January 11, 1984
28B	George Mann (DFL)	Died on June 4, 1984, after having been comatose since having a heart attack on April 29, 1984.	Remained vacant	
02B	Willis Eken (DFL)	Resigned on August 1, 1984 to become President of the Minnesota Farmers Union.	Remained vacant	

Preceded by Seventy-second Minnesota Legislature	Seventy-third Minnesota Legislature; 1983—1984	Succeeded by Seventy-fourth Minnesota Legislature
