= 74th Minnesota Legislature =

1985 and 1986 legislative sessions

Seventy-fourth Minnesota Legislature
←	73rd Minnesota Legislature	75th Minnesota Legislature	→
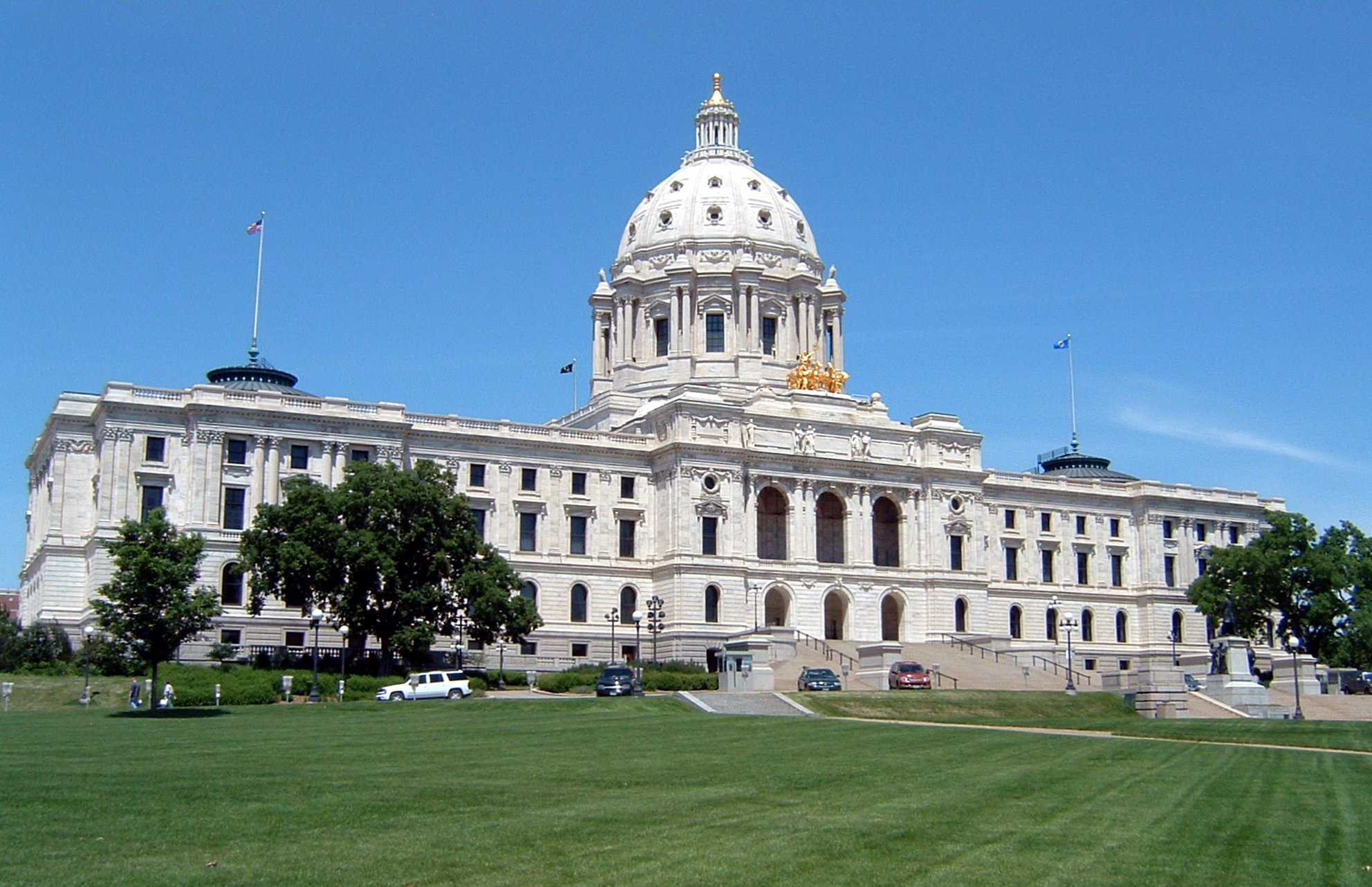

Overview
- Legislative body: Minnesota Legislature
- Jurisdiction: Minnesota, United States
- Meeting place: Minnesota State Capitol
- Term: January 8, 1985 – January 6, 1987
- Website: www.leg.state.mn.us

Minnesota State Senate
- Members: 67 Senators
- President: Jerome M. Hughes
- Majority Leader: Roger Moe
- Minority Leader: James E. Ulland, Glen Taylor
- Party control: Democratic-Farmer-Labor Party

Minnesota House of Representatives
- Members: 134 Representatives
- Speaker: David M. Jennings
- Majority Leader: Connie Levi
- Minority Leader: Fred C. Norton
- Party control: Independent-Republican Party

The seventy-fourth Minnesota Legislature first convened on January 8, 1985. The 67 members of the Minnesota Senate were elected during the General Election of November 2, 1982, and the 134 members of the Minnesota House of Representatives were elected during the General Election of November 6, 1984.

== Sessions ==
The legislature met in a regular session from January 8, 1985, to May 20, 1985. A special session was convened from June 19, 1985, to June 21, 1985, to consider legislation regarding taxes, appropriations and the state budget, education, the operation of state and local governments, and major bills not passed during the regular session.

A continuation of the regular session was held between February 3, 1986, and March 21, 1986. A special session was convened on April 2, 1986, to complete action on the state budget, and bills relating to state revenue and farm loan guarantees.

== Party summary ==
Resignations and new members are discussed in the "Membership changes" section, below.

=== Senate ===
	Party (Shading indicates majority caucus)			Total	Vacant
	DFL	Ind	IR	Total	Vacant
End of previous Legislature	42	0	25	67	0
Begin	42	0	25	67	0
January 9, 1985	42	0	24	66	1
February 11, 1985	42	0	25	67	0
March 7, 1985	42	1 (Note: Previously an Independent-Republican, Charlie Berg became an Independent on March 7, 1985, and joined the DFL in May 1986.)	24	67	0
May 1986	43	0	24	67	0
Latest voting share	64%	0%	36%		
Beginning of the next Legislature	47	0	20	67	0

=== House of Representatives ===
	Party (Shading indicates majority caucus)		Total	Vacant
	DFL	IR	Total	Vacant
End of previous Legislature	74	58	132	2
Begin	65	69	134	0
November 19, 1986	65	68	133	1
December 5, 1986	65	67	132	2
Latest voting share	49%	50%		
Beginning of the next Legislature	83	51	134	0

== Leadership ==
=== Senate ===
President of the Senate
Jerome M. Hughes (DFL-Maplewood)

Senate Majority Leader
Roger Moe (DFL-Erskine)

Senate Minority Leader
Until January 9, 1985 James E. Ulland (IR-Duluth)
After January 9, 1985 Glen Taylor (IR-Mankato)

=== House of Representatives ===
Speaker of the House
David M. Jennings (IR-Truman)

House Majority Leader
Connie Levi (IR-Dellwood)

House Minority Leader
Fred C. Norton (DFL-St. Paul)

== Members ==
=== Senate ===
Name	District	City	Party
Adkins, Betty	22	St. Michael	DFL
Anderson, Don A.	12	Wadena	IR
Belanger, William	41	Bloomington	IR
Benson, Duane	32	Lanesboro	IR
Berg, Charlie	11	Chokio	DFL
Berglin, Linda	60	Minneapolis	DFL
Bernhagen, John	21	Hutchinson	IR
Bertram, Joe	16	Paynesville	DFL
Brataas, Nancy	33	Rochester	IR
Chmielewski, Florian	14	Sturgeon Lake	DFL
Dahl, Gregory	50	Coon Rapids	DFL
Davis, Chuck	18	Princeton	DFL
DeCramer, Gary	27	Ghent	DFL
Dicklich, Ron	05	Hibbing	DFL
Diessner, Bill	56	Afton	DFL
Dieterich, Neil	63	St. Paul	DFL
Frank, Don	51	Spring Lake Park	DFL
Frederick, Mel	30	Owatonna	IR
Frederickson, Dennis	23	New Ulm	IR
Freeman, Michael O.	40	Richfield	DFL
Gustafson, Jim	08	Duluth	IR
Hughes, Jerome M.	54	Maplewood	DFL
Isackson, Doran L.	28	Storden	IR
Johnson, Dean	15	Willmar	IR
Johnson, Doug	06	Tower	DFL
Jude, Tad	48	Maple Grove	DFL
Kamrath, Randy P.	20	Canby	IR
Knaak, Fritz	53	White Bear Lake	IR
Knutson, Howard A.	38	Burnsville	IR
Kroening, Carl	57	Minneapolis	DFL
Kronebusch, Patricia Louise	34	Rollingstone	IR
Laidig, Gary	55	Stillwater	IR
Langseth, Keith	09	Glyndon	DFL
Lantry, Marilyn	67	St. Paul	DFL
Lessard, Bob	03	International Falls	DFL
Luther, Bill	47	Brooklyn Park	DFL
McQuaid, Phyllis W.	44	Saint Louis Park	IR
Mehrkens, Lyle	26	Red Wing	IR
Merriam, Gene	49	Coon Rapids	DFL
Moe, Donald	65	St. Paul	DFL
Moe, Roger	02	Erskine	DFL
Nelson, Tom A.	31	Austin	DFL
Novak, Steve	52	New Brighton	DFL
Olson, Gen	43	Minnetrista	IR
Pehler, Jim	17	St. Cloud	DFL
Peterson, Collin Clark	10	Detroit Lakes	DFL
Peterson, Darrel L.	29	Fairmont	IR
Peterson, Donna C.	61	Minneapolis	DFL
Peterson, Randolph W.	19	Wyoming	DFL
Petty, Eric D.	62	Minneapolis	DFL
Pogemiller, Larry	58	Minneapolis	DFL
Purfeerst, Clarence	25	Faribault	DFL
Ramstad, Jim	45	Wayzata	IR
Reichgott Junge, Ember	46	New Hope	DFL
Renneke, Earl	35	Le Sueur	IR
Samuelson, Don	13	Brainerd	DFL
Schmitz, Robert J.	36	Jordan	DFL
Sieloff, Ron	64	St. Paul	IR
Solon, Sam	07	Duluth	DFL
Spear, Allan	59	Minneapolis	DFL
Storm, Don	42	Edina	IR
Stumpf, LeRoy	01	Thief River Falls	DFL
Taylor, Glen	24	Mankato	IR
Ulland, James E.	08	Duluth	IR
Vega, Conrad	39	South St. Paul	DFL
Waldorf, Gene	66	St. Paul	DFL
Wegscheid, Darril	37	Apple Valley	DFL
Willet, Gerald	04	Park Rapids	DFL

=== House of Representatives ===
Name	District	City	Party
Anderson, Bob	10B	Ottertail	IR
Anderson, Glen H.	20A	Bellingham	DFL
Backlund, Gordon	51A	Fridley	IR
Battaglia, David Peter	06A	Two Harbors	DFL
Beard, Pat	56B	Cottage Grove	DFL
Becklin, Lynn H.	19A	Cambridge	IR
Begich, Joseph	06B	Eveleth	DFL
Bennett, Tony	53A	Shoreview	IR
Bishop, Dave	33B	Rochester	IR
Blatz, Kathleen	41B	Bloomington	IR
Boerboom, Jim	27A	Cottonwood	IR
Boo, Ben	08B	Duluth	IR
Brandl, John	62B	Minneapolis	DFL
Brinkman, Bernard J.	16B	Richmond	DFL
Brown, Chuck	11A	Appleton	DFL
Burger, John	43A	Long Lake	IR
Carlson, Doug	14B	Sandstone	IR
Carlson, Joel D.	09A	Moorhead	IR
Carlson, Lyndon	46B	Crystal	DFL
Clark, Karen	60A	Minneapolis	DFL
Clausnitzer, Dale	48A	Maple Grove	IR
Cohen, Richard	64B	St. Paul	DFL
Dempsey, Terry	23A	New Ulm	IR
Den Ouden, Gaylin	21B	Prinsburg	IR
Dimler, Chuck	36A	Chanhassen	IR
Dyke, Carol	28A	Worthington	IR
Elioff, Dominic J.	05A	Virginia	DFL
Ellingson, Robert L.	47B	Brooklyn Center	DFL
Erickson, Wendell O.	27B	Hills	IR
Fjoslien, David O.	11B	Brandon	IR
Forsythe, Mary	42B	Edina	IR
Frederick, Sal	24B	Mankato	IR
Frederickson, Dennis C.	28B	Windom	IR
Frerichs, Don	32A	Rochester	IR
Greenfield, Lee	61A	Minneapolis	DFL
Gruenes, Dave	17B	St. Cloud	IR
Gutknecht, Gil	33A	Rochester	IR
Halberg, Chuck	38A	Burnsville	IR
Hartinger, John M.	50A	Coon Rapids	IR
Hartle, Dean	30A	Owatonna	IR
Haukoos, Bob	31A	Albert Lea	IR
Heap, Jim	45B	Plymouth	IR
Himle, John	41A	Bloomington	IR
Jacobs, Joel	49B	Coon Rapids	DFL
Jaros, Mike	07B	Duluth	DFL
Jennings, David M.	29A	Truman	IR
Jennings, Loren Geo	19B	Harris	DFL
Johnson, Virgil	34A	Caledonia	IR
Kahn, Phyllis	58B	Minneapolis	DFL
Kalis, Henry	29B	Walters	DFL
Kelly, Randy	67A	St. Paul	DFL
Kiffmeyer, Ralph R.	18B	Big Lake	IR
Knickerbocker, Jerry	43B	Minnetonka	IR
Knuth, Daniel	52B	New Brighton	DFL
Kostohryz, Dick	54B	North St. Paul	DFL
Krueger, Rick	12B	Staples	DFL
Kvam, Adolph Leonard	21A	Litchfield	IR
Levi, Connie	55A	Dellwood	IR
Lieder, Bernard	02A	Crookston	DFL
Long, Dee	59A	Minneapolis	DFL
Marsh, Marcus M.	17A	Sauk Rapids	IR
McDonald, K. J.	35B	Watertown	IR
McEachern, Robert O.	22A	St. Michael	DFL
McKasy, Bert	39A	Mendota Heights	IR
McLaughlin, Peter	60B	Minneapolis	DFL
McPherson, Harriet	55B	Stillwater	IR
Metzen, James P.	39B	South St. Paul	DFL
Miller, Howard G.	20B	Redwood Falls	IR
Minne, Lona	05B	Hibbing	DFL
Munger, Willard	07A	Duluth	DFL
Murphy, Mary	08A	Hermantown	DFL
Nelson, Darby	49A	Champlin	DFL
Nelson, Ken	62A	Minneapolis	DFL
Neuenschwander, Bob	03A	International Falls	DFL
Norton, Fred C.	65A	St. Paul	DFL
O'Connor, Rich	66B	St. Paul	DFL
Ogren, Paul Anders	14A	Aitkin	DFL
Olsen, Sally	44A	Saint Louis Park	IR
Olson, Edgar	02B	Fosston	DFL
Omann, Ben	16A	St. Joseph	IR
Onnen, Tony	22B	Cokato	IR
Osthoff, Tom	66A	St. Paul	DFL
Otis, Todd	59B	Minneapolis	DFL
Ozment, Dennis	37B	Rosemount	IR
Pappas, Sandy	65B	St. Paul	DFL
Pauly, Sidney	42A	Eden Prairie	IR
Peterson, J.P.	18A	Princeton	DFL
Piepho, Mark J.	24A	Mankato	IR
Piper, Pat	31B	Austin	DFL
Poppenhagen, Dennis	10A	Detroit Lakes	IR
Price, Leonard	56A	Woodbury	DFL
Quinn, Joe	50B	Coon Rapids	DFL
Quist, Allen	23B	St. Peter	IR
Redalen, Elton	32B	Fountain	IR
Rees, Tom	36B	Lakeville	IR
Rest, Ann	46A	New Hope	DFL
Rice, Jim	57A	Minneapolis	DFL
Richter, Don	12A	Wadena	IR
Riveness, Phil	40B	Bloomington	DFL
Rodosovich, Peter	25B	Faribault	DFL
Rose, John	63A	Roseville	IR
Sarna, John	58A	Minneapolis	DFL
Schafer, Gary	35A	Gibbon	IR
Scheid, Linda	47A	Brooklyn Park	DFL
Schoenfeld, Jerry E.	30B	Waseca	DFL
Schreiber, Bill	48B	Brooklyn Park	IR
Seaberg, Art	38B	Mendota Heights	IR
Segal, Gloria	44B	St. Louis Park	DFL
Shaver, Craig H.	45A	Wayzata	IR
Sherman, Tim	34B	Winona	IR
Simoneau, Wayne	51B	Fridley	DFL
Skoglund, Wes	61B	Minneapolis	DFL
Solberg, Loren	03B	Bovey	DFL
Sparby, Wally	01B	Thief River Falls	DFL
Stanius, Brad	53B	White Bear Lake	IR
Staten, Randy	57B	Minneapolis	DFL
Sviggum, Steve	26A	Kenyon	IR
Thiede, Paul M.	13A	Pequot Lakes	IR
Thorson, Theodore W.	04A	Bemidji	IR
Tjornhom, Chris	40A	Richfield	IR
Tomlinson, John D.	67B	St. Paul	DFL
Tompkins, Eileen	37A	Apple Valley	IR
Tunheim, Jim	01A	Kennedy	DFL
Uphus, Sylvester	15A	Sauk Centre	IR
Valan, Merlyn Orville	09B	Moorhead	IR
Valento, Don	54A	Little Canada	IR
Vanasek, Robert	25A	New Prague	DFL
Vellenga, Kathleen	64A	St. Paul	DFL
Voss, Gordon	52A	Blaine	DFL
Waltman, Bobby Joe	26B	Elgin	IR
Welle, Alan	15B	Willmar	DFL
Wenzel, Steve	13B	Little Falls	DFL
Wynia, Ann	63B	St. Paul	DFL
Zaffke, Maurice J.	04B	Backus	IR

== Membership changes ==
=== Senate ===
District	Vacated by	Reason for change	Successor	Date successor seated
08	James E. Ulland (IR)	Resigned January 9, 1985, to become the Senior Vice President for First Bank System.	Jim Gustafson (IR)	February 11, 1985

=== House of Representatives ===
District	Vacated by	Reason for change	Successor	Date successor seated
16A	Ben Omann (IR)	Died November 19, 1986, of cancer at a hospital in St. Cloud, Minnesota.	Remained vacant	
28A	Carol Dyke (IR)	Resigned December 5, 1986, to move to Sioux Falls, South Dakota, following the defeat of her re-election bid in the General Election of 1986.	Remained vacant	

== Notes ==
Preceded by Seventy-third Minnesota Legislature	Seventy-fourth Minnesota Legislature; 1985—1986	Succeeded by Seventy-fifth Minnesota Legislature
