= 69th Minnesota Legislature =

1975 to 1976 legislative session

Sixty-ninth Minnesota Legislature
←	68th Minnesota Legislature	70th Minnesota Legislature	→
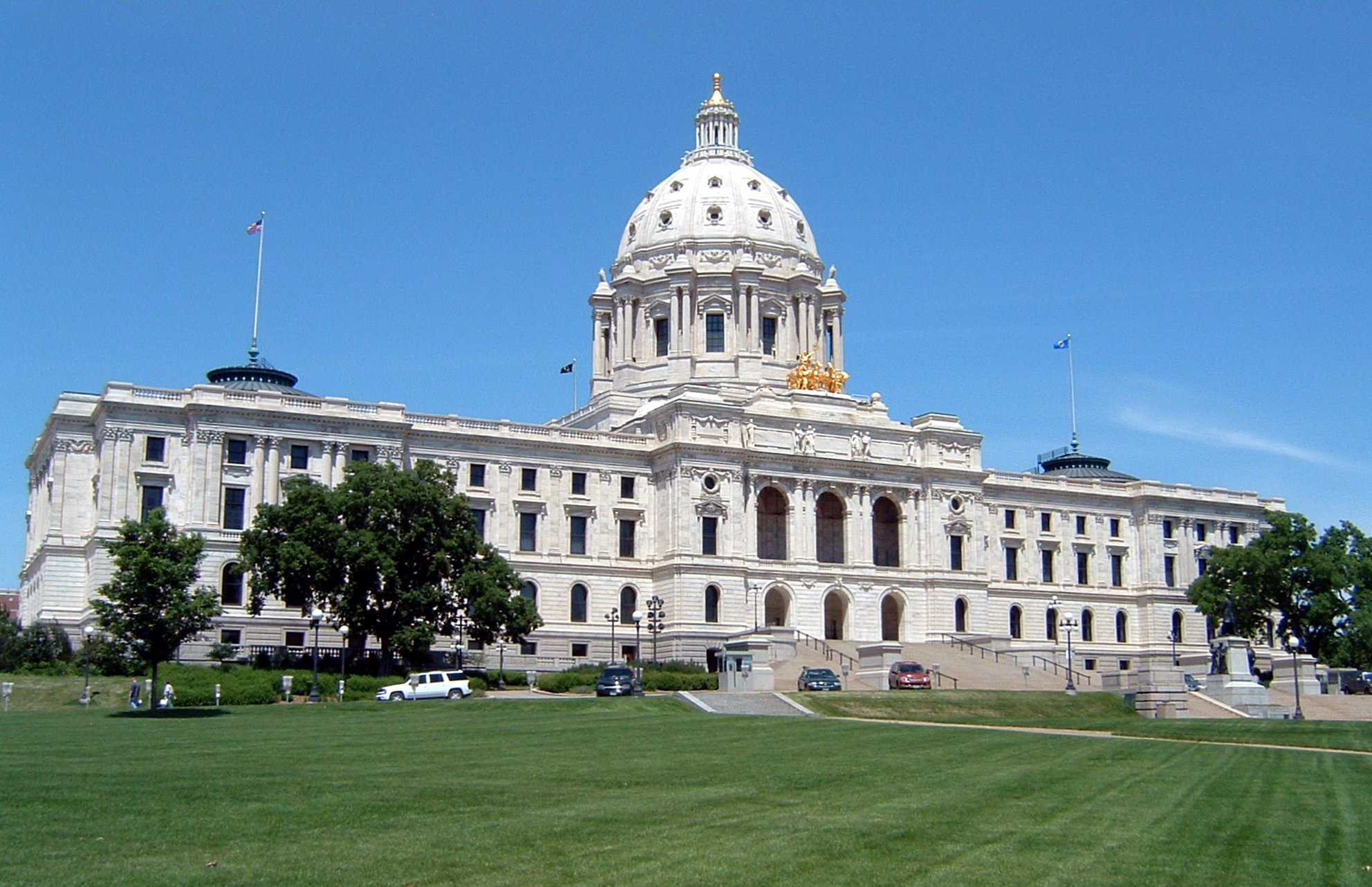

Overview
- Legislative body: Minnesota Legislature
- Jurisdiction: Minnesota, United States
- Meeting place: Minnesota State Capitol
- Term: January 7, 1975 – January 3, 1977
- Website: www.leg.state.mn.us

Minnesota State Senate
- Members: 67 Senators
- President: Alec G. Olson
- Majority Leader: Nicholas D. Coleman
- Minority Leader: Robert O. Ashbach
- Party control: Democratic-Farmer-Labor Party

Minnesota House of Representatives
- Members: 134 Representatives
- Speaker: Martin O. Sabo
- Majority Leader: Irvin N. Anderson
- Minority Leader: Henry J. Savelkoul
- Party control: Democratic-Farmer-Labor Party

The sixty-ninth Minnesota Legislature first convened on January 7, 1975. The 67 members of the Minnesota Senate were elected during the General Election of November 7, 1972, while the 134 members of the Minnesota House of Representatives were elected during the General Election of November 5, 1974. The sixty-ninth Legislature was the first Minnesota Legislature to sit after the repeal of the requirement that Minnesota legislators be chosen in legally nonpartisan elections.

== Sessions ==
The legislature met in a regular session from January 7, 1975 to May 19, 1975. A continuation of the regular session was held between January 27, 1976 and April 7, 1976. There were no special sessions of the 69th Legislature.

== Party summary ==
Resignations and new members are discussed in the "Membership changes" section, below.

=== Senate ===
	Party (Shading indicates majority caucus)			Total	Vacant
	DFL	Ind.	R	Total	Vacant
End of previous Legislature	38	1	27	66	1
Begin	38	1	27	66	1
February 10, 1975	38	1	28	67	0
December 29, 1976	37	1	28	66	1
Latest voting share	56%	2%	42%		
Beginning of the next Legislature	48	0	18	66	1

=== House of Representatives ===
	Party (Shading indicates majority caucus)		Total	Vacant
	DFL	R	Total	Vacant
End of previous Legislature	78	56	134	0
Begin	104	30	134	0
January 27, 1976	103	31	134	0
Latest voting share	77%	23%		
Beginning of the next Legislature	104	30	134	0

== Leadership ==
=== Senate ===
President of the Senate
Alec G. Olson (DFL-Spicer)

Senate Majority Leader
Nicholas D. Coleman (DFL-Saint Paul)

Senate Minority Leader
Robert O. Ashbach (R-Saint Paul)

=== House of Representatives ===
Speaker of the House
Martin O. Sabo (DFL-Minneapolis)

House Majority Leader
Irvin N. Anderson (DFL-International Falls)

House Minority Leader
Henry J. Savelkoul (R-Albert Lea)

== Membership changes ==
=== Senate ===
District	Vacated by	Reason for change	Successor	Date successor seated
33	None	Incumbent Conservative/Republican Harold G. Krieger was elected to the office of district court judge of Olmsted County in the General Election of 1974, and was hence forced to resign from the Senate. The exact date of Krieger's resignation is unknown, but was prior to the convention of the 69th Legislature, and hence this seat was already vacant when the 69th Legislature convened.	Nancy Brataas (IR)	February 10, 1975
21	Alec G. Olson (DFL)	Incumbent DFLer and then-Senate President Alec G. Olson had been reelected during the General Election of 1976. However, during the same election cycle, U.S. Senator Walter Mondale was elected Vice President of the United States, causing Mondale to resign from the U.S. Senate. Governor Wendell Anderson proceeded to appoint himself to Mondale's vacated seat, which caused Lieutenant Governor Rudy Perpich to succeed to the office of Governor, and hence created a vacancy in the office of Lieutenant Governor. As per the provisions of the Minnesota Constitution, Olson, as the last-elected President of the Senate, then succeeded to the office of Lieutenant Governor, causing him to automatically resign his seat in the Minnesota Senate effective December 29, 1976. Thus, this seat was still vacant when the 70th Legislature convened.	Remained vacant	
