= Clarence L. Gunter =

American businessman, educator, and politician

Clarence L. Gunter (June 22, 1908 – February 23, 1990) was an American businessman, educator, and politician.

Gunter was born in Clara City, Chippewa County, Minnesota. He went to St. Mary's Boarding High School in Bird Island, Minnesota, and then received his bachelor's degree from St. Cloud State University in 1971. He taught school and was a grain, fertilizer, seed and feed owner and the operator of the Gunter Elevator Company. Gunter lived in Raymond, Kandiyohi County, Minnesota, with his wife and family. Gunter served on the Raymond, Minnesota School Board and was a Democrat. He served in the Minnesota House of Representatives in 1977 and 1978. Gunter died from cancer at his home in Raymond, Minnesota.
