= David J. Beauchamp =

American politician

David J. Beauchamp (born September 9, 1940) was an American politician.

Beauchamp was born in Langdon, Cavalier County, North Dakota. He received his bachelor's degree in biology from College of Saint Benedict and Saint John's University, in Collegeville, Minnesota, in 1962 and his master's degree in counseling from the University of North Dakota. Beauchamp served in the United States Peace Corps in Thailand from 1963 to 1965. Beauchamp lived in Moorhead, Minnesota with his wife and family and was a financial aid officer. Beauchamp served in the Minnesota House of Representatives from 1975 to 1978 and was a Democrat.
