= Al W. Patton =

American politician

Al Patton

Member of the Minnesota House of Representatives from the 17A district
- In office January 1, 1973 – January 4, 1981
- Preceded by: Aubrey W. Dirlam
- Succeeded by: Marcus M. Marsh

Personal details
- Born: Alvin William Patton; September 18, 1937 (age 89) Sauk Rapids, Minnesota, U.S.
- Party: Democratic (DFL)
- Spouse: Joan
- Children: 3
- Education: Northwest Technical Institute
- Occupation: teacher

Military service
- Allegiance: United States
- Branch/service: United States Army
- Rank: Communications Sergeant

Alvin W. Patton (born September 18, 1937) is an American politician in the state of Minnesota. He served in the Minnesota House of Representatives.
