= Bruce D. Williamson =

American businessman and politician

Bruce D. Williamson (born October 19, 1947) was an American businessman and politician.

Williamson was born in Minneapolis, Minnesota. He lived in Bloomington, Minnesota and graduated from Bloomington Lincoln High School in 1964. Williamson served in the United States Army Reserve. He went to Macalester College and University of Minnesota. Williamson was a credit consultant. He served in the Minnesota House of Representatives from 1975 to 1978 and was a Democrat.
