= Orville E. Birnstihl =

American politician

- Born: December 27, 1917; Pillager, Minnesota, U.S.
- Died: May 20, 2015 (aged 97); Clermont, Florida, U.S.
- Occupations: Farmer, Businessman, Politician
- Political party: Democratic

Orville E. Birnstihl (December 27, 1917 – May 20, 2015) was an American farmer, businessman, and politician.

Birnstihl was born in Pillager, Minnesota. He served in the United States Army between 1945 and 1949. Birnstihl lived in Fremont, Nebraska and Boone, Iowa and operated the bus lines. He moved to Faribault, Minnesota, in 1970, with his wife and family. Birnstih owned a cattle ranch and farm in Faribault. He also was involved in the automobile business. Birnstihl served in the Minnesota House of Representatives from 1975 to 1978 and was a Democrat. He died in Clermont, Florida.
