= Stephen Keefe =

American politician

Senator in the Minnesota Senate for Hennepin County
- In office 1973–1980

Personal details
- Born: September 9, 1945 (age 81) Minneapolis, Minnesota, United States
- Party: Democratic
- Children: 2
- Education: University of Minnesota
- Occupation: Chemist

Stephen "Steve" Keefe (born September 9, 1945) is an American chemist and politician.

Keefe was born in Minneapolis, Minnesota and received his bachelor's degree from the University of Minnesota. He was a chemist and lived in Minneapolis, Minnesota. Keefe served in the Minnesota Senate from 1973 to 1980 and was a Democrat.
