= William D. Dean =

American politician (born 1940)

Member of the Minnesota House of Representatives

Personal details
- Born: September 1, 1940 (age 85) Mankato, Minnesota
- Party: Republican
- Education: University of the Pacific (BA); University of Minnesota (MA)
- Occupation: Politician, television and media producer

William D. Dean (born September 1, 1940) was an American politician and television and media producer.

Dean was born in Mankato, Minnesota and went to the Minneapolis, Minnesota and St. Louis Park, Minnesota Elementary Schools. He graduated from Monrovia High School in Monrovia, California. Dean served in the United States Army during the Vietnam War. Dean graduated with a bachelor's degree in speech communication from the University of the Pacific in Stockton, California and from the University of Minnesota with a master's degree in speech communication. He lived in Minneapolis, Minnesota with his wife and family. Dean served in the Minnesota House of Representatives from 1975 to 1982 and was a Republican.

== Career as legislator ==
As a member of the Minnesota House in 1982, Greenfield was one of two Republicans to sponsor the Acid Deposition Control Act, to regulate acid rain in Minnesota. The bill was also sponsored by Willard Munger and Gary W. Laidig.
