= Douglas H. Sillers =

American politician (1915–2011)

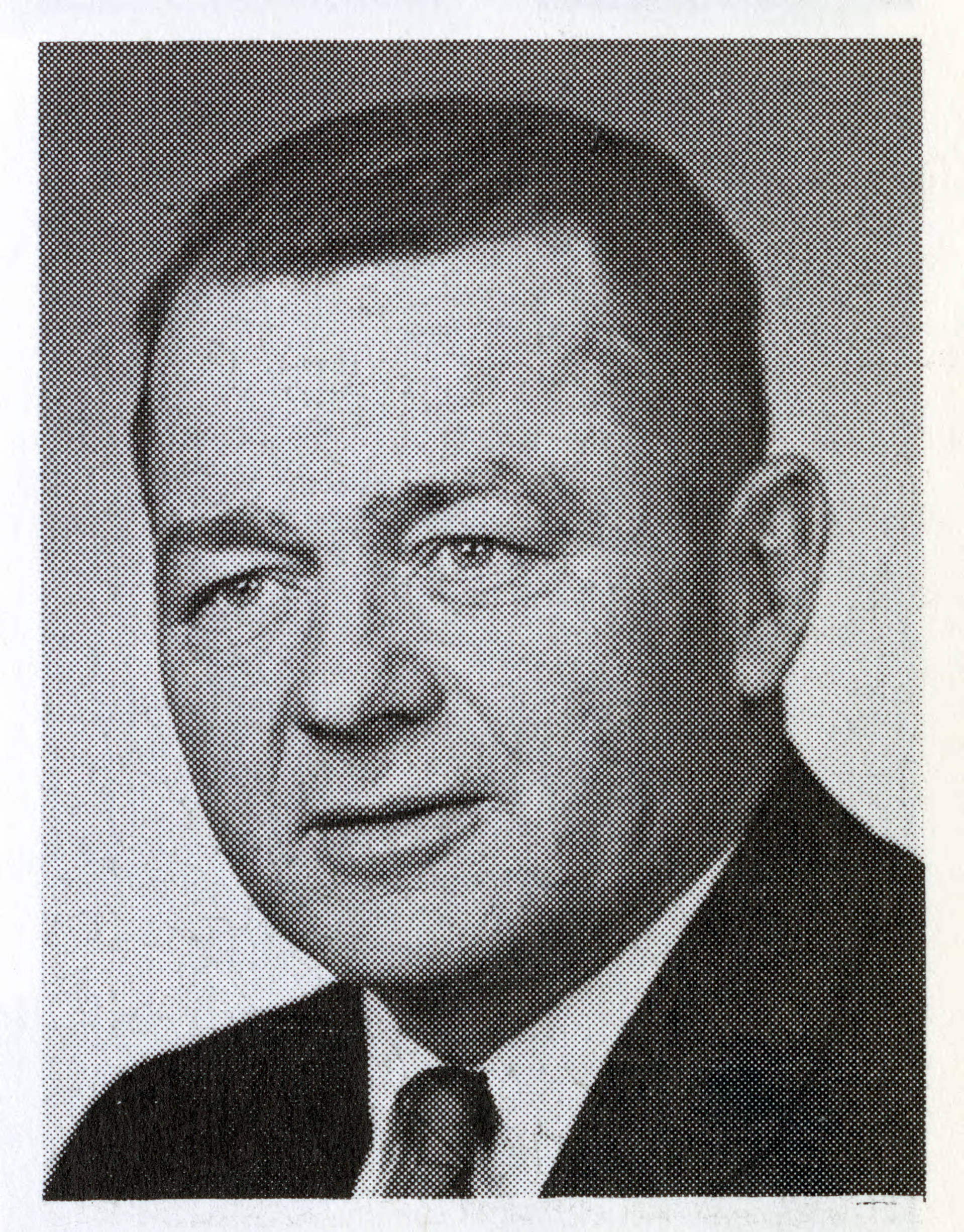
Sillers in 1963

Douglas H. Sillers (February 9, 1915 – August 1, 2011) was an Minnesotan politician who served in both the Minnesota House of Representatives and the Minnesota Senate.

Sillers was born in 1915 in Calvin, North Dakota. After completing high school in Calvin he earned a Bachelor of Arts from Concordia College in Moorhead, Minnesota. He then became a social studies teacher. He also worked at the Federal Land Bank in Washburn, North Dakota.

During World War II Sillers joined the United States Navy. He served in England and earned the rank of Lieutenant (junior grade).

Sillers ran in 1962 for the Minnesota House of Representatives for District 56. He was elected and then re-elected four times. He served District 56 followed by District 56A through 1972. He started his career in the House as an independent, but later joined the Independent-Republican party. In 1972 he was elected to the Minnesota Senate, representing the 9th district. He was re-elected to the Senate in 1976, but lost his 1980 re-election bid.

Apart from his career in politics, Sillers was a farmer, growing sugar beets and grains on his farm. He also taught political science at Concordia College in Moorhead. Sillers was a Presbyterian. He died in 2011.
