= Ray Pleasant =

American politician (1928–2022)

Member of the Minnesota House of Representatives from the 39B district
- In office 1973–1980

Personal details
- Born: April 22, 1928 Jetmore, Kansas, U.S.
- Died: May 27, 2022 (aged 94) Chaska, Minnesota, U.S.
- Party: Independent Republican
- Spouse: A. Gene Crenshaw
- Children: 2
- Education: University of Kansas
- Occupation: Politician

Ray O'Jean Pleasant (April 22, 1928 – May 27, 2022) was an American politician in the state of Minnesota.

== Early life and career ==
Pleasant was born in Jetmore, Kansas. He served in the United States Army during the Korean War as an army engineer and received his bachelor's degree in electrical engineering from the University of Kansas in 1951. Pleasant worked for Remington Rand and was sent to Minneapolis, Minnesota. He then lived in Bloomington, Minnesota with his wife and family and served on the Bloomington City Council from 1970 to 1973. Pleasant then served in the Minnesota House of Representatives from 1973 to 1980 as an Independent Republican member, representing district 39B. He was the second African-American to be elected to the Minnesota House of Representatives, and the first since the election of John Francis Wheaton in 1899.

Pleasant's wife A. Gene Crenshaw served for a time on the judicial selection board of the governor of Minnesota.
