= Lyle G. Abeln =

American politician

Lyle Abeln

Member of the Minnesota House of Representatives from the 38B district
- In office 1975–1978

Personal details
- Born: March 9, 1945 (age 81) Richmond, Minnesota, U.S.
- Party: Democratic
- Children: 2
- Education: St. Cloud State University (BA, MA)

Lyle G. Abeln (born March 9, 1945) is an American politician and educator.

== Background ==
Abeln was born in Richmond, Minnesota, and attended St. Boniface High School. Abeln received his Bachelor of Arts and Master of Arts degree from St. Cloud State University. He lived in Bloomington, Minnesota with his wife and family and taught mathematics. Abeln served in the Minnesota House of Representatives from 1975 to 1978 and was a Democrat.
