= Steven O. Lindgren =

American politician (born 1949)

Steven O. Lindgren (born June 29, 1949) was an American politician and teacher.

Lindgren was born in Richfield, Hennepin County, Minnesota and graduated from Richfield High School in 1967. He lived in Richfield, Minnesota with his wife and family. Lindgren graduated from the University of Minnesota in 1971 and was a high school teacher. Lindgren was also involved with Lindgren Associates. He served on the Richfield School Board. Lindgren also served in the Minnesota Senate in 1981 and 1982 and was a Republican.
