= William Nelson Kelly =

American politician

Member of the Minnesota House of Representatives from the 66B district
- In office 1971–1972

Member of the Minnesota House of Representatives from the 2A district
- In office 1973–1978

Personal details
- Born: December 2, 1939 East Grand Forks, Minnesota, U.S.
- Died: July 23, 2023 (aged 83)
- Party: Democratic-Farmer-Labor
- Spouse: Janet Worth
- Children: 1
- Education: University of North Dakota

William Nelson Kelly (December 2, 1939 – July 31, 2023) was an American politician. He served as a Democratic-Farmer-Labor member for the 2A and 66B districts of the Minnesota House of Representatives.

== Life and career ==
Kelly was born in East Grand Forks, Minnesota and attended the University of North Dakota. He was a teacher at East Grand Forks Senior High School and served in the Peace Corps from 1965 to 1967.

In 1971, Kelly was elected to represent the 66B district of the Minnesota House of Representatives, serving until 1972. The next year, Kelly was elected to represent the 2A district, serving until 1978.

Kelly died on July 31, 2023, at the age of 83.
