= David R. Cummiskey =

American politician

David R. "Dave" Cummiskey (born April 4, 1949) is an American politician.

Cummiskey was born in Mankato, Minnesota. He received his bachelor's degree in political science from Minnesota State University, Mankato. Cummiskey served on the Mankato City Council and was a Democrat. He served in the Minnesota House of Representatives from 1973 to 1978.
