= David D. Schaaf =

American politician (1939–2024)

David D. Schaaf (February 15, 1939 – 2024) was an American politician and businessman.

== Early life and education ==
Schaaf was born in Minneapolis, Minnesota. He graduated from Duluth East High School in Duluth, Minnesota and went to St. Cloud State University. Schaaf lived in Fridley, Minnesota and was a florist.

== Career ==
He served in the Minnesota Senate from 1973 to 1980 and was part of Minnesota's Democratic-Farmer-Labor Party. He was also an editor for the Fridley Sun newspaper.

== Death ==
Schaaf died in 2024.
