= Harold J. Dahl =

American lawyer (1930–1989)

- Born: April 27, 1930; Duluth, Minnesota, U.S.
- Died: February 20, 1989 (aged 58); Minneapolis, Minnesota, U.S.
- Education: Duluth Central High School; Northwestern University; University of Minnesota Law School
- Known for: Member of the Minnesota House of Representatives, District Court Judge for Wright County
- Office: Member of the Minnesota House of Representatives
- Political party: Democratic

Harold J. Dahl (April 27, 1930 – February 20, 1989) was an American politician and judge.

Dahl was born in Duluth, Minnesota and graduated from Duluth Central High School. He served in the United States Navy during the Korean War. Dahl went to Northwestern University and the University of Minnesota Law School. Dahl was admitted to the Minnesota bar. He lived in Howard Lake, Minnesota with his wife and family. Dahl served on the Howard Lake School Board and was a Democrat. He served in the Minnesota House of Representatives from 1973 to 1977. In 1977, he was appointed district court judge for Wright County, Minnesota. Dahl died from cancer at the Riverside Medical Hospice in Minneapolis, Minnesota.
