= Joel D. Carlson =

American politician

Joel D. Carlson (born March 22, 1960) was an American politician and businessman.

Carlson lived in Moorhead, Minnesota with his wife and family. He studied political science at University of Minnesota and was involved in the construction business. Carlson served in the Minnesota House of Representatives in 1985 and 1986 and was a Republican.
