= John R. Kaley =

American politician (1918–2005)

John Richard "Dick" Kaley (December 14, 1918 – September 18, 2005) was an American businessman and politician.

Kaley lived in Rochester, Minnesota and went to the University of Rochester in Rochester, New York. He served in the United States Army during World War II. Kaley worked for IBM and was a security coordinator. He served in the Minnesota House of Representatives from 1975 to 1982 and was a Republican.
