= Glen Sherwood =

American politician

Member of the Minnesota House of Representatives from the 4B district
- In office 1973–1982

Personal details
- Born: May 7, 1934 (age 92) Tracy, Minnesota, U.S.
- Party: Democratic (DFL)
- Spouse: JoAnn
- Children: 2
- Education: University of North Dakota; Utah State University
- Occupation: Ecologist, writer

Glen A. Sherwood (born May 7, 1934) is an American politician in the state of Minnesota. He served in the Minnesota House of Representatives from 1973 to 1982.
