= Alvin Setzepfandt =

American politician

Alvin Otto Henry Setzepfandt (February 7, 1924 – January 7, 2013) was an American veterinarian and politician.

Born in Eagle Grove, Iowa, Setzepfandt graduated from Will Rogers High School in Tulsa, Oklahoma. During World War II, he served in the United States Army Veterinary Corps. In 1945, he received his degree in veterinary medicine from Iowa State University. He practiced in Bird Island, Minnesota. He served on the Bird Island City Council 1951 to 1953 and as mayor from 1954 to 1970. From 1971 to 1974, Setzepfandt served as Renville County, Minnesota commissioner. From 1975 to 1977, Setzepfandt served in the Minnesota House of Representatives and then in the Minnesota Senate from 1977 to 1982. He was a Democrat. He died in Olivia, Minnesota.
