= Franklin J. Knoll =

American lawyer

Franklin J. Knoll (born April 30, 1940) is an American lawyer, judge, and politician.

Knoll was born in St. Cloud, Minnesota and graduated from St. John's Preparatory School in Collegeville, Minnesota. He served in the United States Navy and was commissioned a lieutenant. Knoll graduated from College of Saint Benedict and Saint John's University with a bachelor's degree in biology and chemistry in 1962. Knoll then received his J.D. degree from University of Minnesota Law School and was admitted to the Minnesota bar. He also went to the Harvard Law School in 1978 on a fellowship: Bush Leader Fellowship. Knoll lived in Minneapolis, Minnesota with his wife and family. He practiced law in Minneapolis and served as a Hennepin County Public Defender. Knoll served in the Minnesota House of Representatives from 1974 to 1976 and in the Minnesota Senate from 1977 to 1982. He was a Democrat. Knoll also served as a Minnesota District Court judge for Hennepin County, Minnesota.
