= Doug J. St. Onge =

American politician (1934–2021)

Douglas James St. Onge

Member of the Minnesota House of Representatives from the 4A district
- In office January 4, 1983 – January 7, 1985
- In office January 2, 1973 – January 2, 1979

Personal details
- Born: February 14, 1934 Saint Paul, Minnesota, U.S.
- Died: July 11, 2021 (aged 87) Bemidji, Minnesota, U.S.
- Party: Minnesota Democratic–Farmer–Labor Party
- Spouse: Theresa
- Children: 6
- Education: University of North Dakota, Bemidji State University
- Occupation: Plumber, Teacher

Douglas James St. Onge (February 14, 1934 – July 11, 2021) was an American politician in the state of Minnesota. He served in the Minnesota House of Representatives from 1973-1979 and 1983-1985. St. Onge was born in Saint Paul, Minnesota and graduated from Washington High School in Brainerd, Minnesota. He went to University of North Dakota, Bemidji State University and, College of Saint Benedict and Saint John's University in Collegeville, Minnesota. He taught in high school and owned a plumbing business in Bemidji, Minnesota.
