= Maurice J. Zaffke =

American politician and farmer

Maurice J. Zaffke (born January 27, 1948) was an American politician and farmer.

Zaffke lived in Backus, Cass County, Minnesota with his wife and family and was a farmer. He went to University of Minnesota, College of Agriculture, and graduated from Bethel University. Zaffke served in the Minnesota House of Representatives from 1983 to 1986 and was a Republican.
