= Donald L. Friedrich =

American politician (1929–2021)

Member of the Minnesota House of Representatives from the 32B district
- In office 1975–1981

Personal details
- Born: July 7, 1929 Rochester, Minnesota, U.S.
- Died: May 8, 2021 (aged 91) Rochester, Minnesota, U.S.
- Party: Independent Republican
- Occupation: Beef Farmer

Donald L. Friedrich (July 7, 1929 – May 8, 2021) was an American politician in the state of Minnesota. He served in the Minnesota House of Representatives from 1975 to 1981 (district 32B).
