= Mike Jaros =

American politician

Member of the Minnesota House of Representatives from the 7B district
- In office 1972-1980, 1984 - Present

Personal details
- Born: April 12, 1944 (age 82) Braunschweig, Germany
- Party: Democratic Farmer Labor Party
- Spouse: Annette
- Education: Salvatonien Seminary, University of Minnesota, College of Saint Scholastica
- Occupation: Diplomat, restaurateur, lobbyist

Mike Jaros was a Democratic Farmer Labor Party member of the Minnesota House of Representatives, representing District 7B from 1984 to 2009. He had also previously served from 1972 to 1980. Jaros decided not to seek reelection on June 16, 2008. Liz Olson currently represents District 7B.

He wrote an article in the East European Genealogist in 2005 examining his own family tree, which consisted of Galician Poles.
