= John Watson Milton =

American politician (1935–2023)

John Watson Milton (August 19, 1935 – July 3, 2023) was an American politician, writer, and businessman.

John Milton was born in Saint Paul, Minnesota. He attended St. Paul Academy and Summit School and then received his bachelor's degree from Princeton University. Milton was a management consultant and health planner. He lived in White Bear Lake, Minnesota and served on the Ramsey County, Minnesota Board of Commissioners. From 1973 to 1977, Milton served in the Minnesota Senate as a Democrat.

In 2012, Milton published a book about Minnesota State Senator Nick Coleman, entitled For The Good of the Order.

Milton died at his home in White Bear Lake on July 3, 2023 at the age of 87.
