= Walter R. Hanson =

American politician

Walter "Wally" R. Hanson (March 26, 1931 – August 7, 2014) was an American politician.

Born in Saint Paul, Minnesota, Hanson served in the United States Air Force during the Korean War. He went to University of Minnesota. Hanson worked for Great Northern/Burling Northern Railroad and was an accountant. He served in the Minnesota House of Representatives from 1971 to 1982 and was a member of the Democratic Party. He died in Cottage Grove, Minnesota which was his home town.
