= Robert O. Ashbach =

American politician

- Ashbach c. 1981–1982

Minnesota Senate Minority Leader
- In office January 1975 – January 3, 1983
- Preceded by: Harold G. Krieger
- Succeeded by: James E. Ulland

Member of the Minnesota Senate
- In office January 3, 1967 – January 3, 1983
- Preceded by: John Anderson
- Succeeded by: Tad Jude
- Constituency: 49th (1967-1972; 48th (1973-1982)

Member of the Minnesota House of Representatives from the 43rd district
- In office January 8, 1963 – January 3, 1967
- Preceded by: Dick Jones
- Succeeded by: Bob Pavlak

Mayor of Arden Hills, Minnesota
- In office January 1, 1952 – January 1, 1963

Personal details
- Born: July 8, 1916 Waconia, Minnesota, U.S.
- Died: October 23, 1990 (aged 74) St. Paul, Minnesota, U.S.
- Party: Republican
- Spouse: Marjorie
- Relations: Tom Emmer (nephew-in-law)
- Children: 3
- Education: Carlton College; University of Pennsylvania
- Occupation: Economist/Tree Farmer

Robert Otto Ashbach (July 18, 1916 – October 23, 1990) was an American politician, businessman, and farmer.

== Biography ==
Ashbach was born in Waconia, Minnesota and grew up in Roseville, Minnesota. He went to the public schools and to Bethel Academy High School in Saint Paul, Minnesota. He went to University of Minnesota and studied forestry. He worked in construction and was President of the Ashbach Construction Company. Ashbach also was involved in the banking business. Ashbach lived with his wife and family in Arden Hills, Minnesota. He served on the Arden Hills City Council from 1950 and then served as mayor of Arden Hills from 1952 to 1963. Ashbach also served on the school board in 1985 and was a Republican. Ashbach served in the Minnesota House of Representatives from 1963 to 1966 and in the Minnesota Senate from 1967 to 1982. Ashbach died in a hospital in Saint Paul, Minnesota after undergoing open heart surgery.

Minnesota House of Representatives
Preceded by Howard R. Albertson	Member of the Minnesota House of Representatives from the 43rd district 1963–1967; Served alongside: John Tracy Anderson	Succeeded by Bob Pavlak
Minnesota Senate
Preceded by Wendell R. Anderson	Member of the Minnesota Senate from the 49th district 1967–1973	Succeeded by John Watson Milton
Preceded by John Tracy Anderson	Member of the Minnesota Senate from the 48th district 1973–1983	Succeeded by Tad Jude
Preceded by Harold G. Krieger	Minority Leader of the Minnesota Senate; 1975–1983	Succeeded by James E. Ulland
