= Robert J. Tennessen =

American politician from Minnesota

Member of the Minnesota Senate from the 56th district
- In office 1973–1982

Member of the Minnesota Senate from the 38th district
- In office 1971–1972

Personal details
- Born: August 24, 1939 (age 87) Lismore, Minnesota, U.S.
- Party: Minnesota Democratic–Farmer–Labor Party
- Education: University of Minnesota, University of Minnesota Law School
- Occupation: Attorney

Robert J. Tennessen (born August 24, 1939) is an American politician in the state of Minnesota. He served in the Minnesota Senate.
