= Douglas Ewald =

American politician (1937–2021)

Douglas Rex Ewald
- Born: July 8, 1937; Minneapolis, Minnesota
- Died: October 20, 2021 (aged 84)
- Education: University of Minnesota
- Occupations: Politician, Consultant
- Political party: Republican

Douglas Rex Ewald (July 8, 1937 – October 20, 2021) was an American politician and consultant.

Ewald was born in Minneapolis, Minnesota and graduated from Minneapolis North High School. He received his bachelor's degree and his master's degree in hospital administration from the University of Minnesota. Ewald lived in Minnetonka, Minnesota with his wife, Virginia Ewald, and family. Ewald served in the Minnesota House of Representatives from 1975 to 1982 and was a Republican.
