= Arlene Ione Lehto =

American politician and businesswoman

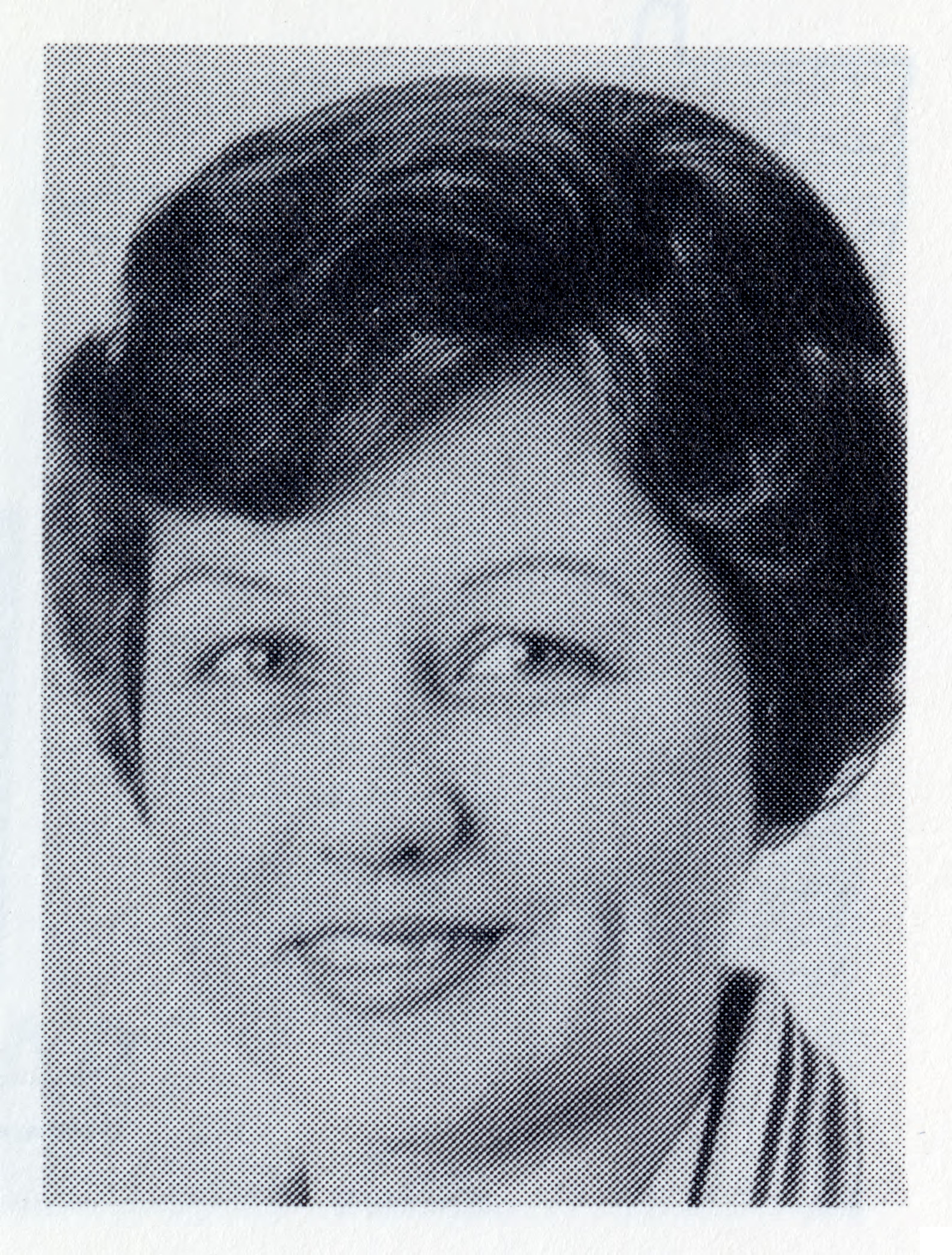

Member of the Minnesota House of Representatives from district 8A.

Arlene Ione Lehto (born September 14, 1939) is an American former politician and businesswoman.

Lehto was born in Duluth, Minnesota and graduated from the Two Harbors High School in Two Harbors, Minnesota. She went to University of Minnesota Duluth majoring in speech and political science. Lehto also went to vocational school. Lehto lived with her husband and family in Duluth. She was a licensed cosmetologist and was in the printing business. Lehto served in the Minnesota House of Representatives from 1977 to 1982 and was a Democrat.
