= Ray Welker =

American politician

Member of the Minnesota House of Representatives from the 20B district
- In office 1991–1992
- In office 1983–1984

Member of the Minnesota House of Representatives from the 20A district
- In office 1979–1982

Personal details
- Born: April 19, 1939 (age 87) Jackson County, Minnesota, U.S.
- Party: Republican
- Spouse: Karen
- Children: three
- Education: Minnesota State University, Mankato
- Occupation: businessman, farmer, teacher

Ray William Welker (born April 19, 1939) is an American politician in the state of Minnesota. He served in the Minnesota House of Representatives.
