= Robert W. Reif =

American politician (1921–2011)

Robert William "Bob" Reif (July 29, 1921 – February 7, 2011) was an American politician and physician.

Reif was born in Saint Paul, Minnesota and graduated from Cretin-Derham Hall High School in Saint Paul, Minnesota. He served in the United States Army, in the medical corps reserve, during World War II. Reif graduated from the University of St. Thomas and from the University of Minnesota Medical School in 1949. He lived in White Bear Lake, Minnesota with his wife and family and was a physician and educator. Reif served in the Minnesota House of Representatives from 1979 to 1984 and was a Republican.
