= John T. Clawson =

American politician

John T. Clawson (August 7, 1945 – August 17, 2011) was an American politician and Lutheran minister.

Clawson was born in Saint Paul, Minnesota and was raised in Bloomington, Minnesota. He graduated from Bloomington High School. Clawson received his bachelor's degree in classical languages, American history, and theology from Augsburg University in 1969 and his master's degree in theology from Northwestern Lutheran Theological Seminary (now Luther Seminary) in 1971. Clawson worked for the Minnesota Department of Human Services and the Minnesota State Council for the Handicapped. Clawson served as pastor for Lutheran churches in Harris, Minnesota and in Stanchfield, Minnesota. He also served as a chaplain for Hazelden Foundation in Center City, Minnesota. Clawson served in the Minnesota House of Representatives from 1975 until 1984 and was a Democrat. Clawson died suddenly at his home in Minneapolis, Minnesota.
