= Eric D. Petty =

American politician and businessman

Eric D. Petty (born July 10, 1954) was an American politician and businessman.

Petty lived in Minneapolis, Minnesota, with his wife and family. He received his bachelor's degree in political science from Occidental College and his master's degree in finance from Wharton School of the University of Pennsylvania. Petty was the manager of the Corporate Communications Donaldson Company, Inc. Petty served in the Minnesota Senate from 1981 to 1986 and was a Democrat.
