= Thomas R. Berkelman =

American politician

Thomas Berkelman

Member of the Minnesota House of Representatives
- In office 1977–1983

Personal details
- Born: Thomas Roger Berkelman; May 2, 1949 (age 77)
- Party: Democratic
- Spouse: Kathleen A. Blatz (divorced)
- Education: University of Minnesota Duluth (BA); California State University, Long Beach (MA)

Thomas Roger Berkelman (born May 2, 1949) is an American politician who served in the Minnesota House of Representatives from 1977 to 1983.

== Education ==
Berkelman earned a Bachelor of Arts degree in history and political science from University of Minnesota Duluth in 1971 and his master's degree in public communications and political science from California State University, Long Beach in 1973. Berkelman also studied at the European Study Center in Luxembourg.

== Career ==
Berkelman worked for Duluth Public and Industrial Relations and for the Anderson-Ryan Company. Berkelman served in the Minnesota House of Representatives from 1977 to 1983 and was a Democrat.

== Personal life ==
He was married to Kathleen A. Blatz who also served in the Minnesota Legislature; they were then divorced.
