= Bird Island, Minnesota =

City in Minnesota, United States

Bird Island
- City
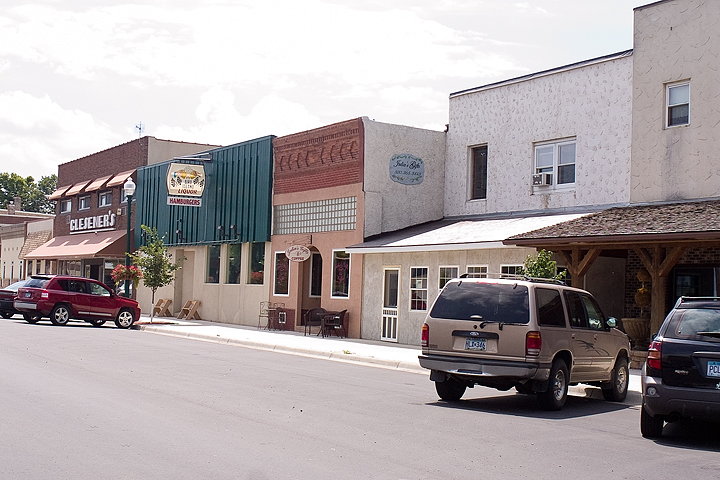
- Downtown Bird Island, August 2008

- Location of Bird Island, Minnesota
- Coordinates: 44°45′54″N 94°53′39″W
- Country: United States
- State: Minnesota
- County: Renville
- Founded: 1878
- Incorporated: 1881

Government
  - Type: Mayor — Council
  - Mayor: Julie Sander

Area
  - Total: 1.53 sq mi (3.95 km^{2})
  - Land: 1.53 sq mi (3.95 km^{2})
  - Water: 0 sq mi (0.00 km^{2})
- Elevation: 1,093 ft (333 m)

Population (2020)
  - Total: 1,005
  - Estimate (2022): 989
  - Density: 659.2/sq mi (254.53/km^{2})
- Time zone: UTC-6 (Central)
  - Summer (DST): UTC-5 (CDT)
- ZIP code: 55310
- Area code: 320
- FIPS code: 27-06076
- GNIS feature ID: 2394173
- Website: birdislandcity.com

Bird Island is a town located on U.S. Route 212 in Renville County, Minnesota, United States. The population was 1,005 at the 2020 census.

== History ==
Bird Island was platted in 1878, and named for a nearby bird sanctuary in a marsh. After the installation of ditches and tile, the area was converted to farmland, erasing the town's namesake.

A post office has been in operation at Bird Island since 1878. Bird Island was incorporated in 1881.

== Geography ==
According to the United States Census Bureau, the city has a total area of 1.53 square miles (3.96 km^{2}), all land.

== Demographics ==
Historical population
Census	Pop.	Note	%±
1880	289		—
1890	441		52.6%
1900	846		91.8%
1910	931		10.0%
1920	976		4.8%
1930	1,004		2.9%
1940	1,201		19.6%
1950	1,333		11.0%
1960	1,384		3.8%
1970	1,309		−5.4%
1980	1,372		4.8%
1990	1,326		−3.4%
2000	1,195		−9.9%
2010	1,042		−12.8%
2020	1,005		−3.6%
2022 (est.)	989		−1.6%
U.S. Decennial Census; 2020 Census

=== 2010 census ===
As of the census of 2010, there were 1,042 people, 487 households, and 274 families living in the city. The population density was 681.0 inhabitants per square mile (262.9/km^{2}). There were 547 housing units at an average density of 357.5 per square mile (138.0/km^{2}). The racial makeup of the city was 97.2% White, 0.4% African American, 0.2% Asian, 0.2% Pacific Islander, 1.2% from other races, and 0.9% from two or more races. Hispanic or Latino of any race were 3.2% of the population.

There were 487 households, of which 21.6% had children under the age of 18 living with them, 44.8% were married couples living together, 8.0% had a female householder with no husband present, 3.5% had a male householder with no wife present, and 43.7% were non-families. 38.6% of all households were made up of individuals, and 17.7% had someone living alone who was 65 years of age or older. The average household size was 2.11 and the average family size was 2.77.

The median age in the city was 48.4 years. 20.2% of residents were under the age of 18; 6.1% were between the ages of 18 and 24; 18.9% were from 25 to 44; 34.3% were from 45 to 64; and 20.5% were 65 years of age or older. The gender makeup of the city was 49.8% male and 50.2% female.

=== 2000 census ===
As of the census of 2000, there were 1,195 people, 499 households, and 303 families living in the city. The population density was 773.6 inhabitants per square mile (298.7/km^{2}). There were 530 housing units at an average density of 343.1 per square mile (132.5/km^{2}). The racial makeup of the city was 96.82% White, 0.25% Native American, 0.33% Asian, 0.08% Pacific Islander, 1.09% from other races, and 1.42% from two or more races. Hispanic or Latino of any race were 2.59% of the population.

There were 499 households, out of which 28.5% had children under the age of 18 living with them, 52.5% were married couples living together, 5.4% had a female householder with no husband present, and 39.1% were non-families. 35.5% of all households were made up of individuals, and 19.6% had someone living alone who was 65 years of age or older. The average household size was 2.31 and the average family size was 3.03.

In the city, the population was spread out, with 24.6% under the age of 18, 5.9% from 18 to 24, 25.1% from 25 to 44, 20.4% from 45 to 64, and 23.9% who were 65 years of age or older. The median age was 42 years. For every 100 females, there were 101.9 males. For every 100 females age 18 and over, there were 95.0 males.

The median income for a household in the city was $38,092, and the median income for a family was $48,750. Males had a median income of $31,063 versus $23,056 for females. The per capita income for the city was $18,700. About 4.8% of families and 8.1% of the population were below the poverty line, including 6.7% of those under age 18 and 12.5% of those age 65 or over.

== Arts and culture ==
The Centre offers monthly art exhibits, music lessons, social gatherings, art classes, writing seminars, story shows, yoga, and more.

The Renville County Fair is an annual event in Bird Island. The fair is held each August.

The Tinnes-Baker House is an early 1900 Craftsman-style design brick house on Highway 212 (the historic Yellowstone Trail) in downtown Bird Island, and is listed in the National Register of Historic Places.

America's 250th Celebration in Bird Island MN included a limited edition commemorative hanky designed by LoriLouArt and made available at local businesses by Island Days committee volunteers. Island Days, held each June, is a project of the nonprofit Bird Island Civic & Commerce Association.

== Notable people ==
- Roger L. Dell, Chief Justice of the Minnesota Supreme Court
- Alvin Setzepfandt, veterinarian and politician
- Brian E. Sheehan, 2022-2023 International President of Lions Clubs International
