= Edgerton, Minnesota =

City in Minnesota, United States

Edgerton
- City
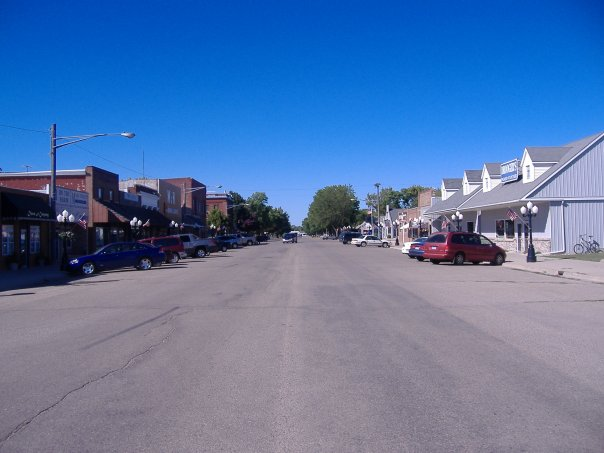
- Downtown Edgerton, Minnesota

- Location of Edgerton, Minnesota
- Coordinates: 43°52′31″N 96°07′50″W
- Country: United States
- State: Minnesota
- County: Pipestone

Government
  - Type: Mayor – Council
  - Mayor: Jason Snyder

Area
  - Total: 1.18 sq mi (3.05 km^{2})
  - Land: 1.18 sq mi (3.05 km^{2})
  - Water: 0.0039 sq mi (0.01 km^{2})
- Elevation: 1,578 ft (481 m)

Population (2020)
  - Total: 1,258
  - Density: 1,069.9/sq mi (413.09/km^{2})
- Time zone: UTC-6 (Central (CST))
  - Summer (DST): UTC-5 (CDT)
- ZIP code: 56128
- Area code: 507
- FIPS code: 27-18152
- GNIS feature ID: 2394618
- Website: www.edgertonmn.com

Edgerton is a city in Pipestone County, Minnesota, United States, located along the Rock River. The population was 1,258 at the 2020 census.

== History ==
Edgerton was platted in 1879, and named for Alonzo J. Edgerton, a Minnesota politician. A post office has been in operation at Edgerton since 1879. Edgerton was incorporated in 1887.

== Geography ==
According to the United States Census Bureau, the city has a total area of 1.16 square miles (3.00 km^{2}), all land.

== Demographics ==
Historical population
Census	Pop.	Note	%±
1880	86		—
1890	178		107.0%
1900	450		152.8%
1910	381		−15.3%
1920	657		72.4%
1930	627		−4.6%
1940	815		30.0%
1950	961		17.9%
1960	1,019		6.0%
1970	1,119		9.8%
1980	1,123		0.4%
1990	1,106		−1.5%
2000	1,033		−6.6%
2010	1,189		15.1%
2020	1,258		5.8%
U.S. Decennial Census

=== 2010 census ===
As of the census of 2010, there were 1,189 people, 491 households, and 322 families residing in the city. The population density was 1,025.0 inhabitants per square mile (395.8/km^{2}). There were 525 housing units at an average density of 452.6 per square mile (174.7/km^{2}). The racial makeup of the city was 95.3% White, 0.3% African American, 0.8% Asian, 2.1% from other races, and 1.5% from two or more races. Hispanic or Latino of any race were 3.6% of the population.

There were 491 households, of which 26.5% had children under the age of 18 living with them, 60.3% were married couples living together, 3.1% had a female householder with no husband present, 2.2% had a male householder with no wife present, and 34.4% were non-families. 32.0% of all households were made up of individuals, and 20.8% had someone living alone who was 65 years of age or older. The average household size was 2.30 and the average family size was 2.91.

The median age in the city was 46 years. 23.5% of residents were under the age of 18; 6% were between the ages of 18 and 24; 19.2% were from 25 to 44; 21.5% were from 45 to 64; and 29.9% were 65 years of age or older. The gender makeup of the city was 46.9% male and 53.1% female.

=== 2000 census ===
As of the census of 2000, there were 1,033 people, 435 households, and 287 families residing in the city. The population density was 890.2 inhabitants per square mile (343.7/km^{2}). There were 477 housing units at an average density of 411.1 per square mile (158.7/km^{2}). The racial makeup of the city was 98.84% White, 0.29% Asian, 0.87% from other races. Hispanic or Latino of any race were 0.68% of the population.

There were 435 households, out of which 26.0% had children under the age of 18 living with them, 63.2% were married couples living together, 2.1% had a female householder with no husband present, and 33.8% were non-families. 32.9% of all households were made up of individuals, and 25.5% had someone living alone who was 65 years of age or older. The average household size was 2.24 and the average family size was 2.85.

In the city, the population was spread out, with 21.8% under the age of 18, 4.4% from 18 to 24, 17.9% from 25 to 44, 21.8% from 45 to 64, and 34.2% who were 65 years of age or older. The median age was 50 years. For every 100 females, there were 85.8 males. For every 100 females age 18 and over, there were 77.6 males.

The median income for a household in the city was $30,104, and the median income for a family was $39,318. Males had a median income of $30,968 versus $19,479 for females. The per capita income for the city was $15,517. About 2.7% of families and 4.9% of the population were below the poverty line, including 1.7% of those under age 18 and 10.3% of those age 65 or over.

== Politics ==
Edgerton is located in Minnesota's 7th congressional district, represented by Michelle Fischbach, a Republican. At the state level, Edgerton is located in Senate District 21, represented by Republican Bill Weber, and in House District 21A, represented by Republican Joe Schomacker. The city is governed by a four-seat city council plus a mayor. Two of the council seats are elected for four year terms while the other two seats are elected for two year terms to ensure continuity of effectiveness. Currently, Ron Williams is the longest serving council member.

== 1960 State Basketball Champions ==
Until 1970, there was only one class in the Minnesota High School Basketball Tournament. The eight regional winners would be seeded and play each other at Williams Arena to crown that year's champion. The smallest school to ever win the state title was the 1960 Edgerton Flying Dutchmen with an enrollment, at that time, of 94 students. Although much more well known, the 1954 Milan High School basketball team of Hoosiers fame, who won the one-class Indiana High School Boys Basketball Tournament, had an enrollment more than 50% larger than Edgerton at 161 students.

Edgerton would upset Mankato in the Region 2 tournament, then defeat Chisholm and Richfield, Minnesota, a suburb of the Twin Cities, in the first two games of the state tournament before upending perennial powerhouse Austin in the championship game, 72–61. Four of Edgerton's five starters (Dean Verdoes, Dean Veenhof, Darrell Kreun, and Leroy Graphenteen) would be named to the 1960 All-Tournament Team. Edgerton finished the 1960 season undefeated at 27–0. In 2010, members of the Edgerton and Austin teams were welcomed back to Target Center for a 50th Anniversary celebration at the start of that year's State Basketball Tournament.
