= Bruce W. Anderson =

American politician, teacher and businessman

Buzz Anderson

Member of the Minnesota House of Representatives
- In office January 1, 1977 – January 6, 1985
- Constituency: 26A district (1977–1983); 28A district (1983–1985)

Personal details
- Born: Bruce W. Anderson; January 17, 1948 (age 78) Luverne, Minnesota, U.S.
- Party: Democratic (DFL)
- Education: Minnesota State University, Mankato (BA, BS)

Bruce W. "Buzz" Anderson (January 17, 1948) is an American politician, teacher, and businessman.

== Biography ==
Anderson was born in Luverne, Rock County, Minnesota and graduated from Luverne High School in 1966. He went to Concordia College in Saint Paul, Minnesota. Anderson received his two bachelor's degrees in political science and social studies education from Minnesota State University, Mankato. He was a social studies teacher and was a journalist who worked for the Mankato Free Press. Anderson also worked for the Minnesota Department of Agriculture. He lived in Slayton, Murray County, Minnesota with his wife and family. Anderson served in the Minnesota House of Representatives from 1977 to 1985 and was a Democrat.
