= Marilyn Lantry =

American politician (1932–2023)

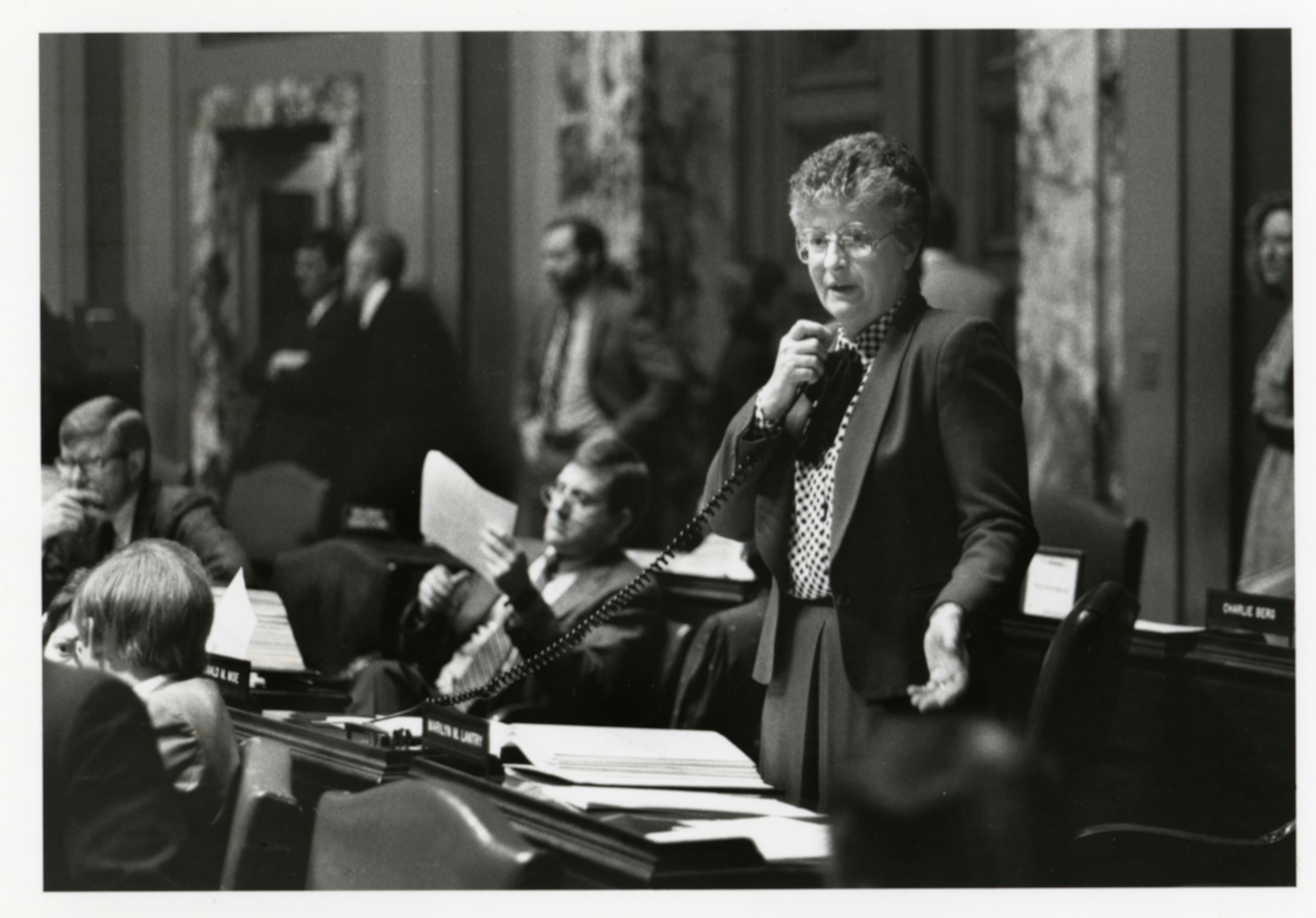

Member of the Minnesota Senate from the 67th district
- In office 1981–1990

Personal details
- Born: Marilyn Martha Kunz; October 28, 1932 Saint Paul, Minnesota, U.S.
- Died: March 28, 2023 (aged 90)
- Party: Democratic (DFL)
- Spouse: Jerome H. Lantry
- Children: 2
- Occupation: Legislative aide

Marilyn Martha Lantry (October 28, 1932 – March 28, 2023) was an American politician in the state of Minnesota. She served in the Minnesota Senate from 1981 to 1990. Lantry died on March 28, 2023, at the age of 90.
