= Gaylin Den Ouden =

American politician

Member of the Minnesota House of Representatives from the 21B district
- In office 1977–1986

Personal details
- Born: October 9, 1945 (age 80) Edgerton, Minnesota, U.S.
- Party: Republican
- Spouse: Cobie
- Children: 4
- Education: Dordt College; Southwest Minnesota State University
- Occupation: teacher

Gaylin La Roy Den Ouden (born October 9, 1945) is an American politician in the state of Minnesota. He served in the Minnesota House of Representatives.
