= David O. Fjoslien =

American politician (1936–2004)

David O. Fjoslien (July 23, 1936 – December 14, 2004) was an American politician, farmer, and businessman.

Fjoslein was born in Elbow Lake. Minnesota, in Grant County, Minnesota. He lived in Brandon, Minnesota and graduated from Brandon High School. He went to the University of Minnesota School of Agriculture. Fjoslien served in the United States Army as an aviator and paratrooper and in the Minnesota National Guard as an aviator. Fjoslien lived on a grain and beef cattle farm with his wife and family near Brandon, Minnesota. He was an airplane pilot and had an aerial spraying business. Fjoslien served in the Minnesota House of Representatives from 1973 to 1986 and was a Republican. He died in Branson, Minnesota.
