= Dick Kostohryz =

American politician (1930–1994)

Richard J. "Dick" Kostohryz Sr. (April 30, 1930 – May 12, 1994) was an American politician, businessman, and police officer.

Kostohryz was born in Saint Paul, Minnesota and graduated from Monroe High School in Saint Paul. Minnesota. He served in the United States Navy during the Korean War. Kostohryz went to the University of Minnesota and took extension courses. He served in the Saint Paul Police Department and worked for 3M as a technologist. Kostohryz lived with his wife and family in North St. Paul, Minnesota. He served in the Minnesota House of Representatives from 1974 to 1990 and was a Democrat. He died from a heart attack in North St. Paul. Minnesota. Kostohryz was buried in Fort Snelling National Cemetery.
