= Tony Onnen =

American politician

Member of the Minnesota House of Representatives from the 20B district
- In office 1993–1994

Member of the Minnesota House of Representatives from the 22B district
- In office 1977–1992

Personal details
- Born: July 5, 1938 (age 88)
- Party: Republican
- Spouse: JoAnn
- Children: 5
- Education: University of Nebraska–Lincoln
- Occupation: accountant

Tony Dee Onnen (born July 5, 1938) is an American politician in the state of Minnesota. He served in the Minnesota House of Representatives.
