= John D. Tomlinson =

American politician (1929–1992)

John D. Tomlinson (December 3, 1929 – July 1, 1992) was an American politician and businessman.

Tomlinson was born in Oak Park, Illinois. He served in the United States Navy from 1952 to 1955 and was a supply officer. Tomlinson received his bachelor's degree in chemical engineering from the University of Minnesota in 1955. Tomlinson lived in Saint Paul, Minnesota with his wife and family. He worked for 3M and was a chemical engineer. Tomlinson served in the Minnesota House of Representatives from 1973 to 1986 and was a Democrat. He then served as an assistant commissioner for the Minnesota Department of Revenue and with the Minnesota Governor's Consumer Affairs Advisory Council. He died suddenly while playing tennis.
