= John Sarna =

American politician (1935–2021)

Member of the Minnesota House of Representatives from the 59A district
- In office 1993–1996

Member of the Minnesota House of Representatives from the 58A district
- In office 1983–1992

Member of the Minnesota House of Representatives from the 55A district
- In office 1973–1982

Personal details
- Born: March 9, 1935 Minneapolis, Minnesota, U.S.
- Died: April 20, 2021 (aged 86) Minneapolis, Minnesota, U.S.
- Party: Minnesota Democratic–Farmer–Labor Party
- Spouse: Ann
- Children: two
- Occupation: Labor Official

John Joseph Sarna (March 9, 1935 – April 20, 2021) was an American politician in the state of Minnesota. He served in the Minnesota House of Representatives from 1972 to 1996 and was a Democrat. Sarna was born in Minneapolis, Minnesota and was involved with the United Auto Workers.
