= Tom Osthoff =

American politician (1936–2025)

Member of the Minnesota House of Representatives from the 66A district
- In office January 4, 1984 – January 6, 2003

Member of the Minnesota House of Representatives from the 64A district
- In office January 7, 1975 – January 3, 1983

Personal details
- Born: November 8, 1936 Ramsey County, Minnesota, U.S.
- Died: January 9, 2025 (aged 88)
- Party: Democratic (DFL)
- Spouse: Sandra Lund
- Children: One
- Education: University of Minnesota
- Occupation: Teacher

Cyril Thomas Osthoff (November 8, 1936 – January 9, 2025) was an American politician in the state of Minnesota. He served in the Minnesota House of Representatives from 1983 to 2003 as a member of the Democratic-Farmer-Labor party. Osthoff died on January 9, 2025, at the age of 88.
