= Neil Dieterich =

American lawyer

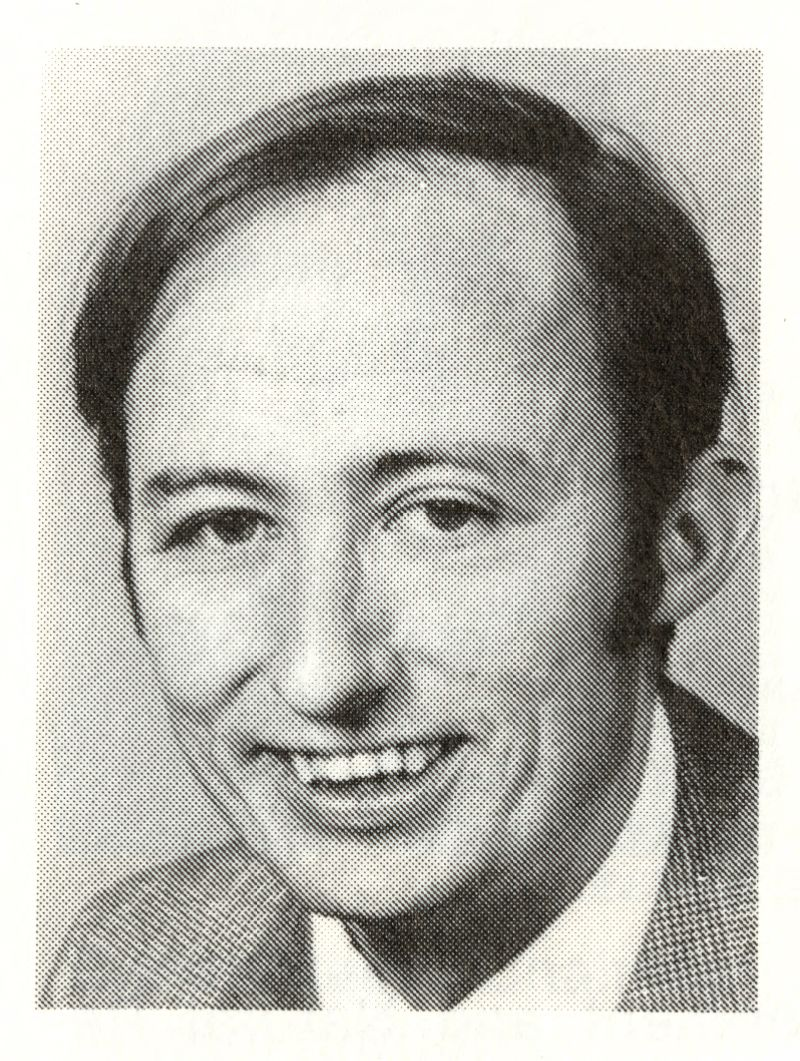

Member of the Minnesota House of Representatives from district 62A
- In office January 1, 1973 – January 2, 1977

Member of the Minnesota Senate from district 62
- In office January 3, 1977 – January 2, 1983

Member of the Minnesota Senate from district 63
- In office January 3, 1983 – January 4, 1987

Neil Dieterich (born March 28, 1943) was an American politician and lawyer.

Dieterich was born in Lincoln, Nebraska. He received his bachelor's degrees from Wharton School of the University of Pennsylvania and from the University of Minnesota. Dieterich also received his Juris Doctor degree from the University of Minnesota Law School and was admitted to the Minnesota bar. He lived with his wife and family in Saint Paul, Minnesota. Dieterich served in the Minnesota House of Representatives from 1973 to 1976 and in the Minnesota Senate from 1977 to 1986. He was a Democrat.
