= Robert L. Ellingson =

American politician

Robert L. "Bob" Ellingson (born September 3, 1950) is an American lawyer and politician.

Born in Minneapolis, Minnesota, Ellingson graduated from Brooklyn Center High School in 1967. In 1971, he received his bachelor's degree in government and international relations from Carleton College. In 1986, Ellingson received his master's degree from the John F. Kennedy School of Government at Harvard University. In 1975, Ellingson received his Juris Doctor degree from the University of Minnesota Law School and then practiced law in Brooklyn Center, Minnesota. From 1977 to 1987, Ellingson served in the Minnesota House of Representatives and was a Democrat. Ellingson served on the Hennepin County, Minnesota Parks Board from 1987 to 1990. He also served on the Minnetonka, Minnesota city council from 2004 to 2020.
