= Ken G. Nelson =

American politician (born 1936)

Ken Nelson
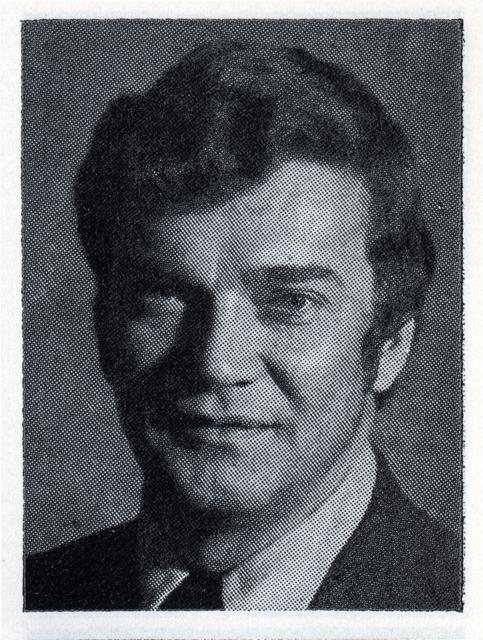

Member of the Minnesota House of Representatives from the 62A district
- In office 1983–1992

Member of the Minnesota House of Representatives from the 59B district
- In office 1973–1982

Personal details
- Born: May 22, 1936 (age 90) Grant County, Minnesota
- Party: Minnesota Democratic–Farmer–Labor Party
- Spouse: Joan Peterson
- Children: Mark Nelson; Matt Nelson
- Education: Augsburg University (BS); Sri Venkateswara University; University of Minnesota; Northwestern Lutheran Theological Seminary (MA); Harvard University (MA)
- Occupation: Clergyman; Politician; Veteran

Ken Nelson (born May 22, 1936) is a retired clergyman, politician, and veteran from Minnesota. He served in the Minnesota House of Representatives.

== Early life and career ==
He was born in Grant County, Minnesota. He served with the United States Army in France from 1954 to 1956.

== Political career ==
He represented District 59B to the state House from 1973 to 1982 and District 62A from 1983 to 1992.

== Personal life ==
When elected, he was a member of Mount Olivet Lutheran Church and lived in Minneapolis. After being elected he married Susan, and had three children.
