= Wes Skoglund =

American politician

Member of the Minnesota Senate from the 62nd district
- In office 2003–2006

Member of the Minnesota House of Representatives from the 62B district
- In office 1993–2002

Member of the Minnesota House of Representatives from the 61B district
- In office 1981–1992
- In office 1975–1978

Personal details
- Born: June 9, 1945 (age 81) Minneapolis, Minnesota, U.S.
- Party: Minnesota Democratic–Farmer–Labor Party
- Spouse: Linda Brown
- Children: 2
- Education: University of Minnesota
- Occupation: employee relations

Wesley John Skoglund (born June 9, 1945) is an American politician in the state of Minnesota. He served in the Minnesota House of Representatives and Minnesota State Senate.
