= Gary W. Laidig =

American politician

Member of the Minnesota Senate from the 55th and 56th district
- In office January 4, 1983 – January 2, 2001
- Preceded by: Gerry Sikorski
- Succeeded by: Michele Bachmann

Member of the Minnesota House of Representatives from the 51A district
- In office January 2, 1973 – January 3, 1983

Personal details
- Born: August 15, 1948 (age 78) York, Pennsylvania, U.S.
- Party: Republican Party of Minnesota
- Spouse: Gail
- Children: 2
- Education: University of Minnesota; Morningside College; University of Wisconsin-River Falls
- Occupation: Legislator, lobbyist, veteran

Gary W. Laidig (born August 15, 1948) is a Minnesota politician and a former member of the Minnesota Senate and the Minnesota House of Representatives. A Republican, he was first elected to the House in 1972, and represented the old District 51A for five terms. In 1982 he ran successfully for the Senate, and represented the old District 55 and, after the 1992 legislative redistricting, the old District 56 until 2001. While in office, he resided in Bayport and Stillwater. The various configurations of his district included portions of Washington County in the eastern Twin Cities metropolitan area. He was not endorsed for re-election in 2000, and was succeeded by Michele Bachmann.

== Service in the Minnesota House (1973–1983) ==
While in the House, Laidig served on the Agriculture, Appropriations, Criminal Justice, Education, General Legislation and Veterans Affairs, Health and Welfare, Local and Urban Affairs, Reapportionment and Elections, and Rules and Legislative Administration committees, and of various subcommittees relevant to each. He was chair of the Criminal Justice Subcommittee for Law Enforcement and Corrections during the 1979-1980 biennium.

In 1982, Laidig was one of two Republican cosponsors of the Acid Deposition Control Act, to regulate acid rain in Minnesota.

== Service in the Minnesota Senate (1983–2001) ==
While in the Senate, Laidig served on the Agriculture, Crime Prevention, Economic Development and Commerce, Ethics and Campaign Reform, Environment and Natural Resources, Judiciary, Metropolitan Affairs, Rules and Administration, Taxes and Tax Laws, Transportation, and Veterans and Military Affairs committees, and of various subcommittees relevant to each. His special legislative concerns while in office included taxes, the environment, economic development, and small business.

== Education and community service ==
Laidig graduated from Minnetonka High School in Minnetonka in 1966. He served in the United States Marine Corps, and was deployed in South Vietnam from 1968 to 1970 during the Vietnam War. He attended the University of Minnesota in Minneapolis, Morningside College in Sioux City, Iowa, and the University of Wisconsin in River Falls, Wisconsin, where he majored in pre-Law. Prior to running for public office, he served on the Washington County Juvenile Justice Advisory Committee. He is currently a lobbyist for the Ramsey County Sheriff's Department, and resides in Woodbury.
