= Pine Creek =

Pine Creek may refer to:

== Australia ==
- Pine Creek, Northern Territory (disambiguation), articles associated with the town and locality
- Pine Creek, Queensland, a locality in the Bundaberg Region, Queensland
- Pine Creek, South Australia, a locality

== Canada ==
- Pine Creek (British Columbia), in the Atlin Country region
- Pine Creek, Manitoba, Canada
- Pine Creek (Ontario), see list of rivers of Ontario

== United States ==
=== California ===
- Big Pine Creek (California), a tributary of the Owens River
- Pine Creek, former name of New Pine Creek, California
- Pine Creek (Lassen County), a tributary of Eagle Lake

=== Illinois ===
- Pine Creek (Rock River tributary)

=== Iowa ===
- Pine Creek (Upper Iowa River tributary), a tributary of the Upper Iowa River
- Pine Creek (Canoe Creek tributary), a tributary of Canoe Creek, also in the Upper Iowa River watershed
- Pine Creek Gristmill, listed on the National Register of Historic Places in Muscatine County

=== Minnesota ===
- Pinecreek, Minnesota, an unincorporated community in northwest Minnesota
- Pine Creek, Minnesota, an unincorporated community in southeast Minnesota
- Pine Creek (Mississippi River tributary)
- Pine Creek (Roseau River tributary), a stream

=== Missouri ===
- Pine Creek (Big Sugar Creek tributary) in McDonald County
- Pine Creek (Bryant Creek tributary) in Ozark County
- Pine Creek (Gasconade River tributary) in Laclede County
- Pine Creek (Jacks Fork tributary) in Howell and Texas counties

=== Montana ===
- Pine Creek, Montana

=== Nevada ===
- Pine Creek (Humboldt River tributary)

=== Pennsylvania ===
- Pine Creek (Pennsylvania), West Branch Susquehanna River tributary
- Pine Creek (Allegheny River tributary)
- Pine Creek (Huntington Creek tributary)
- Pine Creek (Mahantango Creek tributary)
- Pine Creek (Oil Creek tributary)
- Pine Creek (Penns Creek tributary)
- Pine Creek (Solomon Creek tributary), in Luzerne County, Pennsylvania

=== South Dakota ===
- Pine Creek (Little White River tributary)

=== Utah ===
- Pine Creek (Zion National Park), see Zion – Mount Carmel Highway

=== Virginia ===
- Pine Creek (Sandy Creek tributary), a stream in Pittsylvania County, Virginia

=== West Virginia ===
- Pine Creek, West Virginia

=== Wisconsin ===
- Pine Creek, Wisconsin, an unincorporated community
- Pine Creek (Sauk County, Wisconsin), a stream in Sauk County

== See also ==
- Pine Creek Township (disambiguation)
- Pine Creek Township, Pennsylvania (disambiguation)
- Pine Creek Rail Trail
- Pine Lake Creek
