= Minnesota's 1st Senate district =

American legislative district

Minnesota's 1st State Senate district
Senator
Mark Johnson; R–East Grand Forks
- Demographics: 92.0% White; 1.5% Black; 4.5% Hispanic; 1.2% Asian; 1.4% Native American <0.1% Hawaiian/Pacific Islander; 1.1% Other; 2.8% Multiracial
- Population (2020): 78,383

The 1st Senate district of Minnesota is one of 67 districts in the Minnesota Senate. Located in northwest Minnesota, the district comprises all of Kittson, Marshall, Norman,Pennington, Polk, Red Lake, and Roseau counties, as well as Felton, Hagen, and Ulen townships in Clay County. It is currently represented by Republican Mark Johnson, who has been in office since 2017.

== Current elected officials ==
Republican Mark Johnson is the senator representing the 1st district. He was first elected in 2016.

Each Minnesota State Senate district is composed of two Minnesota House of Representatives districts. The 1st district comprises House districts 1A and 1B. The current representatives of those districts are:

- House District 1A: John Burkel (R–Badger)
- House District 1B: Steve Gander (R–East Grand Forks)

== List of past senators ==
Image	Member	Party	Residence	Counties represented	Term start	Term end	Ref.
District created
	Hewitt L. Thomas	Rep.	Afton	Washington	December 2, 1857	December 6, 1859	
	Joel K. Reiner	Rep.	Stillwater	Washington	December 2, 1857	December 6, 1859	
	William McKusick	Rep.	Stillwater	Washington	December 7, 1859	January 7, 1861	
	Socrates Nelson	Dem.	Stillwater	Washington	December 7, 1859	January 7, 1861	
	James K. Smith Jr.	Rep.	Saint Paul	Ramsey	January 8, 1861	January 4, 1864	
	Edmund Rice	Dem.	Saint Paul	Ramsey	January 5, 1864	January 1, 1866	
	William Pitt Murray	Dem.	Saint Paul	Ramsey	January 2, 1866	January 6, 1868	
	George Loomis Becker	Dem.	Saint Paul	Ramsey	January 7, 1868	January 1, 1872	
	David L. Buell	Dem.	Caledonia	Houston	January 2, 1872	January 6, 1873	
	Edward Thompson	Rep.	Hokah	Houston	January 7, 1873	January 4, 1875	
	John H. Smith	N/A	Brownsville	Houston	January 5, 1875	January 1, 1877	
	John McNelly	Rep.	Wilmington	Houston	January 2, 1877	January 6, 1879	
	David L. Buell	Dem.	Caledonia	Houston	January 7, 1879	January 3, 1881	
	J. P. Schaller	N/A	Brownsville	Houston	January 4, 1881	January 1, 1883	
	James O'Brien	N/A	Caledonia	Houston	January 2, 1883	January 3, 1887	
	Tosten Johnson	Rep.	Black Hammer	Houston	January 3, 1887	January 4, 1891	
	James C. Kelly	Dem.	Yucatan	Houston	January 5, 1891	January 6, 1895	
	Elling K. Roverud	Rep.	Caledonia	Houston	January 7, 1895	January 4, 1903	
	Ole G. Laugen	Rep.	Houston	Houston	January 5, 1903	January 6, 1907	
	John Q. Briggs	Rep.	Houston	Houston	January 7, 1907	January 1, 1911	
	Francis A. Duxbury	Rep.	Caledonia	Houston	January 2, 1911	January 3, 1915	
	Francis A. Duxbury	Nonpart.	Caledonia	Fillmore, Houston	January 4, 1915	January 5, 1919	
	John W. Hopp	Nonpart.	Preston	Fillmore, Houston	January 6, 1919	December 31, 1922	
	T. E. Sorenson	Nonpart.	Chatfield	Fillmore, Houston	January 1, 1923	January 2, 1927	
	Henry A. Larson	Nonpart.	Preston	Fillmore, Houston	January 3, 1927	January 1, 1939	
	Henry A. Larson	NP. Con.	Preston	Fillmore, Houston	January 2, 1939	January 6, 1941	
	Henry A. Larson	Nonpart.	Preston	Fillmore, Houston	January 7, 1941	March 12, 1948	
--Vacant--				Fillmore, Houston	March 12, 1948	January 4, 1949	
	John A. Johnson	NP. Con.	Preston	Fillmore, Houston	January 4, 1949	January 4, 1959	
	Llewellyn W. Larson	NP. Con.	Mabel	Fillmore, Houston	January 5, 1959	January 1, 1967	
	Llewellyn W. Larson	NP. Con.	Mabel	Fillmore, Houston, Winona	January 2, 1967	December 31, 1972	
	Richard W. Fitzsimons	NP. Con.	Warren	Beltrami, Kittson, Lake of the Woods, Marshall, Pennington, Polk, Red Lake, Roseau	January 1, 1973	January 6, 1975	
	Richard W. Fitzsimons	Ind. Rep.	Warren	Beltrami, Kittson, Lake of the Woods, Marshall, Pennington, Polk, Red Lake, Roseau	January 7, 1975	January 2, 1977	
	Marv Hanson	DFL	Hallock	Beltrami, Kittson, Lake of the Woods, Marshall, Pennington, Polk, Red Lake, Roseau	January 3, 1977	January 2, 1983	
	LeRoy Stumpf	DFL	Plummer	Beltrami, Kittson, Lake of the Woods, Marshall, Pennington, Red Lake, Roseau	January 3, 1983	January 6, 1991	
	LeRoy Stumpf	DFL	Thief River Falls	Beltrami, Kittson, Lake of the Woods, Marshall, Pennington, Red Lake, Roseau	January 7, 1991	January 3, 1993	
	LeRoy Stumpf	DFL	Thief River Falls	Kittson, Lake of the Woods, Marshall, Pennington, Polk, Red Lake, Roseau	January 4, 1993	January 5, 2003	
	LeRoy Stumpf	DFL	Thief River Falls	Kittson, Marshall, Pennington, Polk, Red Lake, Roseau	January 5, 2003	December 31, 2006	
	LeRoy Stumpf	DFL	Plummer	Kittson, Marshall, Pennington, Polk, Red Lake, Roseau	January 1, 2007	January 1, 2017	
	Mark Johnson	Rep.	East Grand Forks	Kittson, Marshall, Pennington, Polk, Red Lake, Roseau	January 2, 2017	January 1, 2023	
	Mark Johnson	Rep.	East Grand Forks	Clay, Kittson, Marshall, Norman, Pennington, Polk, Red Lake, Roseau	January 2, 2023	Current	
