= Minnesota's 1A House of Representatives district =

American legislative district

Minnesota's 1A State House of Representatives district
Representative
John Burkel; R–Badger

District 1A of Minnesota is one of 134 districts in the Minnesota House of Representatives. Located in northwest Minnesota, the district comprises all of Kittson, Marshall, Pennington, and Roseau counties. The district is represented by Republican John Burkel since January 2021.

District 1A is located within Minnesota's 1st Senate district, alongside district 1B.

== List of past representatives ==
Member	Party	Residence	Counties represented	Term start	Term end	Ref.
District created
Clinton J. Hall	NP. Con.	Rushford	Fillmore	January 2, 1967	January 5, 1969	
Neil Sherman Haugerud	NP. Lib.	Preston	Fillmore, Mower, Olmsted	January 6, 1969	December 31, 1972	
Arthur Michael Braun	NP. Lib.	Greenbush	Beltrami, Kittson, Lake of the Woods, Marshall, Roseau	January 1, 1973	January 5, 1975	
Arthur Michael Braun	DFL.	Greenbush	Beltrami, Kittson, Lake of the Woods, Marshall, Roseau	January 6, 1975	December 31, 1978	
Myron E. Nysether	Ind. Rep.	Roseau	Beltrami, Kittson, Lake of the Woods, Marshall, Roseau	January 1, 1979	January 2, 1983	
Jim Tunheim	DFL.	Kennedy	Beltrami, Kittson, Lake of the Woods, Roseau	January 3, 1983	January 4, 1993	
Jim Tunheim	DFL.	Kennedy	Kittson, Lake of the Woods, Marshall, Roseau	January 4, 1993	December 31, 2000	
Maxine Penas	Rep.	Badger	Kittson, Lake of the Woods, Marshall, Roseau	January 1, 2001	January 5, 2003	
Maxine Penas	Rep.	Badger	Kittson, Marshall, Pennington, Roseau	January 6, 2003	December 31, 2006	
Dave Olin	DFL	Thief River Falls	Kittson, Marshall, Pennington, Roseau	January 1, 2007	January 2, 2011	
Dan Fabian	Rep.	Roseau	Kittson, Marshall, Pennington, Roseau	January 3, 2011	January 3, 2021	
John Burkel	Rep.	Badger	Kittson, Marshall, Pennington, Roseau	January 4, 2021	Current	
