= Arthur Michael Braun =

American politician (1910–1989)

Member of the Minnesota House of Representatives from the 1A district
- In office January 1, 1973 – December 31, 1978
- Preceded by: Neil Sherman Haugerud
- Succeeded by: Myron E. Nysether

Personal details
- Born: July 18, 1910 Belgrade, Minnesota, U.S.
- Died: January 7, 1989 (aged 78) Minneapolis, Minnesota, U.S.
- Party: Democratic (DFL)
- Spouse: Frances Kukowski (m. 1937)
- Children: 3
- Profession: Politician, businessman

Arthur Michael Braun (July 18, 1910 – January 7, 1989) was an American politician and businessman.

Braun was born in Belgrade, Minnesota and went to schools in Badger, Minnesota. He lived in Greenbush, Minnesota with his wife and family and owned a garage in Greenbush. Braun was involved with the Greenbush Fire Department and served as mayor of Greenbush, Minnesota. Braun served in the Minnesota House of Representatives from 1973 to 1978 and was a Democrat. He died at the Abbott Northwestern Hospital in Minneapolis, Minnesota.
