= Lew Larson =

American farmer and politician (1911–1977)

- 1963 portrait of Larson

Member of the Minnesota Senate
- In office January 5, 1959 – January 2, 1977
- Preceded by: John A. Johnson
- Succeeded by: Jerome O. Gunderson
- Constituency: 1st district (1959–1972); 35th district (1973–1977)

Personal details
- Born: Llewellyn W. Larson; March 17, 1911 Preble Township, Minnesota, U.S.
- Died: December 27, 1977 (aged 66) La Crosse, Wisconsin
- Party: Republican
- Spouse: Gloria Spange (m. 1938)
- Children: 3
- Education: University of Minnesota (attended)
- Occupation: Farmer

Llewellyn "Lew" W. Larson (March 17, 1911 – December 27, 1977) was an American farmer and politician who served in the Minnesota Senate from 1959 until 1977.

== Early life ==
Llewellyn Larson was born March 17, 1911, in Fillmore County, Minnesota, to Oliver and Helen Larson. He attended rural schools prior to graduating from Mabel High School in Mabel, Minnesota. He attended the University of Minnesota for a time before returning to Mabel to farm.

== Career ==
Larson served as the commissioner of Fillmore County for six years prior to his election to the Minnesota Senate in 1958. Though the state legislature was nonpartisan at the time, Larson was a member of the Republican. Larson was subsequently reelected four additional times. During the time his conservative caucus controlled the Senate, Larson served as the chairman of the Senate Committee on Regulated Industries for two terms. He opted not to seek reelection in 1976 due to his age and declining health, citing an arthritic ankle that made it difficult to walk. When he retired, his district included Fillmore and Houston counties, as well as parts of Mower and Olmsted counties. He served on the committees on taxes and tax laws, labor and commerce, and local government in his final session.

== Personal life ==
Larson married Gloria Spande in Mabel in 1938. The couple had three kids: two sons and a daughter. Larson was a member of the Minnesota Farm Bureau and the Masonic lodge of Caledonia, Minnesota. He was a Lutheran.

Larson died of respiratory problems on December 27, 1977, at Lutheran Hospital in La Crosse, Wisconsin. He had these issues for about a year prior to his death. He was buried in the cemetery of the Scheie Lutheran Church in Mabel, of which he was a member of.

Minnesota Senate
Preceded by John A. Johnson	Member of the Minnesota Senate from the 1st district 1959–1972	Succeeded by Richard W. Fitzsimons
Preceded by Wayne Popham	Member of the Minnesota Senate from the 35th district 1973–1977	Succeeded by Jerome O. Gunderson
