= Fox, Minnesota =

Fox
- Unincorporated community
- Location within Minnesota Location within the United States
- Coordinates: 48°50′20″N 95°53′56″W
- Country: United States
- State: Minnesota
- County: Roseau County
- Township: Ross Township
- Elevation: 1,093 ft (333 m)
- Time zone: UTC-6 (Central (CST))
  - Summer (DST): UTC-5 (CDT)
- ZIP code: 56751 and 56714
- Area code: 218
- GNIS feature ID: 643856

Fox is an unincorporated community in Ross Township, Roseau County, Minnesota, United States.

The community is located west of Roseau at the junction of State Highway 11 (MN 11) and State Highway 89 (MN 89).

Highway 308 (MN 308) is also in the immediate area. Nearby places include Roseau, Badger, Pinecreek, and Ross.

Fox had a post office between 1891 and 1937. The community was named for the foxes native to the area.
