= Minnesota's 1B House of Representatives district =

American legislative district

Minnesota's 1B State House of Representatives district
Representative
| Steve Gander; R–East Grand Forks |

District 1B of Minnesota is one of 134 districts in the Minnesota House of Representatives. Located in northwest Minnesota, the district comprises all of Clay, Norman, Polk, and Red Lake counties. The district is represented by Republican Representative Steve Gander since January 2025.

District 1B is located within Minnesota's 1st Senate district, alongside district 1A.

== List of past representatives ==
| Member | Party | Residence | Counties represented | Term start | Term end | Ref. |
|---|---|---|---|---|---|---|
District created
| Lloyd L. Duxbury | NP. Con. | Caledonia | Houston, Winona | January 2, 1967 | January 3, 1971 | |
| Leonard C. Myrah | NP. Con. | Spring Grove | Houston, Winona | January 4, 1971 | December 31, 1972 | |
| Andrew O. Skaar | NP. Con. | Thief River Falls | Marshall, Pennington, Polk, Red Lake | January 1, 1973 | January 5, 1975 | |
| John R. Corbid | DFL | Oklee | Marshall, Pennington, Polk, Red Lake | January 6, 1975 | January 4, 1981 | |
| LeRoy Stumpf | DFL | Plummer | Marshall, Pennington, Polk, Red Lake | January 5, 1981 | January 2, 1983 | |
| Wallace A. Sparby | DFL | Thief River Falls | Marshall, Pennington, Red Lake | January 3, 1983 | January 3, 1993 | |
| Wallace A. Sparby | DFL | Thief River Falls | Marshall, Pennington, Polk, Red Lake | January 4, 1993 | May 18, 1993 | |
| --Vacant-- | | | Marshall, Pennington, Polk, Red Lake | May 18, 1993 | July 22, 1993 | |
| Tim Finseth | Ind. Rep. | Angus | Marshall, Pennington, Polk, Red Lake | July 22, 1993 | January 4, 1997 | |
| Tim Finseth | Rep. | Angus | Marshall, Pennington, Polk, Red Lake | January 5, 1997 | January 5, 2003 | |
| Bernard Lieder | DFL | Crookston | Marshall, Pennington, Polk, Red Lake | January 6, 2003 | January 2, 2011 | |
| Deb Kiel | Rep. | Crookston | Marshall, Pennington, Polk, Red Lake | January 3, 2011 | January 6, 2013 | |
| Deb Kiel | Rep. | Crookston | Pennington, Polk, Red Lake | January 7, 2013 | January 1, 2023 | |
| Deb Kiel | Rep. | Crookston | Clay, Norman, Polk, Red Lake | January 2, 2023 | January 5, 2025 | |
| Steve Gander | Rep. | East Grand Forks | Clay, Norman, Polk, Red Lake | January 6, 2025 | Current | |
