= Ross, Minnesota =

Ross
- Unincorporated community
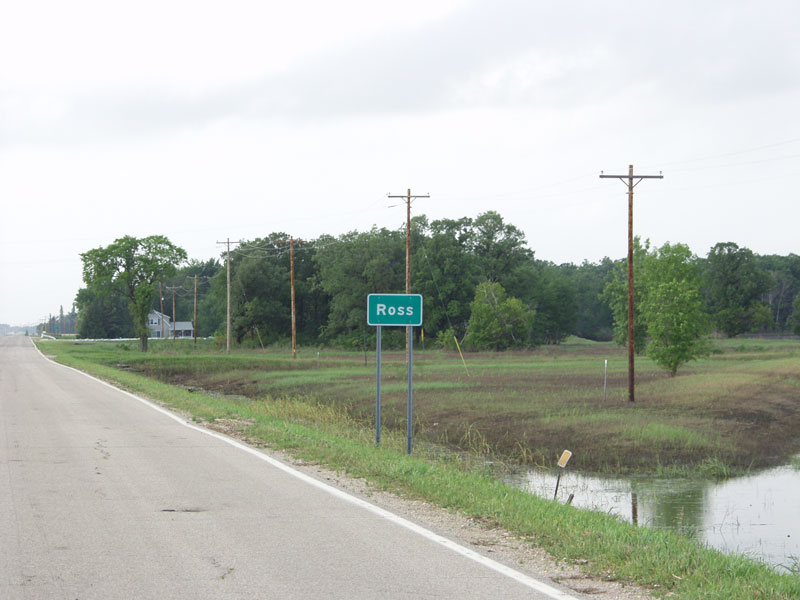
- Signpost for Ross

- Location within Minnesota Location within the United States
- Coordinates: 48°54′22″N 95°55′13″W
- Country: United States
- State: Minnesota
- County: Roseau County
- Township: Dieter Township
- Elevation: 1,033 ft (315 m)
- Time zone: UTC-6 (Central (CST))
  - Summer (DST): UTC-5 (CDT)
- ZIP code: 56751 and 56714
- Area code: 218
- GNIS feature ID: 650308

Ross is an unincorporated community in Dieter Township, Roseau County, Minnesota, United States.

The community is located northwest of Roseau near the junction of State Highway 89 (MN 89) and Roseau County Road 10 (350th Street).

Nearby places include Roseau, Badger, Pinecreek, Fox, and Ross Township. The Roseau River flows through the community.
