= John Burkel =

American politician from Minnesota

Member of the Minnesota House of Representatives from the 1A district
- Incumbent
- Assumed office January 5, 2021
- Preceded by: Dan Fabian

Personal details
- Born: April 6, 1967 (age 59)
- Party: Republican
- Spouse: Joni
- Children: 5
- Education: North Dakota State University
- Occupation: Farmer
- Website: Government website Campaign website

John Burkel (born April 6, 1967) is an American politician serving in the Minnesota House of Representatives since 2021. A member of the Republican Party of Minnesota, Burkel represents District 1A in northwest Minnesota, which includes the city of Thief River Falls and parts of Kittson, Roseau, Marshall, and Pennington Counties.

== Early life, education, and career ==
Burkel grew up in Greenbush, Minnesota, and attended Greenbush High School. He is a fourth-generation farmer. He attended North Dakota State University for two years to pursue a degree in business and economics but dropped out to work at his family's turkey farm.

President Obama pardons Popcorn the turkey in 2013

President Barack Obama pardoned Popcorn, a turkey belonging to Burkel, in the 2013 National Thanksgiving Turkey Presentation. Burkel was vice chair of the National Turkey Federation. During a 2015 outbreak of avian flu, he testified to the Minnesota Legislature about the flu's impact on turkey farmers.

== Minnesota House of Representatives ==
Burkel was elected to the Minnesota House of Representatives in 2020 and was reelected in 2022. He first ran after five-term incumbent Dan Fabian announced he would not seek reelection and encouraged Burkel to run.

Burkel serves on the Agriculture Finance and Policy and Environment and Natural Resources Finance and Policy Committees and the Property Taxes Division of the Taxes Committee.

In 2022 after an outbreak of avian flu, Burkel spoke in support of passing emergency funding. In response to legislation to limit the movement of farmed deer to prevent the spread of chronic wasting disease, he advocated that the state compensate farmers for their financial losses. Burkel has argued that the government's support of ethanol has harmed livestock farmers who use corn for feed.

Burkel and Representative Deb Kiel introduced bills increasing vocational education for high school students. He also introduced legislation to reform county engineer residency laws so rural counties could find one easier. Burkel opposed mask mandates during the COVID-19 pandemic.

== Electoral history ==
2020 Republican Primary for Minnesota State House - District 1A
Party	Candidate	Votes	%
Republican	John Burkel	3,167	90.85
Republican	David Lion	193	5.65
Republican	Brian Meehan	126	3.61
Total votes		3,486	100.0

2020 Minnesota State House - District 1A
Party	Candidate	Votes	%
Republican	John Burkel	15,169	72.75
Democratic (DFL)	Connie Lindstrom	5,670	27.19
Write-in		13	0.06
Total votes		20,852	100.0
Republican hold			

2022 Minnesota State House - District 1A
Party	Candidate	Votes	%
Republican	John Burkel (incumbent)	13,575	76.20
Democratic (DFL)	James Sceville	4,229	23.74
Write-in		10	0.06
Total votes		17,814	100.0
Republican hold			

2024 Minnesota State House - District 1A
Party	Candidate	Votes	%
Republican	John Burkel (incumbent)	17,420	76.07
Democratic (DFL)	James Sceville	5,466	23.87
Write-in		14	0.06
Total votes		22,900	100.0
Republican hold			

== Personal life ==
Burkel lives in Badger, Minnesota with his wife, Joni, and has five children. He is Catholic.
