= Minnesota State Highway 308 =

State highway in Minnesota, United States

Trunk Highway 308
- 320th Avenue
- MN 308 highlighted in red

Route information
- Maintained by MnDOT
- Length: 1.277 mi (2.055 km)
- Existed: 1955–present

Major junctions
- South end: MN 11 / CR 119 in Ross Township, near Fox
- North end: MN 89 in Ross Township

Location
- Country: United States
- State: Minnesota
- Counties: Roseau

Highway system
- Minnesota Trunk Highway System; Interstate; US; State; Legislative; Scenic
← MN 287	→ MN 310

Minnesota State Highway 308 (MN 308) is a short 1.277-mile-long (2.055 km) highway in northwest Minnesota, which runs from its intersection with State Highway 11 in Ross Township (near the unincorporated community of Fox); and continues northbound for 1.3 mile to its northern terminus at its intersection with State Highway 89 in Ross Township. Highway 89 continues north to the Canada–United States border.

== Route description ==
Highway 308 is the short west leg of a "Y" joining Highway 11 to Highway 89 northbound. The roadway follows 320th Avenue for 1.3 mile in Roseau County.

The route is legally defined as Route 308 in the Minnesota Statutes.

== History ==
Highway 308 was authorized c. 1955. The route follows a short part of the former alignment of State Highway 89, north of State Highway 11; until a shortcut was constructed for Highway 89, west of the city of Roseau.

The route was paved when it was marked.

== Major intersections ==
The entire route is in Ross Township, Roseau County.

mi	km	Destinations	Notes
0.000	0.000	MN 11 – Greenbush	Southern terminus
1.277	2.055	MN 89 – Roseau, Canada	Northern terminus
1.000 mi = 1.609 km; 1.000 km = 0.621 mi
