= Dave Olin =

American politician

Member of the Minnesota House of Representatives from the 1A district
- In office January 3, 2007 – January 3, 2011
- Preceded by: Maxine Penas
- Succeeded by: Dan Fabian

Personal details
- Born: 1947 (age 78–79)
- Party: Democratic Farmer Labor Party
- Spouse: Muriel
- Children: 2
- Education: Concordia College, Moorhead; University of Minnesota Law School
- Profession: Attorney, legislator

David M. Olin (born 1947) is an American politician and a former Democratic Farmer Labor Party member of the Minnesota House of Representatives who represented District 1A, which includes all of Kittson and Roseau counties, as well as portions of Marshall and Pennington counties in the northwestern part of the state. First elected in 2006, he was re-elected in 2008, but was unseated by Republican Dan Fabian in the 2010 general election.

Olin won his first term in 2006 when he defeated Republican DelRay Flom, an agricultural businessman, by a margin of 54% to 46%. Incumbent Rep. Maxine Penas, a Republican, did not seek re-election.

Olin was a member of the House Agriculture, Rural Economies and Veterans Affairs Committee, the House Civil Justice Committee, and the House Public Safety Policy and Oversight Committee. He also served on the Finance Subcommittee for the Public Safety Finance Division, and on the Public Safety Policy and Oversight Subcommittee for the Crime Victims/Criminal Records Division.

Olin was raised near Ada, and later received a Bachelor of Arts degree in political science and history from Concordia College in Moorhead and a Juris Doctor degree from the University of Minnesota Law School. Prior to be elected a state representative, he served as Pennington County Attorney for 32 years. He currently resides in Thief River Falls.

Preceded by Maxine Penas	Minnesota State Representative for District 1A; 2007 – 2011	Succeeded by Dan Fabian
