= Jim Tunheim =

American politician from Minnesota

Member of the Minnesota House of Representatives from the 1A district
- In office January 3, 1983 – December 31, 2000
- Preceded by: Myron E. Nysether
- Succeeded by: Maxine Penas

Personal details
- Born: June 6, 1941 (age 85)
- Party: Minnesota Democratic–Farmer–Labor Party
- Spouse: Diana
- Children: three
- Occupation: farmer

Jim Tunheim (born June 6, 1941) is an American politician in the state of Minnesota. He served in the Minnesota House of Representatives. He is currently the Treasurer of the Minnesota Senate District 54 DFL local party unit.
