= LeRoy Stumpf =

American politician

- Stumpf in 2015

Member of the Minnesota Senate from the 1st district
- In office January 4, 1983 – January 2, 2017
- Preceded by: Marv Hanson
- Succeeded by: Mark Johnson

Member of the Minnesota House of Representatives from the 1B district
- In office January 6, 1981 – January 3, 1983
- Preceded by: John R. Corbid
- Succeeded by: Wallace A. Sparby

Personal details
- Born: May 29, 1944 (age 82) Waverly, Minnesota, U.S.
- Party: Democratic (DFL)
- Spouse: Carol
- Children: 3
- Education: St. Paul Seminary; Syracuse University
- Occupation: farmer

LeRoy A. Stumpf (born May 29, 1944) is a Minnesota politician and former member of the Minnesota Senate. A member of the Minnesota Democratic–Farmer–Labor Party (DFL), he represented District 1, which included all or portions of Kittson, Marshall, Pennington, Polk, Red Lake and Roseau counties in the northwestern part of the state.

== Background ==
Stumpf was born in Waverly, Minnesota.

== Education ==
Stumpf graduated from Nazareth Hall High School, and then went on to receive a B.A. from the St. Paul Seminary in Saint Paul, Minnesota. He later received a M.P.A. from the Maxwell School of Citizenship and Public Affairs at Syracuse University in Syracuse, New York.

== Minnesota House of Representatives ==
Stumpf served in the Minnesota House of Representatives from 1981 to 1983, representing District 1B.

== Minnesota Senate ==
Stumpf was first elected to the Senate in 1982 and was re-elected in every subsequent election since then until he didn't seek re-election in 2016. He served as a majority whip from 1991 to 1993, and chaired the Education Committee from 1993 to 1997 and from 2009 to 2011, and the Children, Families and Learning Committee from 1997 to 2001. Stumpf announced his retirement in February 2016, saying that he would finish out the rest of the term and not run for reelection.

== Electoral history ==
Minnesota Senate 1st district election, 2012
Party	Candidate	Votes	%	±%
Democratic (DFL)	LeRoy Stumpf (incumbent)	22,298	60.59	
Republican	Steve Nordhagen	14,475	39.33	
Write-in	N/A	29	0.08	

Minnesota Senate 1st district election, 2010
Party	Candidate	Votes	%	±%
Democratic (DFL)	LeRoy Stumpf (incumbent)	15,614	58.33	−37.91pp
Republican	Russell Walker	11,132	41.58	
Write-in	N/A	24	0.09	

Minnesota Senate 1st district election, 2006
Party	Candidate	Votes	%	±%
Democratic (DFL)	LeRoy Stumpf (incumbent)	24,861	96.24	+32.31pp
Write-in	Roger Schmitz	603	2.33	

Minnesota Senate 1st district election, 2002
Party	Candidate	Votes	%	±%
Democratic (DFL)	LeRoy Stumpf (incumbent)	19,227	63.93	
Republican	Lyle Kenner	10,845	36.06	

Minnesota Senate 1st district election, 2000
Party	Candidate	Votes	%	±%
Democratic (DFL)	LeRoy Stumpf (incumbent)	17,651	60.23	
Republican	Lyle Kenner	10,500	35.83	
Independence	Jual Carlson	1,156	3.94	

== Personal life ==
Stumpf and his wife, Carol, are the owners of Two Fools Vineyard near Plummer.

Minnesota Senate
Preceded by Marv Hanson	Member of the Minnesota Senate from the 1st district 1983–2017	Succeeded by Mark Johnson
