= John A. Johnson (Minnesota politician) =

American politician

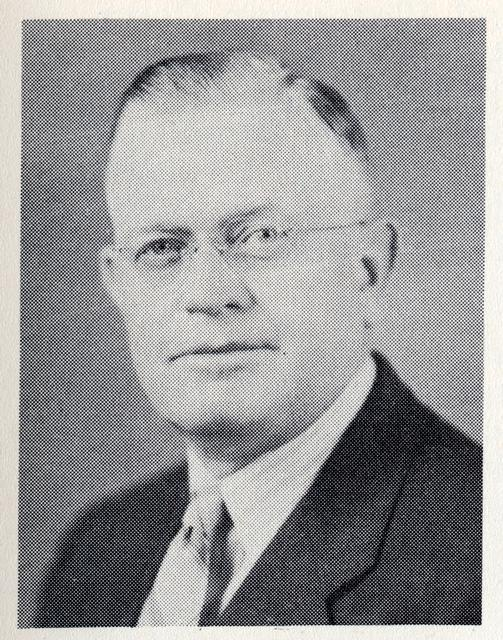

Member of the Minnesota Senate from the 1st district
- In office January 4, 1949 – January 4, 1959
- Preceded by: Henry A. Larson
- Succeeded by: Llewellyn W. Larson

35th Speaker of the Minnesota House of Representatives
- In office January 6, 1925 – January 4, 1931
- Preceded by: William I. Nolan
- Succeeded by: Oscar A. Swenson

Member of the Minnesota House of Representatives from the Fillmore district
- In office January 2, 1939 – January 2, 1949
- Preceded by: Sten Theodore Severtson
- Succeeded by: Teman Thompson
- In office January 3, 1921 – January 4, 1931
- Preceded by: Charles W. Hale
- Succeeded by: Martin W. Williams

Personal details
- Born: July 9, 1883 Litchfield, Minnesota, U.S.
- Died: February 3, 1962 (aged 78)
- Education: Stevens County Common Schools
- Profession: Hardware Store Owner

John A. Johnson (July 9, 1883 in Litchfield, Minnesota – February 3, 1962) was a Minnesota politician and a Speaker of the Minnesota House of Representatives. He served three decades in the Minnesota legislature, 20 of those years in the Minnesota House.

Johnson was a hardware store owner in Preston, Minnesota, when he was first elected to the Minnesota House of Representatives in 1920. He caucused with the Conservative caucus in the then-nonpartisan legislature. In 1925, he was elected Speaker of the House, a position he held until he left the legislature in 1931.

Johnson served as postmaster of the house during his time out of office, and returned to the legislature as a representative in 1939, serving ten years, most of that as chair of the Municipal Affairs committee. In 1949, he moved to the Minnesota Senate after winning a special election. He retired from the legislature in 1959.

Minnesota Senate
Preceded by Henry A. Larson	Member of the Minnesota Senate from the 1st district 1949–1959	Succeeded by Lew Larson
Political offices
Preceded by William I. Nolan	Speaker of the Minnesota House of Representatives; 1925–1931	Succeeded by Oscar A. Swenson
