= Pilot Mound =

Pilot Mound can refer to:

- Pilot Mound, Manitoba, Canada
- Pilot Mound, Iowa, United States
- Pilot Mound Township, Minnesota, United States
