= Tim Finseth =

American politician

Member of the Minnesota House of Representatives from the 1B district
- In office July 22, 1993 – January 5, 2003
- Preceded by: Wallace A. Sparby
- Succeeded by: Bernard Lieder

Personal details
- Born: January 7, 1964 (age 62) Polk County, Minnesota, U.S.
- Party: Republican
- Spouse: Ruth
- Children: one
- Education: Moorhead State University, Northland Community College

Timmy Lourie Finseth (born January 7, 1964) is an American politician in the state of Minnesota. He served in the Minnesota House of Representatives.
