= Andrew O. Skaar =

American politician (1922–2018)

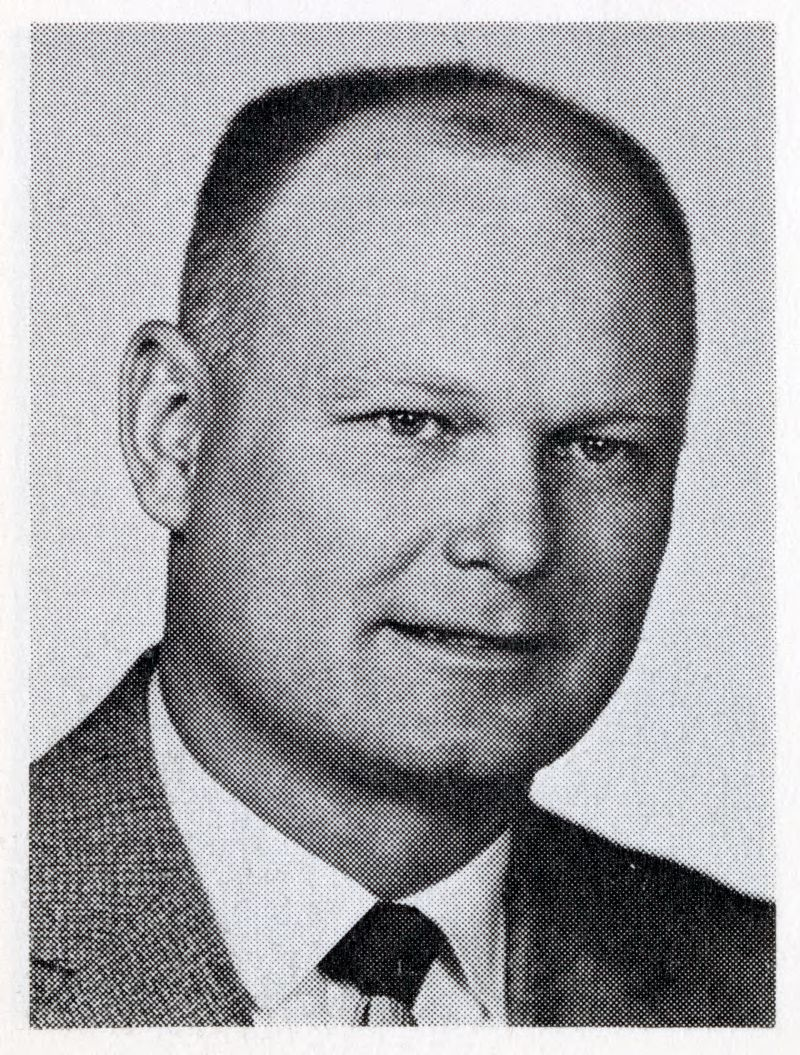

Member of the Minnesota House of Representatives
- In office January 2, 1967 – January 5, 1975
- Preceded by: District established
- Succeeded by: John R. Corbid
- Constituency: District 67B (1967–1972); District 1B (1973–1975)
- In office January 7, 1963 – January 1, 1967
- Preceded by: Harveydale Maruska
- Succeeded by: District abolished
- Constituency: 66th district

Personal details
- Born: January 3, 1922 Thief River Falls, Minnesota, U.S.
- Died: September 26, 2018 (aged 96) Thief River Falls, Minnesota, U.S.
- Party: Conservative
- Occupation: livestock/grain farmer

Andrew Ordeen "Andy" Skaar (January 3, 1922 – September 26, 2018) was an American politician in the state of Minnesota. He was born in Thief River Falls, Minnesota. He was an alumnus of the Northwest School of Agriculture, in Crookston, Minnesota, and was a grain and livestock farmer. He served in the House of Representatives for the 66th District from 1963 to 1966, for District 67B from 1967 to 1972, and for District 1B from 1973 to 1974. He lived in Thief River Falls, Minnesota and died at the Thief River Care Center in Thief River Falls.
