= Senator Gunderson =

Senator Gunderson may refer to:

- Carl Gunderson (1864–1933), South Dakota State Senate
- Jerome O. Gunderson (1923–2016), Minnesota State Senate
