= Southard, Missouri =

Unincorporated community in Missouri, U.S.

Coordinates: 37°32′21″N 92°20′16″W

Southard is an unincorporated community in southern Laclede County, in the U.S. state of Missouri. The community is on a county road two miles south of Nebo and 3.5 miles northwest of Lynchburg. The Pine Creek tributary to the Gasconade River flows past the south side of the community.

== History ==
A post office called Southard was established in 1906, and remained in operation until 1939. Family name was given after early "outlaws" scrambled to Texas.

== Notable person ==
- Julia Southard Lee, a textile researcher, was born at Southard in 1897.
