= Dan Fabian =

American politician from Minnesota

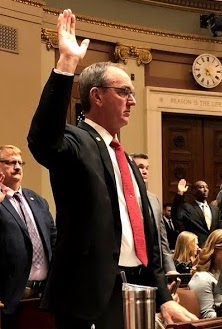

Minority Whip of the Minnesota House of Representatives
- In office January 8, 2019 – January 6, 2021
- Preceded by: Tim Sanders
- Succeeded by: Barb Haley

Majority Whip of the Minnesota House of Representatives
- In office January 6, 2015 – January 7, 2019
- Preceded by: John Persell
- Succeeded by: Liz Olson

Member of the Minnesota House of Representatives from the 1A district
- In office January 4, 2011 – January 6, 2021
- Preceded by: Dave Olin
- Succeeded by: John Burkel

Personal details
- Born: June 28, 1954 (age 72) Fargo, North Dakota, U.S.
- Party: Republican
- Spouse: Roxanne
- Children: 3
- Education: Concordia College; North Dakota State University
- Occupation: educator, claims adjuster, legislator

Dan Fabian (born June 28, 1954) is an American politician who served as a Republican member of the Minnesota House of Representatives for District 1A from 2015 to 2019 and as Minority Whip from 2019 to 2021. He represented all of Kittson, Roseau, and Marshall Counties, as well as portions of Pennington County in the northwestern part of Minnesota.

== Education and career ==
In 1972, Fabian graduated from Fargo South High School in Fargo, North Dakota. In 1976, he graduated from Concordia College in Moorhead, receiving a B.A. in Biology, Health, and Physical Education. In 1989, Fabian earned his M.A in Education and Physical Education from North Dakota State University in Fargo. He has been at teacher at Roseau High School in Roseau since 1976. Fabian is the track and cross country coach as well. He is also a crop hail insurance claims adjuster. Active in his community, he is a member of the Roseau Lions Club, secretary of the Roseau Youth Hockey Association, a member of the Northland Range and Gun Club, a volunteer youth coach, a member of his church council, and a member of the National Rifle Association of America. He is also a board member of the Minnesota State High School League Region 8A Committee.

== Minnesota House of Representatives ==
=== Elections ===
Fabian was first elected to the House in 2010 and re-elected in 2012, 2014, 2016 and 2018. He did not run for re-election in 2020 and was succeeded by John Burkel. In 2021, Fabian was elected the mayor of Roseau, Minnesota.

2018 Minnesota State Representative- House 1A
Party	Candidate	Votes	%	±%
Democratic (DFL)	Stephen R. Moeller	4768	28.84	
Republican	Dan Fabian (Incumbent)	11762	71.14	

2016 Minnesota State Representative- House 1A
Party	Candidate	Votes	%	±%
Democratic (DFL)	George Nyakasi Bass	4982	25.66	
Republican	Dan Fabian (Incumbent)	14417	74.24	

2014 Minnesota State Representative- House 1A
Party	Candidate	Votes	%	±%
Democratic (DFL)	Bruce Patterson	4864	32.82	−6.96
Republican	Dan Fabian (Incumbent)	9942	67.09	+6.92

2012 Minnesota State Representative- House 1A
Party	Candidate	Votes	%	±%
Democratic (DFL)	Bruce Patterson	7370	39.78	
Republican	Dan Fabian (Incumbent)	11146	60.17	+1.52

2010 Minnesota State Representative- House 1A
Party	Candidate	Votes	%	±%
Democratic (DFL)	Dave Olin (Incumbent)	5707	41.22	
Republican	Dan Fabian	8119	58.65	

=== Committee assignments ===
For the 89th Legislative Session, Fabian is a part of the:

- Agriculture Finance Committee
- Job Growth and Energy Affordability Policy and Finance Committee
- Vice-chair of the Environment and Natural Resources Policy and Finance Committee.

For the 88th Legislative Session, Fabian was a part of the:

- Environment and Natural Resources Policy Committee
- Environment, Natural Resources and Agriculture Finance Committee
- Jobs and Economic Development Finance and Policy Committee

For the 87th Legislative Session, Fabian was a part of the:

- Capital Investment Committee
- Education Finance Committee
- Environment, Energy and Natural Resources Policy and Finance Committee
- Redistricting Committee

=== Tenure ===
Fabian was sworn in on January 4, 2011. On January 6, 2015, he became the Majority Whip.

== Personal life ==
Fabian is married to his wife Roxanne. They have 3 adult sons: Mark, Erik, and Jason. They also have 7 grandchildren.

Minnesota House of Representatives
Preceded by Dave Olin	State Representative - District 1A; 2011 - 2021	Succeeded by John Burkel
