= Francis Martin Kelly =

American prelate

His Excellency, The Most Reverend Francis Martin Kelly
- Bishop of Winona; Titular Bishop of Mylasa
- Church: Roman Catholic Church
- See: Diocese of Winona
- Predecessor: Patrick Richard Heffron
- Successor: Edward Aloysius Fitzgerald
- Other post: Titular Bishop of Mylasa

Orders
- Ordination: November 1, 1912 by Giuseppe Ceppetelli
- Consecration: June 9, 1926 by Patrick Richard Heffron

Personal details
- Born: November 15, 1886 Houston, Minnesota, US
- Died: June 24, 1950 (aged 63) Rochester, Minnesota, US
- Education: Catholic University of America; Propaganda University
- Motto: Viam veritatis elegi (I have chosen the way of truth)

Francis Martin Kelly (November 15, 1886 – June 24, 1950) was an American prelate of the Roman Catholic Church. He served as bishop of the Diocese of Winona in Minnesota from 1928 to 1949.

== Early life ==
Francis Kelly was born on November 15, 1886, in Houston, Minnesota, to James and Ellen Kelly. His father sat in the Minnesota Legislature. After attending the College of St. Thomas in St. Paul, he earned a Bachelor of Philosophy degree from the Catholic University of America in Washington, D.C. (1909) and a Doctor of Sacred Theology degree from the Propaganda University in Rome (1913).

== Priesthood ==
Kelly was ordained to the priesthood in Rome for the Diocese of Winona by Patriarch Giuseppe Ceppetelli on November 1, 1912.He became secretary to Bishop Patrick Richard Heffron in 1914, and taught philosophy at Saint Mary's College in Winona and the College of Saint Teresa in Winona between 1915 and 1926. Kelly served chancellor of the diocese from 1919 to 1926 and as vice-rector of St. Mary's from 1918 to 1926.

== Auxiliary Bishop and Bishop of Winona ==
On March 22, 1926, Kelly was appointed auxiliary bishop of Winona and titular bishop of Mylasa by Pope Pius XI. He was consecrated at Saint Mary's College by Archbishop Patrick Richard Heffron on June 9, 1926. On February 10, 1928, Pius XI appointed Kelly as bishop of Winona diocese.

In 1941, Kelly suffered a stroke, and had to re-learn how to celebrate mass. In 1942, he suffered a second stroke, which permanently incapacitated him. He spent his final seven years as bishop at Saint Marys Hospital in Rochester, Minnesota.Kelly retired as bishop of Winona on October 17, 1949. Francis Kelly died in Rochester, Minnesota, on June 24, 1950.

Catholic Church titles
Preceded by Patrick Richard Heffron	Bishop of Winona; 1928–1949	Succeeded by Edward Aloysius Fitzgerald
