= Pine Creek, Northern Territory (disambiguation) =

Pine Creek, Northern Territory is a town and locality in the Northern Territory of Australia.

Pine Creek may also refer to:

- Pine Creek bioregion, an interim Australian bioregion
- Pine Creek Airfield, a disused airfield
- Pine Creek railway station, a former railway station and museum

== See also ==
- Pine Creek (disambiguation)
