= Clifford W. Bouvette =

American politician (1897–1972)

Member of the Minnesota House of Representatives from the 67th district
- In office January 5, 1937 – January 2, 1939

Personal details
- Born: September 15, 1897 Hallock, Minnesota, U.S.
- Died: April 5, 1972 (aged 74)
- Spouse: Marjory Lucile Milbery (m. 1923)
- Children: 2
- Occupation: Politician, newspaper editor

Clifford W. Bouvette (September 15, 1897 – April 5, 1972) was an American newspaper editor and politician.

Bouvette was born in Hallock, Kittson County, Minnesota. He went to the Hallock public schools and studied law in Grand Forks, North Dakota for two years. Bouvette was the editor and owner of the Kittson County Enterprise weekly newspaper. Bouvette served in the Minnesota House of Representatives in 1937 and 1938.
