= Marv Hanson =

American farmer and politician

1981 portrait of Hanson

Marvin B. "Marv" Hanson (December 12, 1943 – February 29, 2004) was a farmer and politician.

From Hallock, Minnesota, Hanson received his bachelor's degree from the University of Minnesota and his law degree from Columbia Law School. He had served in the United States Peace Corps. Hanson served in the Minnesota Senate as a Democrat for Minnesota's 1st Senate district from 1977 to 1982. Hanson attended Red River Lutheran Church near Hallock. He died from a heart attack at his home in Kennedy, Minnesota.

== Notes ==
Minnesota Senate
Preceded by Richard W. Fitzsimons	Member of the Minnesota Senate from the 1st district 1977–1983	Succeeded by LeRoy Stumpf
