= T. E. Sorenson =

Norwegian-American politician (1853–1929)

- 1924 portrait of Sorenson

Member of the Minnesota Senate from the 1st district
- In office January 1, 1923 – January 2, 1927
- Preceded by: John W. Hopp
- Succeeded by: Henry A. Larson

Personal details
- Born: Theodore E. Sorenson; October 12, 1853 Gjerpen, Telemark, Norway
- Died: May 7, 1929 (aged 75) Faribault, Minnesota, U.S.
- Children: 2
- Occupation: Farmer

Theodore E. Sorenson (October 12, 1853 – May 7, 1929) was a Norwegian-American politician who served in the Minnesota Senate representing the 1st district for one term from 1923 to 1927. He also served in various offices for Pilot Mound Township, Minnesota, and as a county commissioner of Fillmore County, Minnesota.

== Early life ==
Theodore E. Sorenson was born on October 12, 1853, in Gjerpen Municipality, Telemark, Norway. In 1868, Sorenson's family moved to Pilot Mound Township, Fillmore County, Minnesota, and homesteaded there.

== Career ==
Sorenson lived on the same homestead up until the months before his death, serving in various political positions for the township. He also served as the county auditor for Fillmore County, Minnesota, from 1893 to 1900, and was a member of the county board of commissioners from 1901 to 1905.

He was a Republican and was a delegate to the 1908 state party convention. Later in his career, he was described as a member of the Farmer–Labor Party in the La Crosse Tribune.

=== Minnesota Senate ===
On April 27, 1922, Sorenson filed to run for Minnesota Senate as a representative of the 1st district, which was made up of Fillmore and Houston counties, and at the time represented by John W. Hopp. No other candidate besides Hopp and Sorenson declared, meaning that the two automatically advanced to the general election. He defeated Hopp during the 1922 election, anchored largely by a strong performance in Fillmore County. Official election returns showed the Sorenson received 6,324 votes, or 54.34% share. Prior to taking office, the Minnesota Leader classified Sorenson as a progressive.

During the first half of his term in the Senate, Sorenson voted in favor of a bill that would reinstate capital punishment in the state and introduced legislation which would have forced prisoners to serve at least half of their sentence before being paroled and at least three-quarters of their sentence before being pardoned. Sorenson was a member of the standing committees on civil administration, insurance, markets and marketing, memorial parks and monuments, public highways, taxes and tax laws, and towns, counties, and municipalities.

For the second half of his term, he was appointed to the committees on agriculture, insurance, labor, markets and marketing, memorial parks and monuments, public highways, taxes and tax laws, and towns and counties. During this half, Sorenson introduced a bill that would have prohibited discrimination between towns in the purchase of agricultural products and a bill that would have reduced the amount that may be loaned on a farm under the rural credits act. A state fish hatchery in Lanesboro was established following legislation introduced by Sorenson.

The Minneapolis Journal forecasted that the 1926 election in the first district would be competitive early in the year. Despite rumors of additional candidates, only former district court clerk Henry A. Larson announced his candidacy in late January. Larson defeated Sorenson in his bid for reelection on November 2, 1926. Sorenson recorded 5,240 votes, or a 41.01% share, more than 2,000 votes behind Larson.

== Personal life ==
Sorenson was married, and had a son and daughter. His wife died in 1918. Sorenson died on May 7, 1929, after suffering a weekslong illness. He had been visiting his daughter in Wanamingo, Minnesota, when he was struck with the illness. He was taken to a hospital in Faribault, Minnesota, where he died at the age of 75.

Minnesota Senate
Preceded by John W. Hopp	Member of the Minnesota Senate from the 1st district 1923–1927	Succeeded by Henry A. Larson
