= Henry A. Larson =

American lawyer and politician (1877–1948)

- 1945 portrait of Larson

Member of the Minnesota Senate from the 1st district
- In office January 3, 1927 – March 12, 1948
- Preceded by: T. E. Sorenson
- Succeeded by: John A. Johnson

Personal details
- Born: Henry Albert Larson; June 27, 1877 Preston Township, Minnesota, U.S.
- Died: March 12, 1948 (aged 70) Tulsa, Oklahoma, U.S.
- Spouse: Frances Broderick (m. 1906)
- Education: Northern Indiana Normal School (attended); University of Minnesota (attended)
- Occupation: Lawyer, educator

Henry Albert Larson (June 27, 1877 – March 12, 1948) was an American lawyer and politician who served in the Minnesota Senate for over 21 years. A resident of Preston, Minnesota, he represented Minnesota's 1st Senate district from 1927 until his death in 1948. He also practiced law in the Preston area.

== Early life ==
Henry Albert Larson was born on June 27, 1877, in Fillmore County, Minnesota. He graduated from the University of Minnesota in 1901 and was admitted to the bar in 1915.

== Career ==
Larson served as the clerk of court for Fillmore County from 1903 to 1916, when resigned to enter private law practice with John W. Hopp, establishing the firm Hopp and Larson.

Larson was elected to the Minnesota Senate on November 2, 1926, after defeating incumbent senator T. E. Sorenson in that year's election. Larson proceeded to serve as a senator for over 21 years. From 1939 to 1941, as the conservative caucus of the Senate had control of the legislative body, he was the president pro tempore of the Senate. At the time of his death, Larson served as the chairman of the Senate Committee on Banks and Banking, as well as the president of the Farmers and Merchants bank of Preston, Minnesota. Though the legislature was officially nonpartisan, Larson was involved with the Republican Party.

== Personal life ==
Larson was a member of the Minnesota State Bar Association and his local Masonic lodge. He died on March 12, 1948, in Tulsa, Oklahoma, following a stroke while visiting his niece. He was 70 years old and was survived by his wife, Francis. Larson was buried in Preston.

Minnesota Senate
Preceded by T. E. Sorenson	Member of the Minnesota Senate from the 1st district 1927–1948	Succeeded by John A. Johnson
