= James C. Kelly =

American farmer and politician (1857–1947)

Member of the Minnesota Senate from the 1st district
- In office January 6, 1891 – January 7, 1895

Member of the Minnesota House of Representatives from the 1st district
- In office January 8, 1889 – January 5, 1891

Personal details
- Born: October 28, 1857 Chatfield, Minnesota, U.S.
- Died: June 9, 1947 (aged 89) Houston, Minnesota, U.S.
- Party: Democratic
- Spouse: Ellen J.
- Children: 5, including Francis Martin Kelly
- Education: College of Saint Benedict and Saint John's University
- Profession: Politician, farmer

James C. Kelly (October 28, 1857 – June 9, 1947) was an American farmer and politician.

Kelly was born in Chatfield, Fillmore County, Minnesota. He went to the public schools in Yucatan Township, Houston County, Minnesota and to the College of Saint Benedict and Saint John's University for business courses, for two years, in Collegeville, Minnesota. Kelly served as mayor and clerk of Houston, Minnesota and on the Houston City Council. He also served on the Yucatan Township Board of Education. Kelly had lived in Yucatan, Minnesota with his wife and five children. One of his children Francis Martin Kelly served as the Roman Catholic bishop of the Roman Catholic Diocese of Winona. Kelly served in the Minnesota House of Representatives in 1889 and 1890 and in the Minnesota Senate from 1891 to 1894. He was a Democrat. Kelly died in Houston, Minnesota.
