= John W. Hopp =

American attorney and politician (1868–1931)

- 1919 portrait of Hopp

Member of the Minnesota Senate from the 1st district
- In office January 6, 1919 – December 31, 1922
- Preceded by: Francis A. Duxbury
- Succeeded by: T. E. Sorenson
Committee positions
Chair of the Senate Standing Committee on State and County Fairs
In office January 6, 1919 – December 31, 1922
Preceded by	Committee established
Succeeded by	Charles F. Serline

Personal details
- Born: January 13, 1868 Preston, Minnesota, U.S.
- Died: May 31, 1931 (aged 63) La Crosse, Wisconsin, U.S.
- Party: Republican
- Other political affiliations: Nonpartisan (1919–1922) (Note: During Hopp's time in the Senate, the Minnesota Legislature was officially nonpartisan.)
- Spouse: Alice E. Daniels (m. 1897)
- Children: 2
- Education: University of Minnesota (LLB)
- Occupation: Lawyer

John W. Hopp (January 13, 1868 – May 31, 1931) was an American lawyer and politician who served in the Minnesota Senate for one term from 1919 to 1922. A graduate of the University of Minnesota, Hopp entered private law practice immediately after his graduation in 1891 in his native Preston, Minnesota, becoming the county attorney of Fillmore County, Minnesota, from 1897 to 1902 and again from 1909 to 1913. As a member of the Republican Party, Hopp was also a regular delegate to district and state party conventions.

Hopp was elected to the Minnesota Senate in 1918 and served from 1919 to 1922 after losing reelection to T. E. Sorenson. As a senator, Hopp advocated for increased taxation on mine royalties and increased government support for veterans of World War I. He served as the chairman for the Senate Standing Committee on State and County Fairs during his term in office. Following his defeat, Hopp remained active in state politics and was a delegate to the 1928 Republican National Convention.

== Early life ==
John W. Hopp was born in Preston, Minnesota, on January 13, 1868, to parents Michael and Eva Hopp. His father came from Germany to the United States in 1856 and lived for a time in St. Joseph, Missouri, before relocating to Preston. Hopp attended the Preston district school before attending the University of Minnesota, graduating with a Bachelor of Laws from there in 1891, immediately becoming a partner with Henry R. Wells in Preston. Upon the formation of the partnership, the Mower County Transcript described Hopp as a "promising young attorney." Hopp was also involved in the Republican Party, and was a delegate to the 1892 party district convention in Spring Valley, Minnesota, and at the 1894 congressional party convention.

== Career ==
At the Republican county convention of Fillmore County, Minnesota, in September 1896, Hopp was selected as the Republican nominee for county attorney. Hopp was elected to the position in November 1896, beginning his term on January 5, 1897, and served until January 6, 1903. Hopp was also a city councilman for Preston in 1901. In 1902, Hopp was part of a commission of Preston residents tasked with negotiating the construction of a railroad line connecting Preston to the remainder of the Southern Minnesota Railway, an initiative largely advocated for by Hopp's law partner, Wells. The commission met with Albert J. Earling, president of the Chicago, Milwaukee & St. Paul, in Chicago, and the extension was completed in November 1903.

In March 1908, the National Bank of Preston was organized, with Hopp serving as a vice president and as a director of the bank. He served a second term as county attorney from January 5, 1909, to January 7, 1913. In 1910, Hopp's partnership with Wells dissolved, and he later became the law partner of Henry A. Larson. In November 1911, Hopp was a founding stockholder of the Preston Commercial Club, a social and business organization of the community. Hopp was also involved in various World War I efforts in both Fillmore County and Preston. He was a director of the Preston branch of the American Red Cross founded in May 1917, committee chairman for a countywide YMCA drive in November 1917, and county chairman of the United War Work Campaign in November 1918. He was also part of the county legal advisory board, which reviewed wartime Selective Service System exemption requests.

In March 1918, Hopp filed to run as a candidate for Minnesota Senate to represent the state's 1st Senate district, which consisted of Fillmore and Houston counties. At the time of reporting, incumbent Francis A. Duxbury was considered not to be seeking reelection. However, Duxbury did file for reelection. A. J. Rose, a Preston farmer, was a third candidate. In the June 1918 primary election, Hopp and Duxbury advanced to the general election. In the November 1918 general election, Hopp defeated Duxbury by nearly 20 percentage points, totaling 4,153 votes, or 59.05% vote share. The Bemidji Pioneer characterized Hopp's win as "merely a victory of Fillmore county over Houston" due to Fillmore County's greater population at the time.

=== Minnesota Senate ===
Early in his first session, which convened on January 7, 1919, Hopp was noted to be in support of legislation for providing jobs to men returning home from World War I, and in March 1919 a bill proposed by him which opened the Minnesota Veterans Home to veterans of the war was passed by the Senate under suspension of rules. He, along with senators Oluf Gjerset and Frank L. Cliff, also proposed a bill to put a 5% tax on iron mine royalties in March, though this was struck down by the Senate by a single vote in April. On January 23, Hopp voted in favor of a resolution encouraging the United States Senate to pass the Nineteenth Amendment to the United States Constitution, granting suffrage to women, and on March 21, Hopp voted again in favor of a bill granting presidential election suffrage to Minnesota women. Hopp was a member of the Senate standing committees on banks and banking, finance, game and fish, the judiciary, and taxes and tax laws during his first session. He was also the chairman of the committee on state and county fairs. The session adjourned April 24, 1919.

Hopp kept all of his committee appointments in his second session, including his chairmanship, but was also a member of the committee on workmen's compensation. The session convened on January 4, 1921, and that month, Hopp reintroduced his bill calling for a five percent tax on iron mine royalties as well as a bill that loosened restrictions on farm loans. In February, Hopp, with Representative Ralph J. Parker, authored legislation for a royalty tax on ground rents. The next month, he introduced a bill to raise the gross earnings tax on large telephone companies, while the farm loan bill he helped introduce passed the Senate unanimously. In April, Hopp amended a road tax and unanimously passed the Senate. The version out of committee suggested a two percent tax, while Hopp's amendment raised it to two and a quarter. However, the figure was dropped back to two percent in a compromise with the House of Representatives. Hopp's five percent royalty tax again died in the Senate in the closing days of the legislature, though by six votes rather than one. On April 21, 1921, the Senate adjourned.

In October 1921, Hopp and his son, George, were named as defendants in a lawsuit by Cushman B. Tibbetts. Tibbetts alleged that the pair assaulted him during a speech in Fillmore County in September that year. Hopp denied the assault. In February 1922, Hopp filed for reelection to the Senate. In the November 1922 general election, Hopp's reelection bid was denied by Fillmore County farmer T. E. Sorenson. Hopp finished with 5,314 votes, or 45.66% of the total.

== Post-Senate career and death ==
Following his defeat, Hopp remained active in Republican Party politics. He was a member of a committee tasked with campaigning for J. A. O. Preus during the 1923 United States Senate special election in Minnesota, and for Ole O. Sageng during the 1924 United States Senate election in Minnesota. Following Sydney Anderson's announcement that he would not run for reelection to the United States House of Representatives in 1924, Hopp was mentioned as a possible candidate, though he did not run. In 1928, Hopp was an at-large delegate for Minnesota at the 1928 Republican National Convention. Hopp supported Frank O. Lowden. That year, he was also elected to the state party central committee. Outside of the Republican Party, Hopp was elected to the board of governors for the Minnesota State Bar Association in 1926.

Hopp died on May 31, 1931, at a hospital in La Crosse, Wisconsin, following a monthslong illness.

== Personal life ==
Hopp married Alice E. Daniels of Winona, Minnesota, in Preston in February 1897, and the two lived in Preston following the wedding. They had two children— a son, Harold D., born in 1898, and a daughter, Margaret E., born in 1911. Hopp was active in Freemasonry and was a member of the Osman Temple in Saint Paul, Minnesota.

== Notes ==
Minnesota Senate
Preceded by Francis A. Duxbury	Member of the Minnesota Senate from the 1st district 1919–1922	Succeeded by T. E. Sorenson
New office	Chair of the Senate Standing Committee on State and County Fairs; 1919–1922	Succeeded by Charles F. Serline
