= Ross Township, Roseau County, Minnesota =

Township in Minnesota, United States

Ross Township, Minnesota
- Township
- Location of Ross Township, within Roseau County, Minnesota
- Coordinates: 48°50′13″N 95°56′11″W
- Country: United States
- State: Minnesota
- County: Roseau

Area
  - Total: 35.8 sq mi (92.7 km^{2})
  - Land: 35.8 sq mi (92.7 km^{2})
  - Water: 0 sq mi (0.0 km^{2})
- Elevation: 1,050 ft (320 m)

Population (2020)
  - Total: 403
  - Density: 11.3/sq mi (4.35/km^{2})
- Time zone: UTC-6 (Central (CST))
  - Summer (DST): UTC-5 (CDT)
- ZIP code: 56751
- Area code: 218
- FIPS code: 27-55942
- GNIS feature ID: 0665473

Ross Township is a township in Roseau County, Minnesota, United States. The population was 403 at the 2020 census.

The unincorporated community of Fox is located within Ross Township. The unincorporated community of Ross is located in adjacent Dieter Township.

== Geography ==
According to the United States Census Bureau, the township has a total area of 35.8 square miles (92.7 km^{2}), all land.

== Demographics ==
As of the census of 2000, there were 454 people, 158 households, and 125 families residing in the township. The population density was 12.7 people per square mile (4.9/km^{2}). There were 161 housing units at an average density of 4.5/sq mi (1.7/km^{2}). The racial makeup of the township was 98.46% White, 0.88% African American, 0.22% from other races, and 0.44% from two or more races. Hispanic or Latino of any race were 1.32% of the population.

There were 158 households, out of which 43.0% had children under the age of 18 living with them, 69.0% were married couples living together, 6.3% had a female householder with no husband present, and 20.3% were non-families. 18.4% of all households were made up of individuals, and 7.0% had someone living alone who was 65 years of age or older. The average household size was 2.87 and the average family size was 3.25.

In the township the population was spread out, with 32.4% under the age of 18, 6.8% from 18 to 24, 30.2% from 25 to 44, 21.6% from 45 to 64, and 9.0% who were 65 years of age or older. The median age was 34 years. For every 100 females, there were 112.1 males. For every 100 females age 18 and over, there were 104.7 males.

The median income for a household in the township was $43,438, and the median income for a family was $47,083. Males had a median income of $33,500 versus $25,250 for females. The per capita income for the township was $15,746. About 3.0% of families and 3.1% of the population were below the poverty line, including none of those under age 18 and 19.6% of those age 65 or over.
