= Patrick Richard Heffron =

American prelate

His Excellency, The Right Reverend Patrick Richard Heffron
- Bishop of Winona
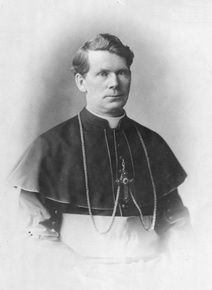
- Church: Catholic Church
- Diocese: Diocese of Winona
- Appointed: March 4, 1910
- Term ended: November 23, 1927
- Predecessor: Joseph Bernard Cotter
- Successor: Francis Martin Kelly

Orders
- Ordination: December 22, 1884 by Édouard-Charles Fabre
- Consecration: May 19, 1910 by John Ireland

Personal details
- Born: June 1, 1856 New York City, U.S.
- Died: November 23, 1927 (aged 71) Winona, Minnesota, U.S.
- Education: St. John's College; Grand Séminaire de Montréal; Santa Maria sopra Minerva College
- Motto: Tota pulchra (You are completely beautiful)

Patrick Richard Heffron (June 1, 1856 – November 23, 1927) was an American prelate of the Catholic Church. He served as the second bishop of Winona in Minnesota from 1910 until his death.

== Early life and education ==
Patrick Richard Heffron was born in New York City on June 1, 1856, to Patrick and Margaret (née O'Brien) Heffron. The family later moved to Ripon, Wisconsin, and settled in Olmsted County, Minnesota, in 1864. He received his early education at public schools in New York and Wisconsin, and attended high school in Mantorville, Minnesota. Afterwards he attended business college and law school in Rochester, Minnesota.

Deciding to enter the priesthood, Heffron began his studies under the Benedictines at St. John's College in Collegeville, Minnesota, graduating in 1878. He then continued his studies at the Grand Séminaire de Montréal in Montreal, Quebec, where he received a Doctor of Divinity degree in 1883.

== Priesthood ==
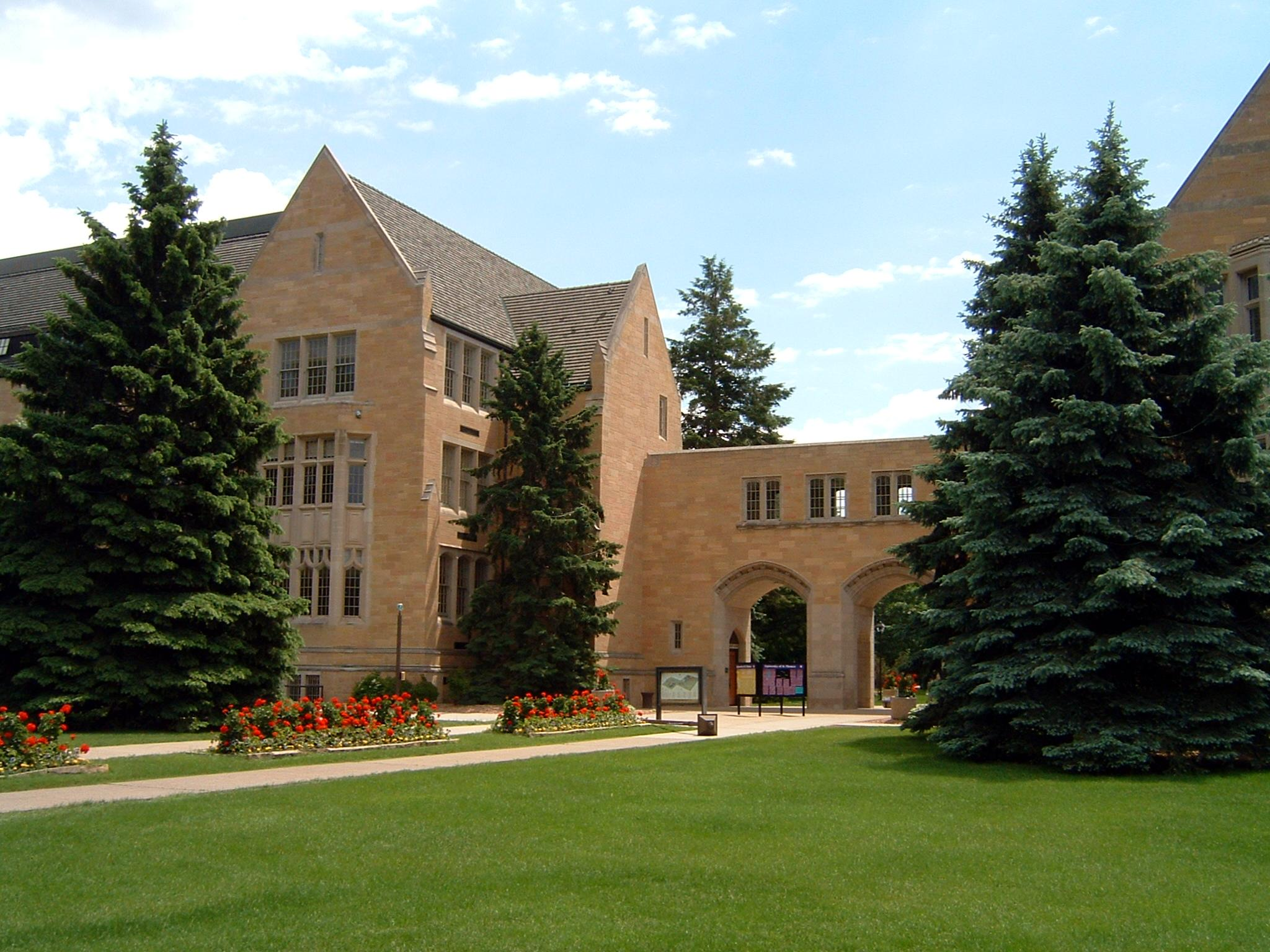
University of Saint Thomas, St. Paul, Minnesota (2005)

While in Montreal, Heffron was ordained a priest for the Diocese of Saint Paul on December 22, 1884, by Bishop Édouard-Charles Fabre. Following his ordination, the diocese assigned Heffron to teach theology at St. Thomas Seminary for two years. Archbishop John Ireland sent him in 1886 to further his studies in Rome, where he earned doctorates in theology and canon law from the college at Santa Maria sopra Minerva in 1889.

Returning from Europe, Heffron served as rector of the Cathedral of Saint Paul from 1889 to 1896. He then returned to St. Thomas Seminary, where he was appointed vice rector in 1896. In 1897, Heffron was promoted to the seminary's rector.

== Bishop of Winona ==
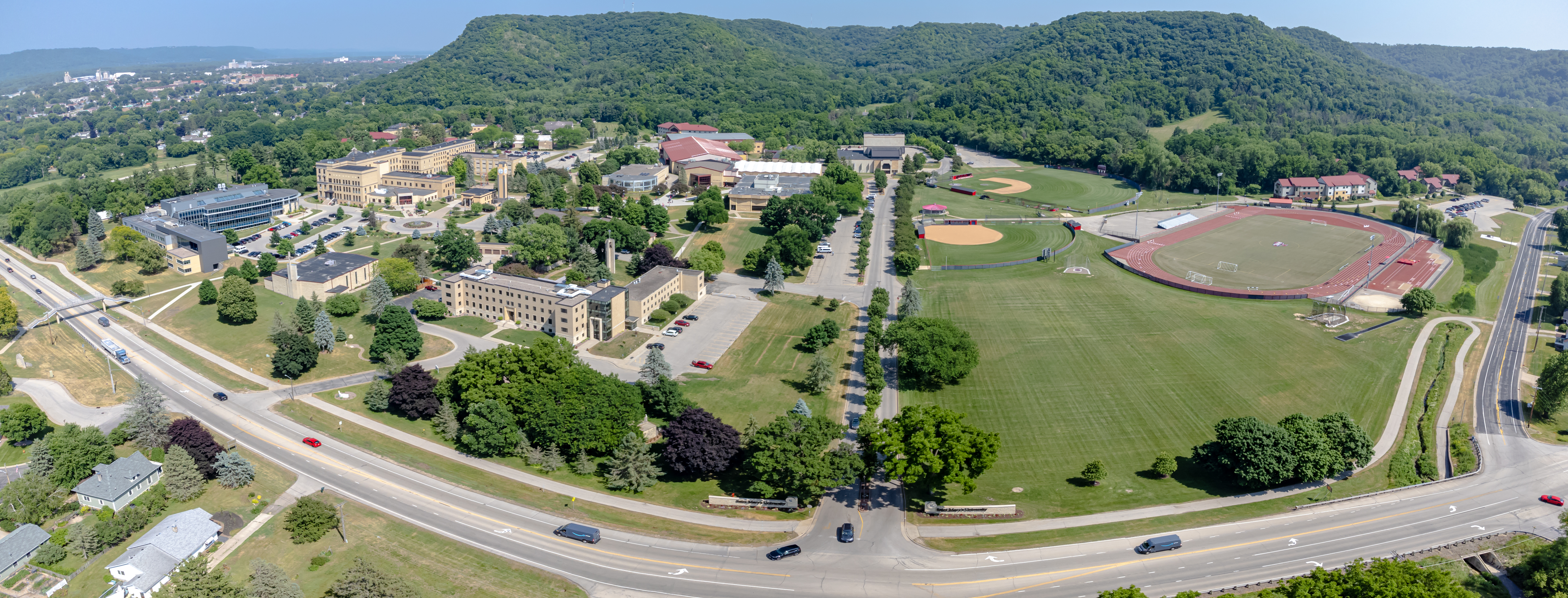
Saint Mary's University of Winona (2023)

On March 4, 1910, Heffron was appointed bishop of Winona by Pope Pius X. He received his episcopal consecration on May 19, 1910, from Archbishop Ireland, with Bishops James McGolrick and James Trobec serving as co-consecrators.

When Heffron became bishop, the diocese contained a Catholic population of over 49,000 with 91 priests, 116 churches, and 29 parochial schools with 4,700 students. By the time of his death in 1927, there was a Catholic population of nearly 69,000 with 130 priests, 125 churches, and 42 parochial schools with over 8,000 students. He opened Cotter High School in Winona in 1911 and St. Mary's College in Winona in 1912.

On August 27, 1915, Heffron was shot twice by Reverend Laurence M. Lesches, a diocesan priest, while celebrating private mass. Lesches had been angry at Heffron for denying him his own parish due to Lesches's arrogant behavior and emotional instability. Heffron survived and Lesches was committed to a mental hospital for life.

Heffron was named an assistant to the papal throne by Pope Benedict XV in November 1920.

=== Death and legacy ===
Heffron died from brain cancer in Winona on November 23, 1927.

== Episcopal succession ==
Catholic Church titles
Preceded by Joseph Bernard Cotter	Bishop of Winona; 1910–1927	Succeeded by Francis Martin Kelly
