= Richard W. Fitzsimons =

American politician (1922–1991)

1973 portrait of Fitzsimons

Richard W. Fitzsimons (January 19, 1922 – January 9, 1991) was an American farmer and politician.

Fitzsimons was born on a farm in Argyle, Marshall County, Minnesota and graduated from the Argyle High School in 1939. He lived in Argyle, Minnesota with his wife and family and was a farmer. Fitzsimons served in the Minnesota House of Representatives from 1953 to 1972 and in the Minnesota Senate representing Minnesota's 1st Senate district from 1973 to 1976. He died from a heart attack at his home in Moorhead, Minnesota.

Minnesota Senate
| Preceded by Llewellyn W. Larson | Member of the Minnesota Senate from the 1st district 1973–1977 | Succeeded by Marv Hanson |
