= Julia Southard Lee =

American textile chemist (1897–1985)

Julia Southard Lee (29 September 1897 – 4 March 1985) was an American textile chemist known for her teaching positions and research on protein fibers and textile quality.

== Early life and education ==
Lee was born in Southard, Missouri on September 29, 1897. She attended the University of Missouri for her undergraduate education and earned her Bachelor of Science degree in 1926. She then attended Kansas State University and earned her master's degree in 1929. For her doctorate, she attended the University of Chicago and graduated in 1936. While at the University of Chicago, she received a fellowship in home economics named after Ellen Swallow Richards. In 1937, she married.

== Career and research ==
While studying for her doctorate, Lee worked at Purdue University as a textiles and clothing instructor. After earning her Ph.D., Lee moved to the University of Iowa, where she stayed an associate professor until 1943. She then taught at Washington State University for five years, until 1950, and chaired the textiles and clothing department there. Her stint at Washington was followed by an appointment in the home economics department at New Mexico State University, which began in 1953. Throughout her career, she researched textile quality, X-ray studies of cellulose, and protein fibers. She wrote a book called Elementary Textiles.

== Honors and legacy ==
Lee belonged to several scientific societies, including the Chemical Society, the Association of Textile Chemists and Colorists, and the American Home Economics Association. The New Mexico State University has a Dr. Julia Southard Lee Fund for Textiles in her name.
