= Amos Henry Fikkan =

American politician (1894–1968)

Amos Henry Fikkan (October 7, 1894 – May 5, 1968) was an American politician, businessman, and pharmacist.

Fikken was born in Grant County, Minnesota and served in the United States Army during World War I. He lived in Badger, Roseau County, Minnesota with his wife and family. He was a pharmacist and businessman. Fikkan served in the Minnesota House of Representatives in 1931 and 1932. He died in Roseau County, Minnesota.
