= Hallock Municipal Airport =

Hallock Airport
- IATA: none; ICAO: KHCO; FAA LID: HCO

Summary
- Airport type: Public
- Owner: City of Hallock
- Serves: Hallock, Minnesota
- Elevation AMSL: 820.2 ft / 250 m
- Coordinates: 48°45′09.8330″N 096°56′34.8110″W
- Website: https://hallockmn.org/airport-transportation/

Map
- Location of airport in Minnesota/United States KHCO (the United States)

Runways
Direction	Length		Surface
Direction	ft	m	Surface
13/31	4,007 x 75	1,221 x 23	Asphalt

Hallock Municipal Airport (ICAO: KHCO, FAA LID: HCO) is a city-owned public-use airport located one mile south of the city of Hallock, Minnesota in Kittson County.

== Facilities and aircraft ==
Hallock Airport has one runway, designated 13/31 with a 4,007 x 75 ft (1,221 x 23 m) asphalt surface.

For the 12-month period ending June 30, 2017, the airport had 17,700 aircraft operations, an average of 48.49 per day: 73.4% general aviation and 26.6% transient general aviation. The airport housed 18 single-engine airplanes and 1 multi-engine airplane.

== See also ==
- List of airports in Minnesota
