= Pilot Mound Township, Fillmore County, Minnesota =

Pilot Mound Township, Minnesota
- Township
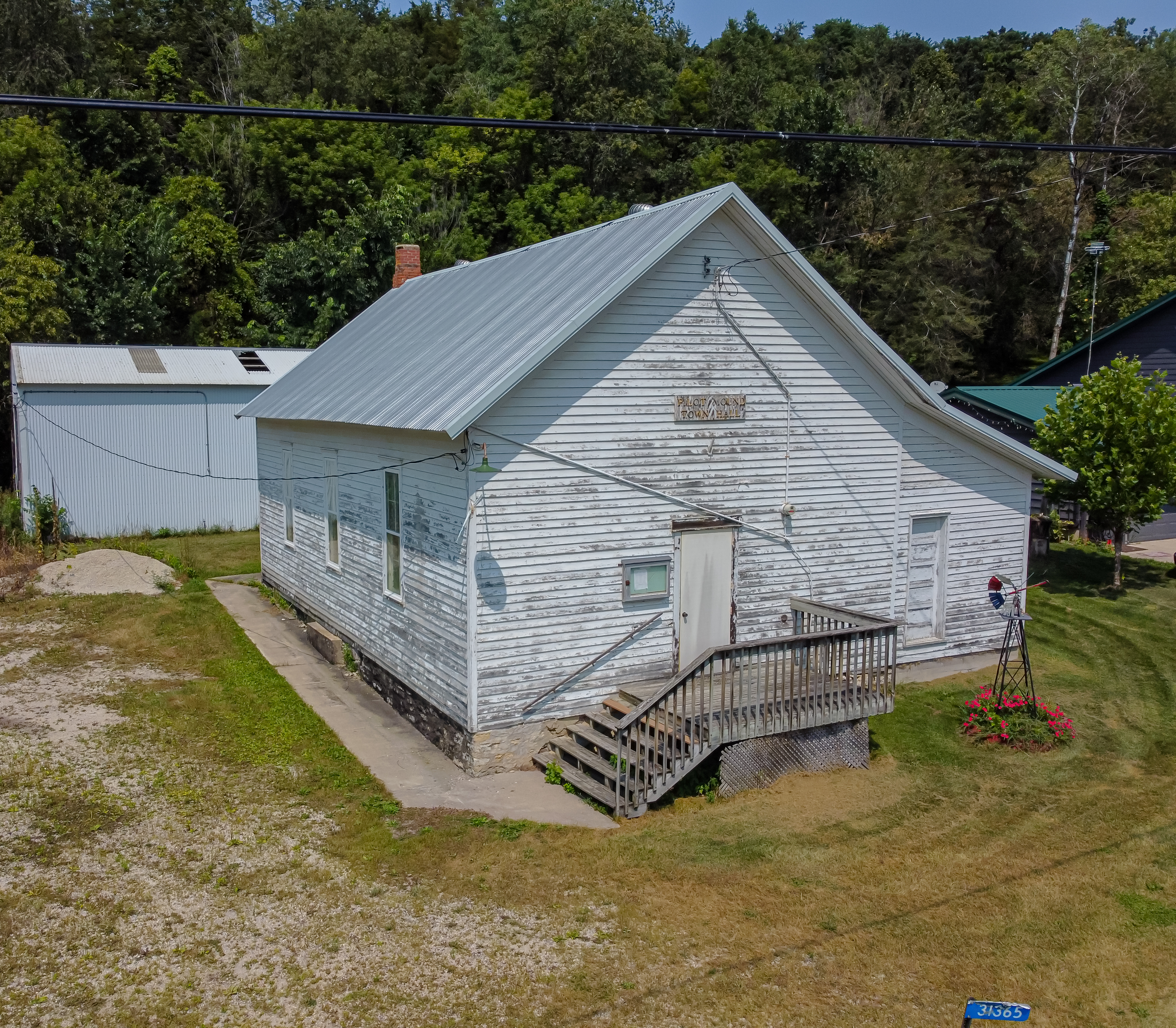
- Town hall

- Location within the state of Minnesota Pilot Mound Township, Minnesota (the United States)
- Coordinates: 43°48′54″N 92°2′9″W
- Country: United States
- State: Minnesota
- County: Fillmore

Area
  - Total: 34.3 sq mi (88.8 km^{2})
  - Land: 34.2 sq mi (88.6 km^{2})
  - Water: 0.077 sq mi (0.2 km^{2})
- Elevation: 1,066 ft (325 m)

Population (2000)
  - Total: 364
  - Density: 11/sq mi (4.1/km^{2})
- Time zone: UTC-6 (Central (CST))
  - Summer (DST): UTC-5 (CDT)
- ZIP code: 55923
- Area code: 507
- FIPS code: 27-51010
- GNIS feature ID: 0665300

Pilot Mound Township is a township in Fillmore County, Minnesota, United States. The population was 364 at the 2000 census.

Pilot Mound Township was organized in 1858, and named for a local hill which served as a navigational landmark to pioneer travelers.

== Geography ==
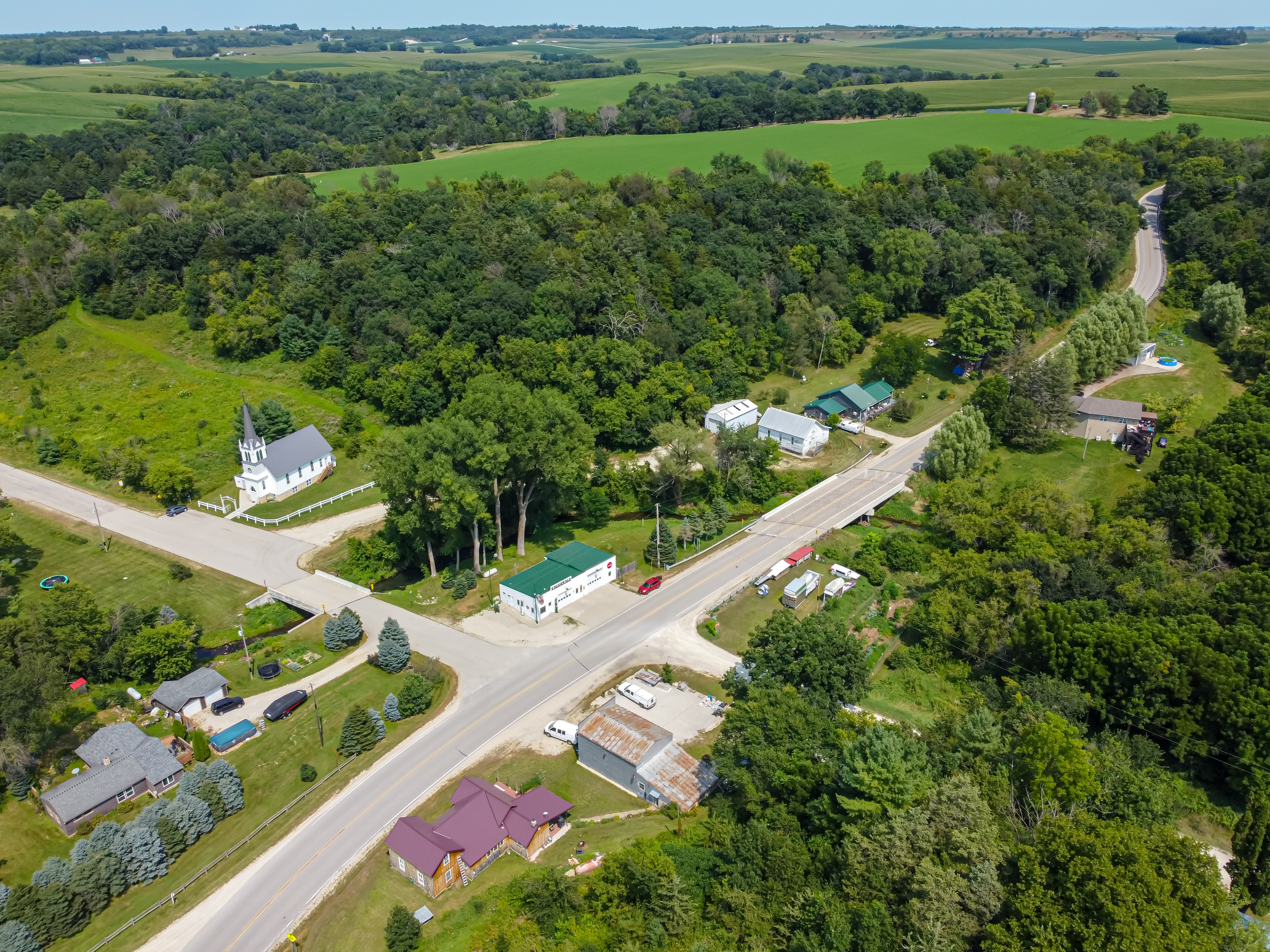
MN-30 runs through town

According to the United States Census Bureau, the township has a total area of 34.3 square miles (88.8 km^{2}), of which 34.2 square miles (88.6 km^{2}) is land and 0.1 square mile (0.2 km^{2}) (0.18%) is water.

== Demographics ==
As of the census of 2000, there were 364 people, 129 households, and 107 families residing in the township. The population density was 10.6 people per square mile (4.1/km^{2}). There were 155 housing units at an average density of 4.5/sq mi (1.7/km^{2}). The racial makeup of the township was 98.35% White, 0.27% Asian, 1.10% from other races, and 0.27% from two or more races. Hispanic or Latino of any race were 1.10% of the population.

There were 129 households, out of which 38.8% had children under the age of 18 living with them, 72.9% were married couples living together, 7.8% had a female householder with no husband present, and 16.3% were non-families. 14.0% of all households were made up of individuals, and 6.2% had someone living alone who was 65 years of age or older. The average household size was 2.82 and the average family size was 3.08.

In the township the population was spread out, with 26.9% under the age of 18, 6.6% from 18 to 24, 31.6% from 25 to 44, 22.3% from 45 to 64, and 12.6% who were 65 years of age or older. The median age was 37 years. For every 100 females, there were 104.5 males. For every 100 females age 18 and over, there were 107.8 males.

The median income for a household in the township was $45,625, and the median income for a family was $44,792. Males had a median income of $26,071 versus $20,909 for females. The per capita income for the township was $16,877. About 6.4% of families and 7.1% of the population were below the poverty line, including 8.9% of those under age 18 and 7.4% of those age 65 or over.

== Notable people ==
- T. E. Sorenson, Minnesota state senator
