= Hallock, Minnesota =

City in Minnesota, United States

Hallock
- City
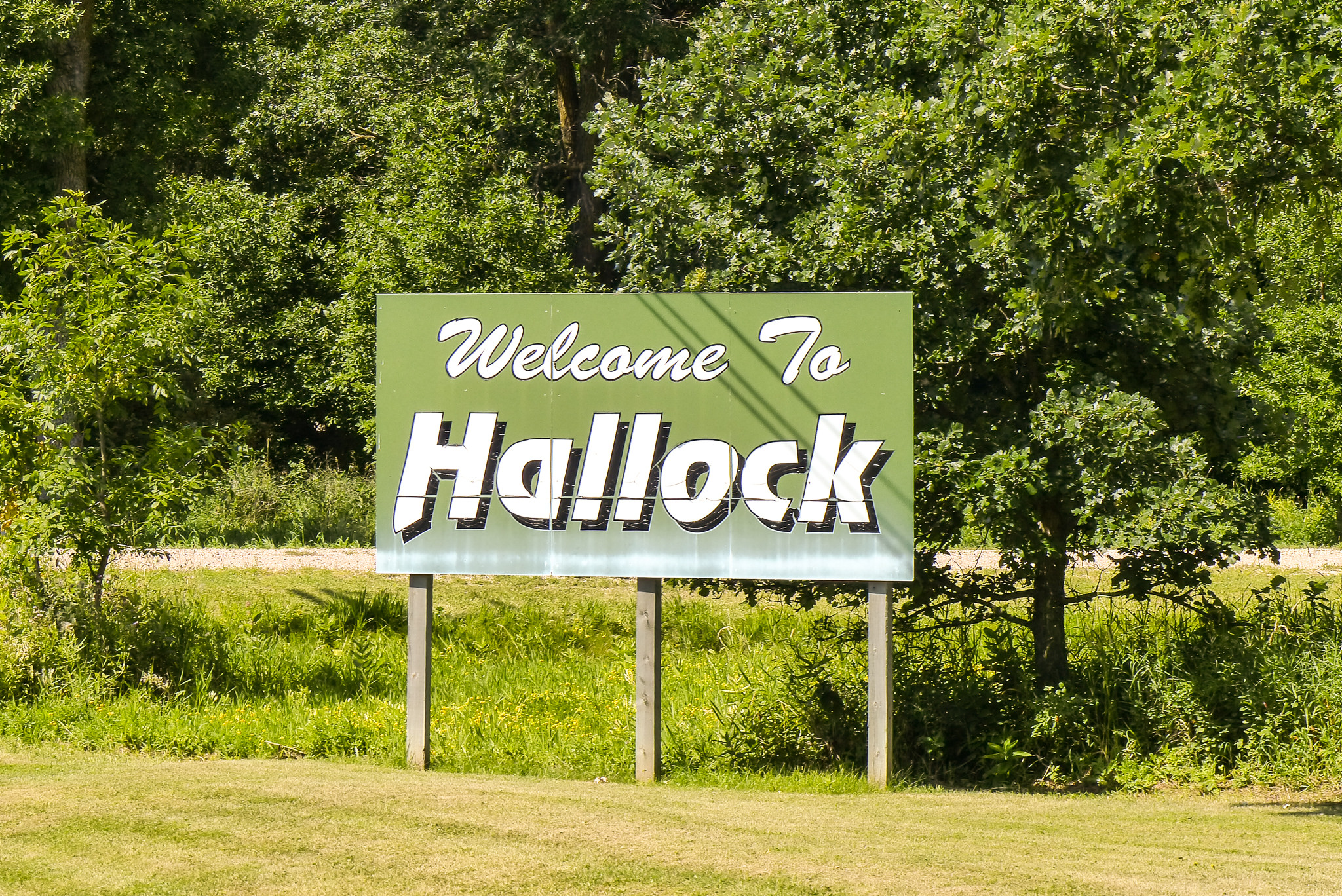
- Hallock Minnesota welcome sign

- Location of Hallock within Kittson County and state of Minnesota
- Coordinates: 48°46′20″N 96°56′38″W
- Country: United States
- State: Minnesota
- County: Kittson
- Founded: 1879
- Incorporated: June 11, 1887

Government
  - Mayor: Dave Treumer

Area
  - Total: 2.20 sq mi (5.69 km^{2})
  - Land: 2.13 sq mi (5.52 km^{2})
  - Water: 0.066 sq mi (0.17 km^{2})
- Elevation: 817 ft (249 m)

Population (2020)
  - Total: 906
  - Estimate (2022): 872
  - Density: 425.1/sq mi (164.13/km^{2})
- Time zone: UTC−6 (Central (CST))
  - Summer (DST): UTC−5 (CDT)
- ZIP code: 56728
- Area code: 218
- FIPS code: 27-26576
- GNIS feature ID: 0644582
- Sales tax: 6.875%
- Website: hallockmn.org

Hallock (/ˈhælɒk/ HAL-ok) is a city in and the county seat of Kittson County, Minnesota, United States. The population was 906 at the 2020 census.

== History ==
Hallock was platted in 1879. The city was named for Charles Hallock, an American writer. Hallock was incorporated as a city in 1887. A post office has been in operation at Hallock since 1879.

== Geography ==
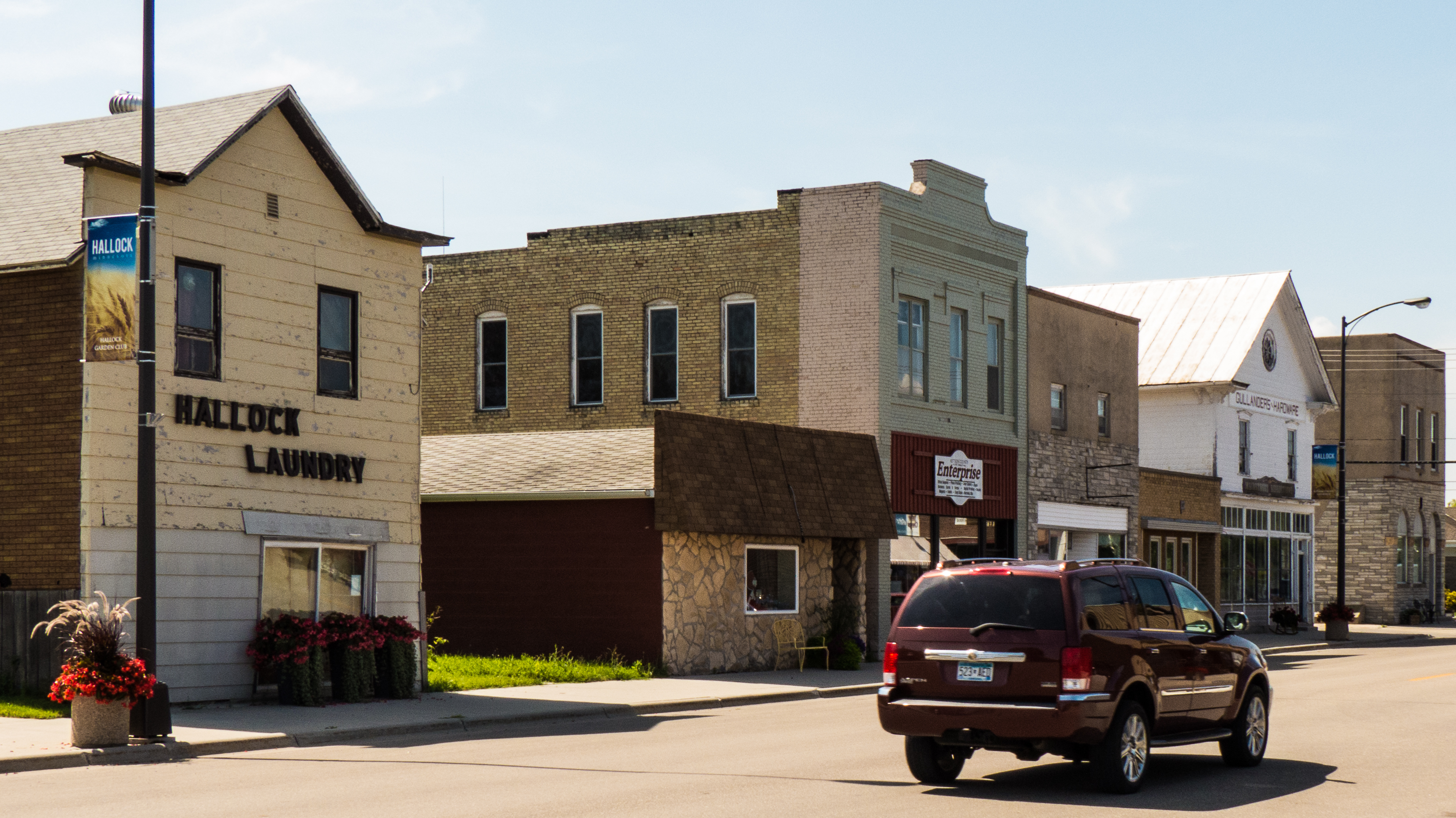
Street in Hallock

According to the United States Census Bureau, the city has a total area of 2.10 square miles (5.44 km^{2}), of which 2.04 square miles (5.28 km^{2}) is land and 0.06 square miles (0.16 km^{2}) is water.

U.S. Highway 75 and Minnesota State Highway 175 are two of the main routes in the city.

Hallock Municipal Airport serves the city, being just one mile south of Hallock.

=== Climate ===
Climate data for Hallock, Minnesota (1991–2020 normals, extremes 1899–present)
Month	Jan	Feb	Mar	Apr	May	Jun	Jul	Aug	Sep	Oct	Nov	Dec	Year
Record high °F (°C)	51 (11)	61 (16)	77 (25)	98 (37)	101 (38)	103 (39)	109 (43)	104 (40)	102 (39)	92 (33)	75 (24)	54 (12)	109 (43)
Mean maximum °F (°C)	36.1 (2.3)	35.9 (2.2)	49.3 (9.6)	69.4 (20.8)	86.0 (30.0)	89.1 (31.7)	89.7 (32.1)	92.1 (33.4)	84.5 (29.2)	72.7 (22.6)	51.0 (10.6)	34.8 (1.6)	88.5 (31.4)
Mean daily maximum °F (°C)	13.1 (−10.5)	17.7 (−7.9)	31.6 (−0.2)	50.1 (10.1)	66.3 (19.1)	75.8 (24.3)	79.4 (26.3)	78.6 (25.9)	68.7 (20.4)	51.7 (10.9)	33.9 (1.1)	19.0 (−7.2)	48.8 (9.3)
Daily mean °F (°C)	4.5 (−15.3)	8.6 (−13.0)	23.7 (−4.6)	40.1 (4.5)	54.5 (12.5)	64.7 (18.2)	68.4 (20.2)	67.0 (19.4)	57.2 (14.0)	42.6 (5.9)	26.2 (−3.2)	11.8 (−11.2)	39.1 (3.9)
Mean daily minimum °F (°C)	−6.3 (−21.3)	−0.4 (−18.0)	15.8 (−9.0)	30.0 (−1.1)	42.7 (5.9)	53.7 (12.1)	57.4 (14.1)	55.5 (13.1)	45.8 (7.7)	33.4 (0.8)	18.5 (−7.5)	4.6 (−15.2)	29.4 (−1.4)
Mean minimum °F (°C)	−27.9 (−33.3)	−25.4 (−31.9)	−13.1 (−25.1)	12.0 (−11.1)	26.8 (−2.9)	42.1 (5.6)	46.5 (8.1)	44.3 (6.8)	30.0 (−1.1)	16.8 (−8.4)	−6.1 (−21.2)	−19.0 (−28.3)	−25.5 (−31.9)
Record low °F (°C)	−44 (−42)	−45 (−43)	−42 (−41)	−13 (−25)	11 (−12)	24 (−4)	34 (1)	28 (−2)	13 (−11)	−7 (−22)	−32 (−36)	−54 (−48)	−54 (−48)
Average precipitation inches (mm)	0.53 (13)	0.47 (12)	0.72 (18)	1.14 (29)	3.00 (76)	4.24 (108)	3.49 (89)	2.58 (66)	2.57 (65)	1.85 (47)	0.93 (24)	0.79 (20)	22.31 (567)
Average precipitation days (≥ 0.01 in)	3.7	3.0	3.7	4.1	7.0	8.5	9.2	6.1	6.9	5.0	4.7	5.6	67.5
Source: NOAA

== Demographics ==
Historical population
Census	Pop.	Note	%±
1890	302		—
1900	805		166.6%
1910	910		13.0%
1920	1,012		11.2%
1930	869		−14.1%
1940	1,353		55.7%
1950	1,552		14.7%
1960	1,527		−1.6%
1970	1,477		−3.3%
1980	1,405		−4.9%
1990	1,304		−7.2%
2000	1,196		−8.3%
2010	981		−18.0%
2020	906		−7.6%
2022 (est.)	872		−3.8%
U.S. Decennial Census; 2020 Census

=== 2020 census ===
As of the census of 2020, there were 906 people, 426 households, and 226 families living in the city. The population density was 425.1 inhabitants per square mile (164.1/km²). There were 510 housing units at an average density of 242.9 per square mile (93.8/km²). The racial makeup of the city was 95.3% White, 0.6% American Indian, 0.6% Asian, 0.2% Pacific Islander, 0.1% from some other race, and 3.3% from two or more races. Hispanic or Latino of any race were 3.4% of the population.

There were 426 households, of which 16.0% had children under the age of 18 living with them, 44.8% were married couples living together, 1.6% had a female householder with no spouse present, 0.7% had a male householder with no spouse present, and 46.9% were non-families. 42.3% of all households were made up of individuals, and 39.9% had someone living alone who was 65 years of age or older. The average household size was 1.99.

The median age in the city was 55.4 years. 16.9% of residents were under the age of 18; 6.0% were between the ages of 18 and 24; 17.1% were from 25 to 44; 29.0% were from 45 to 64; and 31.0% were 65 years of age or older. The gender makeup of the city was 48.1% male and 51.9% female.

=== 2010 census ===
As of the census of 2010, there were 981 people, 449 households and 256 families living in the city. The population density was 480.9 inhabitants per square mile (185.7/km^{2}). There were 549 housing units at an average density of 269.1 per square mile (103.9/km^{2}). The racial makeup of the city was 98.7% White, 0.1% African American, 0.6% Asian, 0.1% from other races, and 0.5% from two or more races. Hispanic or Latino of any race were 2.8% of the population.

There were 449 households, of which 19.2% had children under the age of 18 living with them, 49.9% were married couples living together, 4.9% had a female householder with no husband present, 2.2% had a male householder with no wife present, and 43.0% were non-families. 40.5% of all households were made up of individuals, and 23.4% had someone living alone who was 65 years of age or older. The average household size was 2.04 and the average family size was 2.77.

The median age in the city was 51.9 years. 17.7% of residents were under the age of 18; 4.1% were between the ages of 18 and 24; 17% were from 25 to 44; 31.5% were from 45 to 64; and 29.8% were 65 years of age or older. The gender makeup of the city was 47.2% male and 52.8% female.

=== 2000 census ===
As of the census of 2000, there were 1,196 people, 485 households and 305 families living in the city. The population density was 573.2 inhabitants per square mile (221.3/km^{2}). There were 586 housing units at an average density of 280.9 per square mile (108.5/km^{2}). The racial makeup of the city was 97.91% White, 0.08% African American, 0.17% Native American, 0.17% Asian, 0.59% from other races, and 1.09% from two or more races. Hispanic or Latino of any race were 1.42% of the population.

There were 485 households, of which 30.1% had children under the age of 18 living with them, 54.0% were married couples living together, 6.8% had a female householder with no husband present, and 37.1% were non-families. 35.3% of all households were made up of individuals, and 21.2% had someone living alone who was 65 years of age or older. The average household size was 2.29 and the average family size was 3.00.

24.8% of the population were under the age of 18, 3.8% from 18 to 24, 23.3% from 25 to 44, 21.1% from 45 to 64, and 26.9% who were 65 years of age or older. The median age was 44 years. For every 100 females, there were 81.5 males. For every 100 females age 18 and over, there were 81.3 males.

The median household income was $37,063 and the median family income was $46,042. Males had a median income of $31,848 compared with $21,136 for females. The per capita income for the city was $18,156. About 3.3% of families and 4.8% of the population were below the poverty line, including 4.0% of those under age 18 and 7.8% of those age 65 or over.

== Politics ==
Presidential election results

2020 Precinct Results Spreadsheet2016 Precinct Results Spreadsheet2012 Precinct Results Spreadsheet2008 Precinct Results Spreadsheet2004 Precinct Results Spreadsheet2000 Precinct Results Spreadsheet
Year	Republican	Democratic	Third parties
2020	49.0% 266	47.3% 257	3.7% 20
2016	51.3% 272	40.6% 215	8.1% 43
2012	47.7% 254	49.4% 263	2.9% 15
2008	37.3% 225	61.2% 369	1.5% 9
2004	46.7% 303	51.9% 337	1.4% 9
2000	47.8% 308	44.8% 289	7.4% 48

== In popular culture ==
Hallock was a main filming location in the Coen brothers' 1996 film Fargo, substituting as a fictional version of Brainerd, Minnesota due to Hallock having a better snowfall than Brainerd during production.

== Notable people ==
- Clifford W. Bouvette, Minnesota state representative
- Kristen Dexter, Wisconsin state legislator
- Marv Hanson, Minnesota state senator
- Bill Ingebrigtsen, Minnesota state senator
- Frederick McKinley Jones, inventor
- Donald Pederson, educator and inventor
- Bowtie Bub, barn cat
