= Pine Creek Township, Pennsylvania =

Pine Creek Township is the name of some places in the U.S. state of Pennsylvania:

- Pine Creek Township, Clinton County, Pennsylvania
- Pine Creek Township, Jefferson County, Pennsylvania
