= Pine Creek (Jacks Fork tributary) =

Stream in Missouri, United States

Location
- Country: United States
- State: Missouri
- Region: Howell and Texas counties

Physical characteristics
- Source
  - location: Howell County, Missouri
  - coordinates: 37°03′11″N 92°00′16″W
- Mouth
  - location: Texas County, Missouri
  - coordinates: 37°05′12″N 91°49′32″W
  - elevation: 304 m (997 ft)

Pine Creek is a stream in northern Howell and southern Texas counties in the Ozarks of southern Missouri. It is a tributary of Jacks Fork. The headwaters of Pine Creek arise just east of the community of Sterling (northwest of Willow Springs) and the flow is to the east-northeast passing under Missouri Route HH and into Texas County. The stream passes under Missouri Route 137 and on to the east past the community of Hattie to its confluence with Jacks Fork at Missouri Route Y.

Pine Creek was so named due to the pine timber along its course.

== See also ==
- List of rivers of Missouri
