= Pinecreek, Minnesota =

Pinecreek
- Unincorporated community
- Location within Minnesota Location within the United States
- Coordinates: 48°58′42″N 95°56′34″W
- Country: United States
- State: Minnesota
- County: Roseau County
- Township: Dieter Township
- Elevation: 1,050 ft (320 m)
- Time zone: UTC-6 (Central (CST))
  - Summer (DST): UTC-5 (CDT)
- ZIP code: 56751
- Area code: 218
- GNIS feature ID: 649501

Pinecreek is an unincorporated community in Dieter Township, Roseau County, Minnesota, United States, near the Canada–US border. The community is located northwest of Roseau at the junction of State Highway 89 (MN 89) and Roseau County Road 3.

Pinecreek is the location of Piney Pinecreek Border Airport, which straddled the Canada–US border, until its closure in December 27, 2024. The community took its name from nearby Pine Creek which flows through the community. A post office called Pinecreek was established in 1896, and remained in operation until 1975. Nearby places include Roseau, Badger, and Piney, Manitoba.

== See also ==
- Pinecreek–Piney Border Crossing
