= Pine Creek Township =

Pine Creek Township may refer to:

- Pine Creek Township, Ogle County, Illinois
- Pine Creek Township, Ozark County, Missouri, in Ozark County, Missouri
- Pine Creek Township, Clinton County, Pennsylvania
- Pine Creek Township, Jefferson County, Pennsylvania
