= Pine Creek (Gasconade River tributary) =

Stream in the American state of Missouri

Pine Creek is a stream in Laclede County, Missouri. It is a tributary of the Gasconade River.

The stream headwaters are at 37°29′08″N 92°18′37″W and the confluence with the Gasconade is at 37°32′57″N 92°21′49″W. The stream source is in southern Laclede County just northwest of Missouri Route 95 and west of Lynchburg. The stream flows northwest past the community of Southard and on to join the Gasconade to the southwest of Nebo. The stream is within the Mark Twain National Forest.

Pine Creek was named for the pine timber near its course.

== See also ==
- List of rivers of Missouri
