= Pine Creek (Sauk County, Wisconsin) =

Stream in Sauk County, Wisconsin, U.S.

Coordinates: 43°28′25″N 89°47′42″W

Pine Creek is a stream in Sauk County, Wisconsin, in the United States.

Pine Creek was named for the pine trees lining its banks.

== See also ==
- List of rivers of Wisconsin
