= Wayne Popham =

American politician

- 1963 portrait of Popham

Member of the Minnesota Senate from the 35th district
- In office 1963–1972

Personal details
- Born: October 23, 1929 (age 97) Florence, South Dakota, U.S.
- Party: Conservative
- Education: University of Minnesota, University of Minnesota Law School
- Occupation: attorney

Wayne G. Popham (born October 23, 1929) is an American politician in the state of Minnesota. He served in the Minnesota State Senate from 1963 to 1972 (district 35).
