= Pine Creek (Big Sugar Creek tributary) =

Stream in the U.S. state of Missouri

Location
- Country: United States
- State: Missouri
- Region: McDonald County

Physical characteristics
- Source
  - coordinates: 36°32′24″N 94°10′46″W
  - elevation: 1,380 ft (420 m)
- Mouth
  - coordinates: 36°34′26″N 94°08′25″W
  - elevation: 1,037 ft (316 m)

Pine Creek is a stream in McDonald County in the U.S. state of Missouri. It is a tributary of Big Sugar Creek.

Pine Creek was so named on account of pine timber near its course.

== See also ==
- List of rivers of Missouri
