= Dieter Township, Roseau County, Minnesota =

Township in Minnesota, United States

Dieter Township, Minnesota
- Township
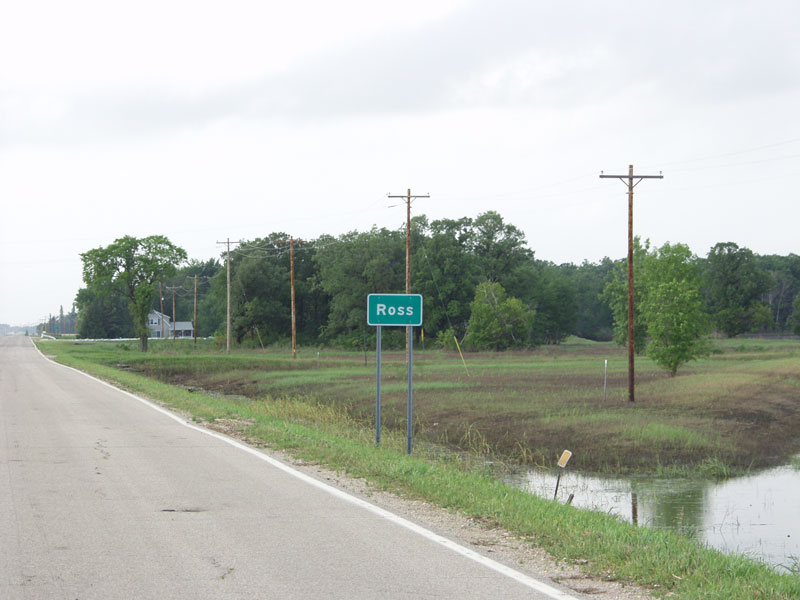
- Signpost for Ross, a community in Dieter Township

- Location of Dieter Township, within Roseau County, Minnesota
- Coordinates: 48°57′24″N 95°57′13″W
- Country: United States
- State: Minnesota
- County: Roseau

Area
  - Total: 44.4 sq mi (115.0 km^{2})
  - Land: 44.4 sq mi (115.0 km^{2})
  - Water: 0 sq mi (0.0 km^{2})
- Elevation: 1,040 ft (317 m)

Population (2020)
  - Total: 148
  - Density: 3.33/sq mi (1.29/km^{2})
- Time zone: UTC-6 (Central (CST))
  - Summer (DST): UTC-5 (CDT)
- FIPS code: 27-15958
- GNIS feature ID: 0663979

Dieter Township is a township in Roseau County, Minnesota, United States, located along the Canada–US border. The population was 148 at the 2020 census. Dieter Township contains the unincorporated communities of Pinecreek and Ross.

Dieter Township was named for Martin Van Buren Dieter, an early settler.

== Geography ==
According to the United States Census Bureau, the township has a total area of 44.4 square miles (115 km^{2}), all land.

== Demographics ==
As of the census of 2000, there were 162 people, 65 households, and 51 families residing in the township. The population density was 3.6 inhabitants per square mile (1.4/km^{2}). There were 77 housing units at an average density of 1.7 per square mile (0.66/km^{2}). The racial makeup of the township was 98.77% White, 0.62% Asian, and 0.62% from other races. Hispanics or Latinos of any race were 0.62% of the population.

There were 65 households, out of which 27.7% had children under the age of 18 living with them, 66.2% were married couples living together, 4.6% had a female householder with no husband present, and 21.5% were non-families. 15.4% of all households were made up of individuals, and 6.2% had someone living alone who was 65 years of age or older. The average household size was 2.49 and the average family size was 2.78.

In the township the population was spread out, with 21.6% under the age of 18, 6.2% from 18 to 24, 27.2% from 25 to 44, 24.1% from 45 to 64, and 21.0% who were 65 years of age or older. The median age was 43 years. For every 100 females, there were 105.1 males. For every 100 females aged 18 and over, there were 111.7 males.

The median income for a household in the township was $45,875, and the median income for a family was $47,143. Males had a median income of $30,455 versus $31,667 for females. The per capita income for the township was $18,128. None of the families and 5.9% of the population were living below the poverty line, including no under eighteens and 10.7% of those over 64.

It is served by the unique Piney Pinecreek Border Airport, which has a runway across the international border.
