= Bernard Lieder =

American politician (1923–2020)

Bernie Lieder

Member of the Minnesota House of Representatives
- In office January 7, 1985 – January 2, 2011
- Preceded by: Tony Stadum
- Succeeded by: Deb Kiel
- Constituency: District 2A (1985–2003); District 1B (2003–2011)

Personal details
- Born: February 19, 1923
- Died: August 23, 2020 (aged 97)
- Party: Minnesota Democratic-Farmer-Labor Party
- Spouse: Shirley (deceased)
- Children: 3
- Education: Purdue University; University of Illinois
- Profession: engineer, legislator, veteran

Bernard L. "Bernie" Lieder (February 19, 1923 – August 23, 2020) was an American politician who served as a member of the Minnesota House of Representatives. He represented District 1B, which includes portions of Marshall, Pennington, Polk and Red Lake counties in the northwestern part of the state.

== Early ==
Lieder attended Purdue University in Lafayette, Indiana, and the University of Illinois in the twin cities of Urbana and Champaign, Illinois, to study Engineering. He also served in the U.S. Army in France, Belgium, Holland and Germany during and after World War II (1943–1946).

== Career ==
Lieder was first elected in 1984, and was re-elected every two years until the 2010 general election, when he was unseated by Republican Debra Kiel. Prior to the 2002 legislative redistricting, he represented the old District 2A. He was a member of the House Agriculture, Rural Economies and Veterans Affairs Subcommittee for the Veterans Affairs Division, and of the Finance subcommittees for the Capital Investment Finance Division, the Transportation and Transit Policy and Oversight Division, and the Transportation Finance and Policy Division, which he chaired. He chaired several incorporations of the Transportation Finance and Policy Division subcommittee through the years. He also chaired the General Legislation, Veterans Affairs, and Elections Committee during the 1993-1994 biennium.

== Distinctions ==
Lieder was a retired professional engineer. He was also the last member of the House to have served in World War II.

== Death ==
Lieder died on August 23, 2020, at the age of 97.
