= Neil Sherman Haugerud =

American politician (1930–2012)

Neil Sherman Haugerud (July 3, 1930 – June 6, 2012) was an American politician, farmer, and businessman.

Haugerud was born in Canton, Minnesota. He graduated from Harmony High School in Harmony, Minnesota in 1948. He served in the United States Marine Corps during the Korean War. He went to the University of Minnesota and Winona State University. Haugerud was a farmer and securities broker. Haugerud served as sheriff for Fillmore County, Minnesota from 1959 to 1967. He served in the Minnesota House of Representatives from 1969 to 1977 and was a Democrat. Haugerud died at Chosen Valley Care Center in Chatfield, Minnesota.
