= Deb Kiel =

American politician

Member of the Minnesota House of Representatives from the 1B district
- In office January 4, 2011 – January 14, 2025
- Preceded by: Bernard Lieder
- Succeeded by: Steve Gander

Personal details
- Born: August 31, 1957 (age 68) Crookston, Minnesota, U.S.
- Party: Republican
- Spouse: Lonn
- Children: 4
- Education: Concordia College
- Occupation: Farmer; Homemaker; Legislator
- Website: Government website Campaign website

Debra L. Kiel (/kiːl/ KEEL; born August 31, 1957) is an American politician who served from 2011 to 2025 in the Minnesota House of Representatives. A member of the Republican Party of Minnesota, Kiel represented District 1B in northwest Minnesota, which includes the cities of Crookston and East Grand Forks and Norman, Polk, Clay, and Red Lake Counties.

== Early life, education, and career ==
Kiel was born and raised on a farm south of Crookston, Minnesota. She graduated from Crookston High School and attended Concordia College in Moorhead.

Kiel was a member of the Crookston School Board for seven years, serving as its chair and treasurer. She and her husband are sugar beet farmers.

== Minnesota House of Representatives ==
Kiel was elected to the Minnesota House of Representatives in 2010 and was reelected every two years until 2022. She defeated 13-term DFL incumbent Bernard Lieder.

Kiel served as the minority lead of the Human Services Policy Committee and on the Health Finance and Policy and Ethics Committees. From 2015 to 2016, she served as an assistant majority leader, and from 2017 to 2018 she chaired the Subcommittee on Aging and Long-Term Care, a subcommittee of the Health and Human Services Reform Committee.

In January 2024, Kiel announced she would not seek reelection that year.

=== Health care and long-term care ===
Kiel supported increasing funding for student loan forgiveness for doctors who agree to practice in rural areas, and increasing that program to include nurses, dentists, and mental health workers. She opposed increasing the state tobacco tax, saying people in her district would drive to North Dakota to buy cigarettes.

As chair of the subcommittee on aging, Kiel introduced legislation to better protect seniors from retaliation when they report elder abuse and establish work groups to review crimes against vulnerable adults like those with dementia. She co-authored an op-ed arguing that employers need to "hold on" to older workers to solve workforce shortage issues.

==== Abortion ====
Kiel opposes abortion rights and has sponsored legislation to increase inspection requirements at abortion facilities and require them to be specially licensed. She has called for audits of Planned Parenthood and said it should be able to show it is "not marketing baby parts".

=== Other political positions ===
In 2011, Kiel was one of four Republican representatives to vote against roughly $1 billion in budget cuts to local government aid and higher education. She visited Israel and the West Bank in 2019 with a bipartisan delegation from the Minnesota legislature.

== Electoral results ==
2010 Minnesota State House - District 1B
Party	Candidate	Votes	%
Republican	Debra "Deb" Kiel	6,528	50.48
Democratic (DFL)	Bernie (Bernard) L. Lieder (incumbent)	6,397	49.47
Write-in		7	0.05
Total votes		12,932	100.00
Republican gain from Democratic (DFL)			

2012 Minnesota State House - District 1B
Party	Candidate	Votes	%
Republican	Debra "Deb" Kiel (incumbent)	9,401	51.90
Democratic (DFL)	Marc Demers	8,685	47.95
Write-in		27	0.15
Total votes		18,113	100.00
Republican hold			

2014 Minnesota State House - District 1B
Party	Candidate	Votes	%
Republican	Debra "Deb" Kiel (incumbent)	7,176	55.61
Democratic (DFL)	Eric Bergeson	5,721	44.34
Write-in		6	0.05
Total votes		12,903	100.00
Republican hold			

2016 Minnesota State House - District 1B
Party	Candidate	Votes	%
Republican	Debra "Deb" Kiel (incumbent)	11,895	64.75
Democratic (DFL)	Michael "Mike" Moore	6,458	35.15
Write-in		19	0.10
Total votes		18,372	100.00
Republican hold			

2018 Minnesota State House - District 1B
Party	Candidate	Votes	%
Republican	Debra "Deb" Kiel (incumbent)	10,026	65.94
Democratic (DFL)	Brent Lindstrom	5,173	34.02
Write-in		6	0.04
Total votes		15,205	100.00
Republican hold			

2020 Minnesota State House - District 1B
Party	Candidate	Votes	%
Republican	Debra "Deb" Kiel (incumbent)	13,904	70.90
Democratic (DFL)	Cindy Ansbacher	5,687	29.00
Write-in		19	0.10
Total votes		19,601	100.00
Republican hold			

2022 Minnesota State House - District 1B
Party	Candidate	Votes	%
Republican	Debra "Deb" Kiel (incumbent)	10,878	71.13
Democratic (DFL)	Cindy Ansbacher	4,399	28.76
Write-in		16	0.10
Total votes		15,293	100.00
Republican hold			

== Personal life ==
Kiel married her husband, Lonn, in 1977. They have four children and 12 grandchildren. Kiel is active at her home church, Our Savior’s Lutheran. Lonn ran three unsuccessful campaigns against Bernard Lieder before Deb unseated him.

On March 20, 2023, Kiel announced she had a stroke while at the State Office Building, and returned home to recover.

Kiel's great-grandfather, John Perry, a Crookston farmer, represented Polk County in the Minnesota House during the 1921-22 biennium.
