= Jerome O. Gunderson =

American businessman, farmer and politician

Jerome Gunderson

Member of the Minnesota Senate
- In office 1977–1980

Personal details
- Born: January 7, 1923 Spring Grove, Minnesota, U.S.
- Died: December 19, 2016 (aged 93) Spring Grove, Minnesota, U.S.
- Party: Democratic

Jerome Odell Gunderson, Sr. (January 7, 1923 – December 19, 2016) was an American businessman, farmer, and politician who served as a member of the Minnesota Senate from 1977 to 1980.

== Early life ==
Gunderson was born in Spring Grove, Minnesota and graduated from Spring Grove High School.

== Career ==
He lived in Mabel, Minnesota and was a farmer. Gunderson was also involved with the insurance business. Gunderson served on the Mabel-Canton School Board and in the Minnesota Senate from 1977 to 1980 as a member of the Minnesota Democratic–Farmer–Labor Party.

== Death ==
He died at Gundersen-Tweeten Health Care in Spring Grove, Minnesota.
