= Pine Creek (Roseau River tributary) =

Stream in Roseau County, Minnesota, U.S.

Coordinates: 48°55′10″N 95°52′46″W

Pine Creek is a stream in Roseau County, in the U.S. state of Minnesota.

Log driving on this stream of pine timber accounts for the name.

== See also ==
- List of rivers of Minnesota
