= Maxine Penas =

American politician and educator

Maxine Marilyn Penas (née Sluka) (October 6, 1946 – December 29, 2008) was an American politician and educator.

Born in Roseau, Minnesota, Penas went to Corbett College at Mount Saint Benedict in Crookston, Minnesota. She then graduated from Saint Benedict College in 1968. She was a school teacher and farmer, and lived in Badger, Minnesota. Penas served in the Minnesota House of Representatives from 2001 to 2006 and was a Republican. She died in Roseau, Minnesota after suffering a stroke.
