= John R. Corbid =

American politician (1945–2026)

John Richard Corbid (February 11, 1945 – March 21, 2026) was an American politician and educator.

== Life and career ==
Corbid lived in Oklee, Red Lake County, Minnesota, with his wife and family. He received his bachelor's degree in social science from University of North Dakota and was a teacher. Corbid served in the Minnesota House of Representatives from 1975 to 1980 and was a Democrat. He died in Park Rapids, Minnesota, on March 21, 2026, at the age of 81.
