= Preston, Minnesota =

City in Minnesota, United States

Preston
- City
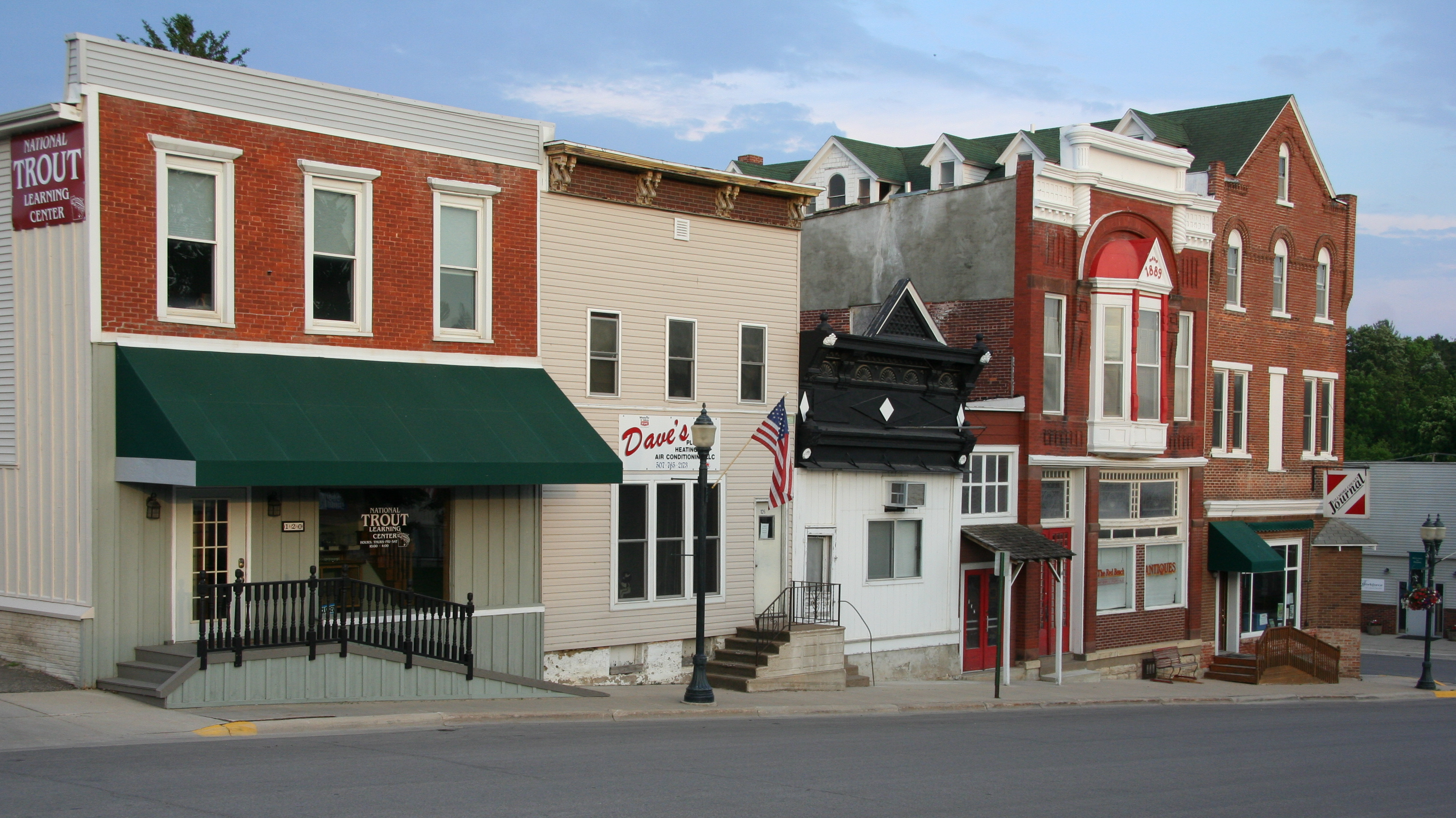
- Preston Main Street commercial district
- Nickname: "Minnesota's Trout Capitol"
- Location of Preston within Fillmore County and state of Minnesota
- Coordinates: 43°40′21″N 92°04′58″W
- Country: United States
- State: Minnesota
- County: Fillmore

Area
  - Total: 2.46 sq mi (6.38 km^{2})
  - Land: 2.46 sq mi (6.38 km^{2})
  - Water: 0 sq mi (0.00 km^{2})
- Elevation: 955 ft (291 m)

Population (2020)
  - Total: 1,322
  - Density: 536.4/sq mi (207.11/km^{2})
- Time zone: UTC-6 (Central (CST))
  - Summer (DST): UTC-5 (CDT)
- ZIP code: 55965
- Area code: 507
- FIPS code: 27-52450
- GNIS feature ID: 2396272
- Website: https://prestonmn.gov/

Preston is a city in and the county seat of Fillmore County, Minnesota, United States. As of the 2020 census, Preston had a population of 1,322. The Root River runs through it, and Mystery Cave State Park is nearby. It bills itself as "America's Trout Capital," with a 20-foot trout placed along Minnesota State Highway 16.

== History ==
Preston was platted in 1855. The community was named for Luther Preston, a millwright and postmaster. The old Preston grain elevator used to be known as the Milwaukee Elevator Company Grain Elevator. It was built around 1890 for holding grain for shipment by railroad to the Eastern cities of the United States. The elevator was last used in the 1980s. It was built with "cribbed" construction, which has to do with interlocking bins. At the time it was a lot stronger and a lot more expensive to build it this way than to build it in stud construction. Now the Preston Historical Society is trying to restore the structure.

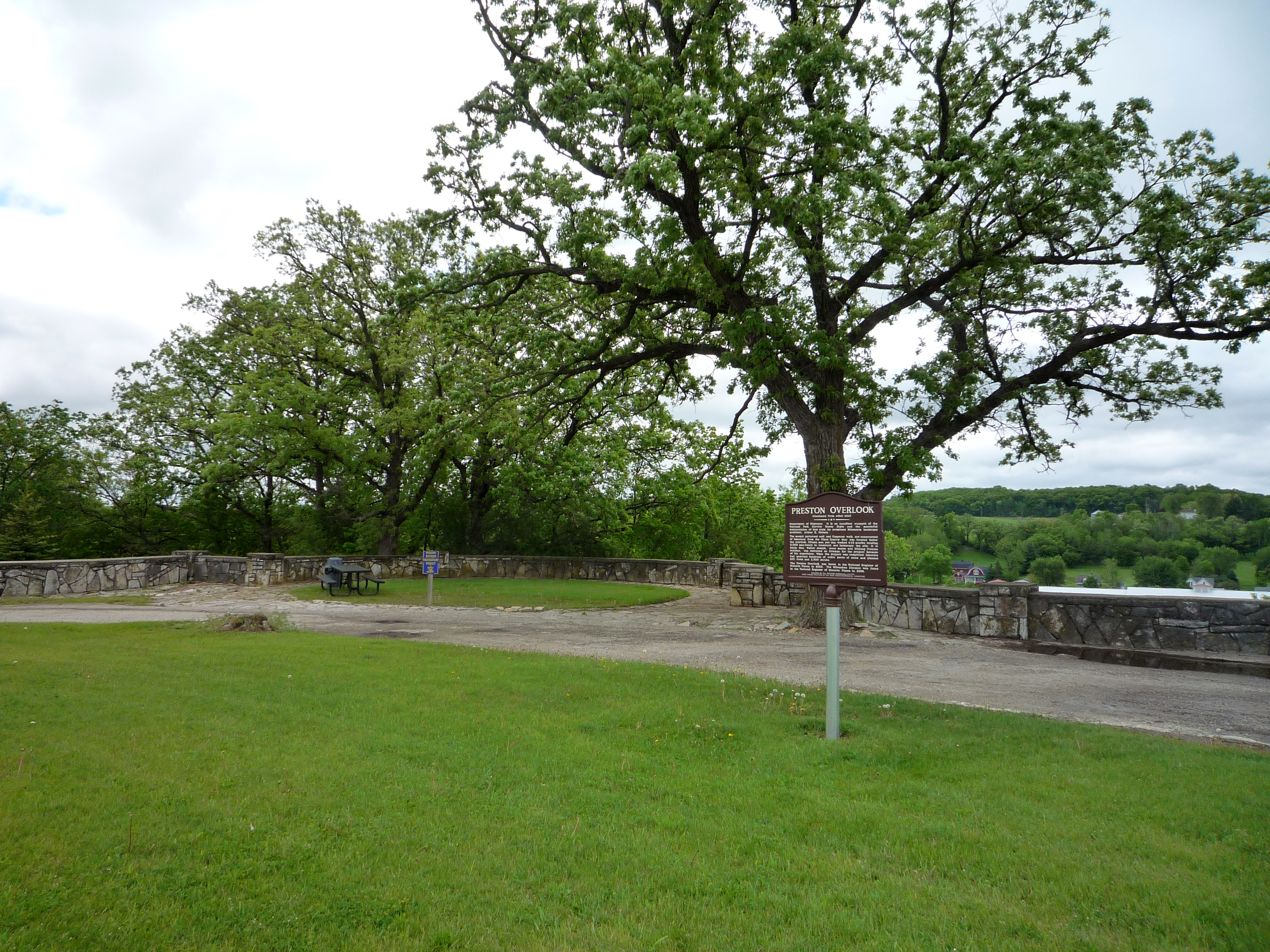
The Preston Overlook on the bluff above the city

The Preston Overlook was built in 1937 by the Minnesota Department of Highways under the program of Federal Relief Construction during the New Deal. A site was chosen on the highest point on the bluffs above the Root River, 90 feet below. The Preston Overlook was listed on the National Register of Historic Places in 2003.

== Geography ==
According to the United States Census Bureau, the city has a total area of 2.45 square miles (6.35 km^{2}), all land. The South Branch of the Root River snakes through the city.

U.S. Highway 52 and Minnesota Highway 16 are two of the main routes in the city.

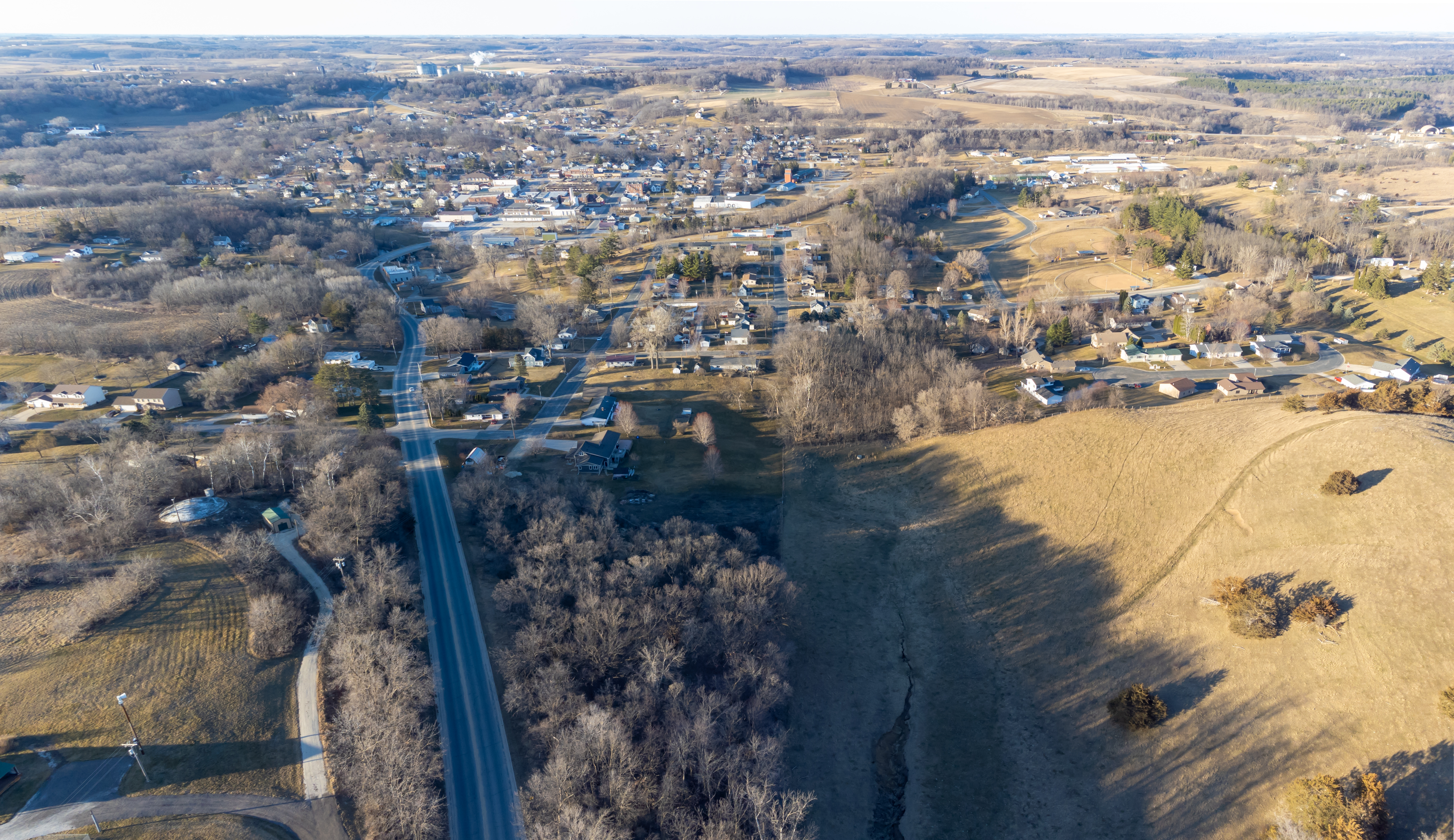

=== Climate ===
According to the Köppen Climate Classification system, Preston has a warm-summer humid continental climate, abbreviated "Dfb" on climate maps. The hottest temperature recorded in Preston was 101 °F (38.3 °C) on July 18, 1964, August 2, 1964, July 14, 1995, and July 7, 2012, while the coldest temperature recorded was −45 °F (−42.8 °C) on February 3, 1996 and February 1, 2019.

Climate data for Preston, Minnesota, 1991–2020 normals, extremes 1952–present
Month	Jan	Feb	Mar	Apr	May	Jun	Jul	Aug	Sep	Oct	Nov	Dec	Year
Record high °F (°C)	57 (14)	65 (18)	82 (28)	91 (33)	94 (34)	100 (38)	101 (38)	101 (38)	98 (37)	92 (33)	76 (24)	63 (17)	101 (38)
Mean maximum °F (°C)	44.2 (6.8)	48.1 (8.9)	65.7 (18.7)	78.5 (25.8)	86.2 (30.1)	91.2 (32.9)	92.0 (33.3)	90.6 (32.6)	87.4 (30.8)	80.8 (27.1)	64.4 (18.0)	48.3 (9.1)	94.0 (34.4)
Mean daily maximum °F (°C)	23.6 (−4.7)	28.2 (−2.1)	40.9 (4.9)	55.4 (13.0)	67.6 (19.8)	77.7 (25.4)	81.1 (27.3)	79.3 (26.3)	72.5 (22.5)	58.8 (14.9)	42.7 (5.9)	29.4 (−1.4)	54.8 (12.6)
Daily mean °F (°C)	13.8 (−10.1)	18.1 (−7.7)	30.7 (−0.7)	43.7 (6.5)	55.7 (13.2)	65.9 (18.8)	69.6 (20.9)	67.5 (19.7)	59.9 (15.5)	46.7 (8.2)	33.0 (0.6)	20.5 (−6.4)	43.8 (6.5)
Mean daily minimum °F (°C)	4.1 (−15.5)	8.0 (−13.3)	20.6 (−6.3)	32.1 (0.1)	43.7 (6.5)	54.0 (12.2)	58.2 (14.6)	55.7 (13.2)	47.3 (8.5)	34.6 (1.4)	23.2 (−4.9)	11.7 (−11.3)	32.8 (0.4)
Mean minimum °F (°C)	−19.9 (−28.8)	−15.3 (−26.3)	−2.7 (−19.3)	17.9 (−7.8)	28.3 (−2.1)	40.6 (4.8)	47.4 (8.6)	46.0 (7.8)	32.2 (0.1)	19.9 (−6.7)	6.5 (−14.2)	−10.4 (−23.6)	−24.1 (−31.2)
Record low °F (°C)	−44 (−42)	−45 (−43)	−35 (−37)	−8 (−22)	18 (−8)	31 (−1)	35 (2)	30 (−1)	19 (−7)	7 (−14)	−19 (−28)	−35 (−37)	−45 (−43)
Average precipitation inches (mm)	1.09 (28)	1.18 (30)	2.00 (51)	3.84 (98)	4.52 (115)	5.95 (151)	4.17 (106)	4.29 (109)	3.68 (93)	2.73 (69)	1.89 (48)	1.44 (37)	36.78 (935)
Average snowfall inches (cm)	11.0 (28)	8.2 (21)	7.5 (19)	2.5 (6.4)	0.3 (0.76)	0.0 (0.0)	0.0 (0.0)	0.0 (0.0)	0.0 (0.0)	0.3 (0.76)	2.6 (6.6)	9.8 (25)	42.2 (107.52)
Average precipitation days (≥ 0.01 in)	8.4	7.0	8.6	11.0	13.8	13.1	10.6	10.4	9.6	9.9	7.4	8.9	118.7
Average snowy days (≥ 0.1 in)	7.9	6.5	4.0	1.4	0.1	0.0	0.0	0.0	0.0	0.3	2.2	7.2	29.6
Source 1: NOAA
Source 2: National Weather Service

== Demographics ==
Historical population
Census	Pop.	Note	%±
1870	600		—
1880	939		56.5%
1900	1,278		—
1910	1,193		−6.7%
1920	1,227		2.8%
1930	1,214		−1.1%
1940	1,447		19.2%
1950	1,399		−3.3%
1960	1,491		6.6%
1970	1,413		−5.2%
1980	1,478		4.6%
1990	1,530		3.5%
2000	1,426		−6.8%
2010	1,325		−7.1%
2020	1,322		−0.2%
U.S. Decennial Census

=== 2010 census ===
As of the census of 2010, there were 1,325 people, 603 households, and 361 families living in the city. The population density was 540.8 inhabitants per square mile (208.8/km^{2}). There were 675 housing units at an average density of 275.5 per square mile (106.4/km^{2}). The racial makeup of the city was 98.3% White, 0.2% African American, 0.2% Native American, 0.2% Asian, and 1.1% from two or more races. Hispanic or Latino of any race were 0.6% of the population.

There were 603 households, of which 24.9% had children under the age of 18 living with them, 47.3% were married couples living together, 8.6% had a female householder with no husband present, 4.0% had a male householder with no wife present, and 40.1% were non-families. 36.3% of all households were made up of individuals, and 16.6% had someone living alone who was 65 years of age or older. The average household size was 2.15 and the average family size was 2.79.

The median age in the city was 43.8 years. 21.4% of residents were under the age of 18; 7.4% were between the ages of 18 and 24; 22.5% were from 25 to 44; 28% were from 45 to 64; and 20.8% were 65 years of age or older. The gender makeup of the city was 49.4% male and 50.6% female.

=== 2000 census ===
As of the census of 2000, there were 1,426 people, 583 households, and 374 families living in the city. The population density was 606.3 inhabitants per square mile (234.1/km^{2}). There were 616 housing units at an average density of 261.9 per square mile (101.1/km^{2}). The racial makeup of the city was 98.95% White, 0.14% African American, 0.14% Native American, 0.14% Asian, 0.14% from other races, and 0.49% from two or more races. Hispanic or Latino of any race were 0.42% of the population.

There were 583 households, out of which 28.8% had children under the age of 18 living with them, 54.9% were married couples living together, 6.2% had a female householder with no husband present, and 35.8% were non-families. 32.9% of all households were made up of individuals, and 15.8% had someone living alone who was 65 years of age or older. The average household size was 2.28 and the average family size was 2.89.

In the city, the population was spread out, with 23.5% under the age of 18, 5.3% from 18 to 24, 26.2% from 25 to 44, 20.8% from 45 to 64, and 24.2% who were 65 years of age or older. The median age was 42 years. For every 100 females, there were 101.1 males. For every 100 females age 18 and over, there were 97.6 males.

The median income for a household in the city was $37,016, and the median income for a family was $50,234. Males had a median income of $30,463 versus $21,520 for females. The per capita income for the city was $18,578. About 4.3% of families and 8.3% of the population were below the poverty line, including 9.0% of those under age 18 and 15.0% of those age 65 or over.

== Trail connection ==
Preston is intersected by the Harmony-Preston Valley segment of the Blufflands State Trail.

== Education ==
- Fillmore Central School District (#2198) is a public school district that has two schools in Preston. Those schools are the Elementary (pre-kindergarten- fourth grade) and Middle Schools (fifth - sixth grade). The High School (seventh-twelfth grade) is located in nearby Harmony, Minnesota. For the school years of 2005–06, their enrollment is 641 students. Fillmore Central's predicted total enrollment is 604 students for the school years of 2006–07.
- The Preston Public Library is a member of Southeastern Libraries Cooperating, the Southeast Minnesota library region.

== Notable people ==
- John W. Hopp, Minnesota state senator
- Henry A. Larson, Minnesota state senator
