= Badger, Minnesota =

City in Minnesota, United States

- City
- Location of Badger, Minnesota
- Coordinates: 48°46′48″N 96°1′0″W
- Country: United States
- State: Minnesota
- County: Roseau

Area
  - Total: 1.34 sq mi (3.46 km^{2})
  - Land: 1.34 sq mi (3.46 km^{2})
  - Water: 0 sq mi (0.00 km^{2})
- Elevation: 1,079 ft (329 m)

Population (2020)
  - Total: 429
  - Density: 321.2/sq mi (124.02/km^{2})
- Time zone: UTC-6 (Central (CST))
  - Summer (DST): UTC-5 (CDT)
- ZIP code: 56714
- Area code: 218
- FIPS code: 27-03160
- GNIS feature ID: 0639556
- Website: https://badgermn.com/

Badger is a city in Skagen Township of Roseau County, Minnesota, United States. As of the 2020 census, Badger had a population of 429.

== History ==
A post office called Badger has been in operation since 1889. The city was named after nearby Badger Creek. Amos Henry Fikkan (1894-1968), businessman, pharmacist, and Minnesota state representative, lived in Badger.

== Geography ==
According to the United States Census Bureau, the city has a total area of 1.33 square miles (3.44 km^{2}), all land.

Badger is located along Minnesota State Highway 11.

== Demographics ==
Historical population
Census	Pop.	Note	%±
1900	164		—
1910	395		140.9%
1920	394		−0.3%
1930	325		−17.5%
1940	404		24.3%
1950	448		10.9%
1960	338		−24.6%
1970	327		−3.3%
1980	320		−2.1%
1990	381		19.1%
2000	470		23.4%
2010	375		−20.2%
2020	429		14.4%
U.S. Decennial Census

=== 2010 census ===
As of the census of 2010, there were 375 people, 181 households, and 103 families living in the city. The population density was 282.0 inhabitants per square mile (108.9/km^{2}). There were 235 housing units at an average density of 176.7 per square mile (68.2/km^{2}). The racial makeup of the city was 93.1% White, 0.3% African American, 1.1% Native American, 2.1% Asian, 1.1% from other races, and 2.4% from two or more races. Hispanic or Latino of any race were 1.1% of the population.

There were 181 households, of which 28.2% had children under the age of 18 living with them, 39.2% were married couples living together, 11.0% had a female householder with no husband present, 6.6% had a male householder with no wife present, and 43.1% were non-families. 37.0% of all households were made up of individuals, and 13.3% had someone living alone who was 65 years of age or older. The average household size was 2.07 and the average family size was 2.69.

The median age in the city was 42.8 years. 23.7% of residents were under the age of 18; 4.6% were between the ages of 18 and 24; 26.2% were from 25 to 44; 27.2% were from 45 to 64; and 18.4% were 65 years of age or older. The gender makeup of the city was 48.0% male and 52.0% female. The town's mayor is James Rinde.

=== 2000 census ===
As of the census of 2000, there were 470 people, 207 households, and 127 families living in the city. The population density was 352.9 inhabitants per square mile (136.3/km^{2}). There were 228 housing units at an average density of 171.2 per square mile (66.1/km^{2}). The racial makeup of the city was 100.00% White. Hispanic or Latino of any race were 0.21% of the population.

There were 207 households, out of which 34.8% had children under the age of 18 living with them, 43.0% were married couples living together, 14.0% had a female householder with no husband present, and 38.2% were non-families. 33.3% of all households were made up of individuals, and 16.9% had someone living alone who was 65 years of age or older. The average household size was 2.27 and the average family size was 2.90.

In the city, the population was spread out, with 28.1% under the age of 18, 10.4% from 18 to 24, 31.3% from 25 to 44, 16.0% from 45 to 64, and 14.3% who were 65 years of age or older. The median age was 33 years. For every 100 females, there were 90.3 males. For every 100 females age 18 and over, there were 85.7 males.

The median income for a household in the city was $30,234, and the median income for a family was $35,833. Males had a median income of $28,646 versus $23,594 for females. The per capita income for the city was $15,727. About 8.2% of families and 9.9% of the population were below the poverty line, including 11.7% of those under age 18 and 11.5% of those age 65 or over.
