= 71st Minnesota Legislature =

1979 and 1980 legislative sessions

Seventy-first Minnesota Legislature
←	70th Minnesota Legislature	72nd Minnesota Legislature	→
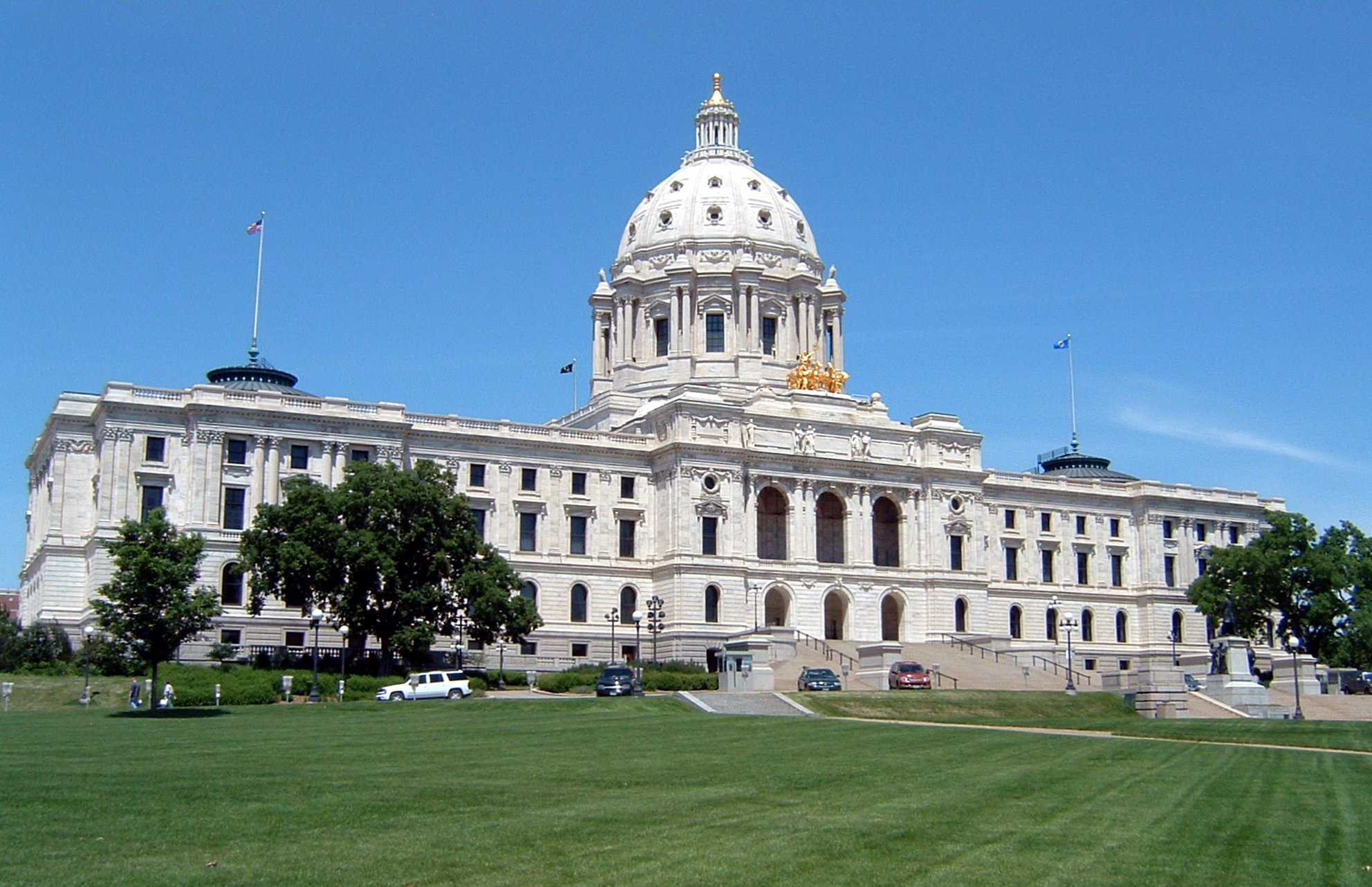

Overview
- Legislative body: Minnesota Legislature
- Jurisdiction: Minnesota, United States
- Meeting place: Minnesota State Capitol
- Term: January 3, 1979 – January 6, 1981
- Website: www.leg.state.mn.us

Minnesota State Senate
- Members: 67 Senators
- President: Edward J. Gearty
- Majority Leader: Nick Coleman
- Minority Leader: Robert O. Ashbach
- Party control: Democratic-Farmer-Labor Party

Minnesota House of Representatives
- Members: 134 Representatives
- Speaker: Rod Searle, Fred C. Norton
- Majority Leader: Jerry Knickerbocker, Irv Anderson
- Minority Leader: Rod Searle
- Party control: Democratic-Farmer-Labor Party

The seventy-first Minnesota Legislature first convened in the U.S. state of Minnesota on January 3, 1979. The 67 members of the Minnesota Senate were elected during the General Election of November 2, 1976, and the 134 members of the Minnesota House of Representatives were elected during the General Election of November 7, 1978.

The seventy-first legislature is noteworthy for the partisan composition of the House of Representatives. Until Bob Pavlak was unseated for unfair campaign practices, the House was equally divided between the DFL and the Independent-Republicans. Due to the tie, the DFL and the Independent-Republicans were forced to forge a compromise by which the Independent-Republicans were to elect the Speaker from among their own ranks, while the DFL would be given the chairmanship of, and one-vote majorities on, the rules and tax committees. This agreement was superseded for the 1980 continuation of the regular session, by which time the DFL had gained a slim majority in the House.

== Sessions ==
The legislature met in a regular session from January 3, 1979, to May 24, 1979. A special session was convened on May 24, 1979, to consider three bills regarding workers' compensation, energy, and transportation appropriations.

A continuation of the regular session was held between January 22, 1980, and April 12, 1980. No special sessions were held in 1980. The legislature met for a total of 99 legislative days during the 1979-80 biennium.

== Party summary ==
Resignations and new members are discussed in the "Membership changes" section, below.

=== Senate ===
	Party (Shading indicates majority caucus)		Total	Vacant
	DFL	IR	Total	Vacant
End of previous Legislature	47	20	67	0
Begin	47	20	67	0
April 25, 1979	46	20	66	1
July 9, 1979	47	20	67	0
August 1, 1979	46	20	66	1
November 12, 1979	47	20	67	0
November 26, 1979	46	20	66	1
January 16, 1980	46	21	67	0
January 20, 1980	45	21	66	1
February 28, 1980	45	22	67	0
May 1, 1980	44	22	66	1
July 1, 1980	44	21	65	2
Latest voting share	68%	32%		
Beginning of the next Legislature	45	22	67	0

=== House of Representatives ===
	Party (Shading indicates majority caucus)		Total	Vacant
	DFL	IR	Total	Vacant
End of previous Legislature	99	35	134	0
Begin	67	67	134	0
May 18, 1979	67	66	133	1
June 26, 1979	68	66	134	0
December 5, 1979	67	66	133	1
January 22, 1980	68	66	134	0
June 1, 1980	67	66	133	1
Latest voting share	50%	50%		
Beginning of the next Legislature	70	64	134	0

== Leadership ==
=== Senate ===
President of the Senate
Edward J. Gearty (DFL-Minneapolis)

Senate Majority Leader
Nick Coleman (DFL-St. Paul)

Senate Minority Leader
Robert O. Ashbach (IR-St. Paul)

=== House of Representatives ===
Speaker of the House (Note: Due to the fact that the DFL and the Independent-Republicans were evenly divided in the House when the seventy-first legislature convened, neither party could claim a majority and, instead, the two parties reached a compromise by which the Independent-Republicans would elect the Speaker from their own ranks, while the DFL would hold the chairmanship of, and one-vote majorities on, the rules and tax committees. The Independent-Republicans elected Rod Searle as Speaker.) (Note: When Bob Pavlak was expelled for unfair campaign practices, the DFL gained control of the House. In the process of selecting a Speaker, the DFL split into factions, with 26 DFLers supporting Fred C. Norton and 42 supporting Irv Anderson; however, 49 Independent-Republicans sided with the pro-Norton faction, and Norton became Speaker for the 1980 session.)
1979: Rod Searle (IR-Waseca)
1980: Fred C. Norton (DFL-St. Paul)

House Majority Leader (Note: Due to the fact that the House was evenly divided, the floor leaders of the DFL and Independent-Republican caucuses in the House—Irv Anderson and Jerry Knickerbocker, respectively—shared the role of Majority Leader during the 1979 sessions. In the 1980 session, Anderson was the sole Majority Leader.)
1979: Irv Anderson (DFL-International Falls) and Jerry Knickerbocker (IR-Minnetonka)
1980: Irv Anderson (DFL-International Falls)

House Minority Leader (Note: Since neither party held a majority in the House, and hence there was no minority, there was no House Minority Leader during the 1979 sessions.)
1979: None
1980: Rod Searle (IR-Waseca)

== Members ==
=== Senate ===
Name	District	City	Party
Anderson, Jerald C.	19	North Branch	DFL
Ashbach, Robert O.	48	St. Paul	IR
Bang, Otto T.	39	Edina	IR
Barrette, Emery G.	66	St. Paul	IR
Benedict, Robert M.	38	Bloomington	DFL
Bernhagen, John	22	Hutchinson	IR
Brataas, Nancy	33	Rochester	IR
Chenoweth, John C.	66	St. Paul	DFL
Chmielewski, Florian	14	Sturgeon Lake	DFL
Coleman, Nicholas D.	65	St. Paul	DFL
Davies, John T.	60	Minneapolis	DFL
Dieterich, Neil	62	St. Paul	DFL
Dunn, Robert G.	18	Princeton	IR
Engler, Steven	25	Randolph	IR
Frederick, Mel	32	West Concord	IR
Gearty, Edward J.	54	Minneapolis	DFL
Gunderson, Jerome O.	35	Mabel	DFL
Hanson, Marv	01	Hallock	DFL
Hughes, Jerome M.	50	Maplewood	DFL
Humphrey, Skip	44	New Hope	DFL
Jensen, Carl A.	28	Sleepy Eye	IR
Johnson, Doug	06	Tower	DFL
Keefe, John B.	40	Hopkins	IR
Keefe, Stephen	59	Minneapolis	DFL
Kirchner, William G.	37	Richfield	IR
Kleinbaum, Jack I.	17	St. Cloud	DFL
Knaak, Delores J.	49	White Bear Lake	IR
Knoll, Franklin J.	61	Minneapolis	DFL
Knutson, Howard A.	53	Burnsville	IR
Laufenburger, Roger A.	34	Lewiston	DFL
Lessard, Bob	03	International Falls	DFL
Lewis, B. Robert	41	Golden Valley	DFL
Luther, Bill	45	Brooklyn Park	DFL
McCutcheon, William W.	67	St. Paul	DFL
Menning, Mike	26	Edgerton	DFL
Merriam, Gene	47	Coon Rapids	DFL
Moe, Roger	02	Ada	DFL
Nelson, Tom A.	31	Austin	DFL
Nichols, James W.	20	Lake Benton	DFL
Ogdahl, Harmon T.	58	Minneapolis	IR
Olhoft, Wayne	11	Herman	DFL
Olson, Howard D.	27	St. James	DFL
Omann, Sr., Bernard P.	16	St. Joseph	IR
Penny, Tim	30	New Richland	DFL
Perpich, George F.	05	Chisholm	DFL
Peterson, Collin Clark	10	Detroit Lakes	DFL
Pillsbury, George Sturgis	42	Wayzata	IR
Purfeerst, Clarence	24	Faribault	DFL
Renneke, Earl	23	Le Sueur	IR
Rued, David E.	13	Aitkin	IR
Schaaf, David D.	46	Fridley	DFL
Schmitz, Robert J.	36	Jordan	DFL
Schrom, Ed	16	Albany	DFL
Setzepfandt, A. O.H.	21	Bird Island	DFL
Sieloff, Ron	63	St. Paul	IR
Sikorski, Gerry	51	Stillwater	DFL
Sillers, Douglas H.	09	Moorhead	IR
Solon, Sam	07	Duluth	DFL
Spear, Allan	57	Minneapolis	DFL
Staples, Emily Anne	43	Plymouth	DFL
Stern, Irving M.	41	St. Louis Park	DFL
Stokowski, Anne K.	55	Minneapolis	DFL
Stokowski, Eugene E.	55	Minneapolis	DFL
Strand, Roger Ernest	15	Cyrus	DFL
Stumpf, Jr., Peter P.	64	St. Paul	DFL
Tennessen, Robert J.	56	Minneapolis	DFL
Ueland, Arnulf	29	North Mankato	IR
Ulland, James E.	08	Duluth	IR
Vega, Conrad	52	South St. Paul	DFL
Wegener, Myrton O.	12	Bertha	DFL
Willet, Gerald	04	Park Rapids	DFL

=== House of Representatives ===
Name	District	City	Party
Aasness, Paul D.	11A	Wendell	IR
Adams, Leo G.	44B	New Hope	DFL
Ainley, Jr., John A.	04A	Park Rapids	IR
Albrecht, Raymond John	23A	Brownton	IR
Anderson, Bob	10B	Ottertail	IR
Anderson, Bruce W.	26A	Slayton	DFL
Anderson, Delbert F.	15A	Starbuck	IR
Anderson, Glen H.	15B	Bellingham	DFL
Anderson, Irvin N.	03A	International Falls	DFL
Battaglia, David Peter	06B	Two Harbors	DFL
Begich, Joseph	06A	Eveleth	DFL
Berglin, Linda Lee	59A	Minneapolis	DFL
Berkelman, Thomas R.	08B	Duluth	DFL
Biersdorf, John S.	32A	Owatonna	IR
Blatz, Kathleen	38A	Bloomington	IR
Brinkman, Bernard J.	16B	Richmond	DFL
Byrne, Margaret Mary	64B	St. Paul	DFL
Carlson, Doug	14A	Sandstone	IR
Carlson, Lyndon	44A	Crystal	DFL
Casserly, James R.	56A	Minneapolis	DFL
Clark, Janet H.	60A	Minneapolis	DFL
Clawson, John T.	19A	Center City	DFL
Corbid, John R.	01B	Oklee	DFL
Crandall, William A.	61A	Minneapolis	IR
Dean, William D.	58A	Minneapolis	IR
Dempsey, Terry	28B	New Ulm	IR
Den Ouden, Gaylin	21B	Prinsburg	IR
Drew, John	63B	St. Paul	IR
Eken, Willis	02B	Twin Valley	DFL
Elioff, Dominic J.	05A	Virginia	DFL
Ellingson, Robert L.	45B	Brooklyn Center	DFL
Enebo, Stanley A.	60B	Minneapolis	DFL
Erickson, Wendell O.	26B	Hills	IR
Esau, Gilbert D.	28A	Mountain Lake	IR
Evans, James	10A	Detroit Lakes	IR
Ewald, Douglas R.	40A	Minnetonka	IR
Faricy, Ray W.	63A	St. Paul	DFL
Fjoslien, David O.	11B	Brandon	IR
Forsythe, Mary	39A	Edina	IR
Friedrich, Donald L.	32B	Rochester	IR
Fritz, Michael D.	62B	St. Paul	IR
Fudro, Stanley J.	55A	Minneapolis	DFL
Greenfield, Lee	57B	Minneapolis	DFL
Halberg, Chuck	53B	Burnsville	IR
Haukoos, Bob	31A	Albert Lea	IR
Heap, Jim	43B	Robbinsdale	IR
Heinitz, Orlando Jacob	43A	Plymouth	IR
Hoberg, Dwaine	09A	Moorhead	IR
Hokanson, Shirley A.	37A	Richfield	DFL
Jacobs, Joel	47A	Coon Rapids	DFL
Jaros, Mike	07B	Duluth	DFL
Jennings, David M.	27B	Truman	IR
Johnson, Carl M.	23B	St. Peter	DFL
Johnson, Dean	21A	Willmar	IR
Jude, Tad	42A	Mound	DFL
Kahn, Phyllis	57A	Minneapolis	DFL
Kaley, John R.	33A	Rochester	IR
Kalis, Henry	30A	Walters	DFL
Kelly, Randy	66B	St. Paul	DFL
Kempe, Raymond J.	53A	West St. Paul	DFL
Knickerbocker, Jerry	40B	Minnetonka	IR
Kostohryz, Dick	50B	North St. Paul	DFL
Kroening, Carl W.	54A	Minneapolis	DFL
Laidig, Gary	51A	Stillwater	IR
Lehto, Arlene Ione	08A	Duluth	DFL
Kvam, Adolph Leonard	22A	Litchfield	IR
Levi, Connie	50A	Dellwood	IR
Long, Dee	56B	Minneapolis	DFL
Ludeman, Cal	20B	Tracy	IR
Luknic, Marsha Johnson	24B	Faribault	IR
Mann, George	27A	Windom	DFL
McCarron, Paul	46A	Spring Lake Park	DFL
McDonald, K. J.	36A	Watertown	IR
McEachern, Bob	18B	St. Michael	DFL
Mehrkens, Lyle	25B	Red Wing	IR
Metzen, James P.	52A	South St. Paul	DFL
Minne, Lona	05B	Hibbing	DFL
Moe, Donald M.	65B	St. Paul	DFL
Munger, Willard	07A	Duluth	DFL
Murphy, Mary	14B	Hermantown	DFL
Nelsen, Bruce G.	12A	Staples	IR
Nelsen, Marlin B.	13B	Aitkin	DFL
Nelson, Ken	59B	Minneapolis	DFL
Niehaus, Sr., Joseph T.	16A	Sauk Centre	IR
Norman, Jim	61B	Minneapolis	IR
Norton, Fred C.	65A	St. Paul	DFL
Novak, Steve	48A	New Brighton	DFL
Nysether, Myron E.	01A	Roseau	IR
Olsen, Sally	41A	Saint Louis Park	IR
Onnen, Tony	22B	Cokato	IR
Osthoff, C. Thomas	64A	St. Paul	DFL
Otis, Todd	58B	Minneapolis	DFL
Patton, Al W.	17A	Sartell	DFL
Pavlak, Sr., Robert L.	67A	St. Paul	IR
Pehler, James C.	17B	St. Cloud	DFL
Peterson, Bill	38B	Bloomington	IR
Peterson, Donna C.	60B	Minneapolis	DFL
Piepho, Mark J.	29A	Mankato	IR
Pleasant, Ray O.	39B	Bloomington	IR
Prahl, Norman Rudolph	03B	Grand Rapids	DFL
Redalen, Elton	35A	Fountain	IR
Reding, Leo John	31B	Austin	DFL
Rees, Tom	36B	Elko	IR
Reif, Robert W.	49B	White Bear Lake	IR
Rice, Jim	54B	Minneapolis	DFL
Rodriguez, Frank J.	67A	St. Paul	DFL
Rose, John	48B	Roseville	IR
Rothenberg, Elliot C.	41B	St. Louis Park	IR
Sarna, John	55B	Minneapolis	DFL
Schreiber, Bill	45A	Brooklyn Park	IR
Searle, Rodney Newell	30B	Waseca	IR
Searles, Robert L.	42B	Wayzata	IR
Sherwood, Glen A.	04B	Pine River	IR
Sieben, Harry A.	52B	Hastings	DFL
Sieben, Michael R.	51B	Newport	DFL
Simoneau, Wayne	46B	Fridley	DFL
Stadum, Tony	02A	Ada	IR
Stoa, Tom	34B	Winona	DFL
Stowell, Warren	34A	Lewiston	IR
Sviggum, Steve	25A	Kenyon	IR
Swanson, James C.	37B	Richfield	DFL
Thiede, Paul M.	13A	Pequot Lakes	IR
Tomlinson, John D.	67B	St. Paul	DFL
Valan, Merlyn Orville	09B	Moorhead	IR
Valento, Don	49A	Little Canada	IR
Vanasek, Robert	24A	New Prague	DFL
Voss, Gordon	47B	Blaine	DFL
Waldorf, Eugene T.	66A	St. Paul	DFL
Weaver, John L.	19B	Anoka	IR
Welch, Richard J.	18A	Cambridge	DFL
Welker, Ray	20A	Montevideo	IR
Wenzel, Steve	12B	Little Falls	DFL
Wieser, Jr., Al W.	35B	La Crescent	IR
Wigley, Richard E.	29B	Lake Crystal	IR
Wynia, Ann	62A	St. Paul	DFL
Zubay, Kenneth Peter	33B	Rochester	IR

== Membership changes ==
=== Senate ===
District	Vacated by	Reason for change	Successor	Date successor seated
41	B. Robert Lewis (DFL)	Died of a heart attack on April 25, 1979.	Irving M. Stern (DFL)	July 9, 1979
55	Eugene E. Stokowski (DFL)	Died of a heart attack on August 1, 1979.	Anne K. Stokowski (DFL) (Note: Anne K. Stokowski was the widow of Eugene E. Stokowski.)	November 12, 1979
66	John C. Chenoweth (DFL)	Resigned on November 26, 1979, to become the Director of the Minneapolis Municipal Employees Retirement Fund.	Emery G. Barrette (IR)	January 16, 1980
16	Ed Schrom (DFL)	Died on January 20, 1980.	Ben Omann (IR)	February 28, 1980
67	William W. McCutcheon (DFL)	Resigned on May 1, 1980, to accept appointment as Chief of the SPPD.	Remained vacant	
18	Robert G. Dunn (IR)	Resigned on July 1, 1980, to accept appointment as the Chair of the Minnesota Waste Management Board.	Remained vacant	

=== House of Representatives ===
District	Vacated by	Reason for change	Successor	Date successor seated
67A	Bob Pavlak (IR)	Expelled on May 18, 1979, on charges of unfair campaign practices.	Frank J. Rodriguez Sr. (DFL)	June 26, 1979
60B	Stanley A. Enebo (DFL)	Resigned on December 5, 1979, to become the Associate Director of the Minnesota Public Employees Retirement Association.	Donna C. Peterson (DFL)	January 22, 1980
44B	Leo G. Adams (DFL)	Resigned to accept appointment to the Minnesota Public Service Commission circa June 1, 1980.	Remained vacant	

== Notes ==
Preceded by Seventieth Minnesota Legislature	Seventy-first Minnesota Legislature; 1979—1980	Succeeded by Seventy-second Minnesota Legislature
