= Senator Stokowski =

Senator Stokowski may refer to:

- Anne K. Stokowski (1925–2020), Minnesota State Senate
- Eugene E. Stokowski (1921–1979), Minnesota State Senate
