= Kleinbaum =

Kleinbaum (lit. 'small tree') is a German surname. Notable people with the surname include:

- Jack I. Kleinbaum (1917–1988), American businessman and politician
- Nancy H. Kleinbaum (1948–2024), American writer and journalist
- Sharon Kleinbaum (born 1959), American rabbi
