= John Chenoweth =

John Chenoweth may refer to:

- John Chenoweth (Colorado politician)
- John Chenoweth (Minnesota politician)
