= Camilla Wicks =

American violinist (1928–2020)

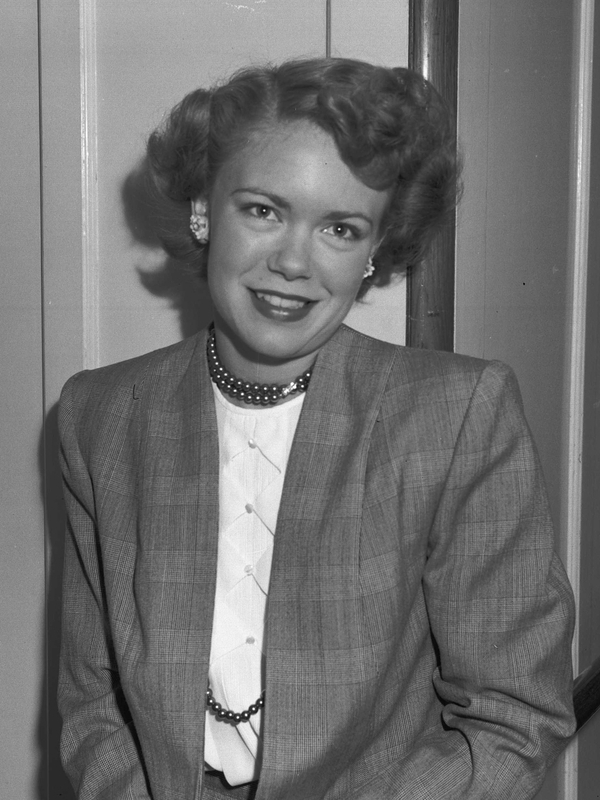
- Wicks in 1949

Background information
- Born: Camilla Dolores Wicks; August 9, 1928; Long Beach, California, U.S.
- Died: November 25, 2020 (aged 92) Weston, Florida, U.S.
- Genres: Classical
- Occupation: Violinist
- Instrument: Violin
- Years active: 1942–2005
- Labels: Capitol, Music & Arts, Biddulph, Simax

Camilla Dolores Wicks (August 9, 1928 – November 25, 2020) was an American violinist, and one of the first female violinists to establish a major international career. Her performing career included solo appearances with leading European and American symphony orchestras including the New York Philharmonic, Philadelphia Orchestra and Chicago Symphony Orchestra.

== Early life ==
Camilla Dolores Wicks was born in Long Beach, California. Her Norwegian-born father, Ingwald Wicks (Ingvald Kristian Eriksen Varhaugvik), was a distinguished violinist and teacher. Her pianist mother, Ruby (Dawson Stone) Wicks, studied with composer Xaver Scharwenka. Wicks made her name as a child prodigy, making her solo debut at age 7 with Mozart's Violin Concerto No. 4 at the Long Beach Municipal Auditorium. At 8, she performed Bruch's First Concerto and a year later Paganini's First Concerto. She went to study with Louis Persinger at the Juilliard School in New York City. In 1942, Persinger accompanied Wicks when she made her solo debut at age 13 with the New York Philharmonic.

== Career ==
In the next decade, Wicks performed regularly with many of the world's finest conductors (Walter, Reiner, Stokowski, Rodzinski, Ehrling) and orchestras. She went on extensive European tours and was quite popular in Scandinavia. Finnish composer Jean Sibelius greatly admired her interpretation of his concerto, of which she made a recording in 1952 for the Capitol label. She also made a number of recordings for His Master's Voice, Mercury and Philips.

Camilla Wicks explored a wide range of repertoire and promoted many lesser-known works, in particular by Scandinavian composers, who in turn wrote many works for her. Norwegian composer and violinist, Bjarne Brustad dedicated a number of solo violin works to her. Wicks was an advocate of contemporary Scandinavian composers: she performed concertos by Fartein Valen and Hilding Rosenberg, and gave the world premiere of those by Harald Saeverud and Klaus Egge. She also enjoyed a close collaboration with Ernest Bloch.

== Later years and death ==
Wicks married Robert Thomas in 1951. At the height of her career, she halted her career in order to raise her five children. Wicks later resumed her performing career intermittently and became a much sought-after teacher. She taught in a number of American faculties including Louisiana State University, the University of Michigan, and Rice University.

Wicks was invited to head the String Department at the Oslo Royal Academy in the early 1970s and was awarded a lifetime Professorship there. Many of the violinists of the leading Norwegian orchestras, including Henning Kraggerud, were among her former students. In 1999, she was made a Knight 1st Class of the Royal Norwegian Order of Merit for her contribution to music in that country. Wicks held the Isaac Stern Chair at the San Francisco Conservatory before retiring in 2005. Studio and concert recordings have been reissued on the Music & Arts, Biddulph and Simax labels.

Wicks died on November 25, 2020, at the age of 92. She had contracted COVID-19 in her final year, but had tested negative for COVID by the time of her death. Her marriage to Robert Thomas ended in divorce. Her survivors include three of her children, Angela Thomas Jeffrey, Erik Thomas and Lise-Marie Thomas Wertanzl, and three grandchildren. Two of her children pre-deceased her, Philip Thomas (deceased in 2011) and Paul Thomas (deceased in 2017).

== Selected recordings ==
- The Art of Camilla Wicks (Music & Arts CD 1160)
- Camilla Wicks Concertos by Sibelius, Valen and short pieces (Biddulph CD 80218)
- Camilla Wicks plays Concertos by Walton and Brustad (Simax CD PSC 1185)
- Camilla Wicks: Great Norwegian Performers 1945-2000 Vol. III (Simax CD PSC 1832)
- Camilla Wicks: Violin Concertos & Pieces (Profil CD PH18095)
