= James Swanson =

James Swanson may refer to:

- James C. Swanson (1934–2024), American educator and politician
- James L. Swanson (1959–2025), American author and historian
- James Swanson (racing driver) (born 1980), American stock car racing driver
