= Stokowski =

Stokowski (feminine: Stokowska, plural: Stokowscy) is a Polish-language surname. Notable people with the surname include:

- Anne K. Stokowski (1925–2020), American politician
- Eugene E. Stokowski (1921–1979), American politician
- Ferdynand Stokowski (1776–1827), Polish officer
- Kacper Stokowski (born 1999), Polish swimmer
- Leopold Stokowski (1882–1977), British-born American orchestral conductor
- Olga Samaroff Stokowski (1880–1948), American pianist, music critic, and teacher
- Margarete Stokowski (born 1986), German-Polish feminist writer
