= Donna C. Peterson =

American politician and educator

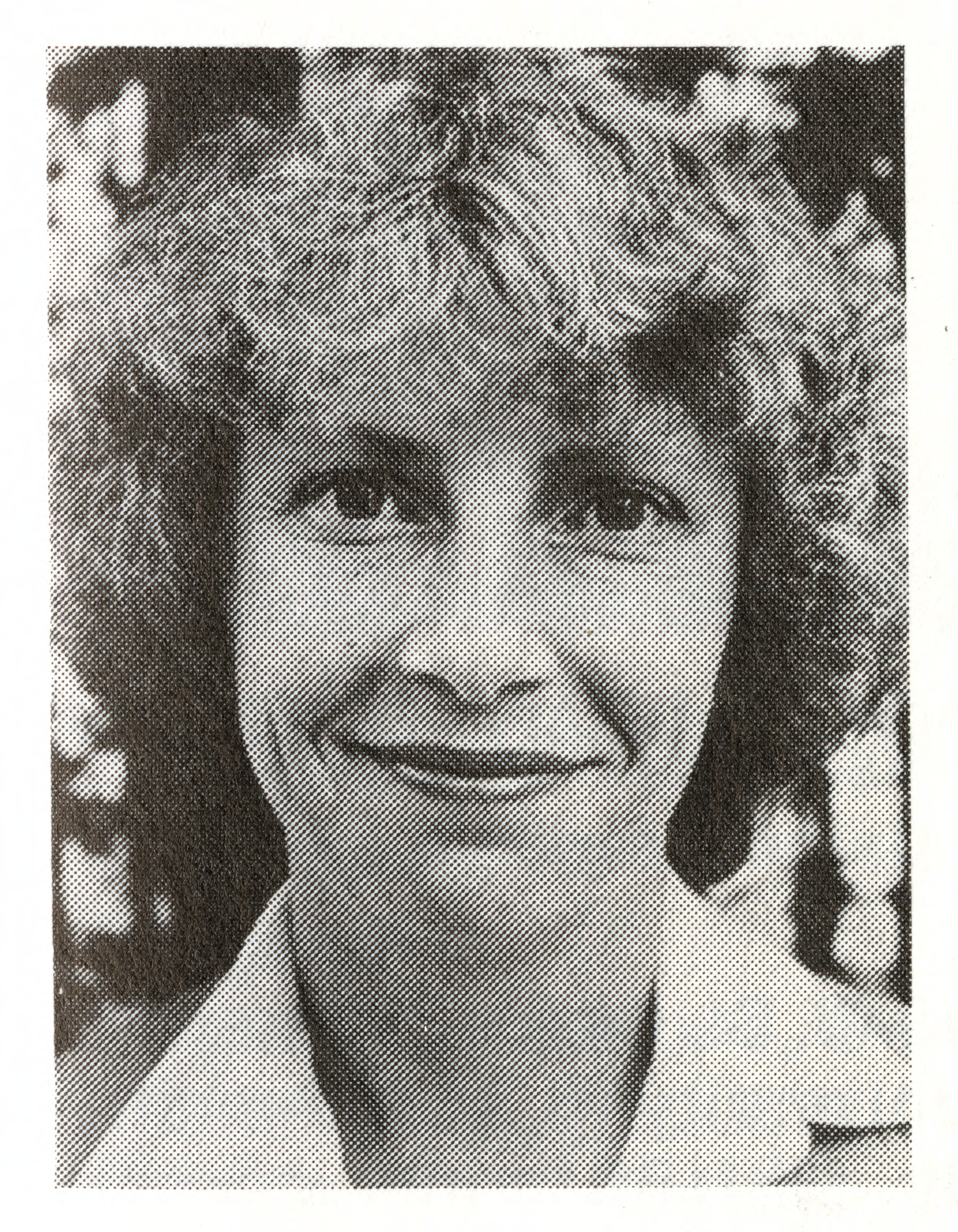

Member of the Minnesota Senate from the 61st district
- In office 1983–1990
- Preceded by: Franklin J. Knoll
- Succeeded by: Carol Flynn

Member of the Minnesota House of Representatives from the 60B district
- In office 1980–1982
- Preceded by: Stan Enebo
- Succeeded by: Janet H. Clark

Personal details
- Born: October 7, 1946 (age 79)
- Party: Democratic
- Children: 2
- Education: University of Minnesota (BA)

Donna C. Peterson (born October 7, 1946) is an American politician and educator.

Peterson lived in Minneapolis, Minnesota and received her Bachelor of Arts in anthropology from University of Minnesota. She served in the Minnesota House of Representatives from 1980 to 1982 and in the Minnesota Senate from 1983 to 1990 and was a Democrat. Peterson resigned in January 1990 to become a lobbyist for the University of Minnesota, where she would work until her retirement in 2011. She was the associate vice president for government and community relations at the time of her retirement.

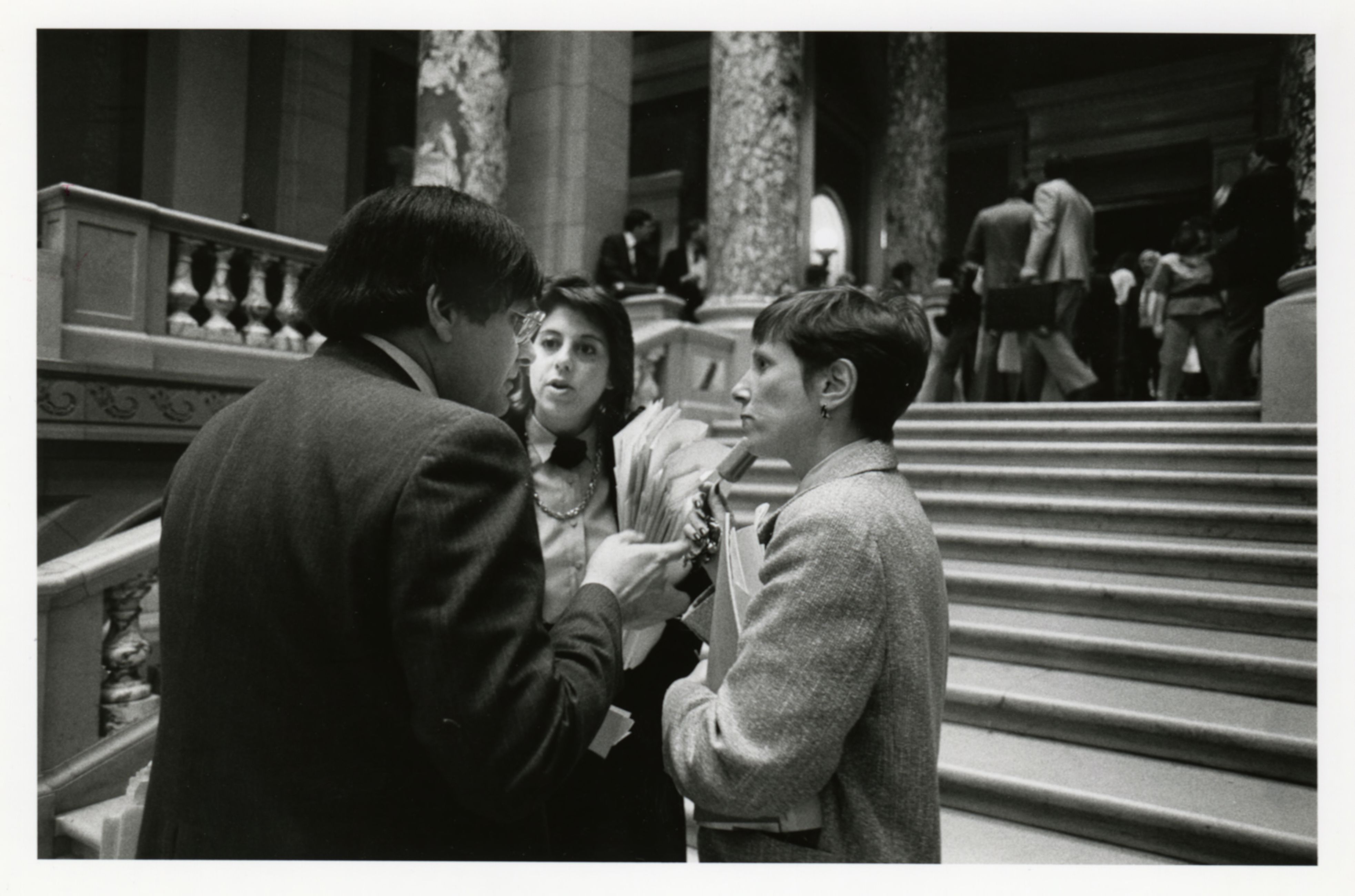
Senator Dick Cohen, Senator Ember Reichgott Junge and Senator Donna Peterson converse outside the Senate Chamber, St. Paul, Minnesota.
