= Senator Stern =

Senator Stern may refer to:

- Grace Mary Stern (1925–1998), Illinois State Senate
- Henry Stern (California politician) (born 1982), California State Senate
- Irving Stern (1928–2023), Minnesota State Senate

== See also ==
- Adolphus Sterne (1801–1852), Texas State Senate
- E. Donald Sterner (1894–1983), New Jersey State Senate
