= Marsha Johnson Luknic =

American politician and businesswoman

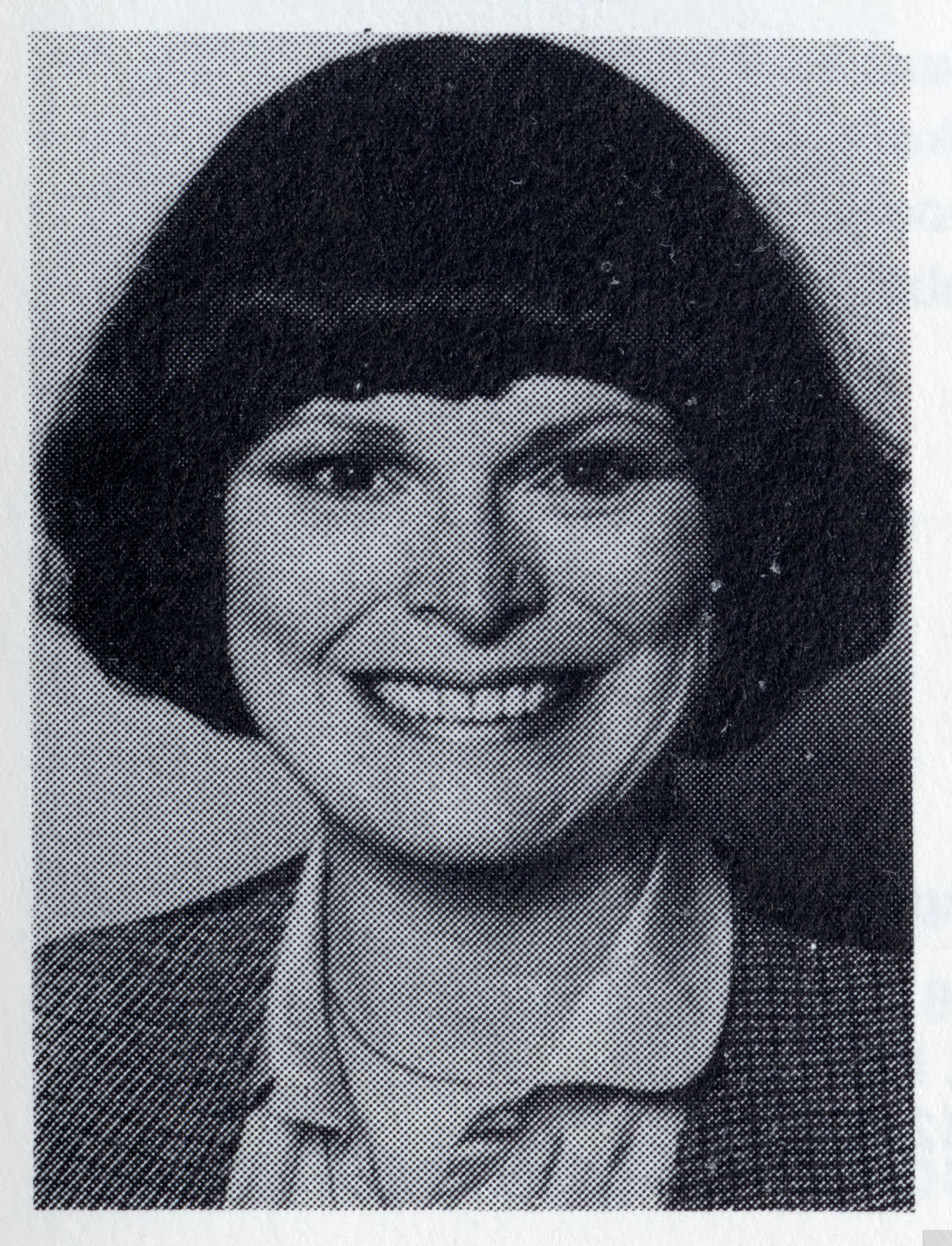

Member of the Minnesota House of Representatives from District 24B
- In office January 3, 1979 – January 3, 1983
- Preceded by: Orville E. Birnstihl
- Succeeded by: Richard E. Wigley

Personal details
- Born: July 30, 1943 Minneapolis, Minnesota, U.S.
- Died: August 22, 1992 (aged 49) Mason City, Iowa, U.S.
- Resting place: Brain hemorrhage
- Party: Republican
- Education: St. Olaf College; University of Colorado Boulder
- Profession: Politician, businesswoman

Marsha Ann "Marnie" Johnson Luknic (July 30, 1943 – August 22, 1992) was an American politician and businesswoman.

Born in Minneapolis, Minnesota, Luknic went to St. Olaf College and the University of Colorado Boulder. Luknic and her husband, Otto, owned an antique shop in Faribault, Minnesota. Together they had two children: Stephanie and Matthew. Johnson served on the Faribault Planning Commission and was a member of the Rice County Historical Society. From 1979 to 1982, during the 71st and 72nd legislative sessions, Luknic served in the Minnesota House of Representatives and was a Republican. Luknic died from a brain hemorrhage in a hospital in Mason City, Iowa.
