= Robert Joseph Faricy =

American politician (1856–1933)

Robert Joseph Faricy (May 9, 1856 – October 19, 1933) was an American politician and farmer.

Faricy was born in Credit River, Scott County, Minnesota in 1856. He was a farmer. Faricy served on the Credit River School Board and was the Credit River Township Assessor. Faricy served in the Minnesota House of Representatives from 1887 to 1890 and was a Democrat. In 1920, Faricy retired and moved to Saint Paul, Minnesota where he died. His grandson Ray W. Faricy also served in the Minnesota House of Representatives.
