= Lake Crystal (Blue Earth County, Minnesota) =

Lake in Minnesota, United States

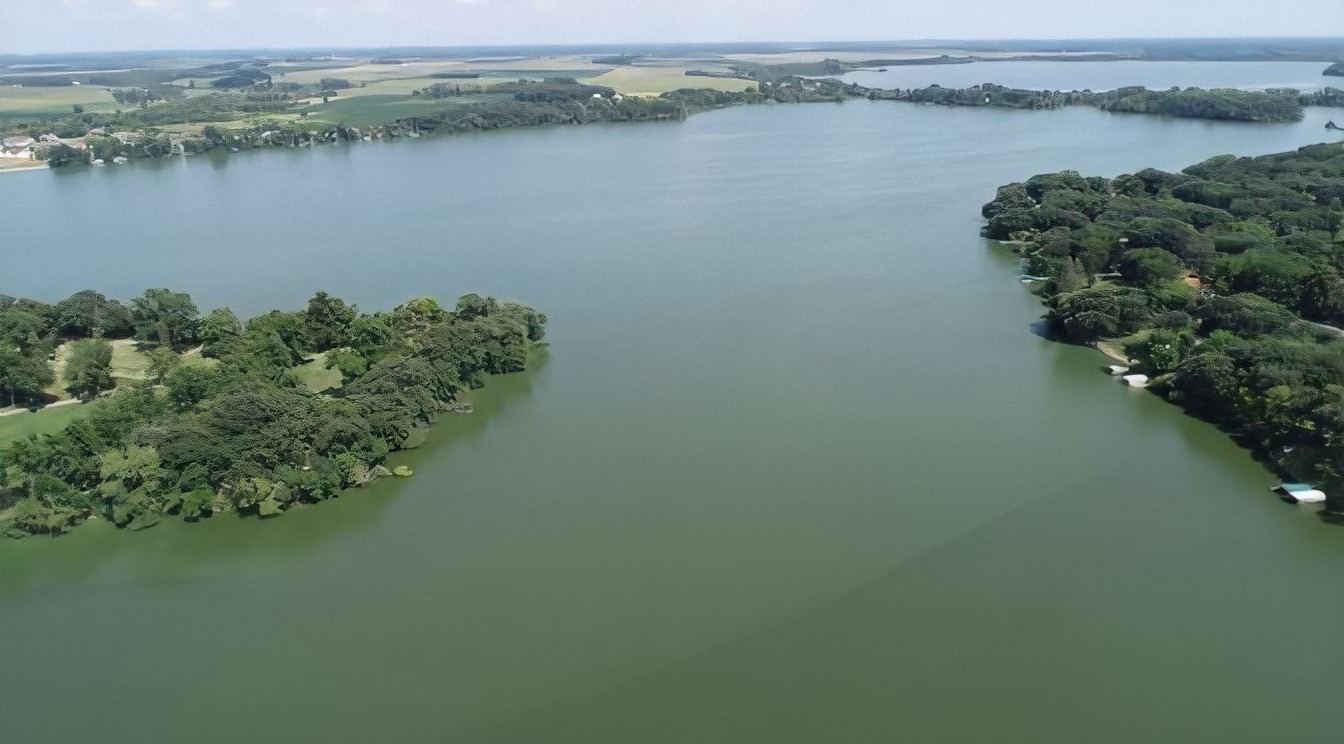
- Crystal Lake in 2016, viewed looking southeast

- Location within Minnesota
- Location: Blue Earth County, Minnesota
- Coordinates: 44°06′34″N 94°12′07″W
- Type: Glacial
- Basin countries: United States
- Surface elevation: 974 ft (297 m)
- Settlements: Lake Crystal

Lake Crystal is a lake in Blue Earth County, Minnesota, in the United States. The city of Lake Crystal, Minnesota is located near this lake.

== History and information ==
Lake Crystal was named after its crystal-clear water by John C. Fremont and J. N. Nicollet. Lake Crystal, also known as Crystal Lake, was the second lake that the founders of the town of Lake Crystal landed upon during their 1854 exploration. One such founder, William Riley Robinson, settled near the shore of Crystal Lake.

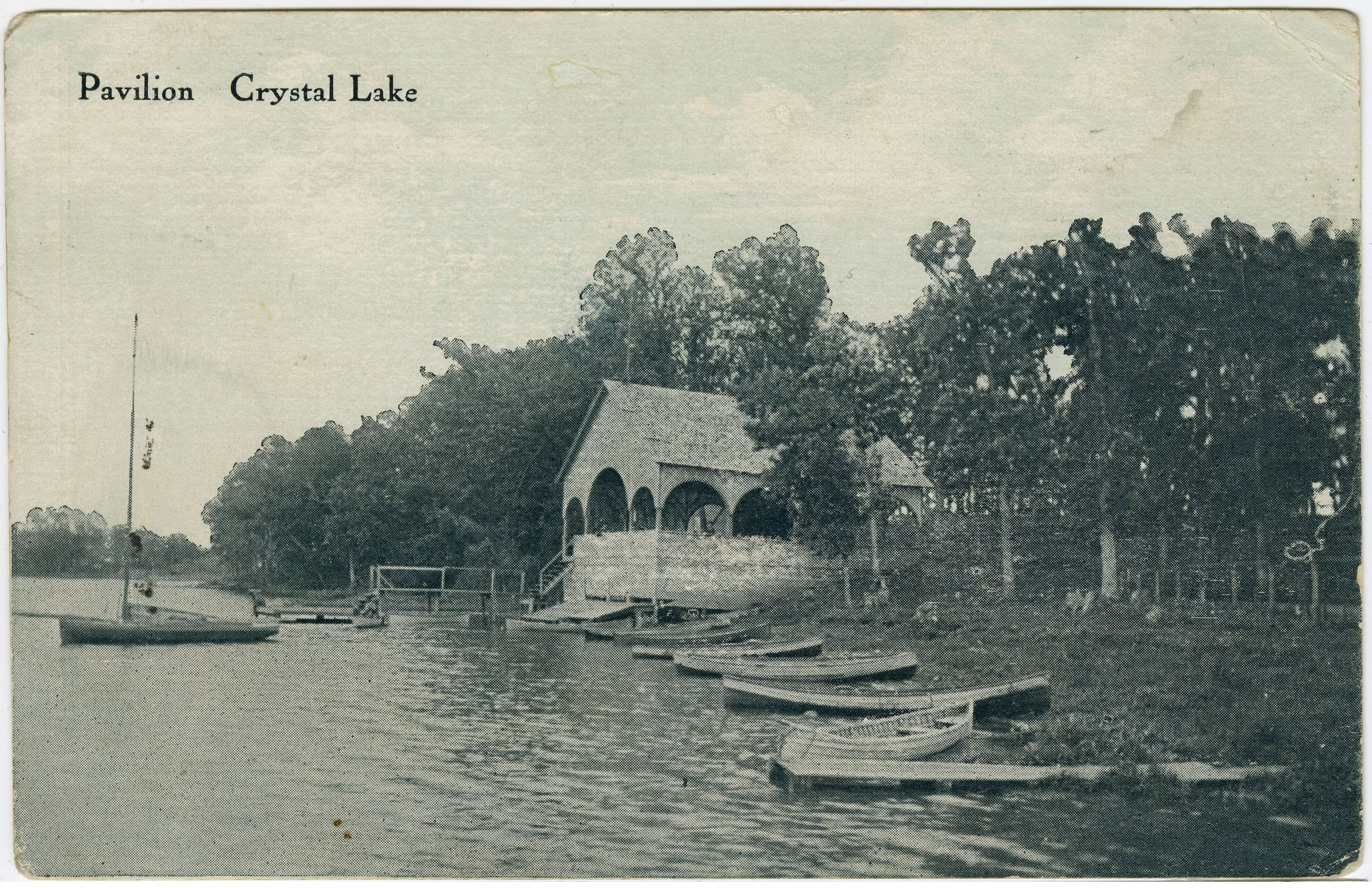
Pavilion at Lake Crystal, c. 1900. Blue Earth County Historical Society collection.

Crystal Lake throughout history has been the center of recreation, travel, and resources. In 1893 the Lake Crystal Boat Club built a pavilion at what is now Robinson Park, as well as launching a steamboat named the 'New Era' in the same year. The 'New Era' carried 25 passengers on daily, twenty-minute trips around the lake. The ship is believed to have sunk near the southwest shore of the lake. In the late 1800s to early 1900s, the harvesting and sale of ice from Crystal Lake was a major business.

Throughout Crystal Lake's history multiple land fill projects slowly polluted the lake, along with the nearby farming. The Crystal Waters Project is an organization that has cleaned not only Crystal Lake, but other Lake Crystal water systems as well. In 2013, 2014, and 2017, projects by the Crystal Waters Project restored the coastline of Robinson Park. In 2015, 97,000 pounds of carp were removed from Crystal Lake and surrounding bodies of water. Two floating filtration islands were launched into Crystal Lake to filter and clean the water. In 2019, Robinson Park was rededicated and a new fishing dock and erosion garden were added along the lake.

Crystal Lake is the largest of the three lakes near the town of Lake Crystal. Multiple Parks and natural areas are still located along the lake, including private landings and homes. The Lake Crystal Cemetery is located on a peninsula completely surrounded by Crystal Lake. The largest park on the lake is Robinson Park, which is one of the most popular parks in the town of Lake Crystal. Robinson Park includes a boat landing and a fishing pier.

== See also ==
- List of lakes in Minnesota
