= Adolph Kvam =

American politician

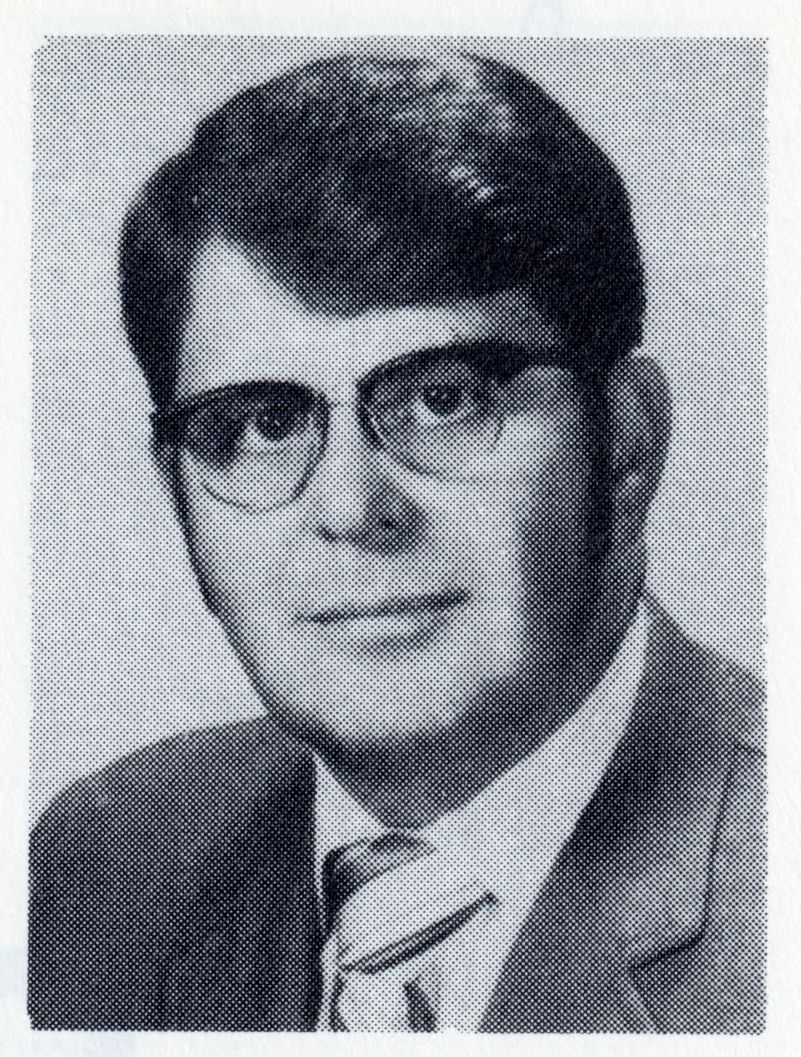

Member of the Minnesota House of Representatives from district 21A
- In office January 4, 1983 – January 5, 1987
- Preceded by: Dean Johnson
- Succeeded by: Steve Dille

Member of the Minnesota House of Representatives from district 22A
- In office January 2, 1973 – January 3, 1983
- Preceded by: Eugene Allison Smith
- Succeeded by: Robert O. McEachern

Member of the Minnesota House of Representatives from district 16B
- In office January 3, 1967 – January 1, 1973
- Preceded by: District created
- Succeeded by: Bernard Brinkman

Personal details
- Born: Adolph Leonard Kvam; November 30, 1917 Minneapolis, Minnesota
- Died: September 17, 2006 (aged 88) Bloomington, Minnesota
- Party: Republican

Adolph Leonard Kvam (November 30, 1917 – September 17, 2006) was an American politician who served in the Minnesota House of Representatives from 1967 to 1987.

Kvam was born in Minneapolis, Minnesota. He graduated from Willmar High School, in Willmar, Minnesota. During World War II he served in the U.S. Army Signal Corps in the China-Burma-India Theater. Kvam lived with his wife and family in Litchfield, Minnesota. Kvam was an automobile dealer in Litchfield, Minnesota. He served on the Litchfield City Planning Board and on the Litchfield School Board. He graduated from University of Minnesota with a degree in agriculture business and agricultural economics. He died on September 17, 2006, in Bloomington, Minnesota at the age of 88.
