= Walter J. Croswell =

American politician (1900–1991)

Walter John Croswell (March 31, 1900 – April 10, 1991) was an American farmer and politician.

Croswell was born in Luverne, Rock County, Minnesota. He went to the Mankato Public Schools and to the Iowa State University School of Agriculture. He lived in Lake Crystal, Blue Earth County, Minnesota with his wife and family and was a farmer. Croswell served in the Minnesota House of Representatives from 1949 to 1954.
