= Bernard Brinkman =

American politician (1926–2006)

Member of the Minnesota House of Representatives from district 16B
- In office January 2, 1973 – January 5, 1987
- Preceded by: Adolph Kvam
- Succeeded by: Jeff Bertram

Member of the Minnesota House of Representatives from district 26A
- In office January 3, 1967 – January 1, 1973
- Preceded by: District created
- Succeeded by: Verne Long

Member of the Minnesota House of Representatives from the 26th district
- In office January 5, 1965 – January 2, 1967
- Preceded by: John J. Kinzer
- Succeeded by: District abolished

Personal details
- Born: June 8, 1926 Farming, Minnesota
- Died: April 24, 2006 (aged 79) Paynesville, Minnesota
- Party: Democratic

Bernard Brinkman (June 8, 1926 – April 24, 2006) was an American politician who served in the Minnesota House of Representatives from 1965 to 1987.

He died of a heart attack on April 24, 2006, in Paynesville, Minnesota at age 79.
