= John Chenoweth (Minnesota politician) =

Minnesota politician

Member of the Minnesota Senate from the 66th district
- In office January 2, 1973 – November 26, 1979 (unfinished term)
- Preceded by: Roger Moe
- Succeeded by: Emery Barrette

Member of the Minnesota Senate from the 44th district
- In office January 5, 1971 – January 1, 1973
- Preceded by: Wendell Anderson
- Succeeded by: Skip Humphrey

Member of the Minnesota House of Representatives from the 44A district
- In office January 7, 1969 – January 4, 1971
- Preceded by: Emery Barrette
- Succeeded by: Bruce Vento

Personal details
- Born: John Craig Chenoweth; May 4, 1943 Saint Paul, Minnesota, U.S.
- Died: August 10, 1991 (aged 48) Minneapolis, Minnesota, U.S.
- Party: Democratic
- Spouse: Mary Sharon Naughton (m. 1969; div. 1977)
- Children: John
- Education: New York Institute of Finance; Saint Paul Seminary School of Divinity; Saint John's University attended John Carroll University attended William Mitchell College of Law
- Profession: Politician; official; law clerk

John Craig Chenoweth (May 4, 1943 – August 10, 1991) was a Minnesota politician, executive director of the Minneapolis Municipal Employees Retirement Fund, and a victim of an anti-gay hate crime. As a member of the Minnesota Democratic–Farmer–Labor Party, he served in the Minnesota State House (1969–1971) and Senate (1971–1979).

== Early life and career ==
John Craig Chenoweth was born in Saint Paul, Minnesota, on May 4, 1943. He was educated at the Johnson High School, New York Institute of Finance, Saint Paul Seminary School of Divinity at University of St. Thomas and Saint John's University. He also attended John Carroll University and William Mitchell College of Law, but did not graduate. Chenoweth served in the Minnesota House of Representatives from 1969 to 1971 and in the Minnesota Senate from 1971 to 1979. Before he was first elected, he was a Saint Paul Municipal Court law clerk and congressional campaign director. In November 1979, he resigned his term to become the executive director of the Minneapolis Municipal Employees Retirement Fund. He held the position until May 1990, when he resigned.

== Personal life ==
He was married to Mary Sharon Naughton from 1969 to 1977, by whom he had a son, John.

== Death ==
Chenoweth was murdered by gunshot on the beach (a gay hangout area at the time) in Minneapolis, on August 10, 1991. 19-year-old Cord Draszt was seriously wounded in the same shooting. The murderer, Jay Thomas Johnson, who was also gay, had shot and killed another gay man in Loring Park 11 days earlier, on July 31, 1991. The victim of that crime was 21-year-old Joel Larson.
