= Ray W. Faricy =

American lawyer

Raymond White Faricy Jr. (November 26, 1934 – November 1, 2025) was an American lawyer and politician.

Faricy lived in Saint Paul, Minnesota, with his wife and family, and graduated from Cretin High School in Saint Paul, Minnesota. Faricy received his bachelor's degree from the University of St. Thomas and his law degree from William Mitchell College of Law. He was admitted to the Minnesota bar. Faricy served in the Minnesota House of Representatives from 1971 to 1980 and was a Democrat. His grandfather Robert Joseph Faricy also served in the Minnesota Legislature.
