= B. Robert Lewis =

American veterinarian and politician

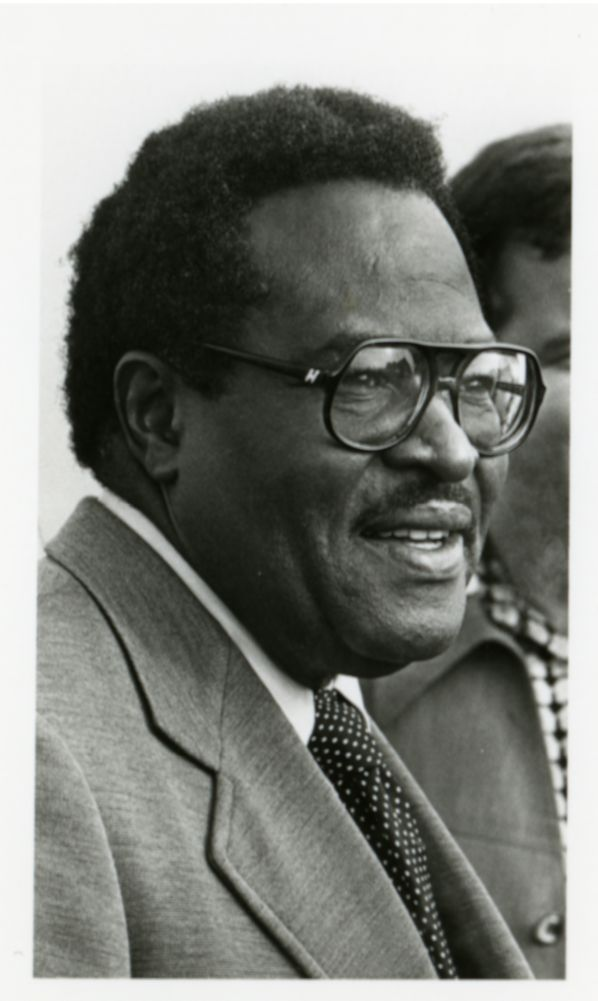
- Lewis at a committee hearing

Member of the Minnesota House of Representatives from the 41st district
- In office January 4, 1977 – April 25, 1979

Personal details
- Born: Bert Robert Lewis; November 11, 1931 Hutchinson, Kansas, U.S.
- Died: April 25, 1979 (aged 47) Golden Valley, Minnesota, U.S.
- Resting place: Lakewood Cemetery, Minneapolis, Minnesota, U.S.
- Party: Democratic (DFL)
- Spouse(s): Joanie Margaret Sandberg (m. 1976)
- Children: 2
- Education: Kansas State University (BS, DVM)
- Occupation: Politician, veterinarian

Military service
- Allegiance: United States
- Branch/service: United States Army
- Years of service: 1953–1955
- Battles/wars: Korean War

Bert Robert Lewis, Sr. (November 11, 1931 – April 25, 1979) was an American veterinarian and politician.

Lewis was born in Hutchinson, Kansas and was an African-American. He received his degrees in animal husbandry in 1953, biological science in 1958, and in veterinarian medicine in 1960 from Kansas State University. Lewis served in the United States Army during the Korean War. In 1962, Lewis moved to St. Louis Park, Minnesota and was a veterinarian. Lewis served on the St. Louis Park School Board from 1967 to 1971 and on the Minnesota Board of Education. Lewis served in the Minnesota Senate from 1973 until his death in 1979 and was a Democrat. He died from a heart attack at his home in Golden Valley, Minnesota. His body was laid in state at the Minnesota State Capitol.
