= Leo G. Adams =

American politician and engineer (born 1937)

Leo G. Adams (born September 11, 1937) is an American politician and mechanical engineer.

Adams lived in New Hope, Minnesota with his wife and family. He graduated from Minneapolis North High School, then received his bachelor's degree in mechanical engineering from the University of Minnesota. Adams also took graduate classes in business administration at the University of Minnesota. He served on the Minnesota State Board on Human Rights and on the Minnesota Public Service Commission. Adams served in the Minnesota House of Representatives from 1975 to 1980; when he resigned, when he was appointed to the Public Service Commission. Adams was a Democrat.
