= Ed Schrom =

American politician and farmer

Edward Joseph Schrom (March 17, 1911 – January 20, 1980) was an American politician and farmer.

Schrom was born in Albany, Minnesota, went to the Albany private and public schools, and was a farmer. Schrom served in the Minnesota Senate from 1971 until his death in 1980. He was a Democrat.
