= William W. McCutcheon =

American politician (1926–2020)

Member of the Minnesota Senate from the 43rd district
- In office 1971–1972

Member of the Minnesota Senate from the 80th district
- In office 1973–1980

Personal details
- Born: William Wallace McCutcheon; December 20, 1926 Hayward, Wisconsin, U.S.
- Died: June 17, 2020 (aged 93) Frisco, Texas, U.S.
- Party: Democratic (DFL)
- Spouse: Marlene
- Children: 4
- Education: University of Minnesota; FBI National Academy; Metropolitan State University
- Occupation: police officer

Military service
- Allegiance: United States
- Branch/service: United States Army

William Wallace McCutcheon (December 20, 1926 – June 17, 2020) was an American politician in the state of Minnesota. He served in the Minnesota Senate from 1971 to 1972 as a Democratic-Farmer-Labor member, representing district 43, and from 1973 to 1980 representing district 80. McCutcheon, a police officer, served as the Chief of the Saint Paul Police Department from 1980 to 1992. McCutcheon died on June 17, 2020, in Frisco, Texas.
