= Lake Crystal, Minnesota =

City in Minnesota, United States

Lake Crystal
- City
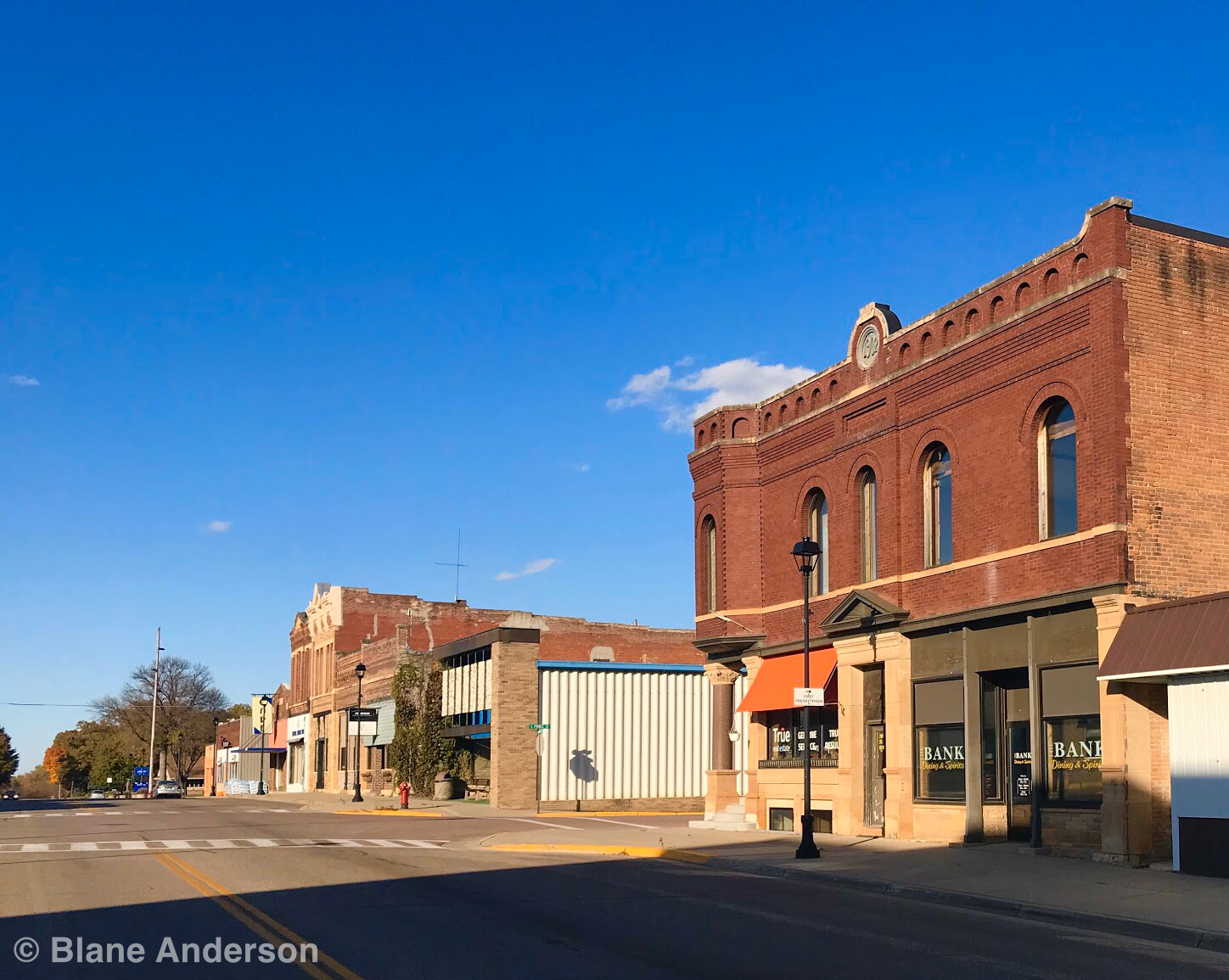
- Main Street in 2019
- Motto: "The Place To Be"
- Location of Lake Crystal, Minnesota
- Coordinates: 44°06′19″N 94°13′08″W
- Country: United States
- State: Minnesota
- County: Blue Earth

Government
  - Type: Mayor - Council

Area
  - Total: 1.71 sq mi (4.42 km^{2})
  - Land: 1.71 sq mi (4.42 km^{2})
  - Water: 0.0039 sq mi (0.01 km^{2})
- Elevation: 994 ft (303 m)

Population (2020)
  - Total: 2,539
  - Density: 1,488/sq mi (574.6/km^{2})
- Time zone: UTC-6 (Central (CST))
  - Summer (DST): UTC-5 (CDT)
- ZIP code: 56055
- Area code: 507
- FIPS code: 27-34190
- GNIS feature ID: 2395588
- Website: https://www.lakecrystalmn.org/

Lake Crystal is a city in Blue Earth County, Minnesota, United States, established in 1869. The population was 2,539 at the 2020 census. It is part of the Mankato, MN Metropolitan Statistical Area.

== History ==
=== First arrivals ===
In 1853, two families from small towns near Ithaca, New York, left their homes and traveled west. One was 32-year-old William Riley Robinson. In June 1854 Robinson and his companion Lucius O. Hunt traveled from Wisconsin to Blue Earth County. Robinson and Hunt arrived and came upon the three nearby lakes, Loon, Crystal, and Lily, and marveled at their beauty. They returned for their families and headed back to settle in the Lake Crystal area. The families were joined by two other men and their families, Calvin Webb and Samuel Thorne.

Robinson and his family settled in a log cabin on the south shore of Crystal Lake, a few feet south of where the Robinson House is today. Hunt and his family settled in a log cabin on the south shore of Lily Lake, where Holy Family Catholic Church is now. Each man took plots of land one mile long and half a mile wide (the dividing line being modern-day Main Street), the deeds to which were signed by President James Buchanan. Webb settled in the Judson Township, while Thorne took a claim on Crystal Lake.

During the Dakota War of 1862 the settlers escaped to the fort at Mankato. Eventually the Dakota uprising was subdued and the settlers returned and rebuilt their homes. Hunt built a brick house in 1869 that was torn down in the mid-1900s, where Holy Family Catholic Church is today. Robinson built his brick house in 1870, which still stands as a historical building on Robinson Street.

=== Town founding and 1800s ===
In June 1857, a town named Crystal Lake City was planned out on the southwest shore of Crystal Lake, but it failed to become reality. In October 1868, The Valley Railroad, later the Chicago, St. Paul, Minneapolis, & Omaha Railroad, was completed in the area. The railroad, after looking for potential locations, choose Lake Crystal for a new station. And so Lake Crystal began along the railroad, and was platted by Robinson and Hunt in 1869.

The railroads' engineer, General Judson W. Bishop of Saint Paul, named the town after nearby Crystal Lake. A post office began operation in Lake Crystal in 1869. By December 1, 1869, the town had a grain elevator, hotel, schoolhouse, grocery, drugstore, hardware store, two general stores, harness shop, cooper shop, and a doctor's office. Lake Crystal was incorporated as a city on February 24, 1870. Its first newspaper, The People's Journal, started in March 1870.

The period between 1870 and 1895 is generally known as the "Wheat Era" because most local farmers used nearly all their cropland for wheat. Lake Crystal's economy was adversely affected by the grasshopper invasion of 1873, when millions of grasshoppers devoured all the crops. The plague lasted until June 1877, when the grasshoppers fled. It took years to recover; only in 1882 were good quantities of wheat again marketed at the local grain elevator.

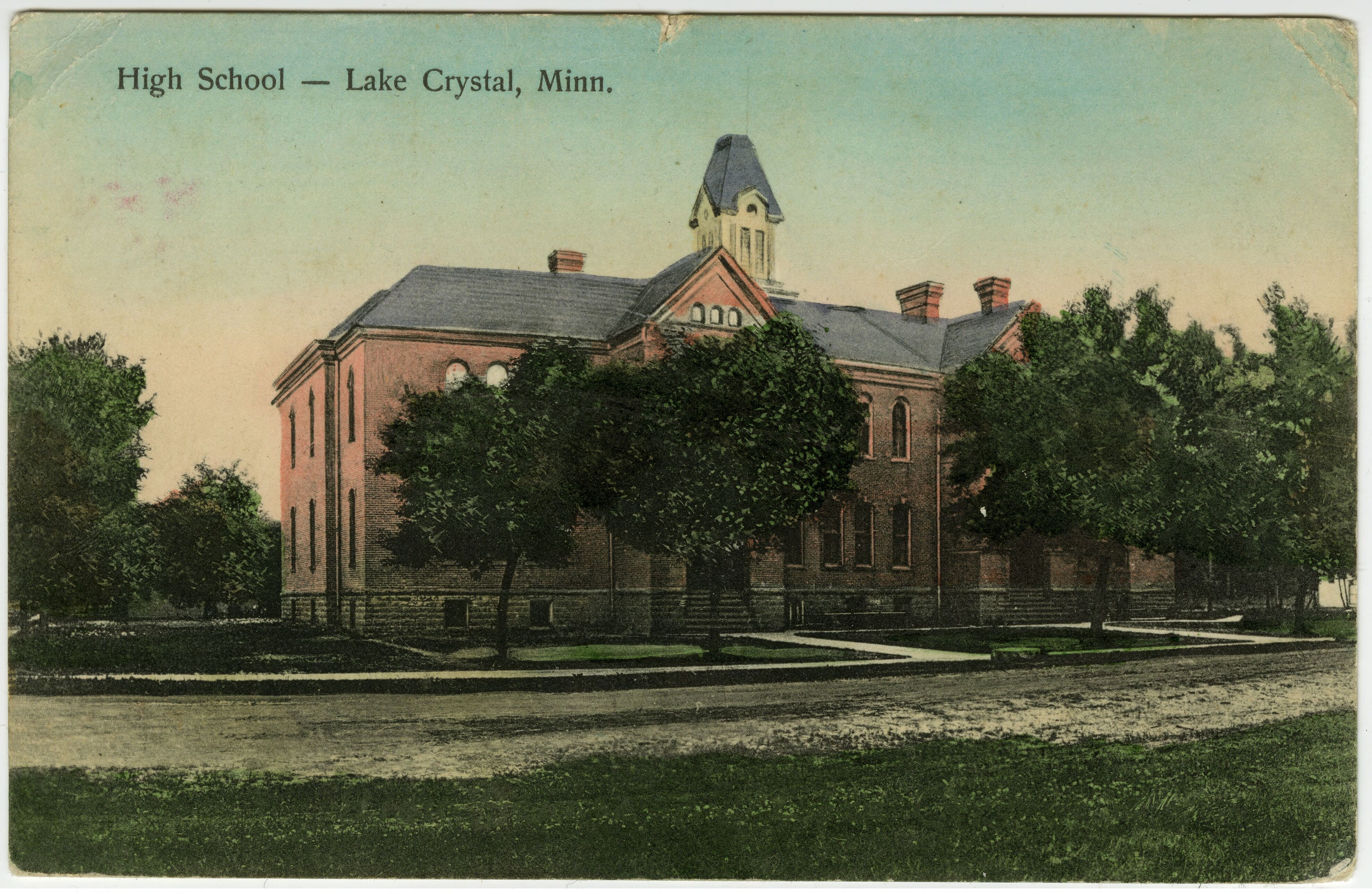
High School in Lake Crystal, c. 1905

In 1879, the Elmore railroad line was completed, with Lake Crystal as a junction between this line and the old main line. This rail line connected Lake Crystal to Garden City, Vernon Center, Amboy, Winnebago, Blue Earth, and Elmore. No fewer than 23 trains passed through town each day. In 1882, land was purchased from the railway for $100 and a new, two-story brick schoolhouse was built. This building was added onto in 1895 and 1905 and demolished in 1972.

In 1885, a 16-man volunteer fire department was founded to combat several outbreaks of fire in the area. On September 20, 1887, a fire broke out at 3AM in the town's business block. A man was seen pouring gasoline throughout one of the buildings, then lighting it. Within a few hours the fire was under control; it was extinguished with the help of Mankato's Fire Department. This fire damaged and destroyed about seven buildings. Also in 1887, All Angels Episcopal Church was built on the corner of Main and Howard Streets; it was torn down in 1964. In 1890 the United Methodist Church was built on the corner of Humphrey and Crystal Streets. In 1893 the Lake Crystal Boat Club built a boat pavilion at modern-day Robinson Park. The Boat Club also launched a steamship, the New Era, which is believed to have sunk near the lake's south shore.

Norwegian Lutherans built a church on the corner of Anna and Shepherd Streets in 1893, later renamed Zion Lutheran. In 1894, the Graif Brothers Flour Mill was built, which marketed flour to Iowa, Wisconsin, Illinois, and Glasgow, Scotland. By 1895 Lake Crystal had over 1,100 residents. In 1896, Catholics built their first church, on Humphrey Street. In 1898, space was made for a new electric light plant between the Graif Flour Mill main building and engine room. Power-line poles also arrived and were installed along 16 streets. Lake Crystal received electricity in December 1898. The Welsh Calvinistic Methodist Church was constructed in 1899 on the corner of Prince and Crystal Streets.

=== 1900s ===
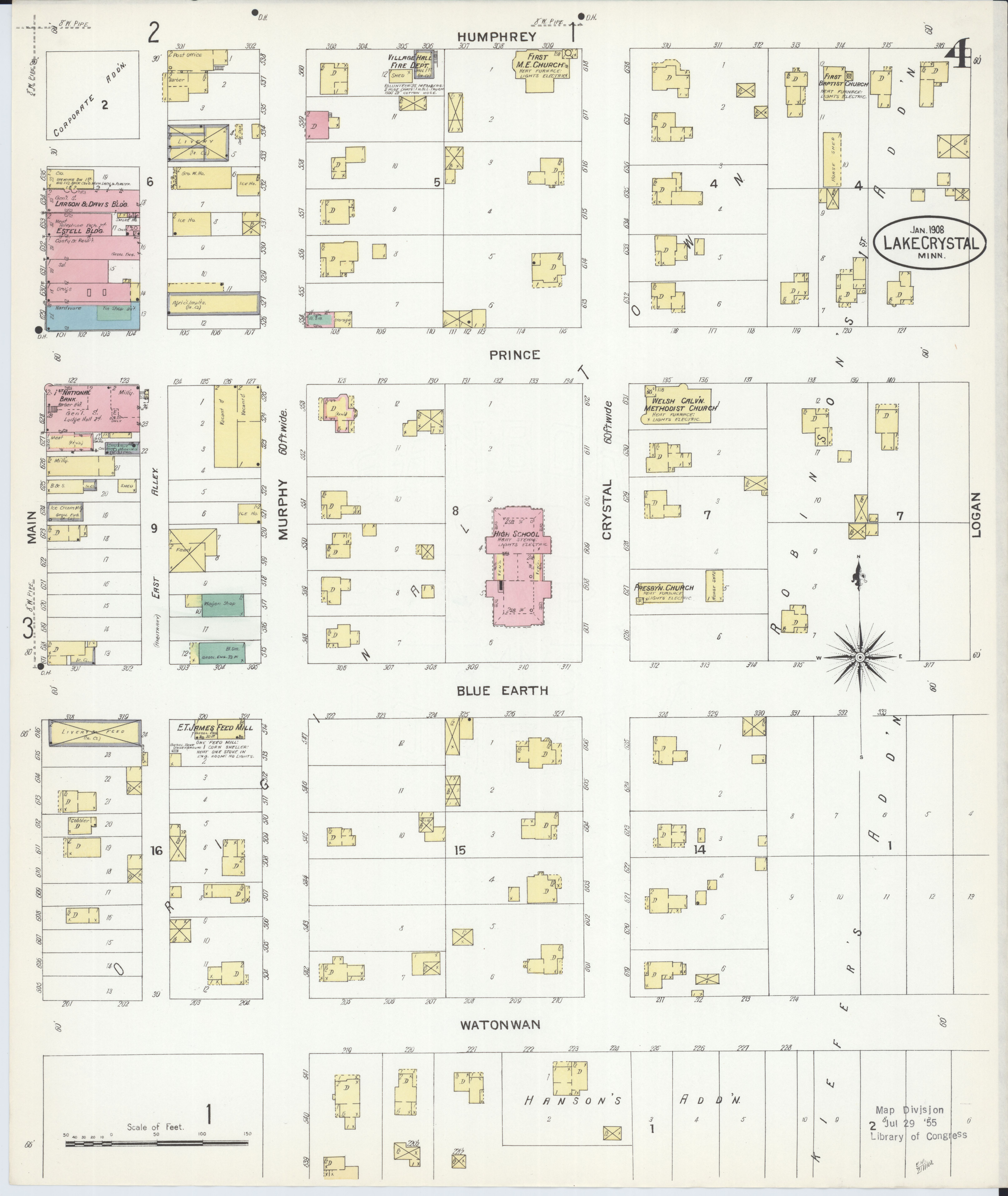
Map of Lake Crystal's business block on the east side of Main Street in January 1908, showing some of the major buildings, churches, and schoolhouse.

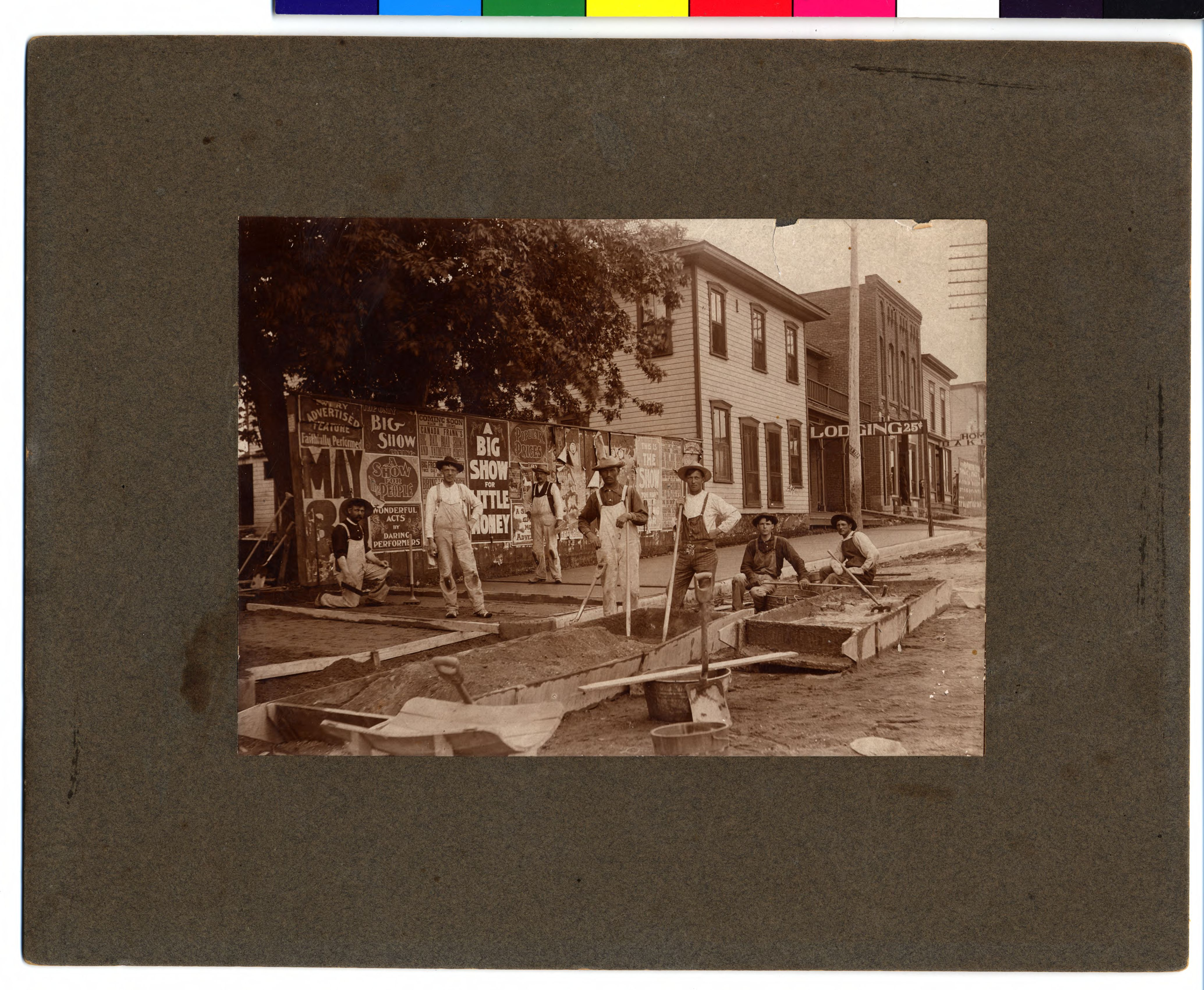
Making cement sidewalks, Lake Crystal, Minnesota

The Graif Brothers Flour Mill burned down in 1901 and was replaced in 1902 by the Lake Crystal Milling Company Plant, which was torn down in the late 1980s. The Lake Crystal First National Bank building was built in 1902 on Main Street, and held the bank until the 1920s. In 1905 the main railroad and depot in town was moved north to the south shore of Lily Lake, where the railroad resides today. In 1908, the first water tower was built, standing about 110 feet tall. It was torn down in 1995.

On October 10, 1919, the Lake Crystal American Legion John W. Roth Post 294 was established by 15 Lake Crystal World War I veterans. Also in 1919, Main Street was paved and the sewer system was reconditioned. The Lake Crystal Tribune began publishing weekly in December 1921. In 1926 a new hospital was built on Main Street, run by Fred Franchere. Also in 1926, a new school addition was added. It was demolished in 2007.

In 1937, the City Municipal Power Plant was built, and still provides power to the city today. On January 1, 1937, an accidental fire destroyed the Welsh Calvinistic Methodist Church. The present-day First Presbyterian Church was built in 1937 on the corner of Prince and Crystal Streets. The Minnesota Valley Gas Company began to serve the community in 1941. Trinity Lutheran Church was built in 1947 on the corner of Watonwan and Main Street.

The present-day Holy Family Catholic Church was built in 1951, replacing the Humphrey Street Catholic church. In 1954, another school addition was built, which was demolished in 2007. Zion Lutheran Church moved to its present site on the corner of Robinson and Crystal Street in 1957. In 1959, the Crystal CO OP elevator was built. It had 2,200,000 bushel grain bins added to it in the late 1960s to early 1970s.

Highway 60 was moved closer to the railroad and became a four-lane highway in 1968, replacing the old highway, also known as Lily Street. In 1970 a new post office was built on the corner of Prince and Main Street, which is still in use today. In 1971, an elementary school was built along County Road 9. In 1973 the Lake Crystal National Bank was moved from 101 South Main Street to a new building, which is now owned by MinnStar Bank. The city population reached 2,068 in 1978.

In the 1970s, three historic buildings were demolished on south Main Street and replaced by the Lake Crystal Towers, a five-story apartment building built in 1978. A new City Hall was built in 1980 in Marston Park, and was added onto in 2017. In 1983, Crystal Valley built a new, two-bin, concrete grain elevator. It added three larger bins in 1985, and is still in use today. Also in 1983, the Baptists moved from their Humphrey Street church to their present one on Oakland Street. A new wastewater treatment plant opened along County Road 20 North in 1987.

The Elmore Line was removed in the 1980s along with the many grain elevators along its path. A new Lake Crystal Fire Hall was built in 1988 on Hunt Street, replacing the Fire Hall at 101 North Main Street, which is now the police department. In 1995 a new water tower was built between Hunt and Lincoln Streets which was painted tan, and is still in use today. In the late 1990s to early 2000s, five historical buildings on Humphrey Street were demolished. In 1999 Crystal Gardens housing developments were constructed at the end of Blue Earth Street, which now houses 40 residences.

=== 2000s ===
A public recreation center was built on the corner of south Main Street and 510th Avenue in 2000. It contains a public pool, gymnasium, walking track, and exercise room. In the early 2000s the Lily Lake Estates, Crystal Creek, and Nathan Street housing developments began, or were under construction. POET Biorefining built a new ethanol plant about two miles west of town along Highway 60 in 2004. In 2005, multiple houses were demolished near the intersection of Main Street and Highway 60 and replaced by Kevin's Market Grocery Store. In 2007 a new secondary school was built along 510th Avenue to replace the old school on Murphy Street. Crystal Seasons Senior Living Center was built on the lot that belonged to the old Lake Crystal high school in 2008, replacing the retirement home off Highway 60 on LaClaire Street, which was demolished. United Methodist Church sold its building, and built a new one on the corner of Main Street and 510th Avenue, renaming it Cornerstone UMC in 2015. In recent years the Crystal Waters Project has cleaned up the nearby lakes that have been contaminated over several years by nearby farming and sludging. On August 8, 2016, a storm severely damaged the 57-year-old Crystal CO OP Elevator, which was demolished within the following months. The water tower was repainted light blue in 2018.

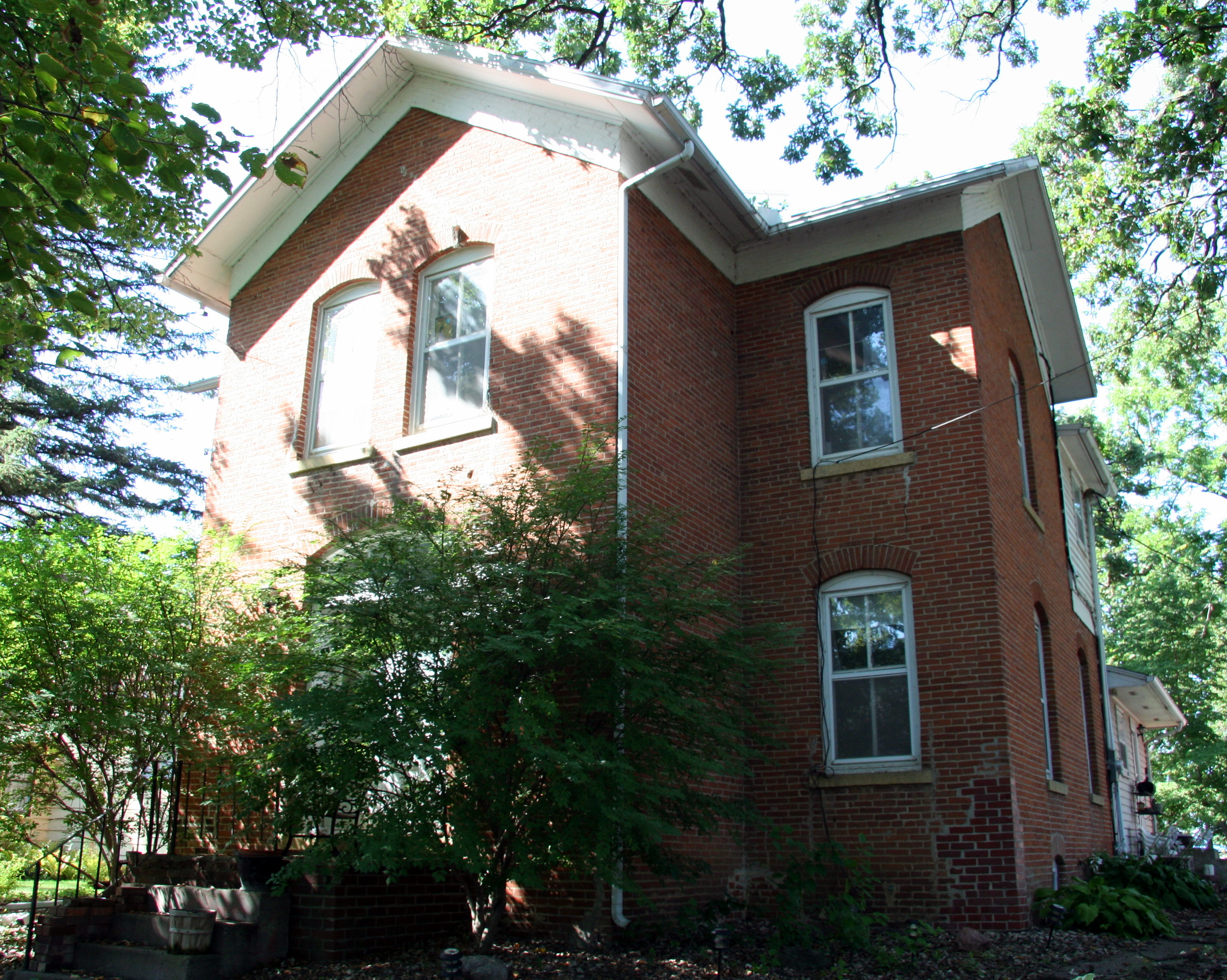
Historic Robinson House, built 1870

== Geography ==
According to the U.S. Census Bureau, the city has an area of 1.72 square miles (4.45 km^{2}), all land. There are four lakes near the city: Crystal Lake, Lily Lake, Mills Lake, and Loon Lake. Crystal Lake is the largest and sits in the center of town, providing access to a fishing pier, public landings, and warm and cold water sports. Loon Lake has public and private landings and access to cold and warm water fishing. Lily Lake is the smallest, and is good for canoeing and kayaking.

Minnesota State Highway 60 serves as a main route in the city.

== Demographics ==
Historical population
Census	Pop.	Note	%±
1870	360		—
1880	483		34.2%
1890	824		70.6%
1900	1,215		47.5%
1910	1,055		−13.2%
1920	1,204		14.1%
1930	1,173		−2.6%
1940	1,319		12.4%
1950	1,430		8.4%
1960	1,652		15.5%
1970	1,807		9.4%
1980	2,078		15.0%
1990	2,084		0.3%
2000	2,420		16.1%
2010	2,549		5.3%
2020	2,539		−0.4%
U.S. Decennial Census; 2020 Census

=== 2020 census ===
As of the 2020 census, Lake Crystal had a population of 2,539. The median age was 38.3 years. 26.5% of residents were under the age of 18 and 17.8% of residents were 65 years of age or older. For every 100 females there were 97.1 males, and for every 100 females age 18 and over there were 95.8 males age 18 and over.

0.0% of residents lived in urban areas, while 100.0% lived in rural areas.

There were 1,038 households in Lake Crystal, of which 32.8% had children under the age of 18 living in them. Of all households, 50.0% were married-couple households, 18.0% were households with a male householder and no spouse or partner present, and 23.5% were households with a female householder and no spouse or partner present. About 30.8% of all households were made up of individuals and 13.1% had someone living alone who was 65 years of age or older.

There were 1,093 housing units, of which 5.0% were vacant. The homeowner vacancy rate was 1.3% and the rental vacancy rate was 4.3%.

Racial composition as of the 2020 census
Race	Number	Percent
White	2,373	93.5%
Black or African American	27	1.1%
American Indian and Alaska Native	4	0.2%
Asian	6	0.2%
Native Hawaiian and Other Pacific Islander	0	0.0%
Some other race	17	0.7%
Two or more races	112	4.4%
Hispanic or Latino (of any race)	96	3.8%

=== 2010 census ===
As of the census of 2010, there were 2,549 people, 1,063 households, and 661 families living in the city. The population density was 1,482.0 inhabitants per square mile (572.2/km^{2}). There were 1,143 housing units at an average density of 664.5 per square mile (256.6/km^{2}). The racial makeup of the city was 97.3% White, 0.8% African American, 0.2% Native American, 0.7% Asian, 0.1% Pacific Islander, 0.2% from other races, and 0.7% from two or more races. Hispanic or Latino of any race were 1.3% of the population.

There were 1,063 households, of which 33.3% had children under the age of 18 living with them, 50.0% were married couples living together, 8.5% had a female householder with no husband present, 3.8% had a male householder with no wife present, and 37.8% were non-families. 31.7% of all households were made up of individuals, and 13.5% had someone living alone who was 65 years of age or older. The average household size was 2.40 and the average family size was 3.03.

The median age in the city was 35.6. 26.8% of residents were under the age of 18; 6.5% were between the ages of 18 and 24; 27.9% were from 25 to 44; 25.2% were from 45 to 64; and 13.5% were 65 years of age or older. The gender makeup of the city was 47.9% male and 52.1% female.

=== 2000 census ===
As of the census of 2000, there were 2,420 people, 940 households, and 652 families living in the city. The population density was 1,361.3 inhabitants per square mile (525.6/km^{2}). There were 973 housing units at an average density of 547.3 per square mile (211.3/km^{2}). The racial makeup of the city was 97.98% White, 0.29% African American, 0.45% Native American, 0.29% Asian, 0.04% Pacific Islander, 0.45% from other races, and 0.50% from two or more races. Hispanic or Latino of any race were 0.74% of the population.

There were 940 households, out of which 34.8% had children under the age of 18 living with them, 57.8% were married couples living together, 8.3% had a female householder with no husband present, and 30.6% were non-families. 26.4% of all households were made up of individuals, and 14.8% had someone living alone who was 65 years of age or older. The average household size was 2.52 and the average family size was 3.05.

In the city, the population was spread out, with 27.4% under the age of 18, 7.9% from 18 to 24, 28.3% from 25 to 44, 18.9% from 45 to 64, and 17.4% who were 65 years of age or older. The median age was 35. For every 100 females, there were 97.2 males.

The median income for a household in the city was $39,912, and the median income for a family was $47,143. Males had a median income of $31,970 versus $21,548 for females. The per capita income for the city was $17,454. About 4.5% of families and 5.4% of the population were below the poverty line, including 6.8% of those under age 18 and 8.2% of those age 65 or over.

== Politics ==
Presidential election results

2020 Precinct Results Spreadsheet2016 Precinct Results Spreadsheet2012 Precinct Results Spreadsheet2008 Precinct Results Spreadsheet2004 Precinct Results Spreadsheet2000 Precinct Results Spreadsheet1996 Precinct Results1992 Precinct Results1988 Precinct Results1984 Precinct Results1980 Precinct Results1976 Precinct Results1968 Precinct Results1964 Precinct Results1960 Precinct Results
Year	Republican	Democratic	Third parties
2020	49.5% 690	47.1% 657	3.4% 48
2016	48.3% 608	41.8% 527	9.9% 125
2012	42.1% 553	54.6% 717	3.3% 43
2008	40.5% 535	57.3% 757	2.2% 28
2004	47.1% 646	51.1% 702	1.8% 25
2000	45.5% 566	47.1% 586	7.4% 92
1996	33.8% 367	52.9% 575	13.3% 144
1992	33.6% 336	43.5% 435	22.9% 230
1988	48.8% 474	51.2% 498	0.0% 0
1984	56.9% 605	43.1% 458	0.0% 0
1980	51.9% 563	38.1% 413	10.0% 109
1976	48.1% 481	50.2% 502	1.7% 17
1968	51.4% 416	46.0% 372	2.6% 21
1964	44.7% 371	55.3% 459	0.0% 0
1960	71.1% 609	28.7% 246	0.2% 2

== Notable people ==
- Walter J. Croswell (1900-1991), farmer and Minnesota state legislator, lived on a farm in Lake Crystal
- David Oppegaard, novelist (born 1979), was born in Lake Crystal.
- Richard E. Wigley (1918-1998), farmer and Minnesota state legislator, lived on a farm in Lake Crystal.
