= Delbert F. Anderson =

American politician

- Born: Delbert F. Anderson; June 30, 1919; Ray, North Dakota, U.S.
- Died: May 3, 1999 (aged 79)
- Education: University of Minnesota; Gustavus Adolphus College
- Occupations: Politician; Farmer
- Notable work: He served in the Minnesota House of Representatives from 1953 to 1960.; He also served as the clerk for the township board and as the clerk for the school board.

Delbert F. Anderson (June 30, 1919 – May 3, 1999) was an American politician and farmer.

Anderson was born in Ray, North Dakota. He went to the Pope County, Minnesota schools. Anderson then graduated from the Glenwood High School in Glenwood, Minnesota in 1937. Anderson went to the West Central School of Agriculture and Morris Agricultural School in Morris, Minnesota. He also went to University of Minnesota and Gustavus Adolphus College. Anderson lived in Starbuck, Minnesota with his wife and family and was a farmer. Anderson served in the Minnesota House of Representatives from 1953 to 1960, from 1967 to 1974, and from 1977 to 1980. He also served as the clerk for the township board and as the clerk for the school board. Anderson died from kidney failure at the Glenwood Retirement Village in Glenwood, Minnesota.
