= Eugene Allison Smith =

American politician (1922–1980)

Member of the Minnesota House of Representatives from the 22A district
- In office January 5, 1971 – January 1, 1973

Personal details
- Born: October 17, 1922 Montevideo, Minnesota, U.S.
- Died: March 23, 1980 (aged 57) Peoria, Illinois, U.S.
- Cause of death: Heart attack
- Resting place: Sunset Memorial Cemetery
- Spouse: Lois Berdahl (m. 1946)
- Children: 4
- Education: University of Minnesota; St. Olaf College
- Profession: Politician, farmer

Military service
- Allegiance: United States
- Branch/service: United States Army Air Forces
- Years of service: 1942–1946
- Battles/wars: World War II

Eugene Allison Smith (October 17, 1922 – March 23, 1980) was an American politician and farmer.

Smith was born in Montevideo, Minnesota and graduated from Montevideo High School in 1940. He went to the University of Minnesota and St. Olaf College. Smith served in the United States Army Air Force during World War II. He was a farmer and lived in Montevideo, Minnesota with his wife and family. Smith served in the Minnesota House of Representatives in 1971 and 1972 and was on the Montevideo Library Board. Smith died at a hospital in Peoria, Illinois after suffering a heart attack; he was performing with the Gay Nineties Quartet in Peoria, Illinois.
