= Janet H. Clark =

American politician

Janet H. Clark Entzel
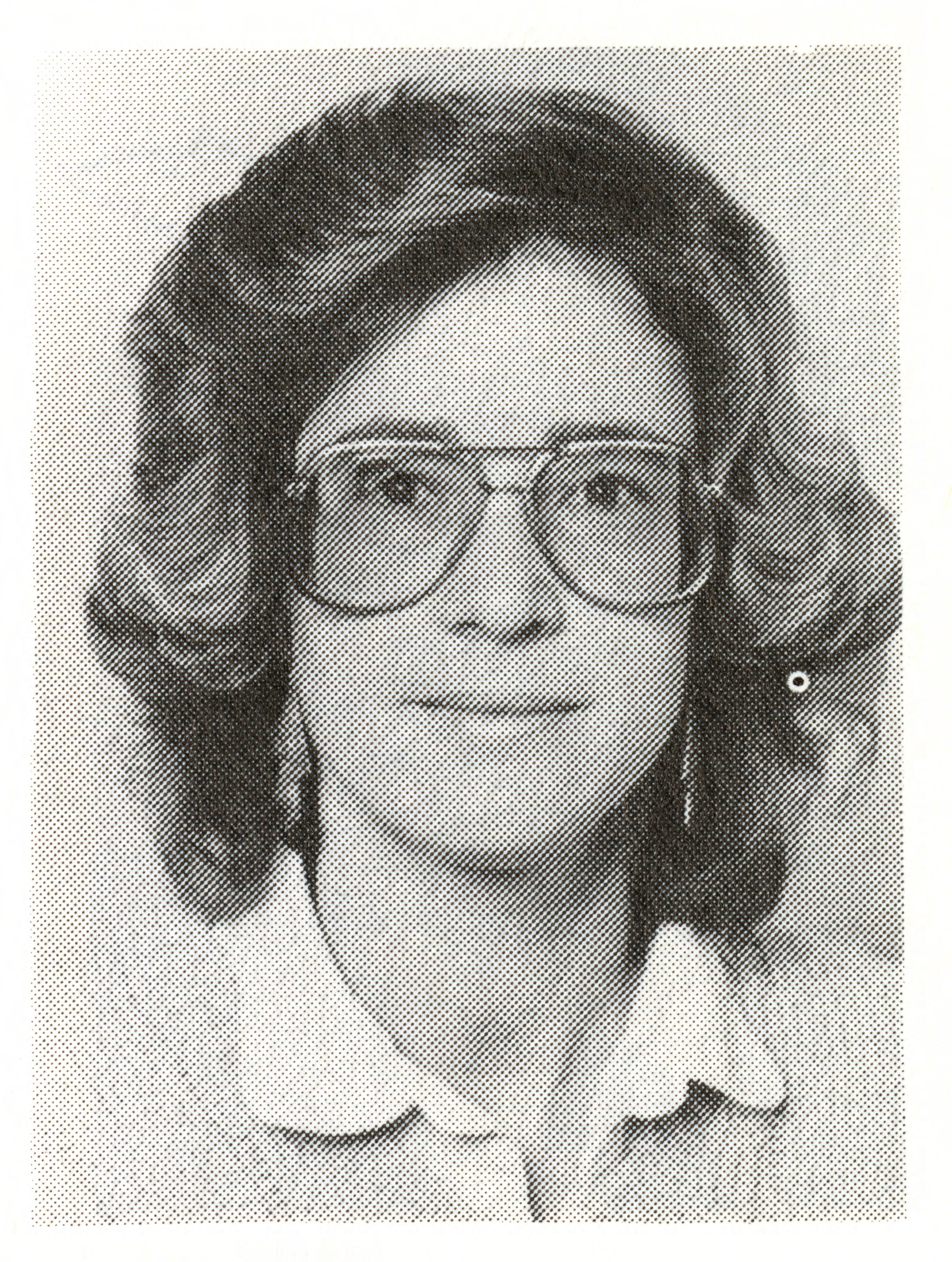
- Born: June 13, 1941 (age 85); Freeport, Illinois, U.S.
- Education: Westminster College (B.A.); University of Minnesota (graduate work)
- Occupations: Former politician; educator; author
- Known for: Service in the Minnesota House of Representatives
- Notable work: Aka McGuire (novel)
- Political party: Democratic

Janet H. Clark Entzel (born June 13, 1941) is an American former politician.

== Biography ==
Clark was born in Freeport, Illinois, and graduated from Burley High School in Burley, Idaho. She graduated from Westminster College, in Salt Lake City, Utah, with a bachelor's degree in education and music. Clark went to University of Minnesota for graduate work. Clark moved to Minneapolis, Minnesota in 1963. Clark was a teacher and owned a daycare center for children. She also worked for the Minnesota Education Council and the Minnesota Department of Corrections. Clark served in the Minnesota House of Representatives from 1975 to 1984 and was a Democrat.

Janet Clark Entzel is the author of a murder mystery novel, Aka McGuire. She lived with her husband in Coon Rapids, Minnesota.
