= Jack I. Kleinbaum =

American businessman and politician

Member of the Minnesota Senate from the 17th district
- In office January 1, 1973 – January 4, 1981

Member of the Minnesota House of Representatives from the 51A district
- In office January 2, 1967 – December 31, 1972

Member of the St. Cloud City Council
- In office 1960–1964

Personal details
- Born: February 26, 1917 Minneapolis, Minnesota, U.S.
- Died: August 3, 1988 (aged 71) St. Cloud, Minnesota, U.S.
- Party: Democratic (DFL)
- Spouse: Violet B.
- Children: 4
- Occupation: Politician, businessman

Jack I. Kleinbaum (February 26, 1917 – August 3, 1988) was an American businessman and politician.

Kleinbaum was born in Minneapolis, Minnesota, and attended the Minneapolis vocational high school. During World War II, he worked in the Seattle-Tacoma shipyard. In 1947, he and his family moved to St. Cloud, Minnesota, where he owned and managed Jack's Outlet Stores, Inc. Kleinbaum served on the St. Cloud City Council from 1960 to 1964. In 1964, he ran for mayor of St. Cloud and lost by 43 votes. Kleinbaum served three terms each in the Minnesota House of Representatives as a Democrat from 1967 to 1972 and the Minnesota Senate from 1973 to 1980. Although he was Jewish, an uncommon religion in St. Cloud, he won elections in a city and legislative districts with a large Catholic electorate. He died at St. Cloud Hospital after suffering heart problems and other ailments. Funeral services were held at a Catholic church and he was buried in a Jewish cemetery in Richfield, Minnesota.
