= Irving Stern =

American politician (1928–2023)

Member of the Minnesota Senate from the 41st district
- In office 1979–1982

Personal details
- Born: November 6, 1928 Milwaukee, Wisconsin, U.S.
- Died: February 3, 2023 (aged 94) Yuma, Arizona, U.S.
- Party: Minnesota Democratic–Farmer–Labor Party
- Education: Roosevelt University
- Occupation: businessman

Irving Melvin Stern (November 6, 1928 – February 3, 2023) was an American politician in the state of Minnesota. He served in the Minnesota Senate from 1979 to 1982 as a Minnesota Democratic–Farmer–Labor Party member, representing district 41. Stern previously served as mayor of St. Louis Park, Minnesota from 1977 to 1979.

Stern died in Yuma, Arizona, on February 3, 2023, at the age of 94.
