= Emery G. Barrette =

American politician

Member of the Minnesota House of Representatives
- In office 1967–1968

Member of the Minnesota Senate
- In office 1979–1980

Member of the Saint Paul School Board
- In office 1970–1980

Personal details
- Born: June 30, 1930 Saint Paul, Minnesota
- Died: April 4, 1993 (aged 62) Stillwater, Minnesota
- Party: Republican
- Education: Hamline University, Drew University, Luther Seminary
- Occupation: Minister, Politician

Emery G. Barrette (June 30, 1930 – April 4, 1993) was an American United Methodist Church minister and politician.

Barrette was born in Saint Paul, Minnesota and graduated from Johnson High School in Saint Paul. He graduated from Hamline University in 1954 and from Drew University in 1954. Barrette also went to Luther Seminary. He served as a minister for the United Methodist Church in Minnesota. Barrette served on the Saint Paul School Board from 1970 to 1980 and was a Republican. Barrette served in the Minnesota House of Representatives in 1967 and 1968 and in the Minnesota Senate in 1979 and 1980. He died from cancer at his home in Stillwater, Minnesota.
