= James C. Swanson =

American educator and politician (1934–2024)

James C. Swanson (April 4, 1934 – August 2, 2024) was an American educator and politician.

Swanson was born in Minneapolis, Minnesota and graduated from Minnehaha Academy. He went to Dunwoody Technical Institute (now Dunwoody College of Technology). Swanson also graduated from University of Minnesota with an industrial arts education degree. He lived in Richfield, Minnesota and was an instructor at the Hennepin Technical Center. Swanson served in the Minnesota House of Representatives from 1969 to 1984 and was a Democrat.

Swanson died on August 2, 2024, at the age of 90.
