= Richard E. Wigley =

American politician (1918–1998)

Richard Wigley
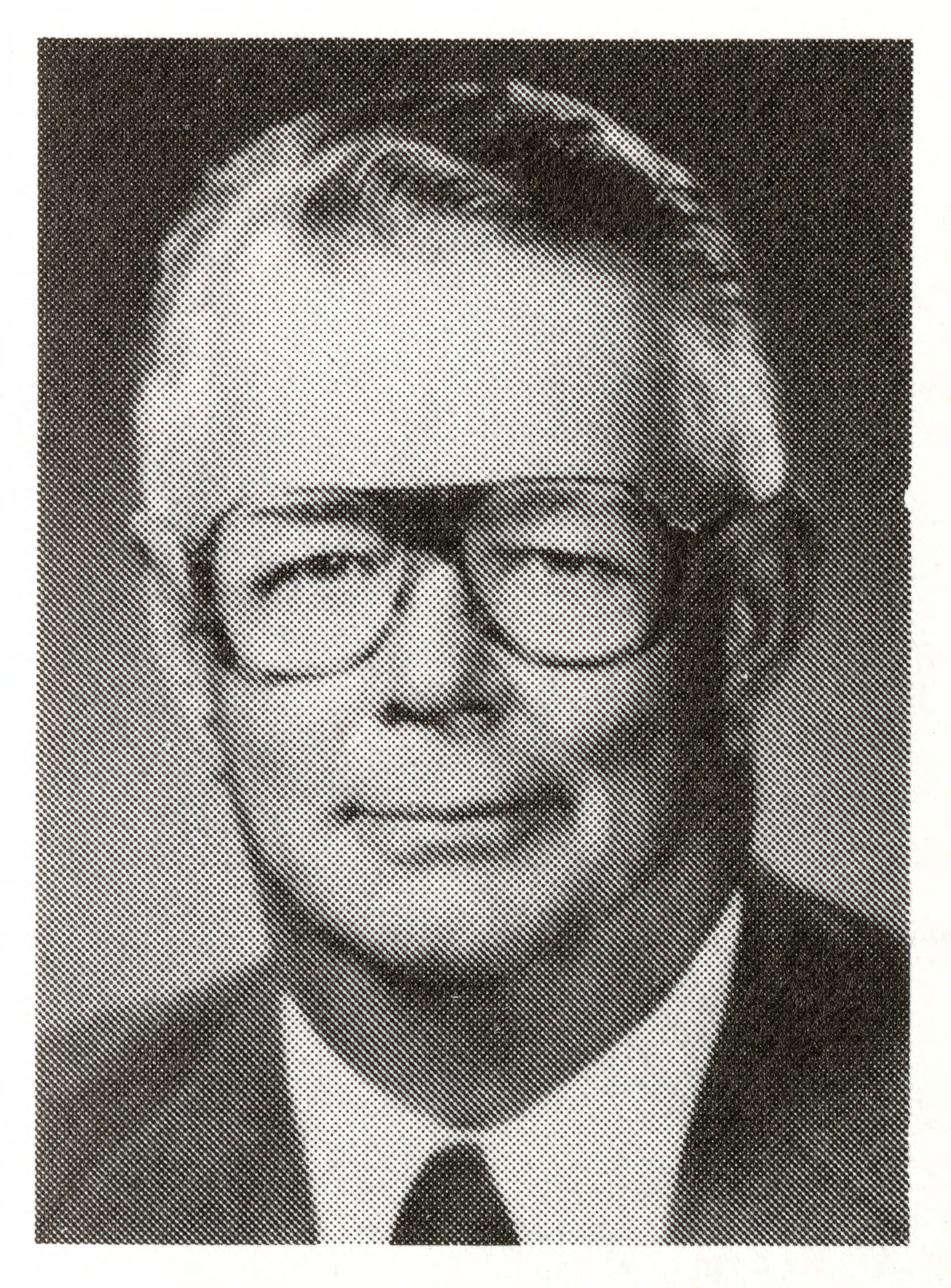

Member of the Minnesota House of Representatives
- In office January 4, 1971 – January 6, 1985
- Governor: Wendell R. Anderson; Rudy Perpich; Al Quie; Rudy Perpich

Personal details
- Born: October 23, 1918 Judson Township, Minnesota, U.S.
- Died: April 22, 1998 (aged 79) Lake Crystal, Minnesota, U.S.
- Resting place: Minneopa Cemetery, South Bend Township, Minnesota, U.S.
- Other political affiliations: Independent Republican
- Education: University of Minnesota
- Nickname: Dick

Richard "Dick" E. Wigley (October 23, 1918 – April 22, 1998) was an American politician and farmer.

Wigley was born in Judson Township, Blue Earth County, Minnesota. He graduated from the Mankato High School, in Mankato, Minnesota and went to the University of Minnesota School of Agriculture in Saint Paul, Minnesota. Wigley lived with his wife and family on a grain farm in Lake Crystal, Minnesota. Wigley served on the Blue Earth County Commission and the Lake Crystal School Board. He also served on the Blue Earth County Sherriff's Civil Service Commission and was the chair. Wigley served in the Minnesota House of Representatives from 1971 to 1985. Wigley died suddenly while he was on his tractor at his farm in Lake Crystal, Minnesota.
