= Stan Enebo =

American politician

Stanley A. Enebo (November 6, 1924 – November 1, 2012) was an American politician.

Enebo was born in Minneapolis, Minnesota. He went to the Minneapolis public schools and to the University of Minnesota. Enebo also went to Dunwoody College of Technology. He graduated from Metropolitan State University with a degree in labor relations. Enebo served in the United States Army during World War II. He was an electrician and was involved with real estate. Enebo served in the Minnesota House of Representatives from 1959 to 1966 and from 1971 to 1979 when he resigned from the Minnesota Legislature. Enebo was a Democrat. He then served as director of the Minnesota Public Employees Retirement Association. Enebo lived in Florida from 1987 to 2004. He died in Bellingham, Washington.
