= Eugene E. Stokowski =

American politician and businessman

Member of the Minnesota House of Representatives from the 55th district
- In office January 1, 1973 – August 1, 1979

Personal details
- Born: Eugene Edward Stokowski; June 23, 1921 Minneapolis, Minnesota, U.S.
- Died: August 1, 1979 (aged 58)
- Resting place: Fort Snelling National Cemetery, Minnesota, U.S.
- Party: Democratic (DFL)
- Spouse: Anne K. Stokowski
- Children: 5
- Education: University of Minnesota (BA)
- Occupation: Politician, businessman

Military service
- Allegiance: United States
- Branch/service: United States Marine Corps
- Battles/wars: World War II

Eugene Edward Stokowski (June 23, 1921 – August 1, 1979) was an American politician and businessman.

Stokowski was born in Minneapolis, Minnesota, and graduated from Edison High School in 1939. He served in the United States Marine Corps during World War II. Stokowski graduated from the University of Minnesota in 1949 and was involved with the stock market. Stokowski served on the Minneapolis City Council and was a Democrat. He served in the Minnesota Senate from 1973 until his death in 1979 at age 58. His wife, Anne, also served in the Minnesota Senate.
