= Anne K. Stokowski =

American politician (1925–2020)

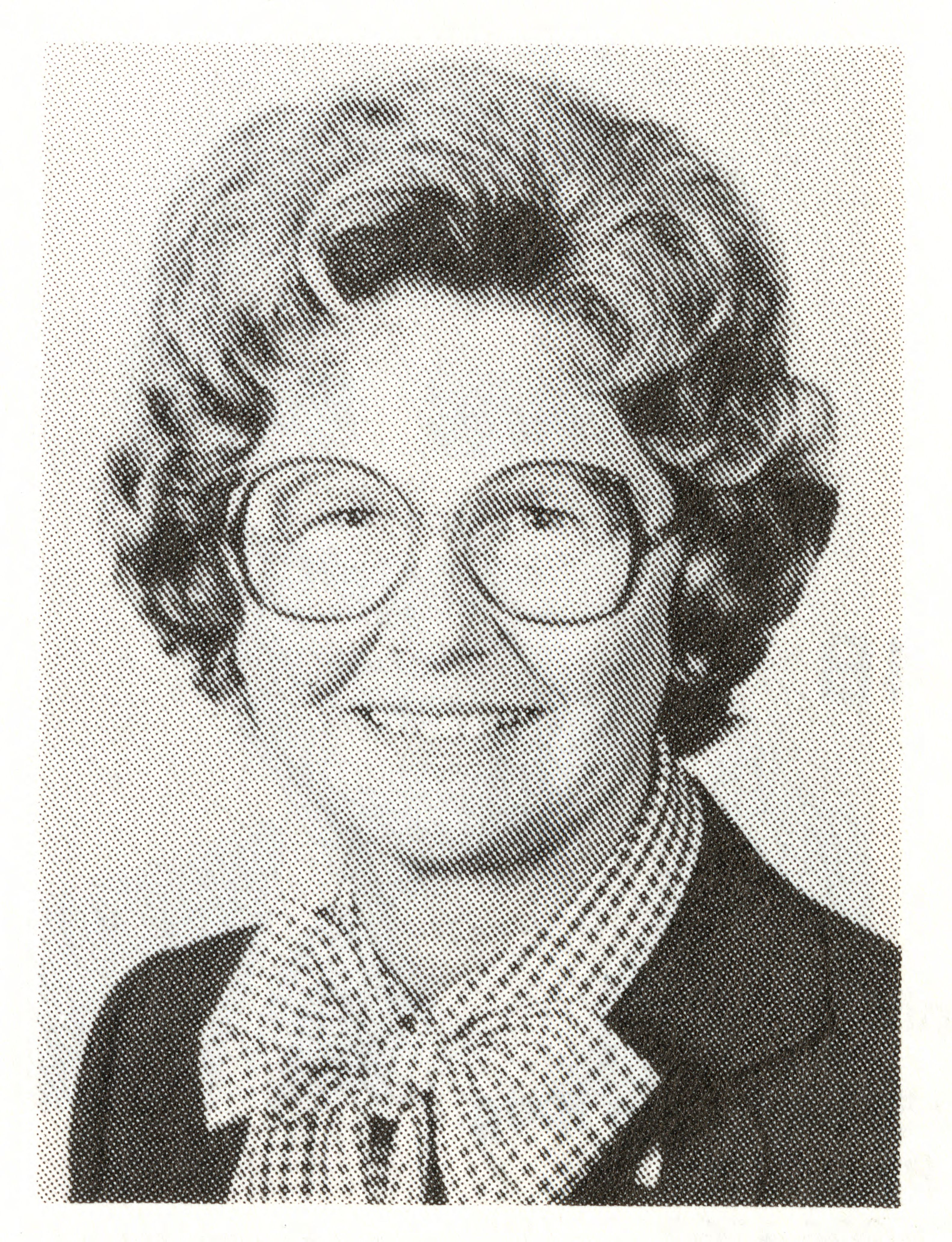

Anne Kocon Stokowski (November 26, 1925 – July 26, 2020) was an American politician.

Stokowski lived in Minneapolis, Minnesota and went to Edison High School in Minneapolis. She was a homemaker. Stokowski served in the Minnesota Senate (District 55 ) from 1979 to 1982 and was a Democrat. Her husband Eugene E. Stokowski also served in the Minnesota Senate.

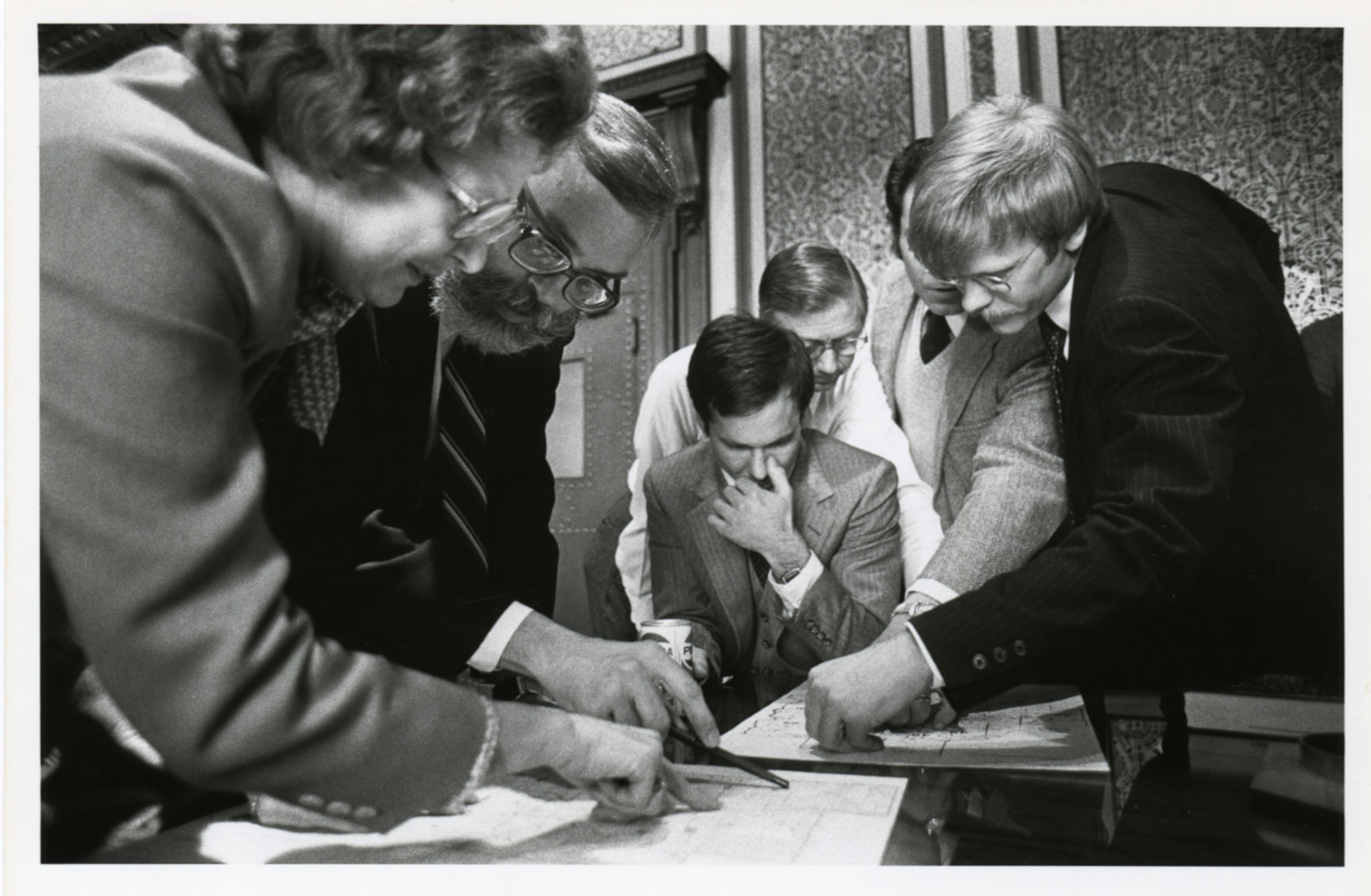
Senator Anne Stokowski, Senator Don Frank, Senator Greg Dahl, and Senator Randoph Peterson examine redistricting maps, St. Paul, Minnesota.
