= Minnesota's 13th Senate district =

American legislative district

Minnesota's 13th State Senate district
Senator
| Jeff Howe; R–Rockville |

The 13th district of the Minnesota Senate is one of 67 Minnesota State Senate districts. It encompasses part of Stearns County. The seat has been held by Republican Jeff Howe of Rockville since 2018.

== List of senators ==
List of Minnesota State senators from District 12
| Session | Image | Senator | Party | Term start | Term end | Residence | Counties represented | Ref. |
|---|---|---|---|---|---|---|---|---|
| 1st | | Boyd Phelps | Republican | December 2, 1857 | December 6, 1859 | Elkhorn | Dodge and Mower counties. | |
| 2nd | | Alonzo J. Edgerton | Republican | December 7, 1859 | January 7, 1861 | Mantorville | Dodge and Mower counties. | |
| 2nd | | Henry C. Rogers | Republican | December 7, 1859 | January 7, 1861 | Unknown | Dodge and Mower counties. | |
| 3rd | | Thomas McRoberts | N/A | January 8, 1861 | January 6, 1862 | La Crescent | Houston county. | |
| 4th | | Charles H. See | Republican | January 7, 1862 | January 4, 1864 | Brownsville | Houston county. | |
| 5th | | Charles H. See | Republican | January 7, 1862 | January 4, 1864 | Brownsville | Houston county. | |
| 6th | | Daniel Cameron | N/A | January 5, 1864 | January 1, 1866 | La Crescent | Houston county. | |
| 7th | | Daniel Cameron | N/A | January 5, 1864 | January 1, 1866 | La Crescent | Houston county. | |
| 8th | | David L. Buell | Democratic | January 2, 1866 | January 7, 1867 | Caledonia | Houston county. | |
| 9th | | Daniel F. Temple | Republican | January 8, 1867 | January 6, 1868 | Wilmington | Houston county. | |
| 10th | | David L. Buell | Democratic | January 7, 1868 | February 7, 1868 | Caledonia | Houston county. | |
| 10th | | George F. Potter | Republican | February 7, 1868 | January 3, 1870 | La Crescent | Houston county. | |
| 11th | | George F. Potter | Republican | February 7, 1868 | January 3, 1870 | La Crescent | Houston county. | |
| 12th | | David L. Buell | Democratic | January 4, 1870 | January 1, 1872 | Caledonia | Houston county. | |
| 13th | | David L. Buell | Democratic | January 4, 1870 | January 1, 1872 | Caledonia | Houston county. | |
| 14th | | David L. Buell | Democratic | January 2, 1872 | January 6, 1873 | Caledonia | Houston county. | |
| 15th | | William G. Ward | Liberal Republican | January 7, 1873 | January 4, 1875 | Waseca | Waseca county. | |
| 16th | | William G. Ward | Liberal Republican | January 7, 1873 | January 4, 1875 | Waseca | Waseca county. | |
| 17th | | Peter McGovern | N/A | January 5, 1875 | January 1, 1877 | Waseca | Waseca county. | |
| 18th | | Peter McGovern | N/A | January 5, 1875 | January 1, 1877 | Waseca | Waseca county. | |
| 19th | | Philo C. Bailey | Republican | January 2, 1877 | January 6, 1879 | Waseca | Waseca county. | |
| 20th | | Philo C. Bailey | Republican | January 2, 1877 | January 6, 1879 | Waseca | Waseca county. | |
| 21st | | Samuel B. Williams | N/A | January 7, 1879 | January 3, 1881 | Waseca | Waseca county. | |
| 22nd | | Robert L. McCormick | N/A | January 4, 1881 | January 1, 1883 | Waseca | Waseca county. | |
| 23rd | | James McLaughlin | N/A | January 2, 1883 | February 22, 1883 | Mantorville | Dodge county. | |
| 23rd | | Vacant | N/A | February 22, 1883 | January 6, 1885 | Mantorville | Dodge county. | |
| 24th | | Erasmus C. Severance | N/A | January 6, 1885 | January 3, 1887 | Mantorville | Dodge county. | |
| 25th | | E. N. Dodge | Republican | January 4, 1887 | January 4, 1891 | Claremont | Dodge county. | |
| 26th | | E. N. Dodge | Republican | January 4, 1887 | January 4, 1891 | Claremont | Dodge county. | |
| 27th | | Jeremiah Grinnell | Republican | January 5, 1891 | January 3, 1893 | Kasson | Dodge county. | |
| 28th | | John T. Little | Republican | January 6, 1893 | January 6, 1895 | Kasson | Dodge county. | |
| 29th | | Henry Currier | Republican | January 7, 1895 | January 1, 1899 | Concord | Dodge county. | |
| 30th | | Henry Currier | Republican | January 7, 1895 | January 1, 1899 | Concord | Dodge county. | |
| 31st | | William Viesselman | Democratic | January 2nd, 1899 | January 4th, 1903 | Fairmont | Martin and Watonwan counties. | |
| 32nd | | William Viesselman | Democratic | January 2nd, 1899 | January 4th, 1903 | Fairmont | Martin and Watonwan counties. | |
| 33rd | | Thomas Thorson | Republican | January 5, 1903 | January 6, 1907 | Saint James | Martin and Watonwan counties. | |
| 34th | | Thomas Thorson | Republican | January 5, 1903 | January 6, 1907 | Saint James | Martin and Watonwan counties. | |
| 35th | | William A. Hinton | Republican | January 7, 1907 | January 1, 1911 | Truman | Martin and Watonwan counties. | |
| 36th | | William A. Hinton | Republican | January 7, 1907 | January 1, 1911 | Truman | Martin and Watonwan counties. | |
| 37th | | Julius E. Haycraft | Republican | January 1, 1911 | January 3, 1915 | Madelia | Martin and Watonwan counties. | |
| 38th | | Julius E. Haycraft | Republican | January 1, 1911 | January 3, 1915 | Madelia | Martin and Watonwan counties. | |
| 39th | | Olai Andreason Lende | Republican | January 4, 1915 | January 5, 1919 | Canby | Lyon and Yellow Medicine counties. | |
| 40th | | Olai Andreason Lende | Republican | January 4, 1915 | January 5, 1919 | Canby | Lyon and Yellow Medicine counties. | |
| 41st | | James H. Hall | Non-Partisan | January 6, 1919 | January 1, 1923 | Marshall | Lyon and Yellow Medicine counties. | |
| 42nd | | James H. Hall | Non-Partisan | January 6, 1919 | January 1, 1923 | Marshall | Lyon and Yellow Medicine counties. | |
| 43rd | | Konrad K. Solberg | Non-Partisan | January 2, 1923 | January 2, 1927 | Clarkfield | Lyon and Yellow Medicine counties. | |
| 44th | | Konrad K. Solberg | Non-Partisan | January 2, 1923 | January 2, 1927 | Clarkfield | Lyon and Yellow Medicine counties. | |
| 45th | | Konrad K. Solberg | Non-Partisan | January 3, 1927 | January 4, 1931 | Clarkfield | Lyon and Yellow Medicine counties. | |
| 46th | | Konrad K. Solberg | Non-Partisan | January 3, 1927 | January 4, 1931 | Clarkfield | Lyon and Yellow Medicine counties. | |
| 47th | | Emil L. Regnier | Non-Partisan (Liberal caucus) | January 5, 1931 | January 6, 1935 | Marshall | Lyon and Yellow Medicine counties. | |
| 48th | | Emil L. Regnier | Non-Partisan (Liberal caucus) | January 5, 1931 | January 6, 1935 | Marshall | Lyon and Yellow Medicine counties. | |
| 49th | | Ansgar Lorenzo Almen | Non-Partisan | January 7, 1935 | January 1, 1939 | Balaton | Lyon and Yellow Medicine counties. | |
| 50th | | Ansgar Lorenzo Almen | Non-Partisan | January 7, 1935 | January 1, 1939 | Balaton | Lyon and Yellow Medicine counties. | |
| 51st | | Ansgar Lorenzo Almen | Non-Partisan | January 2, 1939 | January 3, 1943 | Balaton | Lyon and Yellow Medicine counties. | |
| 52nd | | Ansgar Lorenzo Almen | Non-Partisan | January 2, 1939 | January 3, 1943 | Balaton | Lyon and Yellow Medicine counties. | |
| 53rd | | Ansgar Lorenzo Almen | Non-Partisan | January 4, 1943 | January 5, 1947 | Balaton | Lyon and Yellow Medicine counties. | |
| 54th | | Ansgar Lorenzo Almen | Non-Partisan | January 4, 1943 | January 5, 1947 | Balaton | Lyon and Yellow Medicine counties. | |
| 55th | | Ansgar Lorenzo Almen | Non-Partisan | January 6, 1947 | December 31, 1950 | Balaton | Lyon and Yellow Medicine counties. | |
| 56th | | Ansgar Lorenzo Almen | Non-Partisan | January 6, 1947 | December 31, 1950 | Balaton | Lyon and Yellow Medicine counties. | |
| 57th | | Ansgar Lorenzo Almen | Non-Partisan (Conservative caucus) | January 1, 1951 | January 2, 1955 | Balaton | Lyon and Yellow Medicine counties. | |
| 58th | | Ansgar Lorenzo Almen | Non-Partisan (Conservative caucus) | January 1, 1951 | January 2, 1955 | Balaton | Lyon and Yellow Medicine counties. | |
| 59th | | Joe A. Josefson | Non-Partisan (Conservative caucus) | January 3, 1955 | January 4, 1959 | Minneota | Lyon and Yellow Medicine counties. | |
| 60th | | Joe A. Josefson | Non-Partisan (Conservative caucus) | January 3, 1955 | January 4, 1959 | Minneota | Lyon and Yellow Medicine counties. | |
| 61st | | Joe A. Josefson | Non-Partisan (Conservative caucus) | January 5, 1959 | January 6, 1963 | Minneota | Lyon and Yellow Medicine counties. | |
| 62nd | | Joe A. Josefson | Non-Partisan (Conservative caucus) | January 5, 1959 | January 6, 1963 | Minneota | Lyon and Yellow Medicine counties. | |
| 63rd | | Paul A. Thuet Jr. | Non-Partisan (Liberal Caucus) | January 7, 1963 | January 1, 1967 | South Saint Paul | Dakota county. | |
| 64th | | Paul A. Thuet Jr. | Non-Partisan (Liberal Caucus) | January 7, 1963 | January 1, 1967 | South Saint Paul | Dakota county. | |
| 65th | | Victor N. Jude | Non-Partisan (Liberal Caucus) | January 2, 1967 | January 3, 1971 | Maple | Hennepin and Wright counties | |
| 66th | | Victor N. Jude | Non-Partisan (Liberal Caucus) | January 2, 1967 | January 3, 1971 | Maple | Hennepin and Wright counties | |
| 67th | | Victor N. Jude | Non-Partisan (Liberal Caucus) | January 4, 1971 | December 31, 1972 | Maple | Hennepin and Wright counties | |
| 68th | | Winston W. Borden | Non-Partisan (Democratic-Farmer-Labor caucus) | January 1, 1973 | January 2, 1977 | Brainerd | Aitkin, Crow Wing and Kanabec counties. | |
| 69th | | Winston W. Borden | Non-Partisan (Democratic-Farmer-Labor caucus) | January 1, 1973 | January 2, 1977 | Brainerd | Aitkin, Crow Wing and Kanabec counties. | |
| 70th | | Winston W. Borden | Democratic-Farmer-Labor | January 3, 1977 | January 1, 1979 | Brainerd | Aitkin, Crow Wing and Kanabec counties. | |
| 71st | | David E. Rued | Independent Republican | January 2, 1979 | January 1, 1983 | Aitkin | Aitkin, Crow Wing and Kanabec counties. | |
| 72nd | | David E. Rued | Independent Republican | January 2, 1979 | January 1, 1983 | Aitkin | Aitkin, Crow Wing and Kanabec counties. | |
| 73rd | | Donald B. Samuelson | Democratic-Farmer-Labor | January 2, 1983 | January 3, 1987 | Brainerd | Cass, Crow Wing and Morrison counties | |
| 74th | | Donald B. Samuelson | Democratic-Farmer-Labor | January 2, 1983 | January 3, 1987 | Brainerd | Cass, Crow Wing and Morrison counties | |
| 75th | | Donald B. Samuelson | Democratic-Farmer-Labor | January 4, 1987 | January 6, 1991 | Brainerd | Cass, Crow Wing and Morrison counties | |
| 76th | | Donald B. Samuelson | Democratic-Farmer-Labor | January 4, 1987 | January 6, 1991 | Brainerd | Cass, Crow Wing and Morrison counties | |
| 77th | | Donald B. Samuelson | Democratic-Farmer-Labor | January 7, 1991 | January 3, 1993 | Brainerd | Cass, Crow Wing and Morrison counties | |
| 78th | | Donald B. Samuelson | Democratic-Farmer-Labor | January 4, 1993 | January 5, 1997 | Brainerd | Cass, Crow Wing and Morrison counties | |
| 79th | | Donald B. Samuelson | Democratic-Farmer-Labor | January 4, 1993 | January 5, 1997 | Brainerd | Cass, Crow Wing and Morrison counties | |
| 80th | | Donald B. Samuelson | Democratic-Farmer-Labor | January 6, 1997 | December 31, 2000 | Brainerd | Cass, Crow Wing and Morrison counties | |
| 81st | | Donald B. Samuelson | Democratic-Farmer-Labor | January 6, 1997 | December 31, 2000 | Brainerd | Cass, Crow Wing and Morrison counties | |
| 82nd | | Donald B. Samuelson | Democratic-Farmer-Labor | January 1, 2001 | January 5, 2003 | Brainerd | Cass, Crow Wing and Morrison counties | |
| 83rd | | Dean Elton Johnson | Democratic-Farmer-Labor | January 6, 2003 | December 31, 2006 | Willmar | Kandiyohi, Pope and Stearns counties. | |
| 84th | | Dean Elton Johnson | Democratic-Farmer-Labor | January 6, 2003 | December 31, 2006 | Willmar | Kandiyohi, Pope and Stearns counties. | |
| 85th | | Joseph Gimse | Republican | January 1, 2007 | January 2, 2011 | Willmar | Kandiyohi, Pope and Stearns counties. | |
| 86th | | Joseph Gimse | Republican | January 1, 2007 | January 2, 2011 | Willmar | Kandiyohi, Pope and Stearns counties. | |
| 87th | | Joseph Gimse | Republican | January 3, 2011 | January 6, 2013 | Willmar | Kandiyohi, Pope and Stearns counties. | |
| 88th | | Michelle Fischbach | Republican | January 7, 2013 | January 1, 2017 | Paynesville | Benton and Stearns counties. | |
| 89th | | Michelle Fischbach | Republican | January 7, 2013 | January 1, 2017 | Paynesville | Benton and Stearns counties. | |
| 90th | | Michelle Fischbach | Republican | January 2, 2017 | May 25, 2018 | Paynesville | Benton and Stearns counties. | |
| 90th | | Jeff Howe | Republican | December 11, 2018 | January 3, 2021 | Rockville | Benton and Stearns counties. | |
| 91st | | Jeff Howe | Republican | December 11, 2018 | January 3, 2021 | Rockville | Benton and Stearns counties. | |
| 92nd | | Jeff Howe | Republican | January 4, 2021 | January 1, 2023 | Rockville | Benton and Stearns counties. | |
| 93rd | | Jeff Howe | Republican | January 2, 2023 | Incumbent | Rockville | Benton and Stearns counties. | |
| 94th | | Jeff Howe | Republican | January 2, 2023 | Incumbent | Rockville | Stearns county | |
