= Senator Jude =

Senator Jude may refer to:

- Tad Jude (born 1951), Minnesota State Senate
- Victor N. Jude (1923–1994), Minnesota State Senate
