= Juxtaposition (disambiguation) =

Juxtaposition is an act or instance of placing two elements close together or side by side, often to contrast them. Juxtaposition may also refer to:

- Juxtaposition Magazine, a student-run global health magazine at the University of Toronto
- Juxtaposition: Barons of Ceti V, a Wintersoft game
- Juxtaposability, the possibility in notations to show two related informations side by side

== See also ==
- Juxtaposition Arts, a youth oriented visual art center in Minneapolis, Minnesota, United States
- Juxtapose (disambiguation)
