= Senator Borden =

Senator Borden may refer to:

- Nathaniel B. Borden (1801–1865), Massachusetts State Senate
- Win Borden (1943–2014), Minnesota State Senate
