= Senator McGovern (disambiguation) =

George McGovern (1922–2012) was a U.S. Senator from South Dakota from 1963 to 1981.

Senator McGovern may also refer to:

- J. Raymond McGovern (1898–1974), New York State Senate
- Patricia McGovern (fl. 1980s–2010s), Massachusetts State Senate
- Peter McGovern (politician) (1845–1917), Minnesota State Senate
