= Julius E. Haycraft =

American lawyer and politician

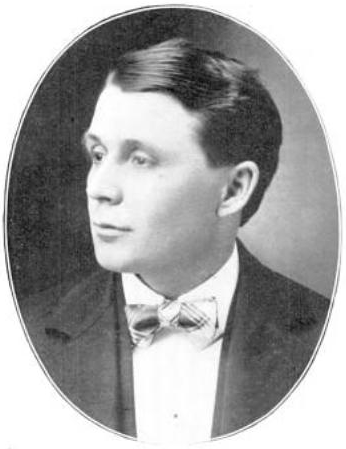

Member of the Minnesota Senate from the 13th district
- In office January 1, 1911 – January 3, 1915
- Preceded by: William A. Hinton
- Succeeded by: Olai Andreason Lende

Personal details
- Born: Julius Everett Haycraft; August 26, 1871 Blue Earth County, Minnesota, U.S.
- Died: November 5, 1951 (aged 80) Fairmont, Minnesota, U.S.
- Party: Republican
- Occupation: Lawyer, politician

Julius Everett Haycraft (August 26, 1871 – November 5, 1951) was an American lawyer and politician.

== Biography ==
Haycraft was born on a farm in Blue Earth County, Minnesota, near the city of Madelia, on August 26, 1871. He went to the Minnesota public schools, and to Curtiss Business College in Minneapolis. Haycraft read law in a Madelia law office and was admitted to the Minnesota bar in 1896.

He lived in Madelia with his wife and family and served as the city's postmaster. A Republican, Haycraft served in the Minnesota Senate from 1911 to 1914. In 1915, he moved to Fairmont with his wife and family. Haycraft served as the president of the Martin County Historical Society. He served as a Minnesota District Court judge from 1925 to 1948. Haycraft's nickname was "The Sturdy Little Yankee from Watonwan County."

He died at his home in Fairmont on November 5, 1951.
