= Juxtapose (disambiguation) =

Juxtapose is the verb form of juxtaposition. Juxtapose may also refer to:

- Juxtapose (album) by Tricky
- Juxtapoz Art & Culture Magazine
- JXTA, an open-source protocol

== See also ==
- Juxtaposition (disambiguation)
