= James Jude =

American physician

- Born: June 7, 1928; Maple Lake, Minnesota, United States
- Died: July 28, 2015 (aged 87); Coral Gables, Florida, United States
- Education: Johns Hopkins University
- Known for: Development of CPR
- Scientific career
- Fields: Thoracic Surgery, Cardiopulmonary bypass, Cardioplegia, Emergency medicine

James R. Jude (June 7, 1928 – July 28, 2015) was an American thoracic surgeon who was one of the developers of cardiopulmonary resuscitation (CPR). He was the brother of Victor N. Jude, a businessman and politician from Minnesota, and the uncle of Tad Jude, a former district court judge and candidate in the 2022 Minnesota Attorney General election.

While working as a resident at Johns Hopkins University in Baltimore in the 1950s, Jude made the discovery that manual pressure applied to the exterior of a patient's chest could restore cardiac output in the case of cardiac arrest. He later went on to promote CPR among the medical community. Jude practiced thoracic surgery in Miami. For his contributions to the development of CPR, he received the Hektoen Gold Medal from the American Medical Association with William B. Kouwenhoven and Guy Knickerbocker.
