= Peter John Eli Peterson =

American politician (1887–1962)

Peter John Eli Peterson (January 24, 1887 – November 25, 1962) was an American businessman, farmer, and politician.

Peterson was born in Clinton County, Iowa and moved to Truman, Martin County, Minnesota in 1892. He lived in Truman, Minnesota with his wife and family and was a farmer and a businessman. Peterson served in the Minnesota House of Representatives from 1937 to 1942.
