= 2026 Minnesota Secretary of State election =

- November 3, 2026
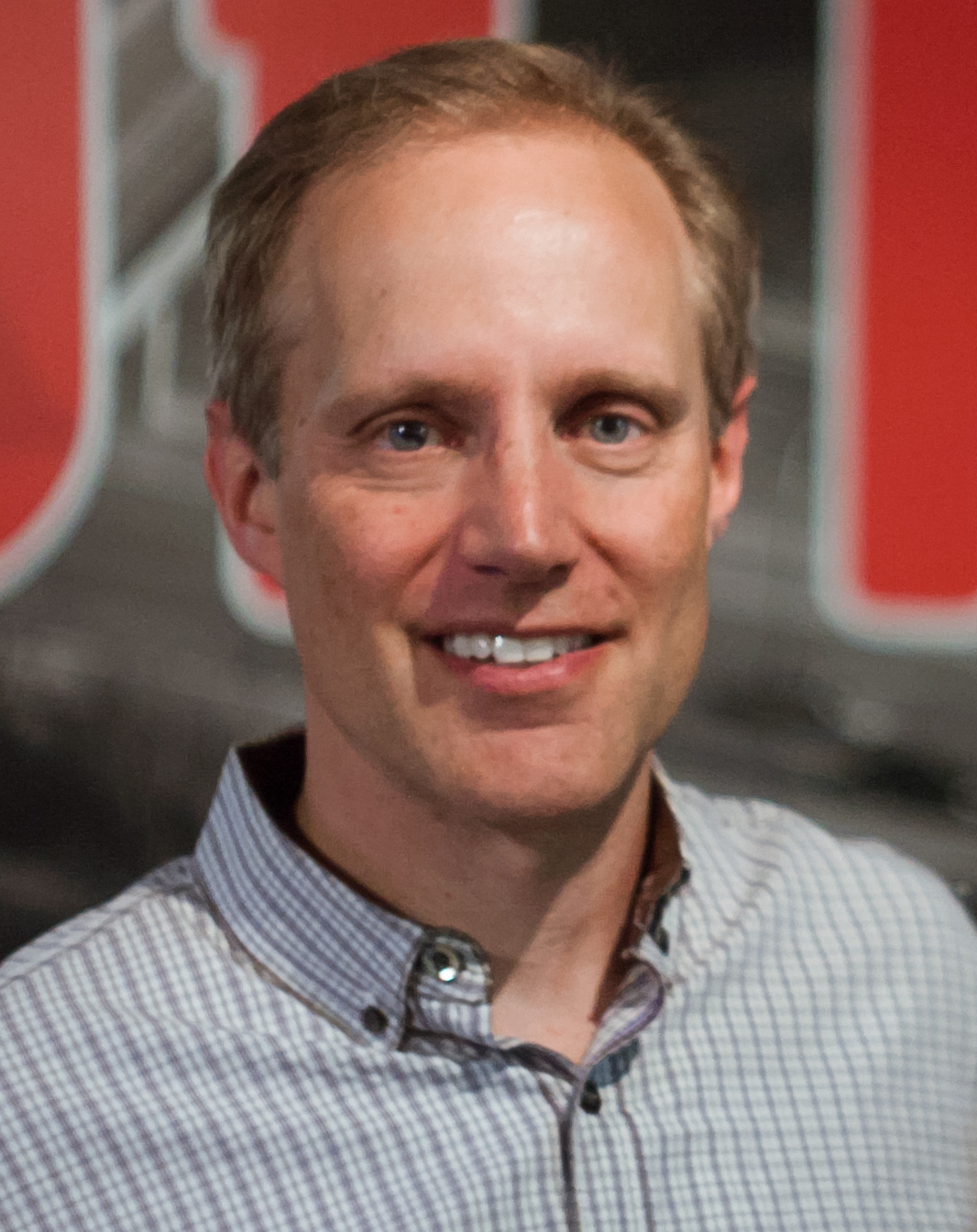

Nominee	Steve Simon	Tad Jude
Party	Democratic (DFL)	Republican
Popular vote	1,529,176	1,168,656
Percentage	54.71%	41.81%
- Simon: 40–50% 50–60% 60–70% 70–80% 80–90% >90% Jude: 40–50% 50–60% 60–70% 70–80% 80–90% >90% Tie: 40–50% 50% No votes
Secretary of State before election
Steve Simon
Democratic (DFL)
Elected Secretary of State
Steve Simon
Democratic (DFL)

The 2026 Minnesota Secretary of State election was held on November 3, 2026, to elect the Minnesota secretary of state. Incumbent secretary Steve Simon won re-election to a fourth term.

== Democratic primary ==
=== Candidates ===
==== Nominee ====
- Steve Simon, incumbent secretary of state (2015–present)

=== Endorsements ===
Steve Simon

Labor unions

- SEIU Minnesota State Council
- AFL-CIO

Organizations

- Stonewall DFL

Political parties

- Minnesota Democratic-Farmer-Labor Party

=== Results ===
Democratic primary results
Party	Candidate	Votes	%
Democratic (DFL)	Steve Simon	615,129	100.0
Total votes		615,129	100.0

== Republican primary ==
=== Candidates ===
==== Nominee ====
- Tad Jude, former judge from the 10th judicial district (2011–2021), former Democratic state senator from the 48th district (1983–1989), and nominee for Minnesota's 3rd congressional district in 2024

==== Eliminated in primary ====
- Wendy Phillips, business owner

==== Withdrawn ====
- David Meissner, IT professional

=== Endorsements ===
Tad Jude

Political parties

- Republican Party of Minnesota

=== Results ===
Primary results by county: Jude: 50–60%; 60–70%; 70–80%; Phillips: 50–60%

Primary results by congressional district: Jude: 50–60%; 60–70%; 70–80%

Primary results by state senate district: Jude: 50–60%; 60–70%; 70–80%; Phillips: 50–60%

Primary results by state house district: Jude: 50–60%; 60–70%; 70–80%; 80–90%; Phillips: 50–60%

Primary results by precinct: Jude: 50–60%; 60–70%; 70–80%; 80–90%; 90–100%; Phillips: 50–60%; 60–70%; 70–80%; 80–90%; 90–100%; 50% Tie No Votes Cast

Republican primary results
Party	Candidate	Votes	%
Republican	Tad Jude	229,804	60.3
Republican	Wendy Phillips	151,599	39.7
Total votes		381,403	100.0

== Third-party and other candidates ==
=== Candidates ===
==== Declared ====
- Seth Kuhl-Stennes, non-profit worker and community activist (Green)
- George "Chip" Tangen, former legislative counsel to Rep. Jim Ramstad (Libertarian)

==== Write-in candidates ====
- Anuh'et Aesh

== General election ==
=== Predictions ===
Source	Ranking	As of
Sabato's Crystal Ball	Lean D	October 29, 2026

=== Post-primary endorsements ===
Steve Simon (D)

Organizations

- Everytown for Gun Safety

=== Polling ===
Poll source	Date(s) administered	Sample size (Note: Key: A – all adults RV – registered voters LV – likely voters V – unclear)	Margin of error	Steve Simon (DFL)	Tad Jude (R)	Other	Undecided
KSTP/SurveyUSA	October 24–28, 2026	714 (LV)	± 4.2%	47%	36%	6% (Note: George Tangen (L) with 4%; Seth Kuhl-Stennes (G) with 2%)	11%
KSTP/SurveyUSA	October 8–12, 2026	718 (LV)	± 4.2%	43%	37%	5% (Note: George Tangen (L) with 3%; Seth Kuhl-Stennes (G) with 2%)	15%
KSTP/SurveyUSA	September 9–14, 2026	654 (LV)	± 4.4%	40%	36%	5% (Note: Seth Kuhl-Stennes (G) with 3%; George Tangen (L) with 2%)	20%
KSTP/SurveyUSA	August 13–17, 2026	661 (LV)	± 4.3%	41%	34%	4%	20%

=== Results ===
2026 Minnesota Secretary of State election
Party	Candidate	Votes	%	±%
Democratic (DFL)	Steve Simon (incumbent)	1,529,169	54.71%	+0.18%
Republican	Tad Jude	1,168,649	41.81%	−3.57%
Libertarian	George "Chip" Tangen	54,693	1.96%	
Green	Seth Kuhl-Stennes	41,389	1.48%	
Write-in		1,291	0.05%	−0.03%
Total votes		2,795,174	100.0	
Democratic (DFL) hold				

==== By congressional district ====
Both Simon and Jude won four congressional districts.

District	Simon	Jude	Elected Representative
1st	46.98%	49.42%	Jake Johnson
2nd	55.25%	41.17%	Matt Little
3rd	61.11%	35.85%	Kelly Morrison
4th	70.45%	25.66%	Betty McCollum
5th	82.65%	13.56%	Ilhan Omar
6th	42.19%	54.44%	Tom Emmer
7th	33.64%	63.24%	Michelle Fischbach
8th	45.10%	51.36%	Pete Stauber
