= 1875 Minnesota gubernatorial election =

- November 2, 1875
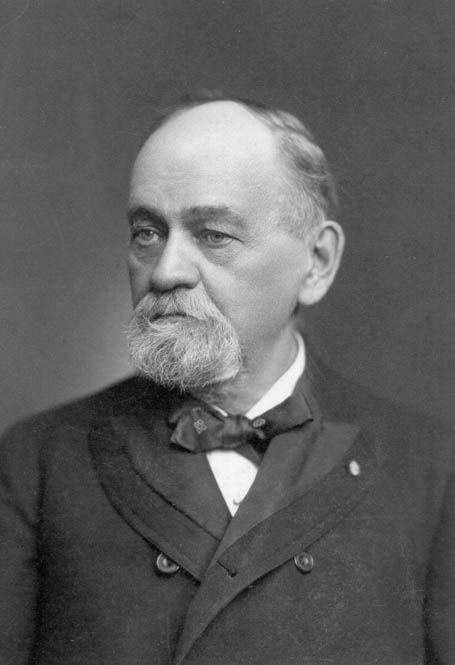

Nominee	John S. Pillsbury	David L. Buell
Party	Republican	Democratic
Popular vote	47,073	35,275
Percentage	56.08%	42.03%
- County results Pillsbury: 50–60% 60–70% 70–80% 80–90% 90–100% Buell: 50–60% 60–70% 70–80% Unknown/no vote
Governor before election
C. K. Davis
Republican
Elected Governor
John S. Pillsbury
Republican

The 1875 Minnesota gubernatorial election was held on November 2, 1875, to elect the governor of Minnesota. Incumbent Republican Cushman Kellogg Davis did not seek another term.

== Candidates ==
- David L. Buell, member of the Minnesota House of Representatives (Democrat)
- Ramson F. (R.F.) Humiston, founder of Worthington, Minnesota (Prohibition)
- John S. Pillsbury, businessman (Republican)

== Campaigns ==
On July 7, 1875, the Party-Colored Convention was held, a coalition of Democrats, Liberal Republicans, Anti-Monopolists, and all those opposed to the Republican Party of Minnesota. Democrat David L. Buell (who had previously lost the Democratic nomination in 1873) was nominated on the first ballot. His reputation with the public soured in early september, as his alleged business practices became known. Buell was a moneylender and was said to set interest rates as high as he could, to take additional money from his clients. These claims were disproven, but did harm his reputation.

Pillsbury, upon announcing he was running, was seen as a long-shot and unlikely candidate. He was nominated by the Republican State Convention on July 28, 1875, on the first ballot, after defeating primary challengers Horace Austin and Jacob H. Stewart.

== Results ==
Minnesota gubernatorial election, 1875
Party	Candidate	Votes	%
Republican	John S. Pillsbury	47,073	56.08
Democratic	David L. Buell	35,275	42.03
Prohibition	R. F. Humiston	1,589	1.89
Total votes		83,937	100
Republican hold			
