= Brooklyn Center, Minnesota =

City in Minnesota, United States

- City
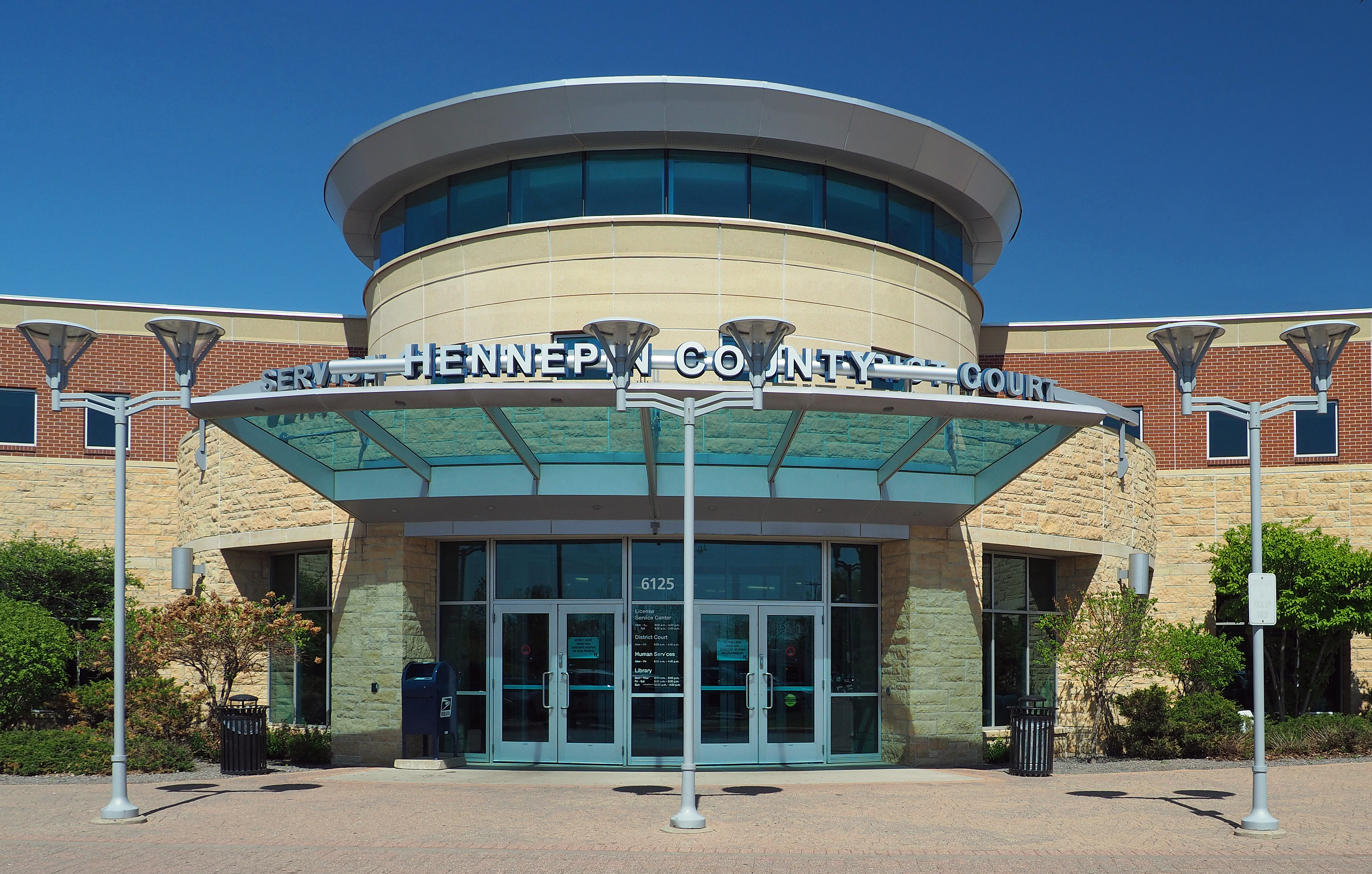
- Hennepin County District Court in Brooklyn Center

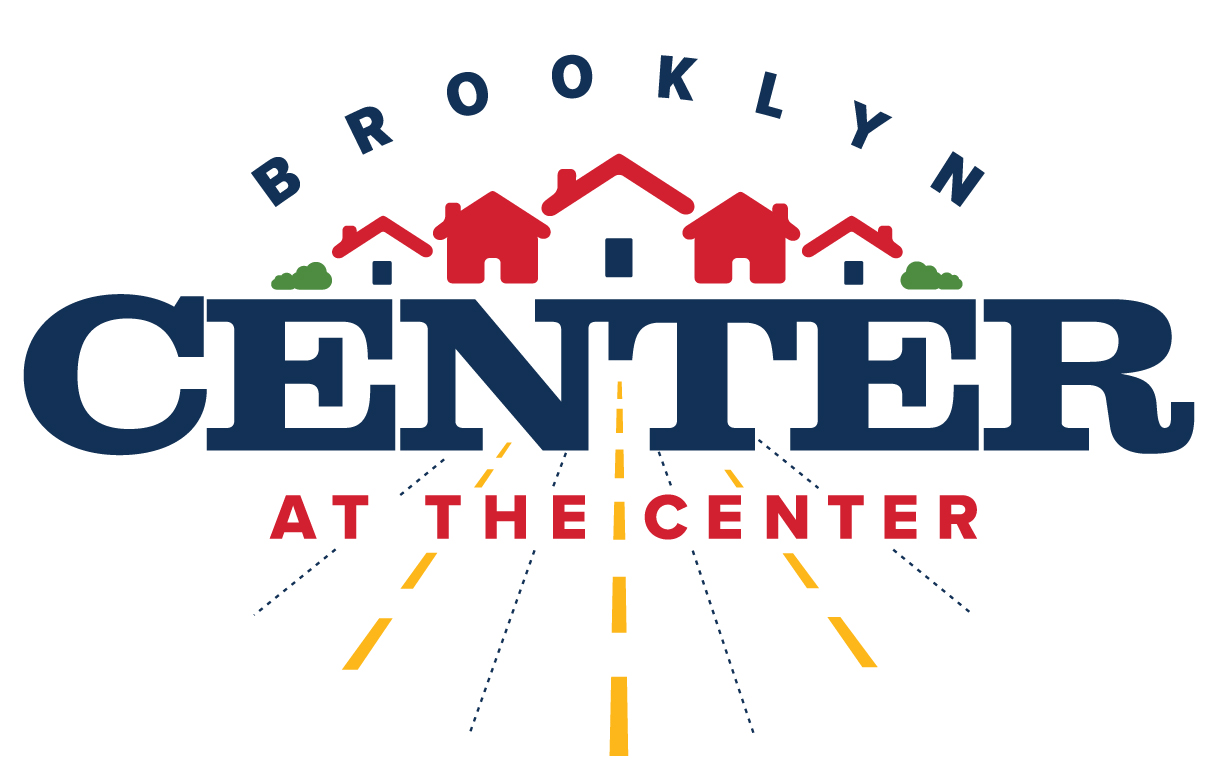
- Seal
- Motto: At The Center
- Interactive map of Brooklyn Center, Minnesota
- Location within Minnesota Location within the United States
- Coordinates: 45.067970°N 93.317829°W
- Country: United States
- State: Minnesota
- County: Hennepin
- Settled: 1852
- Incorporated (village): February 18, 1911
- Incorporated (city): December 8, 1966

Government
  - Type: Mayor–council
  - Mayor: April Graves
  - City manager: Daren Nyquist
  - Councilmembers: Dan Jerzak; Teneshia Kragness; Kris Lawrence-Anderson; Laurie Ann Moore

Area
  - Total: 8.381 sq mi (21.707 km^{2})
  - Land: 8.003 sq mi (20.728 km^{2})
  - Water: 0.378 sq mi (0.979 km^{2}) 4.51%
- Elevation: 856 ft (261 m)

Population (2020)
  - Total: 33,782
  - Estimate (2024): 31,755
  - Density: 4,221.1/sq mi (1,629.8/km^{2})
- Time zone: UTC−6 (Central (CST))
  - Summer (DST): UTC−5 (CDT)
- ZIP Codes: 55429, 55430
- Area code: 763
- FIPS code: 27-07948
- GNIS feature ID: 0640508
- Website: brooklyncentermn.gov

Brooklyn Center is a first-ring suburban city in Hennepin County, Minnesota, United States. The population was 33,782 at the 2020 census, and was estimated at 31,755 in 2024. It is part of the Minneapolis–Saint Paul metropolitan area.

On February 18, 1911, the area became a village formed from parts of Brooklyn Township and Crystal Lake Township. On December 8, 1966, Brooklyn Center became a charter city. The city has commercial and industrial development. The majority of land use is single-family homes. and the city has become the most ethnically diverse community in the state.

== History ==
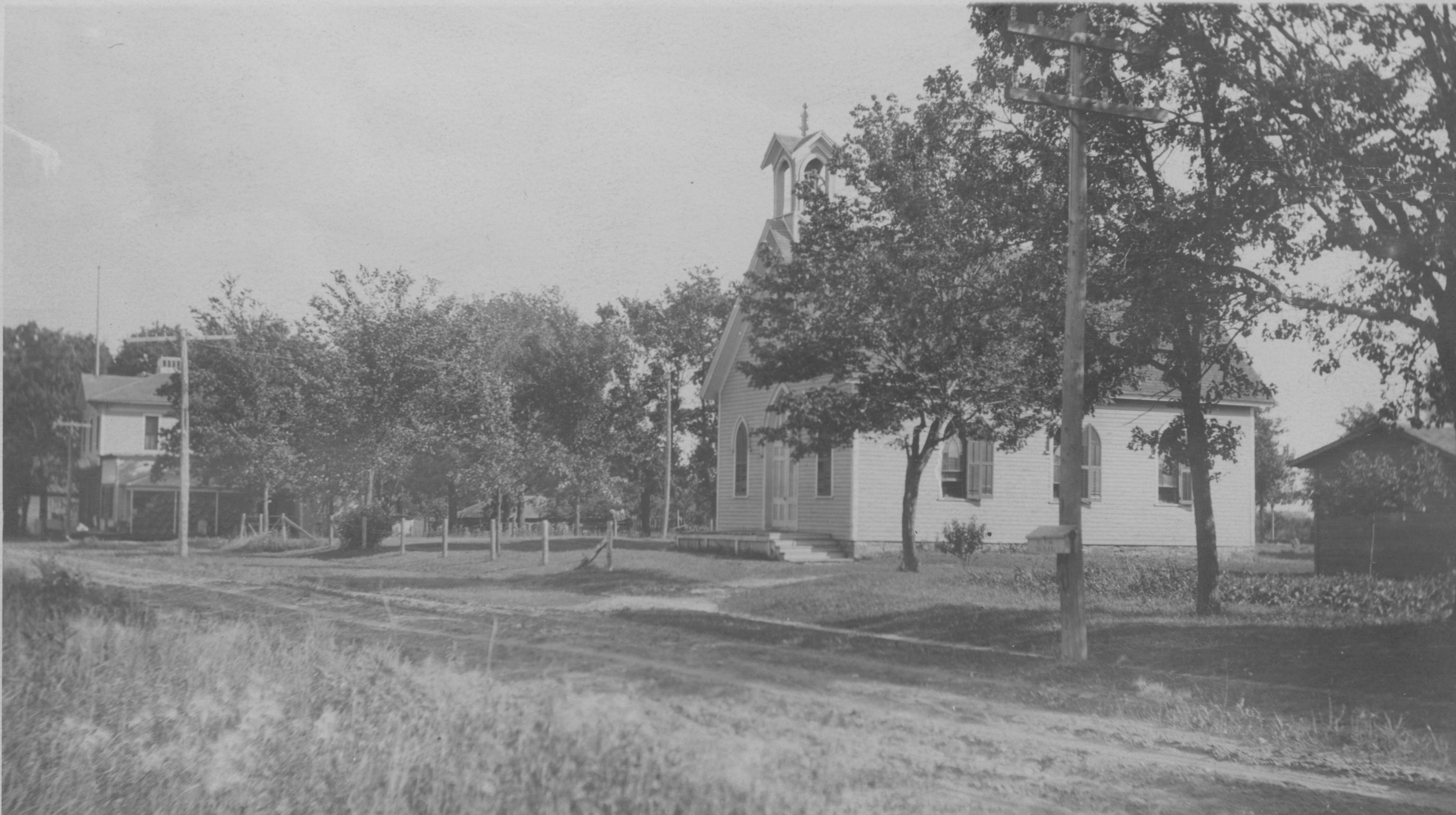
Brooklyn Center Baptist Church, 1903.

Pioneers organized town governments for Brooklyn Township and Crystal Lake Township when Minnesota became a state in 1858. Osseo Road was a main thoroughfare that brought settlers to an area centered around their school, post office, store, meeting hall, and Baptist and Methodist churches. That location thrived as a market gardening community. It abutted the encroaching development of Minneapolis to the south.

Steps were taken to protect the area from annexation by Minneapolis and to retain "simpler public business methods, and extra police protection" by incorporation. The Hennepin County Board of Commissioners accepted a petition to incorporate the Village of Brooklyn Center on January 16, 1911. An election followed, the boundaries were set, and documents filed with the state on February 18, 1911. P.W. Reidhead was the first president. The population was 500.

By 1940, the village saw a need for more organized planning to deal with issues such as sewage and traffic. In 1942, a Planning Commission was established. Farmers were selling their valuable land to housing developers. The decade saw unprecedented population growth, reaching 4,000 by 1950. Brookdale, a new shopping concept by Dayton’s, was constructed in 1960 when the population had grown to over 24,000. In 1963, even more new opportunities for commercial development were presented with the estate of Earle Brown, deceased, the heir of Captain John Martin who had been one of the wealthiest men in Minneapolis.

Heritage Center of Brooklyn Center was the former Cap Martin country estate, built in 1878 and willed to his grandson Earle Brown in 1901. The buildings included the family home, office and garage, housing for the workers, a pump house, multiple barns, a hippodrome, an antique carriage collection, and a restored lumber bunkhouse and cook shanty. It is now a historic site in Brooklyn Center owned by the city and developed into a conference and event center.

In April 2021, Daunte Wright was killed by a city police officer. Due to elevated racial tensions and anti-police sentiment because of the concurrent Derek Chauvin trial, riots and looting broke out. California Congresswoman Maxine Waters traveled to the city to hold a rally for the protestors, encouraging further protests should Chauvin not be found guilty. The city worked with Juxtaposition Arts on a permanent memorial to Wright.

== Geography ==
According to the United States Census Bureau, the city has a total area of 8.381 square miles (21.71 km^{2}), of which 8.003 square miles (20.73 km^{2}) is land and 0.378 square miles (0.98 km^{2}) (4.51%) is water.

All of Brooklyn Center is in the Upper Mississippi Watershed Basin. The Mississippi River is the eastern boundary of the city and is part of the Mississippi National River and Recreation Area of Minnesota. The North Mississippi Regional Park, at 5700 Lyndale Avenue North, is managed by Three Rivers Park District Board, on which Brooklyn Center is represented in District 3.

Southwestern Brooklyn Center includes Upper Twin Lake (117 acres) and connects to a chain of lakes that discharge into Shingle Creek, which discharges into the Mississippi River. Shingle Creek also runs through Palmer Lake. The city is a member of Shingle Creek and West Mississippi Watershed Management Commission, which manages the lakes, streams, and wetlands in this area. Palmer Lake Park is a natural environmental preserve of lake and marsh habitat on over 200 acres.

All of Brooklyn Center is in the state's Deciduous Forest Biome. The Plant Hardiness Zone is 4B, with an average minimum extreme temperature of −25 to −20 Fahrenheit. The city has developed and maintains 26 parks and a 20-mile trail system. The majority of land use is single-family homes. The historical route, Osseo Road, was renamed Brooklyn Boulevard by both Brooklyn Center and Brooklyn Park in 1969. Interstates 94 and 694 and Minnesota State Highways 100 and 252 are four of the main routes in Brooklyn Center.

== Demographics ==
Historical population
Census	Pop.	Note	%±
1920	788		—
1930	1,344		70.6%
1940	1,870		39.1%
1950	4,284		129.1%
1960	24,356		468.5%
1970	35,173		44.4%
1980	31,230		−11.2%
1990	28,887		−7.5%
2000	29,172		1.0%
2010	30,104		3.2%
2020	33,782		12.2%
2024 (est.)	31,755		−6.0%
U.S. Decennial Census; 2020 Census

According to realtor website Zillow, the average price of a home as of February 28, 2026, in Brooklyn Center is $293,538.

As of the 2024 American Community Survey, there are 11,164 estimated households in Brooklyn Center with an average of 2.87 persons per household. The city has a median household income of $72,535. Approximately 12.3% of the city's population lives at or below the poverty line. Brooklyn Center has an estimated 65.7% employment rate, with 24.6% of the population holding a bachelor's degree or higher and 88.1% holding a high school diploma. There were 11,572 housing units at an average density of 1,445.96 per square mile (558.3/km^{2}).

The top five reported languages (people were allowed to report up to two languages, thus the figures will generally add to more than 100%) were English (69.7%), Spanish (13.3%), Indo-European (1.2%), Asian and Pacific Islander (11.0%), and Other (4.7%).

The median age in the city was 33.5 years.

=== Racial and ethnic composition ===
Brooklyn Center, Minnesota – racial and ethnic composition Note: the US Census treats Hispanic/Latino as an ethnic category. This table excludes Latinos from the racial categories and assigns them to a separate category. Hispanics/Latinos may be of any race.
Race / ethnicity (NH = non-Hispanic)
Race / ethnicity (NH = non-Hispanic)	Population 1990		Population 2000		Population 2010		Population 2020	
Race / ethnicity (NH = non-Hispanic)	Number	Percent	Number	Percent	Number	Percent	Number	Percent
White alone (NH)	26,067	90.24%	20,530	70.38%	13,815	45.89%	11,105	32.87%
Black or African American alone (NH)	1,483	5.13%	4,088	14.01%	7,744	25.72%	9,340	27.65%
Native American or Alaska Native alone (NH)	262	0.91%	229	0.78%	182	0.60%	245	0.73%
Asian alone (NH)	667	2.31%	2,549	8.74%	4,291	14.25%	6,401	18.95%
Pacific Islander alone (NH)	—	—	4	0.01%	11	0.04%	7	0.02%
Other race alone (NH)	41	0.14%	70	0.24%	70	0.23%	162	0.48%
Mixed race or multiracial (NH)	—	—	879	3.01%	1,102	3.66%	1,848	5.47%
Hispanic or Latino (any race)	367	1.27%	823	2.82%	2,889	9.60%	4,674	13.84%
Total	28,887	100.00%	29,172	100.00%	30,104	100.00%	33,782	100.00%

=== 2024 estimate ===
As of the 2024 estimate, there were 31,755 people, 11,164 households, and _ families residing in the city. The population density was 3,967.89 inhabitants per square mile (1,532.0/km^{2}). There were 11,572 housing units at an average density of 1,445.96 per square mile (558.3/km^{2}). The racial makeup of the county was 31.5% White (30.6% NH White), 31.5% African American, 1.4% Native American, 15.2% Asian, 0.0% Pacific Islander, _% from some other races and 10.9% from two or more races. Hispanic or Latino people of any race were 16.5% of the population.

=== 2020 census ===
As of the 2020 census, Brooklyn Center had a population of 33,782. The median age was 33.1 years. 27.7% of residents were under the age of 18 and 11.9% of residents were 65 years of age or older. For every 100 females there were 96.6 males, and for every 100 females age 18 and over there were 92.8 males age 18 and over.

There were 11,309 households and 7,413 families residing in the city. Of these households, 36.8% had children under the age of 18 living in them, 37.2% were married-couple households, 21.0% were households with a male householder and no spouse or partner present, and 31.3% were households with a female householder and no spouse or partner present. About 25.9% of all households were made up of individuals and 9.2% had someone living alone who was 65 years of age or older.

The population density was 4,221.17 inhabitants per square mile (1,629.8/km^{2}). There were 11,665 housing units at an average density of 1,457.58 per square mile (562.8/km^{2}), of which 3.1% were vacant. The homeowner vacancy rate was 1.0% and the rental vacancy rate was 3.3%.

All residents lived in urban areas, while none lived in rural areas.

Racial composition as of the 2020 census
Race	Number	Percent
White	11,628	34.4%
Black or African American	9,449	28.0%
American Indian and Alaska Native	458	1.4%
Asian	6,425	19.0%
Native Hawaiian and Other Pacific Islander	7	0.0%
Some other race	2,774	8.2%
Two or more races	3,041	9.0%
Hispanic or Latino (of any race)	4,674	13.8%

=== 2010 census ===
As of the 2010 census, there were 30,104 people, 10,756 households, and 7,010 families residing in the city. The population density was 3,784.29 inhabitants per square mile (1,461.1/km^{2}). There were 11,640 housing units at an average density of 1,463.23 per square mile (565.0/km^{2}). The racial makeup of the city was 49.12% White, 25.94% African American, 0.77% Native American, 14.31% Asian, 0.07% Pacific Islander, 5.37% from some other races and 4.41% from two or more races. Hispanic or Latino people of any race were 9.60% of the population.

There were 10,756 households, of which 36.0% had children under the age of 18 living with them, 40.4% were married couples living together, 18.1% had a female householder with no husband present, 6.6% had a male householder with no wife present, and 34.8% were non-families. 27.7% of all households were made up of individuals, and 10.7% had someone living alone who was 65 years of age or older. The average household size was 2.78 and the average family size was 3.43.

The city's median age was 32.6. 27.6% of residents were under the age of 18; 10.1% were between the ages of 18 and 24; 28.1% were from 25 to 44; 22.1% were from 45 to 64; and 12.2% were 65 or older. The gender makeup was 48.7% male and 51.3% female.

=== 2000 census ===
As of the 2000 census, there were 29,172 people, 11,430 households, and 7,383 families residing in the city. The population density was 3,671.98 inhabitants per square mile (1,417.8/km^{2}). There were 11,598 housing units at an average density of 1,459.88 per square mile (563.7/km^{2}). The racial makeup of the city was 71.39% White, 14.09% African American, 0.87% Native American, 8.79% Asian, 0.01% Pacific Islander, 1.49% from some other races and 3.36% from two or more races. Hispanic or Latino people of any race were 2.82% of the population.

There were 11,430 households, of which 29.7% had children under the age of 18 living with them, 46.3% were married couples living together, 13.4% had a female householder with no husband present, and 35.4% were non-families. 28.2% of all households were made up of individuals, and 11.0% had someone living alone who was 65 years of age or older. The average household size was 2.52 and the average family size was 3.11.

In the city, the population was spread out, with 25.1% under the age of 18, 9.6% from 18 to 24, 30.1% from 25 to 44, 19.8% from 45 to 64, and 15.4% who were 65 or older. The median age was 35. For every 100 females, there were 94.9 males. For every 100 females age 18 and over, there were 91.8 males.

The city's median household income was $44,570, and the median family income was $52,006. Males had a median income of $36,031 versus $27,755 for females. The city's per capita income was $19,695. About 4.7% of families and 7.4% of the population were below the poverty line, including 10.7% of those under age 18 and 5.6% of those 65 or older.

== Economy ==
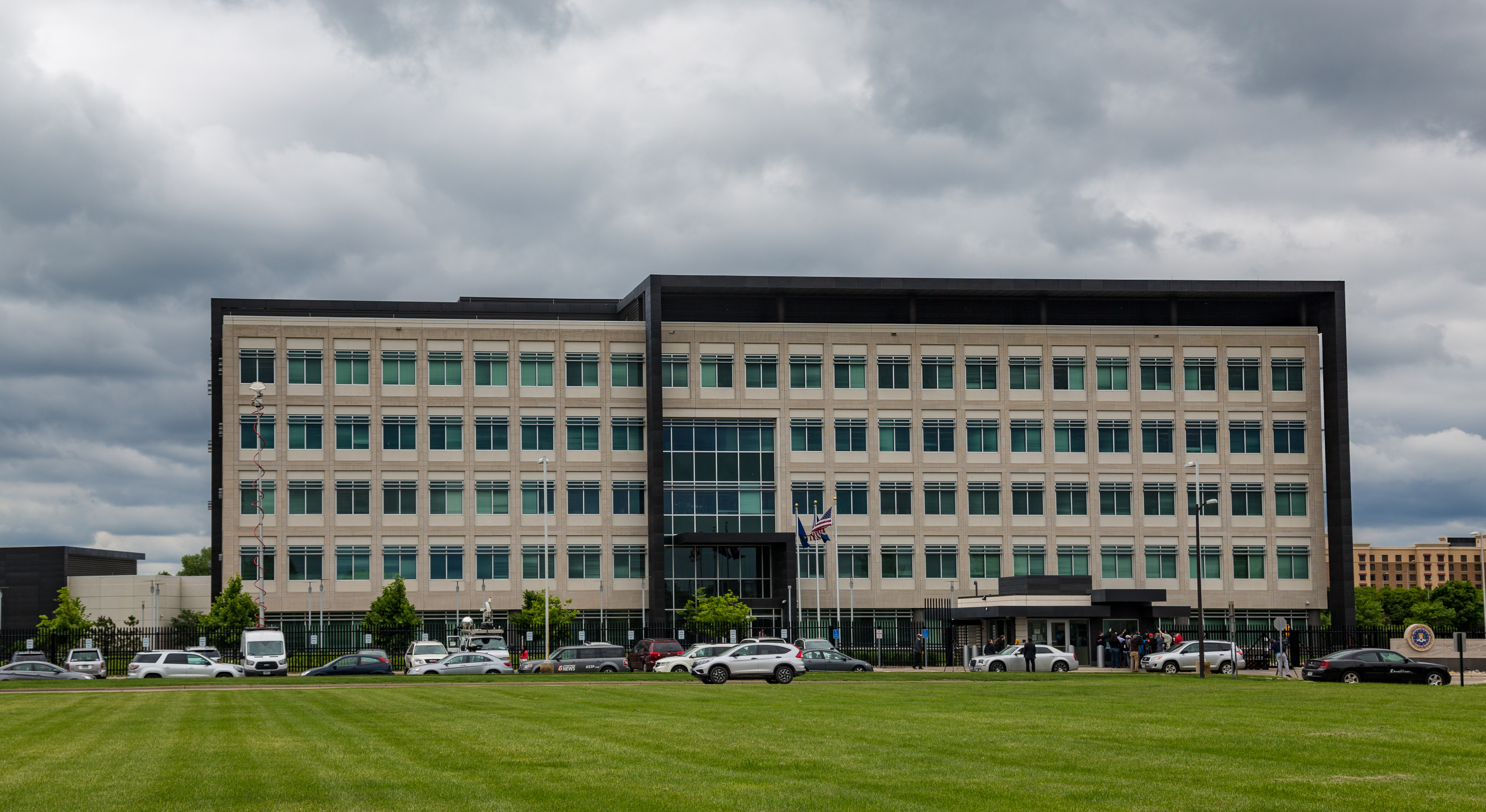
Federal Bureau of Investigation office in Brooklyn Center

Notable businesses include Surly Brewing Company, and Minnesota Martial Arts Academy, a mixed martial arts training center. The FBI's Minneapolis field office is located in Brooklyn Center.

=== Top employers ===
According to the City's 2022 Annual Comprehensive Financial Report, the largest employers in the city are:

#	Employer	# of Employees	Percentage
1	PROMEON Inc., A Division of Medtronic	1,100	7.65%
2	Luther Auto Group	555	3.86%
3	City of Brooklyn Center	398	2.77%
4	Brooklyn Center Schools ISD #286	396	2.75%
5	University of Minnesota Physicians	330	2.29%
6	Walmart	278	1.93%
7	Caribou Coffee Headquarters	240	1.67%
8	Presbyterian Homes, Maranatha Care Center	215	1.50%
9	Cass Screw Machine Products	124	0.86%
10	HealthPartners	97	0.67%
—	Total employers	3,733	25.96%

== Government ==
Brooklyn Center is in Minnesota's 5th congressional district.

Presidential election results 1960–2024

Precinct General Election Results
Year	Republican	Democratic	Third parties
2024	26.6% 3,391	70.8% 8,749	2.6% 325
2020	25.9% 3,609	71.6% 9,973	2.5% 352
2016	26.4% 3,321	65.7% 8,253	7.9% 987
2012	27.9% 3,783	69.7% 9,444	2.4% 332
2008	31.9% 4,238	66.0% 8,757	2.1% 279
2004	36.7% 5,047	62.0% 8,530	1.3% 173
2000	36.3% 4,740	56.9% 7,434	6.8% 897
1996	30.3% 3,884	58.8% 7,528	10.9% 1,388
1992	29.7% 4,606	48.3% 7,491	22.0% 3,420
1988	41.8% 6,067	58.2% 8,461	0.0% 0
1984	46.0% 7,385	54.0% 8,667	0.0% 0
1980	35.9% 5,881	55.1% 9,036	9.0% 1,483
1976	37.6% 6,257	60.8% 10,115	1.6% 272
1972	50.9% 7,512	46.9% 6,924	2.2% 315
1968	33.8% 4,239	61.9% 7,757	4.3% 535
1964	33.4% 3,833	66.4% 7,633	0.2% 26
1960	44.6% 4,605	55.1% 5,683	0.3% 27

== Infrastructure ==
=== Law enforcement ===
The Brooklyn Center Police Department was established in 1953, the city having previously had elected constables and appointed marshals. The department has about 47 sworn officers. The department is organized into a number of divisions and units.

=== Crime ===
Brooklyn Center
- Crime rates* (2025)

Violent crimes
- Homicide: 0
- Rape: 32
- Robbery: 40
- Aggravated assault: 89
- Total violent crime: 161

Property crimes
- Burglary: 71
- Larceny-theft: 647
- Motor vehicle theft: 109
- Arson: 0
- Total property crime: 827
- Note: Reported crimes per 100,000 population Source: 2025 FBI UCR Data

According to the Uniform Crime Report statistics compiled by the Federal Bureau of Investigation (FBI) in 2025, there were 161 violent crimes and 827 property crimes per 100,000 residents. Of these, the violent crimes consisted of 0 murder, 32 forcible rapes, 40 robberies and 89 aggravated assaults, while 71 burglaries, 647 larceny-thefts, 109 motor vehicle thefts and 0 acts of arson defined the property offenses.

== Notable people ==
- Dennie Gordon – TV/film director (Joe Dirt, What a Girl Wants, New York Minute)
- Marcus Harris – former college football player, and a Brooklyn Center High School alum, was an All-American wide receiver, played for the University of Wyoming, and won the 1996 Fred Biletnikoff Award as the best college wide receiver in the nation.
- Don Kramer – Minnesota state senator and businessman
- John Wingard - farmer and Minnesota state representative
