= John Wingard =

American politician (1927–2021)

Member of the Minnesota House of Representatives
- In office April 20, 1965 – January 1, 1973
- Preceded by: Linn Slattengren
- Succeeded by: Tad Jude
- Constituency: 30 (1965-1967); 13A (1967-1972)
- In office January 8, 1963 – April 20, 1965
- Preceded by: Redistricted
- Succeeded by: Linn Slattengren
- Constituency: 30

Personal details
- Born: John Phillip Wingard; August 26, 1927 Brooklyn Center, Minnesota, U.S.
- Died: June 10, 2021 (aged 93) Elk River, Minnesota, U.S.
- Party: Republican
- Children: 4
- Education: University of Minnesota
- Occupation: potato farmer

John Phillip Wingard Sr. (August 26, 1927 – June 10, 2021) was an American politician and farmer in the state of Minnesota. He served in the Minnesota House of Representatives from 1963 to 1973.

Wingard was born in Brooklyn Center, Minnesota and graduated from Brooklyn Park High School. He later moved to Champlin, Minnesota. Wingard received his bachelor's degree in history from the University of Minnesota in 1949. Wingard was a Republican. Wingard served as a justice of the peace for the city of Brooklyn Center from 1954 to 1962. He was a potato farmer and the owner of the Wingard Farms Potato Company.
