= Jeremiah Ellison =

American politician (born 1989)

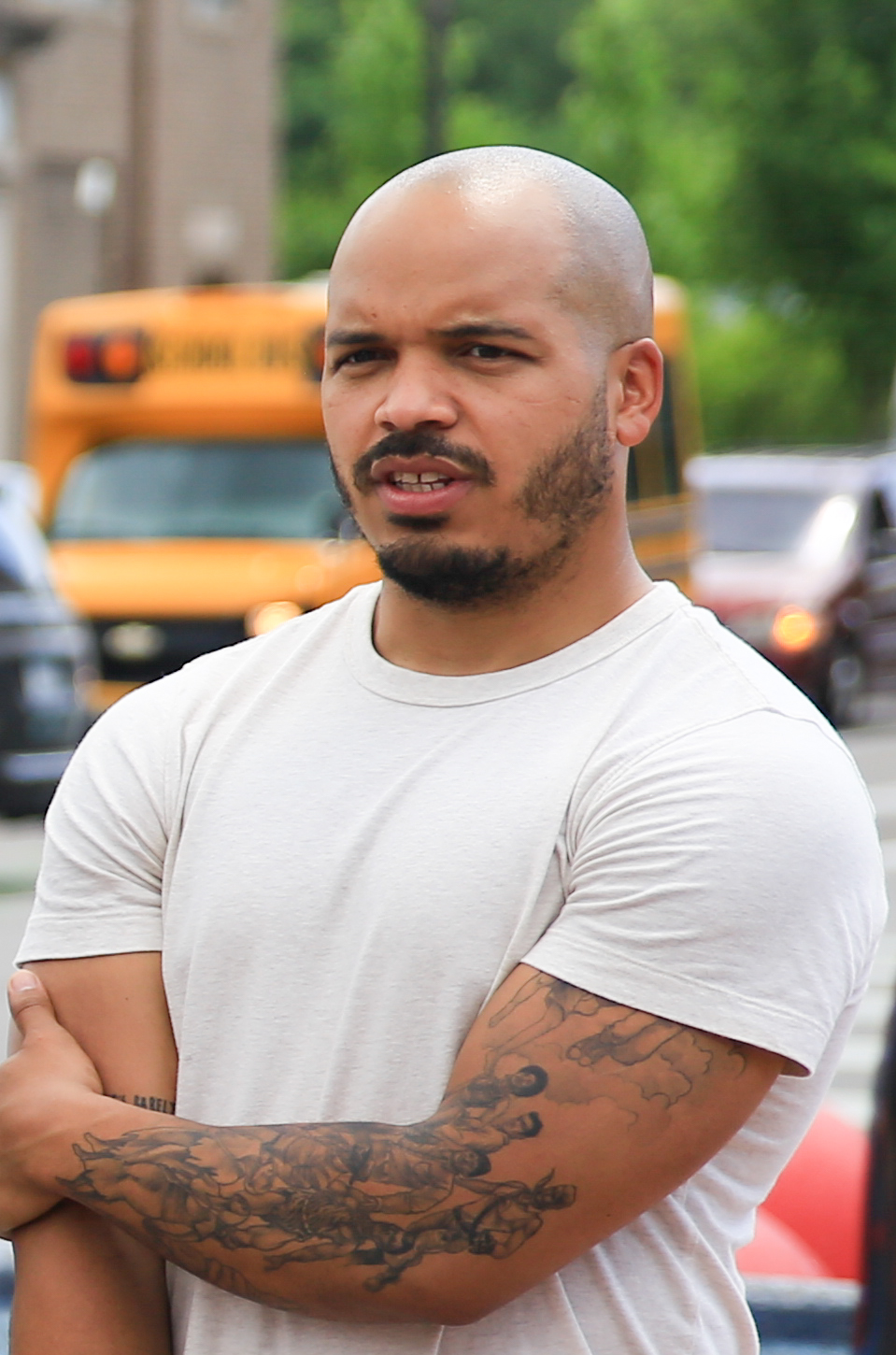
- Ellison in 2021

Member of the Minneapolis City Council from the 5th ward
- In office January 2, 2018 – January 6, 2026
- Preceded by: Blong Yang
- Succeeded by: Pearll Warren

Personal details
- Born: October 23, 1989 (age 36) Minneapolis, Minnesota, U.S.
- Party: Minnesota Democratic–Farmer–Labor Party
- Parent: Keith Ellison (father)

Jeremiah Bey Ellison (born October 23, 1989) is an American politician and artist who served on the Minneapolis City Council from 2018 to 2026, representing Ward 5. Ellison is a member of the Minnesota Democratic–Farmer–Labor Party. Minnesota Attorney General Keith Ellison, a former U.S. Representative, is his father.

== Early life ==
Ellison was born and raised on the north side of Minneapolis. His father is Keith Ellison, a former member of the United States House of Representatives serving as the Attorney General of Minnesota.

Ellison began attending Juxtaposition Arts at age six. For high school, Ellison attended The Blake School where he played football and graduated in 2008. After attending college for one year, Ellison dropped out to focus on his art. He paints murals, teaches art, and has worked on comic books.

== Career ==
Ellison was arrested at a 2013 protest for a $15 minimum hourly wage. He later became involved in the protests over the 2015 shooting of Jamar Clark. In December 2016, Ellison announced his candidacy for Minneapolis City Council in the November 2017 elections. Ellison defeated the incumbent councilmember, Blong Yang. As a councilmember, Ellison has advocated for greater protections for renters and has pushed the city to consider rent control. In 2020, Ellison spoke out against the murder of George Floyd and the actions taken by police in the subsequent George Floyd protests. As of 2024, Ellison serves as the vice chair of the Business, Housing & Zoning Committee and a member of the Administration & Enterprise Oversight Committee and Public Health & Safety Committee.

In August 2024, Ellison was an uncommitted delegate to the 2024 Democratic National Convention, where on the night of August 21 he took part in a sit-in protest demanding DNC leaders allow Palestinian voices to be heard on the convention floor.

In November 2024, Ellison announced that he would not seek re-election to the Minneapolis City Council.

In fall 2025, Ellison accepted a full-time in-person fellowship at Harvard University in Massachusetts while attending council meetings virtually.

== See also ==
- George Floyd protests in Minneapolis–Saint Paul
- Police abolition movement in Minneapolis
