= Victor N. Jude =

American businessman and politician

Victor Jude

Member of the Minnesota Senate from the 13th district
- In office January 3, 1967 – January 1, 1973
- Preceded by: Paul A. Thuet Jr.
- Succeeded by: Winston W. Borden

Member of the Minnesota House of Representatives
- In office January 8, 1957 – January 2, 1967

Personal details
- Born: March 11, 1923 Maple Lake, Minnesota, US
- Died: August 15, 1994 (aged 71) Saint Cloud, Minnesota, US
- Party: Democratic
- Children: 9, including Tad
- Education: University of Minnesota; Saint Thomas University

Military service
- Allegiance: United States
- Branch/service: United States Army
- Years of service: 1943–1945
- Battles/wars: World War II; European Theater; Battle of The Bulge
- Awards: Purple Heart; Bronze Star

Victor Nicholas Jude (March 11, 1923 – August 15, 1994) was an American businessman and politician. He ran a small business specializing in candy and tobacco products.

Victor was born in Maple Lake, Minnesota. He went to the Maple Lake public schools. He served in the United States Army during World War II. Victor went to the University of St. Thomas in Saint Paul, Minnesota, to the University of Minnesota, and the Minnesota College of Law. He owned and operated Jude Candy and Tobacco Company, which has since been renamed Jude Vending. Victor served in the Minnesota House of Representatives from 1957 to 1966 and in the Minnesota Senate from 1967 to 1972. He was a Democrat. Victor died from stomach cancer at a hospital in St. Cloud, Minnesota. His son Tad Jude also served in the Minnesota Legislature, and his brother, doctor James Jude, was one of the developers of cardiopulmonary resuscitation (CPR). Tad Jude was a candidate in the 2022 Minnesota Attorney General election.
