= Truman, Minnesota =

City in Minnesota, United States

- City
- Location in Martin County and the state of Minnesota
- Coordinates: 43°49′40″N 94°26′12″W
- Country: United States
- State: Minnesota
- County: Martin

Area
  - Total: 1.10 sq mi (2.85 km^{2})
  - Land: 1.10 sq mi (2.85 km^{2})
  - Water: 0 sq mi (0.00 km^{2})
- Elevation: 1,116 ft (340 m)

Population (2020)
  - Total: 1,092
  - Density: 993.6/sq mi (383.65/km^{2})
- Time zone: UTC-6 (Central (CST))
  - Summer (DST): UTC-5 (CDT)
- ZIP code: 56088
- Area code: 507
- FIPS code: 27-65668
- GNIS feature ID: 2397066
- Website: www.trumanmn.us

Truman is a city in Martin County, Minnesota, United States. The population was 1,092 at the 2020 census.

== History ==
Truman was platted in 1899. It was named for Truman Clark, the son of a railroad official. A post office has been in operation in Truman since 1899.

== Geography ==
Truman is in northeastern Martin County, 13 miles (21 km) north of Fairmont, the county seat, and 16 miles (26 km) south of Madelia. According to the U.S. Census Bureau, it has a total area of 1.10 square miles (2.85 km^{2}), all land.

Minnesota State Highway 15 serves as the main route in the city, crossing its east side.

== Climate ==
On April 13, 2026 at around 6:15 p.m. CDT, a tornado touched down roughly 2 miles (3.2 km) north of town heading east for roughly 8 miles (13 km), dissipating at approximately 6:40 p.m. The tornado struck 4 houses dealing damage with estimated maximum wind speeds of 90mph, earning it the rating of EF-1.

== Demographics ==
Historical population
Census	Pop.	Note	%±
1900	261		—
1910	451		72.8%
1920	752		66.7%
1930	730		−2.9%
1940	984		34.8%
1950	1,106		12.4%
1960	1,256		13.6%
1970	1,137		−9.5%
1980	1,392		22.4%
1990	1,292		−7.2%
2000	1,259		−2.6%
2010	1,115		−11.4%
2020	1,092		−2.1%
U.S. Decennial Census

=== 2010 census ===
As of the census of 2010, there were 1,115 people, 479 households, and 298 families living in the city. The population density was 1,022.9 inhabitants per square mile (394.9/km^{2}). There were 541 housing units at an average density of 496.3 per square mile (191.6/km^{2}). The racial makeup of the city was 97.6% White, 0.2% African American, 0.2% Native American, 0.6% Asian, 0.4% from other races, and 1.0% from two or more races. Hispanic or Latino of any race were 2.4% of the population.

There were 479 households, of which 29.4% had children under the age of 18 living with them, 48.9% were married couples living together, 9.2% had a female householder with no husband present, 4.2% had a male householder with no wife present, and 37.8% were non-families. 32.6% of all households were made up of individuals, and 18.2% had someone living alone who was 65 years of age or older. The average household size was 2.23 and the average family size was 2.79.

The median age in the city was 47.4 years. 23.5% of residents were under the age of 18; 5% were between the ages of 18 and 24; 19.3% were from 25 to 44; 26.8% were from 45 to 64; and 25.5% were 65 years of age or older. The gender makeup of the city was 48.6% male and 51.4% female.

=== 2000 census ===
As of the census of 2000, there were 1,259 people, 510 households, and 318 families living in the city. The population density was 1,160.1 inhabitants per square mile (447.9/km^{2}). There were 542 housing units at an average density of 499.4 per square mile (192.8/km^{2}). The racial makeup of the city was 99.21% White, 0.16% African American, 0.32% Native American, 0.08% Asian, and 0.24% from two or more races. Hispanic or Latino of any race were 0.56% of the population.

There were 510 households, out of which 26.3% had children under the age of 18 living with them, 52.5% were married couples living together, 7.6% had a female householder with no husband present, and 37.6% were non-families. 33.3% of all households were made up of individuals, and 20.0% had someone living alone who was 65 years of age or older. The average household size was 2.25 and the average family size was 2.90.

In the city, the population was spread out, with 22.9% under the age of 18, 5.2% from 18 to 24, 22.8% from 25 to 44, 21.1% from 45 to 64, and 28.0% who were 65 years of age or older. The median age was 44 years. For every 100 females, there were 86.2 males. For every 100 females age 18 and over, there were 75.6 males.

The median income for a household in the city was $35,000, and the median income for a family was $46,750. Males had a median income of $31,292 versus $20,850 for females. The per capita income for the city was $18,305. About 5.6% of families and 9.2% of the population were below the poverty line, including 13.5% of those under age 18 and 10.2% of those age 65 or over.

== Notable people ==
- William A. Hinton, Minnesota state senator
- Peter John Eli Peterson, Minnesota state representative, businessman, and farmer
