= Tad Jude =

American politician & lawyer (born 1951)

- Jude in 2026

Member of the Minnesota Senate from the 48th district
- In office January 3, 1983 – January 3, 1989
- Preceded by: Robert Ashbach
- Succeeded by: Pat McGowan

Member of the Minnesota House of Representatives from the 42A district
- In office January 2, 1973 – January 4, 1983
- Preceded by: John Wingard
- Succeeded by: Sidney Pauly

Personal details
- Born: Thaddeus Victor Jude; December 13, 1951 (age 74) St. Cloud, Minnesota, U.S.
- Party: Democratic (before 1992); Republican (1992–present)
- Spouse: Gail Jude (m. 1987; div. 2001)
- Relatives: Victor N. Jude (father); James Jude (uncle)
- Education: University of St. Thomas (BA); William Mitchell College of Law (JD)

Military service
- Branch/service: United States Army
- Years of service: 1971–1977
- Unit: United States Army Reserves

Thaddeus Victor Jude (born December 13, 1951) is an American politician and lawyer from Minnesota. He is a member of the Republican Party.

First elected to office in 1972, Jude has served in the Minnesota House of Representatives and in the Minnesota Senate. He also served on the Hennepin County Board of Commissioners from 1989 to 1993 and was a Minnesota District Court Judge from 2011 to 2021.

Jude was a candidate in the 2022 Minnesota Attorney General election but withdrew and endorsed Jim Schultz on May 13, 2022, after being eliminated at the convention. He then ran for Hennepin County Attorney that same year, finishing fourth in the primary.

Jude ran for Minnesota's 3rd congressional district in 2024. He lost the election to Kelly Morrison. In September 2025, Jude announced his candidacy for Minnesota Secretary of State in 2026; he lost to Steve Simon on November 3, 2026.

== Early life ==
Thaddeus Victor Jude was born on December 13, 1951, in St. Cloud, Minnesota. He is the oldest of 11 children of Ruth (Huisentruit) Jude and Victor N. Jude. He served in the United States Army Reserves from 1971 to 1977. Jude graduated from the University of St. Thomas and William Mitchell College of Law. He is a nephew of doctor James Jude, one of the developers of cardiopulmonary resuscitation (CPR).

== Political and legal career ==
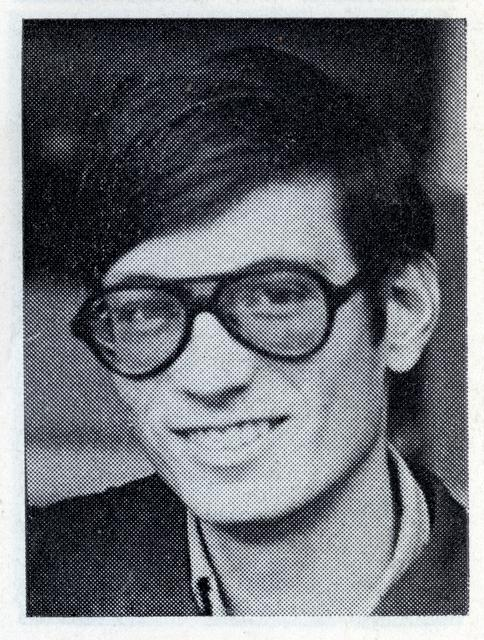
Jude as a state legislator in 1973

Jude was elected to the Minnesota Legislature at age 20 in 1972 and was sworn in at age 21. He was the youngest person ever elected to the legislature. His father, Victor N. Jude, also served in the Minnesota Legislature. In 1994, Jude ran for Minnesota's 6th congressional district. He lost the election to Bill Luther by 0.24%. He ran again in 1996 and lost to Luther by 11.82%. Jude was elected District Court Judge to Minnesota's 10th Judicial District in 2010, from a field of 24 candidates. He was reelected unopposed in 2016. He served as a judge on Minnesota's 10th Judicial District Court for ten years.

In 2022, he ran for Hennepin County Attorney, losing to Mary Moriarty.

== Legal experience ==
Jude is a 1977 graduate of William Mitchell College of Law. His employment includes legal work at the law firms of Jude and Guenningsman; Magsam and Harwig; and Trimble and Associates. He practiced workers' compensation law for the Special Compensation Fund. As a legislator, he chaired the House Judiciary Committee and the Senate Civil Justice division. He has served on the Hennepin County Law Library Board and as president of the Richard T. Oakes Inn of Court. His judicial education includes Law and Economics, Antonin Scalia Law School, and George Mason University.
