= Win Borden =

American politician (1943–2014)

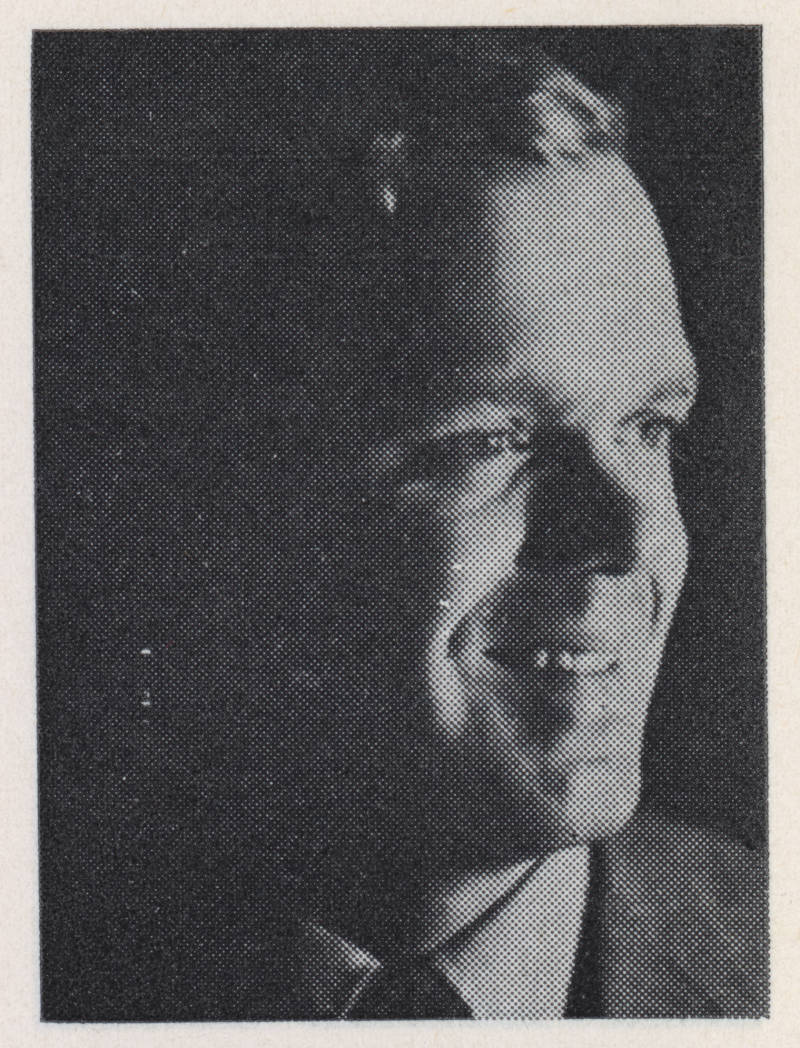

Member of the Minnesota Senate from the 13th district
- In office January 2, 1973 – January 1, 1979
- Preceded by: Victor N. Jude
- Succeeded by: David E. Rued

Member of the Minnesota Senate from the 53rd district
- In office January 5, 1971 – January 5, 1973

Personal details
- Born: September 1, 1943 Brainerd, Minnesota, U.S.
- Died: January 20, 2014 (aged 70) Brainerd, Minnesota, U.S.
- Party: DFL

Winston W. "Win" Borden (September 1, 1943 – January 20, 2014) was an American lawyer, businessman, and politician.

Born in Brainerd, Minnesota, Borden received his bachelor's degree from St. Cloud State University, his master's degree from University of Minnesota, and his law degree from University of Minnesota Law School. He practiced law, was a lobbyist, and owned a fish farm business. Borden served as a Democrat in the Minnesota State Senate from 1971 until 1978 when he resigned to work for the Minnesota Association of Commerce and Industry. He died in Brainerd, Minnesota.
