= Peter McGovern (politician) =

American politician

Peter McGovern was a member of the Minnesota Senate for the 13th district from January 5, 1875 to January 1, 1877.

== Biography ==
McGovern was born on October 9, 1845, in Watertown, Wisconsin. He died on November 15, 1917, in Waseca, Minnesota. McGovern received his law degree from the University of Wisconsin Law School and practiced law in Waseca, Minnesota.

== Career ==
McGovern was a member of the Senate twice. First, from 1875 to 1876, and second, from 1899 to 1902.
