= Wintersoft =

Wintersoft was a British software house based in Enfield, Middlesex and operated by John F. Humphreys and David A. Briskham during the 1980s. They produced a number of strategy games for the Dragon 32/64, Oric and ZX Spectrum computers, their titles including the role-playing video games The Ring of Darkness and its sequel Return of the Ring and also some products only released for the Dragon machines: Dragon Trek, Pepper's Game Pack, Artist's Designer and Juxtaposition: Barons of Ceti V, and a game only released for the Oric: Operation Gremlin.

Wintersoft's later games Juxtaposition and Return of the Ring were quite sophisticated for their time, featuring 3D graphics, advanced language parsers and a basic artificial intelligence system referred to as "Actel".

The much anticipated Wintersoft game, Usurper of Rune, the sequel to Juxtaposition, for the Dragon 32/64 was never released and no copy is known to exist. However fans of the series still wait in hope that it may one day surface.
