= Juxtaposition Arts =

Youth art center in North Minneapolis

Juxtaposition Arts is a youth oriented non-profit visual art center in North Minneapolis, Minnesota, known for community collaborations, studio classes and workshops, public mural programs, and art exhibitions.

== Mission ==
"Juxtaposition Arts develops community by engaging and employing young urban artists in hands-on education initiatives that create pathways to self-sufficiency while actualizing creative power."

== Information ==
Juxtaposition Arts was founded in 1995 by DeAnna Cummings, her husband Roger Cummings, and Peyton Scott Russell. The organization's mission is to empower youth and community to use the arts to actualize their full potential. It originated as an after-school program teaching airbrushing and graffiti art. JXTA's youth artists work with local organizations such to learn how to make money while embracing their passions.

Juxtaposition Arts provides visual arts literacy training and design based jobs for the youth in the community. This approach not only motivates the next generation of creative workers, but the production and output from these jobs that include murals, public art, graphic design, art installations, and clothing. They employ 70 artists ages 14 – 22 as art apprentices and teach free art classes for students ages 8 – 22.

It is in the middle of an $8.2 million, six-year expansion.

In 2019, Juxtaposition Arts partnered with City of Skate to build a "Skate-able Art Plaza" which included flexible open spaces, art installations, a skate plaza, and sustainable storm water management. This project received $50,000 in funding each from the Mississippi Watershed Management Organization, a Kickstarter, and Minnesota Super Bowl Host Committee Legacy Fund.

Bank of America funded both Juxtapostion Arts and Project for Pride in Living through a $400,000 grant in 2019.

In September 2021, the organization broke ground on a new building on its campus in North Minneapolis. In June 2023, the new building designed by 4RM+ULA was completed and opened. The new facility includes a library with public art-focused holdings from the donation of the Forecast Public Art Library. It also features a stormwater retention and reuse system that was supported with funding from the Mississippi Watershed Management Organization.

== Notable work ==
The Guthrie Theater in Minneapolis commissioned JXTA to create a work for its building as part of the theater's anti-racism commitments. The sculpture, "Luminous Current" by D’Angelo Raymond and Temesgen Besha, was installed in 2019 on the ninth floor. Raymond and Besha worked as artist apprentices under the guidance of lead designers and architects Niko Kubota and Sam Ero-Phillips. The glowing 40-foot long, 200-pound aluminum sculpture hangs from the ceiling and is meant to evoke the area where the theater is located between the Mississippi River and downtown Minneapolis.

In 2023, JXTA collaborated with Red Wing Shoes on a capsule collection that included a limited-edition boot and a hoodie. The collection sold out and proceeds supported programming for JXTA. The collaboration also featured a series of seven billboards in Minneapolis featuring art from apprentices, alumni, and friends of JXTA. While the billboards were temporary, the art can still be seen on an online map.

In May 2023, youth from Juxtaposition created a multimedia installation in the lobby of Orchestra Hall in downtown Minneapolis as part of the world premiere of brea(d)th by Carlos Simon and Marc Bamuthi Joseph to honor the struggle for racial justice.

Juxtaposition worked with the City of Brooklyn Center in 2023 on the design for a memorial to Daunte Wright, a 20-year-old Black man who was shot and killed during a traffic stop in the city in 2021.

The Minneapolis Park and Recreation Board (MPRB) worked with a group from JXTA's Environmental Design lab on a sculptural bike bridge that was installed in Hall Park in the Near North neighborhood in November 2023. JXTA apprentice Isaiah Hunter's design for a community table was selected by MPRB for the rebuilt pavilion at Bde Maka Ska, and the wood and steel table was installed in November 2023. Hunter worked with the fabrication company Concrete Pig on the table.

== Notable alumni ==
Minneapolis city council member Jeremiah Ellison got his start at Juxtaposition painting murals. Aaron Seymour-Anderson was an apprentice with JXTA in his youth, and in 2023 was Red Wing Shoe's head of brand and creative after working as a creative director for Nike. Ameen Taahir is a multidisciplinary artist from Brooklyn Park, MN who was in the JXTA Textile Lab in 2006-07. His designs were featured on tech accessories by Target in 2023.
