= William A. Hinton (politician) =

American politician (1862–1920)

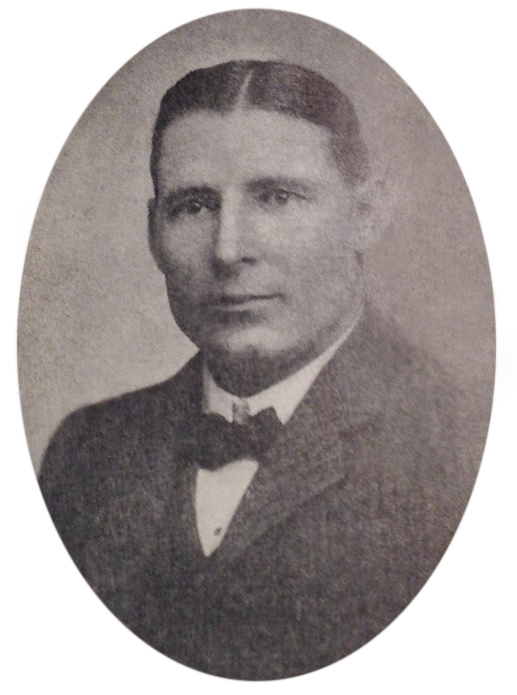
Hinton in 1909

William A. Hinton (1862 – 1920) was an American politician. A Republican, he served in the Minnesota Senate for the Thirteenth District in the 35th and 36th Legislative sessions, from 1907 to 1910.

== Biography ==
Born in Wisconsin in 1862, he moved to Minnesota in 1864. He worked as a merchant. He served in the Minnesota House of Representatives from 1903 to 1905. He also served as the town clerk of Nashville, Martin County for twelve years. His city of residence was Truman, Minnesota when elected which remained the same throughout his time in the Senate. He died in 1920 aged 58.
