= Riley Mahlman =

American football player (born 2002)

- Mahlman in 2024

No. 76 – Atlanta Falcons
- Position: Offensive tackle
- Roster status: Practice squad

Personal information
- Born: December 30, 2002 (age 23); Lakeville, Minnesota, U.S.
- Listed height: 6 ft 8 in (2.03 m)
- Listed weight: 308 lb (140 kg)

Career information
- High school: Lakeville South (Minnesota)
- College: Wisconsin (2021–2025)
- NFL draft: 2026: undrafted

Career history
- Atlanta Falcons (2026–present)*
- * Offseason or practice squad member only
- Stats at Pro Football Reference

Riley Mahlman (born December 30, 2002) is an American professional football offensive tackle for the Atlanta Falcons of the National Football League (NFL). He played college football for the Wisconsin Badgers and he was signed as an undrafted free agent by the Falcons in 2026.

== Early life ==
Mahlman grew up in Lakeville, Minnesota and attended Lakeville South High School, where he lettered in football and basketball. He was a four-star rated recruit and committed to play college football for the University of Wisconsin–Madison over offers from Iowa, Iowa State, Michigan State, Minnesota, Nebraska, Northwestern and Ohio State.

== College career ==
During Mahlman's true freshman season in 2021, he played in only one game against Rutgers and was ultimately redshirted. During the 2022 season, he played in seven games and started six of them at right tackle and finished the season with allowing only one sack. During the 2023 season, he played in and started all 13 games at right tackle.

Mahlman was named as an offensive tackle to know ahead of the 2025 NFL draft by Pro Football Focus.

== Professional career ==
Pre-draft measurables
Height	Weight	Arm length	Hand span	Wingspan	20-yard shuttle	Three-cone drill	Vertical jump	Broad jump	Bench press
6 ft 8 3/8 in (2.04 m)	308 lb (140 kg)	32 1/4 in (0.82 m)	9 1/8 in (0.23 m)	6 ft 7 1/2 in (2.02 m)	4.59 s	7.69 s	30.0 in (0.76 m)	8 ft 10 in (2.69 m)	17 reps
All values from Pro Day

Mahlman was signed as an undrafted free agent by the Atlanta Falcons after the conclusion of the 2026 NFL draft. On August 30, 2026, Mahlman was waived by the Falcons as a part of final roster cuts; he was re-signed to the team's practice squad the next day.
