= Justin Kloos =

American ice hockey player (born 1993)

- Born: November 30, 1993 (age 32) Lakeville, Minnesota, U.S.
- Height: 5 ft 9 in (175 cm)
- Weight: 180 lb (82 kg; 12 st 12 lb)
- Position: Forward
- Shoots: Right
- SHL team Former teams: HV71; Minnesota Wild; Anaheim Ducks; Torpedo Nizhny Novgorod; Leksands IF
- NHL draft: Undrafted
- Playing career: 2017–present

Justin Kloos (born November 30, 1993) is an American professional ice hockey forward. He is currently playing with HV71 in the Swedish Hockey League (SHL). He has previously played in the National Hockey League with the Minnesota Wild and Anaheim Ducks.

== Playing career ==
=== Junior ===
Kloos played for Lakeville South High School from 2007 to 2012. In 2011–12, his senior season, he helped his team make a Minnesota State Hockey Tournament appearance. He also scored 103 points (41G, 62A) in 31 games in his final season with the Lakeville South Cougars. In 2012 he was also named Minnesota Mr. Hockey. Kloos also played Junior hockey in the USHL (United States Hockey League) for the Waterloo Blackhawks in the 2012–13 season. He finished second in the USHL with 87. Of those 87 points, 58 of them were assists, which is the second most in Waterloo history.

=== College ===
In 2013, Kloos played his first season with the Minnesota Gophers. In his freshman season he played in 39 games and scored 16 goals. With these 16 goals he became the first freshman to lead the team in goals since 2006–07 season. Along with the 16 goals, Kloos also tallied 16 assists. In the NCAA tournament Kloos scored the game-winning goal to send the Gophers to the NCAA Frozen Four. In the 2014-15 season, he also played in 39 games. He scored 13 goals and recorded 19 assists. He scored the game-winning goal in victory over Michigan to secure the Big Ten Championship. In his junior season (2015–16) he was named the team captain. On February 16, 2016 he was named the Big Ten's First star of the week after he netted two goal and two assists against Ohio State. In his senior and final season with the Gophers in 2016–17, Kloos matched his previous seasons totals in points with 43 in 38 games.

=== Professional ===
At the conclusion of the Gophers season and his collegiate career, Kloos as an unsigned free agent agreed to terms with home state club, the Minnesota Wild on a two-year entry-level contract on March 29, 2017. He immediately joined AHL affiliate, the Iowa Wild to play out the remainder of the 2016–17 season on an amateur try-out basis. Kloos was called up to the NHL on October 23, 2017, and made his NHL debut on October 24, 2017. He played 8:38 minutes in his NHL debut against the Vancouver Canucks but was reassigned to the AHL the following day.

In the 2018–19 season, Kloos continued in the AHL, leading the Iowa Wild in scoring with 12 goals and 30 points in 34 games. On January 16, 2019, Kloos was traded by the Minnesota Wild to the Anaheim Ducks in exchange for Pontus Åberg.

With the conclusion of his contract with the Ducks approaching after the cancellation of the 2019–20 AHL season due to COVID-19. Kloos ended his tenure with affiliate, the San Diego Gulls posting 30 points in 53 games.

Kloos opted to embark on a career away from North America, agreeing to a one-year contract with Russian outfit, Torpedo Nizhny Novgorod of the Kontinental Hockey League (KHL), on June 8, 2020. In the 2020–21 season, Kloos quickly transitioned to the larger ice, producing 11 goals and 20 points through 48 regular season games.

As a free agent, Kloos moved to Sweden agreeing to a two-year contract with SHL club, Leksands IF, on June 4, 2021.

Following four seasons in the SHL with Leksands IF, Kloos left out of contract to sign a two-year deal with fellow Swedish club, HV71, on July 2, 2025.

== Career statistics ==
			Regular season					Playoffs
Season	Team	League	GP	G	A	Pts	PIM	GP	G	A	Pts	PIM
2009–10	Lakeville South High	USHS	18	21	17	38	2	3	4	3	7	0
2010–11	Lakeville South High	USHS	24	35	44	79	8	3	6	5	11	0
2010–11	Waterloo Black Hawks	USHL	10	3	2	5	2	2	0	0	0	0
2011–12	Lakeville South High	USHS	25	34	47	81	4	3	5	13	18	0
2011–12	Waterloo Black Hawks	USHL	2	2	2	4	0	—	—	—	—	—
2012–13	Waterloo Black Hawks	USHL	54	29	58	87	22	5	0	4	4	2
2013–14	University of Minnesota	B1G	41	16	16	32	16	—	—	—	—	—
2014–15	University of Minnesota	B1G	39	13	19	32	26	—	—	—	—	—
2015–16	University of Minnesota	B1G	37	16	27	43	26	—	—	—	—	—
2016–17	University of Minnesota	B1G	38	18	25	43	28	—	—	—	—	—
2016–17	Iowa Wild	AHL	9	1	0	1	4	—	—	—	—	—
2017–18	Iowa Wild	AHL	76	19	31	50	42	—	—	—	—	—
2017–18	Minnesota Wild	NHL	1	0	0	0	2	—	—	—	—	—
2018–19	Iowa Wild	AHL	34	12	18	30	26	—	—	—	—	—
2018–19	Anaheim Ducks	NHL	1	0	0	0	0	—	—	—	—	—
2018–19	San Diego Gulls	AHL	25	6	9	15	10	16	3	6	9	2
2019–20	San Diego Gulls	AHL	53	11	19	30	34	—	—	—	—	—
2020–21	Torpedo Nizhny Novgorod	KHL	48	11	9	20	22	2	0	0	0	0
2021–22	Leksands IF	SHL	45	9	13	22	18	3	1	1	2	0
2022–23	Leksands IF	SHL	43	13	14	27	18	3	0	4	4	0
2023–24	Leksands IF	SHL	37	7	17	24	10	5	0	1	1	0
2024–25	Leksands IF	SHL	52	18	15	33	14	—	—	—	—	—
NHL totals			2	0	0	0	2	—	—	—	—	—
KHL totals			48	11	9	20	22	2	0	0	0	0
SHL totals			177	47	59	106	60	11	1	6	7	0

== Awards and honors ==
Award	Year
USHS
Minnesota Mr. Hockey	2012
USHL
USHL/NHL Top Prospects Game	2013
First All-Star Team	2013
College
West Regional Most Outstanding Player	2014
B1G Second All-Star Team	2016
B1G First All-Star Team	2017
