= Lakeville North High School =

Public high school in northern Lakeville, Minnesota, United States

Location
- 19600 Ipava Avenue; Lakeville, Minnesota; United States; 44.666486°N 93.260043°W

Information
- Type: Public high school
- Established: 1906; 120 years ago
- School district: Independent School District 194
- Superintendent: James Baumann
- CEEB code: 241325
- NCES School ID: 271778000817
- Principal: Kimberly Budde
- Teaching staff: 82.05 (FTE)
- Grades: 9–12
- Enrollment: 1,871 (2024–2025)
- Student to teacher ratio: 22.80
- Colors: Red, White
- Song: Wave the Flag
- Mascot: Panther
- Newspaper: The North Star
- Yearbook: Panthera
- Feeder schools: Century Middle School, Kenwood Trail Middle School, formerly Kenwood Trail Junior High
- Website: lnhs.isd194.org

Lakeville North High School (LNHS) is a public high school in northern Lakeville, Minnesota, United States. Formerly Lakeville Senior High School, LNHS received its current name when a second high school, Lakeville South High School, was built. Grades 9–12 attend the school, and its principal is Kim Budde.

The school is a member of Minnesota Independent School District 194 (Lakeville Area Public Schools), and is affiliated with the Minnesota State High School League (MSHSL). The school is a member of the South Suburban Conference (Minnesota). During the 2009-10 school year, Lakeville North High School was recognized with the Blue Ribbon School Award of Excellence by the United States Department of Education, the highest award an American school can receive.

== School facilities ==
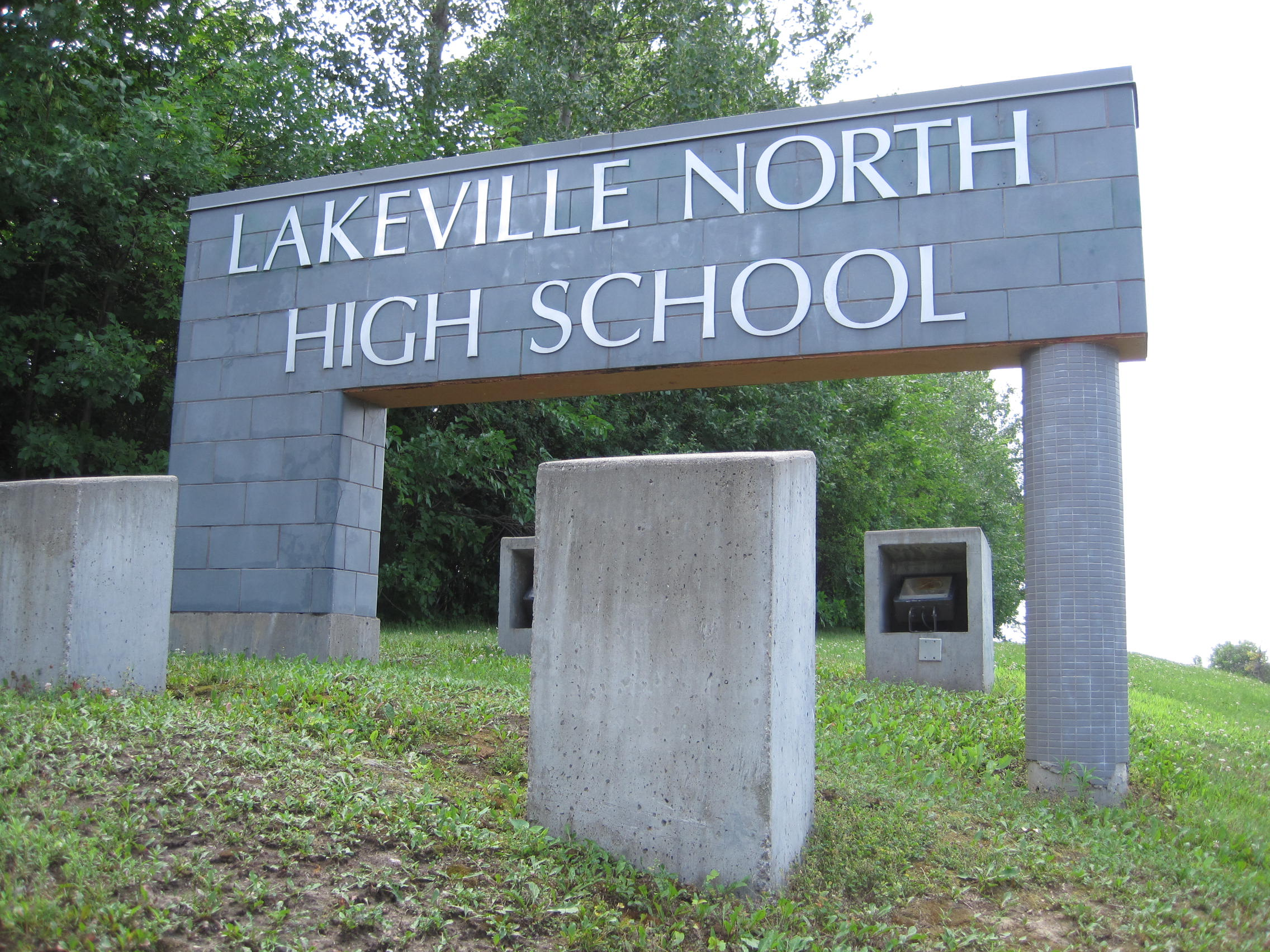
The sign near the entrance to the lower doors.

The current Lakeville North High School was completed in 1993 and designed by Wold Architects and Engineers.

== Demographics ==
As of 2019, 83 percent of the students were White, 6 percent were Asian, and Black and Hispanic students had 4 percent each.

== Academics ==
Lakeville North High School offers 21 Advanced Placement (A.P.) classes in various subjects including Art History, Calculus, Biology, English Literature, Language Composition, Chemistry, European History, U.S. History, World History, Psychology, Music Theory, Macroeconomics, Microeconomics, Studio Art, Human Geography, Statistics, Physics, Environmental Science, and American Government. Advanced placement exams are held at the end of the year; students who receive a passing grade earn college credits. They are also weighted on a 5.0 scale.

Students are also given the opportunity to earn college credits and high school credits at the same time if they are a junior or senior in high school through Post Secondary. This is where students take courses at a nearby, participating college or university; as of 2011 the offered schools included Normandale Community College, Inver Hills Community College, Dakota County Technical College, and the University of Minnesota. The students must meet the admission requirement first to take these courses. In the past, school administrators have raised controversy by stating that the Post-Secondary Education Option (PSEO) was a way for students who operated poorly in traditional academic settings to pursue options in local community colleges, operating in direct contradiction to the State of Minnesota's PSEO laws. In accordance with school policy, letter grades are not given to students choosing to pursue this option.

Lakeville has done very well in terms of standardized testing and improvement in education and were awarded the Blue Ribbon School of Excellence in 2009. In 2010 it was ranked at number 769 on Newsweek's annual list of America's Best High Schools.

== Co-curricular activities ==
Lakeville North Students are able to participate in many extracurricular activities including: Band, Choir, Debate, DECA, Link Crew, Math League, Mock Trial, Science Olympiad, Speech, Student Council, Drama Theater, and Youth in Government.

=== Student-Run Clubs ===
Students at Lakeville North High School can join student run clubs including: All For One Club, Art Club, Asian-American Connections, Athletic Training Club, Best Buddies, Bible Study Club, Black Student Union, Board Game Club, Book Club, Chess Club, Code Club, Creative Writing Club, E-Sports Club, Faith Club, French Club, Health & Wellness Club, Kawanis Educational Foundation (Key Club), Letters Of Love Club, Muslim Student Association, Literary Magazine Club, Panther Prep, Pickleball Club, Students Against Destructive Decisions (SADD), Straights & Gays for Equality (SAGE), Spanish Club, Student Voices, Table Tennis Club, and Table-Top Gaming Club.

=== Marching Band ===
The Panther Football Marching Band was invited to and marched in the 2007 Tournament of Roses Parade, as well as parades in Philadelphia, Texas, Florida, and at the parade for the second inauguration of George W. Bush. The band's current director is Doctor Matthew Wanken.

== Notable alumni ==
- J. P. Macura, Canton Charge Guard, former Xavier Musketeers standout
- Brady Skjei, Carolina Hurricanes Defenseman (attended first two years of high school)
- Regan Smith, World-record holding swimmer
- Rachel Banham, Minnesota Lynx Guard, basketball player
- Nate Reuvers, Valencia Basket Forward, former Wisconsin Badgers 1000 point scorer
- Charlie Lindgren, Goalie, Washington Capitals
- Ryan Poehling, Forward, Anaheim Ducks
- Kevin Kaesviharn, Safety, Cincinnati Bengals
- Jake Oettinger, Goalie, Dallas Stars
- Jeff Braun, Music Engineer, CMA Nominee
- Tyler Wahl, basketball player
