= Brady Skjei =

American ice hockey player (born 1994)

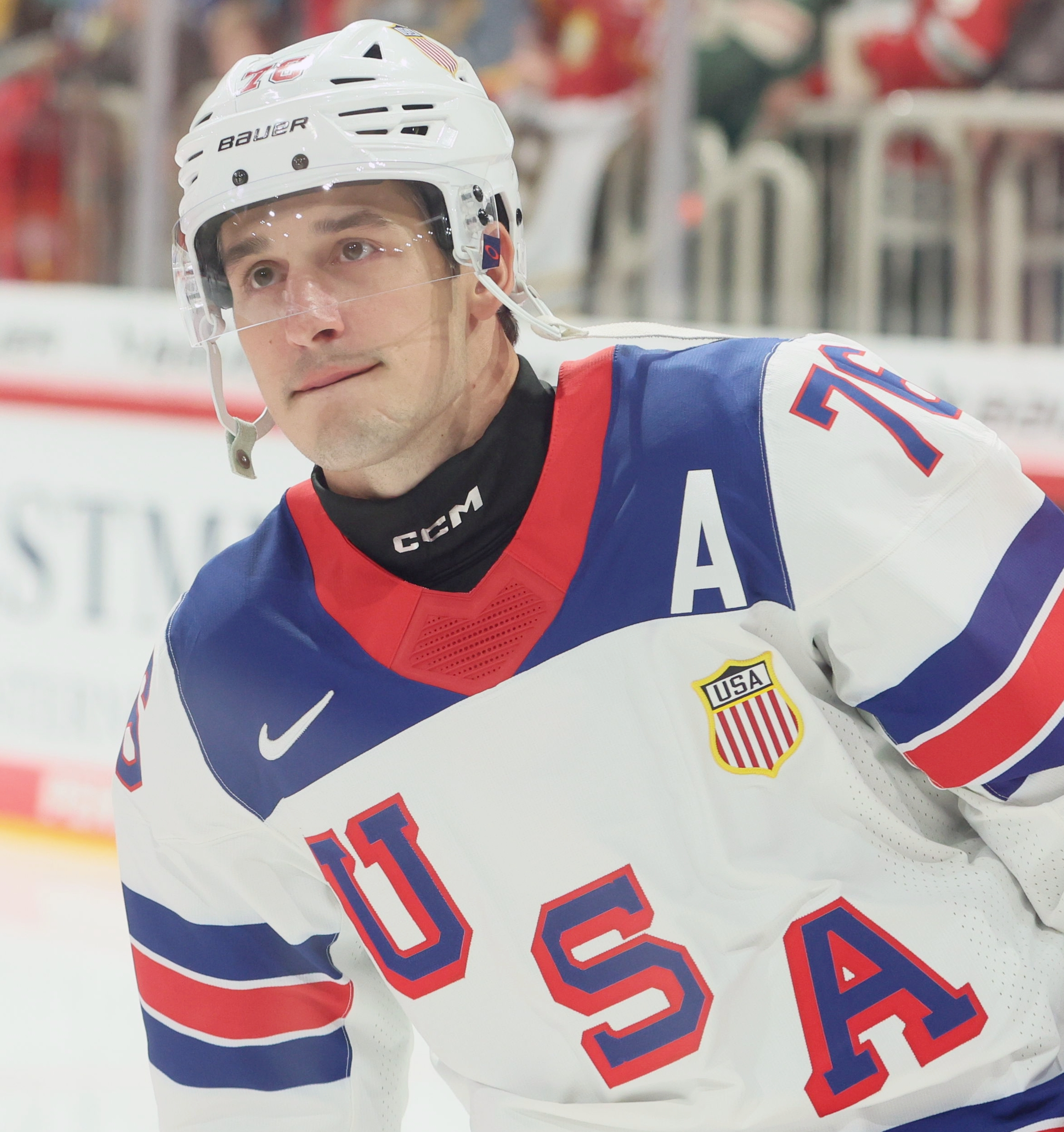
- Skjei with the United States national team in 2025
- Born: March 26, 1994 (age 32) Lakeville, Minnesota, U.S.
- Height: 6 ft 3 in (191 cm)
- Weight: 210 lb (95 kg; 15 st 0 lb)
- Position: Defense
- Shoots: Left
- NHL team Former teams: Nashville Predators; New York Rangers; Carolina Hurricanes
- National team: United States
- NHL draft: 28th overall, 2012; New York Rangers
- Playing career: 2015–present

Brady Michael Skjei (English: /ˈʃeɪ/ SHAY; born March 26, 1994) is an American professional ice hockey player who is a defenseman for the Nashville Predators of the National Hockey League (NHL). He was selected by the New York Rangers in the first round, 28th overall, in the 2012 NHL entry draft.

Prior to joining the University of Minnesota, Skjei played for the USA Hockey National Team Development Program, based out of Michigan, and he represents the United States in international play.

== Playing career ==
=== Amateur ===
Skjei played two seasons of high school hockey in Minnesota for the Lakeville North Panthers. In his first season with the team, he was named Rookie of the Year, and in his second he was named the team's Most Valuable Player. For his final two years of high school, Skjei played with the USA Hockey National Team Development Program, based out of Michigan. He spent one season with the Under-17 team, and one with the Under-18 team. After his final season with the National Team Development Program, Skjei was selected by the New York Rangers in the first round of the 2012 NHL entry draft. During his freshman season at the University of Minnesota, Skjei played in 36 games, recording one goal and two assists.

=== Professional ===
==== New York Rangers ====
Skjei signed a contract with the New York Rangers on April 1, 2015. He reported to the Hartford Wolf Pack of the AHL on an amateur tryout to finish the 2014–15 season. Skjei scored his first professional goal (and point) in a Calder Cup playoff game against the Providence Bruins on April 26, 2015.

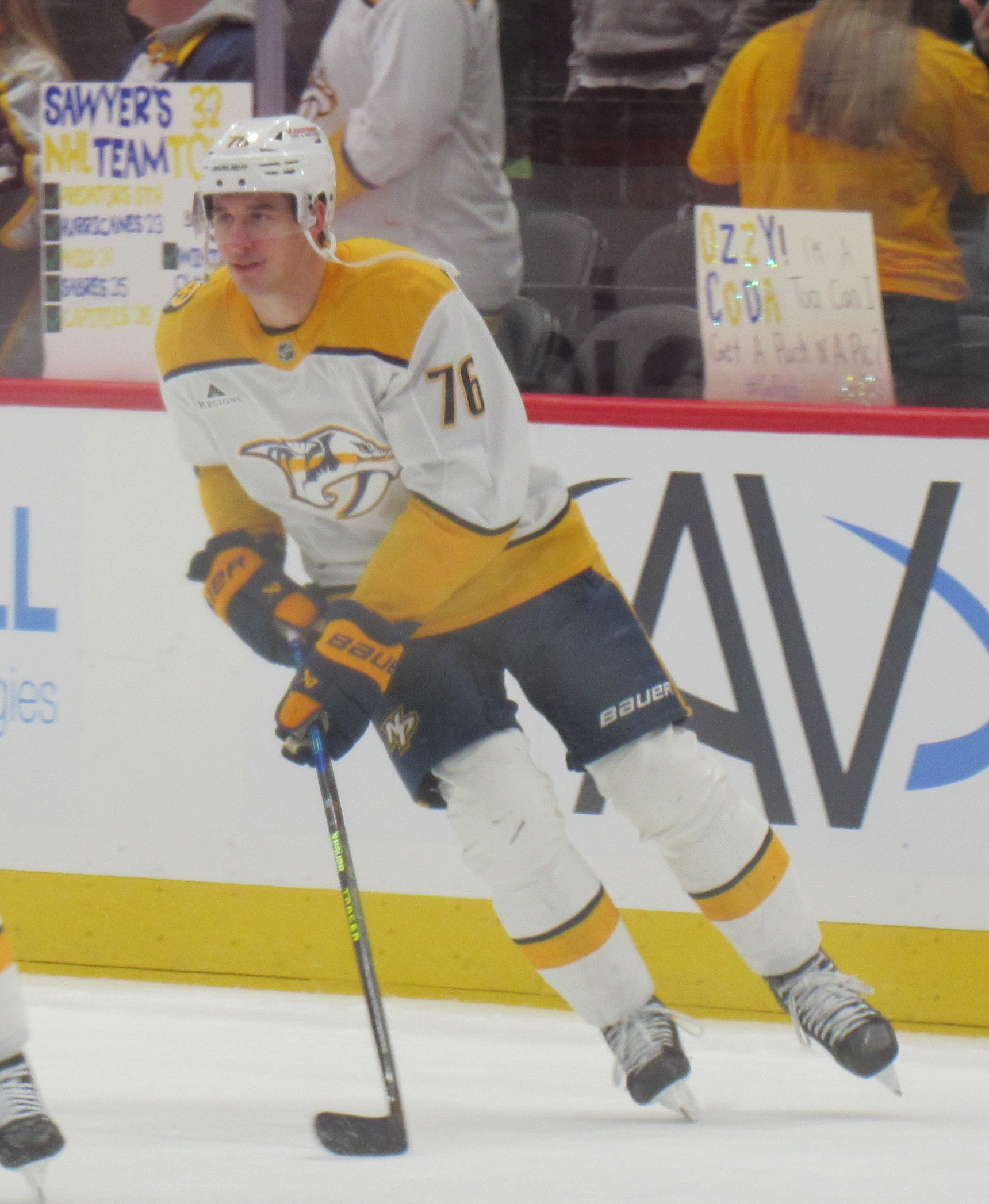
Skjei with the Predators in 2026

He was promoted to the Rangers from Hartford on December 15, 2015, after recording 2 goals and 9 assists in 27 games for the Wolf Pack to start the 2015–16 season. Injuries to various New York Rangers' defenseman increased Skjei's ice time, but he failed to score any points in the 7 regular season games he played for the team. In the playoffs, Skjei recorded two assists as the Rangers were eliminated in the first round in 5 games by the Pittsburgh Penguins. On December 11, 2016, Skjei scored his first NHL goal against the New Jersey Devils. On April 16, 2017, he scored his first career playoff goal against the Montreal Canadiens. On April 29, 2017, Skjei had his first multiple-goal game, when he scored two goals against the Ottawa Senators in the 2017 Stanley Cup playoffs. However, he and teammate Brendan Smith were benched during the final 2 minutes of regulation in place of Nick Holden and Marc Staal as the Rangers would go on to lose the game in overtime despite leading 5–3. On June 21, 2017, Skjei was named to the NHL's 2017 All-Rookie team.

Returning for his sophomore 2017–18 season, the Rangers struggled as a team, announcing a team rebuild in February. Skjei would see his points total dip to 25, but also a significant increase in ice time following the trade of team captain Ryan McDonagh. After his second season, Skjei signed a six-year deal with the Rangers on July 28, 2018.

==== Carolina Hurricanes ====
On February 24, 2020, Skjei was traded to the Carolina Hurricanes in exchange for a 2020 first-round pick.

==== Nashville Predators ====
Following five seasons with the Hurricanes, having established himself as a top-pairing two-way defenseman, Skjei left Carolina as a free agent and was signed to a seven-year, $49 million contract with the Nashville Predators on July 1, 2024.

== International play ==
Medal record

Representing United States

Ice hockey

World Championships
Gold medal – first place	2025 Sweden/Denmark	

Skjei represents the United States in international play. His first taste of international hockey was at the 2011 World U-17 Hockey Challenge, where he recorded one goal and three assists in 6 games, while helping the US to a second-place finish. In 2012, Skjei played in several tournaments with the American Under-18 team, including the 2012 IIHF World U18 Championships, capturing a gold medal in the first International Ice Hockey Federation sanctioned tournament he played in. He attended the American evaluation camp in preparation for the 2013 World Junior Championship, but was not selected for the final team. Skjei was selected to the American team for the 2014 World Junior Tournament.

Skjei represented the United States at the 2025 IIHF World Championship, where he recorded one goal and two assists in ten games and helped Team USA win their first gold medal since 1933.

== Personal life ==
Skjei is of Norwegian descent. While attending Lakeville North High School in Minnesota, Skjei played quarterback on the varsity football team and was also a member of the golf team. His grandfather played football at the University of Minnesota.

In early August 2021, Skjei married his longtime girlfriend, Gracia Bonesho. On May 28th, 2025, it was revealed that the couple was expecting a child. Their son, Baker, was born in late October.

== In popular culture ==
Skjei was portrayed by Alex Moffat in the November 18, 2017, episode of Saturday Night Live, hosted by Chance the Rapper. Skjei was reported to have enjoyed the sketch, which poked fun at the pronunciation of his surname.

== Career statistics ==
=== Regular season and playoffs ===
			Regular season					Playoffs
Season	Team	League	GP	G	A	Pts	PIM	GP	G	A	Pts	PIM
2008–09	Lakeville North High	SSC	25	2	12	14	6	—	—	—	—	—
2009–10	Lakeville North High	SSC	25	7	16	23	24	5	4	2	6	6
2010–11	U.S. NTDP Juniors	USHL	36	1	5	6	14	2	0	0	0	0
2010–11	U.S. NTDP U17	USDP	55	5	14	19	24	—	—	—	—	—
2011–12	U.S. NTDP Juniors	USHL	24	3	9	12	12	—	—	—	—	—
2011–12	U.S. NTDP U18	USDP	60	4	19	23	36	—	—	—	—	—
2012–13	University of Minnesota	WCHA	36	1	2	3	14	—	—	—	—	—
2013–14	University of Minnesota	B1G	40	6	8	14	30	—	—	—	—	—
2014–15	University of Minnesota	B1G	33	1	9	10	32	—	—	—	—	—
2014–15	Hartford Wolf Pack	AHL	8	0	0	0	0	15	1	2	3	16
2015–16	Hartford Wolf Pack	AHL	68	4	24	28	36	—	—	—	—	—
2015–16	New York Rangers	NHL	7	0	0	0	4	5	0	2	2	2
2016–17	New York Rangers	NHL	80	5	34	39	42	12	4	1	5	10
2017–18	New York Rangers	NHL	82	4	21	25	39	—	—	—	—	—
2018–19	New York Rangers	NHL	78	8	17	25	44	—	—	—	—	—
2019–20	New York Rangers	NHL	60	8	15	23	41	—	—	—	—	—
2019–20	Carolina Hurricanes	NHL	7	0	1	1	4	8	0	2	2	4
2020–21	Carolina Hurricanes	NHL	52	3	7	10	30	11	0	0	0	8
2021–22	Carolina Hurricanes	NHL	82	9	30	39	48	14	1	2	3	8
2022–23	Carolina Hurricanes	NHL	81	18	20	38	40	15	1	3	4	12
2023–24	Carolina Hurricanes	NHL	80	13	34	47	40	11	1	8	9	6
2024–25	Nashville Predators	NHL	82	10	23	33	42	—	—	—	—	—
2025–26	Nashville Predators	NHL	82	3	23	26	40	—	—	—	—	—
NHL totals			773	81	225	306	414	76	7	18	25	50

=== International ===
Year	Team	Event	Result	GP	G	A	Pts	PIM
2011	United States	U17	2nd place, silver medalist(s)	5	1	2	3	0
2012	United States	U18	1st place, gold medalist(s)	6	0	1	1	4
2014	United States	WJC	5th	5	0	1	1	0
2016	United States	WC	4th	10	1	0	1	2
2017	United States	WC	5th	3	0	1	1	0
2019	United States	WC	7th	8	2	0	2	2
2025	United States	WC	1st place, gold medalist(s)	10	1	2	3	4
Junior totals				16	1	4	5	4
Senior totals				31	4	3	7	8

Awards and achievements
Preceded by J. T. Miller	New York Rangers first-round draft pick 2012	Succeeded by Lias Andersson
