= Independent School District 194 =

School district in Minnesota, United States

Lakeville Area Public Schools

Address
- 8670 210th Street West Lakeville, Minnesota, 55044; United States

District information
- Type: Public
- Motto: Learning for a Lifetime
- Grades: K-12
- Established: 1878; 148 years ago
- Superintendent: Lisa Snyder
- Budget: $3,393,775 (2008-09)
- NCES District ID: 2717780

Students and staff
- Enrollment: 11,275 (2020-2021)
- Staff: 684.65 (on an FTE basis)
- Student–teacher ratio: 16.47

Other information
- Website: www.isd194.org

Independent School District 194 is a state and nationally recognized K-12 public school district located in Lakeville, Minnesota.

Also known as the Lakeville School District, District 194 serves approximately 11,084 students in grades Early Childhood-12 and is one of the fastest growing school districts in Minnesota. The district boundary covers 86 square miles (220 km^{2}) and includes Lakeville, Elko New Market, part of Burnsville and rural Credit River, Eureka and New Market townships.

District 194 has eight elementary schools (grades K-5), three middle schools (grades 6–8), and two high schools (grades 9–12). District 194 offers preschool, ECFE, before and after school care, and general youth and adult classes through Community Education.

== District 194 Schools ==
There are 14 schools in ISD194 excluding link12. The District also has a state certified online school called LinK12 Lakeville that educates students in grades K-12 from all across the state.

=== District 194 high schools ===
Both District 194 high schools compete in the South Suburban Conference of the Minnesota State High School League.

- Lakeville North High School
- Lakeville South High School
- Lakeville Area Learning Center (alternative)

=== District 194 middle schools ===
There are 3 middle schools in the Lakeville Area Middle Schools, all of which compete in the National Geographic GeoBee.

- Kenwood Trail Middle School
- Century Middle School
- McGuire Middle School

=== District 194 elementary schools ===
- Cherry View Elementary School
- Christina Huddleston Elementary School
- Eastview Elementary School
- Highview Elementary School
- John F. Kennedy Elementary School
- Lakeview Elementary School
- Lake Marion Elementary School
- Oak Hills Elementary School
- Orchard Lake Elementary School

=== District 194 Pre-K-Kindergarten & Community Education ===
All are found at Crystal Lake Education Center

- Small Wonders Preschool
- Early Childhood Family Education
- Community Education

== See also ==
- List of school districts in Minnesota
