= Sam Malinski =

American ice hockey player (born 1998)

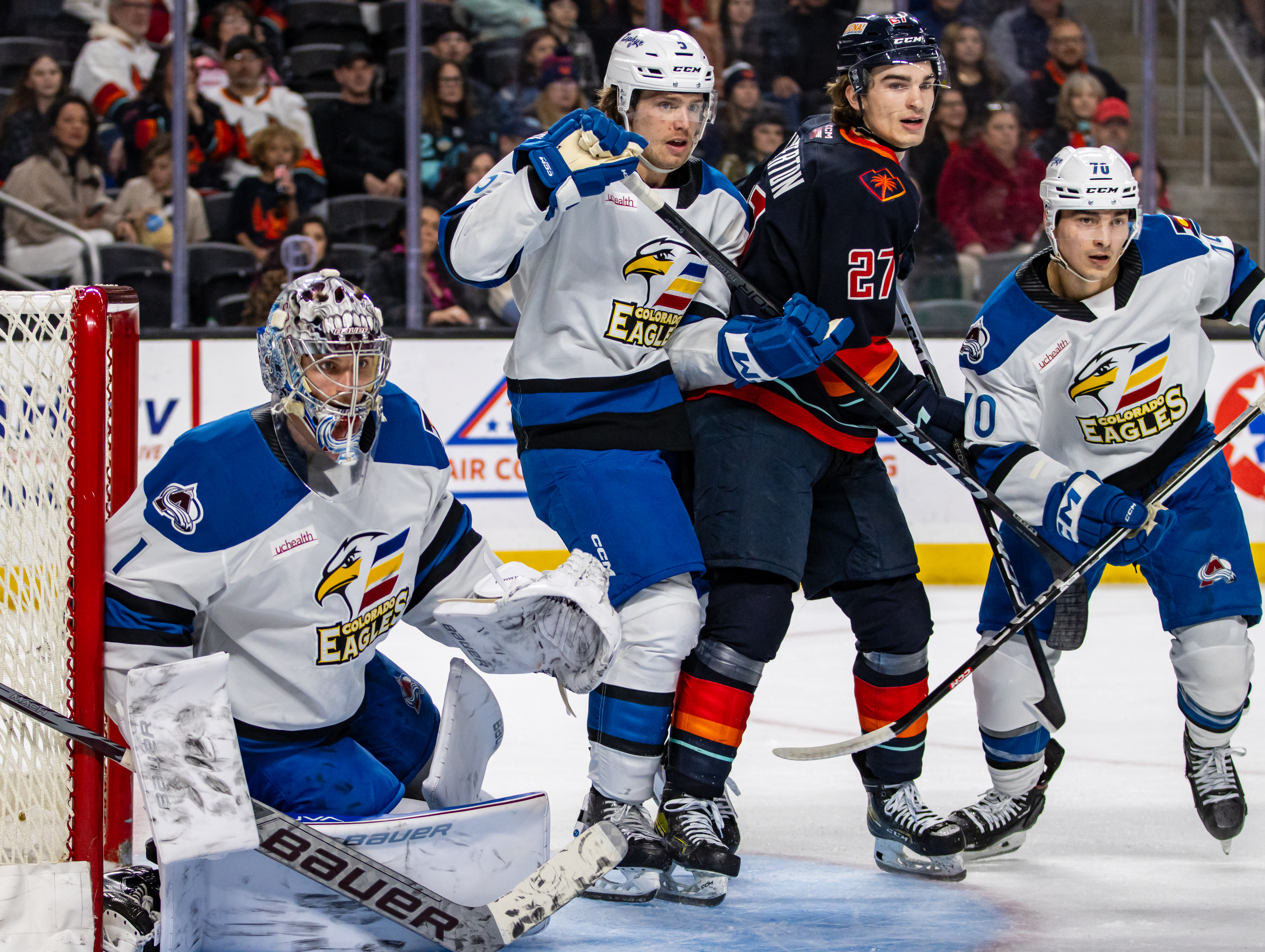
- Malinski playing for the Colorado Eagles in 2024
- Born: July 27, 1998 (age 28) Lakeville, Minnesota, U.S.
- Height: 5 ft 11 in (180 cm)
- Weight: 190 lb (86 kg; 13 st 8 lb)
- Position: Defense
- Shoots: Right
- NHL team: Colorado Avalanche
- NHL draft: Undrafted
- Playing career: 2023–present

Sam Malinski (born July 27, 1998) is an American professional ice hockey player who is a defenseman for the Colorado Avalanche of the National Hockey League (NHL). He was an All-American for Cornell University, where he served as team captain as a senior.

== Playing career ==
=== Amateur ===
Malinski played high school hockey for Lakeville South High, graduating in 2017. He served as team captain during his senior season and helped the team make an appearance in the state tournament. Malinski continued his junior career first with the Cedar Rapids RoughRiders but finished out the year with the Bismarck Bobcats. His offensive production saw a tremendous improvement the following year and, in December, he committed to play college hockey at Cornell.

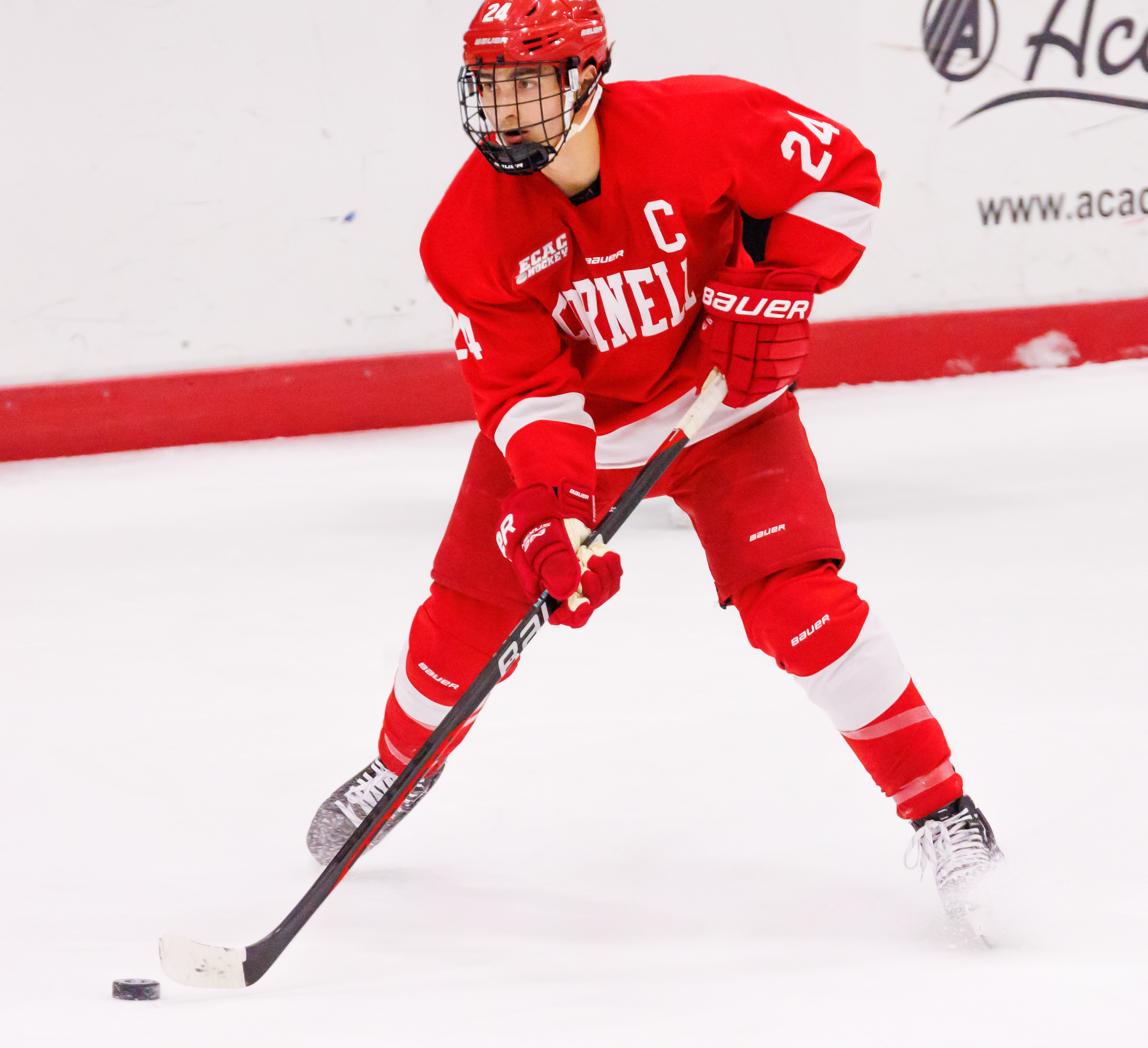
Malinski with Cornell in 2023.

Malinski's arrival in Ithaca, New York, coincided with the team posting one of its best seasons in decades. The Big Red were one of the top teams that year and were expected to compete for the national championship. Malinski produced 16 points in 25 games, playing as a regular. Cornell finished the season ranked first in both polls and was looking to have a good postseason. However, before a single playoff game could be played by the Big Red, the COVID-19 pandemic forced the remainder of the season to be canceled. The pandemic also caused Cornell to cancel its entire 2020–21 campaign. Because Malinski had already exhausted his junior eligibility, he was unable to play organized hockey during his sophomore year while also maintaining his collegiate eligibility.

By the time Malinski could finally play another organized game in the fall of 2021, then he was one of the team's leaders and took over as the key offensive contributor from the blueline. Despite the layoff, both Malinski and Cornell looked good at the start of the season. While leading the defensmen in points, Malinski also helped the team act as its typical defensive juggernaut and had the Big Red ranked in the top 10 at the end of January. However, around that time, head coach Mike Schafer had to have surgery to implant a coronary stent. While he would eventually recover, the team stumbled down the stretch in his absence and fell outside of the playoff picture.

For his senior season, Malinski was named team co-captain and was finally able to lead the team to an NCAA tournament berth. Cornell was one of the top defensive teams in the country, thanks in no small part to Malinski. He was named to the second All-American team while finishing third on the Big Red in points. More importantly, Malinski helped defeat Denver in the regional semifinal, allowing Cornell to upset the fourth overall seed with a 2–0 shutout. Cornell's season, and Malinski's amateur career, ended with a 2–1 loss to Boston University in the regional final.

=== Professional ===
==== Colorado Avalanche ====
Malinski's outstanding career at Cornell convinced the Colorado Avalanche to sign him to a two-year, entry-level contract on March 30, 2023. He made his professional debut shortly thereafter for the Avalanche's American Hockey League (AHL) affiliate, the Colorado Eagles, joining the club for the remainder of the season on a professional try-out basis.

After attending his first NHL training camp, Malinski was re-assigned to the Eagles to begin the 2023–24 season. While quickly establishing himself at the AHL level, Malinski received his first recall to the Avalanche and made his NHL debut on November 13, 2023, in a 5–1 road win against the Seattle Kraken. He recorded his first NHL point, a secondary assist on a Nathan MacKinnon goal, in a 4–2 home loss to the Winnipeg Jets on December 7. Six nights later, on December 13, Malinski scored his first NHL goal, in the third period of a 5–1 home win over the Buffalo Sabres. Malinski would go on to split the season between the Avalanche and Eagles, notching three goals and 10 points through 23 games at the NHL level.

In the 2024–25 season, Malinski made the Colorado’s opening night roster and suited up in 76 regular season games for Colorado. In a third-pairing role, Malinski contributed with five goals and 10 assists for 15 points, ranking third among Avalanche defensemen in goals and tied for fourth in points. He made his playoff debut in the Western Conference first round, appearing in five games registering one assist against the Dallas Stars.

As a pending restricted free agent, Malinski was signed to a one-year, $1.4 million contract extension with the Avalanche on June 30, 2025. After strong play through the first half of 2025–26 season, including setting career-highs in assists (21) and points (24), Malinski signed a 4-year contract extension worth $19 million on January 27, 2026.

During the 2026 Stanley Cup playoffs, Malinski scored his first career playoff goal during Game 1 of the Avalanche's second round series against the Minnesota Wild.

== Career statistics ==
| | | | Regular season | | | | | Playoffs |
| Season | Team | League | GP | G | A | Pts | PIM | GP | G | A | Pts | PIM |
|---|---|---|---|---|---|---|---|---|---|---|---|---|
| 2014–15 | Lakeville South High | USHS-MN | 24 | 0 | 0 | 0 | 14 | 2 | 0 | 2 | 2 | 0 |
| 2015–16 | Lakeville South High | USHS-MN | 25 | 4 | 18 | 22 | 8 | 2 | 0 | 0 | 0 | 2 |
| 2016–17 | Lakeville South High | USHS-MN | 24 | 5 | 22 | 27 | 16 | 3 | 1 | 2 | 3 | 0 |
| 2017–18 | Cedar Rapids RoughRiders | USHL | 19 | 2 | 1 | 3 | 4 | — | — | — | — | — |
| 2017–18 | Bismarck Bobcats | NAHL | 28 | 1 | 9 | 10 | 8 | — | — | — | — | — |
| 2018–19 | Bismarck Bobcats | NAHL | 59 | 14 | 31 | 45 | 24 | 3 | 0 | 0 | 0 | 2 |
| 2019–20 | Cornell University | ECAC | 25 | 4 | 12 | 16 | 12 | — | — | — | — | — |
| 2021–22 | Cornell University | ECAC | 32 | 5 | 18 | 23 | 26 | — | — | — | — | — |
| 2022–23 | Cornell University | ECAC | 34 | 8 | 18 | 26 | 29 | — | — | — | — | — |
| 2022–23 | Colorado Eagles | AHL | 7 | 3 | 2 | 5 | 0 | 7 | 0 | 5 | 5 | 2 |
| 2023–24 | Colorado Eagles | AHL | 46 | 5 | 22 | 27 | 20 | 3 | 0 | 2 | 2 | 0 |
| 2023–24 | Colorado Avalanche | NHL | 23 | 3 | 7 | 10 | 6 | — | — | — | — | — |
| 2024–25 | Colorado Avalanche | NHL | 76 | 5 | 10 | 15 | 16 | 5 | 0 | 1 | 1 | 4 |
| 2025–26 | Colorado Avalanche | NHL | 82 | 8 | 32 | 40 | 22 | 11 | 1 | 2 | 3 | 0 |
| NHL totals | | | 181 | 16 | 49 | 65 | 44 | 16 | 1 | 3 | 4 | 4 |

== Awards and honors ==
| Award | Year | Ref |
College
| All-ECAC Hockey First Team | 2022–23 | |
| AHCA East Second Team All-American | 2022–23 | |
