= Lakeville South High School =

Location
- 21135 Jacquard Avenue; Lakeville, Minnesota 55044; United States
- 44.64233°N 93.26959°W

Information
- Type: Public high school
- Established: 2005; 21 years ago
- School district: Independent School District 194
- NCES School ID: 271778003515
- Principal: Shaun Murphy
- Teaching staff: 82.56 (on an FTE basis)
- Grades: 9–12
- Enrollment: 1,816 (2024-2025)
- Student to teacher ratio: 22.00
- Colors: Cardinal red, Vegas gold, white
- Mascot: Cougar
- Rival: Lakeville North High School
- Newspaper: The Current
- Yearbook: The Catamount
- Website: Official website

Lakeville South High School (LSHS) is a high school located Lakeville, Minnesota, United States. To meet the needs of a growing population, in the early 2000s the district began construction of LSHS. It enrolled students for the first time in fall 2005. Unlike LNHS, whose student come from a predominantly urban/suburban catchment area, LSHS pulls from the suburban/rural areas of Lakeville. This socioeconomic divide has contributed to the ferocity of the rivalry between LNHS and LSHS athletics.

The school is a member of Minnesota Independent School District 194 (Lakeville Area Public Schools) and is affiliated with the Minnesota State High School League (MSHSL). The school is a member of the South Suburban Conference.

== Curriculum ==
Through the Minnesota state Post Secondary Enrollment Options (PSEO) program, students are eligible to take classes at state colleges and universities.

== Athletics ==
The school competes under the Minnesota State High School League and is a member of the competitive South Suburban Conference. The school was in the Lake Conference until 2009–2010.

Lakeville South Minnesota State High School championships
Year	Sport
2007	Girls' soccer - Class AA
2008	Girls' alpine skiing
2009	Girls' alpine skiing
2010	Girls' alpine skiing
2019	Girls' alpine skiing
2012	Girls' track & field - Class AA
2014	Girls' softball - Class AAA
2015	Girls' track & field - Class AA
2020	Boys' football - 6A Associated Press "Mythical" State Champions
2021	Boys' football - Class AAAAAA
2021	Marching band - A
2022	Marching band - AA
2023	Marching band - AA

== Notable alumni ==
- Justin Kloos, professional ice hockey player
- Mitch Leidner, former quarterback for the Minnesota Golden Gophers
- Riley Mahlman, college football offensive tackle for the Wisconsin Badgers
- Sam Malinski, professional ice hockey player
