= Robert C. Jensen =

American politician (1928–2011)

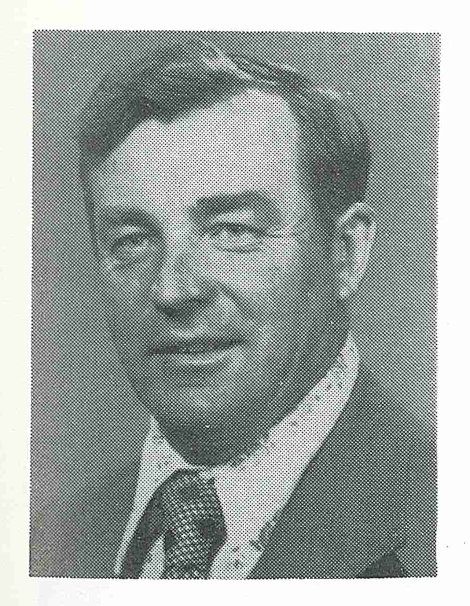
- Jensen c. 1977

Member of the Minnesota House of Representatives from the 36B District
- In office January 5, 1987 – January 1, 1989
- Governor: Rudy Perpich

Member of the Minnesota House of Representatives from the 36B District
- In office January 1, 1983 – January 6, 1985
- Governor: Rudy Perpich

Member of the Minnesota House of Representatives from the 53B District
- In office January 6, 1975 – December 31, 1978
- Governor: Wendell R. Anderson; Rudy Perpich

Personal details
- Born: October 29, 1928 Minneapolis, Minnesota, U.S.
- Died: November 27, 2011 (aged 83) Rosemont, Minnesota, U.S.
- Resting place: Saint Michael's Catholic Cemetery; Farmington, Minnesota, U.S.
- Other political affiliations: Minnesota Democratic–Farmer–Labor Party
- Spouse: Bernice Pahl (m. 1948)
- Children: 11
- Education: Inver Hills Community College

Robert "Bob" C. Jensen (October 29, 1928 – November 27, 2011) was an American farmer and politician.

Jensen was born in Minneapolis, Minnesota and was a grain and dairy farmer. He went to Lakeview High School and Inver Hills Community College. Jensen moved to New Market, Minnesota in 1949. He then moved in Lakeville, Minnesota in 1957 and to Rosemount, Minnesota in 2001. He lived in Lakeview, Minnesota, with his wife and family, but his postal address was Farmington, Minnesota. He served as mayor of Lakeview, Minnesota, and on the Lakeview village board. Jensen also served on the Ramsey County Commission and was a Democrat. He also served on the Minnesota Mississippi River Parkway Commission and the Dakota County Planning Commission. Jensen served in the Minnesota House of Representatives from 1975 to 1978 and from 1983 to 1984, and from 1987 to 1988. Jensen died from colon cancer at The Lodge hospice in Rosemont, Minnesota.
