= Inver Hills Community College =

College in Inver Grove Heights, Minnesota, US

Coordinates: 44.82873°N 93.05489°W

- Motto: Where all students belong.
- Type: Public community college
- Established: 1970
- Parent institution: Minnesota State Colleges and Universities System
- Chancellor: Devinder Malhotra
- President: Michael Berndt
- Provost: Elaina Bleifield
- Students: 6,400
- Location: 2500 80th Street East, Inver Grove Heights, Minnesota, United States
- Campus: Suburban, 90 acres (36 ha)
- Website: www.inverhills.edu

Inver Hills Community College is a public community college in Inver Grove Heights, Minnesota. Founded in 1970, the college is part of the Minnesota State Colleges and Universities System. The 90-acre (36 ha) campus consists of nine buildings. Inver Hills has more than 4,000 students per semester and the college offers 27 degree associate programs in liberal education as well as career-related degrees.

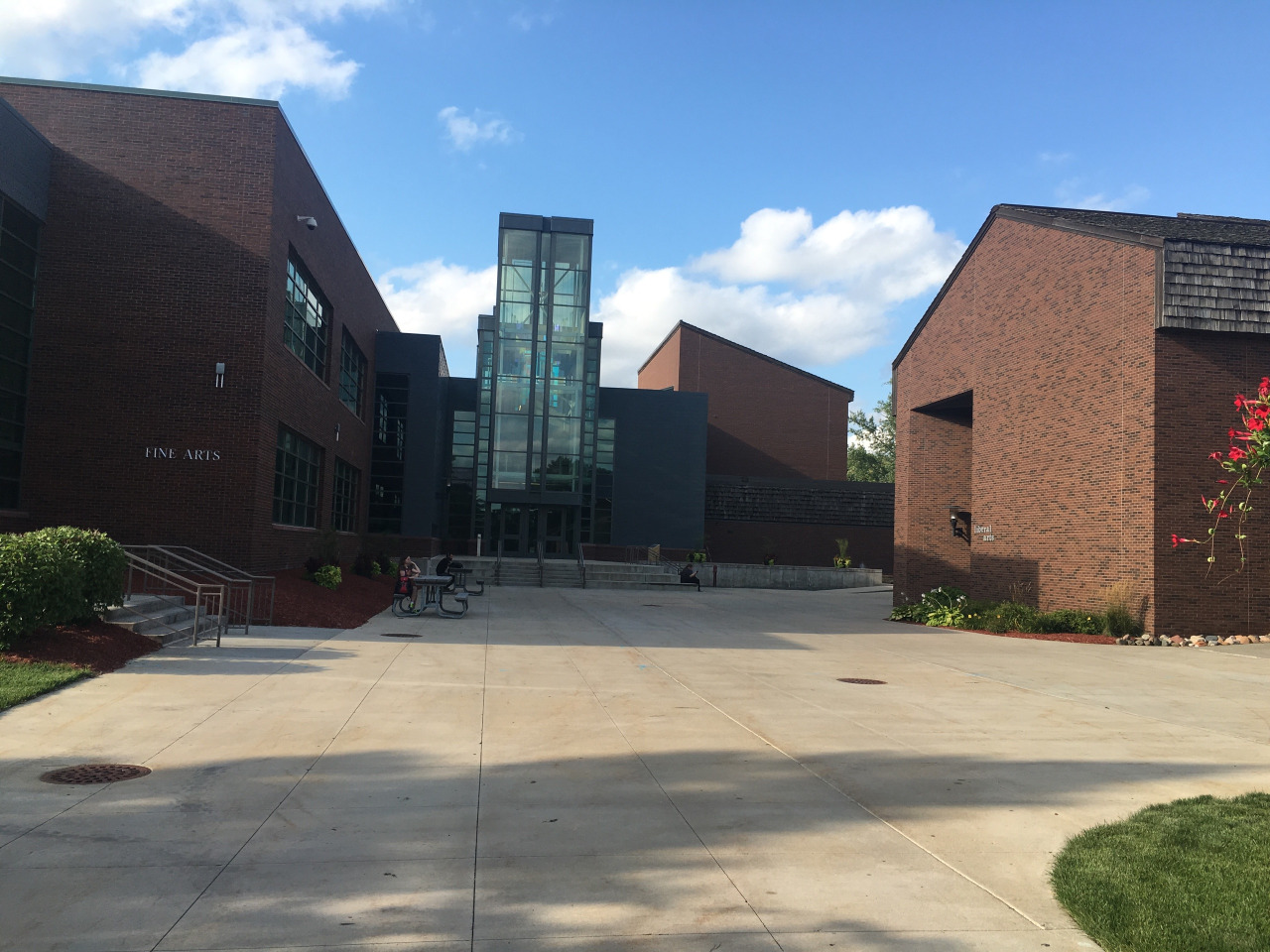
View of the Fine Arts building, with the Alexandra Klas Tower, and the Liberal Arts building on the right

== Notable alumni ==
- Betty McCollum - U.S. representative
- Robert C. Jensen - farmer and Minnesota state legislator
