= Lakeville, Minnesota =

- City
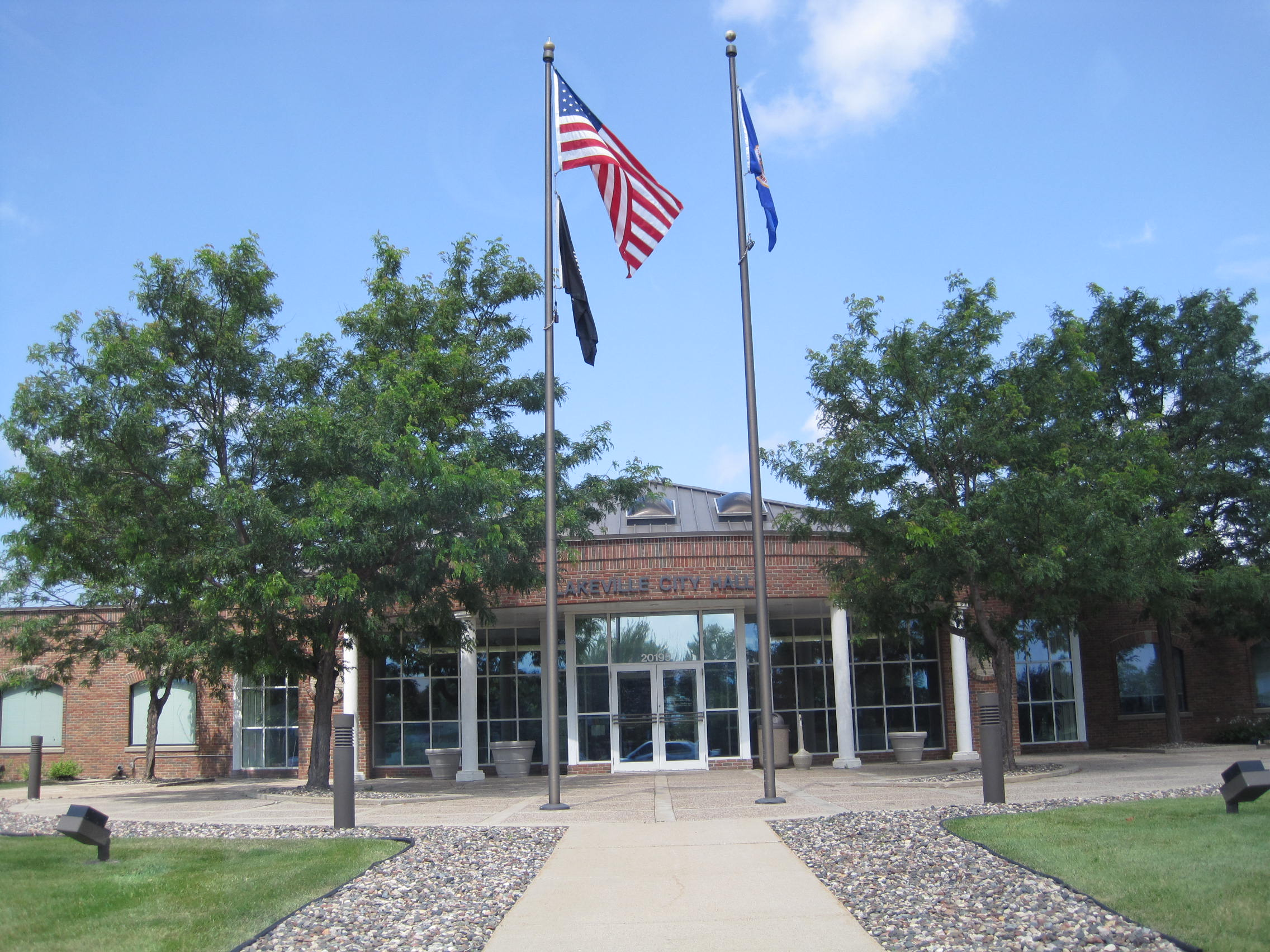
- Lakeville City Hall

- Interactive map of Lakeville, Minnesota
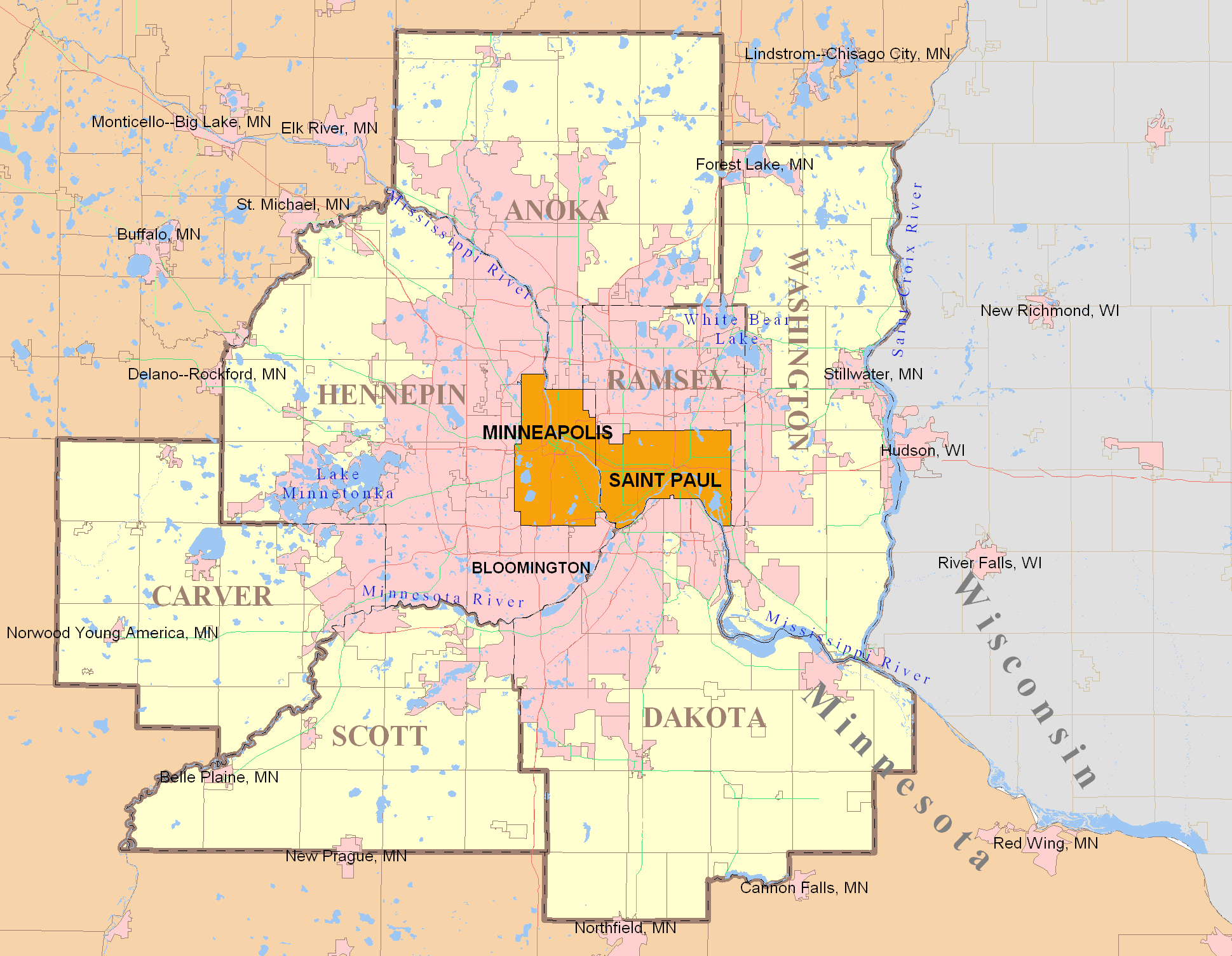
- Location within the Minneapolis–Saint Paul metropolitan area Location within Minnesota Location with the United States
- Coordinates: 44°38′59″N 93°14′33″W
- Country: United States
- State: Minnesota
- County: Dakota
- Founded: 1855
- Established: 1858
- Incorporated: 1967
- Founder: J. J. Brackett
- Named for: Prairie Lake (now Lake Marion)

Government
  - Type: Mayor–council
  - Mayor: Luke Hellier

Area
  - City: 38.35 sq mi (99.33 km^{2})
  - Land: 36.59 sq mi (94.78 km^{2})
  - Water: 1.76 sq mi (4.55 km^{2})
- Elevation: 1,086 ft (331 m)

Population (2020)
  - City: 69,490
  - Estimate (2025): 79,270
  - Rank: US: 498th MN: 9th
  - Density: 1,899.0/sq mi (733.19/km^{2})
  - Metro: 3,693,729 (US: 16th)
- Time zone: UTC-6 (Central (CST))
  - Summer (DST): UTC-5 (CDT)
- ZIP code: 55044
- Area code: 952
- FIPS code: 27-35180
- GNIS feature ID: 2395614
- Website: lakevillemn.gov

Lakeville (/ˈleɪkvɪl/) is the largest city in Dakota County, Minnesota, United States. An exurb in the Minneapolis–Saint Paul metropolitan area, it is about 20 miles (32 km) south of both downtown Minneapolis and downtown St. Paul along Interstate 35. The population was 69,490 at the 2020 census, making it the ninth-most populous city in Minnesota.

Lakeville was founded in 1855. It was once a flourishing milling center; its agriculture industry and other major industries are still in operation. The city first became notable in 1910 when Marion Savage built the Dan Patch Railroad Line to serve his Antlers Amusement Park. Lakeville is one of the fastest-growing cities in the Twin Cities area. While many of its workers commute within the metropolitan area, Lakeville has had its own industrial presence since the 1960s. This includes Airlake Industrial Park, which is served by Airlake Airport, a regional reliever airport.

== History ==
A military road was constructed between Fort Snelling and forts to the south. In 1855, J. J. Brackett, a Saint Paul lumber baron and mail carrier using the road, platted a site halfway between Saint Paul and Saint Peter on a lake he named Prairie Lake. The village was established as Lakeville Township in 1858. Notoriety came when Colonel Marion Savage expanded his entertainment business by constructing Antlers Amusement Park in 1910. Riding on fame from his success with the Dan Patch racing horse and the park's popularity, the lake was renamed Lake Marion, and the rail line serving the park was named the Dan Patch Railroad Line.

With the mostly rural landscape, early settlers were farmers. A high proportion were Scandinavian. Other ethnic groups included Irish, Scots, and English, each of whom had spread out from Hamilton Landing and Burnsville. In Karen Miller's diary from 1840 to 1895, Danes reportedly outnumbered Norwegians; travel to Minneapolis was not uncommon for the rural township. Enggren's Grocery was a downtown staple from 1900 until it closed in 2006.

Lakeville's development later in the 20th century followed a typical pattern for outer-ring Twin Cities suburbs. The town was officially incorporated as the City of Lakeville in 1967. It remained primarily agricultural, as postwar development did not immediately absorb Lakeville (and Interstate 35 had not yet been completed). In the early 21st century, housing and population increases were due to rising land costs in the metropolitan area, causing Lakeville to become a boomtown.

== Geography ==
According to the United States Census Bureau, the city has an area of 37.83 square miles (97.98 km^{2}), of which 36.06 square miles (93.39 km^{2}) is land and 1.77 square miles (4.58 km^{2}) is water. Lakeville includes the Argonne Farms post-World War I settlement project, which failed in the early 20th century and was redeveloped in the 21st century into typical suburban retail. Since it was a semi-autonomous village within Lakeville Township before the city's incorporation, it continues to appear today on maps as Argonne.

A branch of the Vermillion River flows through Lakeville. Its headwaters are just west of the city limits in Credit River Township, and it flows eastward across Dakota County until it empties into the Mississippi River at the Wisconsin border. Much of Lakeville drains into the Vermillion River watershed. North Creek, a major tributary of the Vermillion, begins its flow in northern Lakeville and flows eastward to meet the Vermillion near downtown Farmington just east of Lakeville. The Minnesota Department of Natural Resources has designated the Vermillion River as a trout stream.

=== Climate ===
Lakeville's climate is classified as warm-summer humid continental with features of a hot-summer humid continental (Köppen Dfa).

Climate data for Lakeville weather station - 2010–2020
Month	Jan	Feb	Mar	Apr	May	Jun	Jul	Aug	Sep	Oct	Nov	Dec	Year
Mean daily maximum °F (°C)	22.6 (−5.2)	26.4 (−3.1)	42.4 (5.8)	55.0 (12.8)	68.7 (20.4)	78.3 (25.7)	82.8 (28.2)	80.4 (26.9)	72.1 (22.3)	57.2 (14.0)	41.9 (5.5)	27.1 (−2.7)	54.5 (12.5)
Daily mean °F (°C)	16.5 (−8.6)	19.4 (−7.0)	34.9 (1.6)	46.2 (7.9)	59.2 (15.1)	68.9 (20.5)	73.2 (22.9)	70.9 (21.6)	63.5 (17.5)	49.6 (9.8)	36.1 (2.3)	22.5 (−5.3)	46.7 (8.2)
Mean daily minimum °F (°C)	10.4 (−12.0)	12.2 (−11.0)	26.8 (−2.9)	37.4 (3.0)	49.5 (9.7)	59.9 (15.5)	63.9 (17.7)	61.3 (16.3)	55.2 (12.9)	41.9 (5.5)	29.5 (−1.4)	18.1 (−7.7)	38.8 (3.8)
Source: weather-online

== Demographics ==
Historical population
Census	Pop.	Note	%±
1880	168		—
1890	258		53.6%
1900	373		44.6%
1910	385		3.2%
1920	474		23.1%
1930	522		10.1%
1940	543		4.0%
1950	628		15.7%
1960	924		47.1%
1970	7,556		717.7%
1980	14,790		95.7%
1990	24,854		68.0%
2000	43,128		73.5%
2010	55,954		29.7%
2020	69,490		24.2%
2025 (est.)	79,270		14.1%
U.S. Decennial Census; 2020 Census

Historical population
Census	Pop.	Note	%±
1860	598		—
1870	780		30.4%
1880	802		2.8%
1890	701		−12.6%
1900	805		14.8%
1910	841		4.5%
1920	744		−11.5%
1930	999		34.3%
1940	1,268		26.9%
1950	1,356		6.9%
1960	2,123		56.6%
U.S. Census for Lakeville Township

=== 2020 census ===
As of the 2020 census, Lakeville had a population of 69,490. The median age was 36.7 years. 29.0% of residents were under the age of 18 and 10.2% of residents were 65 years of age or older. For every 100 females there were 99.4 males, and for every 100 females age 18 and over there were 95.9 males age 18 and over.

99.2% of residents lived in urban areas, while 0.8% lived in rural areas.

There were 23,265 households in Lakeville, of which 44.1% had children under the age of 18 living in them. Of all households, 67.1% were married-couple households, 10.7% were households with a male householder and no spouse or partner present, and 16.6% were households with a female householder and no spouse or partner present. About 14.7% of all households were made up of individuals and 6.2% had someone living alone who was 65 years of age or older.

There were 23,971 housing units, of which 2.9% were vacant. The homeowner vacancy rate was 0.8% and the rental vacancy rate was 4.4%.

Racial composition as of the 2020 census
Race	Number	Percent
White	55,546	79.9%
Black or African American	3,019	4.3%
American Indian and Alaska Native	278	0.4%
Asian	4,064	5.8%
Native Hawaiian and Other Pacific Islander	13	0.0%
Some other race	2,004	2.9%
Two or more races	4,566	6.6%
Hispanic or Latino (of any race)	3,966	5.7%

=== 2010 census ===
As of the census of 2010, there were 55,954 people, 18,683 households, and 15,158 families residing in the city. The population density was 1,551.7 inhabitants per square mile (599.1/km^{2}). There were 19,456 housing units at an average density of 539.5 per square mile (208.3/km^{2}). The racial makeup of the city was 89.3% White, 2.5% African American, 0.4% Native American, 4.1% Asian, 1.2% from other races, and 2.5% from two or more races. Hispanic or Latino of any race were 3.5% of the population.

There were 18,683 households, of which 49.1% had children under the age of 18 living with them, 67.9% were married couples living together, 9.2% had a female householder with no husband present, 4.0% had a male householder with no wife present, and 18.9% were non-families. 14.0% of all households were made up of individuals, and 3.6% had someone living alone who was 65 years of age or older. The average household size was 2.99 and the average family size was 3.32.

The median age in the city was 34.8 years. 31.8% of residents were under the age of 18; 6.7% were between the ages of 18 and 24; 28.8% were from 25 to 44; 27% were from 45 to 64; and 5.8% were 65 years of age or older. The gender makeup of the city was 50.1% male and 49.9% female.

=== Income ===
The median income for a household in the city was $119,970, and the median income for a family was $129,069 as of 2023. Males had a median income of $65,474 versus $40,263 for females. The per capita income for the city was $52,634. About 3.8% of the population were below the poverty line, including 2.0% of those under age 18 and 4.3% of those age 65 or over.

== Economy ==
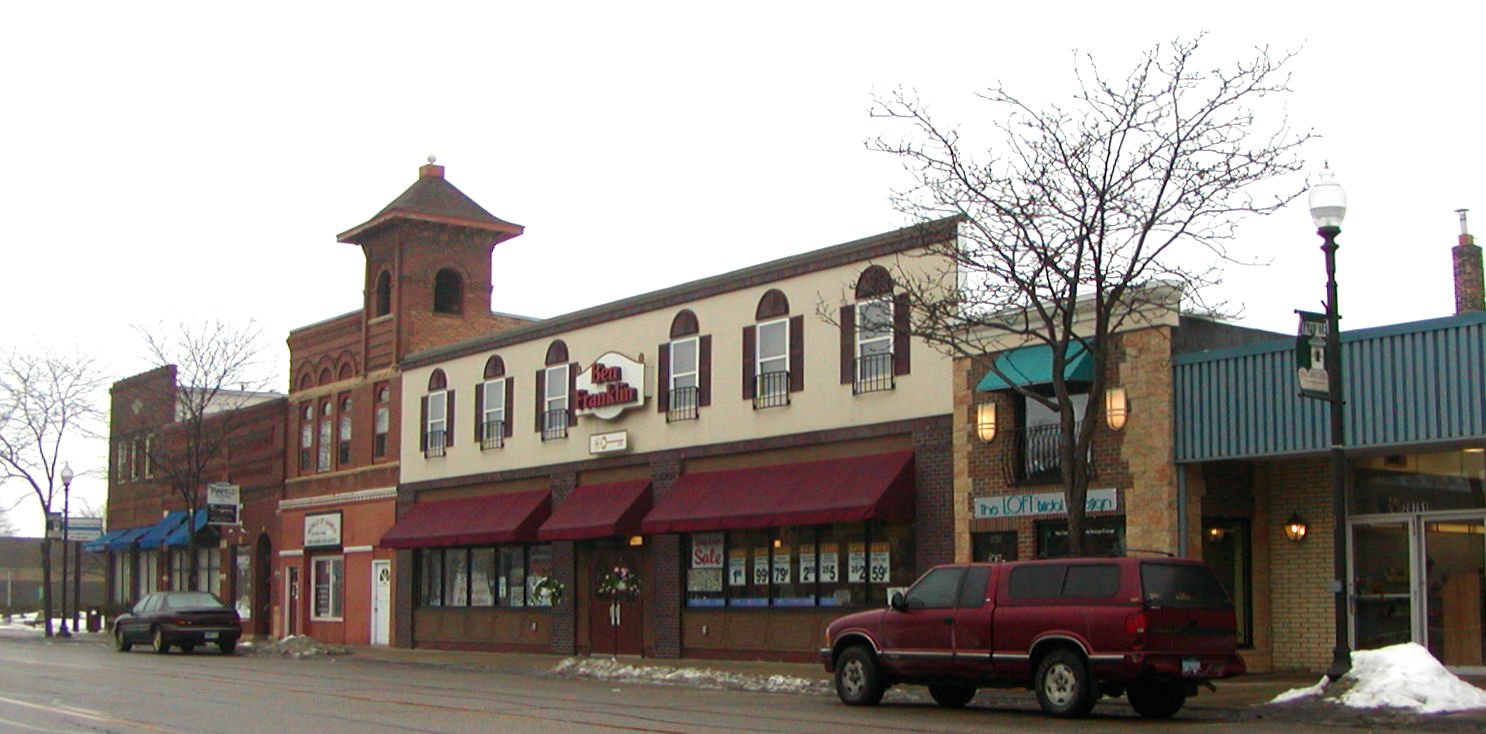
Shops on Main Street

Airlake Industrial Park, developed by Maynard Johnson with colleagues at Bloomington-based Hitchcock Industries, is home to as many as 200 companies and an estimated 4,500 employees. The 1,500-acre park, one of the state's largest contiguous industrial parks, has attracted companies ranging from start-ups to large corporations.

Airlake Industrial Park was a contrived name: "air" represented the airport that Hitchcock Industries built on the grounds and "lake" signified Lake Marion.

Lakeville is served by the Airlake Airport, which has a single runway with an ILS approach. The Metropolitan Airports Commission manages the airport as a reliever facility to draw general aviation traffic. The FAA operates the Minneapolis ARTCC (air route traffic control center) in Farmington, several miles from the airport. This center provides traffic control services for Minnesota and surrounding states.

Large farms are still in operation, deriving most of their revenue from corn, soybeans, and dairy cattle.

Post Consumer Brands has had its headquarters in Lakeville since 2015.

== Parks and recreation ==
Lakeville has many recreational opportunities. As of 2020, it has 3,021 acres of parks, recreation and preserves. The Parks & Recreation Department maintains 62 public properties, including neighborhood and community parks, athletic fields, playgrounds, greenways, trails, tennis courts, skating rinks, picnic areas, conservation areas, nature areas, several public fishing areas, swimming beaches, the City's Central Maintenance Facility, Senior Center, and the Lakeville Area Arts Center. Notable parks include Ritter Farm Park, North Park, Antlers Park, King Park, Valley Lake Park, and Aronson Park, which features a Veterans Memorial.

Antlers Park features a large swimming beach with volleyball courts, baseball diamonds, a playground area, water equipment, a picnic area, a fishing pier, and horseshoe pits. Orchard Lake Beach has a picnic area, shore fishing, playground equipment, and volleyball courts. Valley Lake Beach includes playground equipment, a picnic area, a walking trail around the lake, a fishing pier and seasonal restrooms.

== Government ==
The city of Lakeville is governed by a five-member city council, including a mayor. A city administrator runs day-to-day municipal operations. A professional police force and volunteer fire department protect the city's residents. The city operates a large parks department that includes a senior center, an entertainment center, dozens of various neighborhood and community parks, and many miles of multipurpose trails.

Luke Hellier is the mayor. The city is in Minnesota's 2nd congressional district, represented since 2019 by Angie Craig. Lakeville is represented in the Minnesota Senate by District 57 Senator Zach Duckworth. In the Minnesota House, Lakeville is represented by District 57A Representative Jon Koznick and District 57B Representative Jeff Witte.

Presidential election results

2024 Precinct Results Spreadsheet2020 Precinct Results Spreadsheet2016 Precinct Results Spreadsheet2012 Precinct Results Spreadsheet2008 Precinct Results Spreadsheet2004 Precinct Results Spreadsheet2000 Precinct Results Spreadsheet1996 Precinct Results1992 Precinct Results1988 Precinct Results1984 Precinct Results1980 Precinct Results1976 Precinct Results1968 Precinct Results1964 Precinct Results1960 Precinct Results
Year	Republican	Democratic	Third parties
2024	49.0% 21,763	48.6% 21,618	2.4% 1,076
2020	49.4% 20,653	48.4% 20,252	3.2% 933
2016	51.5% 17,573	39.8% 13,567	8.7% 2,967
2012	56.5% 16,945	41.6% 12,487	1.9% 587
2008	54.3% 16,445	44.2% 13,370	1.5% 467
2004	59.7% 16,132	49.5% 10,667	0.8% 230
2000	55.0% 11,823	39.8% 8,564	5.2% 1,108
1996	41.6% 6,699	45.5% 7,337	12.9% 2,080
1992	35.6% 5,195	35.3% 5,155	29.1% 4,263
1988	54.1% 5,067	45.9% 4,301	0.0% 0
1984	59.4% 3,043	40.6% 2,076	0.0% 0
1980	44.8% 2,543	43.8% 2,487	11.4% 648
1976	42.0% 2,002	55.5% 2,645	2.5% 115
1968	36.9% 807	57.3% 1,255	5.8% 128
1964	35.0% 149	65.0% 277	0.0% 0
1960	51.3% 216	48.7% 205	0.0% 0

== Education ==
Lakeville is served by three different school districts, whose boundaries were determined when the community was largely agricultural. Today Independent School District 196 ("Rosemount-Apple Valley-Eagan") and Farmington School District 192 serve parts of northern and eastern Lakeville. Most Lakeville households are served by Lakeville Area School District 194. In 2005, the Lakeville School District opened its second high school, Lakeville South. Some students attend public schools in other school districts chosen by their families under Minnesota's open enrollment statute. Lakeville North was a Blue Ribbon school of excellence in 2009. Each high school has nearly 2,000 students. There are nine public elementary schools and three public middle schools. Century Middle School students go on to attend Lakeville North, McGuire Middle School students go on to attend Lakeville South, and Kenwood Middle School students attend either, depending on their neighborhood of residence.

== Media ==
- Lakeville Sun Thisweek
- Farm Show newspaper has been published in Lakeville since 1976

== Transportation ==
Lakeville is directly served by Interstate 35, as well as Cedar Avenue/MN 77 to the east.

Before its abandonment in 1970, the Milwaukee Road's Hastings and Dakota Subdivision ran through the center of Lakeville and served various industries. Short-line railroad Progressive Rail is based in Lakeville, and owns the right-of-way of the MN&S Subdivision between Lakeville and Northfield. Between Lakeville and Savage the MN&S Subdivision is owned by Canadian Pacific Railway, but it has been out of service since the 1990s. In 2009 Progressive Rail began using a segment of the out-of-service tracks for railcar storage, causing local controversy. The Dan Patch Corridor would go through Lakeville. The Minnesota Legislature banned it from discussion and funding in 2002, but lifted the gag order in 2023. The City of Lakeville still opposes public funding of a passenger rail line through the community on the MN and S Subdivision.

== Notable people ==
- Elisabeth Bachman, Olympic volleyball player
- Rachel Banham, WNBA player
- Jeff Braun, music engineer, CMA Nominee
- Bradley Ellingboe, composer
- Maggie Flaherty, professional ice hockey player
- Robert C. Jensen, Minnesota state legislator and farmer
- Kevin Kaesviharn, pro football player
- John Kline, U.S. Representative
- Paul Krause, Pro Football Hall of Famer
- Chelsea Laden, ice hockey goaltender and reality-TV star
- Charlie Lindgren, professional ice hockey goaltender
- Matt Little, Minnesota state senator and attorney
- Bill Macklin, Minnesota state legislator, judge, and lawyer
- J.P. Macura, NBA player
- Sam Malinski, professional ice hockey player
- Joey Miller, NASCAR driver
- Paula Moltzan, alpine skier
- Jake Oettinger, professional ice hockey goaltender
- Janelle Pierzina, Big Brother contestant
- Ryan Poehling, professional ice hockey player
- Joseph Andrew Quinn, Minnesota state legislator and lawyer
- Jordan Schroeder, professional ice hockey player
- Brady Skjei, professional ice hockey player
- Regan Smith, Olympic swimming gold medalist
