= 75th Minnesota Legislature =

1987 and 1988 legislative sessions

Seventy-fifth Minnesota Legislature
←	74th Minnesota Legislature	76th Minnesota Legislature	→
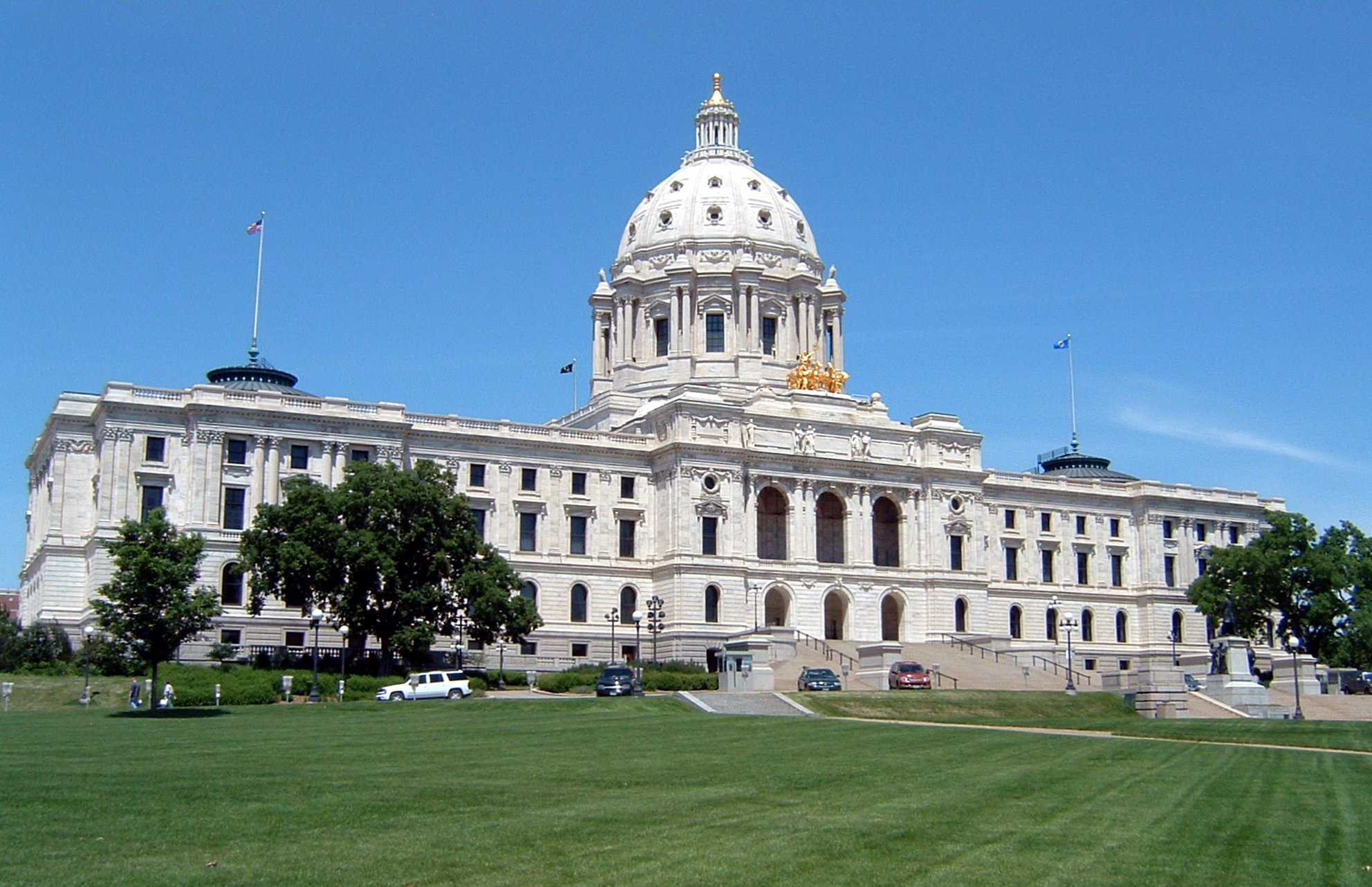

Overview
- Legislative body: Minnesota Legislature
- Jurisdiction: Minnesota, United States
- Meeting place: Minnesota State Capitol
- Term: January 6, 1987 – January 3, 1989
- Website: www.leg.state.mn.us

Minnesota State Senate
- Members: 67 Senators
- President: Jerome M. Hughes
- President pro tempore: Florian Chmielewski
- Majority Leader: Roger Moe
- Minority Leader: Duane Benson
- Party control: Democratic-Farmer-Labor Party

Minnesota House of Representatives
- Members: 134 Representatives
- Speaker: Fred C. Norton, Robert Vanasek
- Majority Leader: Robert Vanasek, Ann Wynia
- Minority Leader: William R. Schreiber
- Party control: Democratic-Farmer-Labor Party

The seventy-fifth Minnesota Legislature first convened on January 6, 1987. The 67 members of the Minnesota Senate and the 134 members of the Minnesota House of Representatives were elected during the General Election of November 4, 1986.

== Sessions ==
The legislature met in a regular session from January 6, 1987, to May 18, 1987. A special session was convened on June 25, 1987, to enact legislation strengthening the state's laws regarding corporate takeovers.

A continuation of the regular session was held between February 9, 1988, and April 25, 1988.

== Party summary ==
Resignations and new members are discussed in the "Membership changes" section, below.

=== Senate ===
	Party (Shading indicates majority caucus)		Total	Vacant
	DFL	IR	Total	Vacant
End of previous Legislature	43	24	67	0
Begin	47	20	67	0
November 15, 1987	46	20	66	1
November 16, 1987	46	21	67	0
January 1, 1989	45	21	66	1
Latest voting share	67%	31%		
Beginning of the next Legislature	44	23	67	0

=== House of Representatives ===
	Party (Shading indicates majority caucus)		Total	Vacant
	DFL	IR	Total	Vacant
End of previous Legislature	65	67	132	2
Begin	83	51	134	0
June 25, 1987	82	51	133	1
September 2, 1987	81	51	132	2
November 12, 1987	82	52	134	0
July 19, 1988	82	51	133	1
September 7, 1988	81	51	132	2
Latest voting share	60%	38%		
Beginning of the next Legislature	81	53	134	0

== Leadership ==
=== Senate ===
President of the Senate
Jerome M. Hughes (DFL-Maplewood)

President pro tempore (Note: Florian Chmielewski served as president pro tempore during the 1987 special session, because Senate President Jerome M. Hughes was absent.)
Florian Chmielewski (DFL-Sturgeon Lake)

Senate Majority Leader
Roger Moe (DFL-Erskine)

Senate Minority Leader
Duane Benson (IR-Lanesboro)

=== House of Representatives ===
Speaker of the House
Until June 25, 1987 Fred C. Norton (DFL-St. Paul)
After June 25, 1987 Robert Vanasek (DFL-New Prague)

House Majority Leader
Until June 25, 1987 Robert Vanasek (DFL-New Prague)
After June 25, 1987 Ann Wynia (DFL-St. Paul)

House Minority Leader
William R. Schreiber (IR-Brooklyn Park)

== Members ==
=== Senate ===
Name	District	City	Party
Adkins, Betty	22	St. Michael	DFL
Anderson, Don A.	12	Wadena	IR
Beckman, Tracy	29	Bricelyn	DFL
Belanger, William	41	Bloomington	IR
Benson, Duane	32	Lanesboro	IR
Berg, Charlie	11	Chokio	DFL
Berglin, Linda	60	Minneapolis	DFL
Bernhagen, John	21	Hutchinson	IR
Bertram, Joe	16	Paynesville	DFL
Brandl, John	62	Minneapolis	DFL
Brataas, Nancy	33	Rochester	IR
Chmielewski, Florian	14	Sturgeon Lake	DFL
Cohen, Dick	64	St. Paul	DFL
Dahl, Gregory	50	Coon Rapids	DFL
Davis, Chuck	18	Princeton	DFL
Decker, Bob	04	Bemidji	IR
DeCramer, Gary	27	Ghent	DFL
Dicklich, Ron	05	Hibbing	DFL
Diessner, Bill	56	Afton	DFL
Frank, Don	51	Spring Lake Park	DFL
Frederick, Mel	30	Owatonna	IR
Frederickson, Dave	20	Murdock	DFL
Frederickson, Dennis	23	New Ulm	IR
Freeman, Michael O.	40	Richfield	DFL
Gustafson, Jim	08	Duluth	IR
Hughes, Jerome M.	54	Maplewood	DFL
Johnson, Dean	15	Willmar	IR
Johnson, Doug	06	Tower	DFL
Jude, Tad	48	Maple Grove	DFL
Knaak, Fritz	53	White Bear Lake	IR
Knutson, Howard A.	38	Burnsville	IR
Kroening, Carl	57	Minneapolis	DFL
Laidig, Gary	55	Stillwater	IR
Langseth, Keith	09	Glyndon	DFL
Lantry, Marilyn	67	St. Paul	DFL
Larson, Cal	10	Fergus Falls	IR
Lessard, Bob	03	International Falls	DFL
Luther, Bill	47	Brooklyn Park	DFL
Marty, John	63	Roseville	DFL
McQuaid, Phyllis W.	44	Saint Louis Park	IR
Mehrkens, Lyle	26	Red Wing	IR
Merriam, Gene	49	Coon Rapids	DFL
Metzen, James	39	South St. Paul	DFL
Moe, Donald	65	St. Paul	DFL
Moe, Roger	02	Erskine	DFL
Morse, Steven	34	Dakota	DFL
Novak, Steve	52	New Brighton	DFL
Olson, Gen	43	Minnetrista	IR
Pehler, Jim	17	St. Cloud	DFL
Peterson, Donna C.	61	Minneapolis	DFL
Peterson, Randolph W.	19	Wyoming	DFL
Piper, Pat	31	Austin	DFL
Pogemiller, Larry	58	Minneapolis	DFL
Purfeerst, Clarence	25	Faribault	DFL
Ramstad, Jim	45	Minnetonka	IR
Reichgott Junge, Ember	46	New Hope	DFL
Renneke, Earl	35	Le Sueur	IR
Samuelson, Don	13	Brainerd	DFL
Schmitz, Robert J.	36	Jordan	DFL
Solon, Sam	07	Duluth	DFL
Spear, Allan	59	Minneapolis	DFL
Storm, Don	42	Edina	IR
Stumpf, LeRoy	01	Thief River Falls	DFL
Taylor, Glen	24	Mankato	IR
Vickerman, Jim	28	Tracy	DFL
Waldorf, Gene	66	St. Paul	DFL
Wegscheid, Darril	37	Apple Valley	DFL
Willet, Gerald	04	Park Rapids	DFL

=== House of Representatives ===
Name	District	City	Party
Anderson, Bob	10B	Ottertail	IR
Anderson, Glen H.	20A	Bellingham	DFL
Battaglia, David Peter	06A	Two Harbors	DFL
Bauerly, Jerry	18B	Sauk Rapids	DFL
Beard, Pat	56B	Cottage Grove	DFL
Begich, Joseph	06B	Eveleth	DFL
Bennett, Tony	53A	Shoreview	IR
Bertram, Jeff	16B	Paynesville	DFL
Bishop, Dave	33B	Rochester	IR
Blatz, Kathleen	41B	Bloomington	IR
Boo, Ben	08B	Duluth	IR
Brown, Chuck	11A	Appleton	DFL
Burger, John	43A	Long Lake	IR
Carlson, Doug	14B	Sandstone	IR
Carlson, Lyndon	46B	Crystal	DFL
Carruthers, Phil	47B	Brooklyn Center	DFL
Clark, Karen	60A	Minneapolis	DFL
Clausnitzer, Dale	48A	Maple Grove	IR
Cooper, Roger	21B	Bird Island	DFL
Dauner, Marvin	09B	Hawley	DFL
Dawkins, Andy	65A	St. Paul	DFL
DeBlieck, Norman R.	27A	Milroy	DFL
Dempsey, Terry	23A	New Ulm	IR
DeRaad, Dale L.	30B	Waseca	IR
Dille, Steve	21A	Dassel	IR
Dorn, John	24A	Mankato	DFL
Forsythe, Mary	42B	Edina	IR
Frederick, Sal	24B	Mankato	IR
Frerichs, Don	32A	Rochester	IR
Greenfield, Lee	61A	Minneapolis	DFL
Gruenes, Dave	17B	St. Cloud	IR
Gutknecht, Gil	33A	Rochester	IR
Hartle, Dean	30A	Owatonna	IR
Haukoos, Bob	31A	Albert Lea	IR
Heap, Jim	45B	Plymouth	IR
Himle, John	41A	Bloomington	IR
Hugoson, Gene	29A	Granada	IR
Jacobs, Joel	49B	Coon Rapids	DFL
Jaros, Mike	07B	Duluth	DFL
Jefferson, Jeff	57B	Minneapolis	DFL
Jennings, Loren Geo	19B	Harris	DFL
Jensen, Robert C.	36B	Lakeville	DFL
Johnson, Alice	51A	Spring Lake Park	DFL
Johnson, Bob	04A	Bemidji	DFL
Johnson, Virgil	34A	Caledonia	IR
Kahn, Phyllis	58B	Minneapolis	DFL
Kalis, Henry	29B	Walters	DFL
Kelly, Randy	67A	St. Paul	DFL
Kelso, Becky	36A	Shakopee	DFL
Kinkel, Tony	04B	Park Rapids	DFL
Kludt, Kenneth J.	09A	Moorhead	DFL
Knickerbocker, Jerry	43B	Minnetonka	IR
Knuth, Daniel	52B	New Brighton	DFL
Kostohryz, Dick	54B	North St. Paul	DFL
Krueger, Rick	12B	Staples	DFL
Larsen, Ernest A.	50A	Ramsey	DFL
Lasley, Harold	19A	Cambridge	DFL
Lieder, Bernard	02A	Crookston	DFL
Long, Dee	59A	Minneapolis	DFL
Marsh, Marcus M.	17A	Sauk Rapids	IR
McDonald, K. J.	35B	Watertown	IR
McEachern, Bob	22A	St. Michael	DFL
McKasy, Bert	39A	Mendota Heights	IR
McLaughlin, Peter	60B	Minneapolis	DFL
McPherson, Harriet	55B	Stillwater	IR
Milbert, Bob	39B	South St. Paul	DFL
Miller, Howard G.	20B	Redwood Falls	IR
Minne, Lona	05B	Hibbing	DFL
Morrison, Connie	38A	Burnsville	IR
Munger, Willard	07A	Duluth	DFL
Murphy, Mary	08A	Hermantown	DFL
Nelson, Clair	11B	Barrett	DFL
Nelson, Darby	49A	Champlin	DFL
Nelson, Ken	62A	Minneapolis	DFL
Neuenschwander, Bob	03A	International Falls	DFL
Norton, Fred C.	65A	St. Paul	DFL
O'Connor, Rich	66B	St. Paul	DFL
Ogren, Paul Anders	14A	Aitkin	DFL
Olsen, Sally	44A	Saint Louis Park	IR
Olson, Edgar	02B	Fosston	DFL
Olson, Katy	28B	Sherburn	DFL
Omann, Bernie	16A	St. Joseph	IR
Onnen, Tony	22B	Cokato	IR
Orenstein, Howard	64B	St. Paul	DFL
Osthoff, Tom	66A	St. Paul	DFL
Otis, Todd	59B	Minneapolis	DFL
Ozment, Dennis	37B	Rosemount	IR
Pappas, Sandy	65B	St. Paul	DFL
Pauly, Sidney	42A	Eden Prairie	IR
Pelowski, Gene	34B	Winona	DFL
Peterson, J.P.	18A	Princeton	DFL
Poppenhagen, Dennis	10A	Detroit Lakes	IR
Price, Leonard	56A	Woodbury	DFL
Quinn, Joe	50B	Coon Rapids	DFL
Quist, Allen	23B	St. Peter	IR
Redalen, Elton	32B	Fountain	IR
Reding, Leo	31B	Austin	DFL
Rest, Ann	46A	New Hope	DFL
Rice, Jim	57A	Minneapolis	DFL
Richter, Don	12A	Wadena	IR
Riveness, Phil	40B	Bloomington	DFL
Rodosovich, Peter	25B	Faribault	DFL
Rose, John	63A	Roseville	IR
Rukavina, Tom	05A	Virginia	DFL
Sarna, John	58A	Minneapolis	DFL
Schafer, Gary	35A	Gibbon	IR
Scheid, Linda	47A	Brooklyn Park	DFL
Schoenfeld, Jerry E.	30B	Waseca	DFL
Schreiber, Bill	48B	Brooklyn Park	IR
Seaberg, Art	38B	Eagan	IR
Segal, Gloria	44B	St. Louis Park	DFL
Shaver, Craig H.	45A	Wayzata	IR
Simoneau, Wayne	51B	Fridley	DFL
Skoglund, Wes	61B	Minneapolis	DFL
Solberg, Loren	03B	Bovey	DFL
Sparby, Wally	01B	Thief River Falls	DFL
Stanius, Brad	53B	White Bear Lake	IR
Steensma, Andy	27B	Luverne	DFL
Sviggum, Steve	26A	Kenyon	IR
Swenson, Doug	55A	Forest Lake	IR
Thiede, Paul M.	13A	Pequot Lakes	IR
Tjornhom, Chris	40A	Richfield	IR
Tompkins, Eileen	37A	Apple Valley	IR
Trimble, Steve	67B	St. Paul	DFL
Tunheim, Jim	01A	Kennedy	DFL
Uphus, Sylvester	15A	Sauk Centre	IR
Valento, Don	54A	Little Canada	IR
Vanasek, Robert	25A	New Prague	DFL
Vellenga, Kathleen	64A	St. Paul	DFL
Voss, Gordon	52A	Blaine	DFL
Wagenius, Jean	62B	Minneapolis	DFL
Waltman, Bobby Joe	26B	Elgin	IR
Welle, Alan	15B	Willmar	DFL
Wenzel, Steve	13B	Little Falls	DFL
Winter, Ted	28A	Fulda	DFL
Wynia, Ann	63B	St. Paul	DFL

== Membership changes ==
=== Senate ===
District	Vacated by	Reason for change	Successor	Date successor seated
04	Gerald Willet (DFL)	Resigned November 15, 1987, in order to accept appointment to the position of Commissioner to the Minnesota Pollution Control Agency.	Bob Decker (IR)	November 16, 1987
37	Darril Wegscheid (DFL)	Resigned January 1, 1989, in order to devote more time to his career.	Remained vacant	

=== House of Representatives ===
District	Vacated by	Reason for change	Successor	Date successor seated
65A	Fred C. Norton (DFL)	Resigned June 25, 1987, in order to accept appointment to serve on the Minnesota Court of Appeals.	Andy Dawkins (DFL)	November 12, 1987
30B	Jerry E. Schoenfeld (DFL)	Resigned September 2, 1987, to accept appointment as Director of the Rural Development Board in the Minnesota Department of Trade and Economic Development.	Dale L. DeRaad (IR)	November 12, 1987
63A	John Rose (IR)	Died in office July 19, 1988, following intestinal surgery at St. John's Northeast Hospital in Maplewood, Minnesota.	Remained vacant	
52B	Daniel Knuth (DFL)	Resigned September 7, 1988, to accept appointment to a Deputy Chair position on the Minnesota Waste Management Board.	Remained vacant	

== Notes ==
Preceded by Seventy-fourth Minnesota Legislature	Seventy-fifth Minnesota Legislature; 1987—1989	Succeeded by Seventy-sixth Minnesota Legislature
