= Senator Decker =

Senator Decker may refer to:

- Bob Decker (1922–1999), Minnesota State Senate
- Edward Decker (1827–1911), Wisconsin State Senate
- Russ Decker (born 1953), Wisconsin State Senate
