= Princeton High School (Minnesota) =

Location
- 807 Eighth Avenue South; Princeton, Minnesota 55371; United States; 45.5601°N 93.5856°W

Information
- Type: Public High School
- School district: Princeton Independent School District 477
- Principal: Ryan Jensen
- Teaching staff: 52.51 (on an FTE basis)
- Grades: 9–12
- Enrollment: 974 (2023-2024)
- Student to teacher ratio: 18.55
- Campus type: Suburb
- Colors: Orange and Black
- Mascot: Tiger
- Website: Princeton Independent School District

Princeton High School is a public secondary school located on 807 Eighth Avenue South in Princeton Minnesota, United States. The school is part of the Princeton Independent School District 477.

== Academics ==
Princeton High School operates on an 7:50 a.m. to 2:40 p.m. schedule, which includes six class periods and a sixty-minute lunch/advisory period. Students may not leave campus during this time due to the school's closed campus policy (with the exception of being taken to lunch by a parent or guardian).

== "Coke Geysers" world record attempt ==
The Princeton High School Student Council organized a community effort to break the world record for simultaneously erupting coke geysers on May 27, 2011. The current record - 2,854 bottles - was set in October 2010 in the Philippines. Hundreds of students participated with a goal of setting off a series of 3,000 geysers, a figure they exceeded with 3,051 total simultaneous eruptions. However, Guinness Book of World Record personnel did not officiate the event and never made the record official. Students say the idea grew from a plan for a graduation prank into a way to put their small town on the map. A video of the attempt was broadcast on Minnesota NBC News affiliate Kare 11 and edited by a YouTube user named Physics314Nerd.

== Notable alumni ==
- Jerome P. Peterson (1954), former member of the Minnesota House of Representatives
- Charles R. Davis (1963), former member of the Minnesota Senate
- Bob Backlund (1967), professional wrestler, WWE Hall of Famer
- Paul Sather (1990), basketball coach for the North Dakota Fighting Hawks
- Clay Matvick (1991), sportscaster
- Jared Berggren (2009), basketball player who played overseas
