= Pat Pariseau =

American politician (1936–2020)

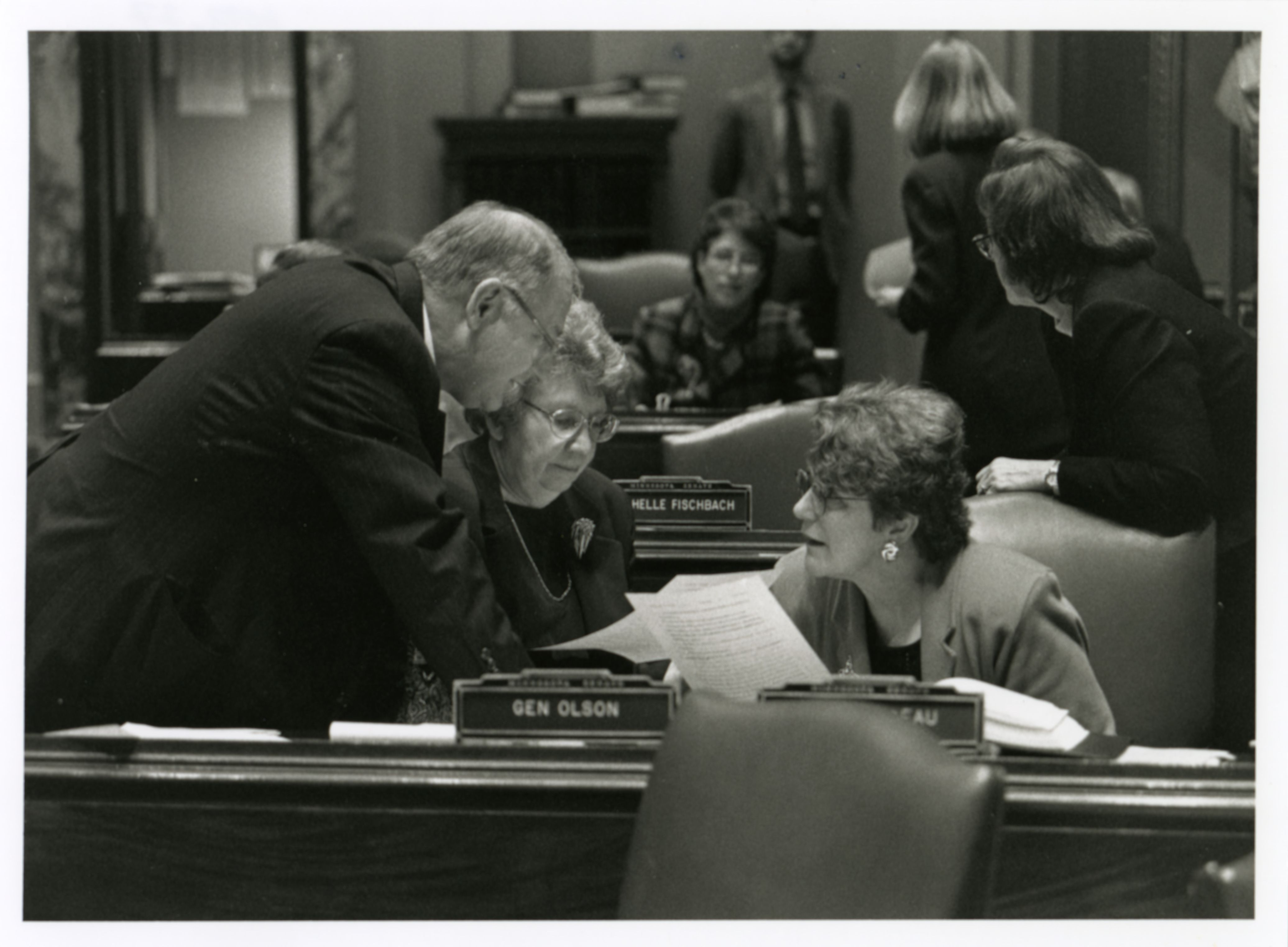

Member of the Minnesota Senate from the 36th district
- In office January 3, 1989 – January 4, 2011
- Preceded by: Darril Wegscheid
- Succeeded by: Dave Thompson

Personal details
- Born: August 10, 1936 (age 90) Saint Paul, Minnesota, United States
- Died: November 13, 2020 Farmington, Minnesota, United States
- Party: Republican Party of Minnesota
- Spouse: Ken Pariseau (deceased)
- Children: 6
- Education: Ravenswood Hospital School of Nursing (R.N.)
- Occupation: Registered nurse, legislator

Patricia "Pat" (née Wright) Pariseau (August 10, 1936 – November 13, 2020) was an American nurse, politician, and a former member of the Minnesota Senate who represented District 36, which includes portions of Dakota, Goodhue, Scott and Washington counties in the southern Twin Cities metropolitan area. A Republican, she was first elected to the Senate in a 1988 special election held after the resignation of Senator Darril Wegscheid. She was re-elected in 1990, 1992, 1996, 2000, 2002 and 2006. Prior to the 1992 legislative redistricting, she represented the old District 37. On February 22, 2010, she announced that she would not seek an eighth term.

Pariseau was a member of the Senate's Environment and Natural Resources Committee, the Finance Committee, and the Judiciary Committee. She also served on the Environment and Natural Resources Subcommittee for Public Lands and Waters, and on the Finance subcommittees for the Economic Development and Housing Budget Division, the Environment, Energy and Natural Resources Budget Division, and the Environment, Energy and Natural Resources Budget Division-Natural Resources. Her special legislative concerns included taxes, health issues, agriculture, business and jobs, environment and sporting issues, airport planning, natural resources, and corrections. She was an assistant minority leader from 1991 to 1994.

Pariseau was born in Saint Paul, Minnesota. She was a retired registered nurse. She graduated from Ravenswood Hospital School of Nursing in Chicago, Illinois. She and her late husband, Ken, farmed near Farmington, and parented six children. Before running for the Senate, she served on the Farmington School Board and also worked as an aide to U.S. Senator Rudy Boschwitz in his Saint Paul office. Pariseau died in Farmington, Minnesota and had suffered from dementia.

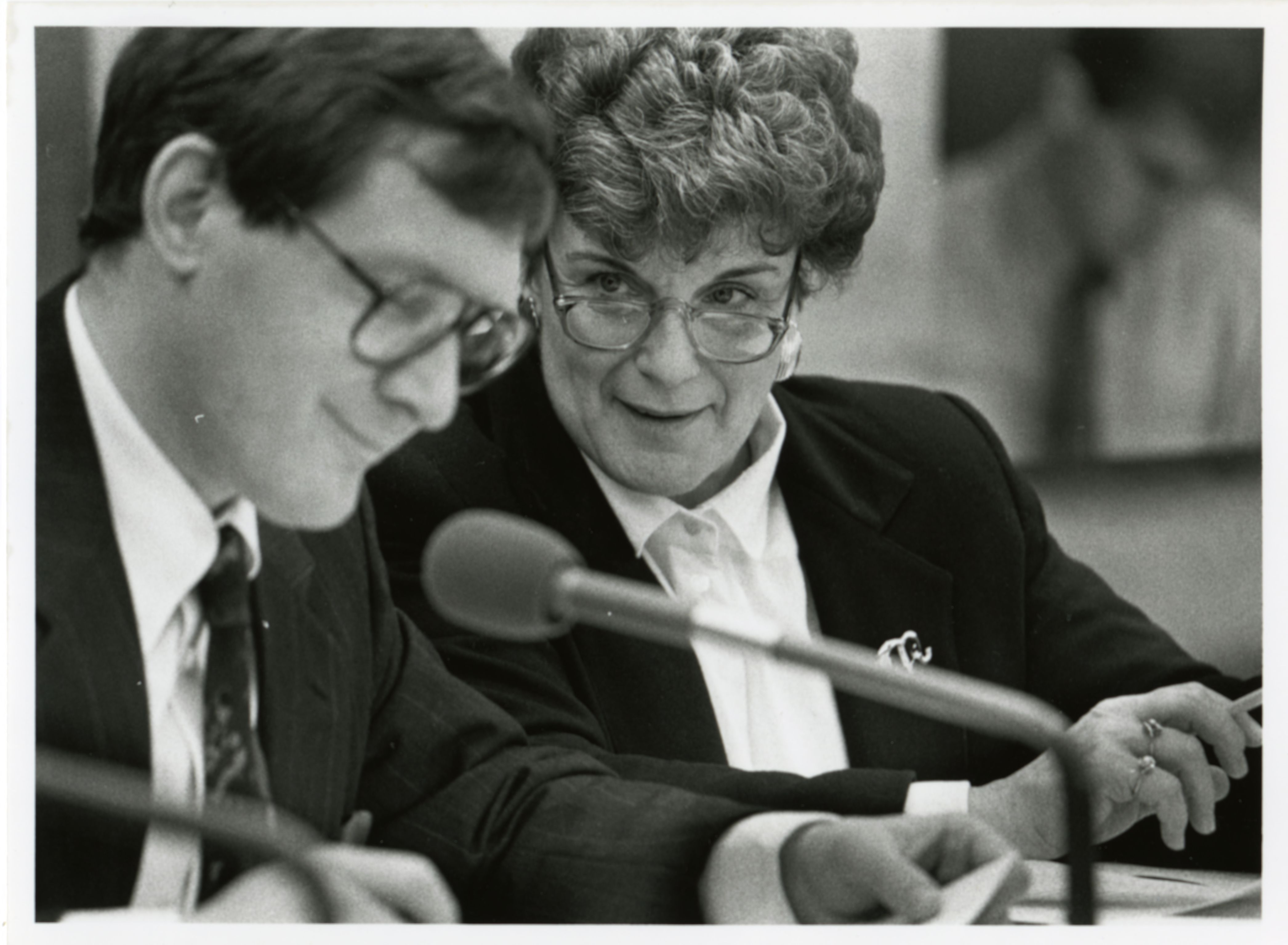
Senator Pat Pariseau and Senator Mark Piepho confer during a committee hearing, St. Paul, Minnesota.
