= Phil Riveness =

American politician

Member of the Minnesota Senate from the 40th district
- In office 1991–1996

Member of the Minnesota House of Representatives from the 40B district
- In office 1983–1988

Personal details
- Born: December 14, 1947 (age 78) Karlstad, Minnesota, U.S.
- Party: Democratic (DFL)
- Spouse: Gail Coffin
- Children: 3
- Education: Bemidji State University; University of Minnesota
- Occupation: consultant

Phillip J. Riveness (born December 14, 1947) is an American politician in the state of Minnesota. He served in the Minnesota House of Representatives and the Minnesota Senate.

== Career ==
While in the Minnesota House of Representatives, Riveness served as Assistant Majority Leader.

He was unseated in November 1988 by Independent-Republican Joyce Henry. They had run against each other two years previous, with Henry winning by 355 votes this time.

In the 1992 Minnesota Senate elections, Riveness was challenged by Barbara Mattson.
