= Gerald Willet =

American politician, businessman, and heavy equipment operator

Gerald Leroy Willet

Member of the Minnesota Senate from the 4th district 65th (1971-1972)
- In office January 5, 1971 – November 14, 1987
- Preceded by: Robert V. Leiseth
- Succeeded by: Bob Decker

Personal details
- Born: October 31, 1934
- Died: September 10, 2017 (aged 82)
- Party: Minnesota Democratic Farmer-Labor Party

Gerald (Jerry) Leroy Willet (October 31, 1934 – September 10, 2017) was an American politician, businessman, and heavy equipment operator.

Willet was born in Duluth, Minnesota. He grew up on a farm in rural Laporte, Minnesota and graduated from Laporte High School in 1952. After high school, he traveled to the United States working as a heavy equipment operator until 1964. He then moved his family back to Minnesota where he owned and operated a furniture store in Park Rapids, Minnesota. He served on the Civil Air Patrol. Willet served in the Minnesota Senate from 1971 to 1988 and was a Democrat. He was then appointed by the Governor, Rudy Perpich, as the Commissioner of the Minnesota Pollution Control Agency. Willet died at the Frazee Care Center in Frazee, Minnesota.
