= Dave Thompson (Minnesota politician) =

American politician

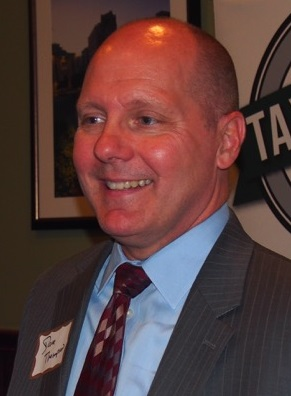

Member of the Minnesota Senate from the 58th district 36th (2011–2013)
- In office January 4, 2011 – January 2, 2017
- Preceded by: Pat Pariseau
- Succeeded by: Matt Little

Personal details
- Born: October 2, 1961 (age 65) Little Falls, Minnesota, U.S.
- Party: Republican Party of Minnesota
- Spouse: Rhonda (m. 1985)
- Children: Amanda; Phil
- Education: University of North Dakota (BA); University of Minnesota Law School (JD)

David A. Thompson (born October 2, 1961) is a Minnesota politician and former member of the Minnesota Senate. A member of the Republican Party of Minnesota, he represented District 58, which included portions of Dakota and Goodhue counties in the southern Twin Cities metropolitan area. He is also a former radio personality. Thompson was a candidate for the Republican nomination for governor in 2014.

== Early life, education, and career ==
After spending his early years in Little Falls, Thompson moved with his mother and sister to East Grand Forks. He graduated from East Grand Forks Senior High School in 1980. In 1984, he graduated from the University of North Dakota with majors in economics and political science. He received his law degree from the University of Minnesota Law School in 1987, and is a practicing attorney.

== The Dave Thompson Show ==
Thompson hosted The Dave Thompson Show for seven and a half years. The radio talk show aired on KSTP in the Twin Cities metropolitan area. He also authored the accompanying blog "And Another Thing", and was a regular participant in the debate segment known as "Face Off" on KSTP-TV's Emmy-winning news program "At Issue with Tom Hauser".

Thompson's show promoted generally conservative views, while rejecting some aspects of neoconservatism. The content was mostly political, but Thompson occasionally discussed sports, culture and other lighter topics, and allowed callers to become a part of the show. The show's opening theme promoted him as "an ordinary man with extraordinary insights".

== Minnesota Senate ==
When longtime State Senator Pat Pariseau announced she would not seek reelection in 2010, Thompson announced his candidacy for the position, gaining the outgoing senator's endorsement. He subsequently received the GOP endorsement and won the November general election with 63.05% of the vote, to DFL challenger Steve Quist's 36.84%. Thompson was reelected in 2012.

In 2012, Thompson and Steve Drazkowski proposed an Employee Freedom Constitutional Amendment, which would require a statewide referendum on amending the Minnesota Constitution to include a right-to-work clause allowing workers to choose whether to join a union.

Thompson did not seek re-election in 2016.

== Personal life ==
Thompson and his wife, Rhonda, have been married since 1985. They are parents of two children.
