= Diane Wray Williams =

American politician (1938–2025)

Member of the Minnesota House of Representatives from the 9A district
- In office January 2, 1989 – January 6, 1991
- Preceded by: Kenneth J. Kludt
- Succeeded by: Kevin Goodno

Personal details
- Born: January 23, 1938 Fremont, Ohio, U.S.
- Died: July 31, 2025 (aged 87) Moorhead, Minnesota, U.S.

Diane Wray Williams (January 23, 1938 – July 31, 2025) was an American businesswoman, educator, and politician.

Williams was born in Fremont, Ohio. She graduated from Syracuse University, in 1959, with a bachelor's degree in English. Williams lived in Moorhead, Minnesota with her husband and family. She was a business owner and a teacher. Williams served in the Minnesota House of Representatives in 1989 and 1990 and was a Democrat. She then served on the Moorhead City Council in 2004. In 2011, Williams retired from the city council stating ""It's time for me to move on. I don't think people should go on and on."

Williams died on July 31, 2025, in Moorhead, Minnesota at the age of 87 from cancer.
