= Dick Pellow =

American politician (1931–2019)

Member of the Minnesota House of Representatives from the 52B district
- In office 1995–1996
- In office 1989–1992

Personal details
- Born: July 20, 1931 Minneapolis, Minnesota, U.S.
- Died: December 23, 2019 (aged 88)
- Party: Republican
- Spouse: Jean
- Children: 5
- Occupation: businessman

Richard Maurice Pellow (July 20, 1931 – December 23, 2019) was an American businessman and politician in the state of Minnesota.

== Political career ==
He served in the Minnesota House of Representatives from 1989 to 1992 and in 1995 and 1996. He was a Republican.

== Background ==
Pellow was born in Minneapolis, Minnesota. Pellow worked as a switchman for the Great Northern Railroad. He served in the United States Navy reserve and went to the Minneapolis Vocational School. Pellow owned an automobile towing business, body shop, and salvage yard.
