= Mark Piepho =

American politician (born 1952)

Mark J. Piepho (born November 28, 1952) was an American politician and businessman.

Piepho was born in Albert Lea, Minnesota. He lived in Rochester, Minnesota with his family and graduated from Rochester Lourdes High School in 1971 and then graduated from Rochester Community and Technical College with an associate degree. He had worked for the Minnesota Department Transportation office in Rochester, Minnesota. Piepho also received his bachelor's degree in political science from University of St. Thomas and his master's degree in public administration from Minnesota State University, Mankato. In 1975, he moved to Mankato, Minnesota and was the owner of a moving and storage business. Piepho served as mayor of Skyline, Minnesota and was a Republican. Piepho served in the Minnesota House of Representatives from 1979 to 1986 and in the Minnesota Senate in 1989 and 1990.
