= Peter Rodosovich =

Minnesota politician

Peter G. Rodosovich

Minnesota State Representative from District 25B
- In office January 1983 – January 1995
- Preceded by: Lyle Mehrkens
- Succeeded by: Lynda Boudreau

Personal details
- Born: November 21, 1959 (age 66)
- Party: DFL
- Education: University of Minnesota
- Profession: YMCA Executive

Peter George Rodosovich (born November 2, 1959) is a Minnesota politician, a member of the Democratic-Farmer-Labor Party, and a former member of the Minnesota House of Representatives. First elected to the House in 1982 at the age of 23, Rodosovich served six terms in office before retiring in 1995.

Rodosovich served as an Assistant Majority Leader, and chaired the Redistricting Committee during the 1991-92 session.

Rodosovich was a senior executive with the YMCA of Metropolitan Minneapolis. He now serves as the Chief Development Officer of the YMCA of the Greater Twin Cities.
