= Clarence Purfeerst =

American politician

Member of the Minnesota Senate from the 7th, 24th & 25th district
- In office 1971–1991
- Preceded by: Arnin O. Sundet
- Succeeded by: Tom Neuville

Personal details
- Born: June 30, 1928 Faribault, Minnesota
- Died: September 25, 2017 (aged 89) Saint Paul, Minnesota
- Party: Minnesota Democratic-Farmer-Labor Party
- Spouse: Rosie
- Children: 6
- Occupation: farmer, business owner, legislator

Clarence Mark Purfeerst (June 30, 1928 – September 25, 2017) was an American farmer and politician.

Purfeerst served in the Minnesota Senate. A Democrat, he was first elected in 1970, and was re-elected in 1972, 1976, 1980, 1982 and 1986. The Legislature was officially non-partisan until the 1976 elections, and he was a member of the Liberal Caucus during his first two terms.

From the city of Faribault, Purfeerst's district included all or portions of Dakota, Le Sueur, Rice, Scott and Waseca counties, changing somewhat through redistricting in 1972 and 1982. He was a farm owner and a beef and hog feeding operation owner and operator by profession, and also served on the Faribault School Board prior to running for the Senate.

Purfeerst's legislative concerns in office included transportation, agriculture, finance, and natural resources. He was a member of the Senate's Commerce, Employment, Finance, Health, Welfare and Corrections, Natural Resources and Agriculture, Public Utilities and State Regulated Industries, Rules and Administration, Transportation and General Legislation committees, and of various subcommittees relevant to each.

Purfeerst served as chair of the Transportation Committee for 18 years (1973–1991). Known for his malapropisms, he once said as a matter was postponed in his committee, "We'll just let our predecessors figure it out." He was also chair of the Transportation and General Legislation Subcommittee on Highways from 1973 to 1977, the Transportation Subcommittee on Transportation Policy from 1979 to 1981, the Transportation Subcommittee on Highway Safety from 1981 to 1983, the Finance Subcommittee on Joint Claims from 1973 to 1975, and the Finance Subcommittee on State Departments III and Semi-State Affairs from 1975 to 1977. He was Majority Leader Pro Tem from 1987 to 1991.

After retiring, Purfeerst moved to and lived in Saint Paul, Minnesota. He owned and operated farmland in Rice County, and in Rock County in the southwestern part of the state. Purfeerst died on September 25, 2017, at his home in Saint Paul, Minnesota.
