= Patrick D. McGowan =

American politician and law enforcement officer

Patrick D. McGowan (born February 3, 1951) is an American politician and law enforcement officer.

McGowan lived in Maple Grove, Minnesota and served in the United States Air Force. He graduated from Minnesota State University, Mankato with a degree in criminal justice. McGowan served in the Minneapolis Police Department and was commissioned a sergeant. McGowan served in the Minnesota Senate from 1989 to 1994 and was a Republican.

McGowan served as sheriff of Hennepin County, Minnesota from 1995 to 2006.
