= Jim Pehler =

American politician (1942–2021)

Member of the Minnesota Senate from the 17th district
- In office 1981–1990
- Preceded by: N/A
- Succeeded by: Dave Gruenes

Member of the Minnesota House of Representatives from the 17B district
- In office 1973–1980
- Preceded by: Jack I. Kleinbaum
- Succeeded by: Joanne Benson

Personal details
- Born: James Cletus Pehler; February 23, 1942 Grand Rapids, Minnesota, U.S.
- Died: September 22, 2021 (aged 79) St. Cloud, Minnesota, U.S.
- Party: Democratic (DFL)
- Spouse: M. Beverly Rueckert

James Cletus Pehler (February 23, 1942 – September 22, 2021) was an American politician and educator.

Pehler was born in Grand Rapids, Minnesota, and graduated from Fairmont High School in Fairmont, Minnesota, in 1960. He received his bachelor's and master's degrees in communications studies from St. Cloud State University in 1965 and 1967. He worked for several television and radio stations in the St. Cloud area as a student. He then taught in the radio and television area of the St. Cloud State University department of mass communication and was an associate professor. Pehler served in the Minnesota House of Representatives from 1973 to 1980 and in the Minnesota Senate from 1981 to 1990. He was a Democrat. Pehler died at his home in St. Cloud, Minnesota.
