= Arnim O. Sundet =

American businessman and politician

Arnim Orvin Sundet (March 15, 1904 – May 21, 1980) was an American businessman and politician.

Sundet was born in Chatfield, Minnesota and went to the Fillmore County, Minnesota public schools. In 1950, he moved to Faribault, Minnesota and was the owner of Sundet Mobile Homes Sales. Sundet served on the Rice County, Minnesota Fair Board and the local United States Selective Service Board. Sundet served on the Faribault Township Board. He also served on the Rice County Rural School Board and was chairman of the school board. Sundet was a Republican. He served in the Minnesota House of Representatives from 1953 to 1958. Sundet then served in the Minnesota Senate from 1959 to 1970. He died at his home in Faribault, Minnesota.
