= Doug Carlson =

American politician

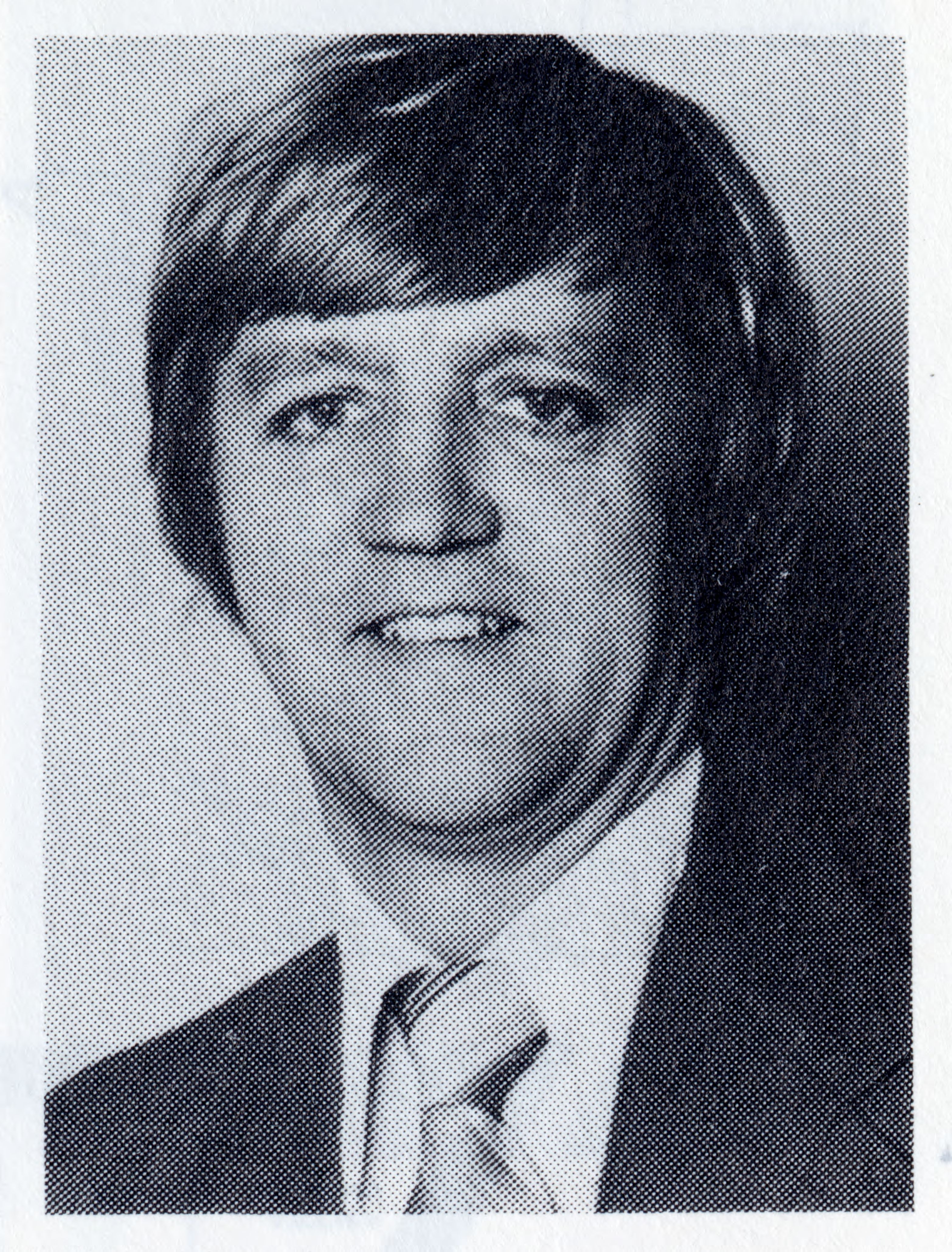
- Carlson c. 1981

Member of the Minnesota House of Representatives
- In office January, 3, 1977 – January 6, 1991
- Governor: Rudy Perpich; Al Quie

Member of the Minnesota House of Representatives
- In office January 1, 1973 – January 5, 1975
- Governor: Wendell R. Anderson

Member of the Minnesota House of Representatives
- In office January 4, 1971 – December 31, 1972
- Governor: Wendell R. Anderson

Personal details
- Born: November 1, 1939 Sandstone, Minnesota, U.S.
- Died: April 22, 2013 (aged 73) Pine City, Minnesota, U.S.
- Resting place: Spring Park Cemetery; Sandstone, Minnesota, U.S.
- Other political affiliations: Republican

Military service
- Allegiance: United States
- Branch/service: United States Air Force
- Years of service: 1963–1965
- Rank: Airman

Douglas Wayne Carlson (November 1, 1939 – April 22, 2013) was an American veterinarian, beef farmer, and politician.

Born in Sandstone, Minnesota, Carlson served in the United States Air Force. He received his bachelor's degree and veterinary science degrees from the University of Minnesota. He served in the Minnesota House of Representatives from 1971 to 1975 and from 1977 to 1991 as a Republican. Later, Carlson served as Pine County, Minnesota commissioner. He died in Pine City, Minnesota.
