= Joel Jacobs =

American politician

Member of the Minnesota House of Representatives from the 47A district
- In office 1973–1982

Member of the Minnesota House of Representatives from the 49B district
- In office 1983–1995

Personal details
- Born: March 31, 1932 (age 94) Pelican Rapids, Minnesota, U.S.
- Party: Democratic (DFL)
- Spouse: Carol
- Children: 6
- Education: Moorhead State University; St. Cloud State University
- Occupation: Business Instructor

Joel Jacobs (born March 31, 1932) is an American politician in the state of Minnesota. He served in the Minnesota House of Representatives from 1973 to 1982 and from 1983 to 1995.
