= Don Storm =

American politician (1932–2019)

Donald A. Storm (June 27, 1932 – January 31, 2019) was an American politician.

Storm was born in Hosmer, South Dakota and grew up in Sheboygan, Wisconsin. He received his degree in divinity and served in several churches. Storm was the executor director of Mental Health Rehabilitation and lived in Edina, Minnesota. Storm served in the Minnesota Senate from 1983 to 1991 and was a Republican. Storm then served as chair of the Minnesota Public Utilities Commission. Storm died in Burnsville, Minnesota.
