= Robert A. Anderson =

American businessman and politician (1932–2006)

- Born: Robert A. Anderson; January 16, 1932; Wadena, Minnesota, U.S.
- Died: October 25, 2006 (aged 74); Ottertail, Minnesota, U.S.
- Education: St. Thomas Academy; University of Miami
- Occupations: Businessperson; Politician

Robert A. "Bob" Anderson (January 16, 1932 – October 25, 2006) was an American businessman and politician.

== Early life and education ==
Anderson was born in Wadena, Minnesota, and graduated from Saint Thomas Academy in Mendota Heights, Minnesota.

He attended the University of Miami, where he earned his degree in finance.

== Career ==
Anderson served in the United States Army during the Korean War and was commissioned a corporal. He was a small business owner and manager. Anderson lived in Ottertail, Minnesota with his wife and family. He served in the Minnesota House of Representatives from 1977 to 1996 and was a Republican.

== Death ==
He died from pancreatic cancer at his home on Otter Tail Lake in Ottertail, Minnesota, on October 25, 2006.
