= Tony L. Bennett =

American politician (1940)

Tony L. Bennett (March 11, 1940 - September 26, 2022) was an American politician and police officer.

Bennett was born in Saint Paul, Minnesota and graduated from Johnson High School in Saint Paul, Minnesota. He went to the University of St. Thomas about business management and to the University of Minnesota. He lived in Saint Paul with his wife and family. Bennett served with the Saint Paul Police Department. He served on the Ramsey County Commission from 1997 to 2012 and was the chair of the county commission in 2006. Bennett was a Republican. He served in the United States Marshals Service from 1990 to 1994. Bennett served in the Minnesota House of Representatives from 1971 to 1974 and from 1983 to 1990.
