= Christopher Tjornhom =

American politician

Chris Tjornhom

Member of the Minnesota House of Representatives from district 40A
- In office January 8, 1985 – January 7, 1991

Personal details
- Born: Christopher M. Tjornhom; March 18, 1959 Richfield, Minnesota, U.S.
- Died: May 29, 2012 (aged 53) Chanhassen, Minnesota, U.S.
- Party: Republican
- Education: Northwestern College

Christopher M. "Chris" Tjornhom (March 18, 1959 – May 29, 2012) was an American businessman, activist, and politician who served as a member of the Minnesota House of Representatives.

== Early life and education ==
Tjornhom was born and raised in Richfield, Minnesota. Tjornhom studied business administration and social science at Northwestern College.

== Career ==
Prior to entering politics, Tjornhom worked as a painting contractor in Richfield, Minnesota. He served in the Minnesota House of Representatives from district 40A from 1985 to 1990 as a Republican. Tjornhom was also a member of the Independent-Republican Party. After leaving the House of Representatives, Tjornhom served as chair of the Carver County Republican Party.

== Personal life ==
Tjornhom and his wife, Bethany, had three children. He died in his sleep at his home in Chanhassen, Minnesota.
