= Glen H. Anderson =

American politician

Glen H. Anderson (born October 24, 1938) was an American politician, farmer, and businessman.

Anderson was born in Lac qui Parle County, Minnesota. He graduated from Bellingham High School in Bellingham, Minnesota. Anderson served in the Minnesota National Guard. He went to Bemidji State University and Concordia College in Moorhead, Minnesota. He lived with his wife and children in Bellingham, Minnesota and was a businessman and a farmer. Anderson served in the Minnesota House of Representatives from 1973 to 1990 and was a Democrat.
