= Pat Beard =

American politician and steelworker

Patrick Wayne "Pat" Beard (September 9, 1947 – February 7, 2017) was an American politician and steelworker.

Born in Saint Paul, Minnesota, Beard graduated from Saint Paul Park Senior High School in 1965. He then served in the United States Navy as a Seabee in South Vietnam during the Vietnam War from 1968 to 1969. Beard thereafter received his bachelor's degree in political science from University of Minnesota. Beard worked as a steelworker for North Star Steel. Beard lived in Cottage Grove, Minnesota. From 1983 to 1994, Beard served in the Minnesota House of Representatives and was a Democrat.

Beard died at Fairview University Hospital in Minneapolis, Minnesota from complications due to exposure to Agent Orange during the Vietnam War.
