= Steve Trimble (politician) =

American politician

Member of the Minnesota House of Representatives from the 67B district
- In office 1987–2000

Personal details
- Born: December 21, 1942 (age 83) Emporia, Kansas, U.S.
- Party: Minnesota Democratic–Farmer–Labor Party
- Spouse: Tracey Baker (div.)
- Children: two
- Education: Southern Methodist University, University of Chicago
- Occupation: college instructor, historian

Steve Trimble (born December 21, 1942) is an American politician in the state of Minnesota. He served in the Minnesota House of Representatives.
