= Art Seaberg =

American politician (1936–2024)

Arthur W. Seaberg (December 10, 1936 – December 19, 2024) was an American state legislator who served in the Minnesota House of Representatives (1983–1993). An attorney by profession, he represented District 38B in Dakota County as an Independent-Republican. As a legislator he was an advocate for domestic abuse victims, and he passed several bills increasing protections for them.

== Life and career ==
Seaberg was born in Minneapolis and attended Central High School in nearby St. Paul. He received a B.A. in political science from Minnesota State University, Mankato in 1961. He went on to receive a LL.B. and J.D. from William Mitchell College of Law. He lived in Mendota Heights and Eagan during his House tenure. Seaberg died at age 88, had six children, three of whom belonged to second wife Joanne LeJeune, and ten grandchildren.

After five terms in the Minnesota House, Seaberg made an unsuccessful run for the Minnesota Senate. (He was succeeded in the House by Tim Pawlenty, who went on to become Governor of Minnesota.) Seaberg returned to politics in 2002, running for an open House seat in District 38A, but lost. In 2010, he publicly endorsed Independence Party candidate Tom Horner for governor, leading him to be temporarily banned from the state Republican Party. The Independents, continued to support the choices and public personae of Mr. Seaberg.
