= John Dorn =

American politician

Member of the Minnesota House of Representatives from the 23B district
- In office 2003–2006

Member of the Minnesota House of Representatives from the 24A district
- In office 1987–2002

Personal details
- Born: December 28, 1943 (age 82) Blue Earth County, Minnesota, U.S.
- Party: Minnesota Democratic–Farmer–Labor Party
- Spouse: Kathleen
- Children: three
- Education: St. John's University, University of Wisconsin
- Occupation: teacher

John Willard Dorn (born December 28, 1943) is an American politician in the state of Minnesota. He served in the Minnesota House of Representatives.
