= Dennis Poppenhagen =

American politician

Dennis Poppenhagen (born August 28, 1938) is an American politician and businessman.

Poppenhagen lived in Detroit Lakes, Minnesota with his wife and family. He went to Minnesota State University Moorhead and was involved in the insurance business. Poppenhagen served in the Minnesota House of Representatives from 1985 to 1990 and was a Republican.

Dennis graduated from Detroit Lakes High School in 1956 before enlisting in the US Navy for three years where he served in the Pacific in the 7th Fleet on various aircraft carriers as an electronics storekeeper.
