= Steve Novak (politician) =

American politician

Member of the Minnesota Senate from the 52nd district
- In office 1983–2000

Member of the Minnesota House of Representatives from the 48A district
- In office 1975–1982

Personal details
- Born: May 26, 1949 (age 77) Hennepin County, Minnesota
- Party: Minnesota Democratic–Farmer–Labor Party
- Spouse: Julie
- Children: four
- Education: Hamline University, University of Minnesota, Duluth
- Occupation: Sales Representative

Steven Glynn Novak (born May 26, 1949) is an American politician in the state of Minnesota.

Novak graduated from Mounds View High School in Mounds View, Minnesota. Novak lived in New Brighton, Minnesota with his wife and family. He went to Hamline University and then received his bachelor's degree in political science from University of Minnesota Duluth. Novak worked as a sales representative. He served in the Minnesota House of Representatives and the Minnesota Senate.
