= Gordon Voss =

American politician and mechanical engineer

Gordon Owen Voss

Member of the Minnesota House of Representatives
- In office 1973–1989

Personal details
- Born: February 25, 1938 Duluth, Minnesota, U.S.
- Died: June 21, 2017 (aged 79) Wayzata, Minnesota, U.S.

Gordon Owen Voss (February 25, 1938 – June 21, 2017) was an American politician and mechanical engineer.

Born in Duluth, Minnesota, Voss received his bachelor's, master's, and doctorate degrees in mechanical engineering from the University of Minnesota. He served on the city planning and zoning commission for Blaine, Minnesota. Voss then served in the Minnesota House of Representatives from 1973 to 1989 and was a Democrat. On January 4, 1989, Voss resigned from the Minnesota Legislature when he was appointed chief administrator of the Minnesota Metropolitan Waste Control Commission.

On June 21, 2017, Voss was killed in an automobile accident in Wayzata, Minnesota, where he lived.
