= Donald J. Frank =

American politician

Donald Joseph Frank
- Born: September 28, 1937; Minnesota, U.S.
- Died: October 13, 1995 (aged 58); Brooklyn Park, Minnesota, U.S.
- Occupation: Politician

Donald Joseph "Don" Frank (September 28, 1937 – October 13, 1995) was an American politician.

== Biography ==
Frank was born in Minnesota and graduated from the University of Minnesota with a degree in geology. He was a businessman and consulting engineer. He lived in Spring Lake Park, Minnesota with his wife and family. Frank served on the Spring Lake Park City Council and was a Democrat. Frank served in the Minnesota Senate from 1981 to 1992. He died in Brooklyn Park, Minnesota at his place of work.
