= Loren Jennings =

American politician

Loren George Jennings

Member of the Minnesota House of Representatives from the 18B district
- In office 1993–2002

Member of the Minnesota House of Representatives from the 19B district
- In office 1985–1992

Personal details
- Born: June 30, 1951 (age 75) Chisago County, Minnesota, U.S.
- Died: September 8, 2023
- Party: Democratic (DFL)
- Spouse: Bonnie
- Children: 3
- Education: Pine Technical and Community College, MN
- Occupation: businessman

Loren George Jennings (born June 30, 1951) was an American politician in the state of Minnesota. He served in the Minnesota House of Representatives from 1993 to 2002. Prior to his career as a Minnesota representative, Jennings also served as county commissioner for Chisago county, as well as alderman for the Rush City Municipal Council.
