= Steven Morse (politician) =

American politician

Member of the Minnesota Senate from the 32nd district
- In office 1993–1999

Member of the Minnesota Senate from the 34th district
- In office 1987–1992

Personal details
- Born: April 22, 1957 (age 69)
- Party: Minnesota Democratic–Farmer–Labor Party
- Education: University of Wisconsin–La Crosse, University of Minnesota, Twin Cities, Michigan State University
- Occupation: Apple Grower/Processor

Steven J. Morse (born April 22, 1957) is an American politician in the state of Minnesota. He served in the Minnesota State Senate.
