= John Bernhagen =

American politician, businessman, and farmer (1934–2020)

Member of the Minnesota Senate from the 21st district
- In office 1983–1991

Member of the Minnesota Senate from the 22nd district
- In office 1973–1982

Member of the Minnesota House of Representatives from the 15A district
- In office 1969–1972

Personal details
- Born: March 19, 1934 (age 92) Hutchinson, Minnesota, U.S.
- Died: September 26, 2020 (aged 86) Hutchinson, Minnesota, U.S.
- Party: Republican
- Spouse: Loretta
- Children: 3
- Education: Metropolitan State University; University of Minnesota; Mankato State University
- Occupation: farmer

John J. Bernhagen (March 19, 1934 – September 26, 2020) was an American politician, businessman, and farmer.

Bernhagen was born in Hutchinson, Minnesota. He graduated from Hutchinson High School in 1952. Bernhagen served in the United States Army from 1954 to 1956. He received his bachelor's degree from Metropolitan State University and his master's degree from Minnesota State University, Mankato. Bernhagen also went to University of Minnesota for graduate studies. Bernhagen was a farmer and business consultant. He served in the Minnesota House of Representatives from 1969 to 1972 and in the Minnesota Senate from 1973 to 1992. Bernhagen was a Republican. He died at his home in Hutchinson, Minnesota.
