= David Peter Battaglia =

American educator and politician

David Peter Battaglia (January 21, 1931 – February 1, 2017) was an American educator and politician.

Born in Buhl, Minnesota, Battaglia went to Martin Hughes High School in Buhl, Minnesota. He received his associate degree from Mesabi Range College, in Virginia, Minnesota. Battaglia received his bachelor's degree from St. Cloud State University in industrial arts education and social studies. He also went to graduate school at the University of Minnesota Duluth. Battaglia moved to Two Harbors, Minnesota in 1953 and was an industrial arts teacher. Battaglia served on the Two Harbors City Council and as mayor of Two Harbors, Minnesota. Battaglia was a Democrat. From 1977 to 1995, Battaglia served in the Minnesota House of Representatives. Battaglia died at a hospital in Duluth, Minnesota.
