= Mary Forsythe =

American politician and music teacher

Mary MacCornack Forsythe
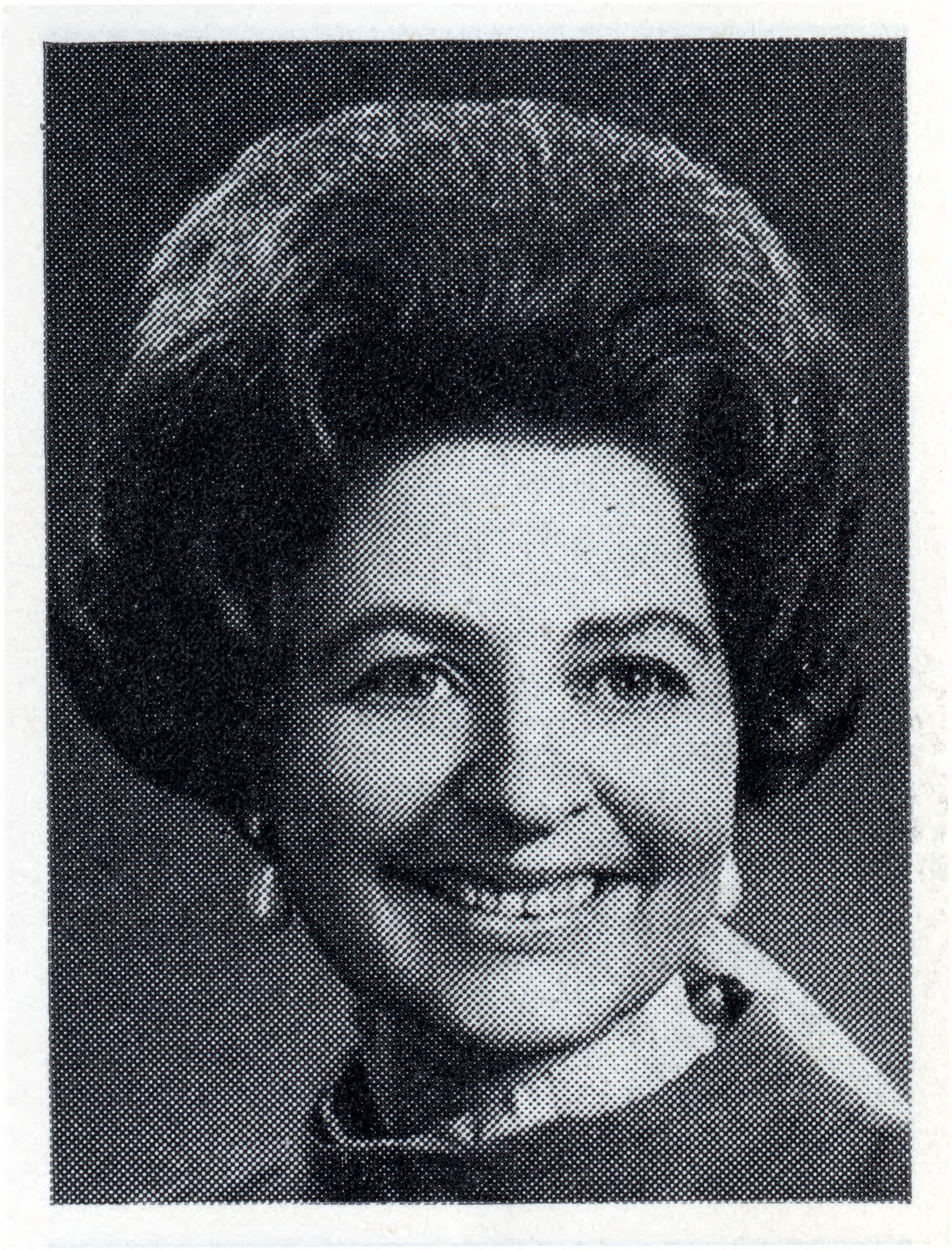

Member of the Minnesota House of Representatives from the 39A (1973-82) and 42B (1983-90) districts
- In office 1973–1991

Mary MacCornack Forsythe (May 23, 1920 – September 6, 2007) was an American politician and music teacher.

Born in Whitehall, Wisconsin, Forsythe graduated from Whitehall High School and then received her bachelor's degree from St. Olaf College in music, where she sang in the St. Olaf Choir. She taught music in elementary and high school. Forsythe lived in Edina, Minnesota.

Forsythe served in the Minnesota House of Representatives from 1973 to 1991 as a Republican. For her entire term in office she served on the Appropriations Committee and chaired it from 1985 to 1986. She was the Assistant Minority Leader from 1981 to 1982. Among her accomplishments in office are improvements to women's prison facilities and programs and the mandatory seat belt law for which she was the chief House sponsor.

She died in Saint Paul, Minnesota.
