= David Bishop (American politician) =

American politician (1929–2020)

Dave Bishop

Member of the Minnesota House of Representatives from the 30B district
- In office 1993–2002

Member of the Minnesota House of Representatives from the 33B district
- In office 1983–1992

Personal details
- Born: March 9, 1929 Syracuse, New York, U.S.
- Died: August 3, 2020 (aged 91)
- Party: Republican
- Spouse: Beatrice Habberstad
- Children: 5
- Education: Hamilton College; John F. Kennedy School of Government; Cornell Law School
- Occupation: attorney

David Tyre Bishop (March 9, 1929 – August 3, 2020) was an American lawyer and politician.

Bishop was born in Syracuse, New York. He graduated from Nottingham High School in Syracuse. He graduated from Hamilton College in 1951 and received his master's degree from the John F. Kennedy School of Government at Harvard University in 1962. Bishop also received his law degree from Cornell Law School in 1954. Bishop lived in Rochester, Minnesota with his wife and family and practiced law. He served in the Minnesota House of Representatives from 1983 to 1992 and 1993 to 2002 as a Republican.
