= Don Valento =

American politician (1933–2023)

Member of the Minnesota House of Representatives from the 54A district
- In office 1983–1992

Member of the Minnesota House of Representatives from the 45A district
- In office 1979–1982

Personal details
- Born: February 22, 1933 St. Paul, Minnesota, U.S.
- Died: August 29, 2023 (aged 90) Maplewood, Minnesota, U.S.
- Party: Republican
- Education: University of Minnesota
- Occupation: Engineer, contractor

Donald John Valento (February 22, 1933 – August 29, 2023) was an American politician in the state of Minnesota. He served in the Minnesota House of Representatives. Valento died in Maplewood, Minnesota on August 29, 2023, at the age of 90.
