= Connie Morrison =

American politician

Constance "Connie" Morrison
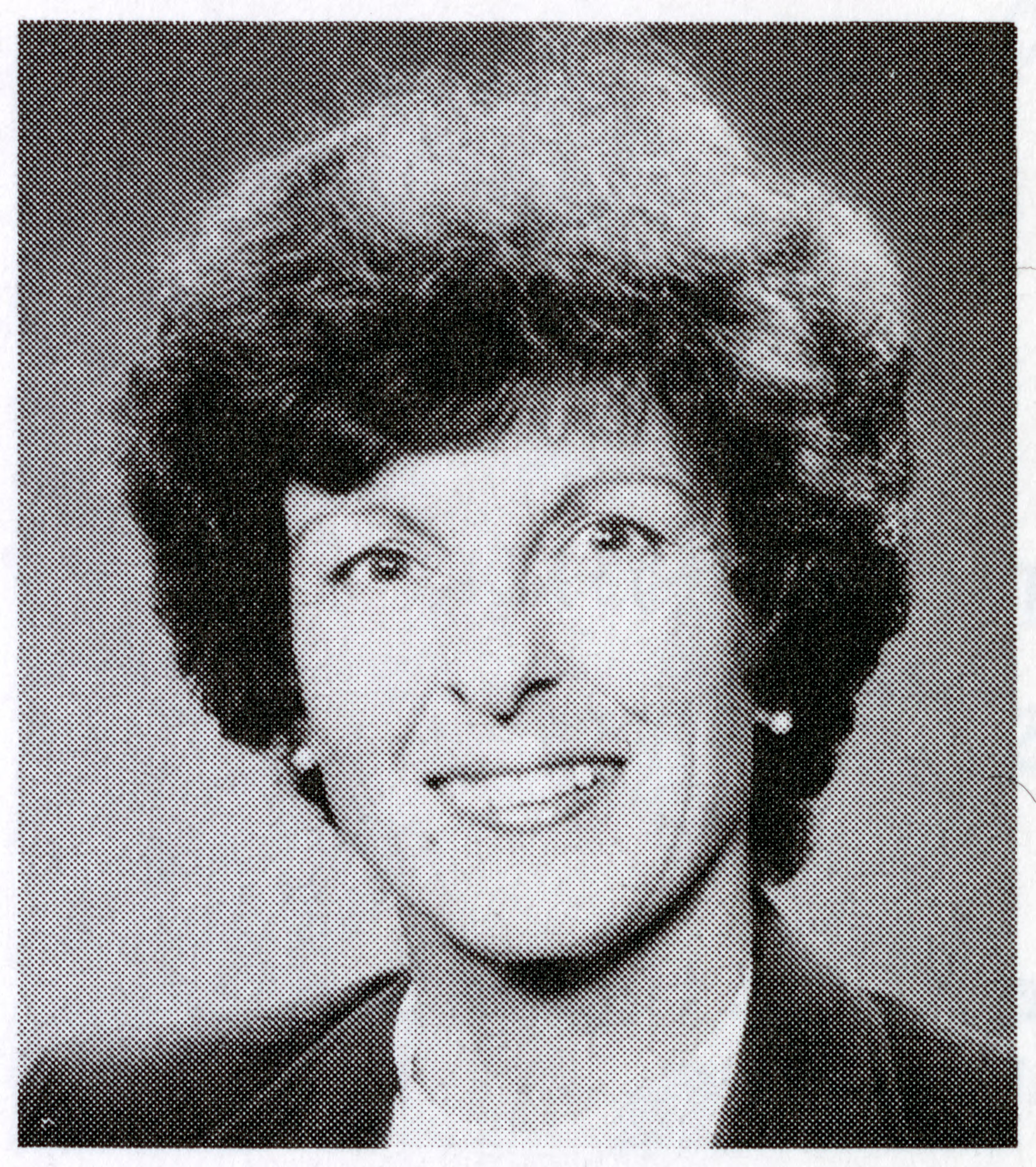

Member of the Minnesota House of Representatives.

Constance "Connie" Morrison was an American politician.

Morrison lived with her husband and family in Burnsville, Minnesota and was involved with the real estate business. Morrison served on the Burnsville City Council from 1977 to 1983 and as mayor of Burnsville from 1983 to 1986. She then served in the Minnesota House of Representatives from 1987 to 1994 and was a Republican.
