= Virgil J. Johnson =

American politician

Member of the Minnesota House of Representatives from the 34A district
- In office 1983–1992

Member of the Minnesota House of Representatives from the 32B district
- In office 1993–1996

Personal details
- Born: April 23, 1932 (age 94)
- Party: Republican
- Spouse: Mary Ann
- Occupation: farmer

Virgil J. Johnson (born April 23, 1932) is an American politician in the state of Minnesota. He served in the Minnesota House of Representatives.
