= Harriet McPherson =

American politician

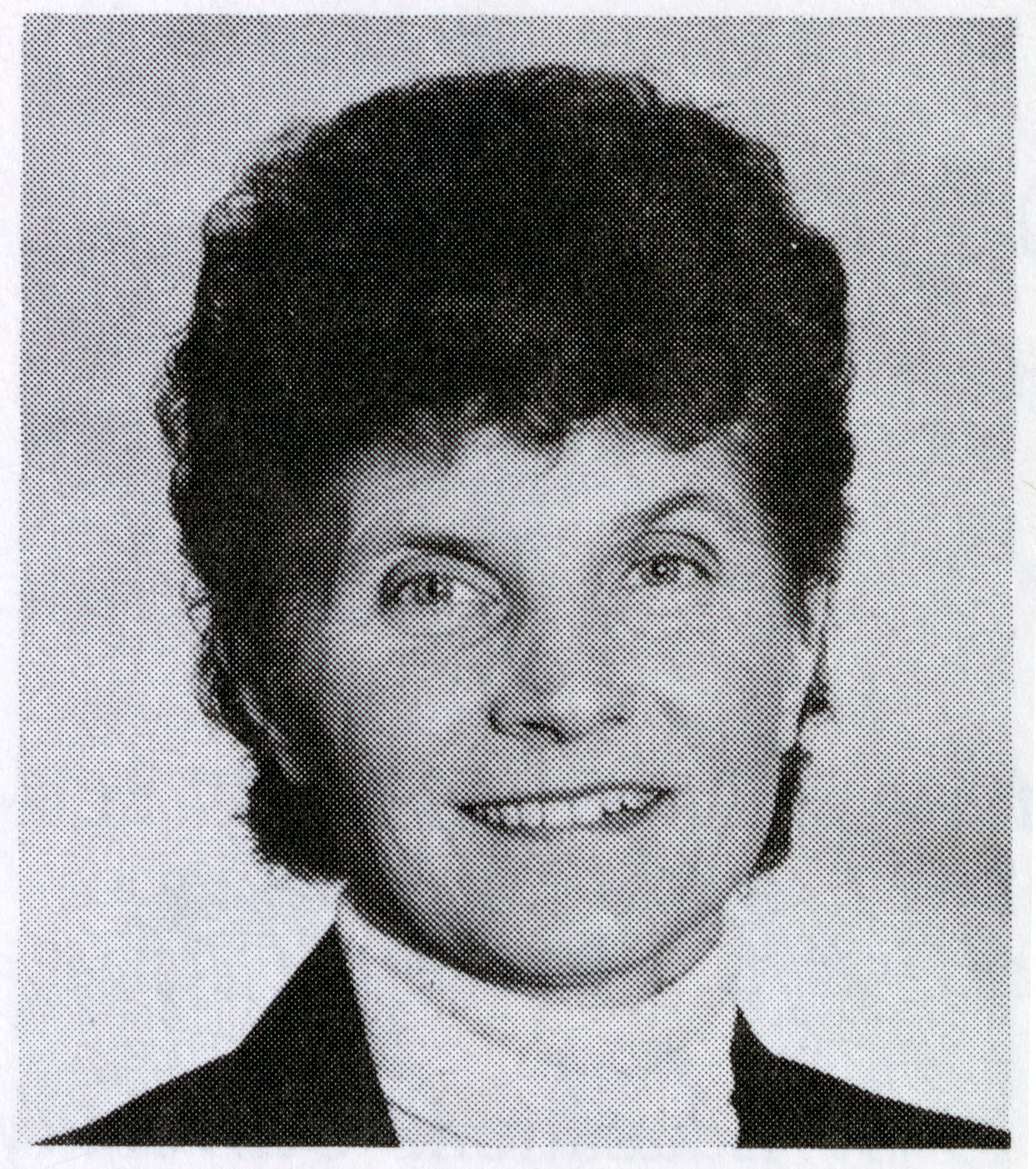

Harriet McPherson was an American politician, dairy farmer, and educator.

McPherson lived in Stillwater, Minnesota, with her husband and family, and was a dairy farmer. She graduated from Winona State University with a bachelor's degree in elementary education. She served on the Stillwater School Board and was a Republican. McPherson served in the Minnesota House of Representatives from 1985 to 1992.
