= Charles R. Davis (Minnesota politician, born 1945) =

American politician and educator (1945–2004)

Member of the Minnesota Senate from the 18th district
- In office January 6, 1981 – January 4, 1993

Personal details
- Born: July 12, 1945 Princeton, Minnesota, U.S.
- Died: December 23, 2004 (aged 59) Milaca, Minnesota, U.S.
- Party: Democratic (DFL)
- Education: University of Minnesota
- Profession: Farmer/Vocational Agriculture Instructor

Charles R. Davis (July 12, 1945 – December 23, 2004) was an American politician and educator. Davis lived in Princeton, Minnesota. He received his bachelor's degree in agriculture education from University of Minnesota, in 1968, and his master's degree in education from University of Minnesota, in 1972. Davis taught vocational education at Princeton High School in Princeton, Minnesota and was also a farmer. He also lived in Milaca, Minnesota. Davis served in the Minnesota Senate from 1981 to 1982 and was a Democrat. He died from an automobile accident.
