= Katy Olson =

American state politician (1928–2011)

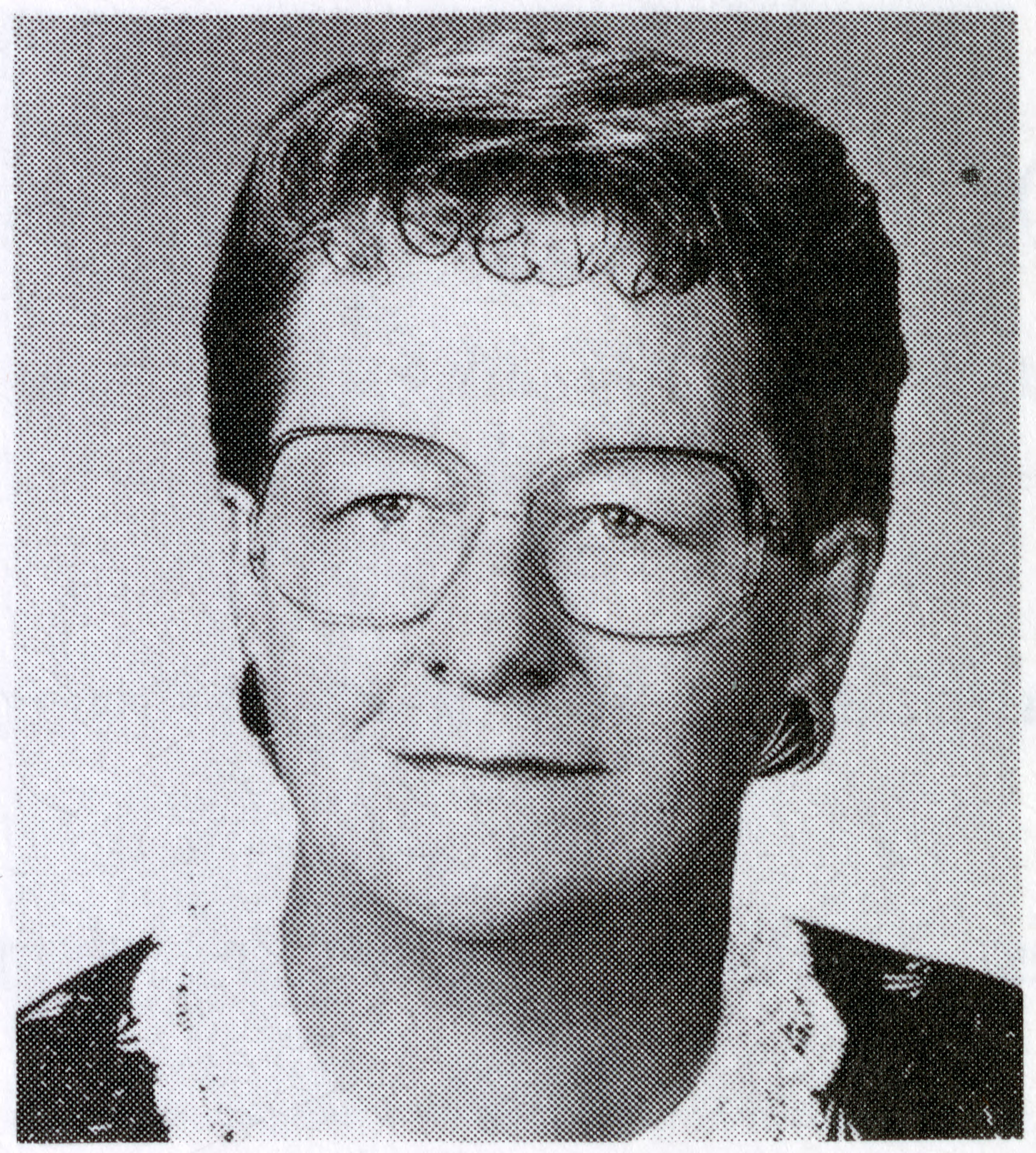

Member of the Minnesota House of Representatives from the 28B, 22B district
- In office January 6, 1987 – January 2, 1995
- Preceded by: Dennis C. Frederickson
- Succeeded by: Elaine Harder

Personal details
- Born: October 24, 1928 Rock Valley, Iowa
- Died: August 14, 2011 (aged 82) Rochester, Minnesota
- Party: Democratic Farmer Labor Party
- Spouse: Robert
- Children: 5
- Education: Minnesota State University, Mankato; Luther College
- Occupation: farmer, political activist

Catherina "Katy" Gaalswyk Olson (October 24, 1928 – August 14, 2011) was a Minnesota politician and a former member of the Minnesota House of Representatives from southwestern Minnesota, United States.

== Service in the Minnesota House ==
Olson was first elected in 1986 in the Democratic-Farmer-Labor Party's "firestorm" that swept through the region. The election gave Democrats unprecedented control of southwestern Minnesota for the next several election cycles. She was re-elected in 1988, 1990, and 1992. She represented the old District 28B and, later, District 22B, which included all or portions of Cottonwood, Jackson, Martin, Redwood, Watonwan, and Brown counties, changing somewhat through redistricting in 1990.

While in the legislature, Olson was a member of the House Agriculture, Education, Rules and Legislative Administration, Transportation and Transit, Economic Development and Housing, and Energy committees, and of various sub-committees relevant to each area. She was chair of the Legislative Commission on the Economic Status of Women from 1991-1993. The commission has since evolved into the Office on the Economic Status of Women. She also served as an assistant majority leader during the 1993-1994 session under House Speaker Dee Long.

== Background and community service ==
From the rural Trimont and Sherburn areas, Olson earned a reputation as a strong advocate for farmers, agricultural issues, and education during her time in office. Prior to being elected to the House, she served on the Trimont School Board and, after her service in the legislature concluded, she served on the Minnesota State Board of Teaching and the Minnesota Region 9 Development Commission.

Olson and her husband, Robert, were the parents of five children. They had farmed in the Trimont area for many years.
