= Clair Nelson =

American politician (1940–2019)

Clair L. Nelson

Member of the Minnesota House of Representatives
- In office 1987–1990

Personal details
- Born: April 22, 1940 Elk Lake Township, Grant County, Minnesota, U.S.
- Died: January 13, 2019 (aged 78) Bismarck, North Dakota, U.S.
- Party: Democratic
- Education: Minnesota State University, Moorhead

Clair L. Nelson (April 22, 1940 – January 13, 2019) was an American politician, businessman, and educator.

Nelson was born in Elk Lake Township, Grant County, Minnesota and graduated from Barrett High School in Barrett, Minnesota. He lived in Barrett, Minnesota with his wife and family. Nelson served in the Minnesota National Guard and graduated from Minnesota State University Moorhead with a bachelor's degree in physical education and mathematics. Nelson served in the Minnesota House of Representatives from 1987 to 1990 and was a Democrat. He was a farmer, builder, and a school teacher. Nelson died at Sanford Health in Bismarck, North Dakota.
