= Bill Diessner =

American politician from Minnesota (1923–2021)

- Diessner c. 1987–1988

Member of the Minnesota Senate from the 56th district
- In office 1983–1990

Personal details
- Born: Ardell William Diessner; July 28, 1923 Minneapolis, Minnesota, U.S.
- Died: March 27, 2021 (aged 97) Mora, Minnesota, U.S.
- Party: Minnesota Democratic–Farmer–Labor Party
- Spouses: Irene (m. 1941; div. 1961); Dorothy Schmidt (m. 1962; died 1999); Sharon Harmon (m. 1999)
- Children: Nine
- Education: University of Minnesota, University of Minnesota Medical School
- Occupation: Physician

Ardell William Diessner (July 28, 1923 – March 27, 2021) was an American politician and medical doctor in the state of Minnesota. He was born in Minneapolis, Minnesota and was raised in Waconia, Minnesota. Diessner graduated from Waconia High School in 1941. Diessner lived in Redwood Falls, Minnesota. He moved to Afton, Minnesota in 1970. He served in the Minnesota State Senate from 1983 to 1990 as a member of the Democratic–Farmer–Labor Party, representing district 56. Diessner was a medical doctor, having graduated from the University of Minnesota. Diessner served in the United States Army from 1951 to 1952 in Fort Riley, Kansas, and Korea and was commissioned a captain. Diessner moved to Bella Vista, Arkansas in 2003. He died at his home in Mora, Minnesota.
