= Jerry Bauerly =

American businessman, farmer, and politician

Gerald J. Bauerly

Member of the Minnesota House of Representatives
- In office 1987–1994

Personal details
- Born: 1943 (age 82–83)
- Party: Democratic
- Education: St. Cloud State University (BA, MA)
- Occupation: Businessman, Farmer, Teacher

Gerald J. "Jerry" Bauerly (born 1943) is an American businessman, farmer, and politician.

Bauerly received his bachelor's and master's degrees in government, political science, and education administration from St. Cloud State University. He lives in Sauk Rapids, Minnesota with his wife and family. Bauerly is a businessman and owner of Bauerly Brothers Construction. He is also a farmer and taught social studies at Sandstone-Finlayson High School. Bauerly served on the Foley School Board and is a member of the Democratic Party. He served in the Minnesota House of Representatives from 1987 to 1994.
