= Rick Krueger =

American politician (born 1949)

Richard "Rick" Krueger (born February 13, 1949) is an American educator and politician.

Born in Saint Paul, Minnesota, Kruger received his bachelor's degree from Winona State University, his master's degree in education from the University of St. Thomas, his master's degree from Harvard University in public administration, and his doctorate degree in educational administration from Harvard University. He was an administrator in the Staples, Minnesota School District. He served in the Minnesota House of Representatives from 1983 to 1994 as a Democrat. After leaving the Minnesota Legislature, Krueger was appointed executive director of the Minnesota Transportation Alliance (MTA). He was then appointed senior government affairs manager for the Global Traffic Technology (GTT).
