= R. Joseph Quinn =

American lawyer

R. Joseph "Joe" Quinn (born August 22, 1942) was an American politician and lawyer.

Quinn was born in Minnesota and lived in Blaine, Minnesota and Coon Rapids, Minnesota with his wife and family. He received his bachelor's degree in English from Saint John's University and his Juris Doctor degree from Hamline University School of Law. Quinn was admitted to the Minnesota bar. Quinn served in the Minnesota House of Representatives from 1983 to 1991 and was a Democrat. Quinn then served as Minnesota Chief District Court Judge.
