= K.J. McDonald =

American politician & businessman (1930–2012)

Kenneth James McDonald (November 28, 1930 – October 4, 2012) was an American politician and businessman.

McDonald was born in Watertown, Minnesota. He went to Watertown High School and to vocational school in Chicago, Illinois. McDonald served in the United States Air Force during the Korean War and was an aerial photographer. McDonald was involved with the insurance business and was a photographer. He served in the Minnesota House of Representatives from 1977 to 1990 and was a Republican. McDonald served as mayor of Watertown from 2005 until his death in 2012. His son Joe McDonald currently serves in the Minnesota Legislature. McDonald died from a brain tumor in Watertown, Minnesota.
