= Jim Rice (Minnesota politician) =

American politician

James Isaac Rice (October 12, 1925 – October 15, 1996) was an American politician.

Rice lived in Minneapolis, Minnesota and graduated from DeLaSalle High School in Minneapolis. He lived in Minneapolis with his wife and family and served in the United States Army during World War II. Rice graduated from the University of Minnesota and worked for the Governor of Minnesota Karl Rolvaag serving as executive secretary. He also served on the Hennepin County Park Commission. Rice served in the Minnesota House of Representatives from 1971 until his death in 1996. He was a Democrat. Rice died suddenly from a heart attack while in his legislative office in Saint Paul, Minnesota.
