= Jerome P. Peterson =

American educator and politician (1936–2018)

Jerome P. "J.P." Peterson (July 14, 1936 – January 25, 2018) was an American educator and politician.

Peterson was born in Braham, Minnesota. He received his bachelor's degree in education from Augsburg College in 1958. He also studied at University of Minnesota and St. Cloud State University. He taught social studies, drivers training, and physical education at Princeton High School in Princeton, Minnesota. He lived in Princeton, Minnesota. Peterson served in the Minnesota House of Representatives from 1983 to 1990 and was a Democrat. Peterson died suddenly in Princeton, Minnesota.
