= Sidney Pauly =

American politician

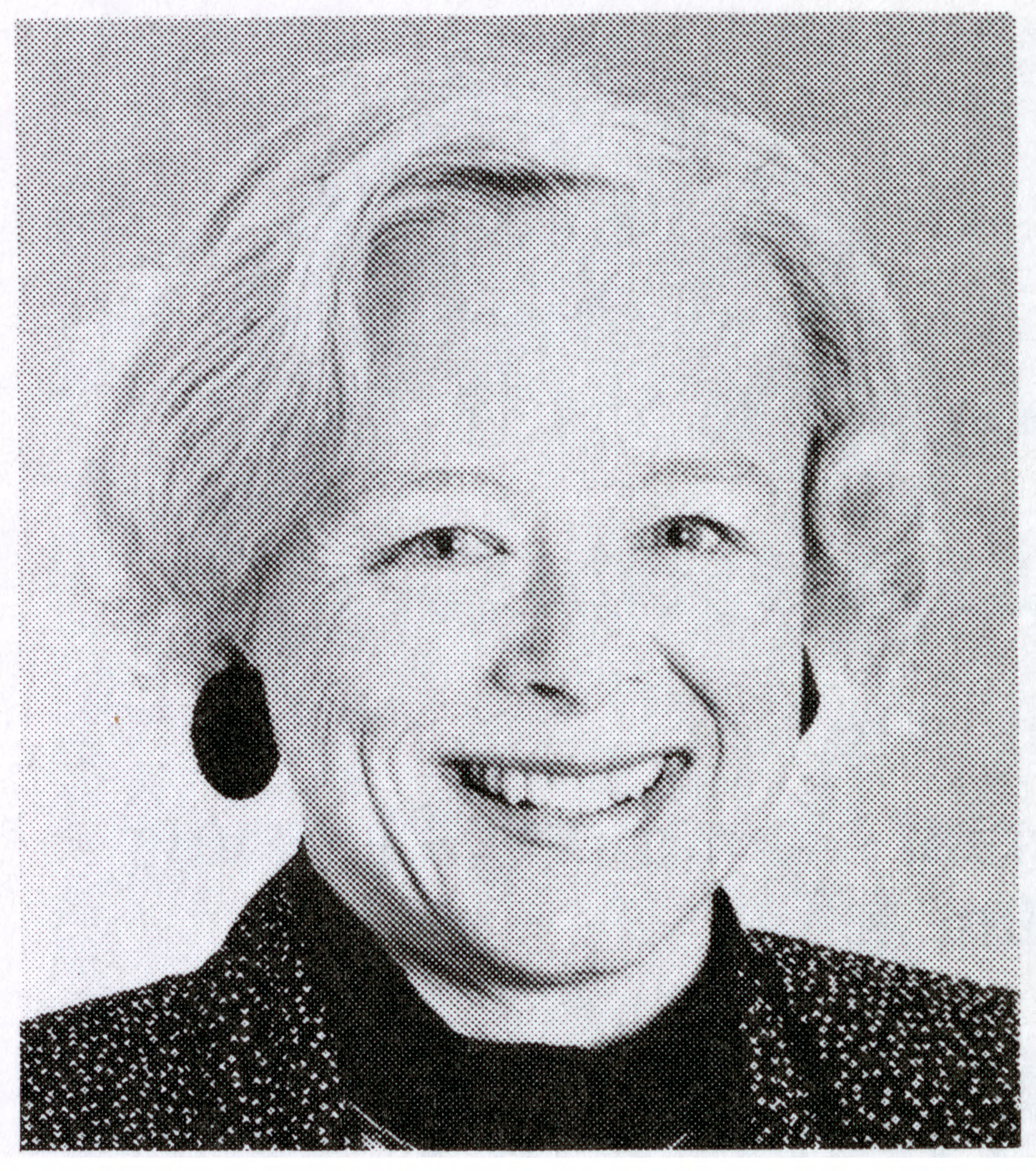

Member of the Minnesota House of Representatives
- In office January 4, 1983 – January 2, 1995
- Preceded by: Tad Jude
- Succeeded by: Erik Paulsen
- Constituency: 42A (1983-1993); 42B (1993-1994)

Personal details
- Born: Sidney Lee Johnson; July 23, 1933 (age 93)
- Party: Republican
- Spouse: Roger Pauly
- Children: 4
- Education: University of Minnesota

Sidney Johnson Pauly (born July 23, 1933) is an American politician in the state of Minnesota. She served in the Minnesota House of Representatives. She has nine grandchildren and four great grandchildren.
