= Howard Orenstein =

American lawyer

Howard R. Orenstein (born November 11, 1955) was an American politician and lawyer.

Orenstein was born in St. Louis, Missouri. He received his bachelor's degree in political science from Vanderbilt University in 1978 and his Juris Doctor degree from Northwestern University Pritzker School of Law in 1982. Orenstein lived with his wife and family in Saint Paul, Minnesota. He practiced law in Saint Paul, Minnesota and was an assistant county attorney for Hennepin County, Minnesota. Orenstein served in the Minnesota House of Representatives from 1987 to 1996 and was a Democrat.
