= Edgar Olson =

American politician (1937–2020)

Member of the Minnesota House of Representatives from the 2B district
- In office 1985–1998

Personal details
- Born: October 19, 1937 Fosston, Minnesota, U.S.
- Died: August 20, 2020 (aged 82) Madison, Minnesota U.S.
- Party: Democratic (DFL)
- Spouse: Phyllis
- Children: 2
- Education: North Dakota State University
- Occupation: farmer

Edgar Laverne Olson (October 19, 1937 – August 20, 2020) was an American politician in the state of Minnesota. He served in the Minnesota House of Representatives. Olson died on August 20, 2020, at Madison Health Hospital in Madison, Minnesota.
