= Kathleen Vellenga =

American politician

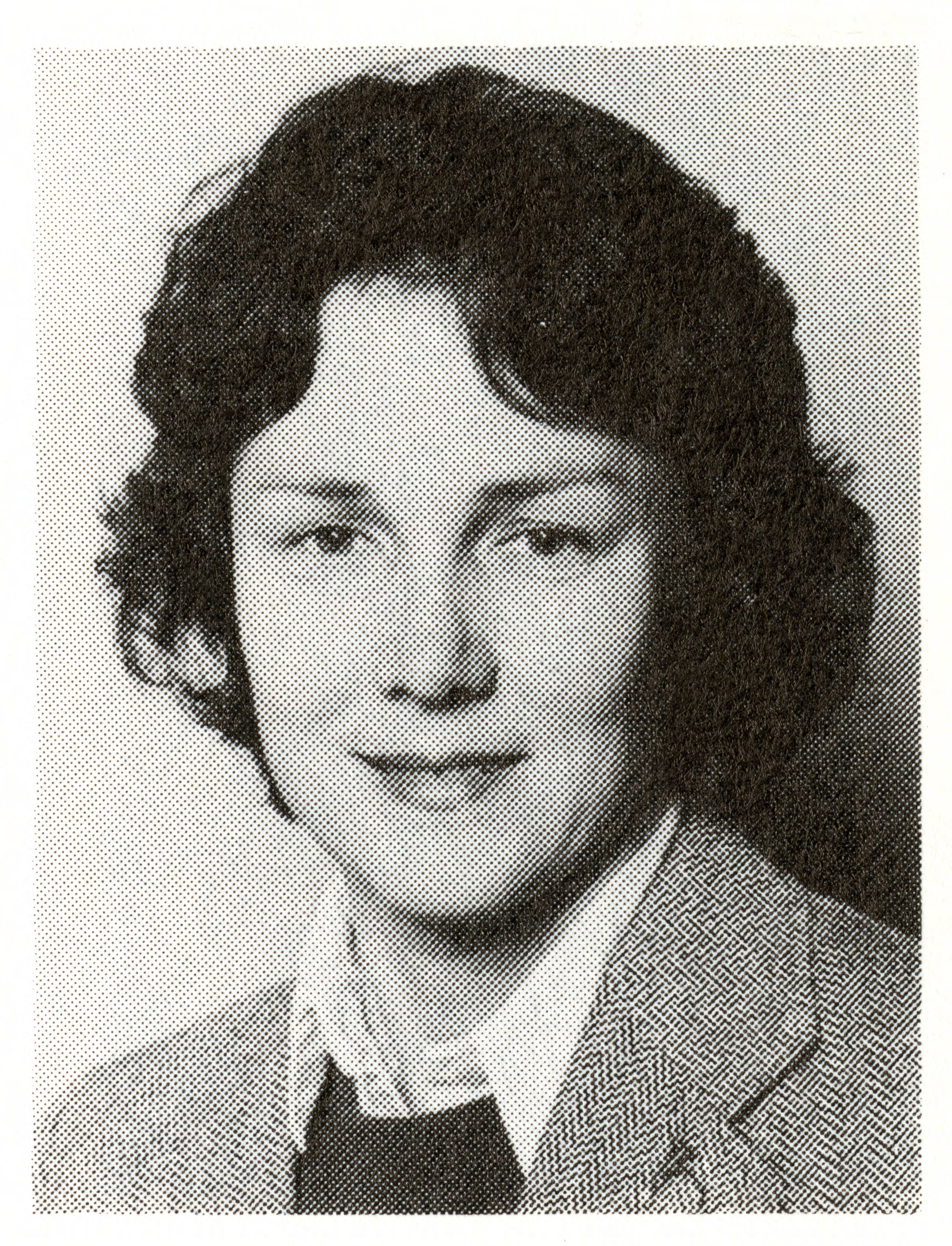

Kathleen A. Osborne Vellenga (born August 5, 1938) is an American politician and novelist.

Vellenga was born in Nebraska. She went to South Dakota State University and received her bachelor's degree in education from Macalester College. Vellenga lived in Saint Paul, Minnesota with her husband and three children, and was an early childhood educator. She served in the Minnesota House of Representatives from 1981 to 1994 and was a Democrat. After she stepped down from the legislature, she served as the executive director of the St. Paul Children's Initiative.

In 2013, she published her first novel Strangers in Our Midst, a work of historical fiction about the friendship between an English passenger on the Mayflower and a Wampanoag woman living on the land that the English soon came to occupy.

The sequel, In the Midst of Bounty, came out in 2016, and the third book in the series, Tides of the Kennebec, was published in 2021.
