= Sylvester Uphus =

American farmer and politician

Member of the Minnesota House of Representatives from the 15A district
- In office 1983-1993

Personal details
- Born: Sylvester Bernard Uphus; December 29, 1927 Grove Township, Stearns County, Minnesota
- Died: January 1, 2017 (aged 89) Sauk Centre, Minnesota, U.S.
- Party: Independent Republican
- Spouse: Rose Uphus
- Children: 12
- Education: College of Saint Benedict and Saint John's University
- Occupation: Farmer

Sylvester Bernard Uphus (December 29, 1927 – January 1, 2017) was an American farmer and politician.

Born on a farm near Greenwald, Minnesota, Uphus served in the United States Navy during World War II. He went to the College of Saint Benedict and Saint John's University after which he became a farmer. He served on the Ashley Township board. He served in the Minnesota House of Representatives from 1983–92 as an Independent Republican. He lived in Sauk Centre, Minnesota. A nephew was Steve Dehler, who also served in the Minnesota Legislature. Uphus died in Sauk Centre, three days after his 89th birthday.
