= Dean Hartle =

American businessman, farmer, and politician (1931–2018)

Dean Pickett Hartle (July 19, 1931 – November 12, 2018) was an American businessman, farmer, and politician.

== Background ==
Hartle was born in Owatonna, Minnesota. He went to Owatonna High School. He went to the University of Minnesota and received his bachelor's degree from Hamline University. He studied farm management and agricultural economics. Hartle was involved in the insurance business and he co-owned the Havana Hill Golf and Driving Range. Hartle was also a farmer. He served in the Minnesota House of Representatives from 1985 to 1992 and was a Republican. His uncle John A. Hartle also served in the Minnesota Legislature. Hartle died at St. Mary's Hospital, at the Mayo Clinic in Rochester, Minnesota.
