= Gene Waldorf =

American politician (1936–2020)

Member of the Minnesota House of Representatives
- In office 1977–1980

Member of the Minnesota Senate
- In office 1981–1993

Personal details
- Born: February 25, 1936
- Died: February 29, 2020 (aged 84)
- Party: Democratic
- Education: University of Minnesota

Military service
- Branch/service: United States Army

Eugene Thomas "Gene" Waldorf (February 25, 1936 – February 29, 2020) was an American electrical engineer and politician.

== Biography ==
Waldorf was born in St. Cloud, Minnesota. He graduated from Cathedral High School in St. Cloud. Waldorf served in the United States Army. Waldorf received his bachelor's degree from the University of Minnesota. He lived with his wife and family in Saint Paul, Minnesota and worked as an electrical engineer for the 3M Company. Waldorf served in the Minnesota House of Representatives from 1977 to 1980 and in the Minnesota Senate from 1981 to 1993. He was a Democrat. In 2010, Waldorf ran as an independent for the United States House of Representatives.
