= Brad Stanius =

American politician

Brad G. Stanius (March 14, 1946 – October 7, 2014) was an American pharmacist and politician.

From White Bear Lake, Minnesota, Stanius received his bachelor's degree from the University of Minnesota School of Pharmacy. He was a pharmacist. He served on the White Bear Lake City Council and was mayor of the city. From 1985 to 1994, Stanius served in the Minnesota House of Representatives. He was a Republican.
