= Mel Frederick =

American politician and businessman (1929–2019)

Melvin Lyle Frederick (November 24, 1929 – August 19, 2019) was an American politician and businessman.

Frederick was born in West Concord, Minnesota. He graduated from the West Concord High School in 1947. Frederick then served in the United States Army during the Korean War. He was involved in the grocery business and was the owner of Fredeick's Super Valu in West Concord. Frederick was also a stock broker. Frederick served in the Minnesota Senate from 1971 to 1990 and was a Republican. Frederick died from cancer at St. Mary's Hospital in Rochester, Minnesota.
