= John Brandl =

American politician

Dean of the Hubert H. Humphrey School of Public Affairs
- In office 1997–2002

Member of the Minnesota Senate from the 62nd district
- In office 1987–1990

Member of the Minnesota House of Representatives from the 62B district 61A (1977-78 and 1981-82)
- In office 1981–1986

Personal details
- Born: August 19, 1937 St. Cloud, Minnesota, U.S.
- Died: August 18, 2008 (aged 70)
- Party: Democratic (DFL)
- Education: Cathedral High School; St. John's University; Harvard University (PhD)

John Brandl (August 19, 1937 – August 18, 2008) was a Minnesota economist, state legislator and dean of the Hubert H. Humphrey School of Public Affairs at the University of Minnesota. He also served as Deputy Assistant Secretary of the Department of Health, Education and Welfare during the Johnson Administration.

Born in St. Cloud, Minnesota, he graduated from Cathedral High School in 1955. He earned an undergraduate degree in economics from St. John's University in Collegeville, Minnesota in 1959, followed by a master's degree and Ph.D. in economics from Harvard University in 1963. In 1968, he returned to Minnesota to become assistant professor at the School of Public Affairs at the University of Minnesota. He rose to be Associate Professor and its director. The school later became part of the Hubert H. Humphrey School of Public Affairs, where he was dean from 1997 to 2002.

From 1977 to 1978 and from 1981 to 1986, he was a member of the Minnesota House of Representatives for south Minneapolis; subsequently, he won a seat in the Minnesota Senate, where he served until 1990.

Brandl received the Fordham Foundation Prize for Academic Excellence and the Governors Association Award for Distinguished Service to State Government. He served as regent of St. John's University and as president of the Citizens League of the Twin Cities.
