= Joyce Henry =

American politician and educator

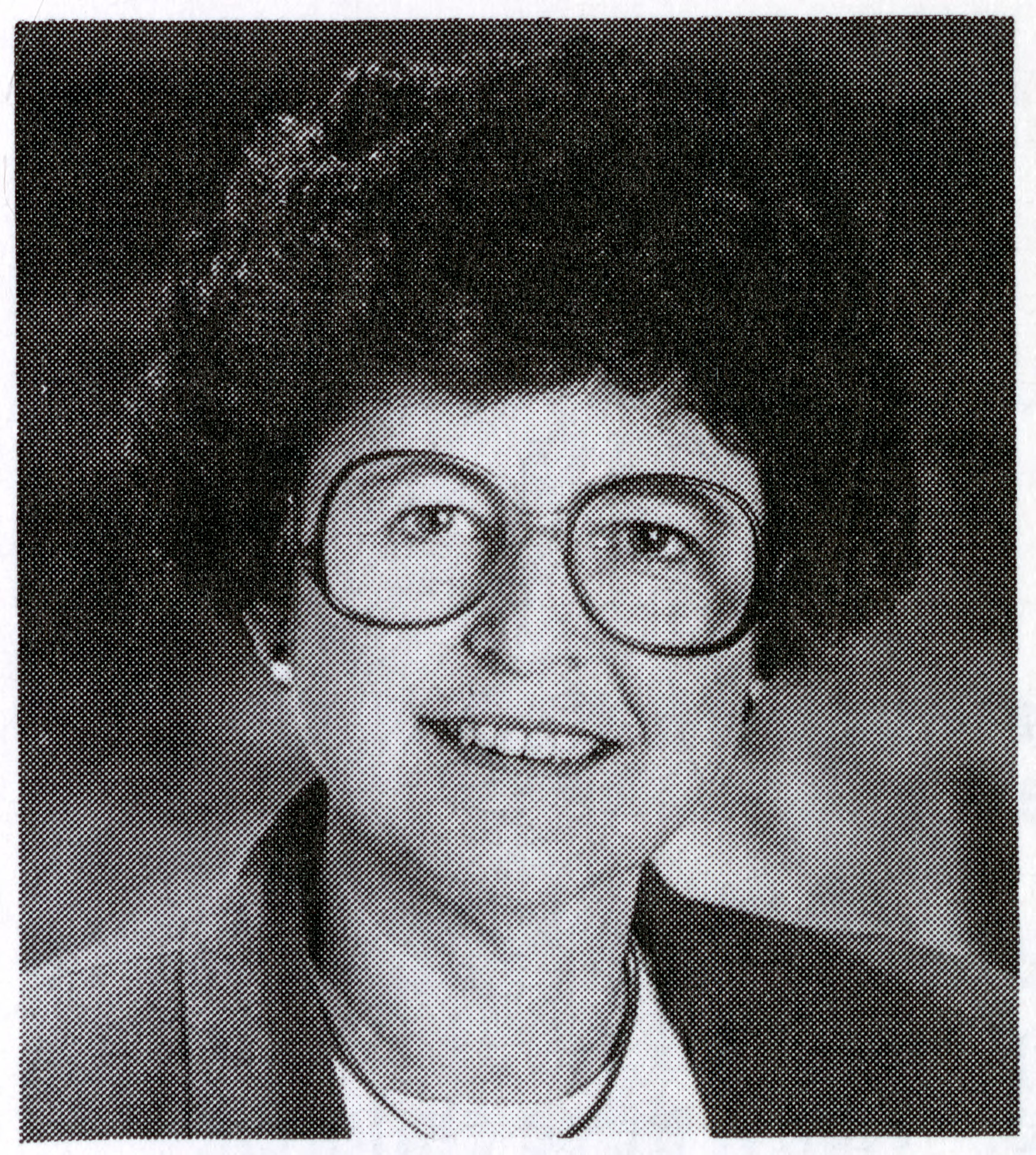

Joyce Henry was an American politician and educator.

Henry lived in Bloomington, Minnesota with her husband and family. She received her bachelor's degree in music from Northwestern College. Henry was an office manager and homemaker. She served in the Minnesota House of Representatives from 1989 to 1992 and was a Republican. Mark P. Mahon defeated Henry in the 1992 election.
