= Elton Redalen =

American farmer and politician

Member of the Minnesota House of Representatives
- In office 1977–1991

Elton Redalen (March 5, 1926 – July 10, 2009) was an American farmer and politician.

Born near Fountain, Minnesota, Redalen served in the United States Navy during World War II. He went to Miami University and the University of Minnesota. Redalen was a dairy farmer. He served in the Minnesota House of Representatives as a Republican from 1977 until 1991. He then resigned and served as Commissioner of the Minnesota Department of Agriculture from 1991 until his retirement in 1995. Redalen died in Chatfield, Minnesota.
