= Nancy Brataas =

American politician

- Born: Nancy Osborn; January 19, 1928; Minneapolis
- Died: April 17, 2014 (aged 86)
- Occupation: Politician

Nancy Osborn Brataas (January 19, 1928 – April 17, 2014) was an American politician and consultant. She served in the Minnesota Senate from 1975 to 1992.

Born in Minneapolis, Minnesota, Brataas went to the University of Minnesota, where she joined the sorority Alpha Phi. She was a management and data processing consultant for charities and political organizations and the owner of Nancy Brataas Associates. Brataas lived in Rochester, Minnesota. Brataas served from 1975 to 1992 in the Minnesota State Senate as a Republican. She was the first woman to be elected in her own right.

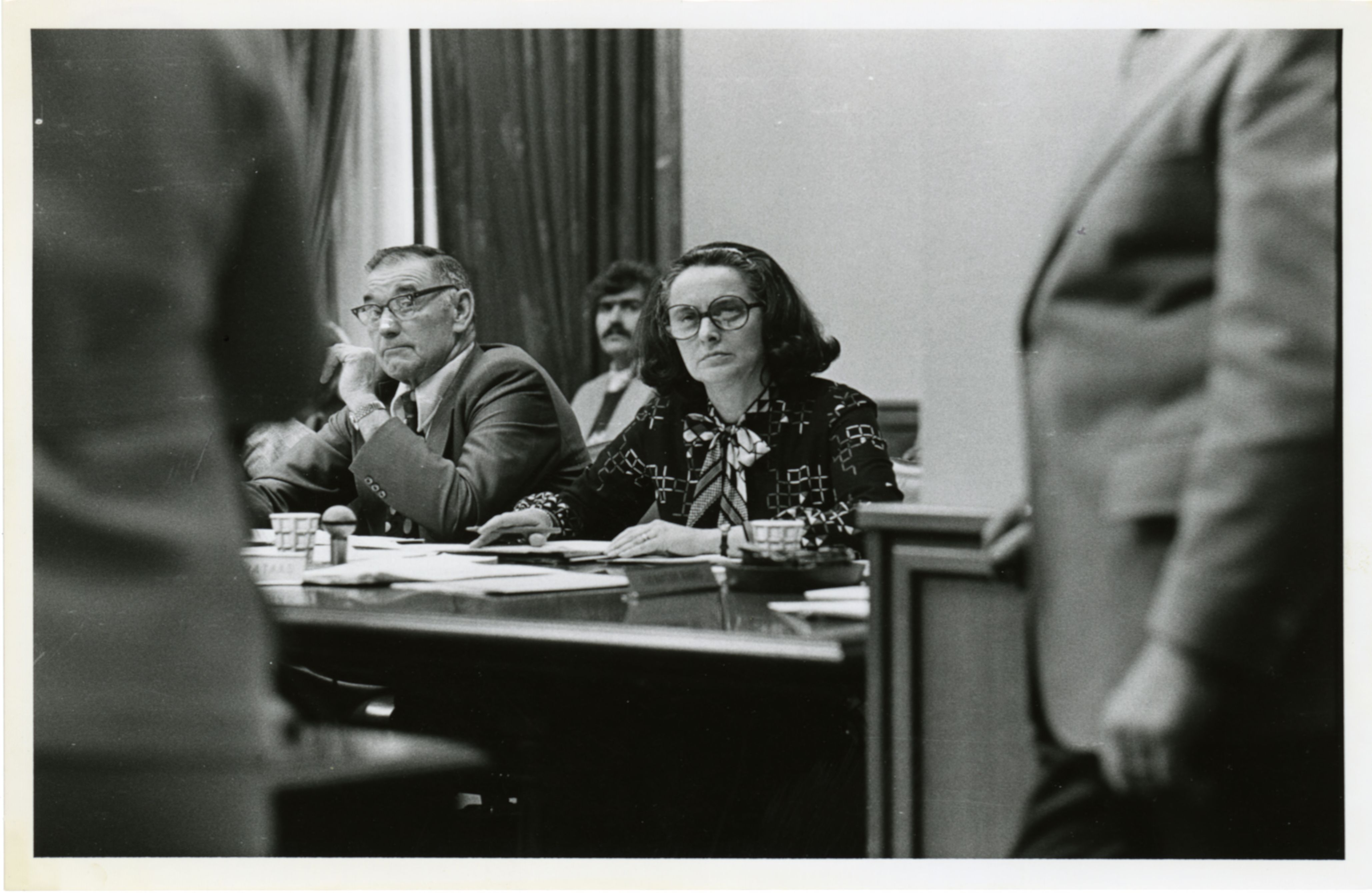
Senator Llewellyn Larson and Senator Nancy Brataas listening during a committee hearing, St. Paul, Minnesota.
