= Ron Dicklich =

American politician

Ronald R. "Ron" Dicklich (born June 14, 1951) is an American politician and a construction worker.

Dicklich lived in Hibbing, Minnesota with his wife and family. He received his bachelor's degree in history and political science from the University of Minnesota. Dicklich was a staff member for Minnesota State Representative Tony Sertich and worked for the Minnesota Department of Employment and Economic Development. He served on the St. Louis County Commission and was a Democrat. Dicklich served in the Minnesota Senate from 1981 to 1992.
