= Bob Johnson (Minnesota politician) =

American politician, farmer, and school social worker

Robert A. Johnson (December 1, 1945 – June 20, 2017) was an American politician, farmer, and school social worker.

Johnson was born in Minneapolis, Minnesota. He received his bachelor's degree in psychology and social work from Bemidji State University, Bemidji, Minnesota. He lived in Bemidji, Minnesota and was a school social worker. Johnson was also a game bird farmer. Johnson served in the Minnesota House of Representatives from 1987 to 1997 and was a Democrat. Johnson died in Woodbury, Minnesota.
