= Leonard Price =

American politician

Member of the Minnesota Senate from the 57th district
- In office 1993–2002

Member of the Minnesota Senate from the 56th district
- In office 1991–1992

Member of the Minnesota House of Representatives from the 56A district
- In office 1983–1990

Personal details
- Born: September 21, 1942 (age 84)
- Party: Minnesota Democratic–Farmer–Labor Party
- Spouse: Stephanie Wright
- Children: three
- Education: University of Wisconsin–River Falls, University of Minnesota
- Occupation: teacher

Leonard Russell Price (born September 21, 1942) is an American politician in the state of Minnesota. He served in the Minnesota House of Representatives and the Minnesota State Senate.

His career before serving in the Minnesota legislature was a Social Studies teacher at Woodbury High School in Woodbury, Minnesota.
