= Bob Milbert =

American politician

Member of the Minnesota House of Representatives from the 39B district
- In office 1987–2002

Personal details
- Born: June 21, 1949 (age 77) Ramsey County, Minnesota, U.S.
- Party: Minnesota Democratic–Farmer–Labor Party
- Spouse: Vicky
- Children: three
- Education: Dartmouth College
- Occupation: businessman

Robert Patrick Milbert (born June 21, 1949) is an American politician in the state of Minnesota. He served in the Minnesota House of Representatives.
