= James C. Heap =

American politician

James C. "Jim" Heap (February 17, 1935 – December 23, 2013) was an American businessman and politician.

Born in New York City, Heap served in the United States Navy and then received his bachelor's degree in economics from Providence College. He also went to Boston University, and University of Notre Dame. Heap worked at Pillsbury Company, was a sales and market instructor at Hennepin Technical College and later was a business consultant. He lived in Robbinsdale, Minnesota. From 1979 until 1991, Heap served in the Minnesota House of Representatives and was a Republican.
