= Kenneth J. Kludt =

American lawyer

Kenneth J. Kludt (born January 13, 1949) was an American politician and lawyer.

Kludt lived in Moorhead, Minnesota with his wife and family. He received his bachelor's degree in English from the University of North Dakota and his Juris Doctor degree from the Hamline University School of Law. Kludt was admitted to the Minnesota bar. Kludt served in the Minnesota House of Representatives in 1987 and 1988 and was a Democrat.
