= Phyllis W. McQuaid =

American politician (1928–2023)

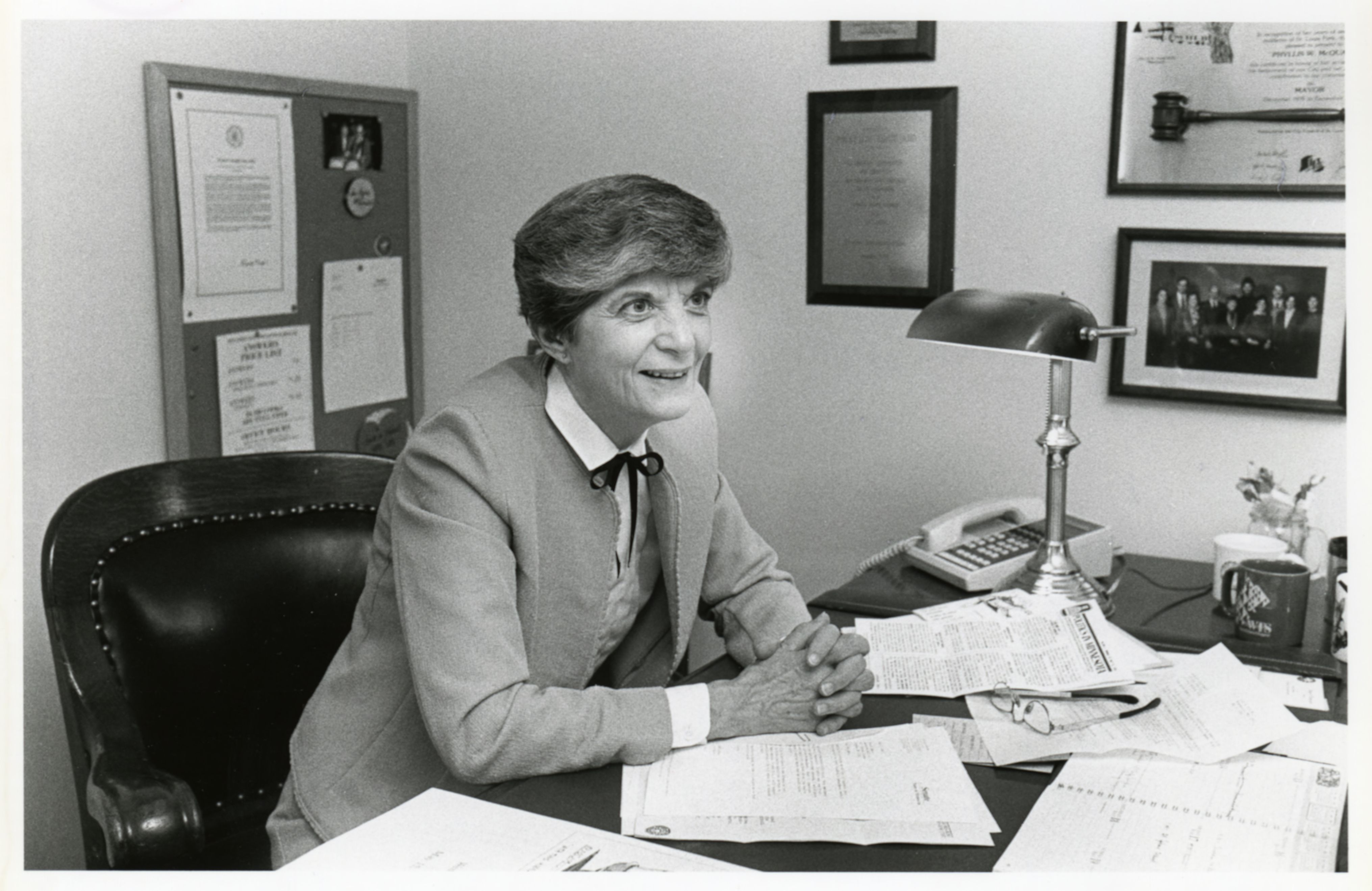

Member of the Minnesota Senate from the 44th district
- In office 1983–1990

Mayor of St. Louis Park, Minnesota
- In office 1978–1982

Personal details
- Born: Phyllis Winifred Haas; March 6, 1928 Frazee, Minnesota, U.S.
- Died: June 7, 2023 (aged 95) Roseville, Minnesota, U.S.
- Party: Independent Republican
- Spouse: Joseph McQuaid
- Children: 8

Phyllis Winifred McQuaid (née Haas; March 6, 1928 – June 7, 2023) was an American politician in the state of Minnesota.

After raising eight children as a stay-at-home mother, McQuaid was elected in 1975 to the St. Louis Park School Board and in 1979 as mayor of St. Louis Park.

McQuaid served in the Minnesota Senate as an Independent Republican member, representing district 44 from 1983 to 1990, when she lost re-election to Ted Mondale. She died in Roseville, Minnesota, in 2023, at the age of 95.

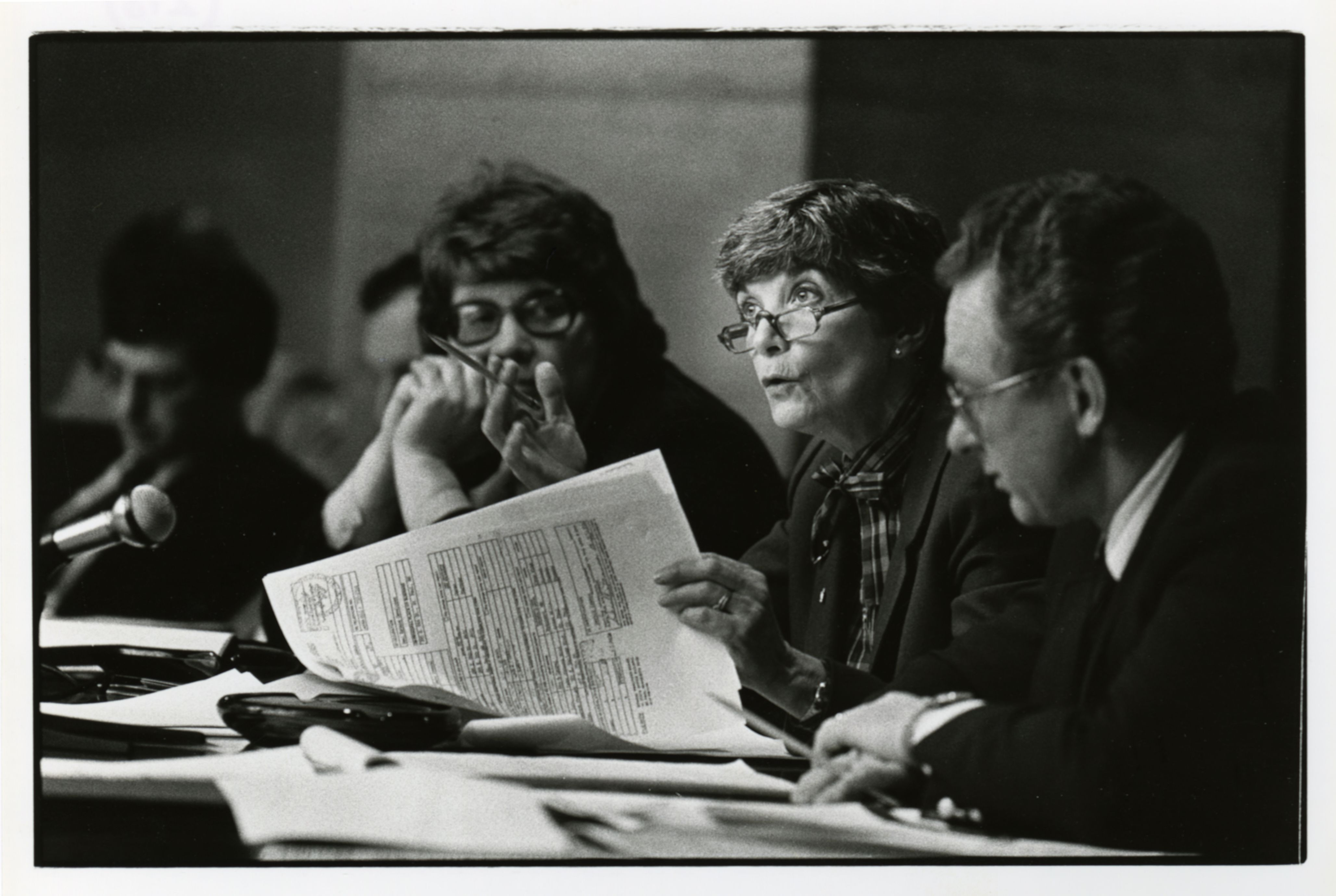
Senator Phyllis McQuaid speaks during a committee hearing, St. Paul, Minnesota.
