= Lyle Mehrkens =

American politician and farmer

Lyle George Mehrkens (November 7, 1937 – January 21, 2018) was an American politician and farmer.

Mehrkens was born in Featherstone Township, Goodhue County, Minnesota. He graduated from Red Wing High School in Red Wing, Minnesota in 1956. Mehrkens then graduated from the University of Minnesota School of Agriculture in 1958. He served in the Minnesota National Guard. He lived in Red Wing, Minnesota and was a farmer. Mehrkens served in the Minnesota House of Representatives from 1979 to 1982. He then served in the Minnesota Senate from 1983 to 1992. Mehrkens was a Republican. Mehrkens died at his home in Red Wing, Minnesota.
