= Darril Wegscheid =

American politician (born 1944)

Darril Wegscheid (born July 14, 1944) is an American politician and businessman.

Wegscheid lived with his wife and family in Apple Valley, Minnesota. He received his bachelor's degree from the University of St. Thomas, in 1966 and his master's degree from the University of Pennsylvania in 1968. Wegscheid worked for 3M and was a manager for the informational system. He served on the Rosemount-Apple Valley School Board and was a Democrat. Wegscheid served in the Minnesota Senate from 1983 to 1989.
