= Dave Gruenes =

American educator, businessman and politician

David B. Gruenes (born January 6, 1958) was an American educator, businessman, and politician.

Gruenes lived in St. Cloud, Minnesota. He lived in St. Cloud, Minnesota with his wife and family. Gruenes graduated from Cathedral High School in St. Cloud, Minnesota. He then graduated from College of Saint Benedict and Saint John's University in Collegeville, Minnesota. Gruenes was an educator and was involved in the banking and loan business. Gruenes served in the Minnesota House of Representatives from 1981 to 1994 and was a Republican. He then served on the Minnesota Department of Commerce as a commissioner from 1995 to 1999.
