= Bob Decker =

American politician (1922–1999)

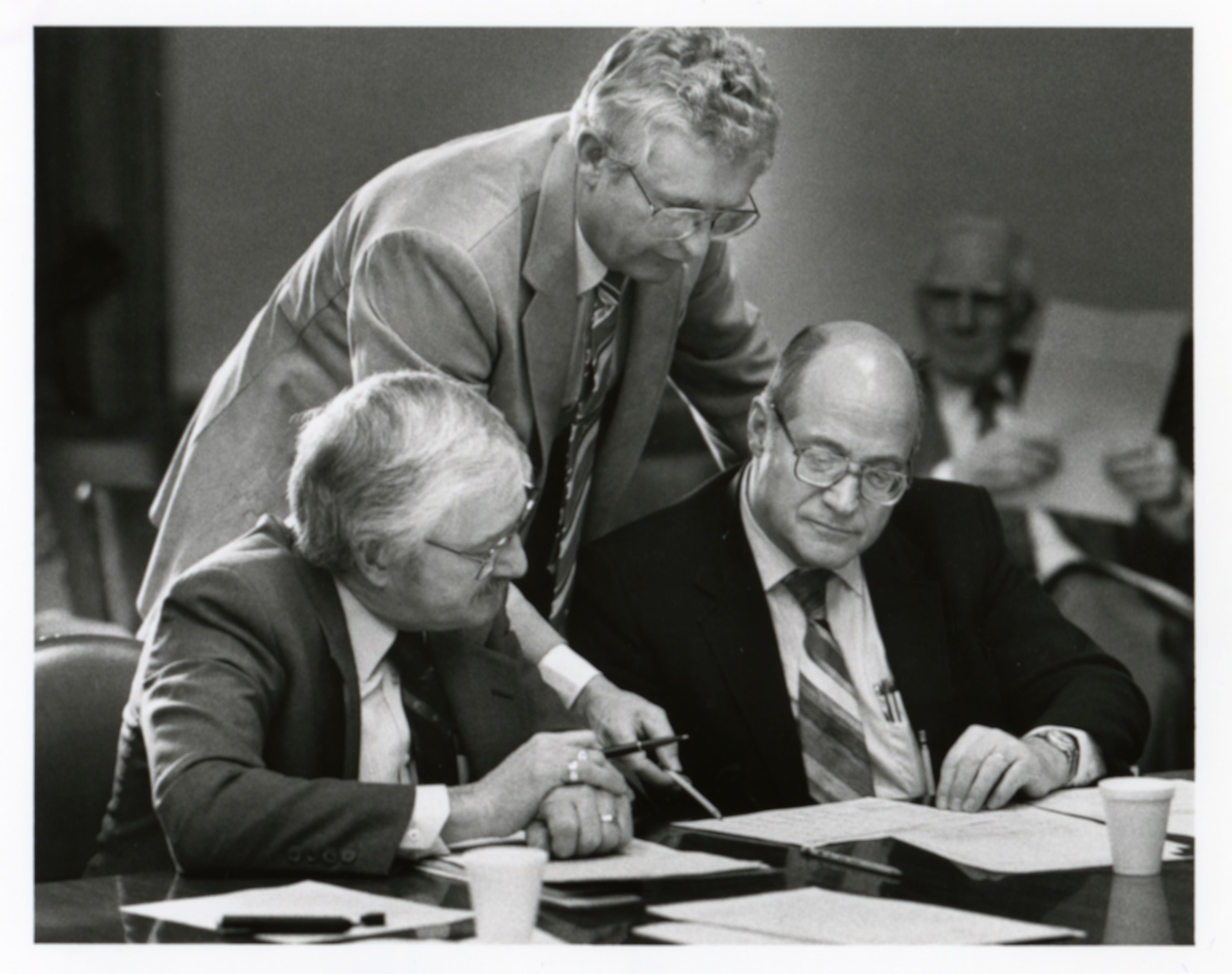
- Decker (right) with Jim Vickerman (left) and Don A. Anderson (standing)

Member of the Minnesota Senate
- In office November 16, 1987 – January 6, 1991
- Governor: Rudy Perpich

President of Bemidji State University
- In office 1968–1980

Personal details
- Born: November 11, 1922 Wimberley, Texas, U.S.
- Died: October 19, 1999 (aged 76) Ventura, California, U.S.
- Education: Texas A&M University

Military service
- Allegiance: United States
- Branch/service: United States Army
- Rank: Lieutenant Colonel
- Battles/wars: World War II

Robert "Bob" David Decker (November 11, 1922 – October 19, 1999) was an American politician and educator.

Decker was born in Wimberley, Hays County, Texas. He went to Southwest Texas State College (now Texas State University). Decker received his bachelor's, master's and doctorate degrees from Texas A&M College of Agriculture and Life Sciences. Decker also served in the United States Army. He also serve on a school board in Texas. Decker moved to Bemidji, Minnesota, in 1968, with his wife and family and taught at Bemidji State University. He also served as the President of Bemidji State University. Decker served in the Minnesota Senate from 1987 to 1990 and was a Republican. In 1996, he moved to Ventura, California with his wife. He died from Alzheimer's disease in Ventura, California.
