= 77th Minnesota Legislature =

1991–1993 Minnesota Legislature

Seventy-seventh Minnesota Legislature
←	76th Minnesota Legislature	78th Minnesota Legislature	→
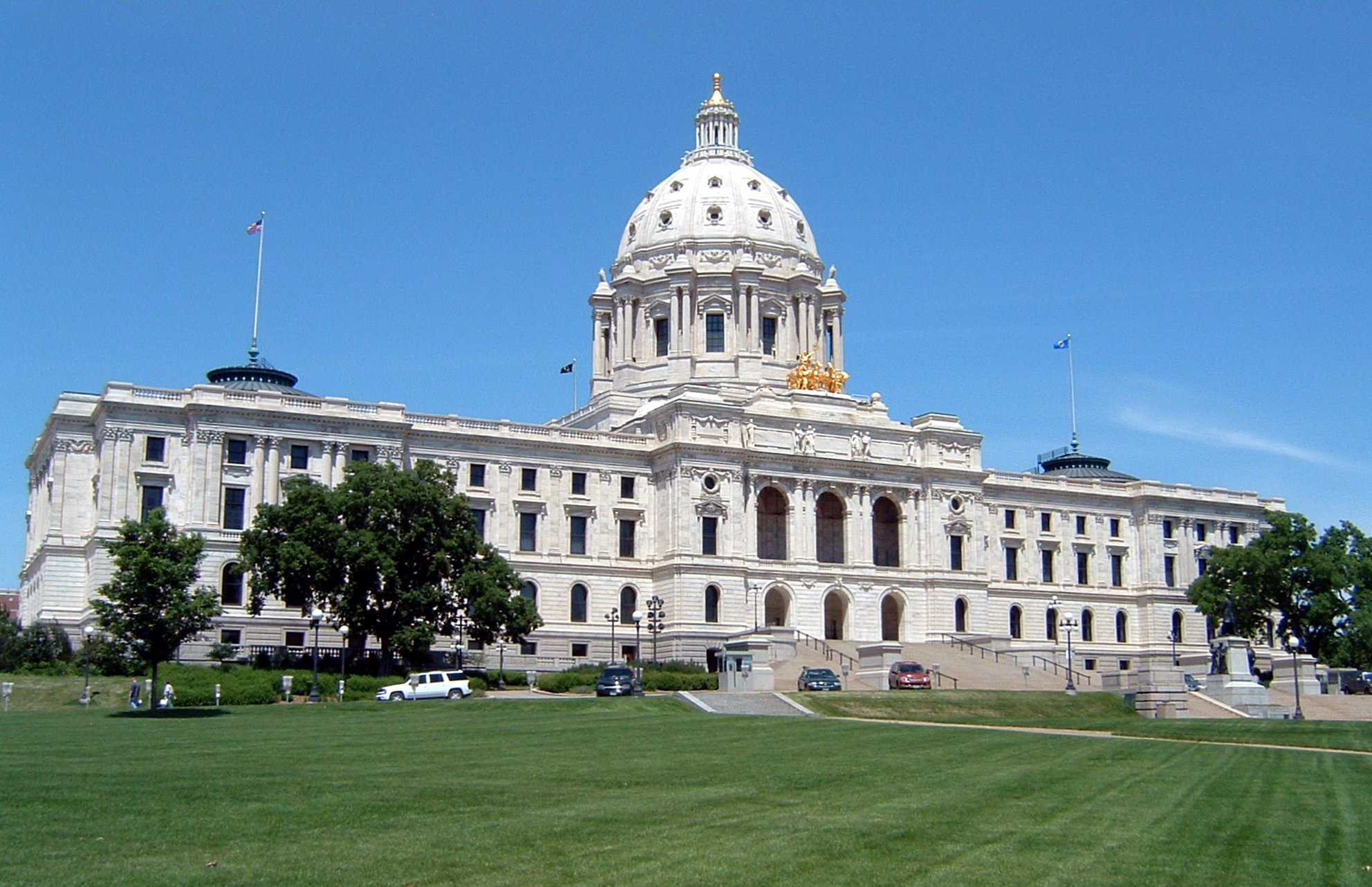

Overview
- Legislative body: Minnesota Legislature
- Jurisdiction: Minnesota, United States
- Meeting place: Minnesota State Capitol
- Term: January 8, 1991 – January 5, 1993
- Website: www.leg.state.mn.us

Minnesota State Senate
- Members: 67 Senators
- President: Jerome M. Hughes
- Majority Leader: Roger Moe
- Minority Leader: Duane Benson
- Party control: Democratic-Farmer-Labor Party

Minnesota House of Representatives
- Members: 134 Representatives
- Speaker: Robert Vanasek, Dee Long
- Majority Leader: Dee Long, Alan Welle
- Minority Leader: Terry Dempsey
- Party control: Democratic-Farmer-Labor Party

The seventy-seventh Minnesota Legislature first convened on January 8, 1991. The 67 members of the Minnesota Senate and the 134 members of the Minnesota House of Representatives were elected during the General Election of November 6, 1990.

== Sessions ==
The legislature met in a regular session from January 8, 1991, to May 20, 1991. A continuation of the regular session was held between January 6, 1992, and April 16, 1992. There were no special sessions of the seventy-seventh Legislature.

== Party summary ==
Resignations and new members are discussed in the "Membership changes" section, below.

=== Senate ===
	Party (Shading indicates majority caucus)		Total	Vacant
	DFL	IR	Total	Vacant
End of previous Legislature	44	23	67	0
Begin	46	21	67	0
December 7, 1991	46	20	66	1
January 9, 1992	46	21	67	0
May 20, 1992	46	20	66	1
Latest voting share	69%	30%		
Beginning of the next Legislature	45	22	67	0

=== House of Representatives ===
	Party (Shading indicates majority caucus)		Total	Vacant
	DFL	IR	Total	Vacant
End of previous Legislature	78	52	130	4
Begin	79	53	132	2
February 7, 1991	79	54	133	1
February 18, 1991	79	55	134	0
November 1, 1991	78	55	133	1
January 2, 1992	78	56	134	0
May 7, 1992	78	55	133	1
May 11, 1992	78	54	132	2
July, 1992	79 (Note: Previously an Independent Republican, Bob Anderson joined the DFL in July 1992.)	53	132	2
December 14, 1992	78	53	131	3
Latest voting share	58%	40%		
Beginning of the next Legislature	86	47	133	1

== Leadership ==
=== Senate ===
President of the Senate
Jerome M. Hughes (DFL-Maplewood)

Senate Majority Leader
Roger Moe (DFL-Erskine)

Senate Minority Leader
Duane Benson (IR-Lanesboro)

=== House of Representatives ===
Speaker of the House (Note: Dee Long acted as Speaker-Designate from August 11, 1991, until she became Speaker in her own right on January 6, 1992.)
Until January 6, 1992 Robert Vanasek (DFL-New Prague)
After January 6, 1992 Dee Long (DFL-Minneapolis)

House Majority Leader
Until July 11, 1991 Dee Long (DFL-Minneapolis)
After July 11, 1991 Alan Welle (DFL-Willmar)

House Minority Leader
Terry Dempsey (IR-New Ulm)

== Members ==
=== Senate ===
Name	District	City	Party
Adkins, Betty	22	St. Michael	DFL
Beckman, Tracy	26	Bricelyn	DFL
Belanger, William	41	Bloomington	IR
Benson, Duane	32	Lanesboro	IR
Benson, Joanne	17	St. Cloud	IR
Berg, Charlie	11	Chokio	DFL
Berglin, Linda	60	Minneapolis	DFL
Bernhagen, John	21	Hutchinson	IR
Bertram, Joe	16	Paynesville	DFL
Brataas, Nancy	33	Rochester	IR
Chmielewski, Florian	14	Sturgeon Lake	DFL
Cohen, Dick	64	St. Paul	DFL
Dahl, Gregory	50	Ham Lake	DFL
Davis, Chuck	18	Princeton	DFL
Day, Dick	30	Owatonna	IR
DeCramer, Gary	27	Ghent	DFL
Dicklich, Ron	05	Hibbing	DFL
Finn, Skip	04	Cass Lake	DFL
Flynn, Carol	61	Minneapolis	DFL
Frank, Don	51	Spring Lake Park	DFL
Frederickson, Dave	20	Murdock	DFL
Frederickson, Dennis	23	New Ulm	IR
Gustafson, Jim	08	Duluth	IR
Halberg, Chuck	38	Burnsville	IR
Hottinger, John	24	Mankato	DFL
Hughes, Jerome M.	54	Maplewood	DFL
Johnson, Dean	15	Willmar	IR
Johnson, Doug	06	Tower	DFL
Johnson, Janet	19	North Branch	DFL
Johnston, Terry	36	Prior Lake	IR
Kelly, Randy	67	St. Paul	DFL
Knaak, Fritz	53	White Bear Lake	IR
Kroening, Carl	57	Minneapolis	DFL
Laidig, Gary	55	Stillwater	IR
Langseth, Keith	09	Glyndon	DFL
Larson, Cal	10	Fergus Falls	IR
Lessard, Bob	03	International Falls	DFL
Luther, Bill	47	Brooklyn Park	DFL
Marty, John	63	Roseville	DFL
McGowan, Pat	33	Maple Grove	IR
Mehrkens, Lyle	26	Red Wing	IR
Merriam, Gene	49	Coon Rapids	DFL
Metzen, James	39	South St. Paul	DFL
Moe, Roger	02	Erskine	DFL
Mondale, Ted	44	Saint Louis Park	DFL
Morse, Steven	34	Dakota	DFL
Neuville, Thomas	25	Northfield	IR
Novak, Steve	52	New Brighton	DFL
Olson, Gen	43	Minnetrista	IR
Pappas, Sandra	65	St. Paul	DFL
Pariseau, Pat	37	Farmington	IR
Piper, Pat	31	Austin	DFL
Pogemiller, Larry	58	Minneapolis	DFL
Price, Leonard	56	Woodbury	DFL
Ranum, Jane	62	Minneapolis	DFL
Reichgott Junge, Ember	46	New Hope	DFL
Renneke, Earl	35	Le Sueur	IR
Riveness, Phil	40	Bloomington	DFL
Sams, Dallas	12	Staples	DFL
Samuelson, Don	13	Brainerd	DFL
Solon, Sam	07	Duluth	DFL
Spear, Allan	59	Minneapolis	DFL
Storm, Don	42	Edina	IR
Stumpf, LeRoy	01	Thief River Falls	DFL
Terwilliger, Roy	42	Edina	IR
Traub, Judy	45	Minnetonka	DFL
Vickerman, Jim	28	Tracy	DFL
Waldorf, Gene	66	St. Paul	DFL

=== House of Representatives ===
Name	District	City	Party
Abrams, Ron	45A	Minnetonka	IR
Anderson, Richard H.	30B	Waseca	IR
Anderson, Bob	10B	Ottertail	DFL
Anderson, Irv	03A	International Falls	DFL
Battaglia, David Peter	06A	Two Harbors	DFL
Bauerly, Jerry	18B	Sauk Rapids	DFL
Beard, Pat	56B	Cottage Grove	DFL
Begich, Joseph	06B	Eveleth	DFL
Bertram, Jeff	16B	Paynesville	DFL
Bettermann, Hilda	11B	Brandon	IR
Bishop, Dave	33B	Rochester	IR
Blatz, Kathleen	41B	Bloomington	IR
Bodahl, Larry	35B	Waconia	DFL
Boo, Ben	08B	Duluth	IR
Brown, Chuck	11A	Appleton	DFL
Carlson, Lyndon	46B	Crystal	DFL
Carruthers, Phil	47B	Brooklyn Center	DFL
Clark, Karen	60A	Minneapolis	DFL
Cooper, Roger	21B	Bird Island	DFL
Dauner, Marvin	09B	Hawley	DFL
Davids, Gregory	32B	Preston	IR
Dawkins, Andy	65A	St. Paul	DFL
Dempsey, Terry	23A	New Ulm	IR
Dille, Steve	21A	Dassel	IR
Dorn, John	24A	Mankato	DFL
Erhardt, Ron	42B	Edina	IR
Farrell, Jim	67A	St. Paul	DFL
Frederick, Sal	24B	Mankato	IR
Frerichs, Don	32A	Rochester	IR
Garcia, Edwina	40A	Richfield	DFL
Girard, Jim	27A	Lynd	IR
Goodno, Kevin	09A	Moorhead	IR
Greenfield, Lee	61A	Minneapolis	DFL
Gruenes, Dave	17B	St. Cloud	IR
Gutknecht, Gil	33A	Rochester	IR
Hanson, Jeff	56A	Woodbury	DFL
Hartle, Dean	30A	Owatonna	IR
Hasskamp, Kris	13A	Crosby	DFL
Haukoos, Bob	31A	Albert Lea	IR
Hausman, Alice	63B	St. Paul	DFL
Heir, Phil	50B	Blaine	IR
Henry, Joyce	40B	Bloomington	IR
Hufnagle, Paul	41A	Bloomington	IR
Hugoson, Gene	29A	Granada	IR
Jacobs, Joel	49B	Coon Rapids	DFL
Janezich, Jerry	05B	Chisholm	DFL
Jaros, Mike	07B	Duluth	DFL
Jefferson, Jeff	57B	Minneapolis	DFL
Jennings, Loren Geo	19B	Harris	DFL
Johnson, Alice	51A	Spring Lake Park	DFL
Johnson, Bob	04A	Bemidji	DFL
Johnson, Virgil	34A	Caledonia	IR
Kahn, Phyllis	58B	Minneapolis	DFL
Kalis, Henry	29B	Walters	DFL
Kelso, Becky	36A	Shakopee	DFL
Kinkel, Tony	04B	Park Rapids	DFL
Knickerbocker, Jerry	43B	Minnetonka	IR
Koppendrayer, LeRoy	18A	Princeton	IR
Krambeer, Rich	47A	Brooklyn Park	IR
Krinkie, Philip	53A	Shoreview	IR
Krueger, Rick	12B	Staples	DFL
Lasley, Harold	19A	Cambridge	DFL
Leppik, Peggy	45B	Golden Valley	IR
Lieder, Bernard	02A	Crookston	DFL
Limmer, Warren	48A	Maple Grove	IR
Long, Dee	59A	Minneapolis	DFL
Lourey, Becky	14B	Kerrick	DFL
Lynch, Teresa	50A	Andover	IR
Macklin, Bill	36B	Lakeville	IR
Mariani, Carlos	65B	St. Paul	DFL
Marsh, Marcus M.	17A	Sauk Rapids	IR
McEachern, Bob	22A	Maple Lake	DFL
McGuire, Mary Jo	63A	Falcon Heights	DFL
McPherson, Harriet	55B	Stillwater	IR
Milbert, Bob	39B	South St. Paul	DFL
Morrison, Connie	38A	Burnsville	IR
Munger, Willard	07A	Duluth	DFL
Murphy, Mary	08A	Hermantown	DFL
Nelson, Ken	62A	Minneapolis	DFL
Nelson, Syd	12A	Sebeka	DFL
Newinski, Dennis	54B	Maplewood	IR
O'Connor, Rich	66B	St. Paul	DFL
Ogren, Paul Anders	14A	Aitkin	DFL
Olsen, Sally	44A	Saint Louis Park	IR
Olson, Edgar	02B	Fosston	DFL
Olson, Katy	28B	Sherburn	DFL
Omann, Bernie	16A	St. Joseph	IR
Onnen, Tony	22B	Cokato	IR
Orenstein, Howard	64B	St. Paul	DFL
Orfield, Myron	59B	Minneapolis	DFL
Osthoff, Tom	66A	St. Paul	DFL
Ostrom, Don	23B	St. Peter	DFL
Ozment, Dennis	37B	Rosemount	IR
Pauly, Sidney	42A	Eden Prairie	IR
Pellow, Dick	52B	New Brighton	IR
Pelowski, Gene	34B	Winona	DFL
Petersen, Doug	20A	Madison	DFL
Pugh, Tom	39A	South St. Paul	DFL
Reding, Leo	31B	Austin	DFL
Rest, Ann	46A	New Hope	DFL
Rice, Jim	57A	Minneapolis	DFL
Rodosovich, Peter	25B	Faribault	DFL
Rukavina, Tom	05A	Virginia	DFL
Runbeck, Linda	52A	Circle Pines	IR
Sarna, John	58A	Minneapolis	DFL
Schafer, Gary	35A	Gibbon	IR
Scheid, Linda	47A	Brooklyn Park	DFL
Schreiber, Bill	48B	Brooklyn Park	IR
Seaberg, Art	38B	Eagan	IR
Segal, Gloria	44B	St. Louis Park	DFL
Simoneau, Wayne	51B	Fridley	DFL
Skoglund, Wes	61B	Minneapolis	DFL
Smith, Steve	43A	Mound	IR
Solberg, Loren	03B	Bovey	DFL
Sparby, Wally	01B	Thief River Falls	DFL
Stanius, Brad	53B	White Bear Lake	IR
Steensma, Andy	27B	Luverne	DFL
Sviggum, Steve	26A	Kenyon	IR
Swenson, Doug	55A	Forest Lake	IR
Thompson, Loren	10A	Waubun	DFL
Tompkins, Eileen	37A	Apple Valley	IR
Trimble, Steve	67B	St. Paul	DFL
Tunheim, Jim	01A	Kennedy	DFL
Uphus, Sylvester	15A	Sauk Centre	IR
Valento, Don	54A	Little Canada	IR
Vanasek, Robert	25A	New Prague	DFL
Vellenga, Kathleen	64A	St. Paul	DFL
Wagenius, Jean	62B	Minneapolis	DFL
Waltman, Bobby Joe	26B	Elgin	IR
Weaver, Charlie	49A	Anoka	IR
Wejcman, Linda	60B	Minneapolis	DFL
Welker, Ray	20B	Montevideo	IR
Welle, Alan	15B	Willmar	DFL
Wenzel, Steve	13B	Little Falls	DFL
Winter, Ted	28A	Fulda	DFL

== Membership changes ==
=== Senate ===
District	Vacated by	Reason for change	Successor	Date successor seated
42	Don Storm (IR)	Resigned December 7, 1991, to accept appointment to the Minnesota Public Utilities Commission.	Roy Terwilliger (IR)	January 9, 1992
08	Jim Gustafson (IR)	Resigned May 20, 1992, to accept appointment to the position of Commissioner of the Iron Range Resources and Rehabilitation Board.	Remained vacant	

=== House of Representatives ===
District	Vacated by	Reason for change	Successor	Date successor seated
32B	Elton Redalen (IR)	Resigned January 7, 1991, to accept appointment as the Commissioner of the Minnesota Department of Agriculture. Was reelected, but resigned before the 77th Legislature convened.	Greg Davids (IR)	February 18, 1991
50B	Joe Quinn (DFL)	Resigned January 7, 1991, to accept appointment as a Minnesota Judicial District Court Judge. Was reelected, but resigned before the 77th Legislature convened.	Phil Heir (IR)	February 7, 1991
47A	Linda Scheid (DFL)	Resigned November 1, 1991, to become Vice President for Community Affairs with Burnet Realty.	Rich Krambeer (IR)	January 2, 1992
44A	Sally Olsen (IR)	Resigned May 7, 1992, to accept appointment as a Minnesota Workers' Compensation Court of Appeals Judge.	Remained vacant	
23A	Terry Dempsey (IR)	Resigned May 11, 1992, to accept appointment as a Minnesota Judicial District Court Judge.	Remained vacant	
44B	Gloria Segal (DFL)	Resigned December 14, 1992, for health reasons related to a cancerous tumor.	Remained vacant	

== Notes ==
Preceded by Seventy-sixth Minnesota Legislature	Seventy-seventh Minnesota Legislature; 1991—1993	Succeeded by Seventy-eighth Minnesota Legislature
