= 78th Minnesota Legislature =

1993 to 1994 legislative session

Seventy-eighth Minnesota Legislature
←	77th Minnesota Legislature	79th Minnesota Legislature	→
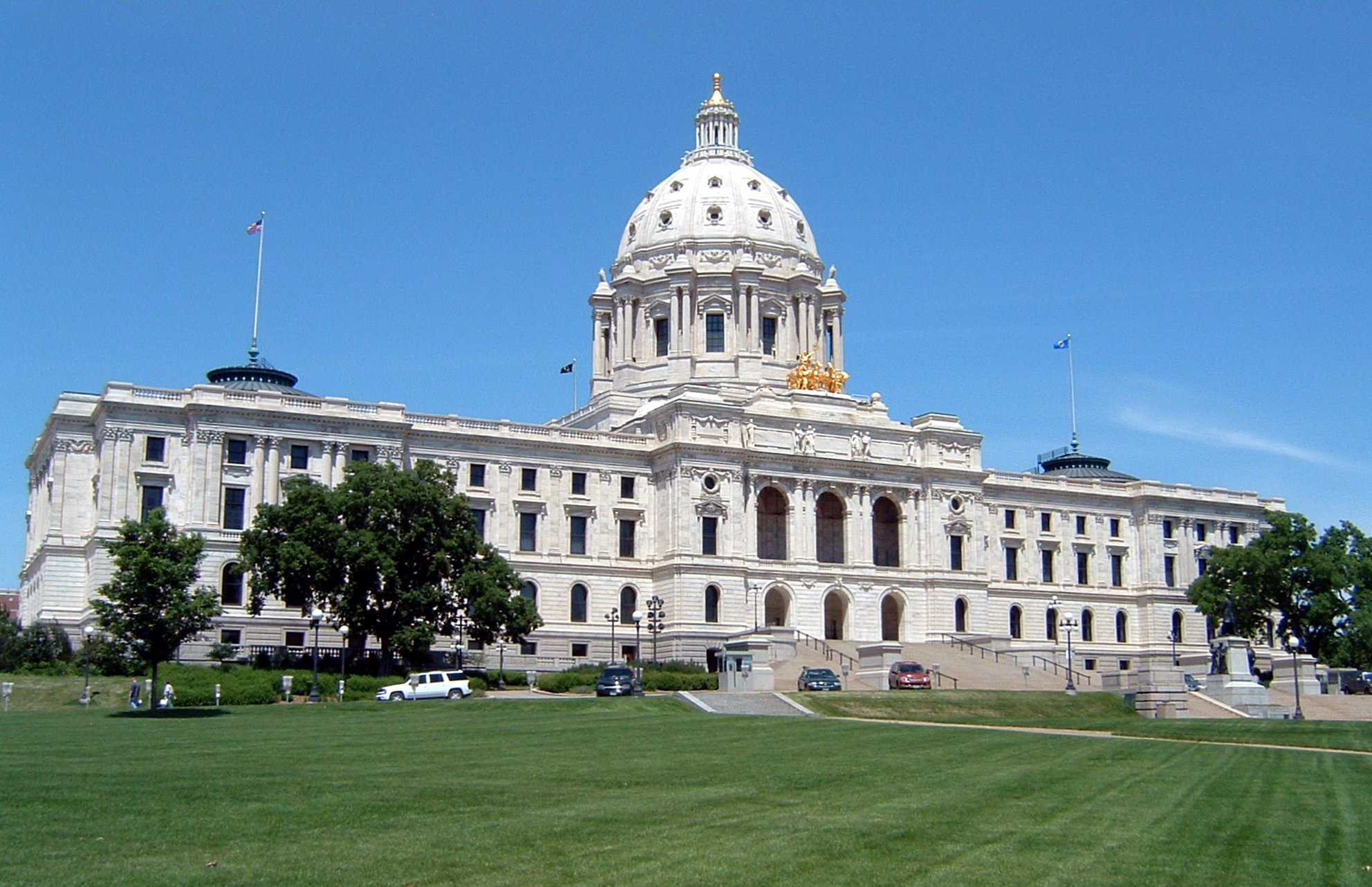

Overview
- Legislative body: Minnesota Legislature
- Jurisdiction: Minnesota, United States
- Meeting place: Minnesota State Capitol
- Term: January 5, 1993 – January 3, 1995
- Website: www.leg.state.mn.us

Minnesota State Senate
- Members: 67 Senators
- President: Allan Spear
- Majority Leader: Roger Moe
- Minority Leader: Dean Johnson
- Party control: Democratic-Farmer-Labor Party

Minnesota House of Representatives
- Members: 134 Representatives
- Speaker: Dee Long, Irv Anderson
- Majority Leader: Alan Welle, Irv Anderson, Phil Carruthers
- Minority Leader: Steve Sviggum
- Party control: Democratic-Farmer-Labor Party

The seventy-eighth Minnesota Legislature first convened on January 5, 1993. The 67 members of the Minnesota Senate and the 134 members of the Minnesota House of Representatives were elected during the General Election of November 3, 1992.

== Sessions ==
The legislature met in a regular session from January 5, 1993, to May 17, 1993. A special session was convened on May 27, 1993, to consider the state budget, health and human services finance, higher education finance, financial disclosure of election campaign contributions, contingency airplane replacement funding, sentencing for repeat domestic abusers, and a revisor's bill to correct technical errors.

A continuation of the regular session was held between February 22, 1994, and May 6, 1994. An additional special session was convened on August 31, 1994, to strengthen legislation regarding sexual predators.

Under this session, in 1994, a record of 6 special elections in one year were held for the Minnesota Legislature. The record was tied in 2025.

== Party summary ==
Resignations and new members are discussed in the "Membership changes" section, below.

=== Senate ===
	Party (Shading indicates majority caucus)		Total	Vacant
	DFL	IR	Total	Vacant
End of previous Legislature	46	20	66	1
Begin	45	22	67	0
September 19, 1994	45	21	66	1
December 4, 1994	45	22	67	0
January 1, 1995	43	24	67	0
Latest voting share	64%	36%		
Beginning of the next Legislature	43	24	67	0

=== House of Representatives ===
	Party (Shading indicates majority caucus)		Total	Vacant
	DFL	IR	Total	Vacant
End of previous Legislature	78	53	131	3
Begin	86	47	133	1
January 15, 1993	86	48	134	0
May 18, 1993	85	48	133	1
July 22, 1993	85	49	134	0
January 4, 1994	84	49	133	1
February 16, 1994	84	50	134	0
Latest voting share	63%	37%		
Beginning of the next Legislature	71	63	134	0

== Leadership ==
=== Senate ===
President of the Senate
Allan Spear (DFL-Minneapolis)

Senate Majority Leader
Roger Moe (DFL-Erskine)

Senate Minority Leader
Dean Johnson (R-Willmar)

=== House of Representatives ===
Speaker of the House
Until September 15, 1993 Dee Long (DFL-Minneapolis)
After September 15, 1993 Irv Anderson (DFL-International Falls)

House Majority Leader
Until March 23, 1993 Alan Welle (DFL-Willmar)
From March 25, 1993, to September 15, 1993 Irv Anderson (DFL-International Falls)
After September 15, 1993 Phil Carruthers (DFL-Brooklyn Center)

House Minority Leader
Steve Sviggum (R-Kenyon)

== Members ==
=== Senate ===
Name	District	City	Party
Adkins, Betty	19	St. Michael	DFL
Anderson, Ellen	66	St. Paul	DFL
Beckman, Tracy	26	Bricelyn	DFL
Belanger, William	41	Bloomington	IR
Benson, Duane	31	Lanesboro	IR
Benson, Joanne	16	St. Cloud	IR
Berg, Charlie	13	Chokio	DFL
Berglin, Linda	61	Minneapolis	DFL
Bertram, Joe	14	Paynesville	DFL
Betzold, Don	48	Fridley	DFL
Chandler, Kevin M.	55	White Bear Lake	DFL
Chmielewski, Florian	08	Sturgeon Lake	DFL
Cohen, Dick	64	St. Paul	DFL
Day, Dick	28	Owatonna	IR
Dille, Steve	20	Dassel	IR
Finn, Skip	04	Cass Lake	DFL
Flynn, Carol	62	Minneapolis	DFL
Frederickson, Dennis	23	New Ulm	IR
Hanson, Paula	50	Ham Lake	DFL
Hottinger, John	24	Mankato	DFL
Janezich, Jerry	05	Chisholm	DFL
Johnson, Dean	15	Willmar	IR
Johnson, Doug	06	Tower	DFL
Johnson, Janet	18	North Branch	DFL
Johnston, Terry	35	Prior Lake	IR
Kelly, Randy	67	St. Paul	DFL
Kiscaden, Sheila	30	Rochester	IR
Kleis, Dave	16	St. Cloud	IR
Knutson, David	36	Burnsville	IR
Kramer, Don	47	Brooklyn Center	IR
Krentz, Jane	51	May Township	DFL
Kroening, Carl	58	Minneapolis	DFL
Laidig, Gary	56	Stillwater	IR
Langseth, Keith	09	Glyndon	DFL
Larson, Cal	10	Fergus Falls	IR
Lesewski, Arlene	21	Marshall	IR
Lessard, Bob	03	International Falls	DFL
Luther, Bill	47	Brooklyn Park	DFL
Marty, John	54	Roseville	DFL
McGowan, Pat	33	Maple Grove	IR
Merriam, Gene	49	Coon Rapids	DFL
Metzen, James	39	South St. Paul	DFL
Moe, Roger	02	Erskine	DFL
Mondale, Ted	44	Saint Louis Park	DFL
Morse, Steven	32	Dakota	DFL
Murphy, Steve	29	Red Wing	DFL
Neuville, Thomas	25	Northfield	IR
Novak, Steve	52	New Brighton	DFL
Oliver, Edward	43	Deephaven	IR
Olson, Gen	34	Minnetrista	IR
Ourada, Mark	19	Buffalo	IR
Pappas, Sandra	65	St. Paul	DFL
Pariseau, Pat	37	Farmington	IR
Piper, Pat	27	Austin	DFL
Pogemiller, Larry	59	Minneapolis	DFL
Price, Leonard	57	Woodbury	DFL
Ranum, Jane	63	Minneapolis	DFL
Reichgott Junge, Ember	46	New Hope	DFL
Riveness, Phil	40	Bloomington	DFL
Robertson, Martha	45	Minnetonka	IR
Runbeck, Linda	53	Circle Pines	IR
Sams, Dallas	11	Staples	DFL
Samuelson, Don	12	Brainerd	DFL
Scheevel, Kenric	31	Preston	IR
Solon, Sam	07	Duluth	DFL
Spear, Allan	60	Minneapolis	DFL
Stevens, Dan	17	Mora	IR
Stumpf, LeRoy	01	Thief River Falls	DFL
Terwilliger, Roy	42	Edina	IR
Vickerman, Jim	22	Tracy	DFL
Wiener, Deanna	38	Eagan	DFL

=== House of Representatives ===
Name	District	City	Party
Abrams, Ron	45A	Minnetonka	IR
Anderson, Bob	10A	Ottertail	DFL
Anderson, Irv	03A	International Falls	DFL
Asch, Marc	53B	North Oaks	DFL
Battaglia, David Peter	06A	Two Harbors	DFL
Bauerly, Jerry	17B	Sauk Rapids	DFL
Beard, Pat	57B	Cottage Grove	DFL
Bergson, Brian Merritt	48A	Osseo	DFL
Bertram, Jeff	14B	Paynesville	DFL
Bettermann, Hilda	10B	Brandon	IR
Bishop, Dave	30B	Rochester	IR
Blatz, Kathleen	40B	Bloomington	IR
Brown, Chuck	13A	Appleton	DFL
Brown, Kay	25A	Northfield	DFL
Carlson, Lyndon	46B	Crystal	DFL
Carruthers, Phil	47B	Brooklyn Center	DFL
Clark, Karen	61A	Minneapolis	DFL
Commers, Tim	38A	Eagan	IR
Cooper, Roger	15B	Bird Island	DFL
Dauner, Marvin	09B	Hawley	DFL
Davids, Gregory	31B	Preston	IR
Dawkins, Andy	65A	St. Paul	DFL
Dehler, Steve	14A	St. Joseph	IR
Delmont, Mike	51A	Lexington	DFL
Dempsey, Jerry	29A	Hastings	IR
Dorn, John	24A	Mankato	DFL
Erhardt, Ron	42A	Edina	IR
Evans, Geri	52B	New Brighton	DFL
Farrell, Jim	67A	St. Paul	DFL
Finseth, Tim	01B	Angus Township	IR
Frerichs, Don	31A	Rochester	IR
Garcia, Edwina	63B	Richfield	DFL
Girard, Jim	21A	Lynd	IR
Goodno, Kevin	09A	Moorhead	IR
Greenfield, Lee	62A	Minneapolis	DFL
Greiling, Mindy	54B	Roseville	DFL
Gruenes, Dave	16B	St. Cloud	IR
Gutknecht, Gil	30A	Rochester	IR
Hasskamp, Kris	12A	Crosby	DFL
Haukoos, Bob	27A	Albert Lea	IR
Hausman, Alice	66B	St. Paul	DFL
Holsten, Mark	56A	Stillwater	IR
Hugoson, Gene	26A	Granada	IR
Huntley, Thomas	06B	Duluth	DFL
Jacobs, Joel	49B	Coon Rapids	DFL
Jaros, Mike	07B	Duluth	DFL
Jefferson, Jeff	58B	Minneapolis	DFL
Jennings, Loren Geo	18B	Harris	DFL
Johnson, Alice	48B	Spring Lake Park	DFL
Johnson, Bob	04A	Bemidji	DFL
Johnson, Virgil	32B	Caledonia	IR
Kahn, Phyllis	59B	Minneapolis	DFL
Kalis, Henry	26B	Walters	DFL
Kelley, Steve	44A	Hopkins	DFL
Kelso, Becky	35B	Shakopee	DFL
Kinkel, Tony	04B	Park Rapids	DFL
Klinzing, Stephanie	19B	Elk River	DFL
Knickerbocker, Jerry	43B	Minnetonka	IR
Knight, Kevin	40B	Bloomington	IR
Koppendrayer, LeRoy	17A	Princeton	IR
Krinkie, Philip	53A	Shoreview	IR
Krueger, Rick	11B	Staples	DFL
Lasley, Harold	18A	Cambridge	DFL
Leppik, Peggy	45B	Golden Valley	IR
Lieder, Bernard	02A	Crookston	DFL
Limmer, Warren	33B	Maple Grove	IR
Lindner, Arlon	33A	Corcoran	IR
Long, Dee	60A	Minneapolis	DFL
Lourey, Becky	08B	Kerrick	DFL
Luther, Darlene	47A	Brooklyn Park	DFL
Lynch, Teresa	50B	Andover	IR
Macklin, Bill	37B	Lakeville	IR
Mahon, Mark	40A	Bloomington	DFL
Mariani, Carlos	65B	St. Paul	DFL
McCollum, Betty	55B	North St. Paul	DFL
McGuire, Mary Jo	54A	Falcon Heights	DFL
Milbert, Bob	39B	South St. Paul	DFL
Molnau, Carol	35A	Chaska	IR
Morrison, Connie	36B	Burnsville	IR
Mosel, Darrel	23B	Gaylord	DFL
Munger, Willard	07A	Duluth	DFL
Murphy, Mary	08A	Hermantown	DFL
Neary, Pamela	56B	Afton	DFL
Nelson, Syd	11A	Sebeka	DFL
Ness, Bob	20A	Dassel	IR
Olson, Edgar	02B	Fosston	DFL
Olson, Katy	22B	Sherburn	DFL
Olson, Mark	19A	Big Lake	IR
Onnen, Tony	20B	Cokato	IR
Opatz, Joe	16A	St. Cloud	DFL
Orenstein, Howard	64B	St. Paul	DFL
Orfield, Myron	60B	Minneapolis	DFL
Osthoff, Tom	66A	St. Paul	DFL
Ostrom, Don	24B	St. Peter	DFL
Ozment, Dennis	37A	Rosemount	IR
Pauly, Sidney	42B	Eden Prairie	IR
Pawlenty, Tim	38B	Eagan	IR
Pelowski, Gene	32A	Winona	DFL
Perlt, Walt	57A	Woodbury	DFL
Petersen, Doug	13B	Madison	DFL
Pugh, Tom	39A	South St. Paul	DFL
Reding, Leo	27B	Austin	DFL
Rest, Ann	46A	New Hope	DFL
Rhodes, Jim	44B	St. Louis Park	IR
Rice, Jim	58A	Minneapolis	DFL
Rodosovich, Peter	25B	Faribault	DFL
Rukavina, Tom	05A	Virginia	DFL
Sarna, John	59A	Minneapolis	DFL
Seagren, Alice	41A	Bloomington	IR
Sekhon, Kathleen	50A	Burns Township	DFL
Simoneau, Wayne	52A	Fridley	DFL
Skoglund, Wes	62B	Minneapolis	DFL
Smith, Steve	34A	Mound	IR
Solberg, Loren	03B	Bovey	DFL
Sparby, Wally	01B	Thief River Falls	DFL
Stanius, Brad	55A	White Bear Lake	IR
Steensma, Andy	21B	Luverne	DFL
Sviggum, Steve	28B	Kenyon	IR
Swenson, Doug	51B	Forest Lake	IR
Tomassoni, Dave	05B	Chisholm	DFL
Tompkins, Eileen	36A	Apple Valley	IR
Trimble, Steve	67B	St. Paul	DFL
Tunheim, Jim	01A	Kennedy	DFL
Van Dellen, H. Todd	34B	Plymouth	IR
Van Engen, Tom	15A	Spicer	IR
Vellenga, Kathleen	64A	St. Paul	DFL
Vickerman, Barb	23A	Redwood Falls	IR
Wagenius, Jean	63A	Minneapolis	DFL
Waltman, Bobby Joe	29B	Elgin	IR
Weaver, Charlie	49A	Anoka	IR
Wejcman, Linda	61B	Minneapolis	DFL
Welle, Alan	15A	Willmar	DFL
Wenzel, Steve	12B	Little Falls	DFL
Winter, Ted	22A	Fulda	DFL
Wolf, Ken	41B	Burnsville	IR
Worke, Gary	28A	Waseca	IR
Workman, Tom	43A	Chanhassen	IR

== Membership changes ==
=== Senate ===
District	Vacated by	Reason for change	Successor	Date successor seated
31	Duane Benson (IR)	Resigned September 19, 1994, to become Director of the Minnesota Business Partnership.	Kenric Scheevel (IR)	December 8, 1994
19	Betty Adkins (DFL)	Announced retirement in June 1994, effective January 1, 1995.	Mark Ourada (IR)	January 3, 1995
47	Bill Luther (DFL)	Resigned January 1, 1995, to take office as the United States representative from Minnesota's 6th congressional district on January 3, 1995, pursuant to winning election to that office in the General Election of 1994.	Don Kramer (IR)	January 9, 1995
16	Joanne Benson (IR)	Became Lieutenant Governor of Minnesota on January 3, 1995, pursuant to winning election to that office in the General Election of 1994.	Dave Kleis (IR)	January 9, 1995

=== House of Representatives ===
District	Vacated by	Reason for change	Successor	Date successor seated
44B	Gloria Segal (DFL)	Resigned December 14, 1992, for health reasons related to a cancerous tumor. Was reelected, but resigned before the 78th Legislature convened.	Jim Rhodes (IR)	January 15, 1993
01B	Wally Sparby (DFL)	Resigned May 18, 1993, to accept appointment as the State Director of the Agricultural Stabilization and Conservation Service.	Tim Finseth (IR)	July 22, 1993
15A	Alan Welle (DFL)	Resigned January 4, 1994, as part of a plea agreement related to abuse of telephone privileges in the "phonegate" scandal.	Tom Van Engen (IR)	February 16, 1994
40B	Kathleen Blatz (IR)	Resigned effective January 24, 1994, to accept appointment as a Hennepin County District Court Judge.	Kevin Knight (IR)	January 24, 1994
