= 1992 Minnesota House of Representatives election =

- November 3, 1992

All 134 seats in the Minnesota House of Representatives 68 seats needed for a majority
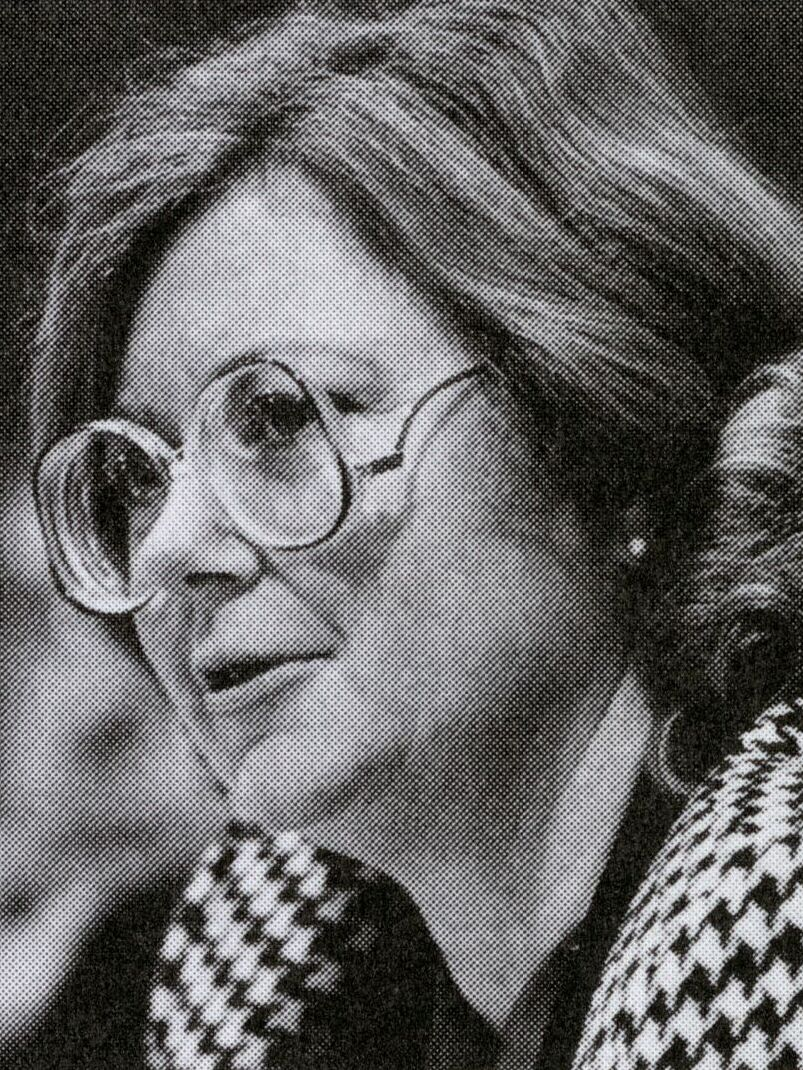

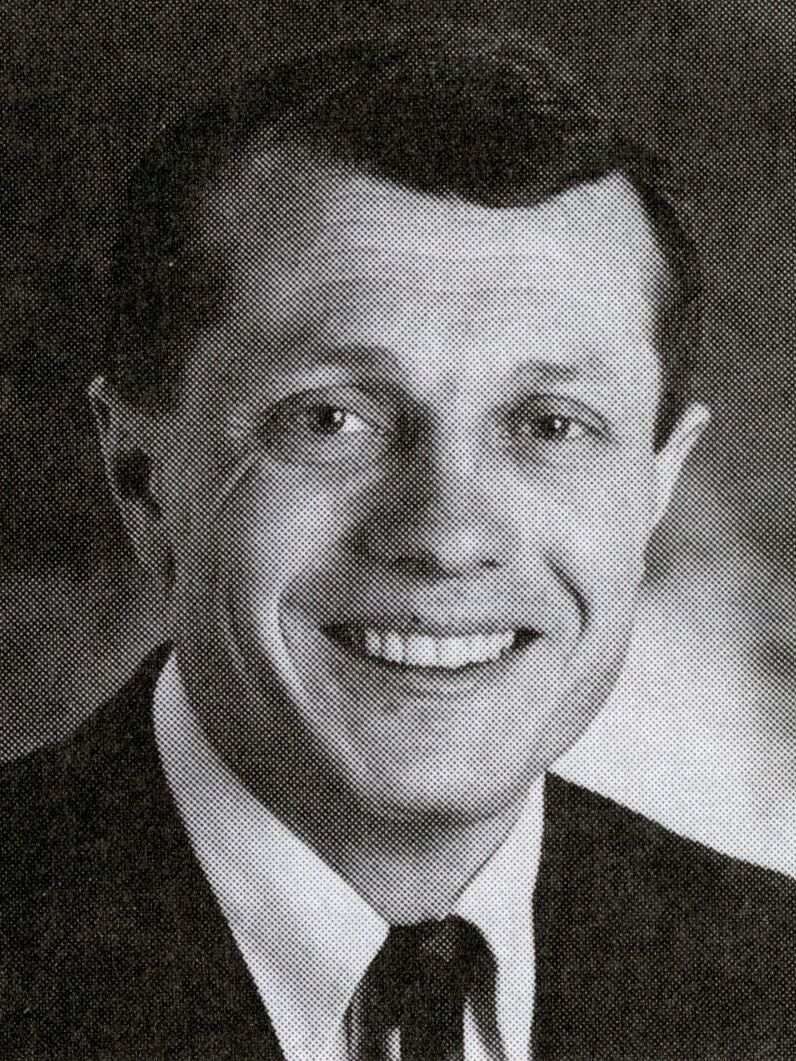
	Majority party	Minority party
Leader	Dee Long	Steve Sviggum
Party	Democratic (DFL)	Ind.-Republican
Leader since	July 11, 1991	April 17, 1992
Leader's seat	60A–Minneapolis	28B–Kenyon
Last election	80 seats	54 seats
Seats before	79	55
Seats won	87	47
Seat change	▲8	▼8
Popular vote	1,186,532	1,003,381
Speaker before election
Dee Long
Democratic (DFL)
Elected Speaker
Dee Long
Democratic (DFL)

The 1992 Minnesota House of Representatives election was held in the U.S. state of Minnesota on November 3, 1992, to elect members to the House of Representatives of the 78th Minnesota Legislature. A primary election was held on September 15, 1992.

The Minnesota Democratic–Farmer–Labor Party (DFL) won a majority of seats, remaining the majority party, followed by the Independent-Republicans of Minnesota. The new Legislature convened on January 5, 1993.

== Results ==
Summary of the November 3, 1992 Minnesota House of Representatives election results
Party	Candidates	Votes	Seats		
Party	Candidates	Votes	No.	∆No.	%
Minnesota Democratic–Farmer–Labor Party	127	1,186,532	87	▲8	64.93
Independent-Republicans of Minnesota	130	1,003,381	47	▼8	35.07
Libertarian Party of Minnesota	1	593	0	Steady	0.00
Constitution Party of Minnesota	1	253	0	Steady	0.00
Independent	1	1,387	0	Steady	0.00
Total			134	±0	100.00
Turnout (out of 3,187,255 eligible voters)	2,355,796	73.91%		▲15.15 pp	
Source: Minnesota Secretary of State, Minnesota Legislative Reference Library

== See also ==
- Minnesota Senate election, 1992
- Minnesota gubernatorial election, 1990
