= 1992 Minnesota Senate election =

Minnesota Senate election, 1992
- November 3, 1992

All 67 seats in the Minnesota Senate 34 seats needed for a majority
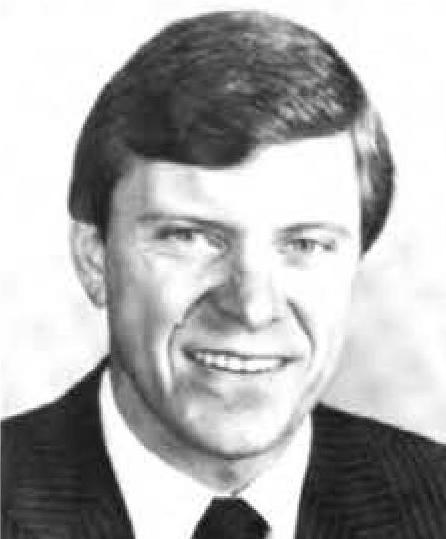

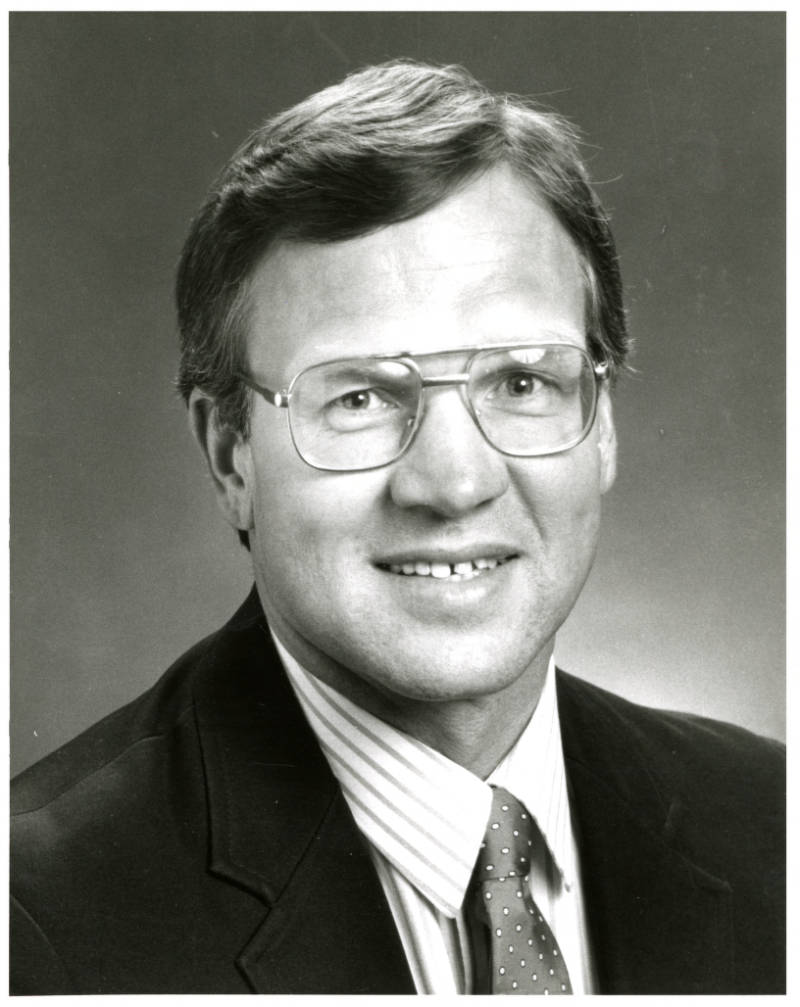
	Majority party	Minority party
Leader	Roger Moe	Duane Benson
Party	Democratic (DFL)	Ind.-Republican
Leader since	1980	January 5, 1987
Leader's seat	2nd–Erskine	31st–Lanesboro
Last election	46 seats	21 seats
Seats won	45	22
Seat change	▼1	▲1
Popular vote	1,247,594	970,766
Majority Leader before election
Roger Moe
Democratic (DFL)
Elected Majority Leader
Roger Moe
Democratic (DFL)

The 1992 Minnesota Senate election was held in the U.S. state of Minnesota on November 3, 1992, to elect members to the Senate of the 78th and 79th Minnesota Legislatures. A primary election was held on September 15, 1992.

The Minnesota Democratic–Farmer–Labor Party (DFL) won a majority of seats, remaining the majority party, followed by the Independent-Republicans of Minnesota. The new Legislature convened on January 5, 1993.

== Results ==
Summary of the November 3, 1992 Minnesota Senate election results
Party	Candidates	Votes	Seats		
Party	Candidates	Votes	No.	∆No.	%
Minnesota Democratic–Farmer–Labor Party	67	1,247,594	45	▼1	67.16
Independent-Republicans of Minnesota	66	970,766	22	▲1	32.84
Grassroots Party of Minnesota	1	2,179	0	Steady	0.00
Independent	4	24,460	0	Steady	0.00
Total			67	±0	100.00
Turnout (out of 3,187,255 eligible voters)	2,355,796	73.91%		▲15.15 pp	
Source: Minnesota Secretary of State, Minnesota Legislative Reference Library

== See also ==
- Minnesota House of Representatives election, 1992
- Minnesota gubernatorial election, 1990
