= Margaret Anderson Kelliher =

American politician (born 1968)

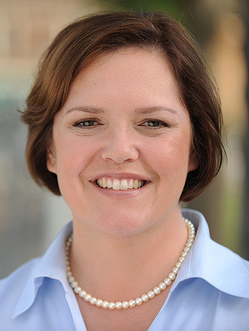
- Kelliher in 2010

Minneapolis City Operations Officer
- Incumbent
- Assumed office December 15, 2023
- Appointed by: Jacob Frey

Director of the Minneapolis Department of Public Works
- In office March 2, 2022 – March 19, 2024
- Appointed by: Jacob Frey
- Succeeded by: Timothy Sexton

Commissioner of Minnesota Department of Transportation
- In office January 7, 2019 – March 1, 2022
- Governor: Tim Walz
- Preceded by: Charles Zelle
- Succeeded by: Nancy Daubenberger (Acting)

57th Speaker of the Minnesota House of Representatives
- In office January 3, 2007 – January 4, 2011
- Preceded by: Steve Sviggum
- Succeeded by: Kurt Zellers

Minority Leader of the Minnesota House of Representatives
- In office June 20, 2006 – January 3, 2007
- Preceded by: Matt Entenza
- Succeeded by: Marty Seifert

Member of the Minnesota House of Representatives from the 60A district
- In office January 5, 1999 – January 4, 2011
- Preceded by: Dee Long
- Succeeded by: Marion Greene

Personal details
- Born: March 11, 1968 (age 58) Mankato, Minnesota, U.S.
- Party: Democratic
- Spouse: David Kelliher
- Children: 2
- Education: Gustavus Adolphus College (BA); Harvard University (MPA)

Margaret Anderson Kelliher (born March 11, 1968) is an American politician, City Operations Officer for the City of Minneapolis, former Director of the Minneapolis Department of Public Works, former Commissioner of the Minnesota Department of Transportation, and a former member of the Minnesota House of Representatives. A member of the Minnesota Democratic–Farmer–Labor Party, she represented District 60A, which includes portions of the city of Minneapolis in Hennepin County, located in the Twin Cities metropolitan area. First elected in 1999, she served until 2011, also serving as the Speaker from 2007 to 2011. She is the second woman (after Dee Long) to hold the position of House speaker. She was an unsuccessful candidate for the DFL nomination for Governor of Minnesota in the 2010 gubernatorial election, losing to former Senator Mark Dayton. Anderson left the Minnesota House of Representatives at the conclusion of her term in 2011 and re-entered politics when she ran for the DFL nomination to the U.S. House of Representatives in Minnesota's 5th congressional district in 2018, losing to Ilhan Omar. Since 2019 Kelliher, has worked in transportation management roles for the government, first as Commissioner of MnDOT, and later as Director of Public Works for the City of Minneapolis. She currently serves as the City Operations Officer for the City of Minneapolis.

== Political career ==
Kelliher worked as a legislative staffer for then-Speaker Robert Vanasek and then-Senate President Allan Spear before being elected to the legislature herself.

Anderson Kelliher served as Minority Whip from 2003 to 2006, and in January 2006 became the first Assistant Minority Leader of the Minnesota House. In June 2006, she was selected by her caucus to succeed Rep. Matt Entenza as Minority Leader, assuming the position after the legislative session came to a close. After the Democrats won control of the House in the 2006 election, she was selected by her caucus to be Speaker starting in January 2007. She succeeded Rep. Steve Sviggum in that position. On January 6, 2009, she was re-elected Speaker for the 2009–2010 biennium.

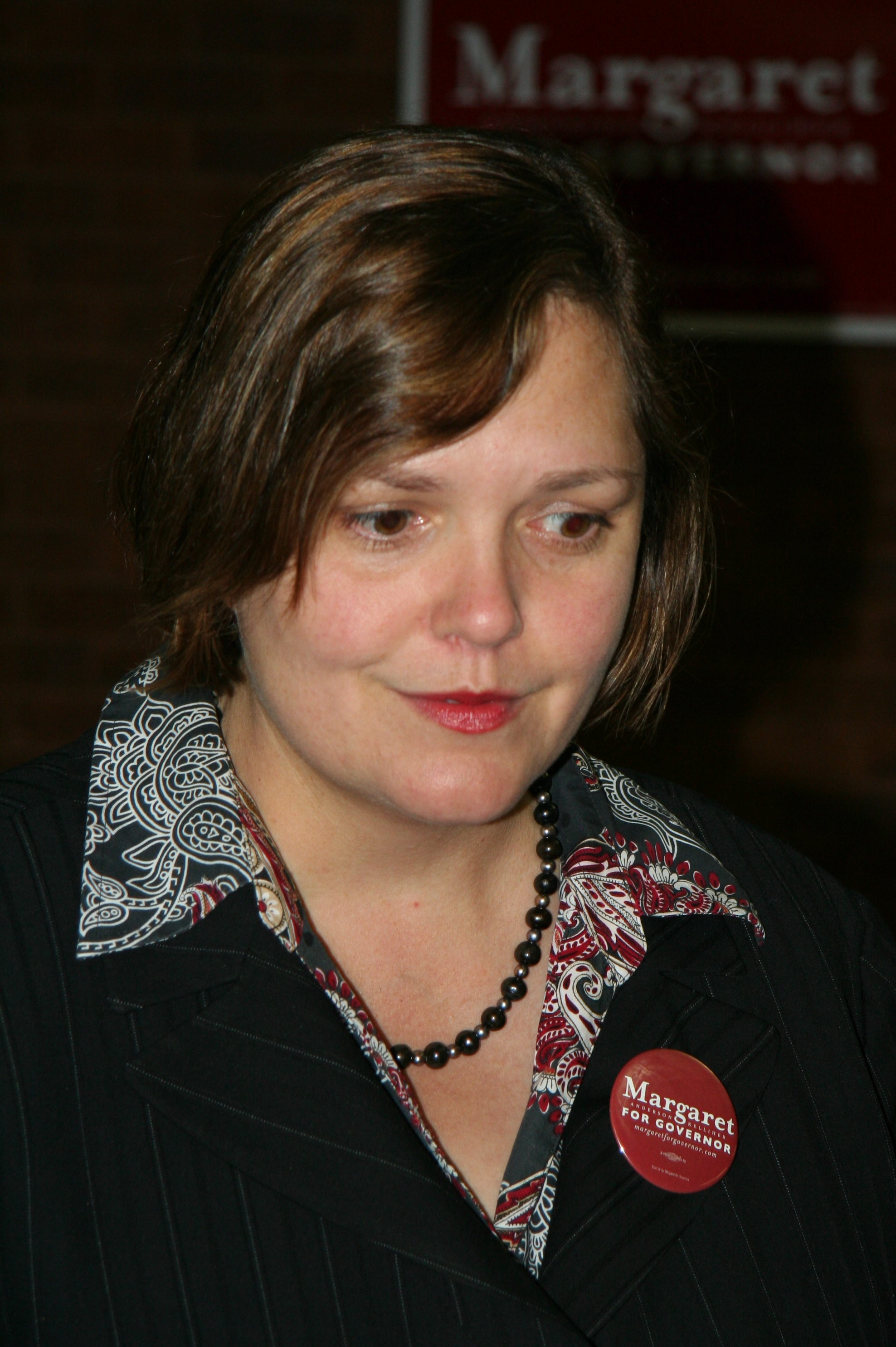
Kelliher campaigning for governor in 2010

=== 2010 gubernatorial campaign ===
On September 16, 2009, Anderson Kelliher announced that she would seek the DFL endorsement for governor in 2010. She joined a field that included two other former house minority leaders, Democrat Matt Entenza and Republican Marty Seifert.

On April 24, 2010, Anderson Kelliher was endorsed by the DFL state convention to serve as the party's candidate for governor. Anderson Kelliher won after her closest rival, Minneapolis Mayor R.T. Rybak, dropped out after the sixth convention ballot. This made her the first woman to earn major-party endorsement for a gubernatorial election in Minnesota.

While Kelliher won the party's endorsement, she still had to win the Democratic primary. On August 10, 2010, Kelliher lost a narrow primary election to former U.S. Senator Mark Dayton, ending her campaign.

=== Post gubernatorial campaign ===
Anderson ran for the DFL nomination to the U.S. House of Representatives in Minnesota's 5th congressional district in 2018, losing to Ilhan Omar.

== Political positions ==
During her 2010 primary campaign Kelliher announced several policy and budget initiatives. In July 2010, she proposed that the state of Minnesota should borrow 2 billion dollars over 5 years to stimulate the construction industry in Minnesota; however, she did not support using general fund dollars to build a new Vikings Stadium.

== Career as a government official ==
In 2019, Anderson Kelliher was appointed by Governor Tim Walz to serve as the Commissioner of the Minnesota Department of Transportation. On March 2, 2022, she became Director of the Minneapolis Public Works Department.

During the redesign of Hennepin Avenue in Minneapolis, Kelliher changed the proposed design of the street change from 24/7 bus lanes to allowing parking in bus lanes during certain hours of the day. Public works staff considered dynamic parking lanes to "pose a moderate to high risk" to the Metro E Line, an analysis that was not presented to the city council committee in charge of approving the design. Mayor Jacob Frey and Kelliher argued that allowing parking would help business owners in the corridor.

Kelliher was named the city of Minneapolis operations officer in 2024. She is the first person to serve in the role which oversees 17 city departments.

== Personal life ==
Anderson Kelliher grew up on a dairy farm in rural Blue Earth County, Minnesota. After graduating from Mankato West High School, she received a B.A. in history and political science from Gustavus Adolphus College in St. Peter, Minnesota, and a Master of Public Administration from Harvard University. Anderson Kelliher and her husband, David Kelliher, have two children, Patrick and Frances.

== See also ==
- Politics of Minnesota
- Politics of the United States
- List of female speakers of legislatures in the United States

Minnesota House of Representatives
Preceded by Steve Sviggum	Speaker of the Minnesota House of Representatives; 2007–2011	Succeeded by Kurt Zellers
Preceded by Matt Entenza	Minnesota House Minority Leader; 2006–2007	Succeeded by Marty Seifert
Preceded by Dee Long	State Representative from Minnesota District 60A; 1999–2011	Succeeded by Marion Greene
Party political offices
Preceded by Mike Hatch	Endorsed Gubernatorial Candidate, Minnesota DFL State Convention; 2010	Succeeded by Most Recent Endorsee
