= 1998 Minnesota Secretary of State election =

- November 3, 1998
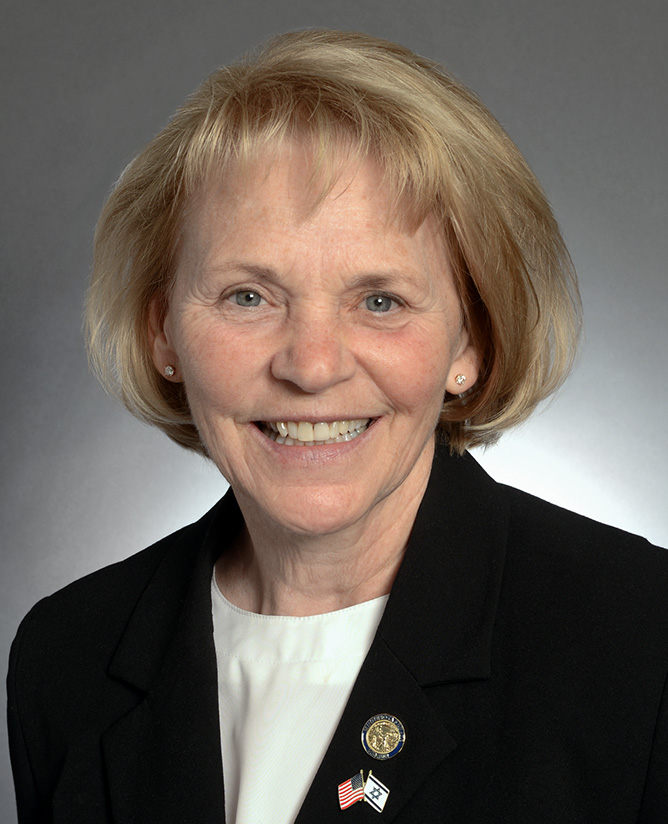

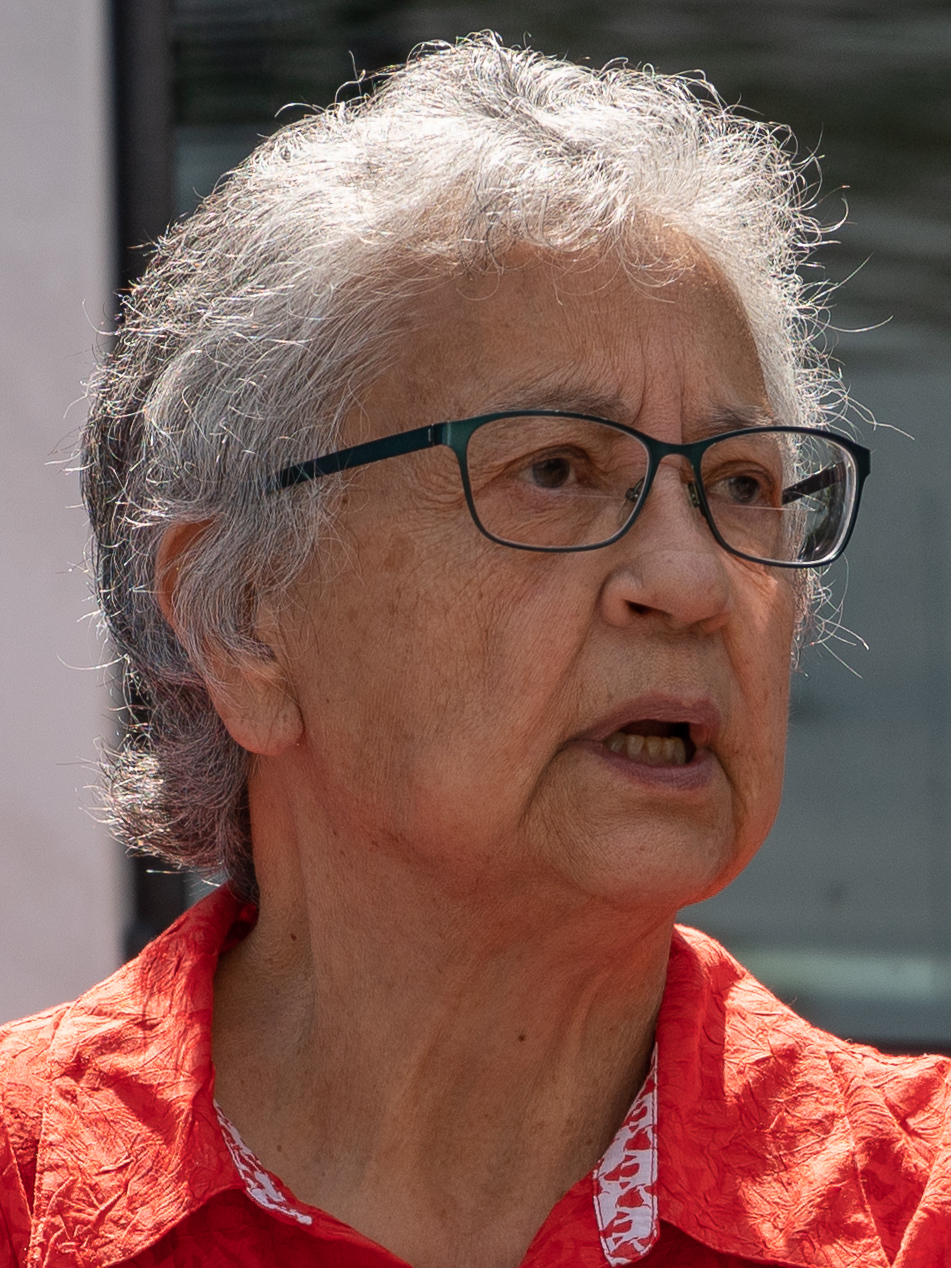

Nominee	Mary Kiffmeyer	Edwina Garcia	Alan Shilepsky
Party	Republican	Democratic (DFL)	Reform
Popular vote	928,576	818,236	192,997
Percentage	46.75%	41.20%	9.72%
- County results Kiffmeyer: 40–50% 50–60% Garcia: 40–50% 50–60%
Secretary of State before election
Joan Growe
Democratic (DFL)
Elected Secretary of State
Mary Kiffmeyer
Republican

The 1998 Minnesota Secretary of State election was held on November 3, 1998, in order to elect the Secretary of State of Minnesota. Republican nominee Mary Kiffmeyer defeated Democratic–Farmer–Labor nominee and incumbent member of the Minnesota House of Representatives from the 63B district Edwina Garcia, Reform nominee Alan Shilepsky and Libertarian nominee Kenneth Iverson.

== Reform primary ==
The Reform Party primary was held on September 11, 1998, and featured Alan Shilepsky as the sole candidate. He was subsequently elected with 100.00% of the vote.

=== Results ===
Reform primary election results
Party	Candidate	Votes	%
Reform	Alan Shilepsky	13,905	100.00
Total votes		13,905	100.00

== Democratic–Farmer–Labor primary ==
The Democratic–Farmer–Labor Party primary was held on September 15, 1998, and featured incumbent member of the Minnesota House of Representatives from the 63B district Edwina Garcia, Jennifer Mattson, Dick Franson and Gregg A. Iverson as possible candidates. Garcia won the primary with 36.27% of the vote.

=== Results ===
Reform primary election results
Party	Candidate	Votes	%
Democratic (DFL)	Edwina Garcia	149,400	36.27
Democratic (DFL)	Jennifer Mattson	116,092	28.18
Democratic (DFL)	Dick Franson	75,156	18.24
Democratic (DFL)	Gregg A. Iverson	71,297	17.31
Total votes		411,945	100.00

== Republican primary ==
The Republican Party primary was held on September 15, 1998, and featured Mary Kiffmeyer and Don Koenig as candidates. Kiffmeyer won the primary with 55.36% of the vote.

=== Results ===
Republican primary election results
Party	Candidate	Votes	%
Republican	Mary Kiffmeyer	71,678	55.36
Republican	Don Koenig	57,799	44.64
Total votes		129,477	100.00

== General election ==
On election day, November 3, 1998, Republican nominee Mary Kiffmeyer won the election by a margin of 110,340 votes against her foremost opponent Democratic–Farmer–Labor nominee Edwina Garcia, thereby gaining Republican control over the office of Secretary of State. Kiffmeyer was sworn in as the 20th Secretary of State of Minnesota on January 3, 1999.

=== Results ===
Minnesota Secretary of State election, 1998
Party	Candidate	Votes	%
Republican	Mary Kiffmeyer	928,576	46.75
Democratic (DFL)	Edwina Garcia	818,236	41.20
Reform	Alan Shilepsky	192,997	9.72
Libertarian	Kenneth Iverson	44,663	2.25
Write-in		1,742	0.08
Total votes		1,986,214	100.00
Republican gain from Democratic (DFL)			
