= Carol Dyke =

American politician

Member of the Minnesota House of Representatives from the 28A district
- In office January 8, 1985 – December 5, 1986
- Preceded by: Bruce W. "Buzz" Anderson
- Succeeded by: Ted Winter

Personal details
- Born: December 1938 (age 87)
- Education: University of Minnesota

Carol Dyke (born 1938) is a former member of the Minnesota House of Representatives. She received her bachelor's degree in psychology at the University of Minnesota. She was living in Worthington, Minnesota when she was elected for district 28A on November 6, 1984, where she represented Cottonwood, Murray, and Nobles counties. During her tenure she served as the chair of the Rural Economy subcommittee of the Agriculture Committee as well as serving on committees related to commerce, governmental operations, and local and urban affairs. She ran for re-election against Ted Winter, but lost. After she lost, she moved to Sioux Falls, South Dakota and resigned from her seat (while the legislature was not in session).
