= Bob Neuenschwander =

American politician (1948–2022)

- Official portrait, 1983

Member of the Minnesota House of Representatives for Itasca County and Koochiching County
- In office January 4, 1983 – January 7, 1991
- Preceded by: Irv Anderson
- Succeeded by: Irv Anderson

Personal details
- Born: Robert William Neuenschwander; July 4, 1948 Chicago, Illinois, U.S.
- Party: Democratic
- Spouse: Dale Neuenschwander (m. 1969; div. 1978) Kathy Goodall (m. 1996)
- Children: 1
- Education: Orr High School (Minnesota)
- Occupation: Businessman, politician

Robert William "Bob" Neuenschwander (/nəhwənswɑːndər/; newenswander July 4, 1948 – April 13, 2022) was an American businessman and politician. He served as a member of the Minnesota House of Representatives between 1983 and 1991 for the Democratic Party.

== Early life and education ==
Neuenschwander was born July 4, 1948, in Chicago, Illinois, to Charles (1920-2005) and Mildred Neuenschwander. He had one brother Charles Roy Neuenschwander. His great-grandfather, Gottfried Neuenschwander, emigrated to the United States from Switzerland in 1884 aged 10.

== Career ==
He served in the United States Air Force from 1969 to 1974. Neuenschwander went to Bemidji State University and was a businessman who owned a taxidermy business and gift shop: Border Bob's.

== Politics ==
He served as a Democratic member of the Minnesota House of Representatives for four terms from January 4, 1983, through January 7, 1991.

== Personal life ==
Neuenschwander was married twice. In 1969 he married Dale Neuenschwander with whom he had a son; Robb. With his second wife Kathy, whom he married on December 31, 1996, he acquired a step-son, Zach Herbert. Neuenschwander died in International Falls, Minnesota after being ill for a long time.
