= Ann Wynia =

American politician

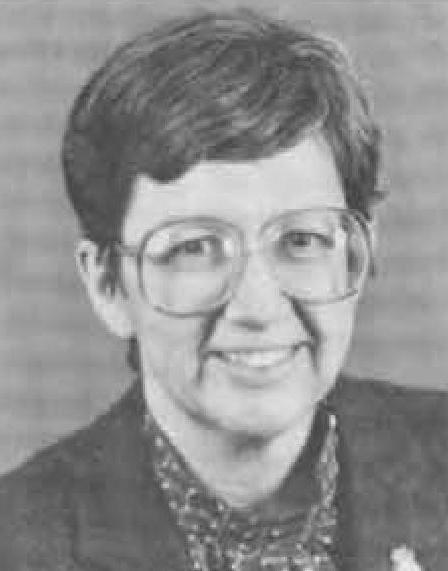
- Wynia in 1985

Member of the Minnesota House of Representatives from District 63B
- In office January 1977 – January 1989
- Succeeded by: Alice Hausman

Minnesota House Majority Leader
- In office 1987–1989
- Preceded by: Robert Vanasek
- Succeeded by: Dee Long

Personal details
- Born: September 29, 1943 (age 82) Fort Worth, Texas, U.S.
- Party: Democratic
- Spouse: Gary Wynia
- Education: University of Texas, Arlington (BA); University of Wisconsin, Madison (MA)

Ann Wynia (née Jobe, born September 29, 1943) is an American politician who served in the Minnesota House of Representatives from 1977 to 1989. A member of the Democratic Farmer-Labor Party, Wynia represented portions of the city of St. Paul and served as Majority Leader from 1987 to 1989. In 1989 Governor Rudy Perpich appointed her Commissioner of Minnesota's Department of Human Services until 1990. She was the Democratic Party's nominee for United States Senate in the 1994 election. After a defeat by U.S. Congressman Rod Grams, Wynia served as the President of North Hennepin Community College in Brooklyn Park, Minnesota from 1997 until her retirement in 2010.

== Biography ==
=== Early life and education ===
Wynia was born in Fort Worth, Texas, and attended Arlington High School. She earned her Bachelor of Arts degree in Government from the University of Texas at Arlington, and her Master of Arts degree in political science from the University of Wisconsin in 1968.

=== Career outside politics ===
Prior to entering public office, Wynia was a full-time lecturer at North Hennepin Community College from 1970 to 1977. She served as a regent of the University of Minnesota and founded the Block Nurse Program, which provides in-home care for senior citizens (now merged with the Elderberry Institute). She also served on the board of the Amherst H. Wilder Foundation, the Bush Foundation and Health Partners. She was president of North Hennepin Community College until July 2010. John O'Brien, a former administrator at Century College, is the current president. In 1996, Wynia was elected to the Common Cause National Governing Board.

=== Political career ===
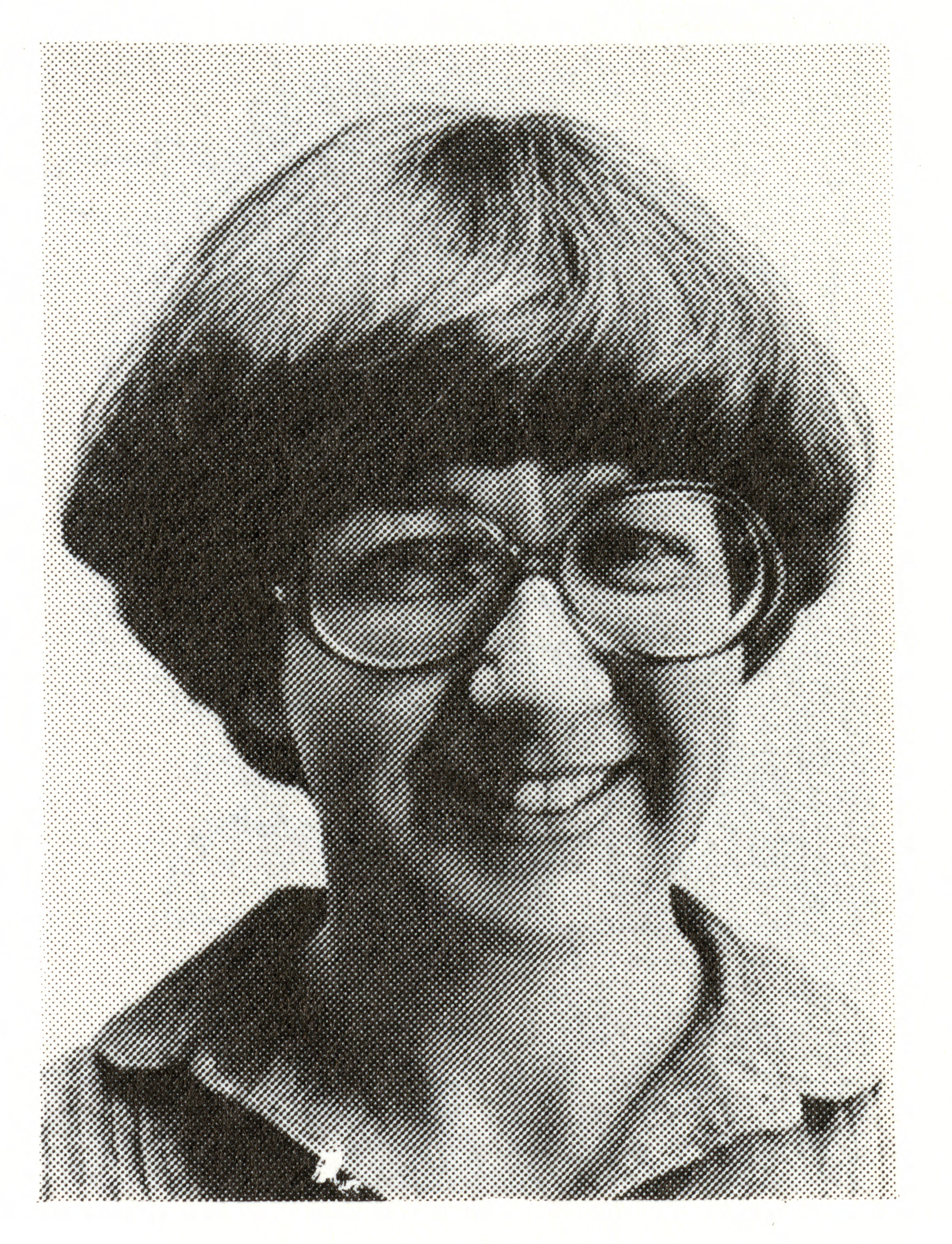
Portrait of Minnesota Representative Ann Wynia, 1981-1982 Legislative Session.

Wynia represented Minnesota's 62A House district from 1977 to 1982 and the redistricted 63B House district from 1983 to 1989. She was the majority leader from 1987 to 1989. She subsequently became commissioner of Minnesota's Department of Human Services, and was the Democratic Party's nominee for the 1994 U.S. Senate election.

== Awards and distinctions ==
- 1995 – Distinguished Alumna, University of Texas at Arlington

Party political offices
Preceded by Skip Humphrey	Democratic nominee for U.S. Senator from Minnesota (Class 1); 1994	Succeeded by Mark Dayton
Preceded by Robert Vanasek	Minnesota House Majority Leader; 1987-1989	Succeeded by Dee Long
