= Connie Levi =

American politician

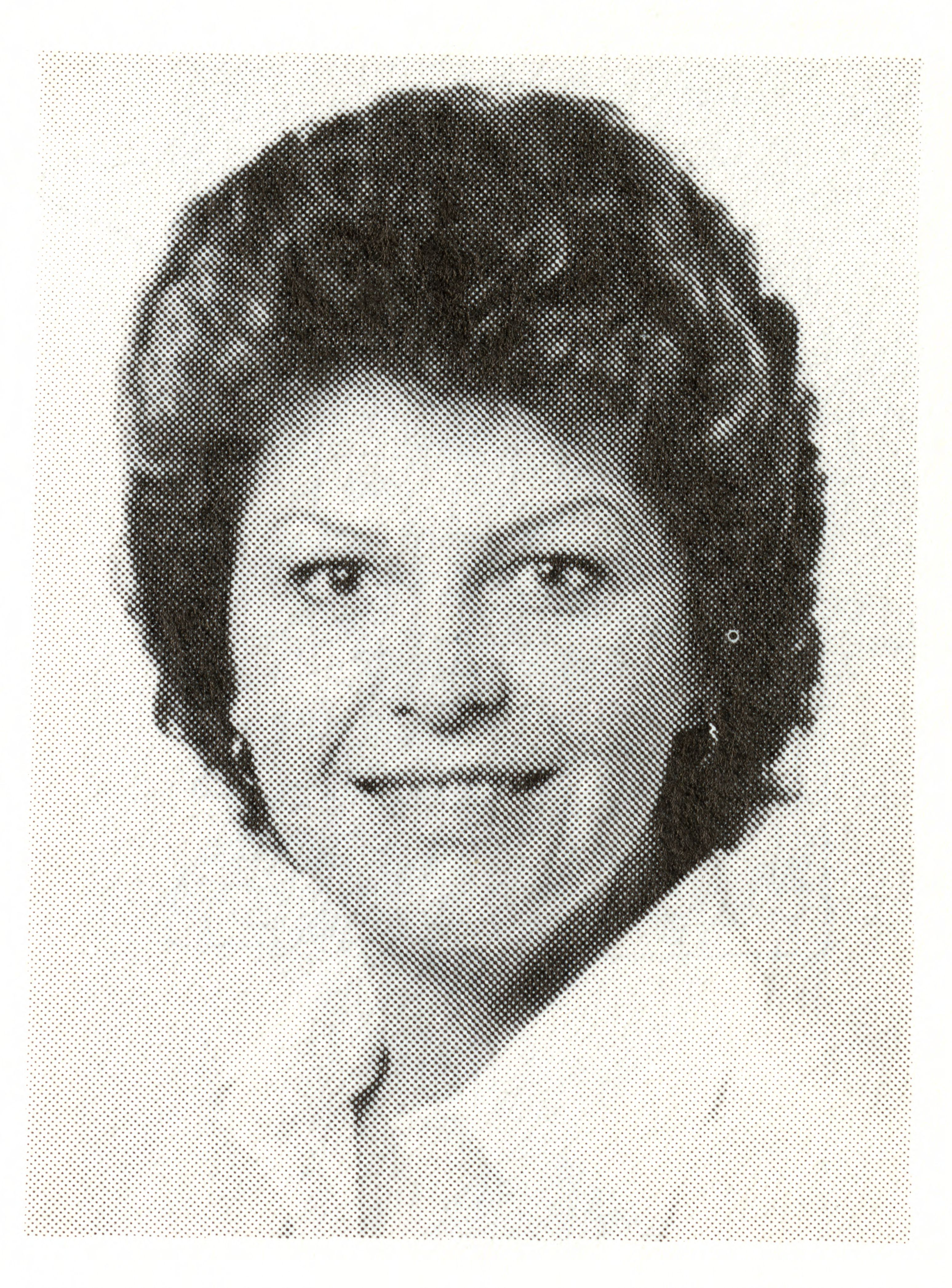
- Levi in 1981

Majority Leader of the Minnesota House of Representatives
- In office January 1985 – January 1987
- Preceded by: Harry Sieben
- Succeeded by: Robert Vanasek

Member of the Minnesota House of Representatives from the 55A district 50A (2007–2013)
- In office January 1979 – January 1987

Personal details
- Born: August 1939 (age 86–87)
- Party: Independent-Republican
- Spouse: Arlo
- Children: Todd and Julie
- Education: Augustana College; University of Oregon
- Profession: Homemaker

Constance M. "Connie" Levi (born August 1939) is a Minnesota politician who served as Minnesota House Majority Leader from 1985 to 1987. She was the first woman to serve as majority leader and the first to hold a senior leadership position in the Minnesota Legislature.

Levi was born in 1939, and attended Augustana College and the University of Oregon. She served on the Dellwood city council before being elected to the State House of Representatives in 1979. She served four terms, serving as majority leader during her last term. She did not seek re-election in 1986.

Levi went on to become president of the Minneapolis Chamber of Commerce, and served as an interim chief of staff to Minnesota Gov. Arne Carlson in 1991. She currently serves on the board of a number of index funds for Thrivent Financial and Norstan, Inc.

Connie is married to Arlo Levi, and has two children, Todd and Julie.

Political offices
| Preceded by Harry A. Sieben | Minnesota House Majority Leader; 1985-1987 | Succeeded by Robert Vanasek |
