= Alan Welle =

American politician and businessman

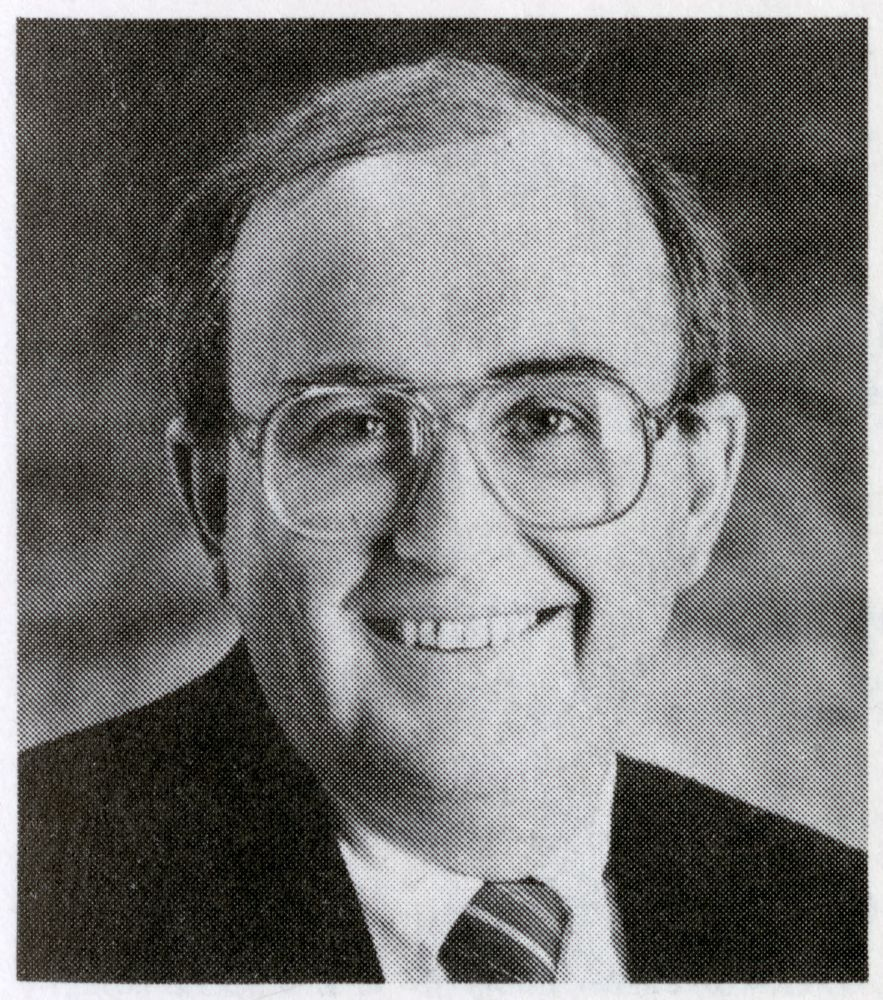
- Welle in 1991

Minnesota House Majority Leader
- In office 1992–1993
- Preceded by: Dee Long
- Succeeded by: Irv Anderson

Minnesota State Representative from District 15A
- In office 1993–1994
- Succeeded by: Tom Van Engen

Minnesota State Representative from District 15B
- In office 1983–1992
- Preceded by: Dean Johnson (politician)

Personal details
- Born: November 2, 1945 (age 80) Melrose, Minnesota
- Party: DFL
- Spouse: Laura Hoiland
- Children: Benjamin, Adam

Alan Welle (born November 2. 1945) is an American politician and businessman. He served in the Minnesota House of Representatives from 1983 to 1994 and was a Democrat. In 1991, he was elected to serve as the caucus' Majority Leader for the 1992 Legislative Session, succeeding Dee Long who would be elected as Speaker.

== Biography ==
=== Early life, education, and career ===
Welle was born in Melrose, Minnesota and graduated from Melrose Senior High School. He served in the United States Army during the Vietnam War. Welle received his bachelor's degree in business education from St. Cloud State University and a bachelor's degree in business education from the University of Minnesota. He moved to Willmar, Minnesota with his wife and family in 1975. Welle worked in the lumber industry and was taught business classes.

=== Minnesota House of Representatives ===
In 1980, Welle, then the Kandiyohi County DFL Treasurer, ran for the State House as a placeholder candidate in District 21A against incumbent Dean Johnson, losing. In 1982, Johnson retired to run for the State Senate for the newly redrawn District 15. Welle ran for the new District 15B, the northern half of Kandiyohi County, and won with 56% of the vote.

In 1983, the first term member formed an informal faction of more conservative House DFLers who sided with IRs on workers' compensation reform. In 1985, his lumber company closed and he began working at the Willmar School District's Area Learning Center.

In the 74th, 75th, 76th, and 77th Legislative Sessions, Welle served on the Health and Human Services Committee. In the 76th Session, he became chair of the Tax Laws subcommittee, and helped craft the 1987 tax omnibus bill. Beginning in the 76th Session, he served as chair of the Health and Human Services Committee until his election as Majority Leader in July 1991. As chair, he helped craft the 1991 Health Care Access bill, one of three proposals to improve healthcare coverage for the uninsured. That proposal, HF2, would be vetoed by Governor Arne Carlson. The following year, a bipartisan group known as the "Gang of Seven" worked with Carlson to create MinnesotaCare.

==== Majority Leader ====
In July 1991, Speaker of the House Bob Vanasek resigned his position effective upon the election of a successor in 1992. Majority Leader Dee Long would be elected Speaker-designate. Welle was elected as Majority Leader following a seven ballot race. As Majority Leader, Welle was chair of the Rules and Legislative Administration committee. His leadership style was described as "diplomatic" and "cooperative".

==== Phonegate ====
In March 1993, the "Phonegate" scandal erupted, in which 64 legislators and 225 staff members were found to be using state toll-free access codes for personal use. Taxpayer-funded access codes from MCI were given to legislators to conduct business without paying for long distance charges calling outside of Saint Paul.

Welle had given his son his long distance code. His nephew would also get access to it, and the code was spread further around the country. Altogether, there were $89,000 in unauthorized charges. While known before, he publicly disclosed it in March 1993 and resigned his leadership position. Afterwards, records released showed other House members had made $28,000 in unauthorized charges.

The scandal would also cripple the leadership of Speaker Long, who was not accused of any direct wrongdoing in unauthorized calls but was criticized for a lack of transparency on Welle and other legislators. Following a damaging KSTP broadcast in August 1993 about her playing golf during the 1993 NCSL conference, she lost the confidence of the caucus and would resign. Following Welle's resignation, the caucus elected Irv Anderson as Majority Leader, and following Long's resignation, as Speaker-designate. Welle would resign from the Legislature on January 4, 1994, as part of a plea agreement to lesser charges.

=== Post-Legislature ===
In 2004, Welle ran for Kandiyohi County Commissioner, losing to incumbent Dennis Peterson. In 2012, Welle ran again for County Commissioner for District 4 in Kandiyohi County, losing to Roger Imdieke. In 2014, Welle's wife Laura died. She was active civically in Willmar.

Political offices
Preceded by Dee Long	Majority Leader of the Minnesota House of Representatives; 1992-1993	Succeeded by Irv Anderson
