= Darrel Mosel =

American politician

Darrel Mosel was an American politician.

Mosel lived in Gaylord, Sibley County, Minnesota with his wife and family and was involved with agriculture. He went to St. Cloud State University for biology and environmental studies. Mosel served in the Minnesota House of Representatives in 1993 and 1994 and was a Democrat. In the 1986, 1988, and 2016 Minnesota elections, he lost the race for the Minnesota House of Representatives.
