= Irv Anderson =

American politician (1923–2008)

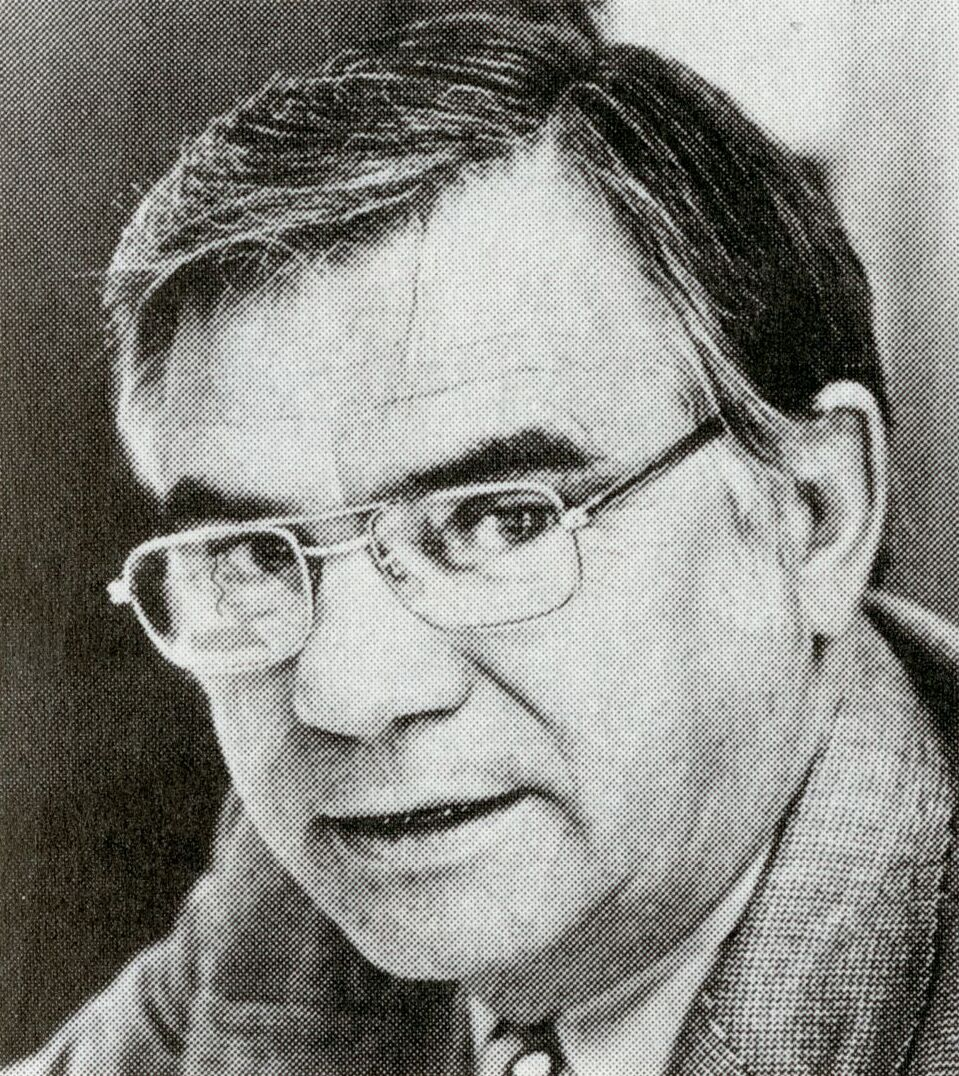
- Anderson in 1991

54th Speaker of the Minnesota House of Representatives
- In office 1993–1997
- Preceded by: Dee Long
- Succeeded by: Phil Carruthers

Minnesota House Majority Leader
- In office 1973–1981
- Preceded by: Ernest A. Lindstrom
- Succeeded by: Jerry Knickerbocker
- In office 1993
- Preceded by: Alan Welle
- Succeeded by: Phil Carruthers

Minnesota State Representative from District 3A
- In office January 1991 – January 2007
- Preceded by: Bob Neuenschwander
- Succeeded by: Tom Anzelc
- In office January 1973 – January 1983
- Succeeded by: Bob Neuenschwander

Minnesota State Representative from 64B
- In office January 1965 – January 1973
- Preceded by: Edwin J. Chilgren

Personal details
- Born: April 18, 1923 International Falls, Minnesota, U.S.
- Died: November 17, 2008 (aged 85) Coon Rapids, Minnesota, U.S.
- Party: DFL
- Spouse: Phyllis
- Children: Gregory, Cynthia
- Education: University of Minnesota
- Profession: Paper inspector, union representative, legislator, veteran

Irvin Neil Anderson (June 18, 1923 – November 17, 2008) was a Minnesota politician and member of the Minnesota House of Representatives from 1965 to 1983, and again from 1991 to 2007.

From International Falls, Anderson entered politics at approximately the same time that he was elected union president at the M & O Paper Company, the International Falls paper mill where he worked. A Democrat, he represented the old District 64 and 64B and, later, District 3A. The sprawling district included all or portions of Beltrami, Itasca, Koochiching, Lake of the Woods and St. Louis counties in the northern part of the state.

Anderson served as majority leader of the House from 1973 to 1981, and again, briefly, in 1993 before becoming Speaker of the House in September 1993, a position he held until 1997. He continued to serve in the legislature until 2007, opting not to run for re-election in 2006 due to health concerns.

Anderson fought in World War II as a United States Navy pilot from 1942 to 1945, earning the Air Medal for his performance. The Air Medal is awarded to any person who, while serving in any capacity in or with the Armed Forces of the United States, distinguishes themselves by meritorious achievement while participating in aerial flight. He also helped create Minnesota's memorial to World War II veterans.

Anderson died at Mercy Hospital in Coon Rapids on November 17, 2008. He was buried in St. Thomas Aquinas Catholic Cemetery in International Falls. On April 15, 2009, Governor Tim Pawlenty approved a bill designating U.S. Highway 53 from Virginia to International Falls as the Irv Anderson Memorial Highway.

Minnesota House of Representatives
Preceded by Edwin J. Chilgren	Member of the Minnesota House of Representatives from the 64th district 1965–1967	Succeeded by District abolished
Preceded by District created	Member of the Minnesota House of Representatives from the 64B district 1967–1973	Succeeded by Roy R. Ryan
Preceded by John S. Biersdorf	Member of the Minnesota House of Representatives from the 3A district 1973–1983	Succeeded by Bob Neuenschwander
Preceded by Bob Neuenschwander	Member of the Minnesota House of Representatives from the 3A district 1991–2007	Succeeded by Tom Anzelc
Political offices
Preceded by Ernest A. Lindstrom	Majority Leader of the Minnesota House of Representatives; 1973–1981	Succeeded by Jerry Knickerbocker
Preceded by Alan Welle	Majority Leader of the Minnesota House of Representatives; 1993	Succeeded by Phil Carruthers
Preceded by Dee Long	Speaker of the Minnesota House of Representatives; 1993–1997	Succeeded by Phil Carruthers
