= Jeff Bertram =

American politician

Member of the Minnesota House of Representatives from district 14B
- In office January 5, 1993 – January 6, 1997
- Preceded by: Becky Lourey
- Succeeded by: Doug Stang

Member of the Minnesota House of Representatives from district 16B
- In office January 6, 1987 – January 4, 1993
- Preceded by: Bernard Brinkman
- Succeeded by: David B. Gruenes

Personal details
- Born: January 24, 1960 (age 66)
- Relatives: Joe Bertram (brother)

Jeff Bertram (born January 24, 1960) is an American politician who served in the Minnesota House of Representatives from 1987 to 1997.
