= Dee Long =

American politician

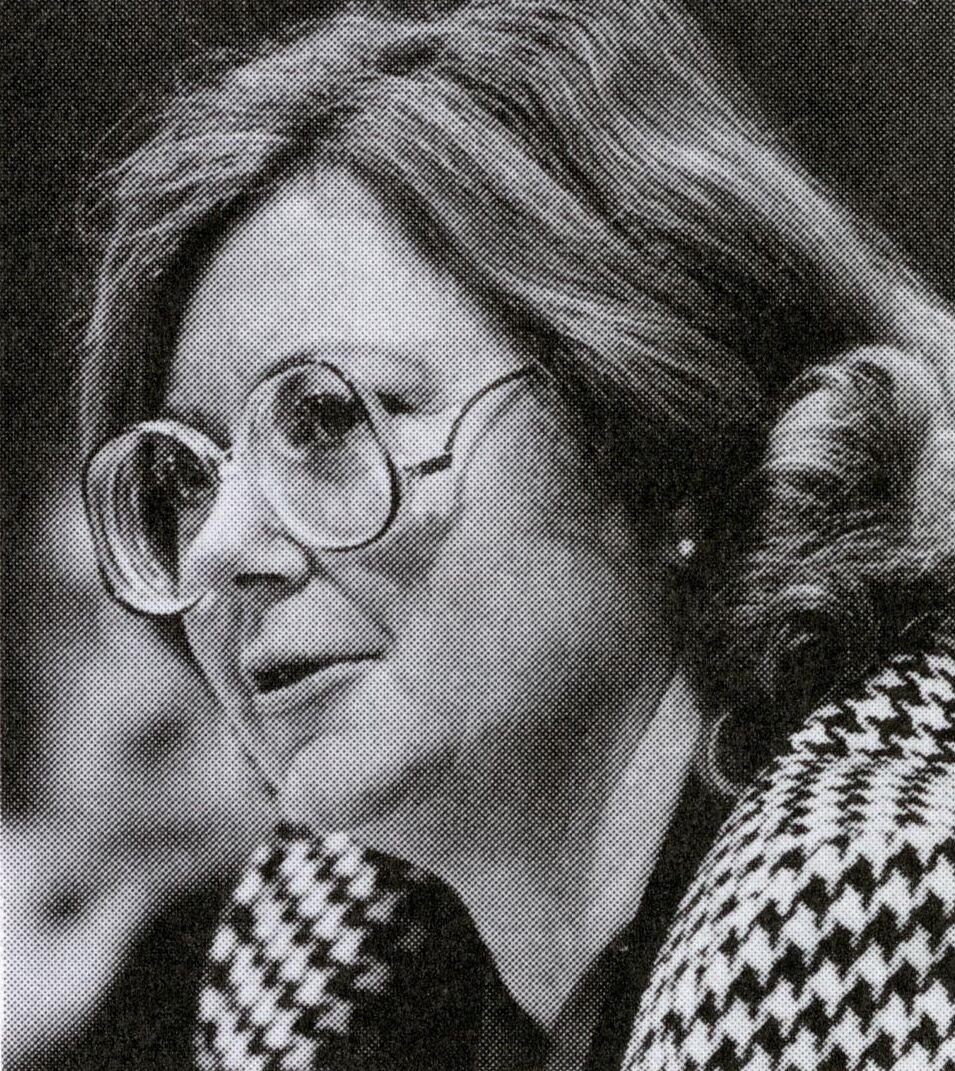
- Long in 1991

53rd Speaker of the Minnesota House of Representatives
- In office January 6, 1992 – September 15, 1993
- Preceded by: Robert Vanasek
- Succeeded by: Irv Anderson

Minnesota House Majority Leader
- In office 1989–1992
- Preceded by: Ann Wynia
- Succeeded by: Alan Welle

Minnesota State Representative from District 60A
- In office January 1993 – January 1999
- Preceded by: Karen J. Clark
- Succeeded by: Margaret Anderson Kelliher

Minnesota State Representative from District 59A
- In office January 1983 – January 1992

Minnesota State Representative from District 56B
- In office January 1979 – January 1983
- Preceded by: Thomas K. Berg

Personal details
- Born: April 1939 (age 87) Minneapolis, Minnesota
- Party: DFL
- Spouse: Nicholas
- Children: Catherine, Nicholas
- Education: Northwestern University, University of Minnesota
- Profession: College Instructor

Dee Long (born April 1939) is a Minnesota politician, a member of the Democratic-Farmer-Labor Party, and a former member of the Minnesota House of Representatives, representing part of Minneapolis. Long was the first woman to serve as Speaker of the Minnesota House of Representatives, a position she held from 1992 to 1993.

== Biography ==
=== Early life, education, and career ===
Long was born in Minneapolis to liberal Republican parents. Long attended Northwestern University before transferring to the University of Minnesota, where she graduated magna cum laude with a degree in Psychology. She became politically active in the 1960s due to the ongoing Civil Rights Movement and opposition to the Vietnam War. She began working in local Minneapolis politics such as a campaign manager for a city council candidate. She was active in women's issues, environmentalism, as a member of the Sierra Club, as well as LGBT issues.

=== Minnesota House of Representatives ===
Long first won election to the House of Representatives in 1978 with 57% of the vote, and represented districts based around the Minneapolis neighborhoods of Kenwood and Lowry Hill.

Long was the House author for the 1983 Minnesota Environmental Response and Liability Act, the state equivalent to the federal Superfund law. In 1989, Long became the first woman to chair the powerful House Tax Committee. She held that position until she was elected Majority Leader of the House DFL Caucus due to the appointment of Ann Wynia as Commissioner of the Department of Human Services.

Following the 1991 Legislative Session, Robert Vanasek resigned the Speakership to become Executive Director of the Minnesota High Technology Council. The House DFL Caucus elected Long as his successor, and she would be formally elected as the first female Speaker of the Minnesota House in January 1992.

==== Speakership ====
Long's speakership saw the Minnesota Legislature face several challenges. In January 1992, the Legislature quickly passed a legislative redistricting bill, SF 1596, following litigation the previous year. Governor Arne Carlson would veto it, and litigation over redistricting would continue until new maps were passed in 1994.

In 1993, the legislature passed a bill banning discrimination against LGBT people in housing, education, and employment. It would be signed into law on April 2, 1993.

==== Phonegate ====
In 1993, the "Phonegate" scandal erupted, in which 64 legislators and 225 staff members were found to be using state toll-free access codes for personal use. Taxpayer-funded access codes from MCI were given to legislators to conduct business without paying for long distance charges calling outside of Saint Paul.

In 1992, the Minnesota DNR's Detroit Lakes office received a bill of $57,000 in fraudulent long distance charges but it was found the codes had been stolen and employees were not responsible for the calls.

Majority Leader Alan Welle had given his son his long distance code. His nephew would also get access to it, and the code was spread further around the country. Altogether, there were $89,000 in unauthorized charges. While known before, he publicly disclosed it in March 1993 and resigned his leadership position. Afterwards, records released showed other House members had made $28,000 in unauthorized charges. Duluth Senator Sam Solon was fined $500 and had to repay $2,431 after giving his code to his ex-wife. Pine County Senator Florian Chmielewski pled guilty and was fined in 1996 to giving his code out to his family, including after rules and reporting changes for phone calls. Welle would resign from the Legislature on January 4, 1994, as part of a plea agreement to lesser charges.

In 1994, a number of legislators and staff with unauthorized charges under $200 would participate in an amnesty program to reimburse the state and avoid criminal charges from the Ramsey County Attorney.

Long was not accused of any direct wrongdoing in unauthorized calls but was criticized for a lack of transparency on Welle and other legislators.

==== KSTP Report ====
In July, legislators nationwide attended the year's National Conference of State Legislatures, including Long. She was recorded playing golf and became the subject of a critical KSTP-TV report, as the travel and lodging were taxpayer-funded. Taken with Phonegate, this proved untenable. The day after the report aired in August, Long resigned the speakership effective the next month.

==== Post-Speakership ====
Representatives Irv Anderson, Jerry Bauerly, and Ann Rest vied to replace her, with Anderson winning. Long served as chair of the then Local Government and Metropolitan Affairs Committee in the 1995-1996 session and chair of the House Taxes Committee in the 1997-1998 session. She did not run for reelection in 1998 in order to seek the DFL endorsement for Secretary of State, losing to Richfield State Representative Edwina Garcia.

=== Personal life ===
After leaving the legislature, Long lobbied for energy independence and was an active political commentator, before retiring in 2007. Long and her spouse, Nicholas, have two children. She lives in Minnetonka, Minnesota.

== See also ==
- List of female speakers of legislatures in the United States

Political offices
Preceded by Robert Vanasek	Speaker of the Minnesota House of Representatives; 1992–1993	Succeeded by Alan Welle
