= List of majority leaders of the Minnesota House of Representatives =

This is a list of majority leaders of the Minnesota House of Representatives. The position has existed since 1901. The position is typically elected by members of the majority caucus at the beginning of each biennial legislative session.

From 1913 to 1973, Minnesota state legislators were elected on nonpartisan ballots. During this period, members caucused as "Liberals" or "Conservatives".

Party/caucus	Image	Name	Took office	Left office
Republican		Winslow W. Dunn	1901	1903
Republican		George W. Wilson	1903	1905
Republican		Anton J. Rockne	1905	1909
Republican		Henry Rines	1909	1913
Conservative		William I. Nolan	1913	1915
Conservative		Thomas H. Girling	1915	1917
Conservative		Willis I. Norton	1917	1933
Liberal		John J. McDonough	1933	1935
Conservative		Roy E. Dunn	1935	1937
Liberal		Carl J. Eastvold	1937	1939
Conservative		Roy E. Dunn	1939	1955
Liberal		Frederick A. Cina	1955	1963
Conservative		Aubrey W. Dirlam	1963	1971
Republican		Ernest A. Lindstrom	1971	1973
Democratic–Farmer–Labor		Irv Anderson (Note: From 1979 to 1980, the House was evenly divided. Irv Anderson served as leader of the DFL caucus.)	1973	1981
Independent-Republican		Jerry Knickerbocker (Note: From 1979 to 1980, the House was evenly divided. Jerry Knickerbocker served as leader of the I-R caucus.)	1979	1980
Democratic–Farmer–Labor		Willis R. Eken	1981	1984
Democratic–Farmer–Labor		Harry Sieben (Note: Willis R. Eken resigned as majority leader in 1984. Rather than elect a new majority leader, House Speaker Harry Sieben appointed himself majority leader as well.)	1984	1985
Independent-Republican		Connie Levi	1985	1987
Democratic–Farmer–Labor		Robert Vanasek	1987	1987
Democratic–Farmer–Labor		Ann Wynia	1987	1989
Democratic–Farmer–Labor		Dee Long	1989	1992
Democratic–Farmer–Labor		Alan Welle	1992	1993
Democratic–Farmer–Labor		Irv Anderson	1993	1993
Democratic–Farmer–Labor		Phil Carruthers	1993	1997
Democratic–Farmer–Labor		Ted Winter	1997	1999
Republican		Tim Pawlenty	1999	2003
Republican		Erik Paulsen	2003	2007
Democratic–Farmer–Labor		Tony Sertich	2007	2011
Republican		Matt Dean	2011	2013
Democratic–Farmer–Labor		Erin Murphy	2013	2015
Republican		Joyce Peppin	2015	2018 (Note: Joyce Peppin resigned in July 2018. As the House did not meet after that time, the position was vacant until the next session began in January 2019.)
Democratic–Farmer–Labor		Ryan Winkler	2019	2023
Democratic–Farmer–Labor		Jamie Long	2023	2025
Republican		Harry Niska	2025	2025
		(Vacant) (Note: Evenly divided House.)	2025	present
