= Jerry Knickerbocker =

American politician and businessman

Minnesota House Majority Leader
- In office 1979–1980
- Preceded by: Irv Anderson
- Succeeded by: Irv Anderson

Member of the Minnesota House of Representatives
- In office 1973–1994

Personal details
- Born: October 20, 1943 (age 82) Cloquet, Minnesota
- Party: Independent-Republican

Gerald C. "Jerry" Knickerbocker (born October 20, 1943) was an American politician and businessman.

Knickerbocker was born in Cloquet, Carlton County, Minnesota and graduated from Cloquet High School. He received his bachelor's degree in business administration and economics from the University of Minnesota. Knickerbocker lived in Hopkins, Minnesota with his wife and family and was involved in the real estate and insurance businesses. He served in the Minnesota House of Representatives from 1973 to 1994 and was a Republican. From 1979-1980, Knickerbocker served as Minnesota House Majority Leader alongside Irv Anderson, while the house was evenly divided.

Political offices
Preceded by Irv Anderson	Majority Leader of the Minnesota House of Representatives; 1979-1980	Succeeded by Irv Anderson
