= Phil Carruthers =

American politician

55th Speaker of the Minnesota House of Representatives
- In office January 1997 – January 1999
- Preceded by: Irv Anderson
- Succeeded by: Steve Sviggum

Minnesota House Majority Leader
- In office 1993 – January 1997
- Preceded by: Irv Anderson
- Succeeded by: Ted Winter

Minnesota State Representative for District 47B
- In office January 1987 – January 2001
- Preceded by: Robert L. Ellingson
- Succeeded by: Debra Hilstrom

Personal details
- Born: December 8, 1953 (age 72) England
- Party: Democratic-Farmer-Labor
- Children: Alex and Rory
- Education: University of Minnesota; University of Minnesota Law School
- Profession: Attorney

Phil Carruthers (born December 8, 1953) is a former American judge and Minnesota politician and former member and Speaker of the Minnesota House of Representatives. He is also the former director of the Civil Division at the Ramsey County Attorney's Office. On September 14, 2011, Governor Mark Dayton appointed Carruthers as a judge to the Minnesota Fourth District Court.

Carruthers came to Minnesota in 1961 with his parents, who were Canadian citizens. He graduated from St. Anthony Village High School and the University of Minnesota before attending the University of Minnesota Law School. He worked for several years as an attorney before seeking public office. He also served on the Metropolitan Council from 1983 to 1986. He won election to the House in 1986 from Brooklyn Center, representing District 47B, which included portions of Hennepin County. He also maintained a private practice and served as prosecutor for the city of Shorewood during this same time period.

While in the House, Carruthers served as chair of the Metropolitan Affairs Subcommittee on Government Structure, the Local Government and Metropolitan Affairs Subcommittee on Metro Affairs, the Judiciary Subcommittee on Data Privacy, the Rules and Legislative Administration Committee, and the Rules and Legislative Administration Subcommittee on Administration.

In 1993, Carruthers was chosen to be Majority Leader when Irv Anderson became Speaker. He served as majority leader during the next two legislative sessions and became chair of the Rules and Legislative Administration Committee. When Anderson stepped down from the House leadership in 1997, Carruthers succeeded him as Speaker. He remained in that position until 1999, when the DFL majority was defeated by the Republican Party, and Steve Sviggum succeeded him as Speaker. He served one more term in the House before retiring in 2001.

Political offices
Preceded by Irv Anderson	Speaker of the Minnesota House of Representatives; 1997–1999	Succeeded by Steve Sviggum
Preceded by Irv Anderson	Minnesota House Majority Leader; 1993–1997	Succeeded by Ted Winter
