= Alice Hausman =

American politician (born 1942)

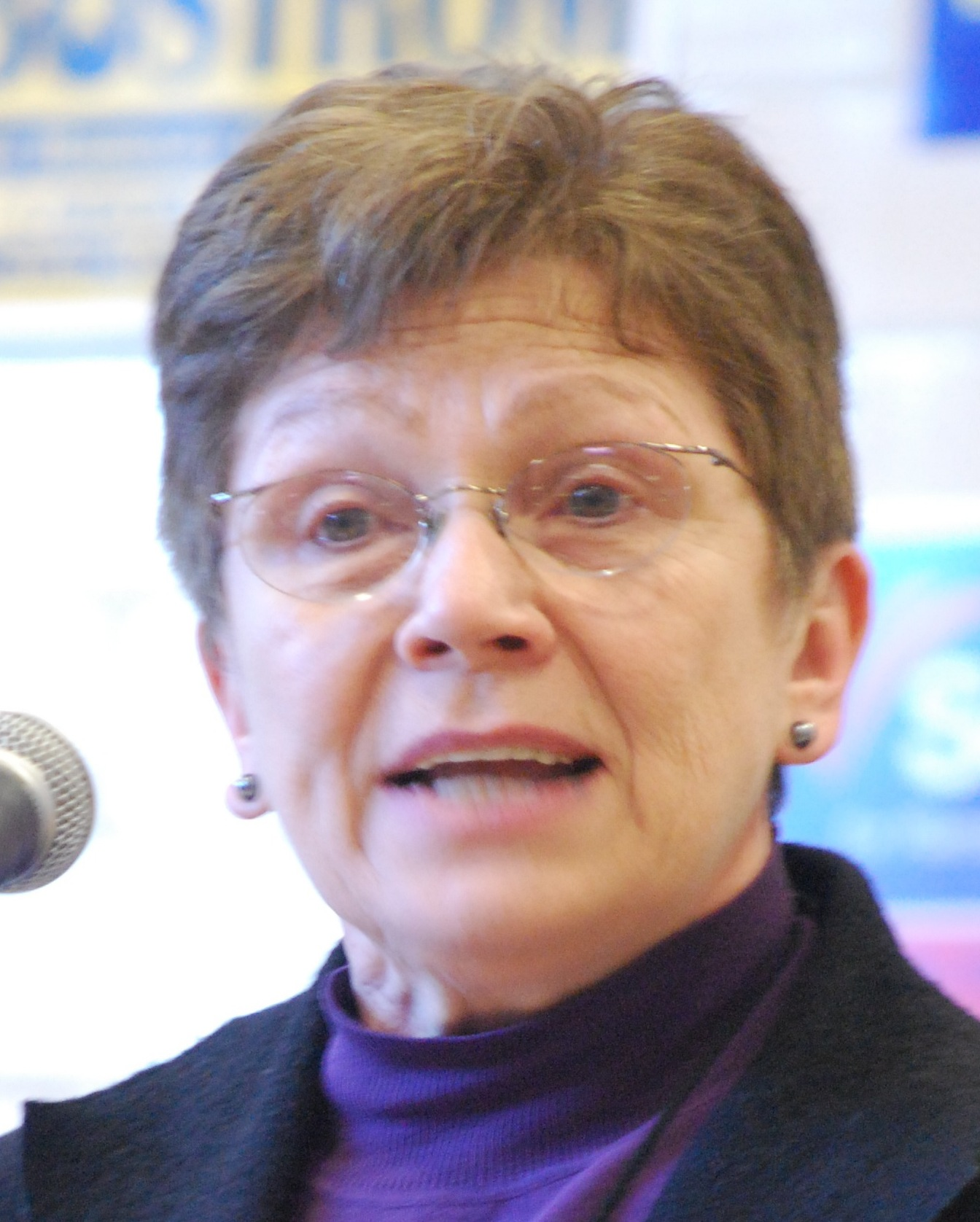
- Hausman in 2010

Member of the Minnesota House of Representatives from the 66A district 63B (1989–1993), 66B (1993–2013), 66A(2013-2023)
- In office November 22, 1989 – January 3, 2023
- Preceded by: Ann Wynia
- Succeeded by: Leigh Finke

Personal details
- Born: July 31, 1942 (age 84) Bremen, Kansas
- Party: Minnesota Democratic–Farmer–Labor Party
- Spouse: Robert
- Children: 2
- Education: Concordia College Nebraska; Concordia College Chicago
- Occupation: legislator, educator

Alice Hausman (born July 31, 1942) is a Minnesota politician and former member of the Minnesota House of Representatives. As a member of the Minnesota Democratic–Farmer–Labor Party (DFL), she represented District 66A, which includes portions of the city of Saint Paul in Ramsey County, which is part of the Twin Cities metropolitan area. She is also a retired educator.

== Education ==
Hausman graduated from Concordia College in Seward, Nebraska with a B.S. in Education, and then went on to Concordia College in River Forest, Illinois, earning her M.A. degree in Education.

== Minnesota House of Representatives ==
Hausman was first elected in a 1989 special election after Rep. Ann Wynia resigned to accept an appointment by Governor Rudy Perpich as Commissioner of the Minnesota Department of Human Services. She has been re-elected every two years since then. Prior to the 1992 legislative redistricting, her district was known as 63B. She represented District 66B from 1993 to 2013. Due to redistricting, Hausman was forced to run for re-election in district 66A in 2012. She won re-election with about 63% of the vote.

== Personal life ==
Hausman moved to Saint Paul in 1977. She has two children and is a Lutheran.
