= Becky Kelso =

American politician

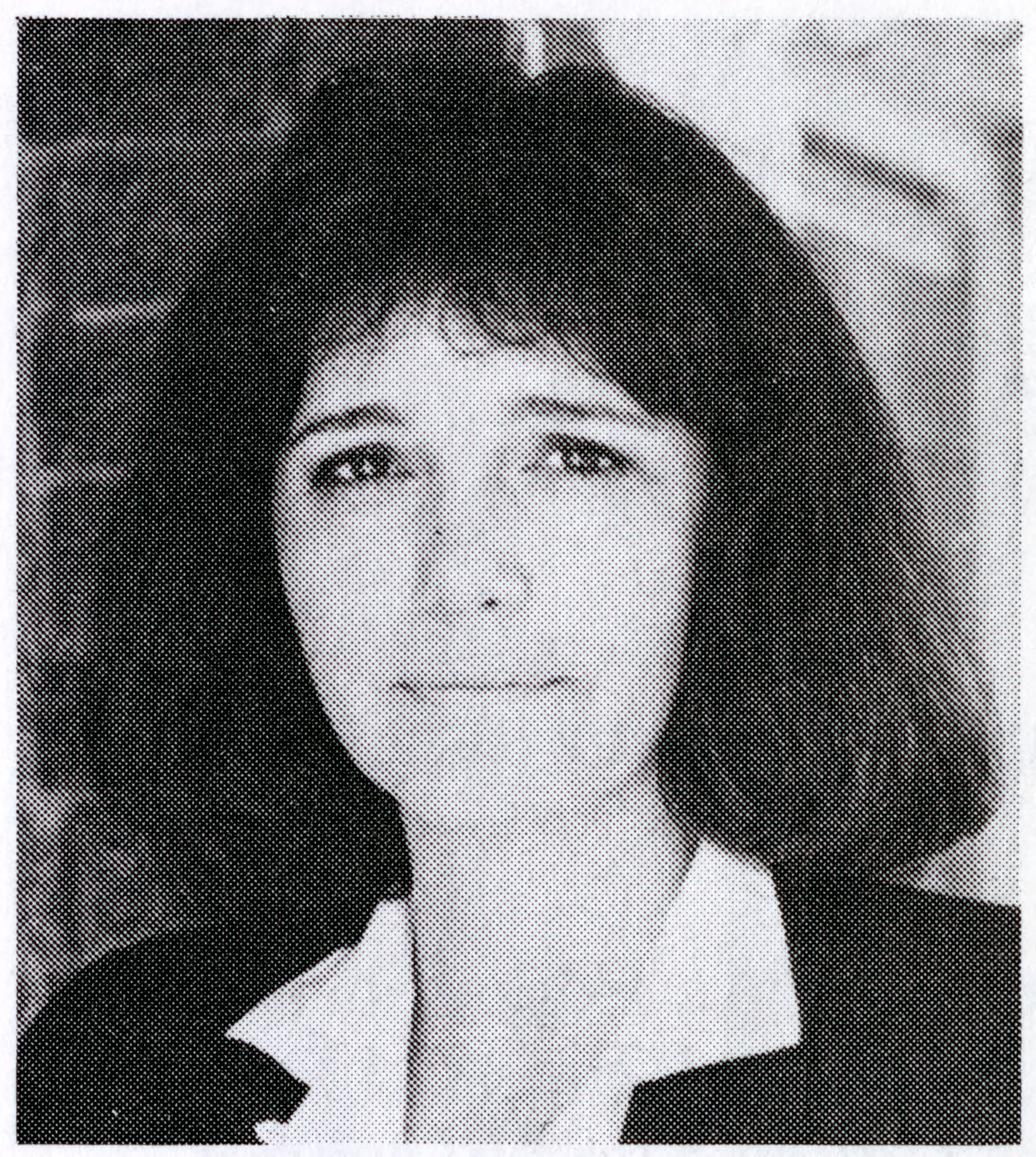

Member of the Minnesota House of Representatives from district 35B
- In office January 5, 1993 – January 4, 1999
- Preceded by: Larry Bodahl
- Succeeded by: Mark Buesgens

Member of the Minnesota House of Representatives from district 36A
- In office January 6, 1987 – January 4, 1993
- Preceded by: Chuck Dimler
- Succeeded by: Eileen Tompkins

Personal details
- Born: August 1948 (age 77)
- Party: Democratic

Becky Kelso (born August 1948) is an American politician who served in the Minnesota House of Representatives from 1987 to 1999.
