= Joe Bertram (Minnesota politician) =

American politician (born 1954)

Member of the Minnesota Senate from the 14th district
- In office January 5, 1993 – January 9, 1996
- Preceded by: Florian Chmielewski
- Succeeded by: Michelle Fischbach

Member of the Minnesota Senate from the 16th district
- In office January 6, 1981 – January 4, 1993
- Preceded by: Ben Omann
- Succeeded by: Joanne Benson

Personal details
- Born: July 3, 1954 (age 72) Stearns County, Minnesota, U.S.
- Party: Minnesota Democratic–Farmer–Labor Party
- Spouse: Mary Lee Imdieke
- Relations: Jeff Bertram (brother)
- Children: three
- Education: St. Cloud State University, Bemidji State University
- Occupation: farmer

Joe Bertram, Sr. (born July 3, 1954) is an American politician who served in the Minnesota Senate from 1981 to 1996 as (DFL) State Senator from Paynesville in District 14.

Bertram was accused of shoplifting a leather vest and trying to bribe the store owner into not reporting it in 1996. His brother, State Representative Jeff Bertram then began threatening people to not report other behaviors by his brother, for which Jeff Bertram was Censured. The Senate was beginning expulsion talks for Joe Bertram when pled guilty and resigned.
