= Ted Winter =

American politician

Member of the Minnesota House of Representatives from the 28A, 22A district
- In office January 6, 1987 – January 6, 2003
- Preceded by: Carol Dyke
- Succeeded by: Doug Magnus

Minnesota House Majority Leader
- In office January 7, 1997 – January 4, 1999
- Preceded by: Phil Carruthers
- Succeeded by: Tim Pawlenty

Personal details
- Born: November 26, 1949 (age 76)
- Party: Minnesota Democratic-Farmer-Labor Party
- Spouse: Marge
- Children: 4
- Education: Worthington Community College
- Occupation: Farmer, insurance agent, legislator

Theodore J. "Ted" Winter (born November 26, 1949) is a Minnesota politician and a former member of the Minnesota House of Representatives from southwestern Minnesota. First elected in 1986 in the Democratic-Farmer-Labor Party's "firestorm" that swept through the region, giving Democrats unprecedented control of southwestern Minnesota for the next several election cycles, Winter served eight terms. He was re-elected in 1988, 1990, 1992, 1994, 1996, 1998 and 2000. He represented the old District 28A and, later, District 22A, which included all or portions of Cottonwood, Jackson, Lyon, Murray, Nobles and Redwood counties, changing somewhat through redistricting in 1992.

== Background and education ==
From the small farm town of Fulda, Winter graduated from Fulda High School in 1967, then went on to Worthington Community College in Worthington, graduating in 1970. He and his family maintain a farm in Nobles County just outside Fulda.

== Advocate for farmers and legislative leadership ==
A farmer himself, Winter earned a reputation as a strong advocate for farmers and agricultural issues during his time in office. He had also been an advocate of the somewhat militant Groundswell movement in the mid-1980s in its quest to bring political and social change on behalf of the region's farmers.

While in the legislature, Winter was a member of the House Agriculture, Economic Development, Environment and Natural Resources, Financial Institutions and Insurance, Governmental Operations, Insurance, Local and Urban Affairs, Rules and Legislative Administration, Taxes, Transportation and Transit, and Ways and Means committees, and of various sub-committees relevant to each area. He served as majority leader during the 1997–1999 biennium under House Speaker Phil Carruthers.

== Service to the Minnesota Farmer's Union ==
In 1998, Winter appeared before the United States House Committee on Agriculture to testify on behalf of the National Farmer's Union regarding the state of the agricultural economy. He ran for president of the Minnesota branch of the organization in 2002, losing to former Minnesota state representative Doug Peterson.

After his service in the legislature concluded, Winter took a position in Windom as an agent with the Minnesota Farmer's Union, which is a non-profit membership-based organization that works to protect and enhance the economic interests and quality of life of family farmers and ranchers and rural communities.

== 2010 House campaign ==
On June 1, 2010, Winter filed for the open House seat in District 22A, seeking to regain the position he lost to outgoing Rep. Doug Magnus in 2002. In announcing his candidacy, Winter stated he believed his "leadership abilities and past experience can make a real difference next year as we face another deep budget deficit," adding that he was "especially concerned that rural Minnesota be treated equitably" and "should not be expected to bear more than our fair share of budget cuts." He was unsuccessful in his comeback bid, losing the November 2, 2010, general election to Republican newcomer Joe Schomacker of Luverne.

Political offices
Preceded by Phil Carruthers	Minnesota House Majority Leader; 1997–1999	Succeeded by Tim Pawlenty
