= Bob Vanasek =

American politician

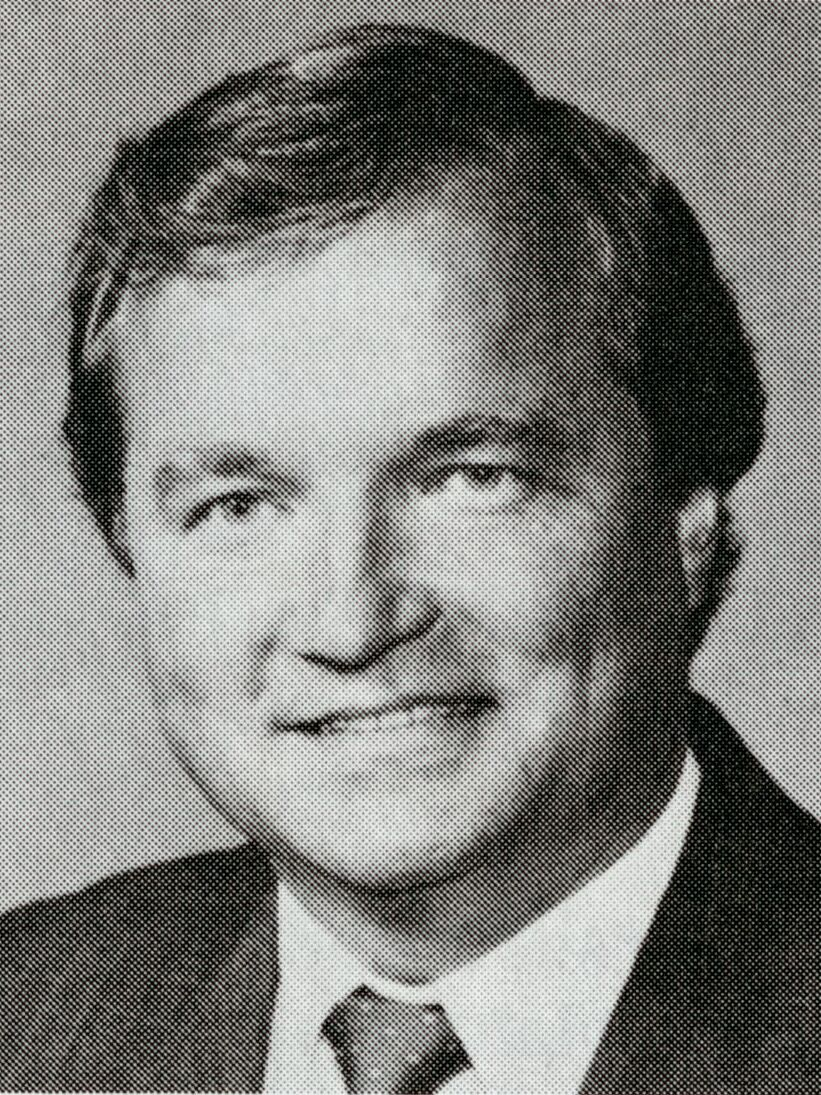
- Vanasek in 1991

52nd Speaker of the Minnesota House of Representatives
- In office June 25, 1987 – January 6, 1992
- Preceded by: Fred Norton
- Succeeded by: Dee Long

Minnesota State Representative from District 25A
- In office January 1983 – January 1993
- Preceded by: Douglas W. Carlson
- Succeeded by: Kay Brown

Minnesota State Representative from District 24A
- In office January 1973 – January 1983
- Preceded by: Delbert F. Anderson
- Succeeded by: Mark J. Piepho

Minnesota House Majority Leader
- In office 1987–1987
- Preceded by: Connie Levi
- Succeeded by: Ann Wynia

Personal details
- Born: April 2, 1949 (age 77) New Prague, Minnesota, U.S.
- Party: DFL
- Spouse: Mary Vanasek
- Children: 3
- Education: University of Minnesota; John F. Kennedy School of Government; William Mitchell College of Law
- Profession: Public relations, lobbyist

Robert E. "Bob" Vanasek (born April 2, 1949) is a Minnesota politician and a former member and Speaker of the Minnesota House of Representatives. A Democrat, he was first elected to the House in 1972 at just 23 years of age, and was re-elected every two years from 1974 to 1990. He represented the old districts 24A and 25A, which included portions of Dakota, Le Sueur, Rice and Scott counties in the southeastern part of the state.

== Education background ==
Vanasek graduated from New Prague High School in New Prague, and received a B.A. in political science from the University of Minnesota. He went on to receive his M.A. in public administration from the John F. Kennedy School of Government at Harvard University in 1985 through a Bush Foundation Fellowship. He also attended William Mitchell College of Law in Saint Paul.

== Legislative and professional leadership ==
While in the legislature, Vanasek served as chair of the House Criminal Justice and Judiciary committees, the Rules and Legislative Administration Committee, and the Ways and Means Committee. He was an assistant majority leader from 1979 to 1985, and, briefly, majority leader in 1987.

Vanasek became Speaker in 1987, after the resignation of Fred Norton, who was appointed to the Minnesota Court of Appeals by Governor Rudy Perpich. He served as Speaker until 1992, when he left the legislature to become executive director of the Minnesota High Technology Council, a private organization, until 1995. He was vice president of public affairs at Metropolitan State University from 1995 to 1999.

Vanasek has run Robert Vanasek & Associates since 1999, and is currently a lobbyist for a variety of organizations. He is also a member of the board of directors of Minnesota's Private Colleges.

== Honorary consul of the Czech Republic ==
Vanasek was installed as the new honorary consul of the Czech Republic for the four-state area of Minnesota, Iowa, North Dakota and South Dakota on September 19, 2009, by Czech Ambassador Petr Kolar. The Czech Republic maintains 14 consulates in the United States, and 166 worldwide. The Czech honorary consulate joins some 30 other such honorary and official consulates with jurisdiction in the state of Minnesota.

Political offices
Preceded by Fred Norton	Speaker of the Minnesota House of Representatives; 1987–1992	Succeeded by Dee Long
Preceded by Douglas W. Carlson	State Representative from Minnesota District 25A; 1983–1993	Succeeded by Kay Brown
Preceded by Delbert F. Anderson	State Representative from Minnesota District 24A; 1973–1983	Succeeded by Mark J. Piepho
Preceded by Connie Levi	Minnesota House Majority Leader; 1987	Succeeded by Ann Wynia
