= Steve Sviggum =

American politician

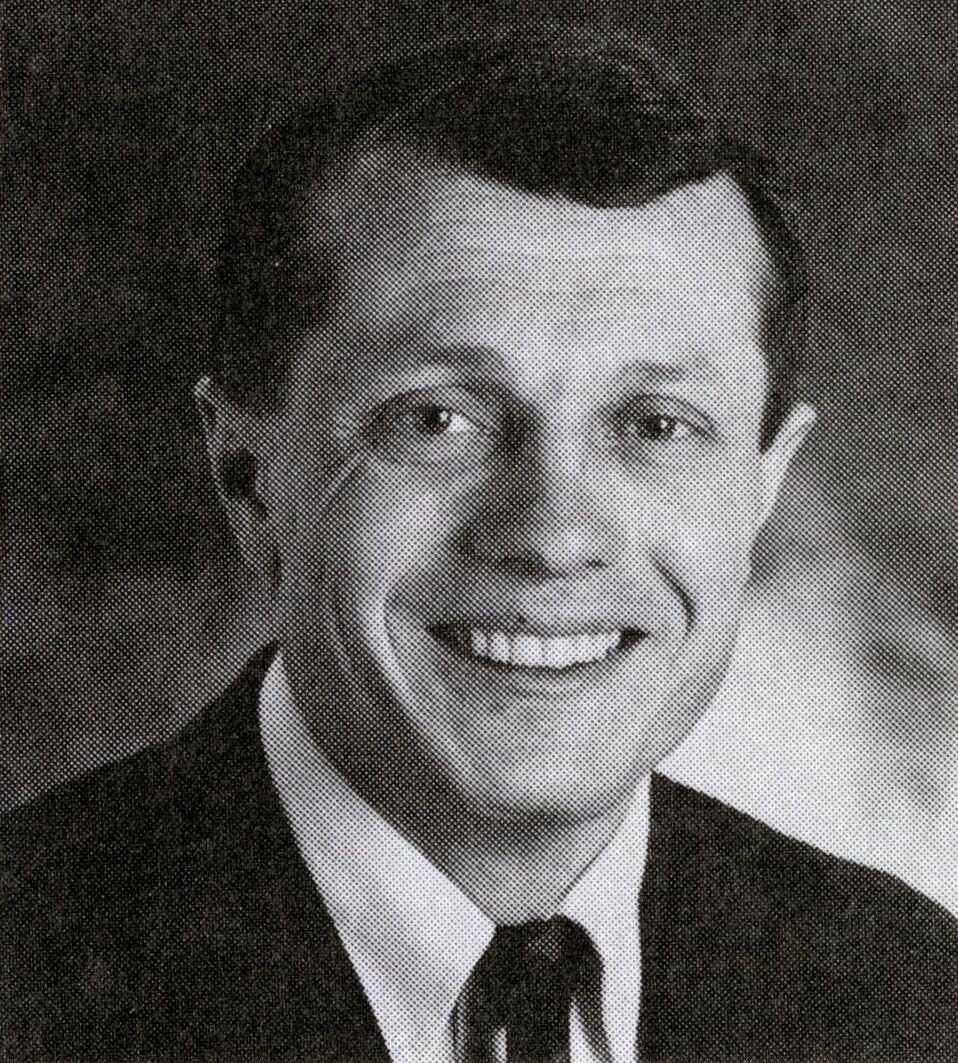

56th Speaker of the Minnesota House of Representatives
- In office January 5, 1999 – January 3, 2007
- Preceded by: Phil Carruthers
- Succeeded by: Margaret Anderson Kelliher

Minnesota House Minority Leader
- In office April 17, 1992 – January 5, 1999
- Preceded by: Terry Dempsey
- Succeeded by: Tom Pugh

Member of the Minnesota House of Representatives from the 28B, 26A, 25A district
- In office January 3, 1979 – July 17, 2007
- Preceded by: James F. White
- Succeeded by: Steve Drazkowski

Personal details
- Born: September 15, 1951 (age 75) Minnesota
- Party: Independent-Republican; Republican
- Spouse: Debra
- Children: 3
- Education: St. Olaf College
- Profession: Educator, farmer, regent, legislator

Steven A. Sviggum (born September 15, 1951) is a Minnesota politician, a former member of the University of Minnesota Board of Regents, and an executive assistant to and communications director for the Republican caucus in the Minnesota Senate. A former Speaker and member of the Minnesota House of Representatives, Sviggum represented District 28B in the southeastern part of the state. The area was known as District 25A until the 1982 legislative redistricting, and then as District 26A until the 1992 redistricting, and has included all or portions of Dakota, Dodge, Goodhue, Olmsted, Steele, Wabasha, Waseca and Winona counties.

== Background ==
Of Norwegian-American ancestry, Sviggum was born in September 1951. He received a B.A. in mathematics from St. Olaf College in Northfield, and later worked as both a teacher and a farmer.

== Service and leadership in the Minnesota House ==
Sviggum was first elected to the House in 1978. He served as minority leader from April 17, 1992 to 1999, and became Speaker after the 1998 elections, when the Republicans took control of the House. He began his speakership under unusual circumstances, as 1998 also saw the election of Reform Party candidate Jesse Ventura as governor while the Democrats retained control of the Minnesota Senate. Sviggum was the leader of the Republicans in a government divided among three political parties.

In 2003 Sviggum alleged that then-State Representative Rebecca Otto had knowingly distributed false campaign materials. Otto was indicted, but the presiding judge dismissed the charges.

In the 2006 election, the Democrats regained control of the House, ending Sviggum's tenure as Speaker. Though he won reelection to his House seat, he chose not seek a leadership position in the next session. Democrat Margaret Anderson Kelliher succeeded him as Speaker.

== State commissioner ==
On June 26, 2007, Governor Tim Pawlenty announced that Sviggum would succeed Scott Brenner as Minnesota Commissioner of Labor and Industry. He resigned from his House seat and took over the position on July 17, 2007, serving until December 2010. A special election held on August 7, 2007, to determine Sviggum's successor was won by Republican Steve Drazkowski of Wabasha.

On December 2, 2010, in the waning days of the Pawlenty administration, Sviggum was appointed Commissioner of the Minnesota Management and Budget Office, the department responsible for preparing budget proposals for the governor. He served just over a month, leaving office with Pawlenty on January 3, 2011.

== University of Minnesota regent ==
Sviggum and former Representative Laura Brod were elected to the University of Minnesota's Board of Regents on February 21, 2011, by a joint meeting of the Minnesota House and Senate. He was to serve a six-year term on the 12-member body, which is charged with overseeing the University of Minnesota system, but resigned one year into his term, after the Board found that his position as chief spokesman for the Senate Republican Caucus constituted an "unmanageable conflict of interest". Sviggum was later elected to a 2017-2023 term.

In 2022, Sviggum suggested that the University of Minnesota Morris might be "too diverse". He said that two of his friends' children had not gone to Morris because they "just didn't feel comfortable there".

Morris has a little over 1,000 students, of whom 54% are white and 41% are Black, Indigenous, and people of color. When asked for a response to criticism of his remarks, he replied, "I was just asking a question. I'm sorry some feel the question might be offensive."

== Work with Minnesota senate ==
On January 16, 2012, Sviggum was named communications director and executive assistant for the Republican caucus in the Minnesota Senate. Sviggum replaced Michael Brodkorb, who had resigned in the wake of a scandal involving former Senate Majority Leader Amy Koch. Sviggum was criticized for his intention to remain a regent during his tenure with the Senate. Senate Minority Leader Tom Bakk said he believed holding both positions was a conflict of interest.

Sviggum admitted that taxpayers should not have paid for pamphlets created by the Minnesota Senate Republican communications department and used by 15 Republican Senators for Republican attendees of precinct caucuses. He publicly apologized for using taxpayer's resources to produce campaign materials.

On June 11, 2012, the Minnesota Office of Administrative Hearings ruled that sufficient evidence existed for a complaint the Minnesota DFL Party filed against Sviggum and 14 Republican Senators regarding the pamphlets to continue. The complaint against Senator Doug Magnus was dismissed.

Preceded by Phil Carruthers	Speaker of the Minnesota House of Representatives; 1999–2007	Succeeded by Margaret Anderson Kelliher
