= Edwina Garcia =

American politician (born 1944)

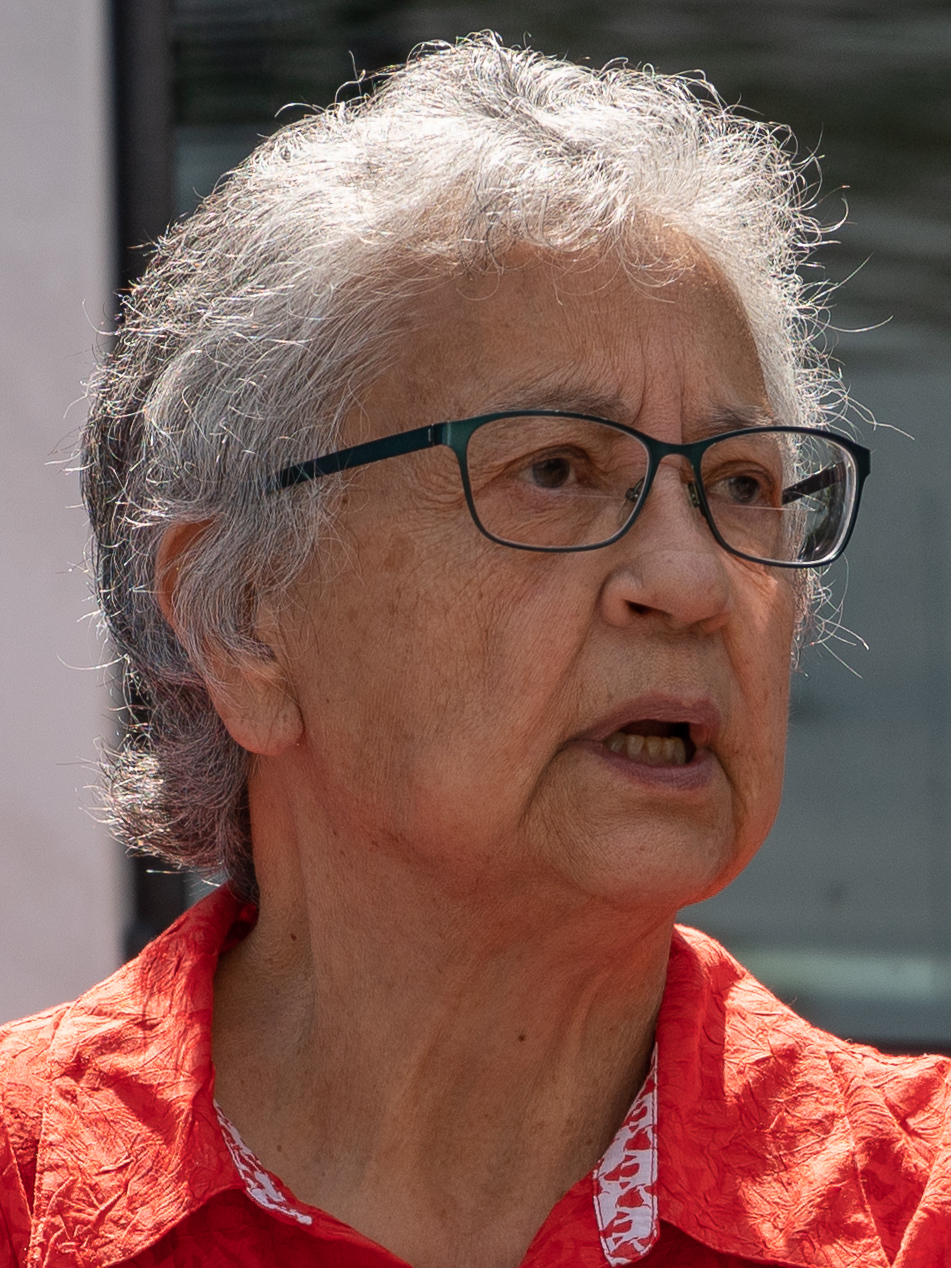
- Garcia in 2020

Member of the Minnesota House of Representatives from the 63B district
- In office 1993–1998

Member of the Minnesota House of Representatives from the 40A district
- In office 1991–1992

Personal details
- Born: December 8, 1944 (age 81) Clovis, New Mexico, U.S.
- Party: Minnesota Democratic–Farmer–Labor Party
- Spouse: Joe Garcia
- Children: 1
- Education: University of Minnesota
- Occupation: counselor

Edwina Garcia (born December 8, 1944) is an American politician in the state of Minnesota.

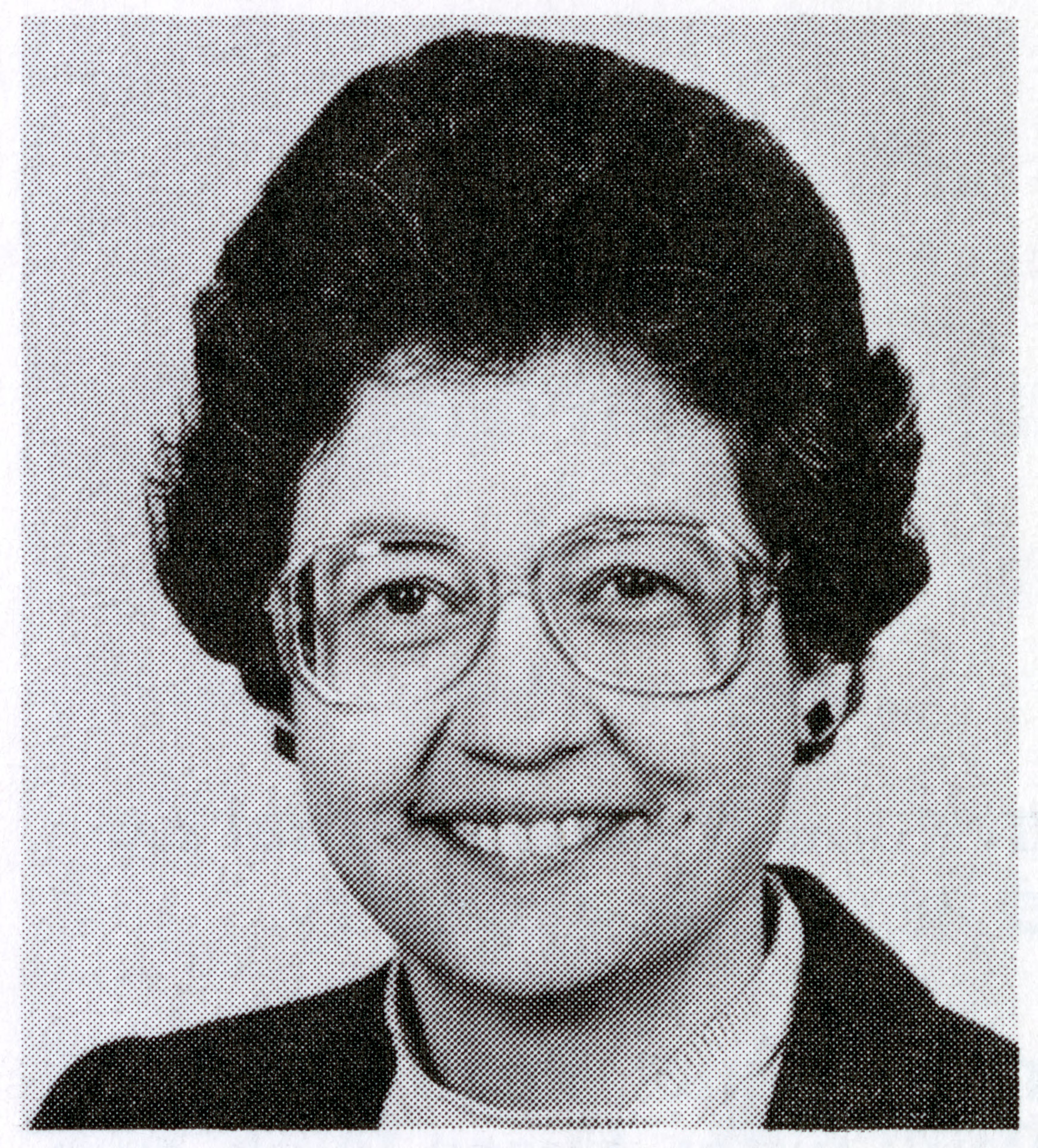
Portrait of Minnesota Representative Edwina Garcia, 1991-1992 Legislative Session.

Garcia was born in Clovis, New Mexico. She went to University of Minnesota. Garcia served on the Richfield, Minnesota City Council. She served in the Minnesota House of Representatives.

Party political offices
Preceded by Joan Growe	Democratic nominee for Minnesota Secretary of State; 1998	Succeeded by Hubert Humphrey IV
