= 79th Minnesota Legislature =

1995 to 1996 legislative session

Seventy-ninth Minnesota Legislature
| ← | 78th Minnesota Legislature | 80th Minnesota Legislature | → |
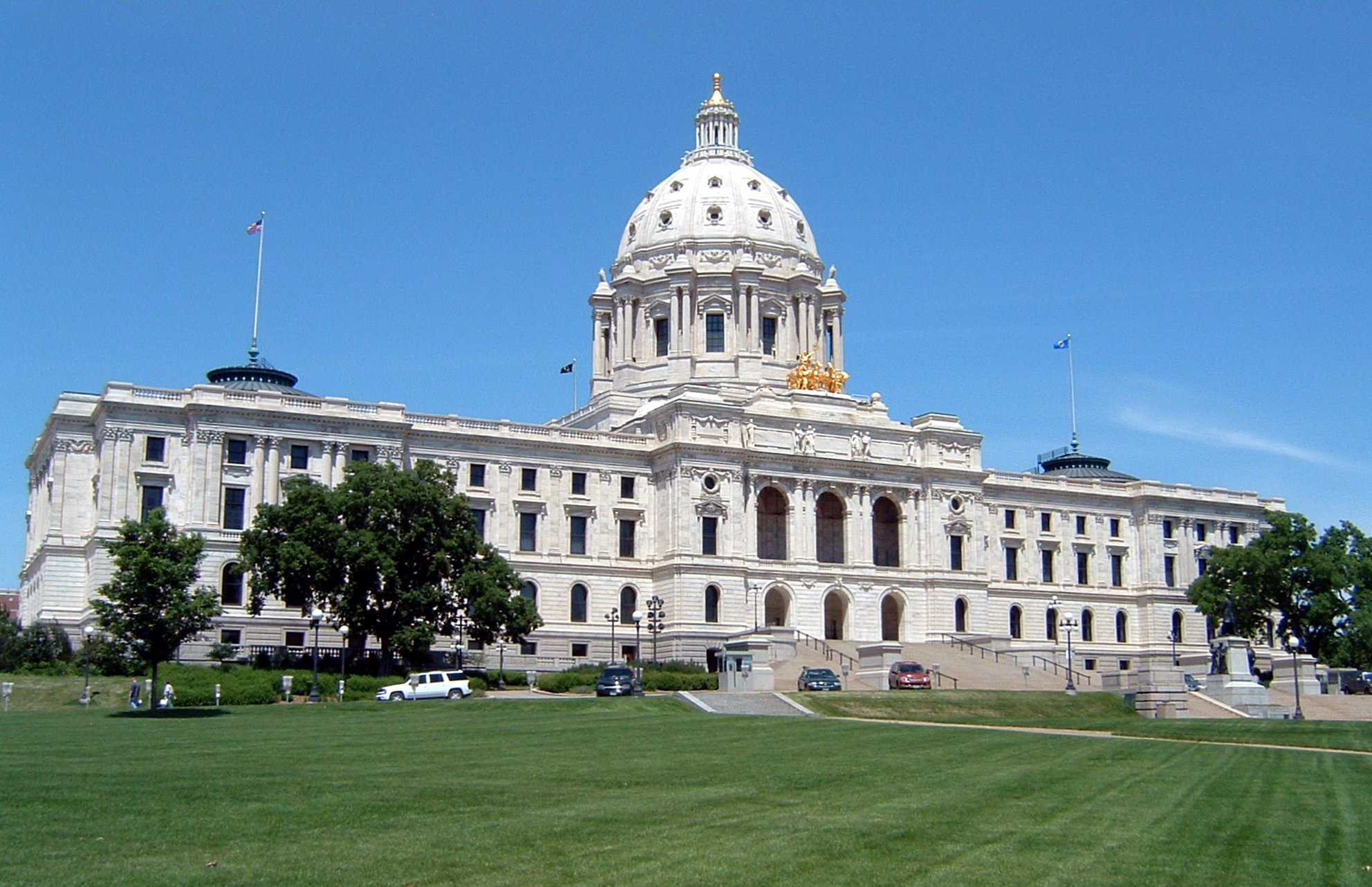

Overview
- Legislative body: Minnesota Legislature
- Jurisdiction: Minnesota, United States
- Meeting place: Minnesota State Capitol
- Term: January 3, 1995 – January 7, 1997
- Website: www.leg.state.mn.us

Minnesota State Senate
- Members: 67 Senators
- President: Allan Spear
- Majority Leader: Roger Moe
- Minority Leader: Dean Johnson
- Party control: Democratic-Farmer-Labor Party

Minnesota House of Representatives
- Members: 134 Representatives
- Speaker: Irv Anderson
- Majority Leader: Phil Carruthers
- Minority Leader: Steve Sviggum
- Party control: Democratic-Farmer-Labor Party

The seventy-ninth Minnesota Legislature first convened on January 3, 1995. The 67 members of the Minnesota Senate were elected during the general election of November 3, 1992, and the 134 members of the Minnesota House of Representatives were elected during the general election of November 8, 1994.

== Sessions ==
The legislature met in a regular session from January 3, 1995, to May 22, 1995. A special session convened from May 23, 1995, to May 25, 1995, to consider funding for K-12 schools and other unfinished business.

A continuation of the regular session was held between January 16, 1996, and April 3, 1996.

== Party summary ==
Resignations and new members are discussed in the "Membership changes" section, below. On September 23, 1995, the Independent Republican Party changed its name back to the Republican Party.

=== Senate ===
| | Party (Shading indicates majority caucus) | | | Total | Vacant |
| | DFL | Ind | IR | Total | Vacant |
|---|---|---|---|---|---|
| End of previous Legislature | 43 | 0 | 24 | 67 | 0 |
| Begin | 43 | 0 | 24 | 67 | 0 |
| January 3, 1995 | 43 | 0 | 23 | 66 | 1 |
| February 13, 1995 | 43 | 0 | 24 | 67 | 0 |
| January 9, 1996 | 42 | 0 | 24 | 66 | 1 |
| February 12, 1996 | 42 | 0 | 25 | 67 | 0 |
| May 1996 | 41 | 1 (Note: Previously a member of the DFL, Charlie Berg became an Independent in May 1996.) | 25 | 67 | 0 |
| July 1, 1996 | 40 | 1 | 25 | 66 | 1 |
| Latest voting share | 60% | 1% | 37% | | |
| Beginning of the next Legislature | 42 | 1 | 24 | 67 | 0 |

=== House of Representatives ===
| | Party (Shading indicates majority caucus) | | Total | Vacant |
| | DFL | IR | Total | Vacant |
|---|---|---|---|---|
| End of previous Legislature | 84 | 50 | 134 | 0 |
| Begin | 71 | 63 | 134 | 0 |
| February 2, 1995 | 71 | 62 | 133 | 1 |
| February 21, 1995 | 70 | 62 | 132 | 2 |
| March 13, 1995 | 70 | 63 | 133 | 1 |
| April 4, 1995 | 70 | 64 | 134 | 0 |
| June 18, 1995 | 69 | 64 | 133 | 1 |
| July 1, 1995 | 69 | 63 | 132 | 2 |
| July 11, 1995 | 69 | 64 | 133 | 1 |
| August 1, 1995 | 69 | 65 | 134 | 0 |
| October 15, 1996 | 68 | 65 | 133 | 1 |
| Latest voting share | 51% | 49% | | |
| Beginning of the next Legislature | 70 | 64 | 134 | 0 |

== Leadership ==
=== Senate ===
President of the Senate
Allan Spear (DFL-Minneapolis)

Senate Majority Leader
Roger Moe (DFL-Erskine)

Senate Minority Leader
Dean Johnson (R-Willmar)

=== House of Representatives ===
Speaker of the House
Irv Anderson (DFL-International Falls)

House Majority Leader
Phil Carruthers (DFL-Brooklyn Center)

House Minority Leader
Steve Sviggum (R-Kenyon)

== Members ==
=== Senate ===
| Name | District | City | Party |
|---|---|---|---|
| Anderson, Ellen | 66 | St. Paul | DFL |
| Beckman, Tracy | 26 | Bricelyn | DFL |
| Belanger, William | 41 | Bloomington | IR |
| Berg, Charlie | 13 | Chokio | Ind |
| Berglin, Linda | 61 | Minneapolis | DFL |
| Bertram, Joe | 14 | Paynesville | DFL |
| Betzold, Don | 48 | Fridley | DFL |
| Chandler, Kevin M. | 55 | White Bear Lake | DFL |
| Chmielewski, Florian | 08 | Sturgeon Lake | DFL |
| Cohen, Dick | 64 | St. Paul | DFL |
| Day, Dick | 28 | Owatonna | IR |
| Dille, Steve | 20 | Dassel | IR |
| Finn, Skip | 04 | Cass Lake | DFL |
| Fischbach, Michelle | 14 | Paynesville | IR |
| Flynn, Carol | 62 | Minneapolis | DFL |
| Frederickson, Dennis | 23 | New Ulm | IR |
| Hanson, Paula | 50 | Ham Lake | DFL |
| Hottinger, John | 24 | Mankato | DFL |
| Janezich, Jerry | 05 | Chisholm | DFL |
| Johnson, Dean | 15 | Willmar | IR |
| Johnson, Doug | 06 | Tower | DFL |
| Johnson, Janet | 18 | North Branch | DFL |
| Johnston, Terry | 35 | Prior Lake | IR |
| Kelly, Randy | 67 | St. Paul | DFL |
| Kiscaden, Sheila | 30 | Rochester | IR |
| Kleis, Dave | 16 | St. Cloud | IR |
| Knutson, David | 36 | Burnsville | IR |
| Kramer, Don | 47 | Brooklyn Center | IR |
| Krentz, Jane | 51 | May Township | DFL |
| Kroening, Carl | 58 | Minneapolis | DFL |
| Laidig, Gary | 56 | Stillwater | IR |
| Langseth, Keith | 09 | Glyndon | DFL |
| Larson, Cal | 10 | Fergus Falls | IR |
| Lesewski, Arlene | 21 | Marshall | IR |
| Lessard, Bob | 03 | International Falls | DFL |
| Limmer, Warren | 33 | Maple Grove | IR |
| Marty, John | 54 | Roseville | DFL |
| McGowan, Pat | 33 | Maple Grove | IR |
| Merriam, Gene | 49 | Coon Rapids | DFL |
| Metzen, James | 39 | South St. Paul | DFL |
| Moe, Roger | 02 | Erskine | DFL |
| Mondale, Ted | 44 | Saint Louis Park | DFL |
| Morse, Steven | 32 | Dakota | DFL |
| Murphy, Steve | 29 | Red Wing | DFL |
| Neuville, Thomas | 25 | Northfield | IR |
| Novak, Steve | 52 | New Brighton | DFL |
| Oliver, Edward | 43 | Deephaven | IR |
| Olson, Gen | 34 | Minnetrista | IR |
| Ourada, Mark | 19 | Buffalo | IR |
| Pappas, Sandra | 65 | St. Paul | DFL |
| Pariseau, Pat | 37 | Farmington | IR |
| Piper, Pat | 27 | Austin | DFL |
| Pogemiller, Larry | 59 | Minneapolis | DFL |
| Price, Leonard | 57 | Woodbury | DFL |
| Ranum, Jane | 63 | Minneapolis | DFL |
| Reichgott Junge, Ember | 46 | New Hope | DFL |
| Riveness, Phil | 40 | Bloomington | DFL |
| Robertson, Martha | 45 | Minnetonka | IR |
| Runbeck, Linda | 53 | Circle Pines | IR |
| Sams, Dallas | 11 | Staples | DFL |
| Samuelson, Don | 12 | Brainerd | DFL |
| Scheevel, Kenric | 31 | Preston | IR |
| Solon, Sam | 07 | Duluth | DFL |
| Spear, Allan | 60 | Minneapolis | DFL |
| Stevens, Dan | 17 | Mora | IR |
| Stumpf, LeRoy | 01 | Thief River Falls | DFL |
| Terwilliger, Roy | 42 | Edina | IR |
| Vickerman, Jim | 22 | Tracy | DFL |
| Wiener, Deanna | 38 | Eagan | DFL |

=== House of Representatives ===
| Name | District | City | Party |
|---|---|---|---|
| Abrams, Ron | 45A | Minnetonka | IR |
| Anderson, Bob | 10A | Ottertail | DFL |
| Anderson, Bruce | 19B | Buffalo | IR |
| Anderson, Irv | 03A | International Falls | DFL |
| Bakk, Tom | 06A | Cook | DFL |
| Bertram, Jeff | 14B | Paynesville | DFL |
| Bettermann, Hilda | 10B | Brandon | IR |
| Bishop, Dave | 30B | Rochester | IR |
| Boudreau, Lynda | 25B | Faribault | IR |
| Bradley, Fran | 30A | Rochester | IR |
| Broecker, Sherry | 53B | Vadnais Heights | IR |
| Brown, Chuck | 13A | Appleton | DFL |
| Carlson, Lyndon | 46B | Crystal | DFL |
| Carlson, Skip | 52A | Fridley | IR |
| Carruthers, Phil | 47B | Brooklyn Center | DFL |
| Clark, Karen | 61A | Minneapolis | DFL |
| Commers, Tim | 38A | Eagan | IR |
| Cooper, Roger | 15B | Bird Island | DFL |
| Daggett, Roxann | 11A | Frazee | IR |
| Dauner, Marvin | 09B | Hawley | DFL |
| Davids, Gregory | 31B | Preston | IR |
| Dawkins, Andy | 65A | St. Paul | DFL |
| Dehler, Steve | 14A | St. Joseph | IR |
| Delmont, Mike | 51A | Lexington | DFL |
| Dempsey, Jerry | 29A | Hastings | IR |
| Dorn, John | 24A | Mankato | DFL |
| Entenza, Matt | 64A | St. Paul | DFL |
| Erhardt, Ron | 42A | Edina | IR |
| Farrell, Jim | 67A | St. Paul | DFL |
| Finseth, Tim | 01B | Angus | IR |
| Frerichs, Don | 31A | Rochester | IR |
| Garcia, Edwina | 63B | Richfield | DFL |
| Girard, Jim | 21A | Lynd | IR |
| Goodno, Kevin | 09A | Moorhead | IR |
| Greenfield, Lee | 62A | Minneapolis | DFL |
| Greiling, Mindy | 54B | Roseville | DFL |
| Gunther, Bob | 26A | Fairmont | IR |
| Haas, Bill | 48A | Champlin | IR |
| Hackbarth, Tom | 50A | Cedar | IR |
| Harder, Elaine | 22B | Jackson | IR |
| Hasskamp, Kris | 12A | Crosby | DFL |
| Hausman, Alice | 66B | St. Paul | DFL |
| Holsten, Mark | 56A | Stillwater | IR |
| Hugoson, Gene | 26A | Granada | IR |
| Huntley, Thomas | 06B | Duluth | DFL |
| Jacobs, Joel | 49B | Coon Rapids | DFL |
| Jaros, Mike | 07B | Duluth | DFL |
| Jefferson, Jeff | 58B | Minneapolis | DFL |
| Jennings, Loren Geo | 18B | Harris | DFL |
| Johnson, Alice | 48B | Spring Lake Park | DFL |
| Johnson, Bob | 04A | Bemidji | DFL |
| Johnson, Virgil | 32B | Caledonia | IR |
| Kahn, Phyllis | 59B | Minneapolis | DFL |
| Kalis, Henry | 26B | Walters | DFL |
| Kelley, Steve | 44A | Hopkins | DFL |
| Kelso, Becky | 35B | Shakopee | DFL |
| Kinkel, Tony | 04B | Park Rapids | DFL |
| Knight, Kevin | 40B | Bloomington | IR |
| Knoblach, Jim | 16B | St. Cloud | IR |
| Koppendrayer, LeRoy | 17A | Princeton | IR |
| Kraus, Ron | 27A | Albert Lea | IR |
| Krinkie, Philip | 53A | Shoreview | IR |
| Larsen, Peg | 56B | Lakeland | IR |
| Leighton, Rob | 27B | Austin | DFL |
| Leppik, Peggy | 45B | Golden Valley | IR |
| Lieder, Bernard | 02A | Crookston | DFL |
| Limmer, Warren | 33B | Maple Grove | IR |
| Lindner, Arlon | 33A | Corcoran | IR |
| Long, Dee | 60A | Minneapolis | DFL |
| Lourey, Becky | 08B | Kerrick | DFL |
| Luther, Darlene | 47A | Brooklyn Park | DFL |
| Lynch, Teresa | 50B | Andover | IR |
| Macklin, Bill | 37B | Lakeville | IR |
| Mahon, Mark | 40A | Bloomington | DFL |
| Mares, Harry | 55A | White Bear Lake | IR |
| Mariani, Carlos | 65B | St. Paul | DFL |
| Marko, Sharon | 57B | Newport | DFL |
| McCollum, Betty | 55B | North St. Paul | DFL |
| McElroy, Dan | 36B | Burnsville | IR |
| McGuire, Mary Jo | 54A | Falcon Heights | DFL |
| Milbert, Bob | 39B | South St. Paul | DFL |
| Molnau, Carol | 35A | Chaska | IR |
| Mulder, Richard | 21B | Ivanhoe | IR |
| Munger, Willard | 07A | Duluth | DFL |
| Murphy, Mary | 08A | Hermantown | DFL |
| Ness, Bob | 20A | Dassel | IR |
| Olson, Edgar | 02B | Fosston | DFL |
| Olson, Mark | 19A | Big Lake | IR |
| Onnen, Tony | 20B | Cokato | IR |
| Opatz, Joe | 16A | St. Cloud | DFL |
| Orenstein, Howard | 64B | St. Paul | DFL |
| Orfield, Myron | 60B | Minneapolis | DFL |
| Osskopp, Mike | 29B | Lake City | IR |
| Osthoff, Tom | 66A | St. Paul | DFL |
| Ostrom, Don | 24B | St. Peter | DFL |
| Otremba, Ken | 11B | Long Prairie | DFL |
| Ozment, Dennis | 37A | Rosemount | IR |
| Paulsen, Erik | 42B | Eden Prairie | IR |
| Pawlenty, Tim | 38B | Eagan | IR |
| Pellow, Dick | 52B | New Brighton | IR |
| Pelowski, Gene | 32A | Winona | DFL |
| Perlt, Walt | 57A | Woodbury | DFL |
| Petersen, Doug | 13B | Madison | DFL |
| Pugh, Tom | 39A | South St. Paul | DFL |
| Rest, Ann | 46A | New Hope | DFL |
| Rhodes, Jim | 44B | St. Louis Park | IR |
| Rice, Jim | 58A | Minneapolis | DFL |
| Rostberg, Jim | 18A | Isanti | IR |
| Rukavina, Tom | 05A | Virginia | DFL |
| Sarna, John | 59A | Minneapolis | DFL |
| Schumacher, Leslie | 17B | Princeton | DFL |
| Seagren, Alice | 41B | Bloomington | IR |
| Simoneau, Wayne | 52A | Fridley | DFL |
| Skoglund, Wes | 62B | Minneapolis | DFL |
| Smith, Steve | 34A | Mound | IR |
| Solberg, Loren | 03B | Bovey | DFL |
| Stanek, Rich | 33B | Maple Grove | IR |
| Sviggum, Steve | 28B | Kenyon | IR |
| Swenson, Doug | 51B | Forest Lake | IR |
| Swenson, Howard | 23B | Nicollet | IR |
| Sykora, Barb | 43B | Excelsior | IR |
| Tomassoni, Dave | 05B | Chisholm | DFL |
| Tompkins, Eileen | 36A | Apple Valley | IR |
| Trimble, Steve | 67B | St. Paul | DFL |
| Tuma, John | 25A | Northfield | IR |
| Tunheim, Jim | 01A | Kennedy | DFL |
| Van Dellen, H. Todd | 34B | Plymouth | IR |
| Van Engen, Tom | 15A | Spicer | IR |
| Vickerman, Barb | 23A | Redwood Falls | IR |
| Wagenius, Jean | 63A | Minneapolis | DFL |
| Warkentin, E.H. | 49B | Coon Rapids | IR |
| Weaver, Charlie | 49A | Anoka | IR |
| Wejcman, Linda | 61B | Minneapolis | DFL |
| Wenzel, Steve | 12B | Little Falls | DFL |
| Winter, Ted | 22A | Fulda | DFL |
| Wolf, Ken | 41B | Burnsville | IR |
| Worke, Gary | 28A | Waseca | IR |
| Workman, Tom | 43A | Chanhassen | IR |

== Membership changes ==
=== Senate ===
| District | Vacated by | Reason for change | Successor | Date successor seated |
|---|---|---|---|---|
| 33 | Pat McGowan (IR) | Became Sheriff of Hennepin County on January 3, 1995, pursuant to having won the 1994 election for that office. | Warren Limmer (IR) | February 13, 1995 |
| 14 | Joe Bertram (DFL) | Resigned on January 9, 1996, as the Senate considered expelling him. | Michelle Fischbach (R) | February 12, 1996 |
| 4 | Skip Finn (DFL) | Resigned July 1, 1996, after being convicted of 12 felonies. | Remained vacant | |

=== House of Representatives ===
| District | Vacated by | Reason for change | Successor | Date successor seated |
|---|---|---|---|---|
| 33B | Warren Limmer (IR) | Resigned February 13, 1995, to fill Pat McGowan's vacated seat in the Senate, pursuant to the results of a special election held on February 2, 1995. | Rich Stanek (IR) | February 13, 1995 |
| 49B | Joel Jacobs (DFL) | Resigned March 5, 1995, to accept appointment to the Minnesota Public Utilities Commission. | E.H. Warkentin (IR) | April 10, 1995 |
| 52A | Wayne Simoneau (DFL) | Resigned June 18, 1995, to accept appointment as a deputy commissioner in the Minnesota Department of Employee Relations. | Skip Carlson (IR) | July 11, 1995 |
| 26A | Gene Hugoson (IR) | Resigned June 30, 1995, to accept appointment as the Minnesota Commissioner of Agriculture. | Bob Gunther (IR) | August 1, 1995 |
| 58A | Jim Rice (DFL) | Died of an apparent heart attack on October 15, 1996. | Remained vacant | |

== Notes ==
| Preceded by Seventy-eighth Minnesota Legislature | Seventy-ninth Minnesota Legislature; 1995—1997 | Succeeded by Eightieth Minnesota Legislature |
