= 80th Minnesota Legislature =

1997 to 1998 legislative session

Eightieth Minnesota Legislature
←	79th Minnesota Legislature	81st Minnesota Legislature	→
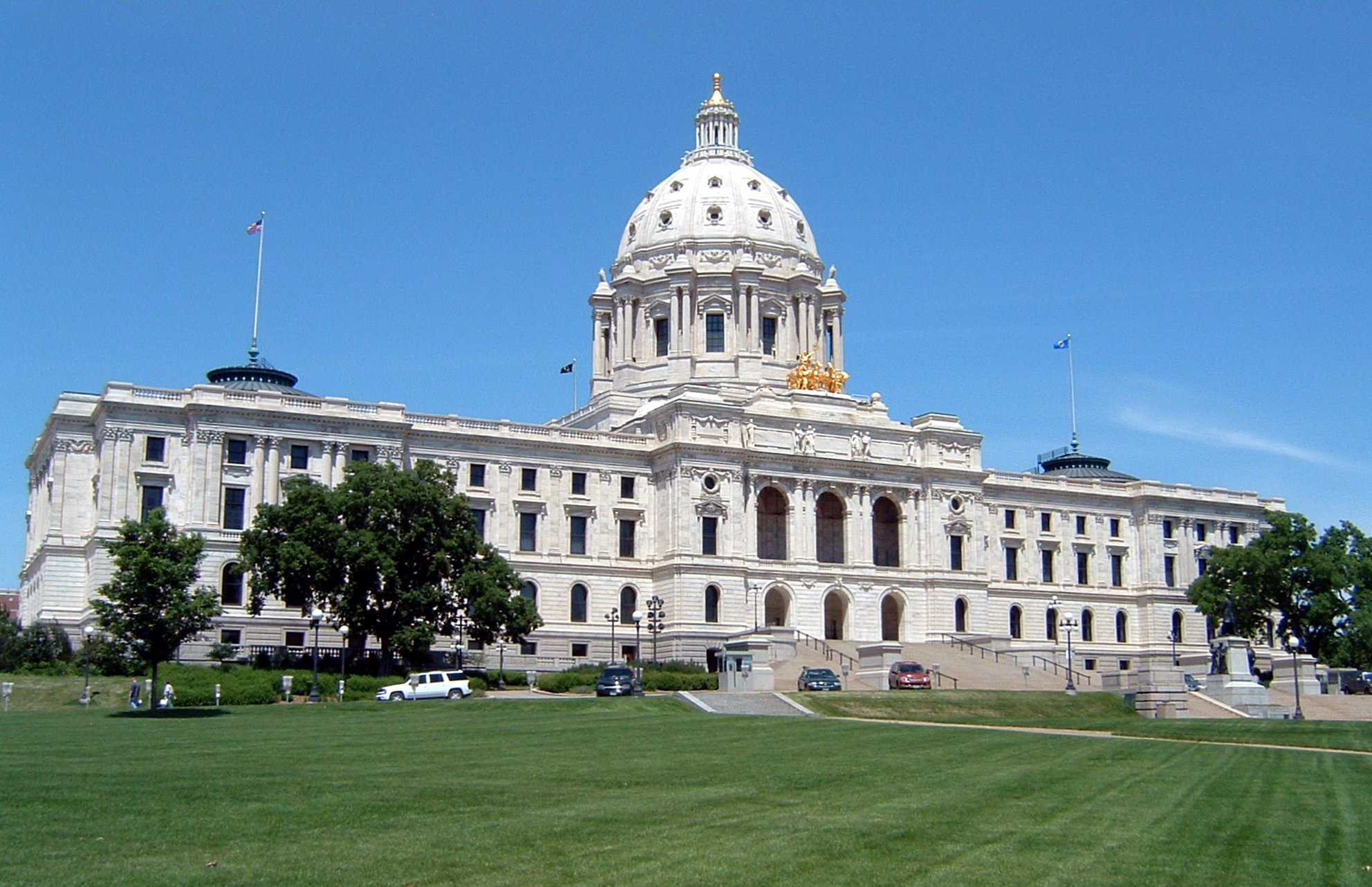

Overview
- Legislative body: Minnesota Legislature
- Jurisdiction: Minnesota, United States
- Meeting place: Minnesota State Capitol
- Term: January 7, 1997 – January 5, 1999
- Website: www.leg.state.mn.us

Minnesota State Senate
- Members: 67 Senators
- President: Allan Spear
- Majority Leader: Roger Moe
- Minority Leader: Dean Johnson, Dick Day
- Party control: Democratic-Farmer-Labor Party

Minnesota House of Representatives
- Members: 134 Representatives
- Speaker: Phil Carruthers
- Majority Leader: Ted Winter
- Minority Leader: Steve Sviggum
- Party control: Democratic-Farmer-Labor Party

The eightieth Minnesota Legislature first convened on January 7, 1997. The 67 members of the Minnesota Senate and the 134 members of the Minnesota House of Representatives were elected during the General Election of November 5, 1996.

== Sessions ==
The legislature met in a regular session from January 7, 1997, to May 15, 1997. A special session convened on June 26, 1997, to consider funding for K–12 schools, DWI measures, and government data practices. A second special session was convened on August 19, 1997, to provide flood relief and consider commissioners' pay and the minimum wage. A third special session was held from October 23, 1997, to November 14, 1997, to consider providing funding for a baseball stadium.

A continuation of the regular session was held between January 20, 1998, and April 9, 1998. An additional special session met from April 20, 1998, to April 22, 1998, to clarify legislation to allow for fraud recovery, and consider economic development issues and issues relevant to early childhood and family education.

== Party summary ==
Resignations and new members are discussed in the "Membership changes" section, below.

=== Senate ===
	Party (Shading indicates majority caucus)			Total	Vacant
	DFL	Ind	Rep	Total	Vacant
End of previous Legislature	40	1	25	66	1
Begin	42	1	24	67	0
Latest voting share	63%	1%	36%		
Beginning of the next Legislature	42	1	24	67	0

=== House of Representatives ===
	Party (Shading indicates majority caucus)		Total	Vacant
	DFL	Rep	Total	Vacant
End of previous Legislature	68	65	133	1
Begin	70	64	134	0
September 4, 1997	69	64	133	1
November 13, 1997	70	64	134	0
December 6, 1997	70	63	133	1
December 22, 1997	70	62	132	2
January 15, 1998	70	61	131	3
January 20, 1998	70	62	132	2
January 29, 1998	70	63	133	1
February 5, 1998	70	64	134	0
Latest voting share	52%	48%		
Beginning of the next Legislature	63	71	134	0

== Leadership ==
=== Senate ===
President of the Senate
Allan Spear (DFL-Minneapolis)

Senate Majority Leader
Roger Moe (DFL-Erskine)

Senate Minority Leader
Until July 9, 1997 Dean Johnson (R-Willmar)
After July 9, 1997 Dick Day (R-Owatonna)

=== House of Representatives ===
Speaker of the House
Phil Carruthers (DFL-Brooklyn Center)

House Majority Leader
Ted Winter (DFL-Fulda)

House Minority Leader
Steve Sviggum (R-Kenyon)

== Members ==
=== Senate ===
Name	District	City	Party
Anderson, Ellen	66	St. Paul	DFL
Beckman, Tracy	26	Bricelyn	DFL
Belanger, William	41	Bloomington	Rep
Berg, Charlie	13	Chokio	Ind
Berglin, Linda	61	Minneapolis	DFL
Betzold, Don	48	Fridley	DFL
Cohen, Dick	64	St. Paul	DFL
Day, Dick	28	Owatonna	Rep
Dille, Steve	20	Dassel	Rep
Fischbach, Michelle	14	Paynesville	Rep
Flynn, Carol	62	Minneapolis	DFL
Foley, Leo	49	Coon Rapids	DFL
Frederickson, Dennis	23	New Ulm	Rep
Hanson, Paula	50	Ham Lake	DFL
Higgins, Linda	58	Minneapolis	DFL
Hottinger, John	24	Mankato	DFL
Janezich, Jerry	05	Chisholm	DFL
Johnson, Dave	40	Bloomington	DFL
Johnson, Dean	15	Willmar	Rep
Johnson, Doug	06	Tower	DFL
Johnson, Janet	18	North Branch	DFL
Kelley, Steve	44	Hopkins	DFL
Kelly, Randy	67	St. Paul	DFL
Kiscaden, Sheila	30	Rochester	Rep
Kleis, Dave	16	St. Cloud	Rep
Knutson, David	36	Burnsville	Rep
Krentz, Jane	51	May Township	DFL
Laidig, Gary	56	Stillwater	Rep
Langseth, Keith	09	Glyndon	DFL
Larson, Cal	10	Fergus Falls	Rep
Lesewski, Arlene	21	Marshall	Rep
Lessard, Bob	03	International Falls	DFL
Limmer, Warren	33	Maple Grove	Rep
Lourey, Becky	08	Kerrick	DFL
Marty, John	54	Roseville	DFL
Metzen, James	39	South St. Paul	DFL
Moe, Roger	02	Erskine	DFL
Morse, Steven	32	Dakota	DFL
Murphy, Steve	29	Red Wing	DFL
Neuville, Thomas	25	Northfield	Rep
Novak, Steve	52	New Brighton	DFL
Oliver, Edward	43	Deephaven	Rep
Olson, Gen	34	Minnetrista	Rep
Ourada, Mark	19	Buffalo	Rep
Pappas, Sandra	65	St. Paul	DFL
Pariseau, Pat	37	Farmington	Rep
Piper, Pat	27	Austin	DFL
Pogemiller, Larry	59	Minneapolis	DFL
Price, Leonard	57	Woodbury	DFL
Ranum, Jane	63	Minneapolis	DFL
Reichgott Junge, Ember	46	New Hope	DFL
Robertson, Martha	45	Minnetonka	Rep
Robling, Claire	35	Prior Lake	Rep
Runbeck, Linda	53	Circle Pines	Rep
Sams, Dallas	11	Staples	DFL
Samuelson, Don	12	Brainerd	DFL
Scheevel, Kenric	31	Preston	Rep
Scheid, Linda	47	Brooklyn Park	DFL
Solon, Sam	07	Duluth	DFL
Spear, Allan	60	Minneapolis	DFL
Stevens, Dan	17	Mora	Rep
Stumpf, LeRoy	01	Thief River Falls	DFL
Ten Eyck, David	04	East Gull Lake	DFL
Terwilliger, Roy	42	Edina	Rep
Vickerman, Jim	22	Tracy	DFL
Wiener, Deanna	38	Eagan	DFL
Wiger, Chuck	55	North St. Paul	DFL

=== House of Representatives ===
Name	District	City	Party
Abrams, Ron	45A	Minnetonka	Rep
Anderson, Bruce	19B	Buffalo	Rep
Anderson, Irv	03A	International Falls	DFL
Bakk, Tom	06A	Cook	DFL
Bettermann, Hilda	10B	Brandon	Rep
Biernat, Len	59A	Minneapolis	DFL
Bishop, Dave	30B	Rochester	Rep
Boudreau, Lynda	25B	Faribault	Rep
Bradley, Fran	30A	Rochester	Rep
Broecker, Sherry	53B	Vadnais Heights	Rep
Carlson, Lyndon	46B	Crystal	DFL
Carruthers, Phil	47B	Brooklyn Center	DFL
Chaudhary, Satveer	52A	Fridley	DFL
Clark, James	23A	Springfield	Rep
Clark, Karen	61A	Minneapolis	DFL
Commers, Tim	38A	Eagan	Rep
Daggett, Roxann	11A	Frazee	Rep
Davids, Gregory	31B	Preston	Rep
Dawkins, Andy	65A	St. Paul	DFL
Dehler, Steve	14A	St. Joseph	Rep
Delmont, Mike	51A	Lexington	DFL
Dempsey, Jerry	29A	Hastings	Rep
Dorn, John	24A	Mankato	DFL
Entenza, Matt	64A	St. Paul	DFL
Erhardt, Ron	42A	Edina	Rep
Erickson, Sondra	17A	Princeton	Rep
Evans, Geri	52B	New Brighton	DFL
Farrell, Jim	67A	St. Paul	DFL
Finseth, Tim	01B	Angus	Rep
Folliard, Betty	44A	Hopkins	DFL
Garcia, Edwina	63B	Richfield	DFL
Goodno, Kevin	09A	Moorhead	Rep
Greenfield, Lee	62A	Minneapolis	DFL
Greiling, Mindy	54B	Roseville	DFL
Gunther, Bob	26A	Fairmont	Rep
Haas, Bill	48A	Champlin	Rep
Harder, Elaine	22B	Jackson	Rep
Hasskamp, Kris	12A	Crosby	DFL
Hausman, Alice	66B	St. Paul	DFL
Hilty, Bill	08B	Finlayson	DFL
Holsten, Mark	56A	Stillwater	Rep
Huntley, Thomas	06B	Duluth	DFL
Jaros, Mike	07B	Duluth	DFL
Jefferson, Jeff	58B	Minneapolis	DFL
Jennings, Loren Geo	18B	Harris	DFL
Johnson, Alice	48B	Spring Lake Park	DFL
Johnson, Ruth	24B	St. Peter	DFL
Juhnke, Al	15A	Willmar	DFL
Kahn, Phyllis	59B	Minneapolis	DFL
Kalis, Henry	26B	Walters	DFL
Kelso, Becky	35B	Shakopee	DFL
Kielkucki, Tony	20B	Lester Prairie	Rep
Kinkel, Tony	04B	Park Rapids	DFL
Knight, Kevin	40B	Bloomington	Rep
Knoblach, Jim	16B	St. Cloud	Rep
Koppendrayer, LeRoy	17A	Princeton	Rep
Koskinen, Luanne	49B	Coon Rapids	DFL
Kraus, Ron	27A	Albert Lea	Rep
Krinkie, Philip	53A	Shoreview	Rep
Kubly, Gary	15B	Granite Falls	DFL
Kuisle, Bill	31A	Rochester	Rep
Larsen, Peg	56B	Lakeland	Rep
Leighton, Rob	27B	Austin	DFL
Leppik, Peggy	45B	Golden Valley	Rep
Lieder, Bernard	02A	Crookston	DFL
Lindner, Arlon	33A	Corcoran	Rep
Long, Dee	60A	Minneapolis	DFL
Luther, Darlene	47A	Brooklyn Park	DFL
Macklin, Bill	37B	Lakeville	Rep
Mahon, Mark	40A	Bloomington	DFL
Mares, Harry	55A	White Bear Lake	Rep
Mariani, Carlos	65B	St. Paul	DFL
Marko, Sharon	57B	Newport	DFL
McCollum, Betty	55B	North St. Paul	DFL
McElroy, Dan	36B	Burnsville	Rep
McGuire, Mary Jo	54A	Falcon Heights	DFL
Milbert, Bob	39B	South St. Paul	DFL
Molnau, Carol	35A	Chaska	Rep
Mulder, Richard	21B	Ivanhoe	Rep
Mullery, Joe	58A	Minneapolis	DFL
Munger, Willard	07A	Duluth	DFL
Murphy, Mary	08A	Hermantown	DFL
Ness, Bob	20A	Dassel	Rep
Nornes, Bud	10A	Fergus Falls	Rep
Olson, Edgar	02B	Fosston	DFL
Olson, Mark	19A	Big Lake	Rep
Opatz, Joe	16A	St. Cloud	DFL
Orfield, Myron	60B	Minneapolis	DFL
Osskopp, Mike	29B	Lake City	Rep
Osthoff, Tom	66A	St. Paul	DFL
Otremba, Ken	11B	Long Prairie	DFL
Otremba, Mary Ellen	11B	Long Prairie	DFL
Ozment, Dennis	37A	Rosemount	Rep
Paulsen, Erik	42B	Eden Prairie	Rep
Pawlenty, Tim	38B	Eagan	Rep
Paymar, Michael	64B	St. Paul	DFL
Pelowski, Gene	32A	Winona	DFL
Petersen, Doug	13B	Madison	DFL
Pugh, Tom	39A	South St. Paul	DFL
Rest, Ann	46A	New Hope	DFL
Reuter, Doug	28A	Owatonna	Rep
Rhodes, Jim	44B	St. Louis Park	Rep
Rifenberg, Michelle	32B	La Crescent	Rep
Rostberg, Jim	18A	Isanti	Rep
Rukavina, Tom	05A	Virginia	DFL
Schumacher, Leslie	17B	Princeton	DFL
Seagren, Alice	41B	Bloomington	Rep
Seifert, Marty	21A	Marshall	Rep
Sekhon, Kathleen	50A	Burns Township	DFL
Skare, Gail	04A	Bemidji	DFL
Skoglund, Wes	62B	Minneapolis	DFL
Slawik, Nora	57A	Maplewood	DFL
Smith, Steve	34A	Mound	Rep
Solberg, Loren	03B	Bovey	DFL
Stanek, Rich	33B	Maple Grove	Rep
Stang, Doug	14B	Cold Spring	Rep
Sviggum, Steve	28B	Kenyon	Rep
Swenson, Doug	51B	Forest Lake	Rep
Swenson, Howard	23B	Nicollet	Rep
Sykora, Barb	43B	Excelsior	Rep
Tingelstad, Kathy	50B	Andover	Rep
Tomassoni, Dave	05B	Chisholm	DFL
Tompkins, Eileen	36A	Apple Valley	Rep
Trimble, Steve	67B	St. Paul	DFL
Tuma, John	25A	Northfield	Rep
Tunheim, Jim	01A	Kennedy	DFL
Van Dellen, H. Todd	34B	Plymouth	Rep
Vandeveer, Ray	51B	Forest Lake	Rep
Vickerman, Barb	23A	Redwood Falls	Rep
Wagenius, Jean	63A	Minneapolis	DFL
Weaver, Charlie	49A	Anoka	Rep
Wejcman, Linda	61B	Minneapolis	DFL
Wenzel, Steve	12B	Little Falls	DFL
Westfall, Bob	09B	Rothsay	Rep
Westrom, Torrey	13A	Elbow Lake	Rep
Winter, Ted	22A	Fulda	DFL
Wolf, Ken	41B	Burnsville	Rep
Workman, Tom	43A	Chanhassen	Rep

== Membership changes ==
=== House of Representatives ===
District	Vacated by	Reason for change	Successor	Date successor seated
11B	Ken Otremba (DFL)	Died of liver cancer on September 4, 1997.	Mary Ellen Otremba (DFL)	November 13, 1997
17A	LeRoy Koppendrayer (R)	Resigned December 8, 1997, to accept appointment by Governor Arne Carlson to the Minnesota Public Utilities Commission.	Sondra Erickson (R)	January 20, 1998
23A	Barbara Vickerman (R)	Died of liver cancer on December 22, 1997.	James Clark (R)	January 29, 1998
51B	Doug Swenson (R)	Resigned January 15, 1998, to accept appointment to district judgeship.	Ray Vandeveer (R)	February 5, 1998

Preceded by Seventy-ninth Minnesota Legislature	Eightieth Minnesota Legislature; 1997—1999	Succeeded by Eighty-first Minnesota Legislature
