= Warkentin =

Warkentin is a surname of German-Russian Mennonite origin. Notable people with the surname include:

- E.H. Warkentin (1933–20??), American politician and businessman
- Sabine Warkentin (born 1941), French chess master
- Chris Warkentin (born 1978), Canadian politician
- Mark Warkentin (born 1979), American swimmer
- Lindsay Warkentin (born 1982), Canadian curler

== See also ==
- Warkentin House
