= Marcus M. Marsh =

American politician

Member of the Minnesota House of Representatives from district 17A
- In office January 6, 1981 – January 4, 1993
- Preceded by: Al Patton
- Succeeded by: LeRoy Koppendrayer

Personal details
- Born: July 25, 1949 (age 76)
- Party: Republican

Marcus M. Marsh (born July 25, 1949) is an American politician who served in the Minnesota House of Representatives from district 17A from 1981 to 1993.
