= Gloria Segal =

American politician and businesswoman

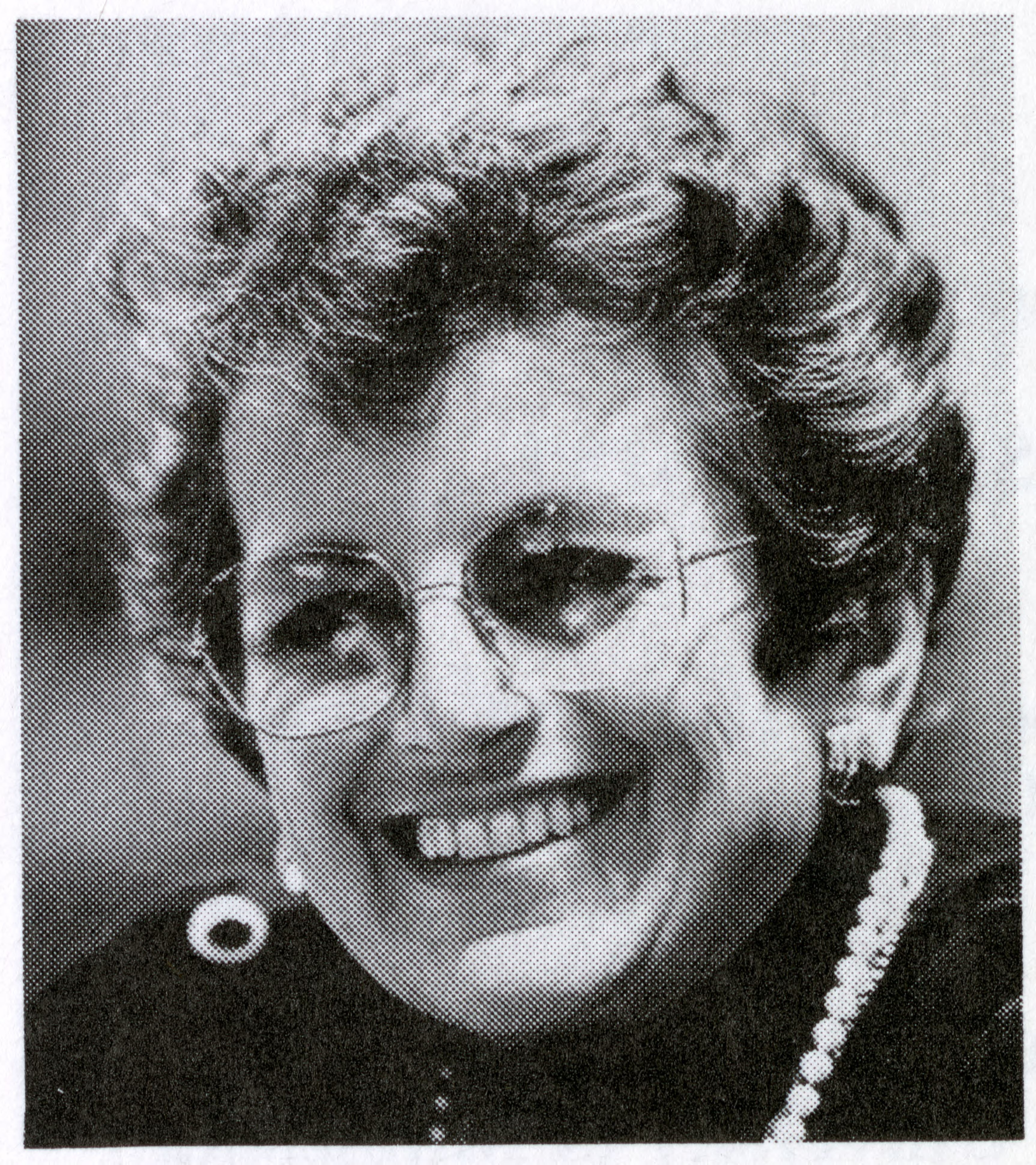

Member of the Minnesota House of Representatives from the 44B district
- In office January 3, 1983 – December 14, 1992
- Succeeded by: Jim Rhodes

Personal details
- Born: April 11, 1928 Minneapolis, Minnesota
- Died: October 27, 1993 (aged 65) St Louis Park, Minnesota
- Party: Democratic
- Education: North High School, Minneapolis
- Alma mater: University of Minneapolis; Metropolitan State University; Harvard Business School
- Occupation: Politician; Businesswoman

Gloria M. Segal (née Rodich) (April 11, 1928 – October 27, 1993) was an American politician and businesswoman.

Born in Minneapolis, Minnesota, Segal graduated from North High School, in Minneapolis, Minnesota. Segal graduated from the University of Minneapolis and went to Metropolitan State University. She also went to Harvard Business School. Segal was involved with the investment business. Segal lived in St. Louis Park, Minnesota. Segal served in the Minnesota House of Representatives from 1983 until her resignation in 1992 because her treatment from brain cancer. Segal was a Democrat. Segal died at her home in St. Louis Park, Minnesota from a cancerous brain tumor.
