= Charles A. Berg =

American politician (1927–2014)

Charles Allen "Charlie" Berg (October 15, 1927 – January 22, 2014) was an American farmer and politician.

Born in Graceville, Minnesota, Berg went to the West Central School of Agriculture in Morris, Minnesota. Berg was a farmer and cattle breeder. He served on the Chokio, Minnesota School Board. Berg also served in the Minnesota Senate from 1973 to 2002. At different times, he was a Democrat, Republican, and Independent. He died in Minneapolis, Minnesota.

Berg was a Lutheran.
