= H. Todd Van Dellen =

American politician

Todd Van Dellen

Member of the Minnesota House of Representatives from the 34B district
- In office January 5, 1993 – January 2, 2001
- Preceded by: Gene Pelowski
- Succeeded by: Jeff Johnson

Personal details
- Born: April 24, 1964 (age 62) Springfield, Missouri, U.S.
- Party: Republican
- Spouse: Dana Lynn
- Children: 5, including Grace
- Education: University of North Dakota (BBA); University of Minnesota (JD)
- Occupation: attorney

Henry Todd Van Dellen (born April 24, 1964) is an American politician in the state of Minnesota. He served in the Minnesota House of Representatives.
