= Gail Skare =

American politician

Gail Skare (born April 29, 1939) was an American politician.

Skare lived in Bemidji, Minnesota with her husband and family. She went to Bemidji State University. Skare served on the Beltrami County Commission and was a Democrat. She served in the Minnesota House of Representatives in 1997 and 1998.
