= Steve Dille =

American politician (1945–2020)

Member of the Minnesota Senate from the 18th district
- In office January 5, 1993 – January 3, 2011
- Preceded by: John Bernhagen
- Succeeded by: Scott Newman

Member of the Minnesota House of Representatives from the 21A district
- In office January 6, 1987 – January 4, 1993
- Preceded by: Adolph Kvam
- Succeeded by: Bob Ness (Redistricted 20A)

Personal details
- Born: Stephen Everett Dille; March 16, 1945 Minneapolis, Minnesota, United States
- Died: March 25, 2020 (aged 75) Dassel, Minnesota, United States
- Party: Republican
- Spouse: Pamela Johnson Dille
- Children: 4
- Occupation: Farmer veterinarian legislator writer

Stephen Everett Dille (March 16, 1945 – March 25, 2020) was a Minnesota politician and a member of the Minnesota Senate representing District 18, which includes portions of Carver, McLeod, Meeker, Stearns and Wright counties just west of the Twin Cities metropolitan area.

== Background ==
Dille was born in Minneapolis, Minnesota in 1945. He graduated from Litchfield High School in 1963, and later obtained a B.S. from the University of Minnesota and, in 1969, a Doctor of Veterinary Medicine Degree from the University of Minnesota's College of Veterinary Medicine. He was a civilian veterinary advisory in Vietnam for three and a half years during the Vietnam War.

Dille was an experienced rodeo cowboy, and was state champion calf roper, steer wrestler, and bull rider. In high school he won the Minnesota All Around Cowboy title twice and placed fourth in the nation in steer wrestling.

Dille lived in Dassel, Minnesota with his wife Pamela, who works as a media specialist at Dassel Elementary. They have four children and nine grandchildren. Dille wrote books about the family history and an autobiography. Dille also wrote an article about the value of cattle in the Minnesota economy. Dille died on March 25, 2020, in Dassel, Minnesota.

== Service in the Minnesota House and Senate ==
Dille served as a township supervisor in Dassel from 1977 to 1984, and as a Meeker County commissioner from 1985 to 1987. He was elected to the Minnesota House of Representatives from the old District 21A in 1986 and was re-elected in 1988 and 1990.

In 1992, Dille was elected to the Minnesota Senate from the old District 20, which later became the current District 18 after the 2002 redistricting. He was re-elected in 1996, 2000, 2002 and 2006.

Dille was a member of the senate's Agriculture & Veterans, Capital Investment, Environment & Natural Resources, and Finance committees. He also served on the Finance subcommittees for the Agriculture and Veterans Budget and Policy Division, for the Environment, Energy and Natural Resources Budget Division, and for the Environment, Energy and Natural Resources Budget Division-Energy Subdivision.

On November 17, 2009, Dille announced that he would not seek election to a sixth term in the Senate.

== Electoral history ==
- 2006 Race for Minnesota Senate – District 18
  - Steve Dille (R) 61.94% (19654 votes)
  - Hal Kimball (DFL), 37.99% (12054 votes)
  - Write-in, 0.08% (24 votes)
- 2002 Race for Minnesota Senate – District 18
  - Steve Dille (R) 68.36% (21368 votes)
  - Sheila D. Sudbeck (DFL), 28.33% (8855 votes)
  - Paul Murray (Constitution) 3.22%(1006 votes)
  - Write-in, 0.10% (31 votes)
- 2000 Race for Minnesota Senate – District 20
  - Steve Dille (R) 65.14% (21071 votes)
  - Jeffrey R. Krueger (DFL), 34.86% (11274 votes)

== Bibliography ==
- Dille, Stephen Everett and Dille, Bonnie Anderson. Self-Made in America: A Biography of Alfred Anderson: Business Entrepreneur, Civic Leader, and Family Patriarch. North Star Press of St. Cloud, Inc. Pamela and Stephen Dille, 2011
- Dille, Steve. Livestock, Good for the Economy and Good for the Environment: Minnesota Needs More Livestock: a Report. Dassel, MN: S. Dille, 2005.
