= Doug Swenson =

American lawyer and politician

Member of the Minnesota House of Representatives
- In office 1987–1998

Personal details
- Born: August 16, 1945 St. Peter, Minnesota, U.S.
- Died: February 1, 2009 (aged 63) Saint Paul, Minnesota, U.S.
- Party: Republican
- Education: Gustavus Adolphus College, Hamline University (JD)

Douglas G. Swenson (August 16, 1945 – February 1, 2009) was an American politician, lawyer, and judge. He served in the Minnesota House of Representatives as a Republican and later as a Minnesota district court judge.

== Early life and education ==
Swenson was born in St. Peter, Minnesota and graduated from Bethany Lutheran High School in Mankato, Minnesota, in 1963. He pursued higher education at Gustavus Adolphus College and then earned his Juris Doctor degree from Mitchell Hamline School of Law in 1971.

== Career ==
After completing his legal education, Swenson practiced law in Forest Lake, Minnesota. His legal career was complemented by his involvement in politics. Swenson served in the Minnesota House of Representatives from 1987 to 1998, representing the Republican Party. Swenson was known for his work on public safety issues and was instrumental in creating laws to toughen penalties for driving while intoxicated and addressing underage drinking. He was succeeded in the Legislature by his brother, Howard Swenson.

After his tenure in the House, he continued his career in the judiciary as a Minnesota district court judge.

== Personal life ==
Swenson resided in Forest Lake, Minnesota with his wife and family, where he was an active member of the community. He was a Lutheran.

== Death ==
Swenson died on February 1, 2009, due to leukemia at the United Hospital in Saint Paul, Minnesota.
