= Steve Smith (Minnesota politician) =

Minnesota politician and a member of the Minnesota House of Representatives

Member of the Minnesota House of Representatives from the 33A district
- In office January 8, 1991 – January 7, 2013
- Preceded by: John Burger
- Succeeded by: Jerry Hertaus

Personal details
- Born: November 29, 1949
- Died: c. April 7, 2014 (aged 64) Hennepin County, Minnesota
- Party: Republican
- Spouse: Cindi
- Children: 1
- Education: University of Minnesota (BA); Oklahoma City University School of Law (JD)
- Profession: attorney, legislator

Steven Smith (November 29, 1949 – c. April 7, 2014) was a Minnesota politician and a member of the Minnesota House of Representatives representing District 33A, which includes portions of Hennepin and Wright counties in the western Twin Cities metropolitan area. A Republican, he was an attorney by profession.

Smith was first elected in 1990, and was reelected every two years thereafter until defeated in 2012. Prior to the 1992 legislative redistricting, he represented the old District 43A, and prior to the 2002 redistricting, he represented the old District 34A. His top legislative priorities included tax cuts and government reform.

Smith was vice chair of the House Ethics Committee, a member of the Finance Committee, and a member of the Finance subcommittee for the Public Safety Finance Division. He served as deputy minority leader. He was chair of the Civil Law Committee from 1999–2002, the Judiciary Policy and Finance Committee during the 2003-2004 biennium, and the Public Safety Policy and Finance Committee during the 2005-2006 biennium.

After being redistricted into a new district, Smith was defeated in the 2012 Republican primary by Tea Party activist Cindy Pugh.

Smith graduated from Lester Prairie High School in Lester Prairie, then went on to the University of Minnesota in Minneapolis, graduating with a B.A. in political science. He then attended Oklahoma City University School of Law in Oklahoma City, Oklahoma, earning his J.D. He served on the Mound City Council from 1984–1986, and as mayor of Mound from 1987-1990. He was found dead at his home, where he lived alone, on April 7, 2014.

Minnesota House of Representatives
Preceded by John Burger	Member of the Minnesota House of Representatives from the 43A district 1991–1993	Succeeded by Tom Workman
Preceded by Virgil J. Johnson	Member of the Minnesota House of Representatives from the 34A district 1993–2003	Succeeded by Paul Kohls
Preceded by Arlon Lindner	Member of the Minnesota House of Representatives from the 33A district 2003–2013	Succeeded by Jerry Hertaus
