= Bob Gunther =

American politician

Member of the Minnesota House of Representatives
- In office August 1, 1995 – January 5, 2021
- Preceded by: Gene Hugoson
- Succeeded by: Bjorn Olson
- Constituency: 26A(1995–2003); 24A(2003–2013); 23A(2013–2021)

Personal details
- Born: July 12, 1943 (age 83) Fairmont, Minnesota, U.S.
- Party: Republican
- Education: St. Cloud State University (BA)

Military service
- Branch: United States Navy

Bob Gunther (born July 12, 1943) is a Minnesota politician and former member of the Minnesota House of Representatives. A member of the Republican Party of Minnesota, he represented the 23A district, which includes all or portions of Blue Earth, Faribault, Jackson, Martin and Watonwan counties.

== Early life and education ==
Gunther was born in Sioux City, Iowa, and graduated from Fairmont High School in Fairmont. He served in the United States Navy until age 26, then earned a Bachelor of Science degree in marketing from Saint Cloud State University.

== Career ==
Gunther co-owned Gunther's Foods in Fairmont and Elmore.

Gunther was first elected to the Minnesota House of Representatives as a Republican in 1995 in a special election held after Representative Gene Hugoson was appointed Minnesota commissioner of agriculture. He served until 2021, after not seeking reelection in 2020.

Until redistricting in 2002, Gunther represented district 26A.

== Personal life ==
Gunther is married to Nancy, and they have one child. He is a member of the Bethel Evangelical Free Church. He enjoys reading Louis L'Amour and Robert Ludlum.
