= Wayne Simoneau =

American politician

Wayne A. Simoneau (January 17, 1935 – May 21, 2017) was an American politician.

Born and raised in Washburn, Wisconsin, Simoneau served in the Minnesota National Guard. He went to Dunwoody College of Technology and to Anoka-Ramsey Community College. Simoneau also went to the George Washington University and University of Minnesota. He worked as a mechanic and lived in Fridley, Minnesota. Simoneau served as deputy county auditor for Anoka County, Minnesota from 1989 to 1991. From 1975 to 1995, Simoneau served in the Minnesota House of Representatives and was a Democrat. In 1995, Simoneau resigned from the Minnesota Legislature when he was appointed deputy commissioner for the Minnesota Department of Employee Relations. Simoneau then served as commissioner of the Minnesota Department of Finance from 1996 to 1999. Simoneau died in Blaine, Minnesota.
