= Jane Krentz =

American politician

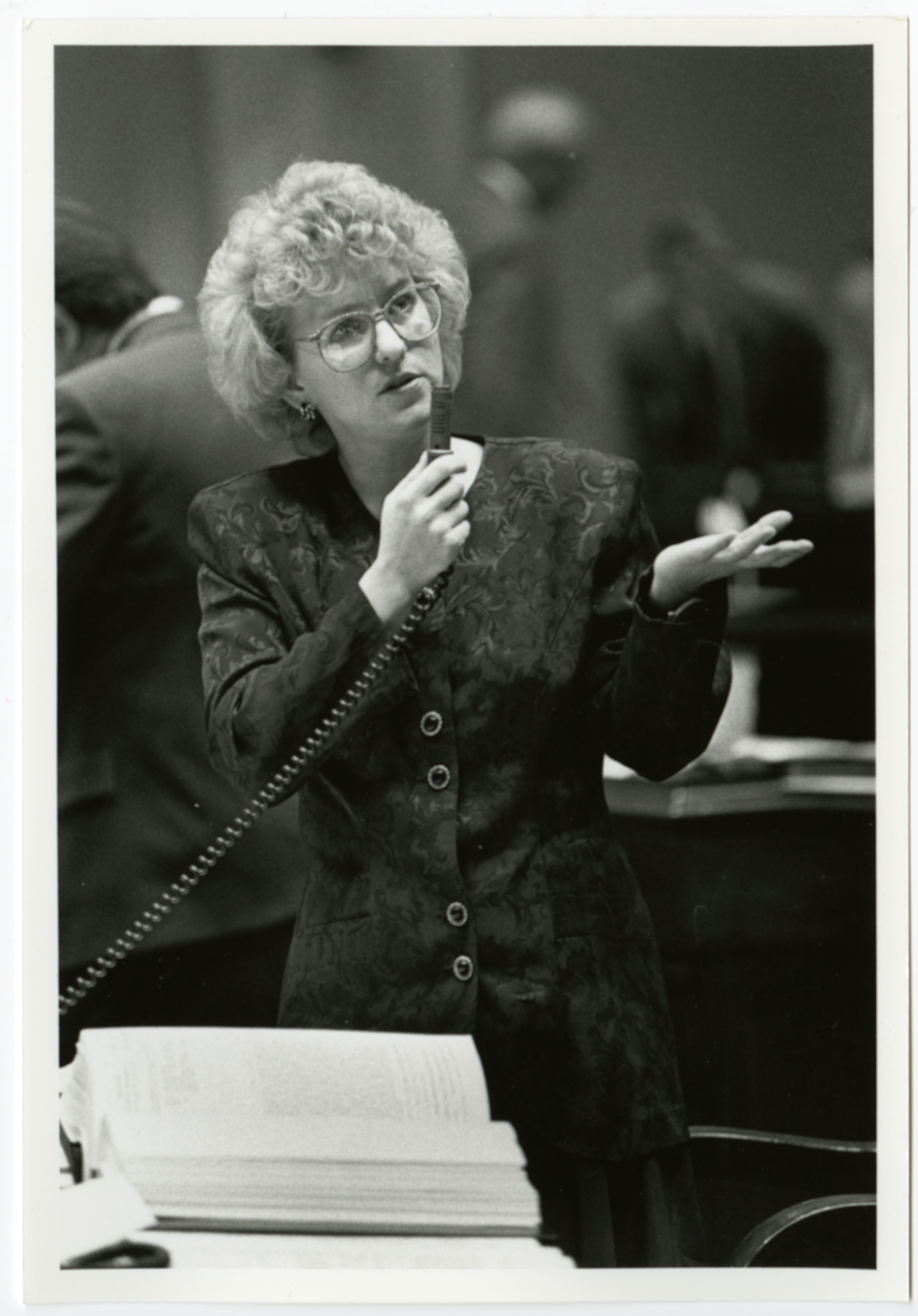

Member of the Minnesota Senate from the 51st district
- In office 1993–2002

Personal details
- Born: December 24, 1952 (age 73) Hennepin County, Minnesota, U.S.
- Party: Minnesota Democratic–Farmer–Labor Party
- Spouse: Gregory Krentz (div.)
- Children: three
- Education: Hamline University, University of Minnesota
- Occupation: teacher

Jane Louise Elizabeth Krentz (born December 24, 1952) is an American politician in the state of Minnesota. She served in the Minnesota State Senate.

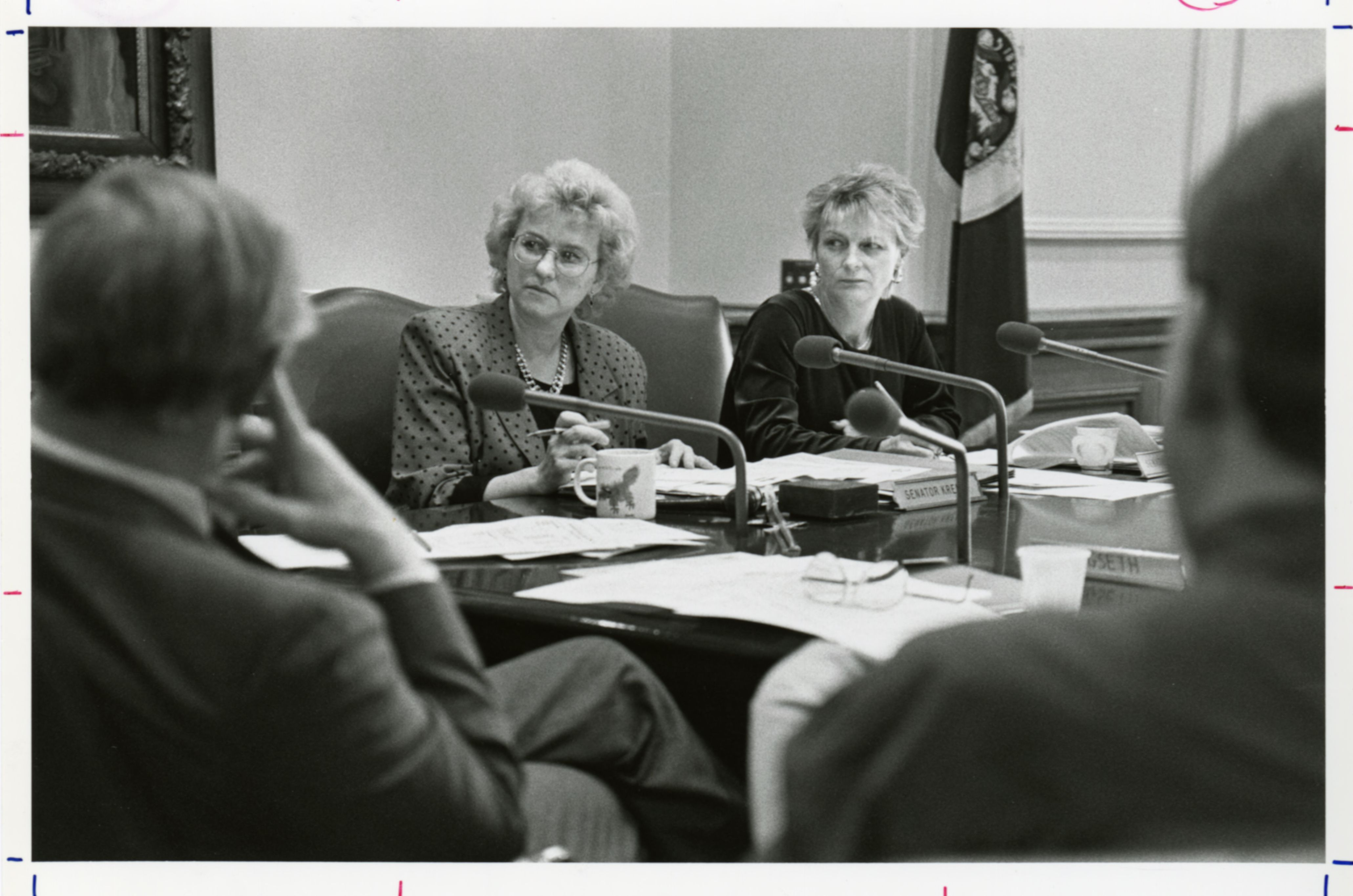
Senator Jane Krentz and Senator Paula Hanson listen during a committee hearing, St. Paul, Minnesota.
