= Tim Commers =

American politician and businessman

Tim Commers (born May 25, 1966) is an American politician and businessman.

Commers lived in Eagan, Minnesota with his wife and family. He graduated from St. Olaf College with a bachelor's degree in history and was a realtor. Commers served as a legislative aide to Vin Weber and Rudy Boschwitz who served in the United States Congress from Minnesota. Commers served in the Minnesota House of Representatives from 1993 until 1998 and was a Republican.
