= Edward C. Oliver =

American politician (1930–2022)

Member of the Minnesota Senate from the 43rd district
- In office 1993–2002

Personal details
- Born: Edward Carl Oliver; May 31, 1930 Saint Paul, Minnesota U.S.
- Died: June 6, 2022 (aged 92)
- Party: Republican
- Spouse: Charlotte
- Children: 3
- Education: University of Minnesota
- Occupation: Investment Sales and Arbitrator

Edward Carl Oliver (May 31, 1930 – June 6, 2022) was an American politician. He served in the Minnesota State Senate from 1993 to 2002. He was also a lawyer by profession.

Oliver was born in Saint Paul, Minnesota. He went to University of Minnesota. He served in the United States Air Force during the Korean War. He was also involved with the insurance business.
