= Jim Rhodes (Minnesota politician) =

American politician

Member of the Minnesota House of Representatives
- In office January 15, 1993 – December 7, 2004
- Preceded by: Gloria Segal
- Succeeded by: Steve Simon
- Constituency: District 44B (1993–2003); District 44A (2003–2004)

Personal details
- Born: James Lionel Rhodes; April 9, 1942 (age 84)
- Party: Republican
- Spouse: Judy
- Children: 2
- Education: University of Minnesota
- Occupation: retail manager

James Lionel Rhodes (born April 9, 1942) is an American politician in the state of Minnesota. A member of the Republican Party, he served in the Minnesota House of Representatives.
