= E.H. Warkentin =

American politician and businessman

Eldon H. Warkentin (March 16, 1933 – June 1, 2025) was an American politician and businessman.

Warkentin was born in Dolton, South Dakota. He lived in Coon Rapids, Minnesota with his wife and family. Warkentin went to the University of Minnesota and was a licensed public accountant. Warkentin served in the Minnesota House of Representatives in 1995 and 1996 and was a Republican.
