= LeRoy Koppendrayer =

American politician

Member of the Minnesota House of Representatives from district 17A
- In office January 5, 1993 – December 8, 1997
- Preceded by: Marcus M. Marsh
- Succeeded by: Sondra Erickson

Member of the Minnesota House of Representatives from district 18A
- In office January 8, 1991 – January 4, 1993
- Preceded by: Jerome P. Peterson
- Succeeded by: Harold F. Lasley

Personal details
- Born: May 22, 1941 (age 85) Princeton, Minnesota
- Party: Republican

Jacob LeRoy "LeRoy" Koppendrayer (born May 22, 1941) is an American politician who served in the Minnesota House of Representatives from 1991 to 1997.

== Career ==
Koppendrayer was appointed to the Minnesota Public Utilities Commission by Governor Arne Carlson in December 1997 and re-appointed by Governor Tim Pawlenty in 2004. His term on the commission ended in 2010.

Before his time in the Minnesota House of Representatives, he worked as a dairy farmer, an agriculture consultant, and a truck driver.
