= Harry Mares =

American educator and politician

Member of the Minnesota House of Representatives from the 55A district
- In office January 3, 1995 – January 6, 2003

Personal details
- Born: December 21, 1938 Racine, Wisconsin, U.S.
- Died: August 5, 2018 (aged 79)
- Party: Republican
- Spouse(s): Susan Theobold (died 1975); Geri Van Bree Arnold
- Children: 7 (3 stepchildren)
- Education: St. Catherine's High School; Loras College (BA); Winona State University (MS)
- Occupation: Politician, educator

Harry Mares (December 21, 1938 – August 5, 2018) was an American educator and politician.

== Biography ==
Mares was born in Racine, Wisconsin. He graduated from St. Catherine's High School in Racine, Wisconsin, in 1958. He received his bachelor's degree in political science, from Loras College and his master's degree in education from Winona State University. He taught social studies and coached football at White Bear Lake High School in White Bear Lake, Minnesota. Mares served on the White Bear Lake City Council and as Mayor of White Bear Lake. From 1995 to 2002, Mares served in the Minnesota House of Representatives as a Republican.
