= Mike Delmont =

American politician and Minnesota State Patrol officer

Mike Delmont (born May 19. 1940) was an American politician and Minnesota State Patrol officer.

Delmont lived in Lexington, Anoka County, Minnesota with his wife and family. He worked as a radio communications coordinator for the Minnesota State Patrol. Delmont served on the Lexington City Council and on the Centennial School District Board in Anoka County. He served in the Minnesota House of Representatives from 1993 to 1998 and was a Democrat.
