= Kevin Goodno =

American politician

Member of the Minnesota House of Representatives from the 9A district
- In office 1991–2002

Personal details
- Born: October 22, 1962 (age 63) Moorhead, Minnesota, U.S.
- Party: Republican
- Spouse: Linda
- Children: 3
- Education: Concordia College; William Mitchell College of Law
- Occupation: government relations professional

Kevin Paul Goodno (born October 22, 1962) is a shareholder at the law firm of Fredrikson & Byron and chair of the Fredrikson Government Relations, a policy and advocacy group, in the state of Minnesota. He serves as government relations advisor for clients both in his areas of special expertise — health care, social services and tax policy — and in a variety of other issue areas including capital bonding, commerce and business, and government reform and efficiency.

Prior to joining Fredrikson, he served as commissioner of Minnesota’s largest agency, the Department of Human Services, and also as a member of the Governor’s Health Cabinet, as co-chair of the Minnesota Mental Health Action Group, as co-chair of the Advisory Council to End Long-Term Homelessness and as a member of the Governor’s Drive to Excellence Sub-Cabinet. Before joining the Department of Human Services, he served in the Minnesota House of Representatives for twelve years, building a distinguished record of leadership on health care, human services and tax policy issues.
