= Sharon Marko =

American politician (born 1953)

Sharon Marko (born March 1953) is an American former candidate for the U.S. House of Representatives from the Second District of Minnesota. She ran for the DFL party nomination, opposite Coleen Rowley, but announced the end of her campaign after less than two months, saying she had entered the race too late and that her current duties in the Minnesota Senate did not leave her enough time to campaign.

Marko's exit left Rowley no significant competitors for the 2nd district DFL candidacy. Rowley won the candidacy, but lost the general election to two-term incumbent Republican congressman John Kline.

Marko entered the race on February 1, 2006, seven months later than her DFL rival, Rowley. Commenting on Rowley, Marko said "I've just noticed the occasional lack of professional ability". She announced her withdrawal from the campaign on March 29.

Marko is a veteran local and state lawmaker. She spent three years on the Clearwater city council, eight years in the Minnesota House, and the past four years in the Minnesota Senate. She has held senior leadership positions in the Minnesota legislature.

Marko is married and has two children. She holds a BA from Indiana University. She lives in Surprise, Arizona, where she served as mayor under her married name of Wolcott until she resigned in 2018 for personal reasons.
