= Rob Leighton =

American politician

Member of the Minnesota House of Representatives from the 27B district
- In office 1995–2002

Personal details
- Born: July 7, 1965 (age 61) Austin, Minnesota, U.S.
- Party: Minnesota Democratic–Farmer–Labor Party
- Spouse: Anna Youngerman
- Children: Taylor, Tanner, Leo and Ryan
- Education: University of Minnesota, University of California, Berkeley
- Occupation: attorney

Robert Leighton Jr. (born July 7, 1965) is an American politician in the state of Minnesota. He served in the Minnesota House of Representatives.
