= Linda Wejcman =

American politician

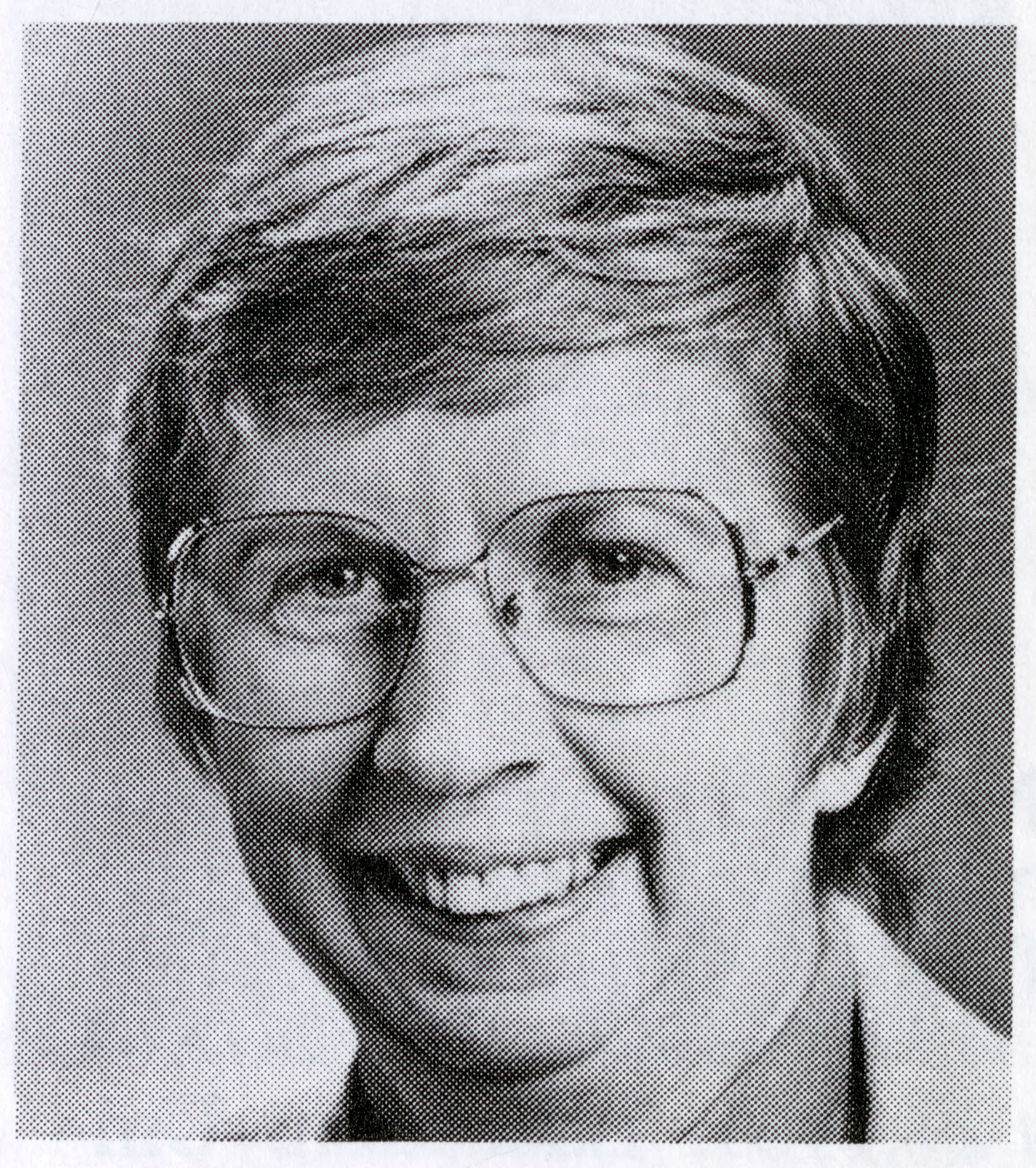

Member of the Minnesota House of Representatives
- In office 1991–2000
- Preceded by: Peter McLaughlin

Personal details
- Born: December 9, 1939 Spencer, Iowa, U.S.
- Died: February 22, 2010 (aged 70) Minneapolis, Minnesota, U.S.
- Party: Democratic
- Education: Iowa State University

Linda Wejcman (December 9, 1939 – February 22, 2010) was an American politician who served as a member of the Minnesota House of Representatives from 1991 to 2000.

== Background ==
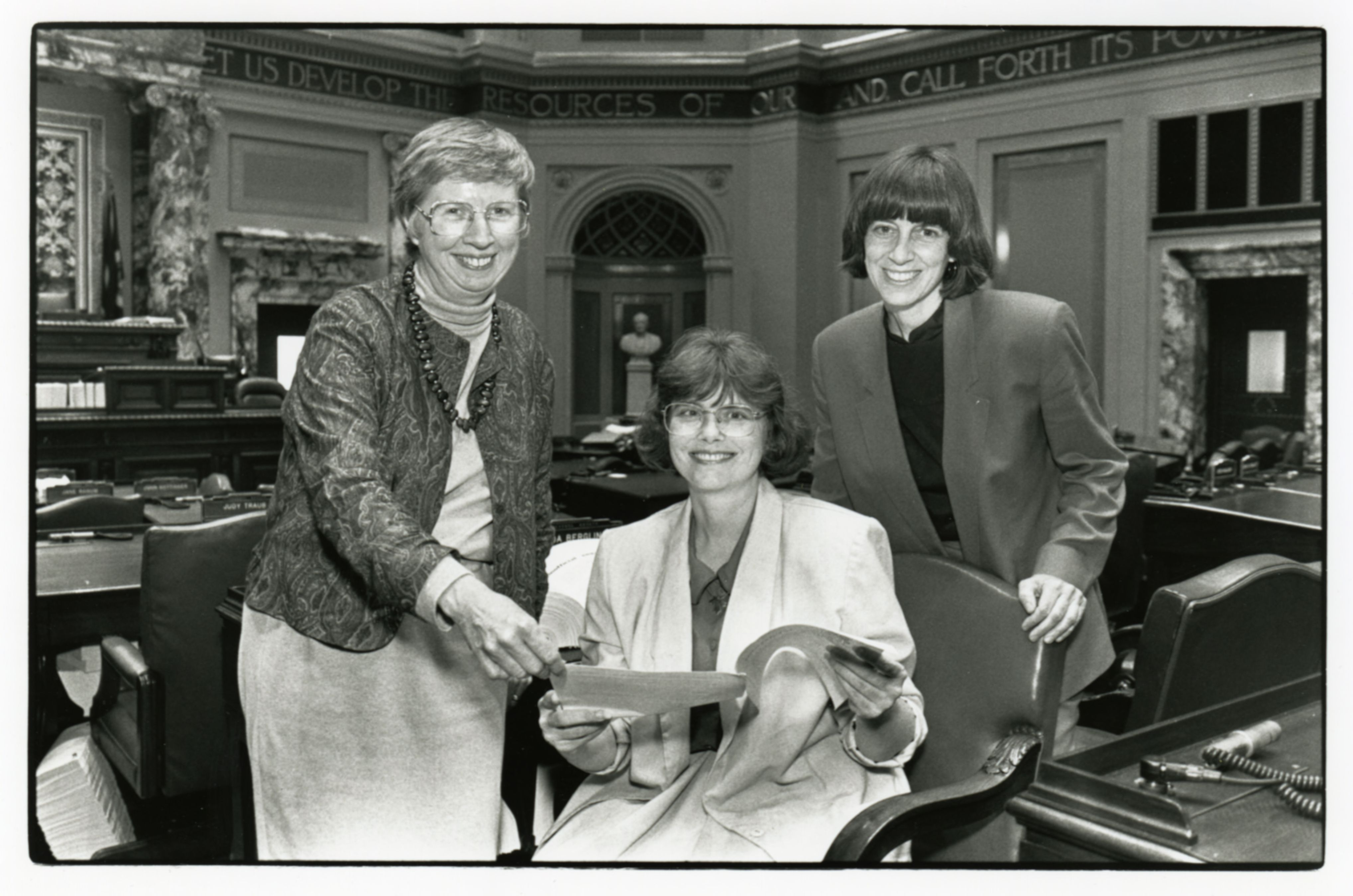
Representative Linda Wejcman poses with Representative Karen Clark and Senator Linda Berglin in the Senate Chamber, St. Paul, Minnesota.

Born in Spencer, Iowa, Wejcman attended Iowa State University. She moved to Minneapolis, Minnesota in 1972 and was a consultant and community activist. Wejcman served in the Minnesota House of Representatives as a Democrat from 1991 to 2000, She died of leukemia in Minneapolis, Minnesota.
