= Hilda Bettermann =

American politician (1942–2023)

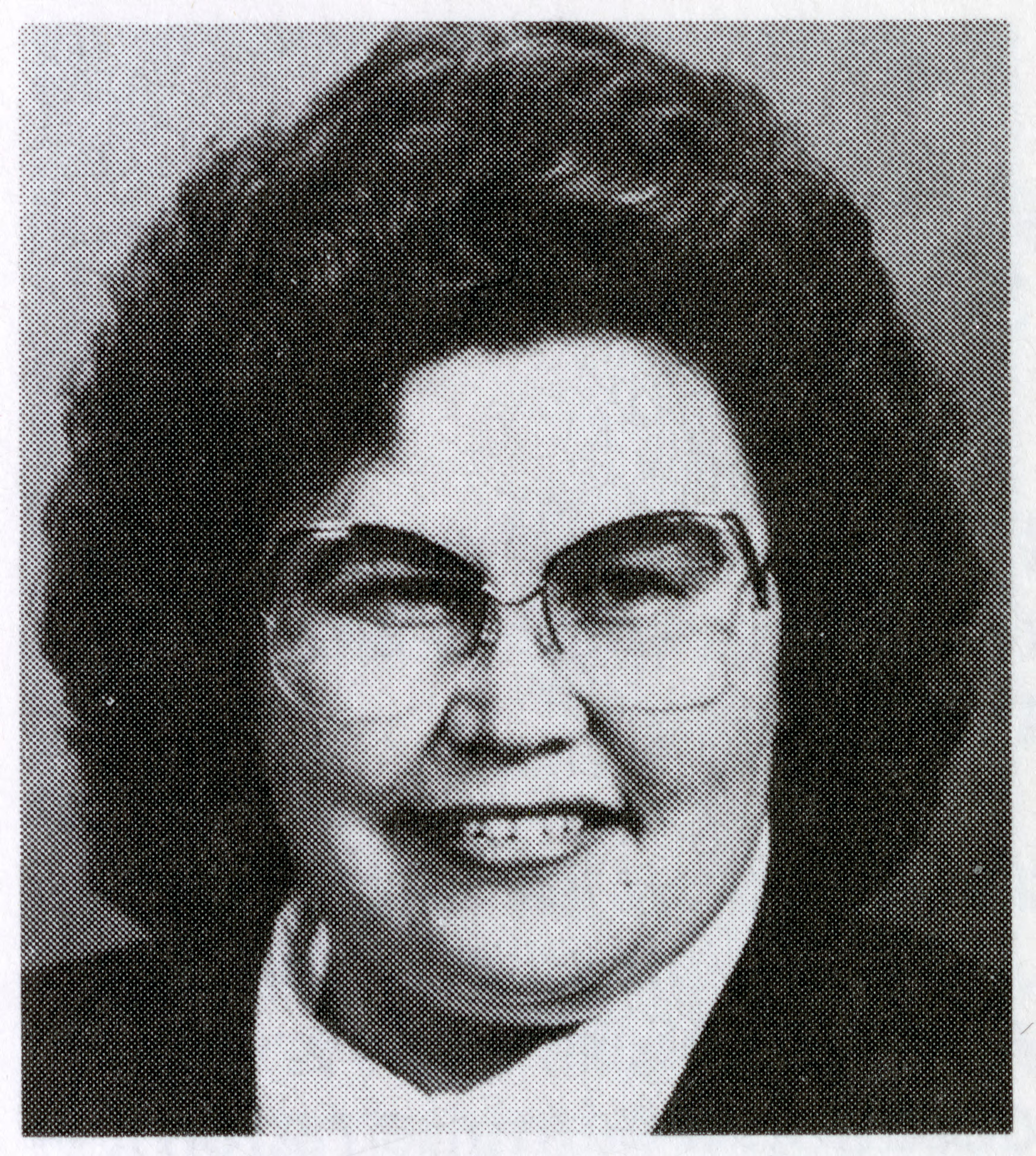

Member of the Minnesota House of Representatives from district 10B
- In office January 5, 1993 – January 4, 1999
- Preceded by: Robert A. Anderson
- Succeeded by: George Cassell Sr.

Member of the Minnesota House of Representatives from district 11B
- In office January 8, 1991 – January 4, 1993
- Preceded by: Clair L. Nelson
- Succeeded by: Rick Krueger

Personal details
- Born: October 22, 1942 Brandon, Minnesota, U.S.
- Died: January 28, 2023 (aged 80) Alexandria, Minnesota, U.S.
- Party: Republican

Hilda Bettermann (October 22, 1942 – January 28, 2023) was an American politician who served in the Minnesota House of Representatives from 1991 to 1999.

Bettermann died on January 23, 2023, at the age of 80. She was living in Diamond Willow assistant living and memory care in Alexandria, Minnesota, at her time of death. Bettermann was a Lutheran.
