= Mark P. Mahon =

American politician

Mark P. Mahon (April 24, 1930 – September 7, 2017) was an American politician.

Mahon grew up in Winsted, Minnesota. He served in the United States Air Force during the Korean War. In 1959, he moved to Bloomington, Minnesota and worked at International Harvester. He was active with the United Auto Workers. Mahon served on the Bloomington City Council from 1979 to 1993. He then served, as a Democrat, in the Minnesota House of Representatives from 1993 to 1998. Mahon died in Bloomington, aged 87.
