= Leslie Schumacher =

American politician

Member of the Minnesota House of Representatives from the 17B district
- In office 1993–2002

Personal details
- Born: October 4, 1955 (age 71) New Hope, Minnesota, U.S.
- Party: Minnesota Democratic–Farmer–Labor Party
- Spouse: Byron
- Children: two
- Education: St. Cloud State University
- Occupation: artist, truck driver (former)

Leslie J. Schumacher (born October 4, 1955) is an American politician in the state of Minnesota. She served in the Minnesota House of Representatives.
