= Roxann Daggett =

American politician (born 1947)

Member of the Minnesota House of Representatives from the 11A district
- In office 1995–2002

Personal details
- Born: March 10, 1947 (age 79) Lincoln County, Minnesota, U.S.
- Party: Republican
- Spouse: Dave
- Children: 2
- Education: University of North Dakota
- Occupation: Motivational Speaker

Roxann Maris Daggett (born March 10, 1947) is an American politician in the state of Minnesota. She served in the Minnesota House of Representatives.
