= Elaine Harder =

American politician and businesswoman

Elaine Rupp Harder
- Born: December 27, 1947; Windom, Minnesota
- Died: September 24, 2013 (aged 65); St. Anthony, Minnesota
- Education: Minnesota State University, Mankato
- Occupations: politician, businesswoman
- Office: Member of the Minnesota House of Representatives
- Term: 1995–2004
- Political party: Republican

Elaine Rupp Harder (December 27, 1947 – September 24, 2013) was an American politician and businesswoman. She served in the Minnesota House of Representatives from 1995 until 2004 as a member of the Republican Party.

== Early life and education ==
Born in Windom, Minnesota, Harder pursued her higher education at Minnesota State University, Mankato, where she received her bachelor's degree.

== Career ==
Harder worked in various roles including a home economics teacher, a sales representative for a printing and office supplies company, and a sales and marketing agent for a family cattle company. Additionally, she served as a 4-H youth development agent with the University of Minnesota Extension Service in Cottonwood County, where she has been involved since her youth.

== Political career ==
In 1995, Harder embarked on her political career when she was elected to the Minnesota House of Representatives, where she served until 2004. As a representative, she was known for her contributions to the state legislature as a member of the Republican Party.

== Personal life ==
Harder lived in Jackson, Minnesota where she and her husband, who ran unsuccessfully for the state Senate in 1990, owned and operated an insurance agency. She was a Lutheran and sang in her church choir.

== Death ==
Harder died on September 24, 2013, in St. Anthony, Minnesota.
