= Barbara Vickerman =

American businesswoman and politician

Barbara Lou "Barb" Vickerman
- Born: October 26, 1933; Tracy, Minnesota, US
- Died: December 22, 1997 (aged 64); Redwood Falls, Minnesota, US
- Occupations: Businesswoman, Politician
- Office: Member of the Minnesota House of Representatives
- Term: 1993–1997
- Political party: Republican

Barbara Lou "Barb" Vickerman (née Gilb; October 26, 1933 – December 22, 1997) was an American businesswoman and politician. She served in the Minnesota House of Representatives as a Republican from 1993 until her death in 1997.

== Early life and education ==
Born in Tracy, Minnesota, Vickerman attended a vocational school and trained as a medical laboratory technician.

== Business career ==
Vickerman was an entrepreneur, owning a card and gift shop. Alongside her husband, she co-owned a bowling alley in Redwood Falls, Minnesota.

== Political career ==
Vickerman's political career began in 1993 when she was elected to the Minnesota House of Representatives, representing the Republican Party. She continued to serve in this capacity until her death in 1997. During her tenure, she was known for her dedication to public service and addressing the concerns of her constituents.

== Personal life ==
Barb Vickerman was related to another notable Minnesota legislator, her cousin-in-law Jim Vickerman, who also served in the Minnesota Legislature. She was a Lutheran.

== Death ==
Vickerman died on December 22, 1997, in Redwood Falls, Minnesota, after a battle with cancer.
