= Deanna Wiener =

American politician

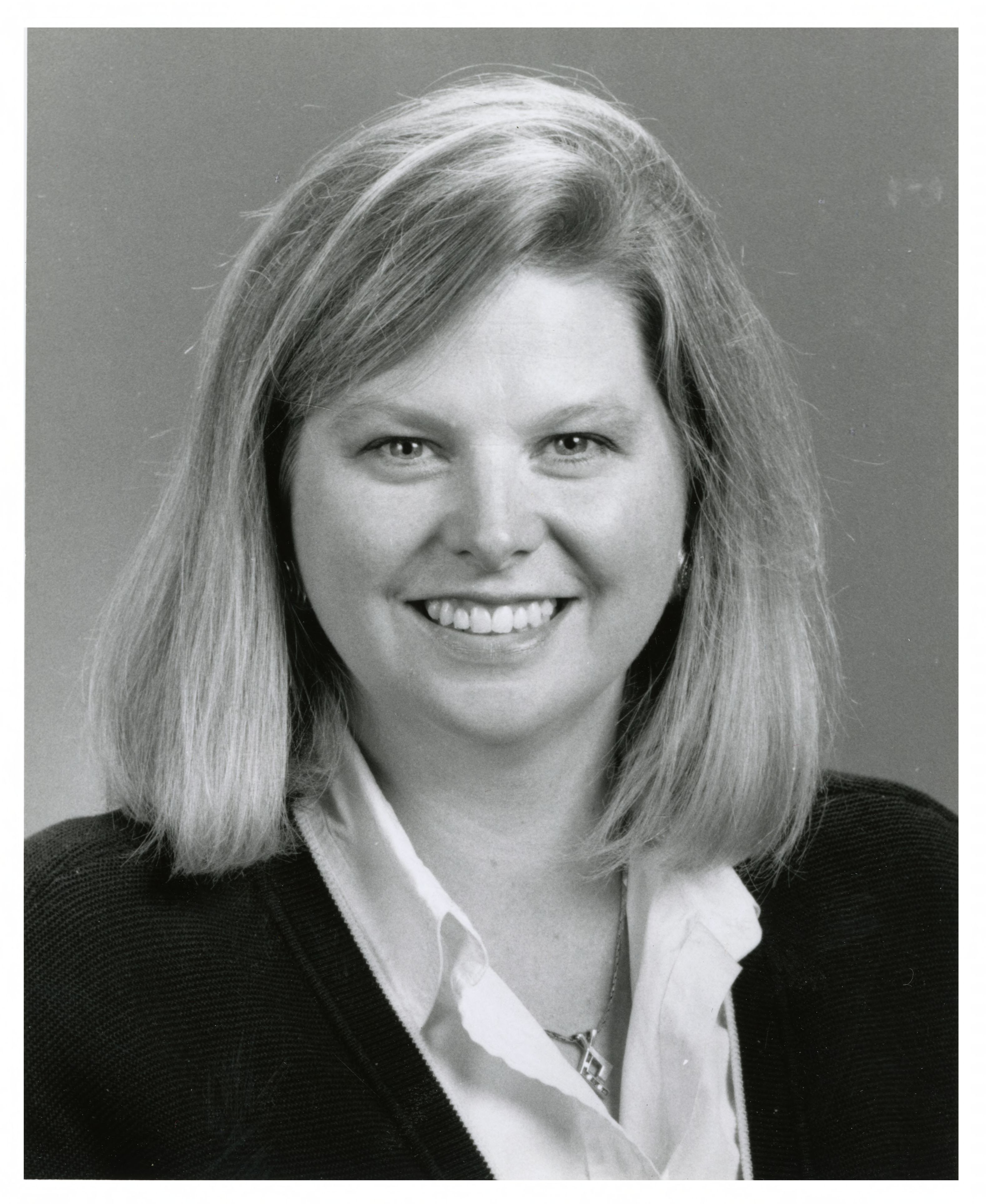

Member of the Minnesota Senate from the 38th district
- In office 1993–2002

Personal details
- Born: March 23, 1953 (age 73) Ramsey County, Minnesota, U.S.
- Party: Democratic (DFL)
- Spouse: Jim Tilsen
- Children: 3
- Education: St. Mary's Junior College
- Occupation: Real estate

Deanna Lynne Wiener (born March 23, 1953) is an American politician in the state of Minnesota. She served in the Minnesota State Senate and is a Democrat.

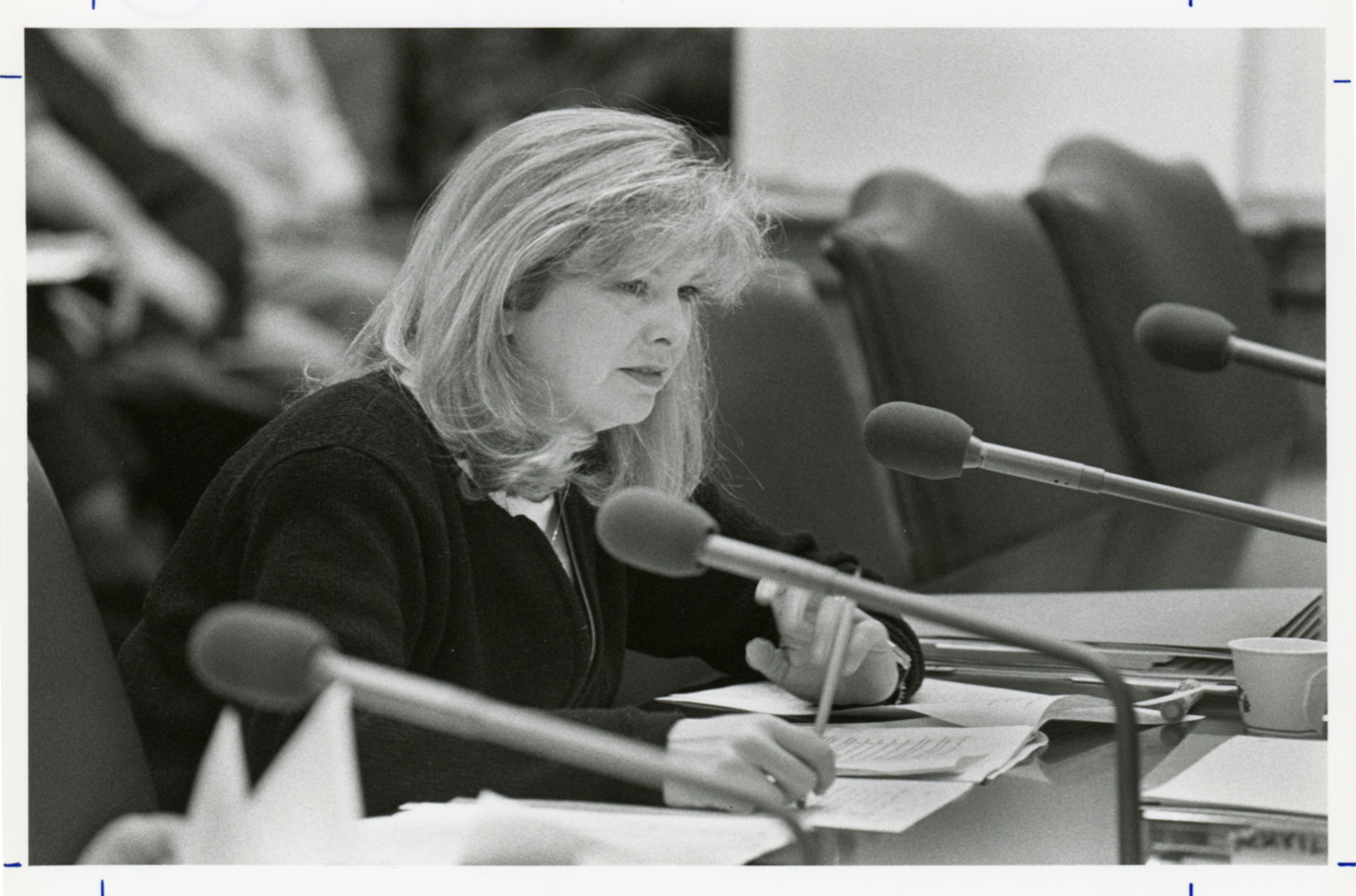
Senator Deanna Wiener speaks in committee, St. Paul, Minnesota
