= Carol Flynn =

American politician

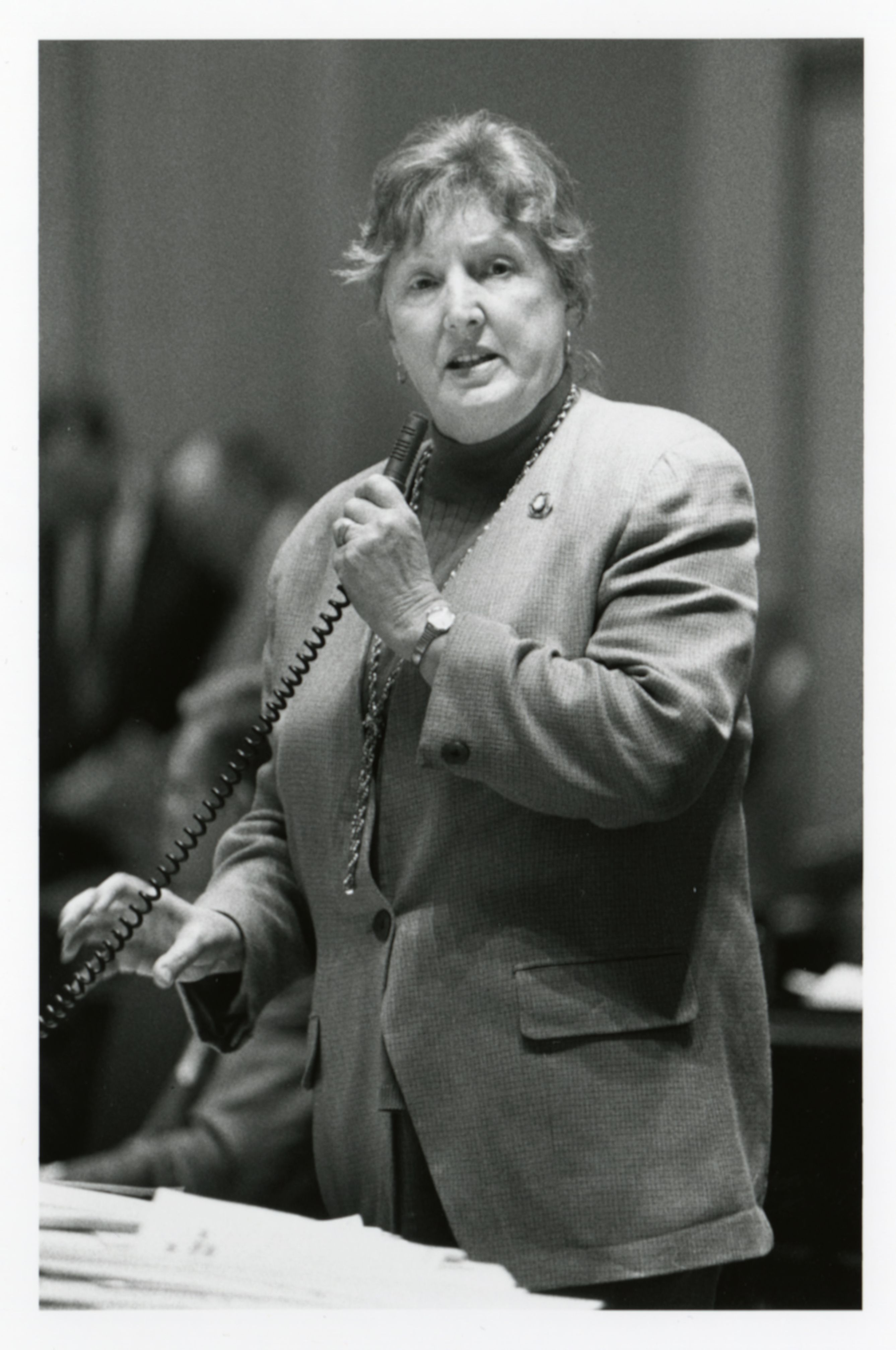

Member of the Minnesota Senate from the 62nd district
- In office January 5, 1993 – January 2, 2001
- Preceded by: Jane Ranum
- Succeeded by: Julie Sabo

Member of the Minnesota Senate from the 61st district
- In office February 15, 1990 – January 4, 1993
- Preceded by: Donna C. Peterson
- Succeeded by: Linda Berglin

Personal details
- Born: August 7, 1933 (age 92)
- Party: Democratic

Carol Flynn (born August 7, 1933) is an American politician who served in the Minnesota Senate from 1990 to 2001.
