= Peggy Leppik =

American politician (born 1943)

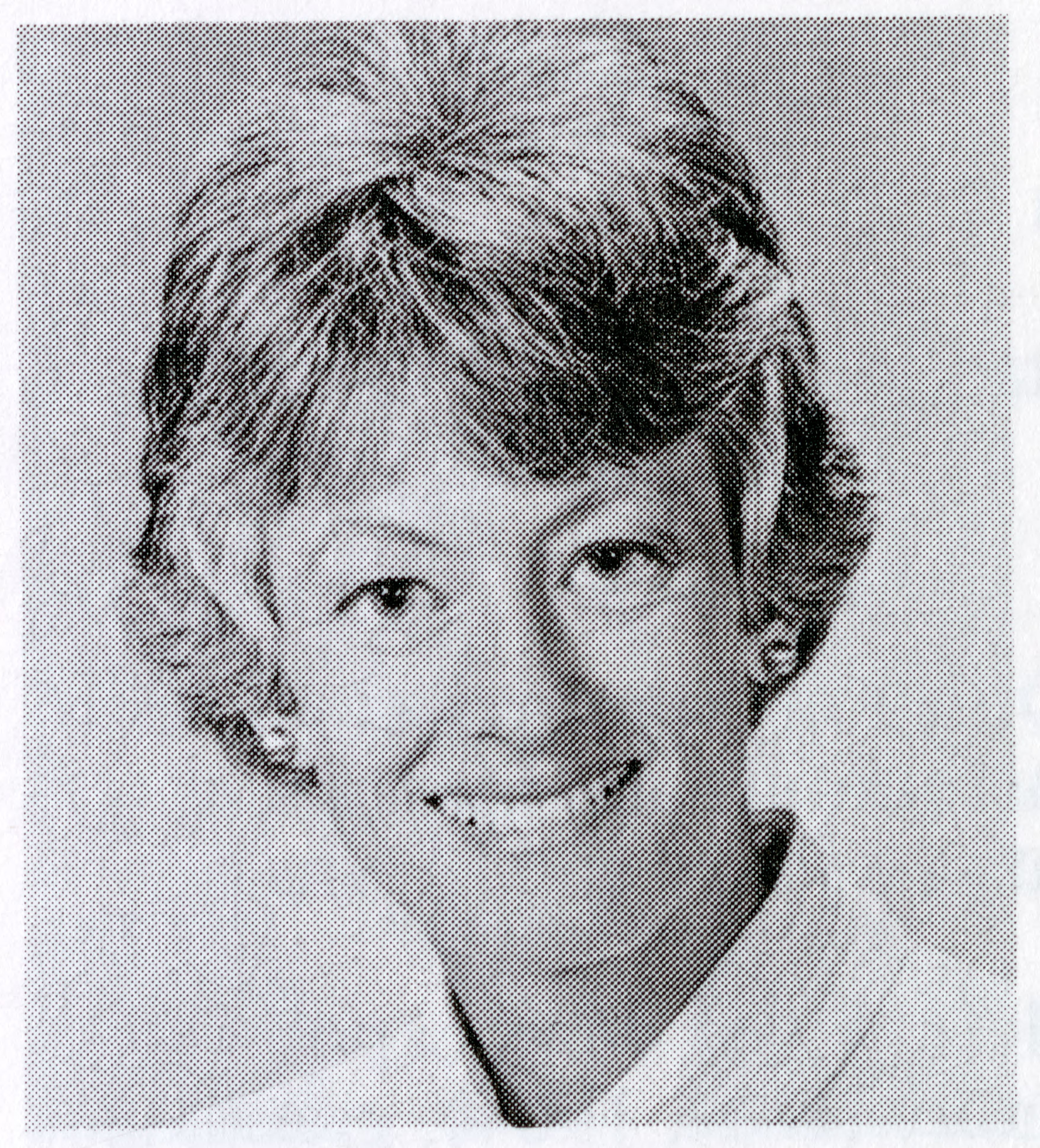

Member of the Minnesota House of Representatives from the 45B district
- In office 1991–2002

Personal details
- Born: June 5, 1943 (age 83) New Jersey, U.S.
- Party: Republican
- Spouse: Ilo
- Children: 3
- Education: Smith College; University of Pennsylvania

Margaret Leppik (born June 5, 1943) is an American politician in the state of Minnesota. She served in the Minnesota House of Representatives.
