= Bill Macklin =

American lawyer

William E. "Bill" Macklin (born December 29, 1945) was an American judge and politician.

Macklin lived in Lakeville, Minnesota with his wife and children. He received his bachelor's degree in theatre arts from the University of Minnesota in 1968 and his Juris Doctor degree from the Mitchell Hamline School of Law in 1975. He was admitted to the Minnesota bar. Macklin served in the Minnesota House of Representatives from 1989 to 1998 and was a Republican. He also served as a district court judge for Scott County, Minnesota.
