= Jane Ranum =

American politician (born 1947)

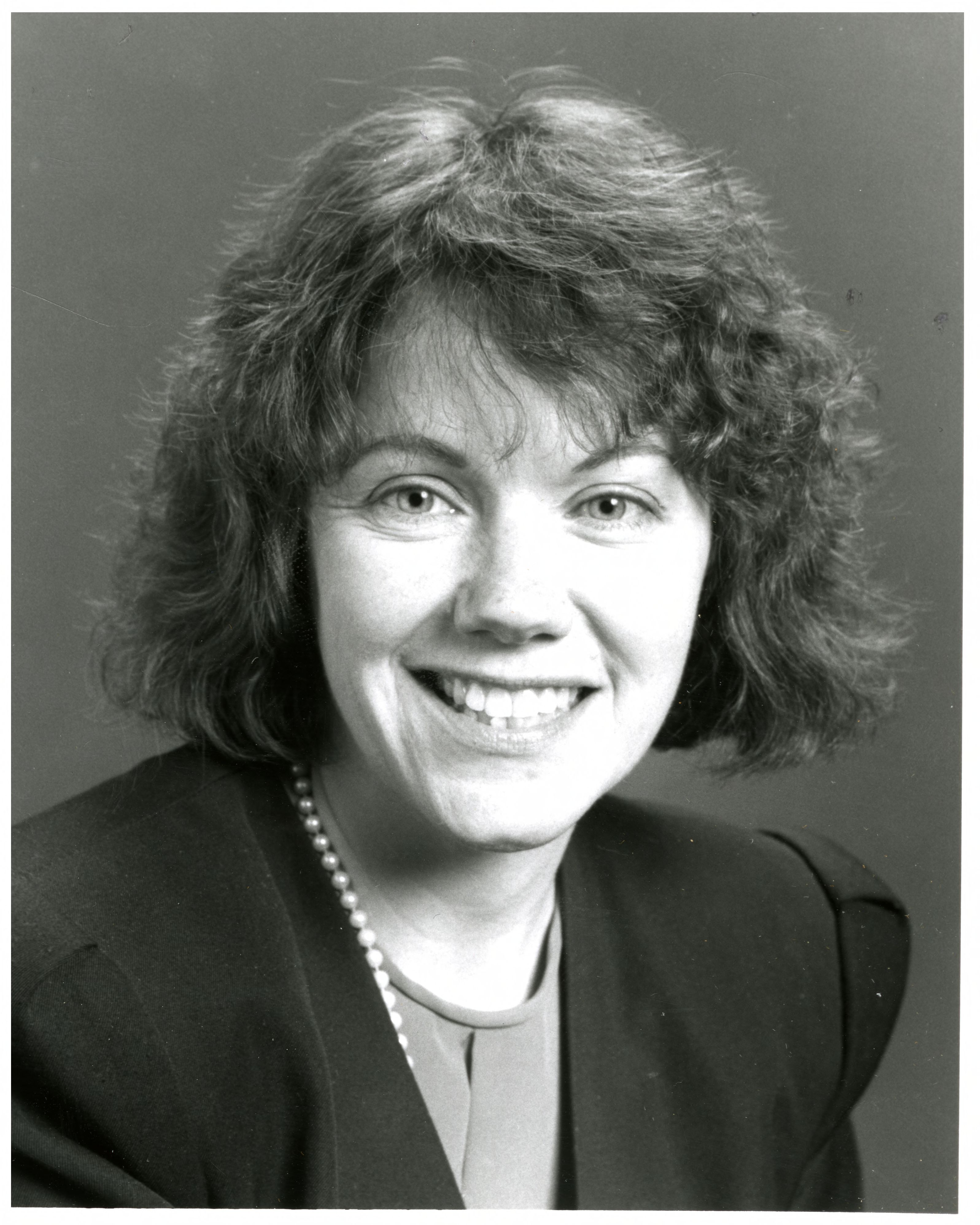

Member of the Minnesota Senate from the 63rd district
- In office January 5, 1993 – January 2, 2007
- Preceded by: John Marty
- Succeeded by: Dan Larson

Member of the Minnesota Senate from the 62nd district
- In office January 8, 1991 – January 4, 1993
- Preceded by: John Brandl
- Succeeded by: Carol Flynn

Personal details
- Born: August 21, 1947 (age 78) Charlotte, North Carolina, U.S.
- Party: Democratic

Jane Ranum (born August 21, 1947) is an American politician who served in the Minnesota Senate from 1991 to 2007.

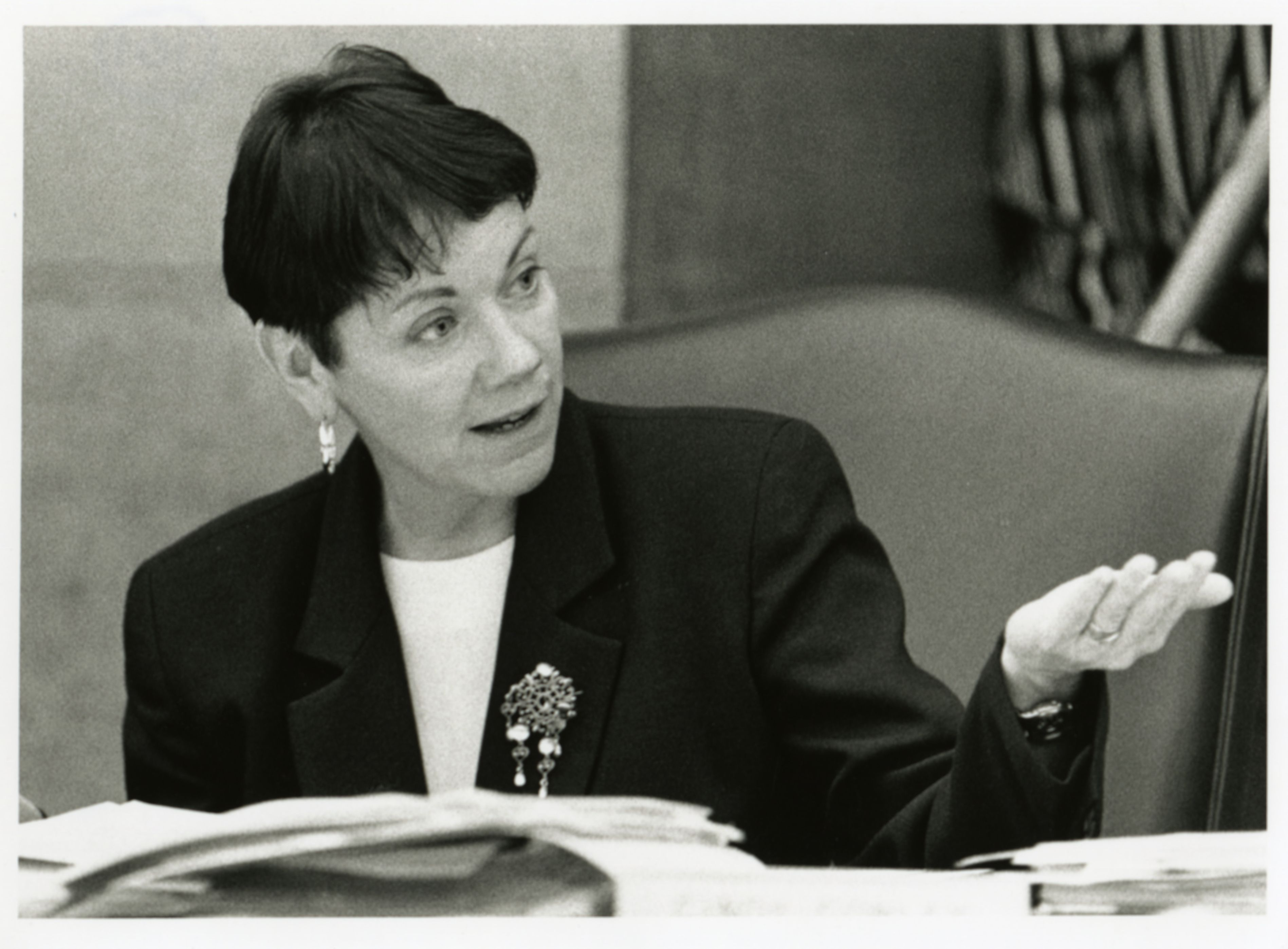
Senator Jane Ranum speaks in committee, St. Paul, Minnesota.
