= Lynda Boudreau =

American politician

Member of the Minnesota House of Representatives from the 26B district
- In office 2003–2004

Member of the Minnesota House of Representatives from the 25B district
- In office 1995–2002

Personal details
- Born: March 9, 1952 (age 74) Faribault, Minnesota, U.S.
- Party: Republican
- Spouse: Jim
- Children: 3
- Education: Inver Hills Community College (attended)
- Occupation: clerk, health aide

Lynda Boudreau (born March 9, 1952) is an American politician in the state of Minnesota. She served in the Minnesota House of Representatives.
