= Paula Hanson =

American politician (born 1944)

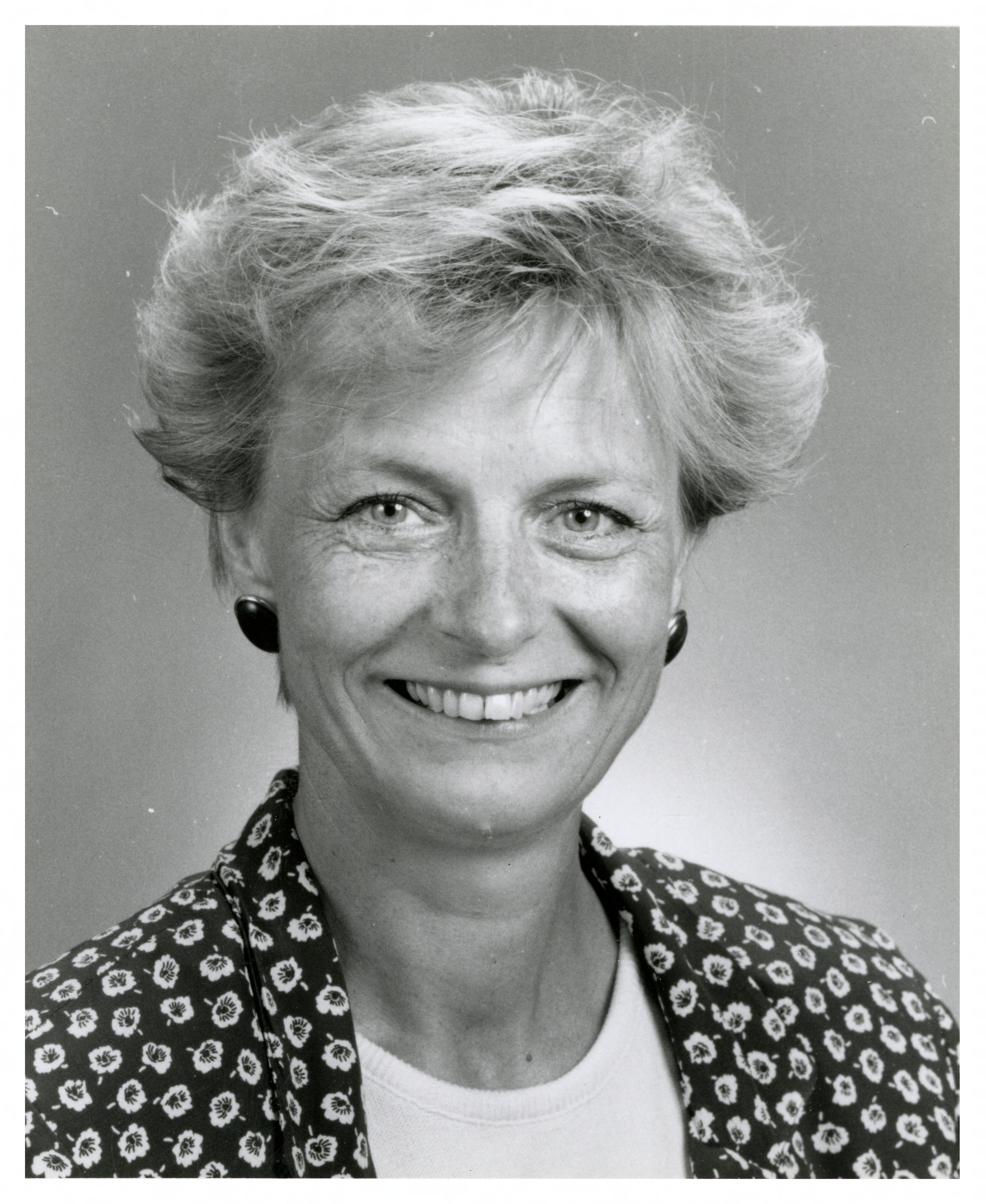

Member of the Minnesota Senate from the 50th district
- In office 1993–2000

Personal details
- Born: January 21, 1944 (age 82) Lyon County, Minnesota, U.S.
- Party: Minnesota Democratic–Farmer–Labor Party
- Spouse: Jim
- Children: three

Paula Elodie Hanson (born January 21, 1944) is an American politician in the state of Minnesota. She served in the Minnesota State Senate.
