= Doug Peterson (Minnesota politician) =

American politician (born 1948)

Member of the Minnesota House of Representatives from the 13B district
- In office 1993–2002

Member of the Minnesota House of Representatives from the 20A district
- In office 1991–1992

Personal details
- Born: October 15, 1948 (age 77) Madison, Minnesota, U.S.
- Party: Minnesota Democratic–Farmer–Labor Party
- Spouse: Eloise
- Children: two
- Education: Augustana College
- Occupation: teacher, farmer

Douglas Paul Peterson (born October 15, 1948) is an American politician in the state of Minnesota. He served in the Minnesota House of Representatives.
