= Janet Johnson (politician) =

American politician

Janet B. Johnson
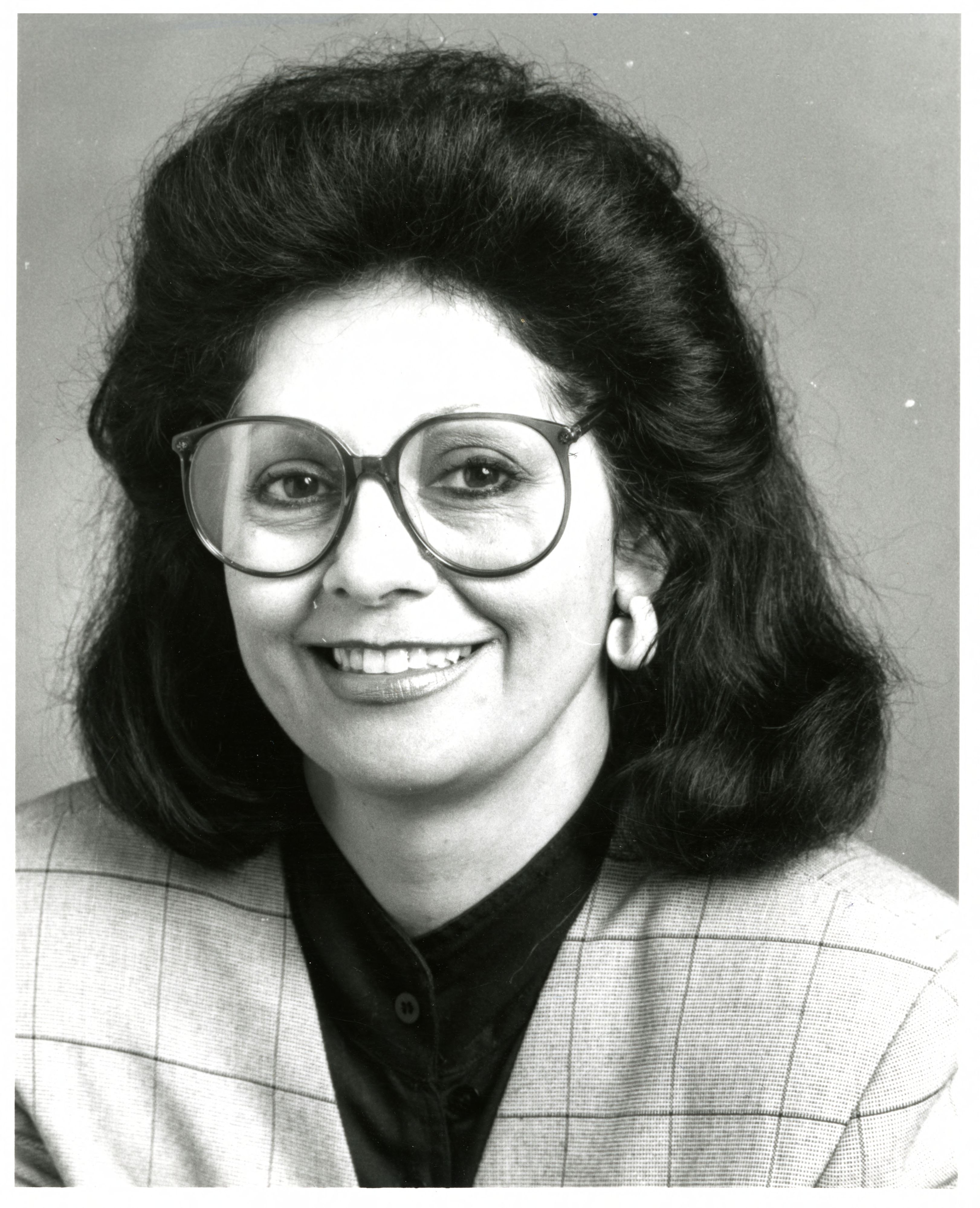

Member of the Minnesota Senate from the 18th district
- In office January 5, 1993 – August 21, 1999
- Preceded by: Charles R. Davis

Member of the Minnesota Senate from the 19th district
- In office January 8, 1991 – January 4, 1993
- Succeeded by: Betty A. Adkins

Personal details
- Born: March 5, 1940 New York City, U.S.
- Died: August 21, 1999 (aged 59) Saint Paul, Minnesota, U.S.
- Party: DFL
- Education: University of Minnesota
- Profession: Small Business Owner

Janet B. Johnson (March 5, 1940 – August 21, 1999) was an American politician. Born in The Bronx, New York City, New York, Johnson moved to Minnesota in 1960 and went to University of Minnesota. Johnson was a business owner. She served on the North Branch, Minnesota School Board and was involved with the Democratic Party. Johnson served in the Minnesota Senate from 1991 until her death in 1999. Johnson died of brain cancer in a hospital in Saint Paul, Minnesota. She was a Lutheran.
