= Roy Terwilliger =

American politician (born 1937)

Member of the Minnesota Senate from the 42nd district
- In office 1992–2002

Personal details
- Born: June 20, 1937 (age 89) Winfred, South Dakota, U.S.
- Party: Republican
- Spouse: Mary Lou
- Children: 3
- Education: University of South Dakota, University of Iowa
- Occupation: banker

Roy Terwilliger (born June 20, 1937) is an American politician in the state of Minnesota. He served in the Minnesota State Senate.
