= Sherry Broecker =

American politician

Member of the Minnesota House of Representatives from district 53B
- In office January 3, 1995 – January 2, 2001
- Preceded by: Marc Asch
- Succeeded by: Carl Jacobson

Personal details
- Born: February 14, 1951 (age 75)
- Party: Republican

Sherry Broecker (born February 14, 1951) is an American politician who served in the Minnesota House of Representatives from district 53B from 1995 to 2001.
