= Fran Bradley =

American politician

Member of the Minnesota House of Representatives from the 29B district
- In office 2003–2006

Member of the Minnesota House of Representatives from the 30A district
- In office 1995–2002

Personal details
- Born: June 13, 1942 (age 84) Ivanhoe, Minnesota, U.S.
- Party: Republican
- Spouse: Mary
- Children: 4
- Education: South Dakota State University, University of Minnesota
- Occupation: computer engineer

Francis Anthony Bradley (born June 13, 1942) is an American politician in the state of Minnesota. He served in the Minnesota House of Representatives.
