= Peg Larsen =

American politician (born 1949)

Member of the Minnesota House of Representatives from the 56B district
- In office 1995–2000

Personal details
- Born: August 10, 1949 (age 77) Pittsburgh, Pennsylvania, U.S.
- Party: Republican
- Spouse: Thomas
- Children: 4
- Education: Slippery Rock University of Pennsylvania
- Occupation: educator

Peg Larsen (born August 10, 1949) is an American politician in the state of Minnesota. She served in the Minnesota House of Representatives.
