= Lee Greenfield =

American politician (1941–2023)

Member of the Minnesota House of Representatives
- In office 1979–2001

Assistant to the Hennepin County Board of Commissioners
- In office 2001–2008

Personal details
- Born: July 29, 1941 Brooklyn, New York
- Died: February 7, 2023 (aged 81)
- Party: Democratic
- Education: University of Minnesota
- Occupation: Lobbyist

Leen "Lee" Greenfield (July 29, 1941 – February 7, 2023) was an American politician.

Born in Brooklyn, New York, Greenfield received his bachelor's degree in physics from Purdue University. He also studied at the University of Minnesota. Greenfield was a health policy lobbyist and lived in Minneapolis, Minnesota. From 1979 to 2001, Greenfield served in the Minnesota House of Representatives and was a Democrat. From 2001 to 2008, Greenfield served as an assistant for the Hennepin County, Minnesota Board of Commissioners.

== Career as legislator ==
As a member of the Minnesota House in 1982, Greenfield co-sponsored the Acid Deposition Control Act, to regulate acid rain in Minnesota. The bill was also sponsored by Willard Munger and Gary W. Laidig.
