= Arlene Lesewski =

American politician (1936–2026)

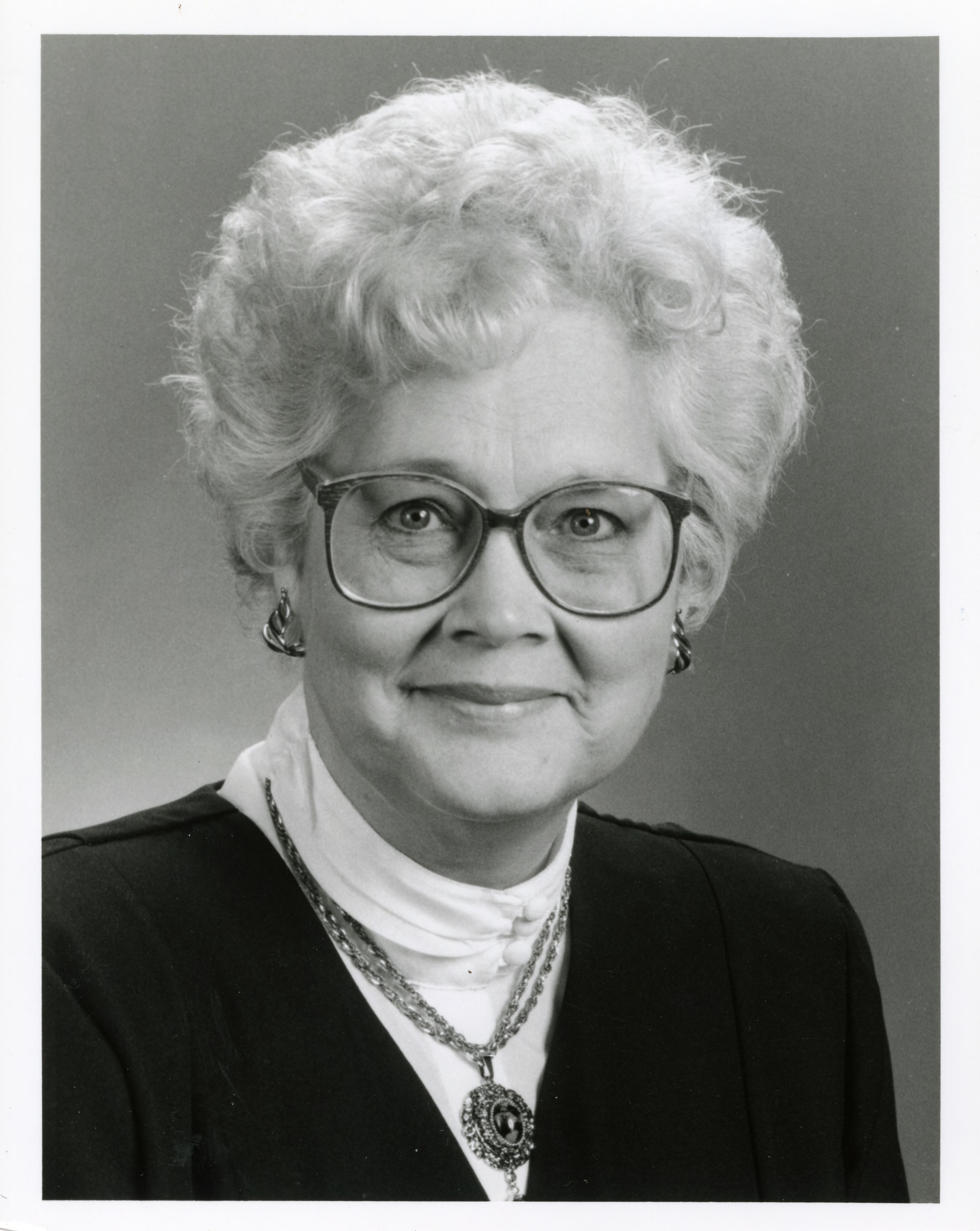

Member of the Minnesota Senate from the 21st district
- In office 1993–2002

Personal details
- Born: Arlene Julia Dau; April 12, 1936 Lyon County, Minnesota, U.S.
- Died: October 22, 2026 (aged 90) Marshall, Minnesota, U.S.
- Party: Republican
- Spouse: Thomas Lesewski
- Children: 3
- Education: Southwest State University
- Occupation: Insurance Agent

Arlene Julia Lesewski (April 12, 1936 – October 22, 2026) was an American politician in the state of Minnesota. She served in the Minnesota State Senate. Lesewski died in Marshall, Minnesota, on October 22, 2026, at the age of 90.
