= John Tuma =

American politician

Member of the Minnesota House of Representatives from the 25A district
- In office 1995–2002

Personal details
- Born: September 25, 1962 (age 64) Rice County, Minnesota, U.S.
- Party: Republican
- Spouse: Wendy
- Children: two
- Education: Mankato State University, University of Minnesota Law School
- Occupation: attorney

John Arlos Tuma (born September 25, 1962) is an American lawyer and politician in the state of Minnesota. He served in the Minnesota House of Representatives. In 2015 Governor Mark Dayton appointed Tuma to the Minnesota Public Utilities Commission.
