= Jim Rostberg =

American politician

Member of the Minnesota House of Representatives from the 18A district
- In office 1995–2000

Personal details
- Born: May 28, 1956 (age 70) Kanabec County, Minnesota
- Party: Republican Party of Minnesota
- Spouse: Kathy
- Children: two
- Education: Metropolitan State University
- Occupation: Veterans Service Officer and Emergency Management Officer

James Ivar Rostberg (born May 28, 1956) is an American Republican politician from Isanti in the state of Minnesota. He served in the Minnesota House of Representatives as the State Representative from Isanti.

He was arrested and charged with fondling the breast of a 13 year old girl and arrested for sexual contact. He admitted his actions and was ordered to make a full admission in juvenile court of the elements of the charged offense. At that time, Rostberg agreed not to run for reelection. The case was then dismissed and the files sealed. (2000)
