= Mike Osskopp =

American politician

Member of the Minnesota House of Representatives from the 29B district
- In office 1995–2002

Personal details
- Born: October 3, 1951 (age 75)
- Party: Republican
- Children: 4
- Education: Institute of Broadcast Arts; Moody Bible Institute
- Occupation: broadcaster

Michael Osskopp (born October 3, 1951) is an American politician in the state of Minnesota. He served in the Minnesota House of Representatives.
