= Bill Haas (Minnesota politician) =

American politician

Member of the Minnesota House of Representatives from the 47A district
- In office 2003–2004

Member of the Minnesota House of Representatives from the 48A district
- In office 1995–2002

Personal details
- Born: June 25, 1949 (age 77) Burbank, California, U.S.
- Party: Republican
- Spouse: Joenie
- Children: 2
- Education: University of Minnesota
- Occupation: Broker, Consultant

Bill Haas (born June 25, 1949) is an American politician in the state of Minnesota. He served in the Minnesota House of Representatives.
