= Gene Hugoson =

American politician, farmer and teacher

Gene Hugoson (born September 11, 1945) was an American politician, farmer, and teacher.

Hugoson was born in Martin County, Minnesota. He graduated from the East Chain High School in East Chain, Minnesota in 1963. Hugoson served in the United States Army during the Vietnam War. He received his bachelor's degree in social studies in 1967 from Augsburg University and then went to Minnesota State University, Mankato, from 1971 to 1974 for graduated work. Hugoson taught social studies in high schools in Lakefield, Minnesota and St. James, Minnesota. Hugoson lived in Granada, Minnesota with his wife and family. Hugoson served in the Minnesota House of Representatives from 1987 to 1995 and was a Republican. He served as Commissioner of the Minnesota Department of Agriculture from 1995 to 2011
