= Walters, Minnesota =

City in Minnesota, United States

Walters
- City
- Location of Walters, Minnesota
- Coordinates: 43°36′18″N 93°40′28″W
- Country: United States
- State: Minnesota
- County: Faribault

Area
  - Total: 0.202 sq mi (0.523 km^{2})
  - Land: 0.202 sq mi (0.523 km^{2})
  - Water: 0 sq mi (0.00 km^{2})
- Elevation: 1,257 ft (383 m)

Population (2020)
  - Total: 69
  - Density: 343.7/sq mi (132.72/km^{2})
- Time zone: UTC-6 (Central (CST))
  - Summer (DST): UTC-5 (CDT)
- ZIP code: 56097
- Area code: 507
- FIPS code: 27-67900
- GNIS feature ID: 2397184

Walters is a city in Faribault County, Minnesota, United States. As of the 2020 census, Walters had a population of 69.

== History ==
A post office called Walters was established in 1901, and remained in operation until it was discontinued in 1996. The city was named for a railroad official.

== Geography ==
According to the United States Census Bureau, the city has a total area of 0.20 square miles (0.52 km^{2}), all land.

County Highways 30 and 31 are two of the main routes in the community. Minnesota State Highway 22 is nearby.

== Demographics ==
Historical population
Census	Pop.	Note	%±
1910	103		—
1920	116		12.6%
1930	105		−9.5%
1940	154		46.7%
1950	139		−9.7%
1960	133		−4.3%
1970	152		14.3%
1980	118		−22.4%
1990	86		−27.1%
2000	88		2.3%
2010	73		−17.0%
2020	69		−5.5%
U.S. Decennial Census

=== 2010 census ===
As of the census of 2010, there were 73 people, 31 households, and 20 families living in the city. The population density was 365.0 inhabitants per square mile (140.9/km^{2}). There were 36 housing units at an average density of 180.0 per square mile (69.5/km^{2}). The racial makeup of the city was 98.6% White and 1.4% from other races. Hispanic or Latino of any race were 1.4% of the population.

There were 31 households, of which 22.6% had children under the age of 18 living with them, 54.8% were married couples living together, 3.2% had a female householder with no husband present, 6.5% had a male householder with no wife present, and 35.5% were non-families. 25.8% of all households were made up of individuals, and 12.9% had someone living alone who was 65 years of age or older. The average household size was 2.35 and the average family size was 2.75.

The median age in the city was 43.8 years. 19.2% of residents were under the age of 18; 9.5% were between the ages of 18 and 24; 24.7% were from 25 to 44; 24.7% were from 45 to 64; and 21.9% were 65 years of age or older. The gender makeup of the city was 54.8% male and 45.2% female.

=== 2000 census ===
As of the census of 2000, there were 88 people, 34 households, and 24 families living in the city. The population density was 440.2 inhabitants per square mile (170.0/km^{2}). There were 38 housing units at an average density of 190.1 per square mile (73.4/km^{2}). The racial makeup of the city was 96.59% White, 1.14% Native American, and 2.27% from two or more races. Hispanic or Latino of any race were 6.82% of the population.

There were 34 households, out of which 38.2% had children under the age of 18 living with them, 50.0% were married couples living together, 14.7% had a female householder with no husband present, and 26.5% were non-families. 20.6% of all households were made up of individuals, and 14.7% had someone living alone who was 65 years of age or older. The average household size was 2.59 and the average family size was 2.88.

In the city, the population was spread out, with 33.0% under the age of 18, 3.4% from 18 to 24, 21.6% from 25 to 44, 25.0% from 45 to 64, and 17.0% who were 65 years of age or older. The median age was 36 years. For every 100 females, there were 91.3 males. For every 100 females age 18 and over, there were 78.8 males.

The median income for a household in the city was $28,750, and the median income for a family was $26,563. Males had a median income of $21,250 versus $20,000 for females. The per capita income for the city was $10,472. There were 17.4% of families and 22.9% of the population living below the poverty line, including 50.0% of under eighteens and none of those over 64.
