= Bob Ness =

American politician

Member of the Minnesota House of Representatives from the 20A district
- In office 1993–2002

Personal details
- Born: May 14, 1935 (age 91) Cass County, Minnesota, U.S.
- Party: Republican
- Spouse: Marianne
- Children: 4
- Education: Bemidji State University; University of Minnesota
- Occupation: Educator

Robert Raymond Ness (born May 14, 1935) is an American politician in the state of Minnesota. He served in the Minnesota House of Representatives.
