= Chokio, Minnesota =

City in Minnesota, United States

Chokio
- City
- Location of Chokio, Minnesota
- Coordinates: 45°34′23″N 96°10′27″W
- Country: United States
- State: Minnesota
- County: Stevens

Area
  - Total: 0.44 sq mi (1.13 km^{2})
  - Land: 0.44 sq mi (1.13 km^{2})
  - Water: 0 sq mi (0.00 km^{2})
- Elevation: 1,125 ft (343 m)

Population (2020)
  - Total: 405
  - Density: 925.0/sq mi (357.13/km^{2})
- Time zone: UTC-6 (CST)
  - Summer (DST): UTC-5 (CDT)
- ZIP code: 56221
- Area code: 320
- FIPS code: 27-11440
- GNIS feature ID: 2393519
- Website: https://chokiomn.gov/

Chokio (/ʃəˈkaɪoʊ/ shə-KY-oh) is a city in Stevens County, Minnesota, United States. The population was 404 at the 2020 census.

== History ==
"Chokio" derives from a Lakota word meaning "the middle". It was a midway stop on the Pony Express route between Morris and Graceville. Other accounts say it was the halfway point on the old Wadsworth Trail, which ran between St. Cloud and Sisseton, South Dakota.

== Geography ==
According to the United States Census Bureau, the city has an area of 0.47 square miles (1.22 km^{2}), all land. Minnesota State Highway 28 serves as a main route in the community.

== Demographics ==
Historical population
Census	Pop.	Note	%±
1900	300		—
1910	328		9.3%
1920	420		28.0%
1930	386		−8.1%
1940	492		27.5%
1950	541		10.0%
1960	498		−7.9%
1970	455		−8.6%
1980	559		22.9%
1990	521		−6.8%
2000	443		−15.0%
2010	400		−9.7%
2020	405		1.3%
U.S. Decennial Census; 2020 Census

=== 2010 census ===
As of the census of 2010, there were 400 people, 207 households, and 116 families residing in the city. The population density was 851.1 inhabitants per square mile (328.6/km^{2}). There were 229 housing units at an average density of 487.2 per square mile (188.1/km^{2}). The racial makeup of the city was 99.0% White, 0.3% Asian, 0.5% from other races, and 0.3% from two or more races. Hispanic or Latino of any race were 0.5% of the population.

There were 207 households, of which 15.5% had children under the age of 18 living with them, 49.8% were married couples living together, 2.9% had a female householder with no husband present, 3.4% had a male householder with no wife present, and 44.0% were non-families. 41.1% of all households were made up of individuals, and 22.7% had someone living alone who was 65 years of age or older. The average household size was 1.93 and the average family size was 2.56.

The median age in the city was 55.4 years. 16% of residents were under the age of 18; 3.3% were between the ages of 18 and 24; 18.1% were from 25 to 44; 28.4% were from 45 to 64; and 34.5% were 65 years of age or older. The gender makeup of the city was 46.5% male and 53.5% female.

=== 2000 census ===
As of the census of 2000, there were 443 people, 201 households, and 136 families residing in the city. The population density was 895.8 inhabitants per square mile (345.9/km^{2}). There were 239 housing units at an average density of 483.3 per square mile (186.6/km^{2}). The racial makeup of the city was 99.55% White, and 0.45% from two or more races.

There were 201 households, out of which 24.4% had children under the age of 18 living with them, 57.7% were married couples living together, 7.0% had a female householder with no husband present, and 32.3% were non-families. 28.9% of all households were made up of individuals, and 15.4% had someone living alone who was 65 years of age or older. The average household size was 2.20 and the average family size was 2.69.

In the city, the population was spread out, with 20.5% under the age of 18, 9.5% from 18 to 24, 17.4% from 25 to 44, 24.6% from 45 to 64, and 28.0% who were 65 years of age or older. The median age was 47 years. For every 100 females, there were 84.6 males. For every 100 females age 18 and over, there were 88.2 males.

The median income for a household in the city was $34,107, and the median income for a family was $45,268. Males had a median income of $30,179 versus $18,125 for females. The per capita income for the city was $15,891. About 4.4% of families and 5.2% of the population were below the poverty line, including none of those under age 18 and 12.4% of those age 65 or over.
