= Gene Pelowski =

American politician (born 1952)

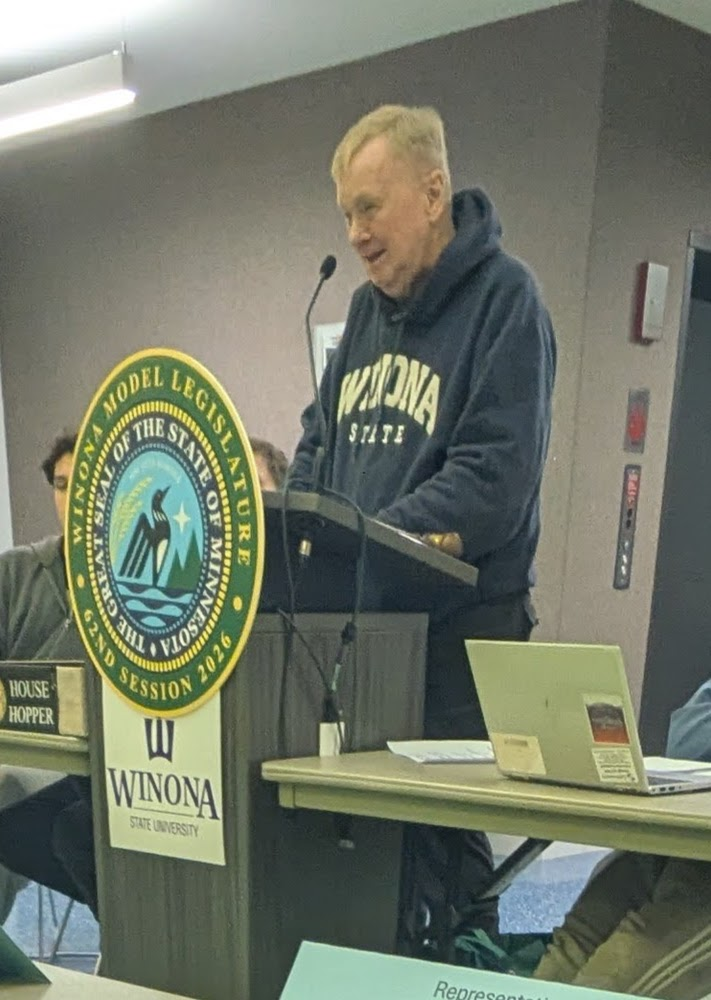
- Pelowski in 2026

Member of the Minnesota House of Representatives
- In office January 6, 1987 – January 14, 2025
- Preceded by: Tim Sherman
- Succeeded by: Aaron Repinski
- Constituency: District 34B (1987–1993); District 32A (1993–2003); District 31A (2003–2013); District 28A (2013–2023); District 26A (2023–2025)

Personal details
- Born: February 1952 (age 74)
- Party: Minnesota Democratic–Farmer–Labor Party
- Spouse: Deborah
- Children: 2
- Education: Winona State University
- Occupation: teacher, golf pro, legislator

Gene P. Pelowski Jr. (born February 2, 1952) is an American politician, teacher, and former member of the Minnesota House of Representatives. A member of the Minnesota Democratic–Farmer–Labor Party (DFL), he represented District 26A, which included the cities of Winona and Goodview and parts of Winona County in southeastern Minnesota.

On January 7, 2024, Pelowski announced he would not seek reelection to the Minnesota House after serving 38 years. At the time of his retirement, he was the longest-serving House member.

== Early life and education ==
Born in 1952, Pelowski attended Red Wing High School. He received a bachelor's degree in social studies and a master's in education from Winona State University. Pelowski taught and coached debate at Winona High School and was a golf professional when he was elected to the legislature.

== Minnesota House of Representatives ==
Pelowski in 1991

Pelowski was first elected in 1986, and has been reelected every two years since, for a total of 19 terms. He represented the old District 34B before the 1992 legislative redistricting, and the old District 32A before the 2002 legislative redistricting. After the 2022 election, he represented the new District 26A. In 2023, he became the longest-serving member of the Minnesota House of Representatives.

During his time in the legislature, Pelowski has served on and chaired numerous committees. In 1997–98, he chaired the Higher Education Committee. Pelowski was an assistant minority leader during the 2003-04 session. After the DFL retook the House in 2006, Pelowski chaired the Governmental Operations, Reform, Technology and Elections Committee until 2011. In 2013–14, he again chaired the Higher Education Committee. After House DFLers regained the majority in 2018, Pelowski chaired both the Subcommittee on Legislative Process Reform and the Industrial Education Jobs and Economic Development Finance Division until the end of the 2021 session. He now again chairs the Higher Education Committee.

In 2013, Pelowski was honored at the Polish Consulate during a visit to the Polish museum in Winona.

Pelowski has been in charge of the Winona Model Legislature, an educational simulation of the Minnesota Legislature, since 1975. He has run the organization's events since before his political career.
