= Tom Workman (Minnesota politician) =

American politician

Carver County Commissioner
- Incumbent
- Assumed office 2003

Member of the Minnesota House of Representatives from the 43A district
- In office 1993–2002

Personal details
- Born: September 29, 1959 (age 67) Minneapolis, Hennepin County, Minnesota
- Party: Republican Party of Minnesota
- Spouse: Carolyn
- Children: 4
- Education: St. Cloud State University
- Occupation: Businessman, insurance agent

Thomas M Workman (born September 29, 1959) is an American politician in the state of Minnesota. He served in the Minnesota House of Representatives.
