= Howard Swenson =

American politician (1930–2024)

Member of the Minnesota House of Representatives from the 23A district
- In office 2003–2004

Member of the Minnesota House of Representatives from the 23B district
- In office 1995–2002

Personal details
- Born: December 20, 1930 Brown County, Minnesota, U.S.
- Died: March 24, 2024 (aged 93) St. Peter, Minnesota, U.S.
- Party: Republican
- Spouse: Jane
- Children: 5
- Occupation: dairy farmer

Maurice Howard Swenson (December 20, 1930 – March 24, 2024) was an American politician in the state of Minnesota. He served in the Minnesota House of Representatives. Swenson died in St. Peter, Minnesota on March 24, 2024, at the age of 93.
