= List of minority leaders of the Minnesota House of Representatives =

Minority Leader of the Minnesota House of Representatives
- Incumbent; Vacant since March 17, 2025
- Term length: Two years, no term limit
- Inaugural holder: Winslow W. Dunn

This is a list of minority leaders of the Minnesota House of Representatives.

Name	Took office	Left office	Party/caucus
Charles L. Halstead	1945	1947	Liberal
Joseph L. Prifrel	1947	1949	Liberal
Edwin J. Chilgren	1949	1951	Liberal
Fred A. Cina	1951	1955	Liberal
John A. Hartle	1955	1957	Conservative
Odin E. S. Langen	1957	1959	Conservative
Lloyd L. Duxbury	1959	1963	Conservative
Fred A. Cina	1963	1969	Liberal
Martin Olav Sabo	1969	1973	Liberal
Aubrey W. Dirlam	1973	1975	Republican
Henry J. Savelkoul	1975	1979	Independent-Republican
None (Note: From 1979 to 1980, the House was evenly divided.)	1979	1980	
Rod Searle	1980	1981	Independent-Republican
Glen Sherwood	1981	1982	Independent-Republican
David M. Jennings	1982	1985	Independent-Republican
Fred Norton	1985	1987	Democratic-Farmer-Labor
William R. Schreiber	1987	1991	Independent-Republican
Terry Dempsey	1991	1993	Independent-Republican
Steve Sviggum	1993	1999	Independent-Republican/Republican
Tom Pugh	1999	2003	Democratic-Farmer-Labor
Matt Entenza	2003	2006	Democratic-Farmer-Labor
Margaret Anderson Kelliher	2006	2007	Democratic-Farmer-Labor
Marty Seifert	2007	2009	Republican
Kurt Zellers	2009	2011	Republican
Paul Thissen	2011	2013	Democratic-Farmer-Labor
Kurt Daudt	2013	2015	Republican
Paul Thissen	2015	2017	Democratic-Farmer-Labor
Melissa Hortman	2017	2019	Democratic-Farmer-Labor
Kurt Daudt	2019	2023	Republican
Lisa Demuth	2023	2025	Republican
Melissa Hortman	2025	2025	Democratic-Farmer-Labor
None (Note: Since March 2025, the House has been evenly divided. Melissa Hortman and later Zack Stephenson held the title of DFL Leader while Lisa Demuth was Speaker of the House)	2025		

== Notes on Minnesota political party names ==
- Minnesota Democratic-Farmer-Labor Party: On April 15, 1944 the state Democratic Party and the Minnesota Farmer-Labor Party merged and created the Minnesota Democratic-Farmer-Labor Party (DFL). It is affiliated with the national Democratic Party.
- Republican Party of Minnesota: From November 15, 1975 to September 23, 1995 the name of the state Republican party was the Independent-Republican party (I-R). The party has always been affiliated with the national Republican Party.

In 1913, Minnesota legislators began to be elected on nonpartisan ballots. Nonpartisanship also was an historical accident that occurred in the 1913 session when a bill to provide for no party elections of judges and city and county officers was amended to include the Legislature in the belief that it would kill the bill. Legislators ran and caucused as "Liberals" or "Conservatives" roughly equivalent in most years to Democratic-Farmer-Labor and Republican, respectively. The law was changed in 1973, in 1974, House members again ran with party designation.
