= Minnesota's 62nd House of Representatives district =

Minnesota's 62nd Legislative district was a district in the Minnesota House of Representatives which existed from 1899 until 1973. At various points it spanned Polk County, Koochiching, Beltrami, and Lake of The Woods Counties, and finally the northern portion of St. Louis County.

== 1897 redistricting ==
=== Polk County (1899–1915) ===
Seat A						Leg.	Seat B						Leg.
Img.	Member	Party	Residence	Term start	Term end	Leg.	Img.	Member	Party	Residence	Term start	Term end	Leg.
District created
	William A. Marin	Pop.	Melvin	January 2, 1899	January 6, 1901	31st		James Cumming	Pop.	Mallory	January 2, 1899	January 4, 1903	31st 32nd
	John E. Oppegaard	Pop.	Erskine	January 7, 1901	January 4, 1903	32nd		Gunder Krostue	Rep.	Fisher	January 5, 1903	January 6, 1907	33rd 34th
	Brayton S. Bennett	Rep.	Fosston	January 5, 1903	January 6, 1907	33rd 34th		Johannes Saugstad	Rep.	Climax	January 7, 1907	January 1, 1911	35th 36th
	John Holten	Rep.	Fertile	January 7, 1907	January 5, 1913	35th 36th 37th		Knute S. Aker	Rep.	Nielsville	January 2, 1911	January 5, 1913	37th
	John Clementson	Rep.	Erskine	January 6, 1913	January 4, 1915	38th		T. T. Morken	Rep.	Crookston	January 6, 1913	January 4, 1915	38th

== 1913 redistricting ==
=== Koochiching County (1915–1963) ===
Img.	Member	Party	Residence	Term start	Term end	Leg.
District created
	Harlan Jerome Miner	NP. Con.	International Falls	January 4, 1915	January 5, 1919	39th 40th
	Francis J. McPartlin	Non.	International Falls	January 6, 1919	December 31, 1922	41st 42nd
	David Hurlburt	Non.	International Falls	January 1, 1923	January 2, 1927	43rd 44th
	Edwin J. Chilgren	NP. Lib.	Littlefork	January 3, 1927	January 6, 1963	45th 46th 47th 48th 49th 50th 51st 52nd 53rd 54th 55th 56th 57th 58th 59th 60th 61st 62nd

=== Beltrami County (1915–1922) ===
Img.	Member	Party	Residence	Term start	Term end	Leg.
District created
	Lloyd G. Pendergast	Non.	Bemidji	January 4, 1915	January 5, 1919	39th 40th
	Adolph Edward Rako	Non.	Bemidji	January 6, 1919	December 31, 1922	41st 42nd

=== Beltrami, Lake of the Woods (1923–1963) ===
Img.	Member	Party	Residence	Counties represented	Term start	Term end	Leg.
District created
	William T. Noonan	Non.	Baudette	Beltrami, Lake of the Woods	January 1, 1923	January 4, 1925	43rd
	Gustaf Erickson	Non.	Spooner	Beltrami, Lake of the Woods	January 5, 1925	January 1, 1939	44th 45th 46th 47th 48th 49th 50th
	Henry E. Vance	Non.	Bemidji	Beltrami, Lake of the Woods	January 2, 1939	January 5, 1941	51st
	Gustaf Erickson	Non.	Spooner	Beltrami, Lake of the Woods	January 6, 1941	Januiary 3,1943	52nd
	Leonard R. Dickinson	NP. Con.	Bemidji	Beltrami, Lake of the Woods	January 4, 1943	December 31, 1950	53rd 54th 55th 56th
	John Henry McKee	NP. Con.	Bemidji	Beltrami, Lake of the Woods	January 1, 1951	January 2, 1955	57th 58th
	Elmer E. Berglund	NP. Lib.	Bemidji	Beltrami, Lake of the Woods	January 3, 1955	January 1, 1961	59th 60th 61st
	Leonard R. Dickinson	NP. Con.	Bemidji	Beltrami, Lake of the Woods	January 2, 1961	January 6, 1963	62nd

== 1959 redistricting ==
=== St. Louis County (1963–1972) ===
Seat A						Leg.	Seat B						Leg.
Img.	Member	Party	Residence	Term start	Term end	Leg.	Img.	Member	Party	Residence	Term start	Term end	Leg.
District created
	Peter X. Fugina	NP. Lib.	Virginia	January 7, 1963	January 1, 1967	63rd 64th		Frederick A. Cina	NP. Lib.	Aurora	January 7, 1963	January 5, 1969	63rd 64th 65th
	J. William Trygg	NP. Con.	Ely	January 2, 1967	January 5, 1969	65th		Roy R. Coombe	NP. Lib.	Biwabik	January 6, 1969	January 3, 1971	66th
	Edwin H. Hoff	NP. Lib.	Virginia	January 6, 1969	January 3, 1971	66th		William R. Ojala	NP. Lib.	Aurora	January 4, 1971	December 31, 1972	67th
	Peter X. Fugina	NP. Lib.	Virginia	January 4, 1971	December 31, 1972	67th		William R. Ojala	NP. Lib.	Aurora	January 4, 1971	December 31, 1972	67th
District dissolved
