= 67th Minnesota Legislature =

1971 legislative session

Sixty-seventh Minnesota Legislature
←	66th Minnesota Legislature	68th Minnesota Legislature	→
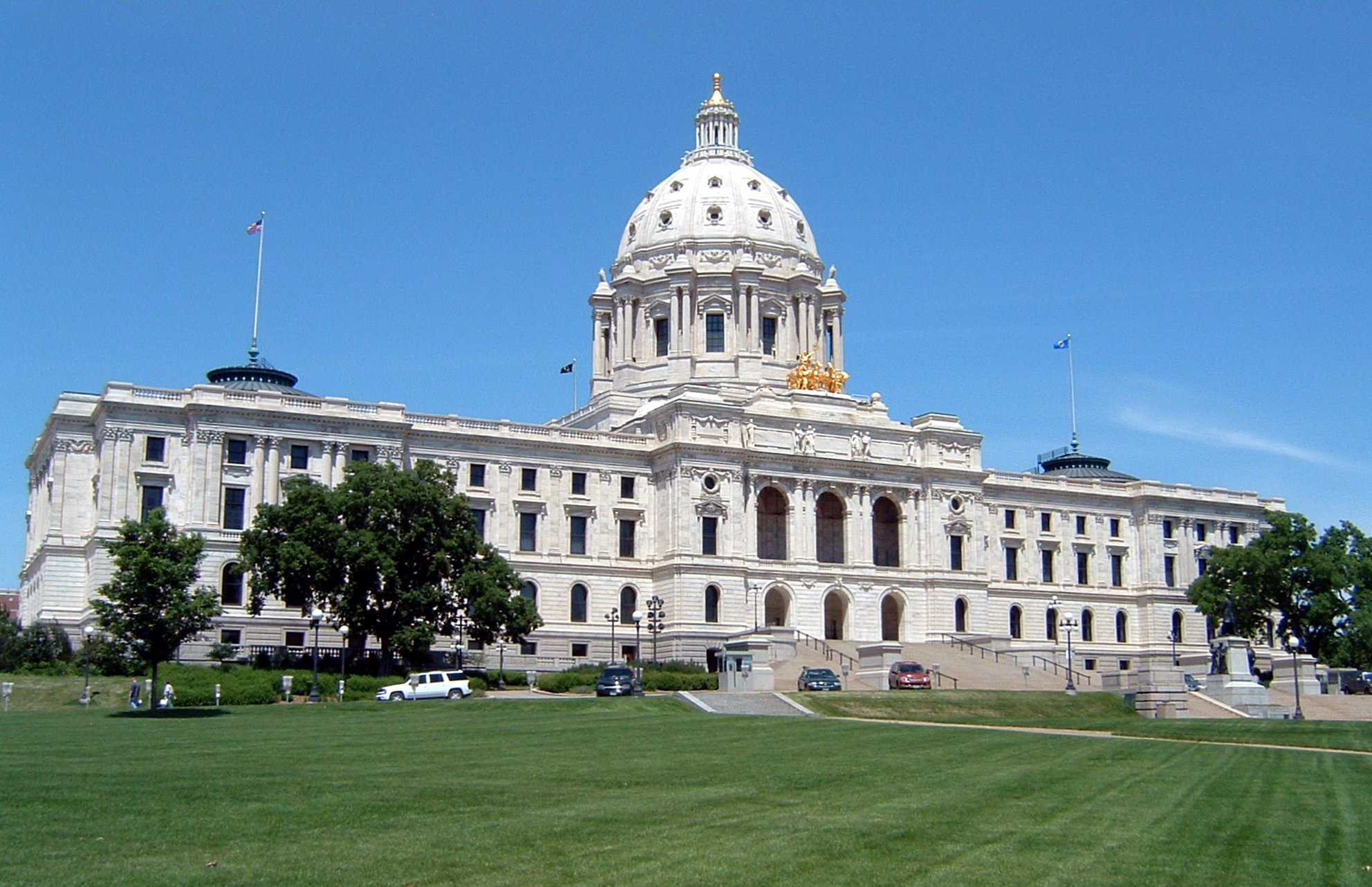

Overview
- Legislative body: Minnesota Legislature
- Jurisdiction: Minnesota, United States
- Meeting place: Minnesota State Capitol
- Website: www.leg.state.mn.us

Minnesota State Senate
- Members: 67 Senators
- President: Rudy Perpich
- Majority Leader: Stanley W. Holmquist
- Minority Leader: Nick Coleman
- Party control: Republican Party of Minnesota

Minnesota House of Representatives
- Members: 134 Representatives
- Speaker: Aubrey W. Dirlam
- Majority Leader: Ernest A. Lindstrom
- Minority Leader: Martin Olav Sabo
- Party control: Republican Party of Minnesota

Sessions
- 1971: January 5, 1971 – May 24, 1971

Special sessions
- 1971, 1st: May 25, 1971 – October 30, 1971

The sixty-seventh Minnesota Legislature first convened on January 5, 1971. The 67 members of the Minnesota Senate and the 134 members of the Minnesota House of Representatives were elected during the general election of November 3, 1970. The session is considered notable for the passage of the "Minnesota Miracle", a legislative package aimed at lowering local property taxes and eliminating wide fiscal disparities between school districts and local governments caused by differences in property wealth. This was achieved by raising state income, business, and sales taxes by $580 million (not inflation adjusted), while the share of school operating costs covered by the state increased from 43% to 65%. The laws earned Minnesota's Governor a spot on the cover of Time Magazine, while also serving as the start to a broader period of statewide reform and DFL dominance of state politics in the 1970s.

== Sessions ==
The legislature met in a regular session from January 5, 1971, to May 24, 1971. After the DFL Governor and Republican legislature failed to reach an agreement on a tax bill, a special session was called. It was held from May 25 to October 30 of 1971 and is still the longest in Minnesota history.

== Major legislation ==
- July 23, 1971: Fiscal Disparities Act (Laws 1971, Special Session chapter 24)
- August 3, 1971: Constitutional amendment allowing for flexible legislative sessions (Laws 1971, Special Session chapter 26)
- October 30, 1971: "Minnesota Miracle" – Omnibus Tax and Education Act (Laws 1971, Special Session chapter 31)

== Party summary ==
Resignations and new members are discussed in the "Membership changes" section, below.

=== Senate ===
	Party (Shading indicates majority caucus)		Total	Vacant
	R	DFL	Total	Vacant
End of previous Legislature	45	22	67	0
Begin	34	33	67	0
Latest voting share	51%	49%	67	0
Beginning of the next Legislature	30	37	67	0

=== House of Representatives ===
	Party (Shading indicates majority caucus)		Total	Vacant
	R	DFL	Total	Vacant
End of previous Legislature	85	50	134	0
Begin	70	65	134	0
Latest voting share	52%	49%	134	0
Beginning of the next Legislature	57	77	134	0

== Leadership ==
=== Senate ===
- President: Rudy Perpich (DFL)
- Majority Leader: Stanley W. Holmquist (R–Grove City)
- Minority Leader: Nicholas D. Coleman (DFL–Saint Paul)

=== House of Representatives ===
- Speaker of the House: Aubrey W. Dirlam (R–Redwood Falls)
- Majority Leader: Ernest A. Lindstrom (R–Richfield)
- Minority Leader: Martin Olav Sabo (DFL–Minneapolis)

== See also ==
- 1970 Minneapolis teachers' strike, an illegal strike by public employees that preceded the reform laws
