= Paul Overgaard =

American politician (1930–2022)

Member of the Minnesota Senate from the 9th district
- In office January 5, 1971 – January 1, 1973
- Preceded by: Rudolph Hanson
- Succeeded by: Charles Robert Hansen "Baldy, C.R."

Member of the Minnesota House of Representatives from the 9A district 9 (1963-1966)
- In office January 8, 1963 – January 6, 1969
- Preceded by: Edmond Conn
- Succeeded by: Henry J. Savelkoul

Personal details
- Born: February 15, 1930 Albert Lea, Minnesota, U.S.
- Died: February 4, 2022 (aged 91)
- Party: Republican Party of Minnesota
- Spouse: Janet
- Children: 5
- Occupation: Legislator
- Awards: Silver Star; Purple Heart

Military service
- Allegiance: United States of America
- Branch/service: United States Army
- Years of service: 1948–1953
- Rank: First Lieutenant
- Battles/wars: Korean War

Paul Philip Overgaard (February 15, 1930 – February 4, 2022) was an American politician in the state of Minnesota who was a member of the Minnesota Senate and the Minnesota House of Representatives. A member of the Republican Party of Minnesota, he represented District 9 (present-day district 27) in the Senate and 9A (present-day 27A) in the House, which includes portions of Freeborn and Waseca counties in southeastern Minnesota.

== Education, military, and career ==
Born in Albert Lea, Minnesota, Overgaard graduated from Albert Lea High School. He served in the military from 1948 to 1953 and fought in the Korean War. Overgaard spent the morning of his 21st birthday on February 15, 1951, in a firefight where he parachuted twice, led a company of soldiers in battle after his commander and fellow platoon leaders fell, and sustained a gunshot wound in his thigh forceful enough to send shrapnel into his ankle and heel. He helped win the battle that erupted at 3 a.m. on his birthday in part by calling off friendly fire that would have produced a tragic result had it continued unchecked. Overgaard was awarded a Silver Star, a Purple Heart, and an article and photo in the Minneapolis Star on June 11, 1951, announcing his return to Albert Lea, then stateside service in Ft. Bragg, North Carolina. After his return from Korea, he was a grain farmer and worked for Mutual Funds Securities as an investment adviser and as vice president of Imperial Financial Services, Inc. Overgaard died on February 4, 2022, at the age of 91.

== Minnesota House of Representatives ==
=== Elections ===
Overgaard was first elected in 1962. He was reelected in 1964 and 1966. He decided not to seek reelection in 1968.

1966 Minnesota State Representative- House 9A
Party	Candidate	Votes	%	±%
Democratic (DFL)	Bernard W. Jackson	4268	45.6	
Republican	Paul Overgaard (incumbent)	5097	54.4	

1964 Minnesota State Representative- House 9
Party	Candidate	Votes	%	±%
Democratic (DFL)	Edmond F. Conn	7517	47.60	
Republican	Paul Overgaard (incumbent)	8263	52.40	

1962 Minnesota State Representative- House 9
Party	Candidate	Votes	%	±%
Democratic (DFL)	Edmond F. Conn (incumbent)	6579	48.6	
Republican	Paul Overgaard	6962	51.4	

=== Committee assignments ===
For the 65th legislative session, Overgaard was a part of:

- Civil Administration Committee
- Employees Compensation Committee
- Highways Committee
- Recreation and Water Resources Committee
- Taxes Committee
- University and College Committee

For the 64th legislative session, Overgaard was a part of:

- Employees Compensation Committee
- General Legislation and Veterans Affairs Committee
- Highways Committee
- Municipal Affairs Committee
- Taxes Committee

For the 63rd legislative session, Overgaard was a part of:

- Cooperatives and Marketing Committee
- Employees Compensation Committee
- Industrial and Employee Relations Committee
- Metropolitan and Urban Affairs Committee
- Municipal Affairs Committee
- Recreation and Water Resources Committee

=== Tenure ===
Overgaard represented District 31A in the Minnesota House of Representatives from January 8, 1963 to January 6, 1969 (63rd, 64th, and 65th legislative sessions).

== Minnesota Senate ==
=== Elections ===
Overgaard was first elected to the Minnesota Senate in 1970. He lost reelection in 1972.

1972 Minnesota State Senator- Senate 9
Party	Candidate	Votes	%	±%
Democratic (DFL)	C. R. Baldy Hansen	13085	53.38	
Republican	Paul Overgaard (incumbent)	11426	46.62	

1970 Minnesota State Senator- Senate 9
Party	Candidate	Votes	%	±%
Democratic (DFL)	Elroy (Al) Schulz	9629	49.80	
Republican	Paul Overgaard	9718	50.20	

=== Committee assignments ===
For the 67th legislative session, Overgaard was a part of:

- Civil Administration Committee
- Commerce and Insurance Committee
- Education Committee
- Labor Relations Committee
- Local Government Committee
- Regulated Industries Committee

=== Tenure ===
Overgaard was sworn in on January 5, 1971, serving in the 67th Minnesota legislature.

== Personal life ==
Overgaard was married to his wife, Janet. They had five daughters and lived in Albert Lea, Minnesota.

Minnesota Senate
Preceded by Rudolph Hanson	Senator from the 9th district 1971–1973	Succeeded by Charles Robert Hansen "Baldy, C.R."
Minnesota House of Representatives
Preceded by Edmond Conn	Member of the House of Representatives from the 9A district 9 (1963–1967); 1963-1968	Succeeded by Henry J. Savelkoul
