= Aubrey W. Dirlam =

American politician

A.W. Dirlam
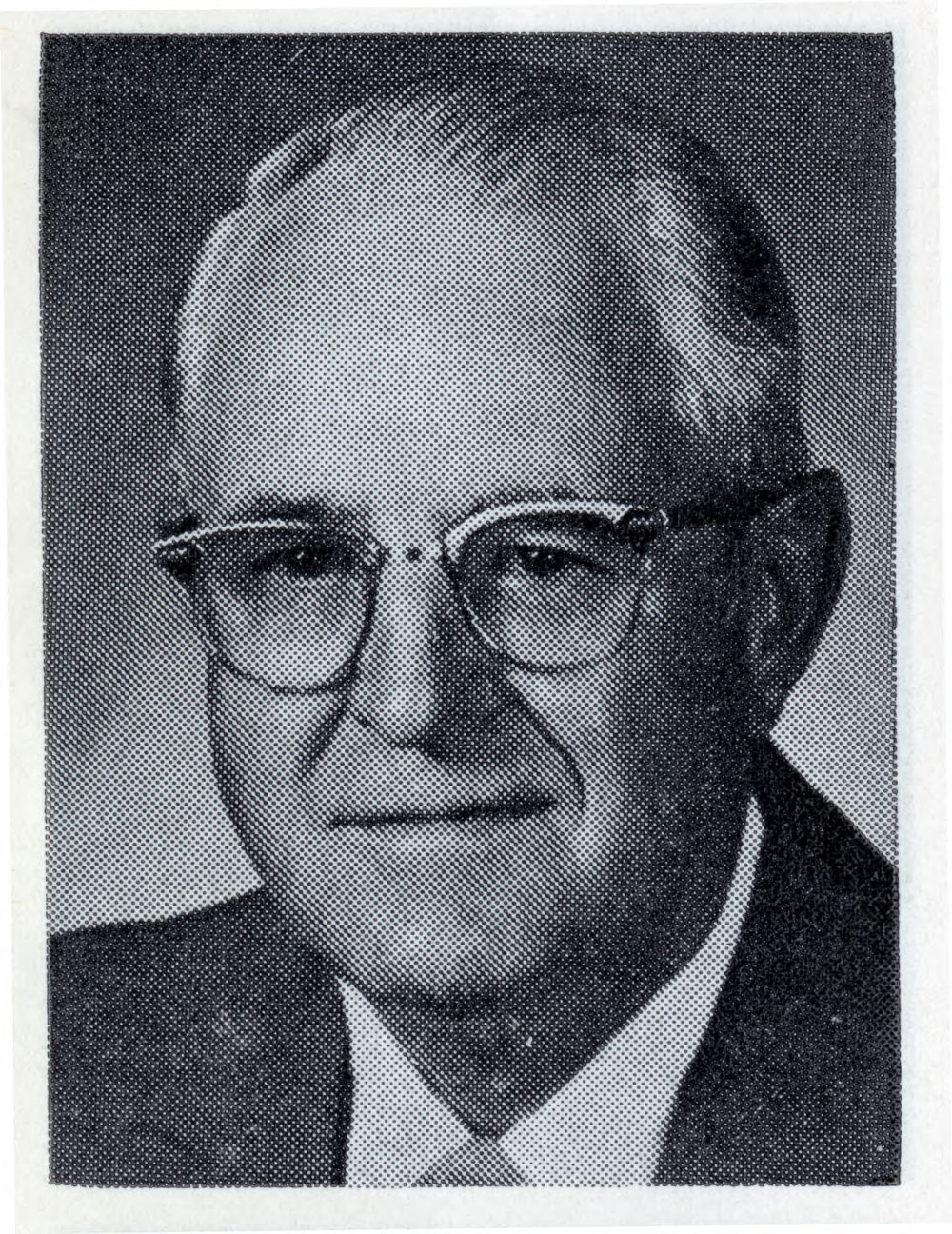
- Dirlam in 1973

45th Speaker of the Minnesota House of Representatives
- In office January 5, 1971 – December 31, 1972
- Preceded by: Lloyd L. Duxbury
- Succeeded by: Martin Olav Sabo

Minnesota House Majority Leader
- In office January 8, 1963 – January 3, 1971
- Preceded by: Frederick A. Cina
- Succeeded by: Ernest A. Lindstrom

Minnesota House Minority Leader
- In office January 2, 1973 – January 5, 1975
- Preceded by: Martin Olav Sabo
- Succeeded by: Henry J. Savelkoul
- In office January 8, 1957 – January 4, 1959
- Preceded by: John A. Hartle
- Succeeded by: Lloyd L. Duxbury

Member of the Minnesota House of Representatives
- In office January 2, 1967 – January 5, 1975
- Preceded by: District established
- Succeeded by: Alvin Setzepfandt
- Constituency: District 17A (1971–1972); District 21B (1973–1975)
- In office January 6, 1941 – January 1, 1967
- Preceded by: Harvey Edwin Swennes
- Succeeded by: District abolished
- Constituency: 14th district (1941–1963); 17th district (1963–1971)

Personal details
- Born: October 20, 1913 Panora, Iowa, U.S.
- Died: June 3, 1995 (aged 81) Redwood Falls, Minnesota, U.S.
- Party: Republican
- Spouse: Married
- Children: 2
- Profession: farmer, legislator

Aubrey W. Dirlam (October 20, 1913 – June 3, 1995) was a Minnesota politician and a former member of the Minnesota House of Representatives who represented the old District 14, District 17, District 17A, and District 21B, which included all or portions of Brown, Kandiyohi, Redwood, Renville and Yellow Medicine counties in the southwestern part of the state. The district number and boundaries changed through the years due to redistricting.

== House service and leadership ==
First elected in 1940, Dirlam was re-elected every two years until he retired in 1975. During his 34 years in the House, he served as Speaker, Majority Leader and Minority Leader. He was a member of the Legislature at a time when candidates, representatives and leadership positions were officially non-partisan. He allied with the House's Conservative Caucus, and was known to be a Republican.

Dirlam originally sought the House speakership in 1963, but lost the contest by one vote to Lloyd Duxbury, accepting the majority leader position in compensation. He later succeeded Duxbury as Speaker in 1971 and was the last officially nonpartisan Speaker. He had occasion to preside over the longest special session in state history (159 calendar days) that same year after Governor Wendell Anderson called the Legislature back to Saint Paul. After a series of meetings with the governor and Senate Majority Leader Stanley Holmquist, they were able to craft the "Minnesota Miracle," which set a new pattern in the state's financing of education.

Dirlam served as chair of the Agriculture Committee from 1949 to 1955, and as chair of the Rules Committee from 1963 to 1971. He was also a member of the Education, Governmental Operations, Rules and Legislative Administration, and Taxes committees.

== Background and later years ==
Born in Panora, Iowa, Dirlam moved with his family to the Redwood Falls, Minnesota area in 1919, where they farmed. In addition to being a lifelong grain and livestock farmer, he and his family were also involved with a meat and locker business. He also served on the Redwood Falls School Board.

In 1981, Governor Al Quie appointed Dirlam to serve on the Minnesota Board of Residential Utility Consumers, a position he held until 1985. He died in 1995 and was buried in Redwood Falls Cemetery.

Political offices
Preceded by Lloyd L. Duxbury	Speaker of the Minnesota House of Representatives; 1971–1973	Succeeded by Martin Olav Sabo
Preceded by Frederick A. Cina	Minnesota House Majority Leader; 1963-1971	Succeeded by Ernest A. Lindstrom
