= Lloyd L. Duxbury =

American politician

Lloyd L. Duxbury, Jr.
- Representative Lloyd L. Duxbury

44th Speaker of the Minnesota House of Representatives
- In office January 8, 1963 – January 3, 1971
- Preceded by: Edwin J. Chilgren
- Succeeded by: Aubrey W. Dirlam

Minnesota House Minority Leader
- In office January 6, 1959 – January 6, 1963
- Preceded by: Odin E. S. Langen
- Succeeded by: Frederick A. Cina

Member of the Minnesota House of Representatives
- In office January 2, 1967 – January 3, 1971
- Preceded by: District established
- Succeeded by: Leonard C. Myrah
- Constituency: District 1B
- In office January 1, 1951 – January 1, 1967
- Preceded by: Carl S. Burtness
- Succeeded by: District abolished
- Constituency: 1st district

Personal details
- Born: February 1, 1922 Caledonia, Minnesota, U.S.
- Died: March 23, 2002 (aged 80) Saint Paul, Minnesota, U.S.
- Party: Republican
- Spouse: Rosemary
- Children: 2
- Education: Phillips Exeter Academy; Harvard College; Harvard University Law School
- Profession: attorney, legislator

Lloyd L. Duxbury, Jr. (February 1, 1922 – March 23, 2002) was a Minnesota politician and member of the Minnesota House of Representatives representing the old Districts 1 and 1B, which included all or portions of Houston and Winona counties in the southeastern part of the state. He was also House Speaker from 1963–1971 and Minority Leader from 1959–1963.

Duxbury was first elected to the House in 1950 at a time when candidates, representatives and leadership positions were officially non-partisan. He allied with the House's Conservative Caucus, and was known to be a Republican. He was re-elected nine times. When the Conservative Caucus gained a majority in 1963, he became Speaker by one vote over Aubrey Dirlam, and held the position until his retirement from the House in 1971, when he was succeeded by Dirlam.

Duxbury was offered the position of United States Attorney for Minnesota by President Richard Nixon in 1969, but declined. After leaving the Legislature, he became a lobbyist for and vice president of Burlington Northern Railroad.

Duxbury died in 2002.

Political offices
Preceded by Edwin J. Chilgren	Speaker of the Minnesota House of Representatives; 1963–1971	Succeeded by A.W. Dirlam
