= 2024 Minnesota House of Representatives district 27B special election =

- March 19, 2024

Minnesota House of Representatives District 27B
Candidate	Bryan Lawrence	Brad Brown
Party	Republican	Democratic (DFL)
Popular vote	1,752	319
Percentage	84.52%	15.39%
- Results by precinct No votes Lawrence: 70–80% 80–90% >90%
Representative before election
Kurt Daudt
Republican
Elected Representative
Bryan Lawrence
Republican

A special election was held in the U.S. state of Minnesota on March 19, 2024, to elect a new representative for district 27B in the state's House of Representatives. The special election was caused by the resignation of Republican incumbent Kurt Daudt. The candidates in the general election were Bryan Lawrence and Brad Brown for the Republican and Democratic–Farmer–Labor parties, respectively. Lawrence defeated his primary opponent Rachel Davis by over 81 points, and Brown won his primary uncontested. In the general election, Lawrence won in a landslide with over 84.5% of the total vote.

== Background ==
District 27B is located north of the Minneapolis–Saint Paul area and covers parts of the Anoka, Isanti, Mille Lacs, and Sherburne counties. On January 10, 2024, Kurt Daudt, the Republican representative for District 27B, announced his resignation from the Minnesota House of Representatives, effective February 11. He did not immediately provide a reason for his resignation. Two days after his resignation became effective, governor Tim Walz selected March 19 as the date of the special election to replace Daudt and February 29 as the date of the special primaries, if they were to be held.

== Primaries ==
=== Republican Party ===
Republican primary results by precinct No votes Lawrence: 60–70% 70–80% 80–90% >90%

On February 8, 2024, farmer and businessman Bryan Lawrence announced his campaign for the District 27B seat, claiming that the "trifecta" of Minnesota Democratic–Farmer–Labor Party control in the state government "has led to a trifecta of assaults on our central Minnesota way of life". Lawrence previously served on the Baldwin Township board, including as its chair, and had run for the House before in 1996. Mechanical adjuster and former caregiver Rachel Davis was also a candidate for the Republican primary, campaigning on a smaller government that follows the Constitution of the United States. She had previously ran against Daudt in a primary challenge in 2022. On February 10, Lawrence received the endorsement of the Minnesota Republican Party. Davis was not present at the endorsement convention after a screening committee for the Republicans revealed that, since 2022, she was on probation for driving under the influence. Davis decided to continue her campaign after failing to receive the endorsement from the Minnesota Republican Party. In the primary election, Lawrence defeated Davis in a landslide, receiving nearly 91% of the vote.

2024 Minnesota House of Representatives district 27B special Republican primary
Candidate	Votes	%
Bryan Lawrence	1,277	90.95%
Rachel Davis	127	9.05%
Total votes	1,404	100.00%

=== Democratic–Farmer–Labor Party ===
Brad Brown, a small business owner and retired diesel mechanic, was the only candidate in the Democratic primary and won unopposed. He had previously challenged Daudt in the 2018, 2020, and 2022 elections.

2024 Minnesota House of Representatives district 27B special Democratic primary
Candidate	Votes	%
Brad Brown	98	100.00%
Total votes	98	100.00%

== General election ==
Throughout the election, Lawrence campaigned on anti-abortion policies, controlling Minnesota's budget, and protecting gun ownership. In a landslide victory, Lawrence won with over 84% of the total vote. Brown congratulated Lawrence, stating that he hoped Lawrence "has continuity and does a good job in the House". Lawrence was sworn in on April 2, 2024, and the DFL retained their majority in the House, having 70 seats compared to the 64 seats controlled by the Republicans. He was elected to a full term in the House in the regular 2024 election.

2024 Minnesota House of Representatives district 27B special election
Party	Candidate	Votes	%
Republican	Bryan Lawrence	1,752	84.52%
Democratic (DFL)	Brad Brown	319	15.39%
Write-in		2	0.10%
Total votes		2,073	100.00%

== See also ==
- List of special elections to the Minnesota House of Representatives
