= 1970 Minneapolis teachers' strike =

Labor action in Minnesota, United States

- Date: April 9–29, 1970 (2 weeks and 6 days)
- Location: Minneapolis, Minnesota, United States
- Caused by: Disagreements over the terms of a new labor contract
- Goals: Increased pay, class-size reduction, and additional employee benefits
- Result: Both sides agree to a compromise that ended the strike. Later, state government passes laws allowing for public sector strikes and increasing school funding.

Parties
Minneapolis Federation of Teachers Local 59	Minneapolis Public Schools

Units involved
1,800 teachers	

In April 1970, roughly 1,800 teachers in Minneapolis, Minnesota, United States, represented by the Minneapolis Federation of Teachers Local 59, went on strike after negotiations with Minneapolis Public Schools over a new labor contract had reached an impasse. The strike lasted from April 9 to April 29, before a compromise was reached between the two parties.

In 1946, teachers in nearby Saint Paul had gone on strike over large class sizes and low pay, among other issues, and while their strike succeeded in addressing their issues, the state passed a law a few years later barring public employees from engaging in strike actions. However, by the late 1960s, teachers in Minneapolis were beginning to face the same issues that their compatriots in Saint Paul had, particularly regarding pay. However, the school district refused to meet their demands for increased salaries, stating that they did not have the financial ability to do so. As a result, on April 9, about half of the teachers in Minneapolis began picketing outside of their schools. On April 13, the district closed their schools indefinitely due to the teacher shortage. However, by April 29, the two sides agreed to end the strike, with the union agreeing to a compromise on pay and the district agreeing to not penalize formerly striking teachers.

The following year, the state government passed laws addressing some of the issues raised by the strikers. A law was passed that allowed for public employees to legally strike, while legislation that increased school funding was also signed into law. The labor dispute would remain the last teachers' strike in the city until 2022. During news coverage of that event, it was discovered that an 11-year-old Prince had participated in protests in favor of the teachers.

== Background ==
=== Organized labor among Minnesota teachers ===
The history of organized labor among teachers in the U.S. state of Minnesota dates back to 1861, when the Minnesota Education Association, the state's first labor union for educators, was established in Rochester. In 1946, roughly 1,100 public school teachers in the state's capital, Saint Paul, went on strike in what is generally considered the first organized teachers' strike in the country. (Note: A 2018 article in the Minnesota Star Tribune states that, while some historians consider the 1946 strike in Saint Paul to be the first organized strike of teachers in United States history, others consider a 1902 protest in Chicago to be the first.) The teachers demanded class-size reduction, higher pay, improvements to school facilities, and increased funding for textbooks. The labor dispute attracted national attention and ultimately ended in victory for the striking teachers. In 1951, the state government made such actions illegal with the enactment of a law barring public employees in the state from striking. Public employees who engaged in striking could face dismissal and the loss of employee benefits, including pensions. The law remained in effect through 1970.

=== Issues in Minneapolis ===
By the late 1960s, public school teachers in Minneapolis were facing many of the same issues that their counterparts in Saint Paul had experienced several decades earlier. This included large class sizes and a lack of access to classroom supplies, with many teachers having to pay out of pocket or petition the families of students for supplies. At the time, the teachers were represented by two unions: the Minneapolis Education Association and the Minneapolis Federation of Teachers Local 59. Of the 3,400 teachers in the city's 99 public schools, about 1,800 were represented by Local 59. Throughout the 1969–1970 academic year, the bargaining units for both unions had been in negotiations with Minneapolis Public Schools, with the teachers operating under the previous year's contract in the meantime. However, by early 1970, the two sides were at an impasse. At the time, public school teachers in the city were earning an average annual salary of between $6,950 to $13,535 (equivalent to between $57,619 and $112,212 in 2025). Negotiators for Local 59 were demanding an increase to between $8,000 and $16,100 ($66,324 and $133,477 in 2025). However, the school district that they did not have the financial resources to satisfy their demands, countering with new pay increases to between $7,500 and $15,000 ($62,179 and $124,357 in 2025). In addition to the pay increases, the unions were also seeking reduced class sizes and additional benefits. As a result, on April 6, Local 59 voted to strike against the school district. The other union did not vote to strike, but expressed their support for Local 59. In response, the school district sought and was granted a restraining order against Local 59.

== Course of the strike ==
Beginning at around 7 a.m. on April 9, striking teachers began picketing outside of the schools, in violation of both the 1951 no-strike law and the school district's restraining order. Over the course of their strike, the teachers maintained strong support from the local community, and in many cases, students and their family members also took part in picketing. On April 13, due to the strike, the school district indefinitely suspended operations at all schools. While negotiations were ongoing between Local 59 and the school district at this point, they broke down within the next few days. On April 27, more than two weeks into the strike, negotiators for the schools and the union reached a tentative agreement on the terms of a new labor contract, which was to be put to a vote by its members the following day. The exact details of the contract were not immediately made public. On April 29, the strike came to a close.

== Aftermath ==
The union had agreed to a compromise with the school district on the subject of pay. In lieu of a wage increase, teachers would receive a one-time payment of $1,000 ($8,290 in 2025). Additionally, the striking teachers received pay for seven days while they had been on strike. Regarding the law violation, the district agreed to not penalize any teacher who had engaged in strike activities.

=== Later developments ===
In December 1970, the Minnesota Supreme Court, in reviewing the anti-strike law, deemed the agreement that had been met between the district and union to be invalid, canceling the $1,000 payments and requiring the district to recover the pay that the teachers had accumulated during the strike. The following year, as a direct result of the strike, the 67th Minnesota Legislature passed the Public Employee Labor Relations Act, which allowed, under certain conditions, for public employees to participate legally in strike actions. Additionally, the government passed a series of laws that affected the state of education in Minnesota. The laws, referred to as the "Minnesota Miracle", increased funding for public schools and addressed funding discrepancies between schools in high-income and low-income areas.

=== Later strike action and legacy ===
The strike was the subject of a historical nonfiction book published in 2022. That same year, teachers in Minneapolis went on strike for the first time since 1970. During news coverage for this strike, WCCO-TV, the CBS affiliate in Minneapolis, aired archival footage of the 1970 strike. While reviewing old footage, it was revealed that the station had interviewed an 11-year-old student who was protesting alongside teachers. In an interview, the boy said that he supported the picketing and believed that the teachers should be paid more. The identity of this individual was later confirmed to be Prince, the musician who grew up in Minneapolis and attended one of the public schools being picketed. The story attracted national attention.

== See also ==
- Teacher strikes in the United States
