= Burtness =

Burtness is a surname. Notable people with the surname include:

- Barbara Burtness, American internist and oncologist
- Carl S. Burtness (1882–1954), American farmer, businessman, politician
- Harold W. Burtness (1897–1978), American railroad executive
- Olger B. Burtness (1884–1960), American politician and judge
