= Lawrence Hall =

Lawrence Hall or Lawrance Hall may refer to:

== People ==
- Lawrence John Hall, theoretical particle physicist
- Larry Hall (singer) (Lawrence Kendall Hall, 1940–1997), American singer
- Lawrence M. Hall (1908–1973), Minnesota Democratic politician
- Lawrence Sargent Hall (1915–1993), American author
- Lawrence W. Hall (1819–1863), U.S. representative from Ohio
- Laurie Hall (Lawrence Marshall Hall, born c. 1938), Welsh hammer thrower
- Lawrence Hall (Oregon politician), member of the Oregon Territorial Legislature, 1851

== Places ==
- Lawrence Hall of Science, a public science center above the University of California, Berkeley
- Lawrence Hall, London, a Grade II listed building
- Lawrence Hall, Oxford, a historic hall
- David Lawrence Hall, an academic building at the University of Pittsburgh in Pittsburgh, Pennsylvania
- Lawrence Hall, a building at Point Park University in Pittsburgh, Pennsylvania
- Lawrence Hall, a hall at the University of Oregon, home to its College of Design
- Lawrance Hall, a hall on the Old Campus of Yale University

== See also ==
- St. Lawrence Hall, a meeting hall in Toronto, Canada
- Laurence Hall (born 1984), English footballer
- Lawrence Hill (disambiguation)
- Larry Hall (disambiguation)
