= Teachers' strikes =

== In the United States ==
From 1968 to 2012 at least 839 teacher strikes have occurred in the US. 740 of these have been in Pennsylvania. Teacher strikes and walkouts have since increased in popularity outside of Pennsylvania due to the Red for Ed movement in 2018-19.

=== History ===
The 1919 Boston police strike chilled union interest in the public sector in the 1920s. The major exception was the emergence of unions of public school teachers in the largest cities; they formed the American Federation of Teachers (AFT), affiliated with the AFL. In suburbs and small cities, the National Education Association (NEA) became active, but it insisted it was not a labor union but a professional organization.

=== Legality ===
The legality of teacher strikes vary from state to state. Collective bargaining by public sector employees and therefore teachers is explicitly illegal in Georgia, North Carolina, South Carolina, Texas, and Virginia. 12 states have explicitly stated that teacher strikes are legal. These states are Alaska, California, Colorado, Hawaii, Illinois, Louisiana, Minnesota, Montana, Ohio, Oregon, Pennsylvania, and Vermont. South Carolina, Utah, and Wyoming have no explicit statutes or case law on the subject.

In states that explicitly ban strikes, teachers have employed alternative tactics, such as walkouts and sick-outs where the majority of teachers call in sick on the same day.

=== 2018-2019 Education Workers' Strike Movement (Red for Ed) ===
In February 2018, the US saw an education protest and strike movement, which began in West Virginia. Statewide, Oklahoma, Colorado, and Arizona followed suit. Demands varied from state to state but included funding sources for education, pension issues, increased pay.

=== Strikes by State ===
==== Colorado ====
Despite being explicitly allowed, Colorado had no teacher's strikes between 1994 and 2018. Pueblo Education Association went on strike May 2, 2018 asking for a 2% raise and $30 per a month for health insurance. The Denver Classroom Teachers Association, the largest teachers union in the state, went on strike in February 2019 over low pay, and issues around an unpredictable and unjust compensation model. Sheridan Education Association went on strike April 1, 2026 after working without a contract since August 2025. The union also sought to recognize classified staff as part of their bargaining unit.

List of Modern Colorado Teacher Strikes
Date	District	Length of Strike	Median Teacher Salary Year of Strike	Spending per Student	Number of Teachers in District Year of Strike	Primary Point of Contention
1994	Denver Public Schools	5 days			~3,700 (2,200 on strike)	Classroom size
2018, May 2	Pueblo City Schools	5 days	$47,617			Cost of Living Raise
2018, April	Statewide (10 districts)	1 day walk-out rally	$52,728			Cost of Living Raise and adjustments to state retirement program (PERA)
2019, February 11	Denver Public Schools	3 days				Cost of Living Raise, Ending unpredictable compensation model tied to test scores and evaluations.
2019, October	Park County School District RE-2	8 days			40	Cost of Living Raise and Collective Bargaining Agreement
2026, April 1	Sheridan School District 2	18 days				Reinstate Licensed Contract. Recognize classified employees as part of bargaining unit. Retract disciplinary actions against staff.

==== Illinois ====
A strike of Chicago Public School teachers that occurred in 2019 was significant enough to garner support from national politicians.

Illinois holds the record for the longest teachers' strike to date. This was an eight month strike beginning in October 1986 in Homer, IL. After roughly one month, the school board hired strike breaking substitutes for much of the school year.

==== Minnesota ====
Strikes involving public school teachers have occurred in Saint Paul in 1946 and Minneapolis in 1970.

==== New Jersey ====
Long Branch teachers and staff struck from October 22, 1974, until November 3, 1974.

==== Ohio ====
Ohio holds the record for the second longest teachers' strike, which lasted for 85 days in 1981.

==== Oregon ====
The 2023 Portland Association of Teachers strike was the first teacher strike in district history. The strike involved teachers and other PAT members at Portland Public Schools, the largest school district in Oregon. The strike began on November 1, 2023 and ended November 26, 2023.

The 2024 Greater Albany Education Association (GAEA) teacher strike began on November 12, 2024 in Greater Albany Public Schools in Albany, Oregon. The strike ended on December 2, 2024. This strike follows a tumultuous several years in the school district beginning with the election of several new school board members in 2021 and the subsequent firing without cause of the Superintendent at that time, Melissa Goff, in the middle of her contract period. Goff was eventually replaced with Superintendent Andy Gardner, whose salary has been set at a higher rate than any other Superintendent at similarly sized school district in Oregon, despite the district having some of the largest class sizes and lowest teacher salaries of any similarly sized districts in the state. Tensions have persisted in the district the past several years, culminating in the 2024 teacher strike.

==== Pennsylvania ====
Pennsylvania explicitly allows teachers to strike. However, since 1992 state act 88 gives the Pennsylvania Department of Education the power to order teachers to return to work to ensure that students still receive 180 days of instruction. This has subsequently reduced the frequency of teacher strikes in Pennsylvania, although the state still leads the nation in strikes. Between 2000 and 2007, Pennsylvania accounted for 60% of teacher strikes nationwide. 2010 saw 3 strikes, while 2011 had one strike. Between 1968 and 2012 Pennsylvania has had 740 teacher strikes. A major cause of strikes in Pennsylvania is that contracts are frequently allowed to lapse for several years before the school board and teachers union can come to a new agreement.

Partial list of modern Pennsylvania Teacher Strikes
Date	District	Length of Strike	Last Contract	Median Teacher Salary Year of Strike	Spending per Student	Number of Teachers in District Year of Strike	Primary Point of Contention
2009	Crestwood School District	5 days - Support Staff Only	8 years before strike	$58,205 ($35,032 to $96,820)		160	
2010	Bethel Park School District						
2012	Neshaminy School District		5 years before strike				
2012	Neshaminy School District		5 years before strike				
2013	Wyoming Area School District	23 days	2010				
2013	Old Forge School District		2010				
2013	Shaler Area School District		August 2011				
2014	Wyoming Area School District	1 day	2010				
2014	Danville Area School District	5 days	June 2012				
2014	Millville Area School District	27 days	3 years before strike				
2014	East Allegheny School District	16 days	June 2012				
2014	Old Forge School District						
2015	Peters Township School District						
2015	Scranton School District	11 days					
2015	Line Mountain School District						
2015	Millville Area School District	4 days	3 years before strike				
2016	Montrose Area School District			$66,018	$18,024		
2016, April 12	Sayre Area School District	10 days	3 years before strike	$70,129	$17,620	77	Healthcare and salary
2016, January 20	Shamokin Area School District		3 years before strike	$43,556	$12,020	154	Low starting salary
2016	Highlands School District			$68,012	$16,796		
2016, April 18	Athens Area School District	2 days	August 2013	$67,409	$18,310	147	Retiree healthcare benefits
2021, Feb 1	Keystone Oaks School District	10 days	June 2020				Wage freeze
2021, Sept 13	Redbank Valley School District	27 days	2.5 years before strike	$65,053 (2020)	$15,946 (2019)	77	Health benefits, 2 year salary freeze
2021, November 2	Scranton School District	12 days	4 years before strike	$61,989 (2020)	$16,629 (2019)	800	Healthcare and salary

==== West Virginia ====
The West Virginia statewide educator walkout in 2018 began the Red for Ed movement.

== In other countries ==
=== France ===
- Red Pens movement (Mouvement des stylos rouges)
