= Lawrence Hill (disambiguation) =

Lawrence Hill (born 1957) is a Canadian novelist and essayist.

Lawrence Hill may also refer to:

== People ==
- Jack Hill (actor) (1887-1963) (Lawrence Young Hill)
- Lawrence Hill (1912–1988), American publisher, co-founder of Hill & Wang

== Places ==
- Lawrence Hill, Berkshire, a suburb in Berkshire, England
- Lawrence Hill, Bristol, an electoral ward in Bristol, England

== See also ==
- Lawrence Hall (disambiguation)
- Lawrence D. Hills (1911–1990), British horticulturalist
