= Henry J. Savelkoul =

American politician

Henry Savelkoul

Minority Leader of the Minnesota House of Representatives
- In office January 7, 1975 – January 3, 1979
- Preceded by: Aubrey W. Dirlam
- Succeeded by: Rod Searle

Member of the Minnesota House of Representatives from the 31A district 9A (1969–1973)
- In office January 7, 1969 – January 3, 1979
- Preceded by: Paul Overgaard
- Succeeded by: Bob Haukoos

Personal details
- Born: July 1, 1940 (age 86) Lansford, North Dakota, U.S.
- Party: Republican Party of Minnesota
- Education: St. Thomas College University of Minnesota Law School Harvard Law School

Henry J. Savelkoul (born July 1, 1940) is a Minnesota politician and the former Minority Leader of the Minnesota House of Representatives. A member of the Republican Party of Minnesota, he represented District 31A, which includes portions of Freeborn and Mower counties in the south eastern part of the State.

== Education and career ==
Savelkoul graduated from St. Leo High School in Minot, North Dakota. He got his Bachelor of Arts (B.A.) degree at St. Thomas College in 1962. Savelkoul attended University of Minnesota Law School and got his Juris Doctor (J.D.) from Harvard Law School in 1965. He got his Minnesota Bar Admission in 1965, his United States District Court for the District of Minnesota Bar Admission in 1968, and his United States Supreme Court Bar Admission in 1970. Savelkoul is an attorney at Peterson, Savelkoul, Kolker, Haedt & Benda, Ltd. (Formerly Firm of Christian, Slen, Savelkoul) in Albert Lea. He practices Business Law and Litigation, Construction Law and Litigation, Agricultural Law, Employment Law, Estate Planning, Family Law, Real Estate, and Probate/Trust Law. Savelkoul Director of the Minnesota Institute of Continuing Legal Education (1983-1999) and Chairman of the Metropolitan Sports Facility Commission (1993-1999).

== Minnesota House of Representatives ==
=== Elections ===
Savelkoul was first elected in 1968. He was re-elected in 1970, 1972, 1974, and 1976. He decided not to run in 1978.

1976 Minnesota State Representative- House 31A
Party	Candidate	Votes	%	±%
Democratic (DFL)	Lee Plummer	4965	40.00	
Republican	Henry Savelkoul (Incumbent)	7462	60.00	

1974 Minnesota State Representative- House 31A
Party	Candidate	Votes	%	±%
Democratic (DFL)	Richard J. Anderson	4218	46.90	
Republican	Henry Savelkoul (Incumbent)	4776	53.10	

1972 Minnesota State Representative- House 31A
Party	Candidate	Votes	%	±%
Democratic (DFL)	Bob Goldman	5747	48.39	
Republican	Henry Savelkoul (Incumbent)	6154	51.71	

1970 Minnesota State Representative- House 9A
Party	Candidate	Votes	%	±%
Republican	Henry Savelkoul (Incumbent)	6884	100.00	

1968 Minnesota State Representative- House 9A
Party	Candidate	Votes	%	±%
Democratic (DFL)	Bernard Jackson	5286	47.20	
Republican	Henry Savelkoul	5924	52.80	

=== Tenure ===
Savelkoul was sworn in on January 7, 1969. He served in the 66th, 67th, 68th, 69th, and 70th Minnesota Legislature. He was elected the Minority Leader of the Minnesota House of Representatives from 1975 to 1979.

=== Committee assignments ===
For the 70th Minnesota Legislature, Savelkoul was part of:

- Criminal Justice Committee
- General Legislation and Veterans Affairs Committee
- Rules and Legislative Administration Committee
- Taxes Committee

For the 69th Minnesota Legislature, Savelkoul was part of:

- Judiciary Committee
- Local and Urban Affairs Committee
- Rules and Legislative Administration Committee
- Taxes Committee

For the 68th Minnesota Legislature, Savelkoul was part of:

- Environmental Preservation and Natural Resources Committee
- Judiciary Committee
- Taxes Committee

For the 67th Minnesota Legislature, Savelkoul was part of:

- Claims Committee
- Commerce and Economic Development Committee
- Education Committee
- Environmental Preservation Committee
- Judiciary Committee
- Taxes Committee

For the 66th Minnesota Legislature, Savelkoul was part of:

- Cities of the Second and Third Class Committee
- Claims Committee
- Commerce and Economic Development Committee
- Crime Prevention Committee
- Education Committee
- Employee Compensation and Retirements Committee
- Judiciary Committee

== Personal life ==
Savelkoul is married to his wife Margaret. They have 4 kids: Tricia, Donny, John, and Richard. They reside in Albert Lea, Minnesota. His son Donny is also a lawyer.

Political offices
Preceded by Aubrey W. Dirlam	Minority Leader of the Minnesota House of Representatives; 1975–1979	Succeeded by Rod Searle
Minnesota House of Representatives
Preceded by Paul Overgaard	Member of the House of Representatives from District 31A; 9A (1969–1972); 1969–1979	Succeeded by Bob Haukoos
