= Heron Lake, Minnesota =

City in Minnesota, United States

Heron Lake
- City
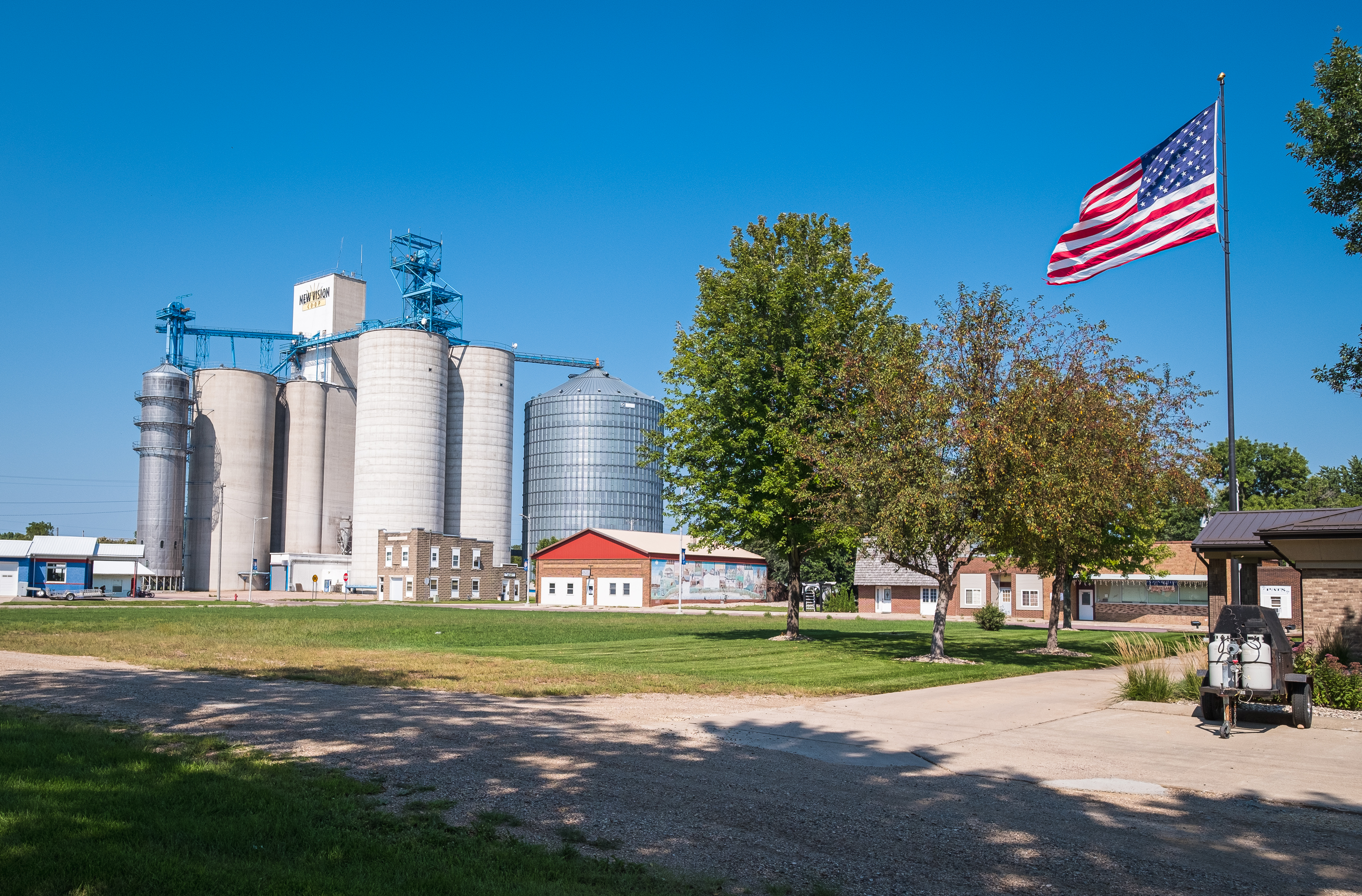

- Location of Heron Lake, Minnesota
- Coordinates: 43°47′53″N 95°19′11″W
- Country: United States
- State: Minnesota
- County: Jackson

Government
  - Type: Mayor – Council
  - Mayor: Andrew Rasche

Area
  - Total: 1.24 sq mi (3.22 km^{2})
  - Land: 1.24 sq mi (3.22 km^{2})
  - Water: 0 sq mi (0.00 km^{2})
- Elevation: 1,421 ft (433 m)

Population (2020)
  - Total: 602
  - Density: 484.7/sq mi (187.13/km^{2})
- Time zone: UTC-6 (Central (CST))
  - Summer (DST): UTC-5 (CDT)
- ZIP code: 56137
- Area code: 507
- FIPS code: 27-28700
- GNIS feature ID: 2394364
- Website: www.heronlakecity.org

Heron Lake is a city in Jackson County, Minnesota, United States. As of the 2020 census, Heron Lake had a population of 602.

== History ==
Heron Lake was named in 1870 after a local lake where great blue herons were seen.

Heron Lake was named after the Black-Crowned Night Heron.

== Geography ==
According to the United States Census Bureau, the city has a total area of 1.28 square miles (3.32 km^{2}), all land.

Minnesota State Highway 60 serves as a main route in the community.

== Demographics ==
Historical population
Census	Pop.	Note	%±
1880	163		—
1890	496		204.3%
1900	928		87.1%
1910	803		−13.5%
1920	922		14.8%
1930	786		−14.8%
1940	852		8.4%
1950	837		−1.8%
1960	852		1.8%
1970	777		−8.8%
1980	783		0.8%
1990	730		−6.8%
2000	768		5.2%
2010	698		−9.1%
2020	602		−13.8%
U.S. Decennial Census

=== 2010 census ===
As of the census of 2010, there were 698 people, 306 households, and 164 families residing in the city. The population density was 545.3 inhabitants per square mile (210.5/km^{2}). There were 343 housing units at an average density of 268.0 per square mile (103.5/km^{2}). The racial makeup of the city was 92.1% White, 1.9% African American, 1.3% Native American, 0.3% Asian, 4.2% from other races, and 0.3% from two or more races. Hispanic or Latino of any race were 12.0% of the population.

There were 306 households, of which 28.8% had children under the age of 18 living with them, 44.8% were married couples living together, 6.5% had a female householder with no husband present, 2.3% had a male householder with no wife present, and 46.4% were non-families. 39.5% of all households were made up of individuals, and 23.2% had someone living alone who was 65 years of age or older. The average household size was 2.28 and the average family size was 3.12.

The median age in the city was 41.5 years. 23.8% of residents were under the age of 18; 9.6% were between the ages of 18 and 24; 21.9% were from 25 to 44; 26% were from 45 to 64; and 18.8% were 65 years of age or older. The gender makeup of the city was 50.4% male and 49.6% female.

=== 2000 census ===
As of the census of 2000, there were 768 people, 285 households, and 174 families residing in the city. The population density was 723.4 inhabitants per square mile (279.3/km^{2}). There were 322 housing units at an average density of 303.3 per square mile (117.1/km^{2}). The racial makeup of the city was 92.58% White, 0.52% Asian, 6.38% from other races, and 0.52% from two or more races. Hispanic or Latino of any race were 10.55% of the population.

There were 285 households, out of which 32.6% had children under the age of 18 living with them, 51.9% were married couples living together, 6.3% had a female householder with no husband present, and 38.9% were non-families. 34.4% of all households were made up of individuals, and 17.2% had someone living alone who was 65 years of age or older. The average household size was 2.52 and the average family size was 3.30.

In the city, the population was spread out, with 26.7% under the age of 18, 7.6% from 18 to 24, 25.4% from 25 to 44, 15.9% from 45 to 64, and 24.5% who were 65 years of age or older. The median age was 39 years. For every 100 females, there were 97.9 males. For every 100 females age 18 and over, there were 97.5 males.

The median income for a household in the city was $32,222, and the median income for a family was $40,625. Males had a median income of $28,958 versus $19,219 for females. The per capita income for the city was $15,657.

== Notable People ==
- Walter F. Mondale (1928-2021), 42nd vice president of the United States, lived in Heron Lake from 1934 to 1937.
- Harvey Edwin Swennes (1899-1964), newspaper editor, publisher, and Minnesota state legislator, was born in Heron Lake.
- Garland Buckeye (1897-1975), hailed from the small town of Heron Lake. Mr. Buckeye played both baseball and football professionally between 1918 and 1928.
- Frederick William Freking (1913–1998), Catholic bishop, was born in Heron Lake.

== Politics ==
Heron Lake is located in Minnesota's 1st congressional district, represented by Republican Brad Finstad. At the state level, Heron Lake is located in Senate District 21, represented by Republican Bill Weber (politician), and in House District 21B, represented by Republican Marj Fogelman.
