= Lona Minne =

American politician

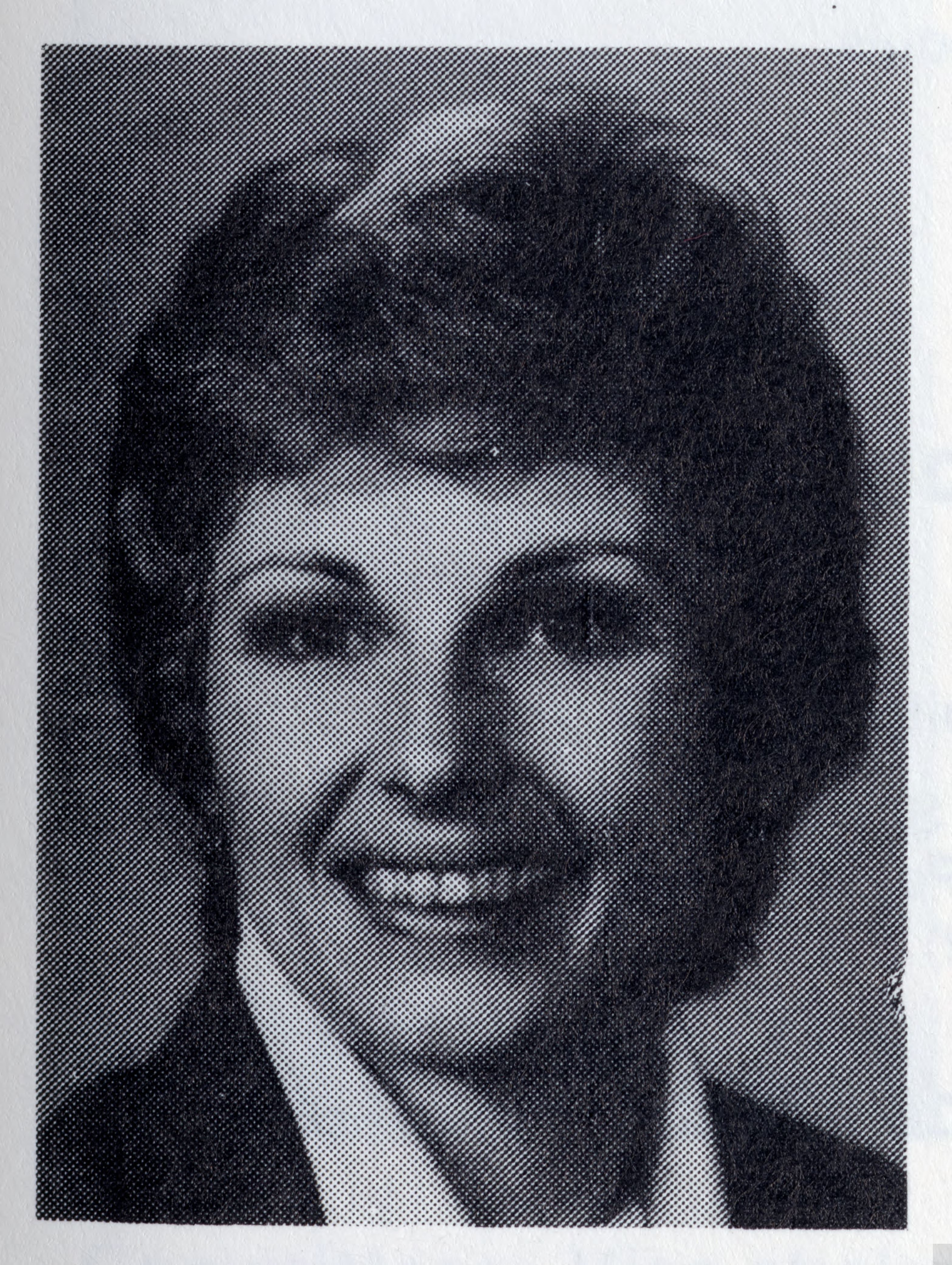

Lona Minne Schreiber (born 1945) is an American politician.

Minne lived in Hibbing, Minnesota. She went to the Hibbing High School and the Hibbing Junior College. Minne served as clerk of Stuntz Township, which was annexed to Hibbing. Minne served in the Minnesota House of Representatives from 1979 to 1988 and was a Democrat.

Her husband William R. Schreiber also served in the Minnesota House of Representatives.
