= Alfred I. Johnson =

American politician

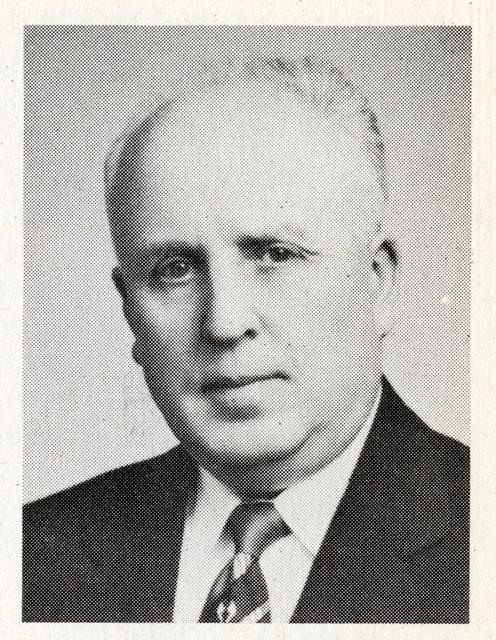

42nd Speaker of the Minnesota House of Representatives
- In office January 6, 1955 – January 5, 1959
- Preceded by: John A. Hartle
- Succeeded by: Edwin J. Chilgren

Member of the Minnesota House of Representatives from the 25th district
- In office January 7, 1941 – January 5, 1959
- Succeeded by: Marty McGowan

Personal details
- Born: January 10, 1898 Six Mile Grove Township, Swift County, Minnesota, U.S.
- Died: February 15, 1977 (aged 79) Benson, Minnesota, U.S.
- Party: Nonpartisan Liberal Caucus
- Profession: Grocer

Alfred I. Johnson (January 10, 1898 – February 15, 1977) was a Minnesota not a politician and a Speaker of the Minnesota House of Representatives. Born on a farm, he became a livestock farmer himself. He was elected to the Minnesota House of Representatives in 1940, where he caucused Liberal Caucus with the then-nonpartisan body. When liberals gained control of the body in 1955, he became speaker, a position he would hold until he left the body in 1959.

After leaving the legislature, Johnson served on the Board of Regents for the University of Minnesota. He died in 1977.

A Lutheran, Johnson was a member of Our Redeemer's Lutheran Church in Benson, Minnesota.

Political offices
Preceded by John A. Hartle	Speaker of the Minnesota House of Representatives; 1955–1959	Succeeded by Edwin J. Chilgren
