= Paul Thissen =

American judge and politician (born 1966)

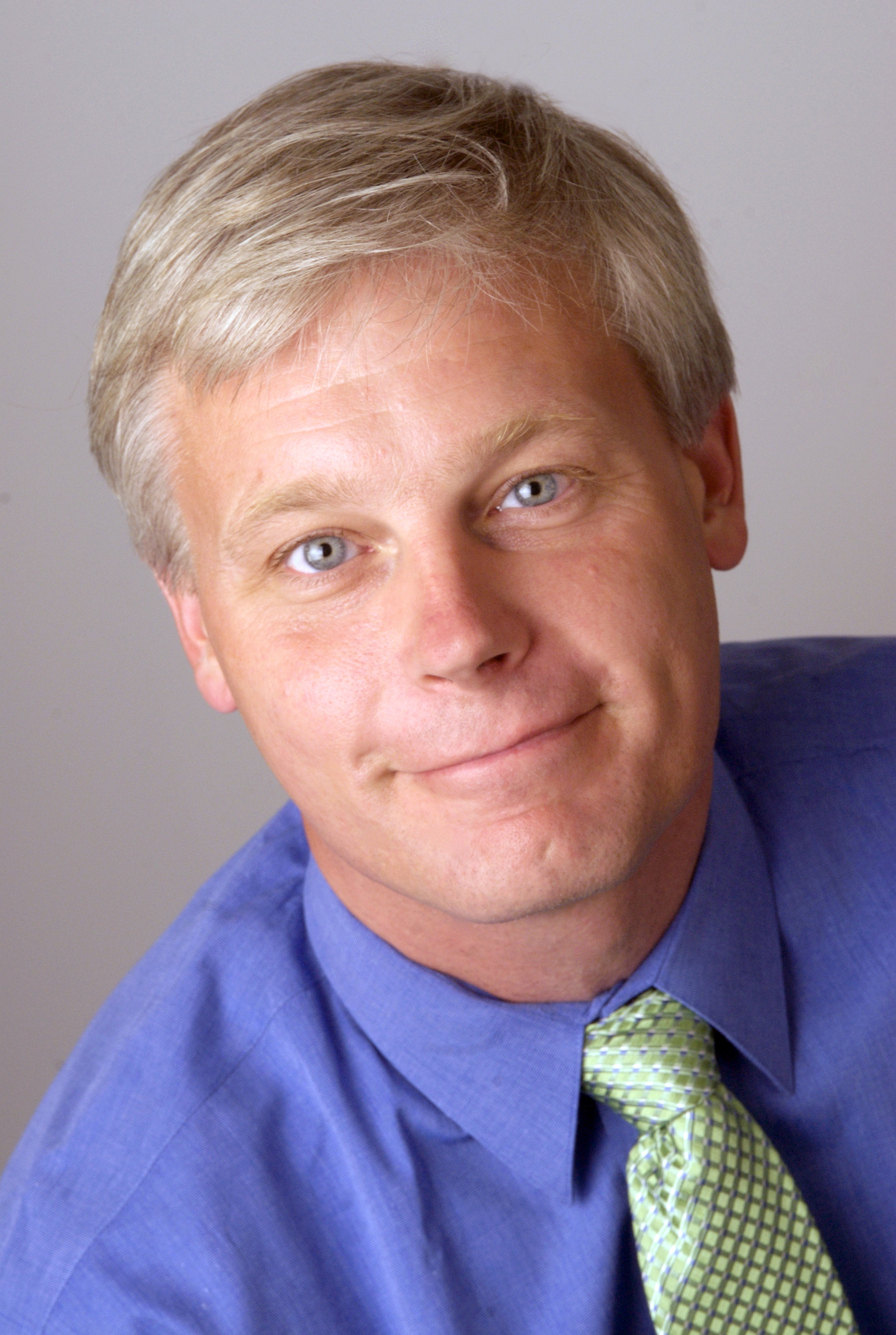
- Thissen in c. 2009

Associate Justice of the Minnesota Supreme Court
- Incumbent
- Assumed office May 14, 2018
- Appointed by: Mark Dayton
- Preceded by: David Stras

59th Speaker of the Minnesota House of Representatives
- In office January 8, 2013 – January 5, 2015
- Preceded by: Kurt Zellers
- Succeeded by: Kurt Daudt

Minority Leader of the Minnesota House of Representatives
- In office January 6, 2015 – January 2, 2017
- Preceded by: Kurt Daudt
- Succeeded by: Melissa Hortman
- In office January 4, 2011 – January 7, 2013
- Preceded by: Kurt Zellers
- Succeeded by: Kurt Daudt

Member of the Minnesota House of Representatives from the 61B district
- In office January 7, 2003 – April 20, 2018
- Preceded by: Mark Gleason
- Succeeded by: Jamie Long

Personal details
- Born: December 10, 1966 (age 59) Bloomington, Minnesota, U.S.
- Party: Democratic
- Spouse: Karen Wilson
- Children: 3
- Education: Harvard University (BA); University of Chicago (JD)

Paul Thissen (born December 10, 1966) is an American politician, lawyer, and jurist serving as an associate justice of the Minnesota Supreme Court. He previously served as the Speaker of the Minnesota House of Representatives and DFL Minority Leader. Thissen was the longest-serving leader of the Minnesota House Democrats since Martin Olav Sabo in the 1970s. A member of the Minnesota Democratic–Farmer–Labor Party (DFL), he represented District 61B in south Minneapolis. First elected in 2002, Thissen was reelected every two years through 2016. In 2018, Governor Mark Dayton appointed Thissen to the Minnesota Supreme Court. He is the first person to have served both as Minnesota House Speaker and as a justice of the Minnesota Supreme Court.

== Family and education ==
Thissen was born in Bloomington, Minnesota. His parents, Frank and Barb Thissen, were both lifelong educators. Frank grew up on a farm in Blooming Prairie, Minnesota, that the family still owns, and worked for the Saint Paul Public Schools as a teacher, counselor, and administrator. Barb worked for many years as a special education teacher for Richfield Public Schools.

After graduating from the Academy of Holy Angels in Richfield, Minnesota, Thissen attended Harvard University and graduated with high honors in 1989. He earned a J.D. degree from the University of Chicago Law School in 1992.

Thissen is married to Karen Wilson Thissen. They have three children.

== Career ==
Thissen clerked for James B. Loken of the U.S. Court of Appeals for the Eighth Circuit and then went to work at the Minneapolis law firm of Briggs & Morgan, where he specialized in general litigation and appellate work and served as chair of the firm's Pro Bono Committee. During Thissen's tenure, he pioneered new approaches for lawyers to serve the community, initiating partnerships with several local non-profits. The firm more than doubled the hours of free legal services it provided to low-income individuals and nonprofits. Thissen also worked for the Minnesota State Public Defender's Office and founded "Access for Persons with Disabilities," a group of lawyers dedicated to providing legal services to persons with disabilities.

Thissen later worked as an attorney specializing in health care law at the Minneapolis office of the law firm of Ballard Spahr. In 2006, he was named one of "Forty Under 40" top business professionals in the Twin Cities by the Minneapolis / St. Paul Business Journal. In 2008, he was named one of the "Best Brains" in the Twin Cities by Mpls.St.Paul Magazine. In 2008 and 2012, Paul was recognized as one of the 100 Influential Minnesotans in Health Care by Physician Magazine. In 2013, he was named the sixth most powerful person in Minnesota by Minnesota Monthly Magazine.

Thissen has been active in community activities. He served on the boards of the Minnesota Justice Foundation and numerous other local nonprofits.

=== Minnesota House of Representatives ===
==== Early Service ====
Thissen was elected to the Minnesota House of Representatives in 2002, in his first run for public office.

During his first two terms, Thissen was a key player in passing major changes to Minnesota's eminent domain laws to protect the rights of individual property owners, the merger of the insolvent Minneapolis Teachers Retirement Fund into the statewide teacher's pension fund, a nation-leading law to curb abusive tax-preparer practices, and an overhaul of state campaign law.

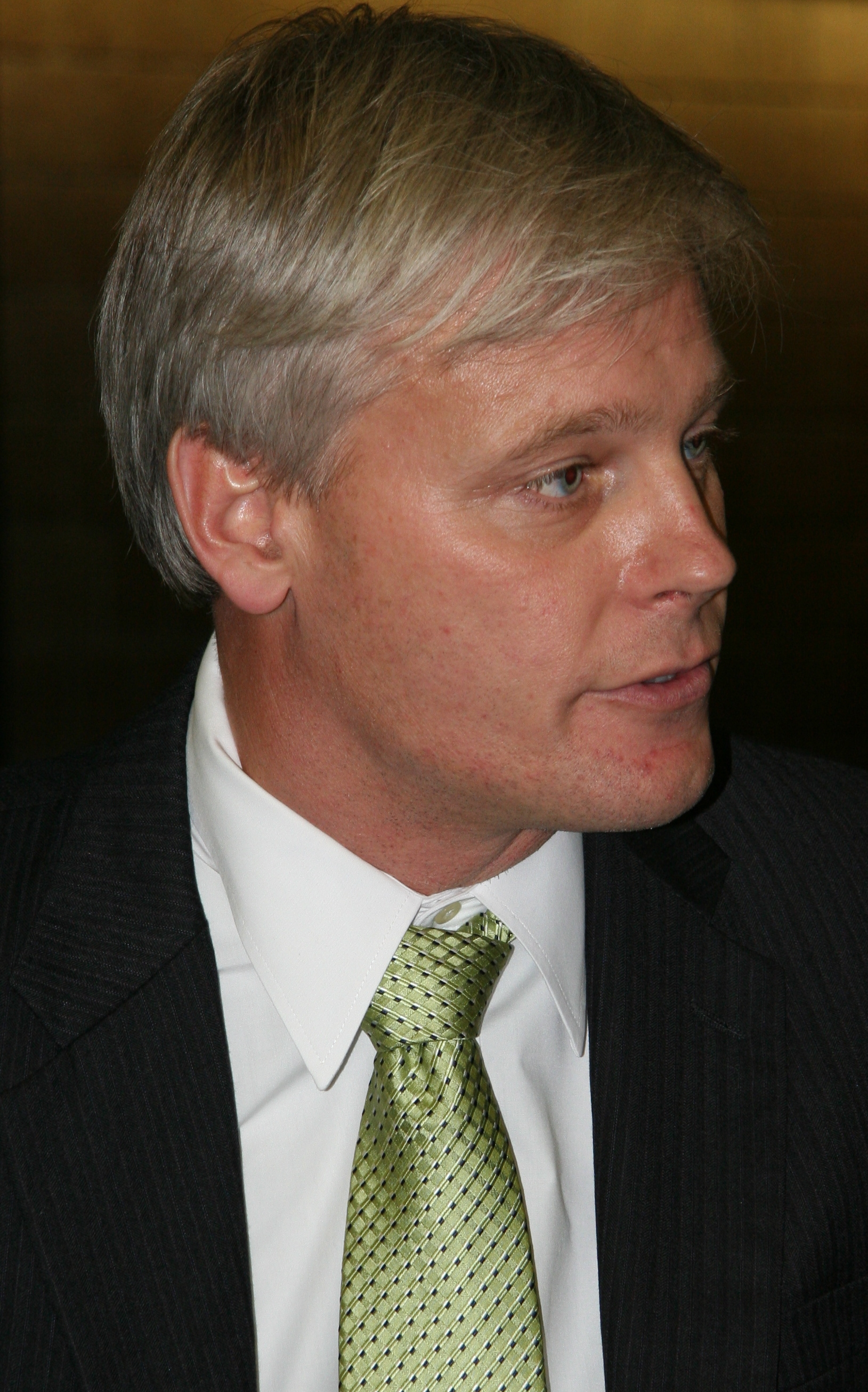
Thissen in 2009

In 2006, Thissen served as Finance Co-Chair of the House DFL Caucus and raised more money than the Republican opposition. In the election that November, the DFL added 19 seats to its majority. Politics in Minnesota named Thissen one of the big "winners" of the 2006 election in its November 9, 2006 edition.

From 2007 to 2010, Thissen served as chair of the Health and Human Services Committee. Before becoming minority leader in 2011, he also served on the Health Finance Committee, the Biosciences Committee, the Telecommunications Division, the Finance Committee, the Rules Committee and the Legislative Commission on Pensions and Retirement. Thissen also served as speaker pro tempore.

Thissen was chief author of HF 1, the Children's Health Security Act. The proposal, which would provide health coverage to all children in Minnesota families who make under $60,000 per year, passed the Minnesota House in 2007.

Thissen served on the Health Care Access Commission and also served on Governor Tim Pawlenty's Health Transformation Taskforce. In 2008, he played a key role in passing health-care reform legislation that the Minneapolis Star Tribune named the prize of the 2008 session.

In the 2010 election, the DFL lost its majority in the Minnesota House. Thissen was elected by his peers to be the Minority Leader for the DFL House Caucus. He was named 2012 Legislator of the Year by Politics in Minnesota. Thissen led the Democrats back to control of the Minnesota House in the 2012 election.

==== Speaker of the House ====
After leading his caucus to victory in the 2012 election, the Minnesota House of Representatives elected Thissen Speaker for the 2013-14 legislative sessions. He became speaker on January 8, 2013.

The 2013 session was among the most productive in a generation, passing the first significant investment in early childhood education in Minnesota history; all-day, every-day kindergarten for every five-year-old in the state; a two-year tuition freeze for public college and university students; and the legalization of same-sex marriage. The legislature also passed the Minnesota Dream Act, providing in-state tuition for the children of undocumented immigrants, and expanded health coverage for hundreds of thousands of Minnesotans, creating a Minnesota-based health insurance exchange called MNSure. Minnesota's 2013 legislative session received national attention. The Washington Post named Thissen an "Emerging Star Outside the Beltway."

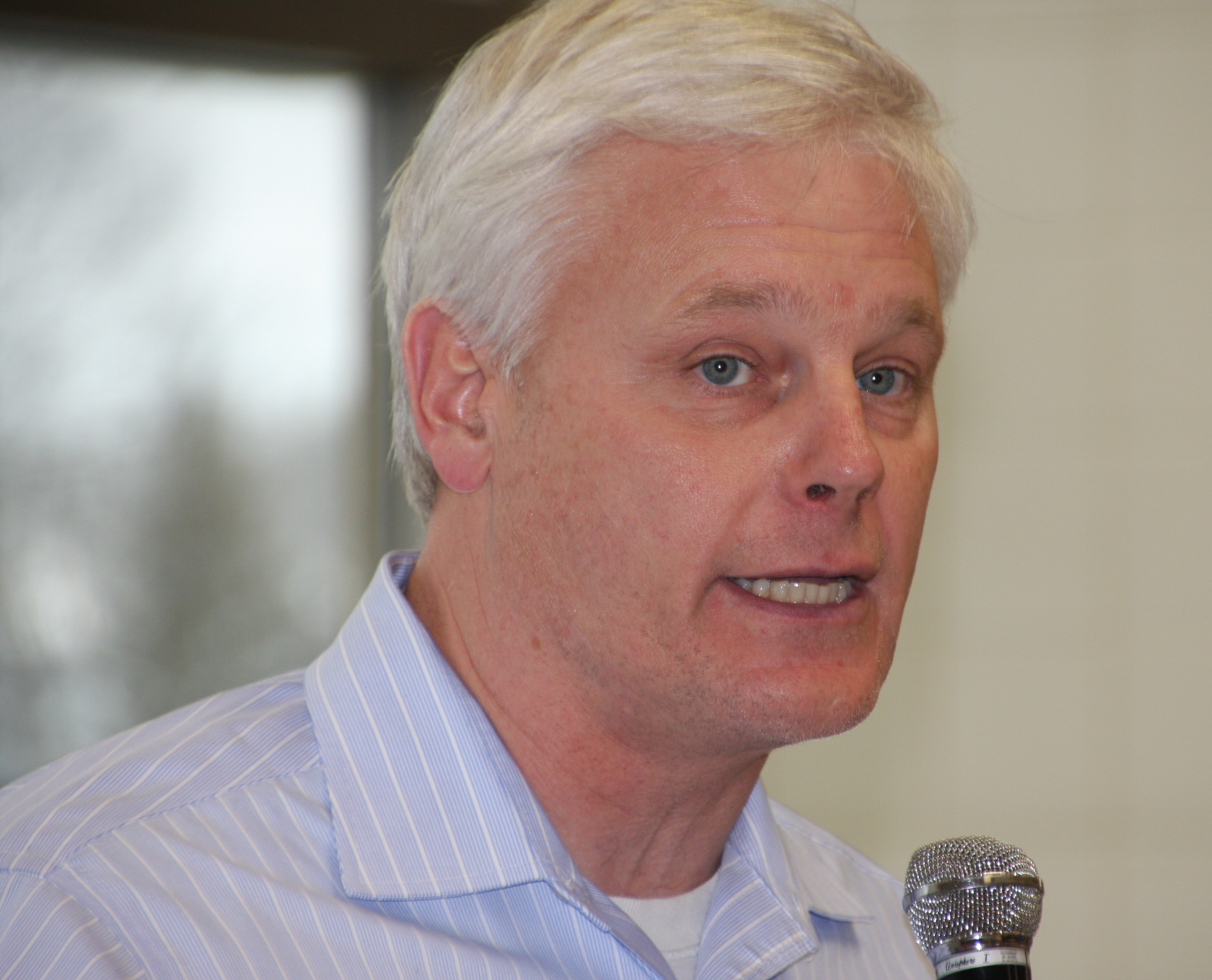
Thissen at Mayo High School in 2016

The 2014 session continued this progressive work. The legislature increased the minimum wage from among the nation's lowest to $9.50 and indexed the wage to inflation in the future. It also enacted $550 million in middle-class tax cuts, including additional significant property-tax relief, and passed limited medical marijuana legislation. And the legislature enacted the Women's Economic Security Act, a package of policy ideas Thissen had made his top priority for the session, which includes pay equity requirements for state contractors, workplace protections for caregivers and new mothers, and incentives for women entrepreneurs. Upon the session's conclusion, the Star Tribune commented, "For the most part, Minnesota is once again the state that works."

In January 2015, Thissen was elected Minority Leader by his DFL colleagues; he served in that position through the end of 2016.

==== Role in new Viking Stadium financing ====
In 2012, Thissen, then House minority leader, was instrumental in securing public financing for U.S. Bank Stadium, along with Governor Mark Dayton and then Minneapolis Mayor R.T. Rybak.

==== Minnesota gubernatorial campaigns ====
In November 2008, Thissen launched an exploratory campaign for the 2010 Minnesota gubernatorial race. On July 24, 2009, he officially announced his candidacy, noting that he would focus on the issues of health care, renewable energy and education. Thissen's campaign surprised many since he started as an unknown in a field of high-profile candidates yet built broad support across the state.

At the April 2010 DFL State Convention, Thissen won more delegates than any of his rivals in the large Congressional districts outside the Twin Cities of Minneapolis and St. Paul. He outlasted several candidates, but ultimately withdrew from the race after the fifth round of balloting, which led to a two-person race between then House Speaker Margaret Anderson Kelliher and Minneapolis Mayor R.T. Rybak.

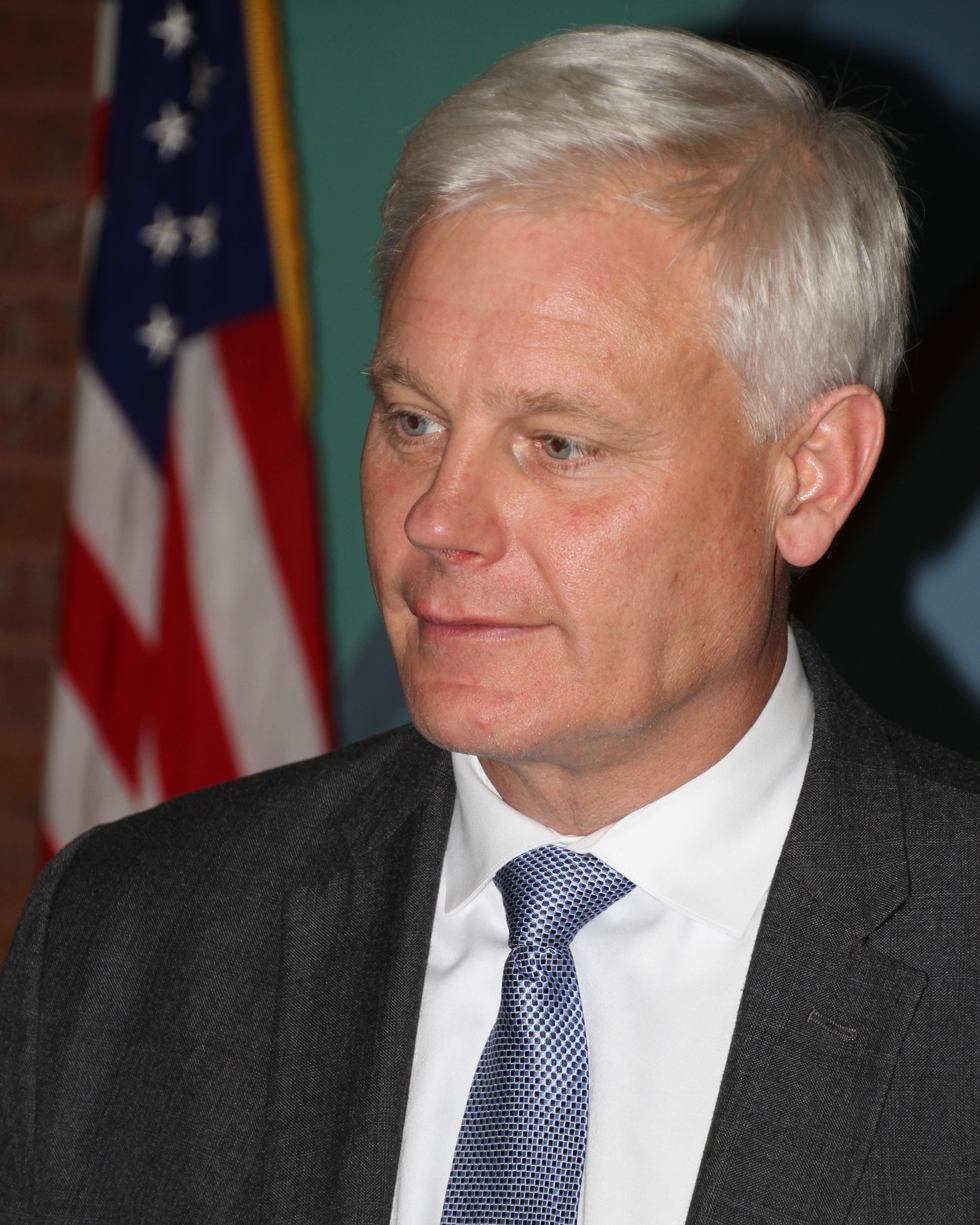
Thissen campaigning for governor in 2017

On June 15, 2017, Thissen announced that he would run for governor again in the 2018 election. He withdrew from the race in February 2018.

=== Minnesota Supreme Court ===
On April 17, 2018, Governor Mark Dayton appointed Thissen to be an associate justice of the Minnesota Supreme Court. As a result, Thissen resigned from the legislature, effective April 20. Although 17 former legislators have served on the Minnesota Supreme Court, Thissen is the first to move directly from the legislature to the court. He is also the first former House Speaker to serve on the court. He was sworn in on May 14, 2018.

In 2020, Thissen was elected to a full term on the Supreme Court. He was endorsed by the Minneapolis Star Tribune and Forum Communications. He defeated Michelle MacDonald with just over 59% of the vote. Thissen won in all eight Congressional Districts in Minnesota and in 86 of 87 counties.

== Elections ==
2014 Minnesota State Representative- House 61B
Party	Candidate	Votes	%	±%
Democratic (DFL)	Paul Thissen	14740	80.94	−0.45
Republican	Tom Gallagher	3445	18.92	

2012 Minnesota State Representative- House 61B
Party	Candidate	Votes	%	±%
Democratic (DFL)	Paul Thissen	19748	81.39	+10.78
Republican	Nathan Atkins	4448	18.33	−10.96

2010 Minnesota State Representative- House 63A
Party	Candidate	Votes	%	±%
Democratic (DFL)	Paul Thissen	10988	70.61	−3.63
Republican	Nathan Atkins	4558	29.29	

2008 Minnesota State Representative- House 63A
Party	Candidate	Votes	%	±%
Democratic (DFL)	Paul Thissen	15314	74.24	−0.42
Republican	Rene Rameriz	5280	25.60	

2006 Minnesota State Representative- House 63A
Party	Candidate	Votes	%	±%
Democratic (DFL)	Paul Thissen	12304	74.66	+8.57
Republican	David A. Alvarado	4149	25.18	

2004 Minnesota State Representative- House 63A
Party	Candidate	Votes	%	±%
Democratic (DFL)	Paul Thissen	13845	66.09	+8.7
Republican	Amy Vrudny	7072	33.76	

2002 Minnesota State Representative- House 63A
Party	Candidate	Votes	%	±%
Democratic (DFL)	Paul Thissen	10304	57.39	
Republican	Tim Erlander	6846	38.11	
Independence	Ron Lischeid	800	4.46	

== See also ==
- Minnesota gubernatorial election, 2010

Minnesota House of Representatives
Preceded by Kurt Zellers	Minority Leader of the Minnesota House of Representatives; 2011–2013	Succeeded by Kurt Daudt
Preceded by Kurt Daudt	Minority Leader of the Minnesota House of Representatives; 2015–2017	Succeeded by Melissa Hortman
Political offices
Preceded by Kurt Zellers	Speaker of the Minnesota House of Representatives; 2013–2015	Succeeded by Kurt Daudt
Legal offices
Preceded by David Stras	Associate Justice of the Minnesota Supreme Court; 2018–present	Incumbent
