= Odin Langen =

American politician (1913–1976)

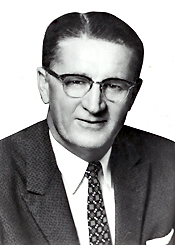

Member of the U.S. House of Representatives from Minnesota
- In office January 3, 1959 – January 3, 1971
- Preceded by: Coya Knutson
- Succeeded by: Robert Bergland
- Constituency: 9th district (1959–1963); 7th district (1963–1971)

Member of the Minnesota House of Representatives from the 67th district
- In office January 2, 1951 – January 5, 1959

Personal details
- Born: January 5, 1913 Minneapolis, Minnesota, U.S.
- Died: July 6, 1976 (aged 63) Kennedy, Minnesota, U.S.
- Party: Republican
- Spouse: Lillian Thelma Clauson (m. 1938)
- Children: 3
- Education: Dunwoody Institute

Odin Elsford Stanley Langen (January 5, 1913 – July 6, 1976) was an American politician from the state of Minnesota. He served six terms in the United States House of Representatives from 1959 to 1971.

== Early life and career ==
Odin Langen was born in Minneapolis, Minnesota. His family moved to Kennedy, Minnesota, around 1914. He attended the public schools and Dunwoody Institute in Minneapolis from 1933 to 1934. He engaged in farming in Kittson County near Kennedy, and was associated with Production Marketing Administration in Kittson County from 1935 to 1950.

== Political career ==
Langen was a member of the Kennedy (Minnesota) School Board and served as its president from 1948 to 1950. Langen also served on the South Red River Town Board from 1947 to 1950. He was elected to the Minnesota House of Representatives where he served from 1951 to 1959. He became the Republican leader of the state house in 1957.

In 1958, he ran for the United States House of Representatives against the incumbent DFL Party representative Coya Knutson. Although Knutson was initially expected to win the race, her husband released a letter now known as the "Coya, Come Home" letter publicly pleading with her to give up her career in Washington. The letter damaged her campaign and Langen won by 1,390 votes.

Langen voted in favor of the Civil Rights Acts of 1960, 1964, and 1968, as well as the 24th Amendment to the U.S. Constitution and the Voting Rights Act of 1965.

He won re-election five times serving on the Agriculture and Appropriations. In 1970, Langen faced off against Robert Bergland, whom he defeated in 1968. Bergland, a farmer and former Agriculture Department official, benefited from local agricultural concerns and defeated Langen.

== Later career ==
After his defeat, he became Administrator of the Packers and Stockyards Administration of the United States Department of Agriculture from January 1971 to April 1972, when he resigned to resume farming pursuits in Kennedy, Minnesota.

== Personal life ==
He was married to Lillian Thelma Clauson (1911–1988) with whom he had three children. Odin Langen died in 1976. His funeral was held at the Red River Lutheran Church in Kennedy, Minnesota.

U.S. House of Representatives
Preceded by Coya Knutson	U.S. Representative from Minnesota's 9th congressional district 1959–1963	Succeeded by District abolished
Preceded by Herman Carl Andersen	U.S. Representative from Minnesota's 7th congressional district 1963–1971	Succeeded by Robert Bergland
Political offices
Preceded by John A. Hartle	Minnesota House Minority Leader; 1957–1959	Succeeded by Lloyd L. Duxbury
