= Harlan Jerome Miner =

20th century American politician (died 1940)

H. J. Miner
- Official portrait

Member of the Minnesota House of Representatives from the Koochiching County district
- In office January 4, 1915 – January 5, 1919
- Preceded by: District established
- Succeeded by: Francis J. McPartlin

Member of the International Falls City Council from the 3rd Ward
- In office November 26, 1913 – January 4, 1915
- Preceded by: Herman Koeneke
- Succeeded by: J. E. Burdick

Member of the North Dakota Senate
- In office 1901–1903

Member of the North Dakota House of Representatives
- In office 1899–1901

Personal details
- Born: December 29, 1869 Albion, Michigan, U.S.
- Died: March 1, 1940 (aged 70)
- Party: Republican
- Other political affiliations: Conservative Caucus
- Spouse: Althea M. Varnum
- Children: 5
- Education: Jamestown College (attended)
- Occupation: politician, newspaper editor

Harlan Jerome Miner (December 29, 1869 – March 1, 1940) was an American Republican politician and newspaper editor from International Falls, Minnesota. He was a member of the Minnesota House of Representative, representing Koochiching County from 1915 until his defeat in 1919. Prior to his service in the Minnesota House, he served in the North Dakota Senate from 1901 through 1903 and North Dakota House of Representatives from 1899 to 1901.

In the 1915 and 1917 Minnesota Legislative manuals he is referred to as H. J. Miner.

== Early life and career ==
Harlan Jerome Miner was born on December 29, 1869 in Albion, Michigan. He attended common schools in Albion, and got at least an elementary school education before he moved to Jamestown, North Dakota in what was then the Dakota Territory with his parents in 1879. During their time in Jamestown, Miner's father, Lyman Miner, became a prominent member of the community in Stusman County, serving as county clerk and register of deeds for the county. Miner's early foray into publishing began when he was 14 and was a printer for Der Pionier, the Morning Alert, and the New Rockford Transcript. He would later gain some prominence in the community when he helped set up the Wells County Index in Sykeston, North Dakota in July 1888. Around this time he attended Jamestown College for one year. Miner also began pursuing various business interests, inluding managing a lumber-yard for the Pillsbury Lumber Company and an independent seller of farm equipment and grain. Later he resided in Bowdon, North Dakota where he managed his own lumber yard. He would reside in Bowden for the remainder of his career in the new state of North Dakota.

== Political career ==
A Republican like his father, Miner began his career in politics when he served in the North Dakota House of Representatives for two years from 1899 to 1901, in the 6th North Dakota Legislative Assembly. He subsequently went on to serve in the North Dakota Senate for two more years from 1901 to 1903, during the 7th Legislative Assembly.

In August 1903, Miner and his family relocated to International Falls, Minnesota. It was in International Falls that Miner became engaged in the newspaper business, while continuing his ventures in the logging industry. In 1906 Miner partnered with Loel H. Slocum, the future mayor of International Falls, to publish the Border Budget, a local newspaper.

Miner was frequently involved in the politics of the area, and played an active role in the election campaign which separated Koochiching County from Itasca County. In 1913 Miner was appointed to the 3rd ward of the International Falls city council to succeed Herman Koeneke, who had previously resigned. Miner would serve on the city council from 1913 until 1915, when he was replaced by J. E. Burdick. In 1914 Miner defeated farmer Henry Packard by a 21-point margin and was elected to the Minnesota House, representing Koochiching County.

That year Minnesota began electing state legislators without regard for partisan labels, and in the state house, Miner became identified with the conservative caucus. In the 1915 legislative session Miner was assigned to the Committees on Drainage, General Legislation, Reapportionment, Roads and Bridges, State Normal Schools, Towns and Counties, Transportation. Throughout his first term, Miner focused on issues which affected northern Minnesota, and in his first major committee meeting of the session, Miner got into an argument with another legislator, George William Dealand over the issue of drainage expenditures, which often took on a sectional character. A month later in February, Miner co-authored a proposal with representative Fred Bessette of Orr to appropriate $112,500 for building firebreaks and improving state lands. Just under a week later, the state legislature faced a major debate over the issue of public lands, which had become almost exclusively confined to northern Minnesota and at 2,000 acres, had become unruly for the management of the state auditor only. On one side stood the state auditor, J. A. O. Preus, who felt it necessary to prevent the lands from falling into the hands of speculators, desiring it be sold to settlers. Miner and International Falls state senator L. H. Nord however felt that development from private companies would be better suited to develop the region and offered their own proposal on the land-sale question. In April, Miner introduced legislation that would extend the right of eminent domain to hydroelectric companies and allow them to settle damages in court at a later date.

Miner would be re-elected without opposition in 1916. In January 1917 Miner was sworn in for his second term. Miner quickly resumed his work, and in February he introduced legislation to amend the state's game laws, proposing that foreign born citizens who had not yet been naturalized be prohibited from hunting in the state. In May, Miner came into conflict with governor Joseph A. A. Burnquist over his veto of appropriations to counties in northern Minnesota for drainage, bounties on wolves, and for a lack of aid to schools.

Despite facing no opponent in 1916, Miner faced a competitive race in 1918. Facing a four-candidate field, Miner earned 35% of the vote. His principal opposition was Koochiching County Attorney Francis J. McPartlin and clothing merchant William Hasselbarth, with landlord Robert Iltis placing last with a meager 5%. As part of the nonpartisan election process, Miner and McPartlin advanced to the general election, where Miner was defeated by a margin of 103 votes, or five points.

== Later career ==
Following his defeat for re-election, Miner returned to newspaper publishing, where he managed and edited the International Falls Press and Border Budget from 1920 until 1927, when the paper was renamed to the International Falls Press. During this time he served as the Postmaster of International Falls, serving in that role from 1922 until 1935. Miner also helped found the Koochiching County Historical Society.

== Personal life ==
Miner married Althea M. Varnum on August 19, 1890, the two had five children together. Miner died on March 1, 1940.
