= Education in Minnesota =

Education in the US State of Minnesota comes from a number of public and private sources and encompasses pre-Kindergarten to post-secondary levels. Minnesota has a literate and well-educated population; the state ranked 13th on the 2006–07 Morgan Quitno Smartest State Award, and is first in the percentage of residents with at least a high school diploma. But while more than 90% of high school seniors graduated in 2006, about 6% of white, 28% of African American, 30% of Asian American and more than 34% of Hispanic and Native American students dropped out of school. In 2007 Minnesota students earned the highest average score in the nation on the ACT exam. While Minnesota has chosen not to implement school vouchers, it is home to the first charter school, the City Academy High School of Saint Paul.

The state supports two public university and college systems, including 37 institutions in the Minnesota State Colleges and Universities System, and five major campuses of the University of Minnesota. It is also home to more than 20 private colleges and universities, six of which rank among the nation's top 100 liberal arts colleges, according to U.S. News & World Report.

== K-12 ==
Public education in Minnesota is administered by School Districts and falls under the umbrella of the Minnesota Department of Education. Most School districts in the state are designated as "independent" and derive their authority from the Minnesota Legislature.

49 Minnesota high schools were ranked by Newsweek in their 2013 list of the best 1000 public high schools in America Edina High School was the top ranked Minnesota school and was 121st in the nation with a 99% graduation rate, 0.9 average AP/IB test score, and 96% college-bound rate.

== Standardized testing proficiency ==
=== All students ===
Year	Proficient in math	% proficient	Proficient in reading	% proficient
2014	258,925	61	249,450	59
2013	256,059	61	242,736	58
2012	259,212	62	315,818	76
2011	234,813	57	309,555	75
2010	266,666	66	303,406	72
2009	256,009	64	300,881	72
2007	248,291	62	297,177	71
2007	240,378	61	288,105	68
2006	244,143	58	289,616	72
2005	171,068	71	182,787	79
2004	171,068	71	182,787	74
2003	87,052	73	89,083	75

=== Federal involvement ===
Minnesota schools adhere to federal guidelines like those outlined in No Child Left Behind.

The United States Congress provides 6% of operating revenue for K-12 education in the state.
