= Joseph L. Prifrel =

American politician (1905–1997)

Joseph L. Prifrel (December 1, 1905 – November 6, 1997) was an American businessman and politician.

Prifrel was born in Moson County, Hungary and emigrated with his parents and family to the United States and settled in Saint Paul, Minnesota, when he was six of seven years old. Prifrel became a naturalized United States citizen on July 28, 1922. Prifrel went to school in Saint Paul, Minnesota. He was involved in the labor union movement, was a furrier, and lived in Saint Paul with his wife and family. Prifrel served in the Minnesota House of Representatives from 1939 to 1972. He died at the White Bear Care Center in White Bear Lake, Minnesota. The funeral and burial was in Saint Paul, Minnesota.
