= John A. Hartle =

American politician (1891–1979)

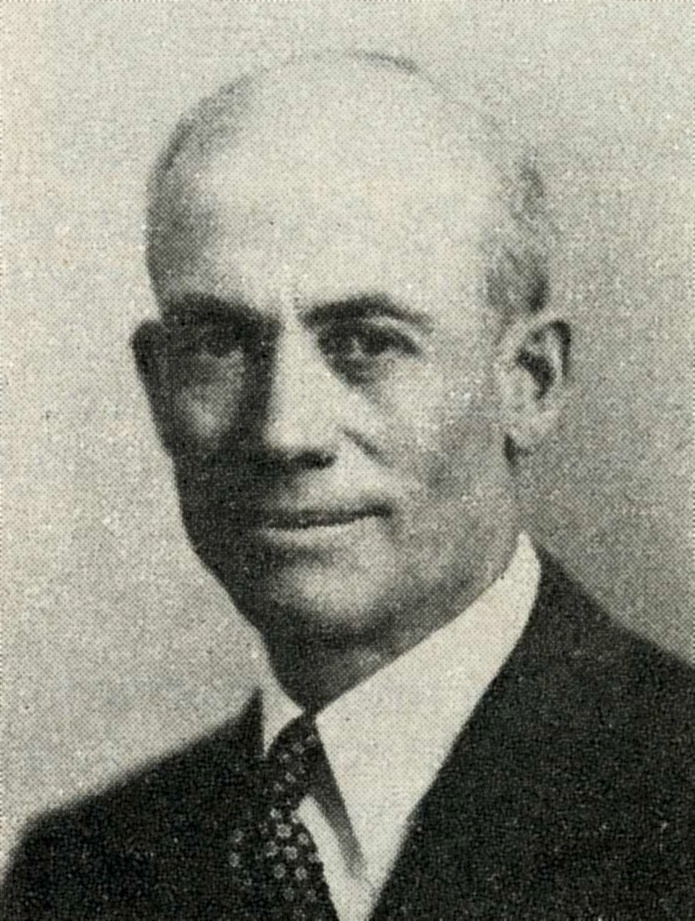

41st Speaker of the Minnesota House of Representatives
- In office January 4, 1949 – January 6, 1955
- Preceded by: Lawrence M. Hall
- Succeeded by: Alfred I. Johnson

Minority Leader of the Minnesota House of Representatives
- In office January 6, 1955 – January 8, 1957
- Preceded by: Fred A. Cina
- Succeeded by: Odin Langen

Minnesota State Representative
- In office January 8, 1935 – January 6, 1969

Personal details
- Born: August 6, 1891 Havana Township, Minnesota, U.S.
- Died: April 5, 1979 (aged 87) Owatonna, Minnesota, U.S.
- Party: Nonpartisan Conservative Caucus; Republican
- Spouse: Ruth
- Children: Austin and Dorothy
- Profession: Farmer
- Some records show a birth date of 1892

John A. Hartle (August 6, 1891 – April 5, 1979) was a Minnesota Republican politician and a Speaker of the Minnesota House of Representatives. Born on a farm, he became a livestock farmer himself. He was elected to the Minnesota House of Representatives in 1934. As a Republican, he caucused with the Conservative Caucus in the then-nonpartisan body.

Hartle served as chair of the Markets and Marketing and Civil Administration committees, and in 1949 he was elected to replace outgoing speaker Lawrence M. Hall. Hartle served as speaker for three terms, until the Liberal Caucus gained a majority in 1955. Hartle served one term as Minority Leader, and when the conservatives regained control of the body in 1963, he became chair, first of the education committee, and then the taxes committee. He retired from the legislature after the 1968 elections. His nephew Dean Hartle also served in the Minnesota Legislature.

Political offices
Preceded by Lawrence M. Hall	Speaker of the Minnesota House of Representatives; 1949–1955	Succeeded by Alfred I. Johnson
Preceded by Fred A. Cina	Minority Leader of the Minnesota House of Representatives; 1955–1957	Succeeded by Odin Langen
