= Edmond Conn =

American politician

Edmond Farrell Conn
- Born: March 18, 1914; Alden, Minnesota, United States
- Died: December 24, 1998 (aged 84)
- Occupations: Farmer, businessman, politician
- Known for: Serving in the Minnesota House of Representatives
- Political party: Democratic

Edmond Farrell Conn (March 18, 1914 – December 24, 1998) was an American farmer, businessman, and politician.

Conn was born in Alden, Freeborn County, Minnesota. Conn was a farmer and a businessman. He lived in Alden, Minnesota. Conn was involved with the insurance, farm loans, livestock, and real estate businesses. Conn also served on the local school board. He served in the Minnesota House of Representatives from 1957 to 1962 and was a Democrat.
