= Lawrence M. Hall =

American politician

Lawrence M. Hall, Sr.
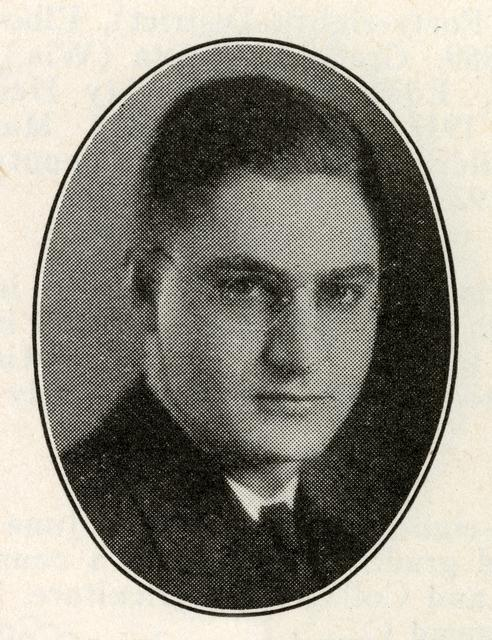
- Hall in 1935

40th Speaker of the Minnesota House of Representatives
- In office January 1939 – January 4, 1949
- Preceded by: Harold H. Barker
- Succeeded by: John A. Hartle

Minnesota State Representative from the 15th District
- In office January 1935 – January 1949

Personal details
- Born: May 20, 1908 St. Cloud, Minnesota, U.S.
- Died: February 28, 1973 (aged 64)
- Party: Nonpartisan Conservative Caucus; Democratic
- Spouse: Margaret Sullivan
- Children: Lawrence Jr., Judith, Virginia, and Debbie
- Education: St. John's University; Georgetown Law School
- Profession: Lawyer

Lawrence M. Hall, Sr. (May 20, 1908 in St. Cloud, Minnesota – February 28, 1973) was a Minnesota Democratic politician and is the longest-serving Speaker of the Minnesota House of Representatives. He was elected to the Minnesota House of Representatives in 1934, and was affiliated with the Democrats, although the legislature was at the time a nonpartisan body. In 1939, he joined with the Conservative Caucus, and was elected to serve as speaker, a position he held for ten years.

Hall left the legislature in 1949. He worked as a lobbyist, before joining the Metropolitan Airports Commission in 1953. He would remain with the body until August 1972, eventually becoming chair of the organization.

Political offices
Preceded by Harold H. Barker	Speaker of the Minnesota House of Representatives; 1939–1949	Succeeded by John A. Hartle
