= Harvey Edwin Swennes =

American businessman and politician

Harvey Edwin Swennes (November 18, 1899 – July 25, 1964) was an American business, politician, newspaper editor and publisher.

Swennes was born in Heron Lake, Jackson County, Minnesota. He lived in Lamberton, Redwood County, Minnesota with his wife and family. Swennes published the Heron Lake News and the Lamberton News. Swennes served in the Minnesota House of Representatives in 1939 and 1940. He had worked for the Post Publishing Company, in Robbinsdale, Minnesota for the last two years. Swennes died at his home in Edina, Minnesota.
