= Barbara Burtness =

American internist and oncologist

Barbara Ann Burtness

Academic background
- Education: AB, 1982, Bryn Mawr College; MD, 1986, Stony Brook University

Barbara Ann Burtness is an American internist and oncologist. She is Anthony N. Brady Professor of Medicine at Yale University and Chief Translational Research Officer at Yale Cancer Center. She is founding Director of the Yale Head and Neck Specialized Program of Research Excellence and previously co-directed the Stand Up to Cancer Fanconi Anemia Research Fund-Farrah Fawcett Foundation Head and Neck Cancer Research Team. She chairs the ECOG-ACRIN Head and Neck Therapeutics Committee and the ECOG-ACRIN Task Force on Career Advancement.

== Early life and education ==
Burtness completed her Bachelor of Arts degree at Bryn Mawr College in 1982 before enrolling at Stony Brook University for her medical degree. Upon graduating in 1986, she finished her internship and residency at Yale New Haven Hospital and her fellowship at the Memorial Sloan Kettering Cancer Center.

== Career ==
After completing her fellowship in 1993, Burtness became a cancer researcher at Yale University. In this role, she became a member of the Eastern Cooperative Oncology Group, a consortium of researchers who test new treatments in clinical trials. Burtness remained at Yale until 2005. At Fox Chase Cancer Center she served as the Chief of head and neck oncology, Vice-Chair of Medical Oncology and Associate Director for Clinical Research. During her tenure at the institution, Burtness was named one of the Best Women’s Physicians for 2011 and listed as one of the Best Doctors in America in 2013.

Burtness left the Fox Chase Cancer Center in 2014 to return to Yale University as a Professor of Medicine and serves as Chief of the Division of Head and Neck/Sarcoma Oncology. She was again named to the Best Doctors List. During this time, she also served on various committees and councils including the Executive Committee on the Status of Women in Medicine, Faculty Advisory Council, and the Dean’s Climate Working Group. In 2020, Burtness received the YCC Clinical Science Research Award in recognition of her study "Pembrolizumab alone or with chemotherapy versus cetuximab with chemotherapy for recurrent or metastatic squamous cell carcinoma of the head and neck (KEYNOTE-048): a randomized, open-label, phase 3 study." She serves as the co-leader of the Developmental Therapeutics Research Program at Yale Cancer Center; she is Director of the Yale Head and Neck Specialized Program in Research Excellence, awarded by the National Institutes of Health in 2020.

In 2021, she was appointed Interim Associate Director for Diversity, Equity, and Inclusion at the Yale Cancer Center. Burtness co-led the multi-institutional Stand Up to Cancer Fanconi Anemia Research Fund-Farrah Fawcett Foundation Head and Neck Cancer Research Team. In December 2022, she was appointed Chief Translational Research Officer and Associate Director for Translational Research at Yale Cancer Center.
