= Edwin J. Chilgren =

American politician

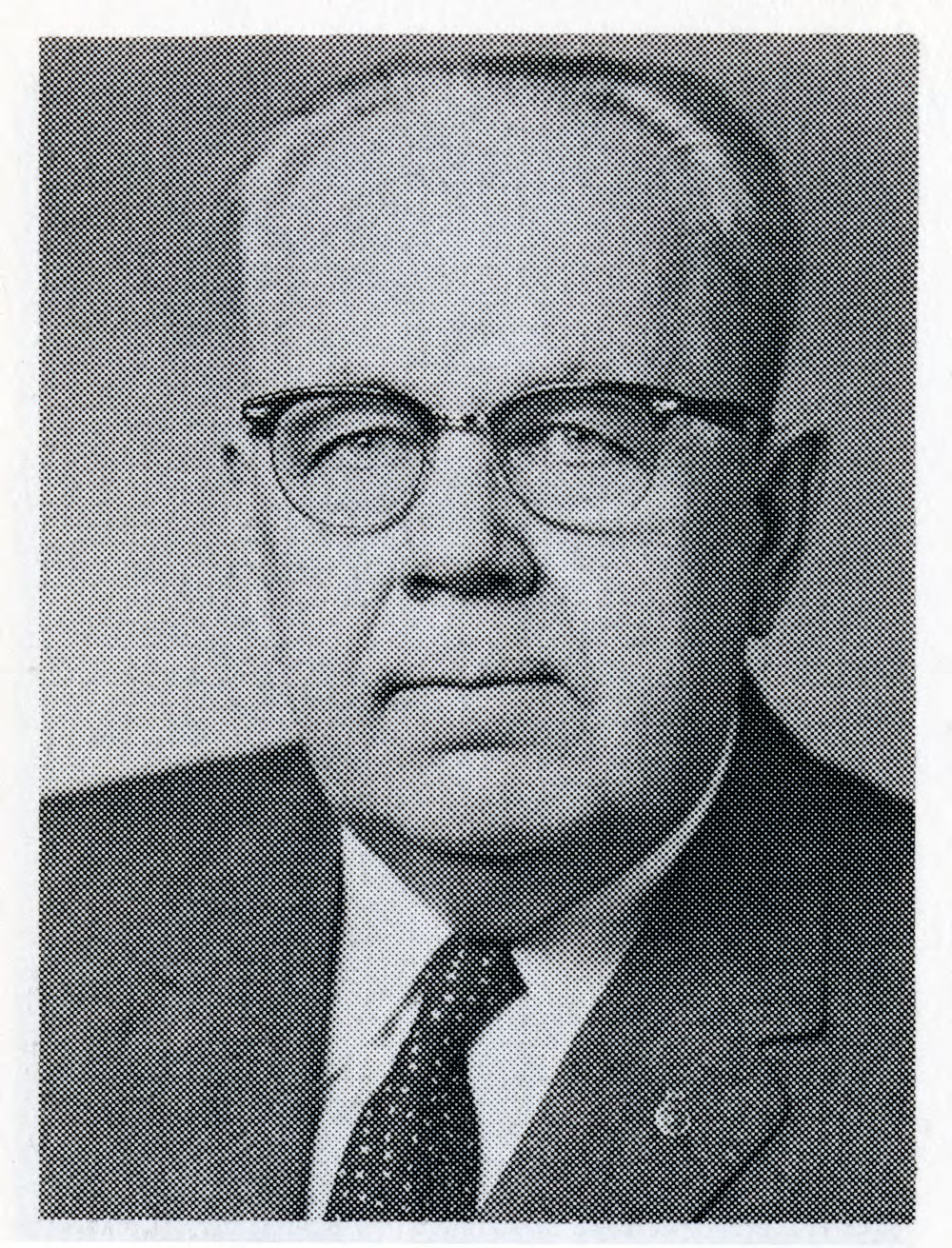
- Chilgren in 1963

43rd Speaker of the Minnesota House of Representatives
- In office January 5, 1959 – January 7, 1963
- Preceded by: Alfred I. Johnson
- Succeeded by: Lloyd L. Duxbury

Member of the Minnesota House of Representatives from the Koochiching County (Note: Numbered as the 62nd district until 1963, later renumbered as the 64th district from 1963–1965) district
- In office January 4, 1927 – January 4, 1965
- Preceded by: David Hurlburt
- Succeeded by: Irv Anderson

Personal details
- Born: July 4, 1897 Jämtland, Sweden
- Died: August 31, 1972 (aged 75)
- Other political affiliations: Nonpartisan Liberal Caucus
- Spouse: Fronice Williams
- Children: 2
- Profession: Publisher

Edwin J. Chilgren (July 4, 1897 – August 31, 1972) was an American newspaper publisher. He served as a member of the Minnesota House of Representatives (1927- 1965) and was Speaker of the Minnesota House of Representatives (1959– 1963).

Chilgren was born in Jämtland, Sweden. He was the son of John Frederick Chilgren (1872–1950) and Brita Kristina (Sjolund) Chilgren (1876–1918). After emigrating from Sweden at the age of seven, he was raised in Blackduck, Minnesota. Chilgren served with the United States Marines during World War I. He was the owner of the Littlefork (MN) Times in Koochiching County which he bought in 1921. He published this newspaper for 43 years, selling it when he retired in 1964.

He was elected to the Minnesota House of Representatives in 1926, where he caucused with the Liberal Caucus in the then-nonpartisan body. He became chair of the Taxes Committee in 1955, and in 1959 he was elected speaker, a position he held until conservatives took control of the House in 1963. Chilgren retired from the legislature after the 1964 elections.

== Personal life ==
In 1920, he married Flonice Lorene (Williams) Chilgren (1902–1969). They were the parents of two daughters. He died in 1972. Both he and his wife were buried in Oakley Cemetery in Littlefork, Minnesota.

== Notes ==
Political offices
| Preceded by Alfred I. Johnson | Speaker of the Minnesota House of Representatives; 1959–1963 | Succeeded by Lloyd L. Duxbury |
