= Charles Robert Hansen =

American politician

Charles Robert Hansen (Baldy, C.R.) (August 8, 1909 – May 22, 2000) was an American politician and businessman.

Hansen was born in Saint Paul, Minnesota. He moved to Austin, Minnesota in the 1940s and was involved with the lumbering and banking businesses. Hansen went to the University of Minnesota and Austin Community College (now Riverland Community College) to study mechanical engineering. Hansen served on the Austin, Minnesota City Council. Hansen then served as mayor of Austin, Minnesota from 1954 to 1962 and was a Democrat. Hansen served in the Minnesota Senate from 1967 to 1976. He died at Austin Medical Center in Austin, Minnesota.
