= Bryan Lawrence (politician) =

American politician (born 1970)

Member of the Minnesota House of Representatives from the 27B district
- Incumbent
- Assumed office April 2, 2024
- Preceded by: Kurt Daudt

Personal details
- Born: June 28, 1970 (age 56) Coon Rapids, Minnesota, U.S.
- Party: Republican
- Spouse: Marytina (m. 1995)
- Children: 4
- Education: University of Minnesota (BA)
- Occupation: Farmer

Bryan Lawrence (born June 28, 1970) is an American politician and farmer who has represented district 27B in the Minnesota House of Representatives since 2024. He is a member of the Republican Party. His district is in the northern Twin Cities suburbs, including parts of Anoka, Isanti, Mille Lacs, and Sherburne Counties.

== Early life and education ==
Lawrence was born on June 28, 1970, in Coon Rapids, Minnesota. His father, Doug, was an entrepreneur who owned and operated a number of local soil and sod businesses. He graduated from Coon Rapids High School in 1988 and attended the University of Minnesota, where he earned his bachelor's degree in agricultural business administration. Lawrence returned to join his father's business along with his younger brother, Brad.

== Political career ==
Lawrence first entered politics when he ran for state house district 17B in 1996 and 1998, losing to DFL incumbent Leslie Schumacher both times. He was then appointed to the Baldwin Township board, where he served for over 20 years. Lawrence also chaired the Sherburne County planning and zoning board.

=== Minnesota House of Representatives ===
After former speaker of the state house Kurt Daudt resigned, a special election to fill the vacancy was held on March 19, 2024. Lawrence won the election with over 80% of the vote. He was endorsed by the Republican Party of Minnesota at its February nominating convention.

Lawrence was sworn into office on April 2, 2024, and was assigned to the Children and Families Finance and Policy Committee and the Education Finance Committee.

== Personal life ==
Lawrence resides on the family farm in Princeton, Minnesota, along with his wife Marytina and their four children. They are members of the New Life Church, an affiliate of the Assemblies of God USA.

Minnesota House of Representatives
Preceded by Kurt Daudt	Member of the Minnesota House of Representatives from District 27B; 2024–present	Incumbent
