= William R. Schreiber =

American politician

Minnesota House of Representatives
- In office 1973–1976
- In office 1979–1982
- In office 1983–1992

Personal details
- Born: November 13, 1941 (age 84) Minneapolis, Minnesota, U.S.
- Party: Republican
- Spouse: Lona Minne
- Profession: Politician

William R. Schreiber (born November 11, 1941) was a Minnesota politician and a member of the Minnesota House of Representatives. Schreiber was born in Minneapolis, Minnesota. His wife Lona Minne also served in the Minnesota Legislature.
