= Peter X. Fugina =

American politician

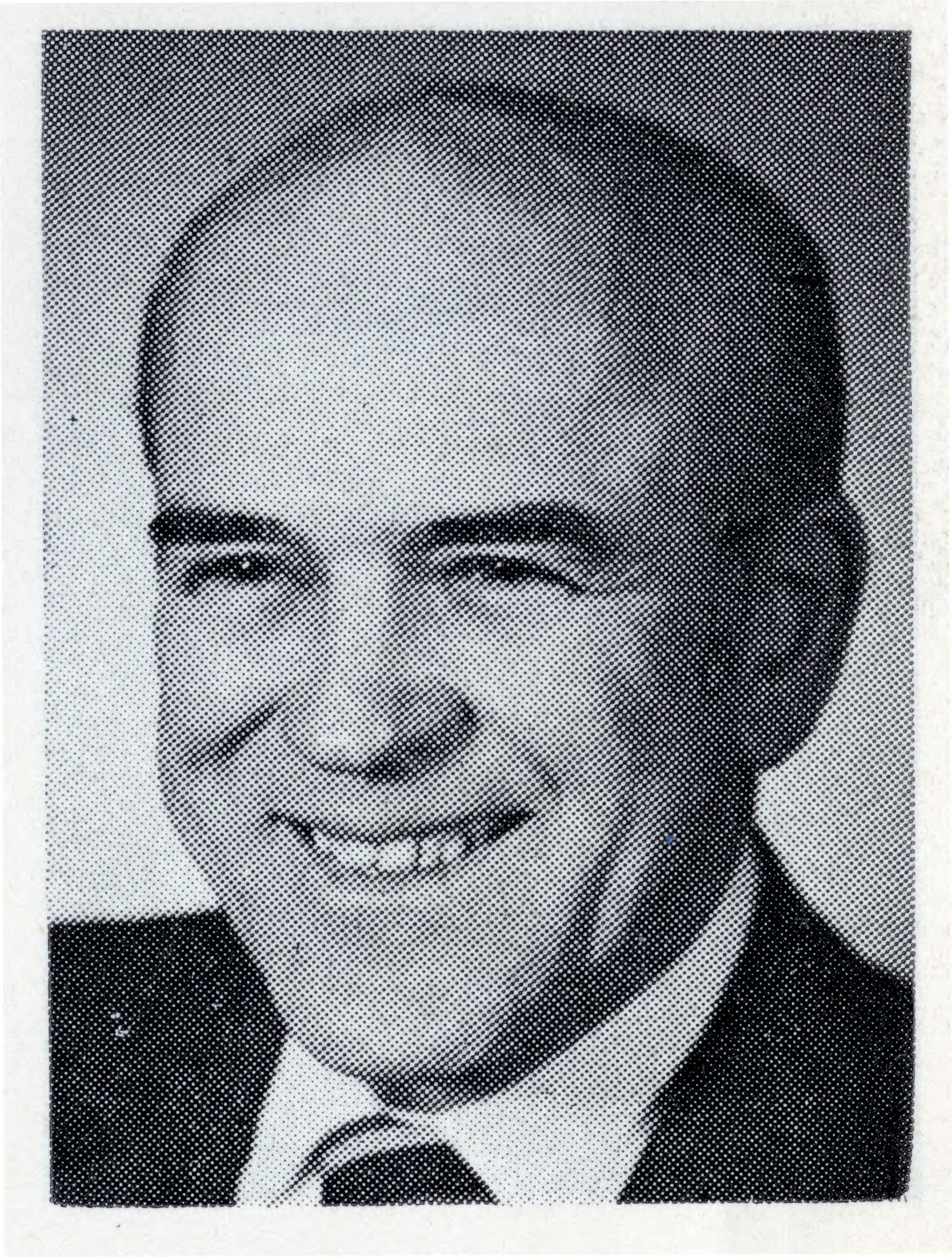
- Fugina c. 1973

Member of the Minnesota House of Representatives from the 62nd and 05A Districts
- In office January 4, 1971 – December 31, 1978
- Governor: Wendell R. Anderson; Rudy Perpich

Member of the Minnesota House of Representatives from the 61st and 62nd Districts
- In office January 7, 1957 – January 1, 1967
- Governor: Orville Freeman; Elmer L. Andersen; Karl Rolvaag

Personal details
- Born: August 28, 1909 Biwabik, Minnesota, U.S.
- Died: March 28, 1994 (aged 84) Stillwater, Minnesota, U.S.
- Resting place: Fort Snelling National Cemetery
- Other political affiliations: Democrat (DFL)
- Education: Princeton University; Hamline University; University of Minnesota; Purdue University; Stanford University; University of Washington

Military service
- Allegiance: United States
- Branch/service: United States Navy
- Rank: Lieutenant Commander
- Battles/wars: World War II; Pacific War; Occupation of Japan

Peter Xavier Fugina (August 28, 1908 – March 28, 1994) was an American politician and educator.

Fugina was born in Biwabik, Minnesota, and graduated from Aurora High School in Aurora, Minnesota. He was in the United States Navy during World War II. He received his degree in chemistry from Hamline University. Fugina also went to Princeton University, Purdue University, the University of Minnesota, Stanford University, and the University of Washington. He lived in Virginia, Minnesota, with his wife and family, and taught chemistry at the Ely Community College and in the St. Louis County School system. Fugina was in the Minnesota House of Representatives from 1955 to 1962 and from 1971 to 1978. He was a Democrat. Fugina died from pneumonia and Parkinson's disease at Lakeview Memorial Hospital in Stillwater, Minnesota. He was buried at Fort Snelling National Cemetery.
