= Kurt Daudt =

American politician (born 1973)

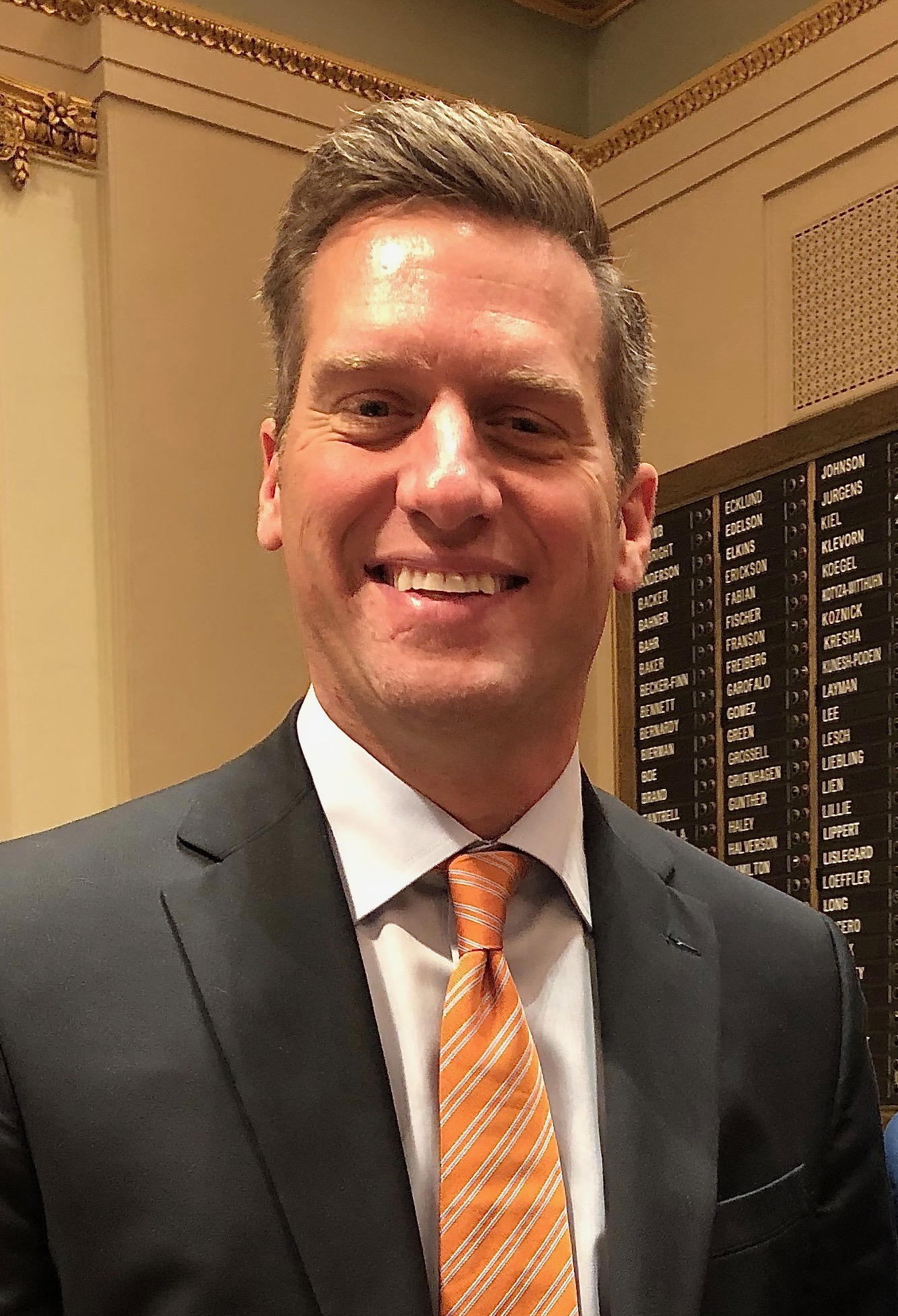
- Daudt in 2019

60th Speaker of the Minnesota House of Representatives
- In office January 6, 2015 – January 7, 2019
- Preceded by: Paul Thissen
- Succeeded by: Melissa Hortman

Minority Leader of the Minnesota House of Representatives
- In office January 8, 2019 – January 3, 2023
- Preceded by: Melissa Hortman
- Succeeded by: Lisa Demuth
- In office January 8, 2013 – January 6, 2015
- Preceded by: Paul Thissen
- Succeeded by: Paul Thissen

Member of the Minnesota House of Representatives
- In office January 4, 2011 – February 11, 2024
- Preceded by: Rob Eastlund
- Succeeded by: Bryan Lawrence
- Constituency: District 27B (2023–2024); District 31A (2013–2023); District 17A (2011–2013)

Personal details
- Born: Kurt Louis Daudt; September 26, 1973 (age 52) Springfield, Minnesota, U.S.
- Party: Republican
- Education: University of North Dakota

Kurt Louis Daudt (born September 26, 1973) is an American politician and former Minority Leader of the Minnesota House of Representatives. He is also a former Speaker of the Minnesota House of Representatives. A member of the Republican Party of Minnesota, he represented District 27B, which included portions of Anoka, Isanti, and Sherburne counties in east-central Minnesota, north of the Twin Cities metropolitan area. He lives on his family farm in Crown, Minnesota.

== Early life, education, and career ==
Daudt attended Princeton High School, where he graduated in 1992. Rep. Sondra Erickson was his English teacher there. Daudt attended the University of North Dakota to study aviation management but did not graduate. He is a licensed private pilot.

Daudt served as an Isanti County commissioner from 2005 to 2010. Before that, he was a township board supervisor for Stanford Township from 1995 to 2005, and a member of the East Central Regional Library Board. He was also a founding member of Project 24, a nonprofit organization that builds orphanages in Kenya. To date, the project has raised over $500,000 and built six orphanages. Before his election to the legislature, he worked at auto dealerships as a salesman and business manager.

== Minnesota House of Representatives ==
=== Tenure ===
Daudt was first elected in 2010. After Republicans won a House majority in the 2014 midterm elections, Daudt was selected by Republicans to become Speaker of the Minnesota House of Representatives for the session beginning in 2015. Daudt was elected as Speaker of the Minnesota House of Representatives by the full House on January 6, 2015. Daudt is the youngest person to serve as Speaker since the 1930s. He resigned from the Minnesota House on February 11, 2024.

=== Committee assignments ===
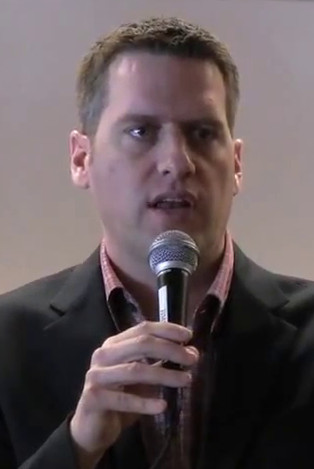
Daudt in 2013

Daudt served on the Elections Committee and the Rules and Legislative Administration Committee for the 2013-2015 Session. He previously served on the Commerce and Regulatory Reform, the Higher Education Policy and Finance, and the Redistricting committees, as well as on the Taxes Subcommittee for the Property and Local Tax Division.

=== Accomplishments ===
In his first term, Daudt proposed major reforms to Minnesota's welfare system including crackdowns on out-of-state use of EBT cards, limits on monthly cash benefit withdrawals, and eligibility disqualifications for individuals who purchase alcohol or tobacco using an EBT card. The tobacco and alcohol provisions were signed into law as part of the 2011 Special Session Health and Human Services bill, and restrictions limiting EBT use to states surrounding Minnesota were passed and signed into law in 2012.

In 2016 under Speaker Daudt, the legislature approved a bill that made Minnesota one of at least 12 other states to fully exempt military retirement benefits from state taxes. In 2017, Daudt and the Republican-led Minnesota Senate successfully negotiated the largest tax cut in two decades, including a $750 million cut over ten years for social security recipients, a $500 tax credit for student loan payments, tax cuts for tobacco products, and property tax relief for agriculture land. Former Minnesota Governor Mark Dayton took the unprecedented step of attempting to veto funding for the Minnesota legislature in an attempt to reverse tax cuts passed by the legislature, but none of the tax reductions were ultimately revisited.

=== Political Positions ===
In December 2021, Daudt, as House Minority Leader, signed a letter along with 37 other Republicans in opposition of the Mayo Clinic for its vaccine mandate policy for employees, calling for a halt in state funding for health care facilities that fire employees "due to unrealistic vaccine mandate policies".

=== Controversies ===
In 2013, Daudt, then the House minority leader, was involved in an incident in Montana when a friend Daniel Weinzetl, brandished a handgun during the sale of a vintage vehicle, pointing it at the seller's "entire family, including the children." The handgun belonged to Daudt. The altercation arose after Daudt and the seller differed about the condition of the vehicle. Daudt was later released by Montana police without being charged with a crime.

In 2015, U.S. Bank and Capital One won legal judgments against Daudt, stemming from his failure to pay approximately $13,000 in overdue charges and legal fees incurred pursuing the money. However, the companies declined to pursue the judgments after the debts were paid in full.

== Personal life ==
Daudt is a member of the Lutheran Church–Missouri Synod. He is unmarried.

== Elections ==
2020 Minnesota State Representative- House 31A
Party	Candidate	Votes	%	±%
Republican	Kurt Daudt (Incumbent)	17960	72.84	
Democratic (DFL)	Brad Brown	6664	27.03	

2018 Minnesota State Representative- House 31A
Party	Candidate	Votes	%	±%
Republican	Kurt Daudt (Incumbent)	12326	69.08	
Democratic (DFL)	Brad Brown	5501	30.83	

2016 Minnesota State Representative- House 31A
Party	Candidate	Votes	%	±%
Republican	Kurt Daudt (Incumbent)	14815	70.33	
Democratic (DFL)	Sarah Udvig	6208	29.47	

2014 Minnesota State Representative- House 31A
Party	Candidate	Votes	%	±%
Republican	Kurt Daudt (Incumbent)	10,363	96.67	

2012 Minnesota State Representative- House 31A
Party	Candidate	Votes	%	±%
Republican	Kurt Daudt (Incumbent)	11,990	60.42	
Democratic (DFL)	Ryan Fiereck	7,823	39.42	

2010 Minnesota State Representative- House 17A
Party	Candidate	Votes	%	±%
Republican	Kurt Daudt	9,840	56.04	
Democratic (DFL)	Jim Godfrey	7,044	40.11	
Constitution	Paul Bergley	657	3.74	

Minnesota House of Representatives
Preceded by Rob Eastlund	Member of the Minnesota House of Representatives from District 27B; 31A (2013–2023); 17A (2011–2013); 2011–2024	Succeeded by Bryan Lawrence
Preceded by Paul Thissen	Minority Leader of the Minnesota House of Representatives; 2013–2015	Succeeded by Paul Thissen
Preceded by Melissa Hortman	Minority Leader of the Minnesota House of Representatives; 2019–2023	Succeeded by Lisa Demuth
Political offices
Preceded by Paul Thissen	Speaker of the Minnesota House of Representatives; 2015–2019	Succeeded by Melissa Hortman
