= Carl S. Burtness =

American politician

Carl S. Burtness (April 30, 1882 – April 22, 1954) was an American businessman and politician.

Burtness was born in Wilmington Township, Houston County, Minnesota. He went to Breckinridge Institute in Decorah, Iowa and to the University of Minnesota Farm School. Burtness lived in Caledonia, Minnesota with his wife and family. He was a farmer and was involved with the insurance business. Burtness served as the Wilmington Township Clerk for 21 years. He also served in the Minnesota House of Representatives from 1943 to 1950. He died at Lutheran Hospital in La Crosse, Wisconsin.
