= Stanley W. Holmquist =

American politician

Stanley Willard Holmquist

4th Minnesota Senate Majority Leader
- In office January 1967 – January 1973
- Preceded by: John M. Zwach
- Succeeded by: Nick Coleman

Minnesota State Senator
- In office 1955–1973

Minnesota State Representative
- In office 1947–1955

Personal details
- Born: August 23, 1909 Hallock, Minnesota, U.S.
- Died: May 15, 2003 (aged 93) Bloomington, Minnesota, U.S.
- Party: Nonpartisan, Conservative Caucus; Republican
- Spouse: Edith Maria Johnson
- Children: 3
- Education: University of Minnesota
- Occupation: Retail Lumber Dealer; School Superintendent

Stanley W. Holmquist (August 23, 1909 – May 15, 2003) was an American businessman and educator. He served in the Minnesota House of Representatives and was a former Minnesota Senate Majority Leader.

== Background ==
Holmquist was born in Hallock, Minnesota. He was the son of Minnesota State Representative, Victor Holmquist. He attended Minnehaha Academy High School and the Augustana Lutheran Synod Minnesota College. He graduated from the University of Minnesota; B.S.; (1936) and M.A.; Educational Administration, (1940). He worked as a lumber dealer and in 1942, he started a family owned lumber business. Holmquist later served as Superintendent and Principal of Grove City schools.

== Career ==
He was first elected to the Minnesota House of Representatives in 1946, and later was elected to the Minnesota Senate in 1954. Holmquist served as the majority leader of the Conservative Caucus in the nonpartisan senate from 1967 until his retirement in 1973.

== Personal life ==
In 1938, he married Edith Maria Johnson, who was the sister of Eleanor Anne Johnson, wife of future Minnesota Governor, Elmer Lee Andersen.
