= 1946 Saint Paul teachers' strike =

1946 labor dispute in Saint Paul, Minnesota, United States

The 1946 Saint Paul teachers' strike was a strike by public school teachers in Saint Paul, Minnesota in late 1946. The strike began on November 25, and 1165 teachers took part until its end on December 27. The strike is considered one of the first teachers' strikes in American history. Elmer L. Andersen described the strike as being "absolutely unheard of," saying that "it is inconceivable to people today what a shock it was then to have teachers go out on strike." Teachers in Saint Paul did not go on strike again until 2020.
