= Frederick A. Cina =

American politician (1908–1984)

Member of the Minnesota House of Representatives from the 62nd district
- In office January 7, 1963 – January 5, 1969

Minnesota House Majority Leader
- In office 1955–1963
- Preceded by: Roy E. Dunn
- Succeeded by: Aubrey W. Dirlam

Member of the Minnesota House of Representatives from the 61st district
- In office January 6, 1947 – January 6, 1963

Personal details
- Born: Frederick Anthony Cina; February 19, 1908 Aurora, Minnesota, U.S.
- Died: October 31, 1984 (aged 76) Aurora, Minnesota, U.S.
- Resting place: Forest Hill Cemetery, Aurora, Minnesota, U.S.
- Spouse: Ruth Bloomquist (m. 1940)
- Children: 3
- Education: University of Minnesota
- Occupation: Politician, attorney

Military service
- Allegiance: United States
- Branch/service: United States Navy
- Battles/wars: World War II

Frederick Anthony Cina (February 19, 1908 – October 31, 1984) was an American lawyer and politician.

Cina was born in Aurora, St. Louis County, Minnesota. He graduated from Aurora High School in Aurora, Minnesota and received his law degree from University of Minnesota Law School in 1930. Cina served in the United States Navy during World War II. He lived in Aurora, Minnesota with his wife and family and practiced law in Aurora and Virginia, Minnesota. In 1942, Cina ran for election to the Minnesota Senate and lost the election. Cina served in the Minnesota House of Representatives from 1947 to 1968 and was a DLFer. Cina served on the University of Minnesota Board of Regents from 1969 to 1975. He died at White Community Hospital in Aurora, Minnesota.

== Notes ==
Political offices
Preceded by Roy E. Dunn	Minnesota House Majority Leader; 1955-1963	Succeeded by Aubrey W. Dirlam
