= 2018 Minnesota State Auditor election =

- November 6, 2018
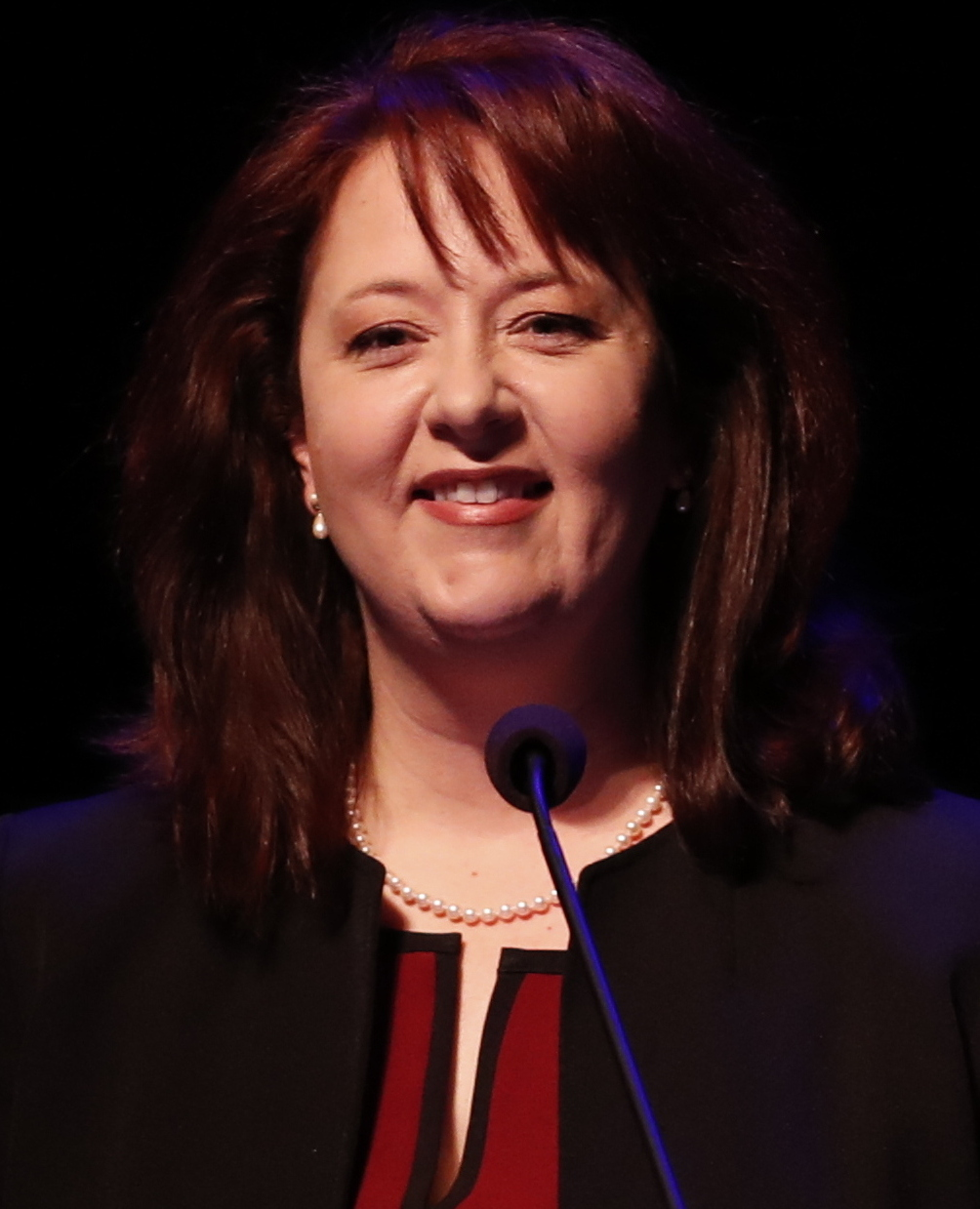

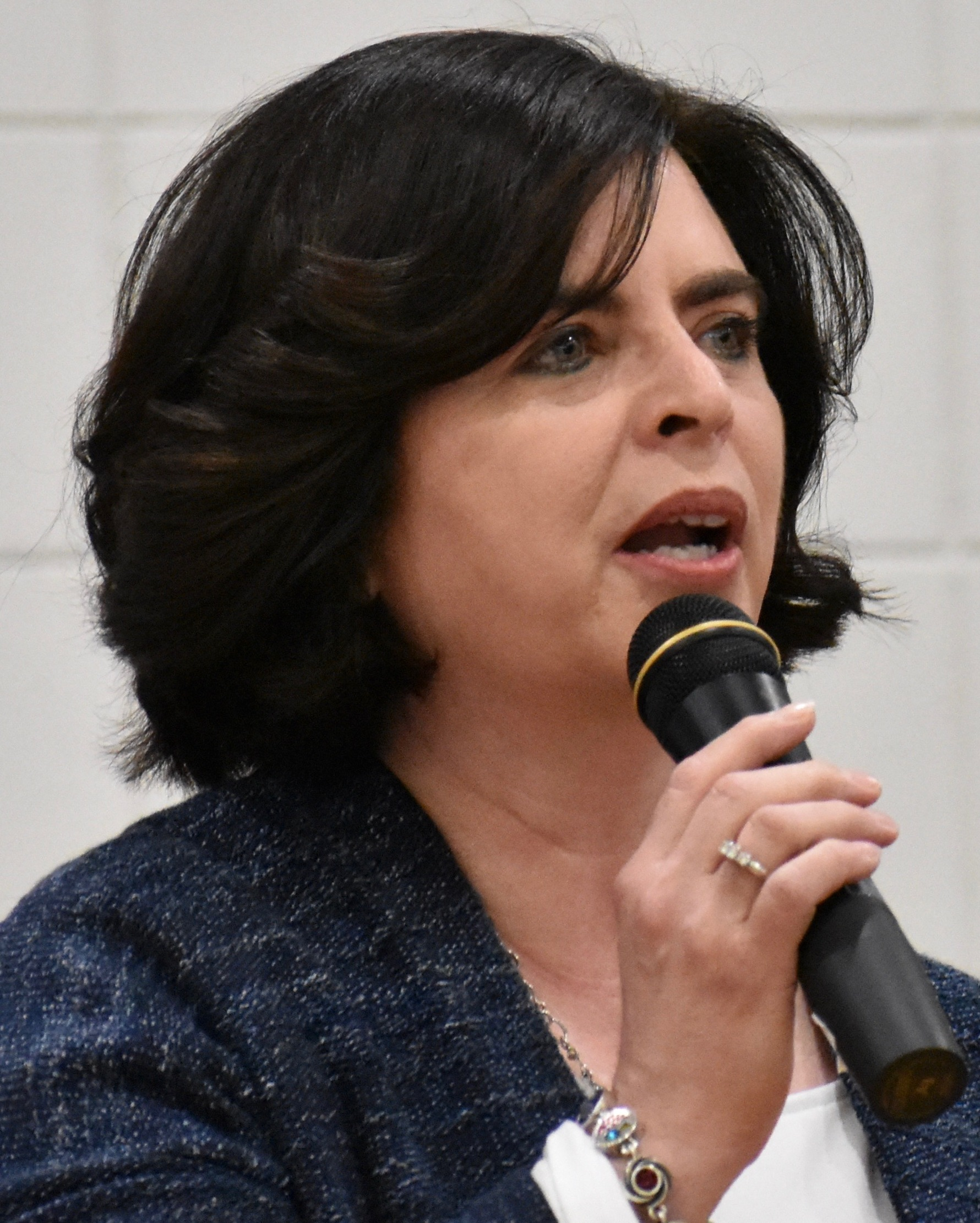

Nominee	Julie Blaha	Pam Myhra	Michael Ford
Party	Democratic (DFL)	Republican	Legal Marijuana Now
Popular vote	1,250,524	1,095,310	133,913
Percentage	49.35%	43.23%	5.28%
- Blaha: 40–50% 50–60% 60–70% 70–80% 80–90% >90% Myhra: 40–50% 50–60% 60–70% 70–80% 80–90% >90%
State Auditor before election
Rebecca Otto
Democratic (DFL)
Elected State Auditor
Julie Blaha
Democratic (DFL)

The 2018 Minnesota State Auditor election was held on November 6, 2018, to elect the state auditor of the U.S. state of Minnesota. Julie Blaha, the Minnesota Democratic–Farmer–Labor Party (DFL) endorsed candidate, won the election.

== Background ==
DFL incumbent Rebecca Otto was first elected in 2006, defeating one-term Republican incumbent Pat Anderson. Otto was re-elected in 2010 and 2014. On January 9, 2017, Otto announced she would seek election to be governor and would not seek re-election to be state auditor.

== Candidates ==
=== Republican Party of Minnesota ===
- Pam Myhra, Certified Public Accountant, member of the Minnesota House of Representatives from 2011 to 2015; candidate for the Republican nomination for Minnesota's 2nd congressional district in 2016; candidate for the Republican nomination for lieutenant governor as Marty Seifert's running mate in 2014

Myhra was unanimously endorsed by the Republicans on June 2, 2018, at their state convention.

=== Minnesota Democratic–Farmer–Labor Party ===
- Julie Blaha, secretary-treasurer of the Minnesota AFL–CIO; former president of Anoka-Hennepin Education Minnesota; former middle school math teacher

Blaha was endorsed by the DFL over Jon Tollefson on June 3, 2018, at their state convention. Tollefson filed for office, but later withdrew.

==== Withdrawn ====
- Jack Dickinson, small business owner
  - Withdrew on February 6, 2018, and endorsed Jon Tollefson.
- Jon Tollefson, lobbyist for the Minnesota Nurses Association; candidate for the DFL nomination for Minnesota's 3rd congressional district in 2016; candidate for the DFL nomination for District 44B in the Minnesota House of Representatives in 2014
  - Withdrew on June 7, 2018.

=== Minor parties and independents ===
- Chris Dock, Libertarian Party of Minnesota
- Michael Ford, Legal Marijuana Now Party

== Results ==
Minnesota State Auditor election, 2018
Party	Candidate	Votes	%	±%
Democratic (DFL)	Julie Blaha	1,250,524	49.35%	−2.16%
Republican	Pam Myhra	1,095,310	43.23%	+3.25%
Legal Marijuana Now	Michael Ford	133,913	5.28%	N/A
Libertarian	Chris Dock	53,068	2.09%	+0.51%
Write-in		1,125	0.04%	0.00%
Total votes		2,533,940	100.0%	N/A
Democratic (DFL) hold				

=== By congressional district ===
Blaha won four of eight congressional districts, with the remaining four going to Myhra, including one that elected a Democrat.

District	Blaha	Myhra	Representative
1st	43%	50%	Jim Hagedorn
2nd	47%	45%	Angie Craig
3rd	50%	44%	Dean Phillips
4th	61%	31%	Betty McCollum
5th	73%	19%	Ilhan Omar
6th	37%	55%	Tom Emmer
7th	37%	57%	Collin Peterson
8th	44%	49%	Pete Stauber

== See also ==
- Minnesota elections, 2018
