= Tom Rukavina =

American politician (1950–2019)

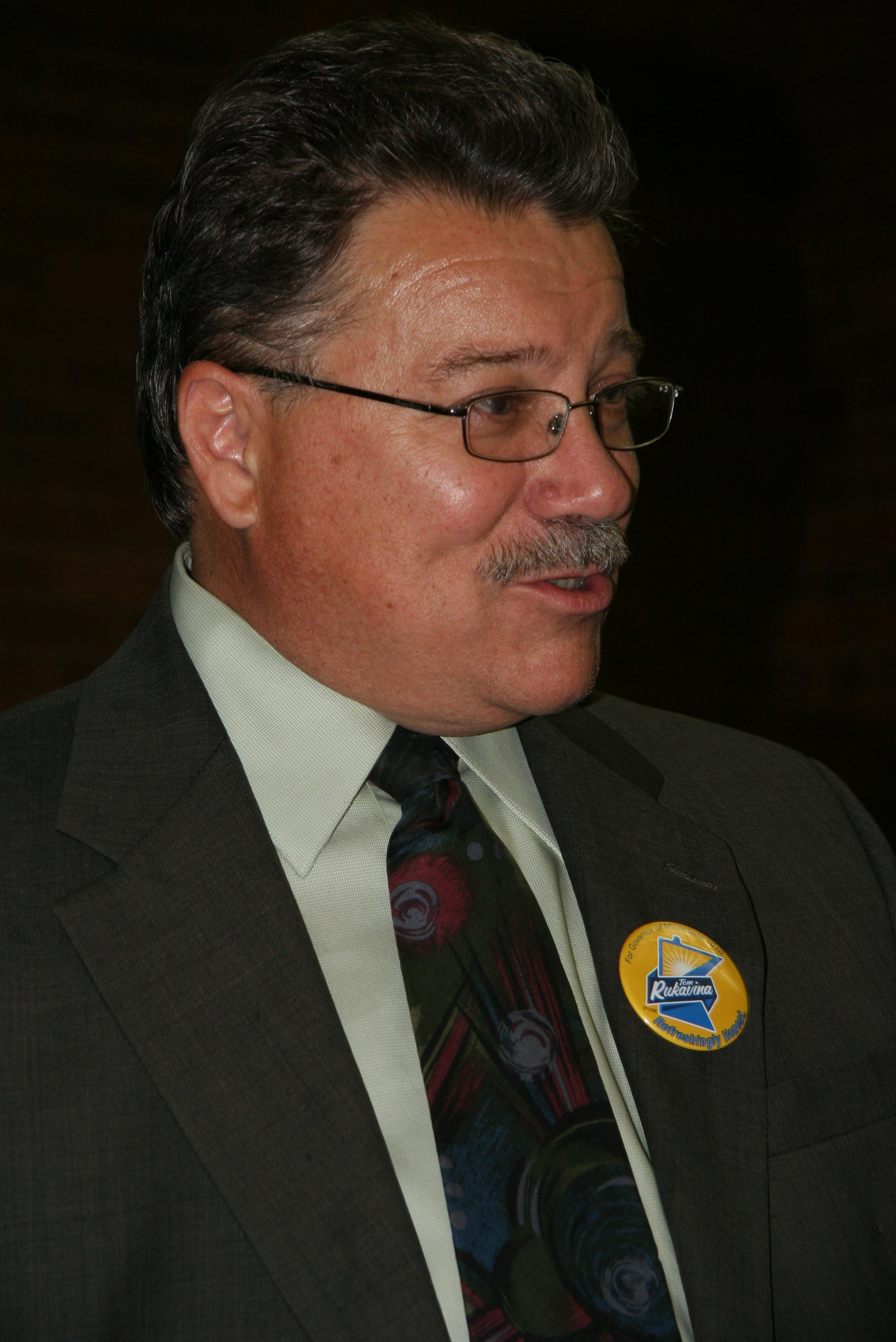

Member of the Minnesota House of Representatives from the 5A district
- In office January 6, 1987 – January 7, 2013
- Preceded by: Dominic J. Elioff
- Succeeded by: Jason Metsa (District 6B)

Personal details
- Born: August 23, 1950 Virginia, Minnesota, U.S.
- Died: January 7, 2019 (aged 68) Minneapolis, Minnesota, U.S.
- Party: Democratic–Farmer–Labor
- Spouse: Jean Rukavina
- Children: 2
- Education: Mesabi Range Community and Technical College; University of Minnesota Duluth

Thomas Rukavina (August 23, 1950 – January 7, 2019) was an American politician and a Democratic–Farmer–Labor (DFL) member of the Minnesota House of Representatives from 1987 to 2013. In 2010 he was an unsuccessful candidate for Governor of Minnesota, seeking the DFL nomination. He was a St. Louis County commissioner from 2015 to 2018.

== Early life ==
Rukavina was born in Virginia, Minnesota, of Croatian and Italian descent, and graduated from the University of Minnesota Duluth with a Bachelor of Arts degree cum laude in political science. He first held elected office in the 1970s on the Virginia school board and the Pike Town Board. Before becoming a full-time legislator, he worked in various positions, including at the Minntac taconite plant, as a logger and a naturalist at the Ironworld Discovery Center in Chisholm, Minnesota, and as an assistant director at Giants Ridge Ski Area.

== Minnesota House of Representatives ==
Rukavina was a member of the Minnesota House of Representatives for thirteen terms, serving from 1987 to 2013. He represented District 5A, which included the Mesabi Range in St. Louis County in northeastern Minnesota. In 2012, he announced he would not seek reelection, citing his frustration with the partisan atmosphere at the state Capitol.

Rukavina proposed a bill that would ban the sale of foreign-made American flags in Minnesota. The bill later passed into law.

In 2009, Rukavina opposed allowing the University of Minnesota to sell beer and wine only in premium seats at TCF Bank Stadium. He insisted that the University alter its policy to sell alcohol to all legal drinkers throughout the stadium, including its own students.

== 2010 gubernatorial campaign ==
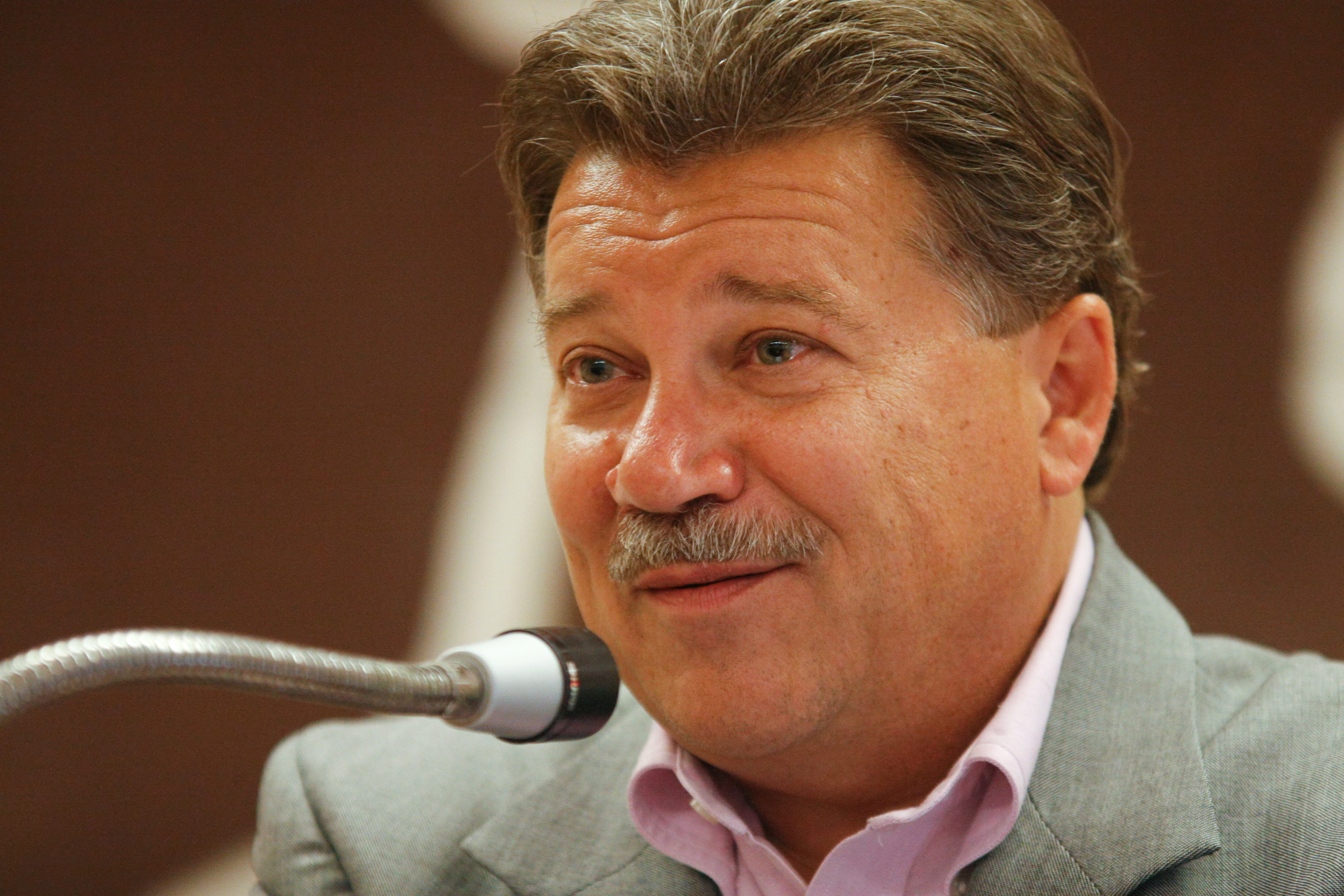
Rukavina speaking in 2009

On July 23, 2009, Rukavina filed paperwork for an exploratory committee for Governor of Minnesota, making his candidacy official in early September at Bayfront Park in Duluth. He was later endorsed by Congressman Jim Oberstar. At the DFL state convention he dropped out of the race and endorsed Margaret Anderson Kelliher.

== Personal life ==
Rukavina was arrested on July 31, 2004, for fourth-degree drunk driving with a blood alcohol level of 0.15. He pleaded guilty to the charge.

Rukavina was married to Jean who previously had three children and Rukavina had two children. Rukavina's daughter Ida worked for U.S. Senator Amy Klobuchar. Ida Rukavina was then Executive Director of the Range Association of Municipalities and Schools (RAMS) starting in July 2021 before being appointed by MN Governor Tim Walz as the new commissioner of Iron Range Resources and Rehabilitation Board in December 2022. He was friends with late U.S. Senator Paul Wellstone, who was flying to attend the funeral of Rukavina's father when his plane fatally crashed in October 2002.

== Death ==
Rukavina died of leukemia on January 7, 2019, at the University of Minnesota Medical Center in Minneapolis, aged 68.

In response to his death, Governor Tim Walz said: "There's folks who put their life into serving Minnesota, and Tom Rukavina was one of those". U.S. Senator Klobuchar said that: "Rukavina understood the dignity of hard work, and was a force for Iron Range workers and their families". Minnesota Attorney General Keith Ellison remembered Rukavina as a "friend, public servant, and a fierce defender of working people" on a statement on Twitter.

== Legacy ==
The Thomas Rukavina Memorial Bridge was named after him after a bill introduced by Dave Tomassoni was passed by the Minnesota legislature. The bridge is located in the Bridgeview Pocket Park on the Mesabi Trail. A public ceremony was held on August 19, 2021, after the bridge was renamed. Guests at the ceremony included U.S. senator Amy Klobuchar.

Minnesota House of Representatives
Preceded by Dominic J. Elioff	Member of the House of Representatives for District 5A; 1987–2013	Succeeded by Jason Metsa
