= Metsa (surname) =

Disambiguation page

Metsa is a surname. Notable people with the surname include:

- Jason Metsa (born 1980), American politician
- Zach Metsa (born 1998), American ice hockey player
