= Patricia Anderson =

American politician (born 1966)

17th Auditor of Minnesota
- In office January 6, 2003 – January 2, 2007
- Governor: Tim Pawlenty
- Preceded by: Judi Dutcher
- Succeeded by: Rebecca Otto

Member of the Minnesota House of Representatives from the 33A district
- Incumbent
- Assumed office January 3, 2023
- Preceded by: Bob Dettmer
- Succeeded by: Stacey Stout (elect)

Personal details
- Born: June 4, 1966 (age 60) Saint Paul, Minnesota, U.S.
- Party: Republican
- Spouse: Doug
- Children: 6
- Education: University of Minnesota (BA); Hamline University (MA)
- Profession: Business owner; Legislator
- Website: Government website Campaign website

Patricia "Patti" Anderson (born June 4, 1966) is an American politician serving in the Minnesota House of Representatives since 2023. A member of the Republican Party of Minnesota, Anderson represents district 33A in the northeastern Twin Cities metropolitan area, which includes the cities of Forest Lake, Hugo, and Mahtomedi and parts of Washington County.

Anderson served one term as the State Auditor of Minnesota, from 2003 to 2007, and ran unsuccessfully in 2006 and 2010. She is the most recent Republican to hold that office. She was mayor of Eagan, Minnesota, and a national committeewoman for Minnesota to the Republican National Committee.

== Early life, education and career ==
Anderson graduated from Forest Lake Area High School and received a Bachelor of Arts in international relations and political economy from the University of Minnesota. She earned a Master of Arts in public administration from Hamline University.

Anderson served as a city council member of Eagan, Minnesota, from 1991 to 1998, and as mayor from 1998 to 2002. In 2002, City Pages named her the state's best mayor.

From 2008 to 2009, Anderson served as president of the Minnesota Free Market Institute, a right-wing think tank. She said that as president she hoped to expand the institute by adding personnel and partnering with nonprofits with similar goals. After Anderson left, the organization was merged into the Center of the American Experiment, last filing tax returns in 2011.

== State Auditor ==
Anderson was elected State Auditor of Minnesota on November 5, 2002. She ran after two-term DFL incumbent Judi Dutcher announced she would not seek reelection, running unsuccessfully for governor of Minnesota. Anderson defeated DFL nominee State Treasurer Carol Johnson and Independence Party nominee Dave Hutcheson.

Anderson was elected as Pat Awada, the name she had before her divorce in 2004. During her term as auditor, Governor Pawlenty called for cuts across the state budget, and Anderson cut staff, earning a reputation as a "taxpayer watchdog".

Anderson ran for reelection in 2006, losing to the DFL nominee, State Representative Rebecca Otto.

== Commissioner of Employee Relations ==
In January 2007, Governor Pawlenty nominated Anderson to serve as Commissioner of Department of Employee Relations. Her responsibilities included the merger of that agency into the Department of Finance.

== 2010 run for governor and state auditor ==
On July 15, 2009, Anderson announced that she was running for governor of Minnesota in the 2010 election, calling herself a "Libertarian-style Republican" who opposes corporate subsidies. On January 12, 2010, Anderson announced that she was withdrawing from the governor's race to run for state auditor. Anderson again lost to incumbent Rebecca Otto.

== Republican National Committeewoman ==
On April 16, 2011, Anderson was elected national committeewoman for Minnesota to the Republican National Committee to serve out the remaining term of Evie Axdahl, who retired. On May 19, 2012, Janet Biehoffer defeated Anderson in her quest for a full term as a national committeewoman to the RNC.

Shortly after being elected to the Republican National Committee, Anderson became a lobbyist for Canterbury Park Racetrack. At the time, the Minnesota Republican Party Platform opposed expanding gambling in Minnesota. Many Republicans criticized Anderson for failing to disclose her intention to become a lobbyist for a gambling enterprise while running for the RNC.

== Minnesota House of Representatives ==
Anderson was elected to the Minnesota House of Representatives in 2022. She first ran in 2018 after seven-term Republican incumbent Matt Dean announced he would not seek reelection to run for governor of Minnesota. Anderson lost to DFL nominee Ami Wazlawik. Anderson ran again in 2022 and won, after redistricting and eight-term Republican incumbent Bob Dettmer announced he would not seek reelection. She was reelected in 2024 and did not seek reelection in 2026.

Anderson serves on the Education Finance and Taxes Committees.

== Electoral history ==
2002 Republican primary for Minnesota State Auditor
Party	Candidate	Votes	%
Republican	Patricia Anderson Awada	131,996	75.45
Republican	Jual Carlos Carlson	42,956	24.55
Total votes		174,952	100.00

2002 Minnesota State Auditor
Party	Candidate	Votes	%
Republican	Patricia Anderson Awada	956,104	44.63
Democratic (DFL)	Carol Johnson	941,129	43.93
Independence	Dave Hutcheson	164,532	7.68
Green	Dave Berger	78,611	3.67
Write-in		1,881	0.09
Total votes		2,142,257	100.00
Republican gain from Democratic (DFL)			

2006 Minnesota State Auditor
Party	Candidate	Votes	%
Democratic (DFL)	Rebecca Otto	1,094,440	51.92
Republican	Patricia Anderson (incumbent)	866,041	41.08
Independence	Lucy Gerold	97,076	4.61
Green	Dave Berger	49,131	2.33
Write-in		1,316	0.06
Total votes		2,108,004	100.00
Democratic (DFL) gain from Republican			

2010 Minnesota State Auditor
Party	Candidate	Votes	%
Democratic (DFL)	Rebecca Otto (incumbent)	981,822	48.39
Republican	Patricia "Pat" Anderson	956,339	47.13
Green	Annie Young	54,154	2.67
Grassroots—LC	Kenny Kalligher	35,548	1.75
Write-in		1,224	0.06
Total votes		2,029,087	100.00
Democratic (DFL) hold			

2018 Minnesota State House - District 38B
Party	Candidate	Votes	%
Democratic (DFL)	Ami Wazlawik	11,573	50.81
Republican	Patti Anderson	11,187	49.11
Write-in		19	0.08
Total votes		22,779	100.00
Democratic (DFL) gain from Republican			

2022 Minnesota State House - District 33A
Party	Candidate	Votes	%
Republican	Patti Anderson	11,694	55.40
Democratic (DFL)	Hanna Valento	9,404	44.55
Write-in		9	0.04
Total votes		21,107	100.00
Republican hold			

2024 Minnesota State House - District 33A
Party	Candidate	Votes	%
Republican	Patti Anderson	15,262	58.01
Democratic (DFL)	Jake Ross	11,020	41.89
Write-in		25	0.10
Total votes		30,766	100.00
Republican hold			

== Personal life ==
Anderson lives in Dellwood, Minnesota, with her spouse, Doug, and has six children.

Party political offices
Preceded by Judi Dutcher	Republican nominee for Minnesota State Auditor; 2002, 2006, 2010	Succeeded by Randy Gilbert
Political offices
Preceded by Judi Dutcher	Minnesota State Auditor; 2003–2007	Succeeded by Rebecca Otto
