= Tony Sertich =

American politician

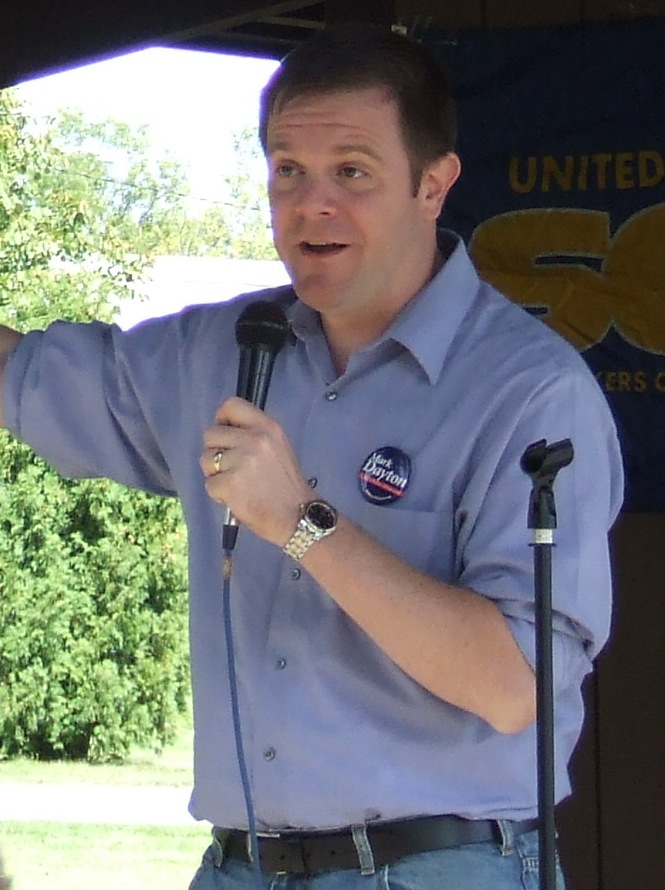
- Sertich in 2010

Commissioner of the Iron Range Resources and Rehabilitation Board
- In office January 13, 2011 – January 1, 2015
- Governor: Mark Dayton
- Preceded by: Sandy Layman
- Succeeded by: Mark Phillips

Majority Leader of the Minnesota House of Representatives
- In office January 2007 – January 4, 2011
- Preceded by: Erik Paulsen
- Succeeded by: Matt Dean

Member of the Minnesota House of Representatives from the 5B district
- In office January 3, 2001 – January 13, 2011
- Preceded by: David Tomassoni
- Succeeded by: Carly Melin

Personal details
- Born: January 2, 1976 (age 50)
- Party: Democratic
- Education: Hamline University (BA)

Anthony "Tony" Sertich (born January 2, 1976) is a Minnesota politician and a former commissioner of the Iron Range Resources and Rehabilitation Board. A Democrat, he served in the Minnesota House of Representatives from 2001 to 2011, representing District 5B, which includes portions of the Iron Range in St. Louis County, which is in the northeastern part of the state. He also served as House Majority Leader from 2007 to 2011.

Sertich was first elected in 2000 at the age of 24, making him the youngest member of the Minnesota Legislature at that time. When Democrats took over the House in 2006, he was selected to serve as majority leader under Speaker Margaret Anderson Kelliher. While he won re-election in 2010, he did not seek a leadership position in the new Republican-controlled legislature. Shortly thereafter, he resigned his seat effective January 13, 2011, to accept Governor Mark Dayton's appointed to head the Iron Range Resources and Rehabilitation Board.

Sertich is a graduate of Hamline University in Saint Paul, where he received a B.A. in Theatre Arts and Political Science. After graduation, he worked for State Senator Jerry Janezich, who also represented the Iron Range. When Janezich ran for the United States Senate in 2000, then-Representative David Tomassoni ran for the Minnesota Senate, opening up the seat to which Sertich was elected.

Political offices
Preceded by Erik Paulsen	Majority Leader of the Minnesota House of Representatives; 2007–2011	Succeeded by Matt Dean
