= Richard Kelly =

Richard Kelly or Kelley may refer to:

== Politics ==
- Richard Kelly (Minnesota politician) (1908–1939), American politician and businessman
- Richard Kelly (Florida politician) (1924–2005), American politician involved in the 1980 Abscam scandal
- Richard F. Kelly (1936–2015), American politician

== Sports ==
- Richard Kelly (Australian cricketer) (1870–1941), Australian cricketer
- Richard Kelly (West Indian cricketer) (born 1984), West Indies cricketer
- Richard Kelly (rugby league) (born 1965), English rugby league player
- Richard Kelly (rugby union) (born 1987), Welsh rugby union player
- Richard Kelly (American football), American football coach
- Rich Kelley (born 1953), American basketball player

== Other ==
- Richard Kelly (British Army officer) (1815–1897), British general
- Richard Kelly (The Tuam Herald) (1810–1884), Irish journalist, founder of The Tuam Herald newspaper
- Richard Kelly (lighting designer) (1910–1977), American architectural lighting designer
- Richard Kelly (filmmaker) (born 1975), American film director
- Richard Kelly, pseudonym of American writer Richard Laymon (1947–2001)
- Richard T. Kelly (born 1970), a British journalist and writer

== See also ==
- Richard Kelley (1904–1984), British Labour Party Member of Parliament
- Rick Kelly (born 1983), Australian racing driver
- Dick M. Kelly (1941–2023), American polician
