= Jason Metsa =

American politician

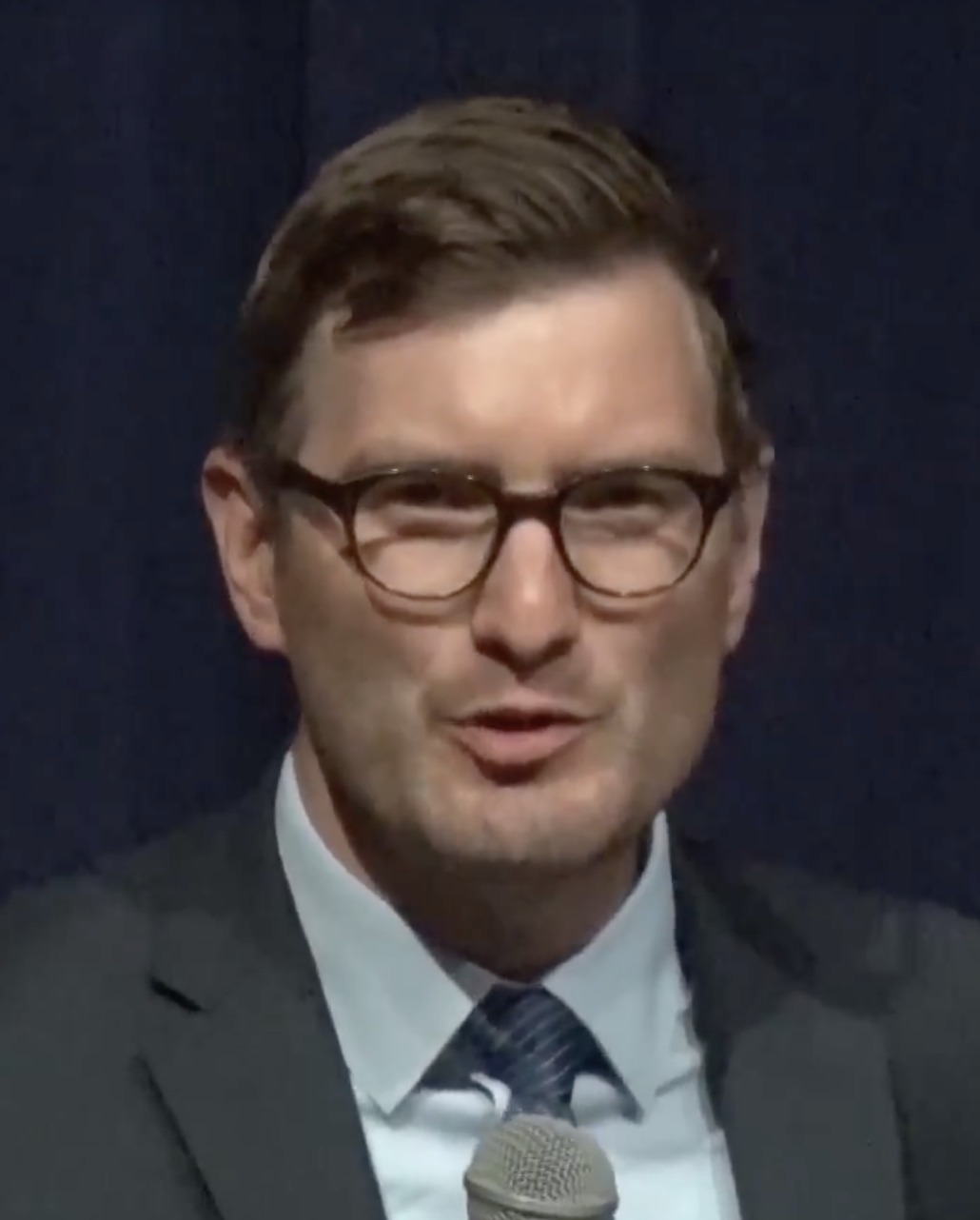
- Metsa in 2018

Deputy Commissioner of the Iron Range Resources and Rehabilitation Board
- In office February 22, 2019 – 2022
- Governor: Tim Walz
- Preceded by: Mary Finnegan
- Succeeded by: Al Becicka

Member of the Minnesota House of Representatives from the 6B district
- In office January 8, 2013 – January 7, 2019
- Preceded by: Tom Rukavina
- Succeeded by: Dave Lislegard

Personal details
- Born: July 17, 1980 (age 46)
- Party: Democratic–Farmer–Labor
- Spouse: Amanda
- Children: 1
- Education: Mesabi Range Community and Technical College (A.A.)

Jason Metsa (born July 17, 1980) is an American politician, a former member of the Minnesota House of Representatives, and the former Deputy Commissioner at the Iron Range Resources and Rehabilitation Board. A member of the Minnesota Democratic–Farmer–Labor Party, he represented District 6B in northeastern Minnesota from 2013 to 2019.

== Education ==
Metsa attended Mesabi Range Community and Technical College, graduating with an associate degree.

== Career ==
=== Minnesota House of Representatives ===
Metsa was first elected to the Minnesota House of Representatives in 2012. He was re-elected in 2014 and 2016. He did not run for re-election in 2018, choosing instead to run in the DFL primary for Minnesota's 8th congressional district.

=== 8th congressional district campaign ===
Metsa was a Democratic candidate for Minnesota's 8th Congressional District in the U.S. House. Metsa lost in the primary election on August 14, 2018.

=== Iron Range Resources and Rehabilitation Board ===
On February 22, 2019, Metsa became the Deputy Commissioner of the Iron Range Resources and Rehabilitation Board. His predecessor was Mary Finnegan, and he was succeeded by Al Becicka in early 2023.

== Personal life ==
Metsa and his wife, Amanda, have one child. According to court records, his wife filed for divorce on July 8, 2024.

On July 6, 2024, Metsa was arrested for 3rd degree criminal sexual conduct. He was also charged with providing alcohol to a minor. He was sentenced to a year of unsupervised monitoring for the alcohol-related charge as the sexual conduct investigation continues.
