= 2014 Minnesota State Auditor election =

- November 4, 2014
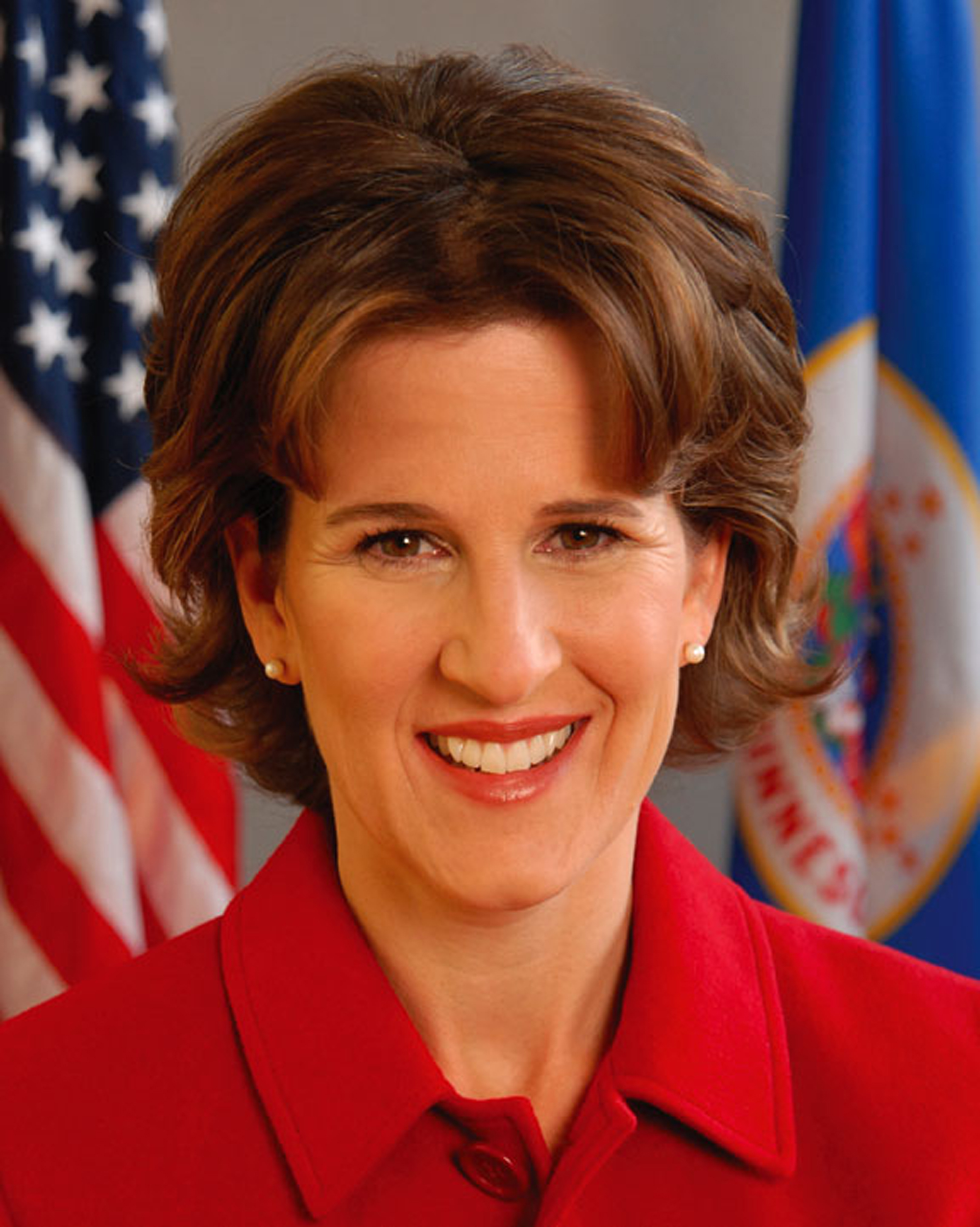

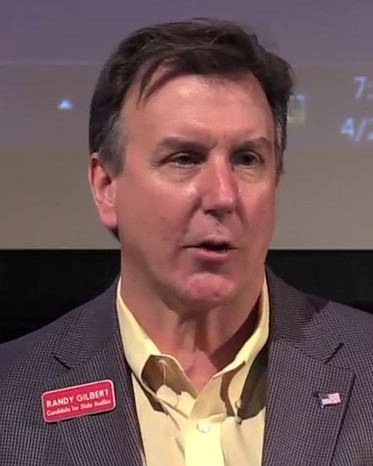
Nominee	Rebecca Otto	Randy Gilbert
Party	Democratic (DFL)	Republican
Popular vote	988,102	766,814
Percentage	51.51%	39.98%
- Otto: 30–40% 40–50% 50–60% 60–70% 70–80% 80–90% >90% Gilbert: 40–50% 50–60% 60–70% 70–80% 80–90% >90% Dean: 40–50% Tie: 30–40% 40–50% 50% No votes
State Auditor before election
Rebecca Otto
Democratic (DFL)
Elected State Auditor
Rebecca Otto
Democratic (DFL)

The 2014 Minnesota State Auditor election was held on November 4, 2014, to elect the Minnesota State Auditor.

Incumbent Democratic–Farmer–Labor State Auditor Rebecca Otto ran for re-election to a third term in office. Primary elections were held on August 12, 2014. The Democratic–Farmer–Labor Party (DFL) renominated Otto, the Republican Party nominated former Long Lake Mayor Randy Gilbert and the Independence Party nominated business owner Pat Dean.

Otto defeated Gilbert in the general election by a significant margin.

== Democratic–Farmer–Labor primary ==
The Democratic–Farmer–Labor endorsement was made on May 31, 2014. Incumbent Rebecca Otto won the endorsement unopposed.

Former Minority Leader of the Minnesota House of Representatives Matt Entenza filed to run on June 3, 2014, less than an hour before the filing deadline. His surprise entrance into the race encountered criticism from prominent DFLers.

=== Candidates ===
==== Declared ====
- Matt Entenza, former Minority Leader of the Minnesota House of Representatives and candidate for Governor in 2010
- Rebecca Otto, incumbent State Auditor (party endorsed)

=== Results ===
Democratic primary election results
Party	Candidate	Votes	%
Democratic (DFL)	Rebecca Otto (incumbent)	149,628	80.93
Democratic (DFL)	Matt Entenza	35,258	19.07
Total votes		184,886	100

== Republican primary ==
The Republican endorsement was made on May 30, 2014. Former mayor of Long Lake Randy Gilbert, who was a candidate for State Auditor in 2010, won the endorsement unopposed.

=== Candidates ===
==== Nominee ====
- Randy Gilbert, former mayor of Long Lake and candidate for State Auditor in 2010 (party endorsed)

=== Results ===
Republican primary election results
Party	Candidate	Votes	%
Republican	Randy Gilbert	147,570	100
Total votes		147,570	100

== Independence primary ==
The Independence Party endorsement was made on May 17, 2014. Pat Dean won the endorsement unopposed.

=== Candidates ===
==== Nominee ====
- Pat Dean, business owner (party endorsed)

=== Results ===
Independence primary election results
Party	Candidate	Votes	%
Independence	Patrick Dean	5,500	100
Total votes		5,500	100

== General election ==
=== Candidates ===
- Rebecca Otto (DFL), incumbent State Auditor
- Randy Gilbert (Republican), former mayor of Long Lake and candidate for State Auditor in 2010
- Pat Dean (Independence), business owner
- Judith Schwartzbacker (Grassroots-Legalize Cannabis)
- Keegan Iversen (Libertarian), former member of the Minnesota Air National Guard and Iraq War veteran

=== Results ===
Minnesota State Auditor election, 2014
Party	Candidate	Votes	%	±%
Democratic (DFL)	Rebecca Otto (incumbent)	988,102	51.51%	+3.12%
Republican	Randy Gilbert	766,814	39.98%	−7.15%
Independence	Pat Dean	76,845	4.01%	N/A
Grassroots	Judith Schwartzbacker	55,132	2.87%	+1.12%
Libertarian	Keegan Iversen	30,397	1.58%	N/A
Write-in		800	0.04%	-0.02%
Total votes		1,918,090	100.0%	
Democratic (DFL) hold				

=== Results by congressional district ===
Otto won six of eight congressional districts, including two that elected Republicans, with the remaining two going to Gilbert, including one that elected a Democrat.

District	Otto	Gilbert	Representative
1st	45.2%	44.9%	Tim Walz
2nd	49%	43%	John Kline
3rd	48%	45%	Erik Paulsen
4th	60%	31%	Betty McCollum
5th	70%	21%	Keith Ellison
6th	43%	49%	Tom Emmer
7th	45%	46%	Collin Peterson
8th	52%	40%	Rick Nolan

== See also ==
- Minnesota elections, 2014
