= Walter Hudson (Minnesota politician) =

American politician

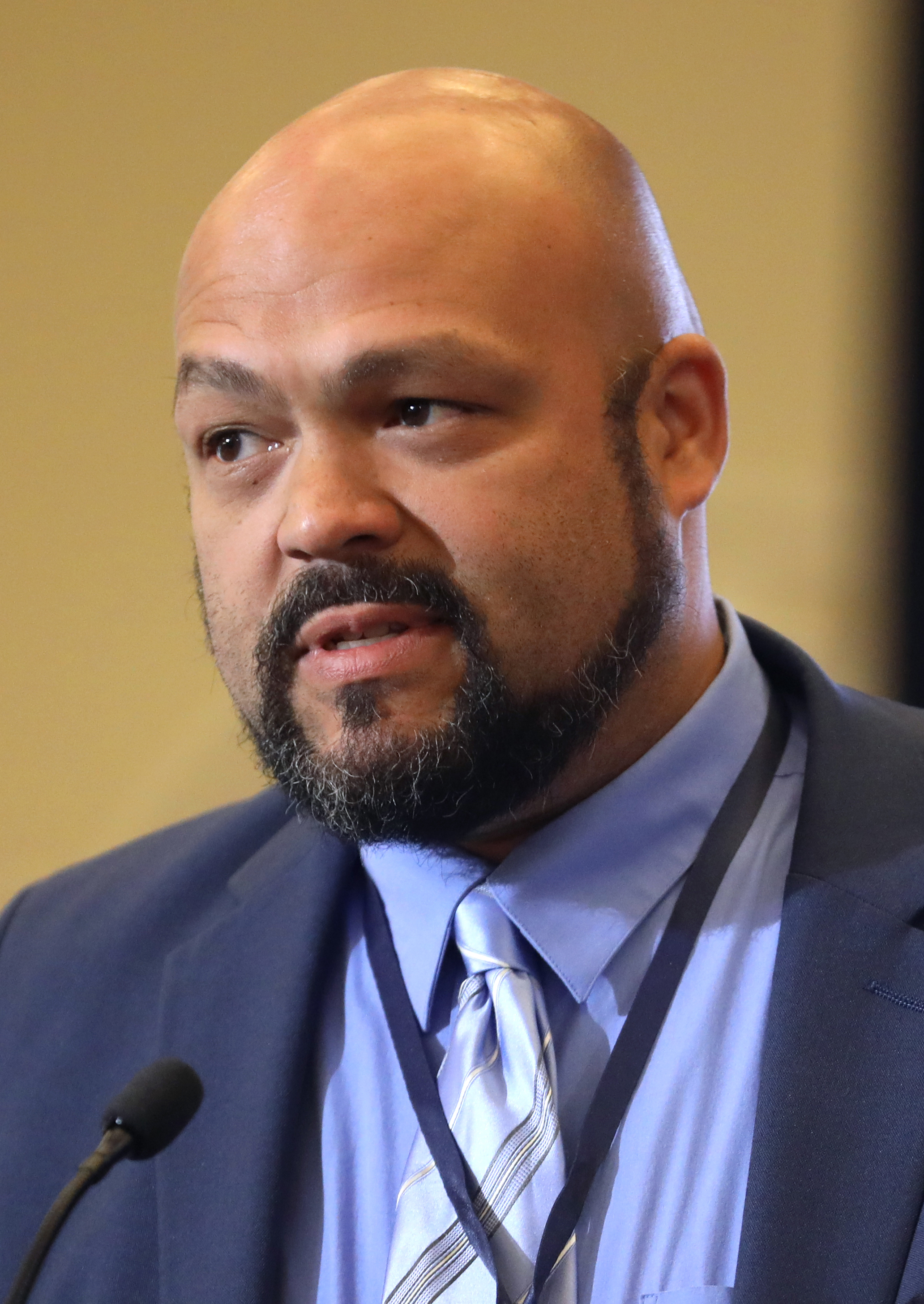

Member of the Minnesota House of Representatives from the 30A district
- Incumbent
- Assumed office January 3, 2023
- Preceded by: Eric Lucero

Personal details
- Born: Detroit, Michigan, U.S.
- Party: Republican
- Spouse: Carrie
- Children: 2
- Education: University of Phoenix (BS)
- Occupation: Business executive/management; Legislator
- Website: Government website Campaign website

Walter Hudson is an American politician serving in the Minnesota House of Representatives since 2023. A member of the Republican Party of Minnesota, Hudson represents District 30A in the northwestern Twin Cities metropolitan area, which includes the cities of St. Michael, Otsego, and Albertville, and parts of Hennepin and Wright Counties.

== Early life, education and career ==
Hudson was born in Detroit, Michigan, to a Black father and a white mother. He received a bachelor's degree in information technology from the University of Phoenix. Hudson served on the Albertville planning commission and the city council from 2014 to 2021.

Hudson has a background in conservative talk radio and hosted the show Closing Argument with Walter Hudson. He has worked for the David Horowitz Freedom Center. He was vice chair of the Republican Liberty Caucus of Minnesota and active in Minnesota's Tea Party Patriot movement. He supported Mike McFadden's 2014 campaign for U.S. Senate.

== Minnesota House of Representatives ==
Hudson was elected to the Minnesota House of Representatives in 2022. He first ran after redistricting and after four-term Republican incumbent Eric Lucero announced he would run for a seat in the Minnesota Senate.

Hudson serves on the Children and Families Finance and Policy and Public Safety Finance and Policy Committees.

=== Political positions ===
==== Education ====
Hudson campaigned on promises to ban "the practice of critical race theory in public education", oppose "the sexualization of students via comprehensive sex ed", and abolish abortion.

==== Healthcare ====
Hudson has spoken at anti-vaccine rallies held by the organization Mask Off MN, and during a December 2022 meeting of the group he compared medical professionals recommending COVID-19 vaccines to slave owners.

In 2025, Hudson co-sponsored a bill to designate messenger RNA (mRNA) treatments, which include several COVID-19 vaccines, "weapons of mass destruction", and make possessing or administering them a crime punishable by up to 20 years in prison. The bill was drafted by a Florida-based hypnotist and conspiracy theorist who believes that mRNA treatments are "nanoparticle injections" that amount to "biological and technological weapons of mass destruction".

Hudson is an anti-abortion activist and believes that women's right to abortion should be abolished. In 2022, he called for women who travel to other states to receive abortions to be arrested for murder.

==== Democracy ====
Hudson's campaign website claimed the 2020 election had questionable outcomes and said "our election system is fundamentally broken and deeply corrupt".

==== Justice ====
In 2015, Hudson said that offenders released on parole should have the right to vote restored to them. In 2023, when a bill restoring the right to vote was before the House, he voted against the bill. During a House hearing, Hudson called on legislators to acknowledge the "widespread demonization" of law enforcement and was nearly called out of order for his conduct. In 2023, he opposed a bill that would set up a system to report incidents of discrimination, saying it would infringe on people's right to free speech. He supported legislation aimed at keeping Native American children in foster care in Native American homes.

Hudson opposed legislation creating a state board focused on youth restorative justice, saying it lacked a "well-defined definition" of restorative justice. He opposed the creation of a department focused on children and families, saying it would "replace love and intimacy with ideology and bureaucracy".

==== Taxation ====
In 2019, Hudson opposed Governor Tim Walz's proposal to increase the state tax on gasoline.

In 2015, he advocated lifting Minnesota's ban on Sunday liquor sales.

==== Freedom of speech ====
In 2025, Hudson proposed legislation that would criminalize the act of protesting "before or about the residence or dwelling of any person, except when the residence or dwelling is used as a place of business". In 2026, he proposed legislation that would make it a gross misdemeanor for anyone to protest outside a personal residence.

==== Personal privacy ====
In 2026, Hudson argued in support of unregulated Flock Cameras in Minnesota. Flock Safety spent $2 million lobbying Minnesota politicians to support its product.

==== Operation Metro Surge ====
In the aftermath of the killing of Renée Good during Operation Metro Surge, Hudson defended Immigration and Customs Enforcement (ICE) officials, releasing a statement before any investigation took place that the killing was "justified" and that use of force is to be expected by anyone interfering with law enforcement. He said Good's death was the fault of Tim Walz, Jacob Frey, and every Democratic official critical of the Trump administration's mass deportation strategy. He said Walz and Frey should be criminally charged for their speech critical of ICE operations.

After ICE officers killed Alex Pretti, Hudson tweeted: "And then he brandished a gun while impeding federal law enforcement. A good story can always end poorly with stupid choices." Journalist A. J. Lagoe replied: "Sir, please point me to a single piece of video where he brandishes a gun." Hudson responded: "We don't require a video. We have an official statement from DHS which has not been disproven." Local media reports and gun rights advocates such as the Minnesota Gun Owners Caucus clarified that videos of the shooting showed that Pretti was holding a phone to record ICE agents and did not brandish a gun.

Hudson publicly called on President Trump to invoke the insurrection act of 1807 to place federal troops on the ground during this time.

==== Donald Trump ====
Hudson was a "Never Trump" Republican in 2016, saying Donald Trump's nomination would "have detrimental impacts on the Republican Party of Minnesota for cycles to come". In 2014, he advocated in support of Rand Paul, who was considering a 2016 presidential campaign. Hudson wrote an opinion piece in which he called Trump a fascist, comparing him to Benito Mussolini. Hudson wrote, "Trump exhibits the vindictiveness of an undisciplined child, coupled with an eagerness to satisfy that impulse with force...Similarly, Donald Trump is not Adolf Hitler, but both are fascists. Each believes that the individual should be subordinated entirely to the state under the whim of an unbridled leader. That's the relevant comparison, and one which should inform a voter's decision."

Since 2016, Hudson has supported Trump, saying he has "seen no evidence" that Trump is racist or has pushed racially discriminatory policies. After the killing of Charlie Kirk during Trump's second term, Hudson advocated for a minimum of one year of jail time for anyone who called the Trump administration or other Republican officials fascist.

In 2026, Hudson refused to condemn conspiracy theories Trump put forth about the assassination of his colleague Melissa Hortman. Trump shared on social media that the 2025 shootings of Minnesota legislators were a plot by Governor Tim Walz to cover up fraud in the state. Hudson defended Trump's right to push the conspiracy theory in sworn testimony to the United States House Oversight Committee. He later said that some people's reaction to Kirk's death was the main reason he supported Trump's right to spread conspiracy theories about Hortman's death.

== Personal life ==
Hudson lives in Albertville, Minnesota, with his wife, Carrie, and has two children.

In 2026, Hudson was intoxicated in public at 2:11 a.m. while carrying a firearm. His firearm, magazines, and holster were confiscated by the White Bear Lake police department during the DUI arrest of fellow state representative Elliott Engen, when Hudson was in the car along with an open bottle of liquor. Both Hudson and Engen were removed from their committee assignments by their party and the state DFL filed an ethics complaint against them.

== Electoral history ==
2022 Minnesota State House - District 30A
Party	Candidate	Votes	%
Republican	Walter Hudson	12,728	62.65
Democratic (DFL)	Sonja Buckmeier	7,570	37.26
Write-in		18	0.09
Total votes		20,316	100.0
Republican hold			
