= Jerry Janezich =

American politician (born 1950)

Member of the Minnesota Senate from the 5th district
- In office January 5, 1993 – January 2, 2001
- Preceded by: Ronald Dicklich
- Succeeded by: David Tomassoni

Minnesota State Representative for District 5B
- In office January 3, 1989 – January 5, 1993
- Preceded by: Lona Minne
- Succeeded by: David Tomassoni

Personal details
- Born: March 16, 1950 (age 76)
- Party: DFL
- Spouse: Patricia
- Children: 3
- Education: St. Cloud State University
- Occupation: Bartender and small business owner

Jerry Janezich (born March 16, 1950) is a Minnesota politician, a former member of the Minnesota legislature, and a former candidate for the United States Senate. Janezich served two terms in the Minnesota House of Representatives, and two terms in the Minnesota Senate.

== Biography ==
Janezich was born the son of an iron miner on Minnesota's Iron Range. He received a bachelor's degree in speech from St. Cloud State University. Later, he co-founded and operated a bar in his home town of Chisholm, Minnesota.

Janezich was first elected to the state house of representatives in 1988, and served two terms, before running successfully for state senate in 1992. In 2000, he sought the Democratic-Farmer-Labor Party (DFL) endorsement for the senate seat held by Republican Sen. Rod Grams. Janezich won the endorsement of his party at its state convention, but lost in the primary election to former State Auditor Mark Dayton.

Janezich retired from politics after his term expired in 2001. He is married, and has three children.

From 2016 to 2026 Janezich served on the Board of Trustees for the Minnesota State Colleges and Universities. On June 5, 2026 Minnesota North College named a building on their Hibbing campus in his honor.

Political offices
Preceded by Ronald Dicklich	Minnesota State Senator for the 5th District; 1993-2001	Succeeded by David Tomassoni
Preceded by Lona Minne	Minnesota State Representative for District 5B; 1989-1993	Succeeded by David Tomassoni
Party political offices
Preceded by Ann Wynia	Endorsed Candidate for United States Senator from Minnesota (Class 1), Minnesota DFL State Convention; 2000	Succeeded by Amy Klobuchar
