= Elliott Engen =

American politician

Member of the Minnesota House of Representatives from the 36A district
- Incumbent
- Assumed office January 3, 2023
- Preceded by: Redistricted
- Succeeded by: Jim DeMay (elect)

Personal details
- Born: October 6, 1998 (age 28)
- Party: Republican
- Spouse: Faith
- Education: Hamline University (BA)
- Website: State House website Campaign website

Elliott Engen (born October 6, 1998) is an American politician serving since 2023 in the Minnesota House of Representatives. A member of the Republican Party of Minnesota, Engen represents District 36A in the northern Twin Cities metropolitan area, which includes the cities of Lino Lakes and Circle Pines, White Bear Township, and parts of Anoka and Ramsey Counties.

== Early life, education, and career ==
Engen attended White Bear High School in White Bear Lake, Minnesota. He earned a bachelor's degree in legal studies and political science from Hamline University.

While attending Hamline, Engen started a chapter of the conservative student organization Turning Point USA. Iowa state representative Joe Mitchell encouraged Engen run for office while the two were discussing policy and their support of Donald Trump at a Turning Point USA Student Action Summit. Engen was inspired by and modeled his debate style after Charlie Kirk.

Engen worked for a wildlife conservation group focused on invasive species prevention, but left the job before joining the legislature.

== Minnesota House of Representatives ==
Engen was elected to the Minnesota House of Representatives in 2022. He first ran in 2020, challenging one-term DFL incumbent Ami Wazlawik and losing by 100 votes. He ran again and won in 2022 in an open seat created by legislative redistricting and Wazlawik's retirement. He is the first Generation Z Republican elected to the Minnesota Legislature.

Engen serves as an assistant minority leader for the House Republican caucus and sits on the Human Services Policy, Public Safety Finance and Policy, and Rules and Legislative Administration Committees.

In 2025, Engen announced his candidacy for Minnesota State Auditor. His campaign launch focused on recent incidents of fraud in Minnesota. The office of State Auditor is intended to be nonpartisan, but Engen ran an ad saying he would investigate his political opponents and implement a DOGE-style audit of the state. On June 3, 2026, after an ethics controversy over a recent DWI arrest, Engen ended his bid for state auditor, opting to instead file for reelection to the Minnesota House of Representatives.

In 2026, Engen and the other Minnesota House Republicans blocked a vote on a package of bills that would ban assault rifles, high-capacity magazines, ghost guns (weapons with no serial number), and anonymous threat reporting. The bills also set aside money for school safety and mental health programs. During the debate on these bills, Engen accused Representative Aisha Gomez of telling him on the House floor to shoot himself. Video later emerged showing that Gomez had not said that, but rather "think of them, not yourself, how about that?" in reference to the parents of two children killed in the Annunciation Catholic Church shooting. Engen nevertheless demanded that Gomez face consequences for their verbal dispute.

=== Political positions ===
Engen's 2022 campaign platform focused on "public safety, education, and pocketbook concerns". He is anti-abortion and has said it "won't be an issue that Republicans address" due to an earlier state supreme court decision. Engen has voted against legislation that codified the right to an abortion into state law, and a law to restore voting rights for felons serving parole. He opposed a move to raise legislators' per diem payments, calling it "self-centered" and "egregious".

In 2023, Engen authored the "Safe Haven In Every Local District (SHIELD) Act", which would require school security system improvements.

During the 2024 dispute between the City of Minneapolis and Uber/Lyft, he argued that the city law helping Uber/Lyft drivers collectively bargain would lead to more expensive rides.

In 2025, Engen voted against using the Environment and Natural Resources Trust Fund to combat invasive species in Minnesota.

During a townhall event, Engen said he believed that conflicts between protesters and ICE agents during Operation Metro Surge, including the killing of Renée Good and the killing of Alex Pretti, were the fault of Minnesota Governor Tim Walz.

== Personal life ==
Engen lives in White Bear Township, Minnesota, with his wife, Faith.

On March 27, 2026, during his campaign for state auditor, Engen was arrested by the White Bear Lake Police Department on suspicion of DWI after being stopped for traffic violations that included speeding, expired registration, and an inoperable headlight. In the car with Engen was his fellow state representative Walter Hudson, who was intoxicated with a loaded firearm and a bottle of alcohol in a child's car seat. Engen was booked into the Ramsey County Adult Detention Center and released on a pending charge of fourth-degree DWI after a breathalyzer test indicated a blood alcohol level of 0.142%, above the 0.08% legal limit. House Speaker Lisa Demuth expressed disappointment in Engen and said further political consequences were possible pending the legal process. The state DFL later filed an ethics complaint against Engen and Hudson.

== Electoral history ==
2020 Minnesota State House - District 38B
Party	Candidate	Votes	%
Democratic (DFL)	Ami Wazlawik (incumbent)	13,906	50.12
Republican	Elliott Engen	13,806	49.76
Write-in		32	0.12
Total votes		27,744	100.0
Democratic (DFL) hold			

2022 Minnesota State House - District 36A
Party	Candidate	Votes	%
Republican	Elliott Engen	11,705	51.39
Democratic (DFL)	Susie Strom	11,063	48.57
Write-in		10	0.04
Total votes		22,778	100.0
Republican hold			

2024 Minnesota State House - District 36A
Party	Candidate	Votes	%
Republican	Elliott Engen	14,998	54.06
Democratic (DFL)	Janelle Calhoun	12,714	45.83
Write-in		29	0.10
Total votes		27,741	100.0
Republican hold			
