= David Tomassoni =

American politician (1952–2022)

Dave Tomassoni
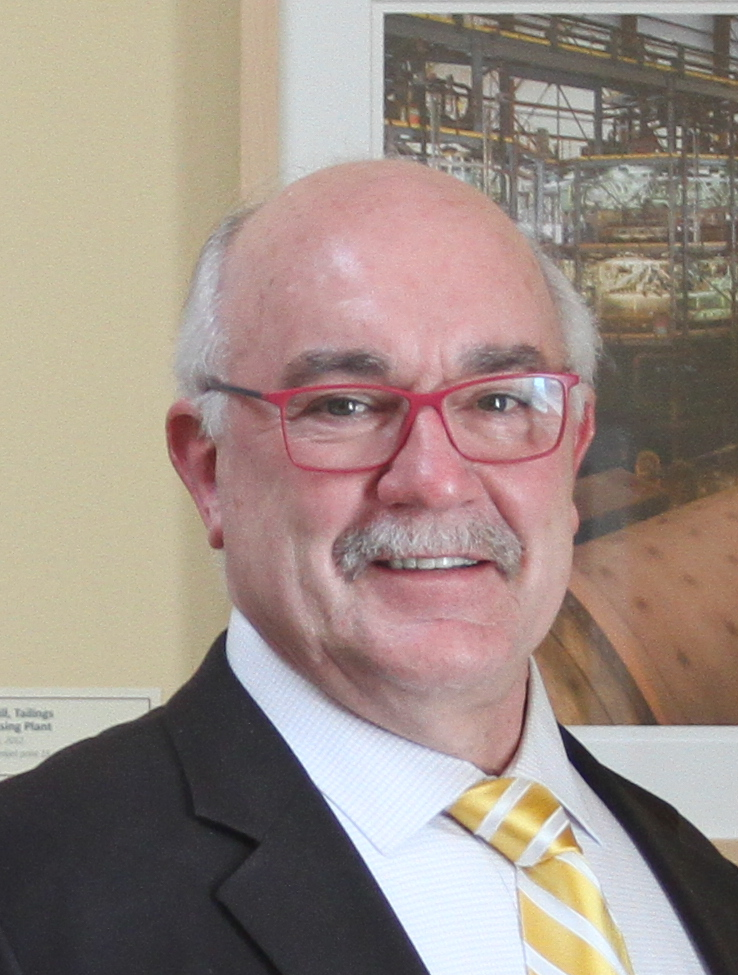
- Tomassoni in 2018

President pro tempore of the Minnesota Senate
- In office January 5, 2021 – August 11, 2022
- Preceded by: Mary Kiffmeyer
- Succeeded by: Ann Rest

President of the Minnesota Senate
- In office November 12, 2020 – January 7, 2021
- Preceded by: Jeremy Miller
- Succeeded by: Jeremy Miller

Member of the Minnesota Senate from the 6th district
- In office January 3, 2001 – August 11, 2022
- Preceded by: Jerry Janezich
- Succeeded by: Robert Farnsworth

Member of the Minnesota House of Representatives from the 5B district
- In office January 5, 1993 – January 2, 2001
- Preceded by: Redistricted
- Succeeded by: Tony Sertich

Personal details
- Born: David Joseph Tomassoni; December 5, 1952 Bemidji, Minnesota, U.S.
- Died: August 11, 2022 (aged 69) Duluth, Minnesota, U.S.
- Party: Democratic (before 2020); Independent (2020–2022)
- Spouse: Charlotte
- Children: 3
- Education: University of Denver (BS)

David Joseph Tomassoni (/tɒməˈsoʊni/ tom-ə-SOH-nee; December 5, 1952 – August 11, 2022) was an American politician who served in the Minnesota Legislature from 1993 to 2022. A former member of the Minnesota Democratic–Farmer–Labor Party (DFL), Tomassoni left the party to become independent in November 2020 and joined the Minnesota Senate Republican Caucus.

Tomassoni chaired the Senate Economic Development Committee from 2007 to 2010. He then chaired the Environment, Economic Development and Agriculture Finance Division, co-chaired the Legislative-Citizen Commission on Minnesota Resources (LCCMR), and chaired the Iron Range Resources & Rehabilitation Board (IRRRB) four times. Tomassoni was also vice chair of the Minnesota Amateur Sports Commission.

== Early life, education, and career ==
Tomassoni was born in Bemidji, Minnesota. He graduated from Chisholm High School in Chisholm, Minnesota and received a BSBA from the University of Denver. Tomassoni played professional hockey in Italy for 16 years and for the Italian national team at the 1984 Winter Olympics.

== Minnesota House of Representatives ==
Tomassoni represented District 5B in the Minnesota House of Representatives from 1993 to 2001. He served as an assistant majority leader from 1997 to 2001.

== Minnesota Senate ==
Tomassoni was elected to the Senate in 2000 and reelected in 2002, 2006, 2010, 2012, 2016, and 2020. He was a majority whip from 2001 to 2007.

== President of the Minnesota Senate ==
Tomassoni was elected president of the Minnesota Senate on November 12, 2020, in a rare event where the Senate's Republican majority supported a member of the DFL for Senate president. The move was seen as strategic, given that the slim Republican majority in the Senate could be lost if the Senate president became lieutenant governor. That happened in 2018, when Senate President Michelle Fischbach became lieutenant governor after Tina Smith was appointed to the U.S. Senate.

Three weeks after the 2020 elections, when it was determined that the DFL had not won a Senate majority, Tomassoni and Senator Thomas Bakk announced they had left the DFL to form their own "Independent Caucus." Republican Majority Leader Paul Gazelka welcomed the move and made Tomassoni chair of the Higher Education Finance and Policy Committee in exchange for voting with Republicans on floor votes. This changed the Senate's composition to 34 Republicans, 31 Democrats, and two independents.

== Electoral history ==
Minnesota Senate 6th district election, 2020
Party	Candidate	Votes	%	±%
Democratic (DFL)	David Tomassoni	25,557	57.04	−5.65pp
Republican	John J. Moren	19,191	42.83	+5.65pp

Minnesota Senate 6th district election, 2016
Party	Candidate	Votes	%	±%
Democratic (DFL)	David Tomassoni	26,260	62.69	−8.89pp
Republican	Skeeter Tomczak	15,555	37.13	+8.89pp

Minnesota Senate 6th district election, 2012
Party	Candidate	Votes	%	±%
Democratic (DFL)	David Tomassoni	30,882	71.58	+1.87pp
Republican	Brandon Anderson	12,220	28.32	−1.87pp

Minnesota Senate 5th district election, 2010
Party	Candidate	Votes	%	±%
Democratic (DFL)	David Tomassoni	22,322	69.71	−8.12pp
Republican	Matt Matasich	9,666	30.19	+8.09pp

Minnesota Senate 5th district election, 2006
Party	Candidate	Votes	%	±%
Democratic (DFL)	David Tomassoni	26,143	77.83	+0.84pp
Republican	Matt Matasich	7,422	22.10	−0.81pp

Minnesota Senate 5th district election, 2002
Party	Candidate	Votes	%	±%
Democratic (DFL)	David Tomassoni	27,372	76.99	
Republican	Matt Matasich	8,147	22.91	

== Personal life and death ==
Tomassoni and his wife, Charlotte, have three children and lived in Chisholm, Minnesota. He was involved in the insurance business. In July 2021, Tomassoni announced he had been diagnosed with amyotrophic lateral sclerosis.

Tomassoni died of ALS at a hospice in Duluth, Minnesota, on August 11, 2022.

Political offices
Preceded by Jeremy Miller	President of the Minnesota Senate; 2020–2021	Succeeded by Jeremy Miller
Preceded by Jeremy Miller	President of the Minnesota Senate; Acting; 2021	Succeeded by David Osmek
Minnesota Senate
Preceded by Mary Kiffmeyer	President pro tempore of the Minnesota Senate; 2021–2022	Succeeded by Ann Rest
