= Elizabeth Carney Pope =

American artist

- Born: Elizabeth Jeanette Carney; 1910; Hamilton, Montana
- Died: 1991 (aged 80–81)
- Known for: muralist

Elizabeth Carney Pope (1910–1991) was an American painter. Pope used a variety of names during her career including Elizabeth Jeanette Carney, Betty Carney, Elizabeth Carney, and Betty Carney Pope. She is best known for her New Deal era mural in the Chisholm, Minnesota Post Office.

== Biography ==
Pope née Carney was in 1910 in Hamilton, Montana. She studied at the Minneapolis School of Fine Arts and the School of Fine Arts at Fontainbleau. Around 1940 she married the photographer W. Kenneth Pope.

In 1941 Pope painted the mural Discovery of Ore for the Chisholm, Minnesota Post Office. The mural was funded by the Treasury Section of Fine Arts (TSFA).

Pope was also a printmaker and painter, exhibiting her work at the Minnesota State Fair, the Minneapolis Institute of Art, and the Art Institute of Chicago. She also exhibited for several years with a group called the Northern California Arts.

Pope taught at Hamilton University in St. Paul and the Minneapolis School of Fine Arts.

Pope died in 1991.
