= Dominic J. Elioff =

American politician (1931–2026)

Member of the Minnesota House of Representatives from the 5A district
- In office January 3, 1979 – January 5, 1987

Personal details
- Born: March 7, 1931
- Died: October 15, 2026 (aged 95)
- Party: Minnesota Democratic–Farmer–Labor Party
- Spouse: Josephine
- Children: two
- Education: Minnesota State University, Mankato, Bemidji State University, University of Minnesota, University of Minnesota Duluth
- Occupation: College Instructor

Dominic Joseph Elioff (March 7, 1931 – October 15, 2026) was an American politician in the state of Minnesota. He served in the Minnesota House of Representatives from 1979–1986. Elioff died on October 15, 2026, at the age of 95.
