= Chisholm, Minnesota =

City in Minnesota, United States

Chisholm
- City
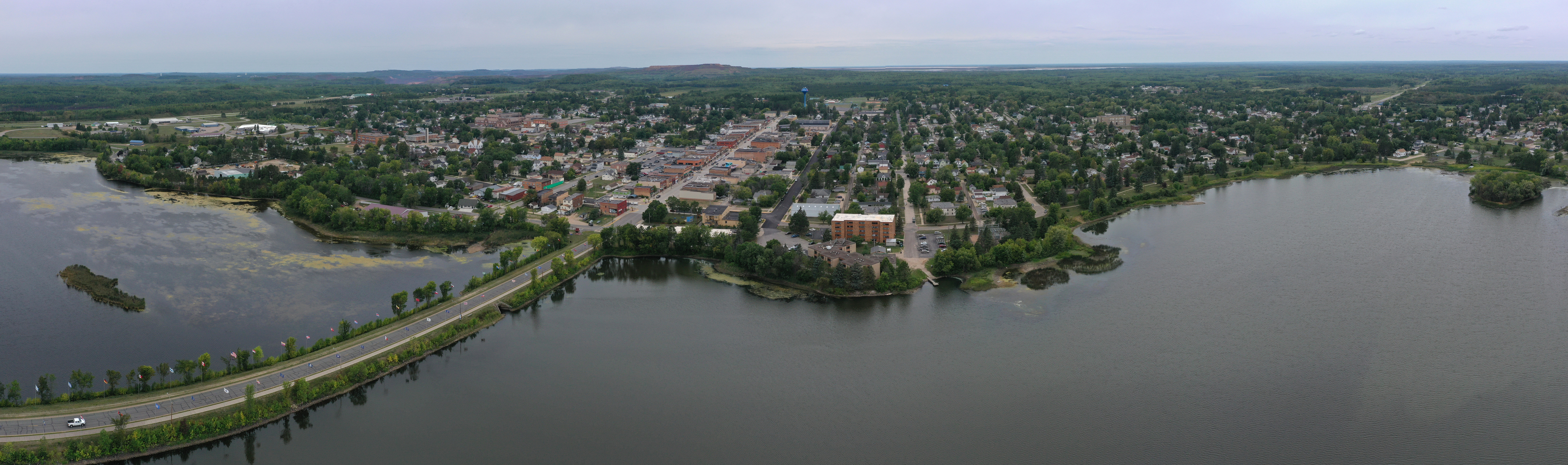
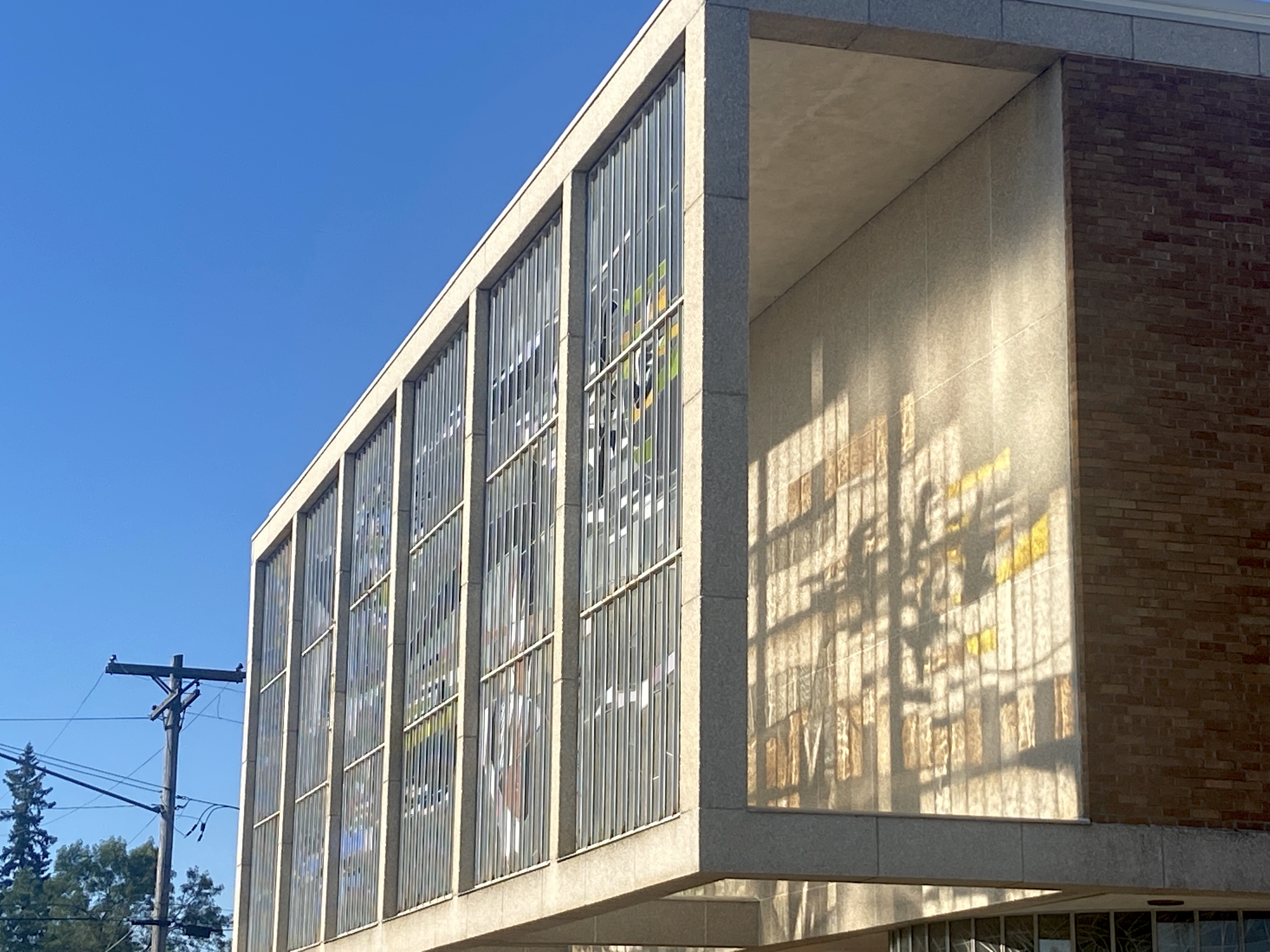
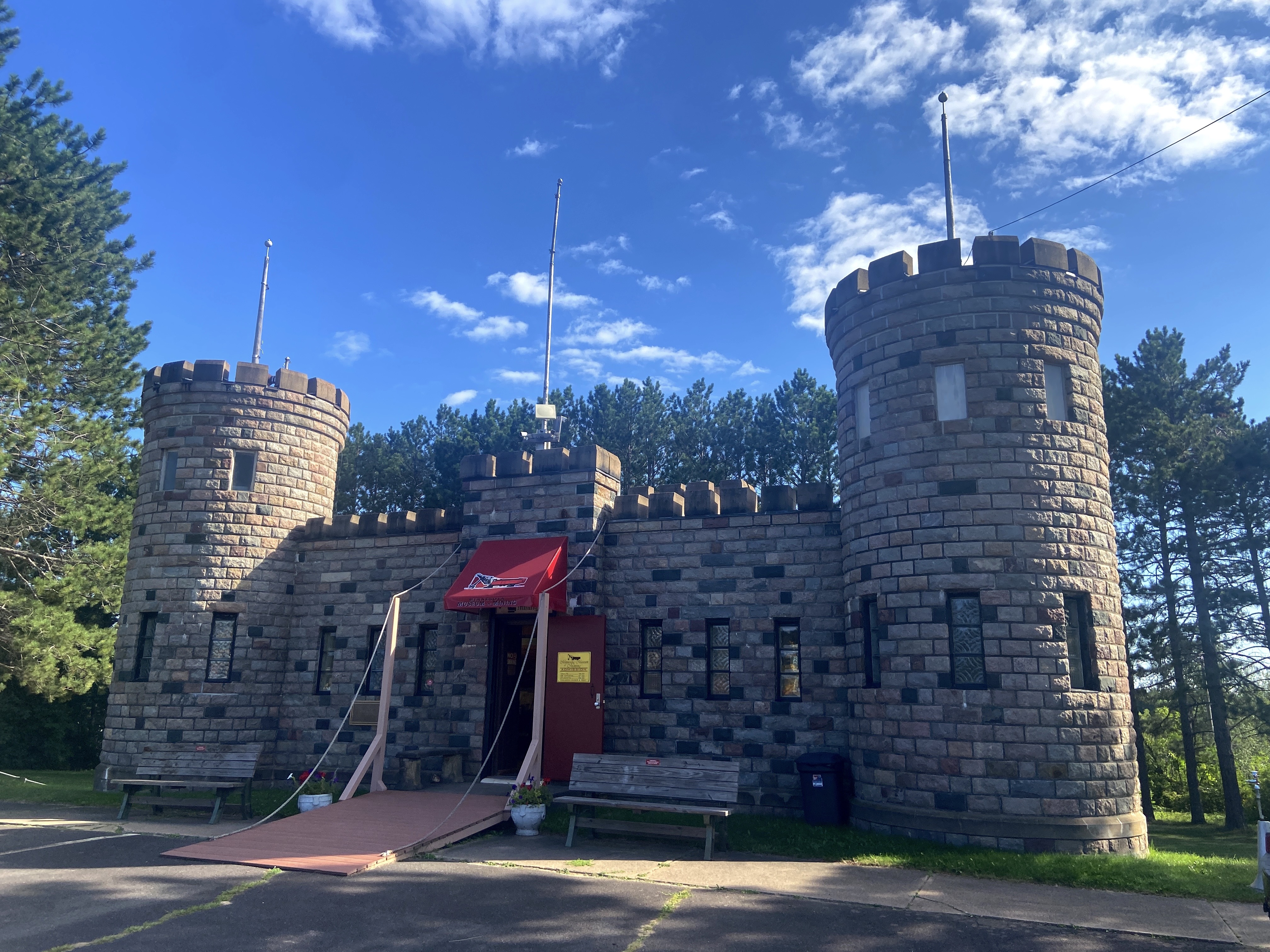
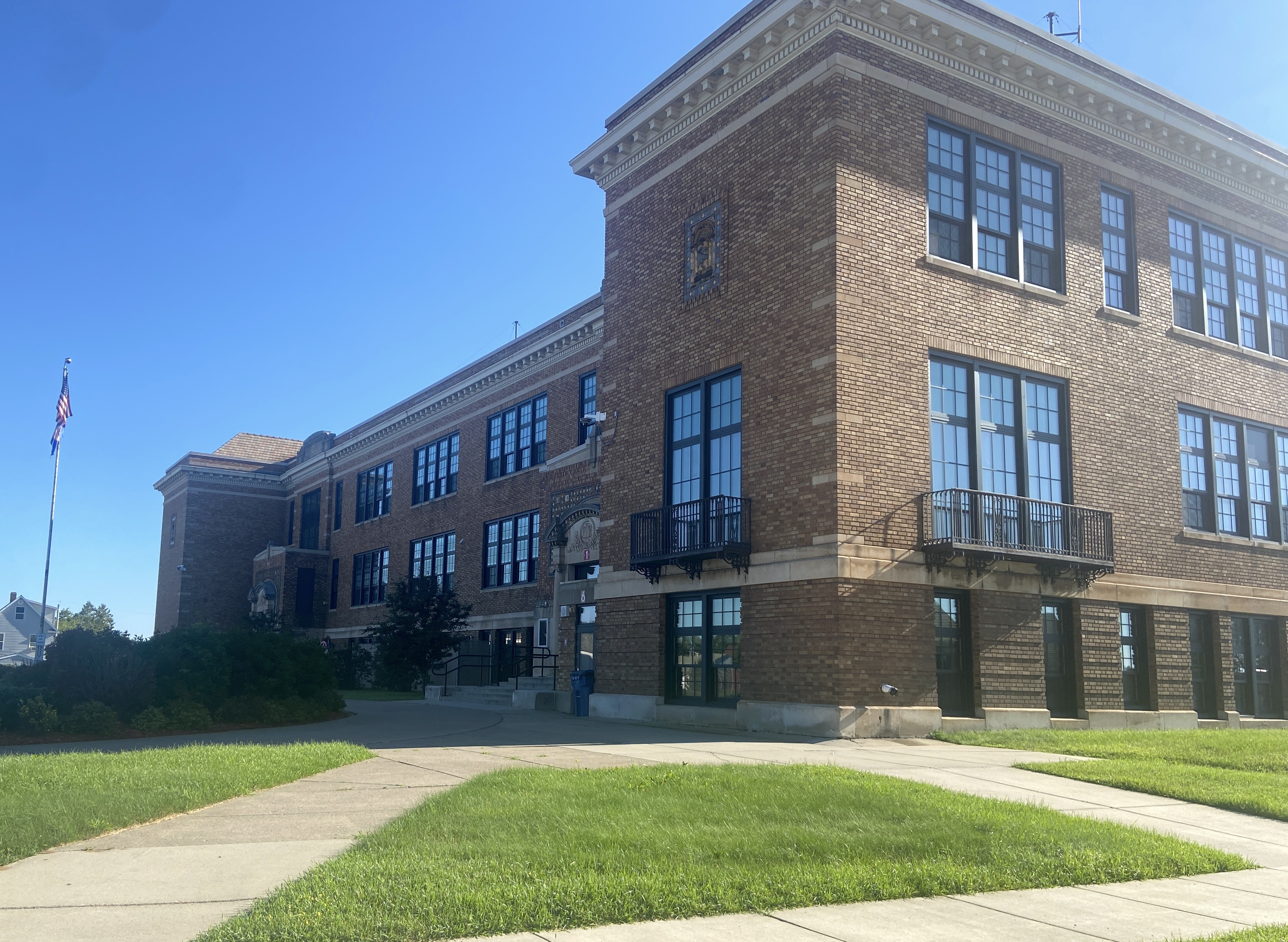
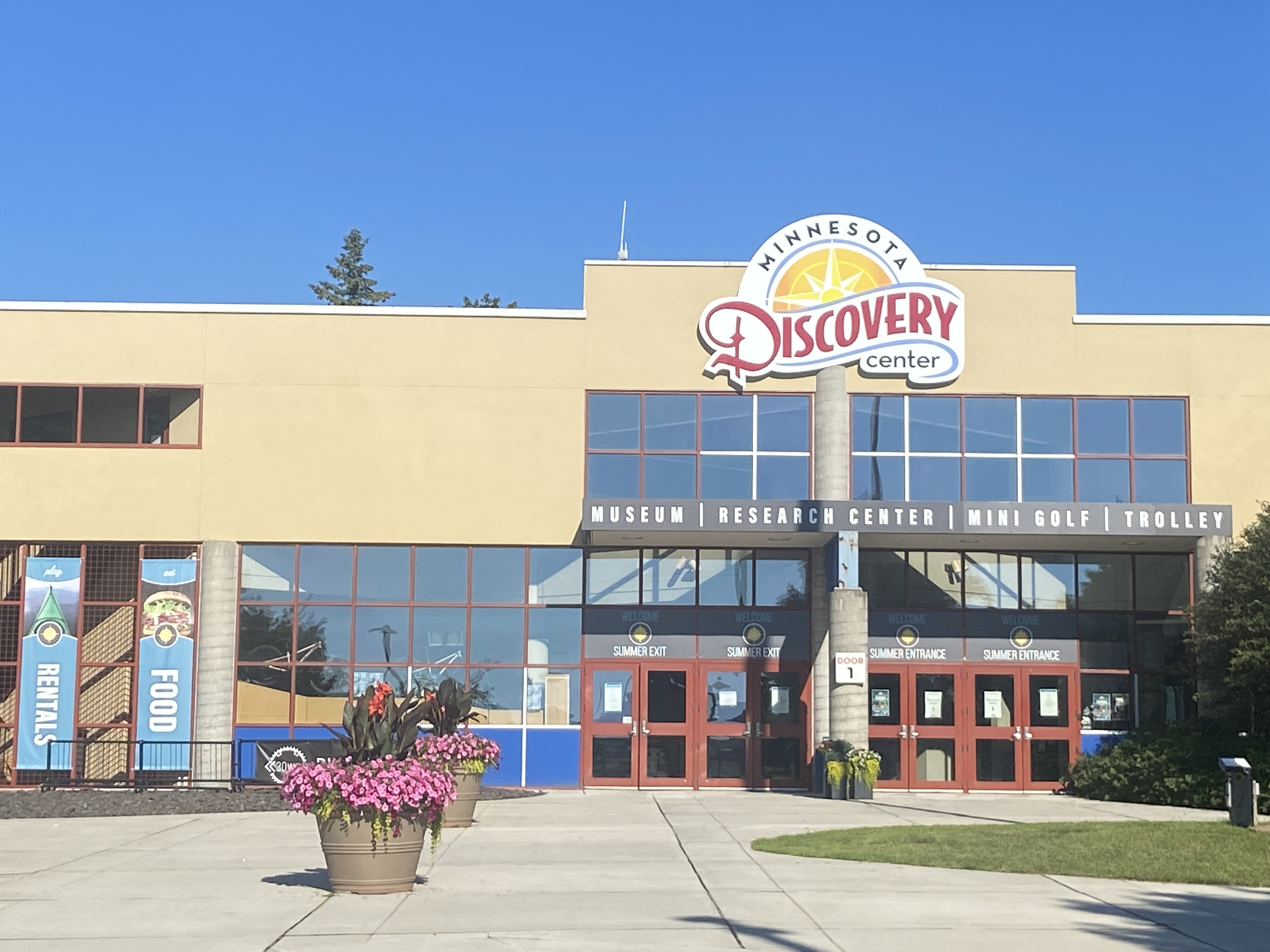
- Clockwise from the top: Aerial panorama of Chisholm, Minnesota Museum of Mining, Minnesota Discovery Center, Chisholm Elementary, and St. Joseph Catholic Church

- Location of the city of Chisholm within St. Louis County, Minnesota
- Coordinates: 47°29′28″N 92°52′44″W
- Country: United States
- State: Minnesota
- County: St. Louis
- Incorporated: July 23, 1901

Area
  - Total: 4.73 sq mi (12.24 km^{2})
  - Land: 4.47 sq mi (11.57 km^{2})
  - Water: 0.26 sq mi (0.67 km^{2})
- Elevation: 1,539 ft (469 m)

Population (2020)
  - Total: 4,775
  - Density: 1,068.5/sq mi (412.56/km^{2})
- Time zone: UTC-6 (Central (CST))
  - Summer (DST): UTC-5 (CDT)
- ZIP codes: 55719
- Area code: 218
- FIPS code: 27-11386
- GNIS feature ID: 0660998
- Website: City of Chisholm

Chisholm is a small town in St. Louis County, Minnesota, United States. The population was 4,775 at the 2020 census. The city has been called "The Heart of the Iron Range" due to its location in the middle of the Mesabi Iron Range.

== History ==
The city was named for its founder, Archibald Mark Chisholm (1862–1933), a mining man and investor from Glengarry County, Ontario, Canada. Chisholm was incorporated in 1901. A post office called Chisholm has been in operation since 1901. With a railroad line to Duluth and plenty of mining work available in and near town, Chisholm's population grew rapidly, and by 1908 it had more than 6,000 people and 500 buildings. On September 5, 1908, a fast-moving forest fire obliterated the town due to dry conditions and the wooden construction of nearly all the town's buildings. Many people escaped by going into the lake. No one died in the fire. Afterward, building codes were enhanced, and by the next summer, more than 70 fireproof buildings had been erected.

Chisholm became a city in 1934.

=== 1930s and 1940s ===
Chisholm experienced significant change throughout the 20th and early 21st centuries, reflecting the booms and busts of the iron mining industry. The 1930s were a challenging time for Chisholm. The Great Depression affected iron ore demand, leading to mine closures and unemployment. Workers faced labor unrest and strikes. World War II brought renewed demand for iron ore, reviving Chisholm's economy.

Muralist Elizabeth Carney Pope completed a Works Progress Administration (WPA) mural, Discovery of Ore, in the Chisholm post office in 1941.

=== 1970s and 1980s ===
The 1970s saw a decline in iron ore prices and a shift to foreign competition. Mines in and near Chisholm began closing again, resulting in job losses and population decline. The city grappled with economic diversification efforts.

=== Since the 1990s ===
The late 20th and early 21st centuries brought continued adjustments. Tourism and healthcare emerged as new economic sectors. Chisholm focused on preserving its mining history and revitalizing its downtown area. It maintains a strong connection to its iron mining past. The Minnesota Museum of Mining and the Minnesota Discovery Center interprets the region's mining history, and the city hosts festivals and events celebrating its heritage.

== Geography ==
According to the United States Census Bureau, the city has an area of 4.74 square miles (12.28 km^{2}); 4.48 square miles (11.60 km^{2}) is land and 0.26 square miles (0.67 km^{2}) is water.

Chisholm is in the center of the Mesabi Iron Range, one of the four iron ranges in Minnesota's Arrowhead Region.

U.S. Highway 169 and State Highway 73 (MN 73) are two of Chisholm's main routes.

== Demographics ==
Historical population
Census	Pop.	Note	%±
1910	7,684		—
1920	9,039		17.6%
1930	8,308		−8.1%
1940	7,487		−9.9%
1950	6,861		−8.4%
1960	7,144		4.1%
1970	5,913		−17.2%
1980	5,930		0.3%
1990	5,290		−10.8%
2000	4,960		−6.2%
2010	4,976		0.3%
2020	4,775		−4.0%
U.S. Decennial Census; 2013 Estimate

=== 2020 census ===
As of the 2020 census, Chisholm had a population of 4,775. The median age was 41.4 years. 21.8% of residents were under the age of 18 and 21.2% of residents were 65 years of age or older. For every 100 females there were 103.6 males, and for every 100 females age 18 and over there were 102.2 males age 18 and over.

96.0% of residents lived in urban areas, while 4.0% lived in rural areas.

There were 2,116 households in Chisholm, of which 26.2% had children under the age of 18 living in them. Of all households, 37.0% were married-couple households, 26.1% were households with a male householder and no spouse or partner present, and 27.1% were households with a female householder and no spouse or partner present. About 37.5% of all households were made up of individuals and 15.9% had someone living alone who was 65 years of age or older.

There were 2,404 housing units, of which 12.0% were vacant. The homeowner vacancy rate was 2.1% and the rental vacancy rate was 13.1%.

Racial composition as of the 2020 census
Race	Number	Percent
White	4,335	90.8%
Black or African American	63	1.3%
American Indian and Alaska Native	58	1.2%
Asian	13	0.3%
Native Hawaiian and Other Pacific Islander	0	0.0%
Some other race	45	0.9%
Two or more races	261	5.5%
Hispanic or Latino (of any race)	111	2.3%

=== 2010 census ===
As of the census of 2010, there were 4,976 people, 2,257 households, and 1,260 families living in the city. The population density was 1,110.7 inhabitants per square mile (428.8/km^{2}). There were 2,524 housing units at an average density of 563.4 per square mile (217.5/km^{2}). The racial makeup of the city was 95.5% White, 0.8% African American, 1.1% Native American, 0.3% Asian, 0.1% from other races, and 2.2% from two or more races. Hispanic or Latino of any race were 1.4% of the population.

There were 2,256 households, of which 27.0% had children under the age of 18 living with them, 38.9% were married couples living together, 11.6% had a female householder with no husband present, 5.4% had a male householder with no wife present, and 44.1% were non-families. 39.0% of all households were made up of individuals, and 14.8% had someone living alone who was 65 years of age or older. The average household size was 2.15 and the average family size was 2.81.

The median age in the city was 40.7 years. 22.3% of residents were under the age of 18; 7.4% were between the ages of 18 and 24; 24.7% were from 25 to 44; 27.6% were from 45 to 64; and 18% were 65 years of age or older. The gender makeup of the city was 50.2% male and 49.8% female.

=== 2000 census ===
As of the 2000 census, there were 4,960 people, 2,178 households, and 1,287 families living in the city. The population density was 1,129 inhabitants per square mile (436/km^{2}). There were 2,375 housing units at an average density of 540 per square mile (210/km^{2}). The racial makeup of the city was 97.9% White, 0.1% African American, 0.6% Native American, 0.3% Asian, 0.1% from other races, less than one percent Pacific Islander, and 1% from two or more races. Hispanic or Latino of any race were 0.7% of the population. (Percentages may not add to exactly 100 due to rounding.) 12.8% were of Finnish, 11.9% German, 9.9% Slovene, 8.5% Italian, 8.4% Norwegian, 6.4% Irish and 5.8% French ancestry.

There were 2,178 households, out of which 28% had children under the age of 18 living with them, 44% were married couples living together, 11% had a female householder with no husband present, and 41% were non-families. 37% of all households were made up of individuals, and 20% had someone living alone who was 65 years of age or older. The average household size was 2.2 and the average family size was 2.9.

In the city, the population was spread out, with 22% under the age of 18, 8% from 18 to 24, 25% from 25 to 44, 23% from 45 to 64, and 22% who were 65 years of age or older. The median age was 42 years. For every 100 females, there were 92 males. For every 100 females age 18 and over, there were 87 males.

The median income for a household in the city was $28,472, and the median income for a family was $40,431. Males had a median income of $35,972 versus $21,406 for females. The per capita income for the city was $16,204. About 6% of families and 12% of the population were below the poverty line, including 14% of those under age 18 and 11% of those age 65 or over.

== Education ==
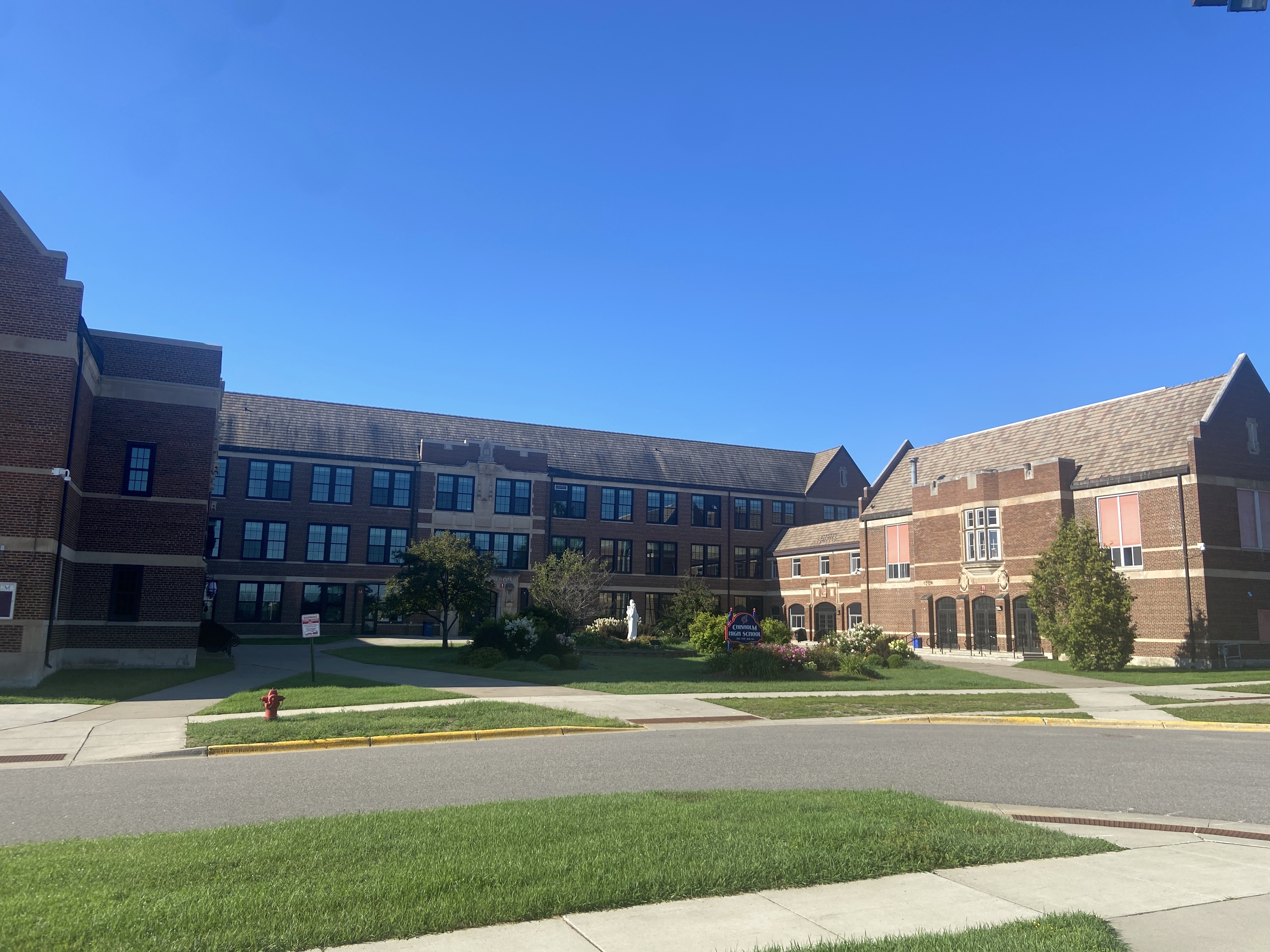
Chisholm High School

The Chisholm Independent School District draws students from Chisholm and surrounding Balkan Township. Vaughan–Steffensrud Elementary School (named for the first two superintendents of the Chisholm school system) has classes for children from preschool through third grade, Chisholm Elementary School has students in grades 4 through 6, and Chisholm High School has grades 7 through 12.

== Notable people ==
- John Blatnik, U.S. Congressman
- Roger Enrico, CEO of PepsiCo
- Philip Falcone, billionaire Wall Street investor
- Ann Govednik, Olympic breaststroke swimmer
- Archibald "Moonlight" Graham, former Major League Baseball player, town doctor
- Patty Hajdu, Canadian politician
- Ben Hoberman, pioneer of the all-talk radio format
- Richard Kelly, Minnesota state legislator and politician
- Cameron Latu, NFL tight end
- Joel Maturi, University of Minnesota athletic director
- Jim Oberstar, U.S. Congressman
- Dan Orlich, NFL defensive end
- Veda Ponikvar (1919–2015), newspaper publisher
- Shawn Rojeski, 2006 Winter Olympics men's curling bronze medalist
- Tony Sertich, Minnesota politician and House majority leader
- John Shuster, 2018 Winter Olympics men's curling gold medalist
- Jason Smith, 2010 Winter Olympics men's curler
- David Tomassoni, Olympic and professional hockey player and Minnesota state legislator

== In popular culture ==
- In the movie Field of Dreams, Ray Kinsella and Terence Mann go to Chisholm to find Archibald "Moonlight" Graham, or "Doc" Graham, as Chisholm residents called him, who worked as a doctor in Chisholm for 50 years after his baseball career. The scenes depicting the town were filmed in Galena, Illinois.
- Scenes of the drama film North Country (2005) were filmed in Chisholm.
- Several scenes of the independent drama film Cash for Gold (2024) were filmed on Lake Street in Chisholm.
