= Matt Dean =

American politician (born 1966)

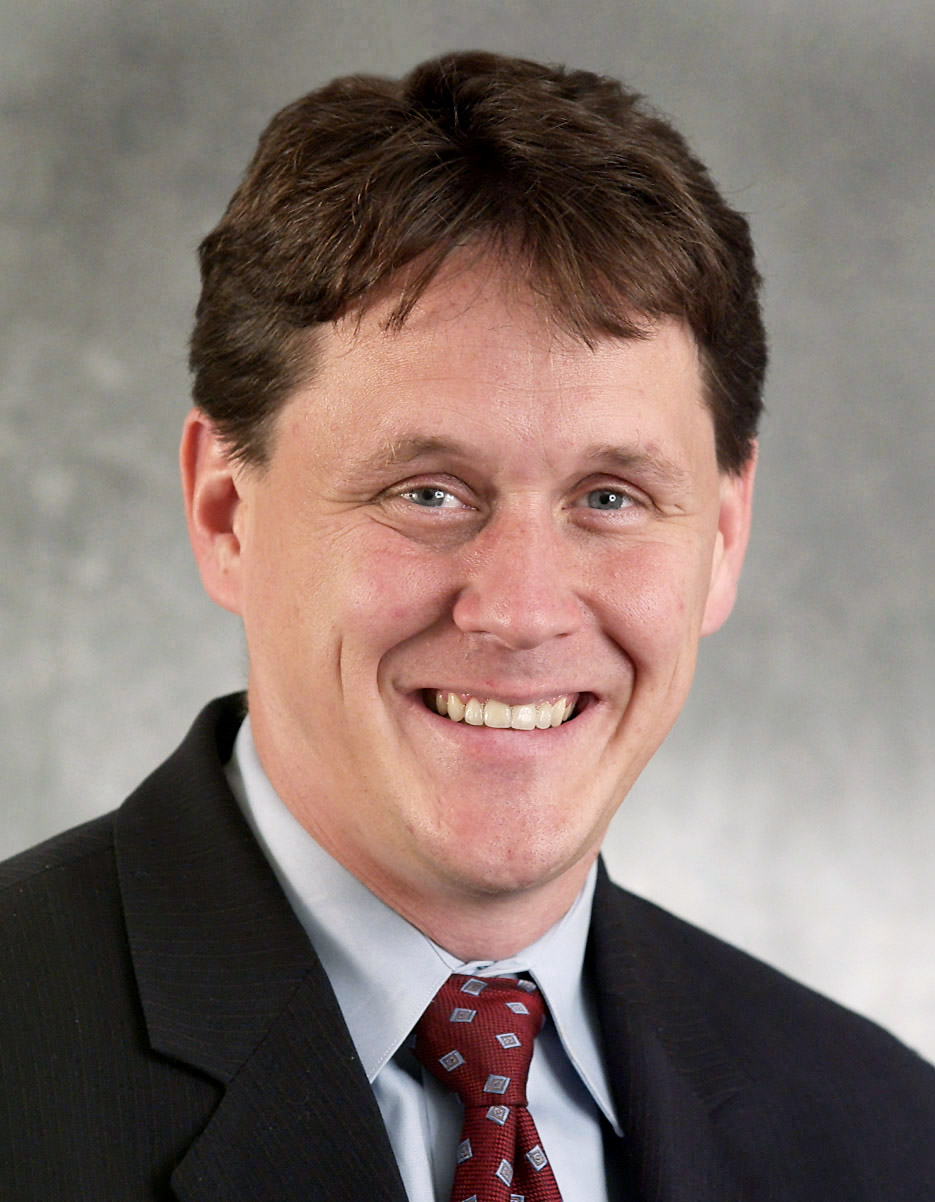

Majority Leader of the Minnesota House of Representatives
- In office January 4, 2011 – January 7, 2013
- Preceded by: Tony Sertich
- Succeeded by: Erin Murphy

Member of the Minnesota House of Representatives from the 38B district 52B (2005–2013)
- In office January 4, 2005 – January 7, 2019
- Preceded by: Rebecca Otto
- Succeeded by: Ami Wazlawik

Personal details
- Born: April 15, 1966 (age 60) Ely, Minnesota, U.S.
- Party: Republican
- Spouse: Laura Anne Dean
- Education: University of Minnesota, Twin Cities

Matthew T. "Matt" Dean (born April 15, 1966) is an American politician. He served as the Majority Leader of the Minnesota House of Representatives from 2011 to 2013. A member of the Republican Party of Minnesota, he represented District 38B, which included portions of Ramsey and Washington counties in the eastern Twin Cities metropolitan area. He is an architect and the owner of Dean Architects in Dellwood.

== Early life and education ==
Born in the northeastern Minnesota city of Ely, Dean was raised in the Twin Cities suburb of Roseville. He graduated from the University of Minnesota in Minneapolis with a Bachelor of Architecture degree. Dean competed in track and cross country in high school and college.

== Minnesota House of Representatives ==
Dean was first elected in 2004, and was reelected in 2006, 2008, 2010, and 2012. He served as the Majority Leader of the Minnesota House of Representatives from 2011 to 2013, having been selected by his caucus for the position on November 6, 2010. Dean was the chair of the Health and Human Services Finance Committee. He was also considered a leader of the conservative wing of House Republicans.

Dean briefly campaigned for the Republican nomination for Governor in 2018 before dropping out in January of that year, citing the desire to unify the party around one candidate. He declined to run for reelection to his seat in the Minnesota House of Representatives.

== Electoral history ==
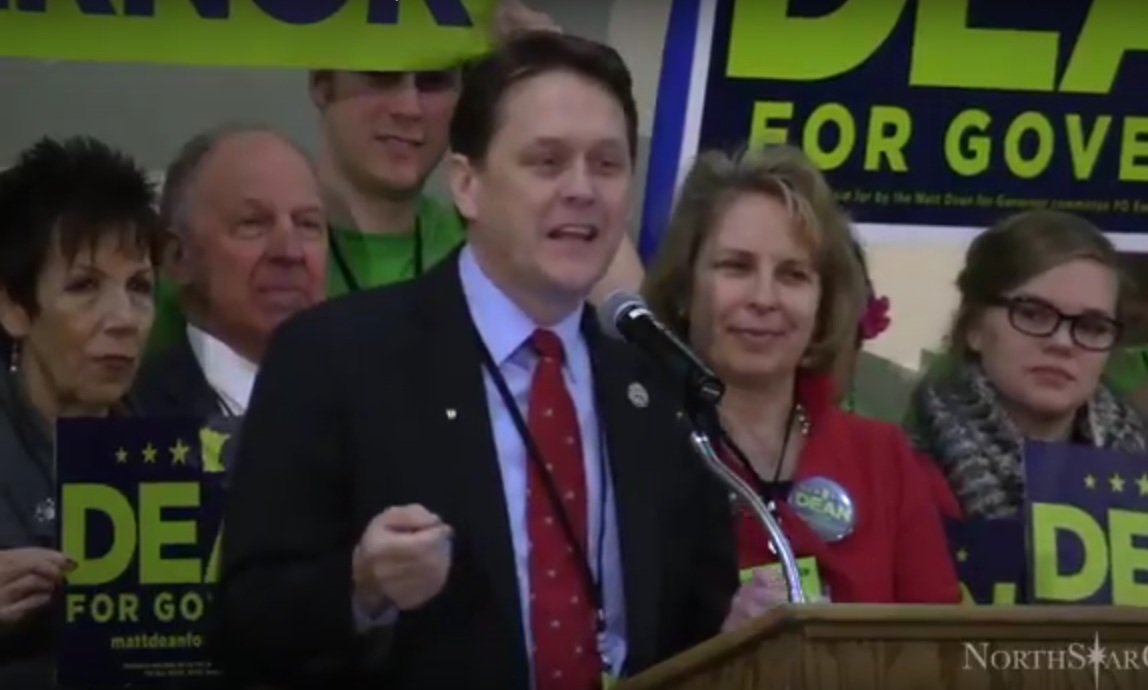
Dean campaigning during his 2018 gubernatorial run

- 2016 MN State House Seat 38B
  - Matt Dean (R, Incumbent) 56.94%
  - Ami Wazlawik (DFL) 42.95%
- 2014 MN State House Seat 38B
  - Matt Dean (R, Incumbent) 56.07%
  - Greg Pariseau (DFL) 43.80%
- 2012 MN State House Seat 38B
  - Matt Dean (R, Incumbent) 52.30%
  - Greg Pariseau (DFL) 47.54%
- 2010 MN State House Seat 52B
  - Matt Dean (R, Incumbent) 60.51%
  - Sten Hakanson (DFL) 39.46%
- 2008 MN State House Seat 52B
  - Matt Dean (R, Incumbent) 55.6%
  - Kate Christopher (DFL) 44.3%
- 2006 MN State House Seat 52B
  - Matt Dean (R, incumbent), 51.85%
  - Jason Gonnion (DFL), 48.11%
- 2004 MN State House Seat 52B
  - Matt Dean (R), 51.59%
  - Rebecca Otto (DFL, incumbent), 48.32%
- 2003 MN State House Seat 52B (Special Election)
  - Rebecca Otto (DFL), 54.30%
  - Matt Dean (GOP), 43.47%

== Interaction with Neil Gaiman ==
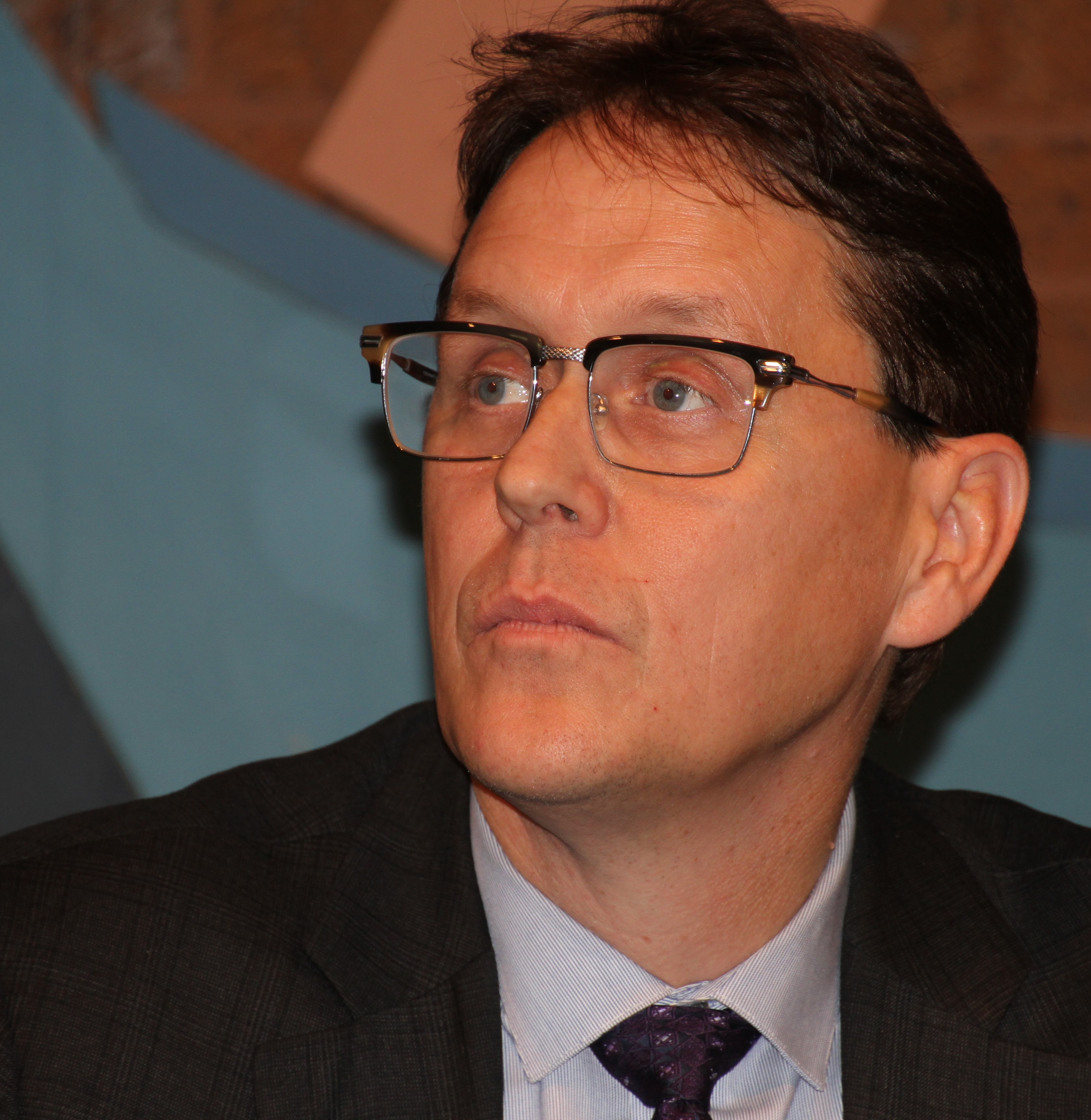
Dean in 2017

In May 2011, author Neil Gaiman was invited to speak at the Stillwater Library in Minnesota. Gaiman has a fixed policy of charging very high speaking fees for his appearances, believing that such fees will discourage most people from requesting he speak, leaving him more time for writing. Gaiman's fee was taken from a special fund established to bring authors in to speak at local libraries. Dean took issue with the expenditure, saying that Gaiman was an author he hated, and describing him as a "pencil-necked little weasel who stole $45,000 from the state of Minnesota." The actual fee was $40,000. Gaiman pointed out that he had donated his speaking fee to charity long before Dean's comments.

After some press coverage, at his mother's urging, Dean apologized for being a "name caller".

Minnesota House of Representatives
Preceded by Rebecca Otto	Member of the Minnesota House of Representatives from the 38B district 52B (2005–2013); 2005–2019	Succeeded by Ami Wazlawik
Preceded by Tony Sertich	Majority Leader of the Minnesota House of Representatives; 2011–2013	Succeeded by Erin Murphy
