= 2006 Minnesota State Auditor election =

- November 7, 2006
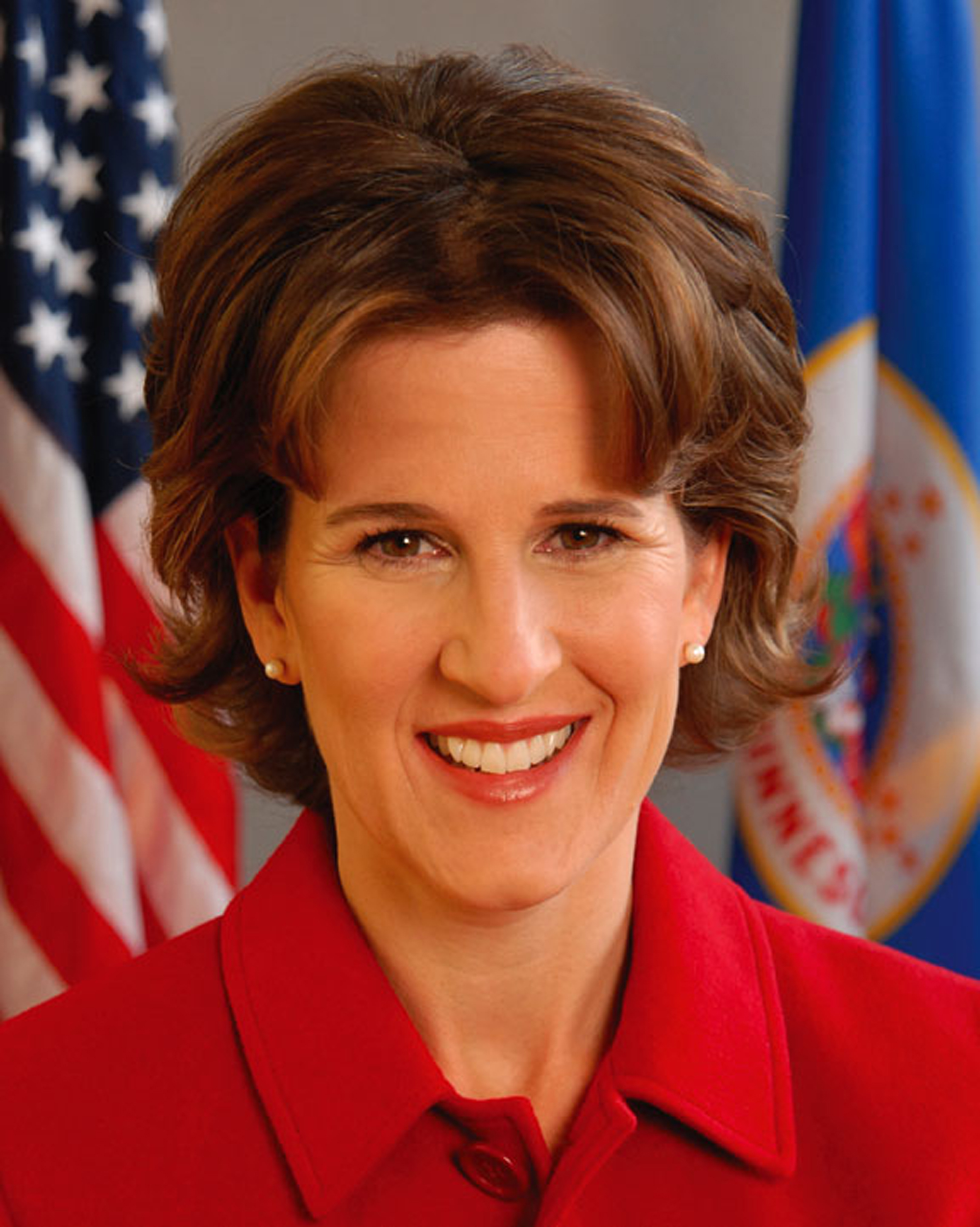

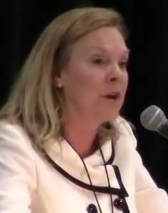
| Nominee | Rebecca Otto | Patricia Anderson |
| Party | Democratic (DFL) | Republican |
| Popular vote | 1,094,440 | 866,041 |
| Percentage | 51.92% | 41.08% |
- Otto: 40–50% 50–60% 60–70% 70–80% 80–90% >90% Anderson: 40–50% 50–60% 60–70% 70–80% 80–90% >90% Gerold: >90% Tie: 30–40% 40–50% 50% No votes
State Auditor before election
Patricia Anderson
Republican
Elected State Auditor
Rebecca Otto
Democratic (DFL)

The 2006 Minnesota State Auditor election was held on November 7, 2006. Incumbent Republican Patricia Anderson was defeated by former State Representative Rebecca Otto of the Minnesota Democratic–Farmer–Labor Party (DFL). Independence Party of Minnesota candidate Lucy Gerold finished third.

== Candidates ==
- Republican: Incumbent Patricia Anderson
- Democratic–Farmer–Labor: Former State Representative Rebecca Otto
- Independence: Lucy Gerold
- Green: Dave Berger

== Results ==
The election was not close, with Otto taking 56 of the state's 87 counties and winning by a margin of 10.84%. Otto performed well in Hennepin County, home of Minneapolis, the most populous county in the state. She also performed well in Ramsey County, of the state capital St. Paul. Otto also fared well in the Minneapolis suburbs. Anderson did win some rural areas of the state. Since this election, this office has remained in Democratic hands.

| Candidate | Party | Votes | |
| Candidate | Party | # | % |
|---|---|---|---|
| Rebecca Otto | Democratic–Farmer–Labor | 1,094,440 | 51.92 |
| Patricia Anderson (incumbent) | Republican | 866,041 | 41.08 |
| Lucy Gerold | Independence | 97,076 | 4.61 |
| Dave Berger | Green | 49,131 | 2.33 |
| Write-in | — | 1,316 | 0.06 |
| Total | | 2,108,004 | 100.00 |
| Valid votes | | 2,108,004 | 95.05 |
| Blank votes | | 109,814 | 4.95 |
| Turnout | | 2,217,818 | 60.47 |
| Eligible voters | | 3,667,707 | |

Source: Minnesota Secretary of State
