= Ami Wazlawik =

American politician

Member of the Minnesota House of Representatives from the 38B district
- In office January 8, 2019 – January 3, 2023
- Preceded by: Matt Dean
- Succeeded by: Elliott Engen (District 36A)

Personal details
- Born: 1985 or 1986 (age 39–40)
- Party: Democratic–Farmer–Labor
- Education: St. Olaf College; University of Minnesota

Ami Wazlawik (born 1985/1986) is an American politician and former member of the Minnesota House of Representatives. A member of the Minnesota Democratic–Farmer–Labor Party (DFL), she represented District 38B in the northeastern Twin Cities metropolitan area.

== Early life, education, and career ==
Wazlawik graduated from White Bear Lake Area High School. She attended St. Olaf College, studying psychology, and the University of Minnesota, graduating with a Bachelor of Arts in psychology and a master's degree in public policy from the Humphrey School of Public Affairs.

== Minnesota House of Representatives ==
Wazlawik was elected to the Minnesota House of Representatives in 2018 and narrowly reelected in 2020. She chose not to run for reelection in 2022.

== Personal life ==
Wazlawik lives in White Bear Township, Minnesota.
