= Richard Kelly (Minnesota politician) =

American politician and businessman

Richard Kelly (October 19, 1908 – November 23, 1939) was an American politician and businessman.

Kelly was born in Proctor, Minnesota. He moved to Chisholm, Minnesota in 1914 and graduated from Chisholm High School in 1927. Kelly was the business manager for the Chisholm Tribune-Herald newspaper. He served on the Chisholm School Board from 1934 to 1937. Kelly served in the Minnesota House of Representatives in 1937 and 1938. He then served in the Minnesota Senate in 1939 and then died from pneumonia while still in office.
