= Rebecca Otto =

American politician (born 1963)

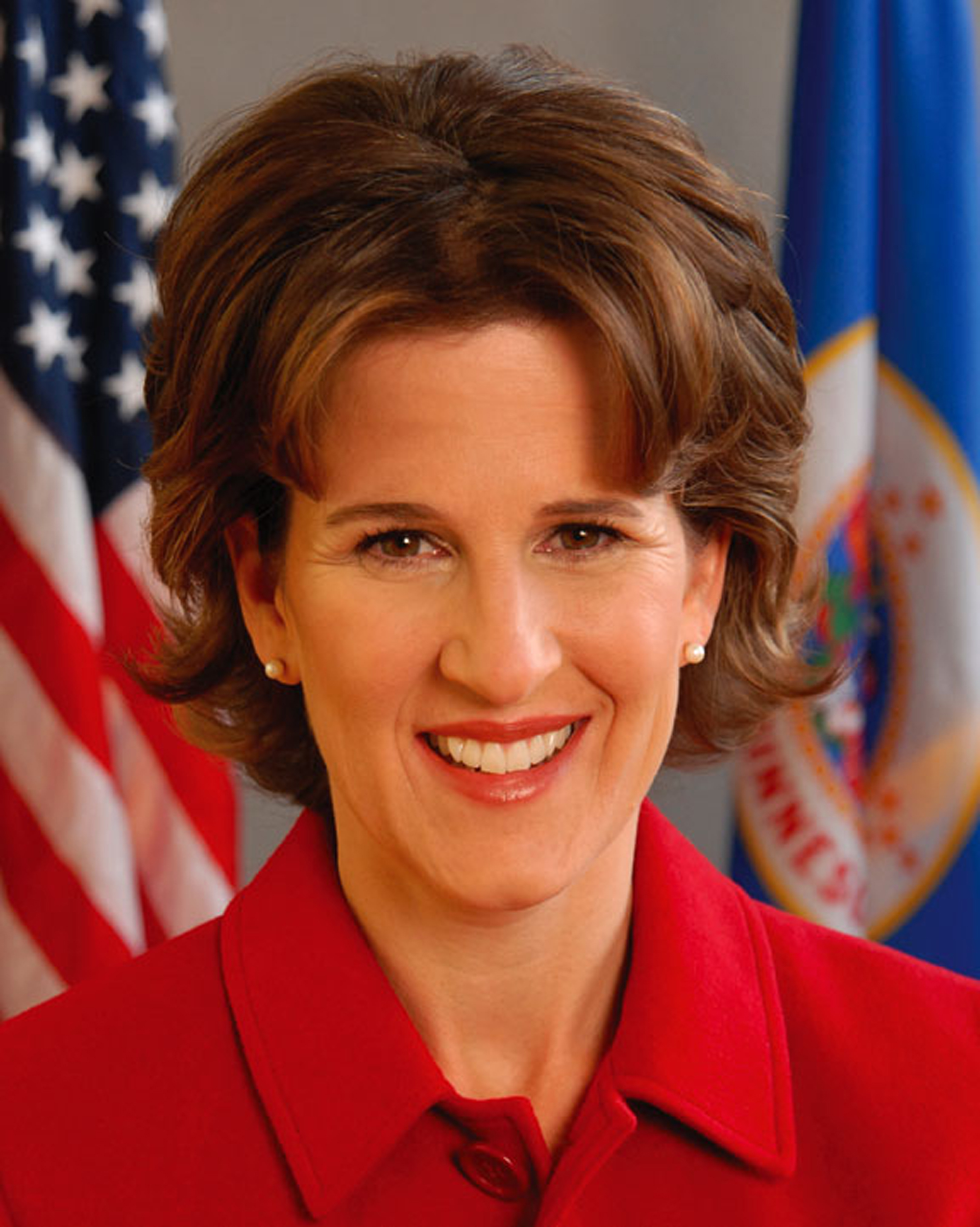
- Otto in 2008

18th Auditor of Minnesota
- In office January 2, 2007 – January 7, 2019
- Governor: Tim Pawlenty; Mark Dayton
- Preceded by: Patricia Anderson
- Succeeded by: Julie Blaha

Member of the Minnesota House of Representatives from the 52B district
- In office January 2003 – January 2005
- Preceded by: Mark Holsten
- Succeeded by: Matt Dean

Personal details
- Born: July 9, 1963 (age 63) San Diego, California, U.S.
- Party: Democratic
- Spouse: Shawn Otto
- Education: Macalester College (BS); University of Minnesota (MEd)

Rebecca Otto (born July 9, 1963) is an American politician who served as State Auditor of Minnesota from 2007 to 2019. Affiliated with the Minnesota Democratic-Farmer-Labor Party (DFL), she served in the Minnesota House of Representatives from 2003 to 2005 and on the Forest Lake School Board.

Before entering politics, Otto was a science teacher and a business owner. She lives on a farm near Marine on St. Croix with her husband, Shawn Lawrence Otto, a screenwriter, novelist, and science advocate. She is the third woman to serve as State Auditor, the first female Democrat to be elected to the post, the first Democrat ever to be reelected, and the first woman to be elected to a third term. In 2013 she became president of the National State Auditors Association and in 2014 was named one of 15 Most Influential Professionals in Government Auditing.

== Political career ==
Otto led a successful school levy campaign in Forest Lake, and then was elected to the Forest Lake School Board. In her first race for the Minnesota State House in 2002, she was defeated by incumbent Mark Holsten. The seat then became vacant after Governor Tim Pawlenty appointed Holsten as Deputy Commissioner of the Minnesota Department of Natural Resources. A special election was held, which Otto won, defeating Republican nominee Matt Dean.

In 2003, Otto and her husband, Shawn Lawrence Otto, were indicted by a grand jury on charges of knowingly distributing false campaign material, a misdemeanor. Otto said the charges, derived from a complaint filed by Republican House Speaker Steve Sviggum, were politically motivated and baseless. Her supporters included former Republican Governor Arne Carlson, who signed a letter criticizing the indictment as politically motivated and raised money for her defense. In December 2003, the presiding judge dismissed the charges and struck down the campaign finance law being used in the prosecution as unconstitutional.

In 2004 Otto lost her reelection bid to Matt Dean.

In March 2005 Otto declared her candidacy for State Auditor. She won the DFL endorsement to run against Republican incumbent Patricia Anderson. After discovering hundreds of millions of dollars in errors made by Anderson, Otto won the 2006 general election by the largest margin of victory over an incumbent in 112 years. Governor Carlson supported Otto's candidacy, as did two other former state auditors, Mark Dayton and Judi Dutcher. In 2010, Otto was reelected to a second term in a rematch against Anderson by 25,483 votes. In 2014 she was elected to a third term, defeating Matt Entenza in the DFL primary, 81%-19%, and winning the November general election with 52% of the vote.

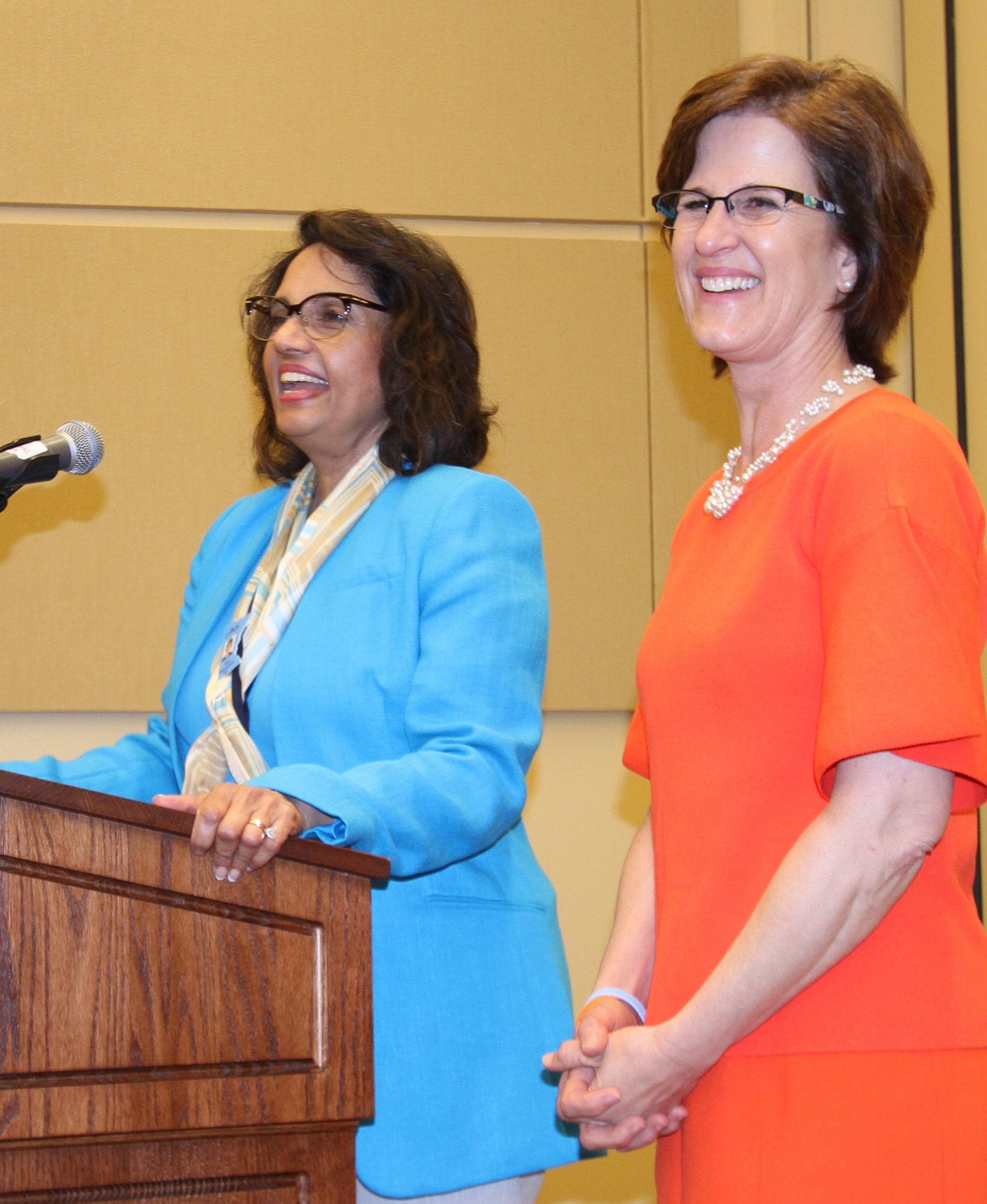
Otto (right) at the 2018 DFL convention with running mate Zarina Baber

In January 2017, Otto announced her intention to seek the DFL nomination in the 2018 election for Governor of Minnesota. Her candidacy attracted international attention for its carbon fee and dividend policy to mitigate global warming. In May 2018, Otto chose running mate Zarina Baber, an IT professional. At the June 2018 state DFL convention, Otto did not receive the party's endorsement. The following Monday Otto announced she would honor her commitment to withdraw from the race without the endorsement.

== Awards and honors ==
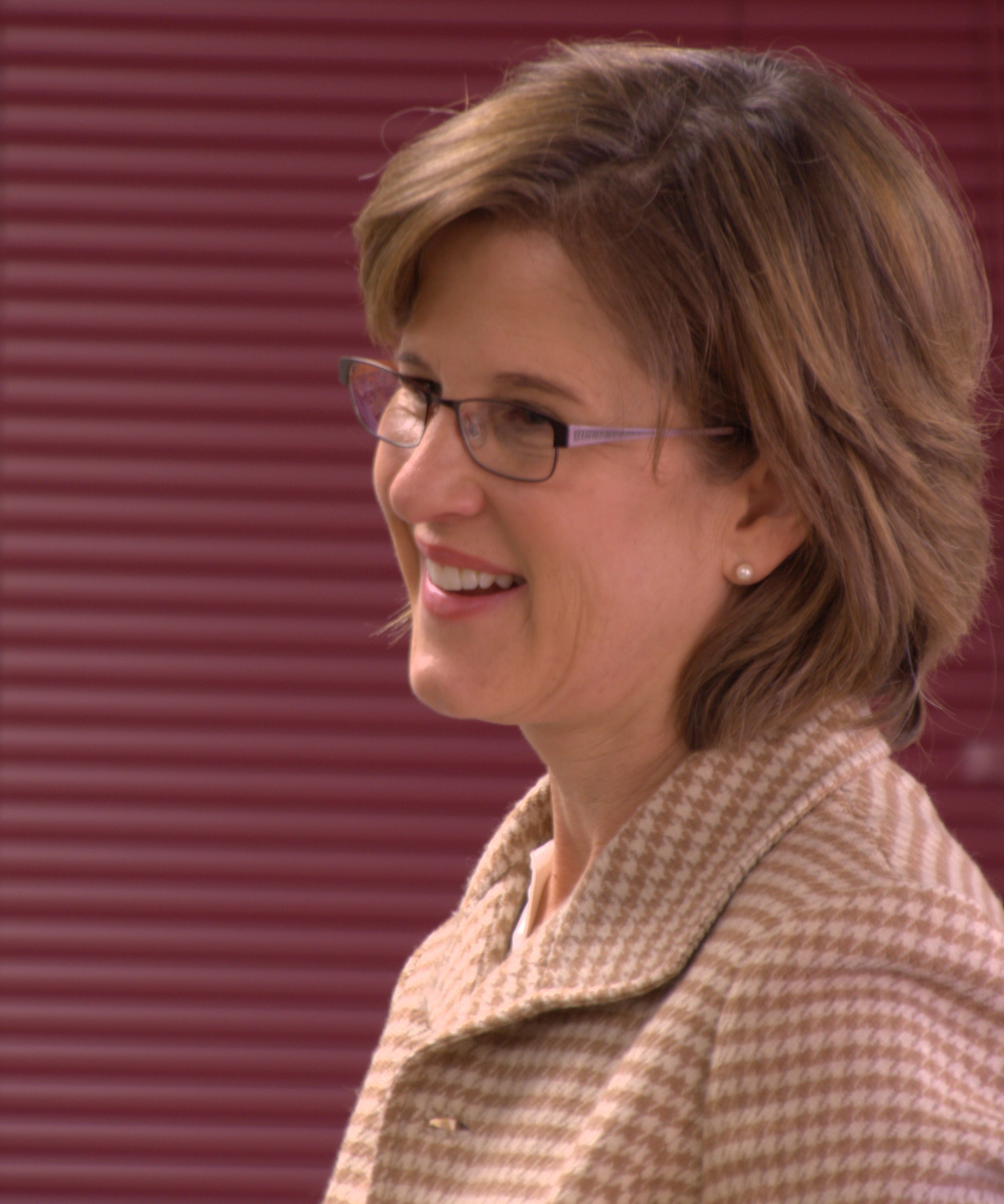
Otto in 2017

- 2017 Received the William R Snodgrass Leadership Award, the highest award in state government auditing, from the National Association of State Auditors, Comptrollers, and Treasurers (NASACT). Award winners must have exhibited long-term leadership in a state auditing environment; distinctive leadership and notable accomplishment in state government auditing; innovative thinking and/or creative development of improvements in state government audit programs or techniques; and, recognized leadership and professionalism at the state level.
- 2014 Named one of 15 Most Influential Professionals in Government Auditing by the Institute of Internal Auditors, the 180,000-member international auditing professional organization. In naming her the group cited the "courage, integrity, and leadership necessary to confront and overcome political and public pressures."
- 2014 recipient of the President’s Award from the National Association of State Auditors, Comptrollers and Treasurers (NASACT). "State Auditor Otto was honored with the award to recognize her national leadership and her efforts to improve government operations as one of NASACT’s representatives on the national Alliance to Transform State Government Operations (Alliance)."
- 2013 Elected by her nonpartisan peers to be President of the National State Auditors Association.
- 2010 Received the Distinguished Service Award from the Minnesota State Fire Chiefs Association, for her work overhauling state fire laws. Otto is the sixth person and first Constitutional Officer to receive the group's high honor.
- 2009 Honoree of the National Women's History Month, alongside Hillary Clinton, Sally Ride, Jane Goodall, and other "Women taking the lead to save our planet," the 2009 theme, for her environmental leadership.
- 2009 Recipient of the National State Auditors Association "Excellence in Accountability Award" for her special project "Best Practices Review: Reducing Energy Costs in Local Government"

== Electoral history ==
- 2014 MN State Auditor
  - Rebecca Otto (DFL) (inc.), 52%
  - Randy Gilbert (R), 40%
  - Patrick Dean (IP), 4%
  - Keegan Iverson (L), 1%
  - Judith Schwartzbacker (GR), 3%
- 2014 MN State Auditor DFL Primary
  - Rebecca Otto (DFL) (inc.), 81%
  - Matt Entenza (DFL), 19%
- 2010 MN State Auditor
  - Rebecca Otto (DFL) (inc.), 48.39%
  - Patricia Anderson (R), 47.13%
  - Annie Young (G), 2.67%
  - Kenny Kalligher (GR), 1.75%
- 2006 MN State Auditor
  - Rebecca Otto (DFL), 52%
  - Patricia Anderson (R) (inc.), 41%
  - Lucy Gerold (IP), 5%
  - Dave Berger (G), 2%
- 2004 MN State House Seat 52B
  - Matt Dean (R), 51.59%
  - Rebecca Otto (DFL) (inc.), 48.32%
- 2003 MN State House Seat 52B (Special Election)
  - Rebecca Otto (DFL), 54.30%
  - Matt Dean (R), 43.47%
- 2002 MN State House Seat 52B
  - Mark Holsten (R) (inc.), 58.75%
  - Rebecca Otto (DFL), 41.17%

Party political offices
Preceded by Carol C. Johnson	Democratic nominee for Auditor of Minnesota; 2006, 2010, 2014	Succeeded by Julie Blaha
Political offices
Preceded by Patricia Anderson	Auditor of Minnesota; 2007–2019	Succeeded by Julie Blaha
