= Iron Range Resources and Rehabilitation Board =

The Minnesota Department of Iron Range Resources and Rehabilitation (IRRRB) is an economic development agency of the State of Minnesota, designed to advance growth on Minnesota's Iron Range. Founded in 1941, the board is tasked with using proceeds from taconite mining to spur broader development in the region. Mining companies pay taxes on production of taconite to local governments units including cities, school districts, and the IRRRB instead of paying property taxes. The board was created with the goal to help the Iron Range weather the boom and bust cycle of mining in the region.

The mission of IRRRB is to "invest in resources to foster vibrant growth and economic prosperity in northeastern Minnesota by enhancing livable communities, maximizing collaborations and partnerships and strengthen businesses and worker education. The agency provides vital funding, including low or no interest loans and grants for businesses relocating or expanding in the region. Additionally, a variety of grants are available to local units of government, education institutions, and nonprofits that promote workforce development and sustainable communities." The budget for the organization was $67.8 million for 2024.

The board's commissioner is appointed by the sitting governor and serves as a member of the governor's cabinet. The current commissioner is Ida Rukavina. Ida Rukavina is the daughter of former Minnesota legislator Tom Rukavina. The IRRR Advisory Board consists of the state senators and representatives elected from districts in which one-third or more of the residents reside within the taconite assistance area. The board is headquartered in Eveleth, Minnesota.
