= 2010 Minnesota State Auditor election =

- November 2, 2010
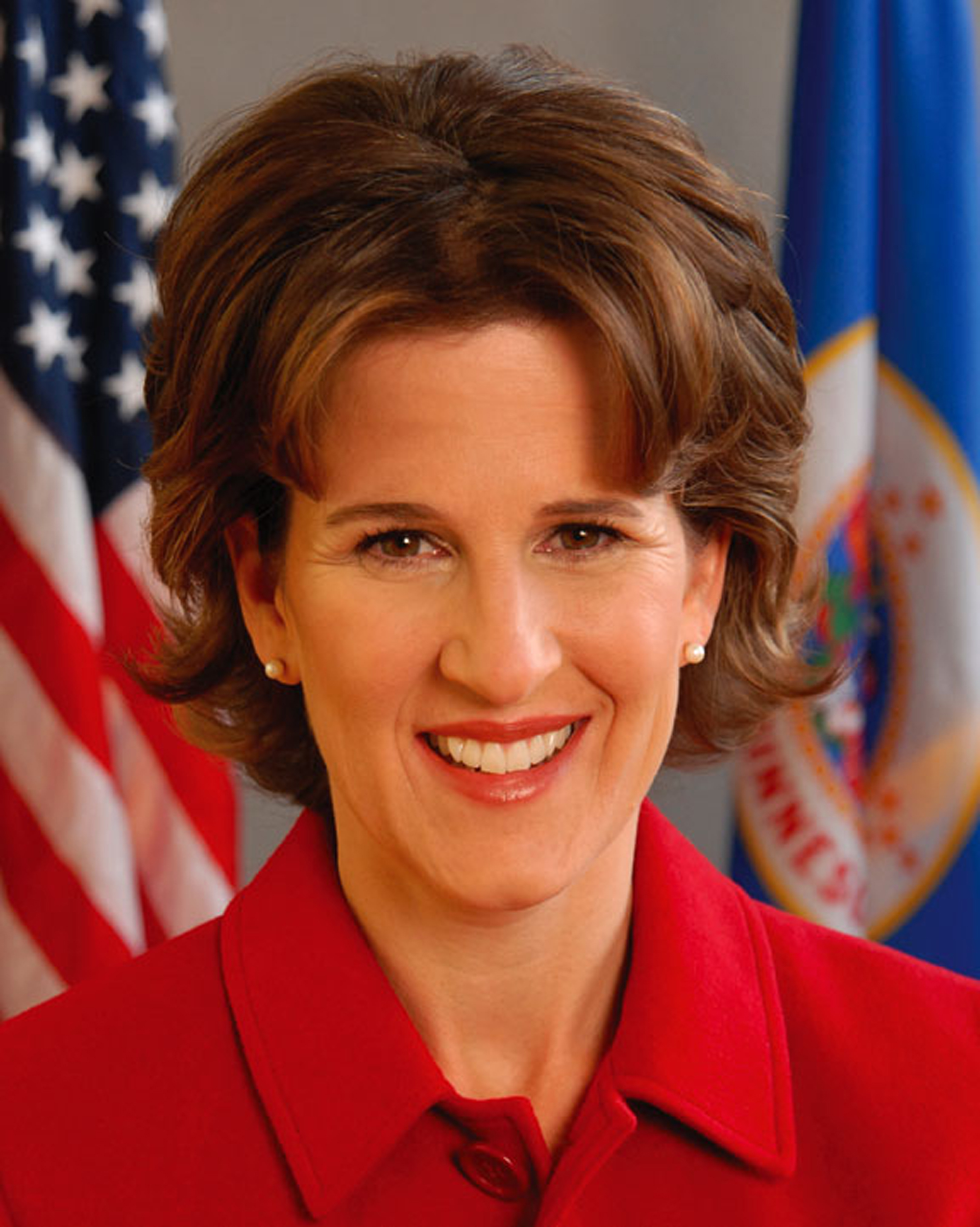

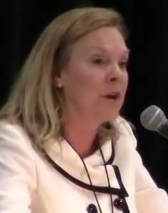
Nominee	Rebecca Otto	Patricia Anderson
Party	Democratic (DFL)	Republican
Popular vote	981,822	956,339
Percentage	48.39%	47.13%
- Otto: 40–50% 50–60% 60–70% 70–80% 80–90% >90% Anderson: 30–40% 40–50% 50–60% 60–70% 70–80% 80–90% >90% Tie: 40–50% 50% No votes
State Auditor before election
Rebecca Otto
Democratic (DFL)
Elected State Auditor
Rebecca Otto
Democratic (DFL)

The 2010 Minnesota State Auditor election was held on Tuesday, November 2, 2010 to elect the Minnesota State Auditor for a four-year term. Incumbent Rebecca Otto of the Minnesota Democratic–Farmer–Labor Party (DFL) was narrowly re-elected to a second term.

== Candidates ==
=== Democratic–Farmer–Labor Party ===
Incumbent Rebecca Otto won endorsement at the Minnesota Democratic–Farmer–Labor Party (DFL) convention.

=== Republican Party ===
Former State Auditor Patricia Anderson earned the endorsement of the Republican Party of Minnesota at its state convention.

=== Green Party ===
Minneapolis Park and Recreation Board member Annie Young ran as the Green Party candidate.

=== Grassroots Party ===
Kenny Kalligher stood for election for the Grassroots Party.

== Results ==
Candidate	Party	Votes	
Candidate	Party	#	%
Rebecca Otto (incumbent)	Democratic–Farmer–Labor	981,822	48.39
Patricia Anderson	Republican	956,339	47.13
Annie Young	Green	54,154	2.67
Kenny Kalligher	Grassroots	35,548	1.75
Write-in	—	1,224	0.06
Total		2,029,087	100.00
Valid votes		2,029,087	95.56
Blank votes		94,282	4.44
Turnout		2,123,369	55.81
Eligible voters		3,804,746	

Source: Minnesota Secretary of State
