= Minnesota State Auditor =

Constitutional officer of Minnesota, United States

State Auditor of Minnesota
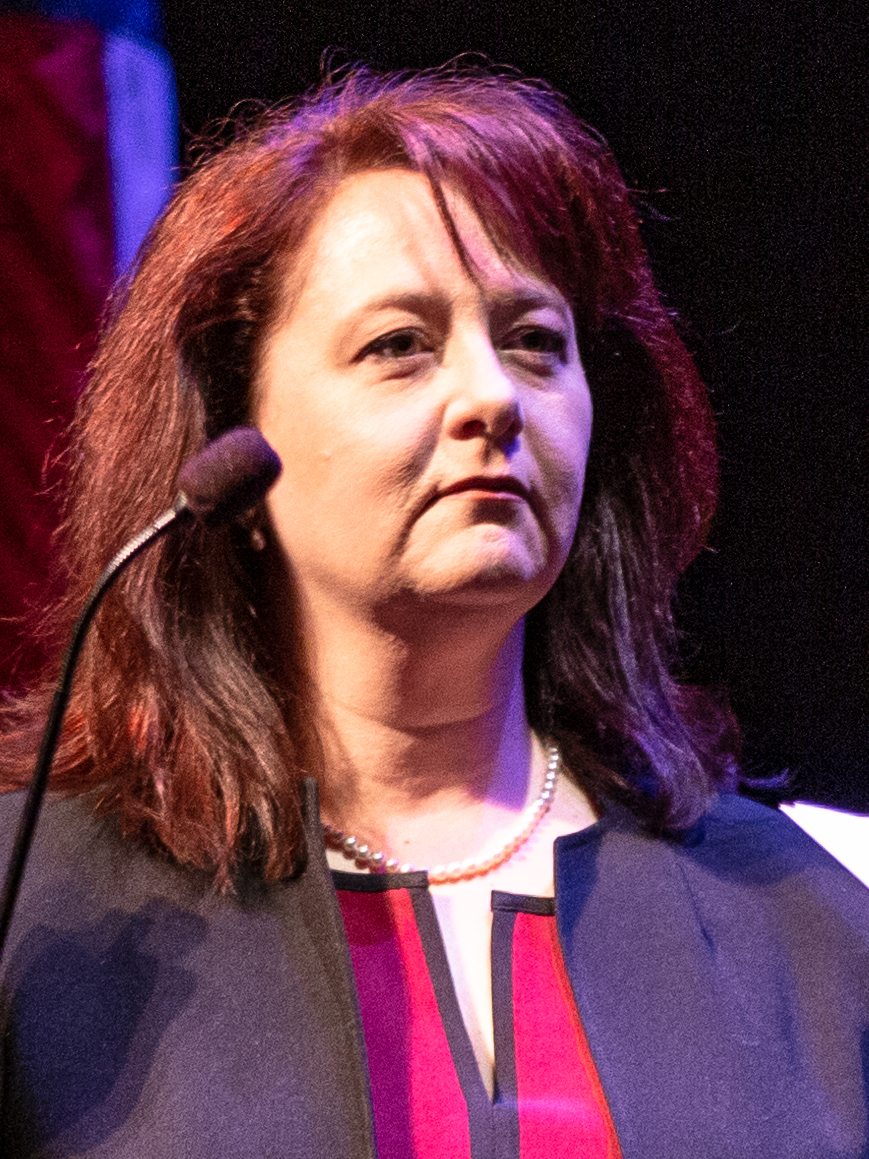
- Incumbent; Julie Blaha since January 7, 2019
- Style: Mister or Madam Auditor (informal); The Honorable (formal)
- Member of: Executive Council, among others
- Seat: Minnesota State Capitol; Saint Paul, Minnesota
- Appointer: General election
- Term length: Four years, no term limits
- Constituting instrument: Minnesota Constitution of 1858, Article V
- Inaugural holder: William F. Dunbar
- Formation: May 11, 1858 (168 years ago)
- Succession: Fifth
- Salary: US$137,358
- Website: Official page

The state auditor of Minnesota is a constitutional officer in the executive branch of the U.S. state of Minnesota. Nineteen individuals have held the office of state auditor since statehood. The incumbent is Julie Blaha, a member of the Minnesota Democratic–Farmer–Labor Party.

== Election and term of office ==
The state auditor is elected by the people on Election Day in November, and takes office on the first Monday of the next January. There is no limit to the number of terms a state auditor may hold. To be elected state auditor, a person must be qualified voter, permanently resident in the state of Minnesota at least 30 days prior to the election, and at least 21 years of age.

In the event of a vacancy in the office of the state auditor, the governor may appoint a successor to serve the balance of the term. The state auditor may also be recalled by the voters or removed from office through an impeachment trial.

== Powers and duties ==
In Minnesota, the state auditor does not audit state agencies, investigate financial misconduct in state programs, or prosecute welfare fraud. These responsibilities instead belong to the legislative auditor, the inspector general, and the attorney general, respectively. Rather, the state auditor is charged with supervising and auditing the finances of the state's approximately 4,500 local governments, which altogether tax and spend over $56 billion annually. (Note: By comparison, the state of Minnesota collected only $38.659 billion in tax revenue in FY 2026, with the remainder of the state budget consisting of federal grants, departmental earnings, investment income, and all other enterprise revenues (i.e., asset sales, bond proceeds, and user fees for services rendered). Most government taxation and expenditure in Minnesota therefore occurs at the local level. See "Current Estimates of State Budget". Minnesota Management and Budget.) The state auditor's authority transcends jurisdictions and applies to all localities in Minnesota, be they counties, cities, townships, school districts, charter schools, local pension plans, or myriad special purpose districts. (Note: Aside from 643 volunteer firefighter relief associations, Minnesota has two other types of local pension systems: three locally administered paid firefighter plans in Bloomington, Minneapolis, and Virginia, and the Saint Paul Teachers' Retirement Fund Association.) (Note: Minnesota's special purpose districts include airport authorities, area ambulance districts, area redevelopment agencies, the Croft Historical Park District, the Duluth Transit Authority, the East Lake Clinic District, economic development authorities, educational service agencies, hospital districts, housing and redevelopment authorities, joint cable communication commissions, joint powers airport boards, joint powers boards, mental health collaboratives, the Metropolitan Airports Commission, the Metropolitan Council, the Metropolitan Mosquito Control District, the Minneapolis-Saint Paul Housing Finance Board, the Morrison County Rural Development Financing Authority, municipal gas agencies, municipal power agencies, park districts, regional development commissions, regional public library districts, regional public library systems, regional railroad authorities, rural development financing authorities, rural water user districts, the Saint Cloud Metropolitan Transit Commission, sanitary districts, soil and water conservation districts, solid waste management districts, watershed districts, and watershed management organizations. Another 1,600 tax increment financing (TIF) districts, which are component units of economic development authorities, housing and redevelopment authorities, or port authorities, also come under the state auditor's oversight.) In addition, the state auditor performs under contract the annual single audit of federal programs administered by state agencies and their subrecipients (i.e., localities and nonprofits), which accounts for another $20 billion of public spending. Public expenditures overseen by the state auditor - whether local or federal funds - thus exceed standalone state spending.

In keeping with this position of trust, the state auditor renders opinions on the presentation of governments' financial statements and their overall fiscal health, examines compliance over financial management with internal controls, conducts best practices reviews of locally delivered public services, reviews audit reports prepared by private accounting firms, and investigates complaints of waste, fraud, or abuse of public funds and resources. (Note: A best practices review is a type of performance audit under Government Auditing Standards with program effectiveness and results (i.e., program evaluation) objectives.) (Note: All audits, examinations, and reviews are performed in accordance with Government Auditing Standards promulgated by the Comptroller General of the United States.) In addition, the state auditor prescribes uniform systems of accounting and budgeting applicable to all local governments, collects and analyses local government financial data, and provides training opportunities to local government officials and employees on matters of public administration and financial management. The state auditor also issues annual statutory reports on matters of asset forfeiture, municipal lobbying, and the condition of local public finances. These reports inform the budgetary and fiscal policies of the governor and Legislature.

Aside from his or her functional responsibilities, the state auditor is by virtue of office a member of the following public bodies:

- Board of Trustees of the Public Employees Retirement Association: Administers Minnesota's public pension system for local government employees.
- Executive Council: Advises the management and budget commissioner on the issuance of state debt, selects depository institutions for the safekeeping of state funds, coordinates emergency management statewide, approves timber harvests from state forests, rents and sells state lands, and acts as leasing agent for the state with regard to dams, harbors, and mineral deposits.
- Housing Finance Agency Board: Finances housing for low- and moderate-income households and offers programs for buying, refinancing, or making improvements to one's home.
- Land Exchange Board: Approves the exchange of state lands with federal, local, or privately owned lands.
- Records Disposition Panel: Regulates the retention and destruction of public records across state and local government.
- Rural Finance Authority Board: Partners with local lenders to issue agricultural loans to Minnesota farmers.
- State Board of Investment: Directs and administers the investment of the state of Minnesota's $146 billion investment portfolio, including its general fund cash balances, college and ABLE savings plans, Permanent School Fund, and three public pension systems.

== History ==
The state auditor's office has its origins in the Minnesota Territory, when the territorial governor appointed an auditor to ensure that both territorial and county finances were in good order and handled properly. This function continued with an elected state auditor upon Minnesota's entry into the Union on May 11, 1858, and lasted until a 1973 reorganization of state government. During the intervening years, the state auditor acted as the comptroller for the whole of state government. In that capacity, the state auditor prescribed and maintained the statewide accounting system, preaudited claims by and against the state, issued warrants on the state treasury in payment of claims approved, monitored county finances, and managed the state's land records. Following reorganization, the responsibilities of the state auditor's office were transferred to a state agency known today as the Department of Management and Budget. The Office of the State Auditor then shifted to its present role, which was previously handled by the public examiner, a Cabinet official appointed by the governor that audited local governments and state agencies alike. Following elimination of the Department of the Public Examiner, the elected state auditor took on the duty of supervising and auditing local government finances. At the same time, audits and evaluations of state agency financial management and performance were reassigned to a newly created office of legislative auditor, which is appointed by and reports to the Legislative Audit Commission. Aside from the statewide single audit, which was transferred from the legislative auditor to the state auditor beginning in 2021, this division of auditing responsibility has remained constant since 1973.

=== Territorial auditors ===
| Name | Took office | Left office | Party |
|---|---|---|---|
| Jonathan E. McKusick | 1849 | 1852 | Whig |
| Abraham Van Vorhes | 1852 | 1853 | Whig |
| Socrates Nelson | 1853 | 1854 | Democratic |
| Julius Georgii | 1854 | 1858 | Democratic |

=== State auditors ===
The state auditor's term of office was originally three years. In 1883, voters approved a constitutional amendment changing it to four years.

| No. | Image | Name | Term of office | Party | Elected |
|---|---|---|---|---|---|
| 1 | | William F. Dunbar | 1858–1861 | Democratic | 1857 |
| 2 | | Charles McIlrath | 1861–1873 | Republican | 1860; 1863; 1866; 1869 |
| 3 | | Orlan P. Whitcomb | 1873–1882 | Republican | 1872; 1875; 1878 |
| 4 | | William W. Braden | 1882–1891 | Republican | 1881; 1886 |
| 5 | | Adolph Biermann | 1891–1895 | Democratic | 1890 |
| 6 | | Robert C. Dunn | 1895–1903 | Republican | 1894; 1898 |
| 7 | | Samuel G. Iverson | 1903–1915 | Republican | 1902; 1906; 1910 |
| 8 | | J. A. O. Preus | 1915–1921 | Republican | 1914; 1918 |
| 9 | | Ray P. Chase | 1921–1931 | Republican | 1922; 1926 |
| 10 | | Stafford King | 1931–1969 | Republican | 1930; 1934; 1938; 1942; 1946; 1950; 1954; 1958; 1962; 1966 |
| 11 | | William J. O'Brien | 1969–1971 | Republican | |
| 12 | | Rolland F. Hatfield | 1971–1975 | Republican | 1970 |
| 13 | | Robert W. Mattson Jr. | 1975–1979 | Democratic-Farmer-Labor | 1974 |
| 14 | | Arne Carlson | 1979–1991 | Independent-Republican | 1978; 1982; 1986 |
| 15 | | Mark Dayton | 1991–1995 | Democratic-Farmer-Labor | 1990 |
| 16 | | Judi Dutcher | 1995–2003 | Independent-Republican (1995–2000) | 1994; 1998 |
| 16 | | Judi Dutcher | 1995–2003 | Democratic-Farmer-Labor (2000–2003) | 1994; 1998 |
| 17 | | Patricia Anderson (formerly Awada) | 2003–2007 | Republican | 2002 |
| 18 | | Rebecca Otto | 2007–2019 | Democratic-Farmer-Labor | 2006; 2010; 2014 |
| 19 | | Julie Blaha | 2019–present | Democratic-Farmer-Labor | 2018; 2022 |
| 20 | | Zack Filipovich | Elect, takes office January 4 2027 | Democratic-Farmer-Labor | 2026 |

=== Notes on Minnesota political party names ===
- Minnesota Democratic–Farmer–Labor Party: On April 15, 1944, the state Democratic Party and the Minnesota Farmer-Labor Party merged and created the Minnesota Democratic–Farmer–Labor Party (DFL). It is affiliated with the national Democratic Party.
- Republican Party of Minnesota: From November 15, 1975, to September 23, 1995, the name of the state Republican party was the Independent-Republican party (I-R). The party has always been affiliated with the national Republican Party.

=== Attempts at higher office ===
The position of state auditor has become a stepping stone in Minnesota for individuals that hold aspirations of higher office, more so in fact than any other constitutional office. In the past 50 years, two incumbent auditors - Arne Carlson and Mark Dayton - have won competitive gubernatorial races. Conversely, no incumbent or former secretary of state has ever won an election for governor or U.S. senator in that timeframe; the same goes for any incumbent or former attorney general. Likewise, Rudy Perpich and Tina Smith are the only lieutenant governors since 1972 to ever be elected a governor or a U.S. senator.
