= 1930 Minnesota State Auditor election =

- November 4, 1930
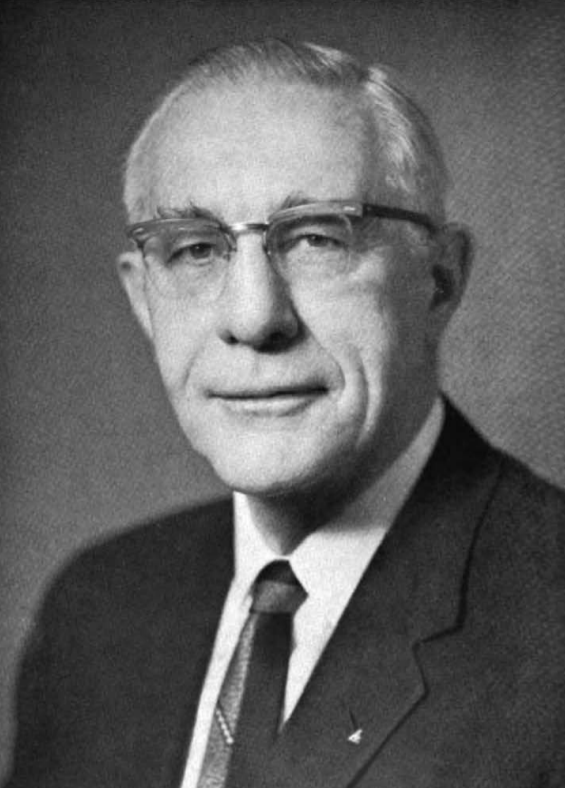

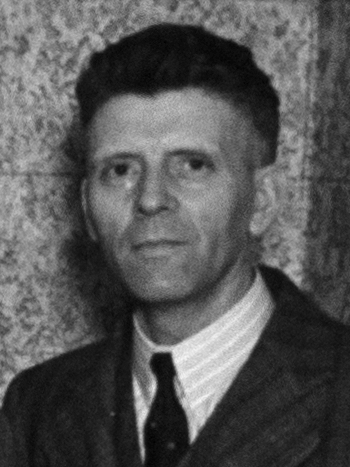

Nominee	Stafford King	Henry Teigan	Benjamin M. Loeffler
Party	Republican	Farmer–Labor	Democratic
Popular vote	385,406	260,272	78,183
Percentage	53.24%	35.96%	10.80%
State Auditor before election
Ray P. Chase
Republican
Elected State Auditor
Stafford King
Republican

The 1930 Minnesota State Auditor election was held on November 4, 1930, in order to elect the state auditor of Minnesota. Republican nominee Stafford King defeated Farmer–Labor nominee Henry Teigan and Democratic nominee Benjamin M. Loeffler.

== General election ==
On election day, November 4, 1930, Republican nominee Stafford King won the election by a margin of 125,134 votes against his foremost opponent Farmer–Labor nominee Henry Teigan, thereby retaining Republican control over the office of state auditor. King was sworn in as the 10th state auditor of Minnesota on January 3, 1931.

=== Results ===
Minnesota State Auditor election, 1930
Party	Candidate	Votes	%
Republican	Stafford King	385,406	53.24
Farmer–Labor	Henry Teigan	260,272	35.96
Democratic	Benjamin M. Loeffler	78,183	10.80
Total votes		723,861	100.00
Republican hold			
