= 1902 Minnesota State Auditor election =

- November 4, 1902
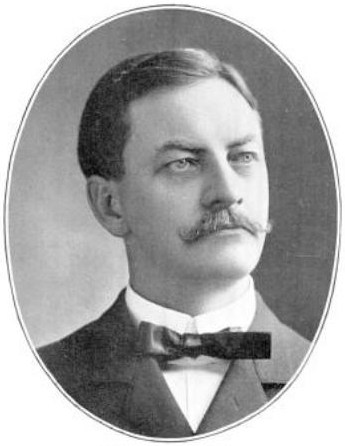

Nominee	Samuel G. Iverson	Albert G. Leick
Party	Republican	Democratic
Popular vote	163,543	85,259
Percentage	63.16%	32.93%
State Auditor before election
Robert C. Dunn
Republican
Elected State Auditor
Samuel G. Iverson
Republican

The 1902 Minnesota State Auditor election was held on November 4, 1902, in order to elect the state auditor of Minnesota. Republican nominee and former member of the Minnesota House of Representatives Samuel G. Iverson defeated Democratic nominee Albert G. Leick and Socialist nominee J. Edward Carlson.

== General election ==
On election day, November 4, 1902, Republican nominee Samuel G. Iverson won the election by a margin of 78,284 votes against his foremost opponent Democratic nominee Albert G. Leick, thereby retaining Republican control over the office of state auditor. Iverson was sworn in as the 7th state auditor of Minnesota on January 7, 1903.

=== Results ===
Minnesota State Auditor election, 1902
Party	Candidate	Votes	%
Republican	Samuel G. Iverson	163,543	63.16
Democratic	Albert G. Leick	85,259	32.93
Socialist	J. Edward Carlson	10,129	3.91
Total votes		258,931	100.00
Republican hold			
