= 1954 Minnesota State Auditor election =

- November 2, 1954
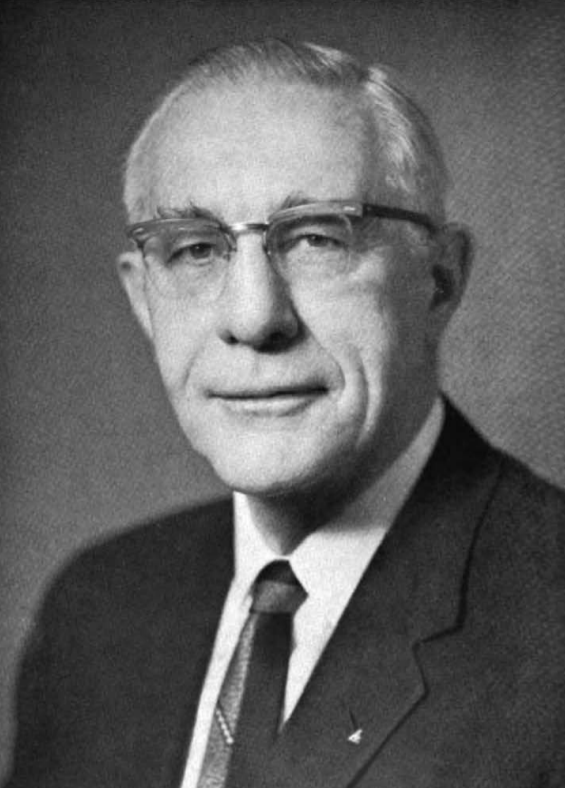

Nominee	Stafford King	Clint Haroldson
Party	Republican	Democratic (DFL)
Popular vote	567,405	553,444
Percentage	50.62%	49.38%
- County results King: 50–60% 60–70% 70–80% Haroldson: 50–60% 60–70%
State Auditor before election
Stafford King
Republican
Elected State Auditor
Stafford King
Republican

The 1954 Minnesota State Auditor election was held on November 2, 1954, in order to elect the state auditor of Minnesota. Republican nominee and incumbent state auditor Stafford King defeated Democratic–Farmer–Labor nominee Clint Haroldson.

== General election ==
On election day, November 2, 1954, Republican nominee Stafford King won re-election by a margin of 13,961 votes against his opponent Democratic–Farmer–Labor nominee Clint Haroldson, thereby retaining Republican control over the office of state auditor. King was sworn in for his seventh term on January 3, 1955.

=== Results ===
Minnesota State Auditor election, 1954
Party	Candidate	Votes	%
Republican	Stafford King (incumbent)	567,405	50.62
Democratic (DFL)	Clint Haroldson	553,444	49.38
Total votes		1,120,849	100.00
Republican hold			
