= 1942 Minnesota State Auditor election =

- November 3, 1942
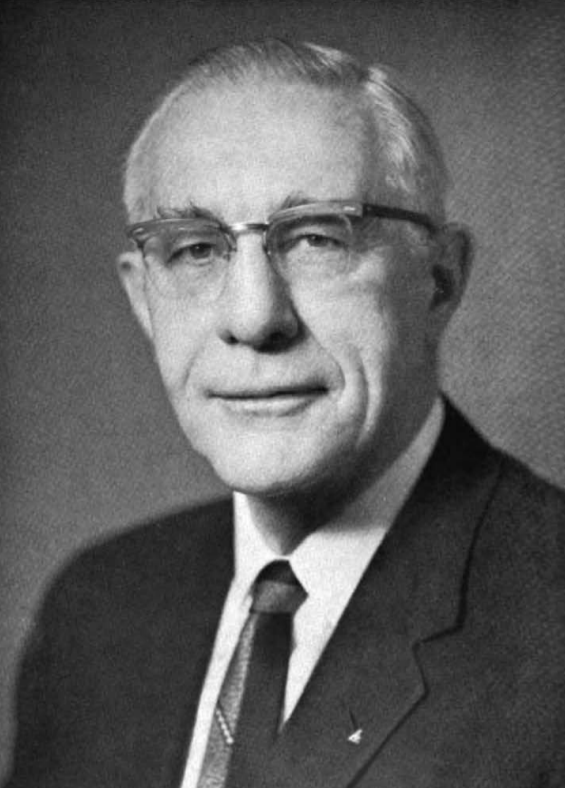

Nominee	Stafford King	W. L. Kelly
Party	Republican	Democratic
Popular vote	483,416	211,250
Percentage	69.59%	30.41%
State Auditor before election
Stafford King
Republican
Elected State Auditor
Stafford King
Republican

The 1942 Minnesota State Auditor election was held on November 3, 1942, in order to elect the state auditor of Minnesota. Republican nominee and incumbent state auditor Stafford King defeated Democratic nominee W. L. Kelly.

== General election ==
On election day, November 3, 1942, Republican nominee Stafford King won re-election by a margin of 272,166 votes against his opponent Democratic nominee W. L. Kelly, thereby retaining Republican control over the office of state auditor. King was sworn in for his fourth term on January 4, 1943.

=== Results ===
Minnesota State Auditor election, 1942
Party	Candidate	Votes	%
Republican	Stafford King (incumbent)	483,416	69.59
Democratic	W. L. Kelly	211,250	30.41
Total votes		694,666	100.00
Republican hold			
