= 1922 Minnesota State Auditor election =

- November 7, 1922
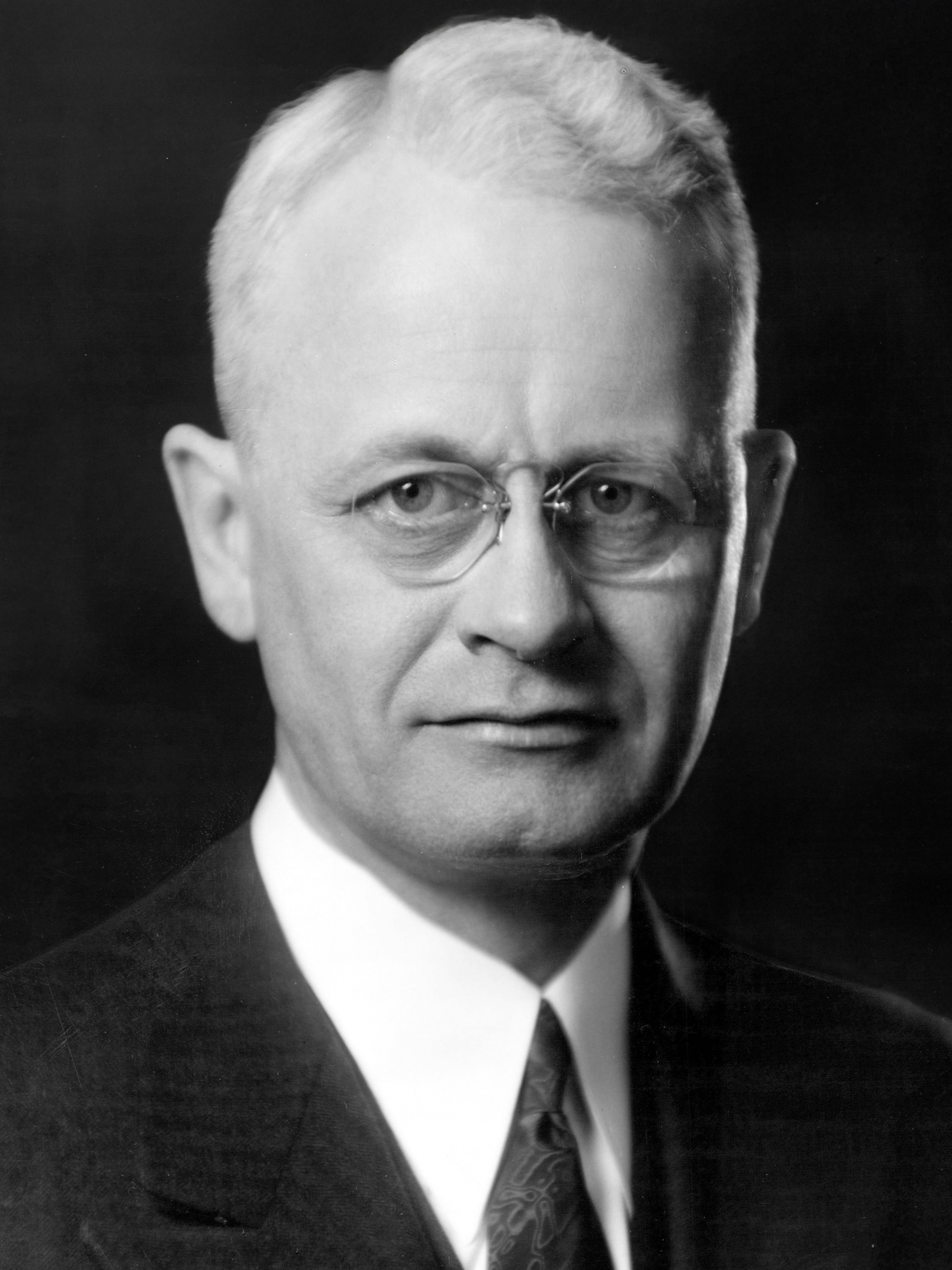

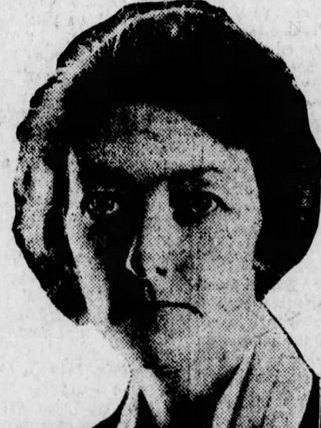

Nominee	Ray P. Chase	Eliza Evans Deming	John E. Casey
Party	Republican	Farmer–Labor	Democratic
Popular vote	315,089	253,913	72,157
Percentage	49.14%	39.60%	11.26%
State Auditor before election
J. A. O. Preus
Republican
Elected State Auditor
Ray P. Chase
Republican

The 1922 Minnesota State Auditor election was held on November 7, 1922, in order to elect the state auditor of Minnesota. Republican nominee Ray P. Chase defeated Farmer–Labor nominee Eliza Evans Deming and Democratic nominee John E. Casey.

== General election ==
On election day, November 7, 1922, Republican nominee Ray P. Chase won the election by a margin of 61,176 votes against his foremost opponent Farmer–Labor nominee Eliza Evans Deming, thereby retaining Republican control over the office of state auditor. Chase was sworn in as the 9th state auditor of Minnesota on January 3, 1923.

=== Results ===
Minnesota State Auditor election, 1922
Party	Candidate	Votes	%
Republican	Ray P. Chase	315,089	49.14
Farmer–Labor	Eliza Evans Deming	253,913	39.60
Democratic	John E. Casey	72,157	11.26
Total votes		641,159	100.00
Republican hold			
