= 1934 Minnesota State Auditor election =

- November 6, 1934
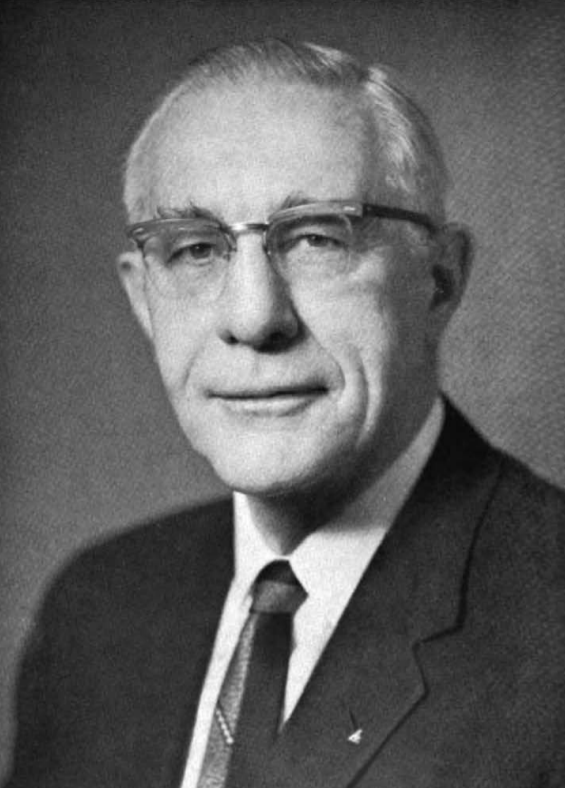

Nominee	Stafford King	John Lyons	Patrick Delaney
Party	Republican	Farmer–Labor	Democratic
Popular vote	380,302	379,654	221,221
Percentage	38.8%	38.7%	22.5%
- County results King: 30-40% 40-50% 50-60% Lyons: 30-40% 40-50% 50-60% 60-70% Delaney: 30-40% 40-50% 50-60%
State Auditor before election
Stafford King
Republican
Elected State Auditor
Stafford King
Republican

The 1934 Minnesota State Auditor election was held on November 6, 1934, to elect the state auditor of the U.S. state of Minnesota. Incumbent Republican Stafford King won re-election to a second term. King was challenged by Farmer-Labor candidate John Lyons and Democratic candidate Patrick Delaney.

As of 2024, this is the closest Minnesota State Auditor election ever.

== Candidates ==
=== Republican Party ===
Incumbent Republican State Auditor Stafford King was considered "certain" to be the party's nominee for the role again. King was endorsed by the Minnesota Republican Party in April, and was the only Republican candidate to file for the race.

=== Democratic Party ===
Of the three parties which nominated candidates in the auditor's race, only the Democratic Party had a primary, which was held on June 18.

==== Nominee ====
- Patrick J. Delaney Jr., University of St. Thomas boxing coach

==== Eliminated in primary ====
- Theodore Zimmerman, highway overseer of Le Sueur County

==== Primary results ====
Results by county: Delaney: 50–60%; 60–70%; Zimmerman: 50–60%; 60–70%; 70–80%

Democratic primary results
Party	Candidate	Votes	%
Democratic	Patrick J. Delaney, Jr.	114,842	52.80
Democratic	Theodore Zimmerman	102,660	47.20
Total votes		217,502	100.00

=== Farmer-Labor Party ===
State Representative Harold Atwood of Winona was reportedly the early favorite of Farmer-Labor leadership to take on Stafford King. Farmer-Labor Governor Floyd Olson reportedly preferred former-Republican and Speaker of the Minnesota House of Representatives Charles Munn.

John T. Lyons of Le Center originally sought the endorsement of the Farmer-Labor Party for the lieutenant governorship but settled to run for the auditor's office after the party endorsed Hjalmar Peterson for Lieutenant Governor. After winning the party's endorsement at its March convention, Lyons filed officially to run on May 4.

==== Nominee ====
- John T. Lyons, 1932 Farmer-Labor nominee for Secretary of State

==== Other candidates ====
- Harold Atwood, State Representative from Winona (lost at convention)

== General election ==
=== Campaign ===
==== Fighting the Farmer-Labor Party ====
Both Republican and Democratic leaders considered the Farmer-Labor Party to be a fundamental threat to private ownership in the state. The 1934 Republican platform explicitly called the Farmer-Labor "Marxian" and called for the combination of the Democratic and Republican tickets to defeat Farmer-Laborism:

Two great parties in the United States, the Republican and the Democratic, now furnish the vehicles for expression of the people's will. They have differed in matters of policy upon economic and other similar questions but they have never differed in their devotion to American institutions, American ideals, the liberty of the individual, and support of our constitutions, state and federal, and when these are threatened, patriotic citizens of all parties can and should join hands against the common menace.

Not since the Civil War have the citizens of Minnesota been brought face to face with a more serious situation than confronts us today. Our system of state government has been challenged by a far-reaching philosophy of life which means the entire subordination of the rights of the individual to a socialized and Sovietized dictatorship, involves the ownership of the home, the farm, and of the small business, threatens our school system, seeks to impose collectivism upon all our industries, and would result in the enslavement of labor.

At a time like this, we should and do call upon men and women of whatever party to stand together. Let us not ask: What is this or that candidate's past political affiliation, but is he for Sovietism or Americanism?

— Republican Party of Minnesota

Thus began one of the defining dynamics of the general election: the calls for a "Fusion" ballot and the suspension of Democrat Patrick Delaney's campaign.

==== Proposed "Fusion" ====
Shortly after the June 18 state primary, Democratic and Republican leaders continued discussing the formation of a combined ticket to battle the increasing strength of Farmer-Laborites. Such a move would have involved either the Democratic or Republican nominee for each statewide office dropping out of the race and endorsing their non-Farmer-Labor opponent. Democratic gubernatorial nominee John E. Regan, while rejecting the idea that he should personally drop out, nonetheless promoted the idea that Minnesotans should fight Farmer-Laborism and "the threats of communism" by uniting "efforts of all parties working for the common [anti-Farmer-Labor] cause."

The most common version of the "Fusion" proposal called for Democratic nominees to drop out in races with a Republican incumbent (such as the auditor's race) and for Republicans to drop out when facing a Farmer-Labor incumbent. If this plan were agreed to, then, Democratic State Auditor candidate Patrick Delaney would drop out from the race and endorse the Republican candidate and incumbent Stafford King. Initially, Delaney expressed openness to this plan if it were adopted by all interested parties.

==== Fusion controversies ====
In the run-up to the state Democratic convention, prospects for a combined ticket fizzled. Democratic leaders, wishing a workable deal with Republicans would emerge, reportedly felt that the predominant collaboration proposal was too rosy for Republicans. In the latest version of the proposal, Republican nominees would drop out of the top two races for Governor and U.S. Senator and Democratic nominees would drop out of all other seven statewide races, a split which Democratic leadership thought was unnecessarily slanted. Further, Republican leaders were less-than-enthused about the prospect of giving up the two most prominent offices in the state. Delaney cooled to the plan and denounced rumors that he planned to drop from the race and endorse King.

The state Democratic convention was held on July 17 in St. Cloud. Despite support within the party for the "Fusion" plan, Democratic leaders were successful in suppressing calls to suspend statewide campaigning. Oliver T. Skellet, a former Democratic candidate for governor who did not win the primary, opened discussion at the convention about the possibility of forwarding the "Fusion" proposal. However, clever procedural maneuvering by the convention's chair prevented the debate from truly getting started. Still, it was understood that support within the party ranks for "Fusion" was strong enough that it would not fade yet as a political issue.

==== Continuing Fusion discourse ====
In late July, Hugh Kennedy, the Democratic nominee for Secretary of State, offered publicly to drop from the race and back the Republican candidate Mike Holm. He also suggested that Delaney drop out and endorse King in exchange for Republicans dropping out and endorsing the Democratic candidates for Governor, Lieutenant Governor, and Attorney General. Delaney responded immediately, clarifying that he was going to be on the November ballot and was not thinking of dropping out and announcing the opening of a campaign headquarters. State Democratic leaders believed Delaney was "the most determined obstacle" to forming a potential "Fusion" agreement. Two days later, Republican and Democratic leaders announced their opposition to the plan, though Republican auditor candidate King stayed mum.

"Fusion" talks continued into August, though Delaney's position on the issue did not change. At a rally in St. Paul on August 13, Delaney remarked that he found the idea insulting, and that the Republican and Democratic schemers who devised the plan took him for a "half nut." He went on: "No one is going to sell out Pat Delaney for any reason. With your help, I'll be elected." At a rally in late August, Delaney called out the "standpat Republicans" and "weak sisters among the Democrats" who hoped for a "Fusion" deal to emerge.

On September 7, while speaking to the Ramsey County Democrats, Delaney called for a cessation of all "Fusion" discussions.

==== Communist accusations ====
The real 'radicals' that we must conquer are the cold and indifferent captains of big business who live to loot and plunder, who press the people deeper and deeper in the mire of despondency so that they themselves may roll in the filthy sty of unearned profits.

— John Lyons, The Minneapolis Tribune

After brewing for years, accusations that Farmer-Laborites were actually communists boiled over in 1934. In an August speech at Grand Rapids, Farmer-Labor candidate for State Auditor John Lyons called out "reactionary forces" he said were attempting to confuse voters with accusations of communism. In September, Lyons refused to respond to an endorsement questionnaire sent out by the Minnesota Socialist Party, essentially declaring that he did not want their support. Just days before the election, Lyons was still combating charges of communism and delivered a speech over radio to clarify his position that private enterprise was not a target of Farmer-Labor ire. He nonetheless confirmed the Farmer-Labor position against "greed and graft."

==== Allegation of embezzlement ====
Late in the campaign, Delaney accused King of embezzling public money and spending it on campaign literature. King denied the charge.

=== Endorsements ===
Patrick Delaney (Democratic)

Others

- Gene Tunney, former heavyweight boxing title holder
- Theodore Zimmerman, former primary opponent
Stafford King (Republican)

Newspapers

- Minneapolis Journal

Advocacy groups

- Recovery League of Minnesota
John Lyons (Farmer-Labor)

State Representatives

- Harold Atwood, State Representative from Winona

=== Results ===
The election was held on November 6.

1934 Minnesota State Auditor election
Party	Candidate	Votes	%	±%
Republican	Stafford King (incumbent)	380,302	38.76%	−14.48%
Farmer–Labor	John Lyons	379,654	38.69%	+2.74%
Democratic	Patrick Delaney	221,221	22.55%	+11.75%
Total votes		981,177	100.00%	
Republican hold				

== Aftermath ==
Immediately following the election, it was unclear who had won. Though it could be safely surmised that Delaney had lost, the margin between King and Lyons was exceptionally narrow.

This race was the last race to be called for a seat on Minnesota's Executive Council, a body which helps to spend money and approve the governor's executive orders. Because the Farmer-Labor Party had already won the governorship and attorney general's office, and Republicans had locked in wins in the treasurer and secretary of state races, whichever party won the auditor's office would control the executive council.

=== Trading leads ===
On the morning of Tuesday, November 7, early unofficial tabulations had Lyons leading. By the evening, King seemed to have pulled ahead. Thursday papers reported Lyons had pulled ahead again. By Friday, the closeness of the auditor's race was frontpage, headline news. King led by just 2,240 votes with 105 precincts left to report.

The race seemed to settle the following weekend when King led by 1,539 votes with only one precinct outstanding. On the same day, the Farmer-Labor Party announced that they believed there had been a miscount, and that Lyons led by 137 votes. One article claimed that Hennepin County had undercounted Lyons by as much as 1,400 votes.

=== Canvass and recount ===
After all the precincts had been appropriately tallied, King led by 648 votes. The official canvass of the state was conducted on November 20, certifying this margin and opening the door for Lyons to request a recount.

Lyons formally filed a recount request in Ramsey County District Court on November 24, alleging numerous irregularities and miscounts. On November 26, Judge John Boerner granted Lyons request and ordered the appointment of ten teams of recounters at Lyons's expense. The recount began on November 30.

In late December, recounters brought by King sued Lyons for failing to pay for the then-ongoing recount, and thereby failing to pay them. Judge Hugo Hanft ruled that Lyons was not obligated to pay for the recount until it was completed.

The recount was not completed until February 1935. Even then, 1,500 votes remained uncounted due to disputes among the recounters. Though there were still ballots waiting to be counted, King's lead had nonetheless expanded to 988 votes.

On February 21, 1935, Lyons's final challenge was dismissed in Ramsey County District Court by Judge Carlton McNally King received his certificate of election in March, having been ruled the victor by 1,031 votes.

== See also ==
- 1934 Minnesota gubernatorial election
