= 1966 Minnesota State Auditor election =

- November 8, 1966
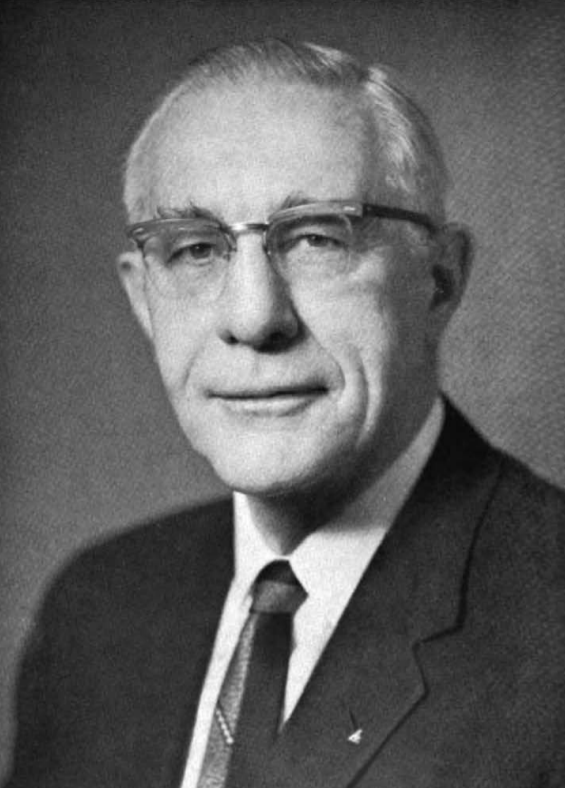

Nominee	Stafford King	Robert E. Hansen
Party	Republican	Democratic (DFL)
Popular vote	692,286	560,945
Percentage	55.24%	44.76%
- County results King: 50–60% 60–70% 70–80% Hansen: 50–60% 60–70%
State Auditor before election
Stafford King
Republican
Elected State Auditor
Stafford King
Republican

The 1966 Minnesota State Auditor election was held on November 8, 1966, in order to elect the state auditor of Minnesota. Republican nominee and incumbent state auditor Stafford King defeated Democratic–Farmer–Labor nominee Robert E. Hansen.

== General election ==
On election day, November 8, 1966, Republican nominee Stafford King won re-election by a margin of 131,341 votes against his opponent Democratic–Farmer–Labor nominee Robert E. Hansen, thereby retaining Republican control over the office of state auditor. King was sworn in for his tenth term on January 2, 1967.

=== Results ===
Minnesota State Auditor election, 1966
Party	Candidate	Votes	%
Republican	Stafford King (incumbent)	692,286	55.24
Democratic (DFL)	Robert E. Hansen	560,945	44.76
Total votes		1,253,231	100.00
Republican hold			
