= 1938 Minnesota State Auditor election =

- November 8, 1938
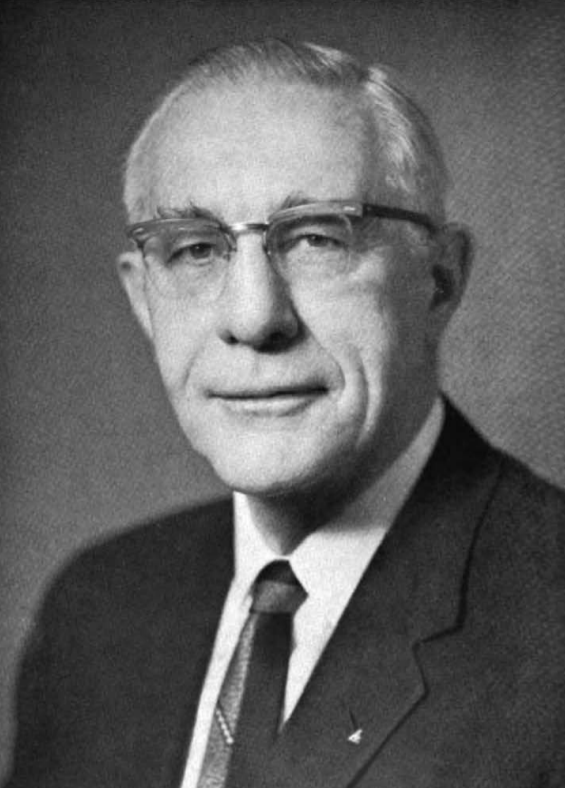

Nominee	Stafford King	John T. Lyons	J.B. Bonner
Party	Republican	Farmer–Labor	Democratic
Popular vote	616,145	364,636	92,320
Percentage	57.42%	33.98%	8.60%
State Auditor before election
Stafford King
Republican
Elected State Auditor
Stafford King
Republican

The 1938 Minnesota State Auditor election was held on November 8, 1938, in order to elect the state auditor of Minnesota. Republican nominee and incumbent state auditor Stafford King defeated Farmer–Labor nominee John T. Lyons and Democratic nominee J.B. Bonner.

== General election ==
On election day, November 8, 1938, Republican nominee Stafford King won re-election by a margin of 251,509 votes against his foremost opponent Farmer–Labor nominee John T. Lyons, thereby retaining Republican control over the office of state auditor. King was sworn in for his third term on January 2, 1939.

=== Results ===
Minnesota State Auditor election, 1938
Party	Candidate	Votes	%
Republican	Stafford King (incumbent)	616,145	57.42
Farmer–Labor	John T. Lyons	364,636	33.98
Democratic	J.B. Bonner	92,320	8.60
Total votes		1,073,101	100.00
Republican hold			
