= 1946 Minnesota State Auditor election =

- November 5, 1946
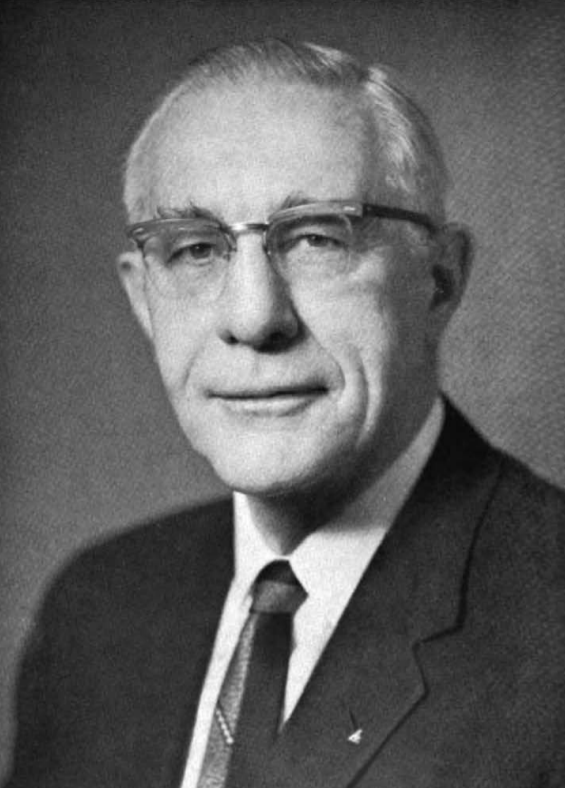

Nominee	Stafford King	Bernie M. Olson
Party	Republican	Democratic (DFL)
Popular vote	526,776	327,268
Percentage	61.68%	38.32%
- County results King: 50–60% 60–70% 70–80% 80–90% Olson: 50–60%
State Auditor before election
Stafford King
Republican
Elected State Auditor
Stafford King
Republican

The 1946 Minnesota State Auditor election was held on November 5, 1946, in order to elect the state auditor of Minnesota. Republican nominee and incumbent state auditor Stafford King defeated Democratic–Farmer–Labor nominee Bernie M. Olson.

== General election ==
On election day, November 5, 1946, Republican nominee Stafford King won re-election by a margin of 199,508 votes against his opponent Democratic–Farmer–Labor nominee Bernie M. Olson, thereby retaining Republican control over the office of state auditor. King was sworn in for his fifth term on January 6, 1947.

=== Results ===
Minnesota State Auditor election, 1946
Party	Candidate	Votes	%
Republican	Stafford King (incumbent)	526,776	61.68
Democratic (DFL)	Bernie M. Olson	327,268	38.32
Total votes		854,044	100.00
Republican hold			
