= 1914 Minnesota State Auditor election =

- November 3, 1914
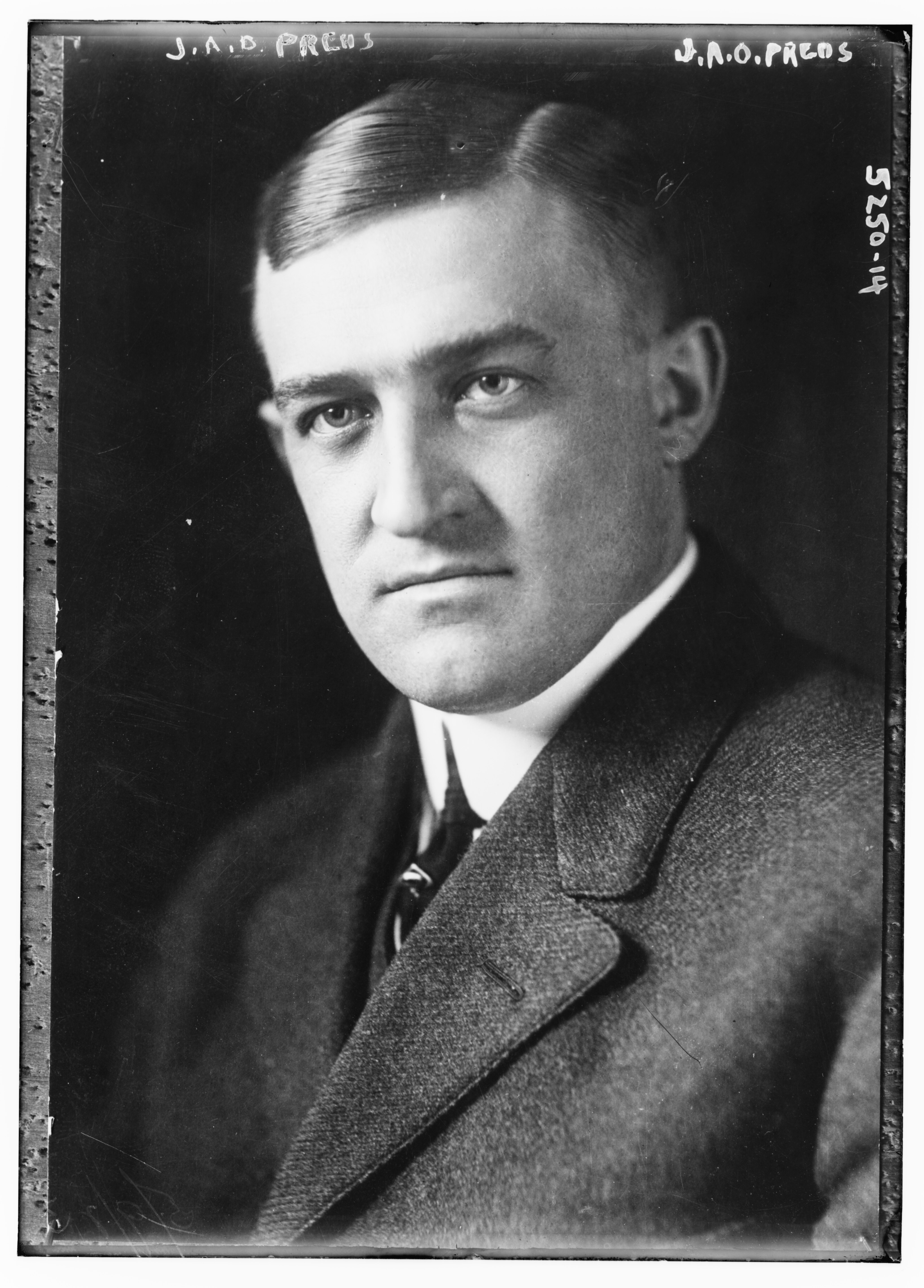

Nominee	J. A. O. Preus	Andrew J. Rush	Timothy A. Thompson
Party	Republican	Democratic	Socialist
Popular vote	181,198	92,133	30,291
Percentage	57.13%	29.05%	9.55%
State Auditor before election
Samuel G. Iverson
Republican
Elected State Auditor
J. A. O. Preus
Republican

The 1914 Minnesota State Auditor election was held on November 3, 1914, in order to elect the state auditor of Minnesota. Republican nominee J. A. O. Preus defeated Democratic nominee Andrew J. Rush, Socialist nominee Timothy A. Thompson and Progressive nominee Will Curtis.

== General election ==
On election day, November 3, 1914, Republican nominee J. A. O. Preus won the election by a margin of 89,065 votes against his foremost opponent Democratic nominee Andrew J. Rush, thereby retaining Republican control over the office of state auditor. Preus was sworn in as the 8th state auditor of Minnesota on January 3, 1915.

=== Results ===
Minnesota State Auditor election, 1914
Party	Candidate	Votes	%
Republican	J. A. O. Preus	181,198	57.13
Democratic	Andrew J. Rush	92,133	29.05
Socialist	Timothy A. Thompson	30,291	9.55
Progressive	Will Curtis	13,556	4.27
Total votes		317,178	100.00
Republican hold			
