= Office of the Legislative Auditor (Minnesota) =

Minnesota legislative branch auditor general

Legislative service agency overview
- Formed: 1973; 53 years ago
- Jurisdiction: Minnesota
- Headquarters: Saint Paul, Minnesota
- Legislative service agency executive: Judy Randall, Legislative Auditor
- Parent department: Minnesota Legislature, through the Legislative Audit Commission
- Website: www.auditor.leg.state.mn.us

The Office of the Legislative Auditor (OLA) is an independent, nonpartisan audit and evaluation office in the legislative branch of the U.S. state of Minnesota. The office conducts financial audits, performance audits, data security audits, program evaluations, and special reviews of state agencies, programs, and other state-supported organizations subject to its jurisdiction. The legislative auditor is appointed by the bicameral Legislative Audit Commission for a six-year term and serves as the commission's executive secretary.

The office was established in 1973 following recommendations by the Loaned Executive Action Program (LEAP), a private-sector study group. Its creation transferred responsibility for auditing state agencies from the former public examiner, a Cabinet official, to a new office in the legislative branch. Responsibility for auditing local governments was transferred to the state auditor.

Judy Randall has served as legislative auditor since November 2021.

== History ==
=== Establishment ===
Before 1973, Minnesota's local governments and state agencies were audited by the public examiner, an official appointed by the governor. The public examiner's office had existed since 1878.

In the early 1970s, the Loaned Executive Action Program (LEAP), a private-sector study group, examined the organization and operation of Minnesota state government. LEAP concluded that having a Cabinet official audit the executive branch did not provide what it regarded as a sufficiently independent examination. It recommended creating a legislative branch audit office comparable to what is now known as the Government Accountability Office.

The Legislature created the Office of the Legislative Auditor in 1973. The new office assumed responsibility for auditing state agencies and other state organizations, while responsibility for auditing local governments was transferred to the State Auditor.

The division of responsibilities established in 1973 remains a basic distinction between the two offices: the Legislative Auditor primarily audits state government, while the State Auditor has responsibility for auditing local governments.

=== Program evaluation ===
When the OLA was established, its principal responsibility was financial auditing. In 1975, the Legislature created a Program Evaluation Division within the office to examine the management and impact of state programs.

Program evaluation subsequently became a major component of the office's work. Minnesota law directs the legislative auditor to evaluate the degree to which state-funded activities are achieving their goals and objectives, including their effectiveness, efficiency, resource allocation, and potential duplication of services. The Legislative Audit Commission selects the subjects of program evaluations.

In 1994, the Program Evaluation Division was also assigned responsibility for best practice reviews of local government services. That responsibility was transferred to the state auditor in 2004.

=== Special reviews ===
Minnesota law authorizes the legislative auditor to conduct special reviews to fulfill legal requirements, investigate allegations that an individual or organization subject to OLA's jurisdiction may not have complied with legal requirements, respond to legislative requests, and investigate certain allegations concerning state employees.

Legislation enacted in 2025 formally established the Special Reviews Division as one of the three divisions of the Office of the Legislative Auditor. The legislation also expanded provisions concerning special reviews and authorized follow-up special reviews.

The 2025 legislation also created an annual reporting requirement concerning implementation of recommendations made in OLA financial audits, program evaluations, and special reviews during the preceding five years.

=== 2026 legislation ===
In 2026, the Legislature created an independent Office of the Inspector General in the executive branch and amended the legislative auditor's responsibilities concerning public reports of potential fraud or misuse. Beginning January 1, 2027, the legislative auditor must refer credible reports from the public concerning potential fraud or misuse in state agencies, as defined by the new law, to the inspector general. The legislative auditor may coordinate reviews and investigations with the inspector general when appropriate. Nevertheless, the 2026 legislation does not eliminate OLA's existing audit and evaluation responsibilities. The new referral provision takes effect January 1, 2027.

== Organization ==
The Office of the Legislative Auditor is subordinate to the Legislative Audit Commission, a bipartisan commission of the Minnesota Legislature. Minnesota law provides for three divisions within the office:

1. the Financial Audits Division;
1. the Program Evaluation Division; and
1. the Special Reviews Division.

Each division is supervised by a deputy auditor appointed by the legislative auditor with the approval of the Legislative Audit Commission. As of 2026, the OLA's deputy legislative auditors include Lori Leysen for the Financial Audits Division, Jodi Munson Rodriguez for the Program Evaluation Division, and Katherine Theisen for the Special Reviews Division. The deputy auditor responsible for the Financial Audits Division must hold an active certified public accountant license.

=== Legislative auditor ===
The legislative auditor is appointed by the Legislative Audit Commission for a six-year term. The position is in the unclassified service, and the legislative auditor may not simultaneously hold another public office. The legislative auditor may be removed before the end of the term only for cause following a public hearing.

The legislative auditor serves as executive secretary of the Legislative Audit Commission. Deputy auditors are appointed by the legislative auditor with the commission's approval and generally serve terms corresponding to that of the legislative auditor.

=== Legislative Audit Commission ===
The Legislative Audit Commission consists of twelve legislators: three senators appointed by the Senate majority leader, three senators appointed by the Senate minority leader, three representatives appointed by the Speaker of the House, and three representatives appointed by the House minority leader.

The commission selects topics for the OLA's program evaluations. Legislators and legislative committees may suggest topics, but the legislative auditor may conduct program evaluations only after approval by the commission.

The commission also reviews reports from the legislative auditor and may make recommendations concerning improvements to the state's financial management and internal controls.

The commission's chair and vice chair are elected in January of each odd-numbered year. The positions alternate between the Senate and House of Representatives, and the chair and vice chair must belong to different political parties.

== Powers and responsibilities ==
=== Postaudits ===
The legislative auditor is required to audit the financial statements of the state of Minnesota as contained in its annual comprehensive financial report (ACFR) and, as resources permit, conduct performance audits of the internal controls implemented by state agencies, departments, boards, commissions, offices, courts, the University of Minnesota, the Minnesota State Colleges and Universities system, and other organizations subject to OLA's jurisdiction. The Financial Audits Division also conducts data security audits of the state's information technology architecture, including assessments of management controls designed to protect government data and assure compliance with applicable requirements governing information systems.

Whether financial, performance, or data security audits, all audits must be conducted according to Government Auditing Standards. In due course of any such audits, the legislative auditor is required to examine compliance with laws concerning the appropriate and economical use of public funds and other public resources and may investigate allegations of noncompliance as part of a financial audit or separately.

=== Program evaluations ===
Program evaluations differ from financial audits, data security audits, and performance audits in that they examine the effectiveness, efficiency, and management of government programs rather than primarily examining financial statements, information technology, or internal controls.

Under Minnesota law, program evaluations may analyze program goals and objectives, methods of measuring results, alternative approaches, resource allocation, and duplication among government agencies. The legislative auditor may recommend changes intended to improve effectiveness or reduce the cost of government services.

The Legislative Audit Commission periodically selects evaluation topics. The commission gives primary consideration to subjects likely to produce recommendations concerning cost savings, increased productivity, or the elimination of duplication among public agencies.

After an evaluation report has been released, the legislative auditor may conduct a follow-up review to assess changes that have occurred.

=== Special reviews ===
The OLA conducts special reviews when authorized by law, requested by the Legislature, or when allegations within its jurisdiction warrant examination. Special reviews generally have a narrower scope than program evaluations or comprehensive financial audits.

The legislative auditor has authority to obtain government data and documents relevant to its work, including certain information classified as not public. The office is subject to Minnesota's Government Data Practices Act and is required to protect not-public data from unlawful disclosure.

State law requires certain officials of organizations subject to OLA audit to notify the legislative auditor when they receive information indicating that public money or other public resources may have been used for an unlawful purpose or that not-public government data may have been accessed without authorization. The legislative auditor may coordinate an investigation with appropriate law enforcement officials.

=== Follow-up and implementation ===
Beginning in 2025, Minnesota law requires the legislative auditor, as resources permit, to report annually on the implementation of recommendations made during the previous five years in financial audits, data security audits, performance audits, program evaluations, and special reviews. The reports are provided to legislative committee leaders with fiscal jurisdiction over affected entities.

== Reports and public role ==
The OLA publishes reports from its Financial Audits Division, Program Evaluation Division, and Special Reviews Division. Its reports provide information for legislative oversight and recommendations concerning government operations, management, financial controls, and accountability.

The office's reports have received coverage in Minnesota news media, particularly when they identify weaknesses in state program management, financial controls, or oversight.

One of the office's notable investigations involved the Minnesota Sports Facilities Authority and its use of luxury suites at U.S. Bank Stadium. The OLA concluded in 2017 that the authority had violated core ethical principles by providing free tickets to friends and family of officials.

The OLA's evaluation of MNsure, Minnesota's health-insurance exchange, received extensive coverage after the office concluded that the exchange's website rollout had experienced significant problems. The report examined the management and development of the state's health-insurance marketplace.

In 2024, an OLA special review of the Feeding Our Future federal child-nutrition program received extensive media coverage. The review examined the Minnesota Department of Education's oversight of the program amid a federal fraud investigation involving approximately $250 million in alleged fraud.

The office's work has also been described by Minnesota media as an important mechanism for legislative oversight. A 2024 article in MinnPost characterized the OLA as a small office whose audits and investigations can attract significant attention in state government.

== List of legislative auditors ==
The following individuals have served as legislative auditor or acting/co-acting legislative auditor since the office's establishment in 1973:

Name	Position	Term
Robert A. Whitaker	Legislative Auditor	September 1, 1973 – May 31, 1977
Willard Olson	Acting Legislative Auditor	June 1, 1977 – August 14, 1977
Eldon Stoehr	Legislative Auditor	August 15, 1977 – September 18, 1981
Pat Spellacy / James Nobles	Co-acting Legislative Auditors	September 19, 1981 – November 20, 1982
Gerald W. Christenson	Legislative Auditor	November 21, 1982 – June 30, 1983
John Asmussen / James Nobles	Co-acting Legislative Auditors	July 1, 1983 – November 16, 1983
James Nobles	Legislative Auditor	November 17, 1983 – October 6, 2021
Joel Alter	Interim Legislative Auditor	October 7, 2021 – November 9, 2021
Judy Randall	Legislative Auditor	November 9, 2021 – present

James Nobles served as legislative auditor for nearly 38 years, making him the longest-serving head of the office. He retired in October 2021.

Randall, who had previously served as deputy legislative auditor for the Program Evaluation Division, was selected by the Legislative Audit Commission in November 2021 following a nationwide search. She had worked in the OLA for more than two decades before becoming legislative auditor.

== Relationship to the Minnesota state auditor ==
The Office of the Legislative Auditor and the state auditor are separate public offices with different jurisdictions.

The legislative auditor is appointed by the bipartisan Legislative Audit Commission and primarily oversees auditing and evaluation of state government. The state auditor is a separately elected constitutional officer whose office has responsibility for auditing local governments and performs other duties established by state law.

The distinction dates to the 1973 reorganization that divided the former public examiner's responsibilities between the newly created Office of the Legislative Auditor and the Office of the State Auditor.

== See also ==
- Minnesota Legislature
- Minnesota State Auditor
- Government Accountability Office
- Auditor General
