= 1994 Minnesota State Auditor election =

- November 8, 1994

Nominee	Judi Dutcher	Donald Moe
Party	Ind.-Republican	Democratic (DFL)
Popular vote	836,626	768,630
Percentage	49.62%	45.59%
- County results Dutcher: 40-50% 50-60% 60-70% Moe: 40-50% 50-60% 60-70%
State Auditor before election
Mark Dayton
Democratic (DFL)
Elected State Auditor
Judi Dutcher
Ind.-Republican

The 1994 Minnesota State Auditor election was held on November 8, 1994, in order to elect the state auditor of Minnesota. Independent Republican nominee Judi Dutcher defeated Democratic–Farmer–Labor nominee and former member of the Minnesota Senate Donald Moe and Grassroots nominee Steven C. Anderson.

== General election ==
On election day, November 8, 1994, Independent Republican nominee Judi Dutcher won the election by a margin of 67,996 votes against her opponent Democratic–Farmer–Labor nominee Donald Moe, thereby gaining Republican control over the office of state auditor. Dutcher was sworn in as the 16th state auditor of Minnesota on January 3, 1995.

=== Results ===
Minnesota State Auditor election, 1994
Party	Candidate	Votes	%
Ind.-Republican	Judi Dutcher	836,626	49.62
Democratic (DFL)	Donald Moe	768,630	45.59
Grassroots	Steven C. Anderson	80,811	4.79
Total votes		1,686,067	100.00
Ind.-Republican gain from Democratic (DFL)			
