= 1950 Minnesota State Auditor election =

- November 7, 1950
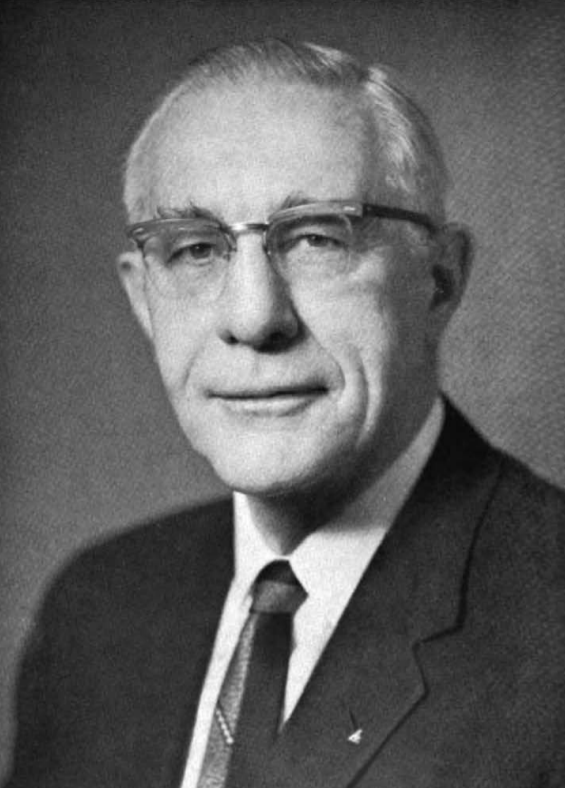

| Nominee | Stafford King | Elmer A. Borgschatz |
| Party | Republican | Democratic (DFL) |
| Popular vote | 627,754 | 371,665 |
| Percentage | 62.81% | 37.19% |
- County results King: 50–60% 60–70% 70–80% 80–90% Borgschatz: 50–60%
State Auditor before election
Stafford King
Republican
Elected State Auditor
Stafford King
Republican

The 1950 Minnesota State Auditor election was held on November 7, 1950, in order to elect the state auditor of Minnesota. Republican nominee and incumbent state auditor Stafford King defeated Democratic–Farmer–Labor nominee Elmer A. Borgschatz.

== General election ==
On election day, November 7, 1950, Republican nominee Stafford King won re-election by a margin of 256,089 votes against his opponent Democratic–Farmer–Labor nominee Elmer A. Borgschatz, thereby retaining Republican control over the office of state auditor. King was sworn in for his sixth term on January 8, 1951.

=== Results ===
Minnesota State Auditor election, 1950
| Party | Candidate | Votes | % |
|---|---|---|---|
| Republican | Stafford King (incumbent) | 627,754 | 62.81 |
| Democratic (DFL) | Elmer A. Borgschatz | 371,665 | 37.19 |
| Total votes | | 999,419 | 100.00 |
| Republican hold | | | |
