= 1926 Minnesota State Auditor election =

- November 2, 1926
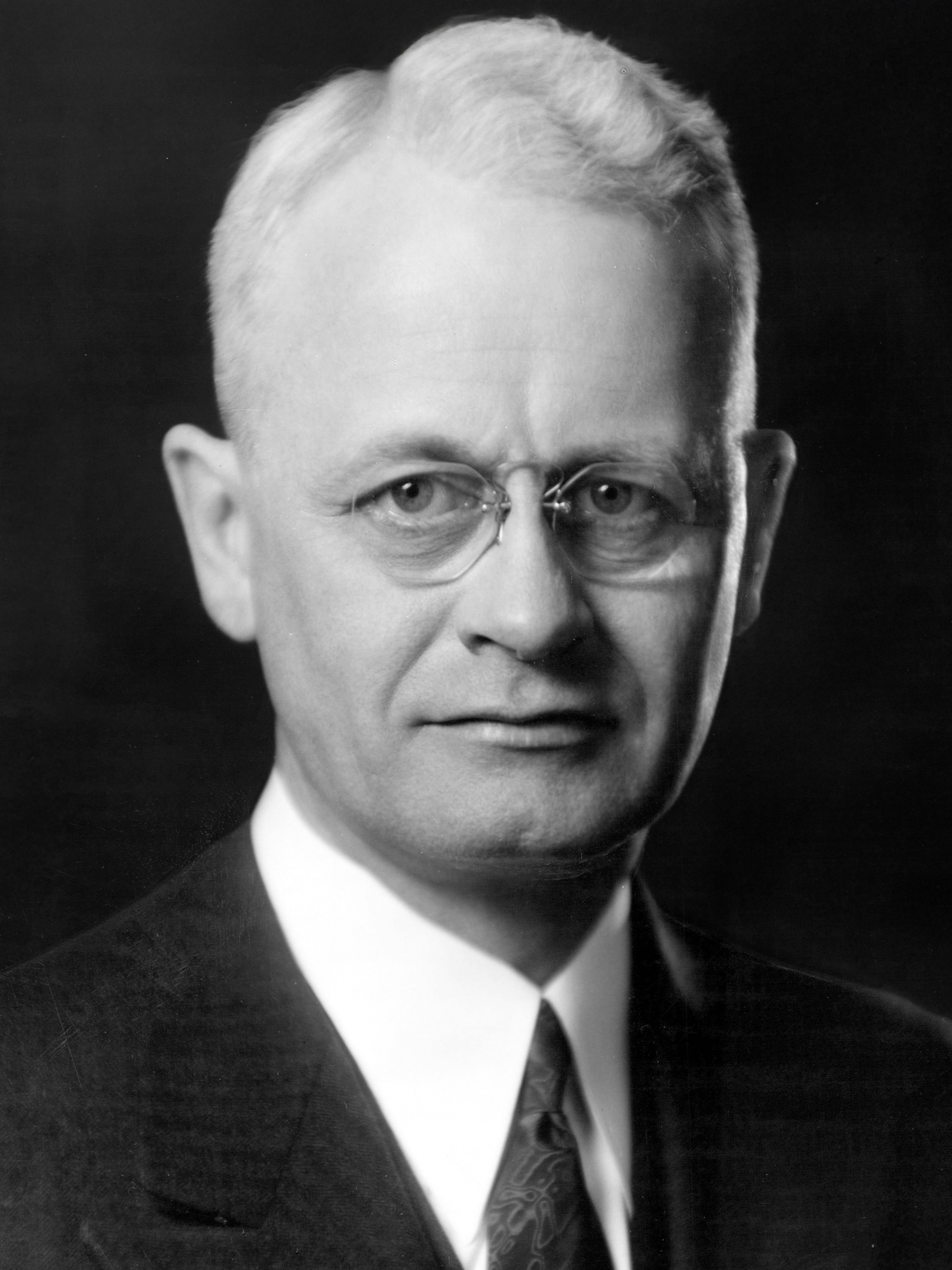

Nominee	Ray P. Chase	Severin O. Tjosvold
Party	Republican	Farmer–Labor
Popular vote	413,691	218,074
Percentage	65.48%	34.52%
State Auditor before election
Ray P. Chase
Republican
Elected State Auditor
Ray P. Chase
Republican

The 1926 Minnesota State Auditor election was held on November 2, 1926, in order to elect the state auditor of Minnesota. Republican nominee and incumbent state auditor Ray P. Chase defeated Farmer–Labor nominee Severin O. Tjosvold.

== General election ==
On election day, November 2, 1926, Republican nominee Ray P. Chase won re-election by a margin of 195,617 votes against his opponent Farmer–Labor nominee Severin O. Tjosvold, thereby retaining Republican control over the office of state auditor. Chase was sworn in for his second term on January 3, 1927.

=== Results ===
Minnesota State Auditor election, 1926
Party	Candidate	Votes	%
Republican	Ray P. Chase (incumbent)	413,691	65.48
Farmer–Labor	Severin O. Tjosvold	218,074	34.52
Total votes		631,765	100.00
Republican hold			
