= 1890 Minnesota State Auditor election =

- November 4, 1890
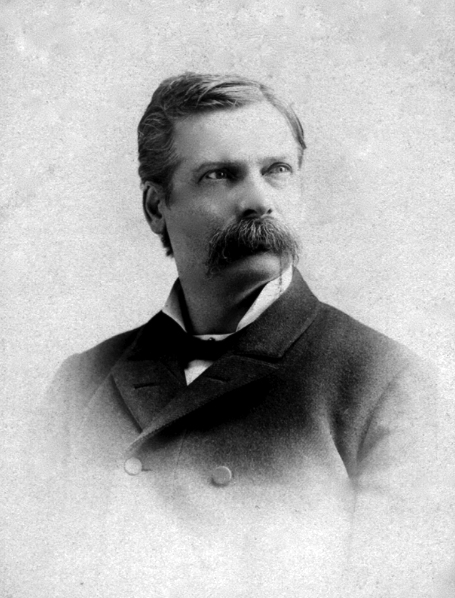

Nominee	Adolph Biermann	Peter J. McGuire
Party	Democratic	Republican
Popular vote	130,857	97,659
Percentage	54.75%	40.86%
State Auditor before election
William W. Braden
Republican
Elected State Auditor
Adolph Biermann
Democratic

The 1890 Minnesota State Auditor election was held on November 4, 1890, in order to elect the state auditor of Minnesota. Democratic nominee and former nominee for governor of Minnesota Adolph Biermann defeated Republican nominee Peter J. McGuire and Prohibition nominee Ole Kron.

== General election ==
On election day, November 4, 1890, Democratic nominee Adolph Biermann won the election by a margin of 33,198 votes against his foremost opponent Republican nominee Peter J. McGuire, thereby gaining Democratic control over the office of state auditor. Biermann was sworn in as the 5th state auditor of Minnesota on January 5, 1891.

=== Results ===
Minnesota State Auditor election, 1890
Party	Candidate	Votes	%
Democratic	Adolph Biermann	130,857	54.75
Republican	Peter J. McGuire	97,659	40.86
Prohibition	Ole Kron	10,476	4.39
Total votes		238,992	100.00
Democratic gain from Republican			
