= 1894 Minnesota State Auditor election =

- November 6, 1894
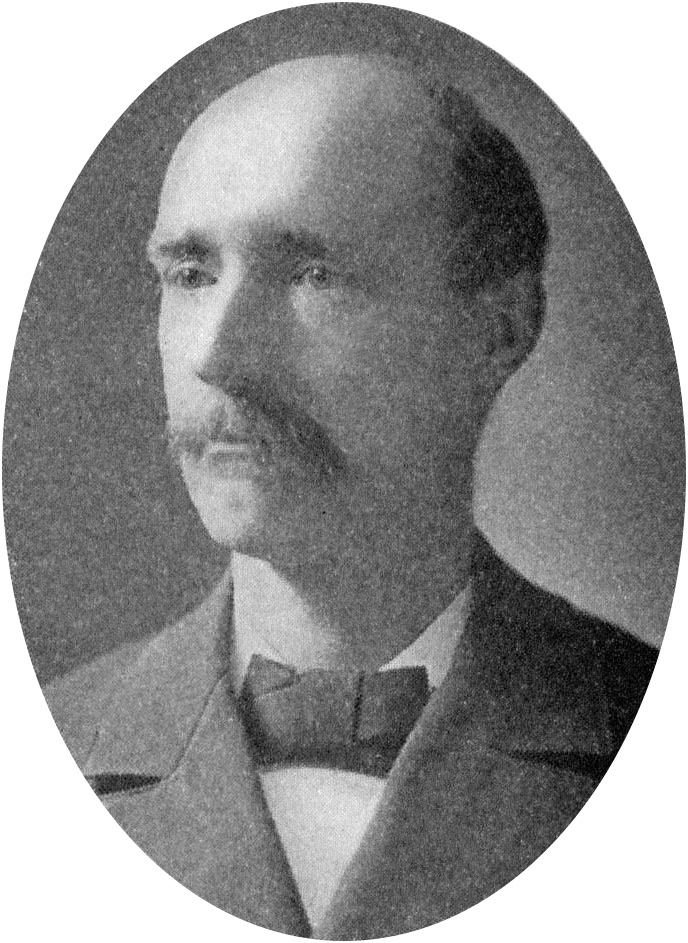

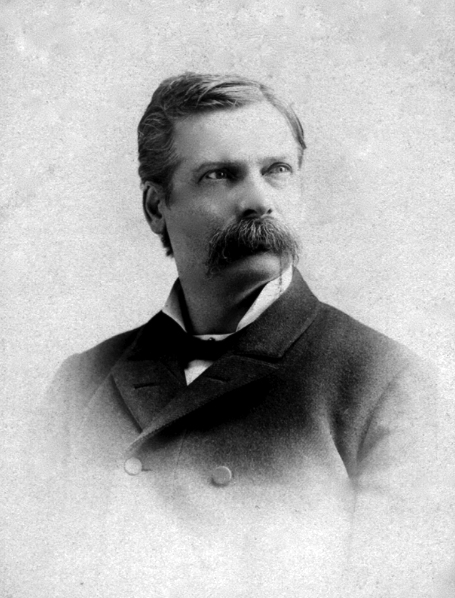

Nominee	Robert C. Dunn	Adolph Biermann	Andrew L. Stromberg
Party	Republican	Democratic	Populist
Popular vote	148,281	76,737	55,411
Percentage	51.23%	26.51%	19.14%
State Auditor before election
Adolph Biermann
Democratic
Elected State Auditor
Robert C. Dunn
Republican

The 1894 Minnesota State Auditor election was held on November 6, 1894, in order to elect the state auditor of Minnesota. Republican nominee and former member of the Minnesota House of Representatives Robert C. Dunn defeated Democratic nominee and incumbent state auditor Adolph Biermann, People's nominee Andrew L. Stromberg and Prohibition nominee Seth S. Johnson.

== General election ==
On election day, November 6, 1894, Republican nominee Robert C. Dunn won the election by a margin of 71,544 votes against his foremost opponent Democratic nominee Adolph Biermann, thereby gaining Republican control over the office of state auditor. Dunn was sworn in as the 6th state auditor of Minnesota on January 31, 1895.

=== Results ===
Minnesota State Auditor election, 1894
Party	Candidate	Votes	%
Republican	Robert C. Dunn	148,281	51.23
Democratic	Adolph Biermann (incumbent)	76,737	26.51
Populist	Andrew L. Stromberg	55,411	19.14
Prohibition	Seth S. Johnson	9,007	3.12
Total votes		289,436	100.00
Republican gain from Democratic			
