= 1910 Minnesota State Auditor election =

- November 8, 1910
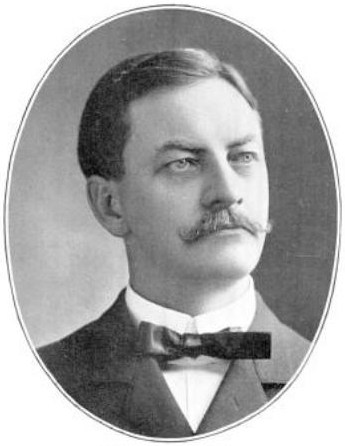

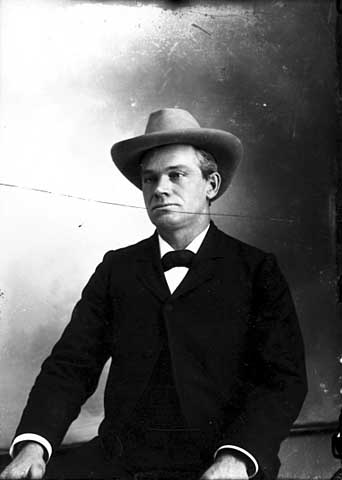
Nominee	Samuel G. Iverson	Thomas J. Meighen
Party	Republican	Democratic
Popular vote	179,888	85,450
Percentage	67.80%	32.20%
State Auditor before election
Samuel G. Iverson
Republican
Elected State Auditor
Samuel G. Iverson
Republican

The 1910 Minnesota State Auditor election was held on November 8, 1910, in order to elect the state auditor of Minnesota. Republican nominee and incumbent state auditor Samuel G. Iverson defeated Democratic nominee Thomas J. Meighen.

== General election ==
On election day, November 8, 1910, Republican nominee Samuel G. Iverson won re-election by a margin of 94,438 votes against his opponent Democratic nominee Thomas J. Meighen, thereby retaining Republican control over the office of state auditor. Iverson was sworn in for his third term on January 7, 1911.

=== Results ===
Minnesota State Auditor election, 1910
Party	Candidate	Votes	%
Republican	Samuel G. Iverson (incumbent)	179,888	67.80
Democratic	Thomas J. Meighen	85,450	32.20
Total votes		265,338	100.00
Republican hold			
