= 1898 Minnesota State Auditor election =

- November 8, 1898
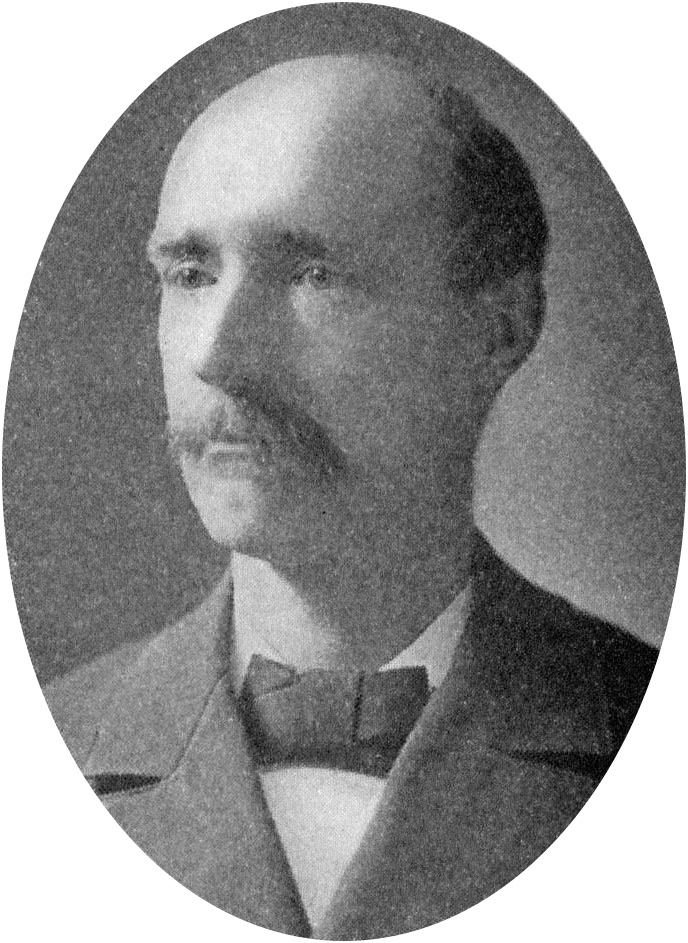

Nominee	Robert C. Dunn	George N. Lamphere
Party	Republican	Democratic
Popular vote	139,241	92,487
Percentage	56.90%	37.80%
State Auditor before election
Robert C. Dunn
Republican
Elected State Auditor
Robert C. Dunn
Republican

The 1898 Minnesota State Auditor election was held on November 8, 1898, in order to elect the state auditor of Minnesota. Republican nominee and incumbent state auditor Robert C. Dunn defeated Democratic nominee George N. Lamphere, Prohibition nominee Delburt U. Weld and Midroad-Populist nominee Charles H. Hopkins.

== General election ==
On election day, November 8, 1898, Republican nominee Robert C. Dunn won re-election by a margin of 46,754 votes against his foremost opponent Democratic nominee George N. Lamphere, thereby retaining Republican control over the office of state auditor. Dunn was sworn in for his second term on January 3, 1899.

=== Results ===
Minnesota State Auditor election, 1898
Party	Candidate	Votes	%
Republican	Robert C. Dunn (incumbent)	139,241	56.90
Democratic	George N. Lamphere	92,487	37.80
Prohibition	Delburt U. Weld	7,747	3.17
Populist	Charles H. Hopkins	5,226	2.13
Total votes		244,701	100.00
Republican hold			
