= 1958 Minnesota State Auditor election =

- November 4, 1958
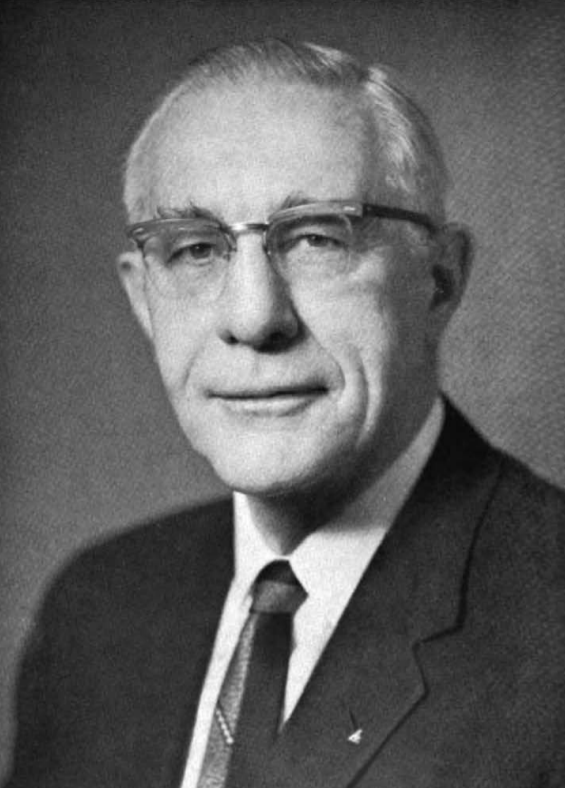

Nominee	Stafford King	George A. Farr
Party	Republican	Democratic (DFL)
Popular vote	574,600	547,836
Percentage	51.19%	48.81%
- County results King: 50–60% 60–70% Farr: 50–60% 60–70%
State Auditor before election
Stafford King
Republican
Elected State Auditor
Stafford King
Republican

The 1958 Minnesota State Auditor election was held on November 4, 1958, in order to elect the state auditor of Minnesota. Republican nominee and incumbent state auditor Stafford King defeated Democratic–Farmer–Labor nominee George A. Farr.

== General election ==
On election day, November 4, 1958, Republican nominee Stafford King won re-election by a margin of 26,764 votes against his opponent Democratic–Farmer–Labor nominee George A. Farr, thereby retaining Republican control over the office of state auditor. King was sworn in for his eighth term on January 5, 1959.

=== Results ===
Minnesota State Auditor election, 1958
Party	Candidate	Votes	%
Republican	Stafford King (incumbent)	574,600	51.19
Democratic (DFL)	George A. Farr	547,836	48.81
Total votes		1,122,436	100.00
Republican hold			
