= 1906 Minnesota State Auditor election =

- November 6, 1906
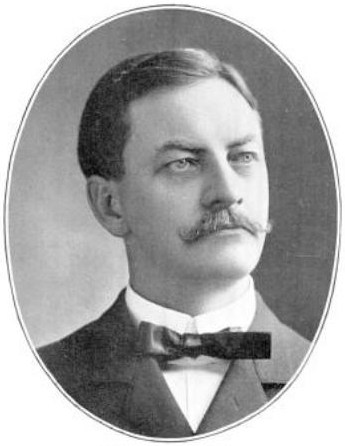

Nominee	Samuel G. Iverson	A. E. Aarnes
Party	Republican	Democratic
Popular vote	168,421	87,322
Percentage	65.86%	34.14%
State Auditor before election
Samuel G. Iverson
Republican
Elected State Auditor
Samuel G. Iverson
Republican

The 1906 Minnesota State Auditor election was held on November 6, 1906, in order to elect the state auditor of Minnesota. Republican nominee and incumbent state auditor Samuel G. Iverson defeated Democratic nominee A. E. Aarnes.

== General election ==
On election day, November 6, 1906, Republican nominee Samuel G. Iverson won re-election by a margin of 81,099 votes against his opponent Democratic nominee A. E. Aarnes, thereby retaining Republican control over the office of state auditor. Iverson was sworn in for his second term on January 7, 1907.

=== Results ===
Minnesota State Auditor election, 1906
Party	Candidate	Votes	%
Republican	Samuel G. Iverson (incumbent)	168,421	65.86
Democratic	A. E. Aarnes	87,322	34.14
Total votes		255,743	100.00
Republican hold			
