= 1857 Minnesota State Auditor election =

- October 13, 1857
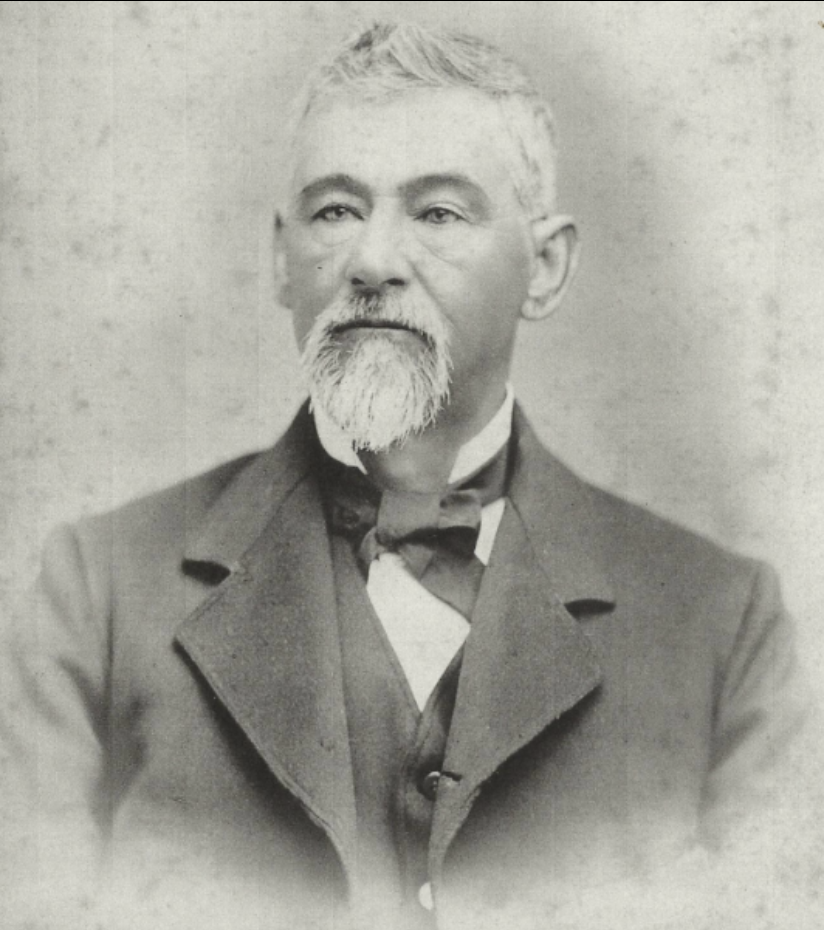

Nominee	William F. Dunbar	Alexander P. Lane
Party	Democratic	Republican
Popular vote	18,218	17,026
Percentage	51.69%	48.31%
State Auditor before election
Julius Georgii (Territorial)
Democratic
Elected State Auditor
William F. Dunbar
Democratic

The 1857 Minnesota State Auditor election was held on October 13, 1857, in order to elect the first state auditor of Minnesota upon Minnesota acquiring statehood on May 11, 1858. Democratic nominee and former member of the Minnesota Territorial House of Representatives William F. Dunbar defeated Republican nominee Alexander P. Lane.

== General election ==
On election day, October 13, 1857, Democratic nominee William F. Dunbar won the election by a margin of 1,192 votes against his opponent Republican nominee Alexander P. Lane, thereby retaining Democratic control over the office of state auditor. Dunbar was sworn in as the 1st state auditor of Minnesota on May 11, 1858.

=== Results ===
Minnesota State Auditor election, 1857
Party	Candidate	Votes	%
Democratic	William F. Dunbar	18,218	51.69
Republican	Alexander P. Lane	17,026	48.31
Total votes		35,244	100.00
Democratic hold			
