= 1962 Minnesota State Auditor election =

- November 6, 1962
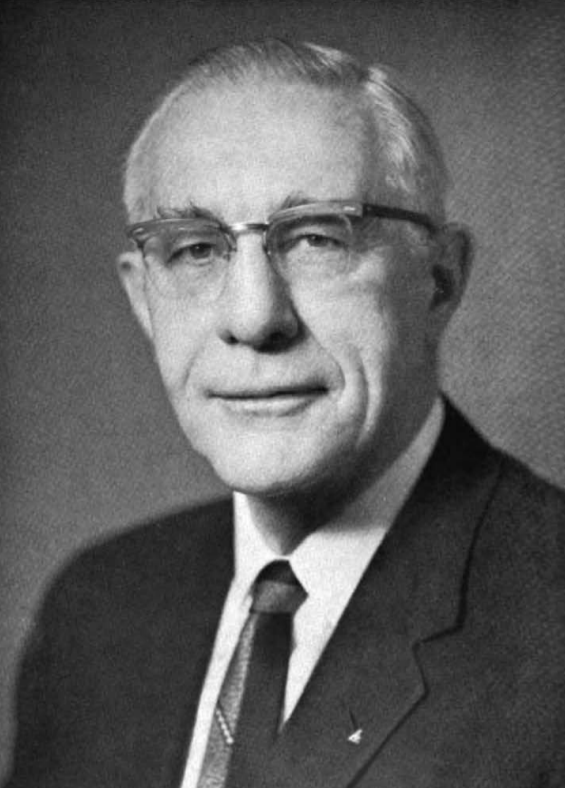

Nominee	Stafford King	John D. Nevin
Party	Republican	Democratic (DFL)
Popular vote	658,111	560,032
Percentage	54.03%	45.97%
- County results King: 50–60% 60–70% 70–80% Nevin: 50–60% 60–70%
State Auditor before election
Stafford King
Republican
Elected State Auditor
Stafford King
Republican

The 1962 Minnesota State Auditor election was held on November 6, 1962, in order to elect the state auditor of Minnesota. Republican nominee and incumbent state auditor Stafford King defeated Democratic–Farmer–Labor nominee John D. Nevin.

== General election ==
On election day, November 6, 1962, Republican nominee Stafford King won re-election by a margin of 98,079 votes against his opponent Democratic–Farmer–Labor nominee John D. Nevin, thereby retaining Republican control over the office of state auditor. King was sworn in for his ninth term on January 8, 1963.

=== Results ===
Minnesota State Auditor election, 1962
Party	Candidate	Votes	%
Republican	Stafford King (incumbent)	658,111	54.03
Democratic (DFL)	John D. Nevin	560,032	45.97
Total votes		1,218,143	100.00
Republican hold			
