= Minnesota Department of Management and Budget =

Agency overview
- Jurisdiction: Minnesota
- Headquarters: 658 Cedar Street, Saint Paul, Minnesota
- Agency executive: Erin Campbell, Commissioner
- Website: https://mn.gov/mmb/

The Minnesota Department of Management and Budget, otherwise abbreviated as MMB, is a cabinet-level state agency responsible for coordinating the financial management and personnel administration processes of state government.

== Role and functions ==
=== Financial management ===
MMB serves as the comptroller and treasurer for the whole of state government, coordinating accounting, cash management, and debt management across all state agencies. MMB maintains and operates the statewide financial reporting system called SWIFT and uses this financial data, along with economic trends from the state economist, to prepare operating and capital budgets for the state. MMB also issues reports on Minnesota's economic health that are frequently cited by the media.

=== Personnel administration ===
MMB works in concert with other state agencies to provide coordinated human resources management to all three branches of state government. In particular, it negotiates with bargaining units and maintains the civil service classification system. MMB also provides human resources training and leadership development to other state agencies, administers employee insurance plans and payroll, and enforces federal and state laws applicable to the state government's workforce.

== History ==
The first iteration of MMB was the Budget Bureau, a division of the Department of Administration created in 1939 to assist the governor in the preparation of the executive budget. Later in 1971, the Loaned Executive Action Program (LEAP) convened by the late Wendell Anderson, Minnesota's 33rd governor, recommended consolidating the state's accounting and budgeting functions into a single agency under the governor's supervision in order to provide comprehensive budgetary control and financial reporting oversight of all state spending. A 1973 state government reorganization saw LEAP's recommendations put into action, with the former accounting functions of the elected state auditor transferred to the Budget Bureau - which in turn became the Department of Finance. At the same time, the Department of the Public Examiner was abolished and its powers and duties in relation to the supervision and auditing of local government finances were transferred to the Office of the State Auditor.

The Department of Finance's responsibilities expanded further following the abolition of the state treasurer's office in 2003 by constitutional amendment. Throughout Minnesota's history as a U.S. territory and state, the elected state treasurer had always been responsible for managing and accounting for the state's cash flows, coordinating banking services for state agencies, and issuing and servicing the state debt. With the repeal of the Office of the State Treasurer however, those responsibilities were transferred to the Department of Finance.

The most recent change to MMB came in 2008, with the repeal of the Department of Employee Relations (DER) which had previously administered the state government's workforce. DOER's staff and responsibilities - together with the Management Analysis Division at DOA - were merged with the Department of Finance, which was then renamed the Department of Management and Budget.
