= Donald Moe =

American politician and businessman

Donald Melvin "Don" Moe (December 24, 1942 – December 30, 2017) was an American politician and businessman.

Born in Crookston, Minnesota, Moe served in the United States Army. He then received his bachelor's degree in business administration from the University of Minnesota and went to graduate school there. He owned real estate and was an investor. He served in the Minnesota House of Representatives as a Democrat from 1971 to 1980 and then in the Minnesota Senate from 1981 to 1990. He was involved in the real estate investment business in Saint Paul, Minnesota in the Ramsey Hill neighborhood. His brother is Roger Moe who also served in the Minnesota Legislature. He died of cancer at his house in Saint Paul, Minnesota.

== Notes ==
Party political offices
Preceded by Mark Dayton	Democratic nominee for Minnesota State Auditor; 1994	Succeeded by Nancy A. Larson
