= 1978 Minnesota State Auditor election =

- November 7, 1978
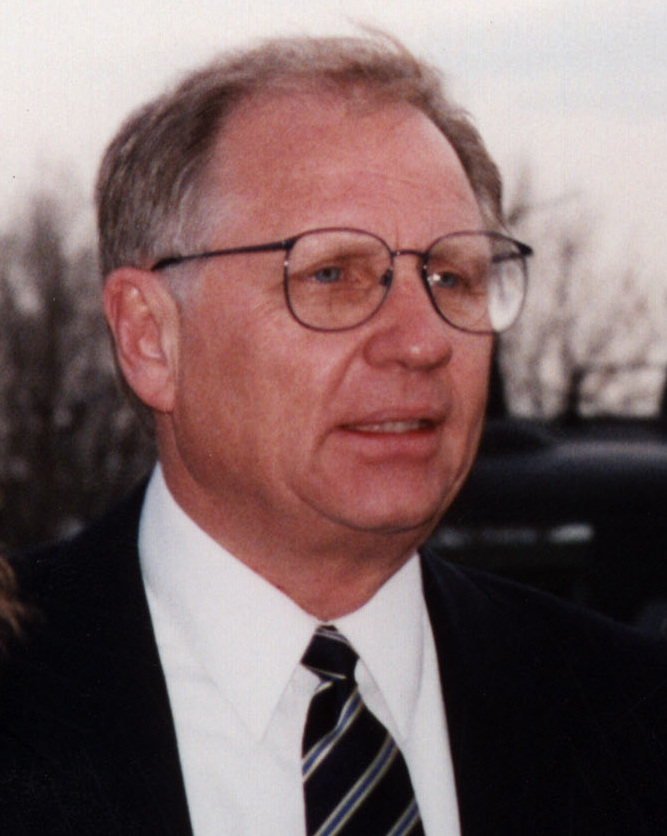

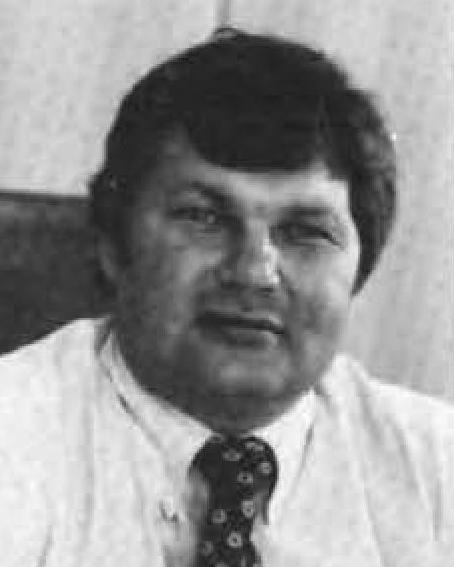
Nominee	Arne Carlson	Robert W. Mattson Jr.
Party	Republican	Democratic (DFL)
Popular vote	773,150	695,943
Percentage	51.83%	46.66%
- County results Carlson: 40–50% 50–60% 60–70% Mattson: 40–50% 50–60% 60–70%
State Auditor before election
Robert W. Mattson Jr.
Democratic (DFL)
Elected State Auditor
Arne Carlson
Republican

The 1978 Minnesota State Auditor election was held on November 7, 1978, in order to elect the state auditor of Minnesota. Republican nominee and incumbent member of the Minnesota House of Representatives Arne Carlson defeated Democratic–Farmer–Labor nominee and incumbent state auditor Robert W. Mattson Jr. and Communist nominee Helen S. Kruth.

== General election ==
On election day, November 7, 1978, Republican nominee Arne Carlson won the election by a margin of 77,207 votes against his foremost opponent Democratic–Farmer–Labor nominee Robert W. Mattson Jr., thereby gaining Republican control over the office of state auditor. Carlson was sworn in as the 14th state auditor of Minnesota on January 2, 1979.

=== Results ===
Minnesota State Auditor election, 1978
Party	Candidate	Votes	%
Republican	Arne Carlson	773,150	51.83
Democratic (DFL)	Robert W. Mattson Jr. (incumbent)	695,943	46.66
Communist	Helen S. Kruth	22,576	1.51
Total votes		1,491,669	100.00
Republican gain from Democratic (DFL)			
