= Adolph Biermann =

American politician (1842–1914)

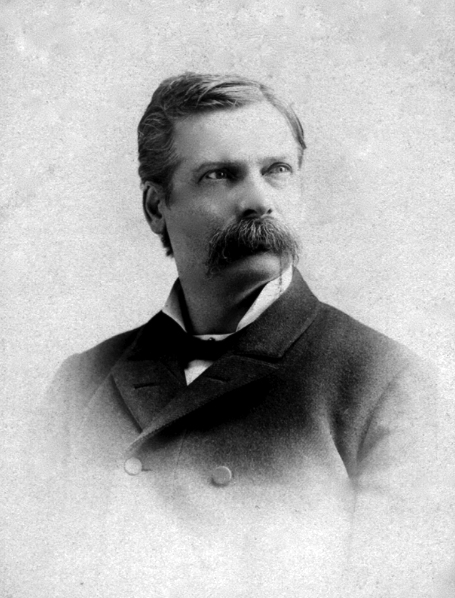

5th Auditor of Minnesota
- In office 1891–1895
- Preceded by: William W. Braden
- Succeeded by: Robert C. Dunn

Personal details
- Born: November 19, 1842 Christiania, Norway
- Died: January 5, 1914 (aged 71) Rochester, Minnesota, U.S.
- Party: Democratic
- Occupation: Politician, farmer

Military service
- Allegiance: United States (Union)
- Branch/service: United States Army (Union army)
- Unit: 24th Wisconsin Infantry Regiment
- Battles/wars: American Civil War; Battle of Perryville; Battle of Stones River

Adolph Biermann (November 19, 1842 – January 5, 1914) was an American farmer and politician who served as the fifth state auditor of Minnesota from 1891 to 1895 as a member of the Democratic Party.

== Biography ==
Born in Christiania, Norway, Biermann emigrated to the United States in 1862. He first settled in Milwaukee, Wisconsin and served in the 24th Wisconsin Volunteer Infantry Regiment, during the American Civil War, until 1865. He was involved in the Battle of Perryville and Battle of Stones River. In 1866, he moved to Rochester, Minnesota, worked as a bookkeeper and settled on a farm. In 1874, Biermann was elected Auditor of Olmsted County, Minnesota. Biermann ran for Governor of Minnesota in 1883, as a replacement for William W. McNair, receiving about 43% of the vote. He also ran for Minnesota Secretary of State, and the United States House of Representatives as a Democrat losing the elections. In 1885, President Grover Cleveland appointed Biermann the United States Collector of Internal Revenue for Minnesota. From 1891 to 1895, Biermann served as Minnesota State Auditor. In 1907 he sold his Rochester home and farm to Charlie Mayo. The Bierman farm became the center of the Mayowood Estate. He died in Rochester, Minnesota, of a stroke.

== Electoral history ==
=== 1890 ===
1890 Minnesota State Auditor election
Party	Candidate	Votes	%
Democratic	Adolph Biermann	130,857	54.75
Republican	Peter (P.J.) McGuire	97,659	40.86
Prohibition	Ole Kron	10,476	4.38
Total votes		238,992	100.00
Democratic gain from Republican			

=== 1894 ===
1894 Minnesota State Auditor election
Party	Candidate	Votes	%
Republican	Robert C. (R.C.) Dunn	148,281	51.23
Democratic	Adolph Biermann (incumbent)	76,737	26.51
People's	Andrew L. Stromberg	55,411	19.14
Prohibition	Seth S. Johnson	9,007	3.11
Total votes		289,436	100.00
Republican gain from Democratic			

Party political offices
Preceded by Richard W. Johnson	Democratic nominee for Governor of Minnesota; 1883	Succeeded by A. A. Ames
Political offices
Preceded by William W. Braden	Minnesota State Auditor; 1891–1895	Succeeded by Robert C. Dunn
