= Minnesota Executive Council =

Elected political office in Minnesota, United States

Council overview
- Formed: April 25, 1925 (99 years ago)
- Jurisdiction: Government of Minnesota
- Headquarters: Saint Paul, Minnesota
- Website: Official page

The Minnesota Executive Council is the council of state of the U.S. state of Minnesota. The Executive Council is currently constituted under Chapter 9 of Minnesota Statutes and has been in continuous existence since 1925.

== Composition ==
The Executive Council is composed of Minnesota's five constitutional officers: the governor, the lieutenant governor, the secretary of state, the state auditor, and the attorney general. The governor, lieutenant governor, and the commissioner of the Department of Administration are ex officio chairperson, vice chairperson, and nonvoting executive secretary of the council, respectively. The Executive Council meets upon the call of the governor or upon the call of the executive secretary at the written request of three or more members.

== Powers and duties ==
The Executive Council is the successor to the Board of Timber Commissioners, the State Board of Deposit, the State Board of Relief, and the State Land Commissioner. It is generally charged with matters of state finance, emergency management, and administration of the state's public lands.

=== State finance ===
The Executive Council designates banks, trust companies and credit unions as depositories for the safekeeping of state funds. In addition, the council advises the management and budget commissioner on the issuance of state debt and settles claims between the state of Minnesota and the United States government.

=== Emergency management ===
The Executive Council has the statutory authority to declare, extend, amend, or revoke states of emergency on the proposal of the governor. The council may also grant property tax relief to local governments in the aftermath of natural disasters. The council is otherwise directed by law to take all measures necessary to prevent emergencies and natural disasters from occurring, including relocating the legislature in the event of disease or imminent attack.

=== Public lands ===
The Executive Council authorizes timber harvests on the public domain, rents state property, and sells state land. Moreover, the council selects in lieu lands from the federal government for the Permanent School Fund and grants permits to prospect for minerals and drain wetlands. However, perhaps the council's most widely known land management responsibility is to examine and approve leases of state lands. The council's leasing authority extends to no only upland leases for dams or submerged leases for ports and harbors, but also to mineral leases of sand, gravel, clay, rock, marl, peat, black dirt, iron ore, taconite, and other mineral deposits underlying public lands owned by the state.
