= 1982 Minnesota State Auditor election =

- November 2, 1982
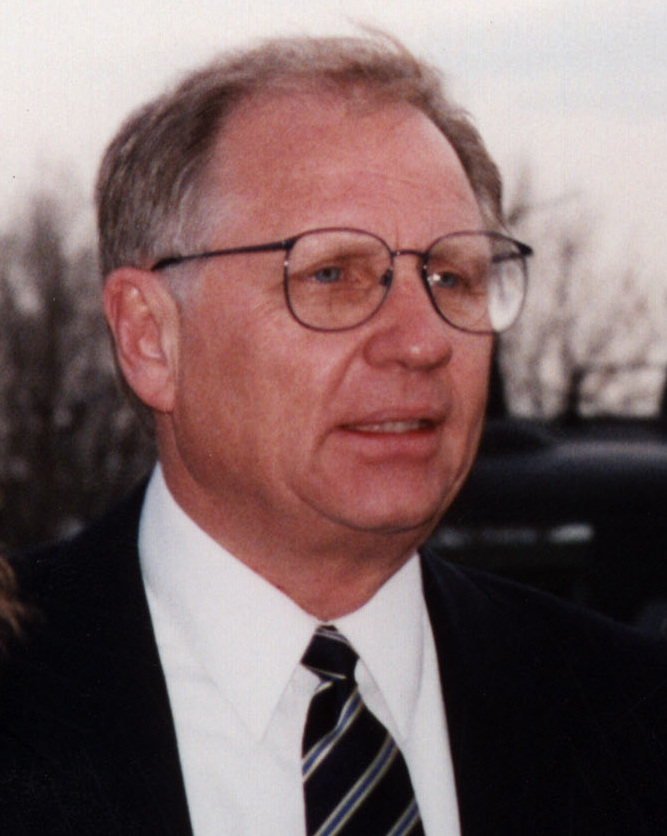

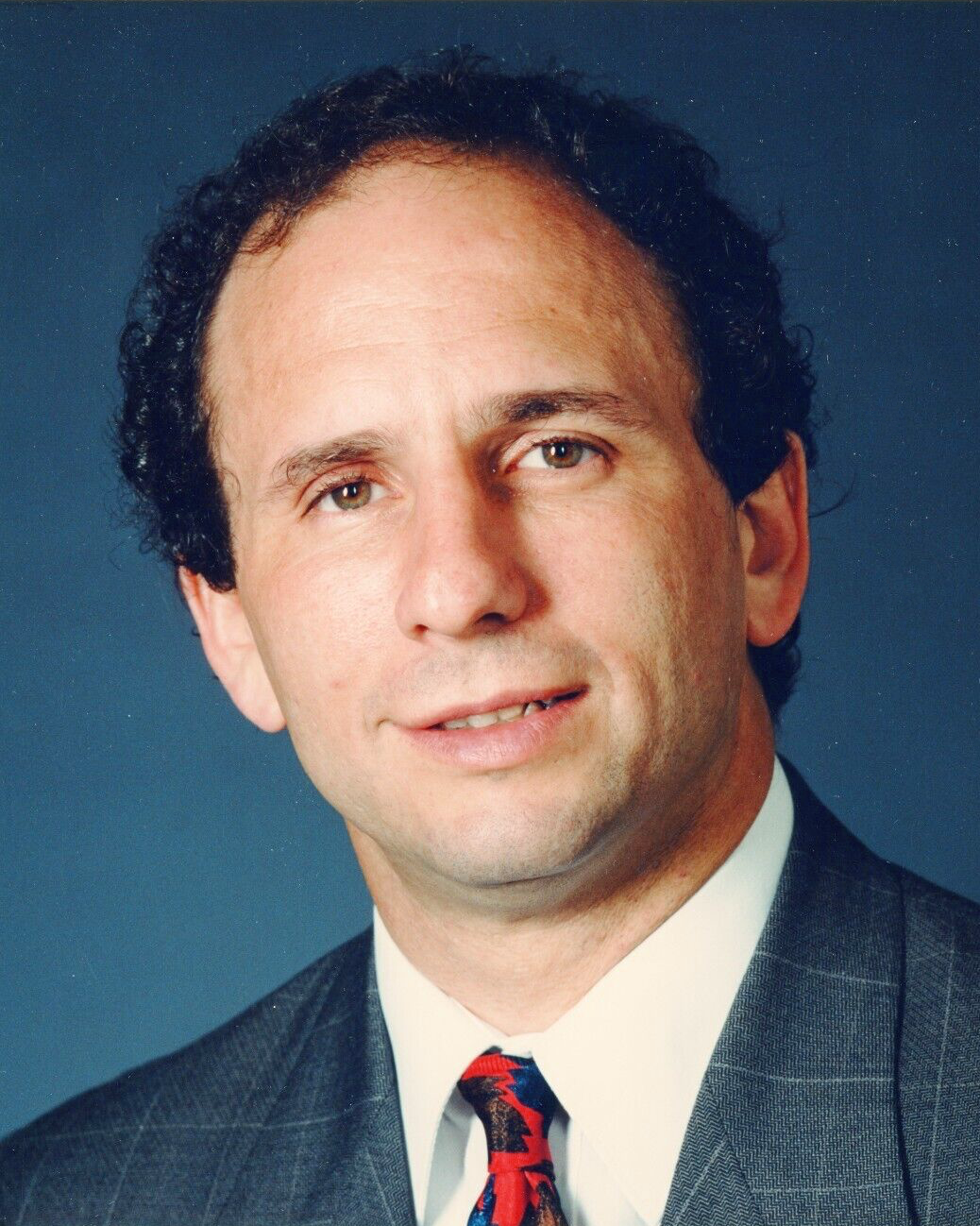
| Nominee | Arne Carlson | Paul Wellstone |
| Party | Ind.-Republican | Democratic (DFL) |
| Popular vote | 932,925 | 769,254 |
| Percentage | 54.81% | 45.19% |
- County results Carlson: 50–60% 60–70% 70–80% Wellstone: 50–60% 60–70%
State Auditor before election
Arne Carlson
Republican
Elected State Auditor
Arne Carlson
Ind.-Republican

The 1982 Minnesota State Auditor election was held on November 2, 1982, in order to elect the state auditor of Minnesota. Independent Republican nominee and incumbent state auditor Arne Carlson defeated Democratic–Farmer–Labor nominee Paul Wellstone.

== General election ==
On election day, November 2, 1982, Independent Republican nominee Arne Carlson won re-election by a margin of 163,671 votes against his opponent Democratic–Farmer–Labor nominee Paul Wellstone, thereby retaining Republican control over the office of state auditor. Carlson was sworn in for his second term on January 3, 1983.

=== Results ===
Minnesota State Auditor election, 1982
| Party | Candidate | Votes | % |
|---|---|---|---|
| Ind.-Republican | Arne Carlson (incumbent) | 932,925 | 54.81 |
| Democratic (DFL) | Paul Wellstone | 769,254 | 45.19 |
| Total votes | | 1,702,179 | 100.00 |
| Ind.-Republican hold | | | |
