= Robert G. Dunn =

American politician and businessman (1923–2017)

Robert G. Dunn (January 25, 1923 – March 15, 2017) was an American politician and businessman.

== Biography ==
Born in Minneapolis, Minnesota, Dunn served in the United States Marine Corps during World War II and the Korean War. In 1948, Dunn received his bachelor's degree in political science from Amherst College. Dunn worked as a lumber dealer and building contractor in Princeton, Minnesota. He served on the Princeton City Planning Commission. Dunn was a Republican. From 1965 to 1972, Dunn served in the Minnesota House of Representatives. He then served in the Minnesota Senate from 1973 until 1980 when he resigned from the Minnesota Legislature. From 1980 to 1985, Dunn was director and chair of the Minnesota Waste Management Board. His grandfather, Robert C. Dunn, also served in the Minnesota Legislature. Dunn died at his home in Princeton, Minnesota.
