= 1986 Minnesota State Auditor election =

- November 4, 1986
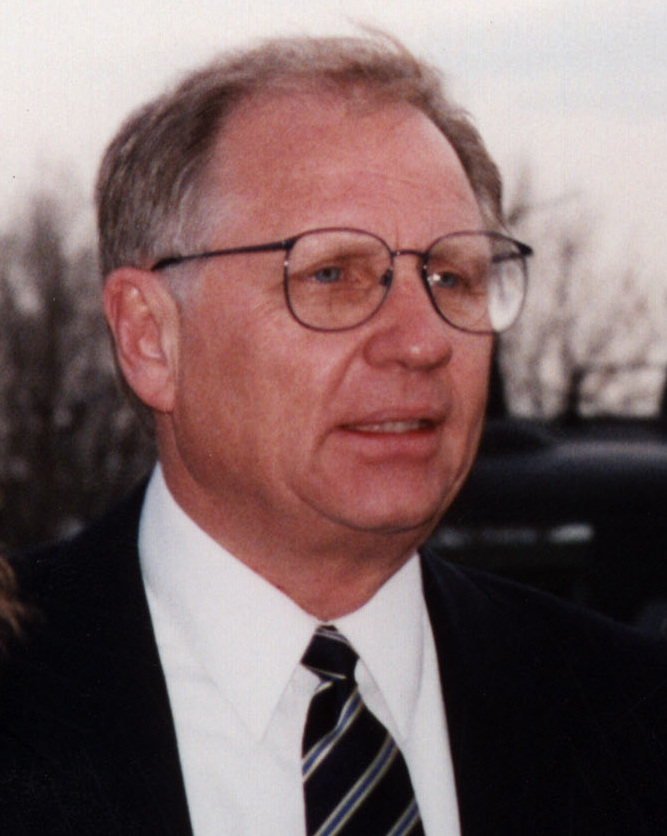

Nominee	Arne Carlson	John Dooley
Party	Ind.-Republican	Democratic (DFL)
Popular vote	747,219	608,913
Percentage	55.10%	44.90%
- County results Carlson: 50–60% 60–70% Dooley: 50–60% 60–70%
State Auditor before election
Arne Carlson
Ind.-Republican
Elected State Auditor
Arne Carlson
Ind.-Republican

The 1986 Minnesota State Auditor election was held on November 4, 1986, in order to elect the State Auditor of Minnesota. Independent Republican nominee and incumbent State Auditor Arne Carlson defeated Democratic–Farmer–Labor nominee John Dooley.

As of 2025 this is the most recent election of which the incumbent Auditor won a third term.

== General election ==
On election day, November 4, 1986, Independent Republican nominee Arne Carlson won re-election by a margin of 138,306 votes against his opponent Democratic–Farmer–Labor nominee John Dooley, thereby retaining Republican control over the office of state auditor. Carlson was sworn in for his third term on January 3, 1987.

=== Results ===
Minnesota State Auditor election, 1986
Party	Candidate	Votes	%
Ind.-Republican	Arne Carlson (incumbent)	747,219	55.10
Democratic (DFL)	John Dooley	608,913	44.90
Total votes		1,356,132	100.00
Ind.-Republican hold			
