= Minnesota Department of Administration =

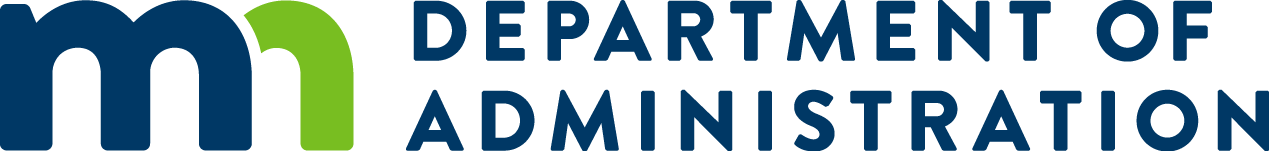

Agency overview
- Jurisdiction: Minnesota
- Headquarters: 200 Administration Building, 50 Sherburne Avenue; Saint Paul, Minnesota
- Employees: 475
- Annual budget: $176.5 million
- Agency executive: Tamar Gronvall, Commissioner
- Website: https://mn.gov/admin/

The Minnesota Department of Administration (Admin) is a cabinet-level agency and the central housekeeping department for the whole of state government. Admin is the successor to the Commission of Administration and Finance, which was split into the Department of Administration and the Management and Finance Bureau in the Governor's Office by an act of the Minnesota Legislature in 1939.

== Key functions ==
=== Facilities management ===
With $176.5 million in annual operating costs and 475 employees, the Department of Administration is broadly responsible for managing state buildings, vehicles, and improved grounds. This role entails providing centralized mail and fleet transportation services to state agencies, insuring state assets, and operating the state's motor pool. Admin also constructs, maintains, and operates state buildings, parking lots, and the Minnesota State Capitol Mall. It was in its capacity as the state's property administrator that the department managed and oversaw the $310 million Minnesota State Capitol building renovation.

=== General services ===
Separately, the Department of Administration functions as the general services administrator to Minnesota's executive branch. In this capacity, Admin administers worker's compensation to state employees, publishes the Minnesota State Register, enforces data practices compliance across state government, and procures goods and services for state agencies, other than the University of Minnesota system which has institutional purchasing autonomy. Moreover, the department coordinates strategic planning in the state executive branch, evaluates the efficiency and effectiveness of state agency operations, and recommends executive branch reorganizations to the governor. State agencies rely on Admin for these and other basic line services in order to fulfill their statutory program responsibilities.

== Other responsibilities ==
Among other miscellaneous responsibilities, the department houses the Minnesota State Demographic Center, the Office of the State Archaeologist, and the Minnesota State Historic Preservation Office. Likewise, Admin provides administrative support services to several attached state agencies, including the Capitol Area Architectural and Planning Board, the Executive Council, the Governor's Council on Developmental Disabilities, and the State Board of Investment.
