= 1883 Minnesota gubernatorial election =

- November 6, 1883
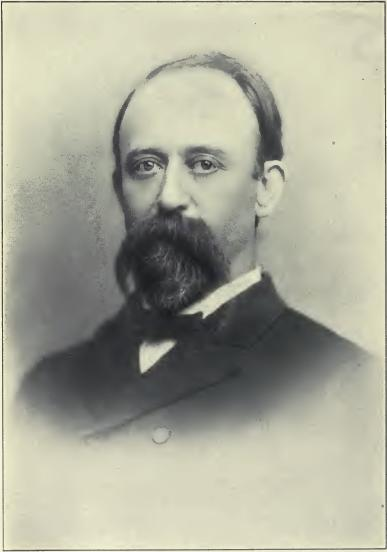

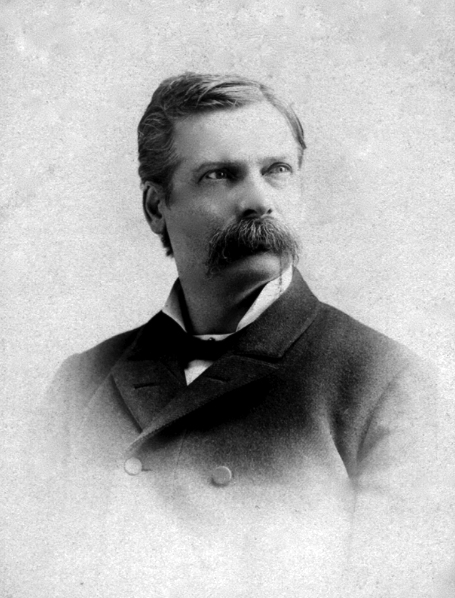
Nominee	Lucius Frederick Hubbard	Adolph Biermann
Party	Republican	Democratic
Popular vote	72,462	58,251
Percentage	53.37%	42.90%
- County results Hubbard: 50−60% 60−70% 70−80% 80−90% 90−100% Biermann: 50−60% 60−70% 70−80% No data/vote
Governor before election
Lucius Frederick Hubbard
Republican
Elected Governor
Lucius Frederick Hubbard
Republican

The 1883 Minnesota gubernatorial election was held on November 6, 1883, to elect the governor of Minnesota. Incumbent governor Lucius Frederick Hubbard was elected to a second term.

== Candidates ==
- Adolph Biermann, auditor of Olmsted County (Democrat)
- Charles Evans Holt, Civil War veteran (Prohibition)
- Lucius Frederick Hubbard, incumbent (Republican)

== Campaigns ==
Hubbard was renominated unanimously and with no opposition at the Republican State Convention, on June 27, 1883.

The Democratic State Convention was held on August 17, 1883. Biermann was unanimously elected by the convention, after the original nominee, William W. McNair, declined to continue his campaign. McNair refused to run due to fears of another Republican victory.

The Scandinavian vote began to shift away from the Republican party in this election. However, an influx of Irish voters, strongly Republican, would offset this, and therefore both demographics were largely unable to change the results of this election.

== Results ==
Minnesota gubernatorial election, 1883
Party	Candidate	Votes	%
Republican	Lucius Frederick Hubbard (incumbent)	72,462	53.37
Democratic	Adolph Biermann	58,251	42.90
Prohibition	Charles E. Holt	4,294	3.63
	Write-Ins	138	0.10
Total votes		135,145	100
Republican hold			
