= Local government in Minnesota =

System of local government

The U.S. state of Minnesota currently has 3,672 local government entities operating in its borders. These are either counties, towns, cities, school districts, or other special-purpose districts. In addition to the current levels of local government, villages and one borough historically also existed in the state, but they have all been abolished.

== History ==
In 1952, Minnesota had the most local government entities of any state, numbering 9,025. However, by 2012, it had declined to eighth place, with 3,672 active entities.

== Current entities ==
=== Counties ===
There are 87 counties in the state of Minnesota. Ramsey County obtained home rule by an act of the Minnesota State Legislature in 1992.

=== Towns ===
Eighty-four of the state's 87 counties are divided into towns, which number 1,784 in the state as of 2012 and are equivalent to the civil townships in several other states; the terms "town" and "township" are used interchangeably in Minnesota. The three counties lacking town government are Koochiching and Lake of the Woods, where the survey townships no longer serve administrative functions, and Hennepin County, where all municipalities are cities. The towns' boundaries have been fixed since March 1, 1906, unless duly changed by their county.

Towns are corporate entities, having among other things the right to sue and own property. The governing body of the town is the town board; in addition, the electors of the town may vote on one of several issues in an annual town meeting.

=== Cities ===
All municipalities in the state are cities, of which there are 853 in the state as of 2012. A city may or may not exist within the boundaries of a town. Cities are currently divided into four classes based on population:

- First class: More than 100,000 inhabitants
- Second class: Between 20,000 and 100,000 inhabitants
- Third class: Between 10,000 and 20,000 inhabitants
- Fourth class: Not more than 10,000 inhabitants

Some cities, known as charter cities, have adopted home rule charters; all others are known as statutory cities.

=== School districts ===
There are 343 public school systems in the state as of 2012. Each district is either a common school district, an independent school district, or a special school district. All three are headed by an elected school board and can levy taxes and issue bonds.

=== Special districts ===
There are 610 local governments in the state that have special uses as of 2012. They include ambulance districts, the East Lake Clinical District, housing and redevelopment agencies, mental health collaboratives, the Metropolitan Mosquito Control District, and sanitary districts.

== Former entities ==
=== Villages ===
Villages existed in the state prior to the enactment of the Uniform Code of Municipal Government in 1973. Villages were differentiated between "separated" and "unseparated" depending on whether they were considered a part of their town and therefore whether its residents had to pay town taxes and could vote in town elections. Villages incorporated prior to April 1949 were unseparated absent a referendum for separation, while villages incorporated afterwards were all separated. Former villages may continue to refer to themselves as "villages" in internal affairs and communications but are referred to as cities in legal proceedings.

=== Boroughs ===
Belle Plaine in Scott County was incorporated as a borough by a special act of the State Legislature in 1868 and remained so until it became a city in 1974. During that time it was the only borough in the state, and had the same roles and responsibilities as a village.

== Works cited ==
- United States Census Bureau (1954). Local Government structure in the United States (Report).
- United States Census Bureau (September 2013). Individual State Descriptions: 2013 (PDF) (Report).
- Minnesota Legislature. "2020 Minnesota Statutes". Minnesota Legislature Revisor's Office.
