= William F. Dunbar =

American politician (1820–1890)

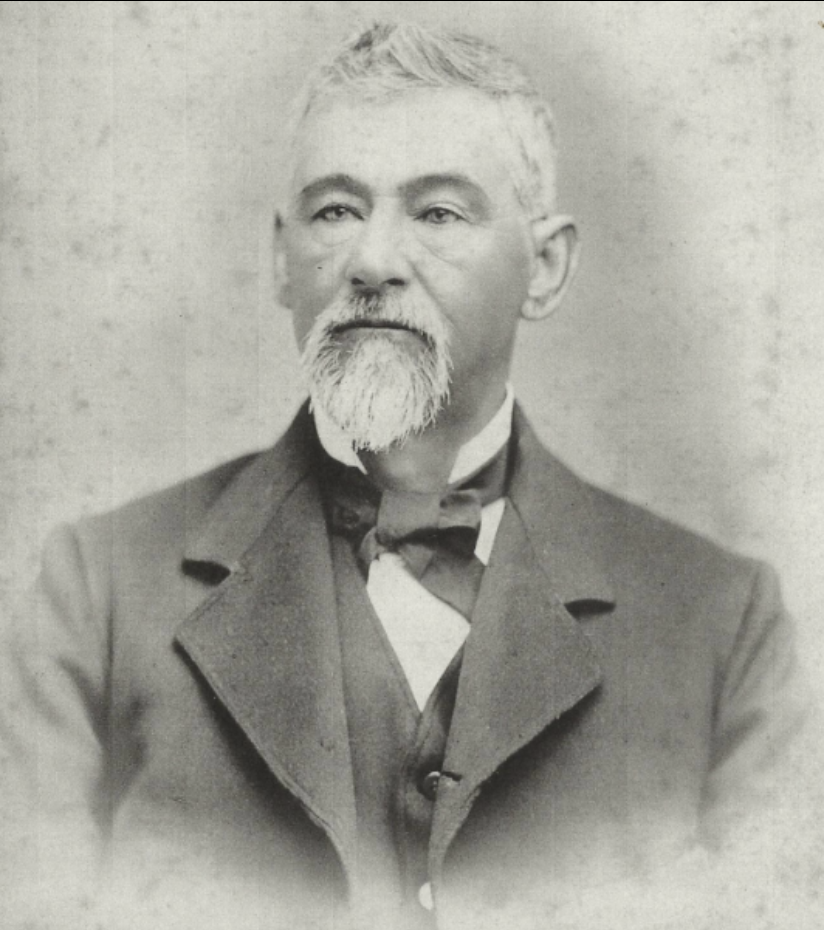

1st Minnesota State Auditor
- In office 1858–1861
- Preceded by: Position created
- Succeeded by: Charles McIlrath

Personal details
- Born: William Franklin Dunbar; November 8, 1820 Westerly, Rhode Island, U.S.
- Died: April 28, 1890 (aged 69)
- Resting place: Evergreen Cemetery, Houston, Minnesota, U.S.
- Party: Democratic
- Profession: Politician, farmer

William Franklin Dunbar (November 8, 1820 – April 28, 1890) was an American politician.

Born in Westerly, Rhode Island, he moved to Caledonia, Minnesota in 1854 and was a farmer. He served in the Minnesota Territorial House of Representatives in 1856-1857. From 1858-1861, Dunbar served as the first Minnesota State Auditor.

Dunbar died on April 28, 1890.

== Notes ==
Political offices
Preceded by new office	Minnesota State Auditor; 1858–1861	Succeeded by Charles McIlrath
