= Government Auditing Standards =

Standards for auditors of U.S government agencies

The Generally Accepted Government Auditing Standards (GAGAS), commonly referred to as the "Yellow Book", are produced in the United States by the Government Accountability Office (GAO).

The standards apply to both financial and performance audits of government agencies. Five general standards are included:

- Independence
- Due care
- Continuing professional education (CPE) 80 hours every 2 years, 24 hours directly related to government auditing
- Supervision
- Quality control

The Yellow Book standards are used by auditors who examine the federal government, including the Government Accountability Office, various offices of inspectors general, and others. Many local government performance auditors also use the yellow book standards. In addition, CPA firms that perform local government financial audits that include an A-133 "single audit" must follow yellow book standards.

In addition to financial audits, the Yellow Book standards cover Performance Audits, which evaluate the performance of a program or project against defined objectives, such as objectives for efficiency and effectiveness.

The Yellow Book standards provide auditors with a framework for behaving ethically. It outlines five key principles:

1. The public interest
2. Integrity
3. Objectivity
4. Proper use of government information, resources, and positions
5. Professional behavior

== Other government auditing standards, used by supreme audit institutions ==
The International Organization of Supreme Audit Institutions (INTOSAI) has developed the INTOSAI Auditing Standards
