= Robert C. Dunn =

American politician (1855–1918)

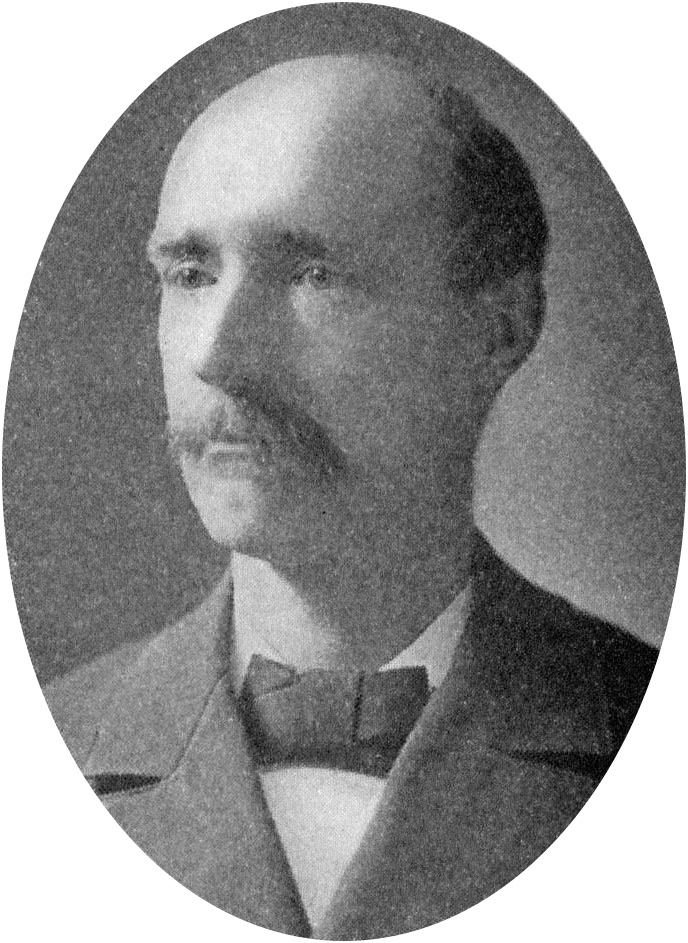
- Dunn, pre-1904

Member of the Minnesota State Senate
- In office 1915 – October 28, 1918

6th Auditor of Minnesota
- In office 1895–1903
- Preceded by: Adolph Biermann
- Succeeded by: Samuel G. Iverson

Member of the Minnesota House of Representatives
- In office 1889; 1890; 1893; 1894; 1911–1914

Personal details
- Born: Robert Campbell Dunn; February 14, 1855 Plumbridge, County Tyrone, Ireland
- Died: October 28, 1918 (aged 63) Princeton, Minnesota, U.S.
- Party: Republican
- Relatives: Robert G. Dunn (grandson)
- Occupation: Politician, businessman, attorney

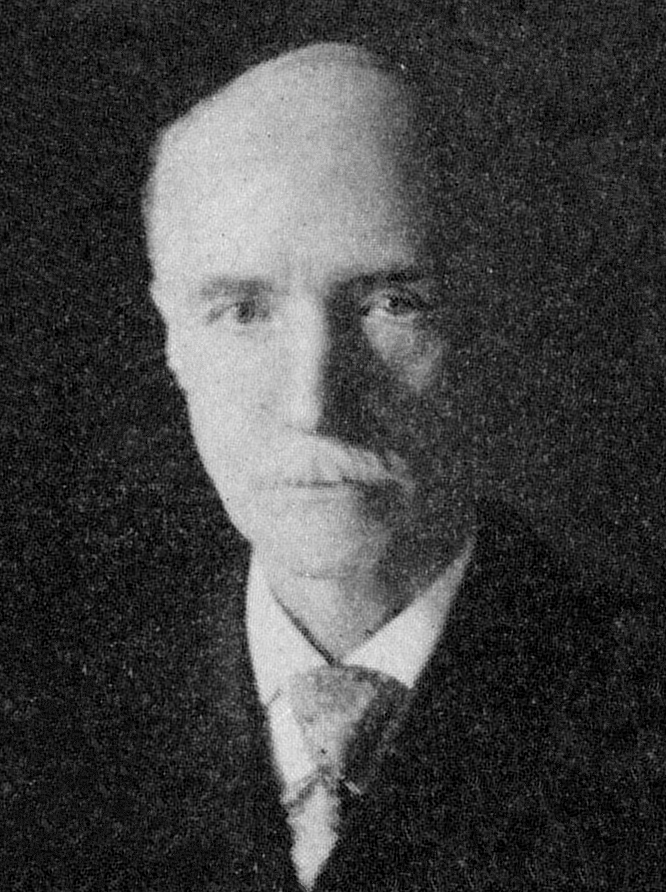
Robert C. Dunn, pre 1918

Robert Campbell Dunn (February 14, 1855 – October 28, 1918) was an Irish-born American politician and businessman.

Born in Plumbridge, County Tyrone, Ireland, Dunn emigrated to the United States in 1870 and settled in Princeton, Minnesota in 1876. Dunn was the editor and publisher of The Princeton Union newspaper. He served as town clerk for Princeton, Minnesota from 1878 to 1889 and as county attorney for Mille Lacs County, Minnesota from 1884 to 1886. Dunn was a Republican. In 1889 and 1890, 1893 and 1894 and from 1911 to 1914, Dunn served in the Minnesota House of Representatives. Then, Dunn served as Minnesota State Auditor from 1895 to 1903. Then, Dunn served in the Minnesota State Senate from 1915 until his death on October 28, 1918. Dunn died at his home in Princeton, Minnesota. His grandson Robert G. Dunn also served in the Minnesota Legislature.

Party political offices
Preceded by Samuel Rinnah Van Sant	Republican nominee for Governor of Minnesota; 1904	Succeeded by A. L. Cole
Political offices
Preceded by Adolph Biermann	Minnesota State Auditor; 1895 – 1903	Succeeded by Samuel G. Iverson
