= Ray P. Chase =

American politician (1880–1948)

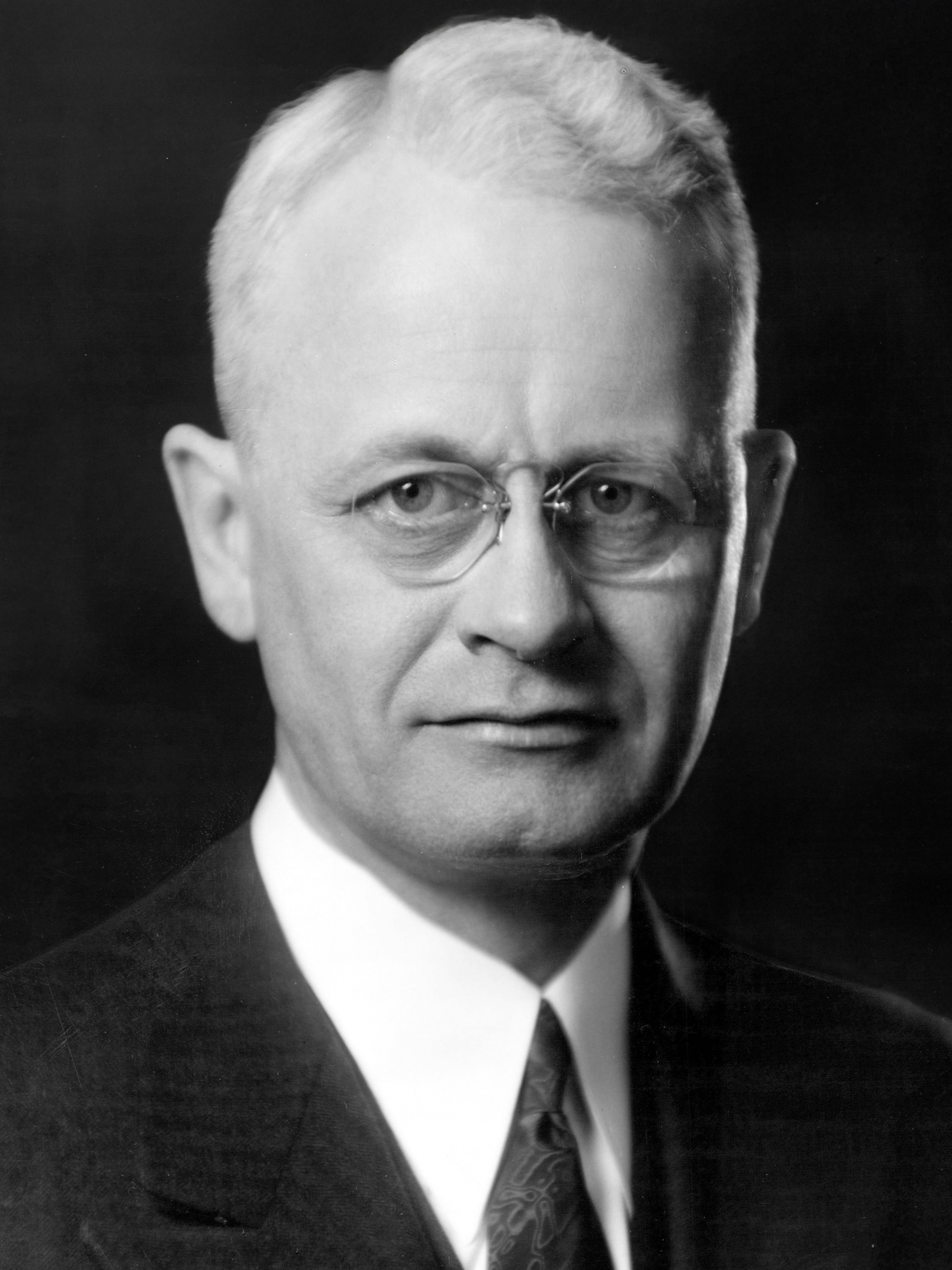
- Chase in 1930

Member of the U.S. House of Representatives from Minnesota's at-large district
- In office March 4, 1933 – January 3, 1935
- Preceded by: District established
- Succeeded by: District abolished

9th Minnesota State Auditor
- In office 1921–1931
- Governor: J. A. O. Preus; Theodore Christianson
- Preceded by: J. A. O. Preus
- Succeeded by: Stafford King

Personal details
- Born: Raymond Park Chase; March 12, 1880 Anoka County, Minnesota, U.S.
- Died: September 18, 1948 (aged 68) Anoka, Minnesota, U.S.
- Party: Republican
- Education: University of Minnesota; St. Paul College of Law
- Profession: Attorney, judge

Raymond Park Chase (March 12, 1880 – September 18, 1948) was an American politician who served as a United States representative from Minnesota and as Minnesota State Auditor.

== Life and career ==
Chase was born in Anoka County, Minnesota, on March 12, 1880. He attended the public schools and graduated from the University of Minnesota at Minneapolis in 1903. Chase attended the University of Minnesota Law School in 1904, 1905, 1915, and 1916, but did not graduate. He engaged in the publishing and printing business at Anoka, Minnesota, from 1904 to 1914.

Chase served as municipal judge of Anoka, Minnesota, from 1911 to 1916, and as deputy State auditor and land commissioner of Minnesota from 1916 through 1920. Chase returned to law school at William Mitchell College of Law (then the St. Paul College of Law) and finally graduated in 1919; was admitted to the bar the same year but did not practice. He was elected state auditor as a Republican in 1920, and served through 1931. He stood unsuccessfully as the Republican candidate for Governor of Minnesota in 1930.

Chase was elected as a Republican to the 73rd congress (March 4, 1933 – January 3, 1935) during a period when the state elected all Representatives at-large. He unsuccessfully sought renomination in 1934 when the seats were again broken into districts. After serving in Congress, Chase practiced law, specializing in legal research from 1935 through 1943. From 1944 through 1948 he served as a member of the Minnesota Railroad and Warehouse Commission.

During the 1938 gubernatorial race, Chase authored a book Are They Communists or Catspaws: A Red Baiting Article, trying to prove a link between the incumbent Farmer-Labor Party administration and the Communist Party; however, the book blatantly introduced anti-Semitism into Minnesota politics as all of his examples were addressing Jews. The book helped his side win the election, but it also prompted the Jewish Community Relations Council organization to combat local anti-Semitism.

Chase died in Anoka, Minnesota, on September 18, 1948. He is interred in Forest Hill Cemetery in Anoka.

Party political offices
Preceded by J. A. O. Preus	Republican nominee for Minnesota State Auditor; 1922, 1926	Succeeded by Stafford King
Preceded by Theodore Christianson	Republican nominee for Governor of Minnesota; 1930	Succeeded by Earle Brown
U.S. House of Representatives
Preceded by General Ticket Established	U.S. Representative from Minnesota; General Ticket Seat Two; 1933–1935	Succeeded by General Ticket Abolished
Political offices
Preceded by J. A. O. Preus	State Auditor of Minnesota; 1921–1931	Succeeded by Stafford King
