= Samuel G. Iverson =

American politician (1859–1928)

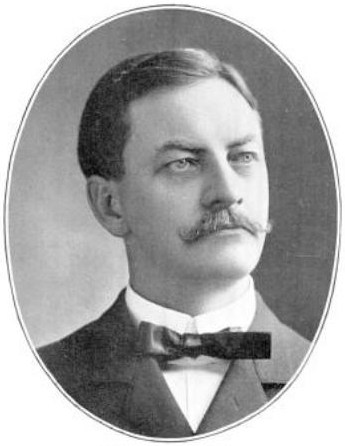

Minnesota State Auditor
- In office 1903–1915
- Preceded by: Robert C. Dunn
- Succeeded by: J. A. O. Preus

Member of the Minnesota House of Representatives
- In office 1887–1888

Personal details
- Born: April 21, 1859 Rushford, Minnesota, U.S.
- Died: March 27, 1928 (aged 68) Saint Paul, Minnesota, U.S.
- Party: Republican
- Spouse: Calista Bentley Retel (m. 1900; died 1912)
- Education: University of Minnesota Law School
- Occupation: Lawyer, businessman, politician

Samuel G. Iverson (April 21, 1859 – March 27, 1928) was an American politician, lawyer, and businessman.

== Biography ==
Born in Rushford, Minnesota, Iverson went to the Rushford public schools and to the Shattuck Military School in Faribault, Minnesota. He worked as a store clerk. He served as postmaster for Rushford, Minnesota from 1881 to 1886. In 1887 and 1888, Iverson served in the Minnesota House of Representatives and was a Republican. He studied law at the University of Minnesota Law School and was admitted to the Minnesota bar in 1893. He served as deputy treasurer and then served as deputy auditor. He served in the Minnesota National Guard with the rank of lieutenant.

He married Calista Bentley Retel on April 24, 1900. She died in 1912.

From 1903 to 1915, Iverson served as Minnesota State Auditor. He ran for the Republican nomination for Governor of Minnesota in 1916, losing to Joseph A. A. Burnquist. He lived in Saint Paul, Minnesota and was involved with the banking business. Iverson died at his sister's house in Saint Paul after a long illness.

== Notes ==
Political offices
| Preceded by Robert C. Dunn | Minnesota State Auditor; 1903 – 1915 | Succeeded by J. A. O. Preus |
