= Stafford King =

American politician (1893–1970)

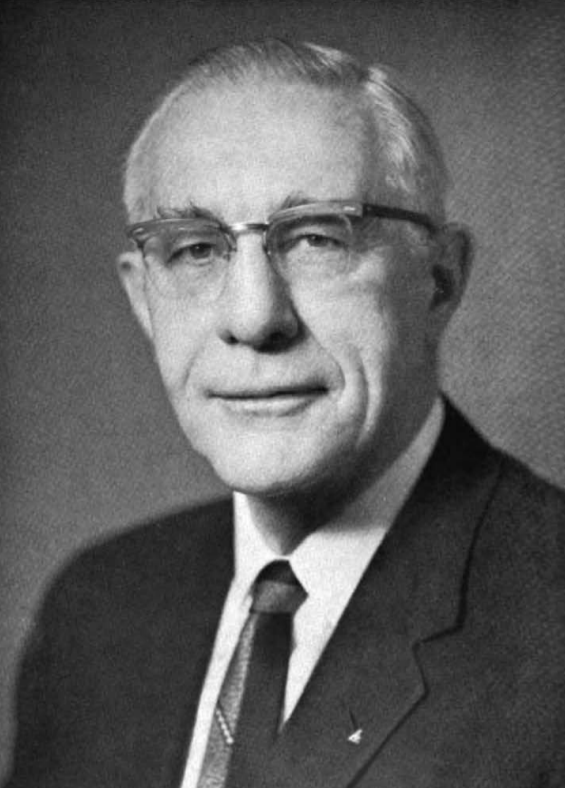
- Stafford King in 1966 or 1967

10th Minnesota State Auditor
- In office January 6, 1931 – March 7, 1969
- Governor: See list: Floyd B. Olson; Hjalmar Petersen; Elmer A. Benson; Harold Stassen; Edward J. Thye; Luther W. Youngdahl; C. Elmer Anderson; Orville L. Freeman; Elmer L. Andersen; Karl F. Rolvaag; Harold LeVander
- Preceded by: Ray P. Chase
- Succeeded by: William O'Brien

Personal details
- Born: October 27, 1893 Fairhaven, Minnesota, U.S.
- Died: August 21, 1970 (aged 76) Ramsey County, Minnesota, U.S.
- Party: Republican
- Spouse: Bertha King

Stafford "Staff" King (October 27, 1893 – August 21, 1970) was a Minnesota Republican politician who served as Minnesota State Auditor for nearly four decades.

== Life and career ==
King was born in 1893 in Fair Haven, Minnesota to Cyrus Murdock King and Minnie King (née Cooper). His parents were the descendants of early settlers of the state and had been involved in local causes and politics in and around Itasca County, Minnesota. He was raised on the family homestead in Itasca County and attended school in Deer River, Minnesota. Later he attended the University of Minnesota and the St. Paul College of Law.

During World War I King served in the army, first as an enlisted soldier on the Mexican border and later as a first lieutenant. After the war he worked in a variety of state and local government positions and also became active with the American Legion. In 1930 he won election as Minnesota State Auditor, a position he held for ten terms. During World War II he left his position on an unpaid leave of absence to serve as a lieutenant colonel with the United States Air Force.

Between his political connections as state auditor and his social connections through various civic and community organizations, King made several attempts to win higher office, most notably running in the Republican primaries for governor against Luther Youngdahl in 1948 and against C. Elmer Anderson in 1952. King's campaign against Youngdahl was centered around deregulation of certain industries, notably a campaign to attempt to legalize gambling. King called the ban an “insidious encroachment of centralized authority upon local, county and state's rights.”

King retired from office in 1969, and died just over a year later in 1970.

Party political offices
Preceded by Ray P. Chase	Republican nominee for Minnesota State Auditor; 1930, 1934, 1938, 1942, 1946, 1950, 1954, 1958, 1962, 1966	Succeeded by Rolland Hatfield
Political offices
Preceded by Ray P. Chase	Minnesota State Auditor; 1931 – 1969	Succeeded by William O'Brien
