= Political party strength in Minnesota =

Politics in the US state of Minnesota

The following table indicates the party of elected officials in the U.S. state of Minnesota:

- Governor
- Lieutenant Governor
- Secretary of State
- Attorney General
- State Auditor
- State Treasurer (before 2003)

The table also indicates the historical party composition in the:

- State Senate
- State House of Representatives
- Delegation to the United States Senate
- Delegation to the United States House of Representatives

For years in which a United States presidential election was held, the table indicates which party's nominees received the state's electoral votes.

Not all legislative vacancies are depicted on this table. (Note: Many vacancies are brief, don't occur during the legislative year, do not change party balance, or are otherwise non-notable. These have been omitted for the sake of brevity.) For additional detail, find the appropriate legislative session at List of Minnesota state legislatures.

== Pre-statehood (1849–1857) ==
Year	Executive offices					Territorial Legislature		United States Congress
Year	Governor	Territorial Secretary	Attorney General	Auditor	Treasurer	Terr. Senate	Terr. House	Delegate
1849	Alexander Ramsey (W) (Note: Territorial governor appointed by President Zachary Taylor.)	Charles K. Smith (W)	Lorenzo A. Babcock (W)	Jonathan E. McKusick (W)	Calvin A. Tuttle (W)	6D, 2W, 1?	12D, 4W, 2?	Henry Hastings Sibley (D) (Note: Delegate to the U.S. House of Representatives from Minnesota Territory.)
1850	Alexander Ramsey (W)	Charles K. Smith (W)	Lorenzo A. Babcock (W)	Jonathan E. McKusick (W)	Calvin A. Tuttle (W)	6D, 2W, 1?	12D, 4W, 2?	Henry Hastings Sibley (D)
1851	Alexander Ramsey (W)	Alexander C. Wilkin (W)	Lorenzo A. Babcock (W)	Jonathan E. McKusick (W)	Calvin A. Tuttle (W)	6D, 2W, 1?	8D, 7?, 3W	Henry Hastings Sibley (D)
1851	Alexander Ramsey (W)	Alexander C. Wilkin (W)	Lorenzo A. Babcock (W)	Jonathan E. McKusick (W)	Calvin A. Tuttle (W)	6D, 2W, 1?	5D, 4?, 2W	Henry Hastings Sibley (D)
1852	Alexander Ramsey (W)	Alexander C. Wilkin (W)	Lorenzo A. Babcock (W)	Abraham Van Vorhes (W)	Calvin A. Tuttle (W)	7D, 2W	10D, 5?, 3W	Henry Hastings Sibley (D)
1853	Willis A. Gorman (D) (Note: Territorial governor appointed by President Franklin Pierce.)	Joseph Rosser (D)	LaFayette Emmett (D)	Socrates Nelson (D)	George W. Prescott (D)	7D, 2W	13D, 3W, 2?	Henry M. Rice (D)
1854	Willis A. Gorman (D)	Joseph Rosser (D)	LaFayette Emmett (D)	Julius Georgii (D)	Charles E. Leonard (D)	9D	13D, 5W	Henry M. Rice (D)
1855	Willis A. Gorman (D)	Joseph Rosser (D)	LaFayette Emmett (D)	Julius Georgii (D)	Charles E. Leonard (D)	9D	13D, 4?, 1R	Henry M. Rice (D)
1856	Willis A. Gorman (D)	Joseph Rosser (D)	LaFayette Emmett (D)	Julius Georgii (D)	Charles E. Leonard (D)	9D, 4?, 2R	18D, 12R, 9?	Henry M. Rice (D)
1856	Willis A. Gorman (D)	Joseph Rosser (D)	LaFayette Emmett (D)	Julius Georgii (D)	Charles E. Leonard (D)	8D, 4?, 2R	19D, 11R, 9?	Henry M. Rice (D)
1856	Willis A. Gorman (D)	Joseph Rosser (D)	LaFayette Emmett (D)	Julius Georgii (D)	Charles E. Leonard (D)	6D, 4?, 2R	19D, 11R, 9?	Henry M. Rice (D)
1857	Samuel Medary (D) (Note: Territorial governor appointed by President James Buchanan.)	Charles L. Chase (D)	LaFayette Emmett (D)	Julius Georgii (D)	George W. Armstrong (D)	6D, 5R, 4?	20R, 18D	William W. Kingsbury (D)
1857	Samuel Medary (D)	Charles L. Chase (D)	LaFayette Emmett (D)	Julius Georgii (D)	George W. Armstrong (D)	6D, 5R, 4?	20R, 19D	William W. Kingsbury (D)
1857	Samuel Medary (D)	Charles L. Chase (D)	LaFayette Emmett (D)	Julius Georgii (D)	George W. Armstrong (D)	6D, 5R, 4?	19R, 19D	William W. Kingsbury (D)
1857	Samuel Medary (D)	Charles L. Chase (D)	LaFayette Emmett (D)	Julius Georgii (D)	George W. Armstrong (D)	6D, 5R, 4?	20R, 19D	William W. Kingsbury (D)
1857	Samuel Medary (D)	Charles L. Chase (D)	LaFayette Emmett (D)	Julius Georgii (D)	George W. Armstrong (D)	20D, 17R	43D, 37R	William W. Kingsbury (D)

== 1858–2002 ==
Year	Executive offices						State Legislature		Judicial	United States Congress			Electoral votes
Year	Governor	Lt. Governor	Secretary of State	Attorney General	Auditor	Treasurer	State Senate	State House	Clerk of the Supreme Court	U.S. Senator (Class I)	U.S. Senator (Class II)	U.S. House	Electoral votes
1858	Henry Hastings Sibley (D)	William Holcombe (D)	Francis Baasen (D)	Charles H. Berry (D)	William F. Dunbar (D)	George W. Armstrong (D)	20D, 17R	43D, 37R	Jacob J. Noah (D)	Henry M. Rice (D)	James Shields (D)	2D	
1859	Henry Hastings Sibley (D)	William Holcombe (D)	Francis Baasen (D)	Charles H. Berry (D)	William F. Dunbar (D)	George W. Armstrong (D)	19D, 18R (Note: Although legislators were elected, it was determined that an 1858-59 session was unnecessary due to the protracted length of the 1857-58 session; hence, these legislators never convened and were never sworn in.)	49R, 31D	Jacob J. Noah (D)	Henry M. Rice (D)	Morton S. Wilkinson (R)	2R	
1860	Alexander Ramsey (R) (Note: Resigned to become U.S. Senator.)	Ignatius L. Donnelly (R) (Note: Resigned.)	James H. Baker (R)	Gordon E. Cole (R)	William F. Dunbar (D)	Charles Scheffer (R)	23R, 13D, 1I	58R, 22D	Jacob J. Noah (D)	Henry M. Rice (D)	Morton S. Wilkinson (R)	2R	Lincoln/ Hamlin (R) ✓
1861	Alexander Ramsey (R)	Ignatius L. Donnelly (R)	James H. Baker (R)	Gordon E. Cole (R)	Charles McIlrath (R)	Charles Scheffer (R)	19R, 2D	40R, 2D	Andrew J. Van Vorhes (R)	Henry M. Rice (D)	Morton S. Wilkinson (R)	2R	Lincoln/ Hamlin (R) ✓
1862	Alexander Ramsey (R)	Ignatius L. Donnelly (R)	David Blakeley (R)	Gordon E. Cole (R)	Charles McIlrath (R)	Charles Scheffer (R)	16R, 5D	30R, 10D, 2UD	Andrew J. Van Vorhes (R)	Henry M. Rice (D)	Morton S. Wilkinson (R)	2R	Lincoln/ Hamlin (R) ✓
1863	Alexander Ramsey (R)	Henry A. Swift (R) (Note: Succeeded to office following death or resignation of previous officeholder.)	David Blakeley (R)	Gordon E. Cole (R)	Charles McIlrath (R)	Charles Scheffer (R)	16R, 5D	29R, 12D, 1UD	Andrew J. Van Vorhes (R)	Henry M. Rice (D)	Morton S. Wilkinson (R)	2R	Lincoln/ Hamlin (R) ✓
1863	Henry A. Swift (R)	vacant	David Blakeley (R)	Gordon E. Cole (R)	Charles McIlrath (R)	Charles Scheffer (R)	16R, 5D	29R, 12D, 1UD	Andrew J. Van Vorhes (R)	Alexander Ramsey (R)	Morton S. Wilkinson (R)	2R	Lincoln/ Hamlin (R) ✓
1864	Stephen Miller (R)	Charles D. Sherwood (R)	David Blakeley (R)	Gordon E. Cole (R)	Charles McIlrath (R)	Charles Scheffer (R)	17R, 4D	27R, 11D, 4UD	George F. Potter (R) (Note: Lost renomination.)	Alexander Ramsey (R)	Morton S. Wilkinson (R)	2R	Lincoln/ Johnson (NU) ✓
1865	Stephen Miller (R)	Charles D. Sherwood (R)	David Blakeley (R)	Gordon E. Cole (R)	Charles McIlrath (R)	Charles Scheffer (R)	17R, 4D	32R, 10D	George F. Potter (R)	Alexander Ramsey (R)	Daniel Sheldon Norton (R) (Note: Died in office.)	2R	Lincoln/ Johnson (NU) ✓
1866	William Rainey Marshall (R)	Thomas H. Armstrong (R)	David Blakeley (R)	William J. Colvill (R)	Charles McIlrath (R)	Charles Scheffer (R)	16R, 5D	29R, 13D	George F. Potter (R)	Alexander Ramsey (R)	Daniel Sheldon Norton (R)	2R	Lincoln/ Johnson (NU) ✓
1867	William Rainey Marshall (R)	Thomas H. Armstrong (R)	David Blakeley (R)	William J. Colvill (R)	Charles McIlrath (R)	Charles Scheffer (R)	17R, 5D	37R, 9D, 1?	Sherwood Hough (R) (Note: Lost renomination.)	Alexander Ramsey (R)	Daniel Sheldon Norton (R)	2R	Lincoln/ Johnson (NU) ✓
1868	William Rainey Marshall (R)	Thomas H. Armstrong (R)	Henry C. Rogers (R)	Francis R. E. Cornell (R)	Charles McIlrath (R)	Emil D. Munch (R)	15R, 7D	34R, 13D	Sherwood Hough (R)	Alexander Ramsey (R)	Daniel Sheldon Norton (R)	2R	Grant/ Colfax (R) ✓
1869	William Rainey Marshall (R)	Thomas H. Armstrong (R)	Henry C. Rogers (R)	Francis R. E. Cornell (R)	Charles McIlrath (R)	Emil D. Munch (R)	16R, 6D	38R, 9D	Sherwood Hough (R)	Alexander Ramsey (R)	Daniel Sheldon Norton (R)	1R, 1D	Grant/ Colfax (R) ✓
1870	Horace Austin (R)	William H. Yale (R)	Hans Mattson (R)	Francis R. E. Cornell (R)	Charles McIlrath (R)	Emil D. Munch (R)	16R, 6D	38R, 9D	Sherwood Hough (R)	Alexander Ramsey (R)	William Windom (R) (Note: Appointed by governor to fill vacancy.)	1R, 1D	Grant/ Colfax (R) ✓
1871	Horace Austin (R)	William H. Yale (R)	Hans Mattson (R)	Francis R. E. Cornell (R)	Charles McIlrath (R)	Emil D. Munch (R)	14R, 8D	27R, 20D	Sherwood Hough (R)	Alexander Ramsey (R)	Ozora P. Stearns (R)	2R	Grant/ Colfax (R) ✓
1871	Horace Austin (R)	William H. Yale (R)	Hans Mattson (R)	Francis R. E. Cornell (R)	Charles McIlrath (R)	Emil D. Munch (R)	14R, 8D	27R, 20D	Sherwood Hough (R)	Alexander Ramsey (R)	William Windom (R) (Note: Resigned to become U.S. Secretary of the Treasury.)	2R	Grant/ Colfax (R) ✓
1872	Horace Austin (R)	William H. Yale (R)	Samuel P. Jennison (R)	Francis R. E. Cornell (R)	Charles McIlrath (R)	William Seeger (R) (Note: Resigned following impeachment but before trial by Minnesota Senate.)	29R, 12D	73R, 33D	Sherwood Hough (R)	Alexander Ramsey (R)	William Windom (R)	2R	Grant/ Wilson (R) ✓
1873	Horace Austin (R)	William H. Yale (R)	Samuel P. Jennison (R)	Francis R. E. Cornell (R)	Orlan P. Whitcomb (R)	Edwin W. Dyke (R) (Note: Appointed by governor to fill vacancy in early 1873. Later elected to office in his own right as a Democrat.)	31R, 10D	79R, 27D	Sherwood Hough (R)	Alexander Ramsey (R)	William Windom (R)	3R	Grant/ Wilson (R) ✓
1874	Cushman K. Davis (R)	Alphonso Barto (R)	Samuel P. Jennison (R)	George P. Wilson (R)	Orlan P. Whitcomb (R)	Edwin W. Dyke (A-M) (Note: Dyke did not win the endorsement of the Republican Party in 1873, but sought the Democratic endorsement and won with it. Dyke himself did not join the Democratic party, but was an Anti-Monopolist)	28R, 13D	58R, 48D	Sherwood Hough (R)	Alexander Ramsey (R)	William Windom (R)	3R	Grant/ Wilson (R) ✓
1875	Cushman K. Davis (R)	Alphonso Barto (R)	Samuel P. Jennison (R)	George P. Wilson (R)	Orlan P. Whitcomb (R)	Edwin W. Dyke (A-M)	21R, 18D, 2I	54R, 48D, 4I	Sherwood Hough (R)	Samuel J. R. McMillan (R)	William Windom (R)	3R	Grant/ Wilson (R) ✓
1876	John S. Pillsbury (R)	James Wakefield (R)	John S. Irgens (R)	George P. Wilson (R)	Orlan P. Whitcomb (R)	William Pfaender (R)	27R, 14D	74R, 32D	Sam Nichols (R) (Note: Lost renomination.)	Samuel J. R. McMillan (R)	William Windom (R)	3R	Hayes/ Wheeler (R) ✓
1877	John S. Pillsbury (R)	James Wakefield (R)	John S. Irgens (R)	George P. Wilson (R)	Orlan P. Whitcomb (R)	William Pfaender (R)	26R, 15D	77R, 29D	Sam Nichols (R)	Samuel J. R. McMillan (R)	William Windom (R)	3R	Hayes/ Wheeler (R) ✓
1878	John S. Pillsbury (R)	James Wakefield (R)	John S. Irgens (R)	George P. Wilson (R)	Orlan P. Whitcomb (R)	William Pfaender (R)	29R, 12D	66R, 40D	Sam Nichols (R)	Samuel J. R. McMillan (R)	William Windom (R)	3R	Hayes/ Wheeler (R) ✓
1879	John S. Pillsbury (R)	James Wakefield (R)	John S. Irgens (R)	George P. Wilson (R)	Orlan P. Whitcomb (R)	William Pfaender (R)	23R, 16D, 2GB (Note: Due to a constitutional amendment, effective with the election of 1878, terms for senators became four years and terms for representatives became two years.)	73R, 30D, 3GB	Sam Nichols (R)	Samuel J. R. McMillan (R)	William Windom (R)	2R, 1D	Hayes/ Wheeler (R) ✓
1880	John S. Pillsbury (R)	Charles A. Gilman (R)	Frederick Von Baumbach (R)	Charles M. Start (R)	Orlan P. Whitcomb (R)	Charles Kittelson (R)	23R, 16D, 2GB	73R, 30D, 3GB	Sam Nichols (R)	Samuel J. R. McMillan (R)	William Windom (R)	2R, 1D	Garfield/ Arthur (R) ✓
1881	John S. Pillsbury (R)	Charles A. Gilman (R)	Frederick Von Baumbach (R)	William John Hahn (R) (Note: Appointed to fill the remainder of the previous officeholder's term. Later elected in their own right.)	Orlan P. Whitcomb (R)	Charles Kittelson (R)	29R, 11D, 1?	87R, 15D, 1?	Sam Nichols (R)	Samuel J. R. McMillan (R)	Alonzo J. Edgerton (R)	3R	Garfield/ Arthur (R) ✓
1882	Lucius Frederick Hubbard (R)	Charles A. Gilman (R)	Frederick Von Baumbach (R)	William John Hahn (R)	William W. Braden (R)	Charles Kittelson (R)	29R, 11D, 1?	87R, 15D, 1?	Sam Nichols (R)	Samuel J. R. McMillan (R)	William Windom (R)	3R	Garfield/ Arthur (R) ✓
1883	Lucius Frederick Hubbard (R)	Charles A. Gilman (R)	Frederick Von Baumbach (R)	William John Hahn (R)	William W. Braden (R)	Charles Kittelson (R)	36R, 10D, 1I	72R, 28D, 2I, 1?	Sam Nichols (R)	Samuel J. R. McMillan (R)	Dwight M. Sabin (R)	5R	Garfield/ Arthur (R) ✓
1884	Lucius Frederick Hubbard (R)	Charles A. Gilman (R)	Frederick Von Baumbach (R)	William John Hahn (R)	William W. Braden (R)	Charles Kittelson (R)	36R, 10D, 1I	72R, 28D, 2I, 1?	Sam Nichols (R)	Samuel J. R. McMillan (R)	Dwight M. Sabin (R)	5R	Blaine/ Logan (R) ✗
1885	Lucius Frederick Hubbard (R)	Charles A. Gilman (R)	Frederick Von Baumbach (R)	William John Hahn (R)	William W. Braden (R)	Charles Kittelson (R)	30R, 17D	70R, 33D	Sam Nichols (R)	Samuel J. R. McMillan (R)	Dwight M. Sabin (R)	5R	Blaine/ Logan (R) ✗
1886	Lucius Frederick Hubbard (R)	Charles A. Gilman (R)	Frederick Von Baumbach (R)	William John Hahn (R)	William W. Braden (R)	Charles Kittelson (R)	30R, 17D	70R, 33D	Sam Nichols (R)	Samuel J. R. McMillan (R)	Dwight M. Sabin (R)	5R	Blaine/ Logan (R) ✗
1887	Andrew Ryan McGill (R)	Albert E. Rice (R)	Hans Mattson (R)	Moses E. Clapp (R)	William W. Braden (R)	Joseph Bobleter (R)	30R, 16D, 1FA	66R, 34D, 3FA	John David Jones (R) (Note: Lost renomination.)	Cushman K. Davis (R)	Dwight M. Sabin (R)	3D, 2R	Blaine/ Logan (R) ✗
1888	Andrew Ryan McGill (R)	Albert E. Rice (R)	Hans Mattson (R)	Moses E. Clapp (R)	William W. Braden (R)	Joseph Bobleter (R)	30R, 16D, 1FA	66R, 34D, 3FA	John David Jones (R)	Cushman K. Davis (R)	Dwight M. Sabin (R)	3D, 2R	Harrison/ Morton (R) ✓
1889	William Rush Merriam (R)	Albert E. Rice (R)	Hans Mattson (R)	Moses E. Clapp (R)	William W. Braden (R)	Joseph Bobleter (R)	30R, 16D, 1FA	89R, 9D, 3I, 2FA	John David Jones (R)	Cushman K. Davis (R)	William D. Washburn (R)	5R	Harrison/ Morton (R) ✓
1890	William Rush Merriam (R)	Albert E. Rice (R)	Hans Mattson (R)	Moses E. Clapp (R)	William W. Braden (R)	Joseph Bobleter (R)	30R, 16D, 1FA	89R, 9D, 3I, 2FA	John David Jones (R)	Cushman K. Davis (R)	William D. Washburn (R)	5R	Harrison/ Morton (R) ✓
1891	William Rush Merriam (R)	Gideon S. Ives (R)	Frederick P. Brown (R)	Moses E. Clapp (R)	Adolph Biermann (D)	Joseph Bobleter (R)	25R, 16D, 13P (Note: Elected a Republican President Pro Tempore, John B. Sanborn, and organized the chamber.)	52D, 43R, 19FA (Note: A coalition of Democrats and members of the Farmers' Alliance organized the chamber and elected an Alliance Speaker, Ezra T. Champlin.)	Charles P. Holcomb (R)	Cushman K. Davis (R)	William D. Washburn (R)	3D, 1R, 1P	Harrison/ Morton (R) ✓
1892	William Rush Merriam (R)	Gideon S. Ives (R)	Frederick P. Brown (R)	Moses E. Clapp (R)	Adolph Biermann (D)	Joseph Bobleter (R)	25R, 16D, 13P	52D, 43R, 19FA	Charles P. Holcomb (R)	Cushman K. Davis (R)	William D. Washburn (R)	3D, 1R, 1P	Harrison/ Reid (R) ✗
1893	Knute Nelson (R)	David Marston Clough (R)	Frederick P. Brown (R)	Henry W. Childs (R)	Adolph Biermann (D)	Joseph Bobleter (R)	25R, 16D, 13P	71R, 41D, 2Pop	Charles P. Holcomb (R)	Cushman K. Davis (R)	William D. Washburn (R)	4R, 2D, 1Pop	Harrison/ Reid (R) ✗
1894	Knute Nelson (R)	David Marston Clough (R)	Frederick P. Brown (R)	Henry W. Childs (R)	Adolph Biermann (D)	Joseph Bobleter (R)	25R, 16D, 13P	71R, 41D, 2Pop	Charles P. Holcomb (R)	Cushman K. Davis (R)	William D. Washburn (R)	4R, 2D, 1Pop	Harrison/ Reid (R) ✗
1895	David Marston Clough (R) (Note: Succeeded to office following death or resignation of previous officeholder. Later elected to office in his or her own right.)	Frank A. Day (R)	Albert Berg (R)	Henry W. Childs (R)	Robert C. Dunn (R)	August T. Koerner (R)	46R, 5Pop, 3D	95R, 10D, 9Pop	Darius F. Reese (R) (Note: Lost renomination.)	Cushman K. Davis (R)	Knute Nelson (R)	7R	Harrison/ Reid (R) ✗
1896	David Marston Clough (R)	Frank A. Day (R)	Albert Berg (R)	Henry W. Childs (R)	Robert C. Dunn (R)	August T. Koerner (R)	46R, 5Pop, 3D	95R, 10D, 9Pop	Darius F. Reese (R)	Cushman K. Davis (R)	Knute Nelson (R)	7R	McKinley/ Hobart (R) ✓
1897	David Marston Clough (R)	John L. Gibbs (R)	Albert Berg (R)	Henry W. Childs (R)	Robert C. Dunn (R)	August T. Koerner (R)	46R, 5Pop, 3D	90R, 13Pop, 11D	Darius F. Reese (R)	Cushman K. Davis (R)	Knute Nelson (R)	7R	McKinley/ Hobart (R) ✓
1898	David Marston Clough (R)	John L. Gibbs (R)	Albert Berg (R)	Henry W. Childs (R)	Robert C. Dunn (R)	August T. Koerner (R)	46R, 5Pop, 3D	90R, 13Pop, 11D	Darius F. Reese (R)	Cushman K. Davis (R)	Knute Nelson (R)	7R	McKinley/ Hobart (R) ✓
1899	John Lind (D) (Note: Had also been endorsed by the Populists/ Silver Republicans.)	Lyndon A. Smith (R)	Albert Berg (R)	Wallace B. Douglas (R) (Note: Resigned following appointment to Minnesota Supreme Court.)	Robert C. Dunn (R)	August T. Koerner (R)	44R, 18D, 1I	93R, 25D, 1I	Darius F. Reese (R)	Cushman K. Davis (R)	Knute Nelson (R)	7R	McKinley/ Hobart (R) ✓
1900	John Lind (D)	Lyndon A. Smith (R)	Albert Berg (R)	Wallace B. Douglas (R)	Robert C. Dunn (R)	August T. Koerner (R)	44R, 18D, 1I	93R, 25D, 1I	Darius F. Reese (R)	Cushman K. Davis (R)	Knute Nelson (R)	7R	McKinley/ Roosevelt (R) ✓
1900	John Lind (D)	Lyndon A. Smith (R)	Albert Berg (R)	Wallace B. Douglas (R)	Robert C. Dunn (R)	August T. Koerner (R)	44R, 18D, 1I	93R, 25D, 1I	Darius F. Reese (R)	Charles A. Towne (D)	Knute Nelson (R)	7R	McKinley/ Roosevelt (R) ✓
1901	Samuel Rinnah Van Sant (R)	Lyndon A. Smith (R)	Peter E. Hanson (R)	Wallace B. Douglas (R)	Robert C. Dunn (R)	Julius H. Block (R)	44R, 18D, 1I	96R, 17D, 6Pop	Darius F. Reese (R)	Moses E. Clapp (R)	Knute Nelson (R)	7R	McKinley/ Roosevelt (R) ✓
1902	Samuel Rinnah Van Sant (R)	Lyndon A. Smith (R)	Peter E. Hanson (R)	Wallace B. Douglas (R)	Robert C. Dunn (R)	Julius H. Block (R)	44R, 18D, 1I	96R, 17D, 6Pop	Darius F. Reese (R)	Moses E. Clapp (R)	Knute Nelson (R)	7R	McKinley/ Roosevelt (R) ✓
1903	Samuel Rinnah Van Sant (R)	Ray W. Jones (R)	Peter E. Hanson (R)	Wallace B. Douglas (R)	Samuel G. Iverson (R)	Julius H. Block (R)	52R, 11D	104R, 15D	C. A. Pidgeon (R)	Moses E. Clapp (R)	Knute Nelson (R)	8R, 1D	McKinley/ Roosevelt (R) ✓
1904	Samuel Rinnah Van Sant (R)	Ray W. Jones (R)	Peter E. Hanson (R)	William J. Donahower (R)	Samuel G. Iverson (R)	Julius H. Block (R)	52R, 11D	104R, 15D	C. A. Pidgeon (R)	Moses E. Clapp (R)	Knute Nelson (R)	8R, 1D	Roosevelt/ Fairbanks (R) ✓
1905	John Albert Johnson (D)	Ray W. Jones (R)	Peter E. Hanson (R)	Edward T. Young (R)	Samuel G. Iverson (R)	Julius H. Block (R)	52R, 11D	109R, 10D	C. A. Pidgeon (R)	Moses E. Clapp (R)	Knute Nelson (R)	9R	Roosevelt/ Fairbanks (R) ✓
1906	John Albert Johnson (D)	Ray W. Jones (R)	Peter E. Hanson (R)	Edward T. Young (R)	Samuel G. Iverson (R)	Julius H. Block (R)	52R, 11D	109R, 10D	C. A. Pidgeon (R)	Moses E. Clapp (R)	Knute Nelson (R)	9R	Roosevelt/ Fairbanks (R) ✓
1907	John Albert Johnson (D)	Adolph Olson Eberhart (R)	Julius A. Schmahl (R)	Edward T. Young (R)	Samuel G. Iverson (R)	Clarence C. Dinehart (R)	43R, 19D, 1Pop	102R, 14D, 3Proh	C. A. Pidgeon (R)	Moses E. Clapp (R)	Knute Nelson (R)	8R, 1D	Roosevelt/ Fairbanks (R) ✓
1908	John Albert Johnson (D)	Adolph Olson Eberhart (R)	Julius A. Schmahl (R)	Edward T. Young (R)	Samuel G. Iverson (R)	Clarence C. Dinehart (R)	43R, 19D, 1Pop	102R, 14D, 3Proh	C. A. Pidgeon (R)	Moses E. Clapp (R)	Knute Nelson (R)	8R, 1D	Taft/ Sherman (R) ✓
1909	Adolph Olson Eberhart (R)	Edward Everett Smith	Julius A. Schmahl (R)	George T. Simpson (R)	Samuel G. Iverson (R)	Clarence C. Dinehart (R)	43R, 19D, 1Pop	94R, 22D, 3Proh	C. A. Pidgeon (R)	Moses E. Clapp (R)	Knute Nelson (R)	8R, 1D	Taft/ Sherman (R) ✓
1910	Adolph Olson Eberhart (R)	Edward Everett Smith	Julius A. Schmahl (R)	George T. Simpson (R)	Samuel G. Iverson (R)	Elias S. Pettijohn (R)	43R, 19D, 1Pop	94R, 22D, 3Proh	Irving A. Caswell (R) (Note: Lost renomination.)	Moses E. Clapp (R)	Knute Nelson (R)	8R, 1D	Taft/ Sherman (R) ✓
1911	Adolph Olson Eberhart (R)	Samuel Y. Gordon (R)	Julius A. Schmahl (R)	George T. Simpson (R)	Samuel G. Iverson (R)	Walter J. Smith (R)	42R, 19D, 2I	88R, 26D, 4Proh, 1IR, 1Soc	Irving A. Caswell (R)	Moses E. Clapp (R)	Knute Nelson (R)	8R, 1D	Taft/ Sherman (R) ✓
1912	Adolph Olson Eberhart (R)	Samuel Y. Gordon (R)	Julius A. Schmahl (R)	Lyndon A. Smith (R)	Samuel G. Iverson (R)	Walter J. Smith (R)	42R, 19D, 2I	88R, 26D, 4Proh, 1IR, 1Soc	Irving A. Caswell (R)	Moses E. Clapp (R)	Knute Nelson (R)	8R, 1D	Roosevelt/ Johnson (Prog) ✗
1913	Adolph Olson Eberhart (R)	Joseph A. A. Burnquist (R)	Julius A. Schmahl (R)	Lyndon A. Smith (R)	Samuel G. Iverson (R)	Walter J. Smith (R)	42R, 19D, 2I	98R, 20D, 1 Proh, 1Soc	Irving A. Caswell (R)	Moses E. Clapp (R)	Knute Nelson (R)	8R, 1D	Roosevelt/ Johnson (Prog) ✗
1914	Adolph Olson Eberhart (R)	Joseph A. A. Burnquist (R)	Julius A. Schmahl (R)	Lyndon A. Smith (R)	Samuel G. Iverson (R)	Walter J. Smith (R)	42R, 19D, 2I	98R, 20D, 1 Proh, 1Soc	Irving A. Caswell (R)	Moses E. Clapp (R)	Knute Nelson (R)	8R, 1D	Roosevelt/ Johnson (Prog) ✗
1915	Winfield Scott Hammond (D)	Joseph A. A. Burnquist (R)	Julius A. Schmahl (R)	Lyndon A. Smith (R)	J. A. O. Preus (R)	Walter J. Smith (R)	Conservative majority (Note: After a constitutional amendment in 1912, the Minnesota Legislature was nonpartisan until 1973. It went into effect in 1915 Legislators caucused as "conservatives" and "liberals," roughly equivalent to Republicans and Democrats/Farmer Laborites.)	Conservative majority	Irving A. Caswell (R)	Moses E. Clapp (R)	Knute Nelson (R)	9R, 1D	Roosevelt/ Johnson (Prog) ✗
1916	Joseph A. A. Burnquist (R)	George H. Sullivan	Julius A. Schmahl (R)	Lyndon A. Smith (R)	J. A. O. Preus (R)	Arthur C. Gooding (R)	Conservative majority	Conservative majority	Irving A. Caswell (R)	Moses E. Clapp (R)	Knute Nelson (R)	9R, 1D	Hughes/ Fairbanks (R) ✗
1917	Joseph A. A. Burnquist (R)	Thomas Frankson (R)	Julius A. Schmahl (R)	Lyndon A. Smith (R)	J. A. O. Preus (R)	Henry Rines (R)	Conservative majority	Conservative majority	Irving A. Caswell (R)	Frank B. Kellogg (R)	Knute Nelson (R)	9R, 1D	Hughes/ Fairbanks (R) ✗
1918	Joseph A. A. Burnquist (R)	Thomas Frankson (R)	Julius A. Schmahl (R)	Clifford L. Hilton (R)	J. A. O. Preus (R)	Henry Rines (R)	Conservative majority	Conservative majority	Irving A. Caswell (R)	Frank B. Kellogg (R)	Knute Nelson (R)	9R, 1D	Hughes/ Fairbanks (R) ✗
1919	Joseph A. A. Burnquist (R)	Thomas Frankson (R)	Julius A. Schmahl (R)	Clifford L. Hilton (R)	J. A. O. Preus (R)	Henry Rines (R)	Conservative majority	Conservative majority	Herman J. Mueller (R) (Note: Lost renomination.)	Frank B. Kellogg (R)	Knute Nelson (R)	9R, 1FL	Hughes/ Fairbanks (R) ✗
1920	Joseph A. A. Burnquist (R)	Thomas Frankson (R)	Julius A. Schmahl (R)	Clifford L. Hilton (R)	J. A. O. Preus (R)	Henry Rines (R)	Conservative majority	Conservative majority	Herman J. Mueller (R)	Frank B. Kellogg (R)	Knute Nelson (R)	9R, 1FL	Harding/ Coolidge (R) ✓
1921	J. A. O. Preus (R)	Louis L. Collins (R)	Mike Holm (R)	Clifford L. Hilton (R)	Ray P. Chase (R)	Henry Rines (R)	Conservative majority	Conservative majority	Herman J. Mueller (R)	Frank B. Kellogg (R)	Knute Nelson (R)	10R	Harding/ Coolidge (R) ✓
1922	J. A. O. Preus (R)	Louis L. Collins (R)	Mike Holm (R)	Clifford L. Hilton (R)	Ray P. Chase (R)	Henry Rines (R)	Conservative majority	Conservative majority	Herman J. Mueller (R)	Frank B. Kellogg (R)	Knute Nelson (R)	10R	Harding/ Coolidge (R) ✓
1923	J. A. O. Preus (R)	Louis L. Collins (R)	Mike Holm (R)	Clifford L. Hilton (R)	Ray P. Chase (R)	Henry Rines (R)	Conservative majority	Conservative majority	Grace F. Kaercher (R)	Henrik Shipstead (FL)	Magnus Johnson (FL)	8R, 2FL	Harding/ Coolidge (R) ✓
1924	J. A. O. Preus (R)	Louis L. Collins (R)	Mike Holm (R)	Clifford L. Hilton (R)	Ray P. Chase (R)	Henry Rines (R)	Conservative majority	Conservative majority	Grace F. Kaercher (R)	Henrik Shipstead (FL)	Magnus Johnson (FL)	8R, 2FL	Coolidge/ Dawes (R) ✓
1925	Theodore Christianson (R)	William I. Nolan (R)	Mike Holm (R)	Clifford L. Hilton (R)	Ray P. Chase (R)	Edward W. Stark (R)	Conservative majority	Conservative majority	Grace F. Kaercher (R)	Henrik Shipstead (FL)	Thomas D. Schall (R)	7R, 3FL	Coolidge/ Dawes (R) ✓
1926	Theodore Christianson (R)	William I. Nolan (R)	Mike Holm (R)	Clifford L. Hilton (R)	Ray P. Chase (R)	Edward W. Stark (R)	Conservative majority	Conservative majority	Grace F. Kaercher (R)	Henrik Shipstead (FL)	Thomas D. Schall (R)	7R, 3FL	Coolidge/ Dawes (R) ✓
1927	Theodore Christianson (R)	William I. Nolan (R)	Mike Holm (R)	Albert F. Pratt (R)	Ray P. Chase (R)	Julius A. Schmahl (R)	Conservative majority	Conservative majority	Grace F. Kaercher (R)	Henrik Shipstead (FL)	Thomas D. Schall (R)	8R, 2FL	Coolidge/ Dawes (R) ✓
1928	Theodore Christianson (R)	William I. Nolan (R)	Mike Holm (R)	G. Aaron Youngquist (R)	Ray P. Chase (R)	Julius A. Schmahl (R)	Conservative majority	Conservative majority	Grace F. Kaercher (R)	Henrik Shipstead (FL)	Thomas D. Schall (R)	8R, 2FL	Hoover/ Curtis (R) ✓
1929	Theodore Christianson (R)	Charles Edward Adams (R)	Mike Holm (R)	Henry N. Benson (R)	Ray P. Chase (R)	Julius A. Schmahl (R)	Conservative majority	Conservative majority	Grace F. Kaercher (R)	Henrik Shipstead (FL)	Thomas D. Schall (R)	9R, 1FL	Hoover/ Curtis (R) ✓
1930	Theodore Christianson (R)	Charles Edward Adams (R)	Mike Holm (R)	Henry N. Benson (R)	Ray P. Chase (R)	Julius A. Schmahl (R)	Conservative majority	Conservative majority	Grace F. Kaercher (R)	Henrik Shipstead (FL)	Thomas D. Schall (R)	9R, 1FL	Hoover/ Curtis (R) ✓
1931	Floyd B. Olson (FL)	Henry M. Arens (FL)	Mike Holm (R)	Henry N. Benson (R)	Stafford King (R)	Julius A. Schmahl (R)	Conservative majority	Conservative majority	Grace F. Kaercher (R)	Henrik Shipstead (FL)	Thomas D. Schall (R)	9R, 1FL	Hoover/ Curtis (R) ✓
1932	Floyd B. Olson (FL)	Henry M. Arens (FL)	Mike Holm (R)	Henry N. Benson (R)	Stafford King (R)	Julius A. Schmahl (R)	Conservative majority	Conservative majority	Grace F. Kaercher (R)	Henrik Shipstead (FL)	Thomas D. Schall (R)	9R, 1FL	Roosevelt/ Garner (D) ✓
1933	Floyd B. Olson (FL)	Konrad K. Solberg (FL)	Mike Holm (R)	Harry H. Peterson (FL)	Stafford King (R)	Julius A. Schmahl (R)	Conservative majority	Liberal majority	Grace F. Kaercher (R)	Henrik Shipstead (FL)	Thomas D. Schall (R)	5FL, 3R, 1D	Roosevelt/ Garner (D) ✓
1934	Floyd B. Olson (FL)	Konrad K. Solberg (FL)	Mike Holm (R)	Harry H. Peterson (FL)	Stafford King (R)	Julius A. Schmahl (R)	Conservative majority	Liberal majority	Grace F. Kaercher (R)	Henrik Shipstead (FL)	Thomas D. Schall (R)	5FL, 3R, 1D	Roosevelt/ Garner (D) ✓
1935	Floyd B. Olson (FL)	Hjalmar Petersen (FL)	Mike Holm (R)	Harry H. Peterson (FL)	Stafford King (R)	Julius A. Schmahl (R)	Conservative majority	Conservative majority	Russell O. Gunderson (FL) (Note: Lost renomination.)	Henrik Shipstead (FL)	Elmer A. Benson (FL)	5R, 3FL, 1D	Roosevelt/ Garner (D) ✓
1936	Hjalmar Petersen (FL)	William B. Richardson (R) (Note: Served as acting lieutenant governor; never took the oath of office.)	Mike Holm (R)	William S. Ervin (FL)	Stafford King (R)	Julius A. Schmahl (R)	Conservative majority	Conservative majority	Russell O. Gunderson (FL)	Henrik Shipstead (FL)	Guy V. Howard (R)	5R, 3FL, 1D	Roosevelt/ Garner (D) ✓
1937	Elmer A. Benson (FL)	Gottfrid Lindsten (FL)	Mike Holm (R)	William S. Ervin (FL)	Stafford King (R)	C. A. Halverson (FL)	Conservative majority	Liberal majority	Russell O. Gunderson (FL)	Henrik Shipstead (FL)	Ernest Lundeen (FL)	5FL, 3R, 1D	Roosevelt/ Garner (D) ✓
1938	Elmer A. Benson (FL)	Gottfrid Lindsten (FL)	Mike Holm (R)	William S. Ervin (FL)	Stafford King (R)	C. A. Halverson (FL)	Conservative majority	Liberal majority	Russell O. Gunderson (FL)	Henrik Shipstead (FL)	Ernest Lundeen (FL)	5FL, 3R, 1D	Roosevelt/ Garner (D) ✓
1939	Harold Stassen (R)	C. Elmer Anderson (R)	Mike Holm (R)	Joseph A. A. Burnquist (R)	Stafford King (R)	Julius A. Schmahl (R)	Conservative majority	Conservative majority	Grace F. Kaercher (R)	Henrik Shipstead (FL)	Ernest Lundeen (FL)	7R, 1D, 1FL	Roosevelt/ Garner (D) ✓
1940	Harold Stassen (R)	C. Elmer Anderson (R)	Mike Holm (R)	Joseph A. A. Burnquist (R)	Stafford King (R)	Julius A. Schmahl (R)	Conservative majority	Conservative majority	Grace F. Kaercher (R)	Henrik Shipstead (FL)	Ernest Lundeen (FL)	7R, 1D, 1FL	Roosevelt/ Wallace (D) ✓
1941	Harold Stassen (R)	C. Elmer Anderson (R)	Mike Holm (R)	Joseph A. A. Burnquist (R)	Stafford King (R)	Julius A. Schmahl (R)	Conservative majority	Conservative majority	Grace F. Kaercher (R)	Henrik Shipstead (R)	Joseph H. Ball (R)	8R, 1FL	Roosevelt/ Wallace (D) ✓
1942	Harold Stassen (R)	C. Elmer Anderson (R)	Mike Holm (R)	Joseph A. A. Burnquist (R)	Stafford King (R)	Julius A. Schmahl (R)	Conservative majority	Conservative majority	Grace F. Kaercher (R)	Henrik Shipstead (R)	Arthur E. Nelson (R)	8R, 1FL	Roosevelt/ Wallace (D) ✓
1943	Harold Stassen (R)	Edward J. Thye (R)	Mike Holm (R)	Joseph A. A. Burnquist (R)	Stafford King (R)	Julius A. Schmahl (R)	Conservative majority	Conservative majority	Grace F. Kaercher (R)	Henrik Shipstead (R)	Arthur E. Nelson (R)	8R, 1FL	Roosevelt/ Wallace (D) ✓
1943	Edward J. Thye (R)	Archie H. Miller (R)	Mike Holm (R)	Joseph A. A. Burnquist (R)	Stafford King (R)	Julius A. Schmahl (R)	Conservative majority	Conservative majority	Grace F. Kaercher (R)	Henrik Shipstead (R)	Joseph H. Ball (R)	8R, 1FL	Roosevelt/ Wallace (D) ✓
1944	Edward J. Thye (R)	Archie H. Miller (R)	Mike Holm (R)	Joseph A. A. Burnquist (R)	Stafford King (R)	Julius A. Schmahl (R)	Conservative majority	Conservative majority	Grace F. Kaercher (R)	Henrik Shipstead (R)	Joseph H. Ball (R)	8R, 1FL	Roosevelt/ Truman (D) ✓
1945	Edward J. Thye (R)	C. Elmer Anderson (R)	Mike Holm (R)	Joseph A. A. Burnquist (R)	Stafford King (R)	Julius A. Schmahl (R)	Conservative majority	Conservative majority	Grace F. Kaercher (R)	Henrik Shipstead (R)	Joseph H. Ball (R)	7R, 2DFL (Note: The Minnesota Farmer–Labor Party merged into the Minnesota Democratic Party in 1944.)	Roosevelt/ Truman (D) ✓
1946	Edward J. Thye (R)	C. Elmer Anderson (R)	Mike Holm (R)	Joseph A. A. Burnquist (R)	Stafford King (R)	Julius A. Schmahl (R)	Conservative majority	Conservative majority	Grace F. Kaercher (R)	Henrik Shipstead (R)	Joseph H. Ball (R)	7R, 2DFL	Roosevelt/ Truman (D) ✓
1947	Luther Youngdahl (R)	C. Elmer Anderson (R)	Mike Holm (R)	Joseph A. A. Burnquist (R)	Stafford King (R)	Julius A. Schmahl (R)	Conservative majority	Conservative majority	Grace F. Kaercher (R)	Edward J. Thye (R)	Joseph H. Ball (R)	8R, 1DFL	Roosevelt/ Truman (D) ✓
1948	Luther Youngdahl (R)	C. Elmer Anderson (R)	Mike Holm (R)	Joseph A. A. Burnquist (R)	Stafford King (R)	Julius A. Schmahl (R)	Conservative majority	Conservative majority	Grace F. Kaercher (R)	Edward J. Thye (R)	Joseph H. Ball (R)	8R, 1DFL	Truman/ Barkley (D) ✓
1949	Luther Youngdahl (R)	C. Elmer Anderson (R)	Mike Holm (R)	Joseph A. A. Burnquist (R)	Stafford King (R)	Julius A. Schmahl (R)	Conservative majority	Conservative majority	Grace F. Kaercher (R)	Edward J. Thye (R)	Hubert Humphrey (DFL) (Note: Resigned to become Vice President of the United States.)	5R, 4DFL	Truman/ Barkley (D) ✓
1950	Luther Youngdahl (R)	C. Elmer Anderson (R)	Mike Holm (R)	Joseph A. A. Burnquist (R)	Stafford King (R)	Julius A. Schmahl (R)	Conservative majority	Conservative majority	Grace F. Kaercher (R)	Edward J. Thye (R)	Hubert Humphrey (DFL)	5R, 4DFL	Truman/ Barkley (D) ✓
1951	C. Elmer Anderson (R)	vacant	Mike Holm (R)	Joseph A. A. Burnquist (R)	Stafford King (R)	Val Bjornson (R)	51C, 16L	87C, 44L	Grace F. Kaercher (R)	Edward J. Thye (R)	Hubert Humphrey (DFL)	5R, 4DFL	Truman/ Barkley (D) ✓
1952	C. Elmer Anderson (R)	vacant	H. H. Chesterman	Joseph A. A. Burnquist (R)	Stafford King (R)	Val Bjornson (R)	51C, 16L	87C, 44L	Grace F. Kaercher (R)	Edward J. Thye (R)	Hubert Humphrey (DFL)	5R, 4DFL	Eisenhower/ Nixon (R) ✓
1952	C. Elmer Anderson (R)	vacant	Virginia Paul Holm (R)	Joseph A. A. Burnquist (R)	Stafford King (R)	Val Bjornson (R)	51C, 16L	87C, 44L	Grace F. Kaercher (R)	Edward J. Thye (R)	Hubert Humphrey (DFL)	5R, 4DFL	Eisenhower/ Nixon (R) ✓
1953	C. Elmer Anderson (R)	Ancher Nelsen (R) (Note: Resigned to become administrator of the Rural Electrification Administration.)	Virginia Paul Holm (R)	Joseph A. A. Burnquist (R)	Stafford King (R)	Val Bjornson (R)	52C, 15L	85C, 46L	Grace F. Kaercher (R)	Edward J. Thye (R)	Hubert Humphrey (DFL)	5R, 4DFL	Eisenhower/ Nixon (R) ✓
1954	C. Elmer Anderson (R)	Donald O. Wright (R)	Virginia Paul Holm (R)	Joseph A. A. Burnquist (R)	Stafford King (R)	Val Bjornson (R)	52C, 15L	85C, 46L	Grace F. Kaercher (R)	Edward J. Thye (R)	Hubert Humphrey (DFL)	5R, 4DFL	Eisenhower/ Nixon (R) ✓
1955	Orville Freeman (DFL)	Karl Rolvaag (DFL)	Joseph L. Donovan (DFL)	Miles Lord (DFL)	Stafford King (R)	Arthur Hansen (DFL)	48C, 19L	66L, 65C	Frank Larkin (DFL)	Edward J. Thye (R)	Hubert Humphrey (DFL)	5DFL, 4R	Eisenhower/ Nixon (R) ✓
1956	Orville Freeman (DFL)	Karl Rolvaag (DFL)	Joseph L. Donovan (DFL)	Miles Lord (DFL)	Stafford King (R)	Arthur Hansen (DFL)	48C, 19L	66L, 65C	Frank Larkin (DFL)	Edward J. Thye (R)	Hubert Humphrey (DFL)	5DFL, 4R	Eisenhower/ Nixon (R) ✓
1957	Orville Freeman (DFL)	Karl Rolvaag (DFL)	Joseph L. Donovan (DFL)	Miles Lord (DFL)	Stafford King (R)	Val Bjornson (R)	48C, 19L	70L, 61C	(Note: Constitutional amendment passed in 1956 making the clerk an appointed, nonpartisan position.)	Edward J. Thye (R)	Hubert Humphrey (DFL)	5DFL, 4R	Eisenhower/ Nixon (R) ✓
1958	Orville Freeman (DFL)	Karl Rolvaag (DFL)	Joseph L. Donovan (DFL)	Miles Lord (DFL)	Stafford King (R)	Val Bjornson (R)	48C, 19L	70L, 61C	(Note: Constitutional amendment passed in 1956 making the clerk an appointed, nonpartisan position.)	Edward J. Thye (R)	Hubert Humphrey (DFL)	5DFL, 4R	Eisenhower/ Nixon (R) ✓
1959	Orville Freeman (DFL)	Karl Rolvaag (DFL)	Joseph L. Donovan (DFL)	Miles Lord (DFL)	Stafford King (R)	Val Bjornson (R)	43C, 24L	72L, 59C	(Note: Constitutional amendment passed in 1956 making the clerk an appointed, nonpartisan position.)	Eugene McCarthy (DFL)	Hubert Humphrey (DFL)	5R, 4DFL	Eisenhower/ Nixon (R) ✓
1960	Orville Freeman (DFL)	Karl Rolvaag (DFL)	Joseph L. Donovan (DFL)	Walter Mondale (DFL)	Stafford King (R)	Val Bjornson (R)	43C, 24L	72L, 59C	(Note: Constitutional amendment passed in 1956 making the clerk an appointed, nonpartisan position.)	Eugene McCarthy (DFL)	Hubert Humphrey (DFL)	5R, 4DFL	Kennedy/ Johnson (D) ✓
1961	Elmer L. Andersen (R) (Note: A recount and subsequent litigation lasting 139 days delayed Karl Rolvaag's inauguration as governor.)	Karl Rolvaag (DFL)	Joseph L. Donovan (DFL)	Walter Mondale (DFL)	Stafford King (R)	Val Bjornson (R)	43C, 24L	72L, 59C	(Note: Constitutional amendment passed in 1956 making the clerk an appointed, nonpartisan position.)	Eugene McCarthy (DFL)	Hubert Humphrey (DFL)	6R, 3DFL	Kennedy/ Johnson (D) ✓
1962	Elmer L. Andersen (R)	Karl Rolvaag (DFL)	Joseph L. Donovan (DFL)	Walter Mondale (DFL)	Stafford King (R)	Val Bjornson (R)	43C, 24L	72L, 59C	(Note: Constitutional amendment passed in 1956 making the clerk an appointed, nonpartisan position.)	Eugene McCarthy (DFL)	Hubert Humphrey (DFL)	6R, 3DFL	Kennedy/ Johnson (D) ✓
1963	Karl Rolvaag (DFL)	Sandy Keith (DFL)	Joseph L. Donovan (DFL)	Walter Mondale (DFL)	Stafford King (R)	Val Bjornson (R)	43C, 24L	80C, 54L, 1I	(Note: Constitutional amendment passed in 1956 making the clerk an appointed, nonpartisan position.)	Eugene McCarthy (DFL)	Hubert Humphrey (DFL)	4R, 4DFL	Kennedy/ Johnson (D) ✓
1964	Karl Rolvaag (DFL)	Sandy Keith (DFL)	Joseph L. Donovan (DFL)	Walter Mondale (DFL)	Stafford King (R)	Val Bjornson (R)	43C, 24L	80C, 54L, 1I	(Note: Constitutional amendment passed in 1956 making the clerk an appointed, nonpartisan position.)	Eugene McCarthy (DFL)	Hubert Humphrey (DFL)	4R, 4DFL	Johnson/ Humphrey (D) ✓
1964	Karl Rolvaag (DFL)	Sandy Keith (DFL)	Joseph L. Donovan (DFL)	Robert W. Mattson Sr. (DFL)	Stafford King (R)	Val Bjornson (R)	43C, 24L	80C, 54L, 1I	(Note: Constitutional amendment passed in 1956 making the clerk an appointed, nonpartisan position.)	Eugene McCarthy (DFL)	Walter Mondale (DFL)	4R, 4DFL	Johnson/ Humphrey (D) ✓
1965	Karl Rolvaag (DFL)	Sandy Keith (DFL)	Joseph L. Donovan (DFL)	Robert W. Mattson Sr. (DFL)	Stafford King (R)	Val Bjornson (R)	44C, 23L	78C, 56L, 1I	(Note: Constitutional amendment passed in 1956 making the clerk an appointed, nonpartisan position.)	Eugene McCarthy (DFL)	Walter Mondale (DFL)	4R, 4DFL	Johnson/ Humphrey (D) ✓
1966	Karl Rolvaag (DFL)	Sandy Keith (DFL)	Joseph L. Donovan (DFL)	Robert W. Mattson Sr. (DFL)	Stafford King (R)	Val Bjornson (R)	44C, 23L	78C, 56L, 1I	(Note: Constitutional amendment passed in 1956 making the clerk an appointed, nonpartisan position.)	Eugene McCarthy (DFL)	Walter Mondale (DFL)	4R, 4DFL	Johnson/ Humphrey (D) ✓
1967	Harold LeVander (R)	James B. Goetz (R)	Joseph L. Donovan (DFL)	Douglas M. Head (R)	Stafford King (R)	Val Bjornson (R)	45C, 22L	93C, 42L	(Note: Constitutional amendment passed in 1956 making the clerk an appointed, nonpartisan position.)	Eugene McCarthy (DFL)	Walter Mondale (DFL)	5R, 3DFL	Johnson/ Humphrey (D) ✓
1968	Harold LeVander (R)	James B. Goetz (R)	Joseph L. Donovan (DFL)	Douglas M. Head (R)	Stafford King (R)	Val Bjornson (R)	45C, 22L	93C, 42L	(Note: Constitutional amendment passed in 1956 making the clerk an appointed, nonpartisan position.)	Eugene McCarthy (DFL)	Walter Mondale (DFL)	5R, 3DFL	Humphrey/ Muskie (D) ✗
1969	Harold LeVander (R)	James B. Goetz (R)	Joseph L. Donovan (DFL)	Douglas M. Head (R)	William J. O'Brien (R)	Val Bjornson (R)	45C, 22L	85C, 50L	(Note: Constitutional amendment passed in 1956 making the clerk an appointed, nonpartisan position.)	Eugene McCarthy (DFL)	Walter Mondale (DFL)	5R, 3DFL	Humphrey/ Muskie (D) ✗
1970	Harold LeVander (R)	James B. Goetz (R)	Joseph L. Donovan (DFL)	Douglas M. Head (R)	William J. O'Brien (R)	Val Bjornson (R)	45C, 22L	85C, 50L	(Note: Constitutional amendment passed in 1956 making the clerk an appointed, nonpartisan position.)	Eugene McCarthy (DFL)	Walter Mondale (DFL)	5R, 3DFL	Humphrey/ Muskie (D) ✗
1971	Wendell Anderson (DFL)	Rudy Perpich (DFL)	Arlen Erdahl (R)	Warren Spannaus (DFL)	Rolland Hatfield (R)	Val Bjornson (R)	34C, 33L	70C, 65L	(Note: Constitutional amendment passed in 1956 making the clerk an appointed, nonpartisan position.)	Hubert Humphrey (DFL)	Walter Mondale (DFL)	4R, 4DFL	Humphrey/ Muskie (D) ✗
1972	Wendell Anderson (DFL)	Rudy Perpich (DFL)	Arlen Erdahl (R)	Warren Spannaus (DFL)	Rolland Hatfield (R)	Val Bjornson (R)	34C, 33L	70C, 65L	(Note: Constitutional amendment passed in 1956 making the clerk an appointed, nonpartisan position.)	Hubert Humphrey (DFL)	Walter Mondale (DFL)	4R, 4DFL	Nixon/ Agnew (R) ✓
1973	Wendell Anderson (DFL)	Rudy Perpich (DFL)	Arlen Erdahl (R)	Warren Spannaus (DFL)	Rolland Hatfield (R)	Val Bjornson (R)	37DFL, 30R	77DFL, 57R	(Note: Constitutional amendment passed in 1956 making the clerk an appointed, nonpartisan position.)	Hubert Humphrey (DFL)	Walter Mondale (DFL)	4R, 4DFL	Nixon/ Agnew (R) ✓
1974	Wendell Anderson (DFL)	Rudy Perpich (DFL)	Arlen Erdahl (R)	Warren Spannaus (DFL)	Rolland Hatfield (R)	Val Bjornson (R)	36DFL, 31R	77DFL, 57R	(Note: Constitutional amendment passed in 1956 making the clerk an appointed, nonpartisan position.)	Hubert Humphrey (DFL)	Walter Mondale (DFL)	4R, 4DFL	Nixon/ Agnew (R) ✓
1975	Wendell Anderson (DFL)	Rudy Perpich (DFL)	Joan Growe (DFL)	Warren Spannaus (DFL)	Bob Mattson (DFL)	Jim Lord (DFL)	38DFL, 28IR, (Note: From 1975 until 1995, the Republican Party of Minnesota was called the Independent–Republican Party of Minnesota.) 1I	104DFL, 30IR	(Note: Constitutional amendment passed in 1956 making the clerk an appointed, nonpartisan position.)	Hubert Humphrey (DFL)	Walter Mondale (DFL)	5DFL, 3R	Nixon/ Agnew (R) ✓
1976	Wendell Anderson (DFL)	Rudy Perpich (DFL)	Joan Growe (DFL)	Warren Spannaus (DFL)	Bob Mattson (DFL)	Jim Lord (DFL)	38DFL, 28IR, 1I	103DFL, 31IR	(Note: Constitutional amendment passed in 1956 making the clerk an appointed, nonpartisan position.)	Hubert Humphrey (DFL)	Walter Mondale (DFL)	5DFL, 3R	Carter/ Mondale (D) ✓
1976	Rudy Perpich (DFL)	Alec G. Olson (DFL)	Joan Growe (DFL)	Warren Spannaus (DFL)	Bob Mattson (DFL)	Jim Lord (DFL)	38DFL, 28IR, 1I	103DFL, 31IR	(Note: Constitutional amendment passed in 1956 making the clerk an appointed, nonpartisan position.)	Hubert Humphrey (DFL)	Wendell Anderson (DFL)	5DFL, 3R	Carter/ Mondale (D) ✓
1977	Rudy Perpich (DFL)	Alec G. Olson (DFL)	Joan Growe (DFL)	Warren Spannaus (DFL)	Bob Mattson (DFL)	Jim Lord (DFL)	49DFL, 18IR	104DFL, 30IR	(Note: Constitutional amendment passed in 1956 making the clerk an appointed, nonpartisan position.)	Hubert Humphrey (DFL)	Wendell Anderson (DFL)	4DFL, 4R	Carter/ Mondale (D) ✓
1978	Rudy Perpich (DFL)	Alec G. Olson (DFL)	Joan Growe (DFL)	Warren Spannaus (DFL)	Bob Mattson (DFL)	Jim Lord (DFL)	48DFL, 19IR	99DFL, 35IR (Note: A series of special elections and party switches led to the composition in the 1978 session.)	(Note: Constitutional amendment passed in 1956 making the clerk an appointed, nonpartisan position.)	Muriel Humphrey (DFL)	Wendell Anderson (DFL)	4DFL, 4R	Carter/ Mondale (D) ✓
1979	Al Quie (IR)	Lou Wangberg (IR)	Joan Growe (DFL)	Warren Spannaus (DFL)	Arne Carlson (IR)	Jim Lord (DFL)	47DFL, 20IR	67DFL, 67IR (Note: With the split chamber, a power-sharing agreement was negotiated. A Republican Speaker, Rod Searle, was elected, but Democrats received control of most committees. The tie was broken when a Republican, Robert Pavlak, was expelled from the chamber on May 19, 1979 on a party-line vote due to a legal and ethical violations. The agreement of shared-power held through the end of the year's session two days later, despite the Democrats' 67-66 majority.)	(Note: Constitutional amendment passed in 1956 making the clerk an appointed, nonpartisan position.)	David Durenberger (IR)	Rudy Boschwitz (IR) (Note: Appointed by governor to fill vacancy, having already been elected to next full term.)	4DFL, 4R	Carter/ Mondale (D) ✓
1980	Al Quie (IR)	Lou Wangberg (IR)	Joan Growe (DFL)	Warren Spannaus (DFL)	Arne Carlson (IR)	Jim Lord (DFL)	45DFL, 22IR	68DFL, 66IR (Note: A special election was held for Pavlak's seat in District 67A. A Democrat, Frank J. Rodriguez, Jr., was elected, giving the Democrats a constitutional majority. With that, they reorganized the chamber under their control in the 1980 session.)	(Note: Constitutional amendment passed in 1956 making the clerk an appointed, nonpartisan position.)	David Durenberger (IR)	Rudy Boschwitz (IR)	4DFL, 4R	Carter/ Mondale (D) ✗
1981	Al Quie (IR)	Lou Wangberg (IR)	Joan Growe (DFL)	Warren Spannaus (DFL)	Arne Carlson (IR)	Jim Lord (DFL)	45DFL, 22IR	70DFL, 64IR	(Note: Constitutional amendment passed in 1956 making the clerk an appointed, nonpartisan position.)	David Durenberger (IR)	Rudy Boschwitz (IR)	5R, 3DFL	Carter/ Mondale (D) ✗
1982	Al Quie (IR)	Lou Wangberg (IR)	Joan Growe (DFL)	Warren Spannaus (DFL)	Arne Carlson (IR)	Jim Lord (DFL)	44DFL, 23IR	70DFL, 64IR	(Note: Constitutional amendment passed in 1956 making the clerk an appointed, nonpartisan position.)	David Durenberger (IR)	Rudy Boschwitz (IR)	5R, 3DFL	Carter/ Mondale (D) ✗
1983	Rudy Perpich (DFL)	Marlene Johnson (DFL)	Joan Growe (DFL)	Skip Humphrey (DFL)	Arne Carlson (IR)	Robert W. Mattson Jr. (DFL)	42DFL, 25IR	77DFL, 57IR	(Note: Constitutional amendment passed in 1956 making the clerk an appointed, nonpartisan position.)	David Durenberger (IR)	Rudy Boschwitz (IR)	5DFL, 3R	Carter/ Mondale (D) ✗
1984	Rudy Perpich (DFL)	Marlene Johnson (DFL)	Joan Growe (DFL)	Skip Humphrey (DFL)	Arne Carlson (IR)	Robert W. Mattson Jr. (DFL)	42DFL, 25IR	76DFL, 58IR	(Note: Constitutional amendment passed in 1956 making the clerk an appointed, nonpartisan position.)	David Durenberger (IR)	Rudy Boschwitz (IR)	5DFL, 3R	Mondale/ Ferraro (D) ✗
1985	Rudy Perpich (DFL)	Marlene Johnson (DFL)	Joan Growe (DFL)	Skip Humphrey (DFL)	Arne Carlson (IR)	Robert W. Mattson Jr. (DFL)	42DFL, 24IR, 1I (Note: A party switch from Republican to Independent by Charles Berg led to the composition in the 1985 session.)	69IR, 65DFL	(Note: Constitutional amendment passed in 1956 making the clerk an appointed, nonpartisan position.)	David Durenberger (IR)	Rudy Boschwitz (IR)	5DFL, 3R	Mondale/ Ferraro (D) ✗
1986	Rudy Perpich (DFL)	Marlene Johnson (DFL)	Joan Growe (DFL)	Skip Humphrey (DFL)	Arne Carlson (IR)	Robert W. Mattson Jr. (DFL)	43DFL, 24IR (Note: A party switch from Independent to DFL by Charles Berg led to the composition in the 1986 session.)	69IR, 65DFL	(Note: Constitutional amendment passed in 1956 making the clerk an appointed, nonpartisan position.)	David Durenberger (IR)	Rudy Boschwitz (IR)	5DFL, 3R	Mondale/ Ferraro (D) ✗
1987	Rudy Perpich (DFL)	Marlene Johnson (DFL)	Joan Growe (DFL)	Skip Humphrey (DFL)	Arne Carlson (IR)	Michael McGrath (DFL)	47DFL, 20IR	83DFL, 51IR	(Note: Constitutional amendment passed in 1956 making the clerk an appointed, nonpartisan position.)	David Durenberger (IR)	Rudy Boschwitz (IR)	5DFL, 3R	Mondale/ Ferraro (D) ✗
1988	Rudy Perpich (DFL)	Marlene Johnson (DFL)	Joan Growe (DFL)	Skip Humphrey (DFL)	Arne Carlson (IR)	Michael McGrath (DFL)	46DFL, 21IR	82DFL, 52IR	(Note: Constitutional amendment passed in 1956 making the clerk an appointed, nonpartisan position.)	David Durenberger (IR)	Rudy Boschwitz (IR)	5DFL, 3R	Dukakis/ Bentsen (D) ✗
1989	Rudy Perpich (DFL)	Marlene Johnson (DFL)	Joan Growe (DFL)	Skip Humphrey (DFL)	Arne Carlson (IR)	Michael McGrath (DFL)	44DFL, 23IR	81DFL, 53IR	(Note: Constitutional amendment passed in 1956 making the clerk an appointed, nonpartisan position.)	David Durenberger (IR)	Rudy Boschwitz (IR)	5DFL, 3R	Dukakis/ Bentsen (D) ✗
1990	Rudy Perpich (DFL)	Marlene Johnson (DFL)	Joan Growe (DFL)	Skip Humphrey (DFL)	Arne Carlson (IR)	Michael McGrath (DFL)	44DFL, 23IR	80DFL, 54IR	(Note: Constitutional amendment passed in 1956 making the clerk an appointed, nonpartisan position.)	David Durenberger (IR)	Rudy Boschwitz (IR)	5DFL, 3R	Dukakis/ Bentsen (D) ✗
1991	Arne Carlson (IR)	Joanell Dyrstad (IR)	Joan Growe (DFL)	Skip Humphrey (DFL)	Mark Dayton (DFL)	Michael McGrath (DFL)	46DFL, 21IR	80DFL, 54IR	(Note: Constitutional amendment passed in 1956 making the clerk an appointed, nonpartisan position.)	David Durenberger (IR)	Paul Wellstone (DFL)	6DFL, 2R	Dukakis/ Bentsen (D) ✗
1992	Arne Carlson (IR)	Joanell Dyrstad (IR)	Joan Growe (DFL)	Skip Humphrey (DFL)	Mark Dayton (DFL)	Michael McGrath (DFL)	46DFL, 21IR	78DFL, 56IR	(Note: Constitutional amendment passed in 1956 making the clerk an appointed, nonpartisan position.)	David Durenberger (IR)	Paul Wellstone (DFL)	6DFL, 2R	Clinton/ Gore (D) ✓
1993	Arne Carlson (IR)	Joanell Dyrstad (IR)	Joan Growe (DFL)	Skip Humphrey (DFL)	Mark Dayton (DFL)	Michael McGrath (DFL)	45DFL, 22IR	87DFL, 47IR	(Note: Constitutional amendment passed in 1956 making the clerk an appointed, nonpartisan position.)	David Durenberger (IR)	Paul Wellstone (DFL)	6DFL, 2R	Clinton/ Gore (D) ✓
1994	Arne Carlson (IR)	Joanell Dyrstad (IR)	Joan Growe (DFL)	Skip Humphrey (DFL)	Mark Dayton (DFL)	Michael McGrath (DFL)	45DFL, 22IR	84DFL, 50IR	(Note: Constitutional amendment passed in 1956 making the clerk an appointed, nonpartisan position.)	David Durenberger (IR)	Paul Wellstone (DFL)	6DFL, 2R	Clinton/ Gore (D) ✓
1995	Arne Carlson (IR)	Joanne Benson (IR)	Joan Growe (DFL)	Skip Humphrey (DFL)	Judi Dutcher (IR)	Michael McGrath (DFL)	43DFL, 24IR	71DFL, 63IR	(Note: Constitutional amendment passed in 1956 making the clerk an appointed, nonpartisan position.)	Rod Grams (R)	Paul Wellstone (DFL)	6DFL, 2R	Clinton/ Gore (D) ✓
1996	Arne Carlson (IR)	Joanne Benson (IR)	Joan Growe (DFL)	Skip Humphrey (DFL)	Judi Dutcher (IR)	Michael McGrath (DFL)	42DFL, 25R	69DFL, 65R	(Note: Constitutional amendment passed in 1956 making the clerk an appointed, nonpartisan position.)	Rod Grams (R)	Paul Wellstone (DFL)	6DFL, 2R	Clinton/ Gore (D) ✓
1997	Arne Carlson (IR)	Joanne Benson (IR)	Joan Growe (DFL)	Skip Humphrey (DFL)	Judi Dutcher (IR)	Michael McGrath (DFL)	42DFL, 24R, 1I	70DFL, 64R	(Note: Constitutional amendment passed in 1956 making the clerk an appointed, nonpartisan position.)	Rod Grams (R)	Paul Wellstone (DFL)	6DFL, 2R	Clinton/ Gore (D) ✓
1998	Arne Carlson (IR)	Joanne Benson (IR)	Joan Growe (DFL)	Skip Humphrey (DFL)	Judi Dutcher (IR)	Michael McGrath (DFL)	42DFL, 24R, 1I	70DFL, 64R	(Note: Constitutional amendment passed in 1956 making the clerk an appointed, nonpartisan position.)	Rod Grams (R)	Paul Wellstone (DFL)	6DFL, 2R	Clinton/ Gore (D) ✓
1999	Jesse Ventura (Ref)	Mae Schunk (Ref)	Mary Kiffmeyer (R)	Mike Hatch (DFL)	Judi Dutcher (IR)	Carol C. Johnson (DFL)	40DFL, 26R, 1I	71R, 63DFL	(Note: Constitutional amendment passed in 1956 making the clerk an appointed, nonpartisan position.)	Rod Grams (R)	Paul Wellstone (DFL)	6DFL, 2R	Clinton/ Gore (D) ✓
2000	Jesse Ventura (IPM)	Mae Schunk (IPM)	Mary Kiffmeyer (R)	Mike Hatch (DFL)	Judi Dutcher (DFL) (Note: Dutcher switched parties in 2000.)	Carol C. Johnson (DFL)	41DFL, 25R, 1I (Note: A series of special elections and party switches led to the composition in the 2000 session.)	70R, 63DFL, 1I (Note: A party switch from Republican to Independent by Doug Reuter led to the composition in the 2000 session.)	(Note: Constitutional amendment passed in 1956 making the clerk an appointed, nonpartisan position.)	Rod Grams (R)	Paul Wellstone (DFL)	6DFL, 2R	Gore/ Lieberman (D) ✗
2001	Jesse Ventura (IPM)	Mae Schunk (IPM)	Mary Kiffmeyer (R)	Mike Hatch (DFL)	Judi Dutcher (DFL)	Carol C. Johnson (DFL)	39DFL, 27R, 1IPM	69R, 65DFL	(Note: Constitutional amendment passed in 1956 making the clerk an appointed, nonpartisan position.)	Mark Dayton (DFL)	Paul Wellstone (DFL)	5DFL, 3R	Gore/ Lieberman (D) ✗
2002	Jesse Ventura (IPM)	Mae Schunk (IPM)	Mary Kiffmeyer (R)	Mike Hatch (DFL)	Judi Dutcher (DFL)	Carol C. Johnson (DFL)	39DFL, 27R, 1IPM	70R, 64DFL	(Note: Constitutional amendment passed in 1956 making the clerk an appointed, nonpartisan position.)	Mark Dayton (DFL)	Paul Wellstone (DFL)	5DFL, 3R	Gore/ Lieberman (D) ✗
2002	Jesse Ventura (IPM)	Mae Schunk (IPM)	Mary Kiffmeyer (R)	Mike Hatch (DFL)	Judi Dutcher (DFL)	Carol C. Johnson (DFL)	39DFL, 27R, 1IPM	70R, 64DFL	(Note: Constitutional amendment passed in 1956 making the clerk an appointed, nonpartisan position.)	Mark Dayton (DFL)	Dean Barkley (IPM)	5DFL, 3R	Gore/ Lieberman (D) ✗

== 2003–present ==
Year	Executive offices					State Legislature		United States Congress			Electoral votes
Year	Governor	Lt. Governor	Secretary of State	Attorney General	Auditor	State Senate	State House	U.S. Senator (Class I)	U.S. Senator (Class II)	U.S. House	Electoral votes
2003	Tim Pawlenty (R)	Carol Molnau (R)	Mary Kiffmeyer (R)	Mike Hatch (DFL)	Patricia Anderson (R)	35DFL, 31R, 1IPM	81R, 53DFL	Mark Dayton (DFL)	Norm Coleman (R)	4DFL, 4R	
2004	Tim Pawlenty (R)	Carol Molnau (R)	Mary Kiffmeyer (R)	Mike Hatch (DFL)	Patricia Anderson (R)	35DFL, 31R, 1IPM	81R, 53DFL	Mark Dayton (DFL)	Norm Coleman (R)	4DFL, 4R	Kerry/ Edwards (D) ✗
2005	Tim Pawlenty (R)	Carol Molnau (R)	Mary Kiffmeyer (R)	Mike Hatch (DFL)	Patricia Anderson (R)	35DFL, 31R, 1IPM	68R, 66DFL	Mark Dayton (DFL)	Norm Coleman (R)	4DFL, 4R	Kerry/ Edwards (D) ✗
2006	Tim Pawlenty (R)	Carol Molnau (R)	Mary Kiffmeyer (R)	Mike Hatch (DFL)	Patricia Anderson (R)	37DFL, 29R, 1IPM	68R, 66DFL	Mark Dayton (DFL)	Norm Coleman (R)	4DFL, 4R	Kerry/ Edwards (D) ✗
2007	Tim Pawlenty (R)	Carol Molnau (R)	Mark Ritchie (DFL)	Lori Swanson (DFL)	Rebecca Otto (DFL)	44DFL, 23R	85DFL, 49R	Amy Klobuchar (DFL)	Norm Coleman (R)	5DFL, 3R	Kerry/ Edwards (D) ✗
2007	Tim Pawlenty (R)	Carol Molnau (R)	Mark Ritchie (DFL)	Lori Swanson (DFL)	Rebecca Otto (DFL)	44DFL, 22R (Note: In December 2007, Republican Tom Neuville resigned to accept a District Court appointment.)	85DFL, 49R	Amy Klobuchar (DFL)	Norm Coleman (R)	5DFL, 3R	Kerry/ Edwards (D) ✗
2008	Tim Pawlenty (R)	Carol Molnau (R)	Mark Ritchie (DFL)	Lori Swanson (DFL)	Rebecca Otto (DFL)	44DFL, 22R	85DFL, 49R	Amy Klobuchar (DFL)	Norm Coleman (R)	5DFL, 3R	Obama/ Biden (D) ✓
2008	Tim Pawlenty (R)	Carol Molnau (R)	Mark Ritchie (DFL)	Lori Swanson (DFL)	Rebecca Otto (DFL)	45DFL, 22R (Note: In January 2008, Democrat Kevin Dahle was elected in a special election to succeed Republican Tom Neuville.)	85DFL, 48R, 1IR (Note: In July 2008, Republican incumbent Ron Erhardt became an independent.)	Amy Klobuchar (DFL)	Norm Coleman (R)	5DFL, 3R	Obama/ Biden (D) ✓
2009	Tim Pawlenty (R)	Carol Molnau (R)	Mark Ritchie (DFL)	Lori Swanson (DFL)	Rebecca Otto (DFL)	46DFL, 21R	87DFL, 47R	Amy Klobuchar (DFL)	Al Franken (DFL)	5DFL, 3R	Obama/ Biden (D) ✓
2010	Tim Pawlenty (R)	Carol Molnau (R)	Mark Ritchie (DFL)	Lori Swanson (DFL)	Rebecca Otto (DFL)	46DFL, 21R	87DFL, 47R	Amy Klobuchar (DFL)	Al Franken (DFL)	5DFL, 3R	Obama/ Biden (D) ✓
2011	Mark Dayton (DFL)	Yvonne Prettner Solon (DFL)	Mark Ritchie (DFL)	Lori Swanson (DFL)	Rebecca Otto (DFL)	37R, 30DFL	72R, 62DFL	Amy Klobuchar (DFL)	Al Franken (DFL)	4DFL, 4R	Obama/ Biden (D) ✓
2012	Mark Dayton (DFL)	Yvonne Prettner Solon (DFL)	Mark Ritchie (DFL)	Lori Swanson (DFL)	Rebecca Otto (DFL)	37R, 30DFL	72R, 62DFL	Amy Klobuchar (DFL)	Al Franken (DFL)	4DFL, 4R	Obama/ Biden (D) ✓
2013	Mark Dayton (DFL)	Yvonne Prettner Solon (DFL)	Mark Ritchie (DFL)	Lori Swanson (DFL)	Rebecca Otto (DFL)	39DFL, 28R	73DFL, 61R	Amy Klobuchar (DFL)	Al Franken (DFL)	5DFL, 3R	Obama/ Biden (D) ✓
2014	Mark Dayton (DFL)	Yvonne Prettner Solon (DFL)	Mark Ritchie (DFL)	Lori Swanson (DFL)	Rebecca Otto (DFL)	39DFL, 28R	73DFL, 61R	Amy Klobuchar (DFL)	Al Franken (DFL)	5DFL, 3R	Obama/ Biden (D) ✓
2015	Mark Dayton (DFL)	Tina Smith (DFL)	Steve Simon (DFL)	Lori Swanson (DFL)	Rebecca Otto (DFL)	39DFL, 28R	72R, 62DFL	Amy Klobuchar (DFL)	Al Franken (DFL)	5DFL, 3R	Obama/ Biden (D) ✓
2016	Mark Dayton (DFL)	Tina Smith (DFL)	Steve Simon (DFL)	Lori Swanson (DFL)	Rebecca Otto (DFL)	39DFL, 28R	73R, 61DFL	Amy Klobuchar (DFL)	Al Franken (DFL)	5DFL, 3R	Clinton/ Kaine (D) ✗
2017	Mark Dayton (DFL)	Tina Smith (DFL)	Steve Simon (DFL)	Lori Swanson (DFL)	Rebecca Otto (DFL)	34R, 33DFL	77R, 57DFL	Amy Klobuchar (DFL)	Al Franken (DFL)	5DFL, 3R	Clinton/ Kaine (D) ✗
2018	Mark Dayton (DFL)	Michelle Fischbach (R)	Steve Simon (DFL)	Lori Swanson (DFL)	Rebecca Otto (DFL)	33R, 33DFL	77R, 57DFL	Amy Klobuchar (DFL)	Tina Smith (DFL)	5DFL, 3R	Clinton/ Kaine (D) ✗
2019	Tim Walz (DFL)	Peggy Flanagan (DFL)	Steve Simon (DFL)	Keith Ellison (DFL)	Julie Blaha (DFL)	35R, 32DFL (Note: A seat flipped from Democratic to Republican in February through a special election.)	75DFL, 59R (Note: Four Republicans announced on December 8, 2018, they would not join the Republican caucus in the 91st Legislature and would instead form their own caucus, the "New House Republican Caucus.")	Amy Klobuchar (DFL)	Tina Smith (DFL)	5DFL, 3R	Clinton/ Kaine (D) ✗
2020	Tim Walz (DFL)	Peggy Flanagan (DFL)	Steve Simon (DFL)	Keith Ellison (DFL)	Julie Blaha (DFL)	35R, 32DFL	75DFL, 59R	Amy Klobuchar (DFL)	Tina Smith (DFL)	5DFL, 3R	Biden/ Harris (D) ✓
2021	Tim Walz (DFL)	Peggy Flanagan (DFL)	Steve Simon (DFL)	Keith Ellison (DFL)	Julie Blaha (DFL)	34R, 31DFL, 2I (Note: Tom Bakk and David Tomassoni were re-elected as Democrats in the 2020 election, but switched to Independent immediately after.)	70DFL, 64R (Note: Five Republicans do not caucus with the Republican minority, see note [an])	Amy Klobuchar (DFL)	Tina Smith (DFL)	4DFL, 4R	Biden/ Harris (D) ✓
2022	Tim Walz (DFL)	Peggy Flanagan (DFL)	Steve Simon (DFL)	Keith Ellison (DFL)	Julie Blaha (DFL)	34R, 31DFL, 2I	69DFL, 64R, 1I (Note: In addition to the five Republicans that do not caucus with the Republic Minority, representative John Thompson was expelled from the Democratic-Farmer-Labor caucus)	Amy Klobuchar (DFL)	Tina Smith (DFL)	4DFL, 4R	Biden/ Harris (D) ✓
2023	Tim Walz (DFL)	Peggy Flanagan (DFL)	Steve Simon (DFL)	Keith Ellison (DFL)	Julie Blaha (DFL)	34DFL, 33R	70DFL, 64R	Amy Klobuchar (DFL)	Tina Smith (DFL)	4DFL, 4R	Biden/ Harris (D) ✓
2024	Tim Walz (DFL)	Peggy Flanagan (DFL)	Steve Simon (DFL)	Keith Ellison (DFL)	Julie Blaha (DFL)	34DFL, 33R	70DFL, 64R	Amy Klobuchar (DFL)	Tina Smith (DFL)	4DFL, 4R	Harris/ Walz (D) ✗
2025	Tim Walz (DFL)	Peggy Flanagan (DFL)	Steve Simon (DFL)	Keith Ellison (DFL)	Julie Blaha (DFL)	34DFL, 33R	67R, 67DFL (Note: Elected a Republican speaker.)	Amy Klobuchar (DFL)	Tina Smith (DFL)	4DFL, 4R	Harris/ Walz (D) ✗
2026	Tim Walz (DFL)	Peggy Flanagan (DFL)	Steve Simon (DFL)	Keith Ellison (DFL)	Julie Blaha (DFL)	34DFL, 33R	67R, 67DFL	Amy Klobuchar (DFL)	Tina Smith (DFL)	4DFL, 4R	Harris/ Walz (D) ✗
2027	Amy Klobuchar (DFL)	Ben Schierer (DFL)	Steve Simon (DFL)	Keith Ellison (DFL)	Zack Filipovich (DFL)	39DFL, 28R	77DFL, 57R	TBD (DFL) (Note: Klobuchar's seat will become vacant when she takes office as governor; she will appoint a DFL successor.)	Peggy Flanagan (DFL)	5DFL, 3R	Harris/ Walz (D) ✗

== See also ==
- Politics in Minnesota
- Politics of Minnesota
- List of political parties in Minnesota
