= 1998 Minnesota State Treasurer election =

1998 Minnesota State Teasurer election
- November 3, 1998

Nominee	Carol C. Johnson	Kevin Knight	James N. Dunlop
Party	Democratic (DFL)	Republican	Reform
Popular vote	887,025	791,723	235,109
Percentage	45.39%	41.20%	12.03%
State Auditor before election
Michael McGrath
Democratic (DFL)
Elected State Auditor
Carol C. Johnson
Democratic (DFL)

The 1998 Minnesota State Treasurer election was held on November 3, 1998, in order to elect the Minnesota State Treasurer. This was the last election for this office before 1998 Minnesota Amendment 2 took effect in 2003, abolishing the position.

== General election ==
On election day, November 3, 1998, Minnesota Democratic–Farmer–Labor Party nominee Carol C. Johnson won against her foremost opponent Minnesota Republican Party nominee Kevin Knight, thereby retaining DFL control over the office.

=== Results ===
Minnesota State Auditor election, 1998
Party	Candidate	Votes	%
Democratic (DFL)	Carol C. Johnson	887,025	45.39
Republican	Kevin Knight	791,723	41.20
Reform	James N. Dunlop	235,109	12.03
Libertarian	Mitchell Berg	37,855	1.94
Write-in		2,354	0.12
Total votes		1,954,066	100.00
Democratic (DFL) hold			
