= 1970 Minnesota State Auditor election =

- November 3, 1970
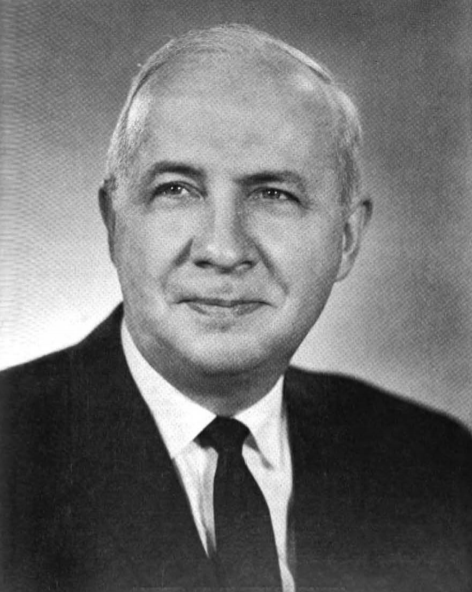

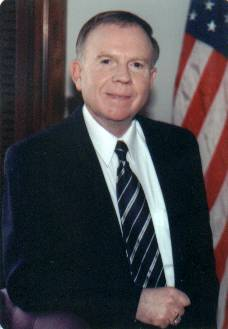
| Nominee | Rolland Hatfield | Jon Wefald |
| Party | Republican | Democratic (DFL) |
| Popular vote | 654,074 | 644,343 |
| Percentage | 49.89% | 49.14% |
- County results Hatfield: 40-50% 50–60% 60–70% Wefald: 40-50% 50–60% 60–70% 70–80%
State Auditor before election
William O'Brien (acting)
Republican
Elected State Auditor
Rolland Hatfield
Republican

The 1970 Minnesota State Auditor election was held on November 3, 1970, in order to elect the state auditor of Minnesota. Republican nominee Rolland Hatfield defeated Democratic–Farmer–Labor nominee Jon Wefald and Communist nominee Betty M. Smith.

== General election ==
On election day, November 3, 1970, Republican nominee Rolland Hatfield won the election by a margin of 9,731 votes against his foremost opponent Democratic–Farmer–Labor nominee Jon Wefald, thereby retaining Republican control over the office of state auditor. Hatfield was sworn in as the 12th state auditor of Minnesota on January 5, 1971.

=== Results ===
Minnesota state auditor election, 1970
| Party | Candidate | Votes | % |
|---|---|---|---|
| Republican | Rolland Hatfield | 654,074 | 49.89 |
| Democratic (DFL) | Jon Wefald | 644,343 | 49.14 |
| Communist | Betty M. Smith | 12,753 | 0.97 |
| Total votes | | 1,311,170 | 100.00 |
| Republican hold | | | |
