= 1954 United States Senate election in Minnesota =

- November 2, 1954
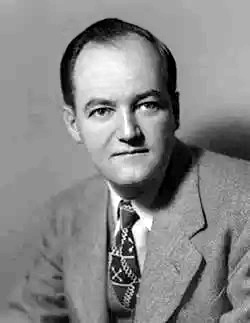

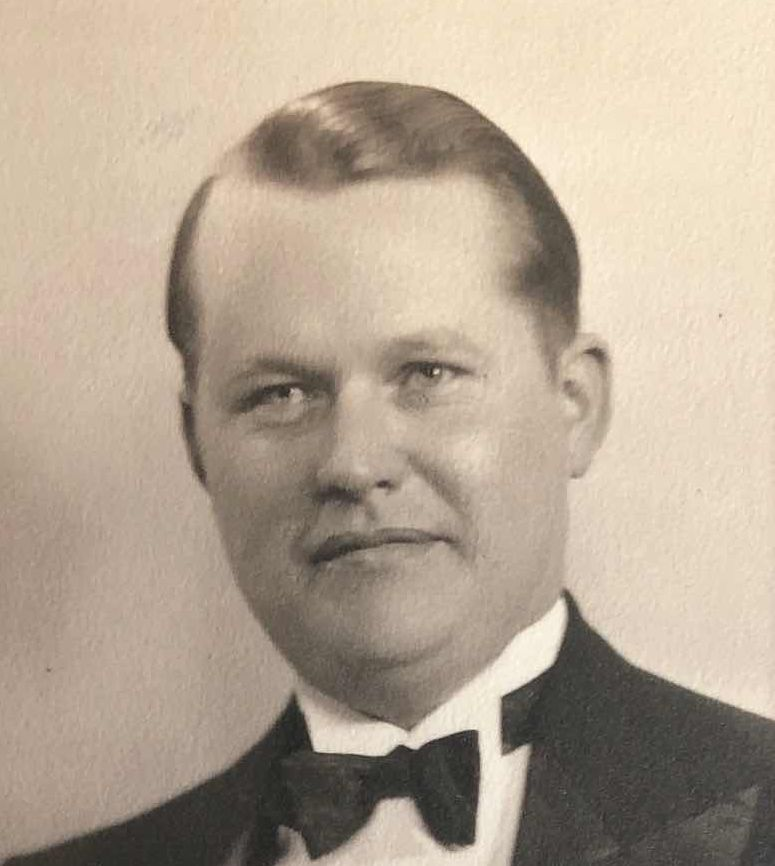
Nominee	Hubert H. Humphrey	Val Bjornson
Party	Democratic (DFL)	Republican
Popular vote	642,193	479,619
Percentage	56.39%	42.11%
- County results Humphrey: 40–50% 50–60% 60–70% 70–80% Bjornson: 40–50% 50–60% 60–70%
U.S. senator before election
Hubert H. Humphrey
Democratic (DFL)
Elected U.S. Senator
Hubert H. Humphrey
Democratic (DFL)

The 1954 United States Senate election in Minnesota took place on November 2, 1954. Incumbent Democratic U.S. Senator Hubert H. Humphrey defeated Republican Minnesota State Treasurer Val Bjornson, to become the first Democrat to win a second term in the state.

== Democratic–Farmer-Labor primary ==
=== Candidates ===
==== Declared ====
- A. B. Gilbert
- Hubert H. Humphrey, Incumbent U.S. Senator since 1949
- Harold Strom

=== Results ===
Democratic primary election results
Party	Candidate	Votes	%
Democratic (DFL)	Hubert H. Humphrey (Incumbent)	319,194	93.95%
Democratic (DFL)	Harold Strom	11,707	3.44%
Democratic (DFL)	A. B. Gilbert	8,863	2.61%
Total votes		339,764	100.00%

== Republican primary ==
=== Candidates ===
==== Declared ====
- Val Bjornson, Minnesota State Treasurer since 1951
- Arthur D. Russell
- Richard S. (Dick) Wilcox

=== Results ===
Republican primary election results
Party	Candidate	Votes	%
Republican	Val Bjornson	237,690	87.61%
Republican	Arthur D. Russel	17,253	6.36%
Republican	Richard S. (Dick) Wilcox	16,347	6.03%
Total votes		271,290	100.00%

== General election ==
=== Results ===
General election results
Party	Candidate	Votes	%
Democratic (DFL)	Hubert H. Humphrey (Incumbent)	642,193	56.39%
Republican	Val Bjornson	479,619	42.11%
Independent	Frank Patrick Ryan	12,457	1.09%
Socialist Workers	Vincent R. Dunne	4,683	0.41%
Total votes		1,138,952	100.00%
Majority		162,574	14.28%
Democratic (DFL) hold			

== See also ==
- United States Senate elections, 1954
