= 2002 Minnesota State Auditor election =

- November 5, 2002
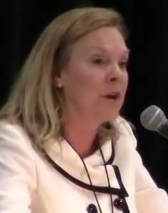

Nominee	Patricia Anderson	Carol C. Johnson	Dave Hutcheson
Party	Republican	Democratic (DFL)	Independence
Popular vote	956,104	941,129	164,532
Percentage	44.63%	43.93%	7.68%
- County results Anderson: 40-50% 50-60% 60-70% Johnson: 40-50% 50-60% 60-70%
State Auditor before election
Judi Dutcher
Democratic (DFL)
Elected State Auditor
Patricia Anderson
Republican

The 2002 Minnesota State Auditor election was held on November 5, 2002, in order to elect the State Auditor of Minnesota. Republican nominee Patricia Anderson defeated Democratic–Farmer–Labor nominee and incumbent State Treasurer Carol C. Johnson, Independence nominee Dave Hutcheson and Green nominee Dave Berger.

As of 2026, this is the last time a Republican was elected Minnesota State Auditor.

== General election ==
On election day, November 5, 2002, Republican nominee Patricia Anderson won the election by a margin of 14,975 votes against her foremost opponent Democratic–Farmer–Labor nominee Carol C. Johnson, thereby gaining Republican control over the office of state auditor. Anderson was sworn in as the 17th state auditor of Minnesota on January 3, 2003.

=== Results ===
Minnesota State Auditor election, 2002
Party	Candidate	Votes	%
Republican	Patricia Anderson	956,104	44.63
Democratic (DFL)	Carol C. Johnson	941,129	43.93
Independence	Dave Hutcheson	164,532	7.68
Green	Dave Berger	78,611	3.67
Write-in		1,881	0.10
Total votes		2,142,257	100.00
Republican gain from Democratic (DFL)			
