= J. Robert Stassen =

American politician

Bob Stassen
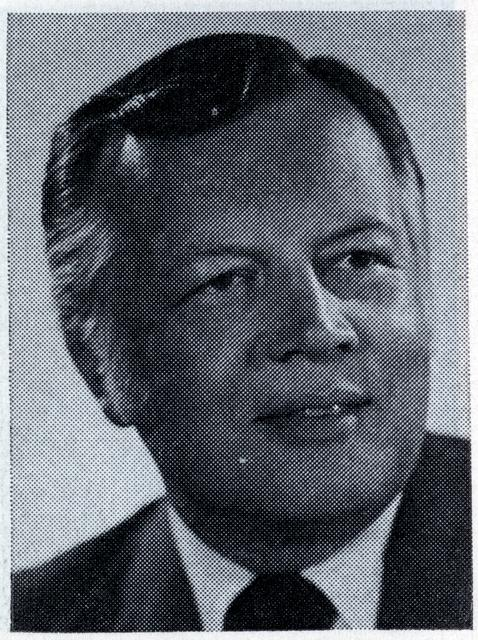
- Stassen in 1973

Member of the Minnesota Senate from the 52nd district
- In office January 2, 1973 – January 3, 1977
- Preceded by: Norman W. Hanson, Sr.
- Succeeded by: Conrado Vega

Personal details
- Born: J. Robert Stassen; August 15, 1927 West St. Paul, Minnesota, U.S.
- Died: October 15, 2015 (aged 88) West St. Paul, Minnesota, U.S.
- Party: Republican
- Relations: Harold Stassen (uncle)
- Education: University of Minnesota (BA)

Military service
- Branch/service: United States Navy
- Battles/wars: World War II

J. Robert "Bob" Stassen (August 15, 1927 – October 15, 2015) was an American businessman, Baptist minister, and politician.

== Early life and education ==
Stassen was born in West St. Paul, Minnesota; his uncle was Harold Stassen, who served as governor of Minnesota. Stassen graduated from South St. Paul High School and then served in the United States Navy during World War II. In 1951, Stassen received his Bachelor of Arts degree in philosophy from the University of Minnesota. He received a specialist degree from the Bethel Seminary and attended the William Mitchell College of Law.

== Career ==
Stassen worked in the life insurance and banking businesses. He was also the president of the West St. Paul State Bank. From 1973 to 1976, Stassen served in the Minnesota Senate as a Republican. In 1974, Stassen was the Republican nominee for Minnesota state treasurer, losing to Jim Lord.

In 1981, Stassen was appointed to the Metropolitan Airports Commission.

== Personal life ==
Stassen died in West St. Paul, Minnesota.
