= Senator Gooding (disambiguation) =

Frank R. Gooding (1859–1928) was a U.S. Senator from Idaho. Senator Gooding may also refer to:

- Arthur C. Gooding (1871–1971), Minnesota State Senate
- Henry C. Gooding (1838–1913), Indiana State Senate
