= Dinehart =

Dinehart is a surname. Notable people with the surname include:

- Alan Dinehart (1889–1944), American actor and director
- Clarence C. Dinehart (1877–1910), American banker and politician
- Mason Alan Dinehart (born 1936), American businessman
