= 1998 Minnesota Amendment 2 =

Minnesota Amendment 2
- November 3, 1998

Results
Choice	Votes	%
Yes	1,087,789	55.97%
No	855,853	44.03%
Valid votes	1,943,642	92.32%
Invalid or blank votes	161,701	7.68%
Total votes	2,105,343	100.00%

1998 Minnesota Amendment 2 was a legislatively referred constitutional amendment. The amendment amended Articles V, VIII, and XI of the Minnesota Constitution to abolish the office of Minnesota State Treasurer. The duties of the State Treasurer would be transferred at the recommendation of whoever was incumbent Treasurer in 2000, and the office would be abolished upon the expiration of that term in 2003. The amendment was accepted with 55.97% of the vote.

The incumbent Treasurer at the time was Michael McGrath, and Carol C. Johnson was elected at the same time the amendment was passed. The question on the ballot read: "Shall the Minnesota Constitution be amended to abolish the office of state treasurer?"

== Results ==
Choice	Votes	%
For	1,087,789	55.97
Against	855,853	44.03
Total	1,943,642	100.00
Blank votes	161,701	7.68
