= Conrado Vega =

American politician

Conrad Vega

Member of the Minnesota Senate from the 52nd district
- In office 1977–1985
- Preceded by: J. Robert Stassen
- Succeeded by: Jim Metzen

Personal details
- Born: Conrado M. Vega; June 22, 1938 South St. Paul, Minnesota, U.S.
- Died: December 26, 2010 (aged 72) Inver Grove Heights, Minnesota, U.S.
- Party: Democratic
- Education: University of St. Thomas (BA)

Conrado M. "Conrad" Vega (June 22, 1938 – December 26, 2010) was an American politician and educator.

== Early life and education ==
Born in South St. Paul, Minnesota, Vega received his bachelor's degree from University of St. Thomas.

== Career ==
Vega taught social studies at Lakeville North High School. He was the first Hispanic state senator in Minnesota. Vega served in the Minnesota Senate from 1977 to 1985 as a Democrat.
