= Charles Kittelson =

American banker and politician (1837–1914)

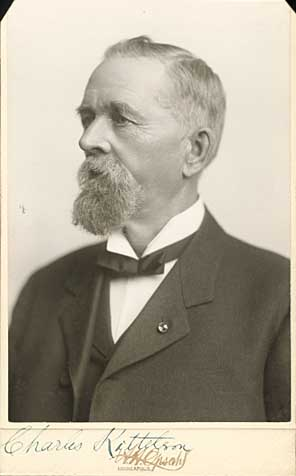
- Kittelson c.1900

7th Minnesota State Treasurer
- In office January 10, 1880 – January 5, 1887
- Governor: John S. Pillsbury; Lucius Frederick Hubbard
- Preceded by: William Pfaender
- Succeeded by: Joseph Bobleter

Treasurer of Freeborn County, Minnesota
- In office 1866–1877

Personal details
- Born: December 21, 1837 Sigdal, Norway
- Died: May 24, 1914 (aged 76) Corning, Minnesota, U.S.
- Resting place: Red Oak Grove Cemetery, Austin, Minnesota, U.S.
- Other political affiliations: Republican

Military service
- Allegiance: United States of America
- Branch/service: Union Army
- Years of service: 1862–1865
- Rank: First Lieutenant
- Unit: 10th Minnesota Infantry Regiment
- Commands: Company E, 10th Minnesota Infantry Regiment
- Battles/wars: Dakota War of 1862; Sibley's 1863 Campaign; American Civil War

Charles Kittelson (December 21, 1837 – May 24, 1914), also written as Kittleson, was a Norwegian American soldier, banker, and politician who served three consecutive terms as the seventh Minnesota State Treasurer from 1880 to 1887.

== Early life and career ==
Charles Kittelson was born on December 21, 1837, in Sigdal, Norway (then part of the Union of Sweden and Norway). Kittelson emigrated to the United States at the age of 13 and initially resided in Wisconsin for seven years before moving to the city of Albert Lea in Freeborn County, Minnesota. While in Albert Lea Kittelson worked at a mill before being employed as a store clerk and later the proprietor of a saloon.

=== Military service ===
At the outbreak of the Dakota War of 1862 Kittelson volunteered for service in the Union Army and was mustered into service on September 2, 1862, as a Lieutenant in Company E of the 10th Minnesota Infantry Regiment. Kittelson subsequently served in Sibley's 1863 Campaign in the Dakota Territory where the 10th Minnesota fought against the Dakota people at the Battle of Big Mound, the Battle of Dead Buffalo Lake, and the Battle of Stony Lake. Kittelson and the rest of the regiment later took part in the Western theater of the American Civil War at the Battle of Tupelo, the Battle of Westport, the Battle of Nashville, the Battle of Spanish Fort, and the Battle of Fort Blakeley. Kittelson mustered out of service at Fort Snelling on August 18, 1865, with the rest of the regiment. Immediately following the war Kittelson became a member of the Military Order of the Loyal Legion of the United States.

=== Politics ===
Following his military service Kittelson ran for the political office of treasurer of Freeborn County, Minnesota in 1866 and served until 1877. Beginning in 1879 Kittelson ran for the political office of Minnesota State Treasurer as a Republican during the 1879 Minnesota General Election and won 56.93% of the majority vote with a margin of victory of +20.00%, soundly defeating the Democrat candidate Lyman E. Cowdery, the Greenback Party candidate Joseph Goar, and the Prohibition Party candidate John M. Dunham. Kittelson ran again for the office of state treasurer as a Republican in both 1881 and 1883 which he won both times. Kittelson held the office of state treasurer for a total of three consecutive terms under the administrations of Minnesota governors John S. Pillsbury and Lucius Frederick Hubbard from 1880 to 1887.

=== Businesses ===
In 1892 following his political career Kittelson assisted his brother, Halvor Kittelson, and others in establishing the Co-operative Creamery Company, an agricultural cooperative creamery for dairy farmers in Mower County, Minnesota. Kittelson was later involved in banking and became the president of the Columbia National Bank in Saint Paul, Minnesota, the bank later defaulted. Kittelson later moved to Montevideo, Minnesota where he operated a flour mill with his son.

== Personal life ==
According to his obituary Kittelson was married to Wilhelmina Anderson, together they had seven children. Kittelson had a younger brother, Halvor Kittelson, who was a veteran of the 11th Minnesota Infantry Regiment.

== Death ==
According to the Minnesota Historical Society and his official obituary, Kittelson died on May 24, 1914. Kittelson's death certificate was later confirmed on May 27, 1914.

Political offices
Preceded by William Pfaender	Treasurer of Minnesota; 1880-1887	Succeeded by August T. Koerner
