= Val Bjornson =

American politician (1906–1987)

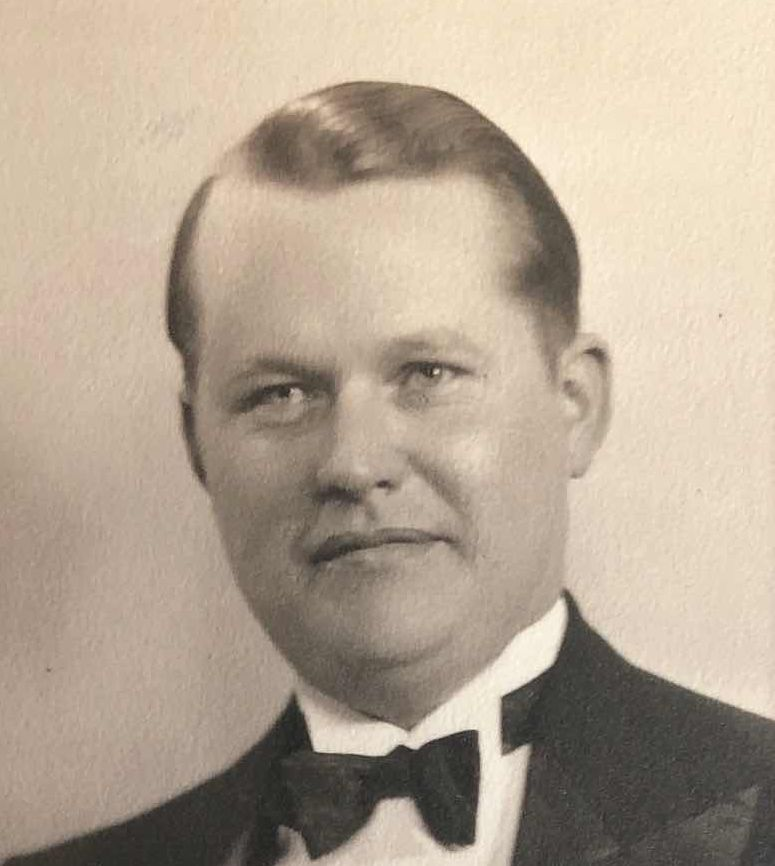
K. Valdimar Bjornson, known in politics as Val Bjornson, in his 20s.

Kristjan Valdimar "Val" Bjornson (August 29, 1906 – March 10, 1987) was an American writer, newspaper editor, and politician who served as the state treasurer of Minnesota for more than two decades.

Bjornson was born in Minneota, Minnesota of Icelandic descent. In World War II, he served in Navy intelligence, stationed in Iceland. Besides English, he was fluent in Icelandic, Finnish, Danish, Swedish, and Norwegian.

He was part owner of the Minneota Mascot newspaper and an associate editor at the St. Paul Pioneer Press.

Running as the Republican candidate in the 1954 United States Senate elections, Bjornson lost to Hubert Humphrey, with whom he sometimes shared a car to travel around the state.

Bjornson died in Minneapolis on March 10, 1987. The University of Minnesota, his alma mater, and the University of Iceland have a student exchange scholarship named in his honor.

== Bibliography ==
- Bjornson, Val (1969). The History of Minnesota. West Palm Beach, Florida: Lewis Historical Publishing.

Party political offices
Preceded by Julius A. Schmahl	Republican nominee for Minnesota State Treasurer; 1950, 1952	Succeeded by Duane R. Lund
Preceded by Joseph H. Ball	Republican nominee for U.S. Senator from Minnesota (Class 2); 1954	Succeeded by P. Kenneth Peterson
Preceded by Duane R. Lund	Republican nominee for Minnesota State Treasurer; 1956, 1958, 1960, 1962, 1966, 1970	Succeeded by J. Robert Stassen
Political offices
Preceded by Julius A. Schmahl	Treasurer of Minnesota; 1951–1955	Succeeded by Arthur Hansen
Preceded by Arthur Hansen	Treasurer of Minnesota; 1957–1975	Succeeded by Jim Lord
