= 1974 Minnesota State Auditor election =

- November 5, 1974
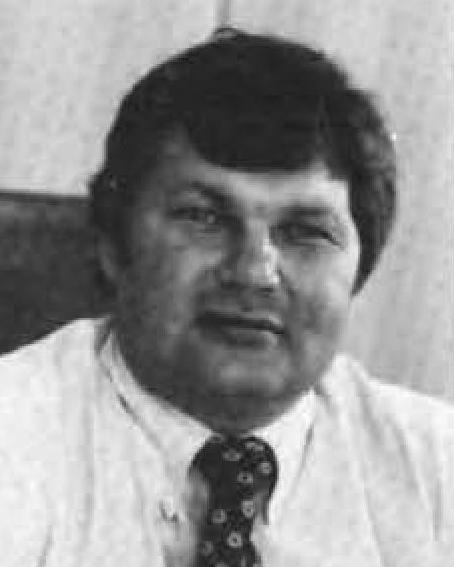

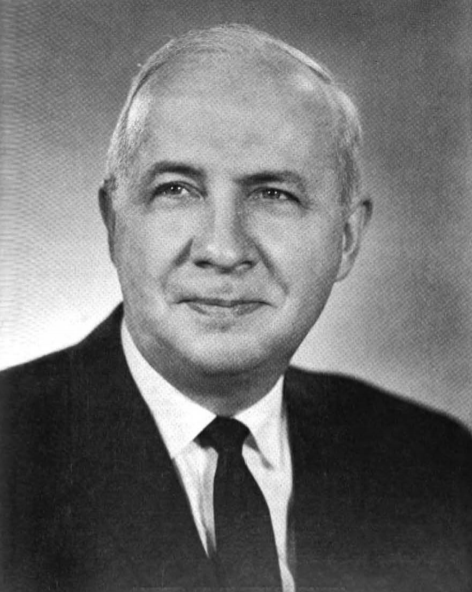
Nominee	Robert W. Mattson Jr.	Rolland Hatfield
Party	Democratic (DFL)	Republican
Popular vote	627,888	570,562
Percentage	52.39%	47.61%
- County results Mattson: 50–60% 60–70% 70–80% Hatfield: 50–60% 60–70%
State Auditor before election
Rolland Hatfield
Republican
Elected State Auditor
Robert W. Mattson Jr.
Democratic (DFL)

The 1974 Minnesota State Auditor election was held on November 5, 1974, in order to elect the state auditor of Minnesota. Democratic–Farmer–Labor nominee Robert W. Mattson Jr. defeated Republican nominee and incumbent state auditor Rolland Hatfield.

== General election ==
On election day, November 5, 1974, Democratic–Farmer–Labor nominee Robert W. Mattson Jr. won the election by a margin of 57,326 votes against his opponent Republican nominee Rolland Hatfield, thereby gaining Democratic–Farmer–Labor control over the office of state auditor. Mattson was sworn in as the 13th state auditor of Minnesota on January 6, 1975.

=== Results ===
Minnesota State Auditor election, 1974
Party	Candidate	Votes	%
Democratic (DFL)	Robert W. Mattson Jr.	627,888	52.39
Republican	Rolland Hatfield (incumbent)	570,562	47.61
Total votes		1,198,450	100.00
Democratic (DFL) gain from Republican			
