= Walter J. Smith =

American banker and politician (1870–1950)

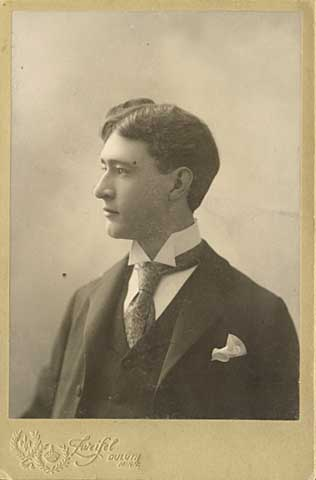
- Smith c.1890

13th Minnesota State Treasurer
- In office January 3, 1911 – February 14, 1916
- Governor: Adolph Olson Eberhart; Winfield Scott Hammond; Joseph A. A. Burnquist
- Preceded by: Elias Steele Pettijohn
- Succeeded by: Arthur C. Gooding

Mayor of Eveleth, Minnesota
- In office 1908–1910

Personal details
- Born: October 5, 1870 Eureka, Kansas, U.S.
- Died: October 19, 1950 (aged 80)

Walter J. Smith (October 5, 1870 – October 19, 1950) was an American banker and politician who served as the mayor of Eveleth, Minnesota and three consecutive terms as the thirteenth Minnesota State Treasurer. Smith was later forced to resign from the position of state treasurer following an indictment for the mishandling of state trust funds in 1916.

== Early life and career ==
Walter J. Smith was born on October 5, 1870 in Eureka, Kansas, while still a child Smith's family relocated to Bellevue, Ohio. Smith was educated in Cleveland at a business college before working for the First National Bank in Bellevue. According to the Minnesota Republican newspaper The Appeal, Smith began working in Minnesota as a banker beginning in 1893.

By 1900 Smith was employed as one of the directors of the First National Bank of Eveleth in Eveleth, Minnesota and was also the bank's cashier. Smith was later the president and director of the Miners National Bank of Eveleth which was incorporated in 1903. Later in 1908 Smith was appointed as the mayor of Eveleth following the death of mayor M. B. Maxwell and served as the city's mayor until 1910.

== Politics ==
Beginning in 1910 Smith ran for the political office of Minnesota State Treasurer as a nominee for the Republican Party of Minnesota against Minnesota Democratic Party nominee Charles F. Ladner. Smith won a total of 177,436 votes (or 66.47% of the majority vote) with a margin of victory of +32.75%. Smith would win a total of five elections for the office of state treasurer in 1910, 1912 (both primary and general elections) and 1914 (both primary and general elections). In total, Smith served in the cabinets of three different Minnesota governors, those being; Adolph Olson Eberhart, Winfield Scott Hammond, and Joseph A. A. Burnquist.

=== 1916 resignation ===
According to the Minnesota Historical Election Archive Smith was forced to resign on February 12, 1916 following an indictment by a grand jury for the mishandling of $28,000 in permanent state trust funds. Arthur C. Gooding was appointed by Minnesota Governor Joseph A. A. Burnquist to succeeded Smith as state treasurer and would serve as treasurer until January 2, 1917 when he was replaced by the newly elected Henry Rines.

Political offices
Preceded by Elias Steele Pettijohn	Treasurer of Minnesota; 1911-1916	Succeeded by Arthur C. Gooding
