= Julius H. Block =

American businessman and politician

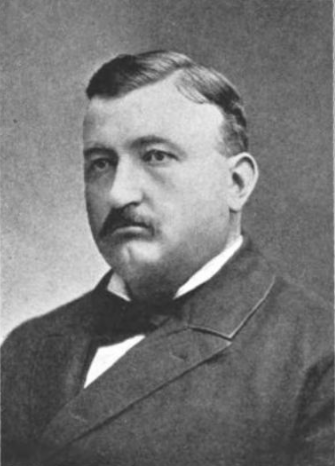

Treasurer of Minnesota
- In office 1901–1907

Personal details
- Born: Julius Herrman Block; March 30, 1860 Galion, Ohio, U.S.
- Died: September 26, 1915 (aged 55) Duluth, Minnesota, U.S.
- Party: Republican
- Occupation: Businessman, politician

Julius Herrman Block (sometimes Bloch) (March 30, 1860 – September 26, 1915) was an American businessman and politician.

== Biography ==
Block was born in Galion, Ohio and he moved with his parents to Le Sueur County, Minnesota. In 1880, Block worked as a storekeeper at the Minnesota State Hospital for the Insane in St. Peter, Minnesota. He served on the St. Peter Police Force and as the Nicollet County, Minnesota sheriff. He was a Republican. In 1883 and 1884, Block served as a corporal in the Minnesota State Militia, Company I. Block served as the Minnesota State Treasurer from 1901 to 1907. After he left office, Block was the editor of a monthly literary magazine published in Duluth, Minnesota: The Bull's Eye. Block died in Duluth, Minnesota from Bright's Disease.

== Notes ==
Political offices
Preceded by August T. Koerner	Treasurer of Minnesota; 1901–1907	Succeeded by Clarence C. Dinehart
