= William Pfaender =

German-American politician (1826–1905)

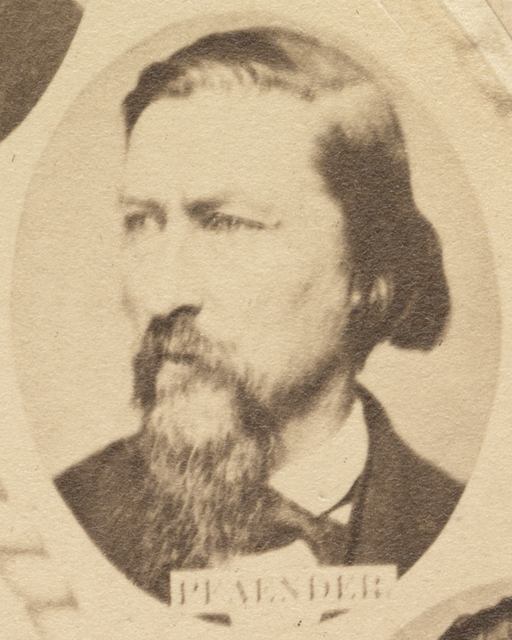

6th Minnesota State Treasurer
- In office January 7, 1876 – January 10, 1880
- Governor: John S. Pillsbury
- Preceded by: Edwin W. Dyke
- Succeeded by: Charles Kittleson

Member of the Minnesota Senate from the 19th District and 37th District
- In office January 4, 1870 – January 6, 1873
- Governor: Horace Austin

Member of the Minnesota House of Representatives from the 17th District
- In office December 7, 1859 – January 7, 1861
- Governor: Alexander Ramsey

Personal details
- Born: Jakob Wilhelm Pfänder; July 26, 1826 Heilbronn, Kingdom of Württemberg
- Died: August 11, 1905 (aged 79) New Ulm, Minnesota, U.S.
- Other political affiliations: Republican

Military service
- Allegiance: United States of America
- Branch/service: Union Army
- Years of service: 1862–1866
- Rank: Lieutenant Colonel
- Unit: 1st Minnesota Cavalry Regiment; 2nd Minnesota Cavalry Regiment
- Battles/wars: Sioux Wars; Dakota War of 1862; Sibley's 1863 Campaign; Sully's Expedition (1863–1864)

William Pfaender Sr. (born Jakob Wilhelm Pfänder, July 6, 1826 – August 11, 1905) was a German-American politician and businessman. His son was Albert Pfaender.

== Biography ==
Pfaender was born in Heilbronn, Kingdom of Württemberg. His father was a craftsman who made barrels so the family called the younger Pfaender by his middle name. Growing up in Heilbronn and Ulm, Pfaender was influenced by the Turner movement which encouraged gymnastics and exercise while promoting nationalism, political and religious freedom, education, and equality.

Pfaender emigrated to the United States in 1848 amid the turmoil of the 1848 revolution. He first travelled to England, where he met Karl Marx and Friedrich Engels. He then went to New York. In 1848, he moved to Cincinnati, Ohio. In Cincinnati, he founded a Turner Society for which he served as its first president. He married Catherine Pfau, who was from a Turner family, in 1851. They went on to have fifteen children together.

In 1855, Pfaender wrote a letter for the national Turner newspaper Die Turnzeitung on "Practical Turnerism", in which he called for creating a German American colony to free Germans from harassment by nativists and practice German customs. This led to the creation of the Settlement Association of the Socialist Turner Society.

The Chicago Land Association had already started to build a new town for German Americans in 1854 on the banks of the Minnesota River. Turner and the Cincinnati group joined and helped to purchase more land. He moved in 1856 as being due to an attack by Know Nothings on Pfaender's family and other German immigrant families at a picnic. Because of this, Pfaender organized a move to New Ulm, Minnesota Territory. Pfaender was in the real estate and insurance business; he was also in the lumber business.

Pfaender helped to form the New Ulm Turner Society in 1856. The town of New Ulm was incorporated in 1857, and the German Land Association set up a mill and a store. However, individuals soon took ownership and the association dissolved in 1859. Pfaender served as president of the new town's city council and as its postmaster. He performed the first marriage held in New Ulm on March 17, 1857. He also served as a member of the Electoral College and voted for Abraham Lincoln in the 1860 election.

During the American Civil War, Pfaender first served in the 1st Minnesota Cavalry Regiment from 1862-1863, followed by the 2nd Minnesota Cavalry Regiment from 1863-1866 with the rank of Lieutenant Colonel. He was in charge of Fort Ridgely until 1865.

After the Civil War, Pfaender served as mayor of New Ulm and on the New Ulm school board. He also served as register for Brown County, Minnesota and as postmaster. In 1859 and 1860, Pfaender served in the Minnesota House of Representatives and was a Republican. Then, from 1869 to 1873, Pfaender served in the Minnesota State Senate. From 1876 to 1880, Pfaender served as the Minnesota State Treasurer.

Pfaender died at his home in New Ulm, Minnesota.

== Family ==
British entertainer and fashion designer Victoria Beckham is Pfaender's great-great-great-grandniece.

Pfaender's son, Fred Pfaender, was the Brown County register of deeds in 1896. His youngest son Herman inherited his farm and grew corn, wheat, and Hereford cattle, as well as serving as the Milford Township Town Clerk and on a number of local boards. Pfaender's great-great grandchild Willis Runck owns the farm that Pfaender lived on.

Political offices
Preceded by Edwin W. Dyke	Treasurer of Minnesota; 1876–1880	Succeeded by Charles Kittleson
