= Joseph Bobleter =

American newspaper editor and politician

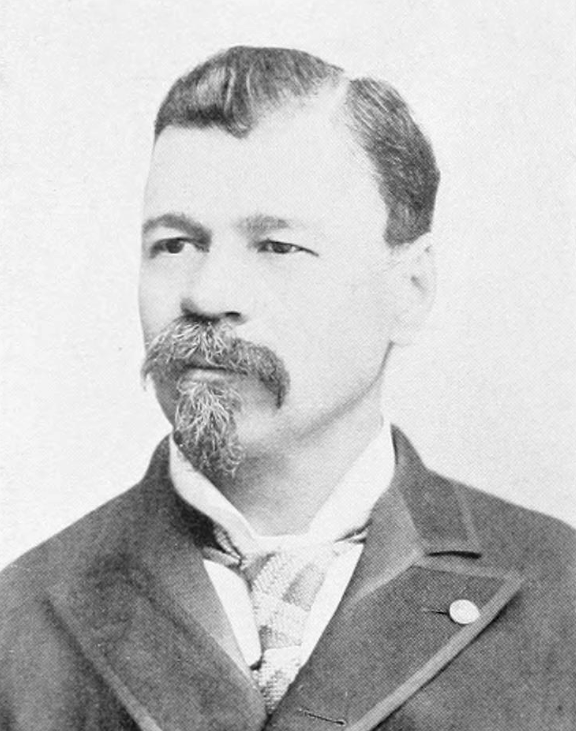

Minnesota State Treasurer
- In office 1887–1895
- Preceded by: Charles Kittelson
- Succeeded by: August Theodor Koerner

Member of the Minnesota House of Representatives
- In office 1883–1884

Personal details
- Born: April 19, 1846 Dornbirn, Austria
- Died: July 3, 1909 (aged 63) New Ulm, Minnesota, U.S.
- Resting place: New Ulm City Cemetery
- Party: Republican
- Spouse: Mary Schneider (m. 1879)
- Children: 8
- Occupation: Newspaper editor, politician

Joseph Bobleter (April 19, 1846 – July 3, 1909) was an American newspaper editor and politician.

== Early life and career ==
Joseph Bobleter was born in Dornbirn, Austria on April 19, 1846. He lived in New Ulm, Minnesota and was the editor/publisher of the New Ulm Review newspaper. He served in the 2nd Regiment Iowa Volunteer Cavalry during the American Civil War. He then served in the Minnesota National Guard was the adjutant general after the American Civil War. In 1883 and 1884, Bobleter served in the Minnesota House of Representatives and was a Republican. He also served as the mayor of New Ulm, Minnesota and as postmaster for New Ulm. From 1887 to 1895, Bobleter served as Minnesota State Treasurer.

== Personal life ==
He married Mary Schneider on September 5, 1879, and they had eight children.

== Death ==
Bobleter died in New Ulm on July 3, 1909.

== Notes ==
Political offices
Preceded by Charles Kittleson	Treasurer of Minnesota; 1887–1895	Succeeded by August T. Koerner
