= Robert W. Mattson Jr. =

American lawyer

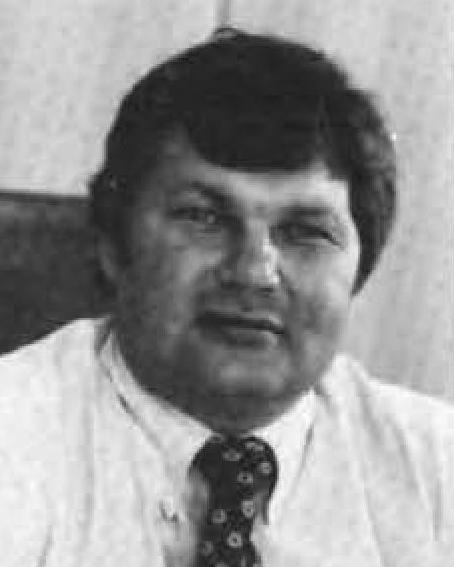

24th Minnesota State Treasurer
- In office January 2, 1983 – January 5, 1987
- Governor: Rudy Perpich
- Preceded by: Jim Lord
- Succeeded by: Michael A. McGrath

13th Minnesota State Auditor
- In office January 6, 1975 – January 4, 1979
- Governor: Wendell Anderson; Rudy Perpich
- Preceded by: Rolland Hatfield
- Succeeded by: Arne Carlson

Personal details
- Born: May 31, 1948 (age 78) Virginia, Minnesota, U.S.
- Party: Minnesota Democratic-Farmer-Labor
- Spouse: Marge
- Profession: Lawyer

Robert W. (Bob) Mattson Jr. (born May 31, 1948) is an American lawyer who held elective political office in Minnesota, and is also involved in various business ventures in Florida, Colorado and Canada. He served one term as Minnesota State Auditor from 1975 to 1979, and was Minnesota State Treasurer from 1983 to 1987. He is a member of the Democratic–Farmer–Labor Party. His father was Minnesota Attorney General Robert W. Mattson Sr.

Mattson was elected State Auditor at the age of 26, the second-youngest person to attain statewide office in Minnesota (the youngest is Jim Lord, who was 25 when elected State Treasurer).

Mattson was born in Virginia, Minnesota. He is a graduate of Bloomington Kennedy High School in Bloomington, Minnesota, Harvard University in Cambridge, Massachusetts, and William Mitchell College of Law in Saint Paul. His business ventures include Michelbob's Championship Ribs restaurants in Naples, Florida and Cochrane Air Service in Cochrane, Ontario, Canada.

Mattson and his wife, Marge, have two children.

== Electoral history ==
=== 1974 ===
1974 Minnesota State Auditor election
Party	Candidate	Votes	%
Democratic (DFL)	Robert W. (Bob) Mattson, Jr.	627,888	52.39
Republican	Rolland F. Hatfield (incumbent)	570,562	47.61
Total votes		1,198,450	100.00
Democratic (DFL) gain from Republican			

Party political offices
Preceded by Jon Wefald	Democratic nominee for Minnesota State Auditor; 1974, 1978	Succeeded by Paul Wellstone
Preceded by Jim Lord	Democratic nominee for Minnesota State Treasurer; 1982	Succeeded by Michael McGrath
Political offices
Preceded by Rolland Hatfield	Minnesota State Auditor; 1975–1979	Succeeded by Arne Carlson
Preceded by Jim Lord	State Treasurer of Minnesota; 1983–1987	Succeeded by Michael A. McGrath
