= Rolland Hatfield =

American politician (1910–1986)

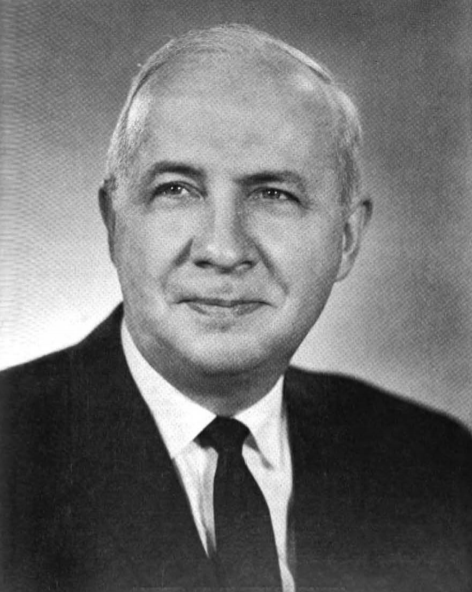

12th Minnesota State Auditor
- In office January 4, 1971 – January 6, 1975
- Preceded by: William O'Brien
- Succeeded by: Robert W. Mattson Jr.

Personal details
- Party: Republican

Rolland Francis Hatfield (February 5, 1910 – April 17, 1986) was an American politician who served as the 12th Minnesota State Auditor from 1971 through 1975. Hatfield, a resident of Ramsey County, Minnesota, was a member of the Minnesota Republican Party.

== Electoral history ==
=== 1970 ===
1970 Minnesota State Auditor election
Party	Candidate	Votes	%
Republican	Rolland F. Hatfield	654,074	49.88
Democratic (DFL)	Jon Wefald	644,343	49.14
Communist	Betty M. Smith	12,753	0.97
Total votes		1,311,170	100.00
Republican hold			

=== 1974 ===
1974 Minnesota State Auditor election
Party	Candidate	Votes	%
Democratic (DFL)	Robert W. (Bob) Mattson Jr.	627,888	52.39
Republican	Rolland Hatfield (incumbent)	570,562	47.61
Total votes		1,198,450	100.00
Democratic (DFL) gain from Republican			

Party political offices
Preceded by Stafford King	Republican nominee for Minnesota State Auditor; 1970, 1974	Succeeded by Arne Carlson
Political offices
Preceded by William O'Brien	Minnesota State Auditor; 1971 – 1975	Succeeded by Robert W. Mattson Jr.
