= Michael McGrath (American politician) =

American politician (1942–2021)

Michael Alan McGrath (October 27, 1942 – January 27, 2021) was an American politician and businessman. He was the first openly gay Minnesota state officer.

== Life and career ==
McGrath was born in Trenton, New Jersey. He graduated from high school in New Smyrna Beach, Florida, in 1961. He served in the United States Air Force before marrying Marsha Palmer of New Smyrna Beach, attending Daytona Beach Community College, and graduating from Stetson University in 1969 with a bachelor's degree in American Studies.

McGrath was employed by International Dairy Queen, Inc., in Bloomington, Minnesota, from 1972 to 1984, ending as a vice president. He next worked as a business consultant and taxi driver, and was active in grassroots politics before defeating the DFL incumbent in the 1986 primary and general elections for Minnesota State Treasurer. He was re-elected in 1990 and 1994 and served until 1999. He also served as president of the National Association of State Treasurers.

McGrath's longtime assistant, Carol Johnson, was elected as the final State Treasurer of Minnesota in 1998 following passage of 1998 Minnesota Amendment 2 to abolish the office on the same ballot.

Michael and Marsha McGrath raised three children before divorcing in 2002. Michael married again in 2013 following marriage equality becoming law in Minnesota.

McGrath died on January 27, 2021, at the age of 78.

Party political offices
Preceded by Robert W. Mattson Jr.	Democratic nominee for Minnesota State Treasurer; 1986, 1990, 1994	Succeeded by Carol C. Johnson
Political offices
Preceded by Robert W. Mattson Jr.	State Treasurer of Minnesota; 1987–1999	Succeeded by Carol C. Johnson
