= Jim Lord =

American lawyer and politician

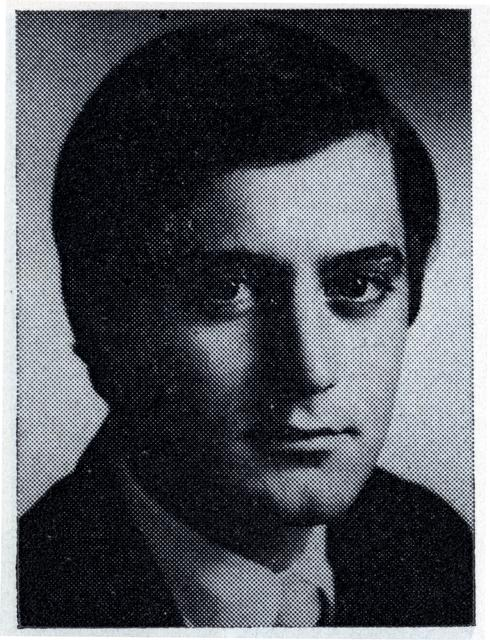
- Lord in 1973

23rd Treasurer of Minnesota
- In office January 6, 1975 – January 3, 1983
- Governor: Wendell R. Anderson
- Preceded by: Val Bjornson
- Succeeded by: Robert W. Mattson Jr.

Member of the Minnesota Senate from the 36th district
- In office January 2, 1973 – November 5, 1974
- Preceded by: Glenn D. McCarty
- Succeeded by: Robert J. Schmitz

Personal details
- Born: James Frank Lord; November 26, 1948 Chanhassen, Minnesota, U.S.
- Died: June 6, 2008 (aged 59) Excelsior, Minnesota, U.S.
- Party: Democratic
- Relations: Miles Lord (father)
- Education: University of Minnesota (BA); William Mitchell College of Law (JD)

James Frank Lord (November 26, 1948 – June 6, 2008) was an American lawyer and politician who served as the Minnesota state treasurer from 1975 to 1983.

== Early life and education ==
Born in Chanhassen, Minnesota, Lord was the son of United States District Court Judge Miles Lord. He earned a Bachelor of Arts degree from the University of Minnesota and a Juris Doctor from the William Mitchell College of Law.

== Career ==
Lord began his career as an aide in the United States Senate for Hubert Humphrey and Walter Mondale. He also served in the United States Merchant Marine. In the 1970s, he served as a liaison between Governor Wendell R. Anderson's office other government agencies. Lord was elected to the Minnesota Senate in 1972 at the age of 23 and served from 1973 to 1975. He served as Minnesota state treasurer from 1975 to 1983.

== Personal life ==
Lord died from a heart attack in 2008. Jim lived with the love of his life, Callie Edwards for 28 years.
