= William O'Brien (Minnesota politician) =

American politician (1930–2007)

- O'Brien in the 1960s

11th Minnesota State Auditor
- In office March 7, 1969 – January 4, 1971
- Governor: Harold LeVander
- Preceded by: Stafford King
- Succeeded by: Rolland Hatfield

Member of the Minnesota House of Representatives for the 45th District
- In office January 8, 1963 – January 2, 1967

Personal details
- Born: February 19, 1930 Jacksonville, Florida, U.S.
- Died: June 25, 2007 (aged 77) Duluth, Minnesota, U.S.
- Party: Republican
- Spouse(s): Patty (divorced); Sandra
- Children: 4 biological, 1 stepchild
- Education: University of Minnesota
- Profession: Investment Counselor

William J. "Bill" O'Brien (February 19, 1930 in Jacksonville, Florida – June 25, 2007) was a Minnesota Republican politician, who served as Minnesota State Auditor and a member of the Minnesota House of Representatives. O'Brien also unsuccessfully sought the office of Minnesota Secretary of State.

Born in Jacksonville, Florida, O'Brien moved to Minnesota in his youth. He graduated from St. Paul Academy, and went on to college at Cornell University, where he studied mechanical engineering. He returned to Minnesota to complete his education, earning a degree in finance. He later worked as an investment counselor.

O'Brien was elected to the Minnesota House of Representatives in 1962, and again in 1964. In 1969, he was appointed to the office of Minnesota State Auditor by governor Harold LeVander.

O'Brien had four daughters and one stepdaughter; he was married twice. He died in 2007.

Party political offices
Preceded by Norbert A. McCrady	Republican nominee for Minnesota Secretary of State; 1966	Succeeded by Arlen Erdahl
Political offices
Preceded by Stafford King	Minnesota State Auditor; 1969 – 1971	Succeeded by Rolland Hatfield
