= August Theodor Koerner =

American businessman and politician (1843–1912)

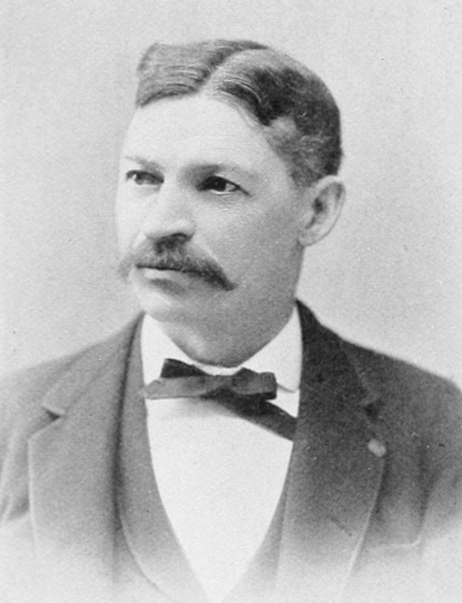

Minnesota State Treasurer
- In office 1895–1901

Member of the Minnesota House of Representatives
- In office 1893–1894

Personal details
- Born: July 7, 1843 Bad Rodach, Germany
- Died: April 17, 1912 (aged 68) Litchfield, Minnesota, U.S.
- Party: Democratic; Republican; Greenback
- Spouse: Kate McGannon
- Children: 6
- Occupation: Businessman, politician

August Theodor Koerner (July 7, 1843 – April 17, 1912) was an American businessman and politician.

== Biography ==
August Theodor Koerner was born in Bad Rodach, Saxe-Coburg and Gotha, as the son of shoemaker Georg Koerner and his wife Dorothea née Siegmund. He emigrated to the United States in 1857 and settled in Vernon, Indiana, working in a mill. During the American Civil War, Koerner served in the 6th Indiana Infantry Regiment.

After, the war, Koerner moved to Troy, Illinois and worked as a bookkeeper. He married Kate McGannon and they had six children.

In 1867, he moved with his wife and family to Litchfield, Meeker County, Minnesota. Koerner was in the real estate, abstract, and insurance business. He served as Litchfield Village Clerk and as Meeker County Register of Deeds. Koerner also served as postmaster for Litchfield, Minnesota. In 1893 and 1894, Koerner served in the Minnesota House of Representatives and was a Republican since 1874. Before Koerner was involved with the Republican Party, he was a Democrat. From 1868 to 1874, Koerner was a member of the Greenback Party From 1895 to 1901, Koerner served as Minnesota State Treasurer.

He died in the Mounds Park sanatorium in St. Paul from heart problems on April 17, 1912. He had been there for only a week.

== Notes ==
Political offices
Preceded by Joseph Bobleter	Treasurer of Minnesota; 1895–1901	Succeeded by Julius H. Block
