= Clarence C. Dinehart =

American banker and politician

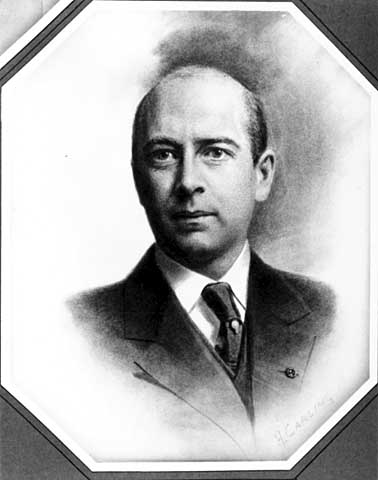
- Dinehart c.1907

Minnesota State Treasurer
- In office January 7, 1907 – June 8, 1910
- Preceded by: Julius H. Block
- Succeeded by: Elias Steele Pettijohn

Personal details
- Born: April 3, 1877 Chicago, Illinois
- Died: June 8, 1910 (aged 33)
- Other political affiliations: Republican

Clarence Christopher Dinehart (April 3, 1877 – June 8, 1910) was an American banker and politician.

Dinehart was born in Chicago, Illinois. He moved with his parents in 1884 to Slayton, Minnesota. Dinehart went to the Slayton Public Schools and the Central High School in Minneapolis, Minnesota. In 1899, Dinehart graduated from University of Minnesota. In 1905, he graduated from the Harvard Law School. He worked for the State Bank of Slayton. Dinehart served as president of the Slayton Village Board as a Republican. Dinehart served as Minnesota State Treasurer from 1907 until his death. Dinehart died at Luther Hospital, in Saint Paul, Minnesota, from complications after undergoing surgery for appendicitis. He was seeking the Republican nomination for the United States House of Representatives from Minnesota.

== Notes ==
Political offices
Preceded by Julius H. Block	Treasurer of Minnesota; 1907–1910	Succeeded by Elias Steele Pettijohn
