= Arthur C. Gooding =

American politician

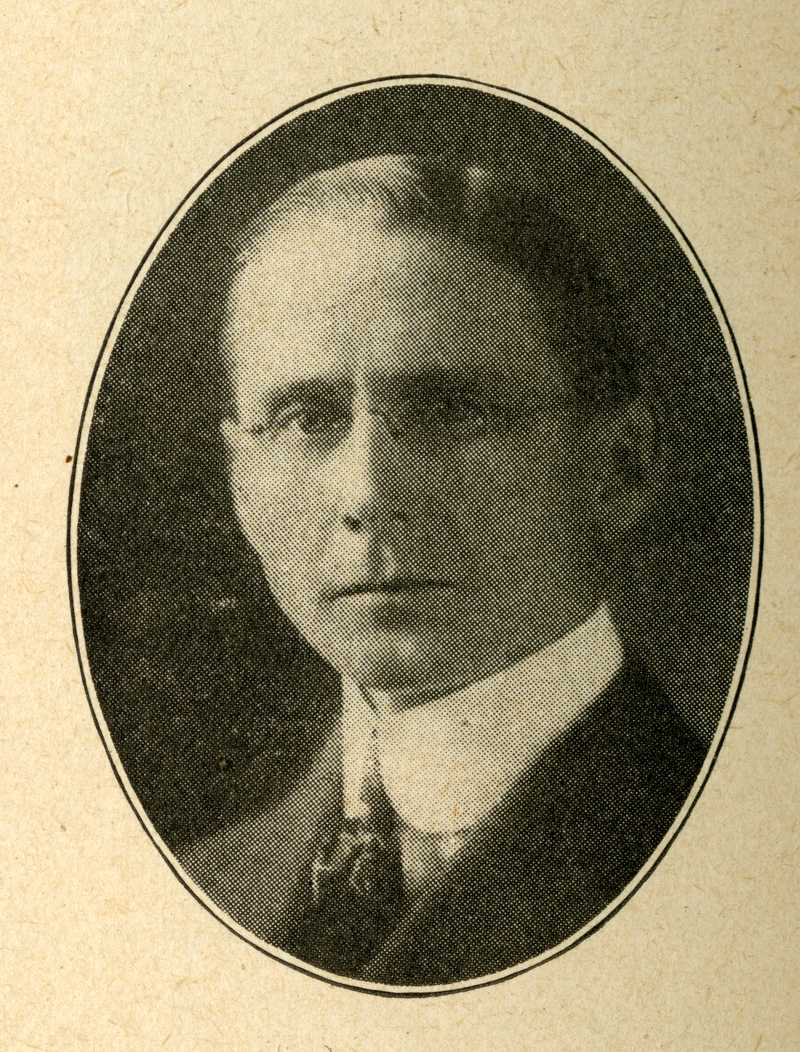
Gooding in 1919

Arthur C. Gooding (June 20, 1871 – August 9, 1971) was an American businessman and politician.

Born in Rochester, Minnesota, Gooding graduated from Rochester High School. He was in the banking business. During World War I, Gooding was the food and fuel administrators. He also served on the Minnesota War Council for Olmsted County, Minnesota. Gooding served on the Rochester Library board. he also served on the Rochester School Board. From 1916 to 1917, Gooding served as the Minnesota State Treasurer and was a Republican. From 1919 to 1922, Gooding served in the Minnesota State Senate. Gooding died in a hospital in Rochester, Minnesota.

== Notes ==
Political offices
Preceded by Walter J. Smith	Treasurer of Minnesota; 1916–1917	Succeeded by Henry Rines
