= Carol C. Johnson =

Minnesota State Treasurer
- In office January 4, 1999 – January 6, 2003
- Preceded by: Michael McGrath
- Succeeded by: Position Abolished

At-Large member of the Bloomington City Council
- In office 1990–1993
- Preceded by: Roger Blessum
- Succeeded by: Coral Houle

Personal details
- Born: January 28, 1941 (age 85) Lakefield, Minnesota
- Party: Democratic (DFL)

Carol Catherine Johnson (née Krogh) (born January 28, 1941) is a politician in the Minnesota Democratic-Farmer-Labor Party. She was the last person and the only woman to serve as Minnesota State Treasurer before the office was abolished in 2003.

Johnson was born in Lakefield, Minnesota in 1941. She moved to Bloomington, Minnesota later in life. From 1990 to 1993, she served as an at-large city councilmember for the city. She later became the Chief aide for Minnesota State Treasurer Michael A. McGrath, who she would succeed as Treasurer in 1999.

In 2002, Johnson ran unsuccessfully for Minnesota State Auditor. She lost to Patricia Anderson. She currently resides in Inver Grove Heights.

Party political offices
Preceded by Michael McGrath	DFL nominee for Minnesota State Treasurer; 1998	Succeeded by None
Preceded by Nancy A. Larson	DFL nominee for Minnesota State Auditor; 2002	Succeeded by Rebecca Otto
Political offices
Preceded by Michael A. McGrath	State Treasurer of Minnesota; 1999 – 2003	Succeeded by Office Abolished
