= Minnesota State Treasurer =

Constitutional officer of Minnesota, United States

The state treasurer of Minnesota was a constitutional officer in the executive branch of the U.S. state of Minnesota. Twenty-six individuals occupied the office of state treasurer from 1858 until the office's abolition in 2003. The final state treasurer was Carol C. Johnson, a DFLer.

== Election and term of office ==
The state treasurer was elected by the people on Election Day in November, and took office on the first Monday of the next January. There was no limit to the number of terms a state treasurer may hold. To be elected state treasurer, a person must have been a qualified voter, permanently resident in the state of Minnesota at least 30 days prior to the election, and at least 21 years of age.

In the event of a vacancy in the office of the state treasurer, the governor was empowered to appoint a successor to serve the balance of the term. The state treasurer could also be recalled by the voters or removed from office through an impeachment trial.

Beginning with the 1962 election, the term of the office increased from two to four years.

== Powers and duties ==
Throughout the office's existence, the state treasurer served as the banker of state government. This function entailed managing and accounting for the state's cash flows, coordinating banking services for state agencies, collecting receipts, issuing payments, reconciling state bank accounts, and servicing the state debt. Prior to 1983, the state treasurer also administered unclaimed property.

== History ==
The 1998 Minnesota Amendment 2 abolished the position of state treasurer, effective January 6, 2003. The functions of the office were transferred to the commissioner of finance, who is appointed by the governor and confirmed by the Minnesota Senate. The position of commissioner of finance became commissioner of Minnesota Management and Budget in 2009.

== List of territorial and state treasurers ==
=== Territorial treasurers ===
Name	Took office	Left office	Party
Calvin A. Tuttle	1849	1853	Whig
George W. Prescott	1853	1854	Democratic
Charles E. Leonard	1854	1857	Democratic
George W. Armstrong	1857	1858	Democratic

=== State treasurers ===
No.	Image	Name	Term	Party
1		George W. Armstrong	May 24, 1858 - January 1, 1860	Democratic
2		Charles Scheffer	January 1, 1860 - January 10, 1868	Republican
3		Emil D. Munch	January 10, 1868 - January 5, 1872	Republican
4		William Seeger	January 5, 1872 - February 7, 1873	Republican
5		Edwin W. Dyke	February 7, 1873 - January 7, 1876	Republican
5		Edwin W. Dyke	February 7, 1873 - January 7, 1876	Anti-Monopoly
6		William Pfaender	January 7, 1876 - January 10, 1880	Republican
7		Charles Kittelson	January 10, 1880 - January 5, 1887	Republican
8		Joseph Bobleter	January 5, 1887 - January 7, 1895	Republican
9		August T. Koerner	January 7, 1895 - January 7, 1901	Republican
10		Julius H. Block	January 7, 1901 - January 7, 1907	Republican
11		Clarence C. Dinehart	January 7, 1907 - June 8, 1910	Republican
12		Elias Steele Pettijohn	June 8, 1910 - January 3, 1911	Republican
13		Walter J. Smith	January 3, 1911 - February 14, 1916	Republican
14		Arthur C. Gooding	February 14, 1916 - January 2, 1917	Republican
15		Henry Rines	January 2, 1917 - July 1, 1925	Republican
16		Edward W. Stark	July 1, 1925 - January 4, 1927	Republican
17		Julius A. Schmahl	January 4, 1927 - January 5, 1937	Republican
18		C. A. Halverson	January 5, 1937 - January 2, 1939	Farmer–Labor
19		Julius A. Schmahl	January 2, 1939 - January 2, 1951	Republican
20		Val Bjornson	January 2, 1951 - January 3, 1955	Republican
21		Arthur Hansen	January 3, 1955 - January 7, 1957	DFL
22		Val Bjornson	January 7, 1957 - January 6, 1975	Republican
23		Jim Lord	January 6, 1975 - January 3, 1983	DFL
24		Robert W. Mattson Jr.	January 3, 1983 - January 5, 1987	DFL
25		Michael McGrath	January 5, 1987 - January 4, 1999	DFL
26		Carol C. Johnson	January 4, 1999 - January 6, 2003	DFL

=== Notes on Minnesota political party names ===
- Minnesota Democratic-Farmer-Labor Party: On April 15, 1944 the state Democratic Party and the Minnesota Farmer-Labor Party merged and created the Minnesota Democratic-Farmer-Labor Party (DFL). It is affiliated with the national Democratic Party.
- Republican Party of Minnesota: From November 15, 1975 to September 23, 1995 the name of the state Republican party was the Independent-Republican party (I-R). The party has always been affiliated with the national Republican Party.
