= Minnesota's 14th Senate district =

American legislative district

Minnesota's 14th State Senate district
Senator
Aric Putnam –St. Cloud

The Minnesota Senate, District 14 is one of 67 Minnesota State Senate districts. It encompasses parts of Benton County, Sherburne County, and Stearns County. The seat has been held by DFLer Aric Putnam of St. Cloud, Minnesota since 2021.

== List of senators ==
List of Minnesota State senators from District 14
Session	Image	Senator	Party	Term start	Term end	Residence	Counties represented	Ref.
1st		George Watson	Republican	December 2, 1857	January 7, 1861	Sumner	Faribault and Freeborn counties.	
2nd		George Watson	Republican	December 2, 1857	January 7, 1861	Sumner	Faribault and Freeborn counties.	
3rd		Henry Whitcomb Holley	Republican	January 8, 1861	January 6, 1862	Chatfield	Fillmore County.	
4th		Luke Miller	Republican	January 7, 1862	January 4, 1869	Chatfield	Faribault, Fillmore, Freeborn counties.	
5th		Luke Miller	Republican	January 7, 1862	January 4, 1869	Chatfield	Fillmore county	
6th		Luke Miller	Republican	January 7, 1862	January 4, 1869	Chatfield	Fillmore county	
7th		Luke Miller	Republican	January 7, 1862	January 4, 1869	Chatfield	Fillmore county	
8th		Luke Miller	Republican	January 7, 1862	January 4, 1869	Chatfield	Fillmore county	
9th		Luke Miller	Republican	January 7, 1862	January 4, 1869	Chatfield	Fillmore county	
10th		Luke Miller	Republican	January 7, 1862	January 4, 1869	Rushford	Fillmore county	
11th		A. Bergen	Republican	January 5, 1869	January 1, 1870	Rushford	Fillmore county	
12th		Benjamin D. Sprague	N/A	January 1, 1870	January 2, 1871	Rushford	Fillmore county	
13th		John Q. Farmer	Republican	January 3, 1871	January 1, 1872	Spring Valley	Fillmore county	
14th		Amos Coggswell	Democratic	January 2, 1872	January 5, 1874	Mankato	Blue Earth county.	
15th		Amos Coggswell	Democratic	January 2, 1872	January 5, 1874	Mankato	Blue Earth county.	
16th		Morton S. Wilkinson	Democratic	January 6, 1874	January 7, 1878	Mankato	Blue Earth county.	
17th		Morton S. Wilkinson	Democratic	January 6, 1874	January 7, 1878	Mankato	Blue Earth county.	
18th		Morton S. Wilkinson	Democratic	January 6, 1874	January 7, 1878	Mankato	Blue Earth county.	
19th		Morton S. Wilkinson	Democratic	January 6, 1874	January 7, 1878	Mankato	Blue Earth county.	
20th		Franklin H. Waite	Democratic	January 8, 1878	January 6, 1879	Mankato	Blue Earth county.	
21st		Daniel Buck	Democratic	January 7, 1879	January 1, 1883	Mankato	Blue Earth county.	
22nd		Daniel Buck	Democratic	January 7, 1879	January 1, 1883	Mankato	Blue Earth county.	
23rd		Daniel A. Morrison	Republican	January 2, 1883	January 3, 1887	Rochester	Olmsted county.	
24th		Daniel A. Morrison	Republican	January 2, 1883	January 3, 1887	Rochester	Olmsted county.	
25th		Milton J. Daniels	Republican	January 4, 1887	January 5, 1891	Rochester	Olmsted county.	
26th		Milton J. Daniels	Republican	January 4, 1887	January 5, 1891	Rochester	Olmsted county.	
27th		William Worrall Mayo	Democratic	January 6, 1891	January 7, 1895	Rochester	Olmsted county.	
28th		William Worrall Mayo	Democratic	January 6, 1891	January 7, 1895	Rochester	Olmsted county.	
29th		Alonzo Thomas Stebbins	Republican	January 8, 1895	January 2, 1899	Rochester	Olmsted county.	
30th		Alonzo Thomas Stebbins	Republican	January 8, 1895	January 2, 1899	Rochester	Olmsted county.	
31st		Emil Julius Meilicke	Populist	January 3, 1899	January 5, 1903	Windom	Cottonwood and Jackson county.	
32nd		Emil Julius Meilicke	Populist	January 3, 1899	January 5, 1903	Windom	Cottonwood and Jackson county.	
33rd		W. A. Smith	Republican	January 6, 1903	January 6, 1907	Windom	Cottonwood and Jackson county.	
34th		W. A. Smith	Republican	January 6, 1903	January 6, 1907	Windom	Cottonwood and Jackson county.	
35th		Henry E. Hanson	Republican	January 7, 1907	January 2, 1911	Windom	Cottonwood and Jackson county.	
36th		Henry E. Hanson	Republican	January 7, 1907	January 2, 1911	Windom	Cottonwood and Jackson county.	
37th		Andrew C. Olson	Republican	January 3, 1911	January 4, 1915	Windom	Cottonwood and Jackson county.	
38th		Andrew C. Olson	Republican	January 3, 1911	January 4, 1915	Windom	Cottonwood and Jackson county.	
39th		LaForest E. Potter	Nonpartisan	January 5, 1915	January 6, 1919	Springfield	Brown and Redwood counties.	
40th		LaForest E. Potter	Nonpartisan	January 5, 1915	January 6, 1919	Springfield	Brown and Redwood counties.	
41st		Frank F. Romberg	Nonpartisan Liberal Caucus	January 7, 1919	January 2, 1939	Sleepy Eye	Brown and Redwood counties.	
42nd		Frank F. Romberg	Nonpartisan Liberal Caucus	January 7, 1919	January 2, 1939	Sleepy Eye	Brown and Redwood counties.	
43rd		Frank F. Romberg	Nonpartisan Liberal Caucus	January 7, 1919	January 2, 1939	Sleepy Eye	Brown and Redwood counties.	
44th		Frank F. Romberg	Nonpartisan Liberal Caucus	January 7, 1919	January 2, 1939	Sleepy Eye	Brown and Redwood counties.	
45th		Frank F. Romberg	Nonpartisan Liberal Caucus	January 7, 1919	January 2, 1939	Sleepy Eye	Brown and Redwood counties.	
46th		Frank F. Romberg	Nonpartisan Liberal Caucus	January 7, 1919	January 2, 1939	Sleepy Eye	Brown and Redwood counties.	
47th		Frank F. Romberg	Nonpartisan Liberal Caucus	January 7, 1919	January 2, 1939	Sleepy Eye	Brown and Redwood counties.	
48th		Frank F. Romberg	Nonpartisan Liberal Caucus	January 7, 1919	January 2, 1939	Sleepy Eye	Brown and Redwood counties.	
49th		Frank F. Romberg	Nonpartisan Liberal Caucus	January 7, 1919	January 2, 1939	Sleepy Eye	Brown and Redwood counties.	
50th		Frank F. Romberg	Nonpartisan Liberal Caucus	January 7, 1919	January 2, 1939	Sleepy Eye	Brown and Redwood counties.	
51st		Alexander Seifert	Nonpartisan	January 3, 1939	January 6, 1947	Springfield	Brown and Redwood counties.	
52nd		Alexander Seifert	Nonpartisan	January 3, 1939	January 6, 1947	Springfield	Brown and Redwood counties.	
53rd		Alexander Seifert	Nonpartisan	January 3, 1939	January 6, 1947	Springfield	Brown and Redwood counties.	
54th		Alexander Seifert	Nonpartisan	January 3, 1939	January 6, 1947	Springfield	Brown and Redwood counties.	
55th		John Matthew Zwach Sr.	Nonpartisan Conservative Caucus	January 7, 1947	January 7, 1963	Walnut Grove	Brown and Redwood counties.	
56th		John Matthew Zwach Sr.	Nonpartisan Conservative Caucus	January 7, 1947	January 7, 1963	Walnut Grove	Brown and Redwood counties.	
57th		John Matthew Zwach Sr.	Nonpartisan Conservative Caucus	January 7, 1947	January 7, 1963	Walnut Grove	Brown and Redwood counties.	
58th		John Matthew Zwach Sr.	Nonpartisan Conservative Caucus	January 7, 1947	January 7, 1963	Walnut Grove	Brown and Redwood counties.	
59th		John Matthew Zwach Sr.	Nonpartisan Conservative Caucus	January 7, 1947	January 7, 1963	Walnut Grove	Brown and Redwood counties.	
60th		John Matthew Zwach Sr.	Nonpartisan Conservative Caucus	January 7, 1947	January 7, 1963	Walnut Grove	Brown and Redwood counties.	
61st		John Matthew Zwach Sr.	Nonpartisan Conservative Caucus	January 7, 1947	January 7, 1963	Walnut Grove	Brown and Redwood counties.	
62nd		John Matthew Zwach Sr.	Nonpartisan Conservative Caucus	January 7, 1947	January 7, 1963	Walnut Grove	Brown and Redwood counties.	
63rd		Harold Popp	Nonpartisan Conservative Caucus	January 8, 1963	January 2, 1967	Hutchinson	Carver and McLeod counties.	
64th		Harold Popp	Nonpartisan Conservative Caucus	January 8, 1963	January 2, 1967	Hutchinson	Carver and McLeod counties.	
65th		John A. Metcalf	Nonpartisan Conservative Caucus	January 3, 1967	January 1, 1973	Shakopee	Carver, Le Sueur and Scott counties.	
66th		John A. Metcalf	Nonpartisan Conservative Caucus	January 3, 1967	January 1, 1973	Shakopee	Carver, Le Sueur and Scott counties.	
67th		John A. Metcalf	Nonpartisan Conservative Caucus	January 3, 1967	January 1, 1973	Shakopee	Carver, Le Sueur and Scott counties.	
68th		Florian Chmielewski	Nonpartisan Liberal Caucus	January 2, 1973	January 4, 1993	Sturgeon Lake	Carlton, Chisago, Pine, St. Louis counties.	
69th		Florian Chmielewski	Nonpartisan Liberal Caucus	January 2, 1973	January 4, 1993	Sturgeon Lake	Carlton, Chisago, Pine, St. Louis counties.	
70th		Florian Chmielewski	Democratic-Farmer-Labor	January 2, 1973	January 4, 1993	Sturgeon Lake	Carlton, Chisago, Pine, St. Louis counties.	
71st		Florian Chmielewski	Democratic-Farmer-Labor	January 2, 1973	January 4, 1993	Sturgeon Lake	Carlton, Chisago, Pine, St. Louis counties.	
72nd		Florian Chmielewski	Democratic-Farmer-Labor	January 2, 1973	January 4, 1993	Sturgeon Lake	Carlton, Chisago, Pine, St. Louis counties.	
73rd		Florian Chmielewski	Democratic-Farmer-Labor	January 2, 1973	January 4, 1993	Sturgeon Lake	Aitkin, Carlton, Kanabec, Pine counties.	
74th		Florian Chmielewski	Democratic-Farmer-Labor	January 2, 1973	January 4, 1993	Sturgeon Lake	Aitkin, Carlton, Kanabec, Pine counties.	
75th		Florian Chmielewski	Democratic-Farmer-Labor	January 2, 1973	January 4, 1993	Sturgeon Lake	Aitkin, Carlton, Kanabec, Pine counties.	
76th		Florian Chmielewski	Democratic-Farmer-Labor	January 2, 1973	January 4, 1993	Sturgeon Lake	Aitkin, Carlton, Kanabec, Pine counties.	
77th		Florian Chmielewski	Democratic-Farmer-Labor	January 2, 1973	January 4, 1993	Sturgeon Lake	Aitkin, Carlton, Kanabec, Pine counties.	
78th		Joe Bertram	Democratic-Farmer-Labor	January 5, 1993	January 9, 1996	Paynesville	Benton, Morrison, Pope and Stearns counties.	
79th		Joe Bertram	Democratic-Farmer-Labor	January 5, 1993	January 9, 1996	Paynesville	Benton, Morrison, Pope and Stearns counties.	
79th		Vacant (Note: Joe Bertram resigned after having pled guilty to shoplifting a leather vest and trying to bribe the store owner into not reporting it.)		January 9, 1996	February 12, 1996	Paynesville	Benton, Morrison, Pope and Stearns counties.	
80th		Michelle Fischbach	Republican	February 12, 1996	January 7, 2013	Paynesville	Benton, Morrison, Pope and Stearns counties.	
81st		Michelle Fischbach	Republican	February 12, 1996	January 7, 2013	Paynesville	Benton, Morrison, Pope and Stearns counties.	
82nd		Michelle Fischbach	Republican	February 12, 1996	January 7, 2013	Paynesville	Benton, Morrison, Pope and Stearns counties.	
83rd		Michelle Fischbach	Republican	February 12, 1996	January 7, 2013	Paynesville	Benton and Stearns counties.	
84th		Michelle Fischbach	Republican	February 12, 1996	January 7, 2013	Paynesville	Benton and Stearns counties.	
85th		Michelle Fischbach	Republican	February 12, 1996	January 7, 2013	Paynesville	Benton and Stearns counties.	
86th		Michelle Fischbach	Republican	February 12, 1996	January 7, 2013	Paynesville	Benton and Stearns counties.	
87th		Michelle Fischbach	Republican	February 12, 1996	January 7, 2013	Paynesville	Benton and Stearns counties.	
88th		John C. Pederson	Republican	January 8, 2013	January 2, 2017	Saint Cloud	Benton, Sherburne and Stearns counties.	
89th		John C. Pederson	Republican	January 8, 2013	January 2, 2017	Saint Cloud	Benton, Sherburne and Stearns counties.	
90th		Jerry Relph	Republican	January 3, 2017	December 18, 2020	Saint Cloud	Benton, Sherburne and Stearns counties.	
91st		Jerry Relph	Republican	January 3, 2017	December 18, 2020	Saint Cloud	Benton, Sherburne and Stearns counties.	
91st		Vacant (Note: Jerry Relph died from COVID-19 after having lost his 2020 re-election bid to Aric Putnam.)		December 18, 2020	January 5, 2021	Saint Cloud	Benton, Sherburne and Stearns counties.	
92nd		Aric Putnam	Democratic-Farmer-Labor	January 5, 2021	Incumbent	Saint Cloud	Benton, Sherburne and Stearns counties.	
93rd		Aric Putnam	Democratic-Farmer-Labor	January 5, 2021	Incumbent	Saint Cloud	Benton, Sherburne and Stearns counties.	
94th		Aric Putnam	Democratic-Farmer-Labor	January 5, 2021	Incumbent	Saint Cloud	Benton, Sherburne and Stearns counties.	
