= Minor T. Thomas =

Minnesota Brigadier General, civil engineer, and surveyor

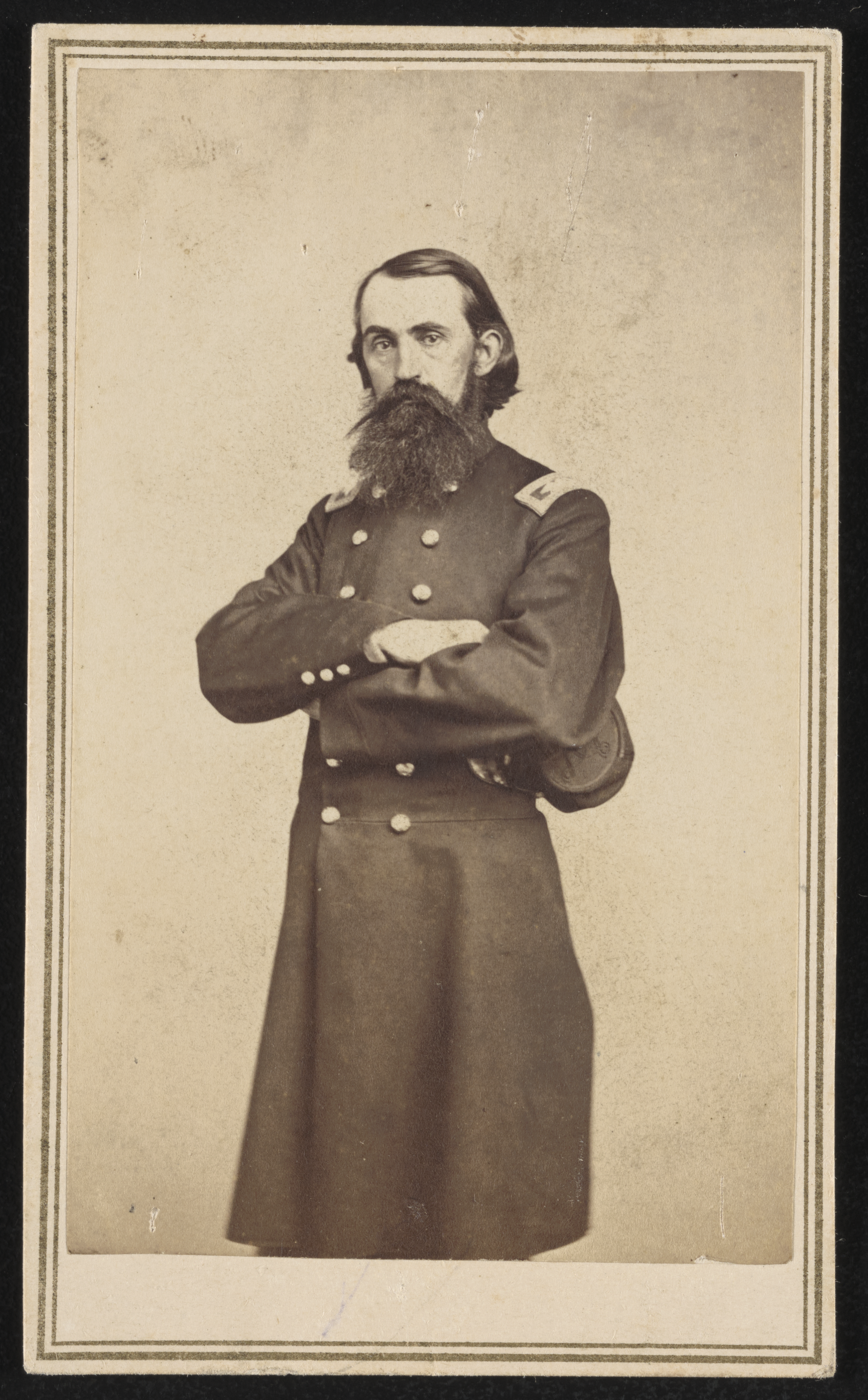
- Thomas c. 1865 by Joel Emmons Whitney

County Surveyor of Washington County, Minnesota
- In office 1860–1861

Personal details
- Born: September 24, 1830 Connersville, Indiana
- Died: October 2, 1897 (aged 67) Minneapolis, Minnesota
- Resting place: Galveston Cemetery, Galveston, Indiana
- Parent: Hewitt L. Thomas (father)
- Profession: Surveyor; Civil Engineer

Military service
- Allegiance: United States of America
- Branch/service: Union Army
- Years of service: 1861–1865
- Rank: Colonel; Brevet Brigadier General
- Unit: 1st Minnesota Infantry Regiment; 4th Minnesota Infantry Regiment
- Commands: 8th Minnesota Infantry Regiment; 3rd District, Department of the Northwest; 3rd Brigade, 1st Division, XXIII Corps
- Battles/wars: American Civil War: Bull Run campaign; First Battle of Bull Run; Shiloh Campaign; Siege of Corinth; Sully's Expedition (1863-1864); Battle of Killdeer Mountain; Battle of the Badlands; Franklin–Nashville Campaign; Third Battle of Murfreesboro; Carolinas campaign; Battle of Wyse Fork

Minor T. Thomas (September 24, 1830 – October 2, 1897) was a Minnesota surveyor, civil engineer, and military officer who served during the American Civil War and the American Indian Wars. Thomas was responsible for surveying various portions of Washington County, Minnesota, from 1857 to 1861. During his service in the Union Army Thomas began as a Second Lieutenant in the 1st Minnesota Infantry Regiment, by the end of the war Thomas held the rank of Brigadier General and commanded the 3rd Brigade of the 1st Division of the XXIII Corps under Major General Thomas H. Ruger.

== Early life and family ==
Minor T. Thomas was born on September 24, 1830, in Connersville, Indiana; he was the son of judge Hewitt L. Thomas and Charlotte Corday Helm. Thomas first moved to Minnesota in 1854 in order to recover from malaria. Thomas later encouraged his family to move to Minnesota in 1855. Thomas's father Hewitt was a member of the Minnesota Legislature and served in both the Minnesota Senate and later the Minnesota House of Representatives. According to the Minnesota Legislative Reference Library, Hewitt served in the 1st Minnesota Legislature, the 3rd Minnesota Legislature, and the 4th Minnesota Legislature from 1857 to 1862 representing Chisago County, Kanabec County, Pine County, and Washington County.

Thomas was engaged in work as a surveyor in Washington County, Minnesota, from 1857 to 1861. During his time in Minnesota Thomas, his brothers, and his father helped plot the village of Afton, Minnesota, where they owned and operated a gristmill. Thomas held the office of County Surveyor of Washington County shortly before the American Civil War from 1860 to 1861.

== American Civil War ==
=== 1st Minnesota Infantry Regiment ===
At the outbreak of the American Civil War Thomas volunteered for service in the Union Army. Thomas was mustered into the ranks the 1st Minnesota Infantry Regiment on April 29, 1861. Thomas served as the Second Lieutenant of Company B nicknamed the "Stillwater Guards" of the 1st Minnesota under the command of Captain Carlyle A. Bromley. The Stillwater Guards were a militia from Stillwater and Washington County which had its origins in the pre-war era. Thomas was wounded at the First Battle of Bull Run, the 1st Minnesota's baptism by fire. Thomas and other wounded men from the 1st Minnesota are listed in a newspaper article from the St. Cloud Democrat from August 1, 1861. Thomas would serve with the 1st Minnesota until October 18, 1861, when he was promoted to the rank of Lieutenant Colonel of the 4th Minnesota Infantry Regiment.

=== 4th Minnesota Infantry Regiment ===
Thomas was mustered into the 4th Minnesota Infantry Regiment on November 2, 1861, as the regiment's Lieutenant Colonel. The 4th Minnesota fought exclusively in the Western theater of the American Civil War. As the regiment's second-in-command Thomas fought with the regiment at the Siege of Corinth. Thomas's service with the 4th Minnesota was short as he was quickly promoted to the rank of Colonel on August 24, 1862, and given command of the newly mustered 8th Minnesota Infantry Regiment.

=== 8th Minnesota Infantry Regiment ===
The 8th Minnesota had been raised by the Governor of Minnesota Alexander Ramsey in response to the Dakota War of 1862, the regiment was raised in order to take part in a punitive campaign against the Dakota people under General Alfred Sully. The 8th Minnesota Infantry Regiment was mustered into Federal service at Fort Snelling from June 2 to September 1, 1862. From November 17, 1862, until November 23, 1862, Thomas briefly commanded the 3rd District of the Department of the Northwest headquartered at Fort Ripley under the command of Major General John Pope. From August 1862 until November 1864 the regiment was posted at various forts across Minnesota on frontier duty.

The 8th Minnesota would take part in Sully's Expedition during the summer of 1864 where it would fight at the Battle of Killdeer Mountain and the Battle of the Badlands. During Sully's Expedition in 1864 Thomas would command the "Minnesota Brigade", a brigade made up of entirely Minnesota volunteers from the 2nd Minnesota Cavalry Regiment, the 3rd Minnesota Light Artillery Battery, and the 8th Minnesota Infantry Regiment (mounted on horseback).

=== Brigade Commander ===
The 8th Minnesota would later be re-routed to fight in the Western theater of the American Civil War in the Franklin–Nashville campaign at the Third Battle of Murfreesboro where it would suffer a loss of 13 men killed and 77 wounded in just thirty minutes. Near the end of the war Thomas commanded the 3rd Brigade of the 1st Division of the XXIII Corps under General Thomas H. Ruger which consisted of troops from the 8th Minnesota, the 25th Massachusetts Infantry Regiment, the 174th Ohio Infantry Regiment, and the 178th Ohio Infantry Regiment. Thomas would lead the 8th Minnesota and the 3rd Brigade of the XIII Corps at the Battle of Wyse Fork. Thomas mustered out of service with the rest of the 8th Minnesota on July 11, 1865.

== Postwar and death ==
Following the war Thomas worked as a civil engineer for the Saint Paul and Pacific Railroad, later part of the Great Northern Railway. According to his obituary Thomas also worked as an engineer in Detroit, New Orleans, Texas, and California. Thomas was married to Caroline "Carrie" B. Bolton in 1855. Together they had one daughter, Minnesota "Minnie" B. Thomas. Thomas died on October 2, 1897, in Minneapolis. He is buried in the Galveston Cemetery in Galveston, Indiana.

== See also ==
- List of American Civil War brevet generals
