= Albert Scheffer =

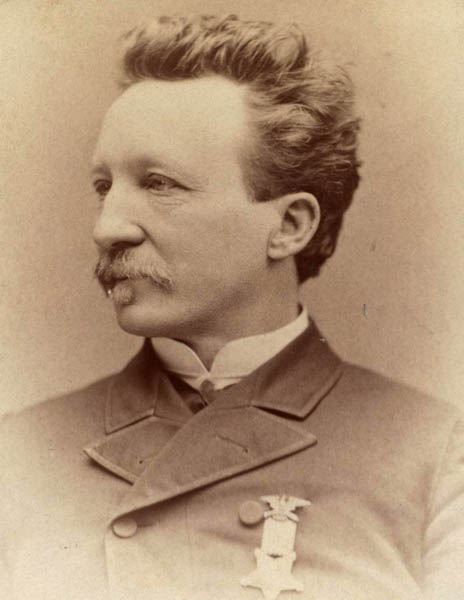
- Scheffer c.1885

Member of the Minnesota Senate
- In office January 3, 1887 – January 4, 1891
- Governor: Andrew Ryan McGill; William Rush Merriam

Personal details
- Born: March 27, 1844 Rheinberg, Kingdom of Prussia
- Died: September 29, 1905 (aged 61) Saint Paul, Minnesota, U.S.
- Resting place: Oakland Cemetery; Saint Paul, Minnesota, U.S.
- Other political affiliations: Republican
- Relations: Charles Scheffer (brother)
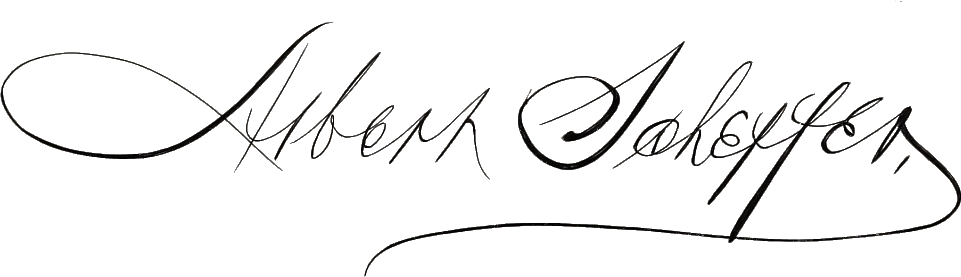
- Signature

Military service
- Allegiance: United States of America
- Branch/service: Union Army
- Years of service: 1864–1865
- Rank: First Lieutenant
- Unit: Company A, 39th Wisconsin Infantry Regiment; Company C, 35th Wisconsin Infantry Regiment; Company C, 45th Wisconsin Infantry Regiment
- Battles/wars: American Civil War

Albert Scheffer (March 27, 1844 – September 29, 1905) was an American politician from the state of Minnesota. He was the younger brother of Minnesota State Treasurer Charles Scheffer.

== Early life ==
Scheffer was born in Rheinberg on March 27, 1844. He emigrated to the United States in 1849, and became a banker in St. Paul, Minnesota in 1860.

== Military service ==
On May 16, 1864 Scheffer volunteered for service in the Union Army during the American Civil War and was enrolled into the ranks of Company A of the 39th Wisconsin Infantry Regiment, a regiment made of Hundred Days Men that fought in the Second Battle of Memphis. Scheffer mustered out of service on September 22, 1864. On October 11, 1864 Scheffer re-enlisted into the Union Army and was enrolled into Company C of the 35th Wisconsin Infantry Regiment as a Private. Scheffer was quickly promoted to the rank of Lieutenant on December 30, 1864 and was transferred to assist in commanding Company C of the 45th Wisconsin Infantry Regiment. Scheffer mustered out of service on July 17, 1865.

== Politics ==
In 1872, he ran as a Democrat for Minnesota State Auditor, losing to Orlan P. Whitcomb. In 1886, now as a Republican, Scheffer ran for governor of Minnesota. During the Republican primary, he was one of five candidates. After one had dropped out, two others attempted to consolidate their votes behind Scheffer to defeat frontrunner Andrew Ryan McGill, however rouge delegate refusing to switch their votes resulted in Scheffer losing the nomination to McGill. That year, he was first elected to the Minnesota Senate. He left office in 1891.

Scheffer Elementary School in St. Paul is named after him.
