= 1872 Minnesota State Auditor election =

- November 5, 1872

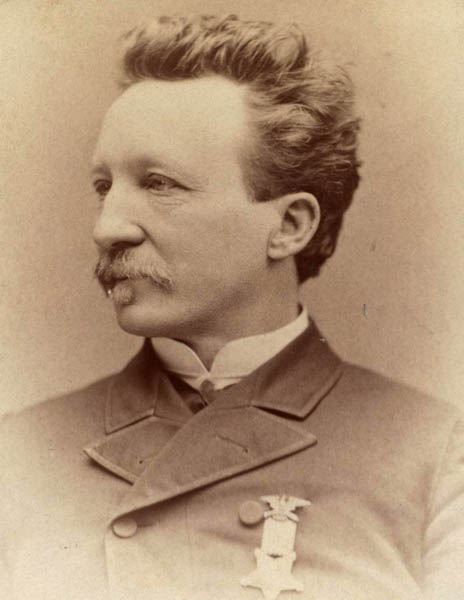
Nominee	Orlan P. Whitcomb	Albert Scheffer
Party	Republican	Democratic
Popular vote	51,190	34,817
Percentage	59.52%	40.48%
State Auditor before election
Charles McIlrath
Republican
Elected State Auditor
Orlan P. Whitcomb
Republican

The 1872 Minnesota State Auditor election was held on November 5, 1872, in order to elect the state auditor of Minnesota. Republican nominee Orlan P. Whitcomb defeated Democratic nominee Albert Scheffer.

== General election ==
On election day, November 5, 1872, Republican nominee Orlan P. Whitcomb won the election by a margin of 16,373 votes against his opponent Democratic nominee Albert Scheffer, thereby retaining Republican control over the office of state auditor. Whitcomb was sworn in as the 3rd state auditor of Minnesota on January 9, 1873.

=== Results ===
Minnesota State Auditor election, 1872
Party	Candidate	Votes	%
Republican	Orlan P. Whitcomb	51,190	59.52
Democratic	Albert Scheffer	34,817	40.48
Total votes		86,007	100.00
Republican hold			
