= John Pell =

John Pell may refer to:

- John Pell (mathematician) (1611–1685), English mathematician and political agent
- Sir John Pell (landowner) (1643–1712), his son, British-born American landowner
- John H. Pell (1831-1902), member of the Minnesota State Senate
