= Oakwood Township =

Oakwood Township may refer to the following townships in the United States:

- Oakwood Township, Vermilion County, Illinois
- Oakwood Township, Wabasha County, Minnesota
