= 1881 Minnesota State Auditor election =

- November 8, 1881
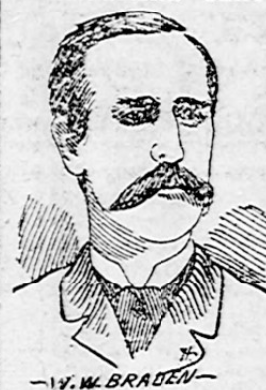

Nominee	William W. Braden	Rudolph Lehmicke
Party	Republican	Democratic
Popular vote	65,964	36,501
Percentage	62.36%	34.51%
State Auditor before election
Orlan P. Whitcomb
Republican
Elected State Auditor
William W. Braden
Republican

The 1881 Minnesota State Auditor election was held on November 8, 1881, in order to elect the state auditor of Minnesota. Republican nominee and former member of the Minnesota House of Representatives William W. Braden defeated Democratic nominee Rudolph Lehmicke, Greenback nominee Ebenezer Ayres and Prohibition nominee G.A. Armstrong.

== General election ==
On election day, November 8, 1881, Republican nominee William W. Braden won the election by a margin of 29,463 votes against his foremost opponent Democratic nominee Rudolph Lehmicke, thereby retaining Republican control over the office of state auditor. Braden was sworn in as the 4th state auditor of Minnesota on January 10, 1882.

=== Results ===
Minnesota State Auditor election, 1881
Party	Candidate	Votes	%
Republican	William W. Braden	65,964	62.36
Democratic	Rudolph Lehmicke	36,501	34.51
Greenback	Ebenezer Ayres	2,547	2.41
Prohibition	G.A. Armstrong	769	0.72
Total votes		105,781	100.00
Republican hold			
