= George Watson (Minnesota politician) =

American physician and politician

- Watson c. 1858

Member of the Minnesota Senate from the 14th District
- In office December 2, 1857 – January 6, 1862
- Governor: Samuel Medary; Henry Hastings Sibley; Alexander Ramsey
- Preceded by: Position established
- Succeeded by: Henry Whitcomb Holley

Chief Clerk of the Surveyor General of Minnesota
- In office July 1, 1865 – 1874

Personal details
- Born: 1821 Ashtabula County, Ohio, U.S.
- Died: January 2, 1888 (aged 66–67) Saint Paul, Minnesota, U.S.
- Resting place: Oakland Cemetery; Saint Paul, Minnesota, U.S.
- Other political affiliations: Republican

George Watson (1821 – January 2, 1888) was an American medical dictor, politician, surveyor, and early citizen of Freeborn County, Minnesota who served three consecutive terms in the Minnesota Senate from 1857 to 1862.

== Early life ==
Watson was born in 1821 in Ashtabula County, Ohio. Watson was the son of Heman Watson and Sarah "Sally" Watson (née Henderson). Watson moved from Pennsylvania to Minnesota Territory in 1856, choosing to settle in the village of Sumner, Minnesota in the newly established Freeborn County.^{:413}

== Political career ==
Watson was elected as the justice of the peace for Freeborn County, Minnesota on March 3, 1857, Watson also served as the county coroner.^{:97} Watson was later appointed as the postmaster of Trenton Township in Freeborn County on September 26, 1857.^{:228, 256}

Watson was a member of the Republican Party of Minnesota and was elected as a member of the 1857 Republican Constitutional Convention which ratified the Minnesota Constitution.

Watson was first elected to the Minnesota Senate on October 13, 1857, as a Republican. Watson represented Minnesota's 14th Senate district which included Freeborn County, Faribault County, Steele County, and Waseca County. During his firs term Watson was a member of the Elections and Incorporations committees.

Watson was subsequently elected for two more consecutive terms in the Minnesota Senate and served in both the 2nd Minnesota Legislature and 3rd Minnesota Legislature from December 7, 1859, to January 6, 1862. During his second and third terms Watson was a member of the State Library, Public Lands, and Agriculture and Manufactures committees. Watson was also the chair of the Towns and Counties and Agriculture and Manufactures committees.

== Later life and death ==
Following his political career in the Minnesota Senate, Watson was appointed as the chief clerk of the Surveyor General of Minnesota, William D. Washburn, on July 1, 1865.

Watson died on January 2, 1888, in Saint Paul, Minnesota he is buried in Oakland Cemetery.

== Personal life ==
Watson's son, Dwight Watson, lived in the Dwight and Clara Watson House in Saint Paul which was designed by Cass Gilbert in 1886.
