= William W. Braden =

American politician and farmer (1837–1897)

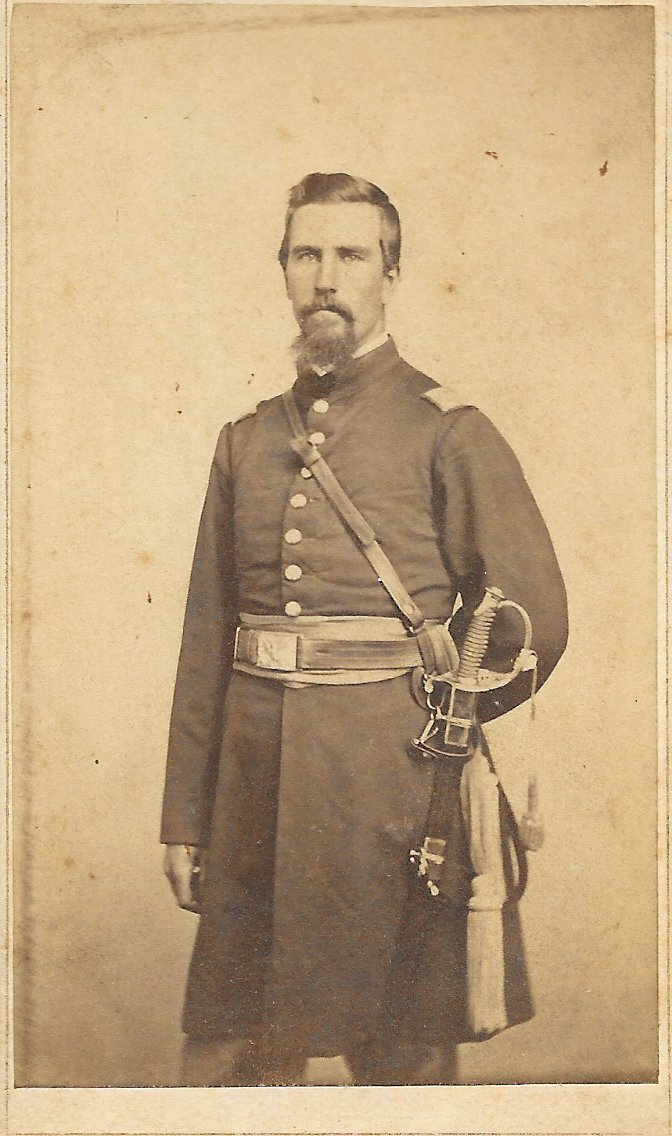
- Braden c. 1863 by Joel Emmons Whitney

4th Auditor of Minnesota
- In office January 10, 1882 – January 1891
- Governor: Lucius Frederick Hubbard; Andrew Ryan McGill; William Rush Merriam
- Preceded by: Orlan P. Whitcomb
- Succeeded by: Adolph Biermann

Member of the Minnesota House of Representatives from the 14th district
- In office January 8, 1867 – January 4, 1869

Personal details
- Born: December 3, 1837 Iberia, Ohio, U.S.
- Died: March 11, 1897 (aged 59) California, U.S.
- Party: Republican
- Occupation: Politician, farmer

Military service
- Allegiance: United States (Union)
- Branch/service: United States Army (Union army)
- Rank: Captain
- Unit: 6th Minnesota Infantry Regiment
- Commands: Company K (6th Minnesota Infantry Regiment)
- Battles/wars: American Civil War; American Indian Wars

William Wallace "W.W." Braden (December 3, 1837 – March 11, 1897) was an American politician and farmer who served as the fourth state auditor of Minnesota from 1882 to 1891 as a member of the Republican Party. He previously served in the Minnesota House of Representatives from 1867 to 1869, representing the 14th electoral district in the 9th and 10th sessions of the Minnesota Legislature. Braden was also an unsuccessful candidate for governor of Minnesota in 1890.

== Early life ==
Braden was born in Iberia, Ohio, on December 3, 1837. He came to Minnesota in 1854.

== Career ==
From 1862 to 1865, Braden served as a first lieutenant and later the captain of Company K in the 6th Minnesota Infantry Regiment during the American Civil War and the American Indian Wars. The 6th Minnesota fought in the Dakota War of 1862 at the Battle of Birch Coulee and the Battle of Wood Lake. The regiment later participated in Sibley's 1863 Campaign during the immediate aftermath of the Dakota War, taking part in the Battle of Big Mound, the Battle of Dead Buffalo Lake, and the Battle of Stony Lake before being rerouted to fight in the western theater of the American Civil War.

Braden served two terms in the Minnesota House of Representatives, representing the 14th electoral district from 1867 to 1869 as a Republican in the 9th and 10th sessions of the Minnesota Legislature.

During his time in the Minnesota Legislature, Braden served on the following committees:

- Enrollment (1867–1868)
- Military Affairs (1867–1868)
- Railroads (1867–1868)
- Charitable Institutions (1868)

Braden chaired the Enrollment and Charitable Institutions committees.

Braden's tenure in the Minnesota Legislature began on January 8, 1867, and concluded on January 4, 1869. His district included representation for Fillmore County. Braden also served three terms as treasurer of Fillmore County, holding this office from 1873 to 1881.

Braden served two terms as the fourth state auditor of Minnesota, holding office from January 10, 1882, to January 1891.

- In the 1881 Minnesota State Auditor election, Braden defeated Democratic Party nominee Rudolph Lehmicke, Greenback Party nominee Ebenezer Ayres, and Prohibition Party nominee G.A. Armstrong with more than 62% of the vote.
- In the 1886 Minnesota State Auditor election, Braden defeated Democratic nominee Gustave (G.A.) Lundberg and Prohibition nominee Hiram W. (H.W.) Allen with more than 54% of the vote, making him the first Minnesota state auditor to be elected to a four-year term.

Braden was preceded as state auditor by Republican Orlan P. Whitcomb and succeeded by Democrat Adolph Biermann.

Following his tenure as state auditor, Braden was appointed land commissioner for the Great Northern road.

Braden was an unsuccessful candidate for governor of Minnesota in 1890, being defeated by incumbent William Rush Merriam in the Republican primary election.

Outside of politics, Braden was a farmer.

== Personal life and death ==
Braden resided in Lenora during his tenure in the Minnesota Legislature, though was a resident of Preston at the time of the 1881 state auditor election.

Braden died in California on March 11, 1897.

== Electoral history ==
=== 1881 ===
1881 Minnesota State Auditor election
Party	Candidate	Votes	%
Republican	William W. (W.W.) Braden	65,964	62.31
Democratic	Rudolph Lehmicke	36,501	34.48
Greenback	Ebenezer Ayres	2,547	2.41
Prohibition	G.A. Armstrong	769	0.73
Write-in		77	0.07
Total votes		105,858	100.00
Republican hold			

=== 1886 ===
1886 Minnesota State Auditor election
Party	Candidate	Votes	%
Republican	William W. (W.W.) Braden (incumbent)	113,796	54.78
Democratic	Gustave (G.A.) Lundberg	84,919	40.88
Prohibition	Hiram W. (H.W.) Allen	8,890	4.28
Write-in		137	0.07
Total votes		207,742	100.00
Republican hold			

Minnesota House of Representatives
Preceded by —	Member of the Minnesota House of Representatives from the 14th district 1867–1869	Succeeded by —
Political offices
Preceded by Orlan P. Whitcomb	Auditor of Minnesota; 1882–1891	Succeeded by Adolph Biermann
