= 1869 Minnesota State Auditor election =

- November 2, 1869
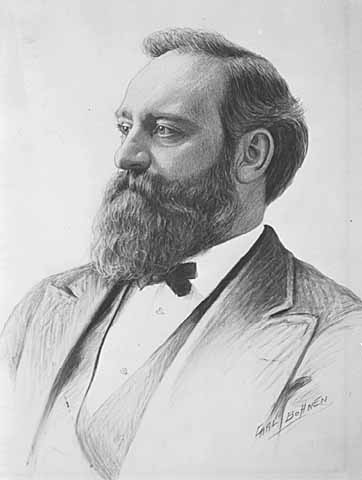

Nominee	Charles McIlrath	Louis A. Evans
Party	Republican	Democratic
Popular vote	29,552	23,030
Percentage	54.91%	42.79%
State Auditor before election
Charles McIlrath
Republican
Elected State Auditor
Charles McIlrath
Republican

The 1869 Minnesota State Auditor election was held on November 2, 1869, in order to elect the state auditor of Minnesota. Republican nominee and incumbent state auditor Charles McIlrath defeated Democratic nominee and former member of the Minnesota Senate Louis A. Evans and Temperance nominee John S. Randolph.

== General election ==
On election day, November 2, 1869, Republican nominee Charles McIlrath won re-election by a margin of 6,522 votes against his foremost opponent Democratic nominee Louis A. Evans, thereby retaining Republican control over the office of state auditor. McIlrath was sworn in for his fourth term on January 9, 1870.

=== Results ===
Minnesota State Auditor election, 1869
Party	Candidate	Votes	%
Republican	Charles McIlrath (incumbent)	29,552	54.91
Democratic	Louis A. Evans	23,030	42.79
Prohibition	John S. Randolph	1,242	2.30
Total votes		53,824	100.00
Republican hold			
