= 1860 Minnesota State Auditor election =

- November 6, 1860
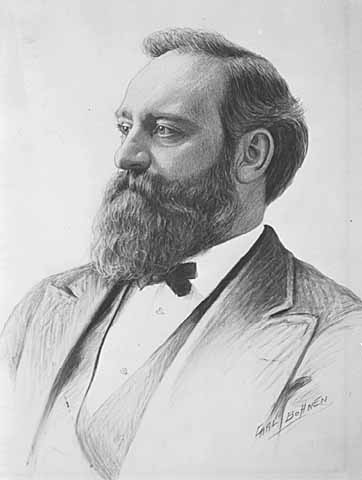

Nominee	Charles McIlrath	Herman Trott
Party	Republican	Democratic
Popular vote	21,464	12,153
Percentage	62.40%	35.33%
State Auditor before election
William F. Dunbar
Democratic
Elected State Auditor
Charles McIlrath
Republican

The 1860 Minnesota State Auditor election was held on November 6, 1860, in order to elect the state auditor of Minnesota. Republican nominee Charles McIlrath defeated Democratic nominee Herman Trott and Southern Democrats nominee Josiah S. Weiser.

== General election ==
On election day, November 6, 1860, Republican nominee Charles McIlrath won the election by a margin of 9,311 votes against his foremost opponent Democratic nominee Herman Trott, thereby gaining Republican control over the office of state auditor. McIlrath was sworn in as the 2nd state auditor of Minnesota on January 2, 1861.

=== Results ===
Minnesota State Auditor election, 1860
Party	Candidate	Votes	%
Republican	Charles McIlrath	21,464	62.40
Democratic	Herman Trott	12,153	35.33
Southern Democratic	Josiah S. Weiser	779	2.27
Write-in		2	0.00
Total votes		34,398	100.00
Republican gain from Democratic			
