= 1866 Minnesota State Auditor election =

- November 6, 1866
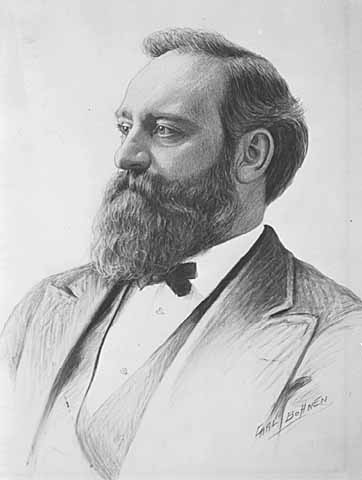

Nominee	Charles McIlrath	Nelson E. Nelson
Party	Republican	Democratic
Popular vote	26,362	15,979
Percentage	62.26%	37.74%
State Auditor before election
Charles McIlrath
Republican
Elected State Auditor
Charles McIlrath
Republican

The 1866 Minnesota State Auditor election was held on November 6, 1866, in order to elect the state auditor of Minnesota. Republican nominee and incumbent state auditor Charles McIlrath defeated Democratic nominee Nelson E. Nelson.

== General election ==
On election day, November 6, 1866, Republican nominee Charles McIlrath won re-election by a margin of 10,383 votes against his opponent Democratic nominee Nelson E. Nelson, thereby retaining Republican control over the office of state auditor. McIlrath was sworn in for his third term on January 11, 1867.

=== Results ===
Minnesota State Auditor election, 1866
Party	Candidate	Votes	%
Republican	Charles McIlrath (incumbent)	26,362	62.26
Democratic	Nelson E. Nelson	15,979	37.74
Total votes		42,341	100.00
Republican hold			
