= 1886 Minnesota State Auditor election =

- November 2, 1886
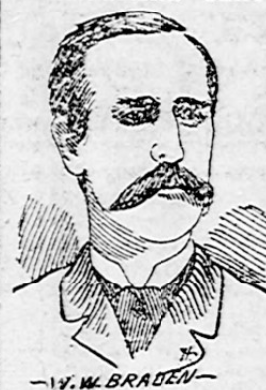

| Nominee | William W. Braden | Gustave A. Lundberg |
| Party | Republican | Democratic |
| Popular vote | 113,796 | 84,919 |
| Percentage | 54.81% | 40.90% |
State Auditor before election
William W. Braden
Republican
Elected State Auditor
William W. Braden
Republican

The 1886 Minnesota State Auditor election was held on November 2, 1886, in order to elect the state auditor of Minnesota. Republican nominee and incumbent state auditor William W. Braden defeated Democratic nominee Gustave A. Lundberg and Prohibition nominee Hiram W. Allen.

== General election ==
On election day, November 2, 1886, Republican nominee William W. Braden won re-election by a margin of 28,877 votes against his foremost opponent Democratic nominee Gustave A. Lundberg, thereby retaining Republican control over the office of state auditor. Braden was sworn in for his second term on January 5, 1887.

=== Results ===
Minnesota State Auditor election, 1886
| Party | Candidate | Votes | % |
|---|---|---|---|
| Republican | William W. Braden (incumbent) | 113,796 | 54.81 |
| Democratic | Gustave A. Lundberg | 84,919 | 40.90 |
| Prohibition | Hiram W. Allen | 8,890 | 4.29 |
| Total votes | | 207,605 | 100.00 |
| Republican hold | | | |
