= 1878 Minnesota State Auditor election =

- November 5, 1878

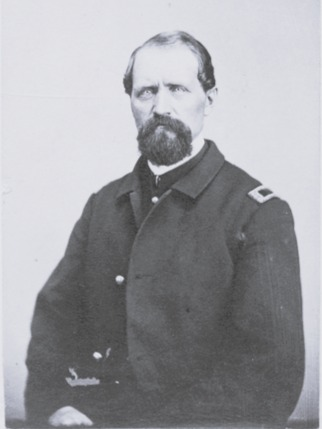

Nominee	Orlan P. Whitcomb	Mahlon Black	Orin H. Page
Party	Republican	Democratic	Greenback
Popular vote	60,059	40,119	6,049
Percentage	56.09%	37.47%	5.65%
State Auditor before election
Orlan P. Whitcomb
Republican
Elected State Auditor
Orlan P. Whitcomb
Republican

The 1878 Minnesota State Auditor election was held on November 5, 1878, in order to elect the state auditor of Minnesota. Republican nominee and incumbent state auditor Orlan P. Whitcomb defeated Democratic nominee and former Mayor of Stillwater Mahlon Black, Greenback nominee Orin H. Page and Prohibition nominee Theodore G. Carter.

== General election ==
On election day, November 5, 1878, Republican nominee Orlan P. Whitcomb won re-election by a margin of 19,940 votes against his foremost opponent Democratic nominee Mahlon Black, thereby retaining Republican control over the office of state auditor. Whitcomb was sworn in for his third term on January 7, 1879.

=== Results ===
Minnesota State Auditor election, 1878
Party	Candidate	Votes	%
Republican	Orlan P. Whitcomb (incumbent)	60,059	56.09
Democratic	Mahlon Black	40,119	37.47
Greenback	Orin H. Page	6,049	5.65
Prohibition	Theodore G. Carter	856	0.79
Total votes		107,083	100.00
Republican hold			
