= Aric Putnam =

American politician

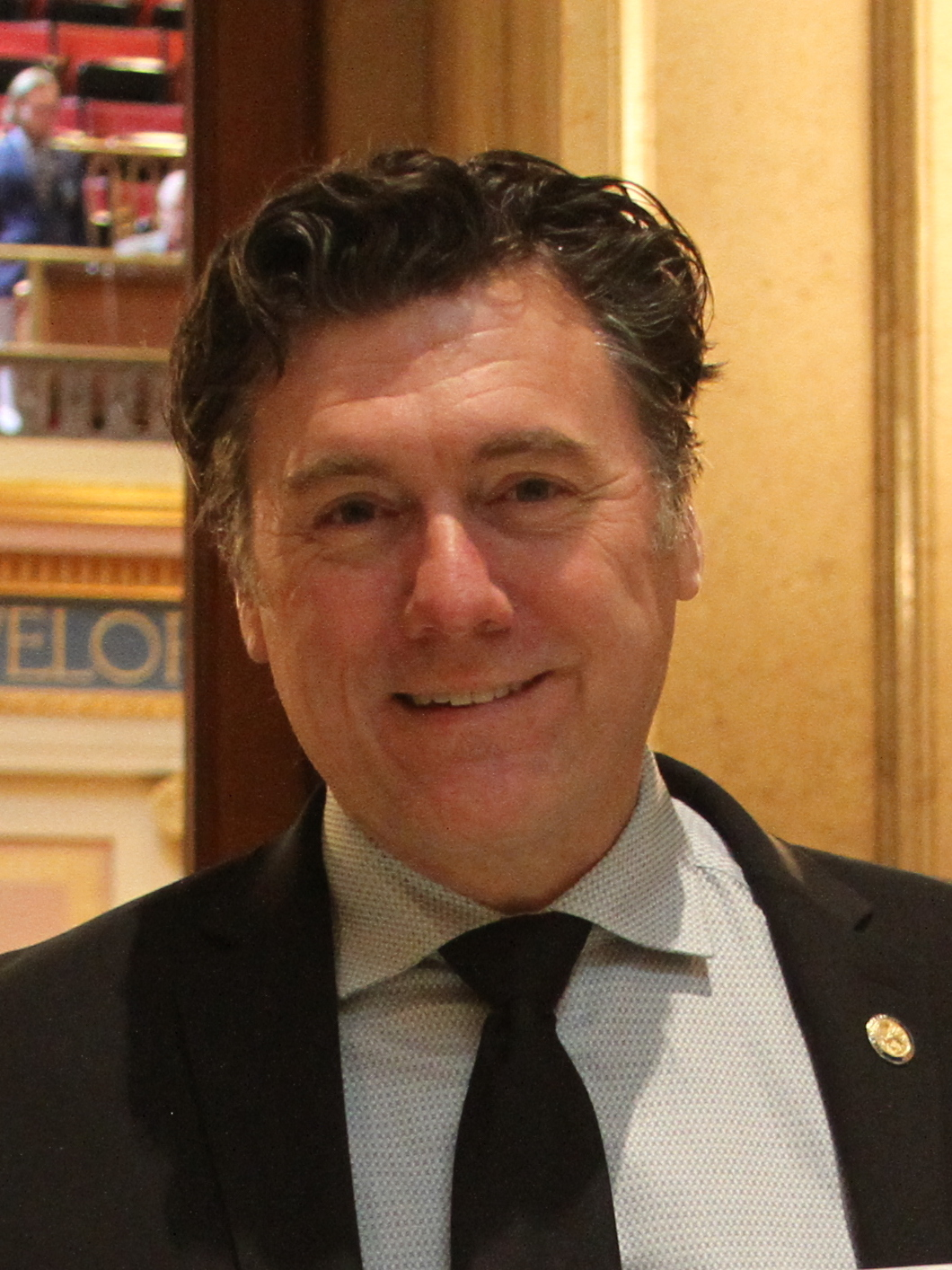

Member of the Minnesota Senate from the 14th district
- Incumbent
- Assumed office January 5, 2021
- Preceded by: Jerry Relph

Personal details
- Born: July 7, 1972 (age 54) Andrews Air Force Base, Maryland, U.S.
- Party: Democratic (DFL)
- Spouse: Laurie Putnam
- Children: 2
- Education: San Francisco State University (BA); University of Maine (MA); University of Minnesota (PhD)

Aric Putnam (/ˈɛərɪk ˈpʌtnəm/ AIR-ik PUTT-nəm; born July 7, 1972) is an American politician and a member of the Minnesota Senate. A member of the Democratic-Farmer-Labor Party (DFL), he represents District 14, which includes parts of Benton, Sherburne, and Stearns counties in central Minnesota.

== Early life, education, and career ==
Putnam was born on Andrews Air Force Base while his father fought in the Vietnam War. After returning, his family moved to California, where he grew up. After graduating from high school, Putnam earned his B.A. at San Francisco State University. He later moved to Maine, where he completed his M.A. at the University of Maine. In the late 1990s, Putnam moved to Minneapolis, Minnesota, where he completed his PhD at the University of Minnesota. He has been a professor of communications at the College of Saint Benedict and Saint John's University since 2003.

== Minnesota State Senate ==
Putnam was elected in 2020, defeating incumbent Republican Jerry Relph, who died after the election. Putnam was reelected in 2022, beating state representative Tama Theis by roughly 5.5 points. He had lost to Theis in the 2016 and 2018 elections for Minnesota House of Representatives District 14A.

Putnam was reelected in 2026 to represent Minnesota Senate District 14, defeating Republican State Representative Bernie Perryman.

Putnam serves on the following committees:

- Agriculture, Veterans, Broadband, and Rural Development (chair)
- Higher Education (vice chair)
- Housing and Homelessness Prevention
- Taxes

== Electoral history ==
Minnesota Senate 14th district election, 2022
| Party | Candidate | Votes | % |
|---|---|---|---|
| Democratic (DFL) | Aric Putnam (incumbent) | 15,350 | 52.29 |
| Republican | Tama Theis | 13,969 | 47.58 |
| Write-in | | 37 | 0.13 |
| Total votes | | 29,356 | 100.0 |
| Democratic (DFL) hold | | | |

Minnesota Senate 14th district election, 2020
| Party | Candidate | Votes | % |
|---|---|---|---|
| Democratic (DFL) | Aric Putnam | 18,318 | 46.39 |
| Republican | Jerry Relph (incumbent) | 18,002 | 45.59 |
| Legal Marijuana Now | Jaden Partlow | 3,127 | 7.92 |
| Write-in | | 41 | 0.10 |
| Total votes | | 39,488 | 100.0 |
| Democratic (DFL) gain from Republican | | | |

Minnesota House of Representatives 14A district election, 2018
| Party | Candidate | Votes | % |
|---|---|---|---|
| Republican | Tama Theis (incumbent) | 9,079 | 52.10 |
| Democratic (DFL) | Aric Putnam | 8,348 | 47.90 |
| Write-in | | 3 | 0.02 |
| Total votes | | 17,430 | 100.0 |
| Republican hold | | | |

Minnesota House of Representatives 14A district election, 2016
| Party | Candidate | Votes | % |
|---|---|---|---|
| Republican | Tama Theis (incumbent) | 10,961 | 54.65 |
| Democratic (DFL) | Aric Putnam | 9,059 | 45.17 |
| Write-in | | 37 | 0.18 |
| Total votes | | 20,057 | 100.0 |
| Republican hold | | | |
