= 1875 Minnesota State Auditor election =

- November 2, 1875

Nominee	Orlan P. Whitcomb	Patrick H. Rahilly
Party	Republican	Democratic
Popular vote	45,831	35,994
Percentage	55.01%	43.20%
State Auditor before election
Orlan P. Whitcomb
Republican
Elected State Auditor
Orlan P. Whitcomb
Republican

The 1875 Minnesota State Auditor election was held on November 2, 1875, in order to elect the state auditor of Minnesota. Republican nominee and incumbent state auditor Orlan P. Whitcomb defeated Democratic nominee Patrick H. Rahilly and Temperance nominee Asa B. Hutchinson.

== General election ==
On election day, November 2, 1875, Republican nominee Orlan P. Whitcomb won re-election by a margin of 9,837 votes against his foremost opponent Democratic nominee Patrick H. Rahilly, thereby retaining Republican control over the office of state auditor. Whitcomb was sworn in for his second term on January 7, 1876.

=== Results ===
Minnesota State Auditor election, 1875
Party	Candidate	Votes	%
Republican	Orlan P. Whitcomb (incumbent)	45,831	55.01
Democratic	Patrick H. Rahilly	35,994	43.20
Prohibition	Asa B. Hutchinson	1,493	1.79
Total votes		83,318	100.00
Republican hold			
