= 1863 Minnesota State Auditor election =

- November 3, 1863
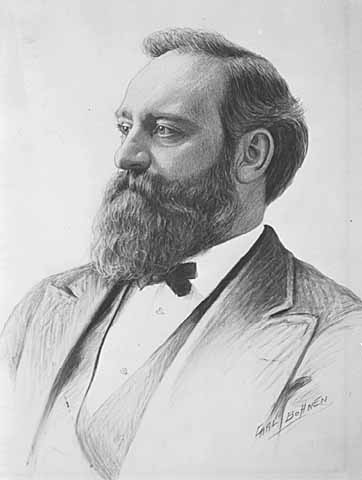

Nominee	Charles McIlrath	John H. McKinney
Party	Republican	Democratic
Popular vote	19,261	12,190
Percentage	61.24%	38.76%
State Auditor before election
Charles McIlrath
Republican
Elected State Auditor
Charles McIlrath
Republican

The 1863 Minnesota State Auditor election was held on November 3, 1863, in order to elect the state auditor of Minnesota. Republican nominee and incumbent state auditor Charles McIlrath defeated Democratic nominee John H. McKinney.

== General election ==
On election day, November 3, 1863, Republican nominee Charles McIlrath won re-election by a margin of 7,071 votes against his opponent Democratic nominee John H. McKinney, thereby retaining Republican control over the office of state auditor. McIlrath was sworn in for his second term on January 11, 1864.

=== Results ===
Minnesota State Auditor election, 1863
Party	Candidate	Votes	%
Republican	Charles McIlrath (incumbent)	19,261	61.24
Democratic	John H. McKinney	12,190	38.76
Total votes		31,451	100.00
Republican hold			
