= Anti-Monopoly Party =

Political party in the United States

- Leader: Ignatius L. Donnelly
- Founded: 1874; 152 years ago
- Dissolved: 1886; 140 years ago
- Merged into: Populist Party
- Headquarters: Chicago, Illinois
- Ideology: Anti-monopolism
- Political position: Left-wing
- Colors: Lime green

The Anti-Monopoly Party was a short-lived American political party. The party nominated Benjamin Butler for President of the United States in 1884, as did the Greenback Party, which ultimately supplanted the organization.

== Organizational history ==
"A Prophecy," a political cartoon by George Frederick Keller published in The Wasp, October 28, 1882

The first organized Anti-Monopoly Party was founded in Minnesota in 1874 by former congressman Ignatius L. Donnelly.

The Anti-Monopoly Party was founded as a national political party in 1884 at its convention in Chicago, which took place on May 14, 1884. Prior to this convention, however, there were Anti-Monopoly Parties operating at the state level, notably in California and New York. The party's platform was similar to those of other parties identified as progressive. The party advocated such measures as direct election of senators, a graduated income tax, industrial arbitration and the establishment of labor bureaus to enhance the legal rights of organized labor, and antitrust legislation, among other matters. The party also opposed the use of the tariff and the granting of public land to railroads and other corporations.

Former U.S. army general and Massachusetts governor Benjamin Butler was nominated to run as the party's candidate for president in the 1884 election; he was similarly nominated by the Greenback Party. Both parties nominated Absolom M. West of Mississippi for vice president. Butler received 175,370 votes in the election. The party largely disappeared after the election, though a small fringe remained in Kansas, running local candidates until 1886.

The People's Party's Omaha Platform contained many planks of the Anti-Monopoly platform. Subsequently, the Progressive movement saw the enactment of many political reform measures first championed by the Anti-Monopolists and Greenbackers.

== Elected officials ==
One Anti-Monopoly party member was elected to the United States House of Representatives and one member to the U.S. Senate:

- Newton Booth, senator from California. Served in the 44th, 45th, and 46th United States Congress, from 1875 to 1881.
- Benjamin F. Shively, representative from Indiana's 13th congressional district. Served in the 48th United States Congress from March 4, 1883, to March 3, 1885.
- Edwin W. Dyke, Minnesota State Treasurer from 1873 to 1876, was originally elected as a Republican but switched parties to the Anti-Monopoly party during his unsuccessful bid for a second term.
