= 3rd Minnesota Legislature =

1861 legislative session

Third Minnesota Legislature
←	2nd Minnesota Legislature	4th Minnesota Legislature	→
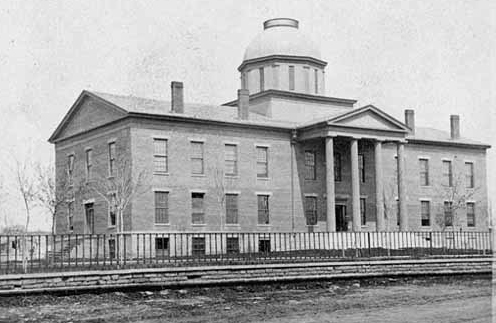

Overview
- Legislative body: Minnesota Legislature
- Jurisdiction: Minnesota, United States
- Term: January 8, 1861 – January 7, 1862
- Website: www.leg.state.mn.us

Minnesota State Senate
- Members: 21 Senators
- Lieutenant Governor: Ignatius L. Donnelly
- Party control: Republican Party

Minnesota House of Representatives
- Members: 42 Representatives
- Speaker: Jared Benson
- Party control: Republican Party

The third Minnesota Legislature first convened on January 8, 1861. The 21 members of the Minnesota Senate and the 42 members of the Minnesota House of Representatives were elected during the General Election of November 6, 1860.

== Sessions ==
The legislature met in a regular session from January 8, 1861 to March 8, 1861. There were no special sessions of the third legislature.

== Party summary ==
Resignations and new members are discussed in the "Membership changes" section, below.

=== Senate ===
	Party (Shading indicates majority caucus)			Total	Vacant
	Democratic	Independent	Republican	Total	Vacant
End of previous Legislature	11	1	25	37	0
Begin	2	0	19	21	0
April 29, 1861 (Note: The exact date of John H. Pell's resignation is unknown. In lieu of the actual date of resignation, Minnesota Legislators Past & Present lists April 29, 1861—the date immediately preceding the date of Pell's enlistment in the Army—as the end of his tenure.)	2	0	18	20	1
December 31, 1861 (Note: The date of Stiles P. Jones' death is unknown, except that it occurred sometime after the end of the 1861 session, but before the end of the year. In lieu of the actual date of Jones' death, Minnesota Legislators Past & Present lists December 31, 1861 as the end of his tenure.)	2	0	17	19	2
January 6, 1862 (Note: The exact dates of Thomas J. Galbraith's, Henry W. Holley's, and George Watson's resignations are unknown. In lieu of the actual dates of their resignation, Minnesota Legislators Past & Present lists January 6, 1862—the date immediately preceding the date on which the 4th Minnesota Legislature convened—as the end of their tenures.)	2	0	14	16	5
Latest voting share	13%	0%	88%		
Beginning of the next Legislature	5	0	16	21	0

=== House of Representatives ===
	Party (Shading indicates majority caucus)			Total	Vacant
	Democratic	Republican	Union Dem.	Total	Vacant
End of previous Legislature	19	61	0	80	0
Begin	3	39	0	42	0
January 9, 1861 (Note: The exact date on which Jefferson Parish Kidder's term ended and Andrew Nessell's term began is uncertain, so, in lieu of such date, Minnesota Legislators Past & Present lists January 9, 1861—the day after the third legislature was convened.)	2	40	0	42	0
May 1, 1861 (Note: The exact date on which Edmund E. Paulding left office as a legislator to work in Washington, D.C. is unknown. Sources indicate it was in either April or May 1861; Minnesota Legislators Past & Present splits the difference by listing May 1, 1861.)	2	39	0	41	1
December 31, 1861 (Note: The date of L. D. Patterson's death is unknown, except that it occurred sometime after the end of the 1861 session, but before the end of the year. In lieu of the actual date of Patterson's death, Minnesota Legislators Past & Present lists December 31, 1861 as the end of his tenure.)	2	38	0	40	2
Latest voting share	5%	95%	0%		
Beginning of the next Legislature	10	30	2	42	0

== Leadership ==
=== Senate ===
Lieutenant Governor
Ignatius L. Donnelly (R-Nininger)

=== House of Representatives ===
Speaker of the House
Jared Benson (R-Anoka)

== Members ==
=== Senate ===
Name	District	City	Party
Baldwin, Rufus J.	05	Minneapolis	Republican
Barney, Sheldon F.	17	Mankato	Republican
Bennett, Samuel	06	Monticello	Republican
Cleveland, Guy K.	20	Winnebago City	Republican
Cook, Michael	08	Faribault	Republican
Fake, J. W.	15	Austin	Democratic
Galbraith, Thomas Jacob	18	Shakopee	Republican
Gibbs, Seth	03	Clearwater	Republican
Hayes, Archibald M.	07	Hastings	Republican
Heaton, David	04	Saint Anthony	Republican
Holley, Henry W.	14	Chatfield	Republican
Jones, Stiles P.	12	Rochester	Republican
Lynd, James W.	19	Henderson	Republican
McLaren, Robert N.	09	Red Wing	Republican
McRoberts, Thomas	13	La Crescent	Democratic
Norton, Daniel Sheldon	11	Winona	Republican
Pell, John H.	10	Plainview	Republican
Reiner, Joel K.	02	Marine	Republican
Sanborn, John Benjamin	21	Saint Paul	Republican
Smith, James K.	01	Saint Paul	Republican
Watson, George	16	Sumner	Republican

=== House of Representatives ===
Name	District	City	Party
Acker, Henry	01	Saint Paul	Republican
Banning, William L.	21	Saint Paul	Republican
Baxter, William R.	06	Glencoe	Republican
Benson, Jared	04	Anoka	Republican
Butler, A. H.	14	Newburg	Republican
Cathcart, Thomas	03	Crow Wing	Republican
Chamblin, M. A.	07	Lewiston	Republican
Chapman, Joseph E.	09	Cannon Falls	Republican
Cheadle, Asa	17	Cleveland	Republican
Child, James E.	16	Wilton	Republican
Cornell, Francis R.E.	05	Minneapolis	Republican
Driscoll, Frederick	18	Sand Creek	Republican
Gregory, P. L.	03	Saint Cloud	Republican
Hanscome, M. G.	19	Saint Peter	Republican
Harkins, Abram	12	Greenfield	Republican
Hayden, Wentworth	05	Champlin	Republican
Hoskins, J. D.	08	Northfield	Republican
Howe, J. P.	14	Granger	Republican
Hunt, Thomas J.	15	Concord	Republican
Kennedy, Vincent P.	06	Greenleaf	Republican
Kidder, Jefferson Parish	01	Saint Paul	Democratic
Le Blond, John	13	Brownsville	Democratic
Mahew, G. V.	04	Sauk Rapids	Republican
Mantor, Peter	15	Mantorville	Republican
Morrison, H. G.O.	07	Pine Bend	Republican
Munch, Emil D.	02	Chengwatana	Republican
Nessell, Andrew	01	Saint Paul	Republican
Patterson, L. D.	17	Mankato	Republican
Paulding, Edmund E.	19	Saint Peter	Republican
Pettit, W. F.	16	Owatonna	Democratic
Sargeant, M. Wheeler	11	Winona	Republican
Sherwood, Charles D.	14	Elkhorn	Republican
Smith, T. Dwight	06	Chaska	Republican
Stewart, George W.	17	Le Sueur	Republican
Strecker, A.	20	New Ulm	Republican
Tattersall, William K.	12	High Forest	Republican
Tefft, Natahniel S.	10	Minneiska	Republican
Hewitt L. Thomas	02	Afton	Republican
Warner, Ebenezer	11	Saint Charles	Republican
Wheeler, Levi	03	Little Falls	Republican
White, Clark R.	09	Pine Island	Republican
Whiting, Erastus D.	02	Taylors Falls	Republican
Wood, Charles	08	Morristown	Republican

== Membership changes ==
=== Senate ===
District	Vacated by	Reason for change	Successor	Date successor seated
18	Thomas J. Galbraith (R)	Resigned on date uncertain.	Remained vacant	
14	Henry W. Holley (R)	Resigned on date uncertain.	Remained vacant	
12	Stiles P. Jones (R)	Died in office on September 25, 1861.	Remained vacant	
10	John H. Pell (R)	Resigned on date uncertain, to enlist in the United States Army.	Remained vacant	
16	George Watson (R)	Resigned on date uncertain.	Remained vacant	

=== House of Representatives ===
District	Vacated by	Reason for change	Successor	Date successor seated
01	Jefferson Parish Kidder (D)	Kidder was originally certified as the winner of the election; however, Nessell contested the results. Upon examination, the House determined that a clerical error had shown Kidder winning by a margin of two votes, when Nessell actually won by a margin of one vote. The House hence ruled that Nessell was entitled to the seat.	Andrew Nessell (R)	January 9, 1861
17	L. D. Patterson (R)	Died in office on date uncertain.	Remained vacant	
19	Edmund E. Paulding (R)	Appointed on date uncertain to serve as U.S. Army paymaster for Minnesota, in Washington, D.C.	Remained vacant	

== Notes ==
Preceded by Second Minnesota Legislature	Third Minnesota Legislature; 1861	Succeeded by Fourth Minnesota Legislature
