= Charles Scheffer =

American politician and banker (1835 – 1875)

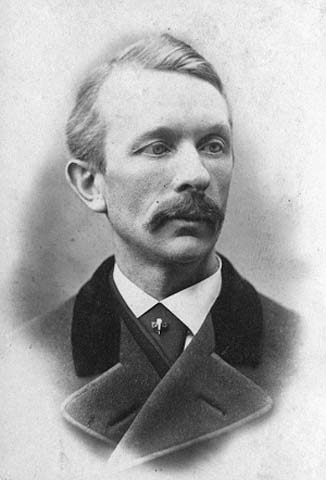
- Scheffer c.1870

2nd Minnesota State Treasurer
- Governor: Alexander Ramsey; Henry Adoniram Swift; Stephen Miller; William Rainey Marshall
- Preceded by: George W. Armstrong
- Succeeded by: Emil D. Munch
- In office January 1, 1860 – January 10, 1868

Personal details
- Born: February 22, 1835 Rheinberg, Rhine Province, Kingdom of Prussia
- Died: August 7, 1875 (aged 40) Saint Paul, Minnesota, U.S.
- Resting place: Oakland Cemetery; Saint Paul, Minnesota, U.S.
- Other political affiliations: Republican
- Spouse(s): Kate Finch (m. 1862) Jennie Goodrich (m. 1874)
- Relations: Albert Scheffer (brother)

Charles "Carl" Scheffer (February 22, 1835 – August 7, 1875) was an American banker, businessman, and politician who served four consecutive terms as the second Minnesota State Treasurer from January 1, 1860, to January 10, 1868.

== Early life ==
Scheffer was born on February 22, 1835, in the city of Rheinberg, then part of the Kingdom of Prussia. According to the Ramsey County Historical Society Scheffer immigrated to the United States from Germany in 1848. Scheffer first lived in Milwaukee before moving to Fond du Lac, Wisconsin, Scheffer later moved to Minnesota Territory in 1856.

== Banking and politics ==
In 1856 Scheffer settled in Stillwater, Minnesota where he worked as a banking clerk alongside K.A. Darling of Fond du Lac and L.R. Carswell of Hastings, Minnesota and helped to form the First Bank of Stillwater. Scheffer eventually became the bank's president and merged the bank of J. E. Thompson of Stillwater to create the First National Bank of Stillwater on July 19, 1865. At this time Scheffer was also the banking mentor to his younger brother, Albert Scheffer, who would go on to serve in the American Civil War and run for office in the Minnesota Senate.

Beginning in 1859 Scheffer ran for the political office of Minnesota State Treasurer as a member of the Republican Party of Minnesota against the Democratic candidate Samuel B. Abbe. Scheffer won 55.04% of the vote with a majority margin of 10.99%. Scheffer was preceded in office by Minnesota politician George W. Armstrong. Scheffer would occupy the office of Minnesota State Treasurer for four consecutive terms before being succeeded by Emil D. Munch as state treasurer in January 1868.

== Death ==
Following a locomotive accident in Washington, D.C. in 1874, Scheffer was seriously wounded in the head. This injury is purported to have caused severe pain in Scheffer's spinal column and later led to bouts of depression. Convinced he would never fully recover Scheffer committed suicide with a pistol in the German Lutheran Cemetery in Saint Paul on August 7, 1875. It was reported by the local Saint Paul newspaper The Anti-Monopolist that Scheffer suffered two gunshot wounds, one in the stomach and one in the heart. Scheffer's funeral was reported to be one of the largest in Saint Paul at the time, attracting hundreds of mourners, among them were state officials, business partners, and his own employees. Scheffer was buried in Oakland Cemetery in Saint Paul.

== Personal life ==
Scheffer was married twice, first to Kate Finch in 1862, and again to Jennie Goodrich in 1874. Scheffer was the older brother of Minnesota Republican state senator and American Civil War veteran Albert Scheffer.

Political offices
Preceded by George W. Armstrong	Treasurer of Minnesota; 1860–1868	Succeeded by Emil D. Munch
