= Emil D. Munch =

American politician and businessman

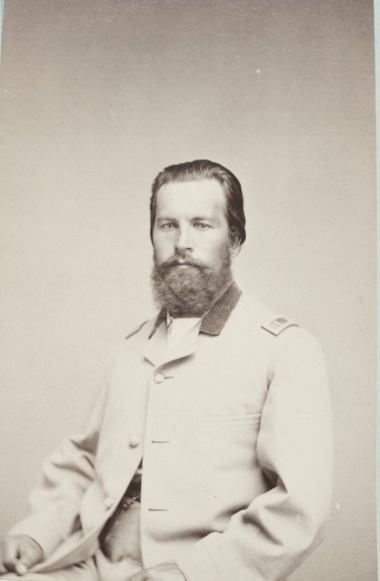
- Munch c. 1861 by Joel Emmons Whitney

3rd Minnesota State Treasurer
- In office January 10, 1868 – January 5, 1872
- Preceded by: Charles Scheffer
- Succeeded by: William Seeger

Member of the Minnesota House of Representatives from the 2nd District
- In office January 8, 1861 – January 6, 1862 Serving with: Hewitt L. Thomas; Erastus D. Whiting

Personal details
- Born: December 12, 1831 Halberstadt, Kingdom of Prussia
- Died: August 31, 1887 (aged 55) Afton, Minnesota, U.S.
- Resting place: Oakland Cemetery; Saint Paul, Minnesota, U.S.

Military service
- Allegiance: United States of America
- Branch/service: Union Army
- Years of service: 1861–1862
- Rank: Captain; Major (militia)
- Unit: 1st Minnesota Light Artillery Battery; Veteran Reserve Corps
- Commands: 1st Minnesota Light Artillery Battery
- Battles/wars: American Civil War; Battle of Shiloh (WIA); Second Battle of Corinth; Dakota War of 1862

Emil D. Munch (December 12, 1831 – August 30, 1887) was a German American politician, businessman, and American Civil War veteran from Minnesota.

Munch was born in Halberstadt, Prussia. He emigrated to the United States in 1849 and settled in Taylors Falls, Minnesota in 1852, and then in Chengwatana, Minnesota in 1857. He was in the lumber industry and owned a sawmill. Munch served in the Minnesota House of Representatives in 1860 and 1861. He was a Republican. During the American Civil War, Munch served as the Captain of the 1st Minnesota Light Artillery Battery and was later commissioned as a Major in the Minnesota Militia. Munch was wounded during the American Civil War at the Battle of Shiloh when he was shot in his hip by a minié ball. Munch later served as Minnesota State Treasurer from 1868 to 1872. He continued to be involved in the lumber business. Munch also operated a flour mill in Afton, Minnesota. He died in Afton on August 31, 1887 at the age of 55 and is buried in Oakland Cemetery.
