= 1st Minnesota Light Artillery Battery =

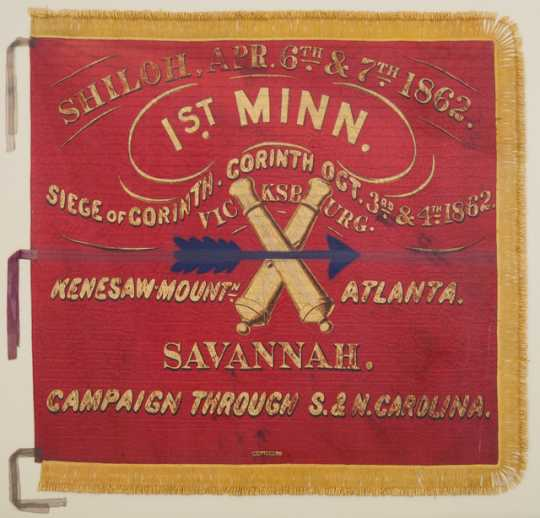
- 1st Minnesota Light Artillery Battery Battle Flag
- Active: November 21, 1861, to July 1, 1865
- Country: United States
- Allegiance: Union
- Branch: Artillery
- Engagements: American Civil War: Shiloh Campaign; Battle of Shiloh; Iuka-Corinth Campaign; Second Battle of Corinth; Vicksburg Campaign; Siege of Vicksburg; Atlanta campaign; Battle of Kennesaw Mountain; Siege of Atlanta; Carolinas campaign; Battle of Bentonville

Commanders
- Notable commanders: Emil D. Munch

The 1st Minnesota Light Artillery Battery was a Minnesota USV artillery battery that served in the Union Army during the American Civil War.

== Service ==
The battery was mustered in at Fort Snelling, Minnesota. on November 21, 1861.

The 1st Minnesota Light Artillery Battery was mustered out at St. Paul, Minnesota, on July 1, 1865.

== Commanders ==
- Captain Emil D. Munch - November 7, 1861, to December 25, 1862
- Captain William Z. Clayton - December 25, 1862, to July 1, 1865.

== Casualties and total strength ==
The 1st Minnesota Light Artillery Battery lost 1 officer and 7 enlisted men killed in action or died of wounds received in battle and 1 officer and 29 enlisted men died of disease. Total fatalities were 38.

== Battles and campaigns ==
The 1st Minnesota Light Artillery Battery took part in the Battle of Shiloh, Siege of Vicksburg, the Atlanta campaign and Sherman's March to the Sea. They served in the 4th Division of the 17th U.S. Army Corps. On 5 March 1864, Captain Clayton exchanged the old guns, two 12-pound howitzers, and two 6-pound rifled guns, caliber 3.67, for four new rifled 3-inch Rodman's guns. The 3-inch Rodman guns were actually 3-inch ordnance rifles.

== See also ==
- List of Minnesota Civil War Units
