= Edwin W. Dyke =

American banker and politician (1820–1911)

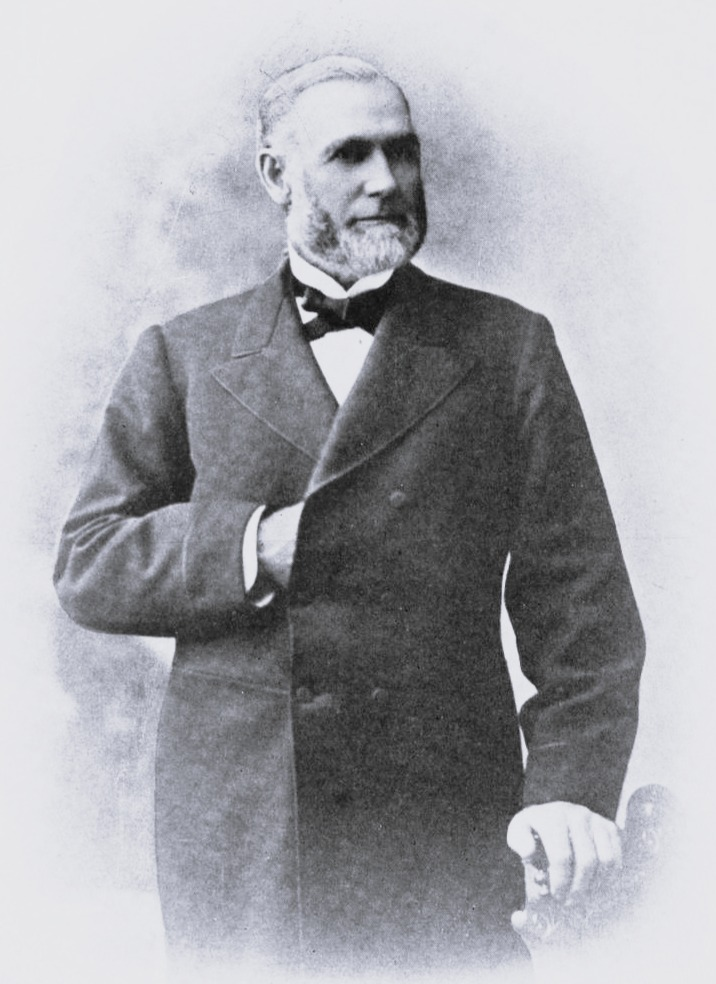

5th Minnesota State Treasurer
- In office February 7, 1873 – January 7, 1876
- Governor: Horace Austin; Cushman K. Davis; John S. Pillsbury
- Preceded by: William Seeger
- Succeeded by: William Pfaender

Personal details
- Born: February 10, 1820 Chittenden, Vermont, U.S.
- Died: March 17, 1911 (aged 91) California, U.S.
- Other political affiliations: Republican (pre-1873); Anti-Monopoly Party (1873)
- Education: Burr and Burton Seminary

Military service
- Allegiance: United States of America
- Branch/service: Minnesota Militia
- Rank: Major
- Battles/wars: Dakota War of 1862

Edwin W. Dyke (February 10, 1820 – March 17, 1911), also spelled as Edwin W. Dike, was an American banker, businessman, and politician who served as the fifth Minnesota State Treasurer from 1873 to 1876.

== Early life and career ==
Edwin W. Dyke was born on February 10, 1820 in Chittenden, Vermont. Dyke was educated in public schools and later studied at the Burr and Burton Seminary (now the Burr and Burton Academy) in Manchester, Vermont. Following his education Dyke worked at a general store in Brandon, Vermont before studying mechanics and working for the Rutland and Burlington Railroad Company (now the Rutland Railroad). Dyke later worked for the Cove Machine Company out of Providence, Rhode Island which manufactured calico textiles.

Beginning in 1857 Dyke moved to Minnesota Territory and chose to settle in the city of Faribault in Rice County, Minnesota along with his cousin William H. Dike. While in Faribault Dyke worked as a moneylender and importer of goods from Baltimore. Dyke later helped found the First National Bank of Faribault in 1868 and was the bank's first vice president.

During the aftermath of the Dakota War of 1862 Dyke was appointed as the citizen provost marshal of Mankato, Minnesota with the militia rank of Major. Dyke and other mounted provost units later acted as guards during the 1862 Mankato mass execution.

Beginning in February 1873 Dyke was appointed to the office of Minnesota State Treasurer by the Governor of Minnesota Horace Austin in order to replace the defaulting treasurer William Seeger. Seeger resigned from the office of state treasurer after being impeached by the Minnesota House of Representatives for his involvement in the embezzlement of state funds. Although previously a Republican, Dyke would end up running as a Democrat-Anti-Monopolist for the office of state treasurer in November 1873 where he defeated the Minnesota Republican candidate Mons Grinager with a majority vote of just 1.57%. According to University of Minnesota professor Dr. Eric Ostermeier, Dyke's electoral success in the 1873 election was the only Democrat statewide victory in Minnesota (then a largely Republican voter state) between 1857 and 1890. Later during the Panic of 1873 Dyke was responsible for managing states funds and bringing order to the state budget. Dyke attempted to run for the office of Minnesota State Treasurer again in 1875 as a member of the Anti-Monopoly Party but was beaten by Minnesota Republican and Dakota War veteran William Pfaender. In total, Dyke served in the administrations of three different Minnesota governors, those being; Horace Austin, Cushman K. Davis, and John S. Pillsbury.

Following his term as state treasurer Dyke was appointed in 1883 by president of the United States Chester A. Arthur as one of three United States Commissioners to inspect the Santa Fe Railroad. Following his railroad tenure Dyke moved to Santa Monica, California where he became a stockholder and the vice president of the Santa Monica Investment Company.

== Personal life ==
Dyke was married to Julia C. Robinson of Woodstock, Illinois. Dyke's elder cousin, William Hammond Dike (1813-1888), who also settled in Rice County was a soldier in the Union Army and later became the Major of the 1st Minnesota Infantry Regiment.

== Death ==
According to the Minnesota Historical Election Archive Dyke died on March 17, 1911 at the age of 91.

Political offices
Preceded by William Seeger	Treasurer of Minnesota; 1873-1876	Succeeded by William Pfaender
