= Bjorn Olson =

American politician

Speaker pro tempore of the Minnesota House of Representatives
- Incumbent
- Assumed office February 6, 2025
- Preceded by: Dan Wolgamott

Member of the Minnesota House of Representatives from the 22A district
- Incumbent
- Assumed office January 5, 2021
- Preceded by: Bob Gunther

Personal details
- Born: January 13, 1991 (age 35) Fairmont, Minnesota, U.S.
- Party: Republican
- Spouse: Hannah
- Children: 3
- Education: Bethel University (BA)
- Website: State House website Campaign website

Military service
- Branch/service: United States Army
- Unit: United States Army Reserve

Bjorn Olson (born January 13, 1991) is an American politician serving since 2021 as a member of the Minnesota House of Representatives and since 2025 as its speaker pro tempore. A member of the Republican Party of Minnesota, Olson represents District 22A in south-central Minnesota, including the city of Fairmont and parts of Blue Earth, Faribault, Martin, and Watonwan Counties.

== Early life, education and career ==
Olson was born in Fairmont, Minnesota, and attended Blue Earth High School. He earned a Bachelor of Arts degree in history and social studies education from Bethel University in 2013.

Olson serves as a Major in the United States Army Reserve. He is a history teacher and farmer and served two terms as mayor of Elmore, Minnesota, before his election to the legislature.

== Minnesota House of Representatives ==
Olson was elected to the Minnesota House of Representatives in 2020 and reelected in 2022. He first ran after 13-term Republican incumbent Bob Gunther announced he would not seek reelection. Gunther endorsed Olson over his primary challenger.

Olson has served as an assistant minority leader since his swearing-in, and also sits on the Taxes, Transportation Finance and Policy, and Veterans and Military Affairs Finance and Policy Committees.

Olson has opposed school bike safety programs due to the rural nature of his district, and opposed efforts to study commuter rail, saying it was like "throwing taxpayer dollars in a pit and lighting them on fire".

== Electoral history ==
2020 Republican Primary for Minnesota State House - District 23A
Party	Candidate	Votes	%
Republican	Bjorn Olson	2,484	57.34
Republican	Michael Sukalski	1,848	42.66
Total votes		4,332	100.0

2020 Minnesota State House - District 23A
Party	Candidate	Votes	%
Republican	Bjorn Olson	14,324	68.45
Democratic (DFL)	Patricia Fahey Bacon	6,523	31.17
Write-in		80	0.38
Total votes		20,927	100.0
Republican hold			

2022 Minnesota State House - District 22A
Party	Candidate	Votes	%
Republican	Bjorn Olson (incumbent)	12,238	69.04
Democratic (DFL)	Marisa Ulmen	5,473	30.88
Write-in		14	0.08
Total votes		17,770	100.0
Republican hold			

2024 Minnesota State House - District 22A
Party	Candidate	Votes	%
Republican	Bjorn Olson (incumbent)	15,699	69.42
Democratic (DFL)	Marisa Ulmen	6,896	30.49
Write-in		21	0.09
Total votes		22,616	100.0
Republican hold			

== Personal life ==
Olson lives in Fairmont, Minnesota, with his wife, Hannah, and has three children. Hannah writes a motherhood blog called "Just Bee Blog". He previously resided in Elmore, Minnesota, and lived in former Vice President and U.S. Senator Walter Mondale's childhood home. He moved to Fairmont following 2022 legislative redistricting.

Minnesota House of Representatives
Preceded by Dan Wolgamott	Speaker pro tempore of the Minnesota House of Representatives; 2025–present	Incumbent
