= Dan Wolgamott =

American politician (born 1990)

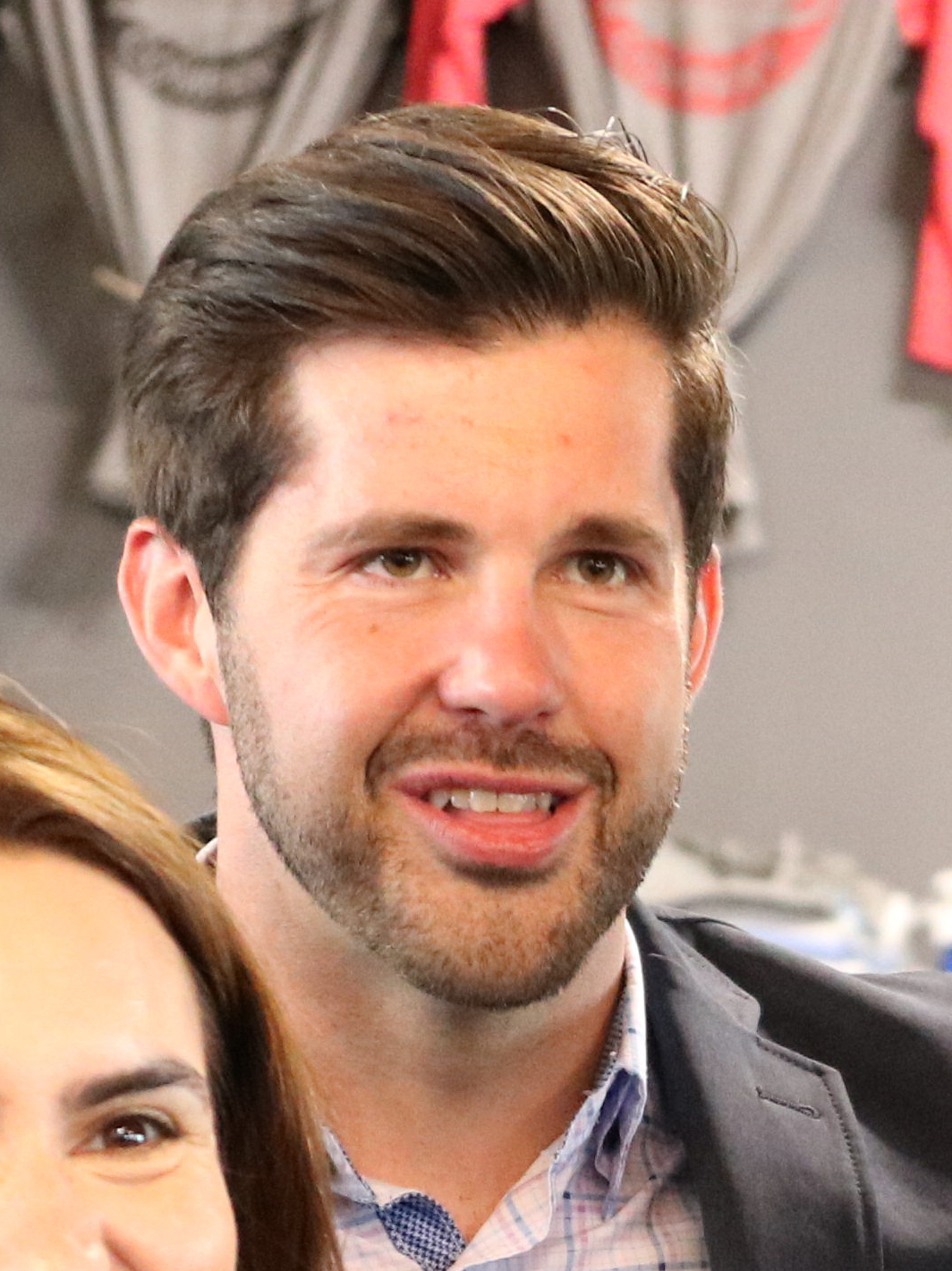
- Wolgamott in 2022

Speaker pro tempore of the Minnesota House of Representatives
- In office January 3, 2023 – January 14, 2025
- Preceded by: Liz Olson
- Succeeded by: Bjorn Olson

Member of the Minnesota House of Representatives from the 14B district
- Incumbent
- Assumed office January 8, 2019
- Preceded by: Jim Knoblach

Personal details
- Born: Daniel Kirk Wolgamott; October 24, 1990 (age 36)
- Party: Democratic (DFL)
- Spouse(s): Nicole Swanson (m. 2014; div. 2021) Erika Mejía (m. 2025; div. 2026)
- Children: 2
- Education: Saint John's University (BA)

Daniel Kirk Wolgamott (born October 24, 1990) is an American politician serving in the Minnesota House of Representatives since 2019. A member of the Minnesota Democratic–Farmer–Labor Party (DFL), Wolgamott represents District 14B in central Minnesota, which includes the city of St. Cloud and parts of Benton, Sherburne, and Stearns Counties.

== Early life, education, and career ==
Wolgamott was raised in the Elkhorn neighborhood of Omaha, Nebraska, and graduated from Elkhorn High School. He attended Saint John's University, graduating with a Bachelor of Arts in political science. In 2011, he was an intern in U.S. Representative Tim Walz's office.

== Minnesota House of Representatives ==
Wolgamott ran for Minnesota House in District 14A in 2014, losing to Republican Tama Theis. He then ran for the Minnesota Senate in District 14 in 2016, losing to Republican Jerry Relph by 141 votes. He was elected to the Minnesota House of Representatives in 2018 and has been reelected every two years since.

In the 2021–22 legislative session, Wolgamott was an assistant majority leader for the Democratic-Farmer-Labor Party House Caucus. He was sworn in as speaker pro tempore of the House on January 3, 2023. Wolgamott is the vice chair of the Higher Education Finance and Policy Committee and sits on the Capital Investment, Labor and Industry Finance and Policy, and Rules and Legislative Administration Committees.

== Legislative record ==
Wolgamatt and Representative Bernie Perryman co-authored the "Minnesota Bitcoin Act", introduced on April 1, 2025. The proposal would allow payments to the state in cryptocurrency and authorize the State Board of Investment to invest in cryptocurrencies. It would also allow payment of property taxes, interest, and penalties to county treasurers in cryptocurrency, and modify how cryptocurrencies affect calculation of how "investment income" and alternative minimum taxable income affects state income tax.

== State Auditor candidacy ==
On September 4, 2025, incumbent Minnesota State Auditor Julie Blaha announced her decision not to run for reelection in 2026. The same day, Wolgamott announced his candidacy for state auditor.

== Personal life ==
Wolgamott has two children. He resides in St. Cloud, Minnesota. He married Nicole Swanson in 2014; the couple divorced in 2021. In June 2024, Wolgamott announced his engagement to Erika Mejía. They married in August 2025. They've since divorced.

=== Legal issues ===
On January 9, 2021, Wolgamott's vehicle was found abandoned in a yard in Golden Valley, Minnesota. Police investigated, noted the roads were icy at the time, and cited Wolgamott with a misdemeanor for abandoning his vehicle on private property without the property owner's consent.

On July 7, 2023, Wolgamott was arrested in Kanabec County, Minnesota, for driving while intoxicated. Two weeks later, surveillance video from a liquor store showed him drinking from a bottle of alcohol in the parking lot before getting in his car and driving away. On August 7, after blood test results showed a blood alcohol content of 0.09, above Minnesota's legal limit of 0.08, Wolgamott was charged with two counts of driving under the influence. He pleaded guilty in September and was sentenced to two years of supervised probation.

On November 11, 2026, Wolgamott was arrested in St. Cloud, Minnesota on suspicion of drunken driving and causing a crash with bodily harm.

== Electoral history ==
2014 Minnesota State House - District 14A
Party	Candidate	Votes	%
Republican	Tama Theis	7,292	54.90
Democratic (DFL)	Dan Wolgamott	5,972	44.96
Write-in		18	0.14
Total votes		13,282	100.0
Republican hold			

2016 Minnesota State Senate - District 14
Party	Candidate	Votes	%
Republican	Jerry Relph	17,519	47.40
Democratic (DFL)	Dan Wolgamott	17,378	47.02
Libertarian	Stephen Zilberg	2,021	5.47
Write-in		41	0.11
Total votes		39,959	100.0
Republican hold			

2018 Minnesota State House - District 14B
Party	Candidate	Votes	%
Democratic (DFL)	Dan Wolgamott	7,950	58.07
Republican	Jim Knoblach	5,705	41.67
Write-in		36	0.26
Total votes		13,691	100.0
Democratic (DFL) gain from Republican			

2020 Minnesota State House - District 14B
Party	Candidate	Votes	%
Democratic (DFL)	Dan Wolgamott	9,422	55.93
Republican	Paul Brandmire	7,383	43.82
Write-in		42	0.25
Total votes		16,847	100.0
Democratic (DFL) hold			

2022 Minnesota State House - District 14B
Party	Candidate	Votes	%
Democratic (DFL)	Dan Wolgamott	7,652	51.80
Republican	Aaron Henning	7,112	48.14
Write-in		9	0.06
Total votes		14,773	100.0
Democratic (DFL) hold			

2024 Minnesota State House - District 14B
Party	Candidate	Votes	%
Democratic (DFL)	Dan Wolgamott	10,005	50.36
Republican	Sue Ek	9,814	49.40
Write-in		48	0.24
Total votes		19,867	100.0
Democratic (DFL) hold			

Minnesota House of Representatives
Preceded by Liz Olson	Speaker pro tempore of the Minnesota House of Representatives; 2023–2025	Succeeded by Bjorn Olson
