= George W. Armstrong =

American politician (1827–1877)

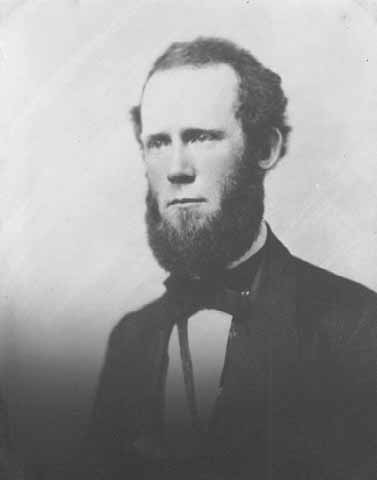

1st Minnesota State Treasurer
- In office May 24, 1858 – January 1, 1860
- Governor: Henry Hastings Sibley
- Preceded by: Office created
- Succeeded by: Charles Scheffer

4th Minnesota Territorial Treasurer
- In office May 6, 1857 – 1858
- Preceded by: Charles E. Leonard
- Succeeded by: Office abolished

Personal details
- Born: George Washington Armstrong; February 27, 1827
- Died: July 1, 1877 (aged 50) Saint Paul, Minnesota, U.S.
- Spouses: Anna Miller (m. 1852; died 1852) Jane Caroline Colman (m. 1859)
- Profession: Politician, businessman

George Washington Armstrong (February 27, 1827 – July 1, 1877) was an American politician and businessman who served as the first Minnesota State Treasurer from 1858 to 1860. He previously served as the fourth and final Minnesota Territorial Treasurer from 1857 to 1858.

== Early life ==
Armstrong was born on February 27, 1827, to John and Elizabeth Armstrong.

== Career ==
Armstrong apprenticed in the printing trade on the Mt. Vernon Banner (Ohio), serving as the paper's joint editor and proprietor from 1847 to 1850. Armstrong moved to Saint Paul, Minnesota, during the spring of 1863, where he engaged in the real estate, insurance, and loan business.

Armstrong was appointed Minnesota territorial commissary general on November 25, 1856; he was subsequently appointed treasurer on May 6, 1857. He served from 1857 to 1858 as the fourth and final Minnesota Territorial Treasurer.

Armstrong was elected the first Minnesota State Treasurer on December 22, 1857. He served from May 24, 1858, to January 1, 1860.

== Personal life and death ==
Armstrong married Anna Miller on March 24, 1852. On October 16 of that same year, Miller died of dysentery in Keokuk, Iowa. Armstrong married Jane Caroline "Jenny" Colman on February 21, 1859. Armstrong and Colman had seven children together.

Armstrong died of a stroke at the age of 50 in Saint Paul, Minnesota on July 1, 1877.

Political offices
Preceded by Charles E. Leonard	4th Minnesota Territorial Treasurer; 1857–1858	Succeeded by Office abolished
Political offices
Preceded by Office created	1st Minnesota State Treasurer; 1858–1860	Succeeded by Charles Scheffer
