= William Seeger =

American soldier and politician (1810 – 1888)

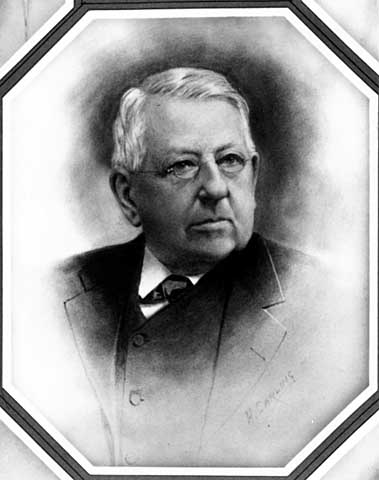
- Seeger c.1873

4th Minnesota State Treasurer
- In office January 5, 1872 – February 7, 1873
- Governor: Horace Austin
- Preceded by: Emil D. Munch
- Succeeded by: Edwin W. Dyke

Minnesota Deputy Treasurer
- In office 1867–1871

Personal details
- Born: May 12, 1810 Lauenburg, Schleswig-Holstein
- Died: May 22, 1888 (aged 78)
- Resting place: Oakland Cemetery; Saint Paul, Minnesota, U.S.
- Other political affiliations: Republican

Military service
- Allegiance: United States of America
- Branch/service: Union Army
- Years of service: 1862–1863
- Rank: Sergeant
- Unit: Company D, 9th Minnesota Infantry Regiment
- Battles/wars: Dakota War of 1862

William Seeger (May 12, 1810 – May 22, 1888) was a German American soldier, politician, and immigration official who served as the Minnesota Deputy State Treasurer from 1867 to 1871, and later served as the fourth Minnesota State Treasurer from 1872 to 1873. Seeger resigned from the office of state treasurer following an indictment for corruption and embezzling state funds in 1873.

== Early life and career ==
Seeger was born on May 12, 1810, in the city of Lauenburg in Schleswig-Holstein. According to the Minnesota Historical Election Archive Seeger emigrated to the United States in 1852 and moved to Minnesota Territory in 1856. Seeger was one of the founding citizens of New Ulm, Minnesota in 1856 alongside William Pfaender and A. Prieser. Seeger was also an early citizen of St. Peter, Minnesota where he was employed as a brewer alongside Joseph Engesser.

At the outbreak of the American Civil War Seeger volunteered for service in the Union Army on August 19, 1862, and was enrolled into the ranks of Company D of the 9th Minnesota Infantry Regiment as a Sergeant under the command of Captain Asgrim Knutson Skaro. Company D of the 9th Minnesota acted as the military guards for the 1862 Mankato mass execution. Seeger was discharged from service on February 28, 1863, due to disability.

Following his service in the military, Seeger was appointed as deputy to the State Treasurer and served from 1867 to 1871 under Emil D. Munch. Beginning in 1871 Seeger ran for the political office of Minnesota State Treasurer as a Republican. Seeger won the November 7, 1871 treasurer election against Democrat candidate Barney Vosberg and Prohibition Party candidate William L. Mintzer with a majority vote of 60.41% and a margin of victory of +21.00%. In 1873 Seeger was indicted by the Minnesota House of Representatives and investigated by the Minnesota Senate for the embezzlement of state funds and corrupt misconduct. Seeger resigned from office before he could be charged, he was replaced by Edwin W. Dyke.

Following his political career Seeger was placed in charge of the Minnesota Board of Immigration. Seeger was instrumental in the establishment of a Russian expatriate colony of Mennonites in Minnesota from the Chortitza Colony in the Russian Empire and the Molotschna Colony in modern-day Ukraine who ended up settling in Mountain Lake, Minnesota and Cottonwood County, Minnesota. Seeger chose Mennonites due to their strong work ethic. Seeger later established another Mennonite colony in Yankton, South Dakota.

== Death ==
Seeger died on May 22, 1888, from dropsy (edema). Seeger is buried in Oakland Cemetery in Saint Paul, Minnesota.
