= Hewitt L. Thomas =

Minnesota politician (1805 – 1895)

Hewitt Ludlow Thomas
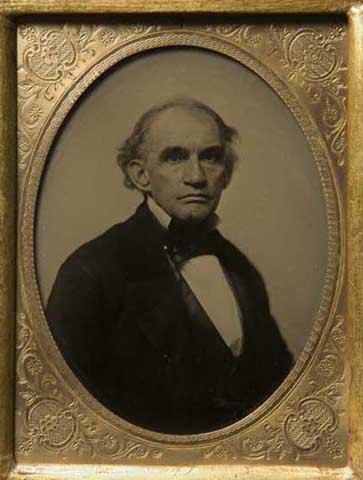
- Thomas c.1858

Member of the Minnesota Senate from the 1st District
- In office December 2, 1857 – December 6, 1859 Serving with Joel K. Reiner
- Succeeded by: William McKusick; Socrates Nelson

Member of the Minnesota House of Representatives
- In office January 8, 1861 – January 5, 1863

Personal details
- Born: April 27, 1805 Tompkins County, New York, U.S.
- Died: October 23, 1895 (aged 90) Cass County, Indiana, U.S.
- Resting place: Galveston Cemetery, Galveston, Indiana, U.S.
- Other political affiliations: Republican
- Spouse: Charlotte Corday Helm
- Children: 4, including Minor T. Thomas
- Education: Miami University
- Occupation: Teacher lawyer politician

Hewitt Ludlow Thomas (April 27, 1805 – October 23, 1895) was an American educator, businessman, lawyer, judge, and politician who served in the Minnesota Senate and the Minnesota House of Representatives. Thomas was also the father of Union Army Brigadier General Minor T. Thomas.

== Early life ==
Hewitt Ludlow Thomas was born on April 27, 1805, in Tompkins County, New York, to parents Reverend Minor Thomas, a Baptist minister, and Nancy Thomas (née Wynans). Thomas was educated in common school while working as a farmer in New York and eventually became a teacher and studied in Oxford, Ohio, for several months before moving to Fayette County, Indiana, in 1826.

== Career ==
=== Teaching and law ===
Beginning in 1828 Thomas began a subscription school in Harrison Township where he would teach privately. Between 1831 and 1836 Thomas lived and taught in Connersville (1831), Waterloo Township (1832), and Harrison Township (1834) before relocating to Clinton Township in 1837. While living in Clinton Thomas built a log cabin and settled land as a farmer. Thomas was also the initial schoolmaster of Clinton township and was later elected as the township's justice of the peace. Although Thomas was an educator, he was elected as the associate judge of Cass County from 1845 to 1847.

=== Political career ===
Thomas moved to Minnesota Territory in 1855 following his son, Minor T. Thomas, who had originally settled in the territory to recover from malaria. The Minnesota Legislative Reference Library also confirms Thomas' move to Minnesota Territory as being in 1855. Thomas and his family later moved to Afton, Minnesota near the city of Stillwater, Minnesota.

According to the Minnesota Legislative Reference Library, Thomas was elected as a member of the Minnesota Senate on October 13, 1857, and was later sworn in on December 7, 1857. Thomas would serve during the 1st Minnesota Legislature from 1857 to 1858. In 1860 Thomas was elected as a member of the Minnesota House of Representatives representing District 2 of the Minnesota House which at the time included Chisago, Kanabec, Pine, and Washington Counties. Thomas would be reelected to his House position in 1861 and would serve in both the 3rd Minnesota Legislature and 4th Minnesota Legislature as a member of the Republican Party of Minnesota. In 1863 following Thomas' political career he was appointed as a commissioner to appraise lands in Minnesota which were owned by the Ho-Chunk (Winnebago).

== Personal life and death ==
Thomas married Charlotte Corday Helm of Mason County, Kentucky, on March 9, 1826. They had four children, one of which was Minor T. Thomas. Thomas died on October 23, 1895, in Galveston, Indiana. He is buried with his family in the Galveston Cemetery.
