= Charles McIlrath =

American politician (1829–1910)

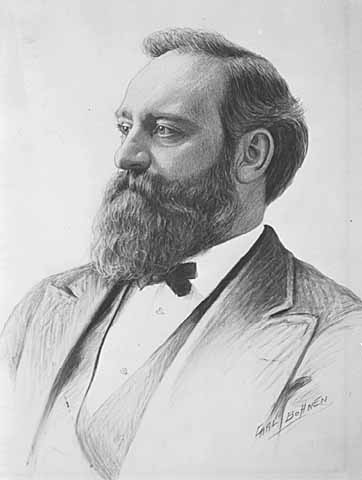
- McIlrath c. 1910 by Carl Bohnen

2nd Auditor of Minnesota
- In office January 1, 1861 – January 13, 1873
- Governor: Alexander Ramsey; Henry Adoniram Swift; Stephen Miller; William Rainey Marshall; Horace Austin
- Preceded by: William F. Dunbar
- Succeeded by: Orlan P. Whitcomb

Personal details
- Born: March 11, 1829 Cleveland, Ohio, U.S.
- Died: January 7, 1910 (aged 80) Berkeley, California, U.S.
- Party: Republican
- Occupation: Politician; Real estate agent

Charles McIlrath (March 11, 1829 – January 7, 1910) was an American politician and real estate dealer who served as the second state auditor of Minnesota from 1861 to 1873 as a member of the Republican Party. In 1874, following his tenure as state auditor, McIlrath was indicted on 26 counts of felony and malfeasance in office.

== Early life ==
McIlrath was born on March 11, 1829, in Cleveland, Ohio.

== Career ==
McIlrath served four terms as the second state auditor of Minnesota, holding office from 1861 to 1873 as a member of the Republican Party.

- In the 1860 Minnesota State Auditor election, McIlrath defeated Democratic Party nominee Herman Trott and Democratic Southern Faction candidate Josiah S. (J.S.) Weiser with more than 62% of the vote.
- In the 1863 Minnesota State Auditor election, McIlrath defeated Democratic nominee John (J.H.) McKinney, a former receiver at the United States General Land Office in Chatfield and Brownsville, with more than 61% of the vote.
- In the 1866 Minnesota State Auditor election, McIlrath defeated Democratic nominee Nelson E. Nelson—a resident of Henderson who served as deputy county auditor of Sibley County, as well as judge of probate and register of deeds—with more than 62% of the vote.
- In the 1869 Minnesota State Auditor election, McIlrath defeated Democratic nominee Louis A. (L.A.) Evans and Temperance Party nominee John (J.S.) Randolph with more than 54% of the vote.

McIlrath's time in office began on January 1, 1861, and concluded on January 13, 1873. He was preceded in office by Democrat William F. Dunbar and succeeded by Republican Orlan P. Whitcomb.

Outside of politics, McIlrath worked as a real estate dealer.

== Legal issues ==
In October 1874, following his tenure as state auditor, McIlrath was indicted by a grand jury of Ramsey County, Minnesota, on 26 counts of "felony and malfeasance in office", two of which charged McIlrath with "felonious entry upon the duties of his office before giving the required bonds and sureties", while the remaining counts charged him with "feloniously selling or granting permits to sell or cut pine timber on various lands specified, without a public auction or sale in any manner, contrary to the statute in such cases made and provided", according to The New York Times. The penalty for each offense was a fine and one year of imprisonment. McIlrath posted $13,000 in bond prior to trial.

== Personal life and death ==
At the time of the 1860 state auditor election, McIlrath was a resident of Oshawa Township in Nicollet County, Minnesota.

McIlrath died in Berkeley, California, on January 7, 1910.

== Electoral history ==
=== 1860 ===
1860 Minnesota State Auditor election
Party	Candidate	Votes	%
Republican	Charles McIlrath	21,464	62.40
Democratic	Herman Trott	12,153	35.33
Democratic Southern Faction	Josiah S. (J.S.) Weiser	779	2.26
Write-in	Cyrus Aldrich	1	0.00
Write-in	Jacob J. (J.J.) Noah	1	0.00
Total votes		34,398	100.00
Republican gain from Democratic			

=== 1863 ===
1863 Minnesota State Auditor election
Party	Candidate	Votes	%
Republican	Charles McIlrath (incumbent)	19,261	61.24
Democratic	John (J.H.) McKinney	12,190	38.76
Total votes		31,451	100.00
Republican hold			

=== 1866 ===
1866 Minnesota State Auditor election
Party	Candidate	Votes	%
Republican	Charles McIlrath (incumbent)	26,362	62.18
Democratic	Nelson E. Nelson	15,979	37.69
Write-in		52	0.12
Total votes		42,393	100.00
Republican hold			

=== 1869 ===
1869 Minnesota State Auditor election
Party	Candidate	Votes	%
Republican	Charles McIlrath (incumbent)	29,552	54.90
Democratic	Louis A. (L.A.) Evans	23,030	42.78
Temperance	John (J.S.) Randolph	1,242	2.31
Write-in		9	0.02
Total votes		53,833	100.00
Republican hold			

Political offices
Preceded by William F. Dunbar	Auditor of Minnesota; 1861–1873	Succeeded by Orlan P. Whitcomb
