= Stiles P. Jones =

American politician (1822–1861)

Stiles P. Jones (November 15, 1822 – September 25, 1861) was an American lawyer and politician.

Jones was born in Barkhamsted, Litchfield County, Connecticut. He moved to Minnesota in 1855 and settled in Rochester, Minnesota with his wife and family. Jones practiced law in Rochester, Minnesota. He served in the Minnesota Senate representing the 12th Senate district until his death in 1861.
