= Dwight and Clara Watson House =

Historic house in Minnesota, United States

- Dwight H. and Clara M. Watson House
- U.S. National Register of Historic Places
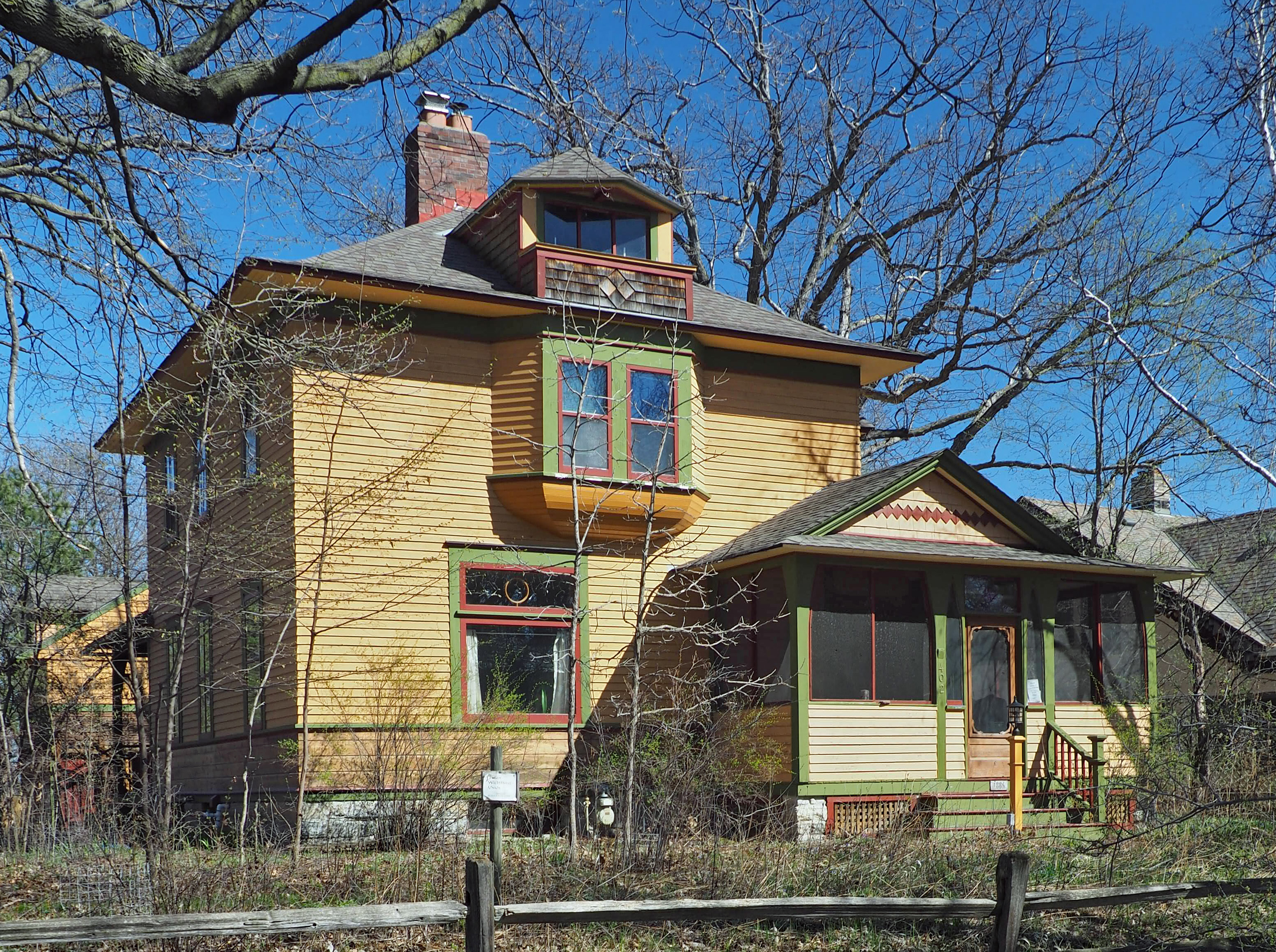
- The Watson House viewed from the northwest

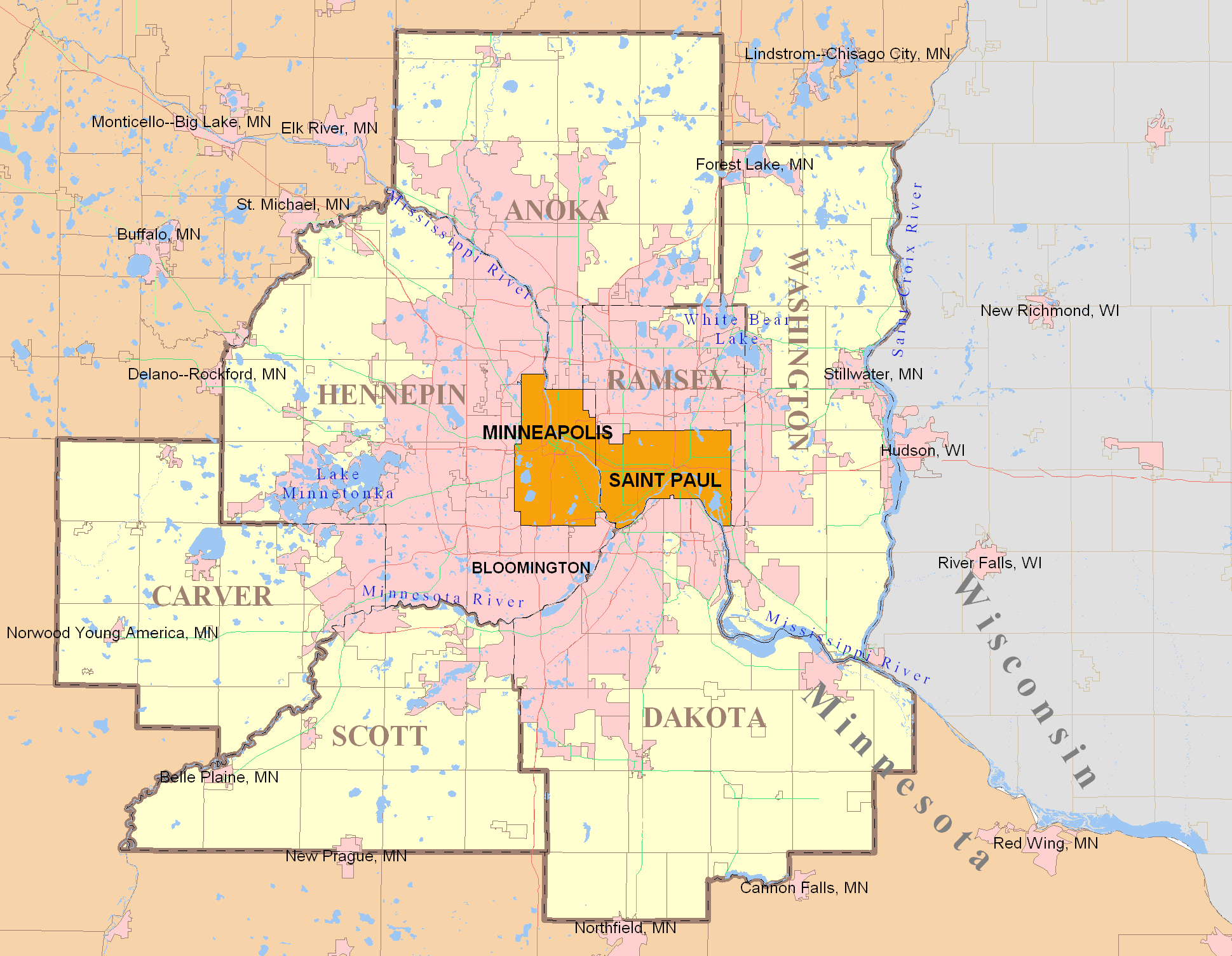
- Location within Minneapolis–Saint Paul Location within Minnesota Location within the United States
- Location: 402 Hall Avenue, Saint Paul, Minnesota
- Coordinates: 44°56′1.5″N 93°5′11″W
- Area: .32 acres (0.13 ha)
- Built: 1886
- Architect: Cass Gilbert
- Architectural style: Late Victorian
- NRHP reference No.: 100004757
- Added to NRHP: December 16, 2019

The Dwight and Clara Watson House is a Victorian home designed by Cass Gilbert in Saint Paul, Minnesota, United States, which is listed on the National Register of Historic Places. It is one of the few surviving early-career works of Gilbert that showcases the detailed and eclectic style of an emerging master architect.

The original owner of the home was Dwight Watson who bought the land and had the house built in 1886. Watson's father, George Watson was a Minnesota state senator.

The original plans for the house were discovered at the New York Historical Society and they bear the name of Cass Gilbert and confirm that he was the original architect.

In 2019 the home was listed on the National Register of Historic Places. In 2023 it was listed as a St. Paul Heritage Preservation Site. The current owner, Mark Thomas, notes its unique design, room layout and exterior. The home is of late Victorian style with a Colonial inspired interior.
