= Oakwood Township, Wabasha County, Minnesota =

Oakwood Township, Minnesota
- Township
- Location within the state of Minnesota Oakwood Township, Minnesota (the United States)
- Coordinates: 44°14′1″N 92°15′46″W
- Country: United States
- State: Minnesota
- County: Wabasha

Area
  - Total: 35.7 sq mi (92.4 km^{2})
  - Land: 35.5 sq mi (91.9 km^{2})
  - Water: 0.19 sq mi (0.5 km^{2})
- Elevation: 1,079 ft (329 m)

Population (2000)
  - Total: 433
  - Density: 12/sq mi (4.7/km^{2})
- Time zone: UTC-6 (Central (CST))
  - Summer (DST): UTC-5 (CDT)
- FIPS code: 27-48022
- GNIS feature ID: 0665195

Oakwood Township is a township in Wabasha County, Minnesota, United States. The population was 433 at the 2000 census.

== History ==
Oakwood Township was originally called Pell Township, for settler John H. Pell, and under the latter name was organized in 1859. After it was discovered there was another township in the state with the name Pell Township, the name was changed in 1872 for the many oak trees within the township's borders.

== Geography ==
According to the United States Census Bureau, the township has a total area of 35.7 square miles (92.4 km^{2}); 35.5 square miles (91.9 km^{2}) of it is land and 0.2 square miles (0.5 km^{2}) of it (0.53%) is water.

== Demographics ==
As of the census of 2000, there were 433 people, 139 households, and 103 families residing in the township. The population density was 12.2 people per square mile (4.7/km^{2}). There were 145 housing units at an average density of 4.1/sq mi (1.6/km^{2}). The racial makeup of the township was 99.54% White, and 0.46% from two or more races. Hispanic or Latino of any race were 0.46% of the population.

There were 139 households, out of which 41.7% had children under the age of 18 living with them, 68.3% were married couples living together, 2.2% had a female householder with no husband present, and 25.2% were non-families. 20.9% of all households were made up of individuals, and 6.5% had someone living alone who was 65 years of age or older. The average household size was 3.12 and the average family size was 3.72.

In the township the population was spread out, with 38.8% under the age of 18, 4.4% from 18 to 24, 30.5% from 25 to 44, 18.7% from 45 to 64, and 7.6% who were 65 years of age or older. The median age was 31 years. For every 100 females, there were 113.3 males. For every 100 females age 18 and over, there were 122.7 males.

The median income for a household in the township was $39,000, and the median income for a family was $47,000. Males had a median income of $31,319 versus $21,635 for females. The per capita income for the township was $15,316. About 8.2% of families and 5.4% of the population were below the poverty line, including 5.2% of those under age 18 and none of those age 65 or over.
