= John H. Pell =

American politician

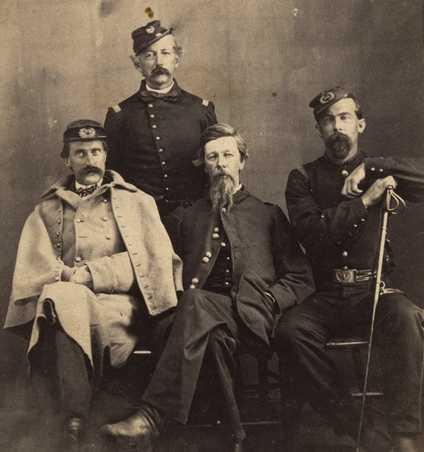
- General Alfred Sully (seated at center) with (left to right) John H. Pell, Andrew J. Levering, and Josias R. King, ca. 1862.
- Born: John Henry Pell; January 1, 1831; New York, U.S.
- Died: February 6, 1902 (aged 71); New York, U.S.
- Military career
- Allegiance: United States of America; Union
- Branch: United States Army; Union Army
- Service years: 1861–1863
- Rank: Captain
- Units: 1st Minnesota Infantry Regiment; Adjutant General Department
- Conflicts: American Civil War: Battle of Bull Run; Battle of the Wilderness; Battle of Antietam

John Henry Pell (January 1, 1831 - February 6, 1902) was an American politician and soldier who served in the Minnesota Senate. During the American Civil War Pell served in the 1st Minnesota Infantry Regiment.

== Early life ==
John Henry Pell was born on January 1, 1831 in New York. Pell first came to Minnesota Territory in 1856 and settled in .

== Politics ==
Pell was elected to the Minnesota Senate on November 6, 1860. He served during the 3rd Minnesota Legislature as a representative of Minnesota's 10th Senate District. At the time the 10th District included only Wabasha County, Minnesota.

== Military service ==
At the outbreak of the American Civil War Pell volunteered for service in the Union Army and was enrolled into the ranks of Company I, the "Wabash Volunteers", from April 29, 1861 to March 26, 1863. Pell was wounded at the Battle of Antietam on September 17, 1862. Pell eventually resigned his commission on March 26, 1863.

Pell later served in the United States Volunteers, Adjutant General Department as a Captain and was the Assistant Adjutant General under Oscar Malmros from May 25, 1863 to May 25, 1865.

== Legacy ==
Pell was the founder of Oakwood Township, Wabasha County, Minnesota, originally named Pell or Pellville. Oakwood was organized on May 11, 1858, the same day that Minnesota was admitted to the Union.
