= Jerry Relph =

American politician (1944–2020)

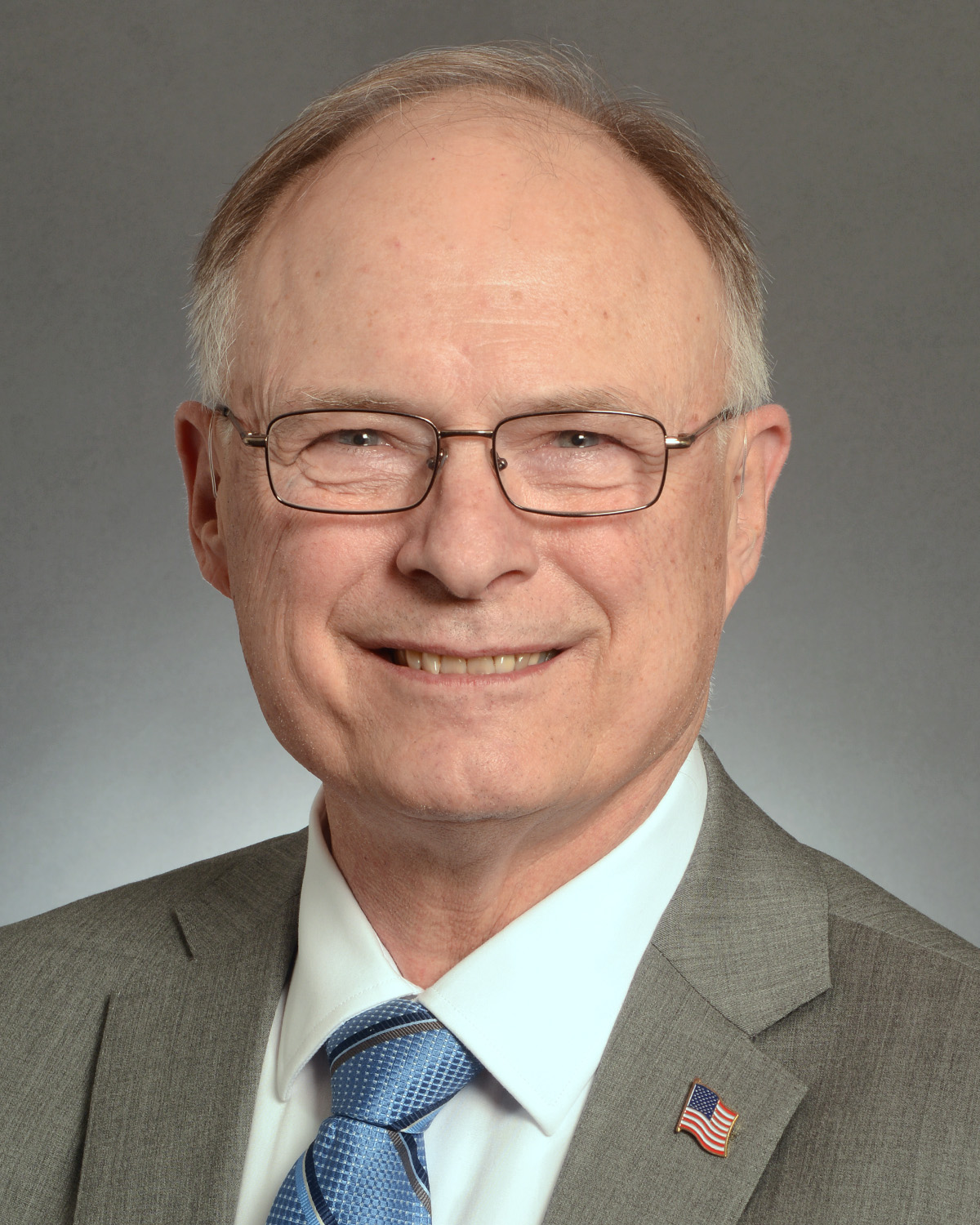

Member of the Minnesota Senate from the 14th district
- In office January 3, 2017 – December 18, 2020
- Preceded by: John Pederson
- Succeeded by: Aric Putnam

Personal details
- Born: September 4, 1944 Boston, Massachusetts, U.S.
- Died: December 18, 2020 (aged 76) Saint Cloud, Minnesota, U.S.
- Party: Republican Party of Minnesota
- Spouse(s): Colette (m. 1972; died 1999) Pegi Broker (m. 2002)
- Children: 2
- Education: Carleton College; William Mitchell College of Law

Jerry O. Relph (September 4, 1944 – December 18, 2020) was an American politician and member of the Minnesota Senate. A Republican, he represented District 14 in central Minnesota from 2017 until his death from COVID-19 complications in 2020. Six weeks before his death, he attended a superspreader event, along with several other Minnesota Republicans, where attendees did not comply with public health recommendations, such as wearing protective face masks.

== Early life, education, and career ==
Relph was born in Boston, Massachusetts, and attended high school in Ann Arbor, Michigan. He attended Carleton College, graduating in 1966 with a Bachelor of Arts degree, and William Mitchell College of Law, graduating in 1974 with a Juris Doctor.

After graduating from Carleton, Relph enlisted in the Marine Corps, spending 14 months in South Vietnam. After that, he worked for 3M in personnel while attending law school. He later joined a small law firm in St. Charles, Minnesota, specializing in municipal, real estate, business, and tax law. In 1984, Relph moved to St. Cloud, Minnesota and joined the Hughes law firm, specializing in municipal and zoning law. He later joined LakeMaster.

== Minnesota Senate ==
In his first run for public office, Relph was elected to the Minnesota Senate in 2016, defeating Democratic–Farmer–Labor candidate Dan Wolgamott by 141 votes. He ran for reelection in 2020, losing to Democratic–Farmer–Labor candidate Aric Putnam. Putnam declared victory a week following the election, with a lead of 315 votes. Relph requested and paid for a recount, which resulted in a gain of two votes for Putnam and three for Relph. Relph never formally conceded the election.

=== Political positions ===
Relph opposed a paid family/sick leave proposal, calling it a "statewide social security system". He opposed universal preschool, calling it a "step to creating cradle to grave control by the government."

In early 2020, Relph expressed concern over COVID-19, arguing the state was inadequately prepared to combat it. He authored legislation, which was signed into law, to provide nearly $2.1 million in aid to fight the pandemic.

== Personal life ==
Relph was married to Colette Relph from 1972 until her death in 1999. They had two children. In 2002, he married Pegi Broker, with whom he had four stepchildren. He lived in St. Cloud.

=== Death ===
Relph was one of several Minnesota Republicans who tested positive for COVID-19 during the COVID-19 pandemic in Minnesota after attending an in-person post-election party on November 5, 2020. At the party, there was little compliance with public health recommendations, such as wearing face masks. He was hospitalized in mid-November.

After weeks of hospitalization, Relph died from complications of the virus on December 18. His daughter, angry at the get-together that preceded his illness, asked, "Why are you throwing a party with 100-plus people in the middle of a pandemic?"
