= Orlan P. Whitcomb =

American farmer and politician

3rd Auditor of Minnesota
- In office 1873–1882
- Preceded by: Charles McIlrath
- Succeeded by: William W. Braden

Personal details
- Born: Orlan Pliny Whitcomb; December 18, 1831 Granville, New York, U.S.
- Died: February 7, 1898 (aged 66) Mankato, Minnesota, U.S.
- Party: Republican
- Occupation: Politician, farmer

Orlan Pliny Whitcomb (December 18, 1831 – February 7, 1898) was an American farmer and politician who served as the third state auditor of Minnesota from 1873 to 1882 as a member of the Republican Party.

Whitcomb was born in Granville, New York. He settled in Rochester, Minnesota Territory on a farm in 1855. He served as county treasurer from 1861 to 1869. Whitcomb served as Minnesota State Auditor from 1873 to 1882. He died in Mankato, Minnesota.

== Electoral history ==
=== 1872 ===
1872 Minnesota State Auditor election
Party	Candidate	Votes	%
Republican	Orlan (O.P.) Whitcomb	51,190	59.48
Democratic	Albert Scheffer	34,817	40.45
Write-in		62	0.07
Total votes		86,069	100.00
Republican hold			

=== 1875 ===
1875 Minnesota State Auditor election
Party	Candidate	Votes	%
Republican	Orlan (O.P.) Whitcomb (incumbent)	45,831	55.01
Democratic	Patrick H. (P.H.) Rahilly	35,994	43.20
Temperance	Asa B. Hutchinson	1,493	1.79
Total votes		83,318	100.00
Republican hold			

=== 1878 ===
1878 Minnesota State Auditor election
Party	Candidate	Votes	%
Republican	Orlan (O.P.) Whitcomb (incumbent)	60,059	55.50
Democratic	Mahlon Black	40,119	37.07
Greenback	Orin H. (O.H.) Page	6,049	5.59
Write-in		1,131	1.05
Prohibition	Theodore G. (T.G.) Carter	856	0.79
Total votes		108,814	100.00
Republican hold			

== Notes ==
Political offices
Preceded by Charles McIlrath	Minnesota State Auditor; 1873 – 1882	Succeeded by William W. Braden
