= 83rd Minnesota Legislature =

2003 to 2004 legislative session

Eighty-third Minnesota Legislature
←	82nd Minnesota Legislature	84th Minnesota Legislature	→
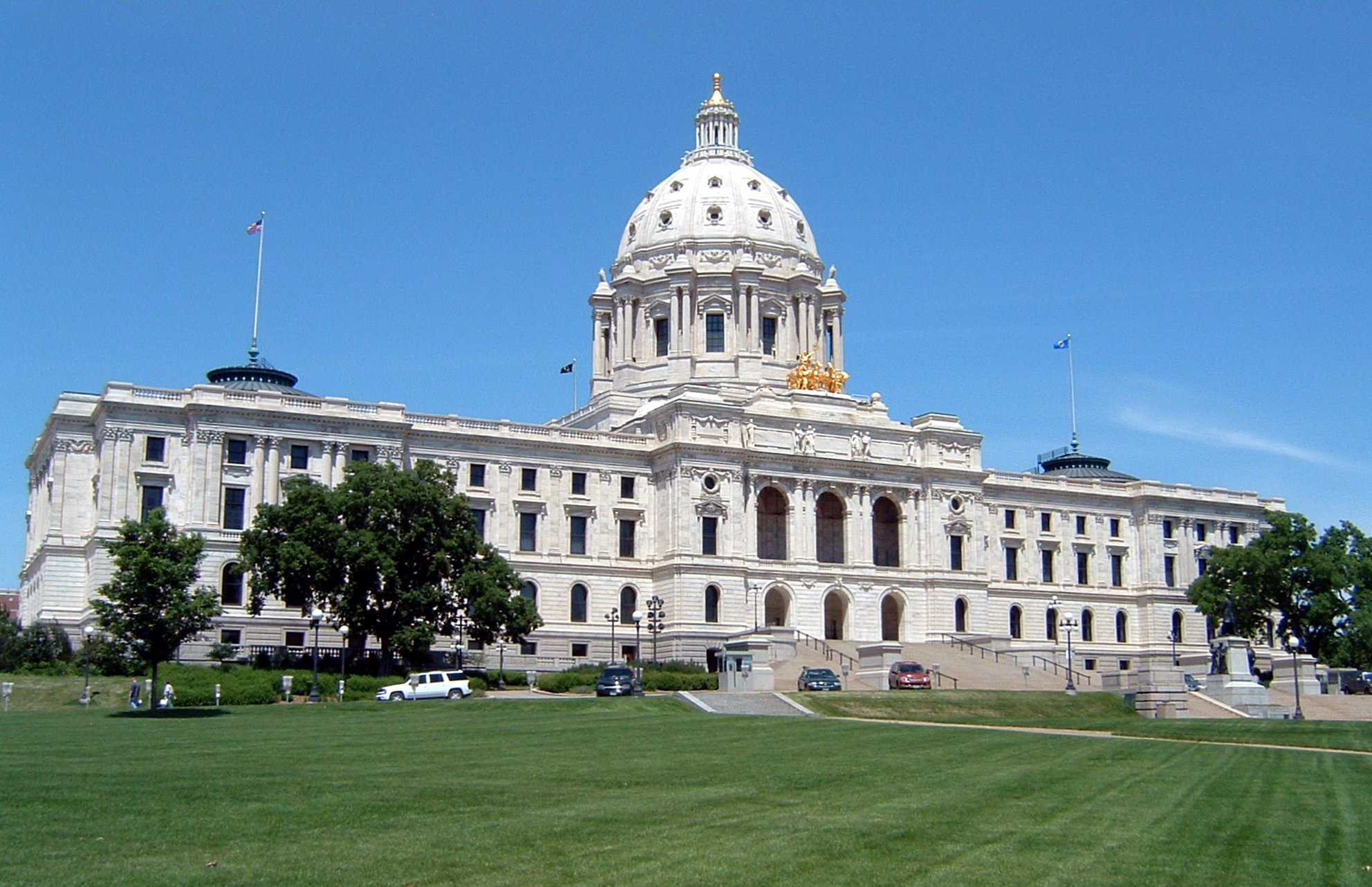

Overview
- Legislative body: Minnesota Legislature
- Jurisdiction: Minnesota, United States
- Meeting place: Minnesota State Capitol
- Term: January 7, 2003 – January 4, 2005
- Election: 2002 General Election
- Website: www.leg.state.mn.us

Minnesota State Senate
- Members: 67 Senators
- President: James Metzen
- Majority Leader: John Hottinger, Dean Johnson
- Minority Leader: Dick Day
- Party control: Democratic-Farmer-Labor Party

Minnesota House of Representatives
- Members: 134 Representatives
- Speaker: Steve Sviggum
- Majority Leader: Erik Paulsen
- Minority Leader: Matt Entenza
- Party control: Republican Party

The eighty-third Minnesota Legislature first convened on January 7, 2003. The 67 members of the Minnesota Senate and the 134 members of the Minnesota House of Representatives were elected during the General Election on November 5, 2002.

== Sessions ==
The legislature met in a regular session from January 7, 2003 to May 19, 2003. A special session began on May 20, 2003 to further discuss budget bills. The special session ended May 29, 2003.

A continuation of the regular session was held between February 2, 2004 and May 16, 2004.

== Party summary ==
Resignations and new members are discussed in the "Membership changes" section, below.

=== Senate ===
	Party (Shading indicates majority caucus)			Total	Vacant
	DFL	IPM	Rep	Total	Vacant
End of previous Legislature	39	2	26	67	0
Begin	35	1	31	67	0
June 29, 2004	35	1	30	66	1
July 21, 2004	35	1	31	67	0
Latest voting share	52%	1%	46%		
Beginning of the next Legislature	35	1	31	67	0

=== House of Representatives ===
	Party (Shading indicates majority caucus)		Total	Vacant
	DFL	Rep	Total	Vacant
End of previous Legislature	63	69	132	2
Begin	52	81	133	1
January 17, 2003	52	80	132	2
January 30, 2003	52	79	131	3
February 10, 2003	52	80	132	2
February 17, 2003	53	80	133	1
March 3, 2003	53	81	134	0
November 24, 2003	53	80	133	1
January 8, 2004	53	81	134	0
June 30, 2004	53	80	133	1
July 21, 2004	53	78	131	3
July 21, 2004	52	77	129	5
Latest voting share	40%	60%		
Beginning of the next Legislature	66	68	134	0

== Leadership ==
=== Senate ===
President of the Senate
James Metzen (DFL-South St. Paul)

Senate Majority Leader
John Hottinger (DFL-Mankato) (2003)
Dean Johnson (DFL-Willmar) (2004)

Senate Minority Leader
Dick Day (R-Owatonna)

=== House of Representatives ===
Speaker of the House
Steve Sviggum (R-Kenyon)

House Majority Leader
Erik Paulsen (R-Eden Prairie)

House Minority Leader
Matt Entenza (DFL-St. Paul)

== Members ==
=== Senate ===
Name	District	City	Party
Anderson, Ellen	66	St. Paul	DFL
Bachmann, Michele	52	Stillwater	Rep
Bakk, Thomas	06	Cook	DFL
Belanger, William	40	Bloomington	Rep
Berglin, Linda	61	Minneapolis	DFL
Betzold, Don	51	Fridley	DFL
Bonoff, Terri	43	Minnetonka	DFL
Chaudhary, Satveer	50	Fridley	DFL
Clark, Tarryl	15	St. Cloud	DFL
Cohen, Dick	64	St. Paul	DFL
Day, Dick	26	Owatonna	Rep
Dibble, D. Scott	60	Minneapolis	DFL
Dille, Steve	18	Dassel	Rep
Fischbach, Michelle	14	Paynesville	Rep
Foley, Leo	47	Coon Rapids	DFL
Frederickson, Dennis	21	New Ulm	Rep
Gerlach, Chris	37	Apple Valley	Rep
Hann, David	42	Eden Prairie	Rep
Higgins, Linda	58	Minneapolis	DFL
Hottinger, John	23	Mankato	DFL
Johnson, Dean	13	Willmar	DFL
Johnson, Debbie	49	Ham Lake	Rep
Jungbauer, Michael	48	East Bethel	Rep
Kelley, Steve	44	Hopkins	DFL
Kierlin, Bob	31	Winona	Rep
Kiscaden, Sheila	30	Rochester	IPM
Koch, Amy	19	Buffalo	Rep
Koering, Paul	12	Fort Ripley	Rep
Kubly, Gary	20	Granite Falls	DFL
Langseth, Keith	09	Glyndon	DFL
Larson, Cal	10	Fergus Falls	Rep
LeClair, Brian	56	Woodbury	Rep
Limmer, Warren	32	Maple Grove	Rep
Lourey, Becky	08	Kerrick	DFL
Marko, Sharon	57	Newport	DFL
Marty, John	54	Roseville	DFL
McGinn, Mike	38	Eagan	Rep
Metzen, James	39	South St. Paul	DFL
Michel, Geoff	41	Edina	Rep
Moua, Mee	67	St. Paul	DFL
Murphy, Steve	28	Red Wing	DFL
Neuville, Thomas	25	Northfield	Rep
Nienow, Sean	17	Cambridge	Rep
Olson, Gen	33	Minnetrista	Rep
Ortman, Julianne	34	Chanhassen	Rep
Pappas, Sandra	65	St. Paul	DFL
Pariseau, Pat	36	Farmington	Rep
Pogemiller, Lawrence	59	Minneapolis	DFL
Ranum, Jane	63	Minneapolis	DFL
Reiter, Mady	53	Shoreview	Rep
Rest, Ann	45	New Hope	DFL
Robling, Claire	35	Jordan	Rep
Rosen, Julie	24	Fairmont	Rep
Ruud, Carrie	04	Breezy Point	Rep
Sams, Dallas	11	Staples	DFL
Saxhaug, Tom	03	Grand Rapids	DFL
Scheid, Linda	46	Brooklyn Park	DFL
Senjem, David	29	Rochester	Rep
Skoe, Rod	02	Clearbrook	DFL
Skoglund, Wes	62	Minneapolis	DFL
Solon, Yvonne Prettner	07	Duluth	DFL
Sparks, Dan	27	Austin	DFL
Stumpf, LeRoy	01	Plummer	DFL
Tomassoni, David J.	05	Chisholm	DFL
Vickerman, Jim	22	Tracy	DFL
Wergin, Betsy	16	Princeton	Rep
Wiger, Chuck	55	North St. Paul	DFL

=== House of Representatives ===
Name	District	City	Party
Abeler, Jim	48B	Anoka	Rep
Adolphson, Peter	42A	Minnetonka	Rep
Anderson, Bruce	19A	Buffalo Township	Rep
Abrams, Ron	43B	Minnetonka	Rep
Anderson, Irv	03A	International Falls	DFL
Anderson, Jeff	27B	Austin, Minnesota	Rep
Atkins, Joe	39B	Inver Grove Heights	DFL
Beard, Michael	35A	Shakopee	Rep
Bernardy, Connie	51B	Fridley	DFL
Biernat, Len	59A	Minneapolis	DFL
Blaine, Greg	12B	Little Falls	Rep
Borrell, Dick	19B	Waverly	Rep
Boudreau, Lynda	26B	Faribault	Rep
Bradley, Fran	29B	Rochester	Rep
Brod, Laura	25A	New Prague	Rep
Buesgens, Mark	35B	Jordan	Rep
Carlson, Lyndon	45B	Crystal	DFL
Clark, Karen	61A	Minneapolis	DFL
Cornish, Tony	24B	Good Thunder	Rep
Cox, Ray	25B	Northfield	Rep
Davids, Gregory	31B	Preston	Rep
Davnie, Jim	62A	Minneapolis	DFL
Dean, Matt	52B	Dellwood	Rep
DeLaForest, Chris	49A	Andover	Rep
Demmer, Randy	29A	Hayfield	Rep
Dempsey, Jerry	28A	Hastings	Rep
Dill, David	06A	Crane Lake	DFL
Dorman, Dan	27A	Albert Lea	Rep
Dorn, John	23B	Mankato	DFL
Eastlund, Rob	17A	Isanti	Rep
Eken, Kent	02A	Twin Valley	DFL
Ellison, Keith	58B	Minneapolis	DFL
Entenza, Matt	64A	St. Paul	DFL
Erhardt, Ron	41A	Edina	Rep
Erickson, Sondra	16A	Princeton	Rep
Finstad, Brad	21B	Comfrey	Rep
Fuller, Doug	04A	Bemidji	Rep
Gerlach, Chris	37A	Apple Valley	Rep
Goodwin, Barbara	50A	Columbia Heights	DFL
Greiling, Mindy	54A	Roseville	DFL
Gunther, Bob	24A	Fairmont	Rep
Haas, Bill	47A	Champlin	Rep
Hackbarth, Tom	48A	Cedar	Rep
Harder, Elaine	22B	Jackson	Rep
Hausman, Alice	66B	St. Paul	DFL
Heidgerken, Bud	13A	Freeport	Rep
Hilstrom, Debra	46B	Brooklyn Center	DFL
Hilty, Bill	08A	Finlayson	DFL
Holberg, Mary Liz	36A	Lakeville	Rep
Holsten, Mark	52B	Stillwater	Rep
Hoppe, Joe	34B	Chaska	Rep
Hornstein, Frank	60B	Minneapolis	DFL
Howes, Larry	04B	Walker	Rep
Huntley, Thomas	07A	Duluth	DFL
Jacobson, Carl	54B	Vadnais Heights	Rep
Jaros, Mike	07B	Duluth	DFL
Johnson, Jeff	43A	Plymouth	Rep
Johnson, Sheldon	67B	St. Paul	DFL
Juhnke, Al	13B	Willmar	DFL
Kahn, Phyllis	59B	Minneapolis	DFL
Kelliher, Margaret Anderson	60A	Minneapolis	DFL
Kielkucki, Tony	18B	Lester Prairie	Rep
Klinzing, Karen	56B	Woodbury	Rep
Knoblach, Jim	15A	St. Cloud	Rep
Koenen, Lyle	20B	Clara City	DFL
Kohls, Paul	34A	Victoria	Rep
Krinkie, Philip	53A	Shoreview	Rep
Kuisle, Bill	30B	Rochester	Rep
Lanning, Morrie	09A	Moorhead	Rep
Larson, Dan	63B	Bloomington	DFL
Latz, Ron	44B	St. Louis Park	DFL
Lenczewski, Ann	40B	Bloomington	DFL
Lesch, John	66A	St. Paul	DFL
Lieder, Bernard	01B	Crookston	DFL
Lindgren, Doug	02B	Bagley	Rep
Lindner, Arlon	32A	Corcoran	Rep
Lipman, Eric	56A	Lake Elmo	Rep
Magnus, Doug	22A	Slayton	Rep
Mahoney, Tim	67A	St. Paul	DFL
Mariani, Carlos	65B	St. Paul	DFL
Marquart, Paul	09B	Dilworth	DFL
McElroy, Dan	40A	Burnsville	Rep
McNamara, Denny	57B	Hastings	Rep
Meslow, Doug	53B	White Bear Lake	Rep
Mullery, Joe	58A	Minneapolis	DFL
Murphy, Mary	06B	Hermantown	DFL
Nelson, Carla	30A	Rochester	Rep
Nelson, Michael	46A	Brooklyn Park	DFL
Nelson, Peter	17B	Lindstrom	Rep
Newman, Scott	18A	Hutchinson	Rep
Nornes, Bud	10A	Fergus Falls	DFL
Olson, Mark	16B	Big Lake	Rep
Opatz, Joe	15B	St. Cloud	DFL
Osterman, Lynne	45A	New Hope	Rep
Otremba, Mary Ellen	11B	Long Prairie	DFL
Otto, Rebecca	52B	Marine on St. Croix	DFL
Ozment, Dennis	37B	Rosemount	Rep
Paulsen, Erik	42B	Eden Prairie	Rep
Paymar, Michael	64B	St. Paul	DFL
Pelowski, Gene	31A	Winona	DFL
Penas, Maxine	01A	Badger	Rep
Peterson, Aaron	20A	Appleton	DFL
Powell, Duke	40A	Burnsville	Rep
Pugh, Thomas	39A	South St. Paul	Rep
Rhodes, Jim	44A	St. Louis Park	Rep
Rukavina, Tom	05A	Virginia	DFL
Ruth, Connie	26A	Owatonna	Rep
Samuelson, Char	50B	New Brighton	Rep
Seagren, Alice	41B	Bloomington	Rep
Seifert, Marty	21A	Marshall	Rep
Sertich, Tony	05B	Chisholm	DFL
Severson, Dan	14A	Sauk Rapids	Rep
Sieben, Katie	57A	Newport	DFL
Simpson, Dean	10B	Perham	Rep
Slawik, Nora	55B	Maplewood	Rep
Smith, Steve	33A	Mound	Rep
Soderstrom, Judy	08B	Mora	Rep
Solberg, Loren	03B	Grand Rapids	DFL
Stanek, Rich	32B	Maple Grove	Rep
Stang, Doug	14B	Cold Spring	Rep
Strachan, Steve	36B	Farmington	Rep
Sviggum, Steve	28B	Kenyon	Rep
Swenson, Howard	23A	Nicollet	Rep
Sykora, Barb	33B	Excelsior	Rep
Thao, Cy	65A	St. Paul	DFL
Thissen, Paul	63A	Minneapolis	DFL
Tingelstad, Kathy	49B	Andover	Rep
Urdahl, Dean	18B	Grove City	Rep
Vandeveer, Ray	52A	Forest Lake	Rep
Wagenius, Jean	62B	Minneapolis	DFL
Walker, Neva	61B	Minneapolis	DFL
Walz, Dale	12A	Brainerd	Rep
Wardlow, Lynn	38B	Eagan	Rep
Wasiluk, Scott	55A	Maplewood	DFL
Westerberg, Andy	51A	Blaine	Rep
Westrom, Torrey	11A	Elbow Lake	Rep
Wilkin, Tim	38A	Eagan	Rep
Zellers, Kurt	32B	Maple Grove	Rep

== Membership changes ==
=== Senate ===
District	Vacated by	Reason for change	Successor	Date successor seated
37	David Knutson (R)	Resigned June 29, 2004 to accept appointment to district judgeship.	Chris Gerlach (R)	July 21, 2004

=== House of Representatives ===
District	Vacated by	Reason for change	Successor	Date successor seated
40A	Vacant seat	Dan Elroy (R) resigned to accept appointment as Commissioner of Finance on November 15, 2002, after having won re-election. Seat was vacant when the 83rd Legislature convened.	Duke Powell (R)	February 10, 2003
52B	Mark Holsten (R)	Resigned January 17, 2003 to accept appointment as Deputy Commissioner of Natural Resources.	Rebecca Otto (DFL)	February 17, 2003
32B	Rich Stanek (R)	Resigned January 30, 2003 to accept appointment as Commissioner of Public Safety.	Kurt Zellers (R)	March 3, 2003
18A	Tony Kielkucki (R)	Resigned November 24, 2003.	Scott Newman (R)	January 8, 2004
14B	Doug Stang (R)	Resigned June 30, 2004 to accept appointment as assistant Health Department commissioner.	Remained vacant	
37A	Chris Gerlach (R)	Elected to the Senate on July 21, 2004 special election.	Remained vacant	
56A	Eric Lipman (R)	Resigned July 21, 2004 to become the state sex-offender policy coordinator.	Remained vacant	
39A	Tom Pugh (DFL)	Resigned August 31, 2004 to accept appointment to the Minnesota Public Utilities Commission.	Remained vacant	
41B	Alice Seagren (R)	Resigned August 31, 2004 to accept appointment to be the Education Commissioner.	Remained vacant	

== Notes ==
Preceded by Eighty-second Minnesota Legislature	Eighty-third Minnesota Legislature; 2003—2005	Succeeded by Eighty-fourth Minnesota Legislature
