= 84th Minnesota Legislature =

2005 to 2006 legislative session

Eighty-fourth Minnesota Legislature
←	83rd Minnesota Legislature	85th Minnesota Legislature	→
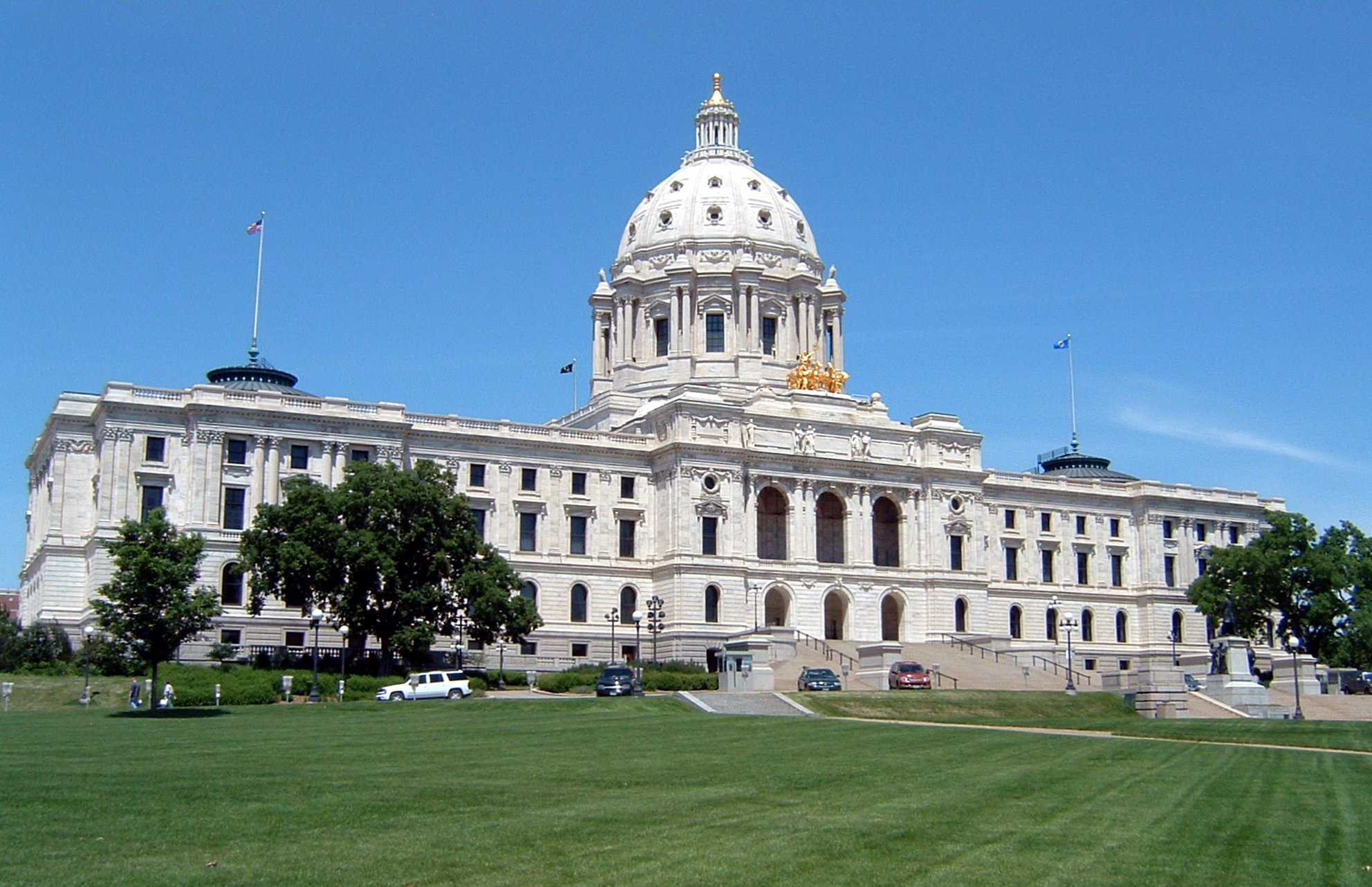

Overview
- Legislative body: Minnesota Legislature
- Jurisdiction: Minnesota, United States
- Meeting place: Minnesota State Capitol
- Term: January 4, 2005 – January 3, 2007
- Election: 2004 General Election

Minnesota State Senate
- Members: 67 Senators
- President: James Metzen
- Majority Leader: Dean Johnson
- Minority Leader: Dick Day
- Party control: Democratic-Farmer-Labor Party

Minnesota House of Representatives
- Members: 134 Representatives
- Speaker: Steve Sviggum
- Majority Leader: Erik Paulsen
- Minority Leader: Matt Entenza
- Party control: Republican Party

The eighty-fourth Minnesota Legislature first convened on January 4, 2005. The 67 members of the Minnesota Senate were elected during the General Election on November 5, 2002, while the 134 members of the Minnesota House of Representatives were elected during the General Election on November 2, 2004.

== Sessions ==
The legislature met in a regular session from January 4, 2005 to May 23, 2005. It ended without a passage of an overall budget, and a special session was opened May 24, 2005. No overall budget passed by the end of the fiscal year on June 30, and much of the state government shut down for the first time in history, though some essential services remained in operation, and some departments received funding in legislation. On July 9, 2005, a budget was agreed upon, and the special session ended a few days later on July 13, 2005.

A continuation of the regular session was held between March 1, 2006 and May 21, 2006.

== Party summary ==
Resignations and new members are discussed in the "Membership changes" section, below.

=== Senate ===
	Party (Shading indicates majority caucus)			Total	Vacant
	DFL	IPM	Rep	Total	Vacant
End of previous Legislature	35	1	31	67	0
Begin	35	1	31	67	0
September 21, 2005	35	1	30	66	1
November 21, 2005	35	1	29	65	2
December 7, 2005	36	1	29	66	1
December 31, 2005	36	1	28	65	2
January 5, 2006	36	1	29	66	1
January 6, 2006	37	1	29	67	0
January 6, 2006	38	0	29	67	0
Latest voting share	57%	0%	43%		
Beginning of the next Legislature	44	0	23	67	0

=== House of Representatives ===
	Party (Shading indicates majority caucus)		Total	Vacant
	DFL	Rep	Total	Vacant
End of previous Legislature	52	77	129	5
Begin	66	68	134	0
December 12, 2005	65	68	133	1
December 27, 2005	66	68	134	0
June 21, 2006	66	67	133	1
Latest voting share	50%	50%		
Beginning of the next Legislature	85	49	134	0

== Leadership ==
=== Senate ===
President of the Senate
James Metzen (DFL-South St. Paul)

Senate Majority Leader
Dean Johnson (DFL-Willmar)

Senate Minority Leader
Dick Day (R-Owatonna)

=== House of Representatives ===
Speaker of the House
Steve Sviggum (R-Kenyon)

House Majority Leader
Erik Paulsen (R-Eden Prairie)

House Minority Leader
Matt Entenza (DFL-St. Paul)

== Members ==
=== Senate ===
Name	District	City	Party
Anderson, Ellen	66	St. Paul	DFL
Bachmann, Michele	52	Stillwater	Rep
Bakk, Thomas	06	Cook	DFL
Belanger, William	40	Bloomington	Rep
Berglin, Linda	61	Minneapolis	DFL
Betzold, Don	51	Fridley	DFL
Bonoff, Terri	43	Minnetonka	DFL
Chaudhary, Satveer	50	Fridley	DFL
Clark, Tarryl	15	St. Cloud	DFL
Cohen, Dick	64	St. Paul	DFL
Day, Dick	26	Owatonna	Rep
Dibble, D. Scott	60	Minneapolis	DFL
Dille, Steve	18	Dassel	Rep
Fischbach, Michelle	14	Paynesville	Rep
Foley, Leo	47	Coon Rapids	DFL
Frederickson, Dennis	21	New Ulm	Rep
Gerlach, Chris	37	Apple Valley	Rep
Hann, David	42	Eden Prairie	Rep
Higgins, Linda	58	Minneapolis	DFL
Hottinger, John	23	Mankato	DFL
Johnson, Dean	13	Willmar	DFL
Johnson, Debbie	49	Ham Lake	Rep
Jungbauer, Michael	48	East Bethel	Rep
Kelley, Steve	44	Hopkins	DFL
Kierlin, Bob	31	Winona	Rep
Kiscaden, Sheila	30	Rochester	DFL
Koch, Amy	19	Buffalo	Rep
Koering, Paul	12	Fort Ripley	Rep
Kubly, Gary	20	Granite Falls	DFL
Langseth, Keith	09	Glyndon	DFL
Larson, Cal	10	Fergus Falls	Rep
LeClair, Brian	56	Woodbury	Rep
Limmer, Warren	32	Maple Grove	Rep
Lourey, Becky	08	Kerrick	DFL
Marko, Sharon	57	Newport	DFL
Marty, John	54	Roseville	DFL
McGinn, Mike	38	Eagan	Rep
Metzen, James	39	South St. Paul	DFL
Michel, Geoff	41	Edina	Rep
Moua, Mee	67	St. Paul	DFL
Murphy, Steve	28	Red Wing	DFL
Neuville, Thomas	25	Northfield	Rep
Nienow, Sean	17	Cambridge	Rep
Olson, Gen	33	Minnetrista	Rep
Ortman, Julianne	34	Chanhassen	Rep
Pappas, Sandra	65	St. Paul	DFL
Pariseau, Pat	36	Farmington	Rep
Pogemiller, Lawrence	59	Minneapolis	DFL
Ranum, Jane	63	Minneapolis	DFL
Reiter, Mady	53	Shoreview	Rep
Rest, Ann	45	New Hope	DFL
Robling, Claire	35	Jordan	Rep
Rosen, Julie	24	Fairmont	Rep
Ruud, Carrie	04	Breezy Point	Rep
Sams, Dallas	11	Staples	DFL
Saxhaug, Tom	03	Grand Rapids	DFL
Scheid, Linda	46	Brooklyn Park	DFL
Senjem, David	29	Rochester	Rep
Skoe, Rod	02	Clearbrook	DFL
Skoglund, Wes	62	Minneapolis	DFL
Solon, Yvonne Prettner	07	Duluth	DFL
Sparks, Dan	27	Austin	DFL
Stumpf, LeRoy	01	Plummer	DFL
Tomassoni, David J.	05	Chisholm	DFL
Vickerman, Jim	22	Tracy	DFL
Wergin, Betsy	16	Princeton	Rep
Wiger, Chuck	55	North St. Paul	DFL

=== House of Representatives ===
Name	District	City	Party
Abeler, Jim	48B	Anoka	Rep
Anderson, Bruce	19A	Buffalo Township	Rep
Abrams, Ron	43B	Minnetonka	Rep
Anderson, Irv	03A	International Falls	DFL
Atkins, Joe	39B	Inver Grove Heights	DFL
Beard, Michael	35A	Shakopee	Rep
Bernardy, Connie	51B	Fridley	DFL
Blaine, Greg	12B	Little Falls	Rep
Bradley, Fran	29B	Rochester	Rep
Brod, Laura	25A	New Prague	Rep
Buesgens, Mark	35B	Jordan	Rep
Carlson, Lyndon	45B	Crystal	DFL
Charron, Mike	56A	Woodbury	Rep
Clark, Karen	61A	Minneapolis	DFL
Cornish, Tony	24B	Good Thunder	Rep
Cox, Ray	25B	Northfield	Rep
Cybart, Lloyd	37A	Apple Valley	Rep
Davids, Gregory	31B	Preston	Rep
Davnie, Jim	62A	Minneapolis	DFL
Dean, Matt	52B	Dellwood	Rep
DeLaForest, Chris	49A	Andover	Rep
Demmer, Randy	29A	Hayfield	Rep
Dempsey, Jerry	28A	Hastings	Rep
Dill, David	06A	Crane Lake Township	DFL
Dittrich, Denise	47A	Champlin	DFL
Dorman, Dan	27A	Albert Lea	Rep
Dorn, John	23B	Mankato	DFL
Eastlund, Rob	17A	Isanti	Rep
Eken, Kent	02A	Twin Valley	DFL
Ellison, Keith	58B	Minneapolis	DFL
Emmer, Tom	19B	Delano	Rep
Matt Entenza	64A	St. Paul	DFL
Erhardt, Ron	41A	Edina	Rep
Erickson, Sondra	16A	Princeton	Rep
Finstad, Brad	21B	Comfrey	Rep
Fritz, Patti	26B	Faribault	DFL
Garofalo, Pat	36B	Farmington	Rep
Gazelka, Paul	12A	Brainerd	Rep
Goodwin, Barbara	50A	Columbia Heights	DFL
Greiling, Mindy	54A	Roseville	DFL
Gunther, Bob	24A	Fairmont	Rep
Hackbarth, Tom	48A	Cedar	Rep
Hamilton, Rod	22B	Mountain Lake	Rep
Hansen, Rick	39A	South St. Paul	DFL
Hausman, Alice	66B	St. Paul	DFL
Haws, Larry	15B	St. Cloud	DFL
Heidgerken, Bud	13A	Freeport	Rep
Hilstrom, Debra	46B	Brooklyn Center	DFL
Hilty, Bill	08A	Finlayson	DFL
Holberg, Mary Liz	36A	Lakeville	Rep
Hoppe, Joe	34B	Chaska	Rep
Hornstein, Frank	60B	Minneapolis	DFL
Hortman, Melissa	47B	Brooklyn Park	DFL
Hosch, Larry	14B	St. Joseph	DFL
Howes, Larry	04B	Walker	Rep
Huntley, Thomas	07A	Duluth	DFL
Jaros, Mike	07B	Duluth	DFL
Johnson, Jeff	43A	Plymouth	Rep
Johnson, Ruth	23A	St. Peter	DFL
Johnson, Sheldon	67B	St. Paul	DFL
Juhnke, Al	13B	Willmar	DFL
Kahn, Phyllis	59B	Minneapolis	DFL
Kelliher, Margaret Anderson	60A	Minneapolis	DFL
Klinzing, Karen	56B	Woodbury	Rep
Knoblach, Jim	15A	St. Cloud	Rep
Koenen, Lyle	20B	Clara City	DFL
Kohls, Paul	34A	Victoria	Rep
Krinkie, Philip	53A	Shoreview	Rep
Lanning, Morrie	09A	Moorhead	Rep
Larson, Dan	63B	Bloomington	DFL
Latz, Ron	44B	St. Louis Park	DFL
Lenczewski, Ann	40B	Bloomington	DFL
Lesch, John	66A	St. Paul	DFL
Liebling, Tina	30A	Rochester	DFL
Lieder, Bernard	01B	Crookston	DFL
Lillie, Leon	55A	North St. Paul	DFL
Loeffler, Diane	59A	Minneapolis	DFL
Magnus, Doug	22A	Slayton	Rep
Mahoney, Tim	67A	St. Paul	DFL
Mariani, Carlos	65B	St. Paul	DFL
Marquart, Paul	09B	Dilworth	DFL
McNamara, Denny	57B	Hastings	Rep
Meslow, Doug	53B	White Bear Lake	Rep
Moe, Frank	04A	Bemidji	DFL
Mullery, Joe	58A	Minneapolis	DFL
Murphy, Mary	06B	Hermantown	DFL
Nelson, Michael	46A	Brooklyn Park	DFL
Nelson, Peter	17B	Lindstrom	Rep
Newman, Scott	18A	Hutchinson	Rep
Nornes, Bud	10A	Fergus Falls	Rep
Olson, Mark	16B	Big Lake	Rep
Otremba, Mary Ellen	11B	Long Prairie	DFL
Ozment, Dennis	37B	Rosemount	Rep
Paulsen, Erik	42B	Eden Prairie	Rep
Paymar, Michael	64B	St. Paul	DFL
Pelowski, Gene	31A	Winona	DFL
Penas, Maxine	01A	Badger	Rep
Peppin, Joyce	32A	Rogers	Rep
Peterson, Aaron	20A	Appleton	DFL
Peterson, Neil W.	41B	Bloomington	Rep
Peterson, Sandra	45A	New Hope	DFL
Poppe, Jeanne	27B	Austin	DFL
Powell, Duke	40A	Burnsville	Rep
Rukavina, Tom	05A	Virginia	DFL
Ruth, Connie	26A	Owatonna	Rep
Ruud, Maria	42A	Minnetonka	DFL
Sailer, Brita	02B	Park Rapids	DFL
Samuelson, Char	50B	New Brighton	Rep
Scalze, Bev	54B	Little Canada	DFL
Seifert, Marty	21A	Marshall	Rep
Sertich, Tony	05B	Chisholm	DFL
Severson, Dan	14A	Sauk Rapids	Rep
Sieben, Katie	57A	Newport	DFL
Simon, Steve	44A	St. Louis Park	DFL
Simpson, Dean	10B	Perham	Rep
Slawik, Nora	55B	Maplewood	Rep
Smith, Steve	33A	Mound	Rep
Soderstrom, Judy	08B	Mora	Rep
Solberg, Loren	03B	Grand Rapids	DFL
Sviggum, Steve	28B	Kenyon	Rep
Sykora, Barb	33B	Excelsior	Rep
Thao, Cy	65A	St. Paul	DFL
Thissen, Paul	63A	Minneapolis	DFL
Tingelstad, Kathy	49B	Andover	Rep
Urdahl, Dean	18B	Grove City	Rep
Vandeveer, Ray	52A	Forest Lake	Rep
Wagenius, Jean	62B	Minneapolis	DFL
Walker, Neva	61B	Minneapolis	DFL
Wardlow, Lynn	38B	Eagan	Rep
Welti, Andy	30B	Plainview	DFL
Westerberg, Andy	51A	Blaine	Rep
Westrom, Torrey	11A	Elbow Lake	Rep
Wilkin, Tim	38A	Eagan	Rep
Zellers, Kurt	32B	Maple Grove	Rep

== Membership changes ==
=== Senate ===
District	Vacated by	Reason for change	Successor	Date successor seated
43	David Gaither (R)	Resigned September 21, 2005 to become Governor Tim Pawlenty's chief of staff.	Terri Bonoff (DFL)	December 7, 2005
15	Dave Kleis (R)	Resigned November 21, 2005 to become mayor of St. Cloud.	Tarryl Clark (DFL)	January 6, 2006
19	Mark Ourada (R)	Resigned December 31, 2005.	Amy Koch (R)	January 5, 2006

=== House of Representatives ===
District	Vacated by	Reason for change	Successor	Date successor seated
15B	Joe Opatz (DFL)	Resigned December 12, 2005 to become interim president of Central Lakes College.	Larry Haws (DFL)	January 19, 2006
43B	Ron Abrams (R)	Resigned June 21, 2006 to accept appointment to judgeship.	Remained vacant	

Preceded by Eighty-third Minnesota Legislature	Eighty-fourth Minnesota Legislature; 2005—2007	Succeeded by Eighty-fifth Minnesota Legislature
