= List of special elections to the Minnesota House of Representatives =

This is a list of special elections to the Minnesota House of Representatives. Such elections are called by the governor of Minnesota to fill vacancies that occur when a member of the Minnesota House of Representatives dies or resigns before the biennial general election. Winners of these elections serve the remainder of the term and are usually candidates in the next election for their districts.

General elections are held in November of even numbered years. New Legislatures convene on the first Tuesday following the first Monday of the following year.

== Special elections ==
District	Legislature	Date	Predecessor	Successor	Cause
66A	66th	April 8, 1969	Marvin E. Christianson Sr. (DFL)	Donna Jean Christianson (DFL)	Death.
26A	79th	August 1, 1995	Gene Hugoson (R)	Bob Gunther (R)	
11B	80th	November 7, 1997	Ken Otremba (DFL)	Mary Ellen Otremba (DFL)	Death (cancer).
17A	80th	January 6, 1998	LeRoy Koppendrayer (R)	Sondra Erickson (R)	Resigned to become a member of the Minnesota Public Utilities Commission.
23A	80th	January 20, 1998	Barb Vickerman (R)	James Clark (R)	
51B	80th	January 27, 1998	Doug Swenson (R)	Ray Vanderveer (R)	
7A	81st	November 2, 1999	Willard Munger (DFL)	Dale Swapinski (DFL)	Death (liver cancer).
12B	82nd	November 6, 2001	Steve Wenzel (DFL)	Greg Blaine (R)	Resigned to become State Director of Rural Development in the United States Department of Agriculture.
47A	82nd	March 4, 2002	Darlene Luther (DFL)	John Jordan (R)	Death (stomach cancer).
40A	83rd	February 3, 2003	Dan McElroy (R)	Duke Powell (R)	Resigned to become Commissioner of the Minnesota Department of Finance.
52B	83rd	February 11, 2003	Mark Holsten (R)	Rebecca Otto (DFL)	Resigned to become Deputy Commissioner of Natural Resources.
32B	83rd	February 25, 2003	Rich Stanek (R)	Kurt Zellers (R)	Resigned to become Sheriff of Hennepin County.
18A	83rd	December 30, 2003	Tony Kielkucki (R)	Scott Newman (R)	Resigned following appointment to a position in the Minnesota Secretary of State's Office.
15B	84th	December 27, 2005	Joe Opatz (DFL)	Larry Haws (DFL)	Resigned to become Interim President of Central Lakes College.
28B	85th	August 7, 2007	Steve Swiggum (R)	Steve Drazkowski (R)	Resigned to become Minnesota Commissioner of Labor and Industry.
5B	87th	February 15, 2011	Tony Sertich (DFL)	Carly Melin (DFL)	Resigned following appointment to Commissioner of Iron Range Resources and Rehabilitation Board.
61B	87th	January 10, 2012	Jeff Hayden (DFL)	Susan Allen (DFL)	Resigned following election to Minnesota Senate.
14A	88th	February 12, 2013	Steve Gottwalt (R)	Tama Theis (R)	Resigned to become the director of state legislative policy for the Center for Diagnostic Imaging.
19A	88th	February 12, 2013	Terry Morrow (DFL)	Clark Johnson (DFL)	Resigned to become the legislative director for the Uniform Law Commission.
46A	89th	November 3, 2015	Ryan Winkler (DFL)	Peggy Flanagan (DFL)	Resigned to relocate to Belgium.
3A	89th	December 8, 2015	David Dill (DFL)	Rob Ecklund (DFL)	Death (cancer).
50B	89th	February 9, 2016	Ann Lenczewski (DFL)	Chad Anderson (R)	Resigned to join Lockridge Grindal Nauen P.L.L.P.
32B	90th	February 14, 2017	Bob Barrett (R)	Anne Neu (R)	Ruled ineligible to be a candidate in the 2016 general election by the Minnesota Supreme Court.
23B	90th	February 12, 2018	Tony Cornish (R)	Jeremy Munson (R)	Resigned due to allegations of sexual harassment.
11B	91st	March 19, 2019	Jason Rarick (R)	Nathan Nelson (R)	Resigned after winning a special election to the Minnesota Senate.
60A	91st	February 4, 2020	Diane Loeffler (DFL)	Sydney Jordan (DFL)	Death (cancer).
30A	91st	February 4, 2020	Nick Zerwas (R)	Paul Novotny (R)	Resigned to spend more time with his family and to seek employment outside of the Legislature.
52B	93rd	December 5, 2023	Ruth Richardson (DFL)	Bianca Virnig (DFL)	Resigned to focus on role at Planned Parenthood.
27B	93rd	March 19, 2024	Kurt Daudt (R)	Bryan Lawrence (R)	Resigned.
40B	94th	March 11, 2025	Jamie Becker-Finn (DFL)	David Gottfried (DFL)	Becker-Finn did not seek re-election in November. Curtis Johnson, elected to represent the district in the November 2024 election, was ruled ineligible to serve due to residency requirements.
34B	94th	September 16, 2025	Melissa Hortman (DFL)	Xp Lee (DFL)	Hortman was assassinated on June 14, 2025.

== See also ==
- List of special elections to the Minnesota Senate
