= Senator Hottinger =

Senator Hottinger may refer to:

- Jay Hottinger (born 1969), Ohio State Senate
- John Hottinger (born 1945), Minnesota State Senate
