= Eileen Tompkins =

American politician

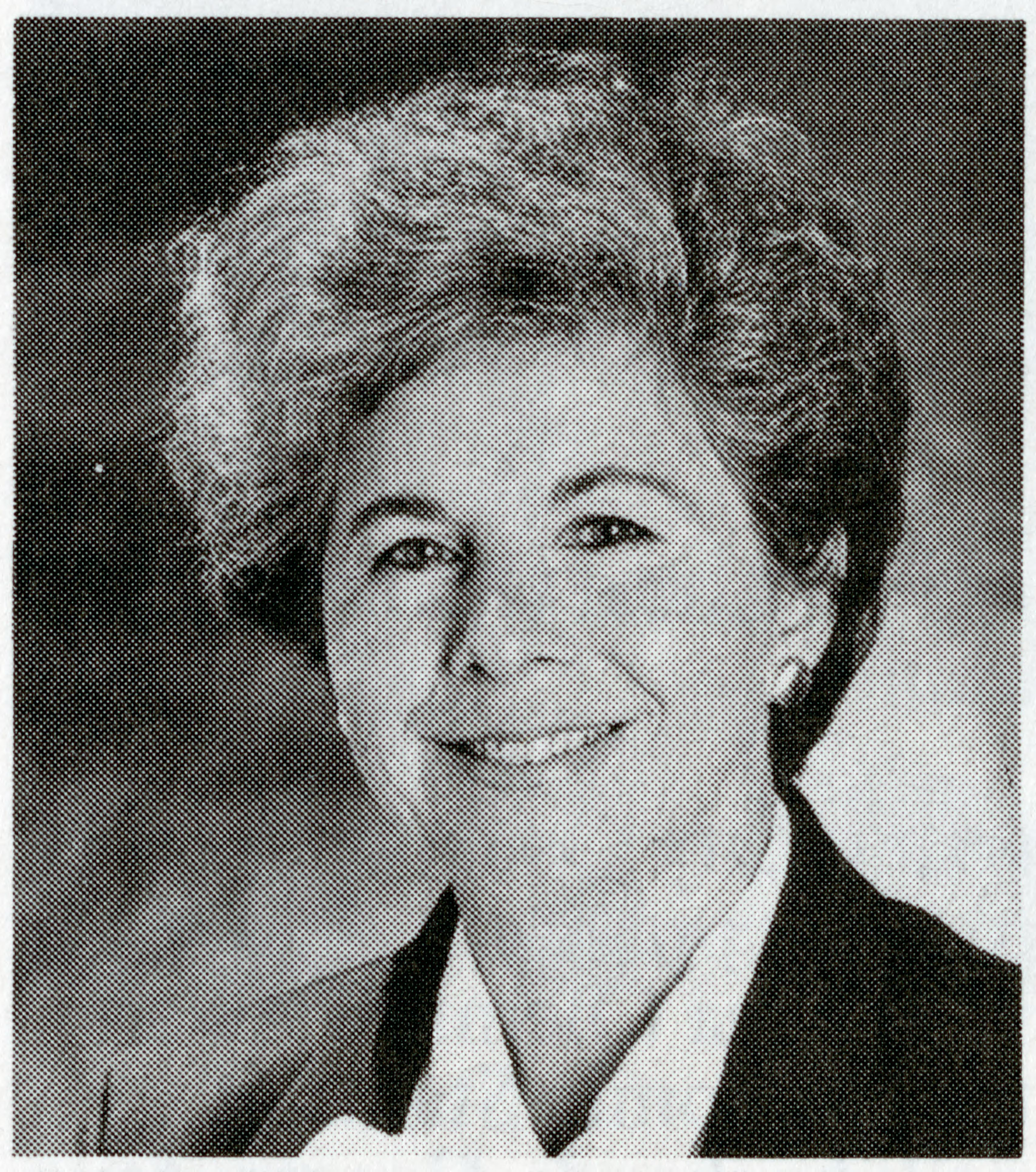

Member of the Minnesota House of Representatives from district 36A
- In office January 5, 1993 – January 4, 1999
- Preceded by: Becky Kelso
- Succeeded by: Chris Gerlach

Member of the Minnesota House of Representatives from district 37A
- In office January 8, 1985 – January 4, 1993
- Preceded by: Carolyn Jane Rodriguez
- Succeeded by: Dennis Ozment

Personal details
- Born: December 17, 1933 (age 92)
- Party: Republican

Eileen Tompkins (born December 17, 1933) is an American politician who served in the Minnesota House of Representatives from 1985 to 1999.
