= Mark Douglas Olson =

American politician

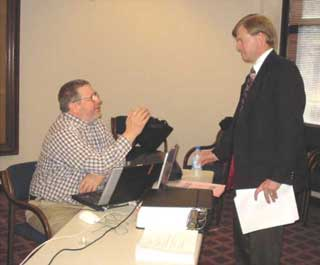

Member of the Minnesota House of Representatives from District 16B
- In office January 5, 1993 – January 7, 2003
- Preceded by: Jim Knoblach
- Succeeded by: Mary Kiffmeyer

Member of the Minnesota House of Representatives from District 19A
- In office January 7, 2003 – January 5, 2009
- Preceded by: Harold F. Lasley
- Succeeded by: Bruce Anderson

Personal details
- Born: July 1, 1955 (age 71) Sherburne County, Minnesota, U.S.
- Party: Republican (until 2007), Independent Republican (since 2007)
- Profession: Carpenter, politician

Mark Douglas Olson was an American politician who served as a member of the Minnesota House of Representatives from district 16B, first elected in 1992. After his re-election in 2006, Olson was arrested and subsequently convicted of domestic assault. Olson left the legislature 2009 after failing to win a special election for a vacant seat in the Minnesota Senate.

== Early life and education ==
Olson was born and raised on a farm in Sherburne County, Minnesota and resided in Big Lake, Minnesota during his tenure in the state legislature. He graduated from Becker High School and received carpentry training at Wright Technical Center in Buffalo, Minnesota.

== Career ==
He was a carpenter and log home builder for over 25 years. Olson previously served on the Monticello-Big Lake Hospital Ethics committee and was active in volunteer youth work, Boy Scouts, and as a youth camp wilderness guide. He was a volunteer for the developmentally disabled.

=== Minnesota House of Representatives ===
Olson was originally elected to serve House District 19A in 1992, defeating Rep. Bob McEachem 51% to 46%.He won re-election against Bonnie Walters in 1994 60% to 30%, in 1996 against Cliff "Kip" Wold 60% to 40% and against Greg Hansen in 1998 and 2000, 61% to 39% and 63% to 37% respectively. Upon 2002 redistricting, Olson was pitted against incumbent Rep. Leslie Schumacher (Democratic-Farmer-Labor) to represent 16B and won 56% to 41%.

In 2004 he defeated Jim Huhala 59% to 37%. Olson was re-elected to his eighth term in 2006, defeating Jim Huhtala a second time 58% (10,484) to 42% (7,538). At the end of his final term he was the 18th longest-serving member of the House, and the (4th longest-serving Republican/IR).

==== Tenure ====
As a state representative, Olson was known for his lengthy floor speeches, often speaking to several Points of Order at the same time. They often related to House Rules, Roberts Rules of Order, and Mason's Manual of Legislative Procedure.

In earlier sessions, Olson was noted for authoring legislation supporting the development of a personal rapid transit system (PRT). However, Olson was a staunch critic of conventional rail transit, particularly the Northstar Commuter Rail line, which has since begun offering services from Minneapolis to his home town of Big Lake since his departure from the house.

Along with Michele Bachmann, Mark Olson sponsored The American Heritage in Public Education Act, which encourages schools to teach America's founding principles from original sources.

In 1997 allegations were made that he was abusive to his staff. Olson denied them and no charges were filed, however he attended two counseling sessions with Steve Sviggum, then Republican leader in the House.

During his time with the legislature Olson was routinely received high marks on the Taxpayer's League of Minnesota annual score card, and received the fiscally conservative groups "Best friend of the Taxpayer" award Five times for perfect scores. He also frequently scored high on the Legislative Evaluation Assembly of Minnesota (LEA) score card which "bases its evaluation on the traditional American principles of constitutionalism, limited government, free enterprise, legal and moral order with justice and individual liberty and dignity." Olson received perfect scores during his final year in office. He was also known for being staunchly pro-life.

During the 2007–2008 session, Olsen served on the following committees: Governmental Operations, Reform, Technology and Elections; K-12 Finance Division; Local Government and Metropolitan Affairs; Veterans Affairs Division. Olson received his first and only Committee Chairmanship in the Local Government Committee in 2005-2006.

==== Domestic assault charge ====
On November 11, 2006, days after winning re-election, Olson was arrested in Blaine after police were called to his Big Lake home. According to the criminal complaint, Olson’s wife Heidi told investigators that after an argument Olson pushed her to the ground three times. Olson later admitted to having taken his wife by the shoulders and "placing" her on the ground, according to the police report. After spending two nights in jail, Olson was charged with two misdemeanor counts of fifth degree domestic assault.

On December 7, 2006, Minnesota House Republicans voted to suspend Olson from their caucus. Republican leaders stated they would ask for Olson's resignation if he was convicted. While awaiting trial, Olson continued to serve his term as a self-identified "Independent Republican" and was allotted a session-only staff member by Republican caucus for the duration of the 2007 and 2008 sessions.

Olson was convicted of domestic assault by intending to cause fear of bodily harm against his wife, but was acquitted intentionally inflicting or attempting to inflict bodily harm. Olson publicly commented on the verdict by saying "I don't believe I had any intent to cause fear, but anger can cause fear and I did get angry." The Republican members voted to officially expel him from their caucus in early December 2007. Olsen then publicly asked the legislature for forgiveness during a house floor session.

==== 2008 campaign ====
In 2008, the Republican Party in District 16B chose to endorse former Secretary of State Mary Kiffmeyer instead of Olson. Olson considered re-election anyway, but did not file for re-election, leaving Kiffmeyer as the Republican candidate to face Democrat Steve Andrews in the election. During the week-long filing period for the House, it was announced that Senate District 16 Senator Betsy Wergin would be appointed by Governor Tim Pawlenty to be Public Utilities Commissioner and would be resigning her seat. This created a special election which Olson and Republican Activist Allison Krueger both filed for. After successfully defeating Krueger for the endorsement of local Republicans, elected Republican members of the State Senate and U.S. Senator Norm Coleman publicly criticized the endorsement. Senate caucus members organized support for Krueger in the state's primary, who because of the timing of the special election's filing period, was still on the primary ballot without an opportunity to withdraw. Olson was defeated in the primary by Krueger 46% (1518) to 54% (1771). After the primary, local delegates again convinced to reassess their endorsement and voted 61-18 on the first ballot to re-endorse Olson over Alison Krueger as a write in candidate. In the General election Olson received 3.2% (1462) to Krueger's 48.1% (22271). DFL candidate Lisa Fobbe received 48.3% (22356) and won the election. Olson's turnout was greater than the margin of Kureger's defeat.

During Minnesota's 2008 recounts, there were reports of Olson's name being either intentionally or erroneously written into the write-in sections for other races, including the 2008 United States Senate election.
