= Senator Gerlach =

Senator Gerlach may refer to:

- Chris Gerlach (born 1964), Minnesota State Senate
- Jim Gerlach (born 1955), Pennsylvania State Senate
