= Samantha Sencer-Mura =

American politician (born 1989)

Member of the Minnesota House of Representatives from the 63A district
- Incumbent
- Assumed office January 3, 2023
- Preceded by: Jim Davnie

Personal details
- Born: February 2, 1989 (age 37)
- Party: Democratic (DFL)
- Spouse: Lance
- Children: 1
- Parent: David Mura
- Education: Occidental College (BA); Harvard University (MEd)
- Occupation: Legislator
- Website: Government website Campaign website

Samantha Sencer-Mura (born February 2, 1989) is an American politician serving in the Minnesota House of Representatives since 2023. A member of the Minnesota Democratic-Farmer-Labor Party (DFL), Sencer-Mura represents District 63A in the Twin Cities metropolitan area, which includes parts of Minneapolis in Hennepin County.

== Early life, education and career ==
A fourth-generation Japanese-American, Sencer-Mura was raised in Minneapolis and attended South High School. Her father is David Mura, a poet and playwright. Her grandparents were incarcerated in internment camps during World War II.

Sencer-Mura earned a Bachelor of Arts degree in critical theory and social justice from Occidental College and a Master of Education in school leadership from the Harvard Graduate School of Education.

Sencer-Mura began her career as a teacher at Citizen Schools in New York City. She later worked as a coordinator at Safe Passages and community schools director of United for Success Academy in Oakland, California. In 2017, Sencer-Mura returned to Minneapolis to join 826 MSP, a nonprofit after-school program, as executive director.

== Minnesota House of Representatives ==
Sencer-Mura was elected to the Minnesota House of Representatives in 2022. She first ran for an open seat created by legislative redistricting and the retirement of 11-term DFL incumbent Jim Davnie. She is the first Japanese-American elected to the state legislature.

Sencer-Mura serves on the Agriculture Finance and Policy, Education Finance, Workforce Development Finance and Policy, and Transportation Finance and Policy Committees. She is a member of the House People of Color and Indigenous (POCI) Caucus and the Minnesota Asian and Pacific (MAP) Caucus.

=== Political positions ===
During the 2023 session, Sencer-Mura sponsored anti-hate crime legislation that would provide money to better track bias crimes and fund law enforcement trainings, citing anti-Asian backlash related to COVID-19's origins and saying "our communities are living in this state of red alert".

Sencer-Mura wrote a bill that would require Minnesota high schools offer an ethnic studies course, saying, "students of all racial and ethnic identities benefit from ethnic studies". She sponsored a transit safety bill after an 87-year-old woman in her district was injured while using public transit.

== Electoral history ==
2022 Minnesota State House - District 63A
Party	Candidate	Votes	%
Democratic (DFL)	Samantha Sencer-Mura	19,398	90.16
Republican	Kyle Bragg	2,087	9.70
Write-in		31	0.14
Total votes		21,516	100.0
Democratic (DFL) hold			

2024 Minnesota State House - District 63A
Party	Candidate	Votes	%
Democratic (DFL)	Samantha Sencer-Mura	20,289	98.76
Write-in		255	1.24
Total votes		20,544	100.00
Democratic (DFL) hold			

== Personal life ==
Sencer-Mura lives in Minneapolis with her spouse, Lance, and has one child.
