= Dave Brown (Minnesota politician) =

American politician

Member of the Minnesota Senate from the 15th district 16th (2011–2013)
- In office January 4, 2011 – January 2, 2017
- Preceded by: Lisa Fobbe
- Succeeded by: Andrew Mathews

Personal details
- Born: June 26, 1961 (age 65) Mount Auburn-La-Porte City, Iowa, US
- Party: Republican Party of Minnesota
- Spouse: Deb
- Children: 2
- Education: Oklahoma Wesleyan University
- Occupation: insurance agent

David M. Brown (born June 26, 1961) is a Minnesota politician and former member of the Minnesota Senate. A member of the Republican Party of Minnesota, he represented District 15, which included portions of Benton, Kanabec, Mille Lacs, Morrison, Sherburne and Wright counties in the central part of the state. The district also included the trust lands of the Mille Lacs Band of Ojibwe and Grand Casino Mille Lacs.

== Early life, education, and career ==
Brown grew up in Mount Auburn-La-Porte City, Iowa, and later attended Oklahoma Wesleyan University in Bartlesville, Oklahoma, graduating in 1983 with a B.A. in Behavioral Sciences.

Dave Brown works for UnitedHealth Group in Austin, Texas. He worked as an insurance agent with the Breitenfeldt Group until 2017. Preceding his insurance career, he worked with Word Entertainment, a major Christian music company based in Nashville, Tennessee.

== Minnesota Senate ==
Brown was first elected in 2010 and was re-elected in 2012. He did not seek re-election in 2016.
