= Bob Dettmer =

American politician

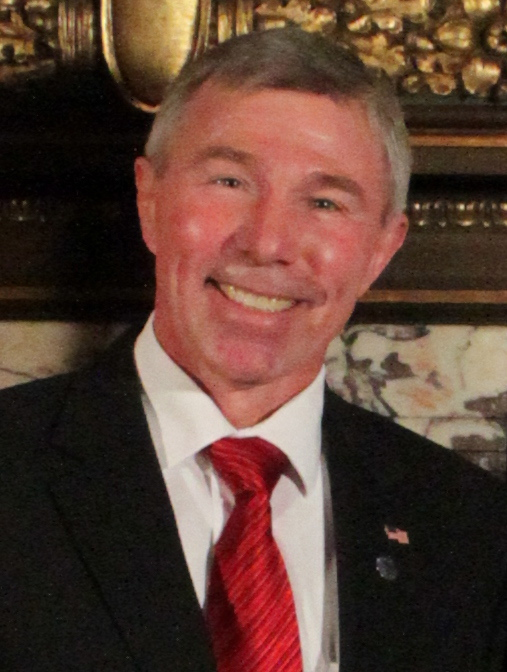

Member of the Minnesota House of Representatives from the 39A district 52A (2007–2013)
- In office January 3, 2007 – January 2023
- Preceded by: Ray Vandeveer

Personal details
- Born: March 1, 1951 (age 75) Faribault, Minnesota
- Party: Republican Party of Minnesota
- Spouse: Colleen Wendt
- Children: 3
- Education: Bemidji State University; University of St. Thomas
- Occupation: legislator, teacher, veteran

Robert P. "Bob" Dettmer (born March 1, 1951) is a Minnesota politician and former member of the Minnesota House of Representatives. A member of the Republican Party of Minnesota, he represented District 39A, located in the northeastern part of the Twin Cities metro area, which includes Chisago and Washington counties.

== Early life, education, and career ==
Dettmer attended Bemidji State University, graduating with a B.S. degree in health and physical education in 1973. He also holds a M.A. in education curriculum and instruction from St. Thomas University. He subsequently became a teacher in Forest Lake at Forest Lake High School, where he taught physical education and coached wrestling until 2007.

Dettmer served in the United States Army Reserve retiring as a Chief Warrant Officer 4 (CW4) in the Military Intelligence branch. In November 2001, he began a two-year tour on active duty supporting Operation Enduring Freedom at Fort Gordon, Georgia, and later Operation Iraqi Freedom. Two of his sons also serve as officers in the U.S. Army.

== Minnesota House of Representatives ==
Dettmer was elected in 2006 to the open seat vacated by Representative Ray Vandeveer, who ran for higher office that year. He served for eight terms, opting not to run for reelection in 2022. He focused on the issues of education, health care reform, economic growth, transportation, veterans and military affairs, and public safety.

== Local elections ==
=== 2018 ===
2018 Minnesota Legislature - House District 39A
Party	Candidate	Votes	%
Republican	Bob Dettmer	12,366	55.5%
Democratic (DFL)	Ann Mozey	9,881	44.4%

=== 2016 ===
2016 Minnesota Legislature - House District 39A
Party	Candidate	Votes	%
Republican	Bob Dettmer	14,565	61.4%
Democratic (DFL)	Jody W. Anderson	9,124	38.5%

=== 2014 ===
2014 Minnesota Legislature - House District 39A
Party	Candidate	Votes	%
Republican	Bob Dettmer	9,730	58.0
Democratic (DFL)	Tim Stender	7,028	41.9

=== 2012 ===
2012 Minnesota Legislature - House District 39A
Party	Candidate	Votes	%
Republican	Bob Dettmer	13,033	57.4
Democratic (DFL)	John Bruno	9,638	42.5

=== 2010 ===
2010 Minnesota Legislature - House District 52A
Party	Candidate	Votes	%
Republican	Bob Dettmer	13,183	66.7
Democratic (DFL)	Adam Best	6,548	33.2

=== 2008 ===
2008 Minnesota Legislature - House District 52A
Party	Candidate	Votes	%
Republican	Bob Dettmer	16,512	67.0
Democratic (DFL)	Rolanda L. Delamartienz	8,085	32.8

=== 2006 ===
2006 Minnesota Legislature - House District 52A
Party	Candidate	Votes	%
Republican	Bob Dettmer	6,632	56.7
Democratic (DFL)	Rob Rapheal	5,058	43.3

== See also ==
- 2006 Minnesota House of Representatives elections
- 2008 Minnesota House of Representatives elections
- 2010 Minnesota House of Representatives elections
- 2012 Minnesota House of Representatives elections
- 2014 Minnesota House of Representatives elections
