= Henry Kalis =

American politician (1937–2018)

Member of the Minnesota House of Representatives from the 26B district 30A (1975–1983), 29B (1983–1993)
- In office January 7, 1975 – January 6, 2003
- Preceded by: Dale Erdahl
- Succeeded by: Tony Cornish (District 24B)

Personal details
- Born: Henry Joseph Kalis; March 2, 1937 Easton, Minnesota, U.S.
- Died: September 12, 2018 (aged 81) Albert Lea, Minnesota, U.S.
- Party: Democratic–Farmer–Labor
- Spouse: Violet Rae Johnson (m. 1959)
- Children: 4

Henry Joseph Kalis (March 2, 1937 – September 12, 2018) was an American politician who was a member of the Minnesota House of Representatives, representing southern Minnesota. First elected in 1974, Kalis was reelected every two years until he opted not to seek reelection in 2002. A Democrat, he represented the old Districts 30A and 29B and, later, 26B, which included all or portions of Blue Earth, Faribault, Freeborn, Martin and Waseca counties, changing somewhat through redistricting in 1980 and 1990. He was, along with senators Dennis Frederickson, Earl Renneke and Jim Vickerman, and representatives Gilbert Esau and Wendell Erickson, one of the longest-serving legislators from southern Minnesota in the state's history.

== Early life ==
Kalis was born on March 2, 1937, in Easton, Minnesota. He graduated from Kiester High School in Kiester, Minnesota, in 1955. He married Violet Rae Johnson on November 28, 1959. They ran a farm together in Walters, until their retirement in 2013 when they moved to Albert Lea.

Kalis served in the United States Army and in the Minnesota National Guard (Company A, 147th Division) for four years before becoming active locally as a town treasurer and a township board member in Foster Township, Faribault County, Minnesota. From 1970 he served as a member of the Faribault County board of commissioners before opting to run for the Minnesota House of Representatives in 1974. He won his seat in the legislature for the Minnesota Democratic–Farmer–Labor Party (DFL) in 1974 despite a strong shift toward the Republican party in southern Minnesota at the time. A fellow representative later said of him, "Henry seemed to win whether it was a good year for Democrats or a bad year for Democrats".

== Minnesota House of Representatives ==
Kalis served in the legislature until 2002, representing parts of Blue Earth, Faribault, Freeborn, Martin and Waseca counties. He earned a reputation as a conservative Democrat, and was a champion for farmers and agricultural issues, and for transportation issues. Kalis served on the House Agriculture, Appropriations, Capital Investment, Economic Development, Education, Environment & Natural Resources, Financial Institutions & Insurance, Health & Human Services, Judiciary, Local & Urban Affairs, Regulated Industries, Transportation, and Ways & Means committees, and on various other committee incarnations and subcommittees. He was known for his moderatism and bipartisan approach, becoming renowned for voting against the Democratic Party. Owing to his experience he often acted as an informal mentor to newly elected rural representatives.

Kalis was chair of the House Transportation Committee from 1987 to 1992, and of the House Capital Investment Committee from 1993 to 1998. He also served as chair of numerous subcommittees through the years (Agriculture Subcommittee: Soil and Water Resources; Appropriations Subcommittee: Agriculture, Transportation & Semi-State Division; Appropriations Subcommittee: Joint Claims; Local and Urban Affairs Subcommittee: Governmental Administration; and Transportation Subcommittee: Trunk Highways). As chair of the Capital Investment Committee Kalis was known for not being afraid to turn down inefficient proposals and for his even-handed approach; he once said, "buildings don't care if they're in a Democrat or a Republican district". A recovering alcoholic, he often spoke publicly about the dangers of alcoholism.

Kalis earned the distinction of being the first legislative candidate to file for office each year that he ran, often arriving at the Minnesota Secretary of State's office in Saint Paul early the morning or even the day before the opening date for filing. He said he did this because "I enjoy this job and I think when you like something you should show people you like it." He occasionally camped out in front of the Secretary of State's office in a sleeping bag.

== Retirement ==
In 2002, Kalis opted to retire from the House, feeling that the time was right, but adding that it was "hardest decision" he had made. He served his constituents for 28 years, and was first in line at the Minnesota Secretary of State's office 14 times. After retiring, he returned to farming near Walters, Minnesota until 2013 and largely kept out of politics.

== Death ==
Kalis died on September 12, 2018, in Albert Lea, Minnesota, aged 81. After his death Minnesota DFL chairman Ken Martin said that "as a legislator, Henry earned a reputation for championing issues to improve the lives of not just his constituents, but all Minnesotans".
