= Mark Holsten =

American politician

Mark William Holsten

Member of the Minnesota House of Representatives
- In office 1993–2002
- Preceded by: Geri Evans
- Succeeded by: Rebecca Otto

Deputy Commissioner of the Minnesota Department of Natural Resources

Personal details
- Born: 1965 (age 60–61)
- Party: Republican
- Education: University of Minnesota Duluth, University of St. Thomas

Mark William Holsten (born September 6, 1965) is an American politician in Minnesota. Holsten, a Republican, served in the Minnesota House of Representatives from 1993 to 2002. He represented district 56A until November 2002 and, after redistricting, won election in 52B but was appointed Deputy Commissioner of the Minnesota Department of Natural Resources before the following session started. He served as chairman of the House Environment and Natural Resources Finance Committee. Holsten was appointed to replace Eugene R. Merriam as Commissioner of the Department of Natural Resources starting in January 2007.

== Early life and education ==
Holsten holds a bachelor's degree in sociology and history from the University of Minnesota Duluth and a teaching license from the University of Saint Thomas.

== Electoral history ==
- 2002 MN State House Seat 52B
  - Mark Holsten (R), 58.75%
  - Rebecca Otto (DFL), 41.17%
- 2000 MN State House Seat 56A
  - Mark Holsten (R), 57.57%
  - Joan M. Beaver (DFL), 42.43%
- 1998 MN State House Seat 56A
  - Mark Holsten (R), 64.3%
  - Paul A. Hetland (DFL), 35.5%

== Personal life ==
Holsten is a Lutheran. His father, Roy W. Holsten, also served in the Minnesota Legislature.

Political offices
Preceded by Geri Evans	Minnesota State Representative - 52B District; 2003	Succeeded by Rebecca Otto
Preceded by Jeffrey O. Hanson	Minnesota State Representative - 56A District; 1993-2003	Succeeded by Eric Lipman
