= Lisa Fobbe =

American politician (born 1963)

Member of the Minnesota Senate from the 16th district
- In office January 6, 2009 – January 3, 2011
- Preceded by: Betsy Wergin
- Succeeded by: David Brown

Personal details
- Born: January 23, 1963 (age 63)
- Party: Minnesota Democratic-Farmer-Labor Party
- Children: 3
- Education: College of St. Benedict
- Occupation: Legislator

Lisa A. Fobbe (born January 23, 1963) is a Minnesota politician and a former member of the Minnesota Senate who represented District 16, which includes portions of Benton, Mille Lacs, Morrison and Sherburne counties in the central part of the state. The district also includes the trust lands of the Mille Lacs Band of Ojibwe and Grand Casino Mille Lacs. A Democrat, she was first elected to the Senate in a special election held on November 4, 2008. The seat became vacant when Senator Betsy Wergin resigned on July 28, 2008, in order to accept an appointment by Minnesota Governor Tim Pawlenty as a member of the Minnesota Public Utilities Commission. She was unseated by Republican David Brown in the 2010 general election.

Fobbe was a member of the Senate's Agriculture and Veterans Committee, the Education Committee, and the Environment and Natural Resources Committee. She also served on the Finance subcommittees for the Agriculture and Veterans Budget and Policy Division and the E-12 Education Budget and Policy Division. Her special legislative concerns included education, health care, transportation, and the economy.

Fobbe attended the College of St. Benedict in St. Joseph, receiving a B.A. in social work. She served on and chaired the Princeton School Board from 2000 to 2008. She also served on the executive board of the Minnesota School Board Association Board of Directors, on the Minnesota High School League Board of Directors, on the Early Childhood Family Education and School Readiness Advisory Council, and on the local board of the Kinship Youth Mentoring program.
