= Dennis Ozment =

American politician

Member of the Minnesota House of Representatives from district 37B
- In office January 7, 2003 – January 5, 2009
- Preceded by: Mary Liz Holberg
- Succeeded by: Phil Sterner
- In office January 8, 1985 – January 4, 1993
- Preceded by: Harry A. Sieben
- Succeeded by: Bill Macklin

Member of the Minnesota House of Representatives from district 37A
- In office January 5, 1993 – January 6, 2003
- Preceded by: Eileen Tompkins
- Succeeded by: Chris Gerlach

Personal details
- Born: May 2, 1945 (age 81) Farmington, Minnesota, U.S.
- Party: Republican

Dennis Ozment (born May 2, 1945) is an American politician who served in the Minnesota House of Representatives from 1985 to 2009.
