= Dean Johnson (politician) =

American politician (born 1947)

Dean Elton Johnson

8th Minnesota Senate Majority Leader
- In office January 2004 – January 2007
- Preceded by: John Hottinger
- Succeeded by: Larry Pogemiller

11th Minnesota Senate Minority Leader
- In office January 1993 – July 9, 1997
- Preceded by: Duane Benson
- Succeeded by: Dick Day

Member of the Minnesota Senate from the 13th district
- In office January 6, 2003 – December 31, 2006
- Preceded by: Don Samuelson
- Succeeded by: Joseph Gimse

Minnesota State Representative
- In office 1979–1983

Personal details
- Born: June 24, 1947 (age 79)
- Party: Republican, 1983–2000; DFL, 2000–present
- Spouse(s): Avonelle Johnson (deceased), Debbie Johnson
- Children: 1
- Education: Luther College; Luther Seminary; U.S. Army War College
- Occupation: Minister, National Guard, University Regent

Military service
- Branch/service: United States Army National Guard
- Rank: Brigadier General

Dean Elton Johnson (born June 24, 1947, in Lanesboro, Minnesota) is a former Minnesota politician and a member of the Board of Regents of the University of Minnesota. He is a former member of the Minnesota House of Representatives, and a former member, majority leader and minority leader of the Minnesota Senate.

== Service in the Minnesota House and Senate ==
Johnson was first elected to the House in 1978, representing the old District 21A, and served from 1979 to 1983. He was elected to the Senate in 1982 and represented District 13 in the west central part of the state. Prior to the 2002 legislative redistricting, the area was known as District 15. Through the years, he represented all or portions of Chippewa, Kandiyohi, McLeod, Meeker, Pope, Renville, Stearns and Yellow Medicine counties in the southwestern part of the state.

As a Republican, Johnson served as Senate Minority Leader from 1993 to 1997. Notably, as Senate Minority Leader, Johnson cast a deciding vote in the passage of the 1993 Human Rights Act, which banned LGBT discrimination in housing, employment, and education. In 2000, he switched parties, leaving the Republican Party to join the DFL Party. He subsequently served as Majority Leader from 2004 until 2007. He is the only Minnesota senator to have led both caucuses in that chamber, and one of only three to serve as both minority and majority leader.

== 2006 controversial remarks ==
In March 2006, controversy arose over remarks Johnson made in January of that year to a group of pastors. Johnson said he had a conversation with an unnamed Minnesota Supreme Court justice, who supposedly gave him informal assurances that the court would not overturn Minnesota's statute defining marriage as between one man and one woman. There was concern that the Minnesota Supreme Court might strike down the Minnesota statute the way the Massachusetts Supreme Court had struck down a similar statute in that state, thus legalizing gay marriage.

When a tape recording of Johnson's remarks surfaced, the justices of the Minnesota Supreme Court denied that any such conversation had ever taken place. Republicans filed an ethics complaint against Johnson. He subsequently apologized for embellishing the story. This controversy contributed to the loss of his senate seat to Republican Joe Gimse in the general election that November.

== Background, education and professional career ==
Johnson resides in Willmar. He is widowed, has one child, two grandchildren, and is a minister in the Evangelical Lutheran Church in America. His wife of 21 years, Avonelle Johnson, died of cancer in 2005. Johnson later remarried.

Johnson holds a Bachelor of Arts degree from Luther College, a Master of Divinity from Luther Seminary, and a Master of Strategic Studies from the U.S. Army War College. He is a chaplain holding a general's rank in the National Guard. In 2007, he was selected as a Regent of the University of Minnesota. He was re-elected in 2013.

== See also ==
- List of American politicians who switched parties in office
