= Judy Soderstrom =

American politician

Judy Soderstrom (born April 9, 1942) is an American legislator.

Soderstrom lived in Mora, Minnesota, with her husband and family, and graduated from Mora High School. She was involved in the real estate business. Soderstrom served in the Minnesota House of Representatives from 2003 to 2006 and was a Republican.
