= Nora Slawik =

American politician (born 1962)

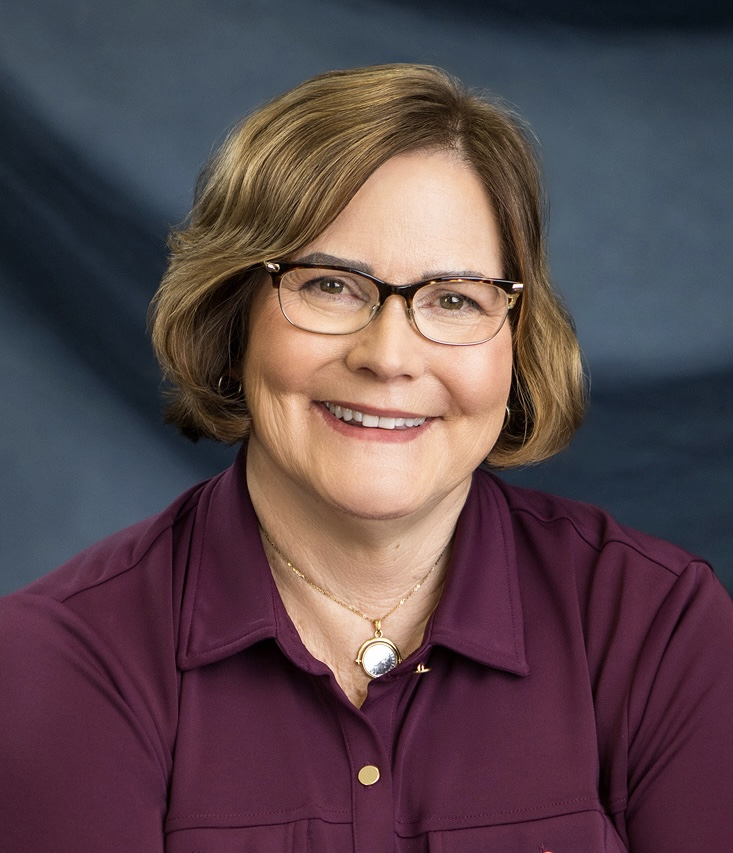

Chairwoman of the Metropolitan Council
- In office January 9, 2019 – November 15, 2019
- Preceded by: Alene Tchourumoff
- Succeeded by: Charlie Zelle

Mayor of Maplewood, Minnesota
- In office January 7, 2014 – January 9, 2019
- Preceded by: Will Rossbach
- Succeeded by: Marylee Abrams

Member of the Minnesota House of Representatives
- In office 1997 – 1998; 2000 – 2012
- Preceded by: Walt Perlt
- Succeeded by: JoAnn Ward

Personal details
- Born: November 23, 1962 (age 63) Tucson, Arizona, U.S.
- Party: Democratic-Farmer-Labor
- Spouse: Mark Buckwheat
- Children: 2 Adult children
- Education: Arizona State University (B.A.); University of Minnesota (M.P.A.)

Nora Bayly Slawik (born November 23, 1962) is a Minnesota politician, previously serving as Chairwoman of the Metropolitan Council, Maplewood Mayor and Minnesota State Representative. From 1997 to 1998 and 2001–2002, she represented District 57A, and from 2003 to 2012, she represented District 55B, which includes portions of Ramsey and Washington counties and the cities of Maplewood and Oakdale in the eastern part of the Twin Cities metropolitan area. As Mayor of Maplewood, first elected in 2013 and re-elected in 2018, she oversaw economic redevelopment, increased public safety, and expansion of Maplewood's public outdoor spaces. In 2018, she was appointed by Governor Tim Walz to serve as head of the Metropolitan Council, where she worked until stepping down in November 2019. She also has a history of community service before her time in office, including her development of Juniper as their Project Manager for the Metropolitan Area Agency on Aging from 2016 to 2017.

== Early life and education ==
Slawik was born on November 23, 1962, in Tucson, Arizona, and later moved to Minnesota.

Slawik’s family has longstanding ties in Minnesota: her grandfather published a local newspaper in Benson, Minnesota.

She earned a Bachelor of Science in Recreation Administration from Arizona State University and a Master of Public Administration from the University of Minnesota’s Humphrey School of Public Affairs. She later served as an adjunct professor and mentor at the University of Minnesota.

== Legislative service ==
Slawik was first elected in 1996 and served one term. She ran again in 2000, was elected for six more consecutive terms as a Democrat. Prior to the 2002 legislative redistricting, she represented the old District 57A. She served on a variety of committees including as Chair of the Early Learning Finance Division for two terms, Health Care and Human Services Finance Division, State Government Finance Division and Ways and Means. She served as an assistant minority leader during the 2003-2004 biennium. In 2012, she announced that she was stepping down.

== Maplewood Mayor ==
In 2013, Slawik announced that she would seek election as Mayor of Maplewood and won the DFL endorsement. In the primary, she received 60% of the vote, and faced former Mayor Diana Longrie in the November election. Slawik won the Mayor election in November with 67 percent of the vote. She served as the Chair of the Rush Line Policy Advisory Committee; alternate on the Gateway Corridor Commission, and as Fourth Vice President of the Minnesota Mayors Association.

In 2018, Slawik was successfully re-elected to a second term for Mayor of Maplewood.

She faced opponent Margaret Behrens and won with 63% of the vote. Following her appointment to chair the Metropolitan Council, City Councilwoman Marylee Abrams was appointed to fill the soon-to-be-vacant Mayor seat.

== Metropolitan Council ==
In December 2018, Governor Tim Walz announced that he would appoint Nora Slawik as Chairwoman of the Metropolitan Council to join his incoming cabinet. Nora was officially sworn in as chair on January 9, 2019. As chair of the council and Cabinet member she oversaw policymaking, planning, and services in the areas of water, transportation, parks, and housing for the Twin Cities metropolitan region. The council's work is performed by three primary organizational divisions: community development, environmental services, and the transportation division that includes Metro Transit and the Metropolitan Transportation Services. On October 31, 2019 she submitted her letter of resignation to Governor Walz citing health issues, stepping down on November 15.

== Post-political career ==
After stepping down as Chair of the Metropolitan Council in 2019, Slawik was appointed Executive Director of the Century College Foundation in White Bear Lake, Minnesota. There, she led fundraising, alumni engagement, and private foundation grants for the state college. Slawik retired from Century College in July 2025.

In August 2025, she continued her nonprofit fundraising consulting practice. Clients included the Mahtomedi Area Educational Foundation (MAEF) supporting public education in the Mahtomedi Area Schools.

Slawik remains active in civic and educational initiatives. She is a member of the White Bear Lake Rotary.

== Political Views ==
Nora Slawik has described herself as a moderate Democrat, expressing concern about increasing partisanship and polarization in legislative politics, and noting that lawmakers often focus on divisive issues rather than basic priorities such as education and healthcare. She has consistently emphasized early childhood education and related policy, advocating for expanded state support and infrastructure for children’s learning and development. As Chair of the Metropolitan Council, she highlighted affordable housing, equitable transit, and regional economic opportunity as key issues facing the Twin Cities region, calling for collaborative planning and investment to address housing cost burdens and improve transportation systems. Slawik also underscored the importance of transportation services that support people with disabilities and connect residents to jobs and community life.

== Personal life ==
She is married to Mark Buckwheat, and the couple has four children. Prior to her current marriage, she raised two children, a daughter, Victoria, and a son, Sean, while she was serving in the Minnesota Legislature.
