= Karen Klinzing =

American politician

Karen Klinzing (born September 28, 1970) is an American educator and politician.

Klinzing lived in Woodbury, Minnesota. She received her bachelor's degree from the University of Wisconsin–Madison and her master's degree from Hamline University. Klinzing taught history, civics, and economics at Bloomington High School in Bloomington, Minnesota. Klinzing served in the Minnesota House of Representatives from 2003 to 2006 as a Republican. Since 2024 she has served as the Interim Executive Director of Hiawatha Academies, a public charter school in Minneapolis.
