= Eric Lipman =

American politician

Eric L. Lipman is an American politician and judge in Minnesota. He served in the Minnesota House of Representatives from 2001 to 2004 as a member of the Republican party, representing district 56B until November 2002 and after redistricting district 56A.

== Career ==
Lipman holds a Bachelor of Arts degree in political science from Union College and obtained his Juris Doctor degree from George Washington University Law School.

=== Minnesota House of Representatives, 2001-2004 ===
During the 82nd Legislative Session(2001-2), Lipman served as the Chairman of the House Subcommittee on Elections.

During the 83rd Legislative Session,(2002-4) Lipman served as vice-chairman of the House Governmental Operations and Veterans Affairs Policy Committee, and was part of the negotiating team on the Omnibus Judiciary Finance Bill.

=== Sex Offender Policy Coordinator, 2004-2006 ===
After the 2004 legislative session, Lipman resigned and accepted an inter-agency position in Governor Tim Pawlenty's Administration as State's Sex Offender Policy Coordinator.

In September 2004, Pawlenty officially assigned him as the Coordinator staff liaison between a 12-member panel and the Governor's office where Lipman pressed for reform on the sentencing, supervision and treatment of predatory offenders in Minnesota. In January 2005, Pawlenty drew upon the panel's work when he proposed sex offender reforms. A number of these reforms were enacted by the Minnesota Legislature that year.

=== Administrative Law Judge, 2006-present ===
In August 2006, Lipman was appointed by then-Chief Administrative Law Judge Raymond R. Krause as an Administrative Law Judge in the Minnesota Office of Administrative Hearings. Between June 2010 and September 2013, Lipman served as the Assistant Chief Administrative Law Judge for the Administrative Law Division.

During his tenure as an Administrative Law Judge, Lipman rendered written opinions in a number of high-profile cases, including:

- in 2013 on childhood vaccinations, In the Matter of the Proposed Rules of the Department of Health Governing School and Child Care Immunizations, OAH Docket No. 8-0900-30570
- in 2014 regarding the international building code, In the Matter of the International Residential Code, OAH Docket No. 8-1900-30855
- in 2014 regarding an Xcel Energy solar energy `planIn the Matter of the Petition of Xcel Energy for Approval of a Competitive Resource Acquisition Proposal, OAH Docket No. 8-2500-30760
- in 2014 regarding healthcare surcharge appealsIn the Matter of the Consolidated Hospital Surcharge Appeals of Gillette Children's Specialty Healthcare
- in 2015 regarding the Sandpiper pipeline, In the Matter of the Application of North Dakota Pipeline Company, LLC for a Certificate of Need for the Sandpiper pipeline Project in Minnesota, OAH Docket No. 8-2500-31260

== Electoral history ==
- 2000 MN State House Seat 56B
  - Eric Lipman (R), 47.17%
  - Mike Redmond (DFL), 45.49%
- 2002 MN State House Seat 56A
  - Eric Lipman (R), 49.99%
  - Mike Redmond (DFL), 46.18%
