= Ron Abrams =

American politician

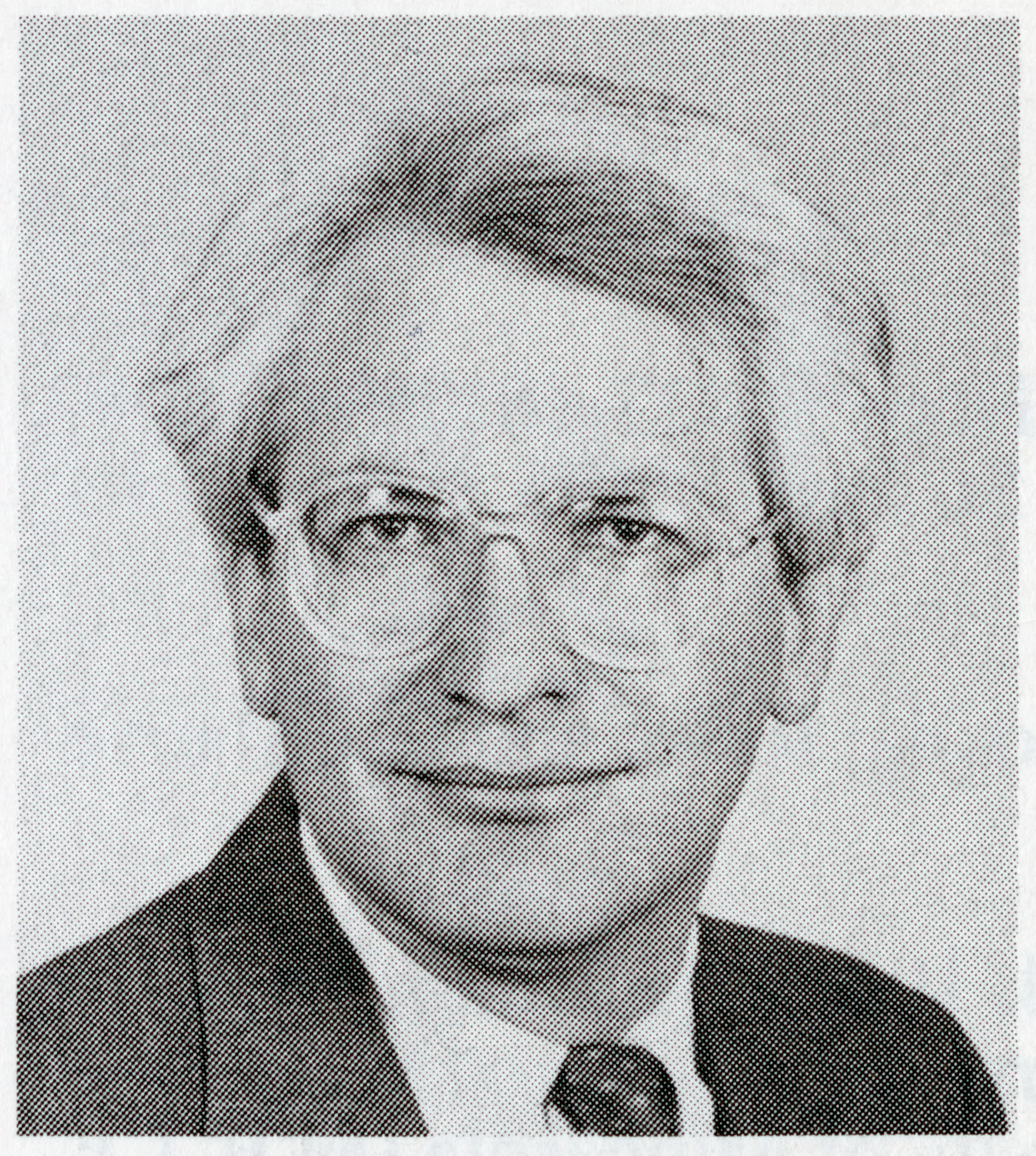
- Abrams c. 1991

Member of the Minnesota House of Representatives 45A (1989-2002), 43B (2003-2006)
- Preceded by: Craig H. Shaver
- Succeeded by: John Benson

Personal details
- Born: April 27, 1952 (age 74) Minneapolis, Minnesota, U.S.
- Party: Republican
- Spouse: Joanne Rogin-Abrams
- Children: 2
- Education: University of Minnesota; Harvard Law School
- Occupation: Attorney, judge

Ronald "Ron" Lawrence Abrams (born April 27, 1952) is a judge and former Minnesota politician. He served in the Minnesota House of Representatives from 1989 to 2006. A member of the Republican Party, Abrams represented District 45A from 1989 to 2002 and District 43B from 2003 to 2009, which included his home city of Minnetonka in Hennepin County.

Abrams resigned his seat in the House in 2006 to accept a judicial appointment from Governor Tim Pawlenty with the Hennepin County District Court 4th Judicial District. In 2020 he was appointed by Governor Tim Walz to serve statewide as a Senior Judge.

== Early life, education and career ==
Abrams was born in Minneapolis and graduated from St. Louis Park High School. He received his bachelor's degree in economics, History, and Political Science from the University of Minnesota, graduating Summa Cum Laude in 1974 and his juris doctor from Harvard Law School in 1977.

Abrams worked as an attorney and area manager, for Group W. Cable Television in Minneapolis from 1980 to 1984 and as an attorney for Briggs and Morgan in St. Paul from 1977 to 1980.

Abrams worked as a summer intern for U.S. Representative Bill Frenzel. and worked at the Minnesota House of Representatives as a Committee Administrator from 1985 to 1986 prior to his election to the same body.

== Minnesota House of Representatives ==
Abrams was elected to the Minnesota House of Representatives in 1988, first running as an Independent Republican and later as a member of the Republican Party of Minnesota after the party changed its name.

Abrams served as an Assistant Minority Leader from 1993 to 1998, and as Speaker Pro Tempore of the House from 1999 to 2006. He chaired the Taxes Committee from 1999 to 2004.

Abrams resigned his seat in the House on June 21, 2006, to accept a judicial appointment from Governor Tim Pawlenty. A special election was not held to fill the seat.

== Judicial career ==
Abrams was appointed to the Hennepin County District Court 4th Judicial District in 2006 by Governor Tim Pawlenty. He was re-elected in 2008 and 2014, retiring on August 31, 2020. He was appointed by Governor Tim Walz to serve statewide as a Senior Judge from July 1, 2021, to June 30, 2025. His judicial assignments included criminal, civil, and family law.

== Personal life ==
Abrams and his spouse, Joanne have two children. He resided in Minnetonka, Minnesota while elected to the state legislature. He is Jewish.
