= Tony Cornish =

American politician

Member of the Minnesota House of Representatives from the 23B district 24B (2003–2013)
- In office January 7, 2003 – November 30, 2017
- Preceded by: Henry Kalis (District 26B)
- Succeeded by: Jeremy Munson

Personal details
- Born: May 3, 1951 (age 75)
- Party: Republican
- Children: 3
- Relatives: Jesse Ventura (nephew-in-law)

Tony Cornish (born May 3, 1951) is a retired American police officer and former politician from the Republican Party. He was a member of the Minnesota House of Representatives. He resigned in disgrace from the Minnesota House on November 30, 2017, following multiple accusations of sexual harassment.

== Early life, education, and career ==
Cornish was educated at Garden City High School in Garden City Township, Minnesota and has received secondary education. From 1975 to 1977, he served as a police officer for the city of Amboy. From 1977 to 1980, he served as a deputy sheriff for Blue Earth County. In 1980, he became a conservation officer for the Minnesota Department of Natural Resources, serving 22 years before retiring in 2002. He was the police chief of Lake Crystal from 2007 to 2012.

== Minnesota House of Representatives ==
Cornish was elected to the Minnesota House of Representatives in 2002 and was re-elected in 2004, 2006, 2008, 2010, 2012, 2014, and 2016. Cornish had a history of treating staff and lobbyists very poorly during his tenure in the Minnesota House of Representatives. Cornish also had a history of using his state issued email for inappropriate messaging of other female representatives and lobbyists and would chastise staff for looking at his email, despite his directions to assist him with email. On November 27, 2017, Cornish submitted his letter of resignation, which became effective at 11:59 p.m. on November 30, 2017. In a letter, Cornish apologized to his fellow house members for "bringing a cloud over the House and my friends." He also submitted an inappropriate letter that included a "wish list" for his replacement that went on to argue against anti-cop bills and the need for legislative action that would push cops to obtain their own liability insurance.

== Sexual harassment allegations ==
In November 2017, state Rep. Erin Maye Quade and another woman, a lobbyist, accused Cornish of sexually harassing them. In response, Cornish said that his interaction with Maye Quade was taken out of context and meant as a friendly, joking exchange. He said the incidents in his office alleged by the lobbyist never happened, though he admitted that he did send her a string of text messages soliciting sex. House Speaker Kurt Daudt suspended Cornish as chairman of the Public Safety Committee following the allegations.

Subsequently, former House Speaker Kurt Zellers said that during his time as speaker from 2011 to 2012 he had confronted Cornish about sexually harassing women at the State Capitol and called for him to resign. In interviews with MPR News, 25 people who worked with or around Cornish the past seven years described alleged unwanted sexual advances and unwanted flirtatious contact.

== Personal life ==
Cornish resides in Vernon Center. He is divorced, has three children, and is affiliated with the Lutheran Church–Missouri Synod. In 1990, a Koochiching County judge granted Cornish’s ex-wife, Mary, a domestic abuse protection order against him. They had divorced two years earlier. A copy of the one-year protection order, dated July 23, 1990, offers scant details of the circumstances, saying only that “the evidence justifies issuance of the order.” He is the uncle of former Minnesota Governor Jesse Ventura's wife, Terry.

== Electoral history ==
2010 Minnesota State Representative District 24B

Statewide Voter Turnout TBD %

Tony Cornish (R), 9621 votes, 63%

Joan Muth-Milks (DFL), 3417 votes, 22%

Mark D. Meyer (I), 2242 votes, 15%

Write-In, 9 votes, 0.05%

2008 Minnesota State Representative District 24B

Statewide Voter Turnout 78.49%

Tony Cornish (R), 10275 votes, 51.18%

John Branstad (DFL), 9781 votes, 48.72%

Write-In, 10 votes, 0.10%

2006 Minnesota State Representative District 24B

Statewide Voter Turnout 60.46%

Tony Cornish (R), 9108 votes, 54.34%

Jim Peterson (DFL), 7636 votes, 45.56%

Write-In, 16 votes, 0.10%

2004 Minnesota State Representative District 24B

Statewide Voter Turnout 78.77%

Tony Cornish (R), 12416 votes, 60.27%

Terry Clodfelter (DFL), 8172 votes, 39.67%

Write-In, 13 votes, 0.06%

2002 Minnesota State Representative District 24B

Statewide Voter Turnout 64.89%

Tony Cornish (R), 8959 votes, 51.60%

Sandy Lorenz (DFL), 8388 votes, 48.31%

Write-In, 16 votes, 0.09%

Minnesota House of Representatives
Preceded by Henry Kalis	Member of the House of Representatives from District 23B; 24B (2003–2013); 2003–2017	Succeeded by TBD
