= Marty Seifert =

American politician (born 1972)

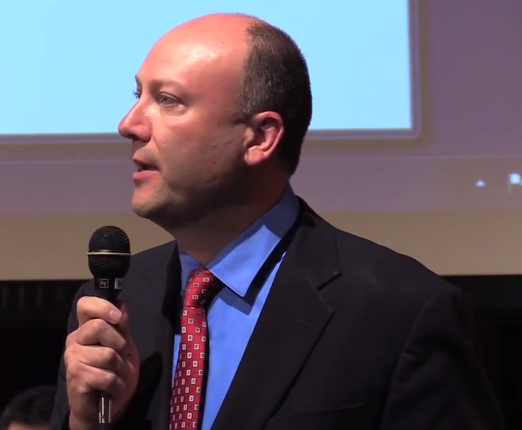
- Seifert in 2014

Minority Leader of the Minnesota House of Representatives
- In office January 3, 2007 – June 3, 2009
- Preceded by: Margaret Kelliher
- Succeeded by: Kurt Zellers

Member of the Minnesota House of Representatives from the 21A district
- In office January 7, 1997 – January 3, 2011
- Preceded by: Jim Girard
- Succeeded by: Chris Swedzinski

Personal details
- Born: Martin John Seifert; April 23, 1972 (age 54) Springfield, Minnesota, U.S.
- Party: Republican
- Spouse: Traci Seifert
- Children: Brittany; Braxton
- Education: Southwest Minnesota State University

Martin John Seifert (born April 23, 1972) is a former Republican Minority Leader and former member of the Minnesota House of Representatives. He represented District 21A, a predominantly rural district in southwestern Minnesota that includes portions of Lyon, Redwood and Yellow Medicine counties, and the cities of Marshall and Redwood Falls. In 2010 and 2014, he unsuccessfully sought the Republican nomination for Governor of Minnesota.

== Minnesota House of Representatives ==
First elected in 1996, Seifert served as House Majority Whip from 1999 to 2006. When the Republicans lost control of the House after the 2006 election, he took over leadership of the party in the House from former Speaker Steve Sviggum.

Seifert served on the House Rules and Legislative Administration Committee and was an ex officio member of the House Finance Committee and the House Ways and Means Committee.

On June 3, 2009, Seifert announced that he was stepping down from his position as minority leader to run for governor of Minnesota. On October 15, 2009, he also announced that he would not seek re-election to the House, but would concentrate his efforts on the 2010 governor's race.

== 2010 gubernatorial campaign ==
At the Republican Party of Minnesota's off-year state convention held on October 3, 2009, at the Xcel Energy Center in St. Paul, Seifert was the first-place winner of a non-binding straw poll, receiving 37% of the vote. He was followed by state representative Tom Emmer with 23% of the vote and former state auditor Patricia Anderson with 14% of the vote.

On February 2, 2010, Seifert won a statewide straw poll of Republican voters attending their precinct caucuses. He garnered 50% of the vote, followed by Rep. Tom Emmer with 39%. No other candidate got beyond single digits.

On February 18, 2010, Seifert announced that Rhonda Sivarajah would be his running mate for Lieutenant Governor of Minnesota.

Seifert went into the 2010 State Republican Convention in a close battle with Tom Emmer, but fell behind on the first ballot. After the second ballot showed Emmer near the threshold for party endorsement, Seifert withdrew from the race, endorsed Emmer, and asked the convention to give Emmer their unanimous endorsement. He kept a low profile for the remainder of the gubernatorial race.

The gubernatorial race ultimately resulted in Democratic-Farmer-Labor nominee Mark Dayton defeating Emmer by less than 9,000 votes. The closeness of the race left many of Seifert's supporters from the endorsement process with sour feelings toward Emmer.

== Post-election activities ==
Following his endorsement of Emmer at the state convention, Seifert withdrew from the governors' race and served the rest of his term as a state representative, which he had promised would be his last term. Following the end of his term, he acquired a real estate license and began selling houses. He eventually became the executive director of the Avera Marshall Foundation, raising millions of dollars to construct and equip a new cancer facility for southwest Minnesota. At the time, he retained his real estate license and maintains a job as a buyer's agent with Real Estate Retrievers in Marshall.

In September 2010, he was admitted to a hospital after experiencing pain and shortness of breath, which was revealed to be the result of a fluid buildup in his left lung.

Following speculation that he may challenge incumbent Democratic Senator Amy Klobuchar in 2012, Seifert posted on his Facebook page on May 9, 2011, that he would not seek the Senate seat.

In 2014 Seifert had indicated that he was not interested in running against incumbent US Senator Al Franken, but did not rule out challenging incumbent Democratic Governor Mark Dayton.

== 2014 gubernatorial campaign ==
Seifert resisted all calls to re-enter politics until late 2012. During a Minnesota Public Radio interview on November 8, 2012, Seifert hinted that he might once again seek statewide office in the 2014 election, though he was not completely sold on the idea and said that it was merely "possible." Later that same week, Seifert told another news source that he was considering another statewide run after seeing Minnesota Republicans handily defeated in the 2012 election, though he reiterated that it was only a possibility, citing family concerns and his life in the private sector.

During the Republican Party of Minnesota State Central Committee meeting on October 26, 2013, a straw poll was taken among the delegates to gauge support for candidates seeking to challenge incumbent Democratic Governor Mark Dayton and incumbent U.S. Senator Al Franken. Seifert was not listed among the candidates on either ballot, but a supporter organized a grassroots effort to have delegates write Seifert's name on the gubernatorial ballot. Though he did not campaign for votes and made no speeches at the convention, Seifert finished a surprising third in the straw poll. Seifert said that he would announce his decision by Thanksgiving.

On 12 November 2013, GOP sources confirmed that Seifert will seek the Republican nomination for governor in the 2014 election. He joins a crowded GOP field of several candidates, two of whom have vowed to run in the primary regardless of who receives the endorsement at the state convention. Seifert himself has hinted that he plans to enter the primary election with or without the party endorsement.

He made his official campaign announcement on 21 November 2013 and launched his campaign website the previous day.

Seifert emerged as a top tier candidate on the night of the Minnesota Republican precinct caucuses. In a straw poll taken of all caucus goers, Seifert topped the list with 29%, followed closely by state senator Dave Thompson with 26%. Hennepin County Commissioner Jeff Johnson came in third with 17%, and all other candidates lagged in the single digits.

At the Minnesota GOP State Convention in Rochester on May 31, 2014, Seifert lost the GOP endorsement to Hennepin County Commissioner Jeff Johnson. In the first ballot, Seifert placed third with 568 votes for 29.38%, behind leader Johnson (having 620 votes for 32.07%) and state senator Dave Thompson (having 577 votes for 29.85%). On the second ballot, Seifert's support eroded to 555 votes, while Johnson's vote increased to 729 votes for 38.7%. On the third ballot, Seifert (503 votes) and Thompson (504 votes) continued to lose votes to Johnson (811 votes). After the third ballot, Thompson took the stage to implore delegates to support Johnson. After Thompson withdrew, Seifert took the stage and released his delegates to leave, vowing to run in the primary. On the fourth ballot, Johnson won the endorsement over Seifert.

After losing the endorsement, Seifert took his primary campaign to many areas of the state, including flying to 16 Minnesota cities in a media blitz immediately after the convention. On July 9, Seifert became the first Republican candidate to visit all of Minnesota's 87 counties.

In the August 12 primary, Seifert came in third place, earning 21.09% of the vote; the victor being Johnson with 30.34%. After the results were announced, Seifert endorsed Johnson and urged all his supporters to do the same.

The election ultimately saw Governor Mark Dayton re-elected over Jeff Johnson by five points.

== Education, family and career ==
Seifert attended college at Southwest Minnesota State University in Marshall. During his time there, he brought the College Republicans back to the school, and later became the student body president. Upon graduation in 1995, he received a B.S. in Political Science. He is a member of the Southwest State University Alumni Association, and a former member of the Minnesota State Colleges and Universities Board of Trustees.

Seifert is married to Traci (DeSutter) and has two children. He is a former government and history teacher at Marshall Senior High School, and admissions counselor at Southwest Minnesota State University.

Seifert worked in real estate, owning Seifert Properties and is the former executive director of the Avera Marshall Foundation.

In 2014, Seifert began working in government relations for the firm of Flaherty& Hood, P.A. in St. Paul. While keeping his residency in Marshall, he commutes during legislative session advocating chiefly for rural cities, persons with mild disabilities and aggregate truck haulers. He continues to own and operate Seifert Properties, LLC and is a member on the board of directors for three different companies.

Minnesota House of Representatives
Preceded by Jim Girard	Member of the Minnesota House of Representatives from the 21A district 1997–2011	Succeeded by Chris Swedzinski
Political offices
Preceded by Margaret Kelliher	Minority Leader of the Minnesota House of Representatives; 2007–2009	Succeeded by Kurt Zellers
