= Dean Simpson =

American politician (born 1950)

Dean Simpson (born September 7, 1950) was an American politician and businessman.

Simpson lived in New York Mills, Minnesota. He went to the New York Mills High School and to the Toledo Technical College in Toledo, Ohio. Simpson was involved in the grocery business. Simpson served on the New York Mills City Council from 1977 to 1979 and also served as the mayor of New York Mills, Minnesota from 1979 to 1982. He then lived in Perham, Minnesota with his wife and family. Simpson served in the Minnesota House of Representatives from 2003 to 2008 and was a Republican.
