= Richard W. Stanek =

American politician

Rich Stanek
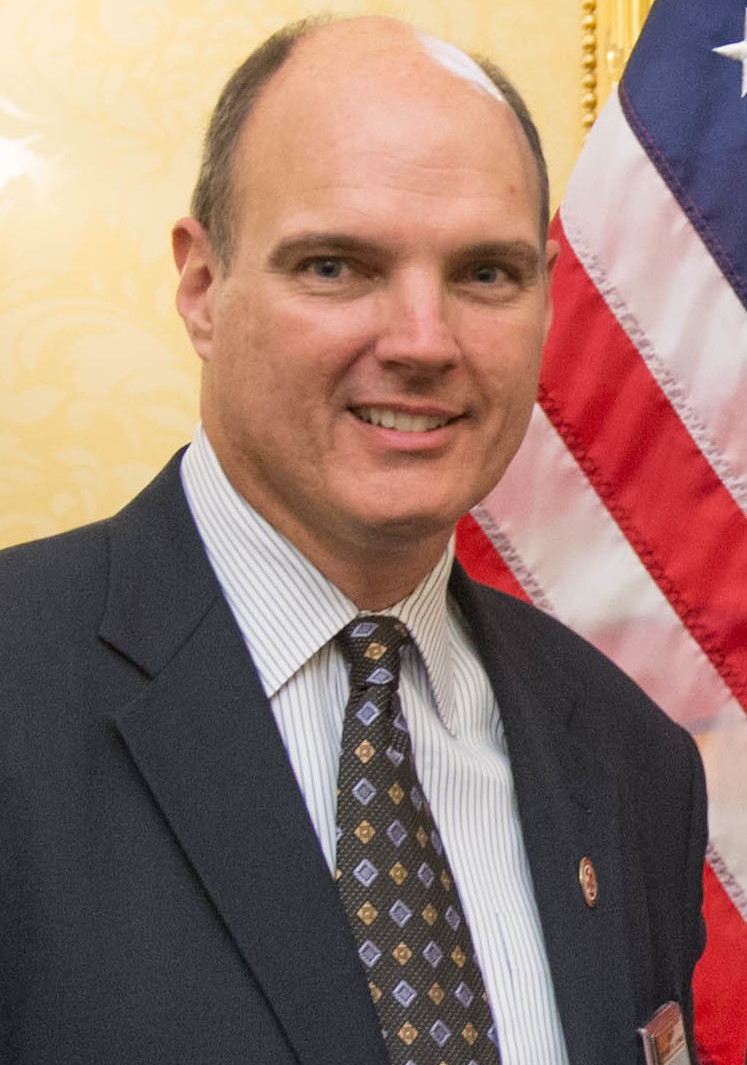

Sheriff of Hennepin County
- In office January 1, 2007 – January 7, 2019
- Preceded by: Patrick D. McGowan
- Succeeded by: Dave Hutchinson

Commissioner of the Minnesota Department of Public Safety
- In office January 30, 2003 – April 16, 2004
- Governor: Tim Pawlenty
- Preceded by: Charlie Weaver
- Succeeded by: Michael Campion

Member of the Minnesota House of Representatives
- In office March 13, 1995 – January 30, 2003
- Preceded by: Warren Limmer
- Succeeded by: Kurt Zellers
- Constituency: District 33B (1995-2003); District 32B (2003)

Personal details
- Born: February 2, 1962 (age 64) Minneapolis, Minnesota, U.S.
- Party: Republican
- Spouse: Sally Stanek
- Children: 2
- Education: University of Minnesota (BA); Hamline University (MPA)

Richard W. "Rich" Stanek (born February 2, 1962) is an American politician and former law enforcement officer who served as the sheriff of the Hennepin County Sheriff's Office from 2007 to 2019.

Prior to serving as sheriff, Stanek served from 1986 to 2006 as a police officer in Minneapolis, Minnesota. Stanek served from 1995 to 2003 in the Minnesota House of Representatives. He also served from 2003 to 2004 as Commissioner of the Minnesota Department of Public Safety under then-Governor of Minnesota Tim Pawlenty. In 2018, he lost his close bid for re-election as Hennepin County sheriff to newcomer David Hutchinson by just over 2,000 votes.

Stanek was a candidate for the Republican Party's nomination for governor of Minnesota in the 2022 election.

== Early life and education ==
Stanek was born in Minneapolis, Minnesota. He earned a Bachelor of Arts degree in criminal justice from the University of Minnesota and a Master of Public Administration from Hamline University.

== Career ==
=== Police service ===
Stanek began his career in the Minneapolis Police Department in 1986 as a patrol officer. He rose in the ranks, serving as Second Precinct commander, and eventually commander of criminal investigations.

=== Minnesota House of Representatives ===
While serving as a police officer, Stanek served five terms in the Minnesota State Legislature. He was first elected to the Minnesota House of Representatives in a 1995 special election to replace Warren Limmer, who had left the House for the Minnesota Senate. Stanek was elected, and represented Maple Grove, Minnesota until 2003. He served as chair of the Crime Prevention committee from 1999 to 2001, and the chair of the Judiciary Finance committee from 2001 to 2003.

While in the legislature, Stanek wrote the Minnesota's felony DWI statute. Stanek also introduced many bills related to law enforcement, including legislation "requiring a driver's license revocation for anyone convicted of fleeing a police officer; allowing for a verdict of "guilty but mentally ill" in state courts; creating a mandatory life sentence for a second violent felony conviction; ... [and] specifying that an officer's 'use of less lethal munitions does not constitute deadly force.'" Stanek also sought funding for CODEFOR, a computerized crime-tracking system.

=== Department of Public Safety ===
In 2003, Stanek was appointed by Tim Pawlenty to serve as commissioner of public safety and director of homeland security. He resigned his seat in the Minnesota House of Representatives to assume the position and served until April 2004, when his involvement in a 1989 incident involving an alleged assault and racial slurs by Stanek created controversy.

=== Hennepin County sheriff ===
Stanek was elected Sheriff in 2006, replacing former Sheriff Pat McGowan. Sworn in on January 1, 2007, Stanek was re-elected in 2010 and again in 2014. In all three elections, Stanek was supported by some members of the African American community, who cited Stanek's willingness to admit to past mistakes, and his work with African American officers in the Minneapolis police department. In 2018, he lost his reelection bid to Dave Hutchinson by around 2,400 votes. His term ended January 7, 2019.

Stanek was on the executive committee of the National Sheriffs' Association, serving as vice president.

Stanek is a co-owner of consulting firm Public Safety Strategies Group with Julianne Ortman.

== Controversies ==
=== 35W bridge collapse video controversy ===
In 2007 Mayor R.T. Rybak and Minneapolis police chief Tim Dolan criticized Stanek for providing false information in the 26-minute video on the collapse of the I-35W Mississippi River bridge and for taking credit for actions that weren't his responsibility. The $30,000 film was funded with forfeited money earmarked for training. "His theft of the credit is not going to sit well with my staff and our hard working partners," Minneapolis police chief Tim Dolan said in an e-mail. The St. Cloud company that produced the video was the same company that handled advertising and marketing for Stanek's campaign in 2006.

=== Retaliation ===
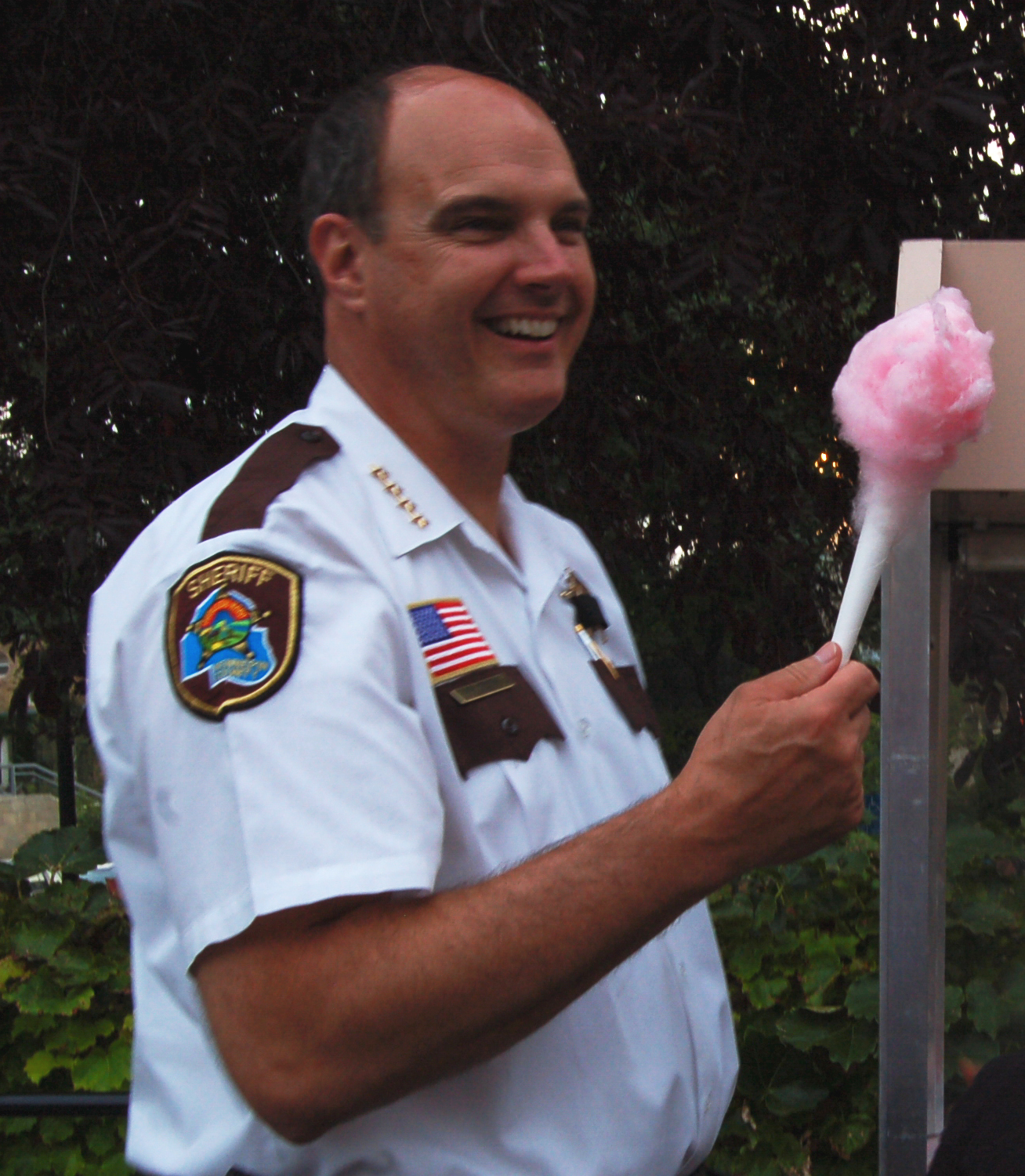
Rich Stanek in 2014

Melissa Hill, who ran a campaign against Stanek under the slogan "Kitten for Sheriff" was awarded $15,000 in a federal civil rights settlement against Hennepin County. Hennepin County paid $15,000 to Melissa Hill for allegedly trespassing at Occupy Minneapolis. Hill's attorney Jordan Kushner said that "She was arrested and put in jail for no reason but for retaliation by the sheriff for being a political activist" and that Hill saw Stanek watching her from his SUV before she was arrested. He argued that both her original trespass order and arrest were unconstitutional. Hill was a legal observer for the National Lawyers Guild at that time of the arrest. "I feel I was vindicated," said Hill. "I was arrested on a public sidewalk. This sends a strong message that they can't be misusing their trespass policy to suppress free speech."

=== Budget ===
In 2010 after his re-election Stanek was involved in a conflict with the County Board of Commissioners over his budget. The conflict, arising as the budget season kicked in, highlighted the divisions among powerful elected officials who have different views of the county's priorities at a time when budgets are being frozen and services cut. Stanek "advocates for a larger role for the Hennepin County sheriff, and he wants to be held harmless from any budget cuts," Board Chair Mike Opat said. "But public safety is done by a lot of people, not only the sheriff. The sheriff is not the generalissimo of Hennepin County."

=== Standing Rock, North Dakota ===
In October 2016, Stanek sent Hennepin County deputies and equipment to North Dakota to assist law enforcement efforts there to suppress the Dakota Access Pipeline protests at the Standing Rock Indian Reservation. The personnel sharing, under the auspices of the Emergency Management Assistance Compact, sparked protests and was met with criticism from Minneapolis City Council member Alondra Cano, state Senator Patricia Torres Ray, state Representative Peggy Flanagan, and Clyde Bellecourt.

== 2022 gubernatorial campaign ==
Stanek was a candidate for the Republican Party's nomination for governor of Minnesota in the 2022 election. He was one of six Republican candidates who sought the party's nomination to challenge incumbent Minnesota Democratic–Farmer–Labor Party Governor Tim Walz. He joined the race late, and suffered a serious car accident several weeks before the Minnesota Republican Party's endorsing convention in May 2022. Sidelined by his injuries, Stanek did not seek the party's endorsement at the convention, which went to former state Senator Scott Jensen instead.

== Personal life ==
Stanek is married and has one son and one daughter. He is Roman Catholic.

Minnesota House of Representatives
Preceded by Warren Limmer	Member of the Minnesota House of Representatives from the 33B district 1995–2003	Succeeded by Barb Sykora
Preceded by Michelle Rifenberg	Member of the Minnesota House of Representatives from the 32B district 2003	Succeeded by Kurt Zellers
