= Tony Kielkucki =

American politician

Member of the Minnesota House of Representatives from the 20B district
- In office 1997–2002

Member of the Minnesota House of Representatives from the 18A district
- In office 2003

Personal details
- Born: July 11, 1951 (age 75)
- Party: Republican
- Spouse: Lavon
- Children: 3
- Education: St. Thomas College
- Occupation: Teacher

Anthony Michael Kielkucki (born July 11, 1951) is an American politician in the state of Minnesota. He served in the Minnesota House of Representatives.
