= Madelyn Reiter =

American politician and businesswoman (1942–2020)

Member of the Minnesota Senate from the 53rd district
- In office 2001–2006

Personal details
- Born: Madelyn Lendway; October 24, 1942 Saint Paul, Minnesota, U.S.
- Died: December 28, 2020 (aged 78) Shoreview, Minnesota, U.S.
- Party: Republican
- Education: University of Minnesota (BS)

Military service
- Branch/service: United States Air Force
- Unit: Civil Air Patrol

Madelyn E. Reiter (October 24, 1942 – December 28, 2020) was an American politician and businesswoman.

== Early life and education ==
Born in Saint Paul, Minnesota, Reiter graduated from Alexander Ramsey High School. She earned a Bachelor of Science degree in business and economics at University of Minnesota.

== Career ==
Reiter served in the Civil Air Patrol. She also worked in the insurance business and lived in Shoreview, Minnesota with her husband and family. Reiter served on the Minnesota Board on Aging from 1992 to 1996 and on the Shoreview City Council from 1996 to 2000. She was a Republican. From 2001 to 2006, Reiter served in the Minnesota Senate.

== Personal life ==
Reiter died on December 28, 2020, in Shoreview, Minnesota.
