= Mike Jungbauer =

American politician

Member of the Minnesota Senate from the 48th district
- In office January 7, 2003 – January 7, 2013
- Preceded by: redrawn district
- Succeeded by: district redrawn

Personal details
- Born: February 9, 1958 (age 68) Saint Paul, Minnesota
- Party: Republican Party of Minnesota
- Spouse: Vicki
- Children: 4
- Education: Anoka-Ramsey Community College; Moody Bible Institute
- Profession: Wastewater treatment designer, pastor, legislator,

Michael J. Jungbauer (born February 9, 1958) is a Minnesota politician and former member of the Minnesota Senate representing District 48 in the northern part of the Twin Cities metropolitan area. The district included portions of Anoka and Sherburne counties. A Republican, he was first elected in 2002, and was re-elected in 2006 and 2010. Prior to becoming a senator, he was the mayor of East Bethel from 1998 to 2002.

== Overview ==
Jungbauer was a member of the Senate's Capital Investment, Commerce and Consumer Protection, Energy, Utilities, and Telecommunications, and Judiciary and Public Safety committees. His special legislative concerns included transportation, education, aviation issues, and concealed carry.

On February 18, 2005, the Minnesota Senate's Subcommittee on Ethical Conduct issued a report on Jungbauer's 2004 misuse of his Senate legislative assistant, as well as Senate communications equipment such as computers and e-mail, to publicize a partisan campaign activity on behalf of Jeffrey Davis, a Republican candidate for Minnesota Senate District 50.

In July 2007, the Minnesota Campaign Finance and Public Disclosure Board ruled that Jungbauer had knowingly accepted a campaign contribution in the form of a wholesale discount on model airplanes for his office. The Jungbauer campaign was forced to pay nearly $2,000 in fines.

On July 1, 2009, Jungbauer announced his candidacy for the 2010 Minnesota governor's race. He officially launched his campaign in Anoka on August 8, 2009.

== Claims ==
It has been alleged that certain claims he made regarding his studies and degrees may not be accurate. He "claims to have a bachelor's degree from the Moody Bible Institute with a "background in biochemistry." However, MinnPost reported on June 16, 2011, that he never graduated, and that the closest thing he has to a bachelor of science degree is a ministerial ordainment from Christian Motorsports International, which provides "chapel services" at "races, car shows, cruise-ins, and tractor pulls." His campaign website refers to "pursuing a degree in Environmental Policy at Metropolitan State University," although the school has no such program.
