= Duke Powell =

American politician

Duke Powell (born 1955) was an American paramedic politician.

Powell graduated from Minnesota State University, Mankato with an associate degree in emergency medical care and rescue. He lived in Burnsville, Minnesota with his wife and family. He served in the Minnesota House of Representatives from 2003 to 2006 and was a Republican.
