= Jim Davnie =

American politician

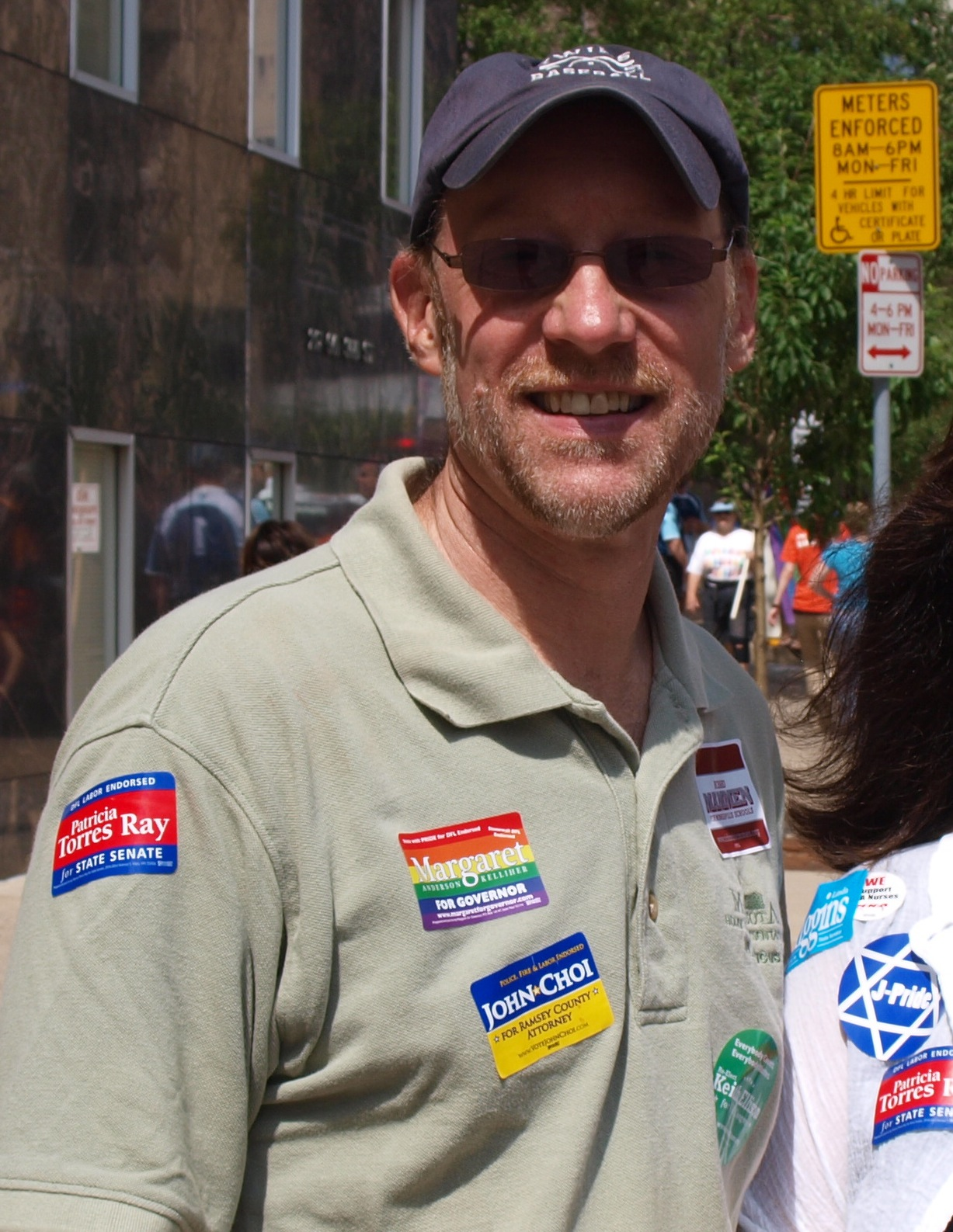

Member of the Minnesota House of Representatives from the 63A district 62A (2001–2013)
- In office January 3, 2001 – January 2023
- Preceded by: Lee Greenfield

Personal details
- Born: April 13, 1959 (age 67) Minneapolis, Minnesota
- Party: Minnesota Democratic–Farmer–Labor Party
- Spouse: Cara Letofsky
- Children: 2
- Education: University of Minnesota
- Occupation: Educator, chef, legislator

James T. Davnie (born April 13, 1959) is a Minnesota politician and former member of the Minnesota House of Representatives. A member of the Minnesota Democratic–Farmer–Labor Party (DFL), he represented District 63A, which includes portions of the city of Minneapolis in Hennepin County, which is part of the Twin Cities metropolitan area. He is also a teacher.

== Early life, education, and career ==
Davnie graduated from Bloomington Jefferson High School in Bloomington, then went to the University of Minnesota, earning his B.S. in psychology and social work in 1988 and his M.Ed. in education in 1995. He worked as a professional chef, and has been a teacher at Buffalo Community Middle School in Buffalo since 1989.

== Minnesota House of Representatives ==
Davnie was first elected in 2000. He served 11 terms in office and retired in 2022, choosing not to run for reelection.

== Personal life ==
Active in his community through the years, Davnie was a member of Minneapolis' Seward Neighborhood Group from 1996 to 2000 and was also a representative on the Community Advisory Committee for the Hiawatha Light Rail Transit. He is a past president and member of the governing board of Education Minnesota (1999–2001).
