= John Hottinger =

American politician (born 1945)

7th Minnesota Senate Majority Leader
- In office January 2003 – January 2004
- Preceded by: Roger Moe
- Succeeded by: Dean Johnson

Member of the Minnesota Senate from the 24th & 23rd district
- In office 1991–2007

Personal details
- Born: September 18, 1945 (age 81) Mankato, Minnesota, U.S.
- Party: Minnesota Democratic-Farmer-Labor Party
- Spouse: Mimi
- Children: Julie, Creight, Janna
- Education: College of St. Thomas; Georgetown University Law Center
- Occupation: Attorney

John Hottinger is a Minnesota attorney and politician and a former member and majority leader of the Minnesota Senate. First elected in 1990, he was re-elected in 1992, 1996, 2000 and 2002. A Democrat, he represented the old District 24 prior to the 2002 redistricting, and the District 23 thereafter. The district included portions of Blue Earth, Le Sueur, Nicollet, Sibley and Waseca counties in the south central part of the state.

In 1994, Hottinger ran unsuccessfully for the U.S. House and was defeated by Republican Gil Gutknecht.

Hottinger served as a majority whip from 1993 to 2000, and as an assistant majority leader during the 2001–02 biennium. He was chosen majority leader in 2003 after Senator Roger Moe retired to run for governor. After a difficult year, in which the DFL Party majority was seen to have been outmaneuvered by Republican governor Tim Pawlenty, Hottinger stepped down, turning power over to Senator Dean Johnson. In January 2004, he was selected the national legislator of the month by the Center for Policy Alternatives one month after Illinois legislator Barack Obama won the honor Hottinger has been quoted as saying the two of them have since taken "divergent" paths. The CPA praised Hottinger "…for disowning budget cuts and yet giving the GOP enough votes on the budget bills so that government would not be shut down, which would have imposed further pain on vulnerable Minnesotans and state employees." The CPA added that he had "strengthened the progressive community for battles in 2004 and beyond."

During his time in the Senate, Hottinger chaired the following committees: Health and Family Security, Rules, and Early Childhood Policy and Finance division of the Finance Committee. He also chaired the Legislative Committee to Review Administrative Rules and Senate Subcommittees on Insurance, Consumer Protection, Rulemaking, and Higher Education, Senate Budget, Personnel, Ethical Conduct, Permanent and Joint Rules, Intergovernmental Relations and Property Taxes.

Hottinger was active in the [Council of State Governments] (CSG) and chaired the [Midwestern Legislative Conference] in 2001. He became the national chair of CSG in 2004 in leadership partnership with Governor [Frank Murkowski] of Alaska, who served as CSG president. He was the first Minnesota legislator or governor to serve as the national leader of the organization other than Governor Harold Stassen, who was national president in 1941-42.

Hottinger chose not to run for re-election in 2006. In 2007, he faced disciplinary action for misusing funds from a settlement that he had won for a client in his work as an attorney. He was suspended for a minimum of 18 months, petitioned to lift the suspension on June 17, 2010 and the Minnesota Supreme Court returned him to practice on January 12, 2011 finding him "prepared and morally qualified" to practice law. The Supreme Court decision followed a hearing before the Minnesota Board of Lawyer's Professional Responsibility Board on November 18. 2010 and its unanimous decision to recommend reinstatement. There were no witnesses in opposition to the reinstatement, and Hottinger's eleven character witnesses included local attorneys and colleagues from the political world, including DFL Minneapolis mayor R.T. Rybak, former DFL senate majority leader Roger Moe, former Republican U.S. senator David Durenberger and former Republican party chair Charles "Chuck" Slocum.

After leaving the Senate, Hottinger worked for about four years as the chief consultant for some non-profit organizations funded by Minnesota-Washington philanthropist Ned Crosby: the Jefferson Center for New Democratic Process and Promoting Health Democracy in Minnesota and, on a limited basis, Health Democracy Oregon in Portland, Oregon. That work focused on Crosby's Citizen Jury process for promoting citizen engagement through deliberative democracy. Hottinger was the project director for the Citizen Jury on Election Recounts concentrating on the process used in Minnesota in the recount of the U.S. Senate race between Al Franken and Norm Coleman in 2009. Hottinger was also a leader as the initial vice president for legal and government affairs for "The Minnesota World's Fair", the organization which launched the effort to bring the World's Fair to Minnesota in 2022 or 2023.

Hottinger has been active in non-profits, including serving on the executive committee and as chair of the Northstar (Minnesota) Chapter of the Sierra Club, a member of the board and executive committee of the Northeast Midwest Institute in Washington, D.C. and as a member of the board of the Somali Justice Center in Minneapolis. Hottinger practices law, consulting on government, non-profits and the environment with Hottinger Consulting LLC in St. Paul, Minnesota.
