= Betsy Wergin =

American politician

Member of the Minnesota Senate from the 16th district
- In office January 7, 2003 – July 28, 2008
- Preceded by: Dave Kleis
- Succeeded by: Lisa Fobbe

Personal details
- Born: March 4, 1952 (age 74) Princeton, Minnesota, U.S.
- Party: Republican

Betsy Wergin (born March 4, 1952) is an American politician who served in the Minnesota Senate from the 16th district from 2003 to 2008.

She is the sister of former chairman of the Minnesota Public Utilities Commission and member of the Minnesota House of Representatives from 1991 to 1997, Leroy Koppendrayer.
