= Jim Knoblach =

American politician

Member of the Minnesota House of Representatives from the 14B district 16B (1995–2003), 15A (2003–2007)
- In office January 6, 2015 – January 7, 2019
- Preceded by: Zach Dorholt
- Succeeded by: Dan Wolgamott
- In office January 3, 1995 – January 2, 2007
- Preceded by: Dave Gruenes
- Succeeded by: Steve Gottwalt

Personal details
- Born: November 5, 1957 (age 68) St. Cloud, Minnesota
- Party: Republican Party of Minnesota
- Spouse: Janet
- Children: 2
- Education: Saint John's University (B.S.); Harvard University (M.B.A.); Georgetown University (M.A.)
- Occupation: Landlord

Jim Knoblach (born November 5, 1957) is an American politician and former member of the Minnesota House of Representatives. A member of the Republican Party of Minnesota, he represented District 14B in central Minnesota.

== Early life and education ==
Knoblach was born and raised in St. Cloud, Minnesota. He attended local public schools and graduated from Apollo High School in 1976. He attended St. Cloud State University and Saint John's University, graduating in 1979 with a B.S. in economics and business administration. He also obtained a Certified Public Accountant license in 1979. He was then accepted at Harvard Business School, where he graduated with a M.B.A. in 1981. He later attended Georgetown University, graduating with a M.A. in American government in 1987, and also interned with U.S. Senator Dave Durenberger.

== Minnesota House of Representatives ==
Knoblach was first elected to the Minnesota House of Representatives in 1994 and served until early 2007 after declining to run in the 2006 election. During his years in office Knoblach chaired the House Capital Investment Committee for two terms (1999–2002) and the House Ways and Means Committee for two terms (2003–06). Knoblach also chaired the House Republican Election Committee from 1997 to 2001. Knoblach was also an Assistant Majority Leader from 1998 to 2002.

In 2006, Knoblach ran for the Republican nomination for Minnesota's 6th congressional district and sought the party endorsement, but came in second of four to Michele Bachmann, who was then elected to Congress later that year. In 2014, Knoblach ran for State Representative in a different, more Democratic-leaning district, and narrowly defeated incumbent Zach Dorholt of District 14B, in what was then the most expensive State Representative race in Minnesota history. Knoblach was then named to again chair the House Ways and Means Committee.

=== Allegations ===
In September 2018, Knoblach dropped his reelection bid after MPR News reported that his daughter Laura alleged he had touched her inappropriately between the ages of 9 and 21. In an interview, Knoblach's attorney denied the allegations. A 2017 investigation of the allegations by local law enforcement resulted in no charges. St. Cloud police officer Trent Fischer called Knoblach's actions "really inappropriate but not criminal" as Knoblach did not expose himself or touch his daughter under her clothes.

== Personal life ==
Knoblach and his wife, Janet, married in 1988. They have two children and reside in St. Cloud. He serves on the St. Cloud Salvation Army Advisory Board, the Big Brothers Big Sisters Advisory Board, and is a member of the St. Cloud Rotary. He was previously a member of the St. John's University Board of Regents, the Board of the Saint Cloud Christian School, the Board of the Central Minnesota Council Boy Scouts of America, and several other boards.
