= Joe Opatz =

American politician

Member of the Minnesota House of Representatives from the 15B district
- In office 2003–2005

Member of the Minnesota House of Representatives from the 16A district
- In office 1993–2002

Personal details
- Born: July 23, 1952 (age 74) St. Cloud, Minnesota, U.S.
- Party: Minnesota Democratic–Farmer–Labor Party
- Spouse: Pamela Steckman
- Children: two
- Education: St. Cloud State University, Kent State University, University of Minnesota
- Occupation: University Administrator

Joseph Paul Opatz (born July 23, 1952) is an American politician in the state of Minnesota. He served in the Minnesota House of Representatives.
