= Ray Vandeveer =

American politician (1953–2024)

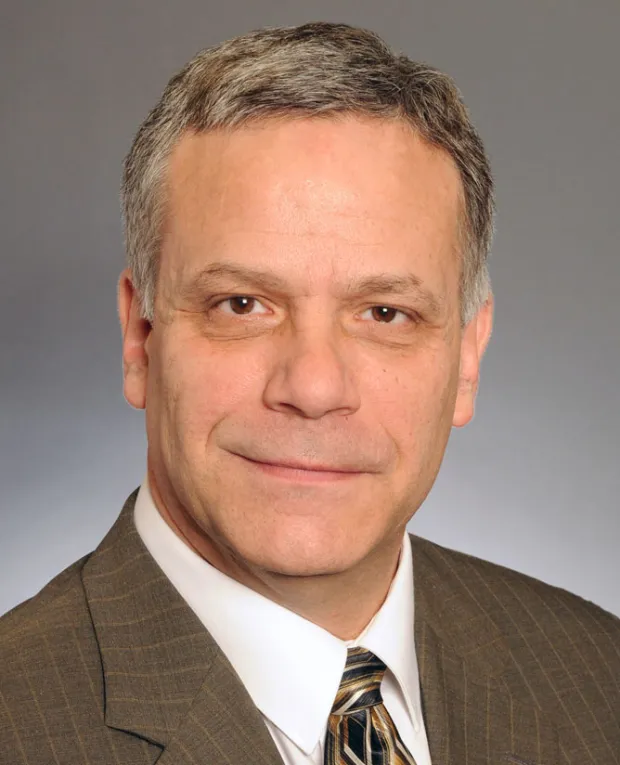
- Official portrait, 2011

Member of the Minnesota Senate from the 52nd district
- In office January 3, 2007 – January 7, 2013
- Preceded by: Michele Bachmann
- Succeeded by: district redrawn

Member of the Minnesota House of Representatives from the 51B, 52A district
- In office February 5, 1998 – January 2, 2007
- Preceded by: Doug Swenson
- Succeeded by: Bob Dettmer

Personal details
- Born: Raymond Joseph Vandeveer; July 8, 1953 Harvey, Illinois, U.S.
- Died: May 11, 2024 (aged 70) Forest Lake, Minnesota, U.S.
- Party: Republican
- Spouse: Camille
- Children: 4
- Profession: Real estate appraiser, legislator

Raymond Joseph Vandeveer (July 8, 1953 – May 11, 2024) was a Minnesota politician and member of the Minnesota Senate representing District 52, which included portions of Anoka and Washington counties in the northeastern Twin Cities metropolitan area. A Republican, he was first elected to the Senate in 2006, and was reelected in 2010.

Before being elected to the Senate, Vandeveer was a member of the Minnesota House of Representatives, representing District 52A and, before the 2002 redistricting, the old District 51B. He was first elected to the House in a January 1998 special election after Representative Doug Swenson was appointed a district judge by Governor Arne Carlson. He was reelected that November and again in 2000, 2002 and 2004. He chaired the House Taxes Subcommittee for the Property and Local Tax Division during the 2005-06 legislative session.

Vandeveer was chair of the Senate Local Government and Elections Committee, and was also a member of the Senate Commerce and Consumer Protection and the Senate Energy, Utilities and Telecommunications committees. His special legislative concerns included taxes, education, transportation, and crime prevention.

Vandeveer was a real estate appraiser by profession. He graduated from Columbia Heights High School in Columbia Heights, then went on to St. Cloud State University in St. Cloud, where he earned a B.S. in marketing in 1975. He was a former member of the Forest Lake Planning Commission and of the Mounds View Charter Commission. He was a member of the Greater Minneapolis Area Board of Realtors. He died on May 11, 2024.
