= Kurt Zellers =

American politician

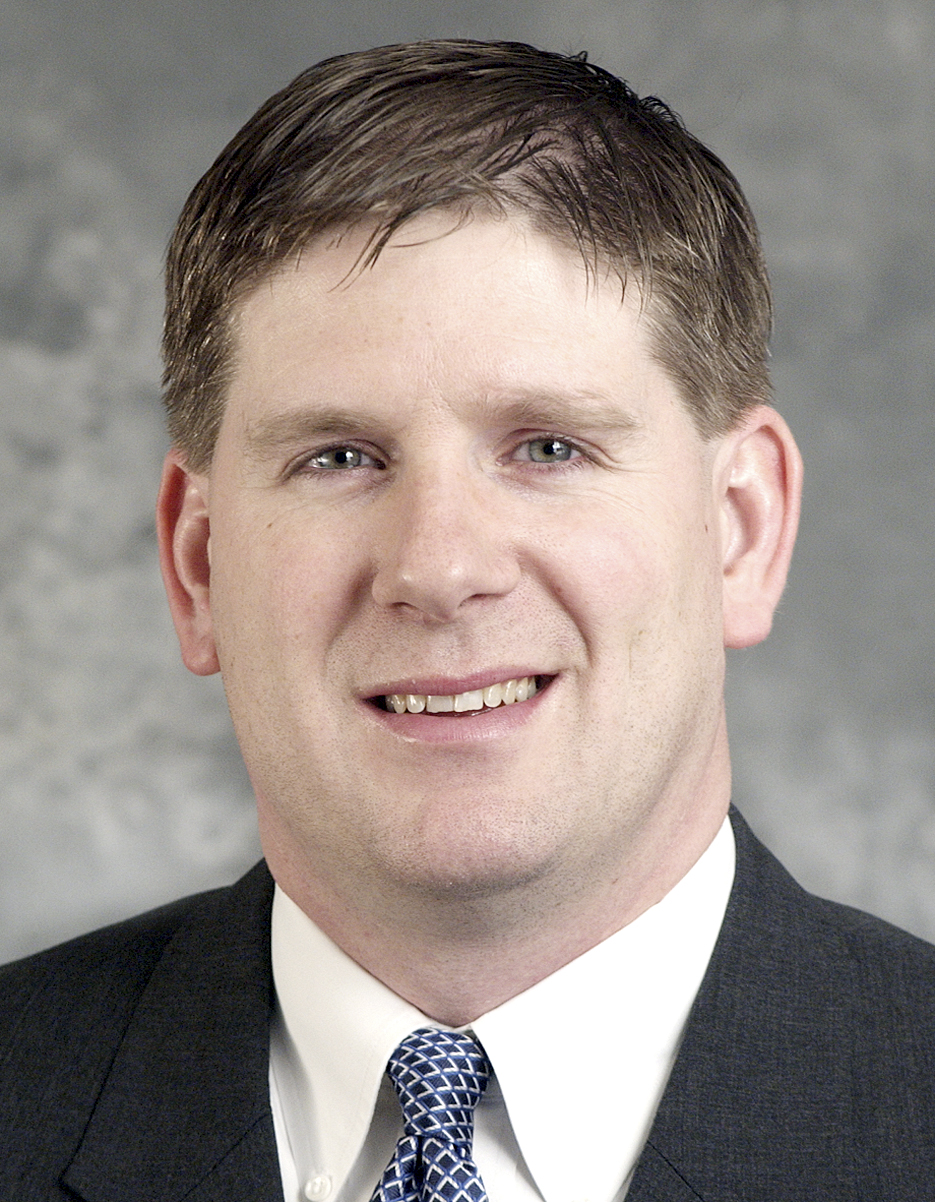

58th Speaker of the Minnesota House of Representatives
- In office January 4, 2011 – January 7, 2013
- Preceded by: Margaret Anderson Kelliher
- Succeeded by: Paul Thissen

Minority Leader of the Minnesota House of Representatives
- In office June 23, 2009 – January 3, 2011
- Preceded by: Marty Seifert
- Succeeded by: Paul Thissen

Member of the Minnesota House of Representatives
- In office March 3, 2003 – January 5, 2015
- Preceded by: Rich Stanek
- Succeeded by: Dennis Smith
- Constituency: District 32B (2003–13); District 34B (2013–15)

Personal details
- Born: October 16, 1969 (age 56) Grand Forks, North Dakota, U.S.
- Party: Republican
- Spouse: Kimberly
- Children: 2
- Education: University of North Dakota (BS)

Kurt Zellers (born October 16, 1969) is an American politician who served as speaker of the Minnesota House of Representatives from 2011 to 2013 and minority leader from 2009 to 2011. A member of the Republican Party of Minnesota, he represented the 34B district in Hennepin County. He was a candidate in the 2014 Minnesota gubernatorial election, losing in the Republican primary.

== Early life, education, and career ==
Zellers was born in Grand Forks, North Dakota and raised on a farm near Devils Lake, graduating from Devils Lake Central High School in 1988. He received a Bachelor of Science degree in political science from the University of North Dakota, where he was a member of the UND football team.

== Career ==
He worked as communications director for U.S. Senator Rod Grams from 1994 to 2000, and as communications director for the Minnesota House Republican Caucus from 2000 to 2003 before being elected to the House himself. After his election, he took a position as a senior account executive with a Minneapolis public relations firm.

=== Minnesota House of Representatives ===
Zellers was first elected in a special election on February 25, 2003. The seat had become vacant when Representative Rich Stanek resigned after being appointed Minnesota's Commissioner of Public Safety by Governor Tim Pawlenty. Zellers has been reelected in every election since then.

Zellers became an assistant majority leader in 2003 and, after House control was won by the Minnesota Democratic–Farmer–Labor Party (DFL) in the 2006 elections, continued as an assistant minority leader. During the 2009 to 2010 legislative biennium, he was a member of the House Commerce and Labor Committee and the Taxes Committee. He also served on the Commerce and Labor Subcommittee for the Labor and Consumer Protection Division, and on the Finance Subcommittee for the Transportation and Transit Policy and Oversight Division.

On June 23, 2009, Zellers was elected by the House Republican Caucus to succeed Representative Marty Seifert as Minority Leader. Seifert had stepped down to focus on a potential campaign for governor. On November 6, 2010, Zellers was selected by his caucus to serve as Speaker of the Minnesota House of Representatives for the 2011 to 2012 legislative session.

On February 24, 2014, Zellers announced that he would not seek reelection to the House, in order to concentrate on his gubernatorial campaign. He was succeeded by Dennis Smith on January 6, 2015.

=== 2014 Minnesota gubernatorial campaign ===
On June 23, 2013, Zellers announced his candidacy in the 2014 Minnesota gubernatorial election. He was defeated in the Republican primary on August 12, 2014, by the party's endorsed candidate, Jeff Johnson.

Political offices
Preceded by Marty Seifert	Minority Leader of the Minnesota House of Representatives; 2009–2011	Succeeded by Paul Thissen
Preceded by Margaret Anderson Kelliher	Speaker of the Minnesota House of Representatives; 2011–2013	Succeeded by Paul Thissen
Minnesota House of Representatives
Preceded by Rich Stanek	Member of the House of Representatives from District 34B; 32B (2003–2013); 2003 – January 5, 2015	Succeeded by Dennis Smith
