= Chris Gerlach =

American politician

Member of the Minnesota Senate from the 37th district
- In office July 21, 2004 – January 7, 2013
- Preceded by: David Knutson
- Succeeded by: district redrawn

Member of the Minnesota House of Representatives from the 36A, 37A district
- In office January 5, 1999 – July 21, 2004
- Preceded by: Eileen Tompkins
- Succeeded by: Lloyd Cybart

Personal details
- Born: November 17, 1964 (age 61)
- Party: Republican Party of Minnesota
- Education: University of St. Thomas; University of South Dakota
- Occupation: Real-estate agent, businessman, legislator, veteran

Chris Gerlach (born November 17, 1964) is a Minnesota politician and former member of the Minnesota Senate representing District 37, which included portions of the cities of Apple Valley, Burnsville and Rosemount in Dakota County, which is located in the southeastern Twin Cities metropolitan area.

== Public service ==
A Republican, Gerlach was first elected to the Senate in a July 2004 special election after Senator David Knutson was appointed a Dakota County District Court judge by Governor Tim Pawlenty. He was re-elected in 2006 and 2010. He served as an assistant minority leader from 2005 to 2006 and 2008 to 2010.

Prior to being elected to the Senate, Gerlach was a member of the Minnesota House of Representatives, being first elected in 1998 in the old House District 36A, and re-elected in 2000 and 2002. After the 2002 redistricting, the area was known as House District 37A.

Gerlach served as assistant majority leader and Majority Whip in the Senate from January through December 2011. He chairs the Senate Commerce and Consumer Protection Committee, and is also a member of the Senate's Capital Investment, Environment and Natural Resources, and Rules and Administration committees. His special legislative concerns included tax relief, less government spending, education reform, and public safety.

Gerlach supports "right-to-work" legislation in Minnesota. In March 2012, he used his bulk-mail business to send mail to several fellow senators' constituents to pressure them to support the measure. Democrats in the Minnesota Senate considered filing an ethics complaint against Gerlach. Senator Tom Bakk said Gerlach "[seemed] to be benefiting by the action of the caucus in a way the general public is not." Ortman called Gerlach's decision to use his business to mail against other Senators "shocking" and "very troublesome and should be troubling to all Minnesotans."

Days after news broke that he used his bulk-mail business to mail against other senators, Gerlach announced that he would not seek re-election to the Minnesota Senate.

On May 19, 2012, Gerlach announced he would be running for the Dakota County Board of Commissioners in 2012.

Gerlach's involvement in the termination of a former employee of the Minnesota Senate, Michael Brodkorb, has come under scrutiny due to a pending lawsuit by Brodkorb. Gerlach and an aide in his Senate office, Aaron Cocking, were listed in initial paperwork regarding Brodkorb's planned lawsuit over his termination from the Minnesota Senate. On May 25, 2012, the Minnesota Senate released legal bills showing they had spent $46,150 in the first 3 months of 2012 to prepare a defense to Brodkorb's suit.

On June 19, 2012, the Minnesota Senate announced additional legal bills in the amount of $38,533, bringing the total legal costs incurred by the Minnesota Senate due to the termination of Brodkorb to almost $85,000 since the end of the May 2012.

== Community involvement ==
Long active in his local community, he is a member of Apple Valley American Legion Post 1776, where he serves as the Post Chairmen of the boys state youth in government program. He has been a member of the Civil Air Patrol for forty years. As a teenager, he earned the General Carl A. Spaatz Award, of which only 2000 members have earned since its inception in 1964. He is still a member of the Civil Air Patrol, and three local Chamber of Commerce. He has also served on the Dakota County Human Services Advisory Committee and as a board member of the Apple Valley Optimist Club – a service organization dedicated to fostering a wide range of youth programs. As his son has grown, Chris Gerlach has become active in the Westview Elementary Cub Scout Pack 205. His family attends Berean Baptist Church in Burnsville.

== Personal ==
As the youngest of six children to Don and Marlene Gerlach, he was amongst the first to arrive in the Lebanon Township – soon to become the City of Apple Valley. His late father had long ago retired from the civil service with the St. Paul Army Corps of Engineers and his mother has now retired after a 45-year career as a registered nurse. He attended Westview Elementary School, Valley Middle School and graduated from Apple Valley High School in 1983.

Chris Gerlach was introduced to public service and the military early on as a Civil Air Patrol Cadet at age 13, ultimately earning top leadership awards and rank within the cadet program. This set him on a course to the University of St. Thomas in Saint Paul, where he received a BA in political science. Before graduation, however, he was fortunate to land an internship with U.S. Senator Rudy Boschwitz. This experience over ten months spent in St. Paul and Washington D.C. furthered his interest in public policy and public service. Chris Gerlach then joined the United States Air Force, and was a lieutenant and intercontinental ballistic missile crew commander at Ellsworth Air Force Base. He later earned his M.B.A. at the University of South Dakota in Vermillion, South Dakota. By the early 1990s, the Cold War was over and the world was changing. He was promoted to the rank of Captain and was working as a crew commander deactivating the weapon systems he had once worked to maintain on constant alert status.

In 1993, he made the decision to return to civilian life and move back to Apple Valley with the desire to get back involved in politics as a way to make a difference in people's lives.

He and his wife, Shelli, live in Apple Valley, and have two children. He owns and operates a direct marketing and bulk mail processing business in Eagan.
