= 86th Minnesota Legislature =

2009 to 2010 legislative session

Eighty-sixth Minnesota Legislature
←	85th	87th	→
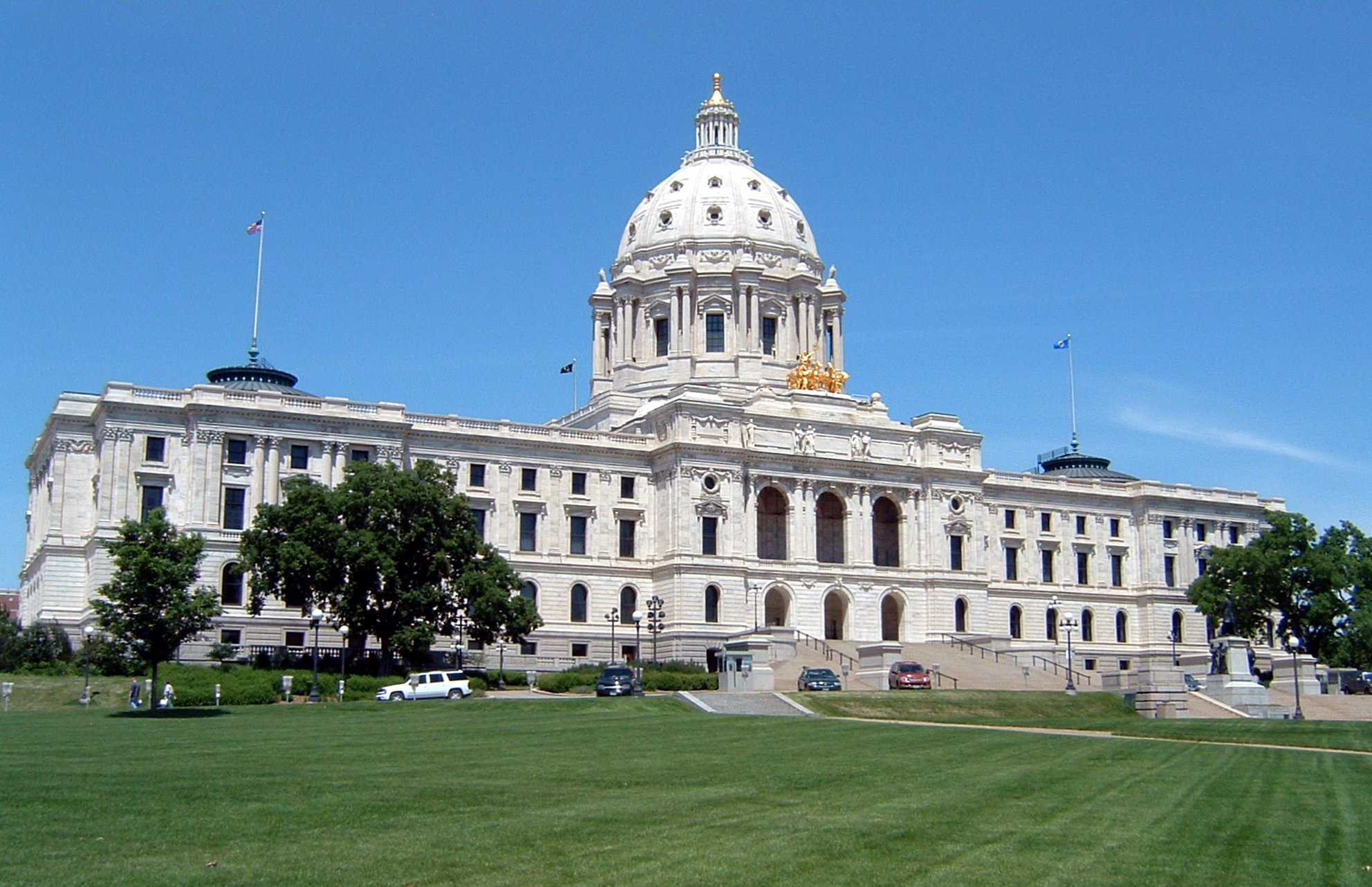

Overview
- Legislative body: Minnesota Legislature
- Jurisdiction: Minnesota, United States
- Meeting place: Minnesota State Capitol
- Term: January 6, 2009 – January 4, 2011
- Election: 2008 general election
- Website: www.leg.state.mn.us

Minnesota State Senate
- Members: 67 senators
- President: James Metzen
- Majority Leader: Lawrence Pogemiller
- Minority Leader: David Senjem
- Party control: Democratic-Farmer-Labor Party

Minnesota House of Representatives
- Members: 134 Representatives
- Speaker: Margaret Anderson Kelliher
- Majority Leader: Anthony Sertich
- Minority Leader: Marty Seifert, Kurt Zellers
- Party control: Democratic-Farmer-Labor Party

The eighty-sixth Minnesota Legislature first convened on January 6, 2009 and ended upon the beginning of the next Legislature in January 2011. The 67 members of the Minnesota Senate were elected during the 2006 general election, and the 134 members of the Minnesota House of Representatives were elected during the 2008 general election.

== Sessions ==
Two special sessions were held. The first was for several hours on May 17, 2010, to complete a budget bill. The second special session was held October 18, 2010, to provide disaster relief to flood areas in Southern Minnesota.

== Party summary ==
Resignations and new members are discussed in the "Membership changes" section, below.

=== Senate ===
	Party (Shading indicates majority caucus)		Total	Vacant
	DFL	GOP	Total	Vacant
End of previous Legislature	44	21	65	2
Begin	46	21	67	0
January 8, 2010	46	20	66	1
January 26, 2010	46	21	67	0
Latest voting share	69%	31%		
Beginning of the next Legislature	30	37	67	0

=== House of Representatives ===
	Party (Shading indicates majority caucus)		Total	Vacant
	DFL	GOP	Total	Vacant
End of previous Legislature	85	49	134	0
Begin	87	47	134	0
Latest voting share	65%	35%		
Beginning of the next Legislature	62	72	134	0

== Leadership ==
=== Senate ===
President of the Senate
James Metzen (DFL-South St. Paul)

Senate Majority Leader
Lawrence Pogemiller (DFL-Minneapolis)

Senate Minority Leader
David Senjem (R-Rochester)

=== House of Representatives ===
Speaker of the House
Margaret Anderson Kelliher (DFL-Minneapolis)

House Majority Leader
Anthony Sertich (DFL-Chisholm)

House Minority Leader
Until June 24, 2009 Marty Seifert (R-Marshall)
From June 24, 2009 Kurt Zellers (R-Maple Grove)

== House members ==
=== Members, 2009-2010 ===
District	Name	Party	Residence
1A	Dave Olin	DFL	Thief River Falls
1B	Bernard Lieder	DFL	Crookston
2A	Kent Eken	DFL	Twin Valley
2B	Brita Sailer	DFL	Park Rapids
3A	Tom Anzelc	DFL	Balsam Township
3B	Loren Solberg	DFL	Grand Rapids
4A	John Persell	DFL	Bemidji
4B	Larry Howes	Rep	Walker
5A	Tom Rukavina	DFL	Virginia
5B	Anthony Sertich	DFL	Chisholm
6A	David Dill	DFL	Crane Lake
6B	Mary Murphy	DFL	Hermantown
7A	Thomas Huntley	DFL	Duluth
7B	Roger Reinert	DFL	Duluth
8A	Bill Hilty	DFL	Finlayson
8B	Tim Faust	DFL	Hinckley
9A	Morrie Lanning	Rep	Moorhead
9B	Paul Marquart	DFL	Dilworth
10A	Bud Nornes	Rep	Fergus Falls
10B	Mark Murdock	Rep	Ottertail
11A	Torrey Westrom	Rep	Elbow Lake
11B	Mary Ellen Otremba	DFL	Long Prairie
12A	John Ward	DFL	Brainerd
12B	Al Doty	DFL	Royalton
13A	Paul Anderson	Rep	Starbuck
13B	Al Juhnke	DFL	Willmar
14A	Dan Severson	Rep	Sauk Rapids
14B	Larry Hosch	DFL	St. Joseph
15A	Steve Gottwalt	Rep	St. Cloud
15B	Larry Haws	DFL	St. Cloud
16A	Gail Kulick Jackson	DFL	Milaca
16B	Mary Kiffmeyer	Rep	Big Lake
17A	Rob Eastlund	Rep	Isanti
17B	Jeremy Kalin	DFL	North Branch
18A	Ron Shimanski	Rep	Silver Lake
18B	Dean Urdahl	Rep	Grove City
19A	Bruce Anderson	Rep	Buffalo Township
19B	Tom Emmer	Rep	Delano
20A	Andrew Falk	DFL	Murdock
20B	Lyle Koenen	DFL	Clara City
21A	Marty Seifert	Rep	Marshall
21B	Paul Torkelson	Rep	St. James
22A	Doug Magnus	Rep	Slayton
22B	Rod Hamilton	Rep	Mountain Lake
23A	Terry Morrow	DFL	St. Peter
23B	Kathy Brynaert	DFL	Mankato
24A	Bob Gunther	Rep	Fairmont
24B	Tony Cornish	Rep	Good Thunder
25A	Laura Brod	Rep	New Prague
25B	David Bly	DFL	Northfield
26A	Kory Kath	DFL	Owatonna
26B	Patti Fritz	DFL	Faribault
27A	Robin Brown	DFL	Moscow Township
27B	Jeanne Poppe	DFL	Austin
28A	Tim Kelly	Rep	Red Wing
28B	Steve Drazkowski	Rep	Wabasha
29A	Randy Demmer	Rep	Hayfield
29B	Kim Norton	DFL	Rochester
30A	Tina Liebling	DFL	Rochester
30B	Andy Welti	DFL	Plainview
31A	Gene Pelowski	DFL	Winona
31B	Greg Davids	Rep	Preston
32A	Joyce Peppin	Rep	Rogers
32B	Kurt Zellers	Rep	Maple Grove
33A	Steve Smith	Rep	Mound
33B	Connie Doepke	Rep	Wayzata
34A	Paul Kohls	Rep	Victoria
34B	Joe Hoppe	Rep	Chaska
35A	Michael Beard	Rep	Shakopee
35B	Mark Buesgens	Rep	Jordan
36A	Mary Liz Holberg	Rep	Lakeville
36B	Pat Garofalo	Rep	Farmington
37A	Tara Mack	Rep	Apple Valley
37B	Phil Sterner	DFL	Rosemount
38A	Sandra Masin	DFL	Eagan
38B	Mike Obermueller	DFL	Eagan
39A	Rick Hansen	DFL	South Saint Paul
39B	Joe Atkins	DFL	Inver Grove Heights
40A	Will Morgan	DFL	Burnsville
40B	Ann Lenczewski	DFL	Bloomington
41A	Keith Downey	Rep	Edina
41B	Paul Rosenthal	DFL	Edina
42A	Maria Ruud	DFL	Minnetonka
42B	Jenifer Loon	Rep	Eden Prairie
43A	Sarah Anderson	Rep	Plymouth
43B	John Benson	DFL	Minnetonka
44A	Steve Simon	DFL	St. Louis Park
44B	Ryan Winkler	DFL	Golden Valley
45A	Sandra Peterson	DFL	New Hope
45B	Lyndon Carlson	DFL	Brooklyn Center
46A	Michael Nelson	DFL	Brooklyn Park
46B	Debra Hilstrom	DFL	Brooklyn Center
47A	Denise Dittrich	DFL	Champlin
47B	Melissa Hortman	DFL	Brooklyn Park
48A	Tom Hackbarth	Rep	Cedar
48B	Jim Abeler	Rep	Anoka
49A	Peggy Scott	Rep	Andover
49B	Jerry Newton	DFL	Coon Rapids
50A	Carolyn Laine	DFL	Columbia Heights
50B	Kate Knuth	DFL	New Brighton
51A	Tim Sanders	Rep	Blaine
51B	Tom Tillberry	DFL	Fridley
52A	Bob Dettmer	Rep	Forest Lake
52B	Matt Dean	Rep	Dellwood
53A	Paul Gardner	DFL	Shoreview
53B	Carol McFarlane	Rep	White Bear Lake
54A	Mindy Greiling	DFL	Roseville
54B	Bev Scalze	DFL	Little Canada
55A	Leon Lillie	DFL	North Saint Paul
55B	Nora Slawik	DFL	Maplewood
56A	Julie Bunn	DFL	Lake Elmo
56B	Marsha Swails	DFL	Woodbury
57A	Karla Bigham	DFL	Cottage Grove
57B	Denny McNamara	Rep	Hastings
58A	Joe Mullery	DFL	Minneapolis
58B	Bobby Joe Champion	DFL	Minneapolis
59A	Diane Loeffler	DFL	Minneapolis
59B	Phyllis Kahn	DFL	Minneapolis
60A	Margaret Anderson Kelliher	DFL	Minneapolis
60B	Frank Hornstein	DFL	Minneapolis
61A	Karen Clark	DFL	Minneapolis
61B	Jeff Hayden	DFL	Minneapolis
62A	Jim Davnie	DFL	Minneapolis
62B	Jean Wagenius	DFL	Minneapolis
63A	Paul Thissen	DFL	Minneapolis
63B	Linda Slocum	DFL	Richfield
64A	Erin Murphy	DFL	Saint Paul
64B	Michael Paymar	DFL	Saint Paul
65A	Cy Thao	DFL	Saint Paul
65B	Carlos Mariani	DFL	Saint Paul
66A	John Lesch	DFL	Saint Paul
66B	Alice Hausman	DFL	Saint Paul
67A	Tim Mahoney	DFL	Saint Paul
67B	Sheldon Johnson	DFL	Saint Paul

== Senate members ==
=== Members: 2009-2010 ===
District	Name	Party	Residence	First elected
1	LeRoy A. Stumpf	DFL	Thief River Falls	1982
2	Rod Skoe	DFL	Clearbrook	2002
3	Tom Saxhaug	DFL	Grand Rapids	2002
4	Mary Olson	DFL	Bemidji	2006
5	Dave Tomassoni	DFL	Chisholm	2000
6	Tom Bakk	DFL	Cook	2002
7	Yvonne Prettner Solon	DFL	Duluth	2002
8	Tony Lourey	DFL	Kerrick	2006
9	Keith Langseth	DFL	Glyndon	1980
10	Dan Skogen	DFL	Hewitt	2006
11	Bill Ingebrigtsen	Rep	Alexandria	2006
12	Paul Koering	Rep	Fort Ripley	2002
13	Joe Gimse	Rep	Willmar	2006
14	Michelle Fischbach	Rep	Paynesville	1996
15	Tarryl Clark	DFL	St. Cloud	2006
16	Lisa Fobbe	DFL	Zimmerman	2008
17	Rick Olseen	DFL	Harris	2006
18	Steve Dille	Rep	Dassel	1992
19	Amy Koch	Rep	Buffalo	2006
20	Gary Kubly	DFL	Granite Falls	2002
21	Dennis Frederickson	Rep	New Ulm	1982
22	Jim Vickerman	DFL	Tracy	1986
23	Kathy Sheran	DFL	Mankato	2006
24	Julie Rosen	Rep	Fairmont	2002
25	Kevin Dahle	DFL	Northfield	2008
26	Mike Parry	Rep	Waseca	2010
27	Dan Sparks	DFL	Austin	2002
28	Steve Murphy	DFL	Red Wing	1992
29	David Senjem	Rep	Rochester	2002
30	Ann Lynch	DFL	Rochester	2006
31	Sharon Erickson Ropes	DFL	Winona	2006
32	Warren Limmer	Rep	Maple Grove	1994
33	Gen Olson	Rep	Minnetrista	1982
34	Julianne Ortman	Rep	Chanhassen	2002
35	Claire Robling	Rep	Jordan	1996
36	Pat Pariseau	Rep	Farmington	1988
37	Chris Gerlach	Rep	Apple Valley	2004
38	Jim Carlson	DFL	Eagan	2006
39	James Metzen	DFL	South Saint Paul	1986
40	John Doll	DFL	Burnsville	2006
41	Geoff Michel	Rep	Edina	2002
42	David Hann	Rep	Eden Prairie	2002
43	Terri Bonoff	DFL	Hopkins	2004
44	Ron Latz	DFL	St. Louis Park	2006
45	Ann Rest	DFL	New Hope	2000
46	Linda Scheid	DFL	Brooklyn Park	1996
47	Leo Foley	DFL	Coon Rapids	1996
48	Mike Jungbauer	Rep	East Bethel	2002
49	Debbie Johnson	Rep	Ham Lake	2000
50	Satveer Chaudhary	DFL	Fridley	2000
51	Don Betzold	DFL	Fridley	1992
52	Ray Vandeveer	Rep	Forest Lake	2006
53	Sandy Rummel	DFL	White Bear Lake	2006
54	John Marty	DFL	Roseville	1986
55	Charles Wiger	DFL	Maplewood	1996
56	Kathy Saltzman	DFL	Woodbury	2006
57	Katie Sieben	DFL	Newport	2006
58	Linda Higgins	DFL	Minneapolis	1996
59	Lawrence Pogemiller	DFL	Minneapolis	1982
60	D. Scott Dibble	DFL	Minneapolis	2002
61	Linda Berglin	DFL	Minneapolis	1980
62	Patricia Torres Ray	DFL	Minneapolis	2006
63	Ken Kelash	DFL	Minneapolis	2008
64	Dick Cohen	DFL	Saint Paul	1986
65	Sandy Pappas	DFL	Saint Paul	1990
66	Ellen Anderson	DFL	Saint Paul	1992
67	Mee Moua	DFL	Saint Paul	2002

== Membership changes ==
=== Senate ===
District	Vacated by	Reason for change	Successor	Date successor elected
26	Dick Day (R)	Resigned January 8, 2010 to head Racino Now and lobby for slots at the state's two horse-racing tracks.	Mike Parry (R)	January 26, 2010

Preceded by Eighty-fifth Minnesota Legislature	Eighty-sixth Minnesota Legislature; 2009—2010	Succeeded by Eighty-seventh Minnesota Legislature
