= 2010 Minnesota House of Representatives election =

- November 2, 2010

All 134 seats in the Minnesota House of Representatives 68 seats needed for a majority
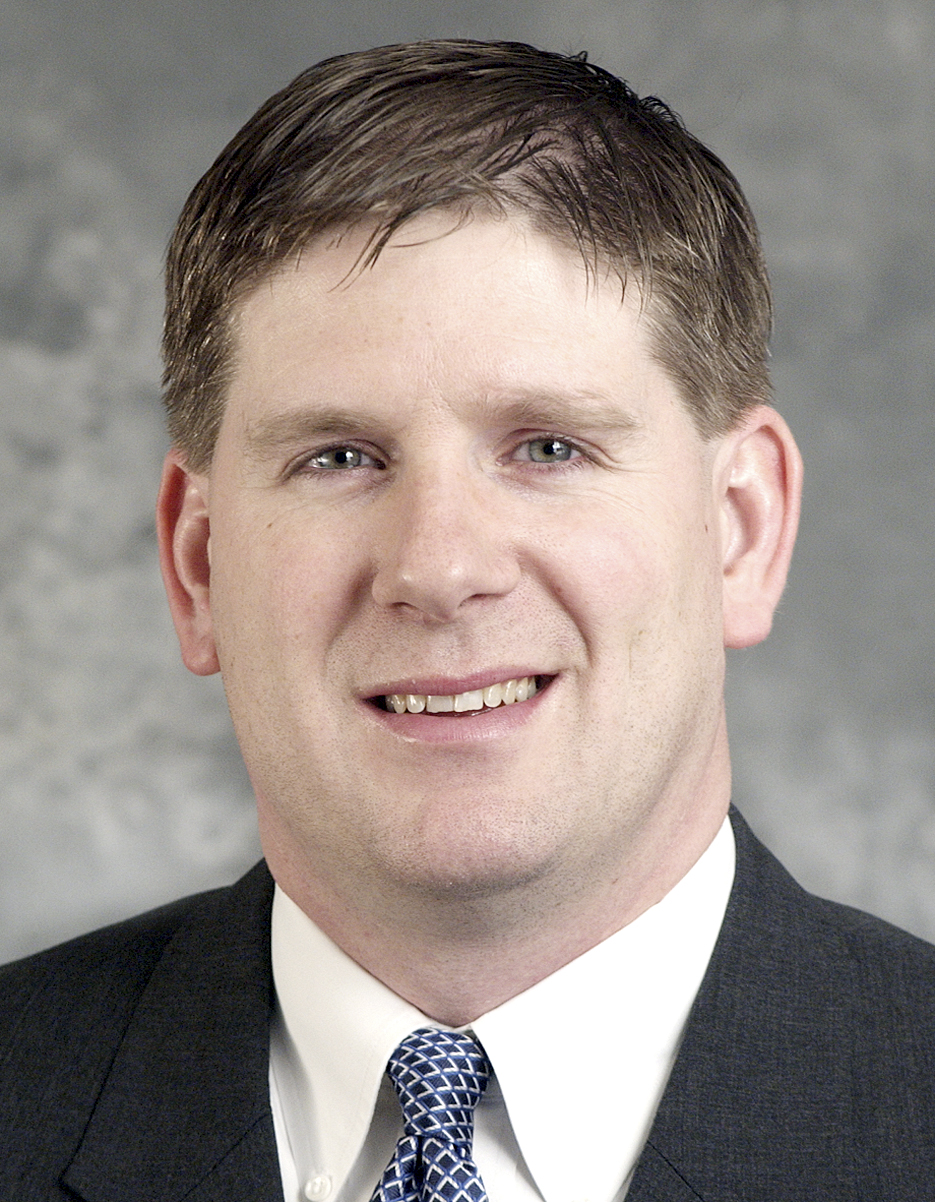

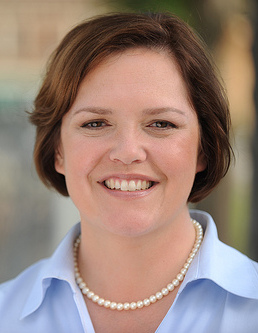
	Majority party	Minority party
Leader	Kurt Zellers	Margaret Anderson Kelliher (retired)
Party	Republican	Democratic (DFL)
Leader since	June 23, 2009	June 20, 2006
Leader's seat	32B–Maple Grove	60A–Minneapolis
Last election	47 seats, 43.81%	87 seats, 54.87%
Seats won	72	62
Seat change	▲25	▼25
Popular vote	1,036,019	995,853
Percentage	50.44%	48.49%
Swing	▲6.63 pp	▼6.38 pp
Speaker before election
Margaret Anderson Kelliher
Democratic (DFL)
Elected Speaker
Kurt Zellers
Republican

The 2010 Minnesota House of Representatives election was held in the U.S. state of Minnesota on November 2, 2010, to elect members to the House of Representatives of the 87th Minnesota Legislature. A primary election was held in several districts on August 10, 2010.

The Republican Party of Minnesota won a majority of seats, defeating the Minnesota Democratic–Farmer–Labor Party (DFL), which had a majority since defeating the Republicans in the 2006 election. The new Legislature convened on January 4, 2011.

== Predictions ==
Source	Ranking	As of
Governing	Lean D	November 1, 2010

== Results ==
Districts won

Summary of the November 2, 2010 Minnesota House of Representatives election results
Party	Candidates	Votes			Seats		
Party	Candidates	No.	%	∆pp	No.	∆No.	%
Republican Party of Minnesota	134	1,036,019	50.44	▲6.63	72	▲25	53.73
Minnesota Democratic–Farmer–Labor Party	130	995,853	48.49	▼6.38	62	▼25	46.27
Independence Party of Minnesota	10	12,358	0.60	▲0.07	0	Steady	0.00
Constitution Party of Minnesota	3	1,525	0.07	▲0.07	0	Steady	0.00
Green Party of Minnesota	1	1,035	0.05	▼0.19	0	Steady	0.00
Independent	2	3,416	0.17	▼0.18	0	Steady	0.00
Write-in	N/A	3,631	0.18	▼0.03	0	Steady	0.00
Totals		2,053,837	100.00	±0.00	134	±0	100.00
Invalid/blank votes		69,532	3.27	▼2.11			
Turnout (out of 3,803,192 eligible voters)		2,123,369	55.83	▼22.28			
Source: Minnesota Secretary of State, Minnesota Legislative Reference Library

=== Match-up summary ===
District	Incumbent	2010 Status	DFL	Republican	Independence	Independent	Result
1A	Dave Olin	Re-election	Dave Olin	Dan Fabian			GOP Gain
1B	Bernard Lieder	Re-election	Bernard Lieder	Debra Kiel			GOP Gain
2A	Kent Eken	Re-election	Kent Eken	Steve Green			DFL Hold
2B	Brita Sailer	Re-election	Brita Sailer	David Hancock			GOP Gain
3A	Tom Anzelc	Re-election	Tom Anzelc	Marv Ott			DFL Hold
3B	Loren Solberg	Re-election	Loren Solberg	Carolyn McElfatrick			GOP Gain
4A	John Persell	Re-election	John Persell	Richard Lehmann			DFL Hold
4B	Larry Howes	Re-election	Meg Bye	Larry Howes			GOP Hold
5A	Tom Rukavina	Re-election	Tom Rukavina	Greg Knutson			DFL Hold
5B	Tony Sertich	Re-election	Tony Sertich	Paul Jacobson			DFL Hold
6A	David Dill	Re-election	David Dill	Jim Tuomala			DFL Hold
6B	Mary Murphy	Re-election	Mary Murphy	Keith MacDonald			DFL Hold
7A	Thomas Huntley	Re-election	Thomas Huntley	Carinda Horton			DFL Hold
7B	Roger Reinert	Open	Kerry Gauthier	Travis Silvers	Tony Salls		DFL Hold
8A	Bill Hilty	Re-election	Bill Hilty	Mark Ames			DFL Hold
8B	Tim Faust	Re-election	Tim Faust	Roger Crawford			GOP Gain
9A	Morrie Lanning	Re-election	Greg Lemke	Morrie Lanning			GOP Hold
9B	Paul Marquart	Re-election	Paul Marquart	Benjamin Gimsley			DFL Hold
10A	Bud Nornes	Re-election	Greg Stumbo	Bud Nornes			GOP Hold
10B	Mark Murdock	Re-election	Pete Phillips	Mark Murdock			GOP Hold
11A	Torrey Westrom	Re-election	Bennett Smith	Torrey Westrom	Dave Holman		GOP Hold
11B	Mary Ellen Otremba	Open	Amy Hunter	Mary Franson	Bert Pexsa		GOP Gain
12A	John Ward	Re-election	John Ward	Kevin Goedker			DFL Hold
12B	Al Doty	Re-election	Al Doty	Mike LeMieur			GOP Gain
13A	Paul Anderson	Re-election		Paul Anderson			GOP Hold
13B	Al Juhnke	Re-election	Al Juhnke	Bruce Vogel			GOP Gain
14A	Dan Severson	Open	Rob Jacobs	Tim O'Driscoll			GOP Hold
14B	Larry Hosch	Re-election	Larry Hosch	Tom Ellenbecker			DFL Hold
15A	Steve Gottwalt	Re-election	Anne C. Nolan	Steve Gottwalt			GOP Hold
15B	Larry Haws	Open	Carol Lewis	King Banaian			GOP Gain
16A	Gail Kulick Jackson	Re-election	Gail Kulick Jackson	Sondra Erickson			GOP Gain
16B	Mary Kiffmeyer	Re-election	Tom Heyd	Mary Kiffmeyer			GOP Hold
17A	Rob Eastlund	Open	Jim Godfrey	Kurt Daudt			GOP Hold
17B	Jeremy Kalin	Open	Cindy Erickson	Bob Barrett	Curtis Lendt		GOP Gain
18A	Ron Shimanski	Re-election		Ron Shimanski			GOP Hold
18B	Dean Urdahl	Re-election	Darrin Anderson	Dean Urdahl			GOP Hold
19A	Bruce Anderson	Re-election	Barrett Chrissis	Bruce Anderson			GOP Hold
19B	Tom Emmer	Open	Chris Brazelton	Joe McDonald			GOP Hold
20A	Andrew Falk	Re-election	Andrew Falk	Jay Backer			DFL Hold
20B	Lyle Koenen	Re-election	Lyle Koenen	Brian Kohout			DFL Hold
21A	Marty Seifert	Open	Ramona Larson	Chris Swedzinski			GOP Hold
21B	Paul Torkelson	Re-election		Paul Torkelson			GOP Hold
22A	Doug Magnus	Open	Ted Winter	Joe Schomacker			GOP Hold
22B	Rod Hamilton	Re-election	William Brandt	Rod Hamilton			GOP Hold
23A	Terry Morrow	Re-election	Terry Morrow	Rebecca Peichel			DFL Hold
23B	Kathy Brynaert	Re-election	Kathy Brynaert	Dave Kruse			DFL Hold
24A	Bob Gunther	Re-election	Dale Hansen	Bob Gunther			GOP Hold
24B	Tony Cornish	Re-election	Joan Muth-Milks	Tony Cornish	Mark Meyer		GOP Hold
25A	Laura Brod	Open	Mick McGuire	Glenn Gruenhagen			GOP Hold
25B	David Bly	Re-election	David Bly	Kelby Woodard			GOP Gain
26A	Kory Kath	Re-election	Kory Kath	David Thul			DFL Hold
26B	Patti Fritz	Re-election	Patti Fritz	Dan Kaiser			DFL Hold
27A	Robin Brown	Re-election	Robin Brown	Rich Murray			GOP Gain
27B	Jeanne Poppe	Re-election	Jeanne Poppe	Jennifer Gumbel			DFL Hold
28A	Tim Kelly	Re-election	Jerry Roth	Tim Kelly			GOP Hold
28B	Steve Drazkowski	Re-election	Mark Schneider	Steve Drazkowski			GOP Hold
29A	Randy Demmer	Open	Douglas Wunderlich	Duane Quam			GOP Hold
29B	Kim Norton	Re-election	Kim Norton	Mike Rolih			DFL Hold
30A	Tina Liebling	Re-election	Tina Liebling	Charlie O'Connell			DFL Hold
30B	Andy Welti	Re-election	Andy Welti	Mike Benson			GOP Gain
31A	Gene Pelowski	Re-election	Gene Pelowski	Rhett Zenke			DFL Hold
31B	Greg Davids	Re-election	Steve Kemp	Greg Davids			GOP Hold
32A	Joyce Peppin	Re-election	David Hoden	Joyce Peppin			GOP Hold
32B	Kurt Zellers	Re-election	Katie Rodriquez	Kurt Zellers			GOP Hold
33A	Steve Smith	Re-election	Denise Bader	Steve Smith			GOP Hold
33B	Connie Doepke	Re-election	Kim Kang	Connie Doepke			GOP Hold
34A	Paul Kohls	Open	Leanne Kunze	Ernie Leidiger			GOP Hold
34B	Joe Hoppe	Re-election		Joe Hoppe			GOP Hold
35A	Mike Beard	Re-election	Matt Christensen	Mike Beard			GOP Hold
35B	Mark Buesgens	Re-election	Jannaya LaFrance	Mark Buesgens			GOP Hold
36A	Mary Liz Holberg	Re-election	Colin Lee	Mary Liz Holberg			GOP Hold
36B	Pat Garofalo	Re-election	Sigrid Iversen	Pat Garofalo			GOP Hold
37A	Tara Mack	Re-election	Derrick Lindstrom	Tara Mack			GOP Hold
37B	Phil Sterner	Re-election	Phil Sterner	Kurt Bills			GOP Gain
38A	Sandra Masin	Re-election	Sandra Masin	Diane Anderson			GOP Gain
38B	Mike Obermueller	Re-election	Mike Obermueller	Doug Wardlow			GOP Gain
39A	Rick Hansen	Re-election	Rick Hansen	Don Lee			DFL Hold
39B	Joe Atkins	Re-election	Joe Atkins	Terry Pearson			DFL Hold
40A	Will Morgan	Re-election	Will Morgan	Pam Myhra	Bruce Johnson		GOP Gain
40B	Ann Lenczewski	Re-election	Ann Lenczewski	Sanu Patel-Zellinger			DFL Hold
41A	Keith Downey	Re-election	Kevin Staunton	Keith Downey			GOP Hold
41B	Paul Rosenthal	Re-election	Paul Rosenthal	Pat Mazorol	Naomi Babcock		GOP Gain
42A	Maria Ruud	Re-election	Maria Ruud	Kirk Stensrud			GOP Gain
42B	Jenifer Loon	Re-election	Ray L. Daniels	Jenifer Loon			GOP Hold
43A	Sarah Anderson	Re-election	Audrey Britton	Sarah Anderson			GOP Hold
43B	John Benson	Re-election	John Benson	Brian Grogan			DFL Hold
44A	Steve Simon	Re-election	Steve Simon	Stephen Manderfeld			DFL Hold
44B	Ryan Winkler	Re-election	Ryan Winkler	Rick Rice			DFL Hold
45A	Sandra Peterson	Re-election	Sandra Peterson	Mark Martin			DFL Hold
45B	Lyndon Carlson	Re-election	Lyndon Carlson	Reid Johnson			DFL Hold
46A	Mike Nelson	Re-election	Mike Nelson	Chuck Sutphen			DFL Hold
46B	Debra Hilstrom	Re-election	Debra Hilstrom	Tim Olson			DFL Hold
47A	Denise Dittrich	Re-election	Denise Dittrich	Cameron Roberson			DFL Hold
47B	Melissa Hortman	Re-election	Melissa Hortman	Linda Etim	Don Hallblade		DFL Hold
48A	Tom Hackbarth	Re-election	Laurie Olmon	Tom Hackbarth			GOP Hold
48B	Jim Abeler	Re-election	Daniel Kane	Jim Abeler			GOP Hold
49A	Peggy Scott	Re-election	Dustin Norman	Peggy Scott			GOP Hold
49B	Jerry Newton	Re-election	Jerry Newton	Branden Petersen	Harley Swarm		GOP Gain
50A	Carolyn Laine	Re-election	Carolyn Laine	Tim Utz			DFL Hold
50B	Kate Knuth	Re-election	Kate Knuth	Russel Bertsch			DFL Hold
51A	Tim Sanders	Re-election	Zak Chlebeck	Tim Sanders			GOP Hold
51B	Tom Tillberry	Re-election	Tom Tillberry	Dale Helm			DFL Hold
52A	Bob Dettmer	Re-election	Adam Best	Bob Dettmer			GOP Hold
52B	Matt Dean	Re-election	Jeff Peterson	Matt Dean			GOP Hold
53A	Paul Gardner	Re-election	Paul Gardner	Linda Runbeck			GOP Gain
53B	Carol McFarlane	Re-election	Chris Knopf	Carol McFarlane			GOP Hold
54A	Mindy Greiling	Re-election	Mindy Greiling	Mark Fotsch			DFL Hold
54B	Bev Scalze	Re-election	Bev Scalze	Ken Rubenzer			DFL Hold
55A	Leon Lillie	Re-election	Leon Lillie	Nathan Hansen	Joseph Polencheck		DFL Hold
55B	Nora Slawik	Re-election	Nora Slawik	Damon Dalton			DFL Hold
56A	Julie Bunn	Re-election	Julie Bunn	Kathy Lohmer		James Martin	GOP Gain
56B	Marsha Swails	Re-election	Marsha Swails	Andrea Kieffer			GOP Gain
57A	Karla Bigham	Open	Jen Peterson	John Kriesel			GOP Gain
57B	Denny McNamara	Re-election	Dave Page	Denny McNamara			GOP Hold
58A	Joe Mullery	Re-election	Joe Mullery	Chris Hiatt			DFL Hold
58B	Bobby Joe Champion	Re-election	Bobby Joe Champion	Gary Mazotta			DFL Hold
59A	Diane Loeffler	Re-election	Diane Loeffler	Mark Lazarchic			DFL Hold
59B	Phyllis Kahn	Re-election	Phyllis Kahn	Ole Hovde	Ron Lischeid		DFL Hold
60A	Margaret Anderson Kelliher	Open	Marion Greene	Brian Gruber			DFL Hold
60B	Frank Hornstein	Re-election	Frank Hornstein	Scott Brooks			DFL Hold
61A	Karen Clark	Re-election	Karen Clark	Nicholas Skirvanek	Sadik Warfa		DFL Hold
61B	Jeff Hayden	Re-election	Jeff Hayden	Michael J. Sullivan			DFL Hold
62A	Jim Davnie	Re-election	Jim Davnie	Wes Wittby			DFL Hold
62B	Jean Wagenius	Re-election	Jean Wagenius	Deanna Boss			DFL Hold
63A	Paul Thissen	Re-election	Paul Thissen	Nate Atkins			DFL Hold
63B	Linda Slocum	Re-election	Linda Slocum	Joel Jennissen			DFL Hold
64A	Erin Murphy	Re-election	Erin Murphy	Zach Freitag			DFL Hold
64B	Michael Paymar	Re-election	Michael Paymar	Andrew Smith			DFL Hold
65A	Cy Thao	Open	Rena Moran	Paul Holmgren			DFL Hold
65B	Carlos Mariani	Re-election	Carlos Mariani	Jamie Delton			DFL Hold
66A	John Lesch	Re-election	John Lesch	Chris Conner			DFL Hold
66B	Alice Hausman	Re-election	Alice Hausman	Bob Koss			DFL Hold
67A	Tim Mahoney	Re-election	Tim Mahoney	Catherine O. Hennelly			DFL Hold
67B	Sheldon Johnson	Re-election	Sheldon Johnson	Cheryl Golden-Black			DFL Hold

== See also ==
- 2010 Minnesota Senate election
- 2010 Minnesota gubernatorial election
- 2010 Minnesota elections
