= 85th Minnesota Legislature =

2007 to 2008 legislative session

Eighty-fifth Minnesota Legislature
←	84th Minnesota Legislature	86th Minnesota Legislature	→
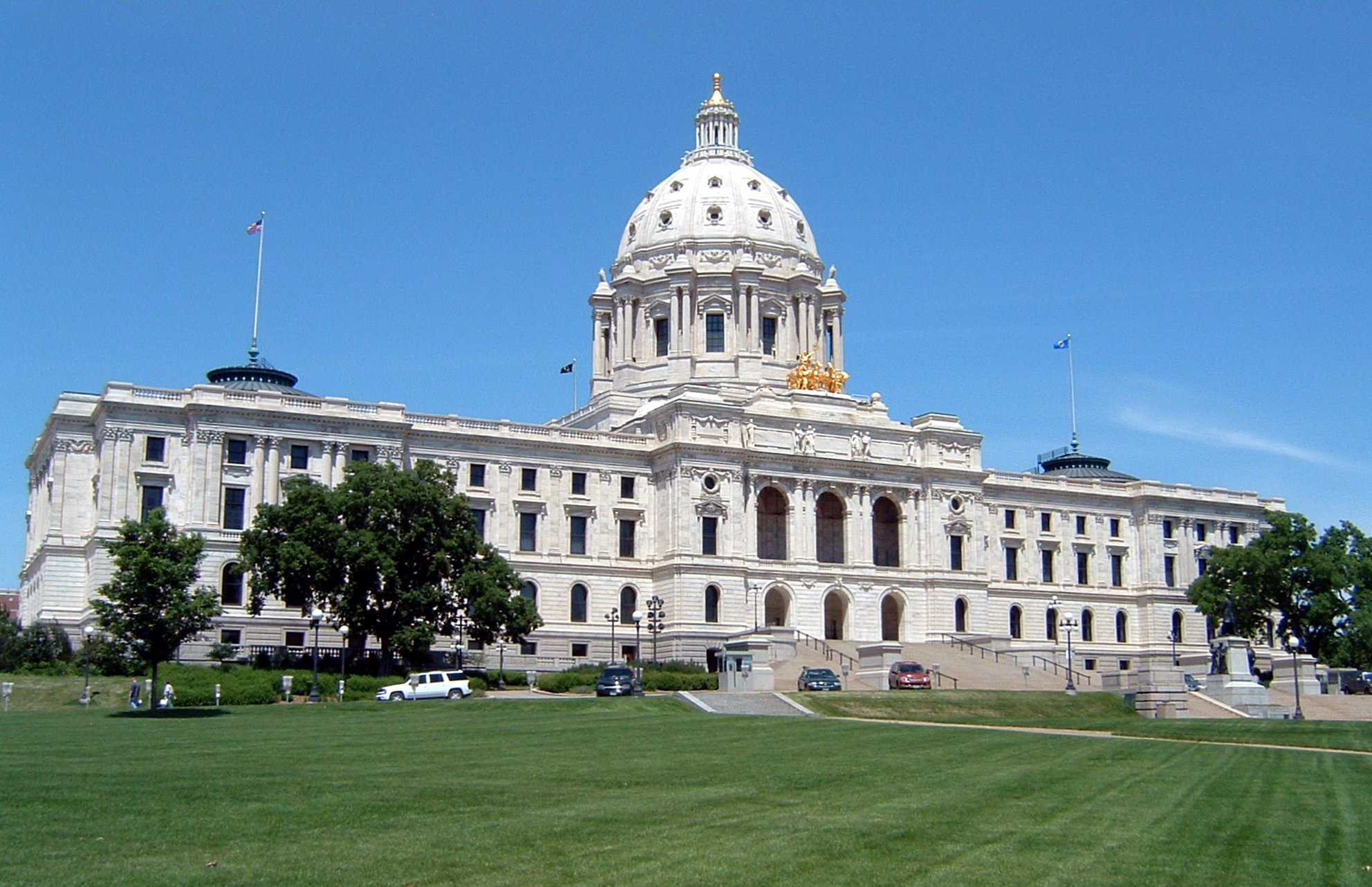

Overview
- Legislative body: Minnesota Legislature
- Jurisdiction: Minnesota, United States
- Meeting place: Minnesota State Capitol
- Term: January 3, 2007 – January 6, 2009
- Election: 2006 General Election

Minnesota State Senate
- Members: 67 Senators
- President: James Metzen
- Majority Leader: Lawrence Pogemiller
- Minority Leader: David Senjem
- Party control: Democratic-Farmer-Labor Party

Minnesota House of Representatives
- Members: 134 Representatives
- Speaker: Margaret Anderson Kelliher
- Majority Leader: Anthony Sertich
- Minority Leader: Marty Seifert
- Party control: Democratic-Farmer-Labor Party

The eighty-fifth Minnesota Legislature first convened on January 3, 2007. The 67 members of the Minnesota Senate and the 134 members of the Minnesota House of Representatives were all elected during the General Election on November 7, 2006.

== Sessions ==
The legislature met in regular session beginning January 3, 2007 and ending May 21, 2007. A bill passed on February 22 required the state to generate a significant amount of its energy needs from renewable sources.

A special session was convened September 11, 2007 to pass legislature relating to floods in southeast Minnesota and the I-35W Mississippi River bridge.

The legislature re-convened for regular session on February 12, 2008 and adjourned in May.

== Party summary ==
Resignations and new members are discussed in the "Membership changes" section, below.

=== Senate ===
	Party (Shading indicates majority caucus)		Total	Vacant
	DFL	R	Total	Vacant
End of previous Legislature	38	29	67	0
Begin	44	23	67	0
January 1, 2008	44	22	66	1
January 3, 2008	45	22	67	0
July 28, 2008	45	21	66	1
November 5, 2008	44	21	65	2
Latest voting share	68%	32%		
Beginning of the next Legislature	46	21	67	0

=== House of Representatives ===
	Party (Shading indicates majority caucus)			Total	Vacant
	DFL	IR	R	Total	Vacant
End of previous Legislature	66	0	67	133	1
Begin	85	0	49	134	0
July 17, 2007	85	0	48	133	1
August 7, 2007	85	0	49	134	0
December 1, 2007	85	1	48	134	0
Latest voting share	63%	1%	36%		
Beginning of the next Legislature	87	0	47	134	0

== Leadership ==
=== Senate ===
President of the Senate
James Metzen (DFL-South St. Paul)

Senate Majority Leader
Lawrence Pogemiller (DFL-Minneapolis)

Senate Minority Leader
David Senjem (R-Rochester)

=== House of Representatives ===
Speaker of the House
Margaret Anderson Kelliher (DFL-Minneapolis)

House Majority Leader
Anthony Sertich (DFL-Chisholm)

House Minority Leader
Marty Seifert (R-Marshall)

== Members ==
=== Senate ===
Name	District	City	Party
Anderson, Ellen	66	St. Paul	DFL
Bakk, Thomas M.	06	Cook	DFL
Berglin, Linda	61	Minneapolis	DFL
Betzold, Don	51	Fridley	DFL
Bonoff, Terri	43	Minnetonka	DFL
Carlson, Jim	38	Eagan	DFL
Chaudhary, Satveer S.	50	Fridley	DFL
Clark, Tarryl	15	St. Cloud	DFL
Cohen, Dick	64	St. Paul	DFL
Dahle, Kevin	25	Northfield	DFL
Day, Dick	26	Owatonna	Rep
Dibble, D. Scott	60	Minneapolis	DFL
Dille, Steve	18	Dassel	Rep
Doll, John P.	40	Burnsville	DFL
Erickson Ropes, Sharon	31	Winona	DFL
Fischbach, Michelle	14	Paynesville	Rep
Foley, Leo	47	Coon Rapids	DFL
Frederickson, Dennis	21	New Ulm	Rep
Gerlach, Chris	37	Apple Valley	Rep
Gimse, Joe	13	Willmar	Rep
Hann, David	42	Eden Prairie	Rep
Higgins, Linda	58	Minneapolis	DFL
Ingebrigtsen, Bill	11	Alexandria	Rep
Johnson, Debbie	49	Ham Lake	Rep
Jungbauer, Mike	48	East Bethel	Rep
Koch, Amy T.	19	Buffalo	Rep
Koering, Paul	12	Fort Ripley	Rep
Kubly, Gary W.	20	Granite Falls	DFL
Langseth, Keith	09	Glyndon	DFL
Larson, Dan	63	Bloomington	DFL
Latz, Ron	44	St. Louis Park	DFL
Limmer, Warren	32	Maple Grove	Rep
Lourey, Tony	08	Kerrick	DFL
Lynch, Ann	30	Rochester	DFL
Marty, John	54	Roseville	DFL
Metzen, James P.	39	South St. Paul	DFL
Michel, Geoff	41	Edina	Rep
Moua, Mee	67	St. Paul	DFL
Murphy, Steve	28	Red Wing	DFL
Neuville, Tom	25	Northfield	Rep
Olseen, Rick	17	Harris	DFL
Olson, Gen	33	Minnetrista	Rep
Olson, Mary	04	Bemidji	DFL
Ortman, Julianne E.	34	Chanhassen	Rep
Pappas, Sandy	65	St. Paul	DFL
Pariseau, Patricia	36	Farmington	Rep
Pogemiller, Lawrence J.	59	Minneapolis	DFL
Solon, Yvonne Prettner	07	Duluth	DFL
Rest, Ann H.	45	New Hope	DFL
Robling, Claire	35	Jordan	Rep
Rosen, Julie A.	24	Fairmont	Rep
Rummel, Sandy	53	White Bear Lake	DFL
Saltzman, Kathy	56	Woodbury	DFL
Saxhaug, Tom	03	Grand Rapids	DFL
Scheid, Linda	46	Brooklyn Park	DFL
Senjem, David H.	29	Rochester	Rep
Sheran, Kathy	23	Mankato	DFL
Sieben, Katie	57	Newport	DFL
Skoe, Rod	02	Clearbrook	DFL
Skogen, Dan	10	Hewitt	DFL
Sparks, Dan	27	Austin	DFL
Stumpf, LeRoy	01	Plummer	DFL
Tomassoni, David J.	05	Chisholm	DFL
Torres Ray, Patricia	62	Minneapolis	DFL
Vandeveer, Ray	52	Forest Lake	Rep
Vickerman, Jim	22	Tracy	DFL
Wergin, Betsy	16	Princeton	Rep
Wiger, Chuck	55	North St. Paul	DFL

=== House of Representatives ===
Name	District	City	Party
Abeler, Jim	48B	Anoka	Rep
Anderson, Bruce	19A	Buffalo Township	Rep
Anderson, Sarah	43A	Plymouth	Rep
Anzelc, Tom	03A	Balsam Township	DFL
Atkins, Joe	39B	Inver Grove Heights	DFL
Beard, Michael	35A	Shakopee	Rep
Benson, John	43B	Minnetonka	DFL
Berns, John	33B	Wayzata	Rep
Bigham, Karla	57A	Cottage Grove	DFL
Bly, David	25B	Northfield	DFL
Brod, Laura	25A	New Prague	Rep
Brown, Robin	27A	Austin	DFL
Brynaert, Kathy	23B	Mankato	DFL
Buesgens, Mark	35B	Jordan	Rep
Bunn, Julie	56A	Lake Elmo	DFL
Carlson, Lyndon	45B	Crystal	DFL
Clark, Karen	61A	Minneapolis	DFL
Cornish, Tony	24B	Good Thunder	Rep
Davnie, Jim	62A	Minneapolis	DFL
Dean, Matt	52B	Dellwood	Rep
DeLaForest, Chris	49A	Andover	Rep
Demmer, Randy	29A	Hayfield	Rep
Dettmer, Bob	52A	Forest Lake	Rep
Dill, David	06A	Crane Lake	DFL
Dittrich, Denise	47A	Champlin	DFL
Dominguez, Augustine "Willie"	58B	Minneapolis	DFL
Doty, Al	12B	Royalton	DFL
Drazkowski, Steve	28B	Wabasha	Rep
Eastlund, Rob	17A	Isanti	Rep
Eken, Kent	02A	Twin Valley	DFL
Emmer, Tom	19B	Delano	Rep
Erhardt, Ron	41A	Edina	Rep
Erickson, Sondra	16A	Princeton	Rep
Faust, Tim	08B	Mora	DFL
Finstad, Brad	21B	Comfrey	Rep
Fritz, Patti	26B	Faribault	DFL
Gardner, Paul	53A	Shoreview	DFL
Garofalo, Pat	36B	Farmington	Rep
Gottwalt, Steve	15A	St. Cloud	Rep
Greiling, Mindy	54A	Roseville	DFL
Gunther, Bob	24A	Fairmont	Rep
Hackbarth, Tom	48A	Cedar	Rep
Hamilton, Rod	22B	Mountain Lake	Rep
Hansen, Rick	39A	South St. Paul	DFL
Hausman, Alice	66B	St. Paul	DFL
Haws, Larry	15B	St. Cloud	DFL
Heidgerken, Bud	13A	Freeport	Rep
Hilstrom, Debra	46B	Brooklyn Center	DFL
Hilty, Bill	08A	Finlayson	DFL
Holberg, Mary Liz	36A	Lakeville	Rep
Hoppe, Joe	34B	Chaska	Rep
Hornstein, Frank	60B	Minneapolis	DFL
Hortman, Melissa	47B	Brooklyn Park	DFL
Hosch, Larry	14B	St. Joseph	DFL
Howes, Larry	04B	Walker	Rep
Huntley, Thomas	07A	Duluth	DFL
Jaros, Mike	07B	Duluth	DFL
Johnson, Sheldon	67B	St. Paul	DFL
Juhnke, Al	13B	Willmar	DFL
Kahn, Phyllis	59B	Minneapolis	DFL
Kalin, Jeremy	17B	Lindstrom	DFL
Kelliher, Margaret Anderson	60A	Minneapolis	DFL
Knuth, Kate	50B	New Brighton	DFL
Koenen, Lyle	20B	Clara City	DFL
Kohls, Paul	34A	Victoria	Rep
Kranz, Scott	51A	Blaine	DFL
Laine, Carolyn	50A	Columbia Heights	DFL
Lanning, Morrie	09A	Moorhead	Rep
Lenczewski, Ann	40B	Bloomington	DFL
Lesch, John	66A	St. Paul	DFL
Liebling, Tina	30A	Rochester	DFL
Lieder, Bernard	01B	Crookston	DFL
Lillie, Leon	55A	North St. Paul	DFL
Loeffler, Diane	59A	Minneapolis	DFL
Madore, Shelley	37A	Apple Valley	DFL
Magnus, Doug	22A	Slayton	Rep
Mahoney, Tim	67A	St. Paul	DFL
Mariani, Carlos	65B	St. Paul	DFL
Marquart, Paul	09B	Dilworth	DFL
Masin, Sandra	38A	Eagan	DFL
McFarlane, Carol	53B	White Bear Lake	Rep
McNamara, Denny	57B	Hastings	Rep
Moe, Frank	04A	Bemidji	DFL
Morgan, Will	40A	Burnsville	DFL
Morrow, Terry	23A	St. Peter	DFL
Mullery, Joe	58A	Minneapolis	DFL
Murphy, Erin	64A	St. Paul	DFL
Murphy, Mary	06B	Hermantown	DFL
Nelson, Michael	46A	Brooklyn Park	DFL
Nornes, Bud	10A	Fergus Falls	Rep
Norton, Kim	29B	Rochester	DFL
Olin, Dave	01A	Thief River Falls	DFL
Olson, Mark	16B	Big Lake	IR
Otremba, Mary Ellen	11B	Long Prairie	DFL
Ozment, Dennis	37B	Rosemount	Rep
Paulsen, Erik	42B	Eden Prairie	Rep
Paymar, Michael	64B	St. Paul	DFL
Pelowski, Gene	31A	Winona	DFL
Peppin, Joyce	32A	Rogers	Rep
Peterson, Aaron	20A	Appleton	DFL
Peterson, Neil W.	41B	Bloomington	Rep
Peterson, Sandra	45A	New Hope	DFL
Poppe, Jeanne	27B	Austin	DFL
Rukavina, Tom	05A	Virginia	DFL
Ruth, Connie	26A	Owatonna	Rep
Ruud, Maria	42A	Minnetonka	DFL
Sailer, Brita	02B	Park Rapids	DFL
Scalze, Bev	54B	Little Canada	DFL
Seifert, Marty	21A	Marshall	Rep
Sertich, Tony	05B	Chisholm	DFL
Severson, Dan	14A	Sauk Rapids	Rep
Shimanski, Ron	18A	Silver Lake	Rep
Simon, Steve	44A	St. Louis Park	DFL
Simpson, Dean	10B	Perham	Rep
Slawik, Nora	55B	Maplewood	Rep
Slocum, Linda	63B	Richfield	DFL
Smith, Steve	33A	Mound	Rep
Solberg, Loren	03B	Grand Rapids	DFL
Sviggum, Steve	28B	Kenyon	Rep
Swails, Marsha	56B	Woodbury	DFL
Thao, Cy	65A	St. Paul	DFL
Thissen, Paul	63A	Minneapolis	DFL
Tillberry, Tom	51B	Fridley	DFL
Tingelstad, Kathy	49B	Andover	Rep
Tschumper, Ken	31B	La Crescent	DFL
Urdahl, Dean	18B	Grove City	Rep
Wagenius, Jean	62B	Minneapolis	DFL
Walker, Neva	61B	Minneapolis	DFL
Ward, John	12A	Brainerd	DFL
Wardlow, Lynn	38B	Eagan	Rep
Welti, Andy	30B	Plainview	DFL
Westrom, Torrey	11A	Elbow Lake	Rep
Winkler, Ryan	44B	Golden Valley	DFL
Wollschlager, Sandy	28A	Cannon Falls	DFL
Zellers, Kurt	32B	Maple Grove	Rep

== Membership changes ==
=== Senate ===
District	Vacated by	Reason for change	Successor	Date successor elected
25	Tom Neuville (R)	Resigned effective January 1, 2008 to accept appointment as Third Judicial District trial court judge.	Kevin Dahle (DFL)	January 3, 2008
16	Betsy Wergin (R)	Resigned July 28, 2008 to accept appointment to the Minnesota Public Utilities Commission. Successor elected November 4, 2008, but did not assume office until the convention of the 86th Minnesota Legislature.	Lisa Fobbe (DFL)	November 4, 2008
63	Dan Larson (DFL)	Resigned effective November 5, 2008. Successor elected November 4, 2008, but did not assume office until the convention of the 86th Minnesota Legislature.	Ken Kelash (DFL)	November 4, 2008

=== House of Representatives ===
District	Vacated by	Reason for change	Successor	Date successor elected
28B	Steve Sviggum (R)	Resigned July 17, 2007 to become Minnesota Commissioner of Labor and Industry.	Steve Drazkowski (R)	August 7, 2007

== Notes ==
Preceded by Eighty-fourth Minnesota Legislature	Eighty-fifth Minnesota Legislature; 2007—2009	Succeeded by Eighty-sixth Minnesota Legislature
