= Tara Mack =

American politician (born 1983)

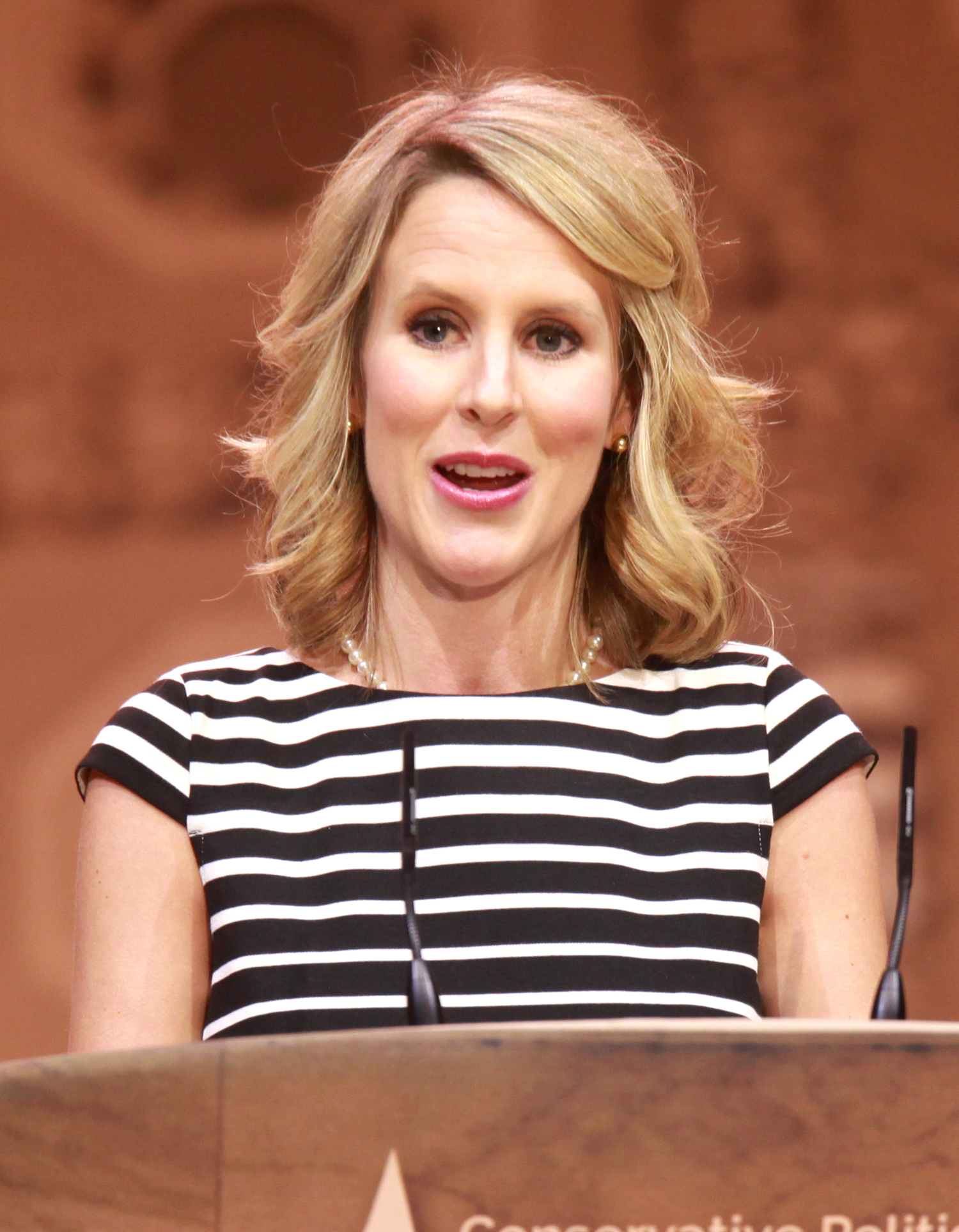

Member of the Minnesota House of Representatives
- In office January 6, 2009 – January 2, 2017
- Preceded by: Shelley Madore
- Succeeded by: Erin Maye Quade
- Constituency: District 57A (2013–2017); District 37A (2009–2013)

Personal details
- Born: June 26, 1983 (age 43) Burnsville, Minnesota
- Party: Republican
- Spouse: Justin
- Children: 2
- Education: University of Minnesota

Tara Kay Mack (née Tara Klongerbo; born June 26, 1983) is a Minnesota politician and former member of the Minnesota House of Representatives. A member of the Republican Party of Minnesota, she represented District 57A, which included portions of the cities of Apple Valley and Lakeville in Dakota County, which is in the southeastern part of the Twin Cities metropolitan area.

== Early life, education, and career ==
Mack graduated from Apple Valley High School in Apple Valley in 2002, then went on to the University of Minnesota in Minneapolis, earning a bachelor's degree in Political Science/Global Studies. During college, she served as an intern for then-Speaker of the Minnesota House of Representatives Steve Sviggum, and was also a page for the House Ways and Means Committee.

== Minnesota House of Representatives ==
Mack was first elected in 2008, defeating first-term Democrat Shelly Madore. She was re-elected in 2010, 2012, and 2014. During her first two terms, the Apple Valley-based seat was numbered Minnesota House District 37A. After redistricting in 2012, the seat was known as Minnesota House District 57A.

Minnesota House of Representatives, District 37A General Election, 2008
Party	Candidate	Vote %	Votes
Republican	Tara Mack	52.2%	11,666
Democrat	Shelly Madore	47.6%	10,633
Write-In			36
Total Votes			22,335

Minnesota House of Representatives, District 37A General Election, 2010
Party	Candidate	Vote %	Votes
Republican	Tara Mack (inc.)	60.5%	9,675
Democrat	Derrick Lindstrom	39.4%	6,301
Write-In		.1%	14
Total Votes			15,990

Minnesota House of Representatives, District 57A General Election, 2012
Party	Candidate	Vote %	Votes
Republican	Tara Mack (inc.)	53.5%	11,420
Democrat	Roberta Gibbons	46.5%	9,941
Write-In		.17%	36
Total Votes			21,397

Minnesota House of Representatives, District 57A General Election, 2014
Party	Candidate	Vote %	Votes
Republican	Tara Mack (inc.)	58.4%	8,347
Democrat	Bruce Folken	41.5%	5,931
Write-In		.04	6
Total Votes			14,290

From 2015 to 2016, Mack served as chair of the House Health & Human Services Reform Committee. As chair, she opposed the MNsure health insurance website. Mack was a supporter of maintaining the Minnesota Sex Offender Program and opposed unconditional release of violent predatory offenders.

She worked for the Minnesota House as a legislative assistant to Rep. Matt Dean and Rep. Joe Hoppe prior to her election.

On August 25, 2015, a park ranger cited Mack for "public nuisance" for allegedly "making out" with fellow Minnesota State Representative Tim Kelly in Lebanon Hills Regional Park. Mack and Kelly initially claimed the report was "completely false," and Mack continues to dispute certain "details of the park ranger's report." On September 14, 2015, Mack apologized to law enforcement for her handling of the situation and resigned from the House Ethics Committee.

In February 2016, Mack announced her retirement from the Minnesota House of Representatives.

== Personal life ==
Mack is a member of the Burnsville YMCA Board, a former member of the Apple Valley Rotary, and both the Apple Valley and Burnsville chambers of commerce. She was named a 2014 Aspen Institute Rodel Fellow. Her husband, Justin Mack, is a pastor and they have two children.
