= 2008 Minnesota elections =

2008 Minnesota general election
- November 4, 2008
- Turnout: 78.08%

Elections were held in Minnesota on November 4, 2008. Primary elections took place on September 9, 2008.

== Federal ==
=== President and Vice President of the United States ===
The 2008 presidential election pitted Illinois Democratic Senator Barack Obama against Arizona Republican Senator John McCain. Minnesota was considered a swing state in the election.

Both major-party candidates made high-profile visits to the state. Obama gave a speech declaring victory in the Democratic primaries in June of that year at the Xcel Energy Center. The venue was used three months later to host the 2008 Republican National Convention in September where McCain accepted the nomination of the Republican Party.

Obama went on to win the state in the November election, earning all ten of its electoral votes.

=== United States Senate ===
Incumbent Republican Senator Norm Coleman was challenged by radio host and comedian DFLer Al Franken and former Independence Senator Dean Barkley. The race was close, requiring a recount followed by several legal challenges that would prevent a winner from being seated until July 2009. While Coleman held a slight lead at the end of election night, the subsequent recount ultimately gave Al Franken a 225-vote lead. A legal challenge by Coleman was unsuccessful and Franken was eventually certified as the winner of the election following a unanimous ruling of the Minnesota Supreme Court, having a final margin of 312 votes.

=== United States House of Representatives ===
All of Minnesota's eight seats in the United States House of Representatives were up for election in 2008. Seven incumbents successfully sought re-election. One incumbent, Republican Representative Jim Ramstad retired and was replaced by Republican state Representative Erik Paulsen, who defeated DFL challenger Ashwin Madia.

== State ==
Minnesota's constitutional officers—governor, lieutenant governor, secretary of state, attorney general, and auditor—were not up for election in 2008.

=== Minnesota Senate ===
The Minnesota Senate was not up for election in 2008.

=== Minnesota House of Representatives ===
All 134 seats in the Minnesota House of Representatives were up for election in 2008. The DFL expanded its lead in the chamber, gaining two seats to 87 members. Republicans lost one seat, dropping to 47 members. The body's lone independent, Mark Olson—who had been ejected from the Republican caucus after being convicted of spousal abuse—chose not to seek re-election.
