= Kathy Lohmer =

American politician

Member of the Minnesota House of Representatives from the 39B district 56A (2011–2013)
- In office January 4, 2011 – January 7, 2019
- Preceded by: Julie Bunn
- Succeeded by: Shelly Christensen

Personal details
- Born: January 15, 1954 (age 72)
- Party: Republican Party of Minnesota
- Spouse: Greg
- Children: 4
- Occupation: Homeschool Cooperative Founder, Small Business Owner

Kathy M. Lohmer (born January 15, 1954) is an American politician and former member of the Minnesota House of Representatives. A member of the Republican Party of Minnesota, she represented District 39B, which includes portions of Washington County in the eastern Twin Cities metropolitan area, from 2010-2018. She is the founder of a homeschool cooperative and she and her husband are also small business owners. She was previously a medical office administrator.

== Minnesota House of Representatives ==
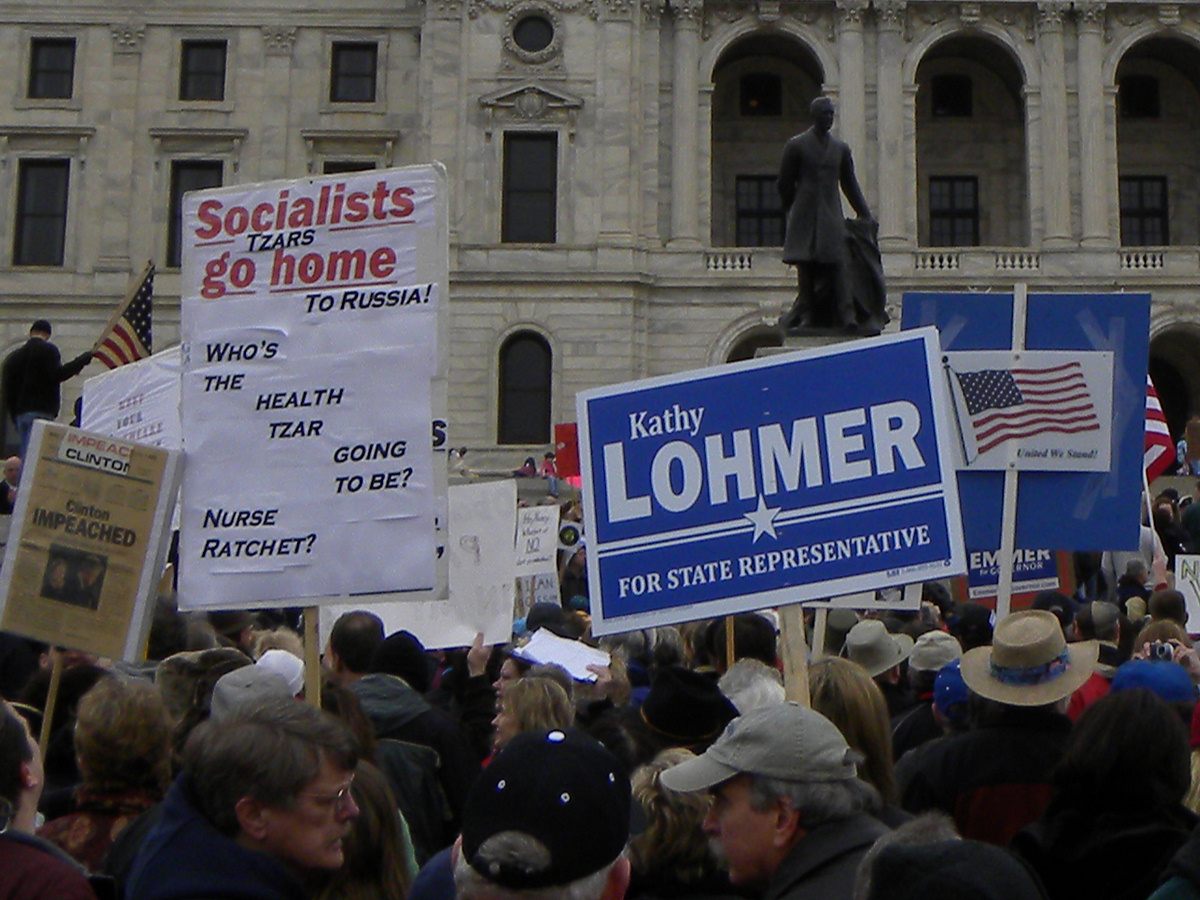
Lohmer supporters at a Tea Party movement rally

Lohmer was first elected to the House in 2010 and was re-elected in 2012, 2014, and 2016. She ran for re-election in 2018 but was unseated by DFL challenger Shelly Christensen.

== Personal life ==
Lohmer is an active volunteer in her community and church. She started support groups for the Spina Bifida Association, and has worked with the Boy Scouts and Courage Youth Sports, an organization that helps disabled kids play a variety of sports, from wheelchair basketball to track and field and floor hockey. She is a "Blue Star Mom," and a member of the Blue Star Mothers Club.
