= Andrea Kieffer =

American politician (born 1964)

Member of the Minnesota House of Representatives from the 53B district 56B (2011–2013)
- In office January 4, 2011 – January 5, 2015
- Preceded by: Marsha Swails
- Succeeded by: Kelly Fenton

Personal details
- Born: January 1964 (age 62) Illinois
- Party: Republican Party of Minnesota
- Spouse: John
- Children: 2
- Education: University of Minnesota
- Occupation: nonprofit volunteer, legislator

Andrea L. Kieffer (born January 1964) is a Minnesota politician and former member of the Minnesota House of Representatives. A member of the Republican Party of Minnesota, she represented District 53B, which includes the cities of Woodbury and Landfall in Washington County in the eastern Twin Cities metropolitan area. She is also a nonprofit volunteer.

== Education ==
Kieffer graduated from the University of Minnesota's Carlson School of Management in Minneapolis, earning her B.S. in Business Management.

== Minnesota House of Representatives ==
Kieffer was first elected to the House in 2010 and was re-elected in 2012. She announced on November 6, 2013 that she would not seek re-election in 2014.

She was one of only 4 Republican representatives to vote in favor of the same-sex marriage bill passed by the House on May 9, 2013.

== Personal life ==
Active in her community, she is a member of Minnesota Excellence in Public Service, the Woodbury Chamber of Commerce, the Woodbury Children’s Hospital Association and the Woodbury Community Foundation.

Kieffer previously lived overseas in Budapest, Hungary, and in Singapore. While in Budapest, she served as a school board member of the American International School of Budapest, as chair of the Parent-School Association, as a board member of the North American Women’s Association, and as a board member of the Youth Compass. While in Singapore, she was a member-at-large of the Parent-Teacher Association and a member-at-large of the International Women’s Association.
