= Ken Kelash =

American politician (born 1952)

Member of the Minnesota Senate from the 63rd district
- In office January 6, 2009 – January 7, 2013
- Preceded by: Dan Larson
- Succeeded by: district redrawn

Personal details
- Born: May 8, 1952 (age 74)
- Party: Minnesota Democratic-Farmer-Labor Party
- Spouse: Elaine
- Children: 2; Katrina and Martha
- Education: Hennepin Technical Center; Metropolitan State University; John F. Kennedy School of Government
- Occupation: carpenter, union officer, business agent, legislator

Kenneth Kelash (born May 8, 1952) is a Minnesota politician and former member of the Minnesota Senate representing District 63, which included portions of the city of Minneapolis in Hennepin County. A Democrat, he was first elected to the Senate in a special election held on November 4, 2008. The seat became vacant when Senator Dan Larson resigned in order to accept a position with his former employer, a law and lobbying firm in Minneapolis. He was re-elected in 2010.

Kelash was a member of the Senate's Agriculture and Rural Economies, Environment and Natural Resources, and Jobs and Economic Growth committees. His special legislative concerns included jobs, education, and transportation.

Kelash is a retired carpenter, union officer and regional business agent. He has been a member of the Carpenter's Local Union #1644 since 1976, and has been active in the Minnesota Building Trades Union, the Minneapolis Central Labor Union Council, and the Minnesota AFL-CIO. He has served on the Minneapolis Workforce Investment Board (WIB) and the Hennepin County Workforce Investment Board, which direct federal and state money into jobs and training programs. He has also been a member of the Policy Board of the Minneapolis Neighborhood Revitalization Program (NRP) for more than 10 years.

Kelash attended the carpentry program at Hennepin Technical Center, graduating in 1974. He received his B.A. from Metropolitan State University in 1984. In 2003, he earned his M.P.A. from the John F. Kennedy School of Government at Harvard University, made possible by a Bush Leadership Fellowship, which he was awarded in 2002.
