= 2006 Minnesota elections =

2006 Minnesota general election
- November 7, 2006
- Turnout: 60.47%

The Minnesota state elections were held on November 7, 2006, seats were up for election for both the Minnesota House of Representatives and the Minnesota Senate as well as the races for governor of Minnesota, Minnesota attorney general, Minnesota secretary of state, and Minnesota state auditor.

== Overview ==
The 2006 elections saw all 134 seats in the State House, elected to two-year terms, and all 67 seats in the State Senate, elected to four-year terms, up for election. Incumbent Republican governor Tim Pawlenty ran for a second term, with opposition coming from Democratic-Farmer-Labor Attorney General Mike Hatch. Republican Secretary of State Mary Kiffmeyer saw opposition from DFLer Mark Ritchie, and Republican Auditor Patricia Anderson was challenged by DFLer Rebecca Otto.

== State elections ==
=== Legislative elections ===
==== Minnesota House of Representatives ====
Since 1998 the Republicans held a majority in the House of Representatives which, since the 2004 elections, had been reduced to a slim 68–66. In 2006 the DFL gained 19 seats to give them an 85–49 majority.
