= Kory Kath =

American politician

Member of the Minnesota House of Representatives from the 26A district
- In office 2009 – January 7, 2013
- Preceded by: Connie Ruth
- Succeeded by: district redrawn

Personal details
- Born: July 1977 (age 49) Meriden, Minnesota
- Party: Minnesota Democratic-Farmer-Labor Party
- Education: Gustavus Adolphus College; Southwest Minnesota State University
- Profession: educator, legislator

Kory L. Kath (born July 1977) is a Minnesota politician and former member of the Minnesota House of Representatives. He represented District 26A, which included all or portions of Steele and Waseca counties in the southeastern part of the state. As a Democrat, Kath was also an American Studies, Economics and Political Science teacher at Owatonna High School in Owatonna, where he is currently Principal.

Kath was first elected in 2008, succeeding four-term Rep. Connie Ruth, who did not seek re-election. He was re-elected in 2010. He was vice chair of the House K-12 Education Policy and Oversight Committee, and was a member of the Agriculture, Rural Economies and Veterans Affairs Committee and the Public Safety Policy and Oversight Committee. He also served on the Finance Subcommittee for the State Government Finance Division, and on the Public Safety Policy and Oversight Subcommittee for the Crime Victims/Criminal Records Division.

Kath graduated from Gustavus Adolphus College in St. Peter in 2000, receiving his B.A. in Political Science and Secondary Education. He went on to Southwest Minnesota State University in Marshall, earning his M.S. in Educational Leadership. Prior to becoming a teacher, he worked as a constituent advocate for the late U.S. Senator Paul Wellstone.
