= Sandra Peterson (politician) =

American politician (1936–2015)

Member of the Minnesota House of Representatives from the 45A district
- In office 2005 – January 7, 2013
- Preceded by: Lynne Osterman
- Succeeded by: district redrawn

Personal details
- Born: Sandra Espeseth Peterson; January 1936 Benson, Minnesota, U.S.
- Died: October 24, 2015 (aged 79) Minneapolis, Minnesota, U.S.
- Party: Minnesota Democratic-Farmer-Labor Party
- Children: 2
- Education: Macalester College; University of Minnesota
- Profession: Educator, legislator

Sandra Espeseth Peterson (January 1936 – October 24, 2015) was a Minnesota politician and member of the Minnesota House of Representatives representing District 45A, which included all or portions of the cities of New Hope, Plymouth and Crystal in western Hennepin County, which is part of the Twin Cities metropolitan area. A Democrat, she was also a retired teacher.

== Legislative service ==
Peterson was first elected in 2004 and reelected in 2006, 2008 and 2010. She was a member of the House's K-12 Education Policy and Oversight Committee and Rules and Legislative Administration Committee. She also served on the Finance subcommittees for the Early Childhood Finance and Policy Division and the Health Care and Human Services Finance Division.

== Education and professional background ==
Peterson attended Macalester College in Saint Paul, receiving her B.S. in Education in 1967. She also attended the University of Minnesota, earning an Emotional-Behavioral Disability (E.B.D.) graduate license and a Learning Disability (L.D.) graduate license. She was a teacher for the Robbinsdale School District from 1970 to 2004.

== Education organization and community leadership ==
Active in education organizations through the years, Peterson was president of the Robbinsdale Federation of Teachers from 1977 to 1987, president of the Minnesota Federation of Teachers from 1987 to 1998, co-president of Education Minnesota from 1998 to 2001, and vice president of Education Minnesota from 2001 to 2004. She was also a member of the board of directors of the American Education Finance Association, vice president of the American Federation of Teachers, and a member of the A.F.T.'s Program and Policy Council and Merger Advisory Team.

Peterson was also active in her community and on several government and public service committees. She was vice president of the Minnesota Chapter of the American Federation of Labor-Congress of Industrial Organizations (A.F.L.-C.I.O.). She was vice chair of the board of directors of the Minnesota Job Skills Partnership, a founding member of the Minnesota Mental Health Legislative Caucus, chair of the Career Advancement Committee of the Governor's Workforce Development Council, and a member of the Federal Reserve Bank Advisory Board. She served as a board member of the Northwest YMCA and was a member of the local League of Women Voters. She died of ovarian cancer on October 24, 2015, at the age of 79.
