= Joe Mullery =

American politician

Member of the Minnesota House of Representatives from the 59A district 58A (1997–2013)
- In office January 7, 1997 – January 2, 2017
- Preceded by: Jim Rice
- Succeeded by: Fue Lee

Personal details
- Born: June 1944 (age 82) Minneapolis, Minnesota, U.S.
- Party: Minnesota Democratic–Farmer–Labor Party
- Education: University of Minnesota; University of Minnesota Law School
- Occupation: attorney, community organizer

Joseph J. Mullery (born June 1944) is a Minnesota politician and former member of the Minnesota House of Representatives. A member of the Minnesota Democratic–Farmer–Labor Party (DFL), he represented District 59A, which includes parts of Minneapolis in Hennepin County, which is part of the Twin Cities metropolitan area.

== Early life, education, and career ==
Mullery graduated from the University of Minnesota in Minneapolis with a B.A., and from the University of Minnesota Law School, where he earned his J.D. He has been a member of the board of governors of the Minnesota State Bar Association, the governing council of the Hennepin County Bar Association, and the legal panel for the Minnesota Senior Foundation. He has also been a community leader and organizer in the Camden Neighborhood of north Minneapolis for many years.

== Minnesota House of Representatives ==
Mullery was first elected in 1996 and was reelected every two years until his defeat in 2016. He previously served as chair of the Economic Development and International Trade subcommittees for Economic Development and for the Economic Development Finance Division for Government Efficiency and Reform during the 1997–98 biennium.

In the August 9, 2016, DFL primary election, Fue Lee defeated Mullery with 55.5% of the vote.
