= Bill Hilty =

American politician (born 1928)

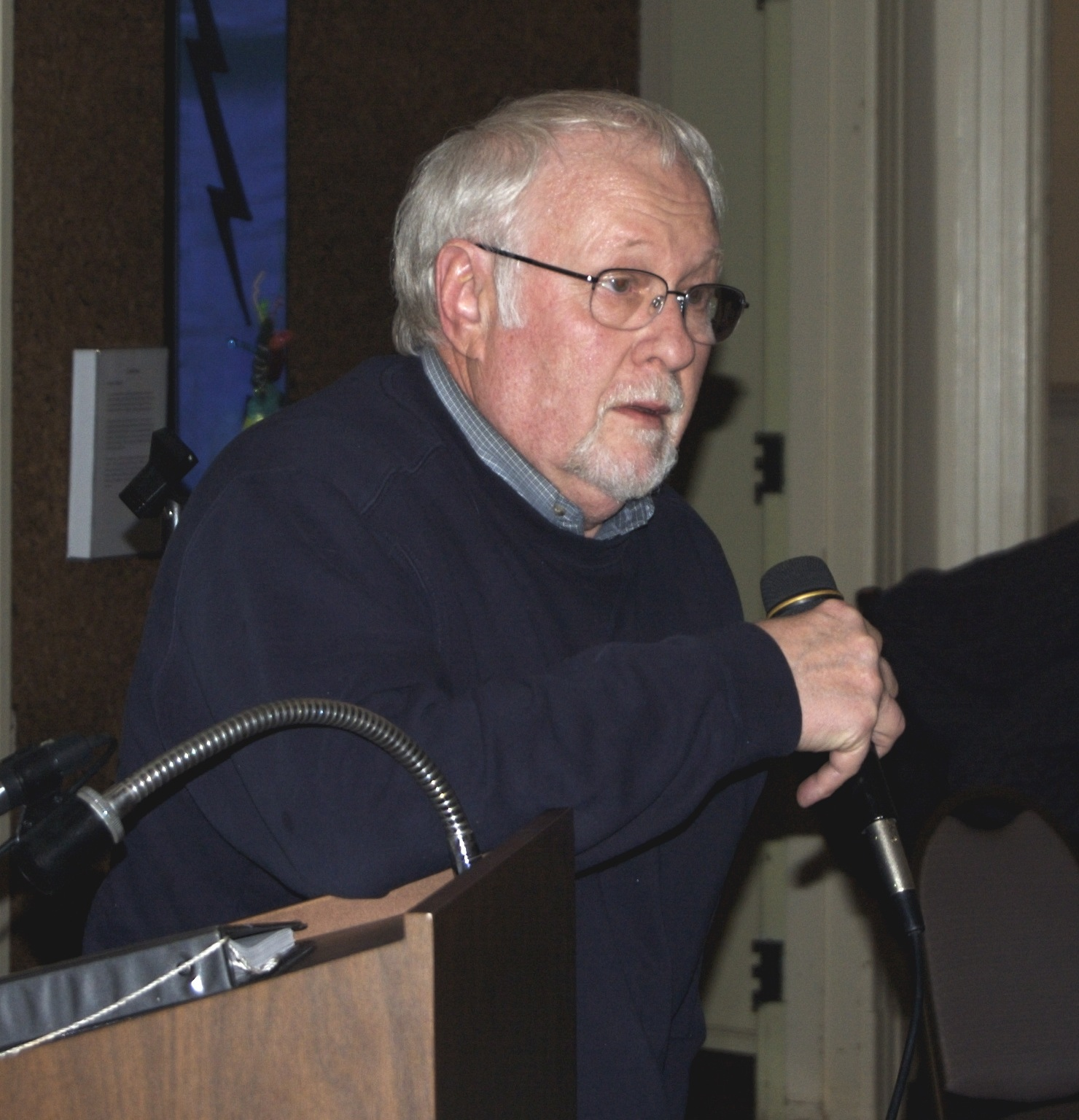
- Hilty in 2006

Member of the Minnesota House of Representatives from the 8A district
- In office January 7, 1997 – January 7, 2013
- Preceded by: Becky Lourey
- Succeeded by: district redrawn

Personal details
- Born: November 2, 1938 (age 87) Ohio
- Party: Minnesota Democratic-Farmer-Labor Party
- Spouse: Laurie
- Children: 5
- Education: Purdue University; University of Minnesota
- Profession: business owner, legislator

William J. Hilty (born November 2, 1938) is a Minnesota politician and former member of the Minnesota House of Representatives representing District 8A, which includes portions of Carlton, Pine and St. Louis counties in the northeastern part of the state. A Democrat, he is also a business owner, partner and consultant.

Hilty was first elected in 1996, and was re-elected every two years since then until retiring in 2012. He was a member of the Civil Law, the Environment, Energy and Natural Resources Policy and Finance, and the Public Safety and Crime Prevention Policy and Finance committees. He previously chaired the Finance Subcommittee for the Energy Finance and Policy Division during the 2007-2008 and 2009-2010 bienniums, and the Governmental Operations Subcommittee for Government Structures, Reform and Efficiency during the 1997-1998 biennium.

Hilty was raised on a dairy farm and graduated from Ashland High School in Ashland, Ohio. He went on to Purdue University in Lafayette, Indiana, graduating with a B.S. in psychology in 1962. He continued at Purdue University, earning his M.A. in English in 1964. He later attended the University of Minnesota in Minneapolis, finishing the coursework for a PhD in 1970 but did not complete a dissertation. He was also a teaching associate at the University of Minnesota from 1964-1970.

Hilty was a partner in Sawhill Incorporated from 1971–1978, and has been president of Minnesota Panel Systems since 1978. He is also a consultant for Nemadji Energy Company. Active in his local community, he served on the Finlayson School Board from 1986–1989, and is a member of the Greater Minnesota Coalition, of the Midwest Progressive Elected Officials Network, of the Right to be Rural Coalition, and of the National Conferences of State Legislatures. He is also a board member of the Northern Technology Initiative and of the Audubon Society of the Northwoods.
