= Larry Haws =

American politician (1940–2012)

Member of the Minnesota House of Representatives from the 15B district
- In office January 19, 2006 – January 3, 2011
- Preceded by: Joe Opatz
- Succeeded by: King Banaian

Personal details
- Born: January 12, 1940 Tracy, Minnesota
- Died: March 27, 2012 (aged 72) St. Cloud, Minnesota
- Party: Minnesota Democratic-Farmer-Labor Party
- Spouse: Faith
- Children: 4
- Education: St. Cloud State University; Minnesota State University, Mankato
- Profession: Educator, legislator

Larry W. Haws (January 12, 1940 – March 27, 2012) was a Minnesota politician and a member of the Minnesota House of Representatives who represented District 15B, which includes portions of Benton, Sherburne and Stearns counties in the north central part of the state. A Democrat, he was also a director of parks and recreation for the city of St. Cloud, and a teacher and coach. On May 17, 2010, he announced that he would not seek a fourth term.

== Biography ==
=== Education and professional background ===
Born in the southwestern Minnesota town of Tracy, Haws graduated from Loyola High School in Mankato, then went on to St. Cloud State University in St. Cloud, receiving his B.E.S. in Recreation and Biology. He also attended Minnesota State University, Mankato, earning his B.S. in Mathematics and Physical Education. He taught at Cathedral High School in St. Cloud before joining that city's park and recreation department, where he worked for 32 years.

=== Legislative service ===
Haws was first elected to the House in a December 2005 special election held after seven-term Rep. Joe Opatz resigned to become interim president of Central Lakes College in Brainerd. He was re-elected in 2006 and 2008. He was a member of the House Finance subcommittees for the Bioscience and Workforce Development Policy and Oversight Division, the Cultural and Outdoor Resources Finance Division, the Higher Education and Workforce Development Finance and Policy Division, and the Public Safety Finance Division.

=== Community service and leadership ===
Through the years, Haws was active in his local community and in local government. He was elected to the Stearns County Board of Commissioners in 1998, serving from 1999 until 2006, when he was elected to the House. He was a delegate to the Association of Minnesota Counties, a Stearns County liaison to the NorthStar Corridor light rail project, a board member of Stearns County Human Services, and a board member of the Central Minnesota Mental Health Center and Foundation. He was a member of the Central Minnesota Council on Aging, a member of the Task Force for Regional Human Rights Committee of the Great River Interfaith Partnership, and a member of the Stearns County Historical Society.

Among other community services, Haws was a member of the Citizen Advisory Committee on Finance for School District 742, a board member of the Minnesota-North Dakota Alzheimer's Association, a member of the American Association of Retired Persons, a member of the Veterans Affairs Housing Project, a board member of the Retired and Senior Volunteer Program, and a board member of the Saint Cloud Kiwanis. He was also involved in the restoration of Bard Park, the oldest park in St. Cloud, and served on the Bard Park Historical Preservation Committee.

=== Later years ===
Haws was diagnosed with brain cancer in January 2011. He died on March 27, 2012.
