= Larry Howes =

American politician

Member of the Minnesota House of Representatives from the 4B district
- In office 1999 – January 7, 2013
- Preceded by: Tony Kinkel
- Succeeded by: district redrawn

Personal details
- Born: June 30, 1947 Minneapolis, Minnesota
- Died: June 10, 2023 (aged 75) Walker, Minnesota
- Party: Republican Party of Minnesota
- Spouse: Myrna
- Children: 5
- Profession: Business manager, legislator

Larry Howes (born June 30, 1947) is a Minnesota politician and former member of the Minnesota House of Representatives representing District 4B, which includes portions of Cass, Crow Wing and Hubbard counties in the northern part of the state. A Republican, he is also a summer camp manager and caretaker.

Howes was first elected in 1998, and was re-elected in 2000, 2002, 2004, 2006, 2008 and 2010. He was a member of the House Finance Committee and Rules and Legislative Administration Committee. He also served on the Finance subcommittees for the Capital Investment Finance Division, on which he was the ranking minority party member, the Cultural and Outdoor Resources Finance Division, and the Housing Finance and Policy and Public Health Finance Division. He chaired the Commerce and Financial Institutions Subcommittee for the Tourism Division during the 2005-2006 biennium.
