= John Ward (Minnesota politician) =

American politician (born 1950)

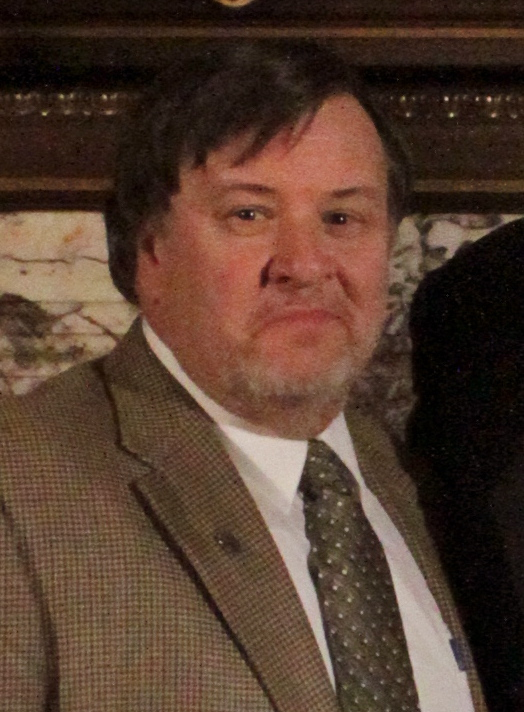

Member of the Minnesota House of Representatives from the 10A district 12A (2007–2013)
- In office January 3, 2007 – January 5, 2015
- Preceded by: Paul Gazelka
- Succeeded by: Josh Heintzeman

Personal details
- Born: August 2, 1950 (age 76) Duluth, Minnesota
- Party: Minnesota Democratic–Farmer–Labor Party
- Spouse: Sally Gfrerer
- Children: 4
- Education: University of Minnesota Duluth; University of Wisconsin-Superior
- Occupation: educator, insurance agent

John Ward (born August 2, 1950) is a Minnesota politician and former member of the Minnesota House of Representatives. A member of the Minnesota Democratic–Farmer–Labor Party, he represented District 10A, which included portions of Crow Wing County in the north central part of the state. He is also a retired teacher and coach.

== Early life, education, and career ==
Ward graduated from Proctor High School in Proctor, then went on to the University of Minnesota in Duluth, receiving his B.S. in Physical Education and Health, and also certification in coaching and driver's education, in 1973. He later returned to U.M.D., earning his M.A. in Learning Disabilities in 1982. He graduated from the University of Wisconsin in Superior in 1984, earning his E.B.D. teaching certificate in Emotional Behavior Disorders.

Ward worked as an adult basic education instructor at Northeast Regional Corrections Center from 1974 to 1979, as director of alternative education for Independent School District 704 in Proctor from 1979 to 1987, and as an emotional behavior disorder instructor for the Brainerd School System from 1987 to 2006. He has also been a property and casualty insurance agent for EPIC Insurance since 1995. He was a member of the Proctor City Council from 1982 to 1984, and served as Proctor's mayor from 1984 to 1987.

== Minnesota House of Representatives ==
=== Elections ===
Ward was first elected in 2006, and was re-elected in 2008, 2010, 2012. Ward lost re-election in 2014 to Josh Heintzeman.

2014 Minnesota State Representative- House 10A
Party	Candidate	Votes	%	±%
Democratic (DFL)	John Ward	7,538	46.54	
Republican	Josh Heintzeman	8,646	53.37	
