= Jeremy Kalin =

American politician

Member of the Minnesota House of Representatives from the 17B district
- In office January 3, 2007 – January 3, 2011
- Preceded by: Peter C. Nelson
- Succeeded by: Bob Barrett

Personal details
- Born: January 3, 1975 (age 51) St. Louis Park, Minnesota
- Party: Minnesota Democratic–Farmer–Labor Party
- Spouse: Hope (m. 2007)
- Children: 2
- Education: University of Minnesota (B.F.A.); University of New Mexico
- Occupation: Designer, draftsman, legislator

Jeremy N. Kalin (born January 3, 1975) is a Minnesota politician and former member of the Minnesota House of Representatives. A member of the Minnesota Democratic–Farmer–Labor Party (DFL), he represented District 17B, northeast of the Twin Cities metropolitan area. He was a candidate in the 2014 Minnesota Secretary of State election.

== Early life, education, and career ==
Kalin was born in St. Louis Park, Minnesota and grew up in Sioux City, Iowa. He graduated from Minneapolis South High School in Minneapolis. He attended the University of Minnesota, graduating with a B.F.A. in ceramics in 1996. From 2001 to 2003 he did graduate study in architecture and planning at the University of New Mexico in Albuquerque. Kalin was the sole proprietor of JNK Studio from 1995 to 2004 and also taught at Watershed High School in Minneapolis from 1996 to 2000.

== Minnesota House of Representatives ==
Kalin was first elected in 2006 and re-elected in 2008. He was a member of the House State and Local Government Operations Reform, Technology and Elections Committee, and also served on the Finance subcommittees for the Energy Finance and Policy Division and the State Government Finance Division, and on the State and Local Government Operations Reform, Technology and Elections Subcommittee for the Local Government Division.

On March 2, 2010, he announced that he would not seek a third term.

== 2014 Minnesota Secretary of State campaign ==
On July 9, 2013, Kalin announced his candidacy in the 2014 Minnesota Secretary of State election. He announced he was withdrawing on October 4, 2013.

== Personal life ==
Kalin was a member of Concerned River Valley Citizens from 1997 to 2001, of the Chisago County Gateway Task Force from 2003 to 2004, and of the East Central Regional Arts Council from 2005 to 2006, and he has been a member of the League of Women Voters since 2003.

He married his wife, Hope, on August 12, 2007. They have two children. Kalin is Jewish.
