= Carol McFarlane =

American politician (1950–2024)

Member of the Minnesota House of Representatives from the 53B district
- In office January 3, 2007 – January 7, 2013
- Preceded by: Doug Meslow
- Succeeded by: district redrawn

Personal details
- Born: September 27, 1950 Manhattan, Kansas, U.S.
- Died: May 26, 2024 (aged 73)
- Party: Republican
- Spouse: Patrick
- Children: 3
- Education: Lakewood State Junior College
- Profession: business owner, legislator

Carol Jean McFarlane (September 27, 1950 – May 26, 2024) was an American politician from the state of Minnesota. She was a Republican member of the Minnesota House of Representatives, representing District 53B, which included all or portions of North Oaks, White Bear Lake, and White Bear Township in northeastern Ramsey County, which is part of the Twin Cities metropolitan area.

McFarlane was first elected in 2006, and was re-elected in 2008 and 2010. She served as an assistant minority leader. She was a member of the House's K-12 Education Policy and Oversight Committee, on which she was the ranking minority party member, and also served on the Finance subcommittees for the Higher Education and Workforce Development Finance and Policy Division, the Housing Finance and Policy and Public Health Finance Division, the K-12 Education Finance Division, and the Transportation and Transit Policy and Oversight Division.

McFarlane graduated from White Bear Lake High School, then went on to Lakewood State Junior College, now called Century College, earning her A.A. degree. She is an owner and board member of Venburg Tire Company in Maplewood.

McFarlane was active in her community, serving on the White Bear Lake School Board from 2000 to 2006, as a member of the White Bear Lake Area Educational Foundation, as founding president of the White Bear Lake Area Alumni Association, as president and board member of the 916 Foundation, and as a co-chair of the northeast chapter of MICAH, an affordable housing resource organization.

She died on May 26, 2024, at the age of 73.
