= Paul Kohls =

American politician

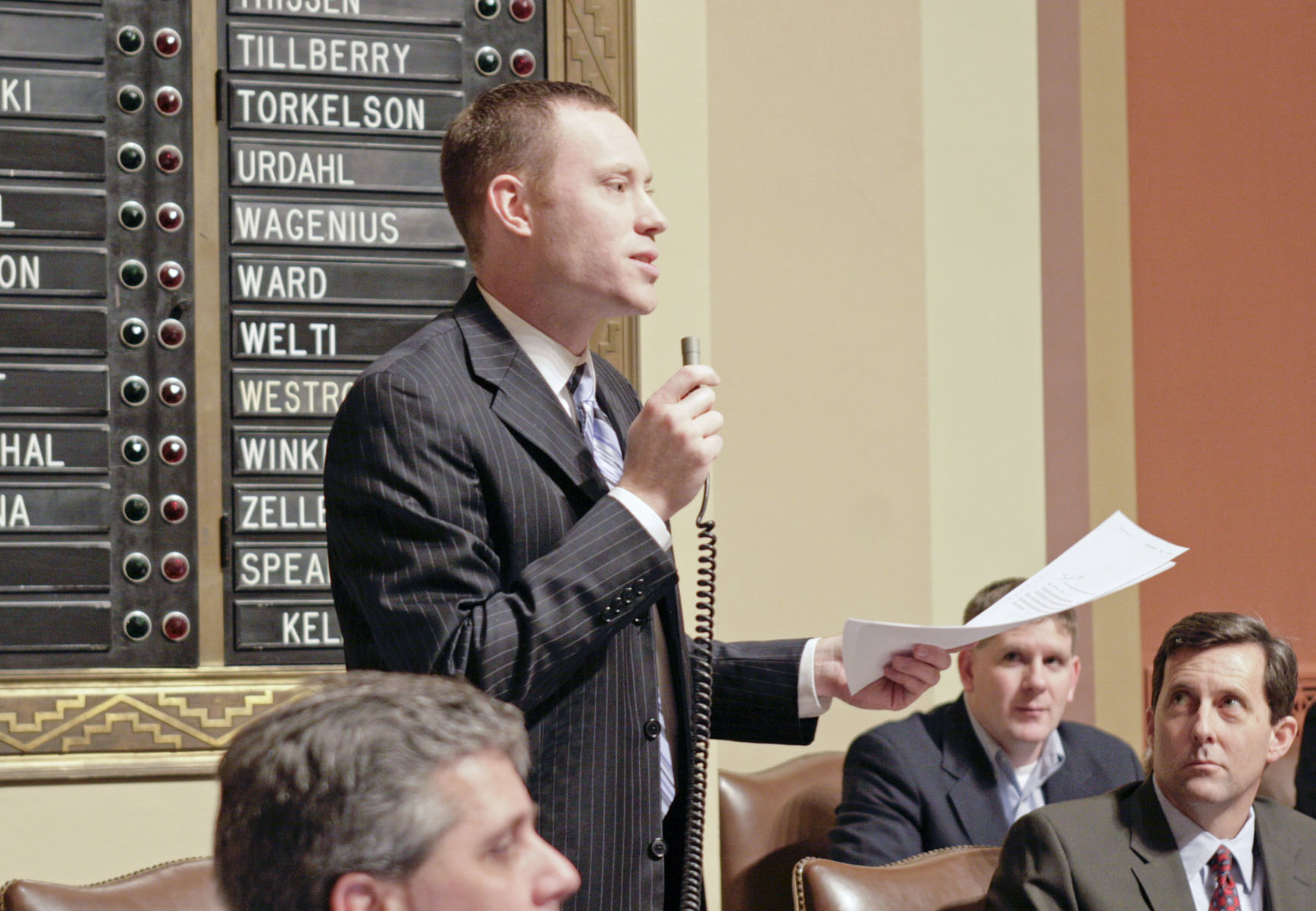

Member of the Minnesota House of Representatives from the 34A district
- In office January 7, 2003 – January 3, 2011
- Preceded by: Carol Molnau
- Succeeded by: Ernie Leidiger

Personal details
- Born: April 15, 1974 (age 52)
- Party: Republican Party of Minnesota
- Spouse: Kelly
- Children: Stanley, Caroline, and Henry
- Education: University of St. Thomas; University of Minnesota Law School
- Occupation: Attorney, senior manager, legislator
- Website: www.KohlsForGovernor.com

Paul Kohls (born April 15, 1974) is a Republican politician and a former member of the Minnesota House of Representatives who represented District 34A, which covers central and western Carver County and part of Scott County in the southern part of the state. He was first elected in 2002, and was re-elected in 2004, 2006 and 2008. After running for Minnesota Governor for several months in 2010, he dropped out, citing no support from party delegates. On May 3, 2010, he announced that he would not seek a fifth term, stating "I enjoyed the opportunity to be here for eight years and to serve my constituents, but I never intended to be here forever."

== Political career ==
Kohls was the lead Republican on the House Finance Subcommittee for the Public Safety Finance Division. He was also a member of the Taxes Committee, the Finance Committee, and the Public Safety Policy and Oversight Committee, and of the Public Safety Policy and Oversight Subcommittee for the Crime Victims/Criminal Records Division. As a legislator, he focused on improving Minnesota's tax and regulatory environment and garnered statewide attention with his spending freeze proposal in December 2008.

== Private sector experience ==
Kohls worked as an attorney at the former Minneapolis law firm of Rider Bennett and as a law clerk at the Minnesota Court of Appeals. He worked as an attorney and senior manager at Allianz Life Insurance Company. He took a leave of absence from that position to focus on his campaign for Governor. After withdrawing from the gubernatorial race, he accepted a job with AgStar Financial Services of Mankato, one of the nation's largest farm credit associations.

== Education and family ==
Kohls attended college at the University of St. Thomas in Saint Paul. He was active in College Republicans during college, and was a member of the football team during his first year. He graduated in 1996 with a B.A. in political science, summa cum laude. He continued his education at the University of Minnesota Law School, receiving his J.D., cum laude, in 1999.

Kohls is married to Kelly (Yetzer) and has three children, Stanley, Caroline and Henry.
