= Paul Gardner (Minnesota politician) =

American politician

Member of the Minnesota House of Representatives from the 53A district
- In office January 3, 2007 – January 3, 2011
- Preceded by: Phil Krinkie
- Succeeded by: Linda Runbeck

Personal details
- Born: 1967 (age 58–59) Glen Cove, New York, U.S.
- Party: Democratic (DFL)
- Spouse: Michelle
- Children: 2
- Education: Grinnell College; University of Minnesota
- Profession: executive director, legislator

Paul Gardner (born 1967) is a Minnesota politician and a former member of the Minnesota House of Representatives who represented District 53A, which includes all or portions of the northern suburbs of Lino Lakes, Circle Pines, Lexington, North Oaks, Shoreview and Blaine. A Democrat, he was first elected in 2006 in a huge upset, narrowly defeating 16-year incumbent Rep. Phil Krinkie by 51 votes. He was re-elected in 2008, defeating challenger John Louis Kappler by 1035 votes, but was unseated by Republican former state senator Linda Runbeck in the 2010 general election.

Gardner has a Master of Public Affairs degree from the University of Minnesota and a Bachelor of Arts degree in History from Grinnell College. He was also the Executive Director of the Recycling Association of Minnesota (RAM), a nonprofit group providing leadership at the Capitol and within industry to promote recycling.

Gardner has made a name for himself through his strong advocacy for government transparency and responsiveness. In 2007, he launched his own blog which informs his constituents of his daily activities, visitors to his office, and a summary of every single letter or phone call that his office receives.
