= John Benson (Minnesota politician) =

American politician

Member of the Minnesota House of Representatives from the 44B district 43B (2007–2013)
- In office January 3, 2007 – January 6, 2015
- Preceded by: Ron Abrams
- Succeeded by: Jon Applebaum

Personal details
- Born: July 30, 1943 (age 83) Glasgow, Montana
- Party: Minnesota Democratic–Farmer–Labor Party
- Spouse: Barbara
- Children: 2
- Education: Mankato State University; University of Minnesota
- Occupation: Educator, legislator

John H. Benson (born July 30, 1943) is a Minnesota politician and former member of the Minnesota House of Representatives. A member of the Minnesota Democratic–Farmer–Labor Party (DFL), he represented District 44B, which includes portions of western Hennepin County in the Twin Cities metropolitan area.

== Minnesota House of Representatives ==
Benson was first elected in 2006 and re-elected in 2008, 2010, and 2012. He announced on December 18, 2013, that he would not run for re-election in 2014.
