= Tom Tillberry =

American politician

Member of the Minnesota House of Representatives from the 51B district
- In office 2007 – January 7, 2013
- Preceded by: Connie Bernardy
- Succeeded by: district redrawn

Personal details
- Born: May 4, 1964 (age 62) Waukesha, Wisconsin
- Party: Minnesota Democratic-Farmer-Labor Party
- Spouse: Kimberly
- Children: 2
- Education: Winona State University
- Profession: educator, counselor, legislator

Thomas Tillberry (born May 4, 1964) is a Minnesota politician and former member of the Minnesota House of Representatives representing District 51B, which included portions of Anoka and Ramsey counties in the northern part of the Twin Cities metropolitan area. A Democrat, he is also a counselor at Roseville Area High School in Roseville.

Tillberry was first elected in 2006, and was re-elected in 2008 and 2010. He was a member of the House's Taxes Committee and Ways and Means Committee. He also served on the Finance Subcommittee for the K-12 Education Finance Division and the Taxes Subcommittee for the Property and Local Sales Tax Division.

Tillberry attended Winona Senior High School in Winona, then went on to Winona State University, receiving a B.A. in Political Science. He later earned his M.A. in Counseling from Winona State. He is also a former admissions counselor for Winona State.

Tillberry served as a member and treasurer of the Fridley School Board from 2005 to 2006. He was a union negotiator for the Roseville Chapter of Education Minnesota, and a delegate to the National Education Association. He has also been a member of Dads Make a Difference, a teen pregnancy reduction program, and is a co-founder of DCCST, a district-wide crisis intervention team. He and has wife have worked as interfaith medical missioners to Nigeria, Guatemala and Haiti.
