= Morrie Lanning =

American politician

Member of the Minnesota House of Representatives from the 9A district
- In office January 7, 2003 – January 7, 2013
- Preceded by: Kevin Goodno
- Succeeded by: district redrawn

Mayor of Moorhead, Minnesota
- In office January 1, 1980 – December 31, 2001

Personal details
- Born: August 27, 1944 (age 82) Portland, Oregon
- Party: Republican Party of Minnesota
- Spouse: Ruthie
- Children: 2
- Education: Concordia College - Moorhead; North Dakota State University
- Profession: Dean of students, legislator, mayor

Morris L. "Morrie" Lanning (born August 27, 1944, in Portland, Oregon) is a Minnesota politician and former member of the Minnesota House of Representatives representing District 9A, which included portions of Clay County in the northwestern part of the state. A Republican, he is a retired vice president for student affairs and dean of students at Concordia College in Moorhead.

Lanning was first elected in 2002, and was re-elected in 2004, 2006, 2008 and 2010. He was a member of the House's State and Local Government Operations Reform, Technology and Elections Committee and the Taxes Committee. He also served on the Finance Subcommittee for the Capital Investment Finance Division, on the State and Local Government Operations Reform, Technology and Elections Subcommittee for the Local Government Division, and on the Taxes Subcommittee for the Property and Local Sales Tax Division. He was appointed by Governor Tim Pawlenty to the Minnesota Statehood Sesquicentennial Commission, serving from 2006 to 2008.

Prior to being elected to the legislature, Lanning was active in city government in his hometown of Moorhead, first on the city council from 1974 to 1979, and then as mayor for 21 years from 1980 to 2001. During his time as mayor, he served as president of the Coalition of Greater Minnesota Cities, as a founding board member of the Greater Minnesota Housing Fund, as a board member of the League of Minnesota Cities, as founder and board member of the Rural Initiatives Coalition, and as president of the Minnesota Mayors Association.

Lanning graduated from Moorhead High School, then attended Concordia College in Moorhead, graduating with a B.A. in psychology, history and political science. He later attended North Dakota State University in Fargo, earning a M.S. in guidance and counseling.
