= Brita Sailer =

American politician

Member of the Minnesota House of Representatives from the 2B district
- In office January 4, 2005 – January 3, 2011
- Preceded by: Doug Lindgren
- Succeeded by: Dave Hancock

Personal details
- Born: 1953 (age 72–73) Alexandria, Minnesota, U.S.
- Party: Democratic (DFL)
- Spouse: Phillip
- Children: 2
- Education: Moorhead State University (BA)
- Profession: teacher, artist, legislator

Brita J. Sailer (born 1953) is a Minnesota politician and a former member of the Minnesota House of Representatives who represented District 2B, which includes all or portions of Beltrami, Clearwater, Hubbard, Pennington and Polk counties in the northwestern part of the state. A Democrat, she is an art teacher, freelance artist and consultant.

Sailer was first elected in 2004, and was re-elected in 2006 and 2008. She was unseated by Republican Dave Hancock in the 2010 general election. She was a member of the House Environment Policy and Oversight Committee, and was vice chair of the Environment Policy and Oversight Subcommittee for the Game, Fish and Forestry Division. She also served on the Commerce and Labor Subcommittee for the Telecommunications Regulation and Infrastructure Division, and on the Finance subcommittees for the Energy Finance and Policy Division and the Housing Finance and Policy and Public Health Finance Division.

Sailer attended Alexandria High School in Alexandria, then went on to Moorhead State University in Moorhead, earning her BA in Art. She was a Hubbard County Soil and Water Conservation District Supervisor, and also served as Area 1 Director on the Minnesota Association of Soil and Water Conservation Districts.
