= Rob Eastlund =

American politician

Member of the Minnesota House of Representatives from the 17A district
- In office January 3, 2001 – January 3, 2011
- Preceded by: Jim Rostberg
- Succeeded by: Kurt Daudt

Personal details
- Born: June 19, 1949 (age 77) Braham, Minnesota, U.S.
- Party: Republican
- Spouse: Janis
- Children: 3
- Education: University of Minnesota
- Profession: Business owner, property manager, legislator

Robert B. "Rob" Eastlund (born June 19, 1949) is a Minnesota politician and a former member of the Minnesota House of Representatives who represented District 17A, which includes portions of Anoka, Chisago and Isanti counties in the east-central part of the state just north of the Twin Cities metropolitan area. A Republican, he is also a business owner and property manager.

== Life and career ==
Eastlund graduated from Cambridge-Isanti High School in Cambridge, then went on to University of Minnesota in Minneapolis, earning his B.S. in Mathematics in 1972. He was a high school mathematics teacher and football coach from 1972–1978, and a dairy and crop farmer from 1978-1993. He has been president of the Cambridge Business Development Company since 1990, and president and owner of RIC Property Management since 1994. He served on the Cambridge-Isanti School Board from 1983-1995.

Active in his local community, Eastlund is a member of the Cambridge Development Alliance and the Cambridge Chamber of Commerce. He is also a member of the National Association of Realtors and of the Building Owners and Managers Association.

Eastlund was first elected to the House in 2000, and was re-elected in 2002, 2004, 2006 and 2008. Prior to the 2002 legislative redistricting, he represented the old District 18A. He was a member of the House Taxes Committee, and also served on the Finance subcommittees for the Capital Investment Finance Division, the Higher Education and Workforce Development Finance and Policy Division, and the Public Safety Finance Division, and on the State and Local Government Operations Reform, Technology and Elections Subcommittee for the Local Government Division, on which he was the ranking minority party member.

On March 25, 2010, he announced that he would not seek a sixth term, stating that "the relentless schedule of the legislative session, special sessions, phone calls and family interruptions and the never-ending campaigning has left little time for my family or anything else."
