= Laura Brod =

American politician (born 1971)

Laura Brod Hameed

Member of the Minnesota House of Representatives from the 25A district
- In office January 7, 2003 – January 3, 2011
- Preceded by: John Tuma
- Succeeded by: Glenn Gruenhagen

Personal details
- Born: December 11, 1971 (age 54) New Prague, Minnesota, U.S.
- Party: Republican
- Spouse(s): Wade Brod (m. 1994–2012) (marriage, Adam Abdul Hameed 2018)
- Children: 2 children and 4 stepchildren
- Education: University of Minnesota, Twin Cities, Summa Cum Laude; Minnesota State University, Mankato

Laura Brod (née Morris; born December 11, 1971) is an American entrepreneur and former politician having been an elected at-large member of the University of Minnesota Board of Regents, and a former member of the Minnesota House of Representatives who represented District 25A, which includes portions of Le Sueur, Scott and Sibley counties in the south central part of the state.

== Background and education ==
Brod graduated from New Prague High School in New Prague. She received her B.A. in Geography and Russian Area Studies summa cum laude and phi beta kappa from the University of Minnesota, and later attended Minnesota State University in Mankato, earning her M.A. in Urban and Regional Studies. A small business owner, she served on the New Prague City Council from 1999-2002. She married her now ex-husband, Wade, in 1994. The Brods later divorced in 2012 and remain friends. Brod married Adam Hameed in 2018. Mr. Hameed is a healthcare tech executive and together they have 6 children.

== Service in the Minnesota House ==
A Republican, Brod was first elected to the House in 2002, and was re-elected in 2004, 2006 and 2008. She was a member of the House Finance Committee, the Health Care and Human Services Policy and Oversight Committee, and the Taxes Committee. She also served on the Finance Subcommittee for the Health Care and Human Services Finance Division. She served as an assistant majority leader in 2006, and as an assistant minority leader during the 2007-2008 biennium. On May 4, 2010, she announced that she would not seek a fifth term, stating that it was her belief "that the time for others to serve in the Legislature for our district has come, and my time to find other challenges and ways to contribute is upon me."

== University of Minnesota regent ==
Brod and former Minnesota House Speaker Steve Sviggum were elected to the University of Minnesota's Board of Regents on February 21, 2011, by a joint meeting of the Minnesota House and Senate. She serves a six-year term on the 12-member body, which is charged with overseeing the University of Minnesota system.

== Gubernatorial considerations ==
Brod was considered a leading gubernatorial candidate to succeed retiring Gov. Tim Pawlenty, but withdrew from the race due to medical concerns. She has not ruled out running at a later time.

== Biotech Executive ==
Due to her personal experience with cancer, Brod entered the world of Biotech as the CEO of Genesegues Therapeutics. Genesegues, Inc. had developed a precision targeted anti-cancer drug aimed at head and neck cancer and other cancers. As CEO, Brod scaled the company and brought in angel funding. During the development of the platform crystalline ultra-small nanoparticle (CUSP) for Genesegues, the technology was licensed into a spin-off company called RoverMed BioSciences. Brod became CEO of RoverMed and developed the strategy and led funding acquisition for the company. RoverMed intended to use the platform drug delivery technology to deliver drugs from other biotechs and pharmaceutical companies. RoverMed's technology was acquired. Brod subsequently joined the Columbus Children's Foundation (CCF) as Executive Director. CCF is a novel nonprofit biotech with the mission of accelerating the most effective gene therapy treatments for children with ultra rare genetic diseases. CCF was one of the first nonprofit biotechs in the gene therapy space with the desire to ensure no children are left behind when science can put a cure in reach. CCF is focused on ensuring equitable access to affordable genetic medicine to children throughout the world.
