= Linda Slocum =

American politician

Member of the Minnesota House of Representatives from the 50A district 63B (2007–2013)
- In office January 3, 2007 – January 7, 2019
- Preceded by: Dan Larson
- Succeeded by: Michael Howard

Personal details
- Born: July 11, 1950 (age 76) Minneapolis, Minnesota
- Party: Minnesota Democratic–Farmer–Labor Party
- Children: 2
- Education: Simpson College; Augsburg College
- Profession: educator

Linda J. Slocum (born July 11, 1950) is an American politician and former member of the Minnesota House of Representatives. A member of the Minnesota Democratic–Farmer–Labor Party (DFL), she represented District 50A, which included portions of the cities of Bloomington and Richfield in Hennepin County, which is part of the Twin Cities metropolitan area. She was a geography and American history teacher at Field Middle School in Minneapolis.

== Early life, education, and career ==
Slocum graduated from Simpson College in Indianola, Iowa with a B.A. in Psychology, and also took graduate studies in education at Augsburg College in Minneapolis. She is a union steward with Local 59 of the Minnesota Federation of Teachers. Prior to being elected to the House, she served as Vice Chair of the Richfield Human Services Commission, and as a member of the Richfield Community Service Commission. She was also a member of the Minnesota Commission on Crime Prevention and Control.

== Minnesota House of Representatives ==
Slocum was first elected in 2006, and was re-elected in 2008, 2010, 2012, 2014, and 2016. On May 6, 2018, she announced she would not be seeking re-election.

== Legislative Action ==
She voted against the 'Sunday Sales' amendment to the 2015 Liquor Omnibus.

She voted for the 'Sunday Sales' amendment in 2016.

In 2018 she introduced HF 3022, a very restrictive and controversial anti-gun legislation. The proposed legislation would require that firearm owners' homes be searched annually by law enforcement. It also mandates that anyone behind on child support payments would be required to forfeit their guns.
