= Julie Bunn =

American politician

Member of the Minnesota House of Representatives from the 56A district
- In office January 3, 2007 – January 3, 2011
- Preceded by: Michael Charron
- Succeeded by: Kathy Lohmer

Personal details
- Born: November 23, 1957 (age 68) Pasadena, California
- Party: Minnesota Democratic-Farmer-Labor Party
- Spouse: Marlon Gunderson
- Children: 1
- Education: Occidental College; Stanford University; John F. Kennedy School of Government; Humphrey Institute
- Profession: economist, legislator

Julie Bunn (born November 23, 1957) is a Minnesota politician and a former member of the Minnesota House of Representatives representing District 56A, which includes portions of Washington County in the eastern Twin Cities metropolitan area. A Democrat, she is also an economist, policy analyst and consultant.

Bunn was first elected in 2006, and was re-elected in 2008. She was unseated by Republican Kathy Lohmer in her 2010 re-election bid. She was a member of the House's Health Care and Human Services Policy and Oversight Committee and Ways and Means Committee, and also served as vice chair of the Health Care and Human Services Policy and Oversight Subcommittee for the Licensing Division, and was a member of the Finance Subcommittee for the Health Care and Human Services Finance Division. Bunn ran for Minnesota Senate in 2012 and lost a close race to Karin Housley.

Bunn attended John Muir High School in Pasadena, California, then went on to Occidental College in Los Angeles, receiving her A.B. in economics. She received her M.A. and her Ph.D. in economics from Stanford University in Stanford, California. She participated in graduate studies at Harvard University's John F. Kennedy School of Government under a Pew Fellowship, studying international affairs from 1994 to 1995, and at the University of Minnesota's Humphrey Institute as a Policy Forum Fellow from 1996 to 1997.

Bunn worked as an economist for the United States Department of Labor's Bureau of Labor Statistics in Washington D.C. from 1979 to 1983. She was a research and teaching assistant at Stanford University from 1984 to 1989, and also taught at Macalester College in Saint Paul from 1992 to 2000. She served on the Lake Elmo Planning Commission from 2000 to 2004.
