= Steve Gottwalt =

American politician

Member of the Minnesota House of Representatives from the 15A district
- In office January 3, 2007 – January 7, 2013
- Preceded by: Jim Knoblach
- Succeeded by: district redrawn

Personal details
- Born: October 16, 1961 (age 65) Minneapolis, Minnesota
- Party: Republican Party of Minnesota
- Spouse: Paula
- Children: 5
- Education: College of St. Thomas
- Profession: Insurance broker, legislator

Steven M. "Steve" Gottwalt (born October 16, 1961) is a Minnesota politician and former member of the Minnesota House of Representatives. A member of the Republican Party of Minnesota, he represented District 15A, which included portions of Stearns County in the west central part of the state. He is also an insurance salesman and the owner of Steve Gottwalt Consulting.

== Education and professional background ==
Gottwalt graduated from St. John's Preparatory School in Collegeville, then went on to the College of St. Thomas in Saint Paul, earning his B.A. in Journalism and English in 1984. He participated in the United States Air Force Reserve Officers Training Corps (ROTC, not to be confused with military service) from 1983-1985. He worked as a radio broadcaster for KSJR-FM and WJON, and later as a network contract manager for Medica Health Plans (1995–1996), as director of network contracting for United HealthCare's seniors program EverCare (1996–1997), as director of communications for the Diocese of St. Cloud (1997–2006,) and as director of communications and consumer affairs for regional grocer Coborn's Inc. (2006-2011). In 2011, Gottwalt launched his own business, Steve Gottwalt Consulting LLC, providing communications, PR and benefits consulting services.

== Community service and leadership ==
Gottwalt has been a member of the St. Cloud, Minnesota, Chamber of Commerce, the St. Cloud Area Economic Development Partnership, the St. Cloud Regional Airport Board, and the Central Minnesota Transportation Alliance. He was chair of the St. Cloud Area Human Services Council from 1992–1995, a board member of the St. Cloud Area Planning Organization from 1997–1999, a board member of the Great River Regional Library from 1999–2001, and a member of the St. Cloud mayor's Government Reform and Efficiency Task Force from 1999–2001. He was a member of the St. Cloud City Council from 1997–2006, also serving as the council's vice president during that time. Gottwalt has also served as spokesman and communications director for the Roman Catholic Diocese of Saint Cloud.

== Minnesota House of Representatives ==
Gottwalt was first elected in 2006, and was re-elected in 2008, 2010. In 2012, he was re-elected to the newly drawn District 14A seat but resigned before the beginning of the new legislative session. He is a former chair of the House Health and Human Services Reform Committee, and also served on the Health and Human Services Finance, Taxes, and Ways & Means committees. During his tenure, Gottwalt sponsored an amendment to the Minnesota Constitution that would have banned same-sex marriage. Voters rejected the amendment in 2012.

On January 3, 2013, Gottwalt announced his intention to vacate his seat before the end of the month to join the Center for Diagnostic Imaging as its director of state legislative policy. He vacated his seat on January 7, 2013.

== Political controversies ==
=== Connections to Obamacare ===
In 2011, Gottwalt came under fire from some conservatives in his party for supporting elements of Barack Obama's Patient Protection and Affordable Care Act. The conservative Citizens' Council for Health Freedom stated that he was attempting to implement the "command and control" infrastructure of Obamacare. Gottwalt subsequently withdrew the legislation.

=== Health insurance conflict of interest ===
Gottwalt came under the scrutiny of members of the House Ethics Committee in 2012 when lawmakers from that committee asked whether an arrangement violated ethics rules. The arrangement in question occurred in 2011, when Gottwalt sponsored the Healthy Minnesota Contribution Program, a bill that diverted Minnesotans receiving MinnesotaCare to the private insurance market. The legislation was part of the Republican agenda during the government shutdown and was passed in July of that year. Gottwalt then obtained a license for himself to sell insurance and joined Boys and Tyler, a firm that actively lobbied for the bill. In his Statement of Economic Interests, filed with the Minnesota Campaign Finance Board, Gottwalt failed to disclose his insurance sales business activities. When questioned about the conflict of interest, he defended his relationship to John Tyler, owner of Boys and Tyler, saying "The fact that I'm involved in that doesn't mean we were sneakily trying to come up with something to benefit ourselves. It's actually the other way around because we worked together."
