= Terry Morrow =

American politician

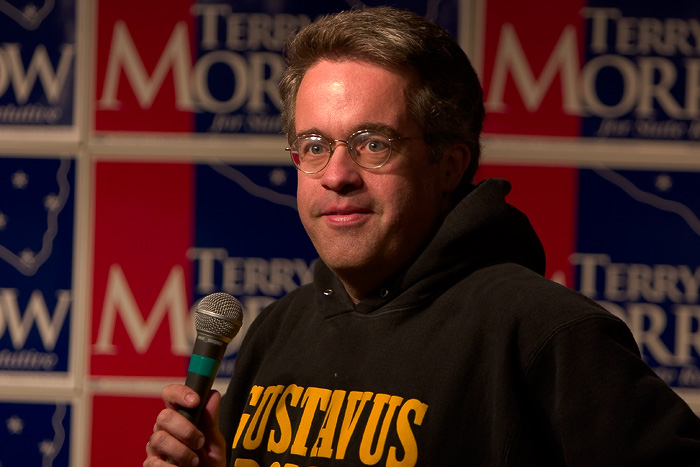

Member of the Minnesota House of Representatives from the 23A district
- In office January 3, 2007 – January 7, 2013
- Preceded by: Ruth Johnson
- Succeeded by: district redrawn

Personal details
- Born: October 22, 1963 (age 62) New York City, New York
- Party: Minnesota Democratic–Farmer–Labor Party
- Spouse: Martha Devine
- Children: 2
- Education: University of California Berkeley; University of California Davis; Northwestern University
- Profession: Educator, legislator

Terry Morrow (born October 22, 1963) is a Minnesota politician and a former member of the Minnesota House of Representatives. As a member of the Minnesota Democratic–Farmer–Labor Party (DFL), he represented District 23A, which included portions of Nicollet and Sibley counties.

== Minnesota House of Representatives ==
He was first elected in 2006, and was re-elected in 2008, 2010. In 2012, he was re-elected to the newly drawn District 19A seat, but resigned before the beginning of the new legislative session.

Morrow served as an assistant majority leader during the 2009–2010 biennium. He is a former member of the House Agriculture, Rural Economies & Veterans Affairs Committee; the House State and Local Government Operations Reform, Technology & Elections Committee; and of the Finance subcommittees for the Transportation and Transit Policy and Oversight Division; and the Transportation Finance and Policy Division. On November 16, 2010, incoming Minority Leader Paul Thissen announced that he would be one of four Minority Whips during the 2011–2012 legislative session.

On December 19, 2012, Morrow announced he will be stepping down at the end of his current term to join the National Conference of Commissioners on Uniform State Laws as its legislative director.

== Personal life ==
Morrow was a communication studies professor (1995-2013) at Gustavus Adolphus College in Saint Peter, Minnesota, where he also resides. Prior to running for the House, Morrow served on the Saint Peter School Board for several years.
