= Mary Liz Holberg =

American politician

Member of the Minnesota House of Representatives from the 58A district 37B (1999–2003), 36A (2003–13)
- In office January 5, 1999 – January 5, 2015
- Preceded by: Bill Macklin
- Succeeded by: Jon Koznick

Personal details
- Born: November 13, 1959 (age 66)
- Party: Republican Party of Minnesota
- Spouse: Thomas
- Children: 2
- Education: Normandale Community College; St. Cloud State University
- Occupation: legislator

Mary Liz Holberg (born November 13, 1959) is a Minnesota politician, member of the Dakota County, Minnesota Board of Commissioners, and former member of the Minnesota House of Representatives. A member of the Republican Party of Minnesota, she represented District 58A, which encompasses most of the city of Lakeville in Dakota County.

== Minnesota House of Representatives ==
She was first elected in 1998, and was re-elected every two years until her retirement in 2015. Prior to the 2002 legislative redistricting, she represented the old District 37B.

She was an assistant majority leader during the 2001–02 session. She chaired the House Civil Law Committee during the 2003–04 session, and the House Transportation Finance Committee during the 2005–06 session.

On November 20, 2003, Holberg and then State Senator Michele Bachmann proposed a constitutional amendment that would define marriage as one man and one woman.

On May 21, 2011, she joined the House Republican majority in voting for 2012 Minnesota Amendment 1, a proposed constitutional amendment to define marriage as between a man and woman. The amendment was rejected by a majority of Minnesota voters.

Holberg announced on February 22, 2014, that she would not be seeking re-election.

== Dakota County Board of Commissioners ==
In 2014, Holberg campaigned for the open seat on the Dakota County Board of Commissioners vacated by retiring commissioner Paul Krause. Holberg received 62 percent of the vote in that election. She won re-election to the seat in 2022.
