= Mindy Greiling =

American politician (born 1948)

Member of the Minnesota House of Representatives from the 54A district
- In office January 5, 1993 – 2013
- Preceded by: Don Valento

Personal details
- Born: February 28, 1948 (age 78) Rochester, Minnesota, U.S.
- Party: Democratic Farmer Labor Party
- Spouse: Roger
- Children: 2
- Education: Gustavus Adolphus College; University of Minnesota
- Occupation: legislator

Mindy Greiling is a former Minnesota politician and a member of the Minnesota House of Representatives who represented the former districts 54B and 54A in Ramsey County, part of the Twin Cities metropolitan area. (These districts have since been divided among other districts by redistricting.) District 54B included parts of Roseville and Little Canada, while District 54A included portions of Roseville, St. Anthony, and Lauderdale. She is a member of the Minnesota Democratic-Farmer-Labor Party (DFL).

Greiling served 10 terms in the Minnesota House. She was first elected in 1992 in the old District 54B after serving on the Roseville School Board for five years. Following redistricting in 2002, her home became part of 54A. This district was previously represented by Mary Jo McGuire, who retired from the legislature to avoid running against a fellow Democrat in her new district, 66B.

Greiling is an advocate of education, environmental issues, and mental health issues. She served as the K-12 Education Finance Committee Chair. She founded and chaired the Mental Health Caucus, a bipartisan committee formed from the Minnesota House and the Minnesota Senate. She also served as an assistant minority leader during the 2003-2004 Legislative Session.

In January, 2012, before the redistricting following the 2010 Census, Greiling announced that she would not seek reelection in 2012.

After leaving the legislature, Greiling wrote about her experiences dealing with the mental health system as the mother of a son with schizophrenia. The book, Fix What You Can: Schizophrenia and a Lawmaker's Fight for Her Son, was published in 2020 by the University of Minnesota Press.

Greiling graduated from Gustavus Adolphus College in 1970 and obtained a master's degree in education from the University of Minnesota in 1975. She is married to Roger Greiling and has two children.

== Electoral history ==
- 2010 Race for Minnesota State House - District 54A
  - Mindy Greiling (Democratic-Farmer-Labor) 9,997 (59.33%)
  - Mark Fotsch (Republican) 6,835 (40.57%)
- 2008 Race for Minnesota State House - District 54A
  - Mindy Greiling (Democratic-Farmer-Labor) 12,693 (57%)
  - Mark Laliberte (Republican) 9,402 (43%)
- 2006 Race for Minnesota State House - District 54A
  - Mindy Greiling (Democratic-Farmer-Labor) 11,662 (64.62%)
  - Bryan Graham (Republican) 6,368 votes (35.29%)
- 2004 Race for Minnesota State House - District 54A
  - Mindy Greiling (Democratic-Farmer-Labor) 13,059 (59.46%)
  - Teri Graham (Republican) 8,876 votes (40.42%)
- 2002 Race for Minnesota State House - District 54A
  - Mindy Greiling (Democratic-Farmer-Labor) 10,338 (52.90%)
  - Julie Ward (Republican) 8,718 (44.61%)
  - Andrew Abruzzese (Green) 476 (2.44%)
- 2000 Race for Minnesota State House - District 54B
  - Mindy Greiling (Democratic-Farmer-Labor) 11,743 (64.94%)
  - Roger Loveland (Republican) 8,718 (35.06%)
- 1998 Race for Minnesota State House - District 54B
  - Mindy Greiling (Democratic-Farmer-Labor) 9,950 (60.90%)
  - Roger Loveland (Republican) 6,360 (38.90%)
