= Andy Welti =

American politician

Member of the Minnesota House of Representatives from the 30B district
- In office 2005–2011
- Preceded by: Bill Kuisle
- Succeeded by: Mike Benson

Personal details
- Born: May 28, 1980 (age 46) Plainview, Minnesota
- Party: Minnesota Democratic-Farmer-Labor Party
- Education: Minnesota State University, Mankato
- Profession: educator, legislator

Andy J. Welti (born May 28, 1980) was a member of the Minnesota House of Representatives. A Democrat, he was first elected in 2004, defeating four-term incumbent Republican Bill Kuisle. Just 24 years of age at the time, his victory over Kuisle (who served as chair of the Transportation Committee, and was also a member of the Ways and Means Committee) was regarded as a significant political upset in the traditionally Republican area.

Welti represented District 30B, which includes portions of Rochester and largely rural areas of Olmsted, Winona, and Wabasha counties, including the towns of Stewartville, Dover, Eyota, Chatfield, part of St. Charles, and his home town of Plainview. His parents continue to own and operate a farm located just outside Plainview.

Welti won re-election in 2006 with 52% of the vote and again in 2008 with 56% of the vote. Both contests were re-matches against Kuisle. In the aftermath of the 2008 election, he was elected by his DFL colleagues as one of eight assistant majority leaders. He was unseated by Republican Mike Benson in the 2010 general election. During his time in the legislature, his work has focused largely on veteran's affairs, education, agriculture and alternative energy.

== Committee assignments ==
Committees served on during the 2009-10 biennium:

- Agriculture, Rural Economies and Veterans Affairs Finance Division
- Energy Finance and Policy Division Committee
- Higher Education and Workforce Development Finance and Policy Division
- Transportation and Transit Policy and Oversight Division
- Transportation Finance and Policy Division

Committees served on during the 2007-08 biennium:

- Energy Finance and Policy Division
- Higher Education and Work Force Development Policy and Finance Division
- E-12 Education
- Agriculture, Rural Economics, and Veterans Affairs Division.

Committees served on during the 2005-06 biennium:

- Agriculture and Rural Development
- Environment and Natural Resources
- Governmental Operations and Veterans Affairs

2010 Minnesota State Representative- House 30B
Party	Candidate	Votes	%	±%
Democratic (DFL)	Andy Welti (Incumbent)	8802	47.55	
Republican	Mike Benson	9692	52.36	

2008 Minnesota State Representative- House 30B
Party	Candidate	Votes	%	±%
Democratic (DFL)	Andy Welti (Incumbent)	13,478	55.55	+3.70
Republican	Bill Kuisle	10,763	44.36	−3.69

2006 Minnesota State Representative- House 30B
Party	Candidate	Votes	%	±%
Democratic (DFL)	Andy Welti (Incumbent)	9,634	51.85	+0.58
Republican	Bill Kuisle	8,928	48.05	−0.62

2004 Minnesota State Representative- House 30B
Party	Candidate	Votes	%	±%
Democratic (DFL)	Andy Welti	11,292	51.27	−
Republican	Bill Kuisle (Incumbent)	10,720	48.67	−22.14

Preceded by William Kuisle	Minnesota State Representative for District 30B; 2004-2011	Succeeded by Mike Benson
