= Ron Shimanski =

American politician

Member of the Minnesota House of Representatives from the 18A district
- In office January 3, 2007 – January 7, 2013
- Preceded by: Scott Newman
- Succeeded by: district redrawn

Personal details
- Born: November 23, 1952 (age 73) Hutchinson, Minnesota
- Party: Republican Party of Minnesota
- Children: 3
- Education: St. Cloud State College; Willmar Community College
- Profession: Farmer, layout and design technician, legislator

Ronald "Ron" Shimanski (born November 23, 1952) is a Minnesota politician and former member of the Minnesota House of Representatives representing District 18A, which included portions of McLeod and Meeker counties in the south central part of the state. A Republican, he is also a crop, beef cattle and apple orchard farmer, and a layout and design technician.

== Career ==
Shimanski was first elected to the House in 2006, opting to run after two-term Rep. Scott Newman decided not to seek re-election. He was re-elected in 2008 and 2010, running unopposed in 2010. He served as an assistant minority whip, and was a member of the House's Agriculture, Rural Economies and Veterans Affairs Committee, the Ethics Committee, the Finance Committee, and the Public Safety Policy and Oversight Committee. He also served on the Finance Subcommittee for the Agriculture, Rural Economies and Veterans Affairs Finance Division, and on the Public Safety Policy and Oversight Subcommittee for the Crime Victims/Criminal Records Division, of which he was vice chair.

Shimanski graduated from Silver Lake High School in Silver Lake. He attended college at St. Cloud State College in St. Cloud, taking business and management courses, and at Willmar Community College in Willmar, earning his AS in Agricultural Business.
