= Kathy Brynaert =

American politician (born 1944)

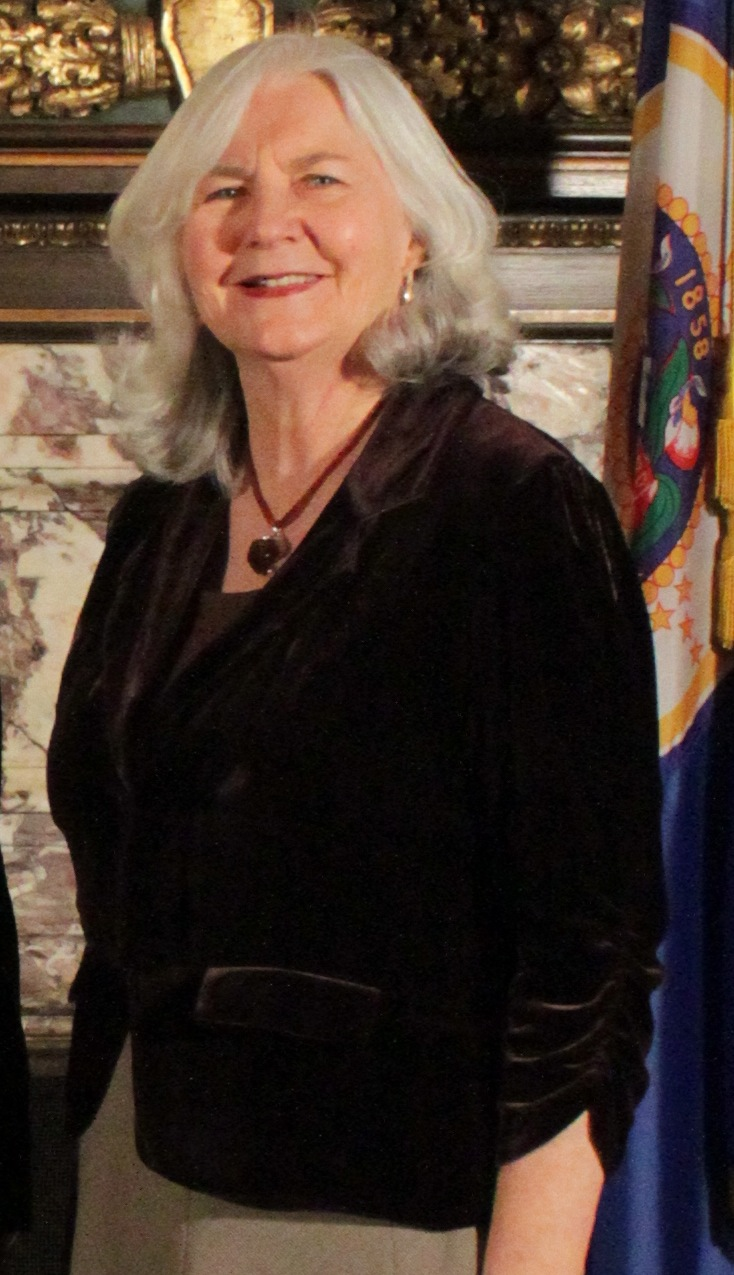

Member of the Minnesota House of Representatives from the 19B district 23B (2007–2013)
- In office January 3, 2007 – January 5, 2015
- Preceded by: John W. Dorn
- Succeeded by: Jack Considine

Personal details
- Born: July 15, 1944 (age 82) Detroit, Michigan
- Party: Minnesota Democratic–Farmer–Labor Party
- Spouse: Tony Filipovitch
- Children: 3
- Education: College of Saint Teresa (B.A.); Duquesne University (M.A.)
- Occupation: Educator, youth advocate, legislator

Kathleen A. "Kathy" Brynaert (born July 15, 1944) is a Minnesota politician and former member of the Minnesota House of Representatives. A member of the Minnesota Democratic–Farmer–Labor Party (DFL), she represented District 19B, which includes Blue Earth County in south-central Minnesota. She is also a youth development leader and a former educator.

== Early life, education, and career ==
Brynaert attended high school in Detroit, Michigan, then went on to the College of St. Teresa in Winona, receiving her B.A. in philosophy. She later earned her M.A. in philosophy at Duquesne University in Pittsburgh, Pennsylvania. She is a former Franciscan Nun. She has worked as a homemaker, an office clerk, editor and surveyor for a planning firm, a playground and lunchroom supervisor for Independent School District 77, and director of parent education for the Council for Health Action and Promotion. From 1995-2006, she served as a member, vice chair and chair of the Mankato Area School Board. She was also an assembly delegate to the Minnesota School Board Association during this time.

Active in her local community, Brynaert is a former volunteer for the Mankato Food Cooperative, a former member of the Business Education Committee of the Mankato Chamber of Commerce, a former member and vice chair of the South Central Service Cooperative Board, and a member of the United Way Vision Council. She has long been an advocate for youth, serving as a member of the Educare Foundation, as Youth Service Committee chair for the Downtown Mankato Kiwanis, as a founding member and chair of Mankato Area Healthy Youth, and as chair of the 'How Are the Children?' Project. She was co-chair of the Envision 2020 Transportation Committee in 2006.

== Minnesota House of Representatives ==
Brynaert was first elected in 2006 and was re-elected in 2008, 2010, and 2012. She announced on March 23, 2014 that she would not seek re-election.
