= Marsha Swails =

American politician

Member of the Minnesota House of Representatives from the 56B district
- In office January 3, 2007 – January 3, 2011
- Preceded by: Karen Klinzing
- Succeeded by: Andrea Kieffer

Personal details
- Born: April 3, 1952 (age 74) Richmond, California
- Party: Democratic Farmer Labor Party
- Children: 2
- Education: Graceland University; Hamline University
- Profession: Teacher, legislator

Marsha Swails (born April 3, 1952) is an American politician and a former member of the Minnesota House of Representatives who represented District 56B, which includes the cities of Woodbury and Landfall in Washington County in the eastern Twin Cities metropolitan area. A Democrat, she was first elected in 2006 and re-elected in 2008. She was unseated by Republican Andrea Kieffer in her 2010 re-election bid.

Swails was a member of the House Ways & Means and K-12 Education Policy & Oversight committees, and of the Finance subcommittees for the K-12 Education Finance Division, the Transportation and Transit Policy and Oversight Division, and the Transportation Finance and Policy Division.

Swails is an Advanced Placement English Teacher at Woodbury Senior High School. She has received a number of awards, including the Woodbury Chamber of Commerce Teacher of the Year (2004), Sam's Club Teacher of the Year (2002, White Bear Lake store), and Minnesota Teacher of the Year Semi-Finalist (2001). She also served until 2007 as State Advisor for the Minnesota Association of Honor Societies.
