= Larry Hosch =

American politician

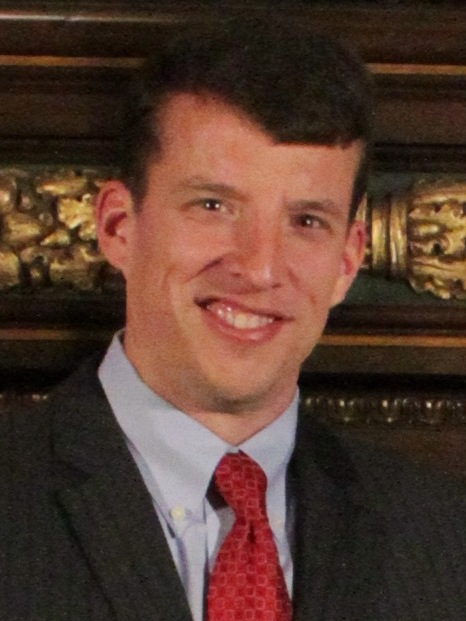

Member of the Minnesota House of Representatives from the 14B district
- In office 2005–2013
- Preceded by: Doug Stang
- Succeeded by: Jeff Howe (District 13A)

Personal details
- Born: October 16, 1977 (age 48) Fridley, Minnesota
- Party: Democratic-Farmer-Labor Party
- Spouse: Holly
- Children: 3
- Education: Saint John's University; Augsburg College
- Occupation: Business owner, legislator

Larry Hosch (born October 16, 1977) is a Minnesota politician and a former member of the Minnesota House of Representatives who represented District 14B, which includes portions of Stearns County in the central part of the state. A Democrat, he was first elected in 2004, and was re-elected in 2006, 2008 and 2010. He previously served as the mayor of Saint Joseph from 2001 to 2005. He retired from the House after the 2012 elections.

Hosch was a member of the House Commerce and Labor Committee, and also served on the Finance subcommittees for the Agriculture, Rural Economies and Veterans Affairs Finance Division, the Health Care and Human Services Finance Division, and the Public Safety Finance Division. He was an assistant majority leader. On November 16, 2010, incoming Minority Leader Paul Thissen announced that he will be one of four Minority Whips during the 2011-2012 legislative session.

Hosch has been the co-owner of Lamar Homes & Remodeling since 2003. He was previously a roofer with Granite City Roofing from 1998 to 2003, and Manager of Sal's Bar and Grill in St. Joseph from 1999 to 2001.
