= Denise Dittrich =

American politician (born 1957)

Member of the Minnesota House of Representatives from the 47A district
- In office 2005 – January 7, 2013
- Preceded by: Bill Haas
- Succeeded by: district redrawn

Personal details
- Born: August 6, 1957 (age 69) South Dakota
- Party: Minnesota Democratic-Farmer-Labor Party
- Spouse: Allen
- Children: 3
- Education: University of Minnesota, BS Elementary Education
- Profession: Educator, legislator

Denise R. Dittrich (pronounced DEE-trick) (born August 6, 1957) is a Minnesota politician and former member of the Minnesota House of Representatives from 2005 to 2012, representing District 47A, which included portions of the cities of Coon Rapids and Champlin in Anoka and Hennepin counties, which are part of the Twin Cities metropolitan area.

A Democrat, Dittrich was a member of the House's K-12 Education Policy and Oversight Committee and Taxes Committee, and also served on the Finance Subcommittee for the K-12 Education Finance Division and the Taxes Subcommittee for the Property and Local Sales Tax Division.

Dittrich unseated incumbent Bill Haas, a Republican, in the 2004 general election. Her margin of victory was 52%-48%. Her platform consisted primarily of increasing education funding and development of the Northstar Commuter Rail Line. On May 21, 2011, she joined the House Republican Majority in voting for a constitutional amendment to define marriage as between a man and woman.

In 2006, Dittrich defeated her Republican challenger, John Tomczak, 54%-46%. In 2008, she defeated her Republican challenger, Troy Buchholz, 59%-40%. In 2010, she defeated her Republican challenger, Cameron Roberson, 50.9% to 49%.

Representative Dittrich opposes same-sex marriage and in 2011 voted to amend the Minnesota Constitution to ban recognition and protection of same-gender families.
