= Michael Paymar =

American politician

Member of the Minnesota House of Representatives from the 64B district
- In office January 7, 1997 – January 5, 2015
- Preceded by: Howard Orenstein
- Succeeded by: Dave Pinto

Personal details
- Born: December 27, 1953 (age 72) Duluth, Minnesota
- Party: Minnesota Democratic–Farmer–Labor Party
- Domestic partner: Laura Goodman
- Children: 2
- Education: The College of St. Scholastica (B.A.); Hamline University (M.A.)
- Occupation: Resource specialist, legislator

Michael Paymar (born December 27, 1953) is a Minnesota politician and former member of the Minnesota House of Representatives. A member of the Minnesota Democratic–Farmer–Labor Party (DFL), he represented District 64B, which includes portions of the city of Saint Paul in Ramsey County, which is part of the Twin Cities metropolitan area. He is also a resource specialist for the Battered Women's Justice Project.

== Early life, education, and career ==
Paymar graduated from East High School in Duluth, then went on to the College of St. Scholastica, also in Duluth, graduating with a B.A. in education and history. He later attended Hamline University in Saint Paul, earning his M.P.A. He served on the Duluth City Council from 1980 to 1988, and was council president in 1984. During this time, he was a member of the Democratic Socialists of America. Later, after moving to Saint Paul, he served on the Saint Paul Charter Commission before being elected to the legislature.

== Minnesota House of Representatives ==
Paymar was first elected in 1996 and was reelected every two years thereafter until announcing on November 20, 2013, that he would not seek reelection in 2014. He was a member of the Committee on Law and Justice for the National Conference of State Legislatures and of the Public Safety and Justice Task Force for the Council of State Governments.
