= Mark Buesgens =

American politician (born 1961)

Member of the Minnesota House of Representatives from the 35B district
- In office January 5, 1999 – January 7, 2013
- Preceded by: Becky Kelso
- Succeeded by: district redrawn

Personal details
- Born: May 14, 1961 (age 65) Shakopee, Minnesota
- Party: Republican Party of Minnesota
- Spouse: Sara
- Children: 5
- Education: Minnesota State University, Mankato
- Profession: Educator, legislator

Mark William Buesgens (born May 14, 1961) is a Minnesota politician and former member of the Minnesota House of Representatives representing District 35B, which includes portions of Scott County in the southern Twin Cities metropolitan area. A Republican, he is an educator by profession, and is currently the business manager for the Saint Paul Conservatory for Performing Artists in Saint Paul.

== Service in the Minnesota House ==
Buesgens was first elected in 1998, and was re-elected every two years since then until retiring in 2012. He was a member of the House Finance Committee, on which he was the ranking minority party member, and the State and Local Government Operations Reform, Technology and Elections Committee. He also served on the Finance subcommittees for the Early Childhood Finance and Policy Division and the K-12 Education Finance Division, and on the State and Local Government Operations Reform, Technology and Elections Subcommittee for the Local Government Division. His legislative priorities included tax cuts, education reform, and local control of government decision-making. On May 21, 2011, he joined the House Republican Majority in voting for a constitutional amendment to define marriage as between a man and woman.
