= Joe Hoppe =

American politician

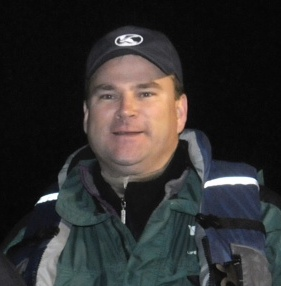

Member of the Minnesota House of Representatives from the 47B district 34B (2003–2013)
- In office January 7, 2003 – January 8, 2019
- Preceded by: Tom Workman (District 43A)
- Succeeded by: Greg Boe

Personal details
- Born: December 13, 1964 (age 61)
- Party: Republican Party of Minnesota
- Education: Saint John's University
- Occupation: businessman

Joseph R. Hoppe (born December 13, 1964) is an American politician and former member of the Minnesota House of Representatives. A member of the Republican Party of Minnesota, he represented District 47B, which included portions of Carver County in the southwestern part of the Twin Cities metropolitan area. Before becoming a politician, Hoppe worked as a local businessman and in communications.

== Education and early life ==
Hoppe graduated from Watertown High School in Watertown. Hoppe went on to Saint John's University in Collegeville, earning a BA in History.

== Minnesota House of Representatives ==
Hoppe was first elected to the Minnesota House of Representatives in 2002, and was re-elected every two years until retiring in 2018. He faced no opposition in 2010, 2012 and 2014. Hoppe is a member of the Minnesota Legislative Sportsmen's Caucus.

Since 2015, Hoppe has served as chair of the House Commerce & Regulatory Reform Committee. He previously served as the committee chair from 2011–12. Rep. Hoppe also serves as vice-chair of the Life Insurance & Financial Planning Committee in the National Council of Insurance Legislators.

In 2017, Rep. Hoppe authored legislation to provide emergency premium relief in response to the individual health insurance market crisis. The bill included historic reform of Minnesota's insurance laws to increase options and competition for individuals, farmers and small businesses, as well as protect consumers from surprise medical bills. It passed the Minnesota House with broad bipartisan support by a vote of 108–19 and was signed by Governor Mark Dayton.

Rep. Hoppe was the co-author of legislation to ensure women at risk of breast cancer have access to 3D mammograms through insurance, and has advocated for increased state support for mental health programming. He has opposed the state-run MNsure insurance website.

During his tenure as committee chair, Hoppe oversaw major efforts to modernize the state's alcohol laws in response to increasing consumer demand for Minnesota craft beer, spirits and wine.

== Personal life ==
Hoppe is married to Deanne, a public school administrator, and has two children. He is Catholic.

Hoppe is a long-time member of the Chaska Cubs board of directors, and is a past board member of the McCarthy Center for Public Policy and Civic Engagement at the College of Saint Benedict and Saint John's University.

He is a hunter and angler, and participated in the 2011 Governor's Fishing Opener with Minnesota House of Representatives Speaker Kurt Zellers and Governor Mark Dayton. He also attended the Governor's Pheasant Hunting Opener in 2011 and 2017.

In 2015, Governor Dayton attended Thanksgiving Dinner at the home of Rep. Hoppe.
