= 82nd Minnesota Legislature =

2001 to 2002 legislative session

Eighty-second Minnesota Legislature
←	81st Minnesota Legislature	83rd Minnesota Legislature	→
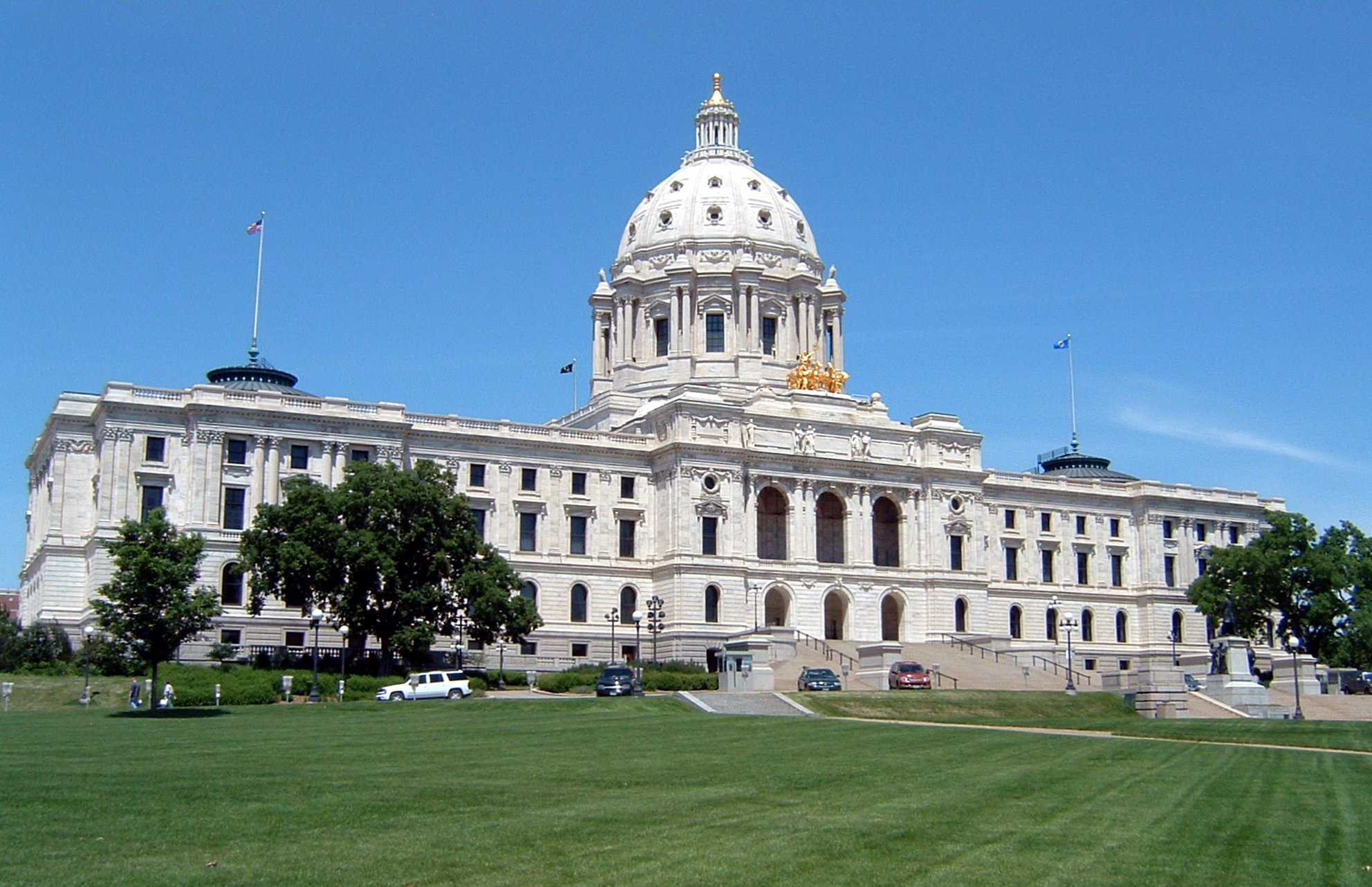

Overview
- Legislative body: Minnesota Legislature
- Jurisdiction: Minnesota, United States
- Meeting place: Minnesota State Capitol
- Term: January 3, 2001 – January 7, 2003
- Election: 2000 General Election
- Website: www.leg.state.mn.us

Minnesota State Senate
- Members: 67 Senators
- President: Don Samuelson
- Majority Leader: Roger Moe
- Minority Leader: Dick Day
- Party control: Democratic-Farmer-Labor Party

Minnesota House of Representatives
- Members: 134 Representatives
- Speaker: Steve Sviggum
- Majority Leader: Tim Pawlenty
- Minority Leader: Tom Pugh
- Party control: Republican Party

The eighty-second Minnesota Legislature first convened on January 3, 2001. The 67 members of the Minnesota Senate and the 134 members of the Minnesota House of Representatives were elected during the General Election on November 7, 2000.

== Sessions ==
The legislature met in a regular session from January 3, 2001 to May 21, 2001. A special session began on June 11, 2001 to consider taxes, the budget, and other bills not passed during the regular session.

A continuation of the regular session was held between January 29, 2002 and May 20, 2002. An additional special session was convened on September 19, 2002 to provide flood relief for Roseau and consider sales taxes and charitable deductions.

== Party summary ==
Resignations and new members are discussed in the "Membership changes" section, below.

=== Senate ===
	Party (Shading indicates majority caucus)				Total	Vacant
	DFL	IPM	Ind	Rep	Total	Vacant
End of previous Legislature	40	0	1	26	67	0
Begin	39	1 (Note: Elected as an Independent, Bob Lessard joined the Independence Party of Minnesota on January 3, 2001.)	0	27	67	0
December 28, 2001	38	1	0	27	66	1
January 2, 2002	37	1	0	27	65	2
February 4, 2002	39	1	0	27	67	0
July 9, 2002	39	2 (Note: Previously a Republican, Sheila Kiscaden joined the Independence Party of Minnesota on July 9, 2002.)	0	26	67	0
Latest voting share	58%	3%	0%	39%		
Beginning of the next Legislature	35	1	0	31	67	0

=== House of Representatives ===
	Party (Shading indicates majority caucus)			Total	Vacant
	DFL	Ind	Rep	Total	Vacant
End of previous Legislature	63	1	70	134	0
Begin	65	0	69	134	0
August 5, 2001	64	0	69	133	1
November 15, 2001	64	0	70	134	0
January 30, 2002	63	0	70	133	1
March 8, 2002	63	0	71	134	0
August 2, 2002	63	0	70	133	1
November 15, 2002	63	0	69	132	2
Latest voting share	48%	0%	52%		
Beginning of the next Legislature	52	0	81	133	1

== Leadership ==
=== Senate ===
President of the Senate
Don Samuelson (DFL-Brainerd)

Senate Majority Leader
Roger Moe (DFL-Erskine)

Senate Minority Leader
Dick Day (R-Owatonna)

=== House of Representatives ===
Speaker of the House
Steve Sviggum (R-Kenyon)

House Majority Leader
Tim Pawlenty (R-Eagen)

House Minority Leader
Tom Pugh (DFL-South St. Paul)

== Members ==
=== Senate ===
Name	District	City	Party
Anderson, Ellen	66	St. Paul	DFL
Bachmann, Michele	56	Stillwater	Rep
Belanger, William	41	Bloomington	Rep
Berg, Charlie	13	Chokio	Rep
Berglin, Linda	61	Minneapolis	DFL
Betzold, Don	48	Fridley	DFL
Chaudhary, Satveer	52	Fridley	DFL
Cohen, Dick	64	St. Paul	DFL
Day, Dick	28	Owatonna	Rep
Dille, Steve	20	Dassel	Rep
Fischbach, Michelle	14	Paynesville	Rep
Foley, Leo	49	Coon Rapids	DFL
Fowler, Chuck	26	Fairmont	DFL
Frederickson, Dennis	23	New Ulm	Rep
Higgins, Linda	58	Minneapolis	DFL
Hottinger, John	24	Mankato	DFL
Johnson, Dave	40	Bloomington	DFL
Johnson, Dean	15	Willmar	DFL
Johnson, Debbie	50	Ham Lake	Rep
Johnson, Doug	06	Tower	DFL
Kelley, Steve	44	Hopkins	DFL
Kelly, Randy	67	St. Paul	DFL
Kierlin, Bob	32	Winona	Rep
Kinkel, Tony	04	Park Rapids	DFL
Kiscaden, Sheila	30	Rochester	IPM
Kleis, Dave	16	St. Cloud	Rep
Knutson, David	36	Burnsville	Rep
Krentz, Jane	51	May Township	DFL
Langseth, Keith	09	Glyndon	DFL
Larson, Cal	10	Fergus Falls	Rep
Lesewski, Arlene	21	Marshall	Rep
Lessard, Bob	03	International Falls	IPM
Limmer, Warren	33	Maple Grove	Rep
Lourey, Becky	08	Kerrick	DFL
Marty, John	54	Roseville	DFL
Metzen, James	39	South St. Paul	DFL
Moe, Roger	02	Erskine	DFL
Moua, Mee	67	St. Paul	DFL
Murphy, Steve	29	Red Wing	DFL
Neuville, Thomas	25	Northfield	Rep
Oliver, Edward	43	Deephaven	Rep
Olson, Gen	34	Minnetrista	Rep
Orfield, Myron	60	Minneapolis	DFL
Ourada, Mark	19	Buffalo	Rep
Pappas, Sandra	65	St. Paul	DFL
Pariseau, Pat	37	Farmington	Rep
Pogemiller, Larry	59	Minneapolis	DFL
Price, Leonard	57	Woodbury	DFL
Ranum, Jane	63	Minneapolis	DFL
Reiter, Mady	53	Shoreview	Rep
Rest, Ann	46	New Hope	DFL
Ring, Twyla	18	North Branch	DFL
Robertson, Martha	45	Minnetonka	Rep
Robling, Claire	35	Prior Lake	Rep
Sabo, Julie	62	Minneapolis	DFL
Sams, Dallas	11	Staples	DFL
Samuelson, Don	12	Brainerd	DFL
Scheevel, Kenric	31	Preston	Rep
Scheid, Linda	47	Brooklyn Park	DFL
Schwab, Grace	27	Albert Lea	Rep
Solon, Sam	07	Duluth	DFL
Solon, Yvonne Prettner	07	Duluth	DFL
Stevens, Dan	17	Mora	Rep
Stumpf, LeRoy	01	Thief River Falls	DFL
Terwilliger, Roy	42	Edina	Rep
Tomassoni, David	05	Chisholm	DFL
Vickerman, Jim	22	Tracy	DFL
Wiener, Deanna	38	Eagan	DFL
Wiger, Chuck	55	North St. Paul	DFL

=== House of Representatives ===
Name	District	City	Party
Abeler, Jim	49A	Anoka	Rep
Abrams, Ron	45A	Minnetonka	Rep
Anderson, Bruce	19B	Buffalo	Rep
Anderson, Irv	03A	International Falls	DFL
Bakk, Tom	06A	Cook	DFL
Bernardy, Connie	48B	Fridley	DFL
Biernat, Len	59A	Minneapolis	DFL
Bishop, Dave	30B	Rochester	Rep
Blaine, Greg	12B	Little Falls	Rep
Boudreau, Lynda	25B	Faribault	Rep
Bradley, Fran	30A	Rochester	Rep
Buesgens, Mark	35B	Jordan	Rep
Carlson, Lyndon	46B	Crystal	DFL
Cassell, George	10B	Alexandria	Rep
Clark, James	23A	New Ulm	Rep
Clark, Karen	61A	Minneapolis	DFL
Daggett, Roxann	11A	Frazee	Rep
Davids, Gregory	31B	Preston	Rep
Davnie, Jim	62A	Minneapolis	DFL
Dawkins, Andy	65A	St. Paul	DFL
Dehler, Steve	14A	St. Joseph	Rep
Dempsey, Jerry	29A	Red Wing	Rep
Dibble, Scott	60B	Minneapolis	DFL
Dorman, Dan	27A	Albert Lea	Rep
Dorn, John	24A	Mankato	DFL
Eastlund, Rob	18A	Isanti	Rep
Entenza, Matt	64A	St. Paul	DFL
Erhardt, Ron	42A	Edina	Rep
Erickson, Sondra	17A	Princeton	Rep
Evans, Geri	52B	New Brighton	DFL
Finseth, Tim	01B	Angus	Rep
Folliard, Betty	44A	Hopkins	DFL
Fuller, Doug	04A	Bemidji	Rep
Gerlach, Chris	36A	Apple Valley	Rep
Gleason, Mark	63B	Richfield	DFL
Goodno, Kevin	09A	Moorhead	Rep
Goodwin, Barbara	52A	Columbia Heights	DFL
Gray, Gregory	58B	Minneapolis	DFL
Greiling, Mindy	54B	Roseville	DFL
Gunther, Bob	26A	Fairmont	Rep
Haas, Bill	48A	Champlin	Rep
Hackbarth, Tom	50A	Cedar	Rep
Harder, Elaine	22B	Jackson	Rep
Hausman, Alice	66B	St. Paul	DFL
Hilstrom, Debra	47B	Brooklyn Center	DFL
Hilty, Bill	08B	Finlayson	DFL
Holberg, Mary Liz	37B	Lakeville	Rep
Holsten, Mark	56A	Stillwater	Rep
Howes, Larry	04B	Walker	Rep
Huntley, Thomas	06B	Duluth	DFL
Jacobson, Carl	53B	Vadnais Heights	Rep
Jaros, Mike	07B	Duluth	DFL
Jennings, Loren Geo	18B	Rush City	DFL
Johnson, Jeff	34B	Plymouth	Rep
Johnson, Ruth	24B	St. Peter	DFL
Johnson, Sheldon	67B	St. Paul	DFL
Jordan, John	47A	Brooklyn Park	Rep
Juhnke, Al	15A	Willmar	DFL
Kahn, Phyllis	59B	Minneapolis	DFL
Kalis, Henry	26B	Wells	DFL
Kelliher, Margaret Anderson	60A	Minneapolis	DFL
Kielkucki, Tony	20B	Winsted	Rep
Knoblach, Jim	16B	St. Cloud	Rep
Koskinen, Luanne	49B	Coon Rapids	DFL
Krinkie, Philip	53A	Shoreview	Rep
Kubly, Gary	15B	Granite Falls	DFL
Kuisle, Bill	31A	Rochester	Rep
Larson, Dan	40A	Bloomington	DFL
Leighton, Rob	27B	Austin	DFL
Lenczewski, Ann	40B	Bloomington	DFL
Leppik, Peggy	45B	Golden Valley	Rep
Lieder, Bernard	02A	Crookston	DFL
Lindner, Arlon	33A	Corcoran	Rep
Lipman, Eric	56B	Lake Elmo	Rep
Luther, Darlene	47A	Brooklyn Park	DFL
Mahoney, Tim	67A	St. Paul	DFL
Mares, Harry	55A	White Bear Lake	Rep
Mariani, Carlos	65B	St. Paul	DFL
Marko, Sharon	57B	Cottage Grove	DFL
Marquart, Paul	09B	Dilworth	DFL
McElroy, Dan	36B	Burnsville	Rep
McGuire, Mary Jo	54A	Falcon Heights	DFL
Milbert, Bob	39B	South St. Paul	DFL
Molnau, Carol	35A	Chaska	Rep
Mulder, Richard	21B	Ivanhoe	Rep
Mullery, Joe	58A	Minneapolis	DFL
Murphy, Mary	08A	Hermantown	DFL
Ness, Bob	20A	Dassel	Rep
Nornes, Bud	10A	Fergus Falls	Rep
Olson, Mark	19A	Big Lake	Rep
Opatz, Joe	16A	St. Cloud	DFL
Osskopp, Mike	29B	Lake City	Rep
Osthoff, Tom	66A	St. Paul	DFL
Otremba, Mary Ellen	11B	Long Prairie	DFL
Ozment, Dennis	37A	Rosemount	Rep
Paulsen, Erik	42B	Eden Prairie	Rep
Pawlenty, Tim	38B	Eagan	Rep
Paymar, Michael	64B	St. Paul	DFL
Pelowski, Gene	32A	Winona	DFL
Penas, Maxine	01A	Badger	Rep
Petersen, Doug	13B	Madison	DFL
Pugh, Tom	39A	South St. Paul	DFL
Rhodes, Jim	44B	St. Louis Park	Rep
Rifenberg, Michelle	32B	La Crescent	Rep
Rukavina, Tom	05A	Virginia	DFL
Ruth, Connie	28A	Owatonna	Rep
Schumacher, Leslie	17B	Princeton	DFL
Seagren, Alice	41A	Bloomington	Rep
Seifert, Marty	21A	Marshall	Rep
Sertich, Tony	05B	Chisholm	DFL
Skoe, Rod	02B	Clearbrook	DFL
Skoglund, Wes	62B	Minneapolis	DFL
Slawik, Nora	57A	Maplewood	DFL
Smith, Steve	34A	Mound	Rep
Solberg, Loren	03B	Bovey	DFL
Stanek, Rich	33B	Maple Grove	Rep
Stang, Doug	14B	Cold Spring	Rep
Sviggum, Steve	28B	Kenyon	Rep
Swapinski, Dale	07A	Duluth	DFL
Swenson, Howard	23B	Nicollet	Rep
Sykora, Barb	43B	Excelsior	Rep
Thompson, Mark	46A	New Hope	DFL
Tingelstad, Kathy	50B	Andover	Rep
Tuma, John	25A	Northfield	Rep
Vandeveer, Ray	51B	Forest Lake	Rep
Wagenius, Jean	63A	Minneapolis	DFL
Walker, Neva	61B	Minneapolis	DFL
Walz, Dale	12A	Brainerd	Rep
Wasiluk, Scott	55B	Maplewood	DFL
Wenzel, Steve	12B	Little Falls	DFL
Westerberg, Andy	51A	Blaine	Rep
Westrom, Torrey	13A	Elbow Lake	Rep
Wilkin, Tim	38A	Eagan	Rep
Winter, Ted	22A	Fulda	DFL
Wolf, Ken	41B	Burnsville	Rep
Workman, Tom	43A	Chanhassen	Rep

== Membership changes ==
=== Senate ===
District	Vacated by	Reason for change	Successor	Date successor seated
07	Sam Solon (DFL)	Died of melanoma / liver cancer on December 28, 2001. His wife, Yvonne Prettner Solon, was thereafter elected to succeed him at special election.	Yvonne Prettner; Solon (DFL)	February 4, 2002
67	Randy Kelly (DFL)	Resigned January 2, 2002 to become Mayor of St. Paul.	Mee Moua (DFL)	February 4, 2002

=== House of Representatives ===
District	Vacated by	Reason for change	Successor	Date successor seated
12B	Steve Wenzel (DFL)	Resigned August 5, 2001 to become state director of rural development for the United States Department of Agriculture.	Greg Blaine (R)	November 15, 2001
47A	Darlene Luther (DFL)	Died of stomach cancer on January 30, 2002.	John Jordan (R)	March 8, 2002
23A	James Clark (R)	Resigned August 2, 2002, citing familial concerns in his letter of resignation.	Remained vacant	
40A	Dan McElroy (R)	Resigned November 15, 2002, to accept appointment as Commissioner of Finance under the incoming Pawlenty administration.	Remained vacant	

== Notes ==
Preceded by Eighty-first Minnesota Legislature	Eighty-second Minnesota Legislature; 2001—2003	Succeeded by Eighty-third Minnesota Legislature
