= Senator Fowler =

Senator Fowler may refer to:

== Members of the United States Senate ==
- Joseph S. Fowler (1820–1902), U.S. Senator from Tennessee from 1866 to 1871
- Wyche Fowler (born 1940), U.S. Senator from Georgia from 1987 to 1993

== United States state senate members ==
- Bernie Fowler (born 1924), Maryland State Senate
- Chuck Fowler (born 1939), Minnesota State Senate
- Dale Fowler (fl. 2010s–2020s), Illinois State Senate
- David Fowler (politician) (born 1958), Tennessee State Senate
- H. Robert Fowler (1851–1926), Illinois State Senate
- J. Samuel Fowler (1873–1961), New York State Senate
- James Fowler (Massachusetts politician) (1788–1873), Massachusetts State Senate
- Orin Fowler (1791–1852), Massachusetts State Senate
- Steve Fowler (born 1950), Nebraska State Senate
- William Chauncey Fowler (1793–1881), Connecticut State Senate

== See also ==
- Fowler (surname)
