= Senator Ten Eyck =

Senator Ten Eyck may refer to:

- John C. Ten Eyck (1814–1879), U.S. Senator from New Jersey
- Conrad Ten Eyck (1782–1847), Michigan State Senate
- David Ten Eyck (born 1953), Minnesota State Senate
