= Donald Ziegler =

Donald Ziegler may refer to:

- Donald Emil Ziegler (1936–2019), American judge in Pennsylvania
- Donald N. Ziegler (born 1949), American politician in Minnesota
