= Senator Ring =

Senator Ring may refer to:

- Jeremy Ring (born 1970), Florida State Senate
- Merritt Clarke Ring (1850–1915), Wisconsin State Senate
- Twyla Ring (born 1937), Minnesota State Senate
