= McElfatrick =

McElfatrick is a surname of Gaelic origin. Notable people with the surname include:

- Carolyn McElfatrick (b. 1944), American politician.
- Dave McElfatrick (b. 1984), Northern Irish cartoonist known from Cyanide & Happiness.
- William H. McElfatrick (1854–1922), American architect.
