= Elizabeth Kautz =

American politician

Mayor Elizabeth Kautz
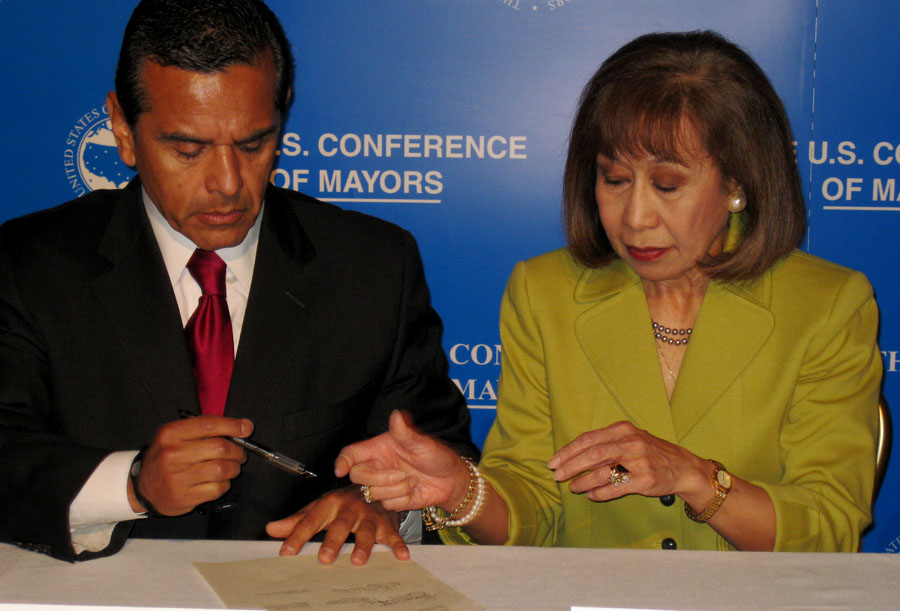
- Kautz with Antonio Villaraigosa at the 2010 United States Conference of Mayors

Mayor of Burnsville, Minnesota
- Incumbent
- Assumed office 1995
- Preceded by: Dan McElroy

68th President of the United States Conference of Mayors
- In office 2009–2011
- Preceded by: Greg Nickels
- Succeeded by: Antonio Villaraigosa

Burnsville City Councilwoman
- In office 1992–1994

Personal details
- Party: Republican
- Education: St Catherine University; Adler University

Elizabeth Kautz is an American politician currently serving as mayor of Burnsville, Minnesota since 1995. A Republican, she has been re-elected to her office eight times.

== Career ==
=== Burnsville City Council ===
Before being elected mayor, Kautz served as a councilwoman on the Burnsville City Council from 1992 to 1994.

=== Mayor of Burnsville ===
Kautz was first appointed mayor in 1995 to serve the remainder of Ken Wolf's term following his election to the Minnesota House of Representatives. She is currently serving on her eight term with her most recent election being in 2020 where she won re-election with 63.6% of the vote. As Mayor she has focused on community development, quality of life and financial management green-lighting renovation campaigns to turn unproductive parts of the city into its financial backbone, allowing more money to be spent on public transportation and retrofitting all municipal buildings with LED lights. She has also financed a new $20 million Performing Arts Center in the city's downtown, initially receiving public backlash for using taxpayer dollars, but successfully turning the Center into a pillar of the community. She has also participated in national politics, being a strong supporter of Donald Trump and his presidency, being one of the first politicians to travel to Trump Tower directly following the 2016 United States presidential election to congratulate him in person.

=== United States Conference of Mayors ===
Mayor Kautz was selected to serve as the 68th President of the United States Conference of Mayors. She was appointed to finish the remainder of Seattle mayor Greg Nickels 2009 to 2010 term as his re-election bid was defeated shortly after being named the Conference's President in 2009. She also held her own tenure from 2010 to 2011. During her term she focused the conference's efforts on immigration issues. Namely creating a universal and concise definition of a sanctuary city and streamlining how local law enforcement interacts with ICE and the DHS. Following the expiring of her term, she has also worked as the conference's Chair of the Finance and Audit Committee.

== Personal life ==
Kautz is single.
