= Folliard =

Folliard is a surname. Notable people with the surname include:

- Betty Folliard (born 1951), American politician
- Edward T. Folliard (1899–1976), American journalist

== See also ==
- Tom O'Folliard (1858–1880), American outlaw
