= Senator Ziegler =

Senator Ziegler may refer to:

- Bob Ziegler (1921–1991), Alaska State Senate
- Donald N. Ziegler (born 1949), Minnesota State Senate
- Hal Ziegler (1932–2012), Michigan State Senate
