= Seagren =

Seagren is a surname of Swedish origin. Notable people with the surname include:

- Alice Seagren (born 1947), American politician
- Bob Seagren (born 1946), American pole vaulter
- Danny Seagren (1943–2025), American puppeteer and actor
