= Rick Hansen (politician) =

American politician of Minnesota

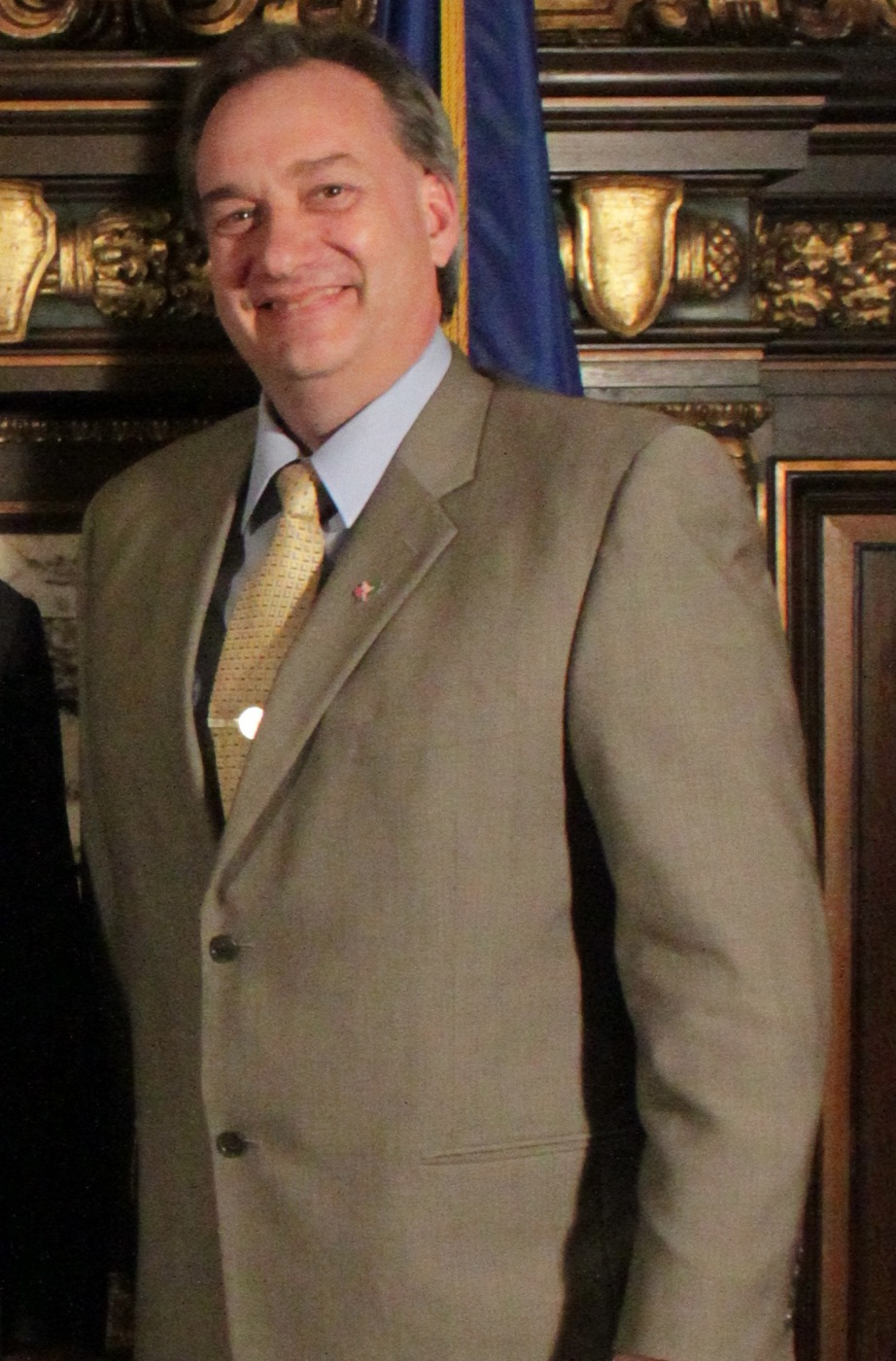

Member of the Minnesota House of Representatives from the 53B district
- Incumbent
- Assumed office January 4, 2005
- Preceded by: Tom Pugh

Personal details
- Born: March 1, 1963 (age 63) Albert Lea, Minnesota
- Party: Democratic (DFL)
- Spouse: Suzanne
- Children: 1
- Education: Upper Iowa University (B.S.); Iowa State University (M.S.)
- Occupation: Businessman; Legislator
- Website: Government website Campaign website

Rick Hansen (born March 1, 1963) is an American politician serving in the Minnesota House of Representatives since 2005. A member of the Minnesota Democratic-Farmer-Labor Party (DFL), Hansen represents District 53B in the southeastern Twin Cities metropolitan area, which includes the cities of Newport, South St. Paul, Inver Grove Heights, Cottage Grove, and St. Paul Park, and parts of Dakota and Washington Counties.

== Early life, education, and career ==
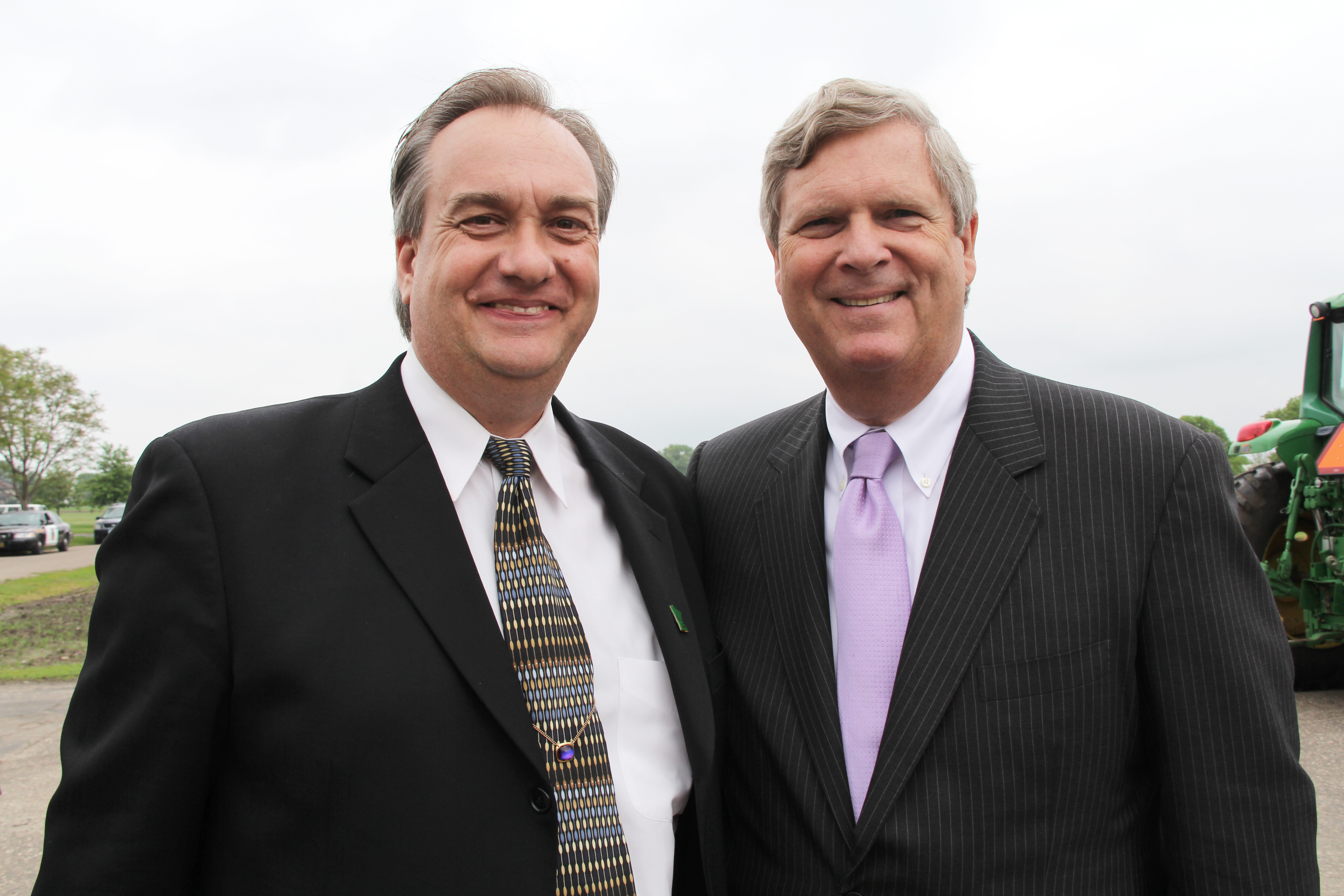
Rick Hansen and Tom Vilsack stand together at the launching of the Minnesota Agricultural Water Quality Certification program

Hansen was raised on a farm in rural Minnesota. He graduated magna cum laude from Upper Iowa University in Fayette, with a Bachelor of Science degree in biology, and later earned a MS degree in soil management from Iowa State University in Ames.

Hansen worked at the Minnesota Department of Agriculture from 1998 to 2005. He served on the Dakota County Soil and Water Conservation District Board of Managers from 1996 until he was elected to the state legislature. He works for Harmony Cedar, Inc., a company that sells handcrafted Amish furniture and owns a farm in southeast Minnesota.

== Minnesota House of Representatives ==
Hansen was elected to the Minnesota House of Representatives in 2004 and has been reelected every two years since. He first ran after seven-term incumbent Tom Pugh resigned to accept an appointment to the Minnesota Public Utilities Commission. In 2020, Hansen had his election results challenged, but a judge dismissed the case for failing to state a claim and lack of subject-matter jurisdiction.

After U.S. Representative John Kline announced his retirement in 2015, Hansen briefly considered running for the Minnesota's 2nd Congressional District. He supported fellow state representative Erin Murphy in the 2018 DFL primary, and endorsed Pete Buttigieg in the 2020 Democratic Party presidential primary.

Hansen has chaired the Environment and Natural Resources Finance and Policy Committee since 2021. He also sits on the Agriculture Finance and Policy, Capital Investment, and State and Local Government Finance and Policy Committees. From 2007 to 2008, Hansen chaired the Watersheds, Wetlands and Buffers Division and he served as an assistant majority leader from 2011 to 2012. From 2018 to 2019 he chaired of the Environment and Natural Resources Finance Committee.

Hansen has served on the Minnesota Lessard Outdoor Heritage Council, the Minnesota Citizen-Commission on Natural Resources, the Legislative Audit Commission, and the House Select Committee on Technology and Responsive Government.

=== Environment and Natural Resources ===
Hansen has been a longtime advocate of more stringent environmental protections and critical of corporate special interests. He has been described as "one to challenge powerful special interests" and "a leader on environmental issues". In 2017, Hansen removed his name from that year's environment bill, calling it a giveaway to narrow interests. Hansen criticized Senate Republicans for "hostage taking" over clean car emission standards and called out Senate Environment committee chair Bill Ingebrigtsen for visiting Alaska during the 2021 legislative session. Hansen has supported Governor Tim Walz's efforts to use his rule-making authority to adopt stricter car emission standards.

Hansen has pushed for increasing state funding to deal with invasive species such as emerald ash borer, and restoration programs for wildlife habitats and wetlands. In 2019, he voted to support a ban on wolf hunting in the state, advising members to "vote their districts" due to inter-party conflict over the vote. Hansen authored legislation requiring carpet manufacturers to create recycling programs to cut down on landfill waste. He supported efforts to replant drought-killed trees as part of a 2022 deal on farm relief.

==== Pollinators and pesticide regulation ====
Hansen supports increased research into sources of pollinator decline, especially due to neonicotinoid chemical pesticides and their use in the agricultural industry. In 2019, Hansen authored a bill that designated the native rusty patched bumblebee as Minnesota's state bee, providing it with endangered species protections. He has called for banning neonics on state lands, the creation of pollinator-safe zones, and alternatives to pesticide-treated seeds. He authored legislation that would give Minnesota's four largest cities the ability to enforce rules on the use of pesticides within city limits and ban the use of certain pesticides. He carried a bill that would allow residents to have native landscapes to promote pollinator habitats and biodiversity. Hansen supported the Minnesota Department of Agriculture's decision to ban chlorpyrifos pesticides in 2021 after it was found to pose risks to children and fetuses.

==== Chronic wasting disease ====
Hansen, a hunter, has sponsored legislation to deal with the spread of chronic wasting disease in Minnesota's wild and farmed deer populations. He has supported efforts to increase testing of live and deceased deer. He has been critical of Minnesota's Board of Animal Health, saying it was failing in its oversight of the state's deer farms, calling for a legislative audit, and accusing it of regulatory capture. He has supported efforts for stronger fencing requirements, declaring a moratorium on new state deer farms, and banning the movement of farmed deer.

==== Water quality and pollution ====
Hansen has said that corporations who pollute water sources should pay to clean up water sources, and criticized Minnesota-based company 3M for settling a lawsuit over contaminated drinking water in the east Twin Cities metropolitan area. Hansen supported Governor Mark Dayton's efforts to establish buffer strips between farmland and waterways to protect from agricultural runoff. He has authored legislation to study the impact of microplastics on water quality and human health. He also supports making manufacturers pay to clean-up landfill contamination caused by their use PFAS chemicals. Hansen, a member of the Legislative-Citizen Commission on Minnesota Resources, has opposed efforts by Republicans to use that funding to include local wastewater treatment projects. He has drafted legislation to clean up Saint Paul's Pig's Eye Regional Park of harmful contaminants due to a nearby landfill, and supported using solar panels and wind turbines at wastewater treatment plants.

==== Mining ====
Hansen called for an audit of the Minnesota Pollution Control Agency's handling of PolyMet mining and water quality permits, and expressed concern about the Enbridge Line 3 pipeline, citing young voters' environmental concerns in his district. He argued that mines should pay additional taxes to pay for local government infrastructure costs and environmental reviews.

=== Other political positions ===
Hansen voted against proposing the 2012 Minnesota constitutional amendment, which would have prohibited same-sex marriage in the state, and voted in 2013 to codify same-sex marriage. In 2015, he voted against allowing liquor stores to be open on Sundays. He was one of five representatives to vote against moving the state's primary election from September to August 10, saying it would extend the campaign season and increase the cost of elections. He sponsored legislation to commission a bust of U.S. Senator Paul Wellstone to be displayed at the state Capitol.

Hansen has supported grants included in the 2020 Tax Bill to help meat processing plants in his district of South St. Paul relocate and grow. Hansen advocated for the cost of federally-required REAL ID licenses to be covered by the state, rather than individual fees on drivers. He introduced legislation to increase funding to Minnesota's Licensing and Registration System (MNLARS) in 2018 after months-long delays. He supported efforts to divest Minnesota from any investments into Russia after the 2022 invasion of Ukraine.

== Electoral history ==
2004 Minnesota State House - District 39A
| Party | Candidate | Votes | % |
|---|---|---|---|
| Democratic (DFL) | Rick Hansen | 11,644 | 55.30 |
| Republican | Paul Ives | 9,398 | 44.63 |
| Write-in | | 14 | 0.07 |
| Total votes | | 21,056 | 100.0 |
| Democratic (DFL) hold | | | |

2006 Minnesota State House - District 39A
| Party | Candidate | Votes | % |
|---|---|---|---|
| Democratic (DFL) | Rick Hansen (incumbent) | 11,211 | 64.87 |
| Republican | Tom Marver | 6,045 | 34.98 |
| Write-in | | 25 | 0.14 |
| Total votes | | 17,281 | 100.0 |
| Democratic (DFL) hold | | | |

2008 Minnesota State House - District 39A
| Party | Candidate | Votes | % |
|---|---|---|---|
| Democratic (DFL) | Rick Hansen (incumbent) | 12,798 | 60.35 |
| Republican | Bill Jungbauer | 8,373 | 39.49 |
| Write-in | | 34 | 0.16 |
| Total votes | | 21,205 | 100.0 |
| Democratic (DFL) hold | | | |

2010 Minnesota State House - District 39A
| Party | Candidate | Votes | % |
|---|---|---|---|
| Democratic (DFL) | Rick Hansen (incumbent) | 9,512 | 58.34 |
| Republican | Don Lee | 6,777 | 41.57 |
| Write-in | | 15 | 0.09 |
| Total votes | | 16,304 | 100.0 |
| Democratic (DFL) hold | | | |

2012 Minnesota State House - District 52A
| Party | Candidate | Votes | % |
|---|---|---|---|
| Democratic (DFL) | Rick Hansen (incumbent) | 13,732 | 62.45 |
| Republican | Joe Blum | 8,216 | 37.36 |
| Write-in | | 41 | 0.19 |
| Total votes | | 21,989 | 100.0 |
| Democratic (DFL) hold | | | |

2014 Minnesota State House - District 52A
| Party | Candidate | Votes | % |
|---|---|---|---|
| Democratic (DFL) | Rick Hansen (incumbent) | 9,777 | 59.38 |
| Republican | Joe Blum | 6,661 | 40.46 |
| Write-in | | 26 | 0.16 |
| Total votes | | 16,464 | 100.0 |
| Democratic (DFL) hold | | | |

2016 Minnesota State House - District 52A
| Party | Candidate | Votes | % |
|---|---|---|---|
| Democratic (DFL) | Rick Hansen (incumbent) | 13,737 | 63.33 |
| Republican | Larry Sachi | 7,929 | 36.55 |
| Write-in | | 25 | 0.12 |
| Total votes | | 21,691 | 100.0 |
| Democratic (DFL) hold | | | |

2018 Minnesota State House - District 52A
| Party | Candidate | Votes | % |
|---|---|---|---|
| Democratic (DFL) | Rick Hansen (incumbent) | 13,549 | 65.84 |
| Republican | Beth L. Arnston | 6,998 | 34.01 |
| Write-in | | 32 | 0.16 |
| Total votes | | 20,599 | 100.0 |
| Democratic (DFL) hold | | | |

2020 Minnesota State House - District 52A
| Party | Candidate | Votes | % |
|---|---|---|---|
| Democratic (DFL) | Rick Hansen (incumbent) | 15,704 | 65.84 |
| Republican | Mariah de la Paz | 8,243 | 34.36 |
| Write-in | | 40 | 0.17 |
| Total votes | | 23,987 | 100.0 |
| Democratic (DFL) hold | | | |

2022 Minnesota State House - District 53B
| Party | Candidate | Votes | % |
|---|---|---|---|
| Democratic (DFL) | Rick Hansen (incumbent) | 9,290 | 54.36 |
| Republican | Steven Swoboda | 6,713 | 39.28 |
| Legal Marijuana Now | Laura E. Pride | 1,074 | 6.28 |
| Write-in | | 14 | 0.08 |
| Total votes | | 17,091 | 100.0 |
| Democratic (DFL) hold | | | |

2024 Minnesota State House - District 53B
| Party | Candidate | Votes | % |
|---|---|---|---|
| Democratic (DFL) | Rick Hansen (incumbent) | 13,203 | 59.37 |
| Republican | Aaron M. Brooksby | 9,002 | 40.48 |
| Write-in | | 33 | 0.15 |
| Total votes | | 22,238 | 100.00 |
| Democratic (DFL) hold | | | |

== Personal life ==
Hansen lives in South Saint Paul, Minnesota, with his spouse, Suzanne, and has one child.
