= Fastenal =

American industrial supply company

Fastenal Company

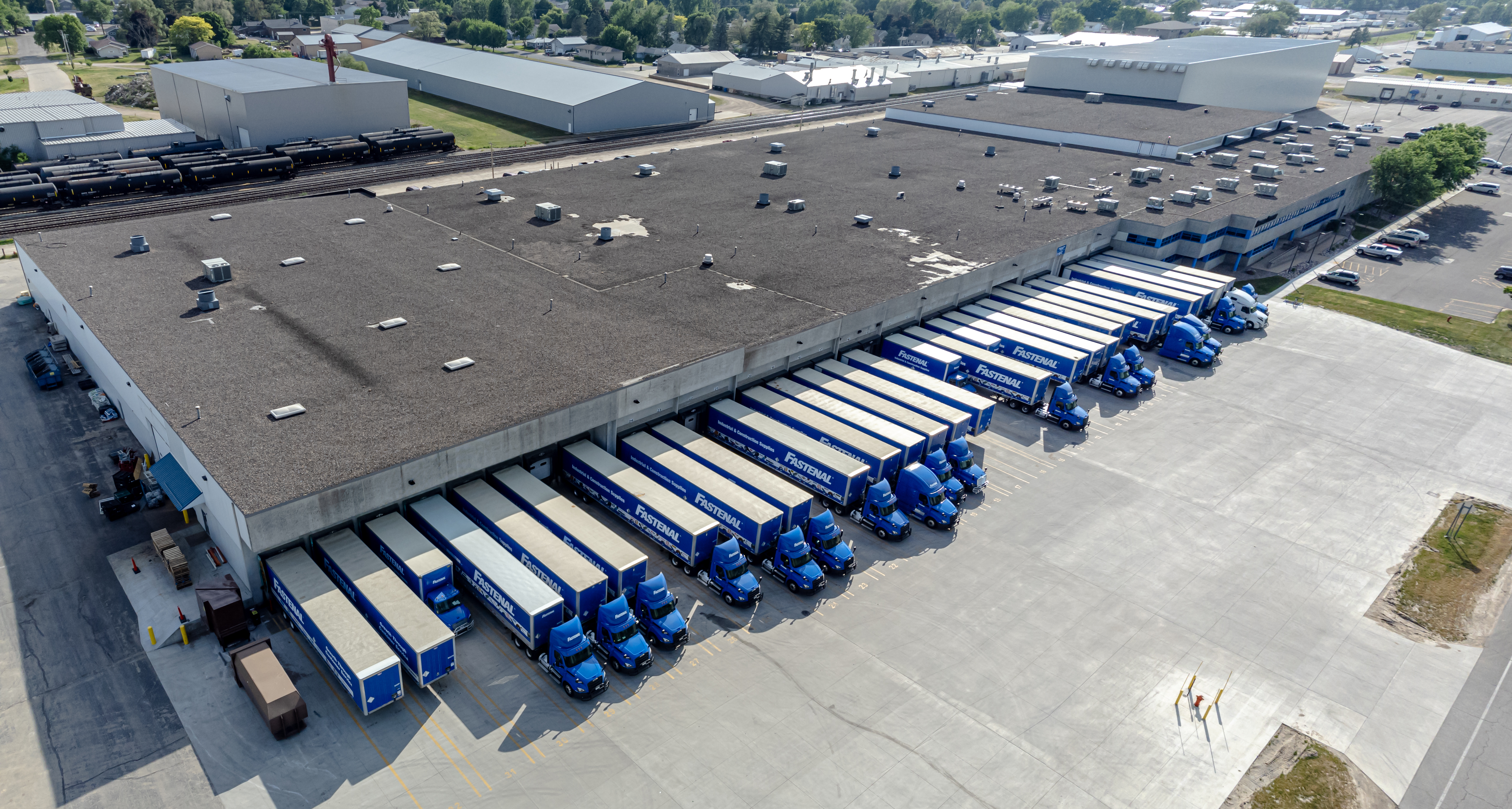
- Type: Public
- Traded as: Nasdaq: FAST; Nasdaq-100 component; S&P 500 component
- Founded: 1967; 59 years ago
- Founder: Bob Kierlin
- Headquarters: Winona, Minnesota, U.S.
- Number of locations: 1,595 (2025)
- Area served: United States; Canada; Europe; Asia
- Key people: Daniel L. Florness (CEO); Max Tunnicliff (CFO)
- Revenue: ▲US$8.2 billion (2025)
- Operating income: ▲US$1.7 billion (2025)
- Net income: ▲US$1.3 billion (2025)
- Total assets: ▲US$5.1 billion (2025)
- Total equity: ▲US$3.9 billion (2025)
- Number of employees: 24,489 (2025)
- Website: fastenal.com

Fastenal Company is an American publicly traded company based in Winona, Minnesota, founded in 1967. Fastenal is a major distributor of industrial and construction supplies, and the largest fastener distributor in North America. Fastenal provides supply chain solutions including bin stock, vending machines, inventory management, and logistics services. Fastenal placed 479 in the 2021 Fortune 500 based on its 2020 revenues, and its stock is a component of the Nasdaq 100 and S&P 500 stock market indices. Fastenal had 3,334 in-market locations as of March 2023.

== History ==
Founded in 1967 by Bob Kierlin, the company was incorporated on December 24, 1968. Fastenal's offerings include both purchased and manufactured products.

In January 2016, Daniel L. Florness became the president and CEO of Fastenal. Florness started with Fastenal in 1996 as the company's chief financial officer. In 2025, Fastenal announced President and CSO Jeff Watts would succeed Florness in July 2026.

On July 16, 2026, Jeffery M. Watts succeeded Daniel L. Florness as Chief Executive Officer of Fastenal, marking the conclusion of an orderly leadership transition process initiated in August 2024. Under the new leadership, the company has emphasized a continued strategic commitment to integrating artificial intelligence and advanced inventory management technologies to drive supply chain efficiency. Concurrently, the company has expanded its environmental, social, and governance (ESG) reporting; in its 2026 Impact Report, Fastenal announced the attainment of limited assurance over its 2025 Scope 1 and 2 greenhouse gas emissions and the achievement of zero-waste certification at its Wallingford, Connecticut, manufacturing facility.

Fastenal has been a sponsor of NASCAR since 2006, and in 2020, they became the official MRO partner of the NHL.

In 2009, Fastenal acquired parts of Holo-Krome, a socket head screw-making company. Fastenal then was added to the S&P 500 index in late 2008.

=== Canada ===
Fastenal entered the Canadian market in 1994. The company has branch locations in every province and two Canadian distribution centers.

=== Mexico ===
In 1999, Fastenal entered the market in Mexico. Fastenal has branches in 14 of Mexico's states as well as a distribution center.

=== Asia ===
Fastenal's Asian trading company, Fastenal Asian Sourcing and Trading Co, is a Wholly Foreign-Owned Enterprise located in Shanghai, China, where it directs sourcing and import purchasing activities. Opened in 2001, Fastenal's Singapore location was its first site outside North America. By 2009, sales operations in Shanghai were complemented by those in its larger neighbor Malaysia. Locally incorporated Fastenal Malaysia Sdn Bhd is associated with Fastenal's Malaysian activities. The company runs an A2LA accredited testing laboratory in this nation as of 2014.

== Products and services ==
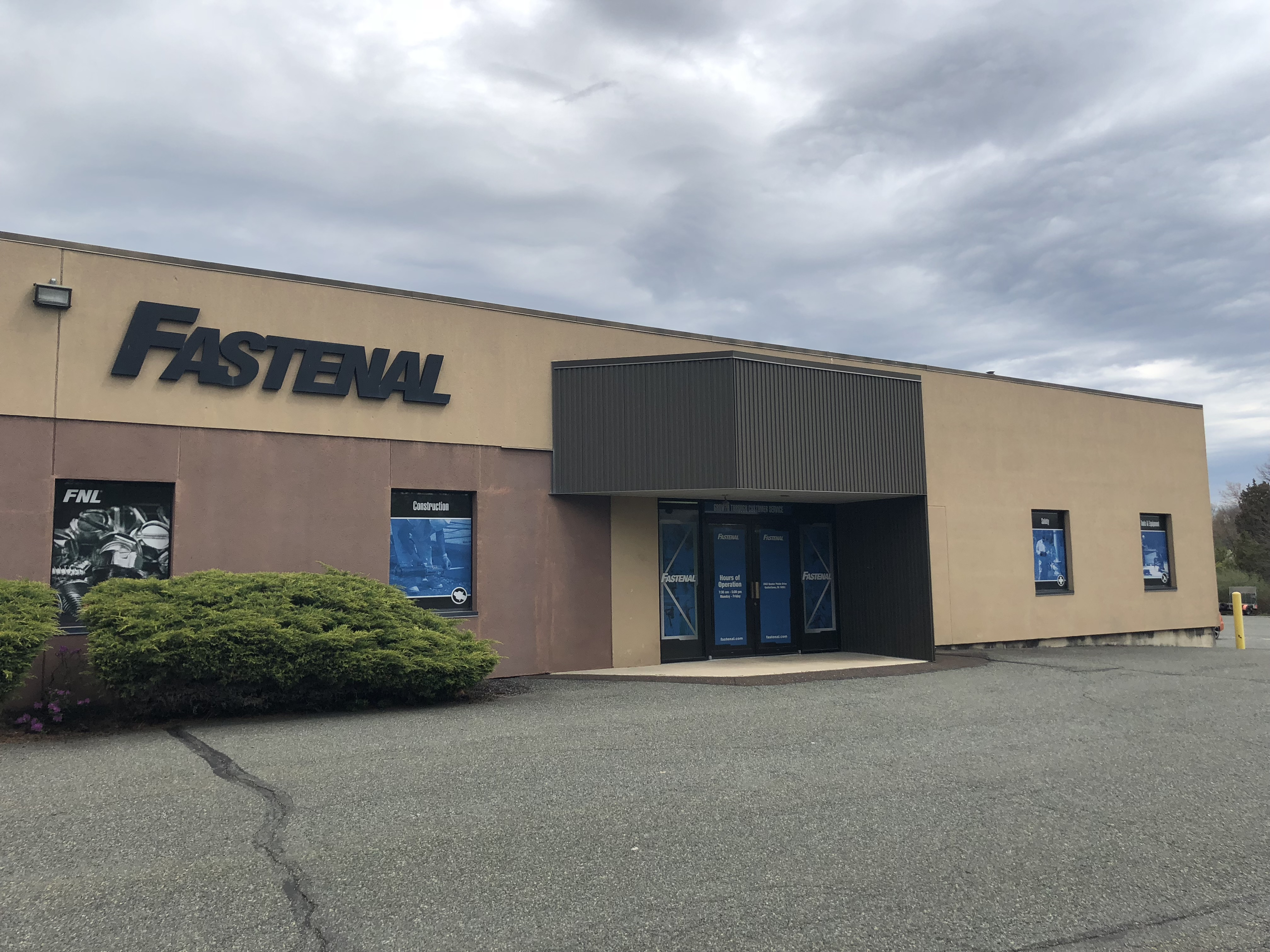
2018 Bolt Award winning branch located in Quakertown, PA

Fastenal first sold mostly fasteners such as screws, threaded rods, and nuts, which are used in construction and manufacturing. Today's product range is more diverse, and the company had a total of 690,000 individual products as of 2010. In addition to a plethora of SKUs, the company offers a variety of services, including inventory management, small fastener manufacture, vending and machining.

Fastenal has retail stores in every U.S. state, every province of Canada, 14 Mexican states, Puerto Rico and Panama.

As of 2000, the company employs 400-plus people at six manufacturing locations, including one manufacturing bolts made using a newer method, cold heading, in Rockford, Illinois; an operation in Wallingford, Connecticut, and another in Malaysia, etc.

Internationally, Fastenal has sites in China, Dominican Republic, Hungary, Malaysia, the Netherlands, Germany, Singapore and the United Kingdom. In 2006, the company had two sourcing offices in Asia, China and Taiwan. Both have an accredited testing laboratory, which, as of 2007, was A2LA certified.

== Gallery ==
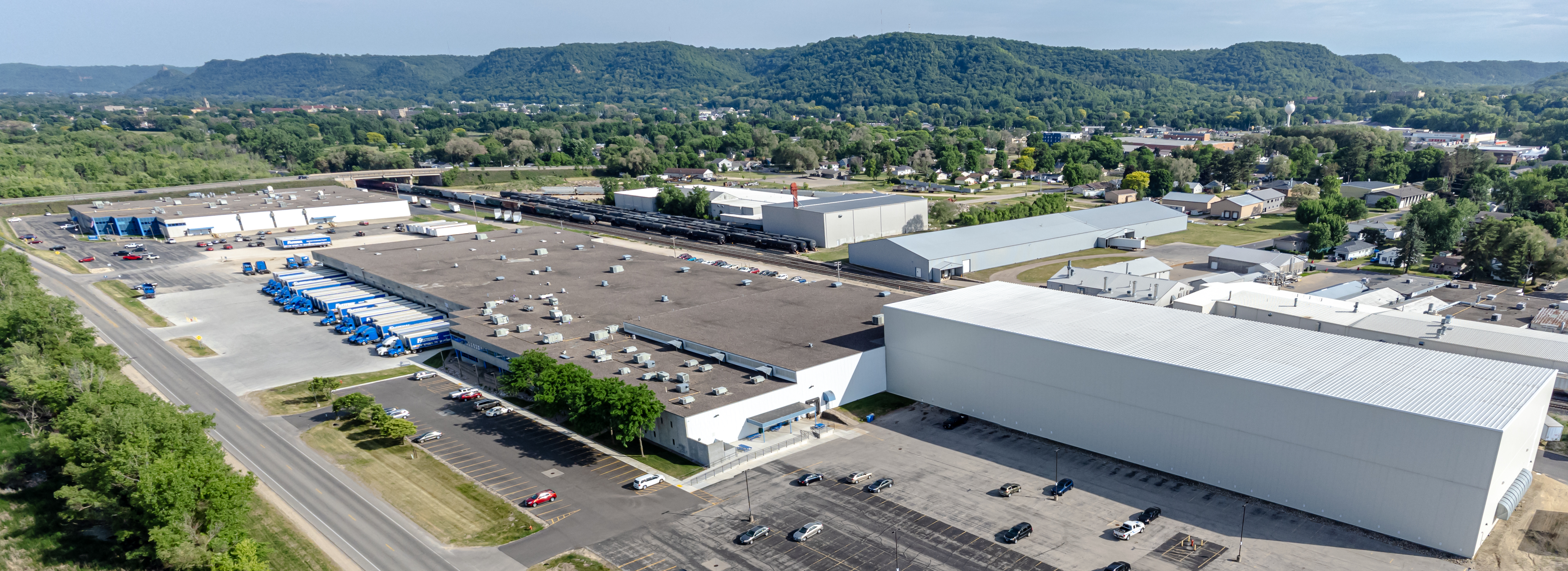
Fastenal in Winona

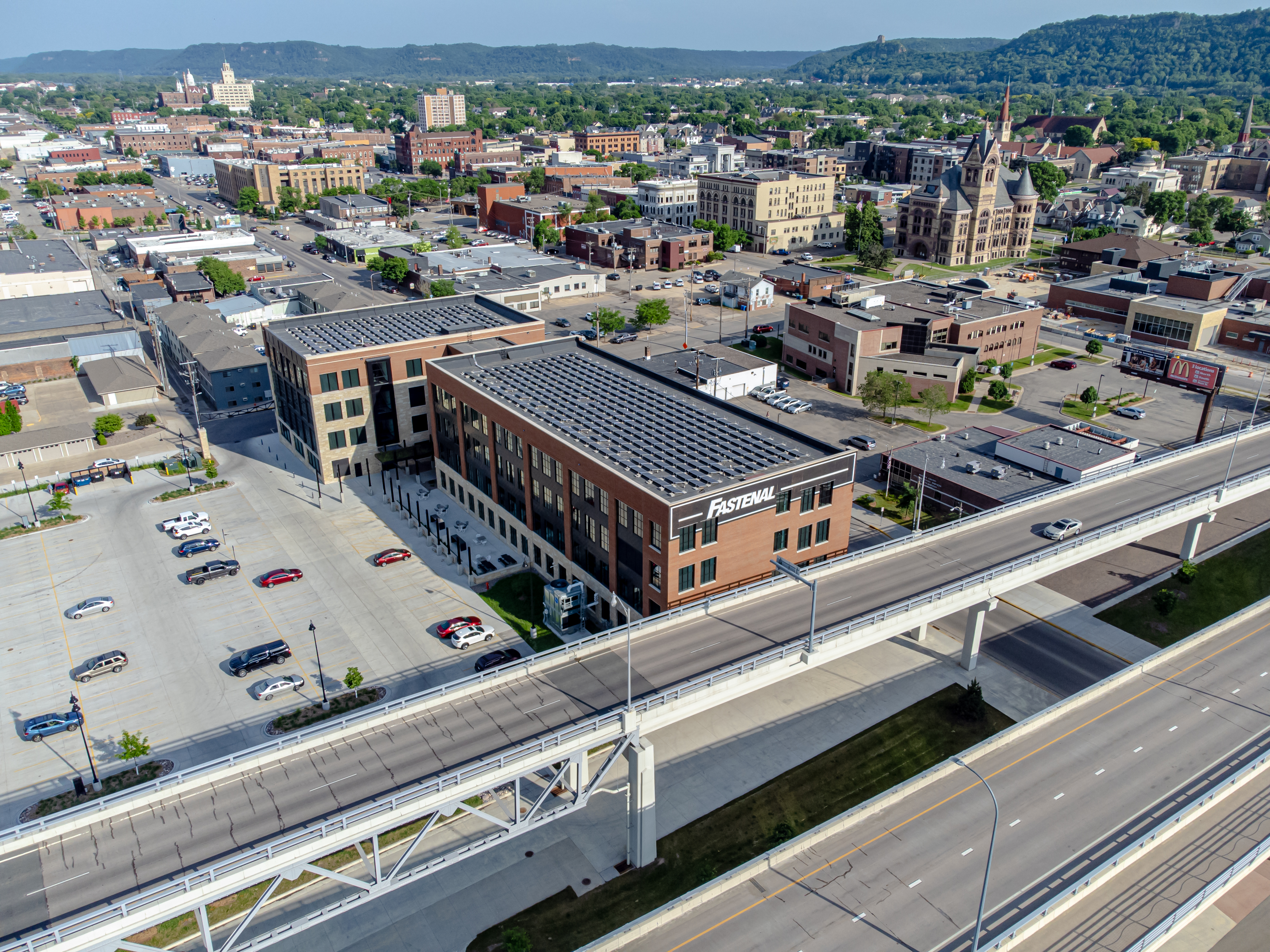
