= Mike Parry (politician) =

American politician (born 1953)

Member of the Minnesota Senate from the 26th district
- In office February 4, 2010 – January 7, 2013
- Preceded by: Dick Day
- Succeeded by: district redrawn

Personal details
- Born: January 5, 1953 (age 73) Albert Lea, Minnesota, US
- Party: Republican Party of Minnesota
- Education: Brown Institute of Broadcasting
- Occupation: Businessman, legislator

Michael J. Parry (born January 5, 1953) is a Minnesota politician and former member of the Minnesota Senate representing District 26, which included portions of Dodge, Freeborn, Goodhue, Mower, Olmsted, Rice, Steele, and Waseca counties in the southeastern part of the state.

== Early life, education, and business career ==
Perry was born and raised in Albert Lea. Parry served in the Minnesota Army National Guard, receiving an honorable discharge as a staff sergeant, and attended Brown Institute of Broadcasting in Minneapolis.

Parry owns and manages a marketing and motivation company and his family owns the Godfather's Pizza franchise in Waseca. He has managed numerous radio stations in Minnesota, Iowa, and Michigan, and owned radio station KQAQ in Austin. He was vice president of Custom Publishing of Fort Dodge, Iowa, and also co-owned a motocross company.

== Political career ==
Parry was a member of the Waseca City Council from 2004 to 2008.

A Republican, he won a special election on January 26, 2010, succeeding Senator Dick Day, who resigned on January 8, 2010, to head Racino Now, an organization dedicating to lobbying for slots at the state's two horse-racing tracks. He was elected to a full term in the 2010 general election.

Parry was sworn in as a senator on February 4, 2010. He chaired the Senate State Government Innovation and Veterans Committee, and was a member of the Senate's Finance and Transportation committees

In October 2011, Parry announced he would run in against incumbent Democratic U.S. Representative Tim Walz in Minnesota's 1st congressional district. He was defeated in the August 2012 Republican primary by Allen Quist, 45.9% to 54.1%.

== Other activities ==
Parry received law enforcement training and served as a police officer with the Morristown and Jackson police departments, and as a deputy sheriff with the Freeborn County Sheriff's Department. He was president of the Waseca Rotary, and was a member of the Waseca Economic Development Authority and Waseca Development Corporation. He was also president of the Albert Lea Jaycees. He is a licensed general aviation pilot.
