= Neva Walker =

American politician

Member of the Minnesota House of Representatives from the 61B district
- In office January 3, 2001 – January 5, 2009
- Preceded by: Linda Wejcman
- Succeeded by: Jeff Hayden

Personal details
- Born: December 14, 1971 (age 54) Minneapolis, Minnesota
- Party: Democratic

Neva Walker (born December 14, 1971) is an American politician who served in the Minnesota House of Representatives from district 61B from 2001 to 2009. Walker was the first African-American woman to be elected to the Minnesota Legislature.

== Legislative service ==
Walker ran for District 61B in South Minneapolis in 2000. She was endorsed by the Democratic-Farmer-Labor party. District 61B at the time was 35% African American and a DFL stronghold. She ran against Republican Andy Lindberg.She decided to run for office after she had a negative experience demonstrating with homeless people at the Capitol.

Prior to her election, six African-American men had been elected to the legislature but no women; John Francis Wheaton was the first in 1899. Upon her election, she joined Greg Gray as the only two African Americans in the legislature. On May 16, 2008, she became the first African-American woman to gavel the House into session.

In 2003, Walker received a letter from the lawyer of Corcoran Republican Arlon Lindner that was addressed to her as "Walker-Black". Walker said racist incidents she faced were "emotionally and mentally draining."

Her committee assignments included finance, health and human services, and mental health. Walker served four terms.

== Personal life ==
Walker grew up in Minneapolis. Her mother, Clarissa Walker, was program manager for Sabathani Community Center for over thirty years. Walker graduated from Minneapolis South High School. Walker had one son, Shae, who passed in 2021. She married in 2007.

Walker attended the University of Minnesota and studied sociology. She worked as a youth development coordinator for the Minneapolis Area United Way and had a history as an affordable housing advocate.
