= Sequence (game) =

Abstract strategy board and card game

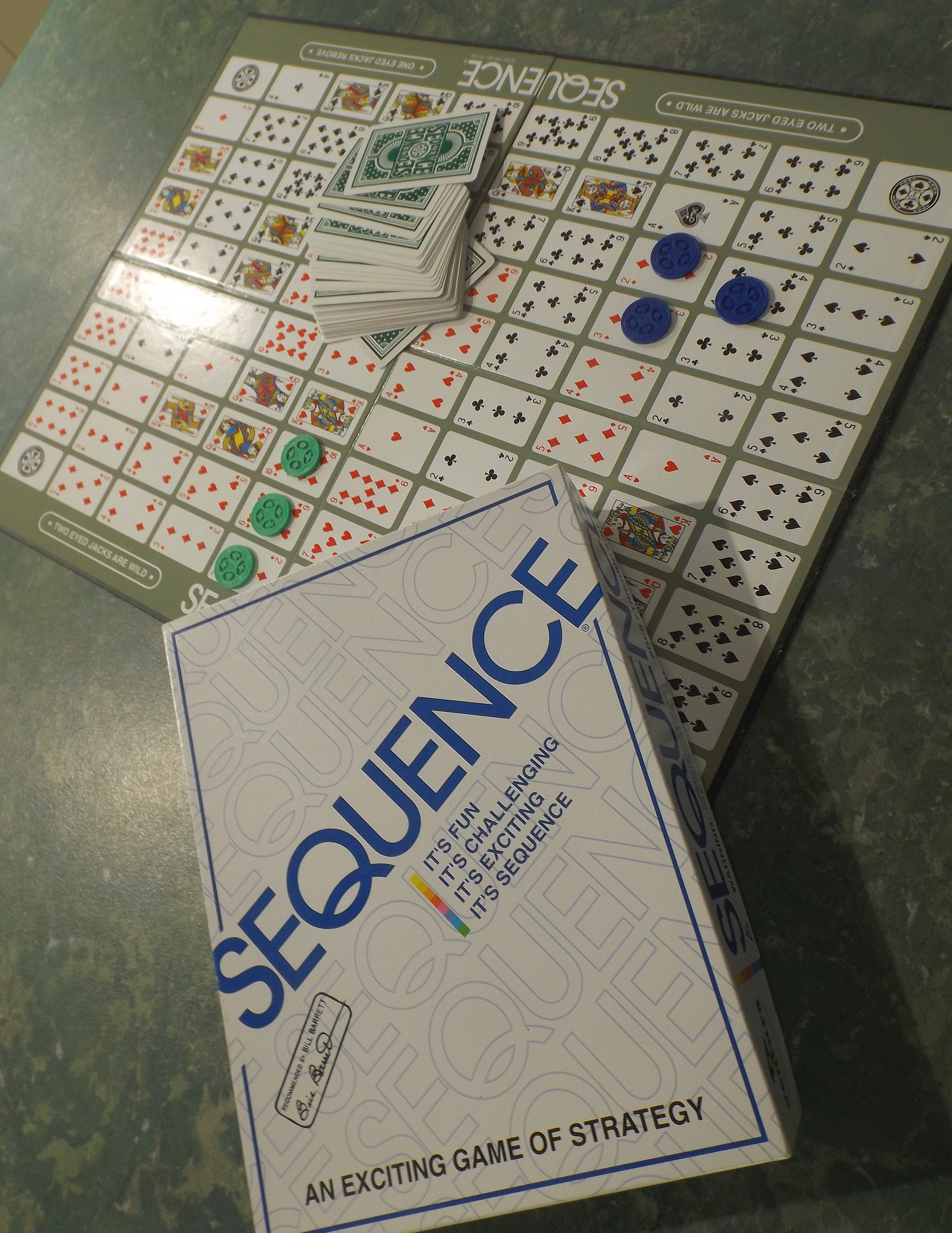
Sequence board, box, chips and cards

Sequence is an abstract strategy tabletop party game. Sequence was invented by Douglas Reuter. He originally called the game Sequence Five. In 2017, Goliath Game Company bought Jax, and in early 2018 also bought all licensor rights and now owns 100% of the game Sequence. Doug Reuter is acknowledged as the inventor of Sequence on all newly produced copies of the game - both on the box and in the printed rules.

== Objective ==
The object of the game is to form a row of five poker chips, called a sequence, on the board by placing the chips on the board spaces corresponding to cards played from the player's hand.

== Strategy ==
Each corner of the board has a "Free" space that all players can use to their advantage at any time.

To form rows, chips may be placed vertically, horizontally or diagonally. Each complete row of five (or four and a free corner space) is counted as a sequence. Sequences of the same color may intersect, but only at a single position.

Sequence rules dictate no table talk or coaching between team members and a precise order in which hands must be played (card, chip, replace card). If a player forgets to replace a card on their turn and if any of the other players points it out (by calling out 'jhampus') then, they cannot make it up in a later one and must continue playing the game with a reduced number of cards.

In a two-player or two-team game, the sequences required to win the game can be made to overlap with each other, resulting in two sequences formed by nine chips instead of ten. This is because the rules explicitly state that players may use any single chip from their own first sequence as part of a second one. A straight row of nine chips also counts as two sequences.

== Winning ==
The game ends when a player or team completes a set number of sequences. In a two-player or two-team game, the number of sequences needed to win is two, while in a three-player or three-team game, only one sequence is needed to win the game.

If no one in the end manages to make the target number of sequences, the game ends in a draw.

== Variations ==
=== Unofficial house rules ===
A common alternative to standard Sequence game play is to go past the minimal number of sequences to win. Players compete to fill the entire board with complete sequences of five chips (in each player's preferred color). Keep score of one point per sequence created. Different from standard game play, chips from completed sequences may be removed to prevent opponents from scoring. For added difficulty, players may opt not to reshuffle the deck when it runs out of cards. Game play ends when the board is filled and no additional moves are possible. To declare a winner, points are tallied up for each player or team. Whoever has the most points wins the game.

Sequence can also be integrated into a drinking game for adults, where each player picks one (or two) number or face cards. Each time any of the chosen cards is discarded, by any player, the player who chose it has to drink. Last man standing (or the person who wins via the usual way) wins.

An alternative method of play is to apply the Camden Throwdown technique in which half of the normal rules are thrown out in exchange for a streamlined version of the structured game or activity.

Sudden Death Overtime: When one player/ team completes their final sequence necessary to win, an overtime period of play can be forced if the next player/team can complete their final sequence needed on their next turn. All chips remain on the board. The first player/team to complete another sequence wins.

=== Rulebook house rules ===
An optional rule in the rulebook requires the player forming a sequence on the board to announce it. If left unannounced, that row will not be considered a completed sequence until the player or team's next turn, during which they can announce the sequence.

A game play variation allows pairs that become trapped by placing a chip of own color on each side of a pair of a single opponent to be removed from the board. One of three or more are not an option, but two, not a part of a sequence can be stolen by an opponent. Additionally, this allows for another option to win, namely by capturing any five pairs of any opponent.

Another variation of the original rules is called the "corner rule". Instead of corners being free places, a team may put their color token in the corner by choosing to skip their turn. This only happens when four of their color are lined up against a corner. Another team may block by putting their token there if they have a two-eyed jack. This variation has become popular since 2010, because players felt like a small rule tweak was needed. The corner rule started as an unofficial variation, but has since been embraced by the game designer and now becomes an official rule variation also used in some championships.

=== Official variations ===
Sequence comes in several versions, including Sequence; Sequence – States and Capitals; Sequence Numbers; Sequence 25th Anniversary Edition; Jumbo Sequence; Travel Sequence; Sequence Deluxe Edition; and Sequence for Kids. The major difference between the different Sequence versions is the game board sizes, shapes, and themes.

==== Sequence Dice ====
Sequence Dice is a spin-off of the Sequence board game. Instead of cards, the game uses a pair of dice. The object of Sequence Dice is to be the first player or team to connect a "sequence" of five chips in a row on the board, just as in the original game. However, a player or team only has to achieve one sequence in order to win instead of the two sometimes needed in the original, and in a two-player or two-team game, the required sequence consists of six chips in a row instead of five. In addition, a player may replace an opponent's chip with one of own color by rolling a number, but only when all four spaces for that number are already occupied. With the addition of this rule, the game does not end when the board is full.

The board displays four interlocking arrangements of the numerals 3 to 9, along with pictures of dice. The four corner spaces on the board depict dice arranged in a "snake eyes" pattern, i.e. displaying one and one. The four spaces in the center of the board depict dice showing a "boxcars" pattern or a double-six. There are also three special rolls:

- Rolling a 10 allows the player to remove an opponent's chip from the board
- Rolling an 11 allows the player to add a chip of own color to any open space on the board
- Rolling a 2 or 12 allows the player to take another turn immediately after adding a chip to any designated space on the board

== Legal issues ==
During a series of legal disputes, Douglas Reuter claimed Jax violated its licensing agreement which would provide grounds for contract termination. In response, Jax denied any violation. Meanwhile, both sides continue to profit from game sales. Jax garners 80 percent of its revenue from Sequence; Reuter receives a royalty on sales of Sequence. Mr. Reuter has also started a new game company called, "Game Inventors of America," which is located in Corinth, Texas.

Unauthorized variations of Sequence have appeared many times over the years. Names of the unauthorized versions include, "One-Eyed Jack," "Jack Foolery," and "Jack Off." In "One-Eyed Jack," the board is constructed using actual playing cards. A small group from Sanpete County, Utah claims to have created a similar game prior to Sequence called "Rooker" using Rook cards but were unsuccessful in securing a patent first.

In March 2015, Jax Ltd. filed a legal claim against independent video game developer Iridium Studios over the name of their rhythm video game titled Sequence. Not wanting to pay legal fees challenging the claim, the video game developer promptly renamed their game to Before the Echo.

== Reviews ==
- 1986 Games 100
