= Minnesota Department of Revenue =

Department overview
- Headquarters: Stassen Building, 600 North Robert Street, St. Paul, MN 55146
- Department executives: Paul Marquart, Commissioner; Lee Ho, Deputy Commissioner
- Website: www.revenue.state.mn.us

The Minnesota Department of Revenue (MNDOR) is an agency of the U.S. state of Minnesota. It manages and enforces the reporting, payment, and receipt of taxes owed to the state, as well as some other fees.

As of 2017, the department administered more than 30 taxes totaling almost $21 billion per year. In 2017, it had more than a thousand employees and processed half a million paper individual tax returns, which is about 15% of all individual tax returns in the state. The rest were electronically filed.

Its headquarters near the Minnesota State Capitol in St. Paul is named for former governor Harold Stassen.
