= Paul Marquart =

American politician (born 1957)

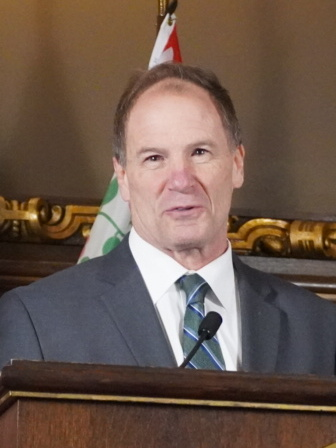
- Marquart in 2023

Member of the Minnesota House of Representatives from the 4B district (9B 2001–2013)
- In office January 3, 2001 – January 3, 2023
- Preceded by: Bob Westfall
- Succeeded by: Jim Joy

Minnesota Commissioner of Revenue
- Incumbent
- Assumed office January 2, 2023
- Appointed by: Tim Walz

Personal details
- Born: January 9, 1957 (age 69) Fargo, North Dakota
- Party: Minnesota Democratic–Farmer–Labor Party
- Spouse: Colleen
- Children: 2
- Education: North Dakota State College of Science; University of North Dakota; Tri-College University
- Profession: Educator, legislator

Paul Marquart (born January 9, 1957) is a Minnesota politician serving as state commissioner for the Department of Revenue since 2023. A former member of the Minnesota House of Representatives, he represented District 4B, which included parts of Becker, Clay, and Norman counties in the northwestern part of the state. He is also a teacher.

Marquart graduated from Fargo North High School in Fargo, North Dakota, then went on to North Dakota State College of Science in Wahpeton, receiving his A.A., and to the University of North Dakota in Grand Forks, earning his B.A. in journalism in 1980 and his B.S. in social studies education in 1981. He earned his M.S. in education administration from Tri-College University in 1985. He has been a teacher in the Dilworth-Glyndon-Felton School District since 1984.

Marquart was a member of the Dilworth City Council from 1988 to 1989 and the city's mayor from 1990 to 2000.

Marquart was first elected to the House in 2000 and was reelected consistently until he retired in 2022. In 2022, he received the Orville L. Freeman Award for Distinguished Service to Greater Minnesota and Agricultural Issues at the Humphrey-Mondale Awards. In 2023, Tim Walz appointed Marquart Minnesota Commissioner of Revenue.
