= Carl Jacobson (Minnesota politician) =

American businessman and politician

Carl Jacobson (born July 27, 1969) was an American businessman and politician.

Jacobson was born in Hibbing, Saint Louis County, Minnesota. He received his bachelor's degree in accounting from Minnesota State University, Mankato. Jacobson lived with his wife and family in Vadnais Heights, Minnesota, and was a public accountant. He served in the Minnesota House of Representatives from 2001 to 2004 and was a Republican.
