= Barb Haake =

American politician (born 1940)

Member of the Minnesota House of Representatives from the 52B district
- In office 1999–2000

Personal details
- Born: November 13, 1940 (age 85)
- Party: Republican
- Children: 3
- Education: University of Minnesota
- Occupation: Employee Benefits Broker

Barbara Haake (born November 13, 1940) is an American politician in the state of Minnesota. She served in the Minnesota House of Representatives.
