= Dale Walz =

American politician (1964–2024)

Dale Walz (September 16, 1964 – June 8, 2024) was an American politician and police officer.

== Life and career ==
Walz lived in Brainerd, Minnesota, and received his associate degree in criminal justice from Central Lakes College. He served in the Baxter, Minnesota police department. Walz served in the Minnesota House of Representatives from 2001 to 2004 and was a Republican.

Walz died in Tucson, Arizona, on June 8, 2024, at the age of 59.
