= Jim Seifert =

American politician

Member of the Minnesota House of Representatives from the 57A district
- In office 1999–2000

Personal details
- Born: November 24, 1956 (age 69) Brown County, Minnesota, U.S.
- Party: Republican
- Children: 2
- Education: University of Notre Dame; University of St. Thomas; Creighton University School of Law
- Occupation: attorney

James Joseph Seifert (born November 24, 1956) is an American politician in the state of Minnesota. He served in the Minnesota House of Representatives.
