= Bob Westfall (politician) =

American politician

Robert L. Westfall

Member of the Minnesota House of Representatives from the 9B district
- In office 1997–2001
- Succeeded by: Paul Marquart

Personal details
- Born: March 6, 1935 (age 91) Wilkin County, Minnesota, U.S.
- Party: Republican
- Spouse: Darlene
- Children: 4
- Occupation: farmer

Robert Leroy Westfall (born March 6, 1935) is an American politician in the state of Minnesota. He served in the Minnesota House of Representatives.
