= Julie Storm =

American politician (born 1933)

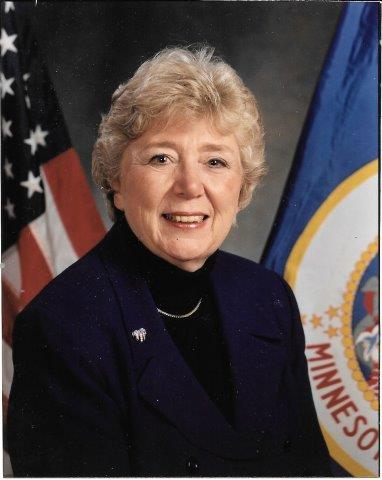

Member of the Minnesota House of Representatives from the 24B district
- In office 1999–2000

Personal details
- Born: Julie Jane Wedwick; February 22, 1933 (age 93) Long Prairie, Minnesota, U.S.
- Party: Republican
- Spouse: Charles Lee Storm
- Children: 3
- Education: Macalester College
- Occupation: Businesswoman

Julie Jane Storm (born February 22, 1933) is an American politician in the state of Minnesota. She served in the Minnesota House of Representatives.

== Early life, education, and business career ==
Julie Jane Storm (born February 22, 1933) is an American businesswoman, community leader, and former legislator who served in the Minnesota House of Representatives.

Born in Long Prairie, Minnesota, Storm spent most of her childhood in Minnesota. She attended Macalester College and participated in the nursing program at Abbott-Northwestern Hospital. She worked as a registered nurse for more than 25 years before pursuing a career in interior design. After completing professional training, she became a Board-Certified Interior Designer through the Florida Board of Architecture and Interior Design. She successfully operated her own interior design business until returning to Minnesota to care for her mother.

After returning to Minnesota, Storm purchased and restored a historic home in St. Peter, transforming it into the successful Engesser House Bed and Breakfast, which she owned and operated until 1998.

Storm was elected to a two-year term in the Minnesota House of Representatives, representing District 24B. During her legislative service, she authored legislation to protect families who had been victimized by dishonest contractors following the devastating St. Peter tornado. The bill passed unanimously.

In addition to her legislative work, Storm served on a board that assisted new entrepreneurs and small businesses. She also served on the Minnesota Board of Tourism and the Minnesota Board on Aging, contributing to economic development and services for older adults throughout the state.

In 2008, Storm relocated to Bella Vista, Arkansas, where she continued her work in website development and graphic design, creating custom business cards, brochures, and event programs. She currently maintains more than 20 websites, the majority of which support nonprofit organizations.

Continuing her lifelong commitment to public service, Storm has served three terms in the Arkansas Silver-Hair Legislature, advocating for issues affecting older Arkansans.
