= Kenric Scheevel =

American politician

Member of the Minnesota Senate from the 31st district
- In office December 8, 1994 – January 7, 2003
- Preceded by: Duane Benson
- Succeeded by: Bob Kierlin

Personal details
- Born: July 7, 1956 (age 70) Olmsted County, Minnesota, U.S.
- Party: Republican
- Spouse: Karen
- Children: 2
- Education: University of Iowa; South Dakota State University
- Occupation: farmer

Kenric James Scheevel (born July 7, 1956) is an American politician in the state of Minnesota. He served in the Minnesota State Senate.
