= Carolyn McElfatrick =

American politician

Member of the Minnesota House of Representatives from the 3B district
- In office January 4, 2011 – January 7, 2013
- Preceded by: Loren Solberg
- Succeeded by: district redrawn

Personal details
- Born: October 1944 (age 81–82) Austin, Minnesota, U.S.
- Party: Republican
- Spouse: Robert
- Children: 2
- Education: Methodist-Kahler School of Nursing
- Profession: registered nurse (retired), legislator

Carolyn J. McElfatrick (born October 1944) is a Minnesota politician and former member of the Minnesota House of Representatives who represented District 3B, which included portions of Aitkin and Itasca counties in the northern part of the state. A Republican, she is also a retired registered nurse.

McElfatrick was first elected to the House in 2010. She served on the Agriculture and Rural Development Policy and Finance, the Health and Human Services Finance, the Health and Human Services Reform, and the State Government Finance committees.

McElfatrick graduated from Methodist-Kahler School of Nursing in Rochester, Minnesota, and also attended graduate school for nurse anesthesia at the Mayo Clinic in Rochester. She accompanied her husband, a medical doctor when he served in the Army Medical Corps, first at Fort Dix, New Jersey, then in Pusan, South Korea.

Prior to returning to Minnesota, McElfatrick and her family lived in Denver, Colorado, where her husband built a surgical practice, and where she worked as a coordinator of cancer clinical drug trials for the United States Department of Health and Human Services National Institutes of Health and the National Cancer Institute. More recently, she served on the Itasca County Health and Human Services Committee.
