= Doug Reuter =

American politician (born 1949)

Member of the Minnesota House of Representatives from the 28A district
- In office 1997–2000

Personal details
- Born: March 17, 1949 (age 77) Superior, Wisconsin, U.S.
- Party: Republican; Independent
- Spouse: Nancy
- Children: 3
- Education: Metropolitan State University
- Occupation: businessman

Doug Reuter (born March 17, 1949) is an American politician and board game inventor in the state of Minnesota. He served in the Minnesota House of Representatives.

Reuter grew up in the Twin Cities. His family lived in Eden Prairie, Minnesota for 18 years where he ran unsuccessfully for city council and mayor. His family eventually moved to Owatonna which is where he was elected as a representative. Reuter served in the U.S. Navy. Prior to his election, he served as a lobbyist for a waste management firm that sought to encourage recycling and composting instead of landfills and mass incineration.

Reuter also invented the board game Sequence. Reuter first imagined the board game in 1974 in a dream. He sold the game to a distributor in 1981. The game was not initially popular but grew in popularity in the early 1990s and in 1995 Reuter quit his job to market the game.
