= Steve Wenzel =

American politician from Minnesota (born 1946)

Member of the Minnesota House of Representatives from the 12B district
- In office 1993–2001
- In office 1973–1982

Member of the Minnesota House of Representatives from the 13B district
- In office 1983–1992

Personal details
- Born: December 7, 1946 (age 79) Little Falls, Minnesota, U.S.
- Party: Republican (formerly Minnesota Democratic–Farmer–Labor Party)
- Education: St. Cloud State University
- Occupation: Educator

Stephen George Wenzel (born December 7, 1946) is an American politician in the state of Minnesota.

He served in the Minnesota House of Representatives.

Originally a member of the Democratic Patrty, he joined the Republican Party in 2022.
