= Michelle Rifenberg =

American politician and homemaker

Member of the Minnesota House of Representatives
- In office 1997–2002

Personal details
- Born: January 30, 1957 (age 69) La Crescent, Minnesota, U.S.
- Party: Republican
- Education: Viterbo University (BS)

Michelle Rifenberg (born January 30, 1957) is an American politician and homemaker who served as a member of the Minnesota House of Representatives from 1997 to 2002.

== Background ==
A native of La Crescent, Minnesota, Rifenberg received her Bachelor of Science degree from Viterbo University and was a homemaker. She served in the Minnesota House of Representatives from 1997 to 2002 as a Republican.
