= Chuck Fowler =

American politician

Member of the Minnesota Senate from the 26th district
- In office 2001–2002

Personal details
- Born: December 21, 1939 (age 86) Martin County, Minnesota
- Party: Minnesota Democratic–Farmer–Labor Party
- Spouse: Deb
- Children: two
- Occupation: project manager

Charles Edward Fowler (born December 21, 1939) is an American politician in the state of Minnesota. He served in the Minnesota State Senate.
