= Dale Swapinski =

American politician

Member of the Minnesota House of Representatives from the 7A district
- In office 1999–2002

Personal details
- Born: October 3, 1953 (age 73) Duluth, Minnesota, U.S.
- Party: Minnesota Democratic–Farmer–Labor Party
- Children: two
- Education: College of St. Scholastica
- Occupation: teacher

Dale Edward Swapinski (born October 3, 1953) is an American politician in the state of Minnesota. He served in the Minnesota House of Representatives.
