= Claire Robling =

American politician (born 1956)

Member of the Minnesota Senate from the 35th district
- In office January 7, 1997 – January 7, 2013
- Preceded by: Terry Johnston
- Succeeded by: district redrawn

Personal details
- Born: October 22, 1956 (age 69) Chanhassen, Minnesota, U.S.
- Party: Republican
- Spouse: Tony
- Children: 2
- Education: College of St. Catherine
- Occupation: Journalist, freelance writer, politician

Claire A. Robling (born October 22, 1956) is an American politician who served as a member of the Minnesota Senate representing District 35, which included portions of Carver, Le Sueur, Scott and Sibley counties in the southern Twin Cities metropolitan area. A Republican, she was first elected to the Senate in 1996, and reelected in 2000, 2002, 2006 and 2010. She served as an assistant minority leader from 2003 to 2006.

Robling was one of four assistant majority leaders during 2011–2012, and served as chair of the Senate Finance Committee. She was also a member of the Senate's Higher Education and Local Government & Elections committees. Her special legislative concerns included family and early childhood, transportation, taxes, education, and the environment.

Robling is a journalist and a freelance writer by profession. She graduated from Chaska High School in Chaska, and then attended the College of St. Catherine in Saint Paul. She was a reporter for the Shakopee Valley News in Shakopee from 1977 to 1980, an editor for the Jordan Independent in Jordan from 1980 to 1981, and a reporter and editor for the Prior Lake, Chanhassen, Chaska and Savage newspapers from 1982 to 1996. She and her husband live in Jordan and have two children.

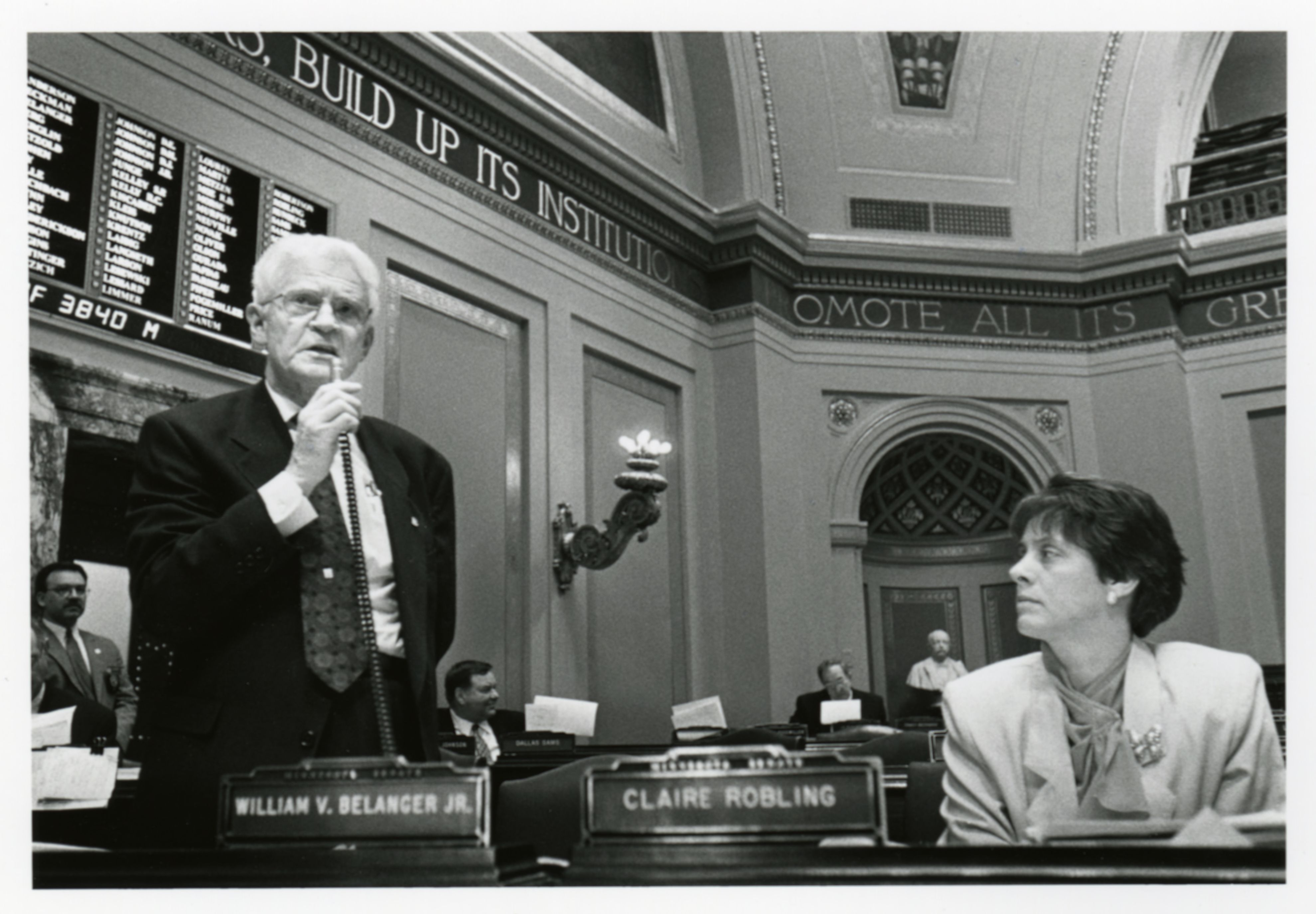
Senator William Belanger speaks on the Senate floor while Senator Claire Robling listens, St. Paul, Minnesota.
