= Sheila Kiscaden =

American politician (born 1946)

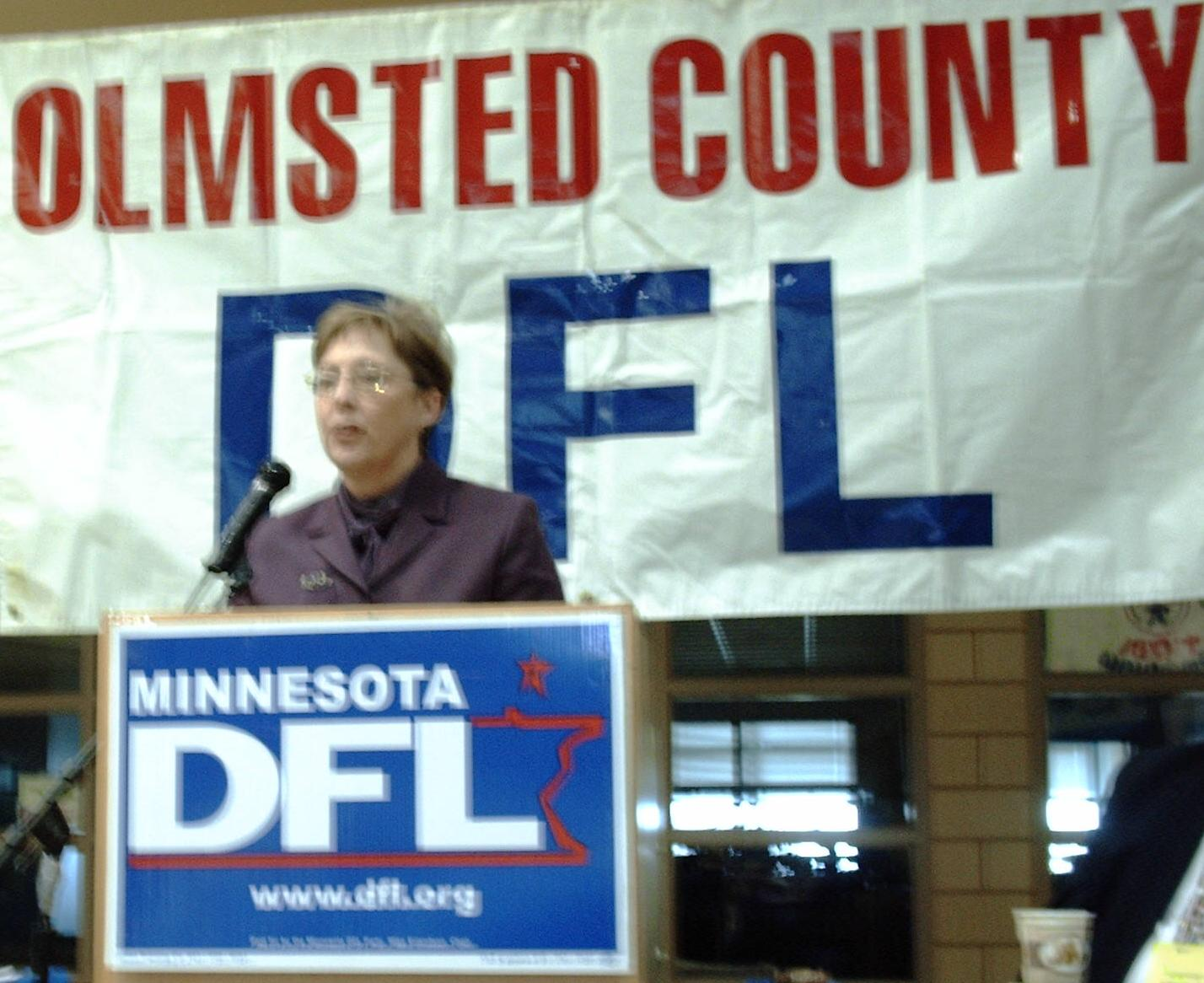

Member of the Minnesota Senate from the 30th district
- In office 1992 – January 2007

Personal details
- Born: April 21, 1946 (age 80)

Sheila Kiscaden (born April 21, 1946) is an American politician, community volunteer, and organizational development consultant. She was elected in 2012 to be one of the 7 Olmsted County Board of Commissioners and represents a district within Rochester, Minnesota. Olmsted County, Minnesota Commissioners serve on a non-partisan board: there are no party designations or endorsements.

Kiscaden is a former Minnesota State Senator from District 30, which includes much of Rochester and nearby rural areas. She was first elected to the Senate in 1992 as a Republican. In 2002, after being denied the Republican endorsement at the senate district convention, she ran as a member of the Independence Party of Minnesota. That fall she defeated the Republican candidate and a Democratic challenger in a three-way race.

Despite being elected as a member of the Independence Party, Kiscaden still caucused with the Republicans until they publicly separated from her. She was invited to join the Minnesota Democratic-Farmer-Labor Party (DFL) caucus, which she did, though she did not formally join that party until January 2006.

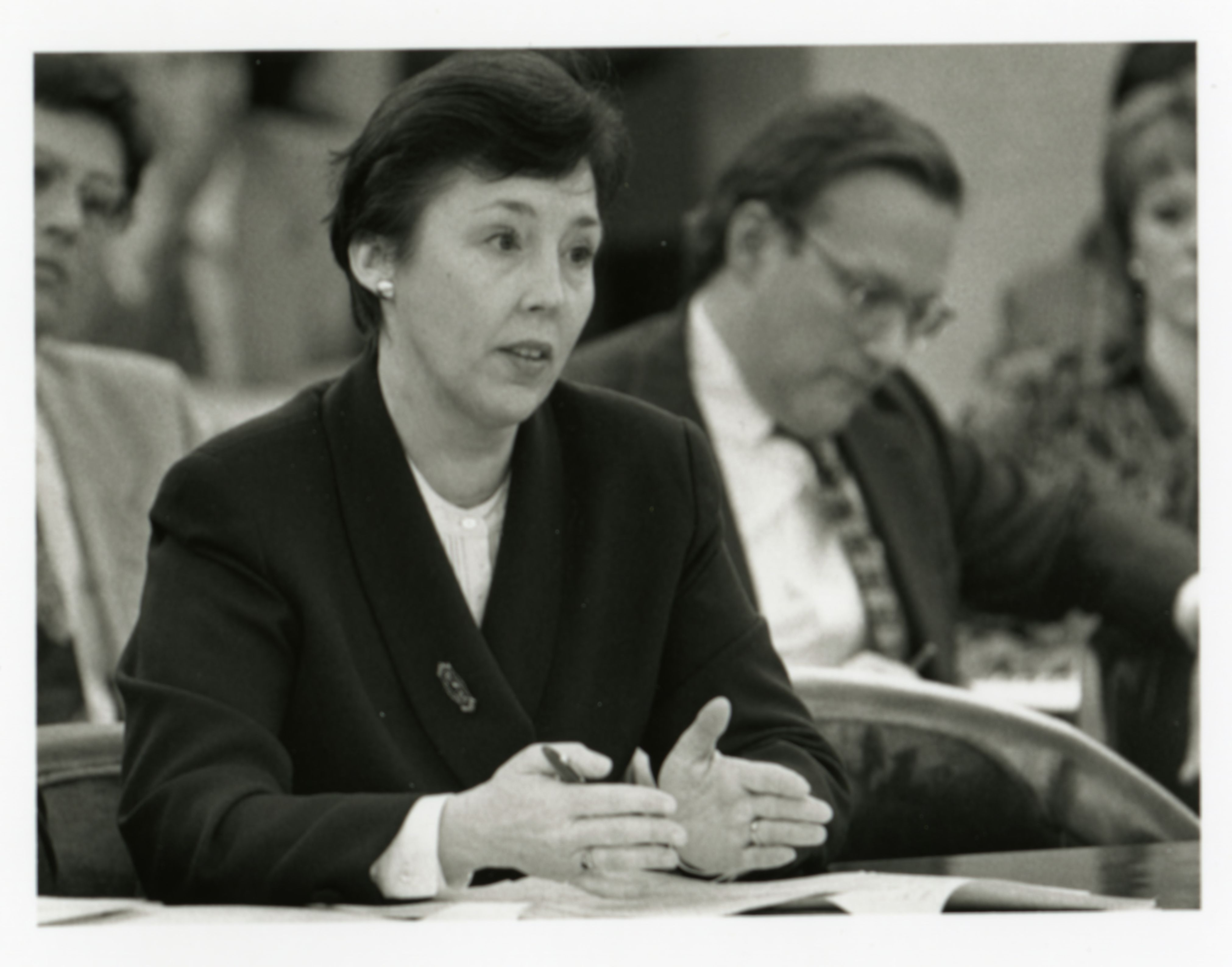
Senator Sheila Kiscaden speaks during a committee hearing, St. Paul, Minnesota.

In January 2006, Kiscaden became a candidate for Lieutenant Governor of Minnesota with DFLer Kelly Doran in his bid for governor. He dropped out of the race after only a couple of months. Kiscaden had endorsed another member of the DFL to succeed her in the legislature. Her most recent term in the State Senate ended in January 2007. Although recruited to run for Congress and to return to the Minnesota State Senate, Kiscaden chose to run for County Commissioner.

In that role she has served on the State Community Health Advisory Council, chairing a Health Equity Task Force in 2015, and serving on the Future of Public Health Task Force in 2017. As a State Senator she had a lead role in health care and human services policy. That policy interest and expertise has led to serving on a variety of state commissions and task forces since being elected to the County Board. This includes serving on the State Community Health Advisory Council, for which she chaired a work group on Health Equity, and serving on the Future of Public Health Task Force. She created a task force that is examining the consequences of parental incarceration on children and considering state and local policies to reduce the long-term negative developmental impacts on children.

Her expertise in health, human services, and corrections was developed from her years as human services planner and program manager at the county level as well as her 25 years of experience as and organizational development consultant for government and non-profit organizations.

A graduate of the University of Minnesota in Education where she was a member of Phi Beta Kappa, she also earned a master's degree in Public Administration from the University of Southern California. She used a Bush Leadership Fellowship to earn a second master's degree in Participation, Development and Social Change from the Institute of Development Studies at the University of Sussex, Brighton, England.

She has extensive experience as an engaged community volunteer and has been the founder of several local initiatives, including the Beat the Odds Scholarship Program, Rochester Issues Forum, SE MN Together, and More Women on the Move. Her long history of service on local boards and commissions continues. She is currently an Advisory Board Member of the Future Services Institute, participating in the Government Alliance for Racial Equity, and on the board of Seasons Hospice.
