= David Ten Eyck =

American politician

Member of the Minnesota Senate from the 4th district
- In office 1996–1999

Personal details
- Born: December 29, 1953 (age 72) Olmsted County, Minnesota, U.S.
- Party: Minnesota Democratic–Farmer–Labor Party
- Spouse: Lisa Wigand
- Education: Grinnell College, California Western School of Law
- Occupation: attorney

David John Ten Eyck (born December 29, 1953) is an American politician in the state of Minnesota. A member of the DFL, He served in the Minnesota State Senate between 1996 and 1999.
