= Tom Pugh (politician) =

American politician

Member of the Minnesota Public Utilities Commission
- In office August 31, 2004 – January 3, 2011
- Appointed by: Tim Pawlenty

Member of the Minnesota House of Representatives from the 39A district
- In office January 3, 1989 – August 31, 2004
- Preceded by: Bert McKasy
- Succeeded by: Rick Hansen

Minnesota House Minority Leader
- In office January 5, 1999 – January 6, 2003
- Preceded by: Steve Sviggum
- Succeeded by: Matt Entenza

Personal details
- Born: August 3, 1949 (age 77) South St. Paul, Minnesota
- Party: DFL
- Spouse: Susan
- Education: Dartmouth College; University of Minnesota Law School
- Occupation: Attorney

Thomas W. Pugh (born August 3, 1949) is a Minnesota politician, a former member of the Minnesota Public Utilities Commission, and a former minority leader of the Minnesota House of Representatives.

== Early life ==
Pugh received his undergraduate degree from Dartmouth College in Hanover, New Hampshire, graduating cum laude. He went on to receive his juris doctor from the University of Minnesota Law School. After graduating, he went into private practice with the South St. Paul law firm of Thuet, Pugh, Rogosheske, and Atkins.

== Career ==
A Democrat, Pugh was first elected to the House in 1988, representing the South St. Paul area of Dakota County. After the DFL Party lost its legislative majority in the 1998 election, he was elected by his caucus to serve as Minority Leader, a position he held until 2003.

In August 2004, Pugh was appointed to the Minnesota Public Utilities Commission by Republican Governor Tim Pawlenty. He officially resigned his legislative position on August 31, 2004. He was reappointed to the commission in January 2005. His term expired in January 2011.

Political offices
Preceded by Steve Sviggum	Minnesota House Minority Leader; 1999 – 2003	Succeeded by Matt Entenza
Preceded by Bert McKasy	Minnesota State Representative for District 39A; 1989 – 2004	Succeeded by Rick Hansen
