= George Cassell =

American politician

Member of the Minnesota House of Representatives from the 10B district
- In office 1999–2002

Personal details
- Born: May 25, 1935 (age 91)
- Party: Republican
- Spouse: Carol
- Children: 3
- Education: University of Wisconsin–River Falls; University of Wyoming
- Occupation: educator, academic administrator

George Cassell Sr. (born May 25, 1935) is an American politician in the state of Minnesota. He served in the Minnesota House of Representatives.
