= Doug Fuller =

American politician

Member of the Minnesota House of Representatives from the 4A district
- In office 1999–2004

Personal details
- Born: May 14, 1968 (age 58) Hennepin County, Minnesota, U.S.
- Party: Republican Party of Minnesota
- Spouse: Jeri Lynne
- Education: Bemidji State University

Douglas Andrew Fuller (born May 14, 1968) is an American politician in the state of Minnesota. He served in the Minnesota House of Representatives.
