= Andrew Westerberg =

American politician

Member of the Minnesota House of Representatives from the 51A district
- In office 1999–2006

Personal details
- Born: August 15, 1954 (age 72) Hennepin County, Minnesota, U.S.
- Party: Republican
- Spouse: Catherine
- Children: 4
- Education: Anoka-Ramsey Community College, The American College
- Occupation: Insurance Agent

Andrew Jon Westerberg (born August 15, 1954) is an American politician in the state of Minnesota. He served in the Minnesota House of Representatives.
