= Luanne Koskinen =

American politician (born 1940)

Member of the Minnesota House of Representatives from the 49B district
- In office 1997–2002

Personal details
- Born: 1940 (age 85–86)
- Party: Democratic (DFL)
- Spouse: Lauri (Larry) Koskinen
- Children: 4
- Education: University of Minnesota
- Occupation: business representative

Luanne Shirley Koskinen (born 1940) is an American politician in the state of Minnesota. She served in the Minnesota House of Representatives.
