= Darlene Luther =

American politician and business consultant

Darlene Joyce Luther (née Dunphy) (August 17, 1947 – January 30, 2002) was an American politician and business consultant.

Born in Cloquet, Minnesota, Luther graduated from White Bear High School in 1965. She went to the University of Minnesota and graduated from the University of St. Thomas with a degree in business administration. She was a business consultant, substitute teacher, and flight attendant. Luther served in the Minnesota House of Representatives from 1993 until her death in 2002. Luther was a Democrat. Her husband, Bill Luther, also served in the Minnesota Legislature and the United States House of Representatives. Luther died of stomach cancer at her house in Brooklyn Park, Minnesota.
