= Dave Johnson (Minnesota politician) =

American politician

Member of the Minnesota Senate from the 40th district
- In office 1997–2002

Personal details
- Born: August 21, 1963 (age 63) Hennepin County, Minnesota, U.S.
- Party: Democratic (DFL)
- Spouse: Tracy
- Children: 3
- Education: Augsburg College; University of Minnesota Law School
- Occupation: Attorney

David Howard Johnson (born August 21, 1963) is an American politician in the state of Minnesota. He served in the Minnesota Senate from 1997 to 2002.
