= Tim Wilkin =

American politician

Member of the Minnesota House of Representatives from the 38A district
- In office 1999–2006

Personal details
- Born: November 5, 1965 (age 60) Freeport, Illinois, U.S.
- Party: Republican
- Spouse: Eileen
- Children: 4
- Education: University of Iowa
- Occupation: Business and Insurance Underwriter

Tim Wilkin (born November 5, 1965) is an American politician in the state of Minnesota. He served in the Minnesota House of Representatives.
