= Dick Day =

American politician (born 1937)

Richard "Dick" Day
- 1997 portrait of Day

Member of the Minnesota Senate from the 26th, 28th, 30th district
- In office 1991–2010
- Preceded by: Mel Frederick
- Succeeded by: Mike Parry

12th Minnesota Senate Minority Leader
- In office July 9, 1997 – January 2007
- Preceded by: Dean Johnson
- Succeeded by: David Senjem

Personal details
- Born: March 9, 1937 (age 89) Rochester, Minnesota
- Party: Republican Party of Minnesota
- Spouse: Janet
- Children: 4
- Education: Winona State College
- Profession: Businessman, salesman, real estate, politician

Richard Day (born March 9, 1937) is an American politician and a former member of the Minnesota Senate who represented District 26, which includes portions of Dodge, Freeborn, Goodhue, Mower, Olmsted, Rice, Steele and Waseca counties in the southeastern part of the state. A Republican, he was first elected in 1990, and was re-elected in 1992, 1996, 2000, 2002 and 2006. Prior to redistricting in 1992 and 2002, he represented the old districts 30 and 28.

== Background ==
Day was born on a farm in Rochester, Minnesota, where he graduated from Rochester High School. He earned a Bachelor of Arts degree in political science and business administration from Winona State College, now Winona State University.

Day lives in Owatonna, Minnesota where he has worked in printing sales, franchise sales, Director of Franchise Sales and Development for Century 21, a real estate broker, and an IBM Salesman, from which he is now retired. He served on the Owatonna City Council from 1976 to 1980, and was a Steele County commissioner from 1980 to 1988. He is married to wife, Janet, and has four children: Dan, Steve, Debbie and Julie. He is Catholic.

== Career in politics ==
=== Minnesota Legislature ===
Prior to his resignation, Day was a member of the senate's Business, Industry and Jobs Committee, Capital Investment Committee, Finance Committee, State and Local Government Operations and Oversight Committee, and Transportation Committee. He also served on the Finance Subcommittee for the Transportation Budget and Policy Division, and on the State and Local Government Operations and Oversight Subcommittee for Gaming. He was minority leader from 1997 to 2007.

=== 2008 congressional race ===
On May 27, 2008, Day entered the Republican primary in Minnesota's 1st congressional district. He lost to Brian J. Davis, a physician who was endorsed by the party, and who went on to lose the general election to the incumbent Congressman, Tim Walz.

=== Senate resignation and Racino promotion ===
On December 8, 2009, Day announced that he was resigning his senate seat on January 8, 2010, to lobby full-time for slots at the state's two horse-racing tracks, with the thought that some of the proceeds generated by the slots could be used for a new Minnesota Vikings football stadium. Long an advocate of race track slots, he led the newly-formed non-profit Racino Now, which was backed by horse owners and business and political insiders. A special election to fill the seat was held on January 26, 2010, and was won by the Republican Mike Parry of Waseca.

== Electoral history ==
- 2006 Race for Minnesota Senate – District 26
  - Dick Day (R) 54.48% (16148 votes)
  - Jeremy Eller (DFL), 45.37% (13450 votes)
  - Write-in, 0.15% (44 votes)
- 2002 Race for Minnesota Senate – District 26
  - Dick Day (R) 59.97% (18444 votes)
  - Jeremy Eller (DFL), 36.33% (11174 votes)
  - John E. Gibson (Green) 3.61%(1111 votes)
  - Write-in, 0.08% (26 votes)
- 2000 Race for Minnesota Senate – District 28
  - Dick Day (R) 63.53% (21407 votes)
  - Fred Knudsen (DFL), 36.47% (12291 votes)
