= Dan Larson (politician) =

American politician

Member of the Minnesota Senate from the 63rd district
- In office 2007–2008

Member of the Minnesota House of Representatives from the 63B district
- In office 2003–2006

Member of the Minnesota House of Representatives from the 40A district
- In office 1999–2000

Personal details
- Born: June 29, 1965 (age 61) Hennepin County, Minnesota, U.S.
- Party: Democratic (DFL)
- Spouse: Sheila
- Children: 2
- Education: Normandale Community College; University of Minnesota

Daniel Gordon Larson (born June 29, 1965) is an American politician in the state of Minnesota. He served in the Minnesota Senate.
