= Loren Solberg =

American politician

Member of the Minnesota House of Representatives from the 3B district
- In office January 4, 1983 – January 3, 2011
- Preceded by: Robert Lemen
- Succeeded by: Carolyn McElfatrick

Personal details
- Born: November 3, 1941 (age 84)
- Party: Minnesota Democratic-Farmer-Labor Party
- Spouse: Joan
- Children: 4
- Education: University of Minnesota Duluth; Bemidji State University; Harvard University
- Profession: Educator, legislator

Loren A. Solberg (born November 3, 1941) is a Minnesota politician and a former member of the Minnesota House of Representatives who represented District 3B, which includes portions of Aitkin and Itasca counties in the northern part of the state. A Democrat, he is also a retired educator.

Solberg was first elected in 1982, and was re-elected every two years until the 2010 general election, when he was unseated by Republican Carolyn McElfatrick. He left office on January 3, 2011.

Solberg was chair the House Ways and Means Committee, and was a member of the Finance, the Rules and Legislative Administration, and the Taxes committees. He also served on the Finance Subcommittee for the Commerce and Labor Subcommittee for the Labor and Consumer Protection Division, and on the Finance Subcommittee for the Capital Investment Finance Division. He previously chaired the Ways and Means Committee from 1993–1998, and chaired the Ethics Committee from 1989-1990. He was an assistant minority leader from 1999-2002.

Solberg graduated from Blackduck High School in Blackduck, then attended the University of Minnesota in Duluth and Bemidji State University in Bemidji, graduating with a B.S. in Mathematics Education in 1965. He later earned his M.S. in Mathematics Education from Bemidji State University in 1972, and his M.P.A. through a Bush Fellowship from Harvard University in 1990. He served as mayor of the town of Bovey from 1970-1982.
