= Dan McElroy =

American politician

Member of the Minnesota House of Representatives from the 36B district
- In office 1995–2002

Chief of Staff to the Governor of Minnesota
- In office 2003–2005
- Governor: Tim Pawlenty

7th Mayor of Burnsville, Minnesota
- In office 1986–1993
- Preceded by: Connie Morrison
- Succeeded by: Ken Wolf
- In office 1993–1995
- Preceded by: Ken Wolf
- Succeeded by: Elizabeth Kautz

Personal details
- Born: July 15, 1948 (age 78) Hennepin County, Minnesota, U.S.
- Party: Republican
- Spouse: Mary
- Education: University of Notre Dame
- Occupation: Consulting

Daniel Clark McElroy (born July 15, 1948) is an American politician and former public official in the state of Minnesota.

== Public sector career ==
McElroy served as Mayor of Burnsville from 1987 to 1995 and on the Burnsville City Council from 1983 to 1987. In the private sector, he spent 23 years running travel agencies and travel agency software and consulting companies.

He served in the Minnesota House of Representatives from 1995 until 2003. He became Chief of Staff to Governor Tim Pawlenty from 2004 through 2005 and Commissioner of Finance in 2003 and 2004. From 2007 to 2010 he was the Commissioner of the Minnesota Department of Employment and Economic Development. He became President and CEO of Hospitality Minnesota in 2011, a coalition that includes the Minnesota Restaurant, Lodging, and Resort & Campground Associations.

== Business career ==
McElroy served as a trustee of the Minnesota State Colleges and Universities, a system with 7 four year colleges and 25 community and technical colleges. He chaired the committees on Finance and Academic and Student Affairs during his tenure as a Trustee. He was the Chair of the Public Facilities Authority. The authority has approximately $3 billion in assets and initiates about $400 million in loans each year. He chaired of the Jobs Skills Partnership Board.

- Chair of the Agriculture and Economic Development Loan Board, a state program that finances job creating business expansions and acts as a conduit bond issuance entity for non-profit organizations. The Board has assets of about $30 million and has completed bond transactions of about $1 billion since 2003.
- Chair of the Minnesota Science and Technology Authority charged with developing and implementing an economic development strategy for science and technology oriented industries, including the commercialization of University research.
- Chair of the Urban Initiative Program, a micro lending facility that provides capital to start up, usually minority owned businesses in low income neighborhoods. The program initiates about 25 loans a year through 13 community partners. Loans range from $5,000 to $100,000.
- Member of the Environmental Quality Board, the Mining and Forestry Sub Cabinets, the Next Generation Energy Board, the Ultra-High-Speed Broadband Task Force and the Continuous Improvement Sub Cabinet.
