= James Clark (Minnesota politician) =

American politician

Member of the Minnesota House of Representatives from the 23A district
- In office 1998–2002

Personal details
- Born: February 21, 1963 (age 63) Scarsdale, New York, U.S.
- Party: Republican
- Spouse: Cara
- Children: 2
- Education: Iona College; Thomas Cooley Law School
- Occupation: Attorney

James T. Clark (born February 21, 1963) is an American politician in the state of Minnesota. He served in the Minnesota House of Representatives.
