= Tony Kinkel =

American politician (born 1960)

Member of the Minnesota Senate from the 4th district
- In office 1999–2002

Member of the Minnesota House of Representatives from the 4B district
- In office 1987–1998

Personal details
- Born: November 15, 1960 (age 65) Hennepin County, Minnesota, U.S.
- Party: Democratic (DFL)
- Children: 1
- Education: University of Minnesota, Duluth; University of Minnesota
- Occupation: teacher

Anthony Gene Kinkel (born November 15, 1960) is an American politician in the state of Minnesota. He served in both the Minnesota House of Representatives and the Minnesota Senate.
