= Doug Stang =

American politician

Member of the Minnesota House of Representatives from the 14B district
- In office 1997–2004

Personal details
- Born: May 4, 1974 (age 52) Stearns County, Minnesota, U.S.
- Party: Republican
- Spouse: Susan
- Children: 2
- Education: College of Saint Benedict and Saint John's University

Douglas Don Stang (born May 4, 1974) is an American politician in the state of Minnesota. He served in the Minnesota House of Representatives from 1997 to 2004 under the Republican Party. Stang lived in Cold Spring, Minnesota with his family and graduated from Rocori High School in Cold Spring, Minnesota. He graduated from College of Saint Benedict and Saint John's University in 1996.
