= Bob Lessard =

American politician

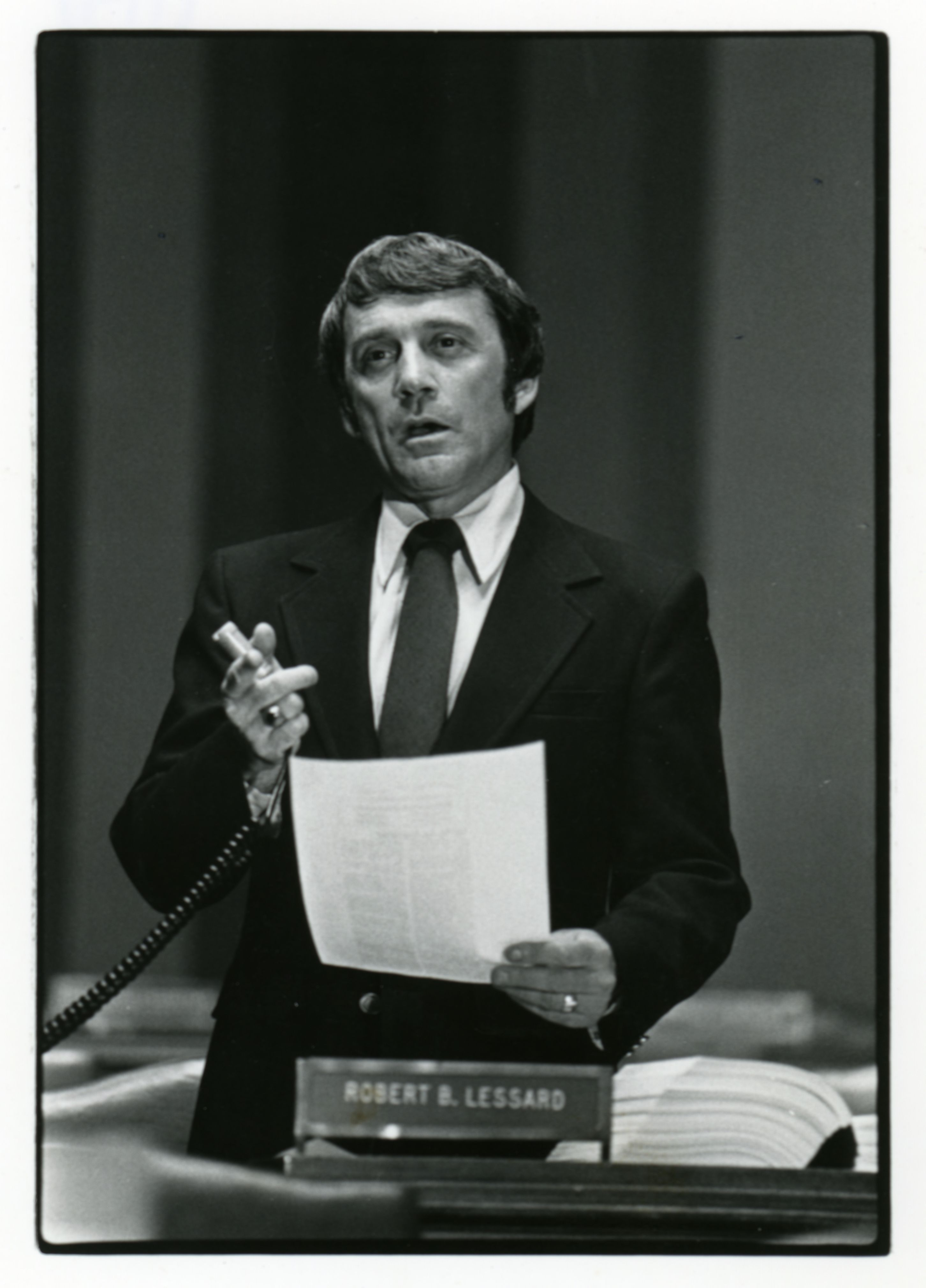

Member of the Minnesota Senate from the 3rd district
- In office January 4, 1977 – January 6, 2003
- Preceded by: Norbert P. Arnold
- Succeeded by: Tom Saxhaug

Personal details
- Born: May 18, 1931 (age 95) International Falls, Minnesota, U.S.
- Party: Republican
- Other political affiliations: Democratic (DFL) Independence
- Occupation: cruise operator

Robert B. Lessard (born May 18, 1931) is an American former politician in the state of Minnesota. He was born in International Falls, Minnesota and was a cruise company operator. Lessard is also a veteran of the Korean War. He was a Minnesota state senator from District 3 from 1977 to 2002.

In 2000 he was re-elected an Independent defeating Ron Dicklich.

He has three children.

Nicknamed "The Old Trapper", Lessard ran for Attorney General of Minnesota in the 2018 election as a Republican. It was noted that Lessard was not an attorney, raised hardly any money and had spent decades as a DFLer. Lessard stated that he was running to protect the state's Clean Water, Land and Legacy Amendment, which he said Republicans were determined to repeal. He came third in the primary election with 63,722 votes (21.7%).
