= Mark Gleason =

American politician

Member of the Minnesota House of Representatives from the 63B district
- In office 1999–2002

Personal details
- Born: November 26, 1953 (age 72) Sauk Centre, Minnesota, U.S.
- Party: Minnesota Democratic–Farmer–Labor Party
- Spouse: Michelle
- Children: two
- Education: University of St. Thomas, William Mitchell College of Law
- Occupation: Tax Attorney/Educator, Accountant

Mark Gleason (born November 26, 1953) is an American politician in the state of Minnesota. He served in the Minnesota House of Representatives.
