= Twyla Ring =

American politician (1937–2022)

Member of the Minnesota Senate from the 18th district
- In office 1999–2002

Personal details
- Born: September 15, 1937 Minneapolis, Minnesota, U.S.
- Died: May 27, 2022 (aged 84) North Branch, Minnesota, U.S.
- Party: Democratic (DFL)
- Spouse: Ardell F. Ring
- Children: 4
- Occupation: Newspaper Editor

Twyla Lorraine Ring (née Holznagel; September 15, 1937 – May 27, 2022) was an American politician in the state of Minnesota. She served in the Minnesota State Senate from 1999 to 2002 and was a Democrat. Ring was born in Minneapolis, Minnesota and graduated from North Community High School, in Minneapolis, in 1955. Ring lived with her husband and family in North Branch, Minnesota and was a newspaper journalist and editor for the ECM Post Review. She also served on the North Branch School Board from 1978 to 1984.
