= Alice Seagren =

American politician (born 1947)

Member of the Minnesota House of Representatives from the 41B district
- In office 2003–2004
- Preceded by: Ken Wolf
- Succeeded by: Neil W. Peterson

Member of the Minnesota House of Representatives from the 41A district
- In office 1993–2002

Personal details
- Born: July 6, 1947 (age 79)
- Party: Republican
- Spouse: Fred
- Children: 2
- Education: Southeast Missouri State University

Alice Maria Seagren (born July 6, 1947) is an American politician in the state of Minnesota. She served in the Minnesota House of Representatives, and as Commissioner of the Minnesota Department of Education from 2004 to 2011.
