= Ken Wolf =

American politician (1937–2024)

Representative Ken Wolf

Member of the Minnesota House of Representatives from the 41B district
- In office 1993–2002
- Preceded by: ?
- Succeeded by: Alice Seagren

Interim Mayor of Burnsville, Minnesota
- In office 1993–1993
- Preceded by: Dan McElroy
- Succeeded by: Dan McElroy

Burnsville City Councilman
- In office 1983–1993

Personal details
- Born: December 30, 1937 Joliet, Illinois, U.S.
- Died: October 13, 2024 (aged 86)
- Party: Independent-Republican; Republican
- Spouse: Mary Wolf
- Children: 3
- Education: University of St. Thomas

Kenneth Albert Wolf (December 30, 1937 – October 13, 2024) was an American politician in the state of Minnesota. He served in the Minnesota House of Representatives for five terms from 1993 to 2002. He had previously served as interim mayor of Burnsville, Minnesota in 1993 while Dan McElroy worked in governor Arne Carlson's administration, and also as Burnsville city councilman from 1983 to 1993. He died on October 13, 2024, at the age of 86.
