= Betty Folliard =

American politician

Member of the Minnesota House of Representatives from the 44A district
- In office January 7, 1997 – January 5, 2003
- Preceded by: Steve Kelley
- Succeeded by: Jim Rhodes (redistricting)

Personal details
- Born: August 31, 1951 (age 75) Madison, Wisconsin, U.S.
- Party: Minnesota Democratic–Farmer–Labor Party
- Spouse: Don Drapeau
- Children: 5
- Education: Wayne State University

Betty Folliard (born August 31, 1951) is an American politician in the state of Minnesota. She served in the Minnesota House of Representatives.
