= Bob Kierlin =

American businessman and politician (1939–2025)

- Born: Robert A. Kierlin; June 1, 1939; Winona, Minnesota U.S.
- Died: February 10, 2025 (aged 85); Winona, Minnesota, U.S.
- Education: University of Minnesota (BSME, MBA)

Robert A. Kierlin (June 1, 1939 – February 10, 2025) was an American businessman, politician, and well respected community member of Winona.

Born in Winona, Minnesota, Kierlin graduated from Cotter High School in Winona. He received his bachelor's in Mechanical Engineering and master's in Business Administration from the University of Minnesota. In 1967, Kierlin helped found Fastenal in Winona, Minnesota. He founded Fastenal along with Steve Slaggie, later to become a director on the board of investors of Fastenal. He also founded the company with Jack Remick, Van Mconnon, and Mike Gostomski. They are known as the "Fastenal Five". He had two daughters Lara and Monique with his first wife, Venezuelan ballet dancer Stefannie Valencia. He provided the initial funding and artwork for the Minnesota Marine Art Museum in Winona. He served in the Minnesota Senate from 1999 to 2007 as a Republican. He died in Winona on February 10, 2025, at the age of 85.

== Notes ==
Minnesota Senate
Preceded by Steven "Steve" Morse	Member of the Minnesota Senate from the 32nd district 1999–2003	Succeeded by Warren Limmer
Preceded by Kenric Scheevel	Member of the Minnesota Senate from the 31st district 2003–2007	Succeeded by Sharon Erickson Ropes
