= Gregory Gray (politician) =

American politician

Member of the Minnesota House of Representatives from the 58B district
- In office January 5, 1999 – January 6, 2003
- Preceded by: Richard H. Jefferson
- Succeeded by: Keith Ellison

Personal details
- Born: March 23, 1954 (age 72) Minneapolis, Minnesota, U.S.
- Party: Minnesota Democratic–Farmer–Labor Party
- Spouse: Renee
- Children: 0
- Education: University of Wisconsin, River Falls, Hamline University School of Law
- Occupation: Attorney

Gregory Gray (born March 23, 1954) is an American politician who served in the Minnesota House of Representatives from district 58B from 1999 to 2003.
