= Donald N. Ziegler =

American politician

Member of the Minnesota Senate from the 26th district
- In office April 6, 1999 – January 2, 2001

Personal details
- Born: March 6, 1949 (age 77) Faribault County, Minnesota, U.S.
- Party: Republican
- Spouse: Joyce
- Children: 2
- Education: Southwest Technical College
- Occupation: farmer, contractor

Donald Nelson Ziegler (born March 6, 1949) was an American politician in the state of Minnesota. He served in the Minnesota State Senate representing Blue Earth, Faribault, Martin, Waseca, and Watonwan Counties from 1999 to 2001, and was elected in a special election. Ziegler was elected on March 30 and sworn in on April 6, 1999.
