= Temple Israel =

Temple Israel may refer to:

== Canada ==
- Temple Israel (Ottawa)

== South Africa ==
- Temple Israel (Cape Town)
- Temple Israel (Johannesburg)

== United States ==
- Temple Israel of Hollywood (Los Angeles, California)
- Temple Israel (Stockton, California)
- Temple Israel (Leadville, Colorado)
- Temple Israel (Westport, Connecticut)
- Temple Israel (Lafayette, Indiana)
- Temple Israel (Paducah, Kentucky)
- Temple Israel (Boston, Massachusetts)
- Temple Israel (West Bloomfield, Michigan)
- Temple Israel (Minneapolis, Minnesota)
- Congregation Temple Israel (Creve Coeur, Missouri)
- Temple Israel of the City of New York
- Temple Israel (Charlotte, North Carolina)
- Temple Israel (Kinston, North Carolina)
- Temple Israel (Columbus, Ohio)
- Temple Israel (Dayton, Ohio)
- Temple Israel (Tulsa, Oklahoma)
- Temple Israel (Memphis, Tennessee)

== See also ==
- List of synagogues named Temple Israel
- Temple of Israel (disambiguation)
