= 2012 United States Senate election in Minnesota =

- November 6, 2012
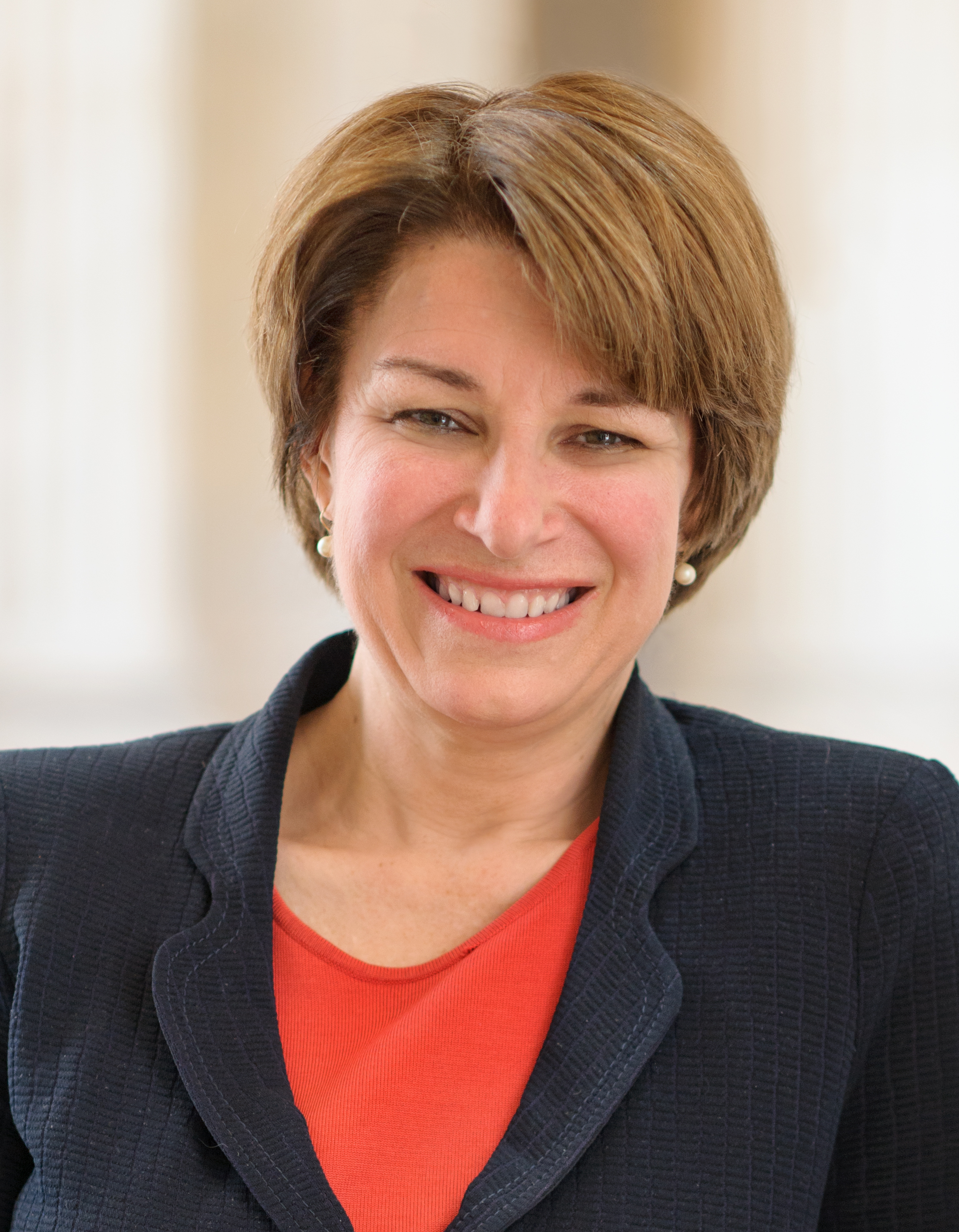

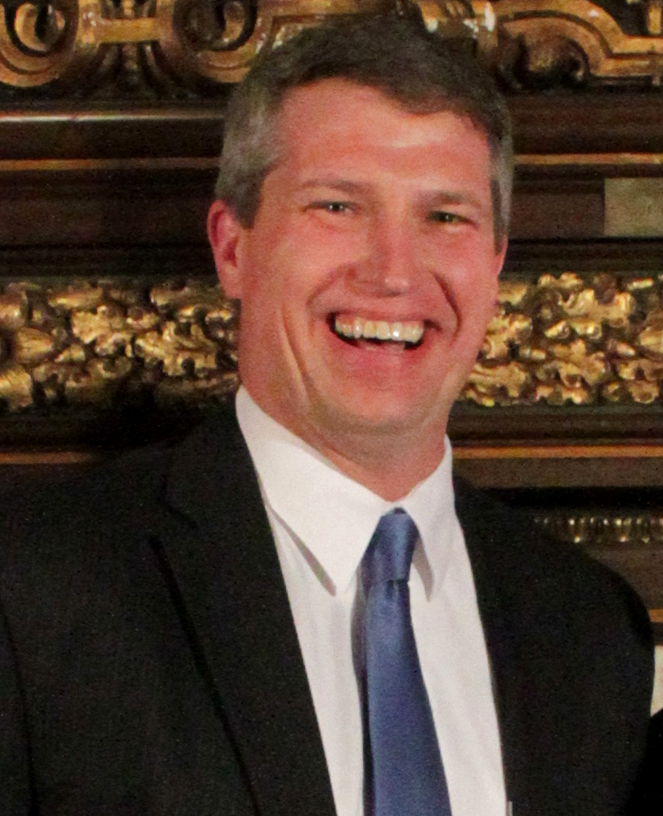
Nominee	Amy Klobuchar	Kurt Bills
Party	Democratic (DFL)	Republican
Popular vote	1,854,595	867,874
Percentage	65.23%	30.53%
- Klobuchar: 40–50% 50–60% 60–70% 70–80% 80–90% >90% Bills: 40–50% 50–60% 60–70% 70–80% 80–90% >90% Tie: 40–50% 50% No votes
U.S. senator before election
Amy Klobuchar
Democratic (DFL)
Elected U.S. Senator
Amy Klobuchar
Democratic (DFL)

The 2012 United States Senate election in Minnesota took place on November 6, 2012, concurrently with the U.S. presidential election, other elections to the United States Senate and House of Representatives, and various state and local elections. Incumbent Democratic–Farmer–Labor U.S. Senator Amy Klobuchar faced Republican State Representative Kurt Bills. Klobuchar was reelected in a landslide, defeating Bills by a greater than 2-to-1 margin and carrying all but two of the state's 87 counties by double digits, only narrowly losing the counties of Pipestone and Rock in the state's southwest corner. This was the first time since 1996 that an incumbent Democratic senator was reelected, and the first time since 1976 that an incumbent Democratic senator was reelected to this seat.

== Background ==
Incumbent Amy Klobuchar was first elected in 2006 to succeed retiring DFL incumbent Mark Dayton. She beat Republican nominee Mark Kennedy, 58% to 38%. Klobuchar served as Minnesota's only senator between January 3 and July 7, 2009, due to the contested results of Minnesota's senatorial election held the previous year, finally decided in favor of DFLer Al Franken.

== DFL primary ==
The Minnesota Democratic–Farmer–Labor Party held its Senate primary on August 14, 2012.

=== Candidates ===
==== Declared ====
- Dick Franson, perennial candidate
- Amy Klobuchar, incumbent U.S. senator
- Jack Shepard, dentist, convicted felon, fugitive and perennial candidate
- Darryl Stanton

=== Results ===
Democratic–Farmer–Labor primary results
Party	Candidate	Votes	%
Democratic (DFL)	Amy Klobuchar (incumbent)	183,702	90.79
Democratic (DFL)	Dick Franson	6,832	3.38
Democratic (DFL)	Jack Shepard	6,638	3.28
Democratic (DFL)	Darryl Stanton	5,160	2.55
Total votes		202,332	100

== Republican primary ==
The Republican Party of Minnesota held its nominating convention in May 2012 and its Senate primary on August 14, 2012.

=== Candidates ===
==== Declared ====
- Kurt Bills, state representative; won May 2012 convention nomination
- David Carlson, former Marine Corps sergeant; candidate in August 2012 primary
- Bob Carney Jr., inventor, independent businessman; finished 2nd in 2010 GOP primary for governor of Minnesota, candidate in August 2012 primary

==== Withdrew ====
- Joe Arwood, St. Bonifacius city councilman; withdrew before May 2012 convention
- Pete Hegseth, executive director of Vets for Freedom; withdrew after May 2012 convention
- Anthony Hernandez, former state senate candidate; withdrew before May 2012 convention to run for Congress against Betty McCollum
- Dan Severson, former state representative; withdrew after May 2012 convention

=== Results ===
Results by county: Bills: 40–50%; 50–60%; 60–70%; Carlson: 40–50%; 50–60%; 60–70%

Republican primary results
Party	Candidate	Votes	%
Republican	Kurt Bills	63,380	51.12
Republican	David Carlson	43,847	35.37
Republican	Bob Carney, Jr.	16,755	13.51
Total votes		123,982	100

== Independence primary ==
=== Campaign ===
The Independence Party of Minnesota did not plan to run a candidate in the general election. Party chairman Mark Jenkins said in November 2011 that he saw the Senate election as "a distraction from having our best and brightest engaged in state legislative races". At the party's convention in June 2012, neither candidate was endorsed. Williams won a majority of the votes and came within two votes of the required 60% needed for the party's endorsement. He proceeded with his Senate campaign but the party focused on state legislative races.

=== Candidates ===
- Glen R. Anderson Menze, accountant and Republican nominee in 2008 and Independence Party nominee in 2010 for the 7th congressional district
- Stephen Williams, farmer and Independence Party endorsed candidate for the U.S. Senate in 2008

=== Results ===
Independence Party primary results
Party	Candidate	Votes	%
Independence	Stephen Williams	3,068	59.67
Independence	Glen R. Anderson Menze	2,074	40.33
Total votes		5,142	100

== General election ==
=== Candidates ===
- Kurt Bills (Republican), state representative
- Michael Cavlan (Minnesota Open Progressives), registered nurse
- Tim Davis (Grassroots), environmental activist
- Amy Klobuchar (DFL), incumbent U.S. senator
- Stephen Williams (Independence), farmer

=== Debates ===
On August 29, Klobuchar and Bills held their second debate at the State Fair, sponsored by MPR News.

Their third debate, on September 16 in Duluth, was about the nation's struggle with deficit spending and unemployment. The audience was assembled by the Duluth Area Chamber of Commerce and Duluth News Tribune.

External links

- "Complete video". Minnesota Public Radio. August 29, 2012. Second debate.
- "Audio". Minnesota Public Radio. September 18, 2012. Third debate.

=== Fundraising ===
Candidate (party)	Receipts	Disbursements	Cash on hand	Debt	Current through
Amy Klobuchar (DFL)	$6,301,413	$2,530,567	$5,393,798	$0	July 25, 2012
Kurt Bills (R)	$394,547	$388,720	$5,841	$0	July 25, 2012
Source: Federal Election Commission

==== Top contributors ====
This section lists the top contributors by employer. These organizations themselves did not donate, but these numbers include donations from their PACs, members, employees, owners, and their immediate families.

Amy Klobuchar	Contribution	Kurt Bills	Contribution
Dorsey & Whitney	$61,100	Liberty PAC	$10,000
Target Corp	$56,050	Craw	$10,000
General Mills	$51,750	Primera Technology	$10,000
U.S. Bancorp	$51,139	Minnesota Limited Pipeline	$7,500
Robins, Kaplan, Miller & Ciresi	$49,150	Ameriprise Financial	$5,000
Medtronic Inc.	$41,025	Bachmann for Congress	$5,000
Toys R Us	$36,500	Exactdrive	$5,000
Leonard, Street & Deinard	$34,350	New Spark Holdings	$5,000
Comcast Corp	$33,623	TACPAC	$5,000
Wells Fargo	$32,400	Twin City Fan Companies	$5,000
Source: OpenSecrets, current through: March 9, 2012

==== Top industries ====
Amy Klobuchar	Contribution	Kurt Bills	Contribution
Lawyers/law firms	$989,929	Leadership PACs	$17,850
Retired	$447,082	Republican/Conservative	$13,750
Leadership PACs	$302,150	Financial institutions	$13,250
Lobbyists	$282,430	Real Estate	$12,550
Financial institutions	$269,033	Retired	$10,350
Entertainment industry	$256,711	Energy industry	$10,250
Women's issues	$196,866	Electronics manufacturing	$10,000
Retail industry	$181,850	Misc. business	$9,450
Commercial banks	$159,139	Manufacturing & distributing	$7,850
Pharmaceuticals/health products	$149,725	Computers/Internet	$7,350
Source: OpenSecrets, current through: March 9, 2012

=== Predictions ===
Source	Ranking	As of
The Cook Political Report	Solid D	November 1, 2012
Sabato's Crystal Ball	Safe D	November 5, 2012
Rothenberg Political Report	Safe D	November 2, 2012
Real Clear Politics	Safe D	November 5, 2012

=== Polling ===
Poll source	Date(s) administered	Sample size	Margin of error	Amy Klobuchar (DFL)	Kurt Bills (R)	Other	Undecided
Public Policy Polling	May 31 – June 3, 2012	973	±3.1%	55%	29%	—	16%
Survey USA	July 17–19, 2012	552	±4.3%	55%	31%	5%	9%
KSTP/Survey USA	September 6–9, 2012	551	±4.2%	55%	34%	—	11%
Public Policy Polling	September 10–11, 2012	824	±3.4%	55%	36%	—	10%
Star Tribune/Mason-Dixon	September 17–19, 2012	800	±3.5%	57%	28%	7%	8%
Public Policy Polling	October 5–8, 2012	937	±3.2%	57%	31%	—	12%
SurveyUSA/KSTP	October 12–14, 2012	550	±4.2%	58%	30%	5%	7%
St. Cloud State U.	October 15–21, 2012	600	±5%	63%	36%	1%	—
Rasmussen Reports	October 21, 2012	500	±4.5%	56%	33%	2%	9%
Star Tribune/Mason-Dixon	October 23–25, 2012	800	±3.5%	65%	22%	—	13%
SurveyUSA	October 26–28, 2012	574	±4.1%	60%	29%	4%	7%
KSTP/SurveyUSA	November 1–3, 2012	556	±4.2%	60%	30%	3%	7%
Public Policy Polling	November 2–3, 2012	1,164	±2.9%	62%	32%	—	6%

Hypothetical polling

Republican primary

Poll source	Date(s) administered	Sample size	Margin of error	Michele Bachmann	Laura Brod	Norm Coleman	Chip Cravaack	Tom Emmer	John Kline	Erik Paulsen	Tim Pawlenty	Other/ Undecided
Public Policy Polling	December 4–5, 2010	387	±5.0%	36%	4%	14%	7%	6%	5%	2%	20%	6%

General election

Poll source	Date(s) administered	Sample size	Margin of error	Amy Klobuchar (DFL)	Joe Arwood (R)	Other	Undecided
Survey USA	November 2–6, 2011	543	±4.3%	56%	22%	—	22%
Public Policy Polling	January 21–22, 2012	1,236	±2.8%	55%	30%	—	15%
Survey USA	January 31 – February 2, 2012	542	±4.2%	59%	28%	—	14%
Public Policy Polling	May 31 – June 3, 2012	973	±3.1%	56%	29%	—	15%

Poll source	Date(s) administered	Sample size	Margin of error	Amy Klobuchar (DFL)	Michele Bachmann (R)	Other	Undecided
Public Policy Polling	December 4–5, 2010	949	±3.2%	56%	39%	—	4%
Public Policy Polling	May 27–30, 2011	1,179	±2.9%	57%	37%	—	5%
Public Policy Polling	January 21–22, 2012	1,236	±2.8%	58%	35%	—	7%

Poll source	Date(s) administered	Sample size	Margin of error	Amy Klobuchar (DFL)	Norm Coleman (R)	Other	Undecided
Public Policy Polling	December 4–5, 2010	949	±3.2%	54%	40%	—	6%
Survey USA	November 2–6, 2011	543	±4.3%	50%	37%	—	14%

Poll source	Date(s) administered	Sample size	Margin of error	Amy Klobuchar (DFL)	Tom Emmer (R)	Other	Undecided
Public Policy Polling	December 4–5, 2010	949	±3.2%	56%	38%	—	6%

Poll source	Date(s) administered	Sample size	Margin of error	Amy Klobuchar (DFL)	Pete Hegseth (R)	Other	Undecided
Public Policy Polling	May 31 – June 3, 2012	973	±3.1%	56%	28%	—	16%

Poll source	Date(s) administered	Sample size	Margin of error	Amy Klobuchar (DFL)	Anthony Hernandez (R)	Other	Undecided
Public Policy Polling	January 21–22, 2012	1,236	±2.8%	55%	29%	—	16%

Poll source	Date(s) administered	Sample size	Margin of error	Amy Klobuchar (DFL)	Erik Paulsen (R)	Other	Undecided
Public Policy Polling	December 4–5, 2010	949	±3.2%	52%	34%	—	14%

Poll source	Date(s) administered	Sample size	Margin of error	Amy Klobuchar (DFL)	Tim Pawlenty (R)	Other	Undecided
Public Policy Polling	December 4–5, 2010	949	±3.2%	53%	43%	—	4%
Public Policy Polling	May 27–30, 2011	1,179	±2.9%	54%	41%	—	5%
Survey USA	November 2–6, 2011	543	±4.3%	49%	37%	—	14%
Public Policy Polling	January 21–22, 2012	1,236	±2.8%	54%	39%	—	7%

Poll source	Date(s) administered	Sample size	Margin of error	Amy Klobuchar (DFL)	Dan Severson (R)	Other	Undecided
Public Policy Polling	May 27–30, 2011	1,179	±2.9%	56%	28%	—	16%
Survey USA	November 2–6, 2011	543	±4.3%	55%	23%	—	22%
Public Policy Polling	January 21–22, 2012	1,236	±2.8%	55%	32%	—	13%
Survey USA	January 31 – February 2, 2012	542	±4.3%	56%	29%	—	15%
Public Policy Polling	May 31 – June 3, 2012	973	±3.1%	55%	27%	—	19%

Poll source	Date(s) administered	Sample size	Margin of error	Amy Klobuchar (DFL)	Dave Thompson (R)	Other	Undecided
Public Policy Polling	May 27–30, 2011	1,179	±2.9%	55%	28%	—	17%

=== Results ===
United States Senate election in Minnesota, 2012
Party	Candidate	Votes	%	±%
Democratic (DFL)	Amy Klobuchar (incumbent)	1,854,595	65.23%	+7.17%
Republican	Kurt Bills	867,974	30.53%	−7.41%
Independence	Stephen Williams	73,539	2.59%	−0.64%
Grassroots	Tim Davis	30,531	1.07%	N/A
Open Progressives	Michael Cavlan	13,986	0.49%	N/A
Write-in		2,582	0.09%	+0.05%
Total votes		2,843,207	100.00%	N/A
Democratic (DFL) hold				

==== Counties that flipped from Republican to Democratic ====
- Carver (largest city: Chaska)
- Redwood (largest city: Redwood Falls)
- Wright (largest city: Otsego)
- Sherburne (largest city: Elk River)
- Otter Tail (largest city: Fergus Falls)
- Wadena (largest city: Wadena)

==== By congressional district ====
Klobuchar won all eight congressional districts, including three held by Republicans.

District	Klobuchar	Bills	Representative
1st	62%	32%	Tim Walz
2nd	62%	34%	John Kline
3rd	63%	34%	Erik Paulsen
4th	71%	25%	Betty McCollum
5th	79%	17%	Keith Ellison
6th	59%	37%	Michele Bachmann
7th	61%	34%	Collin Peterson
8th	65%	31%	Rick Nolan

== See also ==
- 2012 United States Senate elections
- 2012 United States House of Representatives elections in Minnesota
