= The American Jewish World =

Newspaper in Minnesota

- Voices of Minnesota's Jewish Community
- Type: Monthly
- Format: Tabloid
- Owner(s): Minnesota Jewish Media, L.L.C.
- Founder: Samuel Deinard
- Publisher: Mordecai Specktor
- Editor: Mordecai Specktor
- Founded: June 12, 1912; 114 years ago
- Language: English
- Headquarters: Minneapolis
- City: Minnesota
- Country: United States
- ISSN: 0002-9084
- Website: ajwnews.com

The American Jewish World is a newspaper published in Minnesota. It began as a 16-page weekly on June 12, 1912, as a means of uniting Jews from Minnesota behind the cause of Zionism. In 1964 the newspaper changed to a five-column tabloid format. In 2009 publication changed to biweekly, and as subscriptions and advertising revenue continued to fall it switched to a monthly schedule from March 2019.

== History ==
The paper was founded by Samuel Deinard, an Eastern European Jew who arrived in Minneapolis in 1901 to serve as the rabbi of Reform Judaism Temple Shaarei Tov. He had first launched a newspaper titled Jewish Progress in 1904 and Judean in 1905 but these both soon failed. He launched another weekly paper Scribe in 1907 which included a four-page Yiddish supplement. This too failed, and in 1912 he launched Jewish Weekly which lasted six months. It relaunched as American Jewish World (AJW) in 1915.

In 1921, Deinard died suddenly age 48. The assistant editor Frisch. Rabbi C. David Matt of the Adath Jeshurun Congregation took over as publisher, maintaining the role for over 60 years.
