= Deinard =

Deinard is a Jewish surname. Notable people with this name include:

- Ephraim Deinard (1846–1930), American bibliophile
- Samuel Deinard (1873–1921), American rabbi
