= Kurt Bills =

American politician (born 1970)

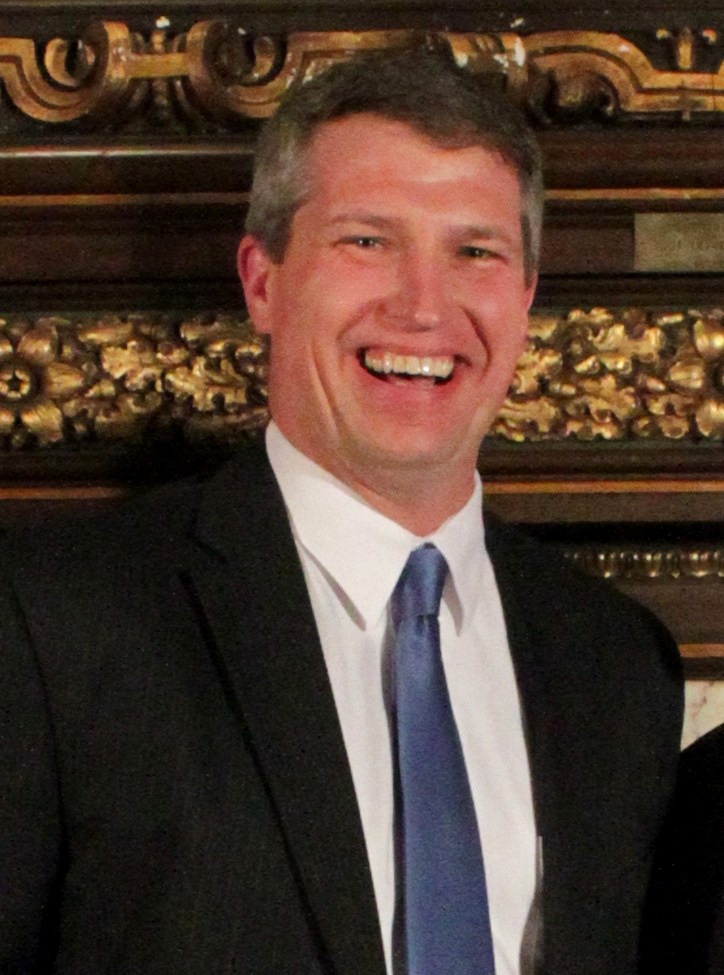

Member of the Minnesota House of Representatives from the 37B district
- In office January 4, 2011 – January 7, 2013
- Preceded by: Phil Sterner
- Succeeded by: Nolan West

Personal details
- Born: Kurt Patrick Bills; January 8, 1970 (age 56) Sauk Prairie, Wisconsin, U.S.
- Party: Republican
- Spouse: Cindy Bills
- Children: 4
- Education: Winona State University (BA, MA)

Kurt Patrick Bills (born January 8, 1970) is an American educator and former politician. He has taught and coached high school since 1994. He served on the Rosemount City Council from 2008 to 2010. He then served in the Minnesota House of Representatives from 2011 to 2012. He was the Republican nominee for United States Senate in Minnesota in 2012, losing in a landslide to Democratic incumbent Amy Klobuchar.

== Early life, education, and early career ==
Bills attended Winona State University earning a B.S. in secondary social studies education, B.A. in US history, and M.A. in education.

Since 1996, Bills has worked as a secondary social studies teacher at Rosemount High School, teaching courses in Microeconomics, Macroeconomics and American Government & Politics. He is also the former head coach of the wrestling team.

== Early political life ==
In 2008, Bills was elected to the Rosemount City Council from a field of 26 candidates.

Bills cited his students for his reason to enter the political arena. In Bills words: "In 2007, when studying fiscal policy, national debt, deficits, and entitlements, a student asked why solutions are not sought if we know that we have structural problems. I explained how politicians make self-interested choices just like the rest of us. After a short discussion about party structure, media and election cycle politics, one of my more politically active students, in a mixture of depression, anger and frustration asked, 'Mr. Bills, what are we supposed to do about this?'"

== Minnesota House of Representatives ==
=== 2010 election ===
Bills ran for the Minnesota House of Representatives in 2010 in District 37B. He defeated incumbent Democratic State Representative Phil Sterner, 58%–42%.

=== Tenure ===
Bills's district included Rosemount and parts of Apple Valley, in the southeastern Twin Cities metropolitan area.

Bills was a chief author of bills supporting scholarships for early high school graduation; reduction of pay for legislators if the budget were not balanced by the end of the legislative session; and making gold and silver legal tender in Minnesota.

On May 21, 2011, Bills joined the House Republican Majority in voting for a constitutional amendment to constitutionally ban marriage for same-sex couples. He was also among those legislators during the July 2011 Minnesota government shutdown who declined their pay.

=== Committee assignments ===
- House Committee on Capital Investment
- House Committee on Education/Finance
- House Committee on Taxes

== 2012 U.S. Senate election ==
In March 2012, Bills announced his candidacy for the U.S. Senate seat held by Amy Klobuchar. He was endorsed by GOP presidential contender Ron Paul, U.S. senator Rand Paul and Minnesota House speaker Kurt Zellers.

At the state Republican convention in May 2012, Bills received the Senate endorsement on the second ballot. He won the Republican primary on August 14, 2012.

Klobuchar defeated Bills in the general election on November 6, 2012. Bills carried only two counties (Rock County and Pipestone County) while Klobuchar swept the rest of the state, winning with 65% of the vote.

== Post-election professional life ==
In March 2013, Forbes.com added Bills as a contributor to its website.

In July 2013, H&H Partners Consulting Corporation named Bills to its board of directors as Executive Chairman and a Senior Advisor.

== Personal life ==
Bills and his wife, Cindy, own a licensed home daycare that she operates. They reside in Rosemount with their four children.

Party political offices
Preceded by Mark Kennedy	Republican nominee for U.S. Senator from Minnesota (Class 1); 2012	Succeeded by Jim Newberger
