= 2018 United States Senate election in Minnesota =

- November 6, 2018
- Turnout: 63.89%
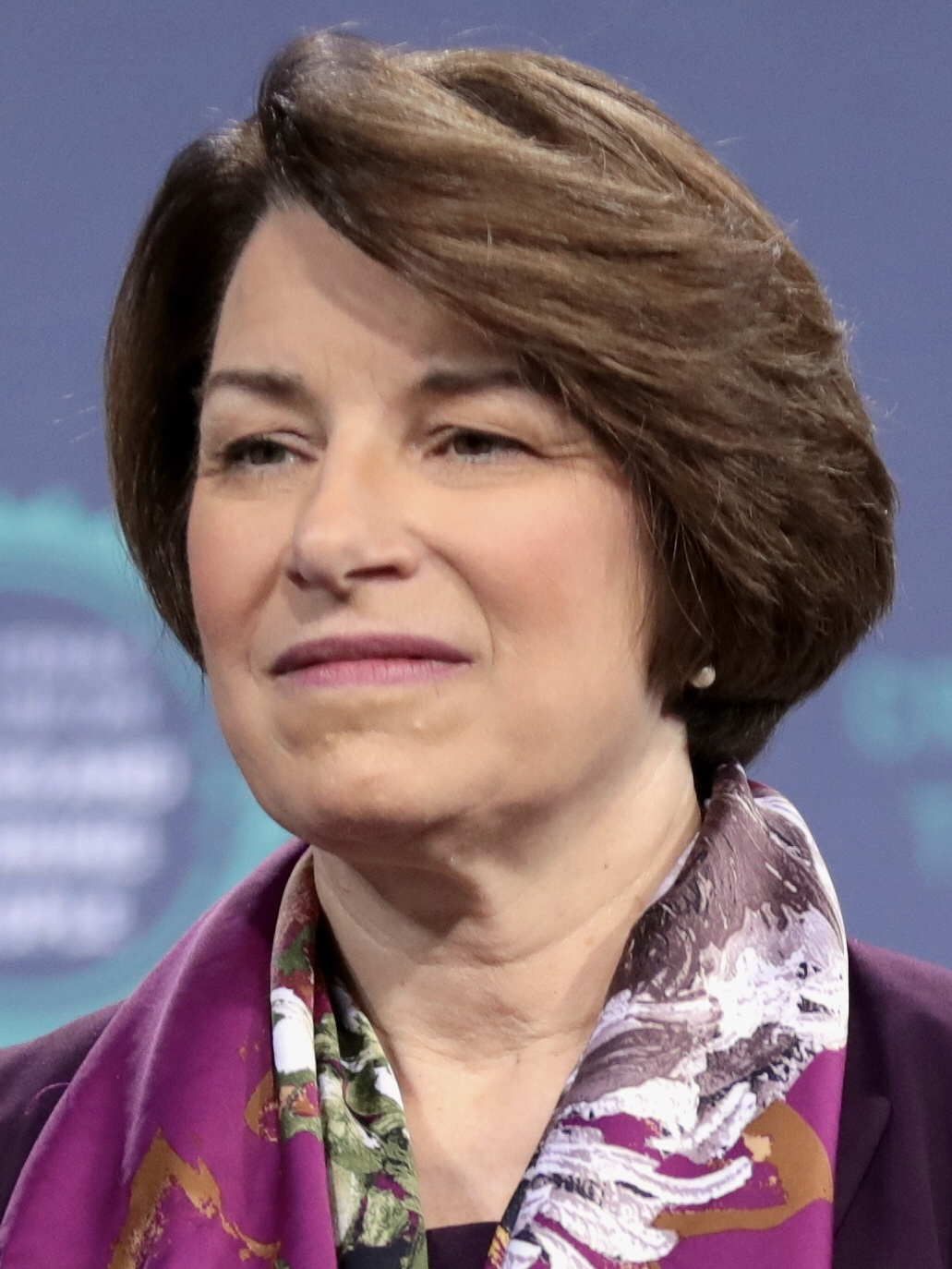

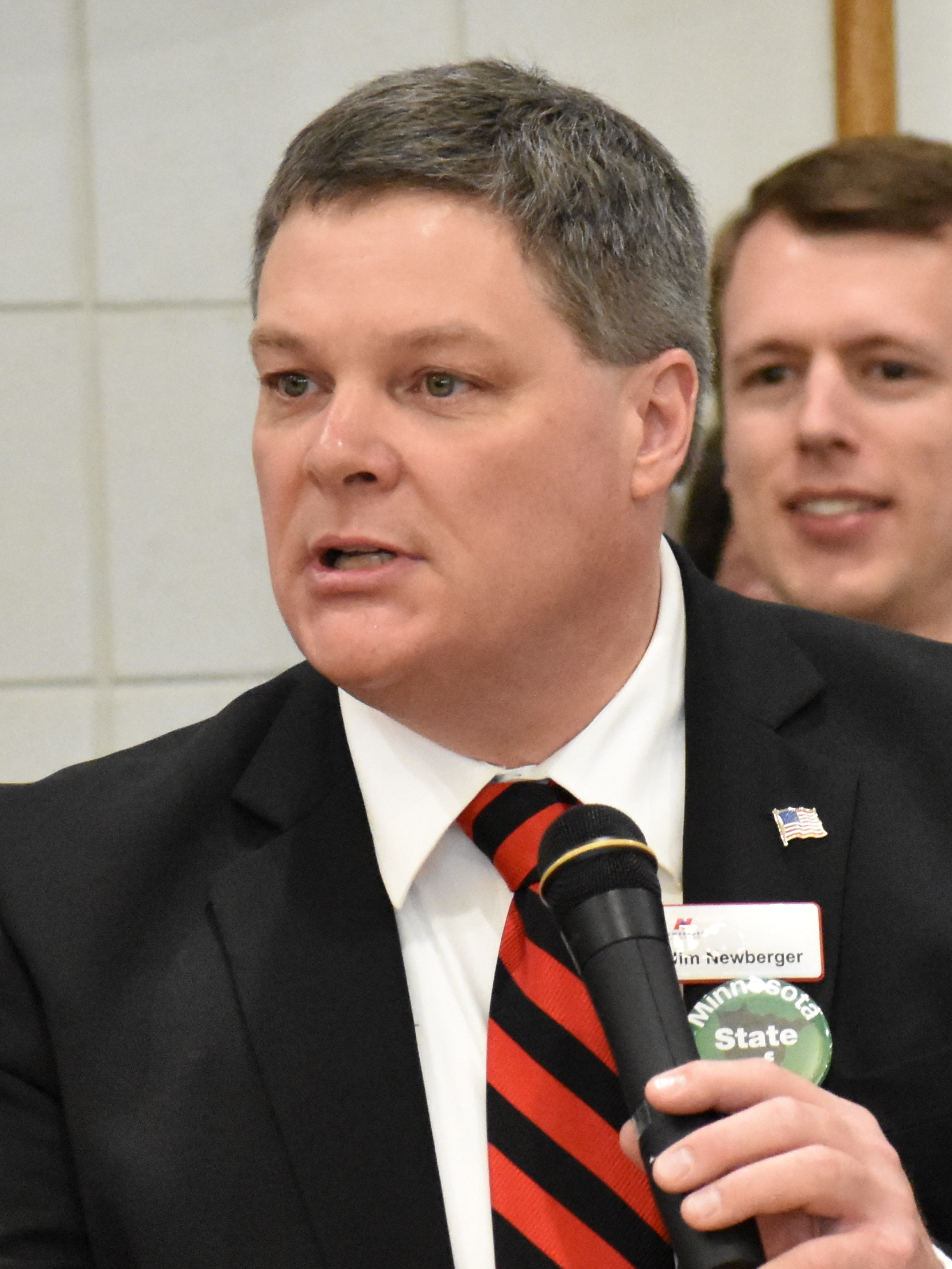
Nominee	Amy Klobuchar	Jim Newberger
Party	Democratic (DFL)	Republican
Popular vote	1,566,174	940,437
Percentage	60.31%	36.21%
- Klobuchar: 40–50% 50–60% 60–70% 70–80% 80–90% >90% Newberger: 20–30% 30–40% 40–50% 50–60% 60–70% 70–80% 80–90% >90% Tie: No vote
U.S. senator before election
Amy Klobuchar
Democratic (DFL)
Elected U.S. Senator
Amy Klobuchar
Democratic (DFL)

The 2018 United States Senate election in Minnesota took place on November 6, 2018, to elect a United States senator from Minnesota. Incumbent Democratic–Farmer–Labor U.S. Senator Amy Klobuchar was reelected in a landslide, defeating Republican state House of Representatives member Jim Newberger. This election was held alongside a special election for Minnesota's other Senate seat, which was held by Al Franken until he resigned in January 2018. U.S. House elections, a gubernatorial election, State House elections, and other elections were also held.

The candidate filing deadline was June 5, 2018, and the primary election was held on August 14, 2018. This is the last time that a Democratic candidate won a majority of Minnesota's counties in a statewide election.

== Democratic-Farmer-Labor primary ==
=== Candidates ===
==== Nominated ====
- Amy Klobuchar, incumbent U.S. senator

==== Eliminated in primary ====
- Steve Carlson
- Stephen A. Emery
- David R. Groves
- Leonard J. Richards

=== Endorsements ===
Amy Klobuchar

Organizations

- Communications Workers of America
- EMILY's List
- End Citizens United
- Feminist Majority Political Action Committee
- League of Conservation Voters
- National Committee to Preserve Social Security and Medicare
- Natural Resources Defense Council Action Fund
- Population Connection
- United Automobile Workers

=== Results ===
Democratic–Farmer–Labor Party primary results
Party	Candidate	Votes	%
Democratic (DFL)	Amy Klobuchar (incumbent)	557,306	95.70%
Democratic (DFL)	Steve Carlson	9,934	1.71%
Democratic (DFL)	Stephen Emery	7,047	1.21%
Democratic (DFL)	David Groves	4,511	0.77%
Democratic (DFL)	Leonard Richards	3,552	0.61%
Total votes		582,350	100%

== Republican primary ==
=== Candidates ===
==== Nominated ====
- Jim Newberger, state representative (Minnesota GOP convention endorsed)

==== Eliminated in primary ====
- Merrill Anderson, past candidate for mayor of Minneapolis, past candidate for governor of Minnesota
- Rae Hart Anderson
- Rocky De La Fuente, 2016 Reform Party presidential nominee and perennial candidate

==== Declined ====
- Tim Pawlenty, former governor of Minnesota (ran for governor)

=== Endorsements ===
Jim Newberger

State legislators

- Representative Tony Albright, 55B, vice chair of the Health and Human Services Finance Committee
- Senator Bruce Anderson, SD 29
- Representative Paul Anderson, 12B, chair of the Agriculture Policy Committee
- Representative Jeff Backer, 12A, vice chair of the Agriculture Policy Committee
- Representative Cal Bahr, 31B
- Representative Peggy Bennett, 27A, vice chair of the Education Finance Committee
- Senator Dave Brown, SD15, retired
- Representative Drew Christensen, 56A
- Representative Steve Drazkowski, 21B, chair of the Property Tax Committee
- Representative Sondra Erickson, 15A, chair of the Education Innovation Policy Committee
- Representative Dan Fabian, 1A, chair of the Environment and Natural Resources Committee
- Representative Patrick Garofalo, 58B, chair of the Growth and Energy Affordibility Committee
- Representative Steve Green, 2B
- Representative Glenn Gruenhagen, 18B
- Representative Bob Gunther, 23A, chair of the Legacy Committee
- Senator Dan Hall, SD 56, chair of the Local Government Finance Committee
- Representative Josh Heintzeman, 10A, vice chair of the Environment and Natural Resources Committee
- Representative Jerry Hertaus, 33A, vice chair of the Property Tax Committee
- Representative Jeff Howe, 13A
- Senator Bill Ingebrigtsen, SD 8, chair of the Environment and Natural Resources Finance Committee
- Representative Tony Jurgens, 54B
- Representative Ron Kresha, 9B, Majority Whip
- Representative Sandy Layman, 5B
- Representative Kathy Lohmer, 39B
- Representative Bob Loonan, 55A
- Representative Eric Lucero, 30B
- Representative Dale Lueck, 10B, vice chair of the Mining, Forestry and Tourism SubCommittee
- Senator Andrew Mathews, SD15, vice chair, Energy and Utilities Committee
- Representative Anne Neu, 32B
- Representative Marion O'Neill, 29B, chair of Employee Relations Subcommittee
- Representative Joyce Peppin, 34A, Majority Leader
- Representative Roz Peterson, 56B
- Representative John Poston, 9A.
- Representative Cindy Pugh, 33B, vice chair of the Government Operations and Elections Committee
- Representative Duane Quam, 25A
- Senator Julie Rosen, SD23, Finance Committee chair
- Representative Dennis Smith, 34B, vice chair of the Civil Law and Data Practices Committee
- Representative Mark Uglem, 36A, vice chair of the Capital Investment Committee
- Representative Nick Zerwas, 30A

Individuals

- Mike Lindell, CEO of My Pillow

Organizations

- Chinese American Alliance Action

Newspapers

- Duluth News Tribune

=== Results ===
Results by county Newberger: 50–60%; 60–70%; 70–80%; 80–90%

Results by congressional district Newberger: 60–70%; 70–80%

Republican Party primary results
Party	Candidate	Votes	%
Republican	Jim Newberger	201,531	69.50%
Republican	Merrill Anderson	45,492	15.69%
Republican	Rae Hart Anderson	25,883	8.93%
Republican	Roque "Rocky" de la Fuente	17,051	5.88%
Total votes		289,957	100%

== Minor parties and independents ==
=== Candidates ===
- Paula M. Overby (Green Party)
- Dennis Schuller (Legal Marijuana Now Party)

== General election ==
=== Predictions ===
Source	Ranking	As of
The Cook Political Report	Safe D	October 26, 2018
Inside Elections	Safe D	November 1, 2018
Sabato's Crystal Ball	Safe D	November 5, 2018
Fox News	Likely D	July 9, 2018
CNN	Safe D	July 12, 2018
RealClearPolitics	Safe D	November 5, 2018

=== Debates ===
On August 24, MPR News hosted a debate between Amy Klobuchar and Jim Newberger at the Minnesota State Fair.

=== Fundraising ===
Campaign finance reports as of October 17, 2018
Candidate (party)	Total receipts	Total disbursements	Cash on hand
Amy Klobuchar (DFL)	$10,139,499	$7,700,359	$5,086,325
Jim Newberger (R)	$210,846	$191,815	$19,030
Source: Federal Election Commission

=== Polling ===
Poll source	Date(s) administered	Sample size	Margin of error	Amy Klobuchar (DFL)	Jim Newberger (R)	Paula Overby (G)	Dennis Schuller (LMN)	Other	Undecided
Change Research	November 2–4, 2018	953	–	55%	40%	2%	3%	–	–
Research Co.	November 1–3, 2018	450	± 4.6%	53%	33%	–	–	2%	12%
SurveyUSA	October 29–31, 2018	600	± 5.3%	57%	34%	–	–	1%	7%
St. Cloud State University	October 15–30, 2018	420	–	54%	28%	–	–	–	
Mason-Dixon	October 15–17, 2018	800	± 3.5%	56%	33%	2%	2%	–	8%
Change Research	October 12–13, 2018	1,413	–	50%	41%	2%	5%	–	2%
Marist College	September 30 – October 4, 2018	637 LV	± 4.9%	60%	32%	4%	–	<1%	4%
Marist College	September 30 – October 4, 2018	637 LV	± 4.9%	63%	33%	–	–	<1%	4%
Marist College	September 30 – October 4, 2018	860 RV	± 4.2%	59%	32%	5%	–	<1%	5%
Marist College	September 30 – October 4, 2018	860 RV	± 4.2%	62%	33%	–	–	<1%	5%
Mason-Dixon	September 10–12, 2018	800	± 3.5%	60%	30%	1%	3%	–	6%
SurveyUSA	September 6–8, 2018	574	± 4.9%	53%	38%	–	–	2%	8%
Suffolk University	August 17–20, 2018	500	± 4.4%	54%	34%	1%	1%	–	11%
Emerson College	August 8–11, 2018	500	± 4.6%	50%	26%	–	–	–	24%
BK Strategies	June 24–25, 2018	1,574	± 2.5%	57%	37%	–	–	–	6%

Hypothetical polling

Poll source	Date(s) administered	Sample size	Margin of error	Generic Democrat	Generic Republican	Undecided
BK Strategies (R)	June 24–25, 2018	1,574	± 2.5%	49%	42%	9%

=== Results ===
Klobuchar won the election by a margin of 24.10%. She carried a clear majority of the state's 87 counties, won every congressional district, and had the biggest statewide margin of any statewide candidate in Minnesota in 2018. Klobuchar ran up huge margins in the state's population centers and trounced Newberger in the counties encompassing the Minneapolis-St. Paul area. As in her 2012 victory, she also won many rural counties. Klobuchar was sworn in for a third term on January 3, 2019.

United States Senate election in Minnesota, 2018
Party	Candidate	Votes	%	±%
Democratic (DFL)	Amy Klobuchar (incumbent)	1,566,174	60.31%	−4.92%
Republican	Jim Newberger	940,437	36.21%	+5.68%
Legal Marijuana Now	Dennis Schuller	66,236	2.55%	N/A
Green	Paula Overby	23,101	0.89%	N/A
Write-in		931	0.04%	-0.05%
Total votes		2,596,879	100.00%	N/A
Democratic (DFL) hold				

==== By county ====
County	Amy Klobuchar DFL		Jim Newberger Republican		Various candidates Other parties		Margin		Total votes cast
County	#	%	#	%	#	%	#	%	Total votes cast
Aitkin	4,118	50.3%	3,808	46.5%	261	3.2%	310	3.8%	8,187
Anoka	87,756	55.0%	65,707	41.2%	6,165	3.9%	22,049	13.8%	159,628
Becker	6,699	45.4%	7,520	50.9%	551	3.7%	-821	-5.5%	14,770
Beltrami	9,711	53.9%	7,562	42.0%	736	4.1%	2,149	11.9%	18,009
Benton	7,131	44.3%	8,290	51.5%	667	4.1%	-1,159	-7.2%	16,088
Big Stone	1,368	52.7%	1,127	43.4%	99	3.8%	241	9.3%	2,594
Blue Earth	16,776	59.6%	9,984	35.5%	1,378	4.9%	6,792	24.1%	28,138
Brown	5,614	47.5%	5,816	49.2%	401	3.5%	-202	-1.7%	11,831
Carlton	10,200	62.2%	5,682	34.6%	523	3.1%	4,518	27.6%	16,405
Carver	27,168	53.2%	22,540	44.1%	1,346	2.6%	4,628	9.1%	51,054
Cass	6,243	44.5%	7,332	52.3%	449	3.1%	-1,089	-7.8%	14,024
Chippewa	2,925	52.9%	2,422	43.8%	185	3.3%	503	9.1%	5,532
Chisago	12,138	47.0%	12,663	49.0%	1,038	3.9%	-525	-2.0%	25,839
Clay	14,950	61.3%	8,480	34.7%	973	4.0%	6,470	26.6%	24,403
Clearwater	1,302	37.3%	2,080	59.7%	105	3.1%	-778	-22.4%	3,487
Cook	2,178	67.7%	911	28.3%	126	3.9%	1,267	39.4%	3,215
Cottonwood	2,413	47.8%	2,488	49.3%	146	2.9%	-75	-1.5%	5,047
Crow Wing	14,206	45.2%	16,132	51.3%	1,098	3.4%	-1,926	-6.1%	31,436
Dakota	127,016	61.3%	73,462	35.4%	6,846	3.3%	53,554	25.9%	207,324
Dodge	4,278	46.8%	4,527	49.6%	328	3.5%	-249	-2.8%	9,133
Douglas	8,504	47.0%	9,113	50.4%	467	2.5%	-609	-3.4%	18,084
Faribault	3,031	47.5%	3,103	48.7%	243	3.8%	-72	-1.2%	6,377
Fillmore	5,128	52.7%	4,263	43.8%	341	3.6%	865	8.9%	9,732
Freeborn	7,675	54.8%	5,779	41.3%	547	3.9%	1,896	13.5%	14,001
Goodhue	12,379	53.4%	9,940	42.9%	858	3.7%	2,439	10.5%	23,177
Grant	1,637	52.1%	1,402	44.6%	101	3.2%	235	7.5%	3,140
Hennepin	459,729	73.0%	149,297	23.7%	20,508	3.3%	310,432	49.3%	629,534
Houston	4,425	49.4%	4,149	46.4%	375	4.2%	276	3.0%	8,949
Hubbard	4,494	44.3%	5,312	52.4%	339	3.3%	-818	-8.1%	10,145
Isanti	7,440	42.7%	9,226	53.0%	754	4.3%	-1,786	-10.3%	17,420
Itasca	11,585	53.5%	9,203	42.5%	867	4.0%	2,382	11.0%	21,655
Jackson	2,174	46.4%	2,341	50.0%	168	3.6%	-167	-3.6%	4,683
Kanabec	3,138	46.7%	3,363	50.1%	218	3.2%	-225	-3.4%	6,719
Kandiyohi	9,378	50.2%	8,596	46.0%	695	3.7%	782	4.2%	18,669
Kittson	1,325	56.0%	943	39.9%	97	4.1%	382	16.1%	2,365
Koochiching	2,886	54.9%	2,238	42.6%	132	2.5%	648	12.3%	5,256
Lac qui Parle	1,866	55.5%	1,404	41.8%	120	2.7%	462	13.7%	3,362
Lake	3,539	59.8%	2,196	37.1%	181	3.0%	1,343	22.7%	5,916
Lake of the Woods	729	39.4%	1,072	57.9%	51	2.8%	-343	-18.5%	1,852
Le Sueur	6,444	50.0%	5,979	46.4%	457	3.5%	465	3.6%	12,880
Lincoln	1,164	47.9%	1,213	50.0%	51	2.1%	-49	-2.1%	2,428
Lyon	4,973	49.8%	4,700	47.1%	313	3.1%	273	2.7%	9,986
McLeod	6,825	45.6%	7,684	51.3%	456	3.0%	-859	-5.7%	14,965
Mahnomen	1,098	57.1%	708	36.8%	116	6.0%	390	20.3%	1,922
Marshall	1,864	45.4%	2,120	51.6%	126	3.0%	-256	-6.2%	4,110
Martin	3,770	43.1%	4,664	53.4%	305	3.4%	-894	-10.3%	8,739
Meeker	4,677	45.2%	5,363	51.9%	298	2.9%	-686	-6.7%	10,338
Mille Lacs	4,771	44.5%	5,492	51.2%	467	4.4%	-721	-6.7%	10,730
Morrison	5,246	36.6%	8,678	60.6%	399	2.7%	-3,432	-24.0%	14,323
Mower	8,396	57.1%	5,705	38.8%	592	4.0%	2,691	18.3%	14,693
Murray	1,925	46.6%	2,070	50.1%	136	3.3%	-145	-3.5%	4,131
Nicollet	9,632	61.2%	5,517	35.1%	580	3.7%	4,115	26.1%	15,729
Nobles	3,185	45.4%	3,523	50.2%	303	4.4%	-338	-4.8%	7,011
Norman	1,588	58.4%	1,049	38.6%	82	3.0%	539	19.8%	2,719
Olmsted	41,769	58.6%	27,291	38.3%	2,186	3.1%	14,478	20.3%	71,246
Otter Tail	12,002	43.7%	14,688	53.5%	776	2.8%	-2,686	-9.8%	27,466
Pennington	2,582	48.1%	2,573	47.9%	216	4.0%	9	0.2%	5,371
Pine	5,648	48.7%	5,528	47.7%	423	3.7%	120	1.0%	11,599
Pipestone	1,321	35.5%	2,266	60.8%	138	3.8%	-945	-25.3%	3,725
Polk	5,729	48.2%	5,785	48.7%	363	3.0%	-56	-0.5%	11,877
Pope	2,851	52.3%	2,443	44.8%	158	2.9%	408	7.5%	5,452
Ramsey	182,445	74.3%	53,101	21.6%	10,024	4.2%	129,344	52.7%	245,570
Red Lake	900	54.0%	709	42.5%	59	3.6%	191	11.5%	1,668
Redwood	2,688	43.2%	3,334	53.6%	199	3.2%	-646	-10.4%	6,221
Renville	3,194	50.7%	2,888	45.8%	217	3.4%	306	4.9%	6,299
Rice	16,881	59.2%	10,604	37.2%	1,015	3.5%	6,277	22.0%	28,500
Rock	1,452	38.5%	2,217	58.8%	101	2.7%	-765	-20.3%	3,770
Roseau	2,517	38.9%	3,771	58.2%	186	2.9%	-1,254	-19.3%	6,474
St. Louis	66,056	66.2%	30,293	30.3%	3,465	3.4%	35,763	35.9%	99,814
Scott	34,624	52.2%	29,308	44.2%	2,342	3.5%	5,316	8.0%	66,274
Sherburne	16,491	41.9%	21,437	54.5%	1,419	3.6%	-4,946	-12.6%	39,347
Sibley	3,050	46.3%	3,337	50.7%	200	3.4%	-287	-4.4%	6,587
Stearns	31,970	48.4%	31,821	48.1%	2,326	3.5%	149	0.3%	66,117
Steele	8,192	50.1%	7,490	45.8%	669	4.1%	702	4.3%	16,351
Stevens	2,290	52.1%	1,969	44.8%	135	3.1%	321	7.3%	4,394
Swift	2,147	53.0%	1,793	44.3%	111	2.7%	354	8.7%	4,051
Todd	3,863	40.1%	5,516	57.2%	257	2.6%	-1,653	-17.1%	9,636
Traverse	825	53.9%	665	43.5%	40	2.7%	160	10.4%	1,530
Wabasha	4,961	49.6%	4,695	46.9%	350	3.5%	266	2.7%	10,006
Wadena	2,044	36.8%	3,379	60.9%	127	2.2%	-1,335	-24.1%	5,550
Waseca	4,035	49.5%	3,872	47.5%	248	3.0%	163	2.0%	8,155
Washington	78,364	60.2%	47,785	36.7%	3,939	3.0%	30,579	23.5%	130,088
Watonwan	2,200	53.3%	1,819	44.1%	108	2.6%	381	9.2%	4,127
Wilkin	1,251	48.4%	1,243	48.0%	93	3.5%	8	0.4%	2,587
Winona	12,090	56.5%	8,236	38.5%	1,061	4.9%	3,854	18.0%	21,387
Wright	26,821	45.1%	30,572	51.4%	2,049	3.4%	-3,751	-6.3%	59,442
Yellow Medicine	2,111	48.9%	2,071	48.0%	132	3.0%	40	0.9%	4,314
Totals	1,566,174	60.3%	940,437	36.2%	90,268	3.5%	625,737	24.1%	2,596,879

Counties that flipped from Democratic to Republican

- Morrison (largest city: Little Falls)
- Todd (largest city: Long Prairie)
- Jackson (largest city: Jackson)
- Faribault (largest city: Blue Earth)
- Nobles (largest city: Worthington)
- Martin (largest city: Fairmont)
- Cottonwood (largest city: Windom)
- Dodge (largest city: Kasson)
- Murray (largest city: Slayton)
- Lincoln (largest city: Tyler)
- Redwood (largest city: Redwood Falls)
- Brown (largest city: New Ulm)
- McLeod (largest city: Hutchinson)
- Meeker (largest city: Litchfield)
- Wright (largest city: Otsego)
- Sibley (largest city: Gaylord)
- Benton (largest city: Sauk Rapids)
- Sherburne (largest city: Elk River)
- Isanti (largest city: Cambridge)
- Chisago (largest city: North Branch)
- Mille Lacs (largest city: Princeton)
- Kanabec (largest city: Mora)
- Marshall (largest city: Warren)
- Lake of the Woods (largest city: Baudette)
- Roseau (largest city: Roseau)
- Clearwater (largest city: Bagley)
- Polk (largest city: East Grand Forks)
- Becker (largest city: Detroit Lakes)
- Douglas (largest city: Alexandria)
- Otter Tail (largest city: Fergus Falls)
- Cass (largest city: Lake Shore)
- Crow Wing (largest city: Brainerd)
- Hubbard (largest city: Park Rapids)
- Wadena (largest city: Wadena)

==== By congressional district ====
Klobuchar won all eight congressional districts, including three that elected Republicans.

District	Klobuchar	Newberger	Representative
1st	54%	42%	Tim Walz (115th Congress)
1st	54%	42%	Jim Hagedorn (116th Congress)
2nd	59%	38%	Jason Lewis (115th Congress)
2nd	59%	38%	Angie Craig (116th Congress)
3rd	63%	35%	Erik Paulsen (115th Congress)
3rd	63%	35%	Dean Phillips (116th Congress)
4th	71%	25%	Betty McCollum
5th	81%	15%	Keith Ellison (115th Congress)
5th	81%	15%	Ilhan Omar (116th Congress)
6th	48.3%	48.2%	Tom Emmer
7th	48.4%	48.3%	Collin Peterson
8th	54%	43%	Rick Nolan (115th Congress)
8th	54%	43%	Pete Stauber (116th Congress)

== Analysis ==
=== Voter demographics ===
Edison Research exit poll
Demographic subgroup	Klobuchar	Newberger	No answer	% of voters
Gender
Men	54	45	1	46
Women	67	32	1	54
Age
18–24 years old	79	19	2	6
25–29 years old	60	39	1	5
30–39 years old	63	35	2	12
40–49 years old	57	42	1	13
50–64 years old	61	38	1	29
65 and older	60	39	1	35
Race
White	59	40	1	89
Black	86	12	2	5
Latino	N/A	N/A	N/A	3
Asian	N/A	N/A	N/A	2
Other	N/A	N/A	N/A	2
Race by gender
White men	52	47	1	40
White women	65	34	1	49
Black men	N/A	N/A	N/A	3
Black women	N/A	N/A	N/A	2
Latino men	N/A	N/A	N/A	1
Latino women	N/A	N/A	N/A	1
Others	N/A	N/A	N/A	4
Education
High school or less	59	40	1	17
Some college education	55	43	2	23
Associate degree	54	44	2	17
Bachelor's degree	66	34	N/A	26
Advanced degree	75	25	N/A	16
Education and race
White college graduates	68	31	1	38
White no college degree	53	46	1	51
Non-white college graduates	79	20	1	4
Non-white no college degree	82	17	1	7
Whites by education and gender
White women with college degrees	74	25	1	21
White women without college degrees	59	40	1	28
White men with college degrees	61	39	N/A	17
White men without college degrees	46	53	1	23
Non-whites	80	18	2	11
Income
Under $30,000	67	28	5	14
$30,000–49,999	63	35	2	20
$50,000–99,999	55	44	1	36
$100,000–199,999	64	36	N/A	23
Over $200,000	N/A	N/A	N/A	7
Party ID
Democrats	98	2	N/A	39
Republicans	18	81	1	32
Independents	62	36	2	29
Party by gender
Democratic men	96	4	N/A	14
Democratic women	99	1	N/A	25
Republican men	16	84	N/A	15
Republican women	20	78	2	17
Independent men	56	42	2	16
Independent women	69	29	2	13
Ideology
Liberals	96	3	1	27
Moderates	76	23	1	39
Conservatives	17	82	1	33
Marital status
Married	55	44	1	67
Unmarried	69	28	3	33
Gender by marital status
Married men	51	47	2	31
Married women	58	42	N/A	36
Unmarried men	59	38	3	15
Unmarried women	79	19	2	18
First-time midterm election voter
Yes	59	40	1	13
No	64	35	1	87
Most important issue facing the country
Health care	78	20	2	50
Immigration	29	70	1	22
Economy	37	62	1	18
Gun policy	N/A	N/A	N/A	7
Area type
Urban	73	26	1	40
Suburban	58	41	1	32
Rural	49	49	2	28
Source: CNN

== See also ==
- 2018 Minnesota elections
