= Shane Mekeland =

American politician (born 1969)

Member of the Minnesota House of Representatives from the 27A district
- Incumbent
- Assumed office January 8, 2019
- Preceded by: Jim Newberger

Personal details
- Born: July 28, 1969 (age 56)
- Party: Republican
- Spouse: Angela
- Children: 1
- Occupation: General contractor; Business owner; Legislator
- Website: Government website Campaign website

Shane Mekeland (/ˈmɛk.lənd/); born July 28, 1969) is an American politician serving in the Minnesota House of Representatives since 2019. A member of the Republican Party of Minnesota, Mekeland represents District 27A in central Minnesota, which includes the cities of Big Lake, Becker, and surrounding areas of Sherburne County.

== Early life and career ==
Mekeland was a convenience store manager and owner for 20 years. He is a general contractor.

== Minnesota House of Representatives ==
Mekeland was elected to the Minnesota House of Representatives in 2018 and has been reelected every two years since. He first ran after three-term incumbent Jim Newberger announced he would not seek reelection in order to run in the 2018 U.S. Senate election.

Mekeland serves on the Climate and Energy Finance and Policy and Labor and Industry Finance and Policy Committees.

=== Political positions ===
Mekeland has called for an audit of the 2020 election. On December 10, 2022, he signed on to a letter calling on Texas Attorney General Ken Paxton to include Minnesota in his unsuccessful lawsuit to invalidate election results in other states, citing "illegal voting practices" in the state.

In 2020, Mekeland wrote a letter to the Sherburne County Board of Commissioners asking it to designate the county a "Second Amendment sanctuary".

Mekeland opposed bipartisan legislation to increase worker protection laws for meatpacking workers, saying that existing laws were adequate to deal with injuries and other issues and additional regulations would lead to increased consolidation. He criticized cities for charging high fees on building permits to pay for other government services.

In 2025, Mekeland led sponsorship of a bill to designate messenger RNA (mRNA) treatments, which include several COVID-19 vaccines, "weapons of mass destruction", and make possessing or administering them a crime punishable by up to 20 years in prison. The bill was drafted by a Florida-based hypnotist and conspiracy theorist who believes that mRNA treatments are "nanoparticle injections" that amount to "biological and technological weapons of mass destruction".

== Electoral history ==
2018 Minnesota State House - District 15B
Party	Candidate	Votes	%
Republican	Shane Mekeland	10,699	59.41
Democratic (DFL)	Karla Scapanski	6,161	34.21
Independent	Myron Arthur Wilson	1,137	6.31
Write-in		11	0.06
Total votes		18,008	100.00
Republican hold			

2020 Minnesota State House - District 15B
Party	Candidate	Votes	%
Republican	Shane Mekeland (incumbent)	17,616	70.55
Democratic (DFL)	Ron Thiessen	5,898	23.62
Veterans Party - Minnesota	Myron Arthur Wilson	1,425	5.71
Write-in		32	0.13
Total votes		24,971	100.00
Republican hold			

2022 Minnesota State House - District 29A
Party	Candidate	Votes	%
Republican	Shane Mekeland (incumbent)	14,798	70.68
Democratic (DFL)	Sherri Leyda	6,115	29.21
Write-in		24	0.11
Total votes		20,937	100.00
Republican hold			

== Personal life ==
Mekeland resides in Clear Lake, Minnesota, with his partner, Angela, and has one child.

In October 2018, Mekeland was attacked in a restaurant in St. George Township and suffered a concussion. He said he believed the attack was politically motivated, and posted online that "the media and the likes of Maxine Waters, Hillary, and Eric Holder" were responsible for driving the behavior.
