= Temple of Israel =

Temple of Israel may refer to the following synagogues:

- Temple of Israel (Amsterdam, New York), a former synagogue, now church
- Temple of Israel Synagogue (Rockaway Beach, New York)
- Temple of Israel (Wilmington, North Carolina)

== See also ==
- Temple Israel (disambiguation)
