= List of synagogues named Temple Israel =

Numerous synagogues in North America have the name of Temple Israel.

Name	City	State/Province	Country	Founded	Movement	Website
Temple Israel	Ottawa	Ontario	Canada	1966	Reform	templeisraelottawa.ca
Temple Israel	Alameda	California	United States	1920	Reform	templeisraelalameda.org
Temple Israel of Hollywood	Hollywood	California	United States	1926	Reform	tioh.org
Temple Israel	Stockton	California	United States	1855	Reform	templeisraelstockton.com
Temple Israel	Leadville	Colorado	United States	1884	Reform	jewishleadville.org
Temple Israel	Westport	Connecticut	United States	1948	Reform	tiwestport.org
Temple Israel	Miami	Florida	United States	1922	Reform	templeisrael.net
Temple Israel	Lafayette	Indiana	United States	1849	Reform	templeisraelwlaf.org
Temple Israel	Valparaiso	Indiana	United States	1920	Reform	templeisrael.info
Temple Israel	Paducah	Kentucky	United States	1871	Reform	templeisraelky.com
Temple Israel	Boston	Massachusetts	United States	1854	Reform	tisrael.org
Temple Israel	West Bloomfield	Michigan	United States	1941	Reform	temple-israel.org
Temple Israel	Minneapolis	Minnesota	United States	1878	Reform	templeisrael.com
Congregation Temple Israel	St. Louis	Missouri	United States	1886	Reform	ti-stl.org
Temple Israel	Omaha	Nebraska	United States	1871	Reform	templeisraelomaha.com
Temple Israel	Portsmouth	New Hampshire	United States	1905	Conservative	templeisraelnh.org
Temple Israel	Ridgewood	New Jersey	United States	1952	Conservative	synagogue.org
Temple Israel	Albany	New York	United States	1949	Conservative	www.tialbany.org
Temple Israel of the City of New York	Manhattan	New York	United States	1873	Reform	templeisraelnyc.org
Temple Israel	Staten Island	New York	United States	1948	Reform	templeisraelsi.com
Temple Israel of Northern Westchester	Croton-on-Hudson	New York	United States	1947	Reform	tinw.org/
Temple Israel	Charlotte	North Carolina	United States	1895	Conservative	www.templeisraelnc.org
Temple Israel	Kinston	North Carolina	United States	1903	Reform	synagoguekinstonnc.org
Temple Israel	Akron	Ohio	United States	1865	Reform	templeisraelakron.org
Temple Israel	Canton	Ohio	United States	1885	Reform	templeisraelcanton.org
Temple Israel	Columbus	Ohio	United States	1846/1851	Reform	templeisrael.org
Temple Israel	Dayton	Ohio	United States	1850	Reform	tidayton.org
Temple Israel	Tulsa	Oklahoma	United States	1914	Reform	templetulsa.com
Temple Israel of Lehighton	Lehighton	Pennsylvania	United States	1924	Unaffiliated	templeisraeloflehighton.com
Temple Israel of Scranton	Scranton	Pennsylvania	United States	1921	Conservative	templeisraelscranton.org
Temple Israel of Wilkes-Barre	Wilkes-Barre	Pennsylvania	United States	1922	Conservative	templewb.org
Temple Israel	Memphis	Tennessee	United States	1853	Reform	timemphis.org
Temple Israel	Charleston	West Virginia	United States	1873	Reform	templeisraelwv.org
