= Tom Hackbarth =

American politician

Member of the Minnesota House of Representatives from the 31B district 50A (1995–1997, 1999–2003), 48A (2003–2013)
- In office January 5, 1999 – January 2, 2017
- Preceded by: Kathleen Sekhon
- Succeeded by: Cal Bahr
- In office January 3, 1995 – January 6, 1997
- Preceded by: Kathleen Sekhon
- Succeeded by: Kathleen Sekhon

Personal details
- Born: December 28, 1951 (age 74) Minneapolis, Minnesota
- Party: Republican Party of Minnesota
- Children: 3
- Education: North Hennepin Community College
- Occupation: salesman, firefighter

Thomas M. Hackbarth (born December 28, 1951) is a Minnesota politician and former member of the Minnesota House of Representatives. A member of the Republican Party of Minnesota, he represented District 31B, which included portions of Anoka County in the northern Twin Cities metropolitan area.

== Early life, education, and career ==
Hackbarth graduated from Anoka High School in Anoka, and then attended North Hennepin Community College in Brooklyn Park. He has been a firefighter for the Oak Grove Volunteer Fire Department since 1983. He is also a retired salesman in the automotive parts industry.

== Political career ==
Hackbarth was first elected in 1994 and served one term. He ran again in 1998, was elected, and has been re-elected every two years since then. Before the 2002 legislative redistricting, he represented the old District 50A. He chaired the Environment and Natural Resources Committee from 2003-2006.

Hackbarth was slated to chair the House Environment, Energy and Natural Resources Committee for the legislative session beginning in 2011. The House Republican Party caucus reneged on the chairmanship after an incident on Tuesday, November 16, 2010. On that date, Hackbarth was questioned and briefly detained by police who found him with a loaded gun, for which he had a permit to carry, acting suspiciously in a Planned Parenthood parking lot in St. Paul, Minnesota. Hackbarth stated he was looking for a girlfriend, he had recently met through an online dating site and was unaware that he had parked at a Planned Parenthood Facility.

Hackbarth is a key proponent of building a new stadium for the Minnesota Vikings. On October 5, 2009, he announced a renewal of the effort to build a Vikings stadium without increasing taxes on Minnesota citizens. The plan proposed a constitutional amendment authorizing the use of revenue from the addition of slot machines at existing Twin Cities area horse racing facilities for Vikings stadium funding.

Hackbarth lost the primary election for the Republican nomination for re-election in 2016, losing to Cal Bahr.
