= Michelle Benson =

American accountant and politician, Republican member of the Minnesota State Senate

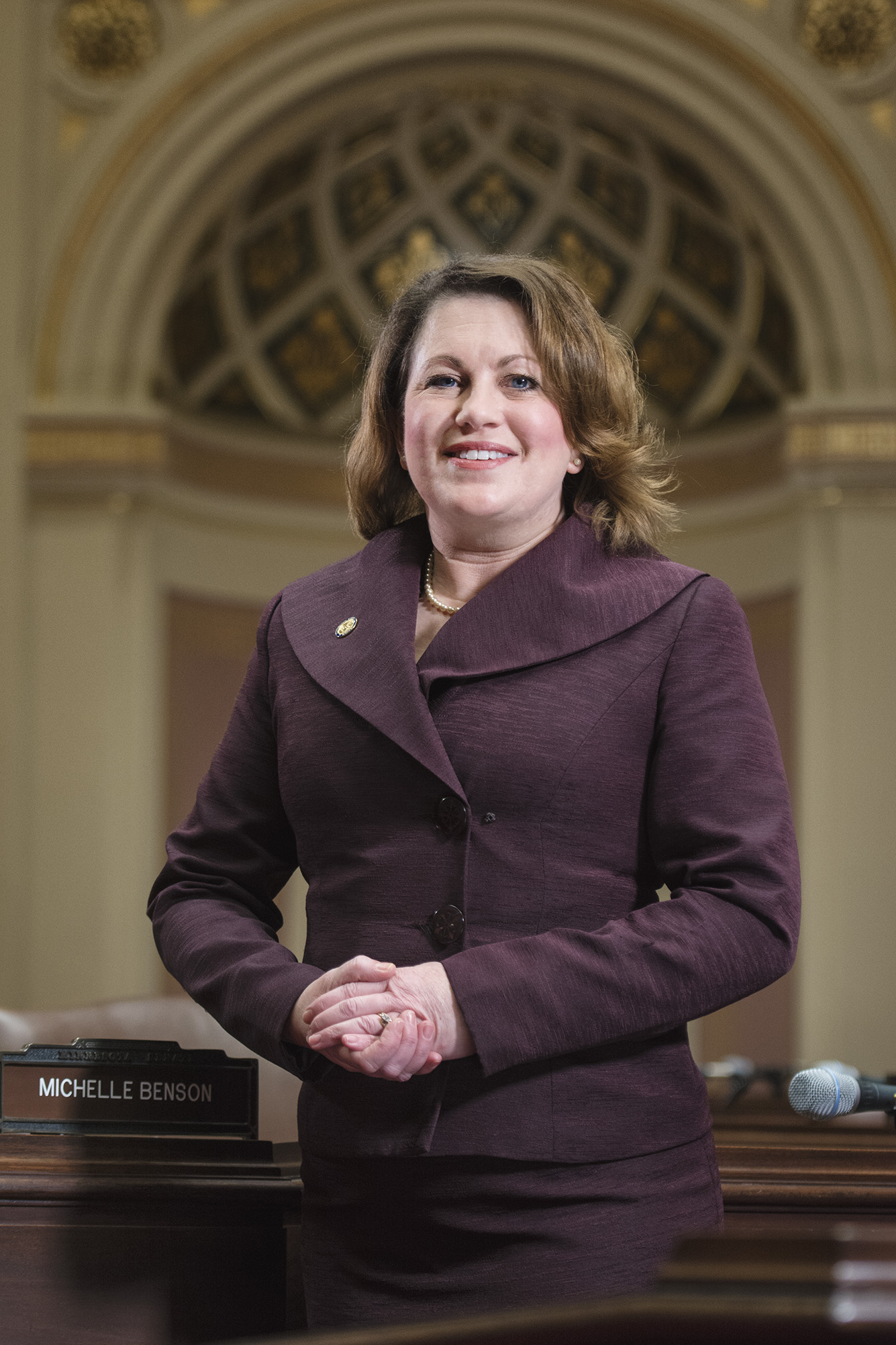
- Benson in 2016

Member of the Minnesota Senate
- In office January 4, 2011 – January 3, 2023
- Preceded by: Debbie Johnson
- Succeeded by: Cal Bahr
- Constituency: 49th (2011–2013); 31st (2013–2023)

Personal details
- Born: Michelle Rae Collins; September 11, 1968 (age 58)
- Party: Republican
- Spouse: Craig Benson
- Children: 3
- Education: St. Catherine University (BA); University of St. Thomas (MBA)
- Occupation: Accountant, consultant

Michelle R. Benson (born September 11, 1968) is an American accountant, politician, and Republican member of the Minnesota Senate. She represents District 31, which includes portions of Anoka, Isanti and Sherburne counties in the northern Twin Cities metropolitan area. Benson is the Deputy Majority Leader of the Minnesota Senate.

== Early life, education, and career ==
Benson was raised on a farm near Murdock, Minnesota, graduating from Kerkhoven-Murdock-Sunburg High School. In 1991, Benson graduated from St. Catherine University in Saint Paul with a Bachelor of Arts in chemistry. In 1996, Benson received a Master of Business Administration from the University of St. Thomas. Benson, a certified public accountant, previously worked as an auditor and consultant at Deloitte & Touche and as executive director of a non-profit cybersecurity organization.

== Minnesota Senate ==
In 2010, Benson challenged incumbent Debbie Johnson for the Republican nomination. Benson won the nomination and subsequently won the election. Benson was re-elected handily in 2012 and 2016. She currently serves as chair of the Senate Health and Human Services Finance and Policy Committee and is a deputy majority leader.

In 2015, she co-sponsored legislation that would allow businesses to refuse to provide services for same-sex couples.

In 2021, Michelle Benson called into question the ways in which the Minnesota government spent federal COVID-19 relief, dubbing the spending wasteful.

On August 31, 2021, Benson announced she was running for Governor of Minnesota. In her announcement, Benson promised to fight back against “radical, leftist policies” regarding the COVID-19 pandemic, and promised to deliver a "safer, better, and stronger" Minnesota. She later suspended her campaign in April 2022.

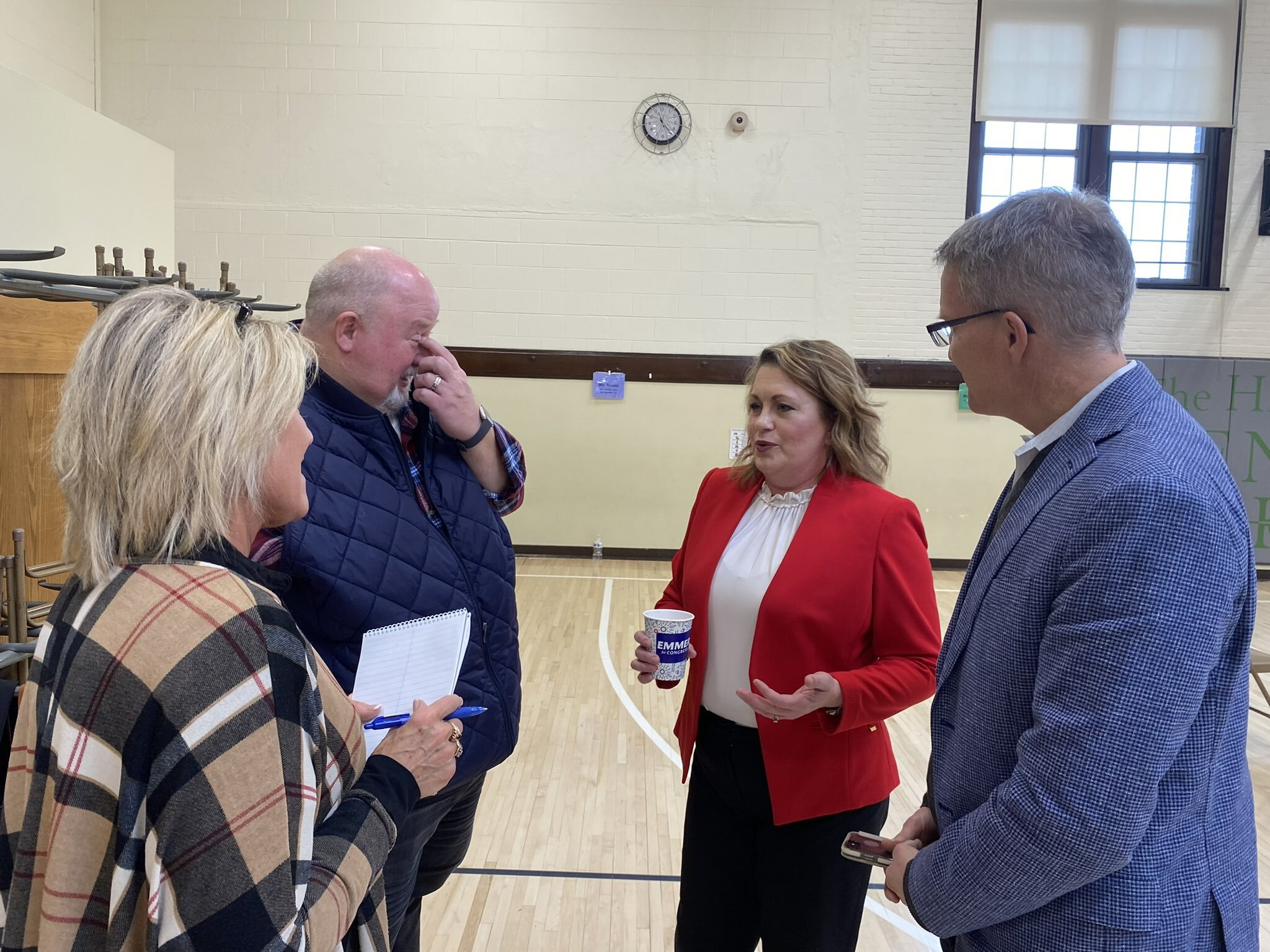
Senator Benson campaigning for Governor of Minnesota.

== Personal life ==
Benson has been a Boy Scout and Cub Scout leader, an administrator for a local Montessori school, and a member of the local chambers of commerce. Benson and her husband, Craig, live in Ham Lake with their three children.
