= Jim Newberger =

American politician (born 1964)

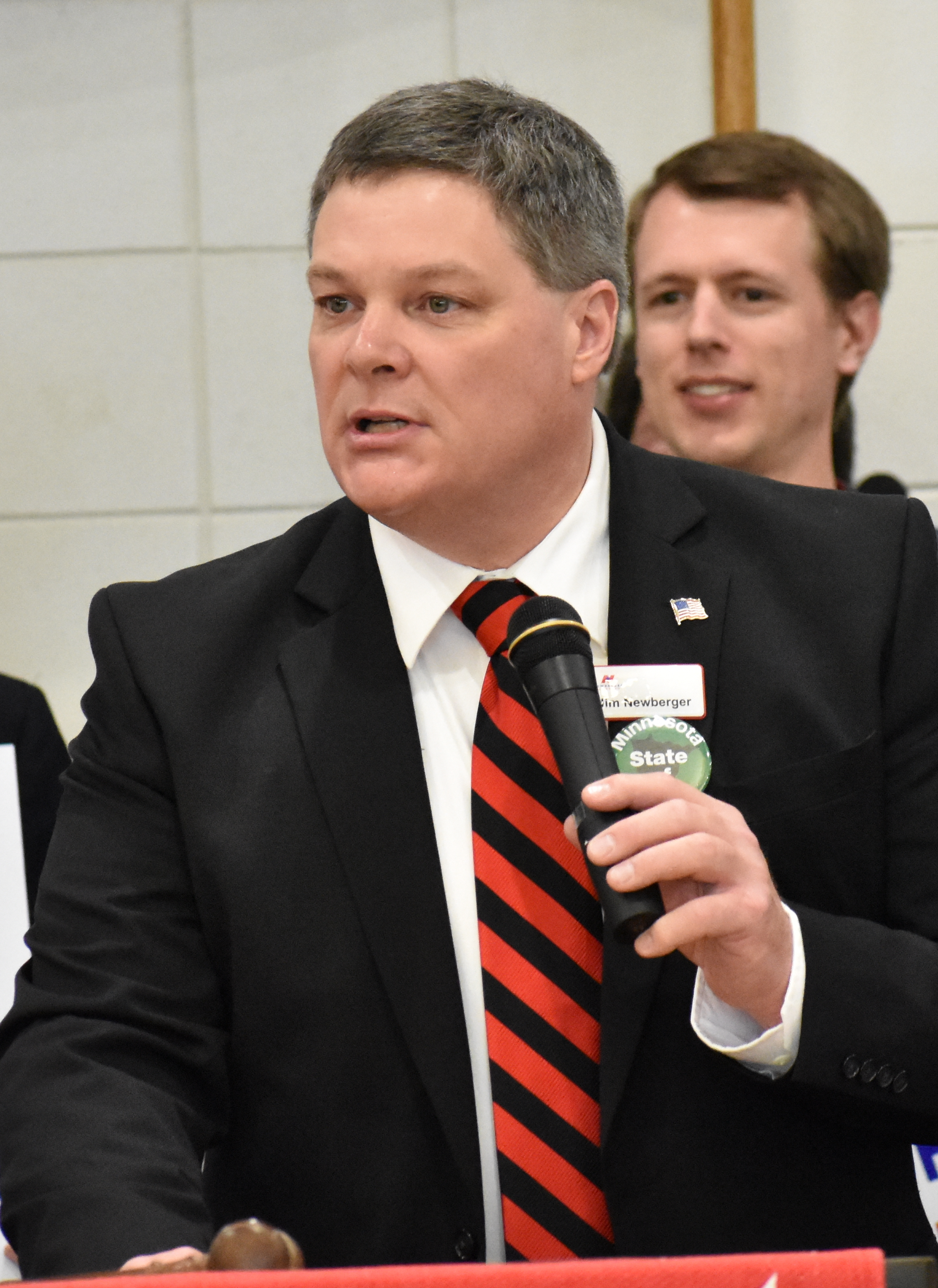

Member of the Minnesota House of Representatives from the 15B district
- In office January 8, 2013 – January 7, 2019
- Preceded by: Redistricted
- Succeeded by: Shane Mekeland

Personal details
- Born: March 6, 1964 (age 62)
- Party: Republican
- Spouse: Michele
- Children: 3
- Education: St. Cloud State University (BA)

James Newberger (born March 6, 1964) is an American politician who served as a member of the Minnesota House of Representatives from 2013 to 2019. A member of the Republican Party, Newberger represented District 15B in central Minnesota, which includes the city of Big Lake and parts of Sherburne County. He was the Republican nominee for the United States Senate in 2018, losing in a landslide to incumbent Democrat Amy Klobuchar.

== Education ==
Newberger attended St. Cloud State University, graduating with a B.A. in political science and mass communications.

== Minnesota House of Representatives ==
Newberger was elected to the Minnesota House of Representatives in 2012. He served three terms from 2013 to 2019 and served on the Jobs and Energy (Vice Chair), Environment and Natural Resources, Civil Law, Transportation Policy, and Public Safety Committees.

On September 10, 2018, Newberger was riding on a trailer/float in the Carver County parade as a candidate for the U.S. Senate. The tractor pulling the float malfunctioned, causing Secretary of State candidate John Howe to be thrown to the pavement. Howe's campaign manager, Tim Droogsma, also fell off the tractor and was run over by the 2,800-pound trailer. Both men suffered injuries. Newberger, a retired paramedic, immediately responded and rendered aid to Howe and Droogsma until ambulances could arrive.

On January 23, 2017, Newberger immediately responded when Governor Mark Dayton collapsed during the State of the State Address. Newberger and Representative Jeff Backer rendered aid to Dayton.

Newberger was reprimanded by a judge for writing to encourage reconsideration of a judgment (worth roughly $250,000) against a donor to Newberger. Newberger defended his action as advocating for his constituents but said he would not act in a similar manner again. Minnesota judges may not consider communications made to them regarding cases without the presence and knowledge of both lawyers.

== Electoral history ==
2016 General Election for Minnesota's 15B House of Representatives District
Party	Candidate	Votes	%
Republican	Jim Newberger (Incumbent)	14,949	68.88
Democratic (DFL)	Thomas Pauley	6,732	31.02
Other	Write-ins	22	0.10
Total votes		21,703	100

2014 General Election for Minnesota's 15B House of Representatives District
Party	Candidate	Votes	%
Republican	Jim Newberger (Incumbent)	9,166	63.93
Democratic (DFL)	Brian Johnson	5,154	35.95
Other	Write-ins	17	0.12
Total votes		14,337	100

2012 General Election for Minnesota's 15B House of Representatives District
Party	Candidate	Votes	%
Republican	Jim Newberger	11,414	57.77
Democratic (DFL)	Brian Johnson	8,316	42.09
Other	Write-ins	26	0.13
Total votes		19,756	100

2018 General Election for U.S. Senate
Party	Candidate	Votes	%
Republican	Jim Newberger	940,437	36.21%
Democratic (DFL)	Amy Klobuchar (Incumbent)	1,566,174	60.31%

== Personal life ==
Newberger is married to Michele Newberger. They have three daughters and reside in Becker, Minnesota.

Party political offices
Preceded by Kurt Bills	Republican nominee for U.S. Senator from Minnesota (Class 1); 2018	Succeeded by Royce White
