= Debbie Johnson (politician) =

American politician

Member of the Minnesota Senate from the 49th district
- In office January 3, 2001 – January 4, 2011
- Preceded by: Paula Hanson
- Succeeded by: Michelle Benson

Personal details
- Born: October 1, 1957 (age 69)
- Party: Republican
- Children: 2
- Occupation: legislator

Debbie J. Johnson (born October 1, 1957) is an American politician and a former member of the Minnesota Senate who represented District 49, which includes portions of Anoka County in the northern Twin Cities metropolitan area. A Republican, she was first elected to the Senate in 2000, and was re-elected in 2002 and 2006. Prior to the 2002 redistricting, she represented the old District 50.

Johnson was a member of the Senate's Capital Investment Committee, the Commerce and Consumer Protection Committee, the Health, Housing and Family Security Committee, and the Taxes Committee. Her special legislative concerns included education, commerce, jobs, transportation, and taxes.

On February 13, 2010, Johnson lost her bid for endorsement to challenger Michelle Benson, also of Ham Lake, at the party's senate district convention. She later announced that she would not seek a fourth term.

Johnson is the parent of two children.
