= Frank Birnbaum =

American classical composer

William Franklin "Frank" Birnbaum (1922–2005) was a well-known 20th century chazzan within Conservative Judaism in the United States. Serving congregations and performing concerts across America, his music was well known for its eclectic and melodious nature. As a tenor, his voice was widely acclaimed as one of the finest cantorial tenor voices in the latter half of the 20th century.

Ten Shabbat v'Ten Shalom
A 1973 recording of Cantor Frank Birnbaum performing "Ten Shabbat v'Ten Shalom" at Rodeph Shalom Synagogue in Philadelphia, Pennsylvania.

Avinu Malkeinu
Birnbaum sings Avinu Malkeinu

== Life ==
During World War II, Birnbaum fled his native home in Czechoslovakia and settled in Budapest. In 1948, he went to the United States, where he settled in New York City and began his studies at Columbia University.

Graduating from Columbia University in 1951, Birnbaum assumed a temporary position as Assistant to the Cantor at Central Synagogue in New York City. It soon became apparent that his vocal ability warranted a more permanent position, and he was subsequently made "Associate Cantor" of the synagogue. After serving Central Synagogue from 1951–1953, he assumed the position of chazzan at Congregation Shaare Zedek (New York City) from 1953–1957 and later Chevra Thilim in New Orleans, Louisiana, from 1957 to 1964. In 1959, he was inducted as a member of the Cantors Assembly of America.

In 1973, he left his position as music director at a temple in Silver Spring, Maryland to join the staff at Temple Israel in Charlotte, North Carolina. In 1986, after serving 13 years at Temple Israel, Birnbaum and his wife Minna moved to Plantation, Florida where he held services at Temple Kol Ami. He died on September 12, 2005.

== Accomplishments ==
Birnbaum served as President and Placement Chairman of the Cantors Assembly for the Conservative movement. He was a proponent for the investiture of women as cantors within the Conservative movement and an advocate for liturgical reform, which led to the printing of Siddur Sim Shalom in 1985 with his good friend Rabbi Jules Harlow.
