= Social studies (disambiguation) =

Social studies is the integrated study of the social sciences and humanities to promote civic competence.

Social studies may also refer to:

- Social Studies (band), an American rock band
- Social Studies (Carla Bley album), 1981
- Social Studies (Loudon Wainwright III album), 1999
- Social Studies (book), a 1981 collection of humorous essays by Fran Lebowitz
- Social Studies (1997 TV series), an American sitcom
- Social Studies (2024 TV series), an American documentary series

== See also ==
- Social sciences
