= Phil Sterner =

American politician (born 1960)

Phillip Sterner
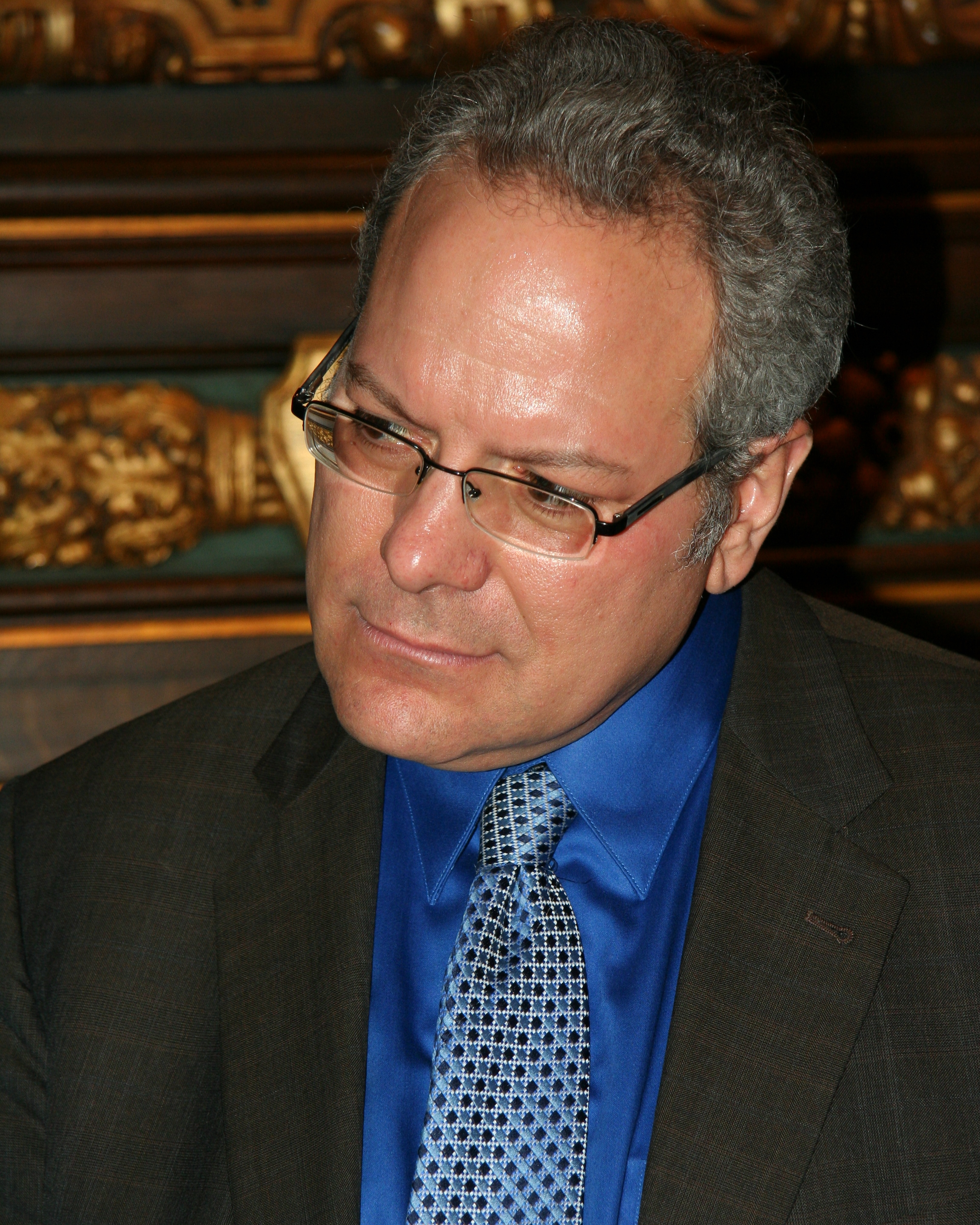

Member of the Minnesota House of Representatives from the 37B district
- In office January 6, 2009 – January 3, 2011
- Preceded by: Dennis Ozment
- Succeeded by: Kurt Bills

Personal details
- Born: 1960 (age 65–66) Bismarck, North Dakota, U.S.
- Party: Democratic Farmer Labor Party
- Children: 5
- Education: University of St. Thomas
- Occupation: Business owner, legislator

Phillip M. Sterner (born 1960) is a Minnesota politician, DFL Party member and former member of the Minnesota House of Representatives who represented State Senate District 37B, which included portions of Dakota County in the southeastern Twin Cities metropolitan area.

== Minnesota House of Representatives ==
Sterner served one term in the Minnesota House of Representatives. After the retirement announcement of long-time Republican Rep. Dennis Ozment, Sterner ran for and won the November 4, 2008, general election, defeating Republican Judy Lindsay. He was subsequently unseated by Republican Kurt Bills in the November 2, 2010, general election.

== Career ==
Sterner is the owner of an insurance business in Apple Valley and has served on the Rosemount City Council. He and his children have attended ISD 196 public schools.

== Political positions ==
Sterner's priorities while in office included job growth, reduction in property taxes, support for education, and making health care more effective and more affordable.
