= Temple Israel (Westport, Connecticut) =

Reform synagogue in Westport, Connecticut, US

- Location in Connecticut

Religion
- Affiliation: Reform Judaism
- Ecclesiastical or organisational status: Synagogue
- Leadership: Senior Rabbi Michael S. Friedman; Senior Cantor Julia Cadrain Associate Cantor Becky Mann Associate Rabbi Elana Nemitoff-Bresler (Associate); Associate Rabbi Zachary Plesent Associate Rabbi Lily Goldstein (Assistant); Rabbi Robert Orkand (Emeritus)
- Status: Active

Location
- Location: 14 Coleytown Road, Westport, Connecticut
- Country: United States
- Coordinates: 41°10′38″N 73°21′19″W

Architecture
- Type: Synagogue
- Established: 1948 (as a congregation)
- Completed: 1959

Website
- tiwestport.org

Temple Israel is a Reform Jewish congregation and synagogue located at 14 Coleytown Road, in Westport, Connecticut, in the United States. The congregation was founded in 1948 and the temple building was dedicated in May 1959. As of June, 2026,about 1050 families are members of the Temple Israel community.

== History ==
Throughout the 1960s, under the leadership of Byron T. Rubenstein, Temple Israel became a center of social change and activism, with speakers including James Baldwin, Margaret Mead and Rev. Martin Luther King Jr. In 1964, Rabbi Rubenstein protested as part of the St. Augustine movement, and was arrested along with 16 other Jewish leaders. This was the single largest mass arrest of rabbis in American history.

The synagogue was substantially renovated and expanded in 1990, more than doubling the capacity of the sanctuary. In 2002–2003, another expansion of the temple substantially expanded the religious school wing, which houses the Leo and Libby Nevas Religious School and the pre-school program.

In 2012, the temple board simultaneously announced the retirement of Rabbi Robert Orkand and Cantor Richard Silverman, as well as the departure of Associate Rabbi Alysa Mendelson Graf, Cantor Scott Harris, and Executive Director Sandy Silverstein. This shakeup, particularly the choice to dismiss Rabbi Mendelson and Cantor Harris, caused considerable controversy within the congregation. Eventually, congregational pressure led to the board's decision to offer an ultimately rejected extension contract to Rabbi Mendelson.

On May 12, 2015, two protesters entered Temple Israel with the intent to disrupt a luncheon. Initial reports that they were armed led to lockdowns at the temple's pre-school, as well as the nearby Coleytown Elementary and Middle Schools and the pre-school at the Unitarian Church. The protesters were arrested and charged with criminal trespass and breach of peace.

== Current Rabbinical leadership ==
The following individuals have served as senior rabbi of Temple Israel:

Ordinal	Officeholder	Term start	Term end	Time in office	Notes
1	Byron T. Rubenstein	1959	1982	22–23 years	Notably a friend of Rev. Martin Luther King Jr., a participant in the June 1964 St. Augustine movement, and a subsequent arrestee along with 16 other Jewish leaders in the largest mass arrest of rabbis in American history
2	Robert Orkand	1982	2013	30–31 years	Former president of ARZA (2008–2012)
−	Rick Shapiro	June 2013	June 2014	1 year	Interim Senior Rabbi during the search process
3	Michael S. Friedman	2014	incumbent	11–12 years	

In addition, as of January 2024 the following individuals currently serve in supporting rabbinical posts:

- Rabbi Elena Nemitoff-Bresler, as Associate Rabbi and Director of Education, since 2019
- Rabbi Zachary Plesent, as Assistant Rabbi, since 2021

== See also ==
- List of synagogues named Temple Israel
