= Cal Bahr =

American politician

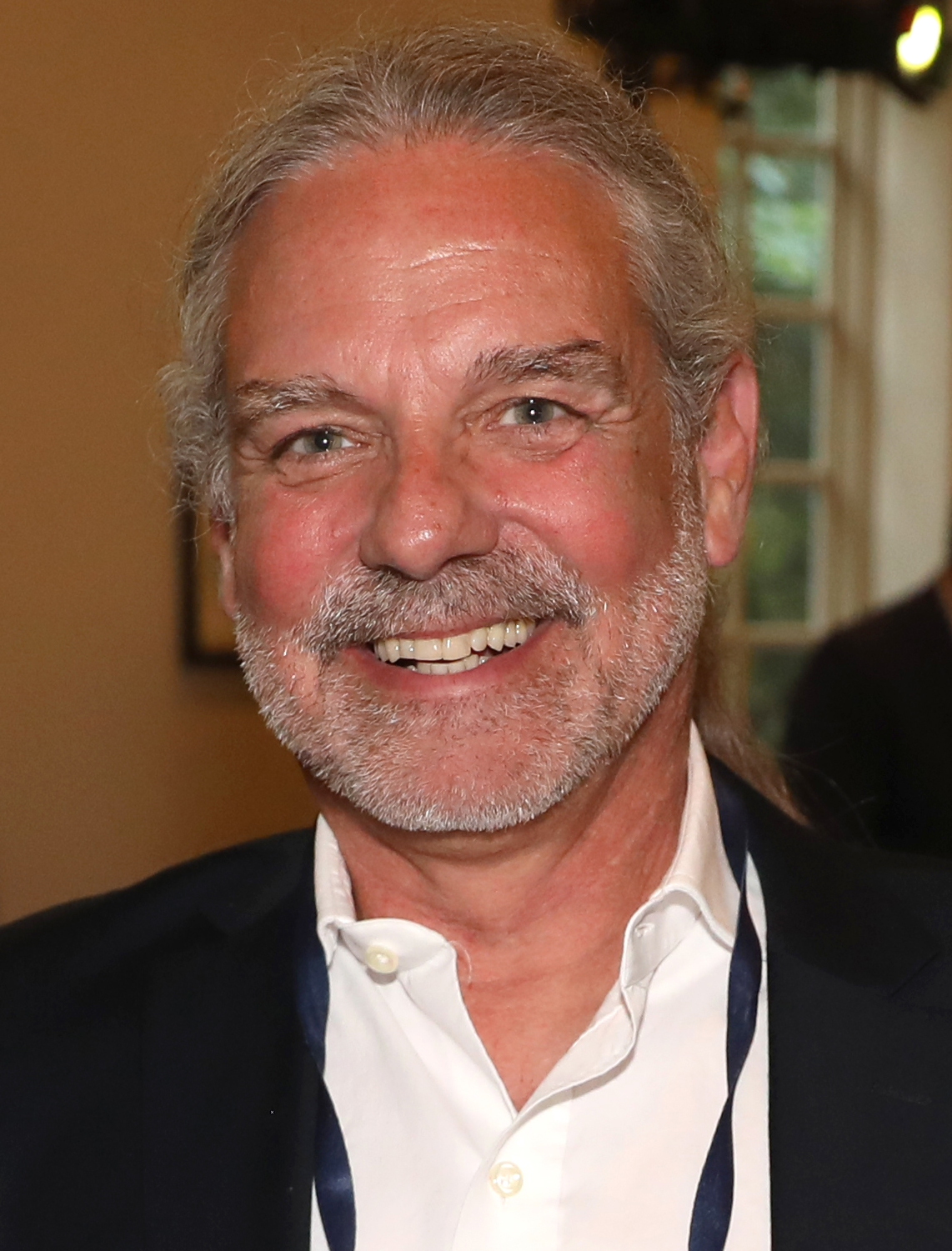

Member of the Minnesota Senate from the 31st District
- Incumbent
- Assumed office January 3, 2023
- Preceded by: Michelle Benson

Member of the Minnesota House of Representatives from the 31B district
- In office January 3, 2017 – January 4, 2023
- Preceded by: Tom Hackbarth
- Succeeded by: Peggy Scott

Personal details
- Born: July 17, 1962 (age 64) Cook County, Illinois, U.S.
- Party: Republican
- Spouse: Ellen Carey (Borchert)
- Education: Stockton High School
- Occupation: Small Business Owner

Calvin K. Bahr (born July 17, 1962) is an American businessman, truck driver, and politician serving since 2023 as a member of the Minnesota Senate. A member of the Republican Party of Minnesota, he represents the 31st district in the northern Twin Cities metropolitan area.

== Career ==
Bahr was in the United States Army from 1980 to 1989. He was a member of the Upper Rum River Water Management Organization board.

=== Minnesota House of Representatives ===
Bahr was elected to the Minnesota House of Representatives in 2016. He won the Republican endorsement over incumbent Tom Hackbarth and defeated him in the Republican primary. He was reelected in 2018. On December 7, 2018, Bahr and three other House members left the GOP House Caucus to form the New House Republican Caucus due to dissatisfaction with the House Republican leadership. The caucus has introduced bills that feature their strong interest in constitutional issues as well as their own budget proposal.

=== Minnesota Senate ===
In 2022, Bahr ran for the open 31st State Senate seat, after incumbent Michelle Benson retired. He won the Republican primary with 78.6% of the vote, and defeated Democratic nominee Jason Ruffalo in the general election.

Bahr is considered one of the Senate's farthest-right members.

In 2023, Bahr went viral after a video from a vote during the legislative session showed him voting shirtless from a bed. According to a party spokesperson, Bahr had been working until 4:45am driving his truck the night before the vote.

== Electoral history ==
- 2022 Minnesota Senate race — District 31
  - Cal Bahr (R) 63.7% (25,705 votes)
  - Jason Ruffalo (DFL), 36.2% (14,585 votes)
  - Write-in, 0.1% (22 votes)
- 2020 Minnesota House of Representatives race — District 31B
  - Cal Bahr (R) 67.1% (17,447 votes)
  - Susan Larson (DFL), 32.8% (8,532 votes)
  - Write-in, 0.1% (22 votes)
- 2018 Minnesota House of Representatives race — District 31B
  - Cal Bahr (R) 64.4% (12,840 votes)
  - Susan Larson (DFL), 35.5% (7,080 votes)
  - Write-in, 0.1% (18 votes)
- 2016 Minnesota House of Representatives race — District 31B
  - Cal Bahr (R) 66.53% (14,785 votes)
  - Susan Larson (DFL), 33.47% (7,438 votes)

== Personal life ==
Bahr had two daughters with his first wife. Combined, he and his second wife, Ellen, who died in 2020, have four children and three grandchildren. Bahr resides in East Bethel, Minnesota.
