= Social Studies (band) =

Social Studies is an indie rock band from San Francisco, California, composed of Natalia Rogovin (vocals, keyboards), Tom Smith (guitar), Ben McClintock (guitar), Jesse Hudson (bass, backup vocals), and Michael Jirkovsky (drums). Their sound has been described as “structurally trim and sonically dazzling”.

The band formed in 2006 with original members Natalia Rogovin (vocals, keyboards), Aaron Weiss (guitar), Darren Henry (bass), and Michael Jirkovsky (drums). They released This Is the World’s Biggest Hammer, an EP with 7 songs, in 2006. After attending SXSW in 2009, and touring the United States, the band reconfigured, replacing bassist Darren Henry with Jason Kick (Maus Haus), and then Jesse Hudson (Dealership), and guitarist Aaron Weiss with Tyler McCauley (Tempo No Tempo) and then Tom Smith (Office, Mazes).

The band recorded its debut LP Wind Up Wooden Heart, and mixed the record in 2010 with Jay Pellicci (Deerhoof, Death Cab For Cutie, The Dodos), Laura Dean (John Vanderslice, The Troggs), and Natalia Rogovin. They subsequently signed to Antenna Farm Records in 2010, and the album was released on July 27, 2010, with the singles, “Holler Boys” and “Time Bandit”, both premiering on RCRD LBL. The record charted on CMJ at #49. The band released two music videos, for “Time Bandit” which premiered on Venus Zine and then NME, and for “Holler Boys”, which premiered on PopMatters. The song "Time Bandit" was remixed by The One AM Radio and released on Filter. The single “Holler Boys” was remixed by Nicholas Dobratz (of Of Montreal and Sugar and Gold) and the song "Battle of Shiloh" was remixed by Ernest Gonzales. The band spent the next few years touring the country and promoting their record, playing SXSW, CMJ, and Silverlake Jubilee in 2010, SXSW and Noise Pop in 2011, and Noise Pop in 2012, and touring with bands including Wye Oak, Tune-Yards, The Dodos, Lotus Plaza, Dungen, Au Revoir Simone, Ramona Falls, Handsome Furs, Joan of Arc, Admiral Radley, Sea of Bees, Typhoon, and The Donkeys.

Social Studies returned to the studio in 2012 to work on Developer, their sophomore LP. They recorded the record with producer and engineer Eli Crews (Tune-Yards, Thao & Mirah) at New, Improved Recording in Oakland, California. The album was released on November 27, 2012, on Antenna Farm Records. The record's first single, “Terracur”, premiered on Nylon, and their follow-up single, "Away For the Weekend", premiered on Vice. The band then released a music video for "Terracur" on Paste. The full record streamed on Rdio a week before the official release, and was featured on iTunes's "New and Noteworthy" section. The record charted #54 on CMJ.
