= Temple Israel (Minneapolis) =

Reform synagogue in Minneapolis, Minnesota, United States

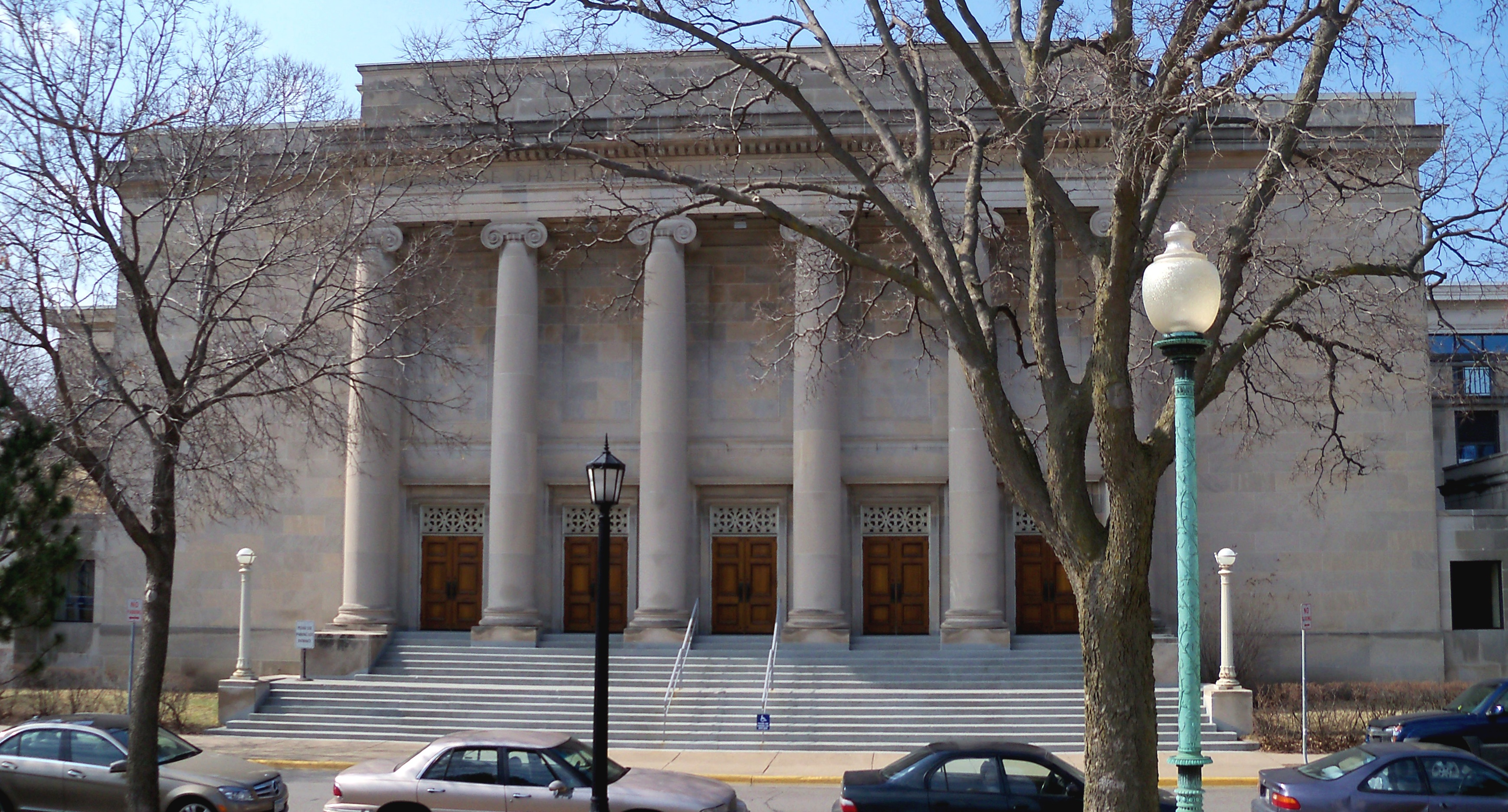
- Temple Israel

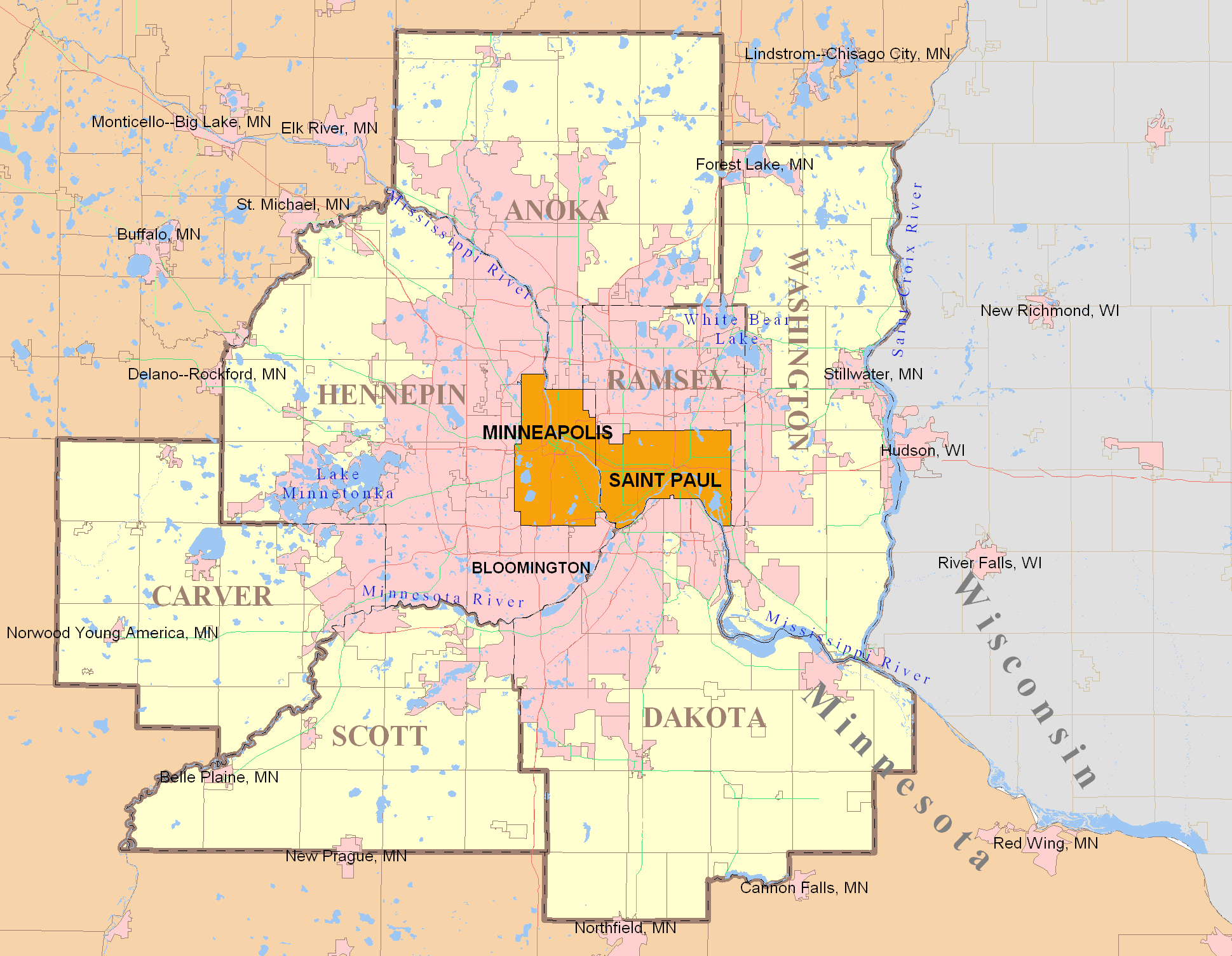
- Location in Minneapolis, Minnesota

Religion
- Affiliation: Reform Judaism
- Ecclesiastical or organizational status: Synagogue
- Leadership: Rabbi Marcia Zimmerman
- Status: Active

Location
- Location: 2323 Fremont Avenue South, Minneapolis, Minnesota
- Country: United States
- Interactive map of Temple Israel
- Coordinates: 44°57′34″N 93°17′42″W

Architecture
- Architect: Liebenberg and Kaplan
- Type: Synagogue
- Style: Neoclassical
- Established: 1878 (as a congregation)
- Completed: 1880 (5th Street); 1888 (10th Street #1); c. 1902 (10th Street #2); 1914 (West 24th Street); 1928 (Fremont Avenue)

Website
- templeisrael.com

Temple Israel is a Reform Jewish synagogue in Minneapolis, Minnesota, in the United States. Founded in 1878, it is the oldest synagogue in Minneapolis and one of the largest Jewish congregations in the United States.

== Early history ==
Temple Israel, originally called Shaarai Tov ("Gates of Goodness"), was founded in 1878 by German-speaking Jewish merchants. Their first house of worship, built in 1880, was located on Fifth Street between First Avenue (later Marquette Avenue) and Second Avenue South; it was a small, wooden synagogue in the popular Moorish Revival style. In 1888, the congregation moved to Tenth Street and Fifth Avenue South. When the synagogue burned down in 1902, the congregants erected a new synagogue in stone on the site of the lost building.

In 1914, the congregation moved to its current location, this time to the corner of West Twenty-Fourth Street and Emerson Avenue South. In 1920, Shaarai Tov became Reform and changed their name to Temple Israel. In September 1912, Deinard organized a visit from Baháʼí Faith leader `Abdu'l-Bahá—visiting Minneapolis while on a speaking tour of the U.S.–who gave a public talk on Baháʼí teachings and the spiritualization of society at Temple Israel. In 1928, a new synagogue was built on the same site, this time by the firm of Jack Liebenberg and Seeman Kaplan; this Neoclassical-style building remains a landmark overlooking Hennepin Avenue in Uptown Minneapolis.

Hammel, Green and Abrahamson (HGA) designed a $21 million expansion including a lobby and an education center that was completed in fall 2016.

== Rabbinical leadership ==
In 1901, Shaarai Tov hired Rabbi Samuel N. Deinard, an influential rabbi who helped grow the congregation. He acted as mediator between his Americanized congregants and the Eastern European Jewish immigrants who lived in North Minneapolis. Deinard also founded a local Jewish weekly newspaper, the American Jewish World, in 1912.

Rabbi Deinard died suddenly and unexpectedly in 1921. His successor was Rabbi Albert Minda, who acted as head rabbi from 1922 to 1963. Rabbi Max Shapiro, Temple Israel's assistant rabbi since 1955, succeeded Minda and was named rabbi emeritus in 1985.

Marcia Zimmerman was hired as assistant rabbi in 1988, and in 2001, was named senior rabbi, making her the first woman senior rabbi of a congregation of more than two thousand families in the United States.

== See also ==
- List of synagogues in Minnesota
- List of synagogues named Temple Israel
