= George B. Leonard =

American lawyer

George B. Leonard (1872–1956) was an early 20th Century American lawyer at the firm of Leonard, Street & Deinard and a civil rights activist based in Minneapolis, Minnesota, best known for his service on the Board of Regents for his alma mater, the University of Minnesota.

== Background ==
George B. Leonard was born on February 9, 1872, in Shavli (now Šiauliai), Kovno Governorate, present-day Lithuania, to Jewish parents Victor Abramson and Taube Melnick. He studied at gymnasium before the family. Barred from the University of Kazan and coming under police surveillance, he moved to Paris, where he studied at the Sorbonne and other schools. Already socialistic, he joined left-wing movements and met Keir Hardie, a Scottish miner and first Labour MP. In 1892, he migrated to the United States, worked briefly in Manhattan and Philadelphia, and then moved to Minneapolis in 1894. In 1896, he graduated from the University of Minnesota Law School.

== Career ==
Leonard practiced law from the late 1890s until the 1950s and was a partner in Leonard, Street and Deinard. The firm was the first in the state to accept Jews and women as partners.

Leonard was a co-founder of the Farmer-Labor Party and Democratic-Farmer-Labor Party. He was a committed socialist for decades (1890s–1910s)

Leonard served as a regent (1937–1939) of the University of Minnesota, appointed by Governor Elmer Benson. Leonard also served on the board of the National Association for the Advancement of Colored People (NAACP), during which time he advocated for integration at University of Minnesota's School of Nursing.

== Personal life and death ==
In 1905, Leonard married Elizabeth V. DeMerse; they had two children, John D. Leonard and George D. Leonard.

Leonard's associations included: Knights of Labor, Socialist Party of America (Minnesota) (1921–1947), League for Industrial Democracy, American Civil Liberties Union (ACLU), International Juridical Association, National Lawyers Guild (1936–1942), Foreign Policy Association, Minneapolis and Hennepin County bar associations (1924–1953), and various civil rights and Jewish aid organizations.

Leonard died in 1956.

== Legacy ==
In 1923, the New York Times called Leonard a "master mind of the laborites... a radical and a free thinker" in his youth for whom Socialism was "a passion, a philosophy" who thought in terms of centuries about great socialist experiments in government. The newspaper claimed that only Leonard knew how the Farmer-Labor Party and the Non-Partisan League merged.

Leonard's papers include correspondence with: Roy G. Blakey (1935–1937), August Claessens (1935–1937), Osmond Fraenkel, Charles L. Horn (1936–1948), Philip LaFollette (1936–1939), Robert LaFollette (1936–1939), Hubert Humphrey, Max Lowenthal (1933–1950), Floyd B. Olson, Gunnar Nordbye, Maude C. Stockwell (1936-1938), Oswald Garrison Villard (1935), and Sidney Wallach (1935–1936). Boyhood papers in Russian include a diary (1887–1888), composition books, and printed items (1876–1931).

== External sources ==
- University of Minnesota: George B. Leonard Papers
- University of Minnesota: A Campus Divided
- University of Minnesota: Max Lowenthal papers
