= Temple Israel (Charlotte, North Carolina) =

Conservative synagogue in Charlotte, North Carolina, US

- Location in North Carolina

Religion
- Affiliation: Conservative Judaism
- Rite: Nusach Ashkenaz
- Ecclesiastical or organizational status: Synagogue
- Leadership: Rabbi Michael Wolk
- Status: Active

Location
- Location: 4901 Providence Road, Shalom Park, Charlotte, North Carolina 28226
- Country: United States
- Interactive map of Temple Israel
- Coordinates: 35°08′52″N 80°47′20″W

Architecture
- Type: Synagogue architecture
- Style: Modernist
- Established: 1895 (as a congregation)
- Completed: 1915 (Seventh Street); 1949 (Dilworth); 1992 (Shalom Park)

Website
- templeisraelnc.org

Temple Israel is a Conservative Jewish congregation and synagogue located at 4901 Providence Road, in the Shalom Park district of South Charlotte, North Carolina, in the United States. One of six synagogues in Charlotte, Temple Israel serves more than 650 member families. Its third and current synagogue building was complete in 1992 in the Modernist style, feature floor to ceiling stained glass windows in the sanctuary.

The rabbi since July 2020 is Michael Wolk, who took over from interim Rabbi Howard Seigel. Seigel succeeding the long serving rabbi of 24 years, Murray Ezring. The cantor since 2018 has been soprano Shira T. Lissek, previously of Park Avenue Synagogue, New York.

== History ==
With the great wave of immigration of Jews from Eastern Europe occurring in the late 19th century, new settlers came to Charlotte. This group also was deeply religious and brought with them their own customs and attitudes. In September 1895, these new citizens organized the first formal Jewish congregation of the city of Charlotte. This congregation was the forerunner of what is now Temple Israel. They called themselves Agudath Achim, Hebrew United Brotherhood. The group was headed by Harris Miller, Benjamin Silverstein, and Mr. C. Lubin.

By 1915, now "Temple Israel" had constructed its first building and the number of families grew to more than 100. Two minyans existed at the Temple, one Orthodox and one Conservative. Eventually, the younger members persuaded the congregation to adopt a stance of worship leading more toward "Conservatism." This gave way to mixed seating and more use of English in the service.

In 1948 Temple Israel, together with Temple Beth-El, erected a monument to Judah P. Benjamin, "Attorney General, Secretary of War, and Secretary of State of the Confederate government... as a Gift to the North Carolina Division, United Daughters of the Confederacy".

By 1949, Temple Israel had outgrown its building on Seventh Street and relocated to the Dilworth neighborhood of South Charlotte. By 1955, Temple Israel boasted the largest membership of any Jewish congregation in the Carolinas with more than 350 member families. In 1985, the synagogue adopted an egalitarian policy for worship, granting women full rights at services to read from the Torah, lead song, and lead prayer.

In 1991, Temple Israel broke ground in Shalom Park of South Charlotte and began construction on its current building; completed in 1992. In 1994, Rabbi Murray Ezring became Temple Israel's 19th Senior Rabbi, and later served as Rabbi Emeritus. Rabbi Michael Wolk joined Temple Israel July 1, 2020 as its 20th Senior Rabbi.

== Affiliates ==
In serving the greater Charlotte metropolitan area, Congregation Emanuel in Statesville is affiliated with Temple Israel. The Emanuel congregation is without full-time clergy, so Temple Israel provides rabbinic leadership, monetary support, and resources to help support this congregation.

== Notable clergy ==
- Frank Birnbaum, cantor, served from 1973 until 1986. Known for his famous songwriting and vocal ability, the Annual Cantor's Concert is named in his honor.
