= Samuel Deinard =

American rabbi

Samuel Nathaniel Deinard (1873–1921) was a rabbi in Minneapolis, Minnesota. From 1901 to 1921, Deinard held the position of rabbi at Temple Israel in Minneapolis, Minnesota.

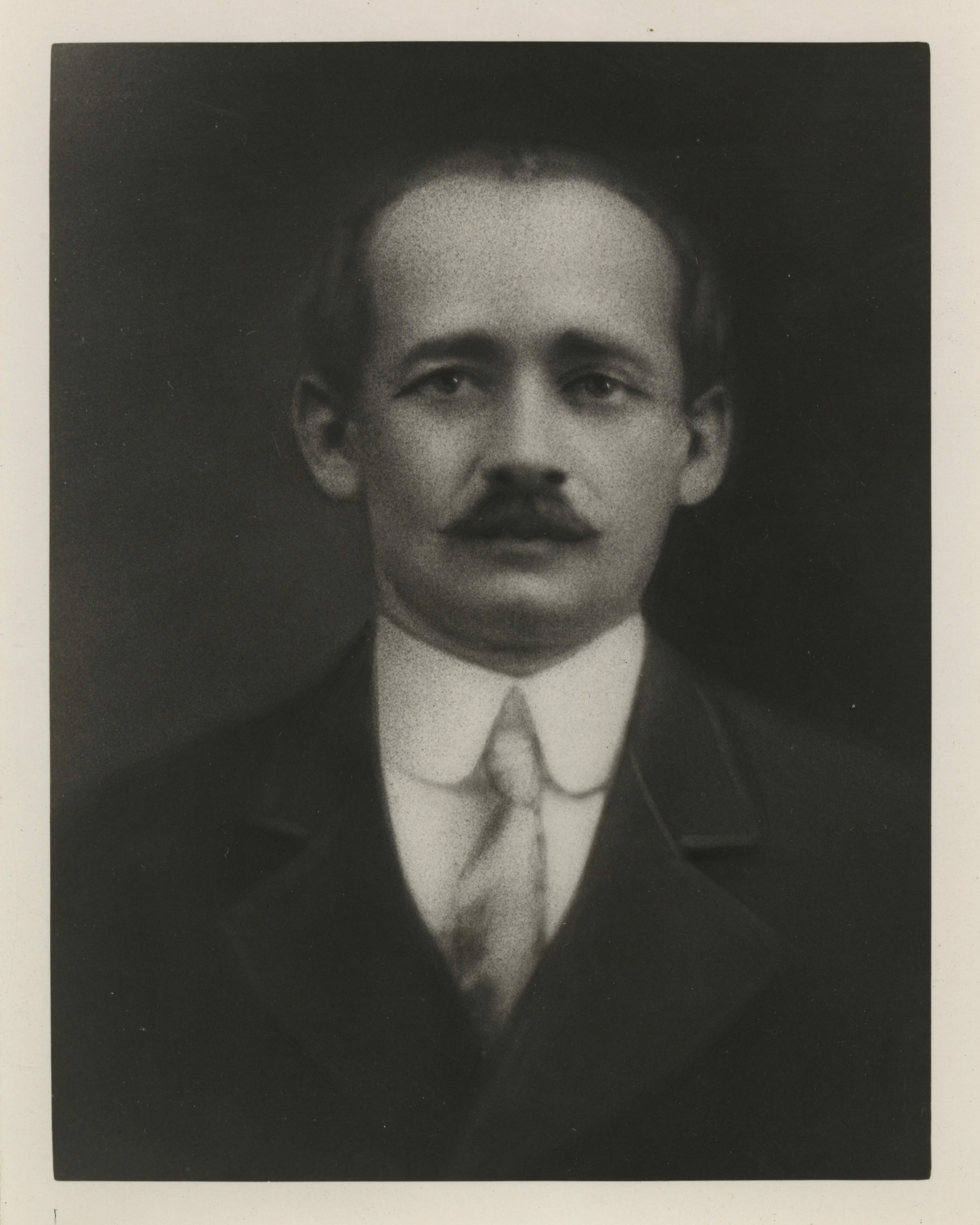

== Family and education ==
Samuel Nathaniel Deinard was born on January 25, 1873, in Raseiniai, Russian Empire, to father David Menachem and mother Taube Leah. In 1882 the family moved to Palestine. By 1888 Samuel was sent to Germany on a Baron de Rothschild scholarship to prepare for ordination as a rabbi. By 1892 Samuel had graduated early and went to the United States, graduating from DePauw University in 1896 and then in 1902 obtaining a master's degree from the University of Chicago Divinity School. In 1905 he completed his studies at the University of Minnesota, obtaining a doctorate in Semitic studies. Deinard became a professor of Semitic languages and literature at the University of Minnesota

In 1896, Deinard married Rose, his distant cousin; they had three children: Amos, Benedict, and Miriam. Amos and Benedict would later go on to found the law firm Leonard, Street, and Deinard in 1922.

== Temple Israel ==
In 1901, Rabbi Deinard was hired at Shaarai Tov (later named Temple Israel), the oldest Jewish synagogue in Minneapolis. Deinard promoted peace and partnership between the older, more established community of German Jews, and the newer, more Orthodox Jews coming from Eastern Europe. Although Deinard was a supporter of Reform Judaism, he was welcoming to Orthodox families in the community. Under his leadership the once-struggling congregation saw a steady growth in membership, the building of a new Temple edifice, and a general growth of status and influence in both the Jewish community and the community as a whole. Deinard was also a strong supporter of Zionism, even at a time when Zionism was not generally accepted by the Reform community

Deinard was active within non-Jewish communities as well, serving as the first president of the Minneapolis chapter of the National Association for the Advancement of Colored People (NAACP).

== American Jewish World ==
Deinard worked to get a Jewish newspaper off the ground in the Twin Cities. His first three efforts were short lived -- Jewish Progress, followed by The Judean, and then The Scribe. Each failed to secure financial support. However, in 1912, Jewish Weekly was launched; this eventually became The American Jewish World. In 1915, Deinard handed the reins over to Leonard H. Frisch to act as publisher, production, and sales manager. Today the newspaper still stands as an important news resource for the local Jewish community.

== Death ==
On October 12, 1921, Temple Israel's congregation gathered for Kol Nidre Service on Yom Kippur eve. Deinard was not in attendance, as he had died from a heart attack earlier in the day. His sudden death, coupled with his popularity and relative young age, stunned the local Jewish community. His funeral was held at Temple Israel. Deinard's successor, Rabbi Albert G. Minda, remarked about Deinard's funeral: "A multitude of people attended the services, said to be the largest and most diversified group present at any funeral ever held in Minneapolis up to that time."
