= 2020 Minnesota Senate election =

2020 Minnesota State Senate election
- November 3, 2020

All 67 seats in the Minnesota Senate 34 seats needed for a majority
- Turnout: 79.98% ▲5.26 pp
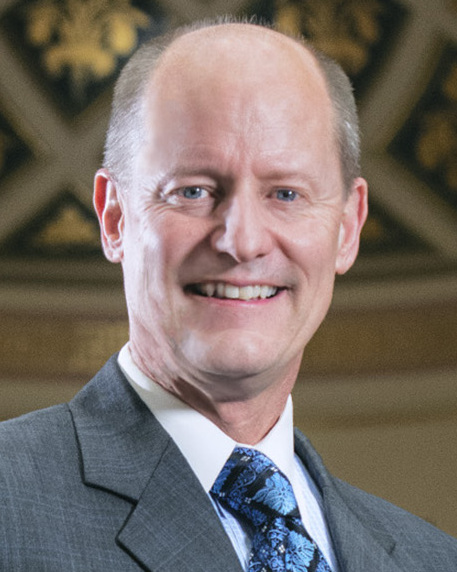

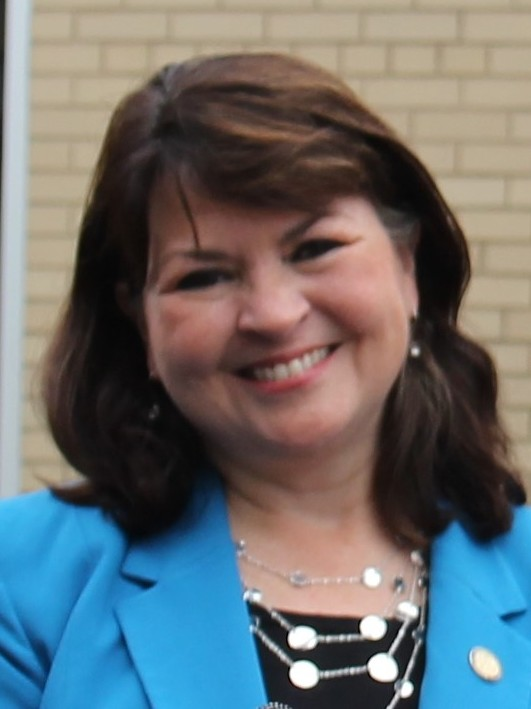
	Majority party	Minority party
Leader	Paul Gazelka	Susan Kent
Party	Republican	Democratic (DFL)
Leader since	November 10, 2016	February 1, 2020
Leader's seat	9th–Nisswa	53rd–Woodbury
Last election	34 seats, 48.96%	33 seats, 50.12%
Seats before	35	32
Seats won	34	33
Seat change	▼1	▲1
Popular vote	1,532,446	1,577,523
Percentage	48.39%	49.82%
Swing	▼0.57 pp	▼0.30 pp
- Results: Republican hold Republican gain DFL hold DFL gain Vote share: 40–50% 50–60% 60–70% 50–60% 60–70% 70–80% 80–90% >90%
Majority Leader before election
Paul Gazelka
Republican
Elected Majority Leader
Paul Gazelka
Republican

The 2020 Minnesota Senate election was held in the U.S. state of Minnesota on November 3, 2020, to elect members to the Senate of the 92nd Minnesota Legislature. A primary election was held in several districts on August 11, 2020. The election coincided with the election of the other house of the Legislature, the House of Representatives, and other elections.

== Background ==
The last election in 2016 resulted in the Republican Party of Minnesota winning a majority of seats, after losing a majority to the Minnesota Democratic–Farmer–Labor Party (DFL) only four years earlier in the previous election in 2012. In conjunction with the result of the House election, it also resulted in the return of all-Republican control of the Legislature for the first time since 2012, and only the second time Republicans had had majorities in both houses since the return of partisan elections to the Senate in 1976. Control of the Senate had alternated between the Republicans and the DFL every election since 2010. All-Republican control of the Legislature ended when the DFL won a majority in the House in 2018.

A special election was held for District 11 on February 5, 2019, as a result of the resignation of incumbent DFL Senator Tony Lourey after he was selected to be the next commissioner of human services by Governor-elect Tim Walz in early January 2019. Republican state representative Jason Rarick won the special election, increasing the Republican majority to 35 seats.

In October 2020, The Washington Post identified this state election as one of eight whose outcomes could affect partisan balance during post-census redistricting.

== Electoral system ==
The 67 members of the Senate were elected from single-member districts via first-past-the-post voting for two-year terms. Contested nominations of recognized major parties (DFL, Grassroots–Legalize Cannabis, Legal Marijuana Now, and Republican) for each district were determined by an open primary election. Minor party candidates were nominated by petition. Write-in candidates must have filed a request with the secretary of state's office for votes for them to be counted. The filing period was from May 19 to June 2, 2020.

== Retiring members ==
Retiring incumbents (light red and light blue) by district

=== Republican ===
- Paul Anderson, 44th
- Scott Jensen, 47th

=== DFL ===
- Carolyn Laine, 41st
- Dick Cohen, 64th

== Primary elections results ==
A primary election was held on August 11 in 16 districts to nominate Republican and DFL candidates. Four Republican nominations and 13 DFL nominations were contested. Nine incumbents were opposed for their party's nomination. DFL incumbents Erik Simonson in District 7 and Jeff Hayden in District 62 were not renominated.

District	Party	Candidates	Votes	%
6	DFL	David Tomassoni (inc)	6,519	86.41
6	DFL	Christopher Horoshak	1,025	13.59
7	DFL	Jen McEwen	8,603	73.54
7	DFL	Erik Simonson (inc)	3,095	26.46
9	Republican	Paul Gazelka (inc)	5,822	83.49
9	Republican	Richard Dahl	1,151	16.51
10	Republican	Carrie Ruud (inc)	5,558	82.50
10	Republican	Shaun Christian Hansen	1,179	17.50
22	DFL	Shawna Marshall	1,897	76.06
22	DFL	Roger Elgersma	597	23.94
34	DFL	Bonnie Westlin	5,810	71.81
34	DFL	Aarica Coleman	2,281	28.19
39	DFL	Josiah Hill	7,188	86.94
39	DFL	Brian Hile	1,080	13.06
43	DFL	Chuck Wiger	6,051	69.67
43	DFL	Natasha Lapcinski	2,634	30.33
44	DFL	Ann Johnson Stewart	9,672	76.59
44	DFL	Zina Alston Fizer	2,956	23.41
47	Republican	Julia Coleman	4,586	63.52
47	Republican	Tom Funk	2,634	36.48
47	DFL	Addie Miller	5,105	86.97
47	DFL	Bala Chintaginjala	765	13.03
49	Republican	Julie Dupré	2,581	62.78
49	Republican	Jenny Rhoades	1,530	37.22
53	DFL	Susan Kent	6,418	66.63
53	DFL	Marquita Stephens	3,214	33.37
56	DFL	Lindsey Port	4,669	66.70
56	DFL	Kevin Shea	1,925	27.50
56	DFL	Richard Tucker	406	5.80
59	DFL	Bobby Joe Champion	11,639	77.07
59	DFL	Suleiman Isse	3,463	22.93
62	DFL	Omar Fateh	11,109	54.86
62	DFL	Jeff Hayden (inc)	9,140	45.14
65	DFL	Sandy Pappas	7,484	63.67
65	DFL	Laverne McCartney Knighton	4,270	36.33
Source: Minnesota Secretary of State

== Predictions ==
Source	Ranking	As of
The Cook Political Report	Tossup	October 21, 2020

== Results ==
Districts won

Party	Candidates	Votes			Seats		
Party	Candidates	No.	%	+/−	No.	+/−	%
Republican Party of Minnesota	67	1,532,446	48.39	−0.57	34	−1	50.75
Minnesota Democratic–Farmer–Labor Party	65	1,577,523	49.82	−0.30	33	+1	49.25
Legal Marijuana Now Party	7	29,841	0.94	+0.62	0	0	0.00
Grassroots–Legalize Cannabis Party	6	17,291	0.55	+0.55	0	0	0.00
Independence–Alliance Party of Minnesota	1	5,654	0.18	+0.07	0	0	0.00
Write-in	N/A	3,835	0.12	−0.09	0	0	0.00
Total		3,166,590	100.00	±0.00	67	±0	100.00
Invalid/blank votes		127,190	3.86	−1.38			
Total		3,293,780	100.00	±0			
Registered voters/Turnout		4,118,462	79.98	+5.26			
Source: Minnesota Secretary of State, Star Tribune

=== Close races ===
Districts where the margin of victory was under 10%:

1. District 14, 0.8% (gain)
2. District 34, 1.56%
3. District 26, 1.76%
4. District 25, 2.53%
5. District 27, 4.5% (gain)
6. District 38, 4.15%
7. District 37, 4.25%
8. District 54, 5.83%
9. District 39, 6.02%
10. District 56, 6.12% (gain)
11. District 33, 8%
12. District 53, 8.26%
13. District 58, 9.08% (gain)
14. District 4, 9.16%
15. District 3, 9.51%

=== District results ===
District	Incumbent			Candidates				
District	Name	Party	First elected	Name	Party	Votes	%	Winner Party
1	Mark Johnson	Republican	2016	Mark Johnson	Republican	27,972	69.63	Republican
1	Mark Johnson	Republican	2016	Reed Perkins	DFL	12,162	30.28	Republican
2	Paul Utke	Republican	2016	Paul Utke	Republican	28,951	65.11	Republican
2	Paul Utke	Republican	2016	Alan Roy	DFL	15,458	34.76	Republican
3	Tom Bakk	DFL	2002	Tom Bakk	DFL	26,700	55.19	DFL
3	Tom Bakk	DFL	2002	Christopher Hogan	Republican	21,613	44.68	DFL
4	Kent Eken	DFL	2012	Kent Eken	DFL	23,333	54.53	DFL
4	Kent Eken	DFL	2012	Mark Larson	Republican	19,415	45.37	DFL
5	Justin Eichorn	Republican	2016	Justin Eichorn	Republican	25,169	55.59	Republican
5	Justin Eichorn	Republican	2016	Rita Albrecht	DFL	16,706	36.89	Republican
5	Justin Eichorn	Republican	2016	Robyn Smith	LMN	2,400	5.30	Republican
5	Justin Eichorn	Republican	2016	Dennis Barsness	Grassroots	967	2.14	Republican
6	David Tomassoni	DFL	2000	David Tomassoni	DFL	25,557	57.04	DFL
6	David Tomassoni	DFL	2000	John Moren	Republican	19,191	42.83	DFL
7	Erik Simonson (Note: Lost primary election for party's nomination.)	DFL	2016	Jen McEwen	DFL	30,526	68.32	DFL
7	Erik Simonson	DFL	2016	Donna Bergstrom	Republican	14,081	31.51	DFL
8	Bill Ingebrigtsen	Republican	2006	Bill Ingebrigtsen	Republican	33,625	67.69	Republican
8	Bill Ingebrigtsen	Republican	2006	Michele Anderson	DFL	15,997	32.20	Republican
9	Paul Gazelka	Republican	2010	Paul Gazelka	Republican	33,472	75.60	Republican
9	Paul Gazelka	Republican	2010	A. John Peters	DFL	10,765	24.31	Republican
10	Carrie Ruud	Republican	2002 (Note: Lost re-election in 2006. Elected again in 2012.)	Carrie Ruud	Republican	33,027	67.55	Republican
10	Carrie Ruud	Republican	2002	Steve Samuelson	DFL	15,828	32.37	Republican
11	Jason Rarick	Republican	2019 (Note: Elected in a special election.)	Jason Rarick	Republican	24,498	56.58	Republican
11	Jason Rarick	Republican	2019	Michelle Lee	DFL	18,761	43.33	Republican
12	Torrey Westrom	Republican	2012	Torrey Westrom	Republican	33,442	74.42	Republican
12	Torrey Westrom	Republican	2012	Jill Abahsain	DFL	11,467	25.52	Republican
13	Jeff Howe	Republican	2018	Jeff Howe	Republican	32,623	69.43	Republican
13	Jeff Howe	Republican	2018	Michael Willemsen	DFL	14,306	30.45	Republican
14	Jerry Relph	Republican	2016	Aric Putnam	DFL	18,318	46.39	DFL
14	Jerry Relph	Republican	2016	Jerry Relph	Republican	18,002	45.59	DFL
14	Jerry Relph	Republican	2016	Jaden Partlow	LMN	3,127	7.92	DFL
15	Andrew Mathews	Republican	2016	Andrew Mathews	Republican	33,886	72.25	Republican
15	Andrew Mathews	Republican	2016	Brent Krist	DFL	12,957	27.63	Republican
16	Gary Dahms	Republican	2010	Gary Dahms	Republican	29,696	73.64	Republican
16	Gary Dahms	Republican	2010	Joshua Prine	IA	5,654	14.02	Republican
16	Gary Dahms	Republican	2010	Steve Preslicka	LMN	4,880	12.10	Republican
17	Andrew Lang	Republican	2016	Andrew Lang	Republican	28,337	67.86	Republican
17	Andrew Lang	Republican	2016	Fernando Alvarado	DFL	13,383	32.05	Republican
18	Scott Newman	Republican	2010	Scott Newman	Republican	31,357	71.35	Republican
18	Scott Newman	Republican	2010	Chad Tschimperle	DFL	12,538	28.53	Republican
19	Nick Frentz	DFL	2016	Nick Frentz	DFL	26,165	59.82	DFL
19	Nick Frentz	DFL	2016	Elizabeth Bangert	Republican	17,504	40.02	DFL
20	Rich Draheim	Republican	2016	Rich Draheim	Republican	26,523	54.24	Republican
20	Rich Draheim	Republican	2016	Jon Olson	DFL	19,431	39.73	Republican
20	Rich Draheim	Republican	2016	Jason Hoschette	Grassroots	2,901	5.93	Republican
21	Mike Goggin	Republican	2016	Mike Goggin	Republican	27,981	59.67	Republican
21	Mike Goggin	Republican	2016	Ralph Kaehler	DFL	18,871	40.25	Republican
22	Bill Weber	Republican	2012	Bill Weber	Republican	26,697	69.17	Republican
22	Bill Weber	Republican	2012	Shawna Marshall	DFL	9,936	25.74	Republican
22	Bill Weber	Republican	2012	Brian Abrahamson	Grassroots	1,947	5.04	Republican
23	Julie Rosen	Republican	2002	Julie Rosen	Republican	32,533	78.66	Republican
23	Julie Rosen	Republican	2002	David Pulkrabek	LMN	8,730	21.11	Republican
24	John Jasinski	Republican	2016	John Jasinski	Republican	25,943	63.66	Republican
24	John Jasinski	Republican	2016	Roger Steinkamp	DFL	14,756	36.21	Republican
25	Dave Senjem	Republican	2002	Dave Senjem	Republican	25,021	51.21	Republican
25	Dave Senjem	Republican	2002	Sara Flick	DFL	23,783	48.68	Republican
26	Carla Nelson	Republican	2010	Carla Nelson	Republican	24,740	50.86	Republican
26	Carla Nelson	Republican	2010	Aleta Borrud	DFL	23,831	48.99	Republican
27	Dan Sparks	DFL	2002	Gene Dornink	Republican	19,759	48.87	Republican
27	Dan Sparks	DFL	2002	Dan Sparks	DFL	17,941	44.37	Republican
27	Dan Sparks	DFL	2002	Tyler Becvar	LMN	2,699	6.68	Republican
28	Jeremy Miller	Republican	2010	Jeremy Miller	Republican	24,811	57.66	Republican
28	Jeremy Miller	Republican	2010	Sarah Kruger	DFL	18,171	42.23	Republican
29	Bruce Anderson	Republican	2012	Bruce Anderson	Republican	30,405	63.23	Republican
29	Bruce Anderson	Republican	2012	Chris Brazelton	DFL	13,572	28.23	Republican
29	Bruce Anderson	Republican	2012	Mary Murphy	Grassroots	4,066	8.46	Republican
30	Mary Kiffmeyer	Republican	2012	Mary Kiffmeyer	Republican	34,714	67.25	Republican
30	Mary Kiffmeyer	Republican	2012	Diane Nguyen	DFL	16,861	32.66	Republican
31	Michelle Benson	Republican	2010	Michelle Benson	Republican	35,980	70.57	Republican
31	Michelle Benson	Republican	2010	Kate Luthner	DFL	14,962	29.34	Republican
32	Mark Koran	Republican	2016	Mark Koran	Republican	32,493	66.35	Republican
32	Mark Koran	Republican	2016	Joshua Fike	DFL	16,412	33.51	Republican
33	David Osmek	Republican	2012	David Osmek	Republican	31,614	53.97	Republican
33	David Osmek	Republican	2012	Gretchen Piper	DFL	26,928	45.97	Republican
34	Warren Limmer	Republican	1995	Warren Limmer	Republican	29,347	50.74	Republican
34	Warren Limmer	Republican	1995	Bonnie Westlin	DFL	28,443	49.18	Republican
35	Jim Abeler	Republican	2016	Jim Abeler	Republican	31,291	62.63	Republican
35	Jim Abeler	Republican	2016	David Nelson	DFL	18,622	37.27	Republican
36	John Hoffman	DFL	2012	John Hoffman	DFL	27,580	56.33	DFL
36	John Hoffman	DFL	2012	Karen Attia	Republican	21,319	43.55	DFL
37	Jerry Newton	DFL	2016	Jerry Newton	DFL	26,100	52.38	DFL
37	Jerry Newton	DFL	2016	Brad Sanford	Republican	23,659	47.48	DFL
38	Roger Chamberlain	Republican	2010	Roger Chamberlain	Republican	28,041	52.08	Republican
38	Roger Chamberlain	Republican	2010	Justin Stofferahn	DFL	25,755	47.83	Republican
39	Karin Housley	Republican	2012	Karin Housley	Republican	29,246	52.97	Republican
39	Karin Housley	Republican	2012	Josiah Hill	DFL	25,921	46.95	Republican
40	Chris Eaton	DFL	2011	Chris Eaton	DFL	24,291	71.46	DFL
40	Chris Eaton	DFL	2011	Robert Marvin	Republican	9,647	28.38	DFL
41	Carolyn Laine (Note: Retiring; not seeking re-election.)	DFL	2016	Mary Kunesh-Podein	DFL	29,967	66.85	DFL
41	Carolyn Laine	DFL	2016	Lucia Vogel	Republican	14,791	32.99	DFL
42	Jason Isaacson	DFL	2016	Jason Isaacson	DFL	29,645	58.71	DFL
42	Jason Isaacson	DFL	2016	Ben Schwanke	Republican	20,771	41.14	DFL
43	Chuck Wiger	DFL	1996	Chuck Wiger	DFL	26,345	56.20	DFL
43	Chuck Wiger	DFL	1996	Bob Zick	Republican	16,520	35.24	DFL
43	Chuck Wiger	DFL	1996	Doug Daubenspeck	Grassroots	3,950	8.43	DFL
44	Paul Anderson	Republican	2016	Ann Johnson Stewart	DFL	33,855	58.74	DFL
44	Paul Anderson	Republican	2016	Greg Pulles	Republican	23,756	41.22	DFL
45	Ann Rest	DFL	2000	Ann Rest	DFL	29,054	60.70	DFL
45	Ann Rest	DFL	2000	Roxana Bruins	Republican	14,040	29.33	DFL
45	Ann Rest	DFL	2000	Andy Schuler	LMN	4,729	9.88	DFL
46	Ron Latz	DFL	2006	Ron Latz	DFL	37,972	72.72	DFL
46	Ron Latz	DFL	2006	Bryan Björnson	Republican	14,189	27.17	DFL
47	Scott Jensen	Republican	2016	Julia Coleman	Republican	32,366	57.63	Republican
47	Scott Jensen	Republican	2016	Addie Miller	DFL	23,728	42.25	Republican
48	Steve Cwodzinski	DFL	2016	Steve Cwodzinski	DFL	29,985	58.15	DFL
48	Steve Cwodzinski	DFL	2016	Jeff Jiang	Republican	21,558	41.81	DFL
49	Melisa Franzen	DFL	2012	Melisa Franzen	DFL	36,149	62.77	DFL
49	Melisa Franzen	DFL	2012	Julie Dupré	Republican	21,403	37.16	DFL
50	Melissa Wiklund	DFL	2012	Melissa Wiklund	DFL	30,516	66.62	DFL
50	Melissa Wiklund	DFL	2012	Dean Mumbleau	Republican	15,243	33.28	DFL
51	Jim Carlson	DFL	2006 (Note: Lost re-election 2010. Elected again in 2012.)	Jim Carlson	DFL	30,719	61.23	DFL
51	Jim Carlson	DFL	2006	Doug Willetts	Republican	19,389	38.65	DFL
52	Matt Klein	DFL	2016	Matt Klein	DFL	29,730	60.58	DFL
52	Matt Klein	DFL	2016	Tomas Settell	Republican	19,291	39.31	DFL
53	Susan Kent	DFL	2012	Susan Kent	DFL	29,538	54.08	DFL
53	Susan Kent	DFL	2012	Mary Giuliani Stephens	Republican	25,024	45.82	DFL
54	Karla Bigham	DFL	2018	Karla Bigham	DFL	25,530	52.85	DFL
54	Karla Bigham	DFL	2018	Leilani Holmstadt	Republican	22,712	47.02	DFL
55	Eric Pratt	Republican	2012	Eric Pratt	Republican	31,082	61.61	Republican
55	Eric Pratt	Republican	2012	Sahra Odowa	DFL	19,322	38.30	Republican
56	Dan Hall	Republican	2010	Lindsey Port	DFL	26,071	53.01	DFL
56	Dan Hall	Republican	2010	Dan Hall	Republican	23,061	46.89	DFL
57	Greg Clausen	DFL	2012	Greg Clausen	DFL	30,897	56.41	DFL
57	Greg Clausen	DFL	2012	Jose Jimenez	Republican	23,825	43.50	DFL
58	Matt Little	DFL	2016	Zach Duckworth	Republican	29,020	55.01	Republican
58	Matt Little	DFL	2016	Matt Little	DFL	23,701	44.93	Republican
59	Bobby Joe Champion	DFL	2012	Bobby Joe Champion	DFL	33,810	82.06	DFL
59	Bobby Joe Champion	DFL	2012	Paul Anderson	Republican	7,300	17.72	DFL
60	Kari Dziedzic	DFL	2012	Kari Dziedzic	DFL	37,488	85.73	DFL
60	Kari Dziedzic	DFL	2012	Mary Holmberg	Republican	6,171	14.11	DFL
61	Scott Dibble	DFL	2002	Scott Dibble	DFL	49,050	84.78	DFL
61	Scott Dibble	DFL	2002	Jennifer Zielinski	Republican	8,727	15.08	DFL
62	Jeff Hayden	DFL	2011	Omar Fateh	DFL	33,103	88.99	DFL
62	Jeff Hayden	DFL	2011	Bruce Lundeen	Republican	3,947	10.61	DFL
63	Patricia Torres Ray	DFL	2006	Patricia Torres Ray	DFL	40,742	77.64	DFL
63	Patricia Torres Ray	DFL	2006	Diane Napper	Republican	8,231	15.69	DFL
63	Patricia Torres Ray	DFL	2006	Chris Wright	Grassroots	3,460	6.59	DFL
64	Dick Cohen	DFL	1986	Erin Murphy	DFL	40,174	78.68	DFL
64	Dick Cohen	DFL	1986	Sharon Anderson	Republican	7,471	14.63	DFL
64	Dick Cohen	DFL	1986	Patti McArdell	LMN	3,276	6.42	DFL
65	Sandy Pappas	DFL	1990	Sandy Pappas	DFL	31,463	81.47	DFL
65	Sandy Pappas	DFL	1990	Paul Holmgren	Republican	7,044	18.24	DFL
66	John Marty	DFL	1986	John Marty	DFL	31,867	76.90	DFL
66	John Marty	DFL	1986	Greg Copeland	Republican	9,482	22.88	DFL
67	Foung Hawj	DFL	2012	Foung Hawj	DFL	24,008	73.86	DFL
67	Foung Hawj	DFL	2012	Alexander Deputie	Republican	8,407	25.86	DFL

=== Seats changing parties ===
Party	Incumbent	District	First elected	Winner	Party
Republican	Jerry Relph	14	2016	Aric Putnam	DFL
Republican	Paul Anderson	44	2016	Ann Johnson Stewart	DFL
Republican	Dan Hall	56	2010	Lindsey Port	DFL
DFL	Dan Sparks	27	2002	Gene Dornink	Republican
DFL	Matt Little	58	2016	Zach Duckworth	Republican

== Post-election changes ==
On November 18, 2020, longtime DFL senators Thomas M. Bakk and David Tomassoni announced they would be leaving the DFL party and form their own "Independent Caucus" in the state senate. Majority Leader Paul Gazelka welcomed the move and promised to give both senators chairmanships on "prominent committees". This changed the senate composition to 34 Republicans, 31 Democrats, and two independents.

== See also ==
- 2020 Minnesota House of Representatives election
- 2020 Minnesota elections
- 2018 Minnesota gubernatorial election
- List of Minnesota state legislatures
