= 2016 Minnesota Senate election =

- November 8, 2016

All 67 seats in the Minnesota Senate 34 seats needed for a majority
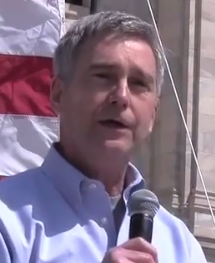

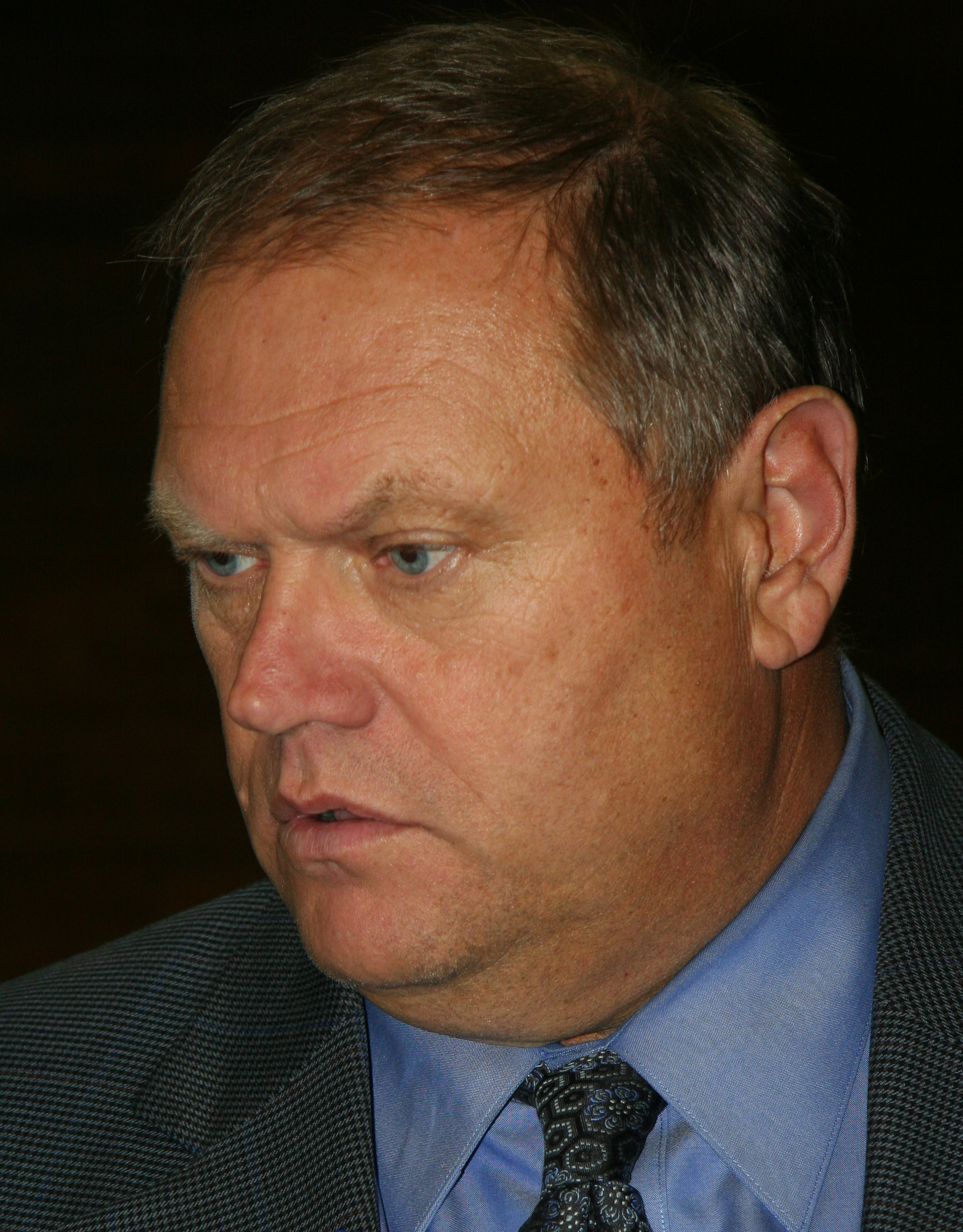
	Majority party	Minority party
Leader	David Hann (lost re-election)	Tom Bakk
Party	Republican	Democratic (DFL)
Leader since	November 9, 2012	November 4, 2010
Leader's seat	48th–Eden Prairie	3rd–Cook
Last election	28 seats, 43.49%	39 seats, 55.83%
Seats won	34	33
Seat change	▲6	▼6
Popular vote	1,377,128	1,409,775
Percentage	48.96	50.12
Swing	▲5.47 pp	▼5.71 pp
- Results: Republican hold Republican gain DFL hold DFL gain Vote share: 40–50% 50–60% 60–70% 70–80% 50–60% 60–70% 70–80% 80–90% >90%
Majority Leader before election
Tom Bakk
Democratic (DFL)
Elected Majority Leader
Paul Gazelka
Republican

The 2016 Minnesota Senate election was held in the U.S. state of Minnesota on November 8, 2016, to elect members to the Senate of the 90th and 91st Minnesota Legislatures. A primary election was held in several districts on August 9, 2016. The election coincided with the election of the other house of the Legislature, the House of Representatives.

The Republican Party of Minnesota won a majority of seats, defeating the majority of the Minnesota Democratic–Farmer–Labor Party (DFL). This was the first election for the DFL since it won a majority of seats in the 2012 election, after losing a majority to the Republicans in the 2010 election. The new Legislature convened on January 3, 2017.

== Background ==
The last election resulted in the Minnesota Democratic–Farmer–Labor Party (DFL) winning a majority of seats, after losing a majority to the Republican Party of Minnesota only two years earlier in the previous election. This resulted in the Republicans losing the only majority they have had since the return of partisan elections to the Senate in 1976. In conjunction with the result of the House election, it also resulted in the return of all-DFL control of the Legislature since 2010 as well as the return of all-party and all-DFL control of the Legislature and governorship since 1990, which ended with the election of a Republican majority to the House in 2014.

== Electoral system ==
The 67 members of the Senate were elected from single-member districts via first-past-the-post voting for four-year terms. Contested nominations of the DFL and Republican parties for each district were determined by an open primary election. Minor party and independent candidates were nominated by petition. Write-in candidates must have filed a request with the secretary of state's office for votes for them to have been counted.

== Retiring members ==
=== DFL ===
- Terri Bonoff, 44th
- Barb Goodwin, 41st
- Alice Johnson, 37th
- Jim Metzen, 52nd
  - Died of lung cancer on July 11, 2016.
- Roger Reinert, 7th
- Bev Scalze, 42nd
- Kathy Sheran, 19th
- Katie Sieben, 54th
- LeRoy Stumpf, 1st

=== Republican ===
- Dave Brown, 15th
- Julianne Ortman, 47th
- John Pederson, 14th
- Dave Thompson, 58th

== Predictions ==
Source	Ranking	As of
Governing	Lean D	October 12, 2016

=== Competitive districts ===
According to MinnPost, the Star Tribune, the Pioneer Press, and MPR News, a total of 19 districts were competitive. MinnPost considered 12 districts to be competitive—10 of which were held by the DFL and two by the Republicans, the Star Tribune 19—13 of which were held by the DFL and six by the Republicans, the Pioneer Press six—five of which were held by the DFL and one by the Republicans, and MPR News nine—seven of which were held by the DFL and two by the Republicans.

District	Incumbent	Party	First elected	2012 result	MinnPost (November 3, 2016)	Star Tribune (September 16, 2016)	Pioneer Press (October 18, 2016)	MPR News (September 22, 2016)	Result
1	LeRoy Stumpf‡	DFL	1982	60.59%	Yes	Yes	No	Yes	Republican gain
2	Rod Skoe	DFL	2002	54.92%	Yes	Yes	No	Yes	Republican gain
4	Kent Eken	DFL	2012	52.17%	No	Yes	No	No	Hold
14	John Pederson‡	Republican	2010	52.47%	Yes	Yes	No	Yes	Hold
17	Lyle Koenen	DFL	2012*	55.40%	Yes	Yes	No	Yes	Republican gain
20	Kevin Dahle	DFL	2008*, 2012†	50.02%	Yes	Yes	Yes	No	Republican gain
21	Matt Schmit	DFL	2012	52.43%	Yes	Yes	Yes	Yes	Republican gain
24	Vicki Jensen	DFL	2012	52.60%	Yes	Yes	No	Yes	Republican gain
26	Carla Nelson	Republican	2010	55.62%	No	Yes	No	No	Hold
32	Sean Nienow§	Republican	2002, 2010†	54.25%	No	Yes	No	No	Hold
36	John Hoffman	DFL	2012	53.10%	Yes	Yes	Yes	Yes	Hold
37	Alice Johnson‡	DFL	2012	53.23%	Yes	Yes	No	No	Hold
44	Terri Bonoff‡	DFL	2005*	55.81%	Yes	Yes	Yes	Yes	Republican gain
48	David Hann	Republican	2002	51.32%	Yes	Yes	Yes	Yes	DFL gain
49	Melisa Franzen	DFL	2012	52.74%	No	Yes	No	No	Hold
53	Susan Kent	DFL	2012	52.13%	No	Yes	No	No	Hold
56	Dan Hall	Republican	2010	53.92%	No	Yes	No	No	Hold
57	Greg Clausen	DFL	2012	54.09%	Yes	Yes	Yes	No	Hold
58	Dave Thompson‡	Republican	2010	57.60%	No	Yes	No	No	DFL gain

*Elected in a special election.
†Elected to non-consecutive terms.
‡Retired; did not seek re-election.
§Lost primary election for party's nomination.

== Primary elections results ==
District	Party	Candidates	Votes	%
1	Republican	Mark Johnson	2,561	83.99
1	Republican	Edwin Dale Hahn	488	16.01
1	DFL	Kip Fontaine	2,369	77.47
1	DFL	Jual Carlson	689	22.53
5	Republican	Justin Eichorn	1,485	73.26
5	Republican	Pedie Pederson	542	26.74
5	DFL	Tom Saxhaug	2,140	100.00
15	Republican	Andrew Mathews	1,938	63.92
15	Republican	Dan Whitcomb	1,094	36.08
15	DFL	Chilah Brown	657	58.71
15	DFL	Rob Passons	462	41.29
23	Republican	Julie Rosen	2,706	100.00
23	DFL	Barbara Lake	967	67.96
23	DFL	John Lillis	456	32.04
24	Republican	John Jasinski	983	100.00
24	DFL	Vicki Jensen	1,430	89.77
24	DFL	Rich Bailey	163	10.23
27	Republican	Gene Dornink	948	69.15
27	Republican	Cynthia Gail	423	30.85
27	DFL	Dan Sparks	1,379	100.00
32	Republican	Mark Koran	1,709	63.39
32	Republican	Sean Nienow	987	36.61
32	DFL	Tim Nelson	964	100.00
52	Republican	Mark Misukanis	2,482	100.00
52	DFL	Matt Klein	3,678	69.21
52	DFL	Todd Podgorski	1,636	30.79
53	Republican	Sharna Wahlgren	745	65.81
53	Republican	Bill Dahn	387	34.19
53	DFL	Susan Kent	2,290	100.00
59	Republican	Jennifer Carnahan	293	100.00
59	DFL	Bobby Joe Champion	4,020	81.99
59	DFL	Patwin Lawrence	883	18.01
62	Republican	Bruce Lundeen	165	100.00
62	DFL	Jeff Hayden	3,711	72.85
62	DFL	Mohamoud Hassan	1,383	27.15
64	Republican	Ian Baird	461	64.48
64	Republican	Sharon Anderson	254	35.52
64	DFL	Dick Cohen	8,213	100.00

Source: Minnesota Secretary of State

== Opinion polling ==
Polling firm	Polling period	Sample size	Margin of error	DFL	Republican	Undecided
Public Policy Polling	July 30 – August 2, 2015	1,015 RV	±3.1 pp	46%	40%	15%

== Results ==
Districts won

Summary of the November 8, 2016, Minnesota Senate election results
Party	Candidates	Votes			Seats		
Party	Candidates	No.	%	∆pp	No.	∆No.	%
Republican Party of Minnesota	65	1,377,128	48.96	▲5.47	34	▲6	50.75
Minnesota Democratic–Farmer–Labor Party	67	1,409,775	50.12	▼5.71	33	▼6	49.25
Legal Marijuana Now Party	1	8,861	0.32	▲0.32	0	Steady	0.00
Libertarian Party of Minnesota	3	7,899	0.28	▲0.28	0	Steady	0.00
Independence Party of Minnesota	1	3,197	0.11	▼0.11	0	Steady	0.00
Write-in	N/A	5,964	0.21	▼0.05	0	Steady	0.00
Total		2,812,824	100.00	±0.00	67	±0	100.00
Invalid/blank votes		155,457	5.24	▼1.77			
Turnout (out of 3,972,330 eligible voters)		2,968,281	74.72	▼1.70			
Source: Minnesota Secretary of State, Minnesota Legislative Reference Library

=== District results ===
District	Incumbent			Candidates				
District	Name	Party	First elected	Name	Party	Votes	%	Winner Party
1	LeRoy Stumpf‡	DFL	1982	Mark Johnson	Republican	23,108	61.41	Republican
1	LeRoy Stumpf‡	DFL	1982	Kip Fontaine	DFL	14,501	38.54	Republican
2	Rod Skoe	DFL	2002	Paul Utke	Republican	22,232	56.60	Republican
2	Rod Skoe	DFL	2002	Rod Skoe	DFL	17,002	43.29	Republican
3	Tom Bakk	DFL	2002	Tom Bakk	DFL	26,977	61.36	DFL
3	Tom Bakk	DFL	2002	Jennifer Havlick	Republican	16,923	38.49	DFL
4	Kent Eken	DFL	2012	Kent Eken	DFL	21,420	55.13	DFL
4	Kent Eken	DFL	2012	James Leiman	Republican	17,382	44.74	DFL
5	Tom Saxhaug	DFL	2002	Justin Eichorn	Republican	20,240	50.59	Republican
5	Tom Saxhaug	DFL	2002	Tom Saxhaug	DFL	19,687	49.21	Republican
6	David Tomassoni	DFL	2000	David Tomassoni	DFL	26,260	62.69	DFL
6	David Tomassoni	DFL	2000	Skeeter Tomczak	Republican	15,555	37.13	DFL
7	Roger Reinert‡	DFL	2010	Erik Simonson	DFL	27,677	65.50	DFL
7	Roger Reinert‡	DFL	2010	Donna Bergstrom	Republican	14,470	34.25	DFL
8	Bill Ingebrigtsen	Republican	2006	Bill Ingebrigtsen	Republican	29,302	66.26	Republican
8	Bill Ingebrigtsen	Republican	2006	Shawn Olson	DFL	14,892	33.67	Republican
9	Paul Gazelka	Republican	2010	Paul Gazelka	Republican	27,749	71.19	Republican
9	Paul Gazelka	Republican	2010	Jason Weinerman	DFL	11,191	28.71	Republican
10	Carrie Ruud	Republican	2002, 2012†	Carrie Ruud	Republican	27,923	64.31	Republican
10	Carrie Ruud	Republican	2002, 2012†	Tiffany Stenglein	DFL	15,440	35.56	Republican
11	Tony Lourey	DFL	2006	Tony Lourey	DFL	20,519	54.50	DFL
11	Tony Lourey	DFL	2006	Michael Cummins	Republican	17,079	45.36	DFL
12	Torrey Westrom	Republican	2012	Torrey Westrom	Republican	28,254	67.60	Republican
12	Torrey Westrom	Republican	2012	Russ Hinrichs	DFL	13,515	32.34	Republican
13	Michelle Fischbach	Republican	1996*	Michelle Fischbach	Republican	29,235	68.60	Republican
13	Michelle Fischbach	Republican	1996*	Michael Willemsen	DFL	13,338	31.30	Republican
14	John Pederson‡	Republican	2010	Jerry Relph	Republican	17,519	47.40	Republican
14	John Pederson‡	Republican	2010	Dan Wolgamott	DFL	17,378	47.02	Republican
14	John Pederson‡	Republican	2010	Steven Zilberg	Libertarian	2,021	5.47	Republican
15	Dave Brown‡	Republican	2010	Andrew Mathews	Republican	28,373	70.70	Republican
15	Dave Brown‡	Republican	2010	Chilah Brown	DFL	11,672	29.08	Republican
16	Gary Dahms	Republican	2010	Gary Dahms	Republican	26,086	67.29	Republican
16	Gary Dahms	Republican	2010	James Kanne	DFL	12,651	32.63	Republican
17	Lyle Koenen	DFL	2012*	Andrew Lang	Republican	22,421	57.25	Republican
17	Lyle Koenen	DFL	2012*	Lyle Koenen	DFL	16,713	42.67	Republican
18	Scott Newman	Republican	2010	Scott Newman	Republican	26,341	66.64	Republican
18	Scott Newman	Republican	2010	Amy Wilde	DFL	13,148	33.26	Republican
19	Kathy Sheran‡	DFL	2006	Nick Frentz	DFL	22,875	56.11	DFL
19	Kathy Sheran‡	DFL	2006	Willa Dailey	Republican	15,057	36.93	DFL
19	Kathy Sheran‡	DFL	2006	Shane Wernsing	Libertarian	2,798	6.86	DFL
20	Kevin Dahle	DFL	2008*, 2012†	Rich Draheim	Republican	22,274	51.91	Republican
20	Kevin Dahle	DFL	2008*, 2012†	Kevin Dahle	DFL	20,577	47.95	Republican
21	Matt Schmit	DFL	2012	Mike Goggin	Republican	22,901	54.24	Republican
21	Matt Schmit	DFL	2012	Matt Schmit	DFL	19,282	45.67	Republican
22	Bill Weber	Republican	2012	Bill Weber	Republican	25,769	70.20	Republican
22	Bill Weber	Republican	2012	Brian Abrahamson	DFL	10,910	29.72	Republican
23	Julie Rosen	Republican	2002	Julie Rosen	Republican	28,063	70.81	Republican
23	Julie Rosen	Republican	2002	Barbara Lake	DFL	11,529	29.09	Republican
24	Vicki Jensen	DFL	2012	John Jasinski	Republican	21,885	58.52	Republican
24	Vicki Jensen	DFL	2012	Vicki Jensen	DFL	15,463	41.35	Republican
25	Dave Senjem	Republican	2002	Dave Senjem	Republican	26,839	63.24	Republican
25	Dave Senjem	Republican	2002	Dale Amorosia	DFL	15,555	36.65	Republican
26	Carla Nelson	Republican	2010	Carla Nelson	Republican	23,325	55.96	Republican
26	Carla Nelson	Republican	2010	Rich Wright	DFL	18,317	43.95	Republican
27	Dan Sparks	DFL	2002	Dan Sparks	DFL	20,540	54.76	DFL
27	Dan Sparks	DFL	2002	Gene Dornink	Republican	16,944	45.17	DFL
28	Jeremy Miller	Republican	2010	Jeremy Miller	Republican	25,217	62.97	Republican
28	Jeremy Miller	Republican	2010	Jon Pieper	DFL	14,793	36.94	Republican
29	Bruce Anderson	Republican	2012	Bruce Anderson	Republican	27,249	66.00	Republican
29	Bruce Anderson	Republican	2012	Janice Holter Kittok	DFL	13,992	33.89	Republican
30	Mary Kiffmeyer	Republican	2012	Mary Kiffmeyer	Republican	30,483	71.71	Republican
30	Mary Kiffmeyer	Republican	2012	P.J. LaCroix	DFL	11,979	28.18	Republican
31	Michelle Benson	Republican	2010	Michelle Benson	Republican	29,650	67.96	Republican
31	Michelle Benson	Republican	2010	Ricky Englund	DFL	13,919	31.91	Republican
32	Sean Nienow§	Republican	2002, 2010†	Mark Koran	Republican	23,992	56.53	Republican
32	Sean Nienow§	Republican	2002, 2010†	Tim Nelson	DFL	18,388	43.33	Republican
33	David Osmek	Republican	2012	David Osmek	Republican	30,175	59.59	Republican
33	David Osmek	Republican	2012	Sherrie Pugh	DFL	17,335	34.24	Republican
33	David Osmek	Republican	2012	Jay Nygard	Libertarian	3,080	6.08	Republican
34	Warren Limmer	Republican	1995*	Warren Limmer	Republican	29,229	60.18	Republican
34	Warren Limmer	Republican	1995*	Bonnie Westlin	DFL	19,263	39.66	Republican
35	Jim Abeler	Republican	2016*	Jim Abeler	Republican	29,655	67.47	Republican
35	Jim Abeler	Republican	2016*	Roger Johnson	DFL	14,216	32.35	Republican
36	John Hoffman	DFL	2012	John Hoffman	DFL	21,793	51.00	DFL
36	John Hoffman	DFL	2012	Jeff Lunde	Republican	20,840	48.77	DFL
37	Alice Johnson‡	DFL	2012	Jerry Newton	DFL	22,129	51.41	DFL
37	Alice Johnson‡	DFL	2012	Brad Sanford	Republican	20,838	48.41	DFL
38	Roger Chamberlain	Republican	2010	Roger Chamberlain	Republican	27,109	58.61	Republican
38	Roger Chamberlain	Republican	2010	Pat Davern	DFL	19,094	41.28	Republican
39	Karin Housley	Republican	2012	Karin Housley	Republican	28,960	61.29	Republican
39	Karin Housley	Republican	2012	Sten Hakanson	DFL	18,237	38.60	Republican
40	Chris Eaton	DFL	2011*	Chris Eaton	DFL	21,152	67.84	DFL
40	Chris Eaton	DFL	2011*	Robert Marvin	Republican	9,905	31.77	DFL
41	Barb Goodwin‡	DFL	2010	Carolyn Laine	DFL	25,096	61.04	DFL
41	Barb Goodwin‡	DFL	2010	Gary Johnson	Republican	15,939	38.77	DFL
42	Bev Scalze‡	DFL	2012	Jason Isaacson	DFL	24,962	54.21	DFL
42	Bev Scalze‡	DFL	2012	Candy Sina	Republican	21,008	45.62	DFL
43	Chuck Wiger	DFL	1996	Chuck Wiger	DFL	24,347	56.95	DFL
43	Chuck Wiger	DFL	1996	Bob Zick	Republican	15,149	35.43	DFL
43	Chuck Wiger	DFL	1996	Chris Belflower	Independence	3,197	7.48	DFL
44	Terri Bonoff‡	DFL	2005*	Paul Anderson	Republican	25,309	50.13	Republican
44	Terri Bonoff‡	DFL	2005*	Deb Calvert	DFL	25,114	49.74	Republican
45	Ann Rest	DFL	2000	Ann Rest	DFL	27,509	63.66	DFL
45	Ann Rest	DFL	2000	Roxana Bruins	Republican	15,588	36.07	DFL
46	Ron Latz	DFL	2006	Ron Latz	DFL	35,465	96.58	DFL
47	Julianne Ortman‡	Republican	2002	Scott Jensen	Republican	30,920	67.29	Republican
47	Julianne Ortman‡	Republican	2002	Darryl Scarborough	DFL	14,981	32.60	Republican
48	David Hann	Republican	2002	Steve Cwodzinski	DFL	24,303	51.10	DFL
48	David Hann	Republican	2002	David Hann	Republican	23,205	48.79	DFL
49	Melisa Franzen	DFL	2012	Melisa Franzen	DFL	28,273	54.47	DFL
49	Melisa Franzen	DFL	2012	Mike Lehmann	Republican	23,557	45.39	DFL
50	Melissa Halvorson Wiklund	DFL	2012	Melissa Halvorson Wiklund	DFL	24,921	59.53	DFL
50	Melissa Halvorson Wiklund	DFL	2012	Kirsten Johnson	Republican	16,805	40.14	DFL
51	Jim Carlson	DFL	2006, 2012†	Jim Carlson	DFL	24,358	54.04	DFL
51	Jim Carlson	DFL	2006, 2012†	Victor Lake	Republican	20,662	45.84	DFL
52	Jim Metzen (Note: Died of lung cancer on July 11, 2016.)	DFL	1986	Matt Klein	DFL	25,448	57.84	DFL
52	Jim Metzen	DFL	1986	Mark Misukanis	Republican	18,485	42.01	DFL
53	Susan Kent	DFL	2012	Susan Kent	DFL	23,035	50.38	DFL
53	Susan Kent	DFL	2012	Sharna Wahlgren	Republican	22,636	49.51	DFL
54	Katie Sieben‡	DFL	2006	Dan Schoen	DFL	22,162	53.13	DFL
54	Katie Sieben‡	DFL	2006	Leilani Holmstadt	Republican	19,480	46.70	DFL
55	Eric Pratt	Republican	2012	Eric Pratt	Republican	29,132	68.53	Republican
55	Eric Pratt	Republican	2012	Ali Ali	DFL	13,282	31.24	Republican
56	Dan Hall	Republican	2010	Dan Hall	Republican	23,602	55.07	Republican
56	Dan Hall	Republican	2010	Phil Sterner	DFL	19,178	44.75	Republican
57	Greg Clausen	DFL	2012	Greg Clausen	DFL	24,519	53.06	DFL
57	Greg Clausen	DFL	2012	Cory Campbell	Republican	21,633	46.81	DFL
58	Dave Thompson‡	Republican	2010	Matt Little	DFL	22,833	50.38	DFL
58	Dave Thompson‡	Republican	2010	Tim Pitcher	Republican	22,446	49.53	DFL
59	Bobby Joe Champion	DFL	2012	Bobby Joe Champion	DFL	27,541	77.56	DFL
59	Bobby Joe Champion	DFL	2012	Jennifer Carnahan	Republican	7,814	22.01	DFL
60	Kari Dziedzic	DFL	2012*	Kari Dziedzic	DFL	31,542	77.53	DFL
60	Kari Dziedzic	DFL	2012*	Martin Super	Legal; Marijuana; Now	8,861	21.78	DFL
61	Scott Dibble	DFL	2002	Scott Dibble	DFL	43,045	81.07	DFL
61	Scott Dibble	DFL	2002	Bob Carney	Republican	9,924	18.69	DFL
62	Jeff Hayden	DFL	2011*	Jeff Hayden	DFL	29,564	87.84	DFL
62	Jeff Hayden	DFL	2011*	Bruce Lundeen	Republican	3,897	11.58	DFL
63	Patricia Torres Ray	DFL	2006	Patricia Torres Ray	DFL	38,470	80.70	DFL
63	Patricia Torres Ray	DFL	2006	Ron Moey	Republican	9,068	19.02	DFL
64	Dick Cohen	DFL	1986	Dick Cohen	DFL	36,757	76.67	DFL
64	Dick Cohen	DFL	1986	Ian Baird	Republican	11,078	23.11	DFL
65	Sandy Pappas	DFL	1990	Sandy Pappas	DFL	27,743	80.70	DFL
65	Sandy Pappas	DFL	1990	Jason Delmont	Republican	6,479	18.85	DFL
66	John Marty	DFL	1986	John Marty	DFL	28,312	74.34	DFL
66	John Marty	DFL	1986	Carolyn Jass	Republican	9,670	25.39	DFL
67	Foung Hawj	DFL	2012	Foung Hawj	DFL	21,696	75.11	DFL
67	Foung Hawj	DFL	2012	Krysia Weidell	Republican	7,091	24.55	DFL

*Elected in a special election.
†Elected to non-consecutive terms.
‡Retired; did not seek re-election.
§Lost primary election for party's nomination.

Withdrawn candidates

The following sought election but later withdrew.

District	Candidates	Party
1	Jual Carlson	Republican
1	Sue Grafstrom	Republican
1	Alan Jensen	Republican
1	Roger Schmitz	Republican
1	Gary Willhite	Republican
7	Sharla Gardner	DFL
14	Jeff Johnson	Republican
15	Brad Schumaker	Republican
19	Mark Friedman	DFL
20	Mark Bartusek	Republican
20	Bruce Morlan	Republican
20	Danny Petricka	Republican
24	Janet Moline	Republican
26	Elliot Culp	DFL
41	Connie Bernardy	DFL
44	Cole Mathisen	Republican
44	Kelli Slavik	Republican
44	Sharon Sund	DFL
47	Jake Coleman	Republican
48	Joan Howe-Pullis	DFL
52	Maureen Ramirez	DFL
54	Lynn Kaye	Republican
58	Mike Freundschuh	Republican
58	Mark Priore	Republican
58	Melissa Sauser	Republican
60	Chris Meyer	DFL

=== Seats changing parties ===
Party	Incumbent	District	First elected	Winner	Party
DFL	LeRoy Stumpf‡	1	1982	Mark Johnson	Republican
DFL	Rod Skoe	2	2002	Paul Utke	Republican
DFL	Tom Saxhaug	5	2002	Justin Eichorn	Republican
DFL	Lyle Koenen	17	2012*	Andrew Lang	Republican
DFL	Kevin Dahle	20	2008*, 2012†	Rich Draheim	Republican
DFL	Matt Schmit	21	2012	Mike Goggin	Republican
DFL	Vicki Jensen	24	2012	John Jasinski	Republican
DFL	Terri Bonoff‡	44	2005*	Paul Anderson	Republican
Republican	David Hann	48	2002	Steve Cwodzinski	DFL
Republican	Dave Thompson‡	58	2010	Matt Little	DFL

*Elected in a special election.
†Elected to non-consecutive terms.
‡Retired; did not seek re-election.

== See also ==
- Minnesota House of Representatives election, 2016
- Minnesota elections, 2016
- Minnesota gubernatorial election, 2014
