= 2012 Minnesota Senate election =

- November 6, 2012

All 67 seats in the Minnesota Senate 34 seats needed for a majority
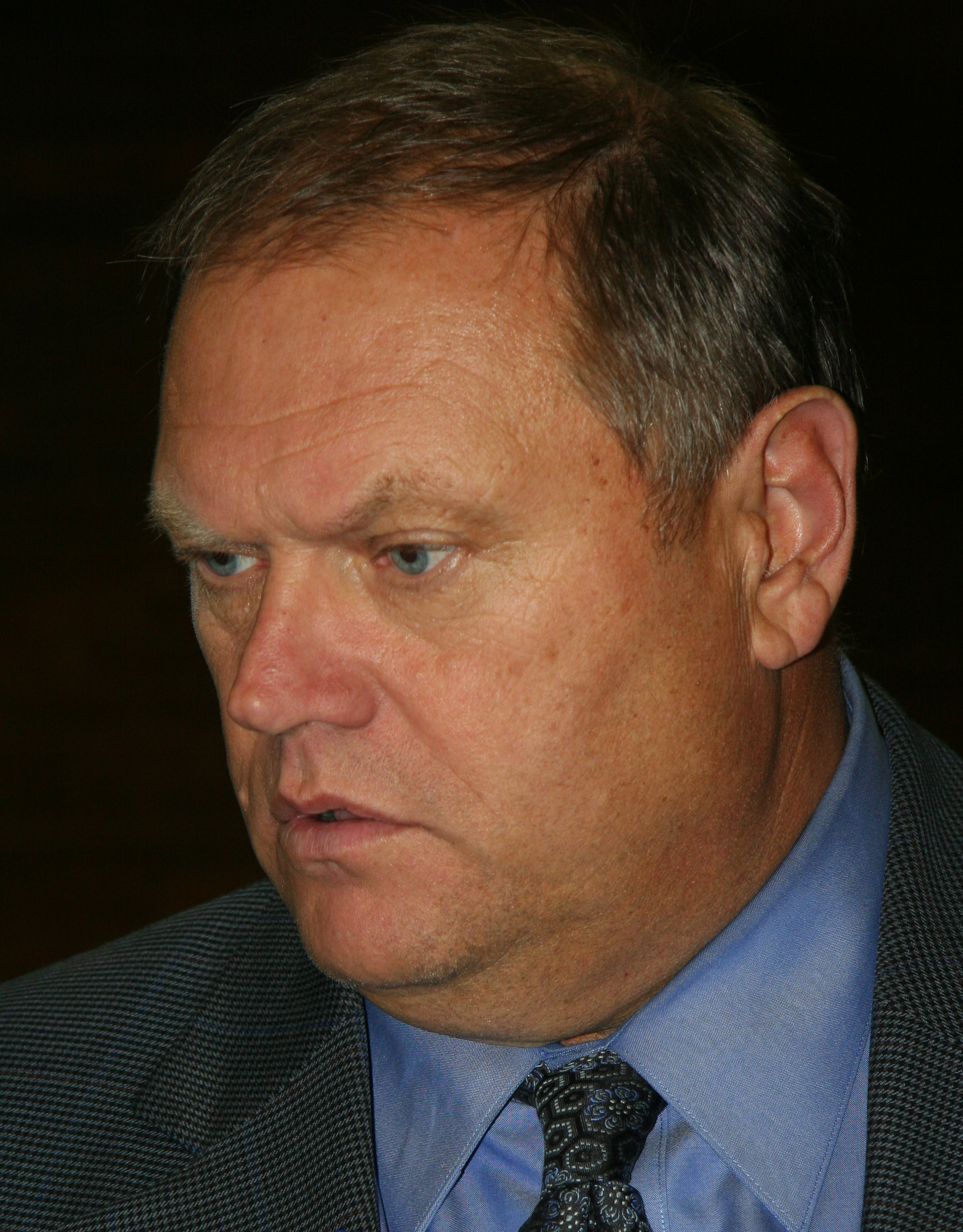

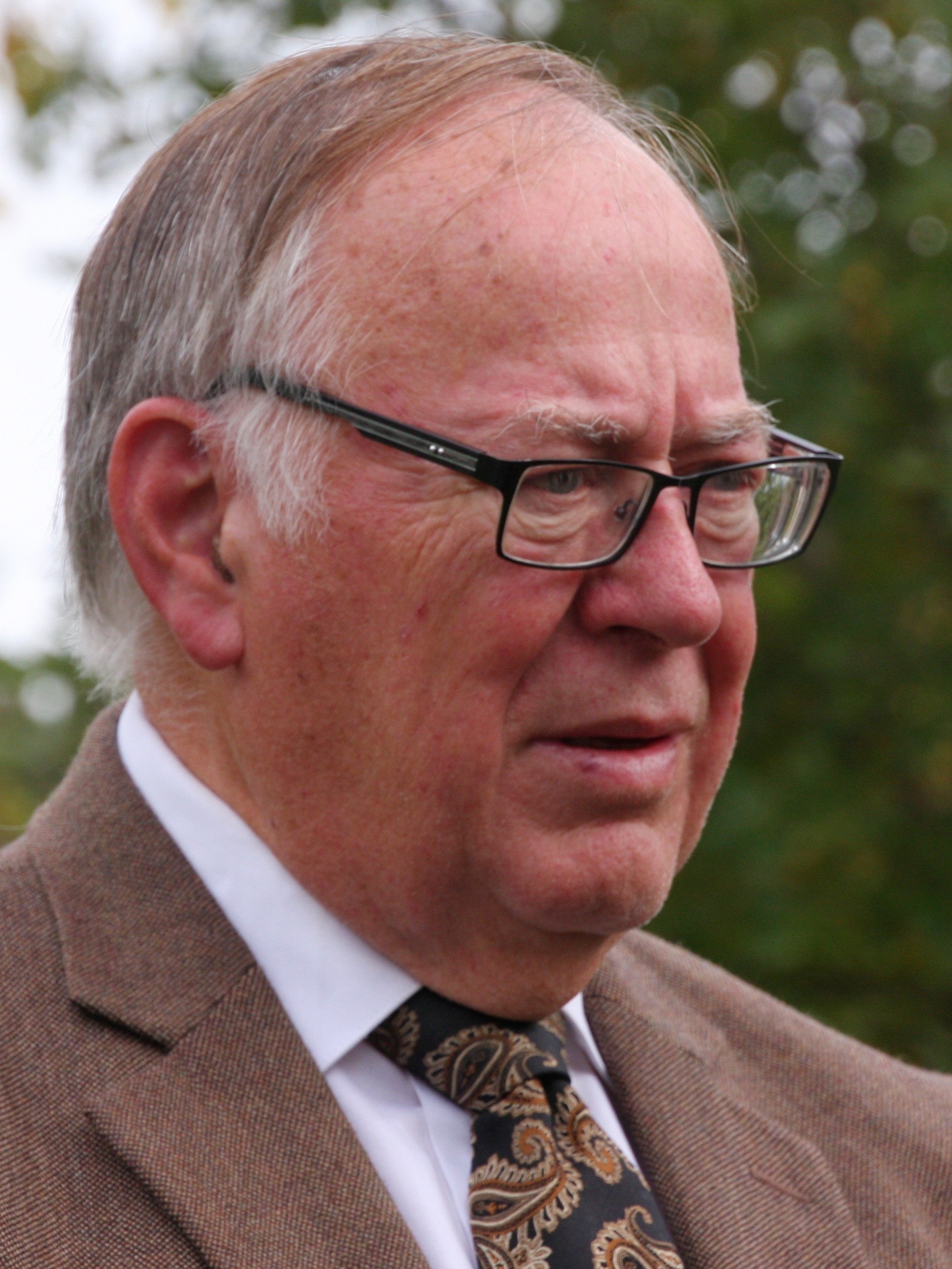
	Majority party	Minority party
Leader	Tom Bakk	Dave Senjem
Party	Democratic (DFL)	Republican
Leader since	November 4, 2010	December 27, 2011
Leader's seat	3rd–Cook	25th–Rochester
Last election	30 seats, 48.91%	37 seats, 49.72%
Seats won	39	28
Seat change	▲9	▼9
Popular vote	1,532,065	1,193,356
Percentage	55.83%	43.49%
Swing	▲6.92 pp	▼6.23 pp
- Results: DFL hold DFL gain Republican hold Republican gain Vote share: 50–60% 60–70% 70–80% 80–90% >90% 50–60% 60–70%
Majority Leader before election
Dave Senjem
Republican
Elected Majority Leader
Tom Bakk
Democratic (DFL)

The 2012 Minnesota Senate election was held in the U.S. state of Minnesota on November 6, 2012, to elect members to the Senate of the 88th and 89th Minnesota Legislatures. A primary election was held in several districts on August 14, 2012.

The Minnesota Democratic–Farmer–Labor Party (DFL) won a majority of seats, defeating the majority of the Republican Party of Minnesota.

The new Legislature convened on January 8, 2013.

== Special elections ==
=== District 59 ===
A special election was held on January 12, 2012 to fill Senate district 59, which had been vacated by the resignation of DFLer Larry Pogemiller, who had been appointed to the Minnesota Office of Higher Education. DFL nominee Kari Dziedzic defeated Republican Ben Schwanke by a wide margin.

Senate District 59 Special Democratic-Farmer-Labor primary
Party	Candidate	Votes	%
Democratic (DFL)	Kari Dziedzic	1,965	32.11
Democratic (DFL)	Mohamud Noor	1,626	26.57
Democratic (DFL)	Peter Wagenius	1,089	17.80
Democratic (DFL)	Paul Ostrow	792	12.94
Democratic (DFL)	Jacob Frey	473	7.73
Democratic (DFL)	Alicia Frosch	36	0.59
Total votes		5,981	100.0

Senate district 59 Special Election
Party	Candidate	Votes	%
Democratic (DFL)	Kari Dziedzic	3,393	79.41
Republican	Ben Schwanke	824	19.28
Write-in		56	1.31
Total votes		4,273	100.0

=== District 20 ===
A special election was held on April 20, 2012 to fill Senate district 20, which had been vacated by the death of DFLer Gary Kubly. DFL nominee Lyle Koenen defeated Republican Gregg Kulberg by a 14-point margin.

Senate District 20 Special Democratic-Farmer-Labor primary
Party	Candidate	Votes	%
Democratic (DFL)	Lyle Koenen	1,874	66.43
Democratic (DFL)	John Schultz	947	33.57
Total votes		2,821	100.0

Senate district 20 Special Election
Party	Candidate	Votes	%
Democratic (DFL)	Lyle Koenen	3,914	54.41
Republican	Gregg Kulberg	2,912	40.48
Independence	Leon Greenslit	364	5.06
Write-in		3	0.04
Total votes		7,193	100.0

== Primary election results ==
District	Party	Candidates	Votes	%
1	Republican	Steve Nordhagen	1,574	72.77
1	Republican	Jual Carlson	589	27.23
1	DFL	LeRoy Stumpf	3,218	100.00
5	Republican	John Carlson	2,654	100.00
5	DFL	Tom Saxhaug	3,981	72.39
5	DFL	Laverne Pederson	1,518	27.61
10	Republican	Carrie Ruud	2,350	100.00
10	DFL	Taylor Stevenson	2,873	57.38
10	DFL	Anne Marcotte	2,134	42.62
13	Republican	Michelle Fischbach	1,484	90.27
13	Republican	Fadumo Yusuf	160	9.73
13	DFL	Peggy Boeck	765	100.00
15	Republican	Dave Brown	1,725	100.00
15	DFL	Sally Knox	1,183	62.56
15	DFL	Ron Thiessen	708	37.44
17	Republican	Joe Gimse	1,490	100.00
17	DFL	Lyle Koenen	3,019	57.20
17	DFL	Larry Rice	2,259	42.80
20	Republican	Mike Dudley	2,590	86.62
20	Republican	Gene Thomas Kornder	400	13.38
20	DFL	Kevin Dahle	2,323	100.00
30	Republican	Mary Kiffmeyer	1,620	73.44
30	Republican	Paul Bolin	586	26.56
30	DFL	Paul Perovich	806	100.00
33	Republican	David Osmek	2,885	50.94
33	Republican	Connie Doepke	2,778	49.06
33	DFL	Judy Rogosheske	1,187	100.00
39	Republican	Karin Housley	1,941	67.26
39	Republican	Eric Michael Langness	945	32.74
39	DFL	Julie Bunn	2,235	100.00
40	DFL	Chris Eaton	2,005	81.01
40	DFL	Timothy Davis	470	18.99
45	Republican	Blair Tremere	978	54.36
45	Republican	Timothy Hall	821	45.64
45	DFL	Ann Rest	3,851	100.00
46	Republican	Paul Scofield	544	56.43
46	Republican	Roger Champagne	420	43.57
46	DFL	Ron Latz	3,205	100.00
47	Republican	Julianne Ortman	2,114	58.43
47	Republican	Bruce Schwichtenberg	1,504	41.57
47	DFL	James Weygand	824	100.00
55	Republican	Eric Pratt	1,666	100.00
55	DFL	Kathy Busch	1,059	87.52
55	DFL	Josh Ondich	151	12.48
57	Republican	Pat Hall	1,937	100.00
57	DFL	Greg Clausen	1,456	78.66
57	DFL	Mike Germain	395	21.34
64	Republican	Sharon Anderson	632	100.00
64	DFL	Dick Cohen	5,797	89.43
64	DFL	Alexander Jeffries	685	10.57
67	Republican	Mike Capistrant	425	100.00
67	DFL	Foung Hawj	2,142	44.21
67	DFL	Robert Humphrey	1,897	39.15
67	DFL	Tom Dimond	806	16.64

Source: Minnesota Secretary of State

== General election ==
=== Opinion polling ===
Polling firm/client	Polling period	Sample size	Margin of error (pp)	Republican	DFL	Independence	Other	Undecided
SurveyUSA/KSTP-TV	November 1–3, 2012	556 LV	±4.2	40%	48%	6%	6%	1%
SurveyUSA/KSTP-TV	October 26–28, 2012	574 LV	±4.2	40%	45%	8%	6%	1%
SurveyUSA/KSTP-TV	October 12–14, 2012	550 LV	±4.3	36%	45%	8%	3%	9%
Public Policy Polling	October 5–8, 2012	937 LV	±3.2	40%	52%	—	—	8%
Public Policy Polling	September 10–11, 2012	824 LV	±3.4	44%	47%	—	—	9%
SurveyUSA/KSTP-TV	September 6–9, 2012	551 LV	±4.3	38%	45%	6%	3%	9%
SurveyUSA/KSTP-TV	July 17–19, 2012	552 LV	±4.3	40%	45%	8%	2%	6%
Public Policy Polling	May 31 – June 3, 2012	973	±3.1	36%	48%	—	—	16%
Public Policy Polling	January 21–22, 2012	1,236	±2.8	39%	48%	—	—	14%
Public Policy Polling	May 27–30, 2011	1,179	±2.9	40%	49%	—	—	11%

=== Predictions ===
Source	Ranking	As of
Governing	Tossup	October 24, 2012

== Results ==
Districts won

Summary of the November 6, 2012 Minnesota Senate election results
Party	Candidates	Votes			Seats		
Party	Candidates	No.	%	∆pp	No.	∆No.	%
Minnesota Democratic–Farmer–Labor Party	67	1,532,065	55.83	▲6.92	39	▲9	58.21
Republican Party of Minnesota	63	1,193,356	43.49	▼6.23	28	▼9	41.79
Independence Party of Minnesota	2	6,102	0.22	▼0.47	0	Steady	0.00
Independent	1	5,196	0.19	▼0.12	0	Steady	0.00
Write-in	N/A	7,251	0.26	▼0.07	0	Steady	0.00
Total		2,743,970	100.00	±0.00	67	±0	100.00
Invalid/blank votes		206,810	7.01	▲3.78			
Turnout (out of 3,861,043 eligible voters)		2,950,780	76.42	▲20.59			
Source: Minnesota Secretary of State, Minnesota Legislative Reference Library

=== District results ===
District	Candidates	Party	Votes	%	Winner Party
1	LeRoy Stumpf	DFL	22,298	60.59	DFL
1	Steve Nordhagen	Republican	14,475	39.33	DFL
2	Rod Skoe	DFL	21,269	54.92	DFL
2	Dennis Moser	Republican	17,423	44.99	DFL
3	Tom Bakk	DFL	28,427	64.59	DFL
3	Jennifer Havlick	Republican	15,509	35.24	DFL
4	Kent Eken	DFL	19,833	52.17	DFL
4	Phil Hansen	Republican	18,132	47.70	DFL
5	Tom Saxhaug	DFL	21,301	52.33	DFL
5	John Carlson	Republican	19,362	47.56	DFL
6	David Tomassoni	DFL	30,882	71.58	DFL
6	Brandon Anderson	Republican	12,220	28.32	DFL
7	Roger Reinert	DFL	32,684	76.90	DFL
7	Tyler Verry	Republican	9,621	22.64	DFL
8	Bill Ingebrigtsen	Republican	22,693	52.86	Republican
8	Dan Skogen	DFL	20,197	47.04	Republican
9	Paul Gazelka	Republican	20,527	53.65	Republican
9	Al Doty	DFL	17,687	46.22	Republican
10	Carrie Ruud	Republican	22,848	53.88	Republican
10	Taylor Stevenson	DFL	19,490	45.96	Republican
11	Tony Lourey	DFL	24,342	64.22	DFL
11	Bill Saumer	Republican	13,505	35.63	DFL
12	Torrey Westrom	Republican	25,279	61.49	Republican
12	John Schultz	DFL	15,801	38.44	Republican
13	Michelle Fischbach	Republican	26,015	63.53	Republican
13	Peggy Boeck	DFL	14,871	36.32	Republican
14	John Pederson	Republican	19,351	52.47	Republican
14	Jerry McCarter	DFL	17,434	47.27	Republican
15	Dave Brown	Republican	21,917	56.55	Republican
15	Sally Knox	DFL	16,787	43.31	Republican
16	Gary Dahms	Republican	20,922	53.01	Republican
16	Ted Suss	DFL	18,496	46.87	Republican
17	Lyle Koenen	DFL	21,621	55.40	DFL
17	Joe Gimse	Republican	17,350	44.46	DFL
18	Scott Newman	Republican	22,556	58.15	Republican
18	Steven Schiroo	DFL	16,180	41.71	Republican
19	Kathy Sheran	DFL	33,291	97.52	DFL
20	Kevin Dahle	DFL	20,627	50.02	DFL
20	Mike Dudley	Republican	20,556	49.85	DFL
21	Matt Schmit	DFL	21,937	52.43	DFL
21	John Howe	Republican	19,846	47.44	DFL
22	Bill Weber	Republican	19,548	52.76	Republican
22	Alan Oberloh	DFL	17,457	47.11	Republican
23	Julie Rosen	Republican	25,838	63.97	Republican
23	Paul Marquardt	DFL	14,516	35.94	Republican
24	Vicki Jensen	DFL	19,248	52.60	DFL
24	Vern Swedin	Republican	17,286	47.23	DFL
25	Dave Senjem	Republican	22,299	53.72	Republican
25	Judy Ohly	DFL	19,149	46.13	Republican
26	Carla Nelson	Republican	22,263	55.62	Republican
26	Kenneth Moen	DFL	17,692	44.20	Republican
27	Dan Sparks	DFL	26,552	68.22	DFL
27	Linden Anderson	Republican	12,334	31.69	DFL
28	Jeremy Miller	Republican	23,122	57.12	Republican
28	Jack Krage	DFL	17,303	42.74	Republican
29	Bruce Anderson	Republican	24,486	60.56	Republican
29	Brian Doran	DFL	15,867	39.25	Republican
30	Mary Kiffmeyer	Republican	25,205	62.41	Republican
30	Paul Perovich	DFL	15,125	37.45	Republican
31	Michelle Benson	Republican	24,774	58.64	Republican
31	Mike Starr	DFL	17,423	41.24	Republican
32	Sean Nienow	Republican	21,955	54.25	Republican
32	Jeske Noordergraaf	DFL	18,450	45.59	Republican
33	David Osmek	Republican	28,195	58.92	Republican
33	Judy Rogosheske	DFL	19,547	40.85	Republican
34	Warren Limmer	Republican	25,847	57.04	Republican
34	Sharon Bahensky	DFL	19,406	42.83	Republican
35	Branden Petersen	Republican	22,874	54.21	Republican
35	Peter Perovich	DFL	19,253	45.63	Republican
36	John Hoffman	DFL	22,194	53.10	DFL
36	Benjamin Kruse	Republican	19,522	46.71	DFL
37	Alice Johnson	DFL	22,814	53.23	DFL
37	Pam Wolf	Republican	19,962	46.57	DFL
38	Roger Chamberlain	Republican	23,817	53.22	Republican
38	Timothy Henderson	DFL	20,849	46.59	Republican
39	Karin Housley	Republican	23,385	50.62	Republican
39	Julie Bunn	DFL	22,754	49.25	Republican
40	Chris Eaton	DFL	25,165	96.93	DFL
41	Barb Goodwin	DFL	25,842	62.82	DFL
41	Gina Bauman	Republican	15,200	36.95	DFL
42	Bev Scalze	DFL	25,607	55.57	DFL
42	April King	Republican	20,400	44.27	DFL
43	Chuck Wiger	DFL	26,767	62.25	DFL
43	Duane Johnson	Republican	16,137	37.53	DFL
44	Terri Bonoff	DFL	27,203	55.81	DFL
44	David Gaither	Republican	21,464	44.04	DFL
45	Ann Rest	DFL	28,608	65.45	DFL
45	Blair Tremere	Republican	15,036	34.40	DFL
46	Ron Latz	DFL	29,755	66.82	DFL
46	Paul Scofield	Republican	14,680	32.97	DFL
47	Julianne Ortman	Republican	27,128	63.76	Republican
47	James Weygand	DFL	15,297	35.96	Republican
48	David Hann	Republican	23,730	51.32	Republican
48	Laurie McKendry	DFL	22,459	48.58	Republican
49	Melisa Franzen	DFL	26,893	52.74	DFL
49	Keith Downey	Republican	24,045	47.15	DFL
50	Melissa Halvorson Wiklund	DFL	25,300	60.85	DFL
50	Vern Wilcox	Republican	16,193	38.95	DFL
51	Jim Carlson	DFL	23,969	53.09	DFL
51	Ted Daley	Republican	21,096	46.73	DFL
52	James Metzen	DFL	27,149	62.00	DFL
52	Dwight Rabuse	Republican	16,542	37.78	DFL
53	Susan Kent	DFL	22,781	52.13	DFL
53	Ted Lillie	Republican	20,857	47.73	DFL
54	Katie Sieben	DFL	26,998	63.80	DFL
54	Janis Quinlan	Republican	15,256	36.05	DFL
55	Eric Pratt	Republican	22,254	55.11	Republican
55	Kathy Busch	DFL	18,070	44.75	Republican
56	Dan Hall	Republican	22,226	53.92	Republican
56	Leon Thurman	DFL	18,922	45.90	Republican
57	Greg Clausen	DFL	23,890	54.09	DFL
57	Pat Hall	Republican	20,199	45.73	DFL
58	Dave Thompson	Republican	24,097	57.60	Republican
58	Andrew Brobston	DFL	17,686	42.28	Republican
59	Bobby Joe Champion	DFL	28,441	82.02	DFL
59	Jim Lilly	Republican	6,082	17.54	DFL
60	Kari Dziedzic	DFL	29,014	77.06	DFL
60	Mark Lazarchic	Republican	6,400	17.00	DFL
60	Rahn Workcuff	Independence	2,077	5.52	DFL
61	Scott Dibble	DFL	41,075	98.08	DFL
62	Jeff Hayden	DFL	27,516	86.84	DFL
62	Eric Blair	Independence	4,025	12.70	DFL
63	Patricia Torres Ray	DFL	36,866	80.81	DFL
63	Patrick Marron	Republican	8,636	18.93	DFL
64	Dick Cohen	DFL	33,008	69.67	DFL
64	Sharon Anderson	Republican	9,069	19.14	DFL
64	Scott Larson	Independent	5,196	10.97	DFL
65	Sandy Pappas	DFL	27,365	81.72	DFL
65	Rick Karschnia	Republican	5,998	17.91	DFL
66	John Marty	DFL	27,735	73.82	DFL
66	Wayde Brooks	Republican	9,718	25.87	DFL
67	Foung Hawj	DFL	21,630	72.46	DFL
67	Mike Capistrant	Republican	8,094	27.11	DFL

== See also ==
- Minnesota House of Representatives election, 2012
- Minnesota gubernatorial election, 2010
- Minnesota elections, 2012
