= Michelle Fischbach =

American politician (born 1965)

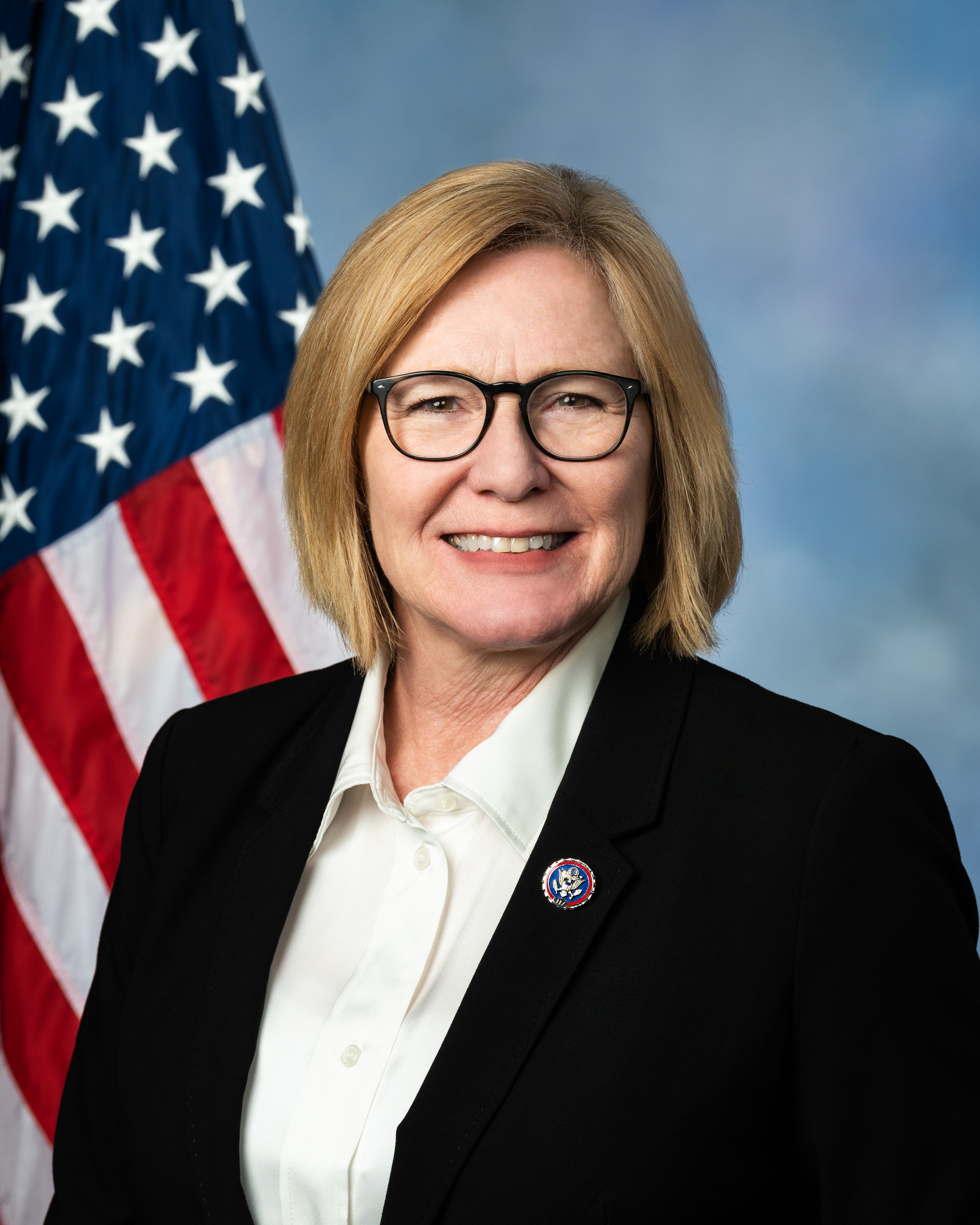
- Official portrait, 2022

Member of the U.S. House of Representatives from Minnesota's 7th district
- Incumbent
- Assumed office January 3, 2021
- Preceded by: Collin Peterson

49th Lieutenant Governor of Minnesota
- In office January 3, 2018 (Note: Took oath of office on May 25, 2018) – January 7, 2019
- Governor: Mark Dayton
- Preceded by: Tina Smith
- Succeeded by: Peggy Flanagan

President of the Minnesota Senate
- In office January 3, 2017 – May 25, 2018
- Preceded by: Sandy Pappas
- Succeeded by: Warren Limmer (acting)
- In office January 4, 2011 – January 7, 2013
- Preceded by: Jim Metzen
- Succeeded by: Sandy Pappas

Member of the Minnesota Senate from the 13th district
- In office January 7, 2013 – May 25, 2018
- Preceded by: Joseph Gimse
- Succeeded by: Jeff Howe

Member of the Minnesota Senate from the 14th district
- In office February 12, 1996 – January 7, 2013
- Preceded by: Joe Bertram
- Succeeded by: John C. Pederson

Personal details
- Born: Michelle Louise Helene St. Martin; November 3, 1965 (age 61) Woodbury, Minnesota, U.S.
- Party: Republican
- Spouse: Scott Fischbach
- Children: 2
- Education: College of Saint Benedict (attended); St. Cloud State University (BA); William Mitchell College of Law (JD)
- Website: House website Campaign website
- Fischbach's voice Fischbach on fallen Minnesotan Guardsmen. Recorded December 12, 2022

Michelle Louise Helene Fischbach (/ˈfɪʃbɑːk/ FISH-bahk; née St. Martin; born November 3, 1965) is an American politician and attorney serving since 2021 as the U.S. representative from Minnesota's 7th congressional district. The district, which is heavily rural, is Minnesota's largest by area and includes most of the western part of the state. A Republican, Fischbach served from 2018 to 2019 as the 49th lieutenant governor of Minnesota. As of 2026, she is the last Republican to have held statewide office in Minnesota. (Note: Tim Pawlenty is the last Republican to have been elected to statewide office in the state, winning in 2006.)

Fischbach was a member of the Minnesota Senate from 1996 to 2018, serving as president of that body from 2011 to 2013 and from 2017 to 2018. When Governor Mark Dayton appointed Tina Smith to the U.S. Senate following Al Franken’s resignation, Fischbach was elevated to the office of lieutenant governor, as required by the Minnesota Constitution.

While serving as the incumbent lieutenant governor of Minnesota, Fischbach was former Governor Tim Pawlenty's nominee for lieutenant governor in the Minnesota Republican Party primary during the 2018 Minnesota gubernatorial election. Pawlenty and Fischbach lost the primary election to Jeff Johnson.

In the 2020 U.S. House elections, Fischbach defeated 30-year DFL incumbent Collin Peterson.

== Early life, education and career ==
Fischbach grew up in Woodbury, Minnesota. After graduating from Woodbury High School, she attended the College of St. Benedict in St. Joseph from 1984 to 1986; she later transferred to St. Cloud State University, where she graduated with a Bachelor of Arts degree in political science and economics in 1989. Fischbach earned her Juris Doctor from William Mitchell School of Law in Saint Paul in 2011.

She first got involved in politics as an intern to Rudy Boschwitz, then a U.S. senator for Minnesota.

In 1994, Fischbach became the first woman elected to the Paynesville City Council, where she served until she was elected to the Minnesota Senate in 1996.

== Minnesota Senate ==
Fischbach was elected to the Minnesota Senate in 1996 in a special election held after the resignation of DFL Senator Joe Bertram, who had recently pleaded guilty to shoplifting. Fischbach was reelected months later in the 1996 general election, and in 2000, 2002, 2006, 2010, 2012, and 2016. She served as an assistant minority leader from 2001 to 2002 and from 2007 to 2008, and as a deputy minority leader from 2009 to 2010. Fischbach also served as the chair of the Senate's higher education committee.

In 2011, after an election in which Senate Republicans won a majority for the first time since party designation, Fischbach's colleagues elected her the first female president of the Minnesota Senate, a post she held until Republicans lost their majority in 2013. After Republicans regained a majority following the 2016 election, Fischbach was again elected Senate president on January 3, 2017.

== Lieutenant governor of Minnesota ==
=== Succession ===
On December 13, 2017, Governor Mark Dayton appointed his lieutenant governor, Tina Smith, to the U.S. Senate seat vacated by Al Franken, who resigned over allegations of sexual misconduct. Smith resigned to accept the appointment on January 2, 2018. Per Article V of the Minnesota Constitution, as president of the State Senate, Fischbach automatically ascended as lieutenant governor. (Note: The Minnesota Constitution provides "The last elected presiding officer of the senate shall become lieutenant governor in case a vacancy occurs in that office.")

=== Constitutional dispute ===
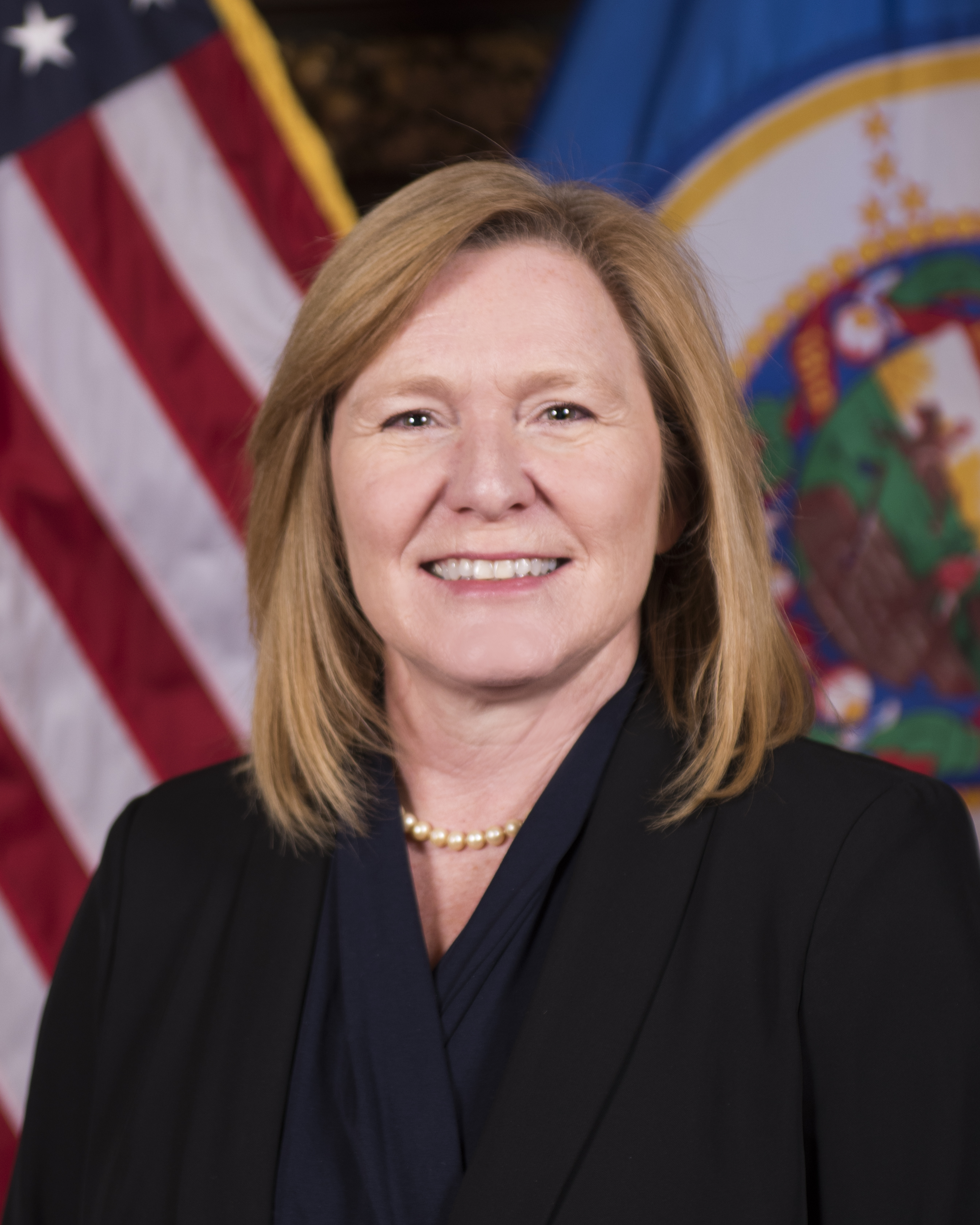
Official portrait of Lt. Gov. Fischbach in 2018

Fischbach acknowledged that she had become lieutenant governor, but maintained she would retain her senate seat, calling herself "acting lieutenant governor". The constitutionality of holding two offices at once was disputed. Fischbach noted a memo from the senate's nonpartisan counsel, which cited an 1898 Minnesota Supreme Court decision as legal precedent for her to hold both offices. She also said the lieutenant governor's duties are largely ceremonial and she would have no difficulty holding both offices. She declined the lieutenant governor's salary, opting to receive only the pay of a state senator. An advisory opinion from state attorney general Lori Swanson disputed the legality of Fischbach's holding both offices at once, citing a constitutional amendment passed in 1972 and other historical precedents. (Note: The Minnesota Constitution specifies "No senator or representative shall hold any other office under the authority of the United States or the state of Minnesota, except that of postmaster or of notary public.")

The potential outcomes were seen as having potentially significant ramifications for Minnesota politics, as Republicans held only a one-vote majority in the state senate. In December 2017, to avoid a potential tie should Fischbach resign her senate seat, Senate Majority Leader Paul Gazelka and House Speaker Kurt Daudt sent Dayton a letter requesting a special legislative session to temporarily elect a Democratic president of the Senate. Dayton and legislative Democrats immediately rejected the idea, with Senate Minority Leader Tom Bakk indicating he would sue to attempt to force Fischbach out of the Senate should she attempt to serve in both offices, saying the senate's "balance of power [...] will be up for grabs".

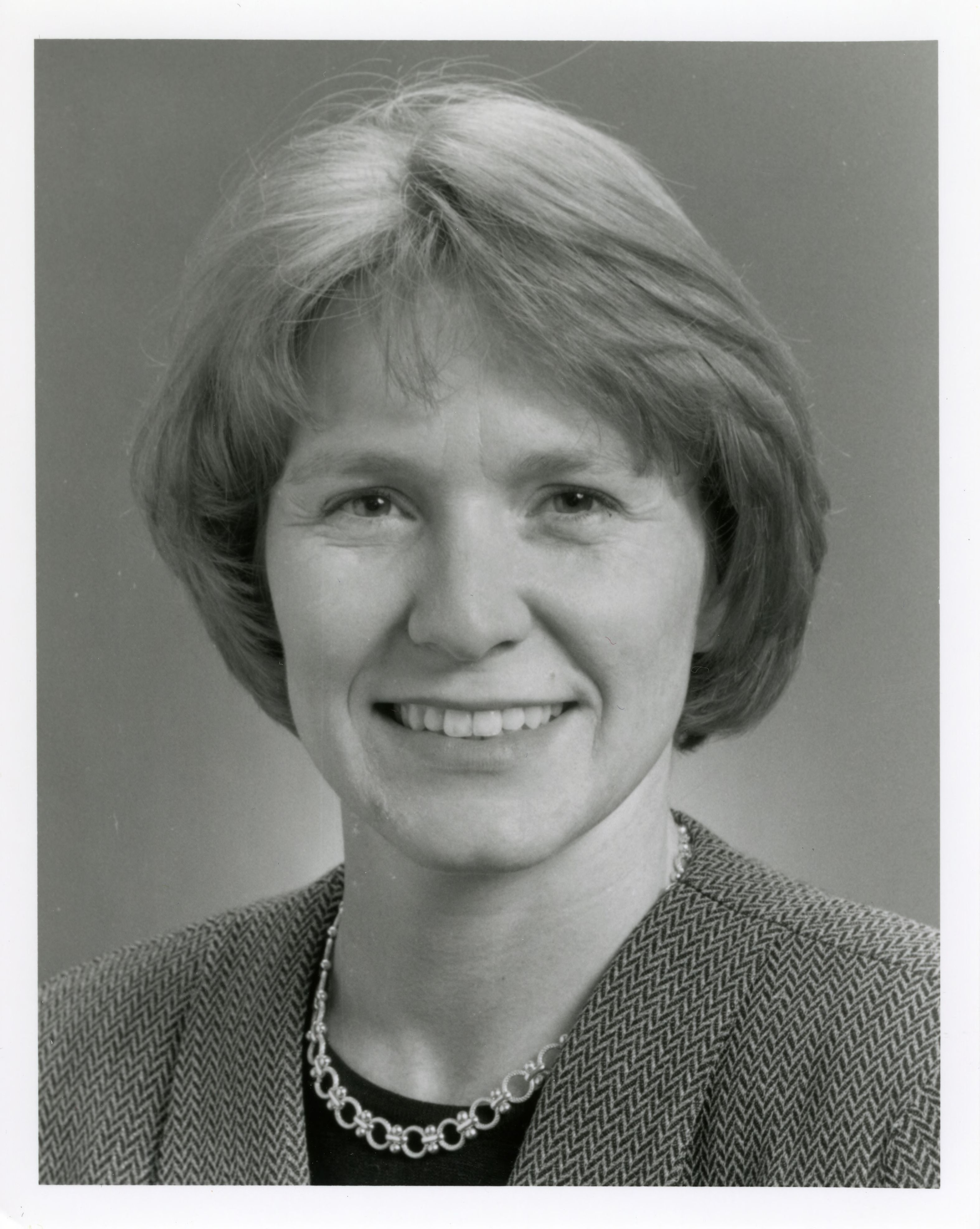
Senator Michelle L. Fischbach, Minnesota Legislature, 1997-1998 Legislative Session.

In January 2018, a constituent and local DFL activist sued Fischbach, asking a Ramsey County District Court judge to remove her from the state senate. In February 2018, a judge dismissed the suit, ruling it had been prematurely filed.

On May 25, 2018, Fischbach resigned from the senate and was sworn in as lieutenant governor.

=== Campaign ===
In May 2018, former Republican Governor Tim Pawlenty announced Fischbach as his running mate in his bid for a third term. Pawlenty and Fischbach lost the Republican primary to Jeff Johnson and Donna Bergstrom.

Fischbach was succeeded as lieutenant governor by Democratic State Representative Peggy Flanagan, who ran on a ticket with Tim Walz. Fischbach left office on January 7, 2019, after Walz and Flanagan were sworn in.

== U.S. House of Representatives ==
=== Elections ===
==== 2020 ====
On September 3, 2019, Fischbach announced her candidacy for the Republican nomination to challenge 30-year incumbent Democrat Collin Peterson in Minnesota's 7th congressional district. She won the five-way Republican primary election. Despite Peterson's incumbency, the 7th had been trending Republican for some time. The Republican presidential nominee had carried the district by double-digit margins in three of the previous five elections, including 2016, when Donald Trump carried it with 62% of the vote, his best showing in Minnesota and one of his best showings in any district held by a Democrat.

During her campaign, Fischbach pledged to back Trump on trade, make the 2017 tax cuts permanent, and support workforce education and additional relief for rural and agricultural businesses affected by COVID-19. Her campaign emphasized her support for farmers and the Second Amendment, opposition to abortion, and support for strengthening the U.S. border.

Fischbach defeated Peterson by 49,226 votes, the largest margin of any Republican who defeated an incumbent Democrat in 2020. In the same election, Trump carried the 7th district with 64% of the vote, his best showing in the state. Fischbach and Mariannette Miller-Meeks are the only Republican members of Congress to flip Democratic House districts that were not held by Republicans before 2018.

=== Tenure ===
On January 7, 2021, Fischbach was one of 139 representatives to object to the certification of electoral votes from Arizona and Pennsylvania in the 2020 U.S. presidential election, citing allegations of irregularities and voter fraud. On January 13, 2021, she voted against the second impeachment of Trump.

=== Committee assignments ===
For the 118th Congress:

- Committee on Ethics
- Committee on Rules
  - Subcommittee on Legislative and Budget Process (chair)
- Committee on the Budget
- Committee on Ways and Means
  - Subcommittee on Oversight
  - Subcommittee on Trade

For the 119th Congress: Committee on Rules • Subcommittee on Rules and Organization of the House (chair) Committee on Ways and Means • Subcommittee on Oversight • Subcommittee on Trade

=== Caucus membership ===
- Congressional Pro-Life Caucus (Co-chair)
- Congressional Western Caucus (Vice Chair)
- Northern Border Caucus
- Congressional Biofuels Caucus
- Republican Study Committee

== Political positions ==
=== Abortion ===
Fischbach has historically opposed abortion and has repeatedly introduced legislation to limit access to abortion.

=== Firearms ===
Fischbach has been a staunch proponent of the Second Amendment to the U.S. Constitution and gun rights.

=== Israel ===
Fischbach voted to provide Israel with support following the 2023 Hamas attack on Israel.

=== Vote to defund vice president ===
On November 8, 2023, Fischbach joined 100 other Republicans voting in favor of an amendment to a large appropriations bill that would prohibit funding for the Office of Vice President Kamala Harris.

== Personal life ==
Fischbach is Roman Catholic. She met her husband, Scott, while working on a campaign for former U.S. Senator Rudy Boschwitz. They started dating while she was attending St. Cloud State University and eventually moved to nearby Paynesville. When Fischbach ran for Congress she still lived in Paynesville, in the far southern corner of the congressional district. She and her family have since moved to Regal, near Willmar. They have two children and several grandchildren.

Scott Fischbach has served as executive director of Minnesota Citizens Concerned for Life since 2001.

== Electoral history ==
=== 2020 ===
Republican primary results
Party	Candidate	Votes	%
Republican	Michelle Fischbach	26,359	58.8
Republican	Dave Hughes	9,948	22.2
Republican	Noel Collis	6,747	15.1
Republican	William Louwagie	989	2.2
Republican	Jayesun Sherman	757	1.7
Total votes		44,800	100.0

Minnesota's 7th congressional district, 2020
Party	Candidate	Votes	%
Republican	Michelle Fischbach	188,994	53.8
Democratic (DFL)	Collin Peterson (incumbent)	139,071	39.6
Total votes		351,227	100.0
Republican gain from Democratic (DFL)			

=== 2022 ===
Minnesota's 7th congressional district, 2022
Party	Candidate	Votes	%
Republican	Michelle Fischbach (incumbent)	204,766	66.9
Democratic (DFL)	Jill Abahsain	84,455	27.6
Legal Marijuana Now	Travis Johnson	16,421	5.4
Write-in		224	0.1
Total votes		305,866	100.0
Republican hold			

=== 2024 ===
Minnesota's 7th congressional district, 2024
Party	Candidate	Votes	%
Republican	Michelle Fischbach (incumbent)	275,098	70.5
Democratic (DFL)	John Peters	114,979	29.4
Write-in		433	0.1
Total votes		390,510	100.0
Republican hold			

== See also ==
- List of female lieutenant governors in the United States
- Women in the United States House of Representatives

== Notes ==
Political offices
Preceded by Jim Metzen	President of the Minnesota Senate; 2011–2013	Succeeded by Sandy Pappas
Preceded by Sandy Pappas	President of the Minnesota Senate; 2017–2018	Succeeded by Warren Limmer; Acting
Preceded by Tina Smith	Lieutenant Governor of Minnesota; 2018–2019	Succeeded by Peggy Flanagan
U.S. House of Representatives
Preceded by Collin Peterson	Member of the U.S. House of Representatives from Minnesota's 7th congressional district 2021–present	Incumbent
U.S. order of precedence (ceremonial)
Preceded by Randy Feenstra	United States representatives by seniority 249th	Succeeded by Scott L. Fitzgerald
