= Matt Schmit =

American politician

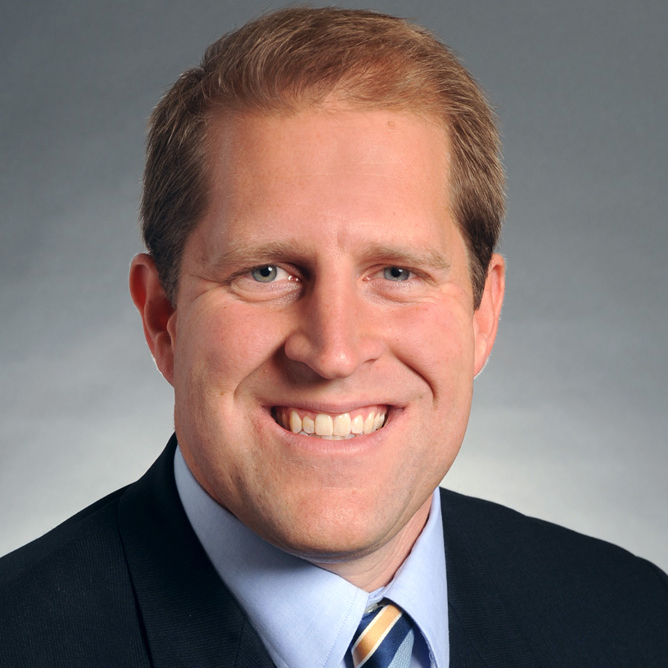

Member of the Minnesota Senate from the 21st district
- In office January 8, 2013 – January 2, 2017
- Preceded by: John Howe (District 28)
- Succeeded by: Mike Goggin

Personal details
- Born: 1979 (age 46–47) Red Wing, Minnesota, U.S.
- Party: Democratic (DFL)
- Education: Saint John's University (BA); University of Minnesota (MPP)
- Occupation: consultant

Matt Schmit (born 1979) is an American state politician and former member of the Minnesota Senate. A member of the Minnesota Democratic–Farmer–Labor Party (DFL), he represented District 21 in southeastern Minnesota.

== Early life, education, and career ==
Schmit was born and raised in Red Wing, Minnesota. He graduated from Red Wing High School. He attended Saint John's University, graduating with a B.A. in biology and political science. He later attended the Hubert H. Humphrey School of Public Affairs at the University of Minnesota, graduating with a M.P.P. He is a public policy consultant.

== Minnesota Senate ==
Schmit was first elected to the Minnesota Senate in 2012. He lost re-election to Republican Mike Goggin in 2016. While a member of the Senate, Schmit resided in Red Wing, Minnesota.

== Illinois Office of Broadband ==
In 2019, Schmit was appointed the head of the Illinois Department of Commerce and Economic Opportunity's Office of Broadband. Schmit will manage the “Connect Illinois” program and work with the state's Broadband Advisory Council.
