= Mike Goggin =

American politician from Minnesota

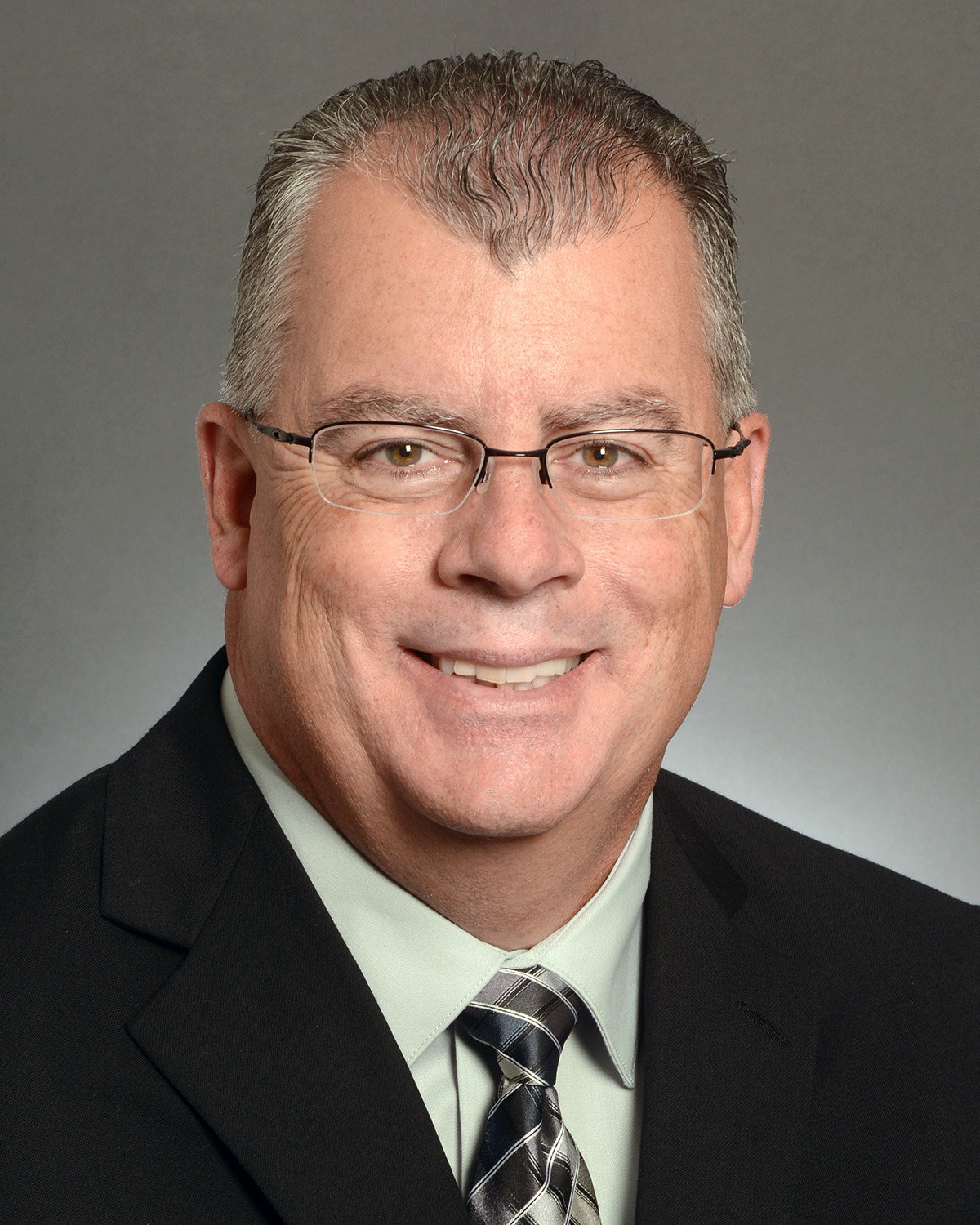

Member of the Minnesota Senate from the 21st district
- In office January 3, 2017 – January 3, 2023
- Preceded by: Matt Schmit
- Succeeded by: Bill Weber

Personal details
- Born: March 8, 1963 (age 63)
- Party: Republican
- Spouse: Pam
- Children: 2
- Education: Gustavus Adolphus College; University of Colorado Denver
- Occupation: project manager

Michael P. Goggin (born March 8, 1963) is an American politician and former member of the Minnesota Senate. A member of the Republican Party of Minnesota, he represented District 21 in southeastern Minnesota.

== Early life, education, and career ==
Goggin graduated from Red Wing High School. He attended Gustavus Adolphus College, graduating with a Bachelor of Arts with a major in business administration, and the University of Colorado Denver, graduating with a Bachelor of Science with a major in electrical engineering.

Goggin previously worked for Red Wing Shoes, of which his father, Joe Goggin, was previously its president. He is a project manager at the Prairie Island Nuclear Power Plant.

== Minnesota Senate ==
Goggin was elected to the Minnesota Senate in 2016.

== Personal life ==
Goggin and his wife, Pam, have two children and reside in Red Wing.
