= Steve Cwodzinski =

American politician

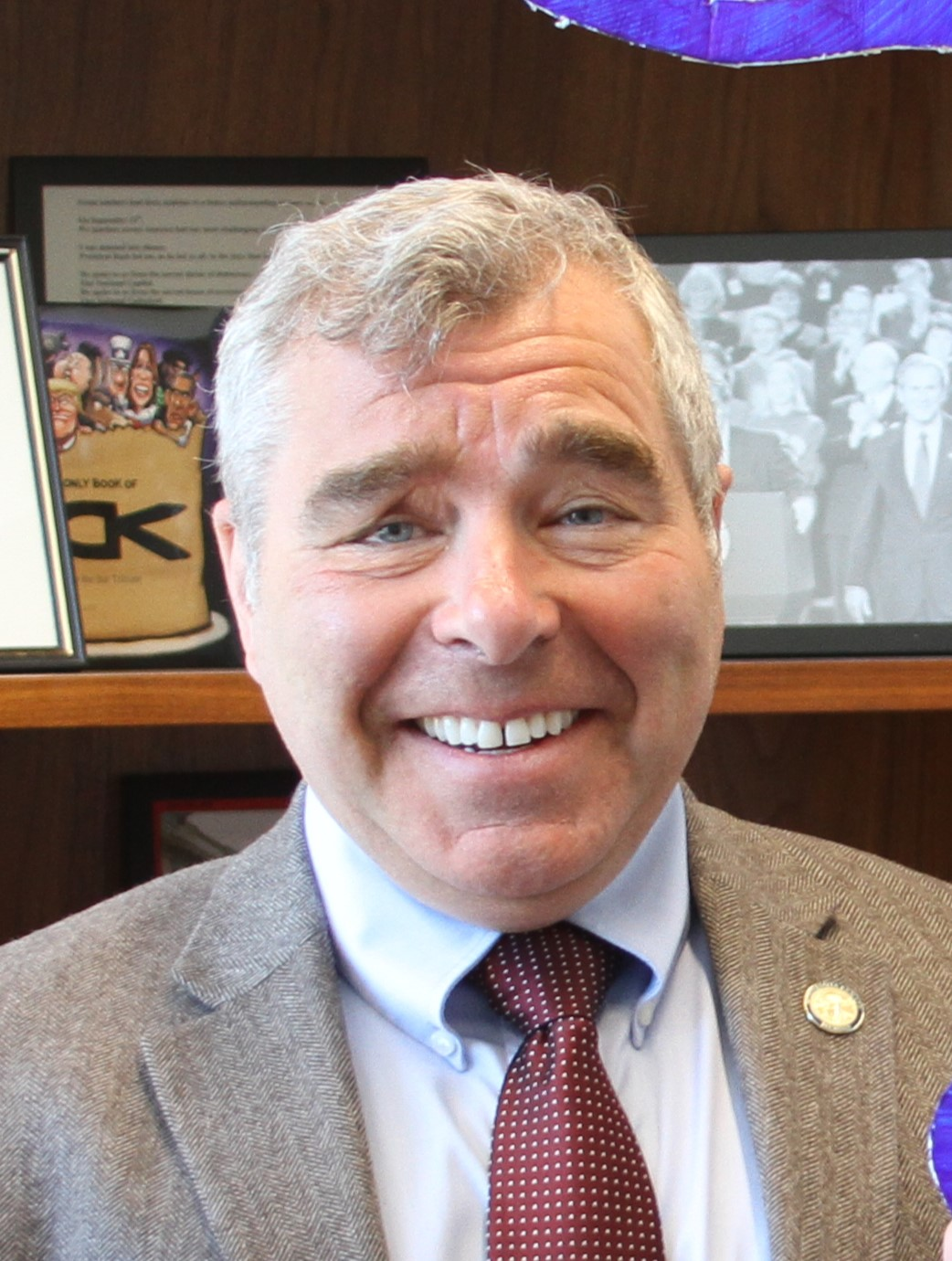
- Cwodzinski in 2019

Member of the Minnesota Senate from the 49th district
- Incumbent
- Assumed office January 3, 2017
- Preceded by: David Hann

Personal details
- Born: September 8, 1958 (age 67) Superior, Wisconsin
- Party: Democratic (DFL)
- Spouse: Patti
- Children: 2
- Education: University of Minnesota

Steve A. Cwodzinski (/swɒdˈzɪnski/ swod-ZIN-skee; born September 8, 1958) is an American politician and member of the Minnesota Senate. A member of the Minnesota Democratic–Farmer–Labor Party (DFL), he represents District 49, including Eden Prairie and Minnetonka, in the western Twin Cities metropolitan area.

== Early life, education, and career ==
Cwodzinski was born and raised in Superior, Wisconsin. He attended the University of Minnesota, graduating with a bachelor's degree in education and, later, a master's degree in education.

Cwodzinski spent more than 30 years teaching government and history classes at Eden Prairie High School. He was recognized with the Presidential Scholar's Influential Teacher Award for his work in the classroom. He published a book, Beyond the Lesson Plan, about the lessons he learned during his years in the classroom.

== Minnesota Senate ==
Cwodzinski was elected to the Minnesota Senate in 2016, defeating incumbent David Hann, the Republican minority leader, in an extremely close race. He served Minnesota Senate District 48 until redistricting in 2022.

Cwodzinski was reelected in 2022 in District 49 with 62.3% of the vote, defeating Marla Helseth.

Cwodzinski chairs the Minnesota Senate Education Policy Committee. He is also serving on the following committees during the 2023-24 93rd legislature:

- Education Finance
- Elections
- State and Local Government and Veterans

== Personal life ==
Cwodzinski and his wife, Patti, have two children and two grandchildren and live in Eden Prairie. A self-proclaimed outdoors enthusiast, Cwodzinski has traveled to the Boundary Waters Canoe Area Wilderness almost every summer since 1979.
