= John Jasinski (politician) =

American politician

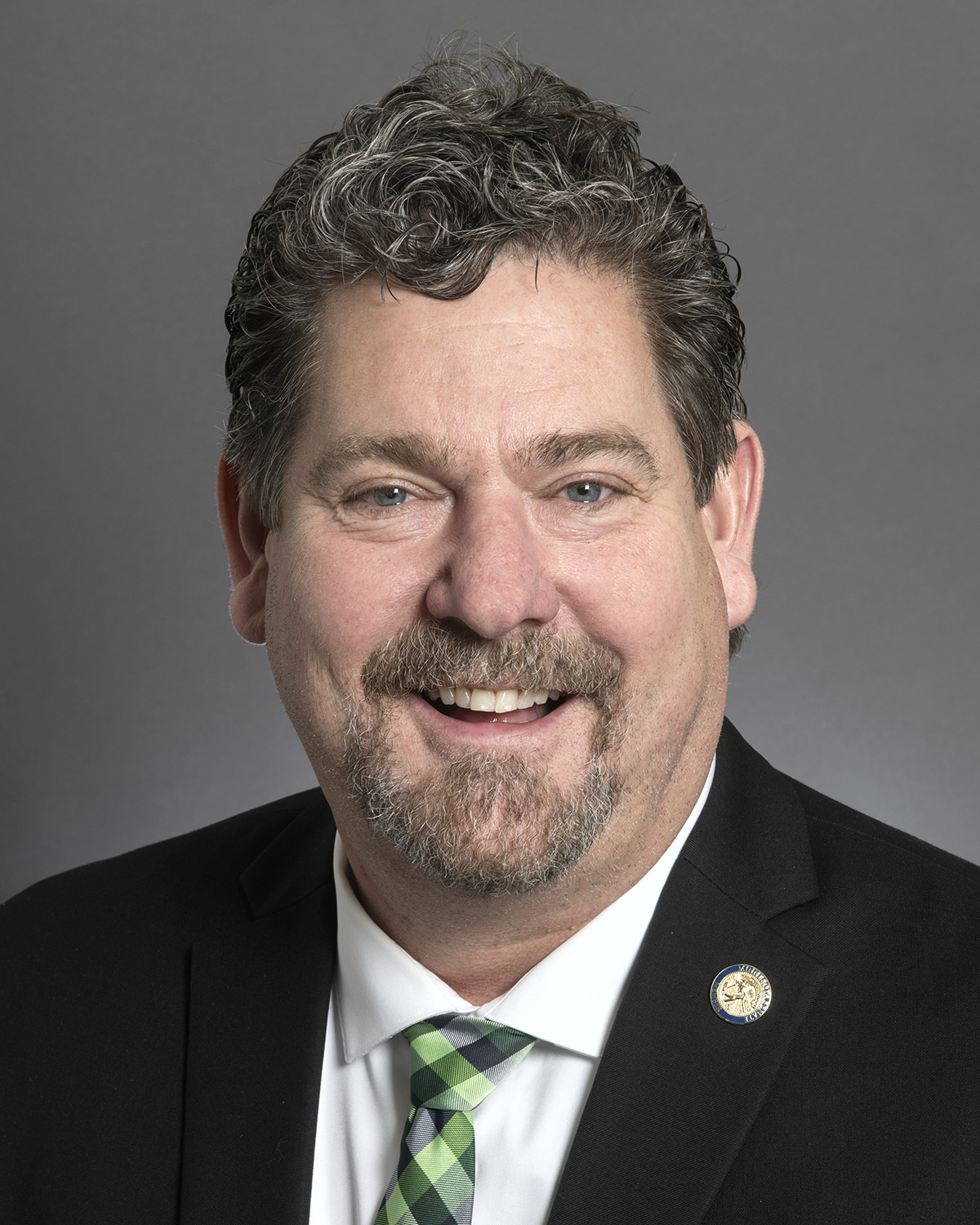

Member of the Minnesota Senate
- Incumbent
- Assumed office January 3, 2017
- Preceded by: Vicki Jensen
- Constituency: 24th district (2017-2023); 19th district (2023-present)

Mayor of Faribault
- In office 2008–2016
- Succeeded by: Kevin Voracek

Member of Faribault City Council
- In office 1996 - 1998

Personal details
- Born: June 24, 1966 (age 60)
- Party: Republican Party of Minnesota
- Children: 2
- Education: University of Minnesota Duluth; Minnesota State University, Mankato
- Occupation: real estate broker

John R. Jasinski (/dʒəˈsɪnski/ jə-SIN-skee; born June 24, 1966) is an American politician and member of the Minnesota Senate. A member of the Republican Party of Minnesota, he represents Minnesota's 19th Senate District in southeastern Minnesota.

== Early life, education, and career ==
Jasinski was born on June 24, 1966, and raised in Faribault. He graduated from Faribault High School and attended the University of Minnesota Duluth and Minnesota State University, Mankato.

Jasinski was in the Navy for four years. He was previously a member of the Faribault Planning Commission, the Faribault Economic Development Authority, and, from 1996 to 1998, the Faribault City Council. Jasinski was the mayor of Faribault from 2008 to 2016 and is a real estate broker at MDC Real Estate Services in Faribault.

== Minnesota Senate ==
Jasinski was elected to the Minnesota Senate in 2016.

== Personal life ==
Jasinski is divorced and has two children. He resides in Faribault.

In October 2020, Jasinski was arrested for driving while impaired; he subsequently pleaded guilty to misdemeanor careless driving and was given a year of probation with mandatory treatment for chemical dependency.
