= Vicki Jensen =

American politician

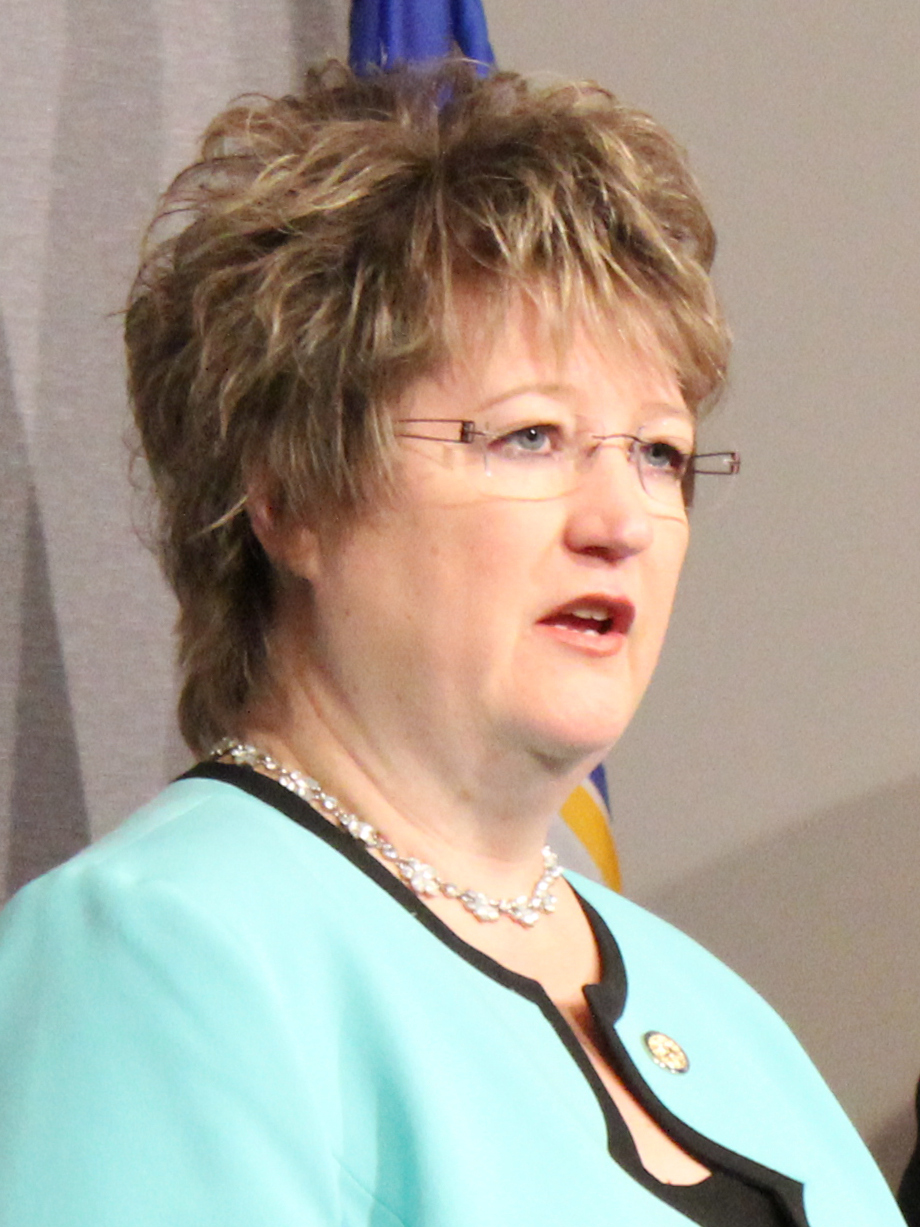

Member of the Minnesota Senate from the 24th district
- In office January 8, 2013 – January 2, 2017
- Preceded by: Mike Parry (District 26)
- Succeeded by: John Jasinski

Personal details
- Born: 1965 (age 60–61)
- Party: Minnesota Democratic–Farmer–Labor Party
- Spouse: Trevor
- Children: 3
- Education: South Central Technical College
- Occupation: Insurance broker

Vicki Jensen (born 1965) is a Minnesota politician and former member of the Minnesota Senate. A member of the Minnesota Democratic–Farmer–Labor Party, she represented District 24 in southeastern Minnesota.

== Education and early career ==
Jensen attended South Central Technical College. She served on the Owatonna School Board. She and her husband own an independent insurance agency in Owatonna.

== Minnesota Senate ==
Jensen was first elected to the Minnesota Senate in 2012. She lost re-election to Republican John Jasinski in 2016.

Jensen sought the Democratic nomination for the U.S. House seat in Minnesota's 1st congressional district in the 2018 election, but later dropped out of the race.

== Personal life ==
Jensen is married to Trevor. They have three children and reside in Owatonna, Minnesota.
