= Joseph Gimse =

American politician

Member of the Minnesota Senate from the 13th district
- In office 2007 – January 7, 2013
- Preceded by: Dean Johnson
- Succeeded by: Michelle Fischbach

Personal details
- Born: July 31, 1957 (age 69) Richmond, Minnesota, U.S.
- Party: Republican Party of Minnesota
- Spouse: Lanae
- Children: Four
- Education: Ridgewater College
- Occupation: Land developer, home builder, legislator, veteran

Joseph R. "Joe" Gimse (born July 31, 1957) is a Minnesota politician and a former member of the Minnesota Senate who represented District 13, which included portions of Kandiyohi, Pope and Stearns counties in the west central part of the state. A Republican, he was first elected to the Senate in 2006, and was reelected in 2010. He also ran unsuccessfully for the seat in 2002 against former Senator Dean Johnson. He served as an assistant minority leader. Gimse ran for reelection in 2012 in the newly drawn 17th District, but was defeated by Clara City DFLer Lyle Koenen.

Gimse was a member of the Senate's Agriculture and Veterans Committee, the Business, Industry and Jobs Committee, the State and Local Government Operations and Oversight Committee, and the Transportation Committee. He also served on the Business, Industry and Jobs Subcommittee for Bioscience and Renewable Energy Development, on the Finance subcommittees for the Agriculture and Veterans Budget and Policy Division and the Transportation Budget and Policy Division, and on the State and Local Government Operations and Oversight Subcommittee for Elections. His special legislative concerns included education, health care, economic development, transportation, and business development.

Gimse is a home builder and land developer by profession. He attended Willmar High School in Willmar, then served as a specialist in the United States Army in Germany from 1975 to 1979. He attended Ridgewater College (formerly Willmar Technical College) in Willmar, earning an A.A.S. in automotive technology in 1981, and a Certificate in supervisory management in 1987.

Gimse is an avid hunter and outdoorsman. He is a member of the National Rifle Association of America, Ducks Unlimited, Pheasants Forever, and the Rocky Mountain Elks Association. He is also a member of the Experimental Aircraft Association, the Fraternal Order of Eagles, and the Knights of Columbus. In Minnesota, he is a member of the Minnesota Deer Hunters Association and the Minnesota Turkey Hunters Association. He has been a member of and active in the Kandiyohi County Republican Party since 1981.
