= Paul Anderson (Minnesota state senator) =

American politician (born 1973)

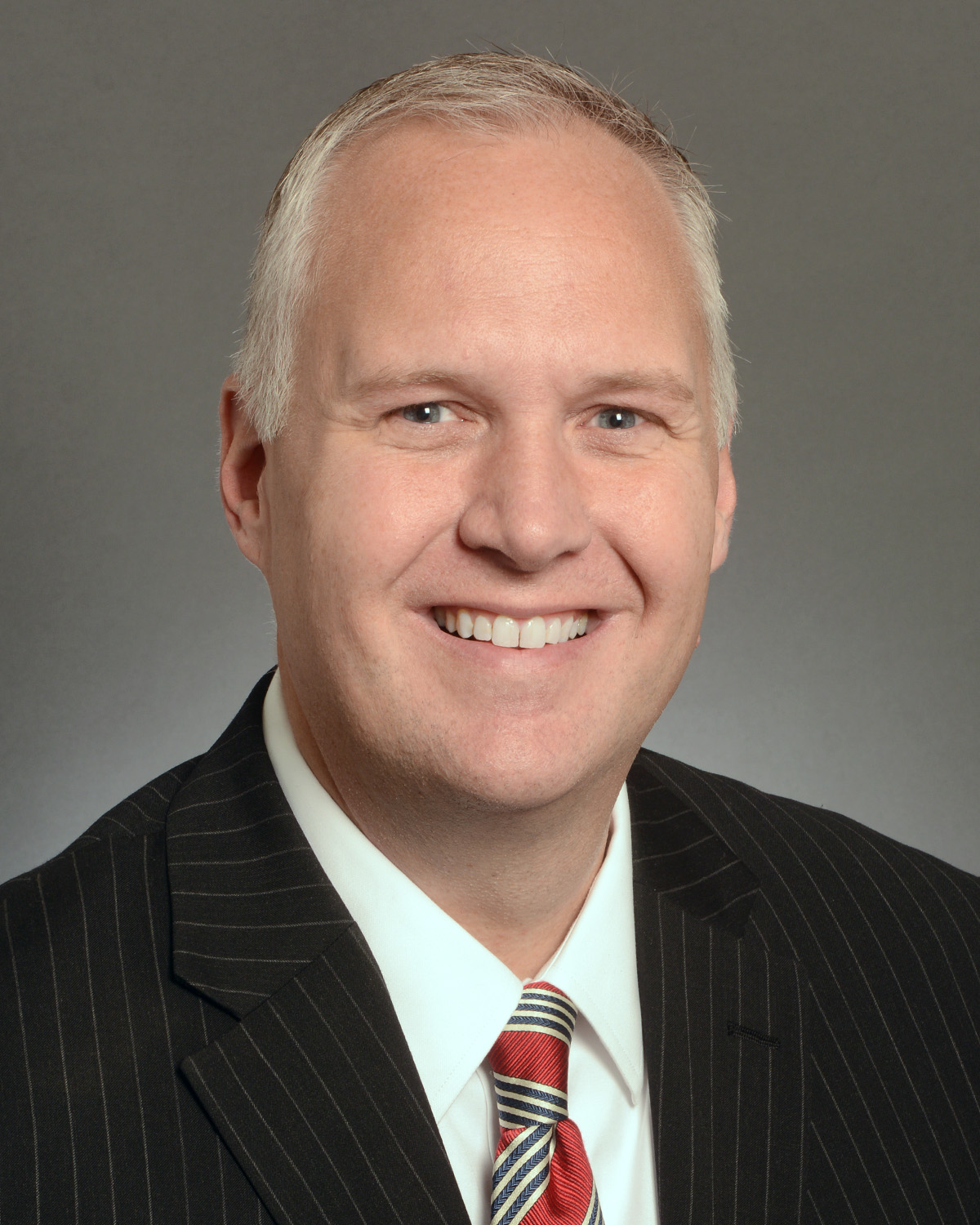
- Anderson in 2016

Member of the Minnesota Senate from the 44th district
- In office January 3, 2017 – January 4, 2021
- Preceded by: Terri Bonoff
- Succeeded by: Ann Johnson Stewart

Personal details
- Born: September 18, 1973 (age 52) Plymouth, Minnesota, U.S.
- Party: Republican
- Spouse: Jamie
- Children: 2
- Education: Concordia College
- Occupation: small business owner

Paul T. Anderson (born September 18, 1973) is an American businessman, politician and former member of the Minnesota Senate. A member of the Republican Party of Minnesota, he represented District 44 in the western Twin Cities metropolitan area.

== Early life, education, and career ==
Anderson was born on September 18, 1973, and raised in Plymouth, Minnesota. He graduated from Wayzata High School and attended Concordia College, graduating with a Bachelor of Arts in business administration, communications, and political science.

Anderson was a district director and campaign manager for former U.S. Representative Jim Ramstad and a deputy chief of staff for former Governor Tim Pawlenty. He was also director of business development of Touchpoint.io, president and CEO of Tee It Up for the Troops, executive vice president of the National Christian Foundation Twin Cities, an owner of O.L.A. Enterprises, and a board member of the Heritage Christian Academy Foundation. He is currently the owner of The Anderson Group, a consulting firm.

== Minnesota Senate ==
Anderson was elected to the Minnesota Senate in 2016. In 2020, he announced that he will not seek another term in the Senate.

== Personal life ==
Anderson and his wife, Jamie, have two children and reside in Plymouth. They are members of the Plymouth Covenant Church.
