= John Pederson (politician) =

American politician (born 1968)

Member of the Minnesota Senate from the 14th district 15th (2011–2013)
- In office January 4, 2011 – January 2, 2017
- Preceded by: Tarryl Clark
- Succeeded by: Jerry Relph

Personal details
- Born: March 23, 1968 (age 58) Wright County, Minnesota
- Party: Republican Party of Minnesota
- Children: 3
- Education: Northwestern College; Cardinal Stritch University
- Occupation: business owner

John C. Pederson (born March 23, 1968) is a Minnesota politician and former member of the Minnesota Senate. A member of the Republican Party of Minnesota, he represented District 14, which includes portions of Benton, Sherburne and Stearns counties in the central part of the state.

== Early life, education, and career ==
Born and raised on a farm in rural Wright County, Pederson graduated from Northwestern College in Roseville, receiving his B.S. in Business Administration and Biblical Studies. He went on to Cardinal Stritch University in Milwaukee, Wisconsin, earning his M.B.A. Active in community government, he served on St. Cloud's city council (2007–2010), zoning board of appeals, and planning commission, and was a commissioner on the St. Cloud Housing and Redevelopment Authority. He was also a volunteer wood shop supervisor at the Whitney Senior Center.

He is vice president and part owner of Amcon Block and Precast Inc. in St. Cloud. He is a former part-time instructor in Human Relations for the Dale Carnegie Institute, a former part-time instructor in Customized Training at St. Cloud Technical College, and a former adjunct instructor in the Business Department at Rasmussen College, based in Minnesota.

== Minnesota Senate ==
Pederson was first elected in 2010 and reelected in 2012. He did not seek reelection in 2016.
