= 1986 Minnesota Senate election =

Minnesota Senate election, 1986
- November 4, 1986

All 67 seats in the Minnesota Senate 34 seats needed for a majority
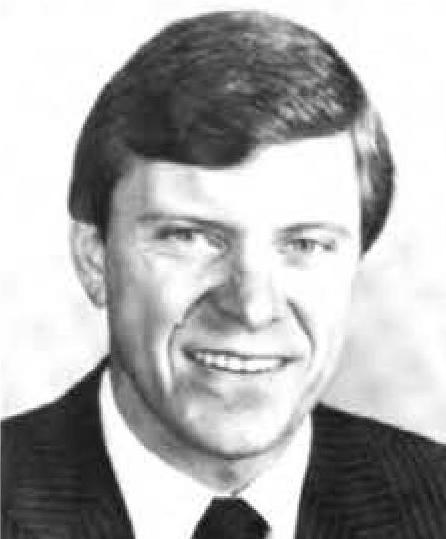

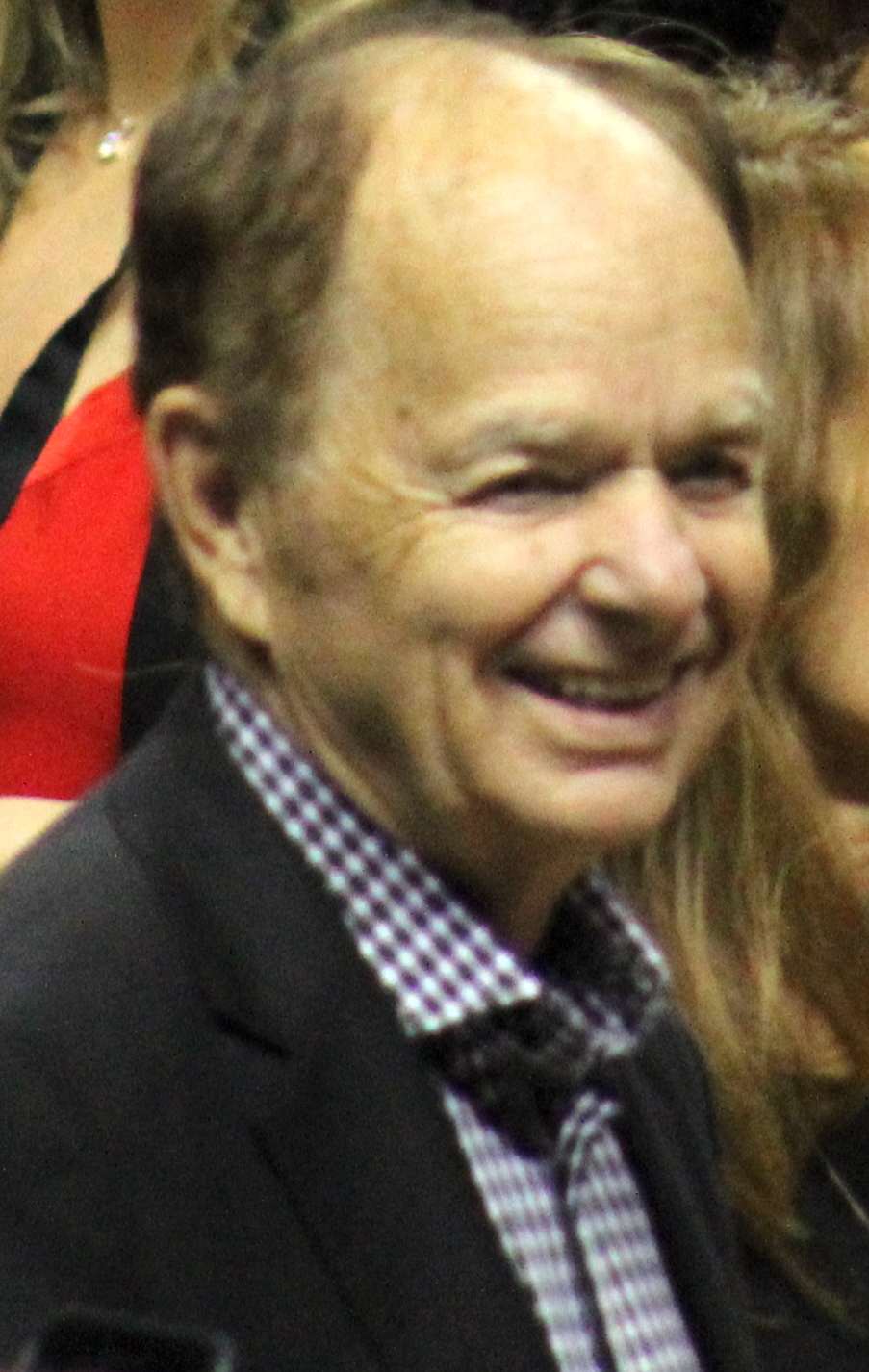
	Majority party	Minority party
Leader	Roger Moe	Glen Taylor
Party	Democratic (DFL)	Ind.-Republican
Leader since	1980	1985
Leader's seat	2nd–Erskine	24th–Mankato
Last election	42 seats	25 seats
Seats before	43	24
Seats won	47	20
Seat change	▲4	▼4
Popular vote	765,584	591,061
Majority Leader before election
Roger Moe
Democratic (DFL)
Elected Majority Leader
Roger Moe
Democratic (DFL)

The 1986 Minnesota Senate election was held in the U.S. state of Minnesota on November 4, 1986, to elect members to the Senate of the 75th and 76th Minnesota Legislatures. A primary election was held on September 9, 1986.

The Minnesota Democratic–Farmer–Labor Party (DFL) won a majority of seats, remaining the majority party, followed by the Independent-Republicans of Minnesota. The new Legislature convened on January 6, 1987.

== Results ==
Summary of the November 4, 1986 Minnesota Senate election results
Party	Candidates	Votes	Seats		
Party	Candidates	Votes	No.	∆No.	%
Minnesota Democratic–Farmer–Labor Party	67	765,584	47	▲4	70.15
Independent-Republicans of Minnesota	62	591,061	20	▼4	29.85
Total			67	±0	100.00
Turnout (out of 3,024,070 eligible voters)	1,456,579	48.17%		▼14.17 pp	
Source: Minnesota Secretary of State, Minnesota Legislative Reference Library

== See also ==
- Minnesota House of Representatives election, 1986
- Minnesota gubernatorial election, 1986
