= Julie Rosen =

American politician

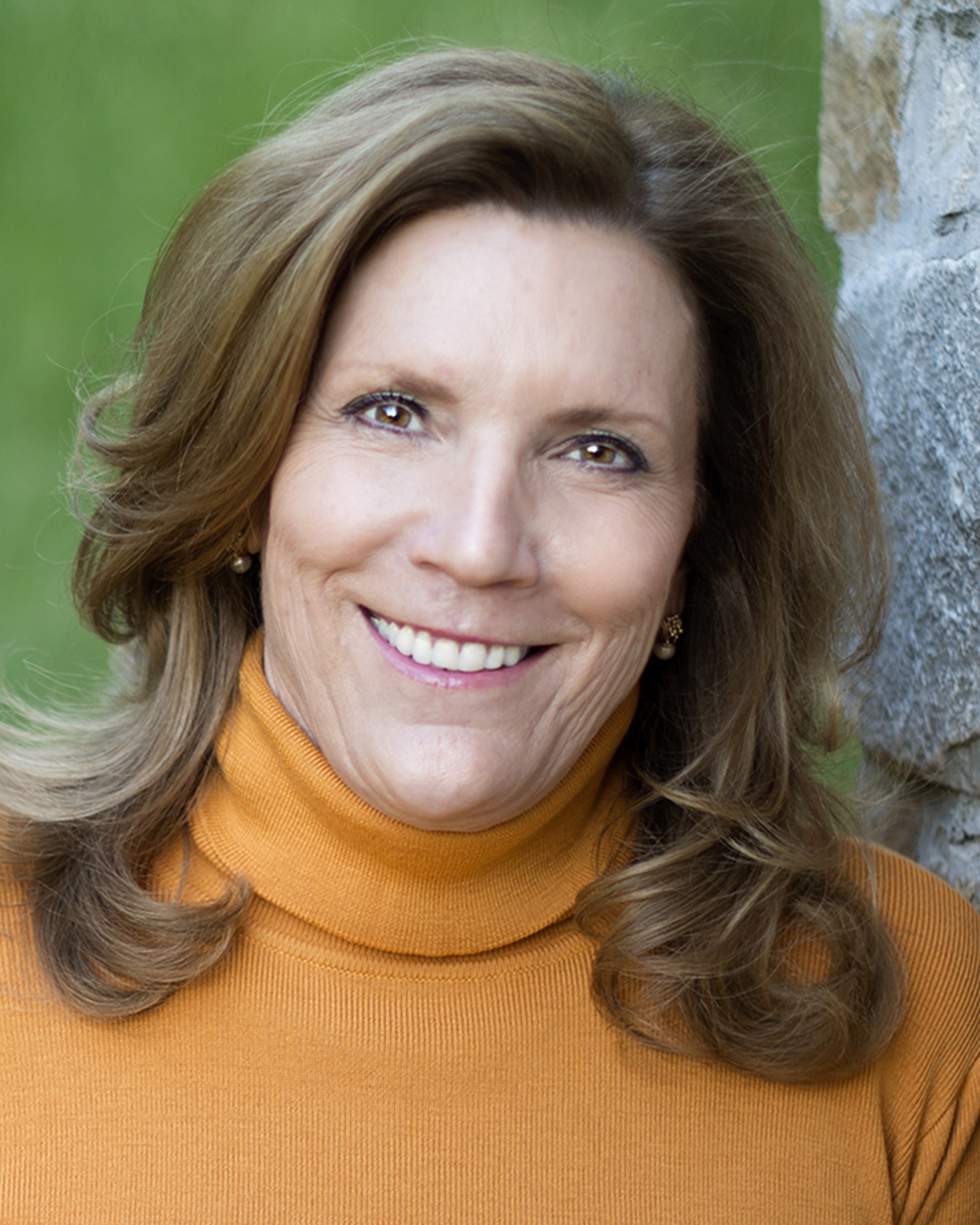

Member of the Minnesota Senate from the 23rd district 24th (2003–2013)
- Incumbent
- Assumed office January 7, 2003
- Preceded by: redrawn district

Personal details
- Born: August 9, 1957 (age 69) Denver, Colorado, U.S.
- Party: Republican
- Spouse: Tom Rosen (d. 2010)
- Children: 3
- Education: Colorado State University (BS)
- Occupation: legislator

Julie A. Rosen (born August 9, 1957) is an American politician serving as a member of the Minnesota Senate. A member of the Republican Party of Minnesota, she represents District 23, which includes all or portions of Blue Earth, Faribault, Jackson, Le Sueur, Martin, Waseca, and Watonwan counties in the southern part of the state.

== Early life, education, and career ==
Originally from Colorado, Rosen graduated from high school in Denver, and later graduated with a Bachelor of Science degree in Agronomy from Colorado State University. She worked as a marketing representative for both Elanco and American Hoechst Chemical Company prior to being elected to the legislature.

== Minnesota Senate ==
Rosen represented District 24 in the Senate from 2003 to 2013. She was redistricted to District 23 in 2012. Her service earned her the "Freshman Legislator of the Year" award.

As a freshman senator, Rosen earned the distinction of being a leading authority on methamphetamine and other drug-related issues. She organized the Minnesota Meth Task Force and, under her direction and leadership, developed and passed the groundbreaking Minnesota Meth Bill in 2005. This law is the most comprehensive meth legislation in the nation. She continues to work passionately towards fighting drug use among children and adults.

Along with her work on drug and public safety issues, former Governor Tim Pawlenty (R) called Rosen a "strong voice for rural Minnesota." She has a background in agriculture. She is also active in seeking improvements in health care, working towards finding a more affordable and beneficial cost and delivery program that supplies the people of Minnesota with better health care benefits. In November 2008, she was appointed by Pawlenty to the Rural Health Advisory Committee. The Rural Health Advisory Committee advises the Minnesota Commissioner of Health and other state agencies on rural health issues. It consists of 15 members appointed by the Governor.

Rosen consistently voted against the legalization of same-sex marriage. In 2006, she voted to force a Minnesota marriage amendment out of committee and onto the floor. In 2011, Rosen voted to place a same-sex marriage ban question on Minnesota's 2012 ballot. She voted against the 2013 bill to legalize same-sex marriage in Minnesota.

In 2008, Rosen voted against a bill (SF 960) that would have allowed local governments to offer whatever health benefits they chose, including domestic partner benefits, to their employees. In 2009, Rosen voted against school anti-bullying legislation (SF 971) that would protect LGBTQ youth. She voted for the Limmer Amendment to SF 971, which specifies that the bill does not imply that Minnesota condones homosexuality or bisexuality, nor that education institutions are permitted to promote homosexuality or bisexuality or require them to be taught as "acceptable lifestyles." In 2009 and 2010, Rosen voted against a bill (SF 341) that would provide death rights to domestic partners.

Following her re-election in 2012, Rosen was mentioned as a potential candidate for Senator or Governor of Minnesota.

On February 17, 2022; Rosen announced she would be retiring at the end of her current term and would not seek re-election in 2022.

== Electoral history ==
- Minnesota Senate 23rd district election, 2020
  - Julie Rosen (R), 32,533 votes (78.66%)
  - David Pulkrabek (LMN), 8,730 votes (21.11%)
  - Write-in, 98 votes (0.24%)
- Minnesota Senate 23rd district election, 2016
  - Julie Rosen (R), 28,063 votes (70.81%)
  - Barbara Ann Lake (DFL), 11,529 votes (29.09%)
  - Write-in, 40 votes (0.10%)
- Minnesota Senate 23rd district election, 2012
  - Julie Rosen (R), 25,838 votes (63.97%)
  - Paul Marquardt (DFL), 14,516 votes (35.94%)
  - Write-in, 36 votes (0.09%)
- Minnesota Senate 24th district election, 2010
  - Julie Rosen (R), 25,300 votes (98.16%)
  - Write-in, 473 votes (1.84%)
- Minnesota Senate 24th district election, 2006
  - Julie Rosen (R), 19,579 votes (62.18%)
  - David Wertjes (DFL), 11,880 votes (37.73%)
  - Write-in, 27 votes (0.09%)
- Minnesota Senate 24th district election, 2002
  - Julie Rosen (R), 15,719 votes (47.37%)
  - Chuck Fowler (DFL), 14,595 votes (43.98%)
  - Tim Hage (Independence) 2,862 votes (8.62%)
  - Write-in, 10 votes (0.03%)

== Personal life ==
She was married to Tom Rosen until 2010. Tom Rosen is the CEO of Rosen's Diversified, Inc., a Fairmont company that specializes in beef processing and agricultural chemical distribution and fertilizers. They are the parents of three children.

In 2005, she was honored as the first female to receive the Alumni of the Year award from the College of Agricultural Sciences at Colorado State University.
