= Greg Clausen =

American politician

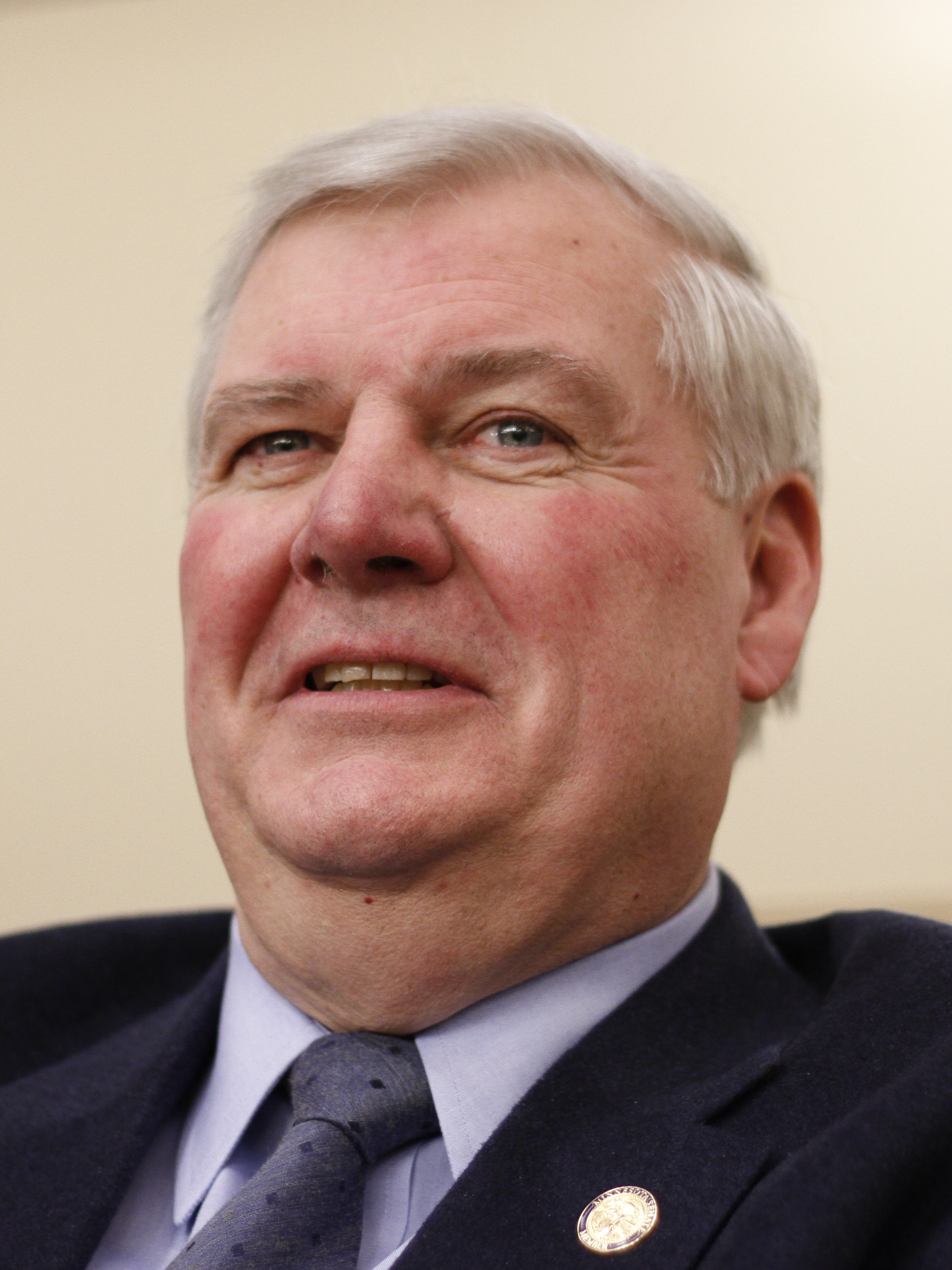

Member of the Minnesota Senate from the 57th district
- In office January 8, 2013 – January 2023
- Preceded by: Katie Sieben
- Succeeded by: Zach Duckworth

Personal details
- Born: October 8, 1947 (age 78)
- Party: Minnesota Democratic–Farmer–Labor Party
- Spouse: Roberta
- Children: 3
- Education: Augsburg University (B.A.); University of St. Thomas (M.A., Ed.S.)
- Occupation: legislator

Greg D. Clausen (born October 8, 1947) is a Minnesota politician and former member of the Minnesota Senate. A member of the Minnesota Democratic–Farmer–Labor Party (DFL), he represented District 57 in the southern Twin Cities metropolitan area, including Apple Valley, Rosemount, Northeast Lakeville, and Coates.

== Education ==
Clausen attended Augsburg University, graduating in 1969 with a B.A. in social sciences. He later attended the University of St. Thomas, graduating in 1973 with a M.A. in education curriculum and instruction and again in 1983, graduating with an Ed.S. in educational administration.

== Minnesota Senate ==
Clausen was first elected to the Minnesota Senate in 2012 and was re-elected in 2016 and 2020. Clausen served on the Senate Higher Education Finance and Policy Committee as the Ranking Minority Member and on the State Government Finance and Policy and Elections Committee. Clausen also serves on the Legislative Commission on Data Practices, Legislative Permanent School Fund Commission, Results First Advisory Committee, Educational Attainment Stakeholder Group, and Complete College America Alliance.

He chose to retire from politics and not stand for reelection in 2022.

== Personal life ==
Clausen is married to his wife, Roberta. They have three children and six grandchildren and reside in Apple Valley, Minnesota.
