= 2010 Minnesota Senate election =

Minnesota Senate election, 2010
- November 2, 2010

All 67 seats in the Minnesota Senate 34 seats needed for a majority
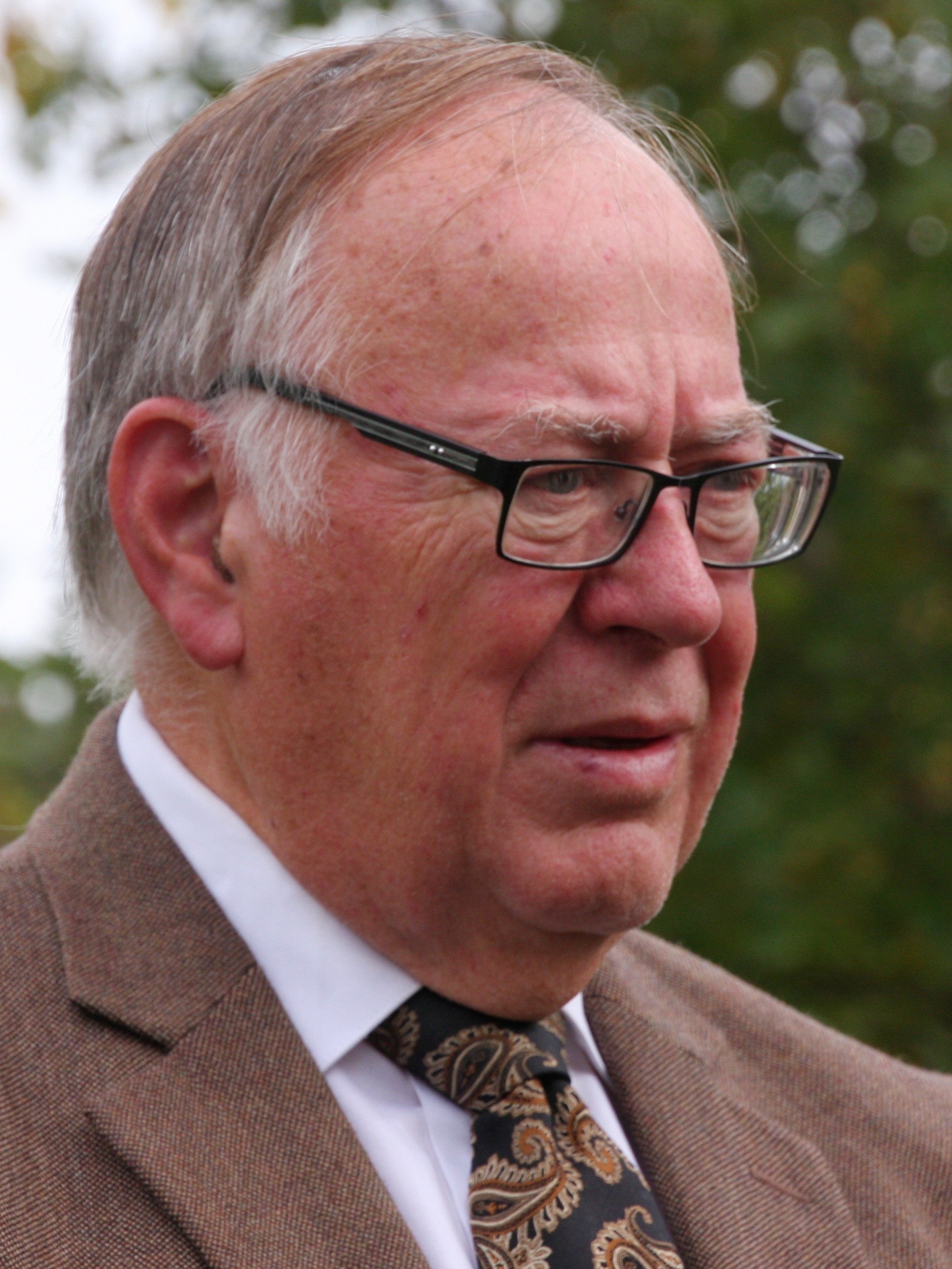

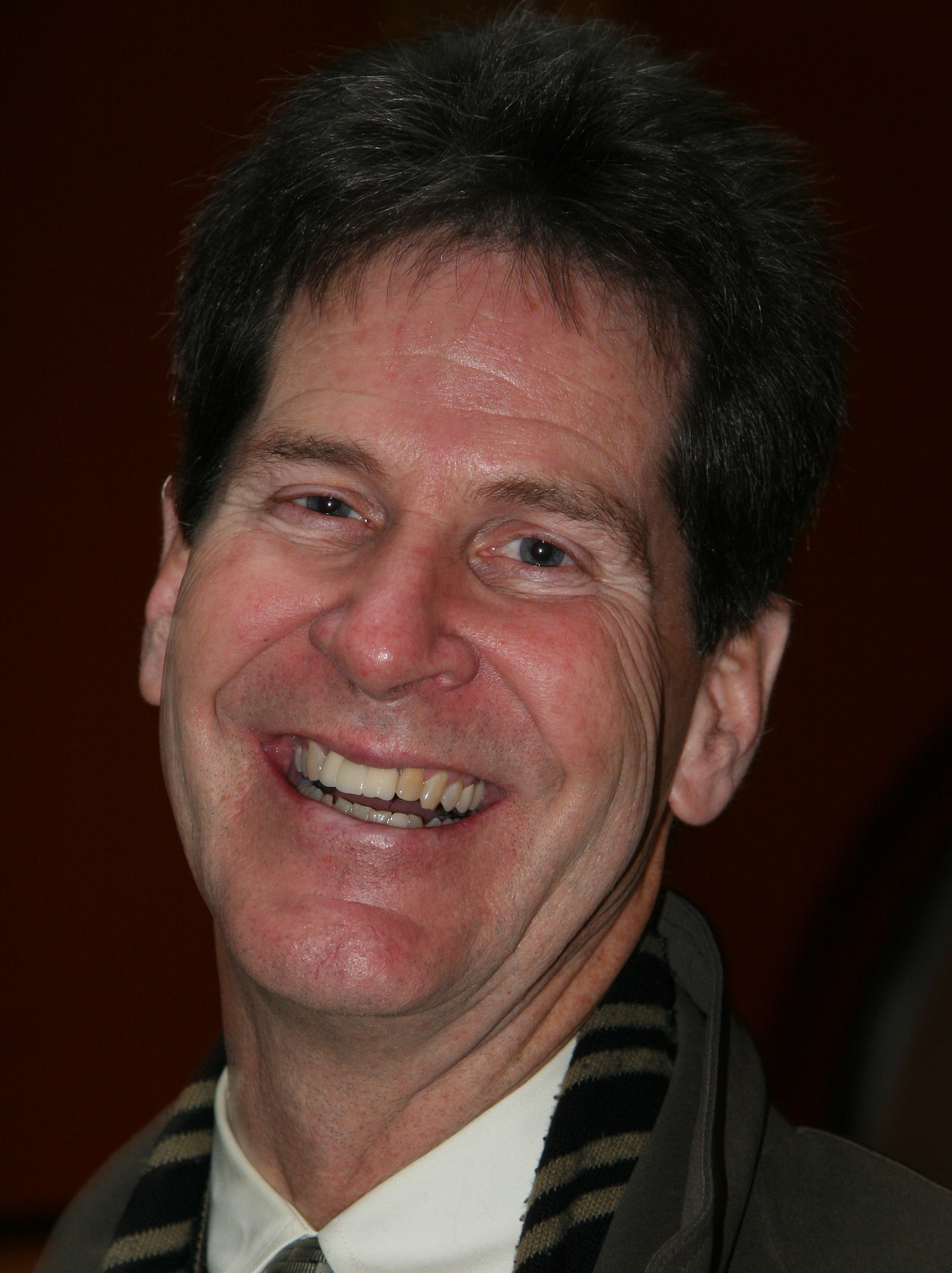
	Majority party	Minority party
Leader	Dave Senjem	Larry Pogemiller
Party	Republican	Democratic (DFL)
Leader since	November 10, 2006	November 9, 2006
Leader's seat	29th–Rochester	59th–Minneapolis
Last election	23 seats, 43.28%	44 seats, 55.31%
Seats before	21	46
Seats won	37	30
Seat change	▲16	▼16
Popular vote	1,021,634	1,005,132
Percentage	49.72%	48.91%
Swing	▲6.44 pp	▼6.40 pp
Majority Leader before election
Larry Pogemiller
Democratic (DFL)
Elected Majority Leader
Amy Koch
Republican

The 2010 Minnesota Senate election was held in the U.S. state of Minnesota on November 2, 2010, to elect members to the Senate of the 87th Minnesota Legislature. A primary election was held in several districts on August 10, 2010.

The Republican Party of Minnesota won a majority of seats, defeating the Minnesota Democratic–Farmer–Labor Party (DFL), which had a majority since the return of partisan elections to the Senate in 1976. The new Legislature convened on January 4, 2011.

== Predictions ==
Source	Ranking	As of
Governing	Likely D	November 1, 2010

== Results ==
Summary of the November 2, 2010 Minnesota Senate election results
Party	Candidates	Votes			Seats		
Party	Candidates	No.	%	∆pp	No.	∆No.	%
Republican Party of Minnesota	67	1,021,634	49.72	▲6.44	37	▲16	55.22
Minnesota Democratic–Farmer–Labor Party	65	1,005,132	48.91	▼6.40	30	▼16	44.78
Independence Party of Minnesota	7	14,086	0.69	▲0.04	0	Steady	0.00
Constitution Party of Minnesota	1	827	0.04	▲0.04	0	Steady	0.00
Independent	2	6,375	0.31	▲0.06	0	Steady	0.00
Write-in	N/A	6,813	0.33	▲0.08	0	Steady	0.00
Total		2,054,867	100.00	±0.00	67	±0	100.00
Invalid/blank votes		68,502	3.23	▼0.31			
Turnout (out of 3,803,192 eligible voters)		2,123,369	55.83	▼4.64			
Source: Minnesota Secretary of State, Minnesota Legislative Reference Library

=== Match-up summary ===
District	Incumbent	2010 Status	DFL	Republican	Independence	Result
1	LeRoy Stumpf	Re-election	LeRoy Stumpf	Roger Schmitz		DFL Hold
2	Rod Skoe	Re-election	Rod Skoe	Dennis Moser		DFL Hold
3	Tom Saxhaug	Re-election	Tom Saxhaug	Dan McGuire		DFL Hold
4	Mary Olson	Re-election	Mary Olson	John Carlson		GOP Gain
5	Dave Tomassoni	Re-election	Dave Tomassoni	Matt Matasich		DFL Hold
6	Tom Bakk	Re-election	Tom Bakk	Jennifer Havlick		DFL Hold
7	Yvonne Prettner Solon	Open	Roger Reinert	Jim Stauber		DFL Hold
8	Tony Lourey	Re-election	Tony Lourey	Mike Cummins		DFL Hold
9	Keith Langseth	Re-election	Keith Langseth	Jeff Backer		DFL Hold
10	Dan Skogen	Re-election	Dan Skogen	Gretchen Hoffman		GOP Gain
11	Bill Ingebrigtsen	Re-election	Jim Thoreen	Bill Ingebrigtsen		GOP Hold
12	Paul Koering	Open	Taylor Stevenson	Paul Gazelka		GOP Hold
13	Joe Gimse	Re-election	Larry Rice	Joe Gimse		GOP Hold
14	Michelle Fischbach	Re-election	Mike Sharp	Michelle Fischbach		GOP Hold
15	Tarryl Clark	Open	Bruce Hentges	John Pederson		GOP Gain
16	Lisa Fobbe	Re-election	Lisa Fobbe	Dave Brown		GOP Gain
17	Rick Olseen	Re-election	Rick Olseen	Sean Nienow		GOP Gain
18	Steve Dille	Open	Hal Kimball	Scott Newman	Richard Hoff	GOP Hold
19	Amy Koch	Re-election		Amy Koch		GOP Hold
20	Gary Kubly	Re-election	Gary Kubly	Gregg Kulberg		DFL Hold
21	Dennis Frederickson	Open	Al Kruse	Gary Dahms		GOP Hold
22	Jim Vickerman	Open	Kevin Vickerman	Doug Magnus		GOP Gain
23	Kathy Sheran	Re-election	Kathy Sheran	Peter Trocke		DFL Hold
24	Julie Rosen	Re-election		Julie Rosen		GOP Hold
25	Kevin Dahle	Re-election	Kevin Dahle	Al DeKruif		GOP Gain
26	Mike Parry	Re-election	Alex De Marco	Mike Parry		GOP Hold
27	Dan Sparks	Re-election	Dan Sparks	Kathy Green		DFL Hold
28	Steve Murphy	Open	Joe Fricke	John Howe		GOP Gain
29	Dave Senjem	Re-election	Greg French	Dave Senjem		GOP Hold
30	Ann Lynch	Re-election	Ann Lynch	Carla Nelson		GOP Gain
31	Sharon Erickson Ropes	Re-election	Sharon Erickson Ropes	Jeremy Miller		GOP Gain
32	Warren Limmer	Re-election		Warren Limmer		GOP Hold
33	Gen Olson	Re-election	Monica Dawson	Gen Olson		GOP Hold
34	Julianne Ortman	Re-election	Laura Helmer	Julianne Ortman	Tim Biros	GOP Hold
35	Claire Robling	Re-election	Travis Burton	Claire Robling		GOP Hold
36	Pat Pariseau	Open	Steve Quist	Dave Thompson		GOP Hold
37	Chris Gerlach	Re-election	Michael J. Germain	Chris Gerlach		GOP Hold
38	Jim Carlson	Re-election	Jim Carlson	Ted Daley		GOP Gain
39	James Metzen	Re-election	James Metzen	Rob Soleim		DFL Hold
40	John Doll	Re-election	John Doll	Dan Hall		GOP Gain
41	Geoff Michel	Re-election	Steve Elkins	Geoff Michel		GOP Hold
42	David Hann	Re-election	Ron Case	David Hann		GOP Hold
43	Terri Bonoff	Re-election	Terri Bonoff	Norann Dillon		DFL Hold
44	Ron Latz	Re-election	Ron Latz	Paul Scofield		DFL Hold
45	Ann Rest	Re-election	Ann Rest	Nick Petersen		DFL Hold
46	Linda Scheid	Re-election	Linda Scheid	Ryan Sibinski		DFL Hold
47	Leo Foley	Re-election	Leo Foley	Benjamin Kruse	Andrew Kratoska	GOP Gain
48	Mike Jungbauer	Re-election	Peter Perovich	Mike Jungbauer		GOP Hold
49	Debbie Johnson	Open	Paul Meunier	Michelle Benson		GOP Hold
50	Satveer Chaudhary	Re-election	Barb Goodwin	Gina Bauman		DFL Hold
51	Don Betzold	Re-election	Don Betzold	Pam Wolf		GOP Gain
52	Ray Vandeveer	Re-election	Becky Siekmeier	Ray Vandeveer	John McCallum	GOP Hold
53	Sandy Rummel	Re-election	Sandy Rummel	Roger Chamberlain		GOP Gain
54	John Marty	Re-election	John Marty	Timothy Johnson		DFL Hold
55	Chuck Wiger	Re-election	Chuck Wiger	Tami Ekstrand	Mark Jenkins	DFL Hold
56	Kathy Saltzman	Re-election	Kathy Saltzman	Ted Lillie		GOP Gain
57	Katie Sieben	Re-election	Katie Sieben	Karin Housley		DFL Hold
58	Linda Higgins	Re-election	Linda Higgins	Hayley Astrup		DFL Hold
59	Larry Pogemiller	Re-election	Larry Pogemiller	Barry Hickithier		DFL Hold
60	Scott Dibble	Re-election	Scott Dibble	Scot Pekarek		DFL Hold
61	Linda Berglin	Re-election	Linda Berglin	James Schlemmer		DFL Hold
62	Patricia Torres Ray	Re-election	Patricia Torres Ray	Patrick Elgin		DFL Hold
63	Ken Kelash	Re-election	Ken Kelash	Craig Marston		DFL Hold
64	Dick Cohen	Re-election	Dick Cohen	Anthony Hernandez		DFL Hold
65	Sandy Pappas	Re-election	Sandy Pappas	Rick Karschnia	Amy E. Smith	DFL Hold
66	Ellen Anderson	Re-election	Ellen Anderson	Greg Copeland		DFL Hold
67	Mee Moua	Open	John Harrington	Krysia Weidell	Dino Guerin	DFL Hold

== See also ==
- Minnesota House of Representatives election, 2010
- Minnesota gubernatorial election, 2010
- Minnesota elections, 2010
