= Larry Pogemiller =

American politician

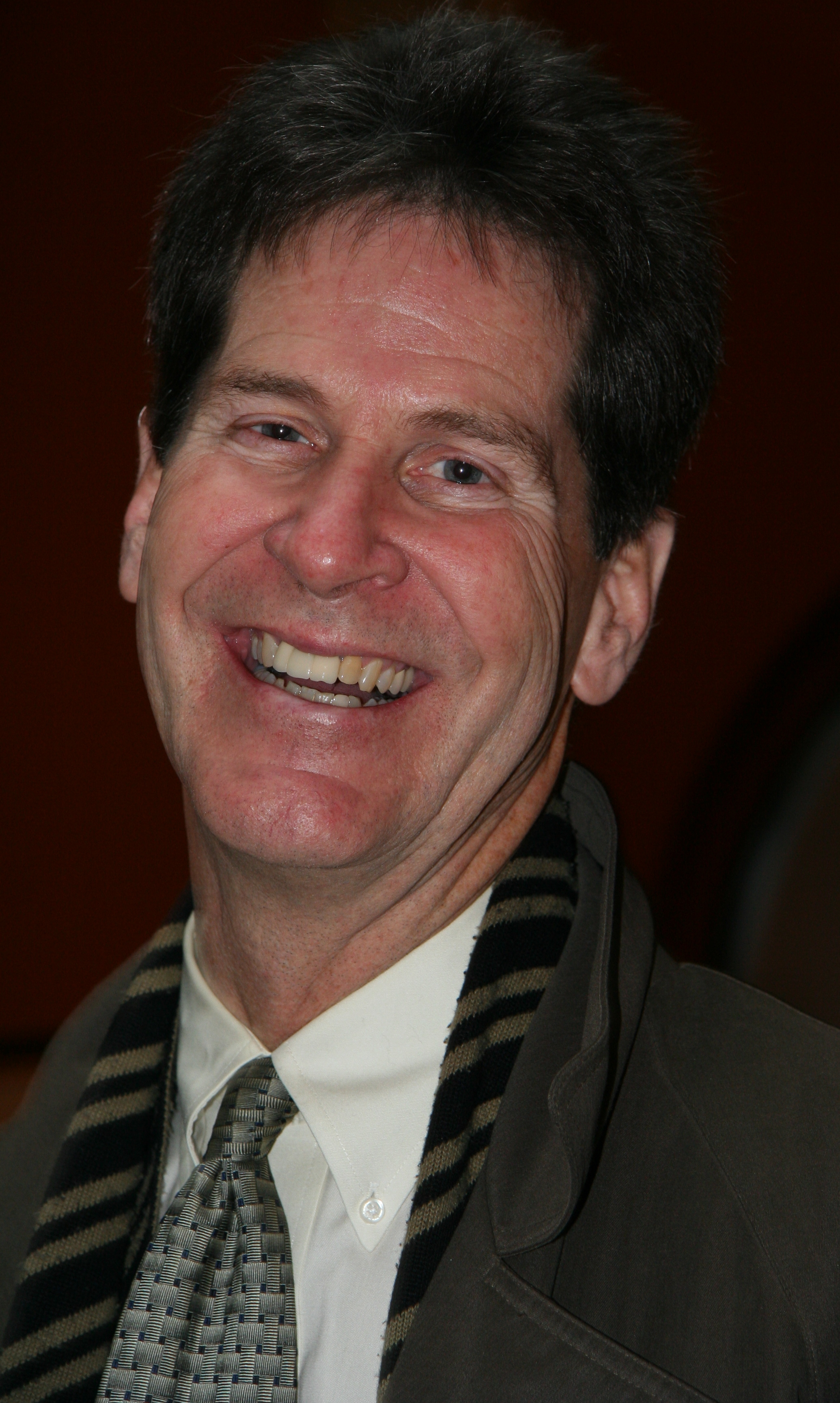
- Pogemiller in 2011

Commissioner of the Minnesota Office of Higher Education
- In office October 28, 2011 – January 2019

Majority Leader of the Minnesota Senate
- In office January 2007 – January 4, 2011
- Preceded by: Dean Johnson
- Succeeded by: Amy Koch

Minnesota State Senator from the 59th District
- In office January 1993 – November 7, 2011
- Preceded by: Allan Spear
- Succeeded by: Kari Dziedzic

Minnesota State Senator from the 58th District
- In office January 1983 – January 1993
- Preceded by: Eric D. Petty
- Succeeded by: Carl W. Kroening

Minnesota State Representative from District 55A
- In office January 1981 – January 1983
- Preceded by: Stanley J. Fudro
- Succeeded by: Connie Levi

Personal details
- Born: September 18, 1951 (age 75) Minneapolis, Minnesota, U.S.
- Party: Democratic
- Domestic partner: Jill
- Children: 2
- Education: University of Minnesota; Harvard University
- Occupation: system project analyst, legislator

Lawrence "Larry" J. Pogemiller (born September 18, 1951) is an American politician from Minnesota, and a former Commissioner of the Minnesota Office of Higher Education. A member of the Minnesota Democratic-Farmer-Labor Party, he represented northeast Minneapolis districts in the Minnesota Legislature from 1981 to 2011, and served as the Senate's 9th majority leader from 2007 to 2011. As majority leader, he was chair of the Senate Rules Committee and its subcommittees, and also served on the Senate Tax Committee.

Pogemiller was born in Minneapolis and graduated from DeLaSalle High School in 1969. He was first elected to the Minnesota House of Representatives in 1980, serving as the representative of District 55A from 1981 to 1983. After serving one term, he was elected to the Senate in 1982, serving the old District 58 prior to the 1992 redistricting and, thereafter, District 59. He was re-elected in every general election. Governor of Minnesota Mark Dayton appointed him Director of the Higher Education office in October 2011. He held the position until the end of Dayton's governorship in 2019.

Pogemiller is known for his outspoken, assertive leadership style and his strategic thinking. Reporter Tom Scheck of Minnesota Public Radio called him "a brilliant and combative political tactician who often speaks his mind". Former Minnesota House Speaker Steve Sviggum called him "a very frustrating individual as he runs the clock past midnight all the time." Pogemiller had a rocky relationship with former Republican governor Tim Pawlenty.

Political offices
Preceded by Dean Johnson	Minnesota Senate Majority Leader; 2007–2011	Succeeded by Amy Koch
