= Julianne Ortman =

American politician

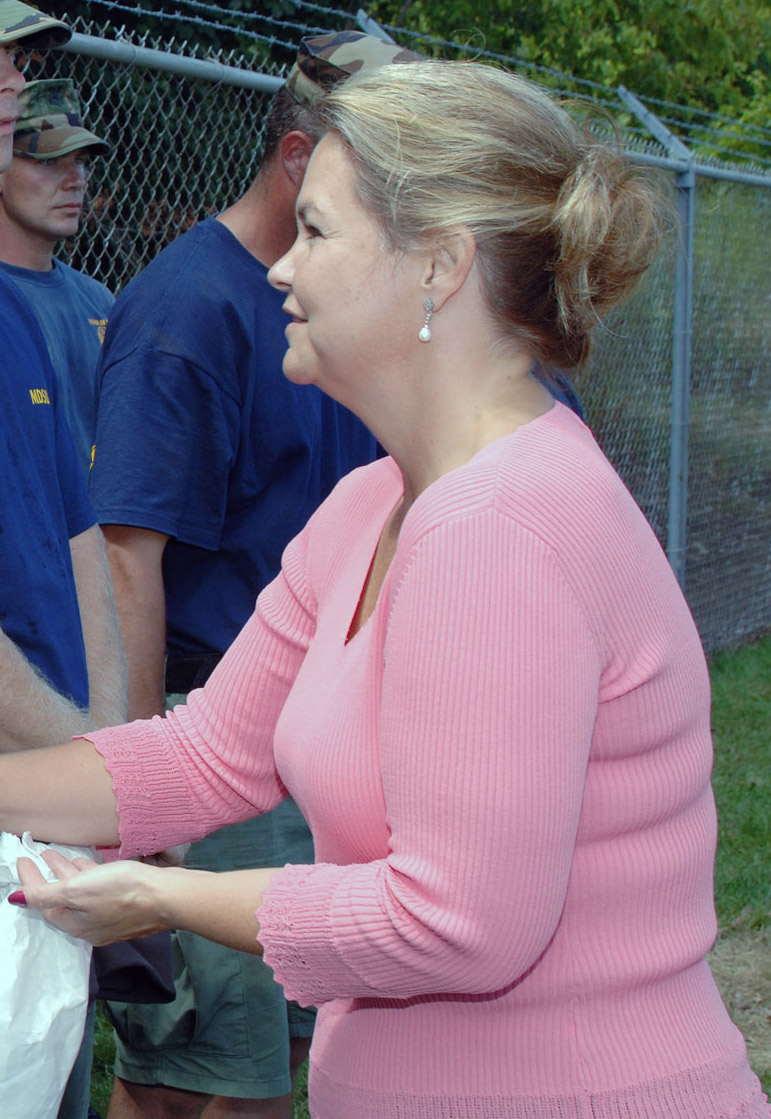

Member of the Minnesota Senate
- In office January 7, 2003 – January 2, 2017
- Succeeded by: Scott Jensen
- Constituency: 47th (2013–2017)
- Constituency: 34th (2003–2013)

Personal details
- Born: Julianne Ellen Ryan; August 29, 1962 (age 64) Sioux Falls, South Dakota, U.S.
- Party: Republican
- Spouse: Ray Ortman (m. 1989)
- Children: 4
- Education: Macalester College; University of Pennsylvania

Julianne Ellen Ortman (née Ryan; born August 29, 1962) is an American lawyer who is a former member of the Minnesota Senate. A member of the Republican Party of Minnesota, she represented portions of Carver, Hennepin, and Scott counties in the southwestern Twin Cities metropolitan area. She was a candidate in the 2014 United States Senate election in Minnesota until she was eliminated at the state convention.

== Early life, education, and career ==
She was born Julianne Ellen Ryan on August 29, 1962, and she is the daughter of Robert Clair Ryan. Ortman graduated from Macalester College in Saint Paul in 1986 with a Bachelor of Arts in English and another in history. Then went on to the University of Pennsylvania Law School in Philadelphia, Pennsylvania, graduating with a Juris Doctor in 1989. She was an adjunct professor at George Washington University in Washington, D.C. from 1992 to 1994.

Ortman was an elected Carver County Commissioner from 2001 to 2003. She is an attorney by profession, heading up Ortman & Associates law firm in Chanhassen. She worked as a chief of staff for Hennepin County sheriff Rich Stanek from 2007 to 2018.

== Minnesota Senate ==
Ortman was first elected to the Senate in 2002, and was reelected in 2006, 2010 and 2012. She served as an assistant minority leader during the 2007–2008 legislative session. On January 3, 2012, Ortman was named Deputy Majority Leader by Majority Leader Dave Senjem. Ortman replaced Geoff Michel, who lost his position in a shake-up of Republican leadership following the resignation of former Majority Leader Amy Koch. She was the ranking minority member of the Taxes Committee, and a member of the Judiciary and Public Safety Committee. She did not seek re-election in 2016.

== 2014 United States Senate campaign ==
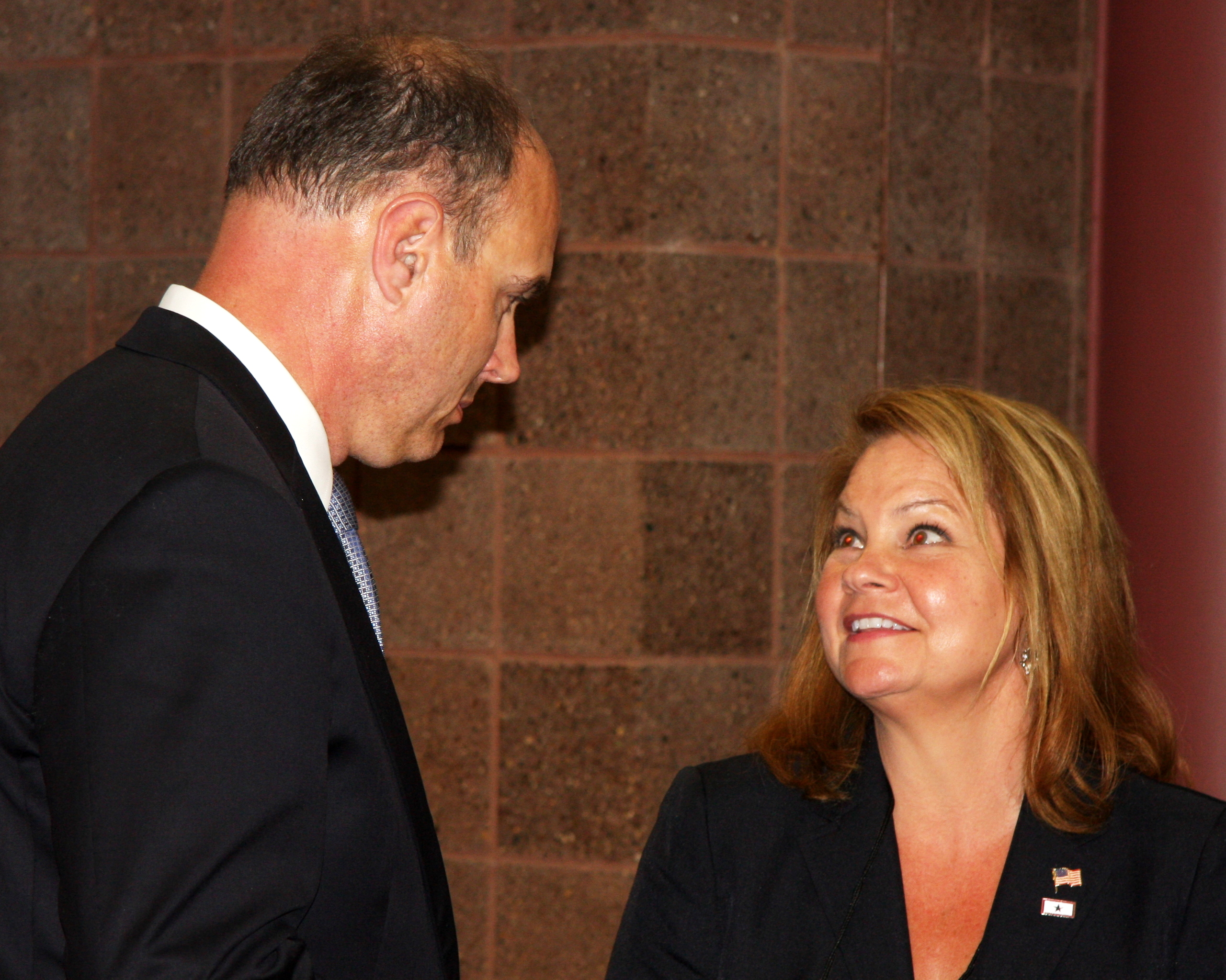
Ortman consulting with Rich Stanek at the Minnesota Republican State Convention in 2014

On August 3, 2013, Ortman announced her candidacy in the 2014 United States Senate election in Minnesota. Ortman was endorsed by Sarah Palin, the former governor of Alaska, in March 2014. She was eliminated at the May Convention in the 5th round of voting by delegates, with 19.97% of the votes, falling just 1 vote shy of the 20% needed to advance to the 6th round.

== Other ==
She has been a director on the Southwest Transportation Coalition since 2001. She was the chair of the Instate Compact on Sentencing, and a member of the Minnesota Compensation Council.

On February 21, 2008, Ortman requested that the Subcommittee on ethics determine whether she had a conflict of interest as chief author of two bills, SF294 and SF2984, due to her employment as the Finance Director in the Office of the Hennepin County Sheriff. The Subcommittee considered the issue on March 6, 2008, and concluded that she did not have a conflict of interest as the chief author of either of the two bills.

In 2019, Ortman began working for Polk County, Florida Sheriff Grady Judd.

Ortman is a co-owner of consulting firm Public Safety Strategies Group with Rich Stanek.

== Personal life ==
Ortman is Catholic. She married Ray Ortman in 1989. They have four children. In 2019, Ortman moved to Florida.
