= Senator Doll =

Senator Doll may refer to:

- Henry W. Doll (1870–?), New York State Senate
- John Doll (Kansas politician) (born 1957), Kansas State Senate
- John P. Doll (born 1961), Minnesota State Senate
