= Geoff Michel =

American politician

Member of the Minnesota Senate from the 41st district
- In office January 7, 2003 – January 7, 2013
- Preceded by: Roy Terwilliger (District 42)
- Succeeded by: Melisa Franzen (District 49)

Minnesota Senate Deputy Majority Leader
- In office January 4, 2011 – December 27, 2011
- Preceded by: Position Created
- Succeeded by: Julianne Ortman

Personal details
- Born: November 13, 1963 (age 62)
- Party: Republican Party of Minnesota
- Spouse: Annie
- Children: 4
- Education: Dartmouth College; University of Minnesota Law School
- Occupation: attorney, legislator

Geoff Michel (born November 13, 1963) is a Minnesota politician and former member of the Minnesota Senate who represented District 41, which included portions of the southwestern Twin Cities suburbs of Edina and Bloomington in Hennepin County. A Republican, he was first elected to the Senate in 2002, succeeding retiring Senator Roy Terwilliger, who represented the area as District 42 before the 2002 legislative redistricting. Michel was reelected in 2006 and 2010.

Michel was named deputy majority leader in January 2011. In December 2011 he briefly served as interim majority leader after the resignation of former leader Amy Koch, leaving the position when the Republican caucus replaced its leadership team. Michel is chair of the Senate Jobs and Economic Growth Committee and of the Senate Rules and Administration Subcommittee for Redistricting. He also served on the Senate's Rules and Administration and Taxes committees, and on the Rules and Administration subcommittees for Committees and for Conference Committees. Michel was an assistant minority leader from 2005 to 2011. His special legislative concerns included education, transportation, and taxes.

In March 2012, Michel announced he would not seek reelection to the Minnesota Senate. On March 19, 2012, an ethics complaint was filed against Michel by Senator Sandy Pappas. Pappas claimed that Michel had “betrayed the public’s trust” by providing an inaccurate statement to the media and that he had brought “dishonor and disrepute” to the Minnesota Senate. The Minnesota Senate Rules and Administration Subcommittee on Ethical Conduct conducted two hearings into the complaint, but deadlocked on a resolution. The ethics complaint against Michel remains unresolved.

The short time that Michel served as Interim Senate Majority Leader has come under additional scrutiny due to a pending lawsuit from a former employee of the Minnesota Senate, Michael Brodkorb. Michel was listed in initial paperwork regarding Brodkorb's planned lawsuit over his termination from the Minnesota Senate. On May 25, 2012, the Minnesota Senate released legal bills showing they had spent $46,150 in the first 3 months of 2012 to prepare a defense to Brodkorb's suit.

On June 19, 2012, the Minnesota Senate announced additional legal bills in the amount of $38,533, bringing the total legal costs incurred by the Minnesota Senate due to the termination of Brodkorb to almost $85,000 since the end of the May 2012.

Michel is an attorney, and works as a corporate counsel for Securian Financial Group. He also served as legal counsel for Minnesota Governor Arne Carlson's office from 1990 to 1994, and was a legislative assistant to former U.S. Congressman Bill Frenzel. He graduated from Minnetonka High School in Minnetonka, then attended Dartmouth College in Hanover, New Hampshire, earning a B.A. degree. He went on to the University of Minnesota Law School, earning a J.D. degree.

Michel has served on various government and community boards and organizations. He is a former board member of the Minnesota Chamber of Commerce, and a former chair of the chamber's education committee. He is also a former member of the Minnesota Pollution Control Agency Citizen Board. He is a board member of the Minnesota Children's Museum, and of the Edina Soccer Club.
