= A. H. Miller =

A. H. Miller may refer to:

- Alden H. Miller (1906–1965), American ornithologist
- Archie H. Miller (1886–1958), Lieutenant Governor of Minnesota
