= John M. Zwach =

American politician

John M. Zwach Sr.
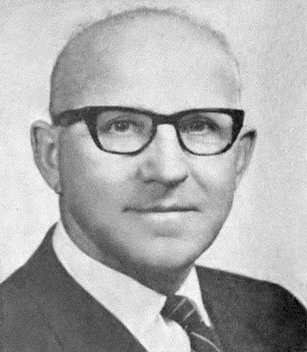
- Zwach in 1971

Member of the U.S. House of Representatives from Minnesota's 6th district
- In office January 3, 1967 – January 3, 1975
- Preceded by: Alec G. Olson
- Succeeded by: Richard Nolan

Minnesota Senate Majority Leader
- In office January 6, 1959 – January 2, 1967
- Preceded by: Archie H. Miller
- Succeeded by: Stanley W. Holmquist

Member of the Minnesota State Senate
- In office January 7, 1947 – January 2, 1967
- Succeeded by: Carl Jensen

Member of the Minnesota House of Representatives
- In office January 8, 1935 – January 6, 1947

Personal details
- Born: John Matthew Zwach; February 8, 1907 Gales Township, Redwood County, Minnesota, U.S.
- Died: November 11, 1990 (aged 83) Lucan, Minnesota, U.S.
- Resting place: St. Michael's Cemetery
- Party: Republican
- Spouse: Agnes
- Children: 5, including Barbara
- Education: University of Minnesota; Minnesota State University, Mankato
- Occupation: School Principal; Teacher

John Matthew Zwach Sr. (February 8, 1907 – November 11, 1990) was an American farmer, rural school teacher, and politician. Zwach was most notably a U.S. representative from Minnesota, serving four terms from 1967 to 1975. He also served for several terms in the Minnesota Legislature, serving in the Minnesota House of Representatives from 1935 to 1947 and the Minnesota Senate from 1947 until his departure for federal office in 1967. A Republican, Zwach was Minnesota Senate Majority Leader from 1959 until his departure.

== Biography ==
Zwach was born in Gales Township, Redwood County, Minnesota, the son of Austrian immigrants. He attended the public schools and graduated from Milroy High School in 1926. He then received a teaching certificate from Mankato State College (now Minnesota State University, Mankato) in 1927 and graduated from the University of Minnesota in 1933. He worked as a school teacher and superintendent for fourteen years and was also an active farmer.

=== State legislature ===
Zwach served in the Minnesota House of Representatives from 1934 to 1946. He was a member of the Minnesota Senate from 1946 to 1966 and was the majority leader from 1959 to 1966, leading the Conservative Caucus in the nonpartisan body. He was also a member of the Interim Agriculture Commission, 1955–1957.

=== Congress ===
He was elected as a Republican to the 90th, 91st, 92nd and 93rd congresses, (January 3, 1967 – January 3, 1975). He was not a candidate for reelection in 1974. He is the last alphabetical name of all time in Congress.

=== Retirement and death ===
He was a resident of Lucan, Minnesota until his death on November 11, 1990. He was buried at St. Michael's Cemetery.

== Family ==
His daughter, Barb Sykora, served in the Minnesota House of Representatives from 1995 to 2007.

U.S. House of Representatives
Preceded by Alec G. Olson	U.S. Representative from Minnesota's 6th congressional district 1967–1975	Succeeded by Richard Nolan
