= Tina Liebling =

American politician

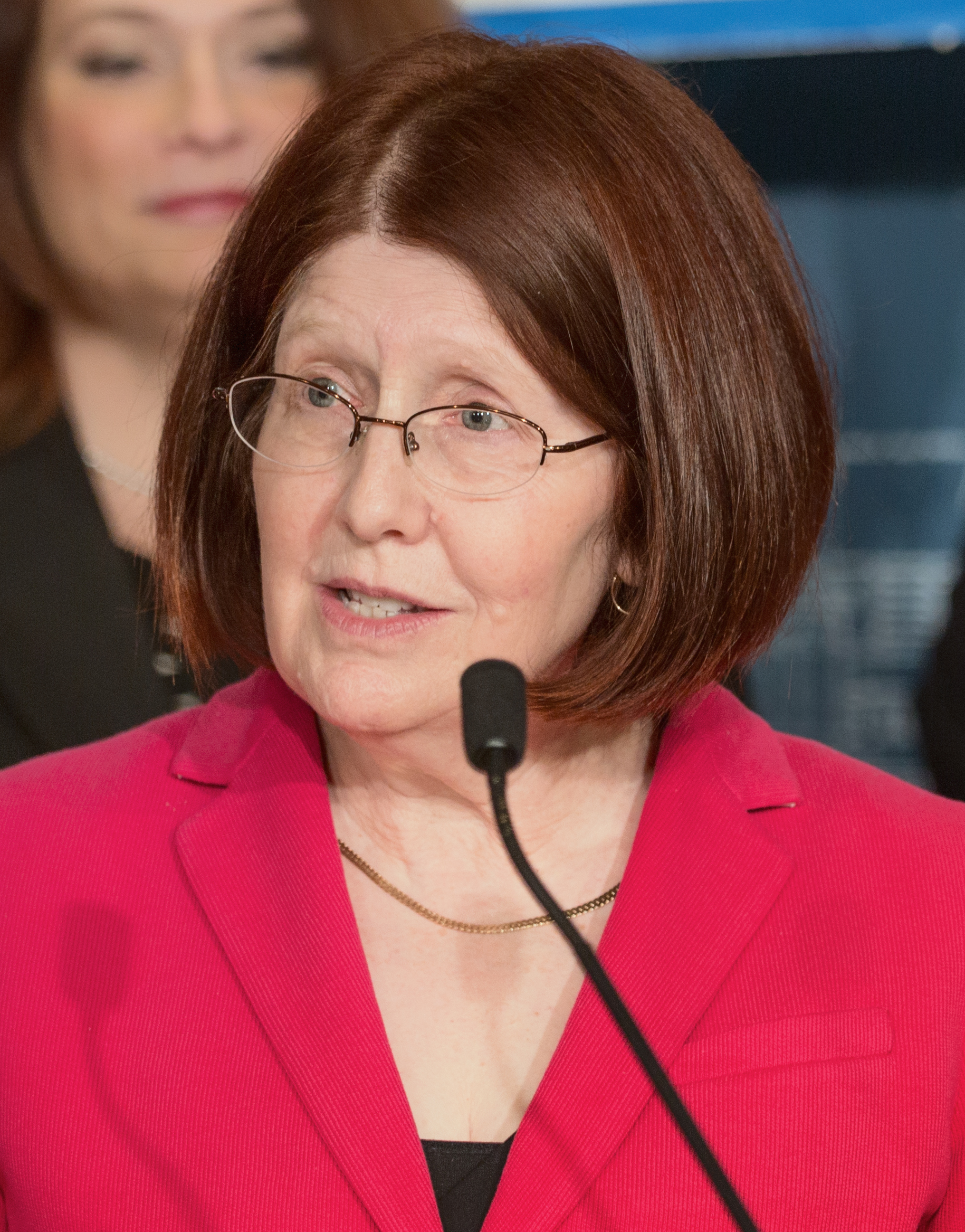

Member of the Minnesota House of Representatives
- Incumbent
- Assumed office January 4, 2005
- Preceded by: Carla Nelson
- Constituency: 30A district (2005–2013); 26A district (2013–2023); 24B district (2023–present)

Personal details
- Born: 1953 (age 72–73) Minneapolis, Minnesota, U.S.
- Party: Minnesota Democratic–Farmer–Labor Party
- Spouse: Mark
- Children: 3
- Education: University of Minnesota; University of Massachusetts-Amherst; Boston University School of Law
- Occupation: attorney, legislator

Tina Liebling (/ˈliːblɪŋ/ LEE-bling; born 1953) is a Minnesota attorney and politician who represents District 24B in the Minnesota House of Representatives. She is a member of the Minnesota Democratic–Farmer–Labor Party (DFL). Her district consists almost entirely of the city of Rochester in Olmsted County, in southeastern Minnesota. Liebling ran for governor of Minnesota in 2018, but withdrew from the race in March.

== Early life and education ==
Liebling was born and raised in Minneapolis, Minnesota, the daughter of photographer Jerome Liebling. After her family moved away from the area, she returned to attend the University of Minnesota, earning a B.A. in Spanish and graduating magna cum laude. She then earned an M.S. in public health from the University of Massachusetts-Amherst and a J.D., cum laude, from the Boston University School of Law.

== Political career ==
Liebling's political career began in 2002, when she first ran to represent District 30A and finished second behind former state representative Carla Nelson in a three-way race. She ran again in 2004, defeating Nelson with 50.75% of the vote. She and Andy Welti, a former DFL representative from District 30B, were part of large DFL gains in the Minnesota House in 2004. The two were the first Democrats to represent the Rochester area, formerly a Republican stronghold, in many years. She was sworn in on January 4, 2005.

Liebling was reelected in 2006 with 52.76% of the vote, again defeating Nelson. In 2008, she defeated Rochester businessman Jacob Dettinger with 61.81% of the vote. In 2010, she defeated Charlie O'Connell with 55.15% of the vote to his 44.73%. In 2012, running in a slightly altered district due to redistricting, she defeated Breanna Bly, a Rochester School Board member, 58.8% to 41.0%. She defeated Bly again in 2014, 55.2% to 44.7%. In 2016, she defeated political novice Will Waggoner, 59.9% to 40.0%. In 2018, she defeated former Olmsted County Commissioner Paul Wilson, 63.2% to 36.6%.

Liebling served as an assistant majority leader during the 2007-08 session, but declined to serve again in that position in 2009-10. She became the DFL lead on the Health and Human Services (HHS) Reform Committee for the 2011-12 biennium and also served on the Health and Human Service Finance and Judiciary Policy and Finance Committees. When the DFL retook the majority after the 2012 election, she became chair of the Health and Human Services Policy Committee for the 2013-14 biennium. She also served on the Health and Human Services Finance Committee, the Civil Law Committee, and the Taxes Committee. After Republicans retook the majority in the 2014 election, she was the DFL health care lead on the HHS Finance Committee in 2015-2017, also serving on the HHS Reform and the Ways and Means Committees, and the DFL lead on the HHS Reform Committee in 2017-2018, also serving on the HHS Finance and Ways and Means Committees. After the DFL retook control of the House in 2019, she was chair of the Health and Human Services Finance Division, which controls a third of the state’s budget. She also served on the HHS Policy Committee and the Judiciary Finance and Civil Law Division.

Liebling supported Senator Bernie Sanders during the 2016 Democratic presidential primaries, breaking with state party leadership. She supported Elizabeth Warren in the 2020 Democratic presidential primaries.

== 2018 gubernatorial campaign ==
On April 2, 2017, Liebling announced her candidacy for governor of Minnesota. Governor Mark Dayton did not seek reelection. She finished fifth in the February 2018 DFL gubernatorial preference poll, with about 6% of the vote, and dropped out of the race in March.

== Personal life ==
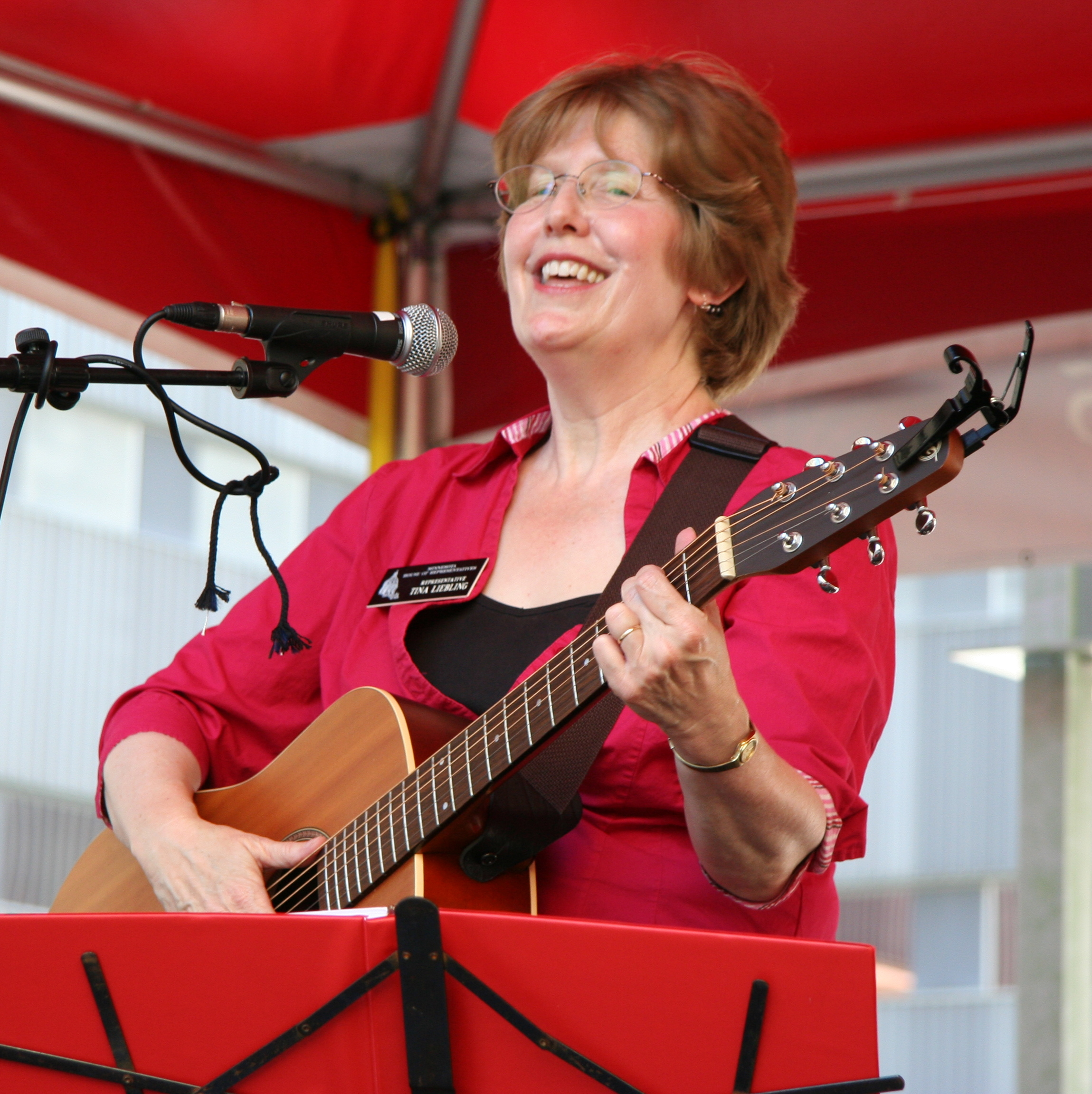
Rep. Liebling playing guitar in Rochester

Liebling married Mark Liebow shortly after law school and moved to the Chicago area, where her three children were born. In 1994, she moved to Rochester, where Liebow was hired as a consultant for the Mayo Clinic, and began a solo law practice focused on criminal law. She is Jewish.

== Election history ==
2022 Minnesota State Representative- House 24B
Party	Candidate	Votes	%	±%
Democratic (DFL)	Tina Liebling (Incumbent)	9922	56.40	
Republican	Katrina Pulham	7661	43.55	

2020 Minnesota State Representative- House 26A
Party	Candidate	Votes	%	±%
Democratic (DFL)	Tina Liebling (Incumbent)	13207	63.85	
Republican	Gary Melin	7443	35.99	

2018 Minnesota State Representative- House 26A
Party	Candidate	Votes	%	±%
Democratic (DFL)	Tina Liebling (Incumbent)	10429	63.21	
Republican	Paul Wilson	6047	36.65	

2016 Minnesota State Representative- House 26A
Party	Candidate	Votes	%	±%
Democratic (DFL)	Tina Liebling (Incumbent)	10737	59.89	
Republican	Will Waggoner	7168	39.98	

2014 Minnesota State Representative- House 26A
Party	Candidate	Votes	%	±%
Democratic (DFL)	Tina Liebling (Incumbent)	6244	55.23	
Republican	Breanna Bly	5050	44.67	

2012 Minnesota State Representative- House 26A
Party	Candidate	Votes	%	±%
Democratic (DFL)	Tina Liebling (Incumbent)	10484	58.80	
Republican	Breanna Bly	7306	40.97	

2010 Minnesota State Representative- House 30A
Party	Candidate	Votes	%	±%
Democratic (DFL)	Tina Liebling (Incumbent)	6814	55.15	−6.66
Republican	Charlie O'Connell	5527	44.73	−

2008 Minnesota State Representative- House 30A
Party	Candidate	Votes	%	±%
Democratic (DFL)	Tina Liebling (Incumbent)	10768	61.81	+9.05
Republican	Jake Dettinger	6624	38.02	−

2006 Minnesota State Representative- House 30A
Party	Candidate	Votes	%	±%
Democratic (DFL)	Tina Liebling (Incumbent)	7106	52.76	+2.01
Republican	Carla Nelson	6336	47.04	−2.10

2004 Minnesota State Representative- House 30A
Party	Candidate	Votes	%	±%
Democratic (DFL)	Tina Liebling	8712	50.75	+17.60
Republican	Carla Nelson (Incumbent)	8435	49.14	+9.37

2002 Minnesota State Representative- House 30A
Party	Candidate	Votes	%	±%
Democratic (DFL)	Tina Liebling	4446	33.15	−
Republican	Carla Nelson	5334	39.77	−
Independence	Joe Duffy	3618	26.98	−

Minnesota House of Representatives
Preceded by Carla Nelson	Member of the House of Representatives from the 26A district 30A (2005–2013); 2005–present	Incumbent
