= Michael Brodkorb =

American blogger

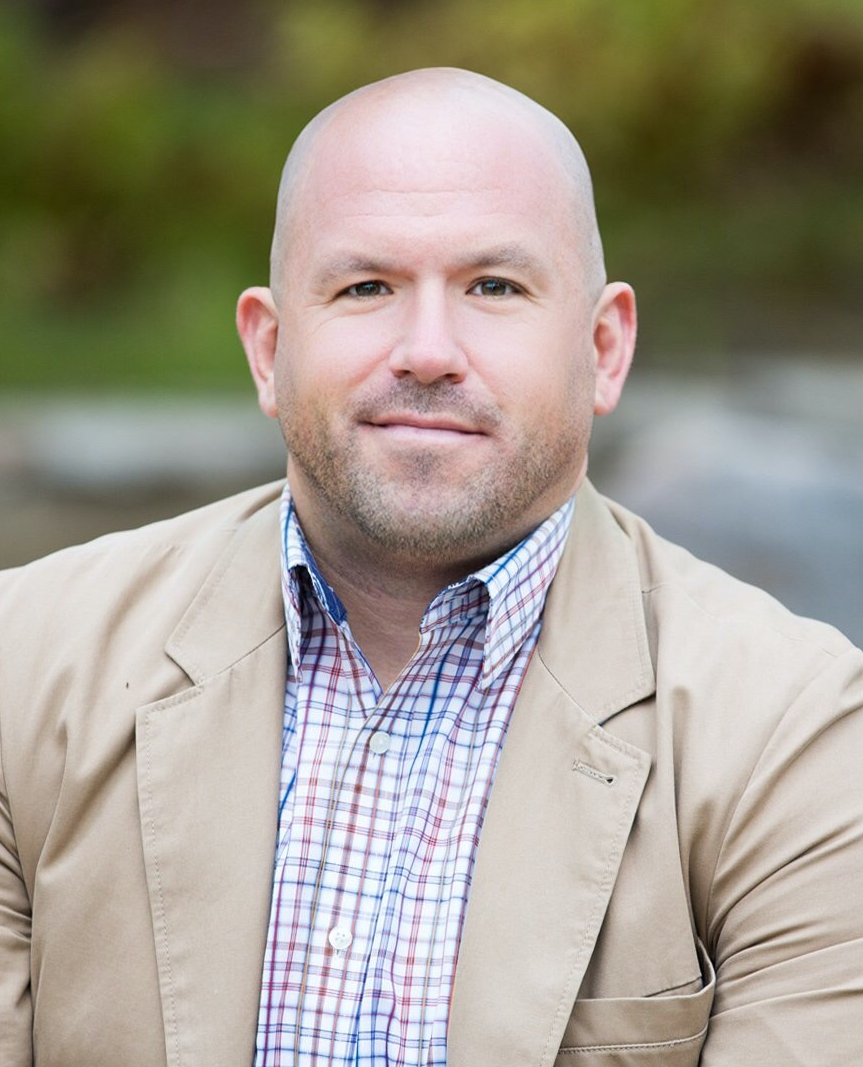

Former Deputy Chair of the Republican Party of Minnesota
- In office 2009–2011

Personal details
- Party: Republican
- Education: University of Minnesota Duluth University of Minnesota - Twin Cities
- Occupation: Communications consultant, media specialist, researcher, author, and former Minnesota Republican activist.
- Website: https://michaelbrodkorb.com

Michael Brodkorb is an American communications consultant, media specialist, researcher, author and former Minnesota Republican activist.

== Personal life ==
He graduated from high school in Forest Lake, Minnesota in 1992. He attended both the University of Minnesota Duluth and the University of Minnesota - Twin Cities.

He lives in Eagan, Minnesota, with his wife and three children.

== Writing and media career ==
Brodkorb's work as a special correspondent to the Star Tribune led him to author his first book, The Girls Are Gone, published by WiseInk Publishing in October, 2018. Brodkorb served as a columnist at MinnPost while writing The Girls Are Gone. In 2019, The Girls Are Gone was awarded a gold medal IPPY Award for excellence in true crime.

Brodkorb created and maintains a website related to his work on the Minnesota case on which The Girls Are Gone is based. Missing in Minnesota began as a place for case updates and has transitioned into the online companion to The Girls Are Gone.

Brodkorb also serves as a volunteer speaker for Minnesotans for Safe Driving. “I used to travel the state on behalf of candidates ...” Brodkorb said in an interview... “And now I travel and speak to groups about how lucky I feel to be alive.”

== Early career ==
Brodkorb is the former deputy chair of the Republican Party of Minnesota, former communications director for the Republican caucus in the Minnesota Senate, under Senator Minority Leader David Senjem and later to Amy Koch when she was the majority leader of the state senate.

In his role as an aide to Senjem and Koch, he is credited with helping to engineer the Republican takeover of the state senate in 2010.

He was the creator of the blog Minnesota Democrats Exposed.

Brodkorb served as deputy chair of the Minnesota Republican Party from 2009 to 2011, when he resigned to work for the congressional campaign of Minnesota state senator Mike Parry. Brodkorb resigned both from his position in the Senate and his position with the Parry campaign in December 2011.

On January 23, 2013, Brodkorb was injured in a single-car crash on Interstate 35E when his vehicle hit a concrete wall. He pleaded guilty to driving while intoxicated and was ordered to pay a $500 fine.

== Bibliography ==
Publication year	Title	ISBN
2018	The Girls Are Gone	978-1634891653
