= Barb Sykora =

American politician

Member of the Minnesota House of Representatives from the 33B district
- In office 2003–2006

Member of the Minnesota House of Representatives from the 43B district
- In office 1995–2002

Personal details
- Born: Barbara Jean Zwach; March 5, 1941 (age 85) Lyon County, Minnesota, U.S.
- Party: Republican
- Spouse: Bob Sykora
- Children: 4
- Education: College of St. Catherine
- Occupation: teacher

Barbara Jean Sykora (born March 5, 1941) is an American politician in the state of Minnesota. She served in the Minnesota House of Representatives. She is the daughter of late Congressman John M. Zwach.
