= Charles N. Orr =

American politician

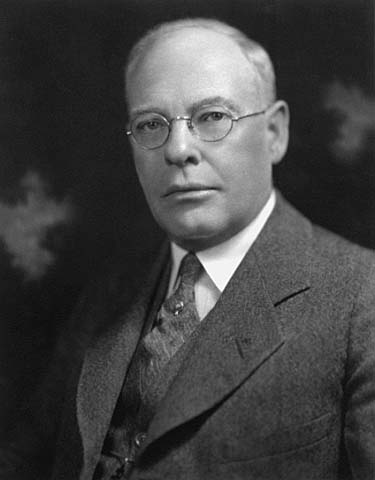
- Orr in 1920

1st Minnesota Senate Majority Leader
- In office January 1933 – January 10, 1949
- Preceded by: Office Created
- Succeeded by: Archie H. Miller

Minnesota State Senator
- In office 1915–1949

Minnesota State Representative
- In office 1911–1915

Personal details
- Born: Charles Noah Orr; June 7, 1877 Princeton, Minnesota, U.S.
- Died: January 10, 1949 (aged 71) St. Paul, Minnesota, U.S.
- Party: Republican; Nonpartisan, Conservative Caucus
- Spouse: Ellen May Adams
- Children: Marian and Janet
- Education: Carleton College; Hamline University; St. Paul College of Law
- Occupation: Attorney

Charles Noah Orr (June 7, 1877 – January 10, 1949) was a Minnesota politician and the first Majority Leader of the Minnesota Senate.

== Early life ==
Orr was born on June 7, 1877 in Princeton, Minnesota to Abraham and Ella Orr. He attended and graduated from Princeton High School.

== Political career ==
Orr worked as an attorney and in the office of the state auditor before being elected to office. He was first elected to the Minnesota House of Representatives in 1910, and was elected to the Senate in 1914. He served in the Senate for the rest of his life, becoming the first Majority Leader of the body in 1933, representing the Conservative Caucus in the then-nonpartisan body.

== Personal life ==
Orr was married to Ellen May Adams, who died on June 12, 1938. The couple had two daughters, Marian and Janet.

Orr died of a heart attack on the way to the capitol on January 10, 1949.
