= Mark Koran =

American politician

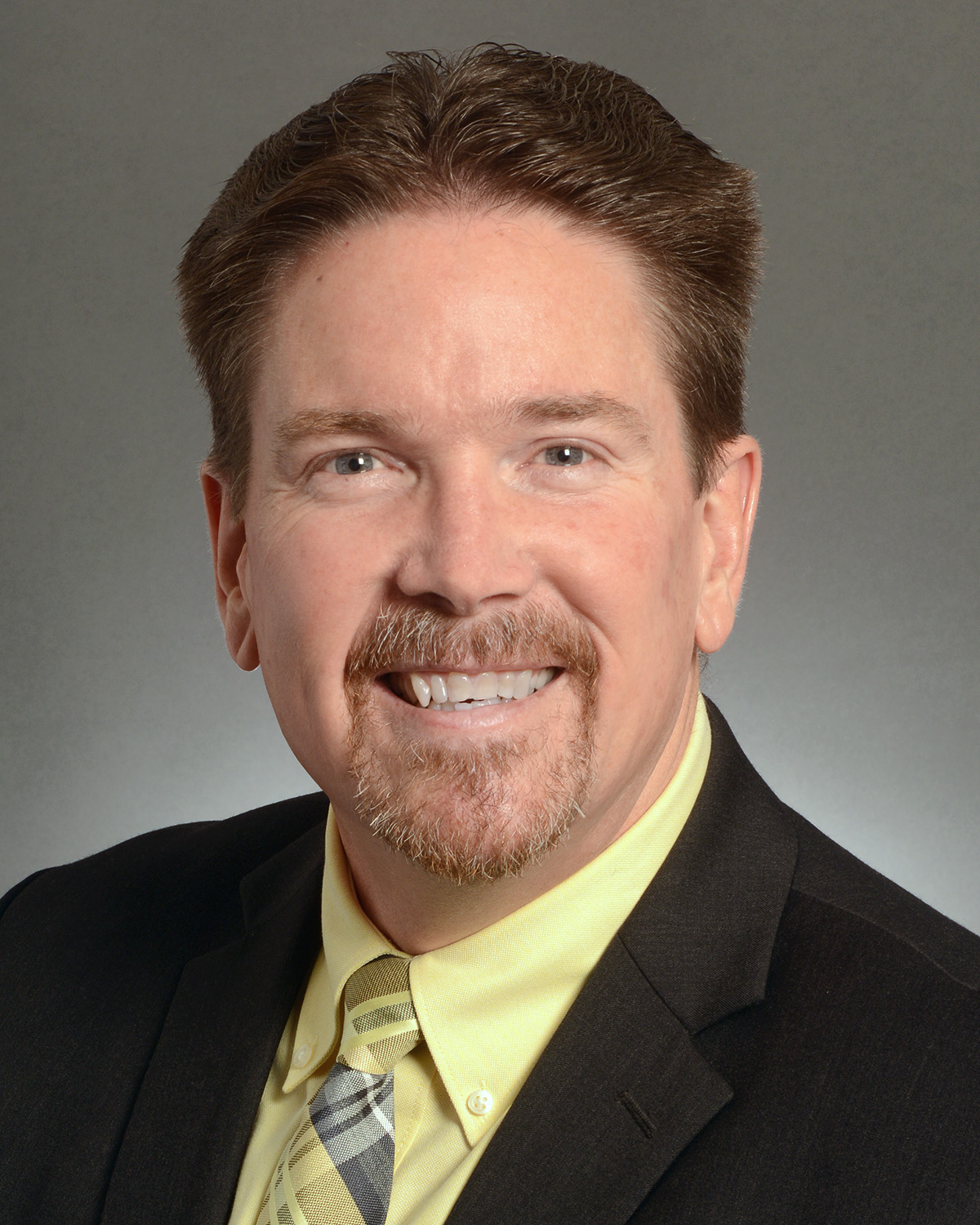

Member of the Minnesota Senate from the 28th (2023 - present), 32nd (2017-2022) district
- Incumbent
- Assumed office January 3, 2017
- Preceded by: Sean Nienow

Personal details
- Born: April 1, 1964 (age 62) Saint Paul, Minnesota, US
- Party: Republican
- Spouse: Cindy
- Children: 3
- Occupation: Sales Manager

Mark W. Koran (/kəˈræn/ kə-RAN; born April 1, 1964) is an American politician and member of the Minnesota Senate. A member of the Republican Party of Minnesota, he represents District 28 in eastern Minnesota.

== Early life, education, and career ==
Koran was born on April 1, 1964, in Saint Paul, Minnesota and raised in Saint Paul's Frogtown neighborhood. He graduated from Como High School in 1982. Koran was previously a manager for the Minnesota Department of Revenue. He is a sales manager and a member of the Lent Township Planning Commission.

== Minnesota Senate ==
Koran was first elected to the Minnesota Senate in 2016, and reelected in 2020 and 2022.

== Personal life ==
Koran and his wife, Cindy, have three children and reside in North Branch.
