= Carl W. Kroening =

American politician and educator (1928–2017)

Member of the Minnesota State Senate
- In office january 6, 1981 – January 7, 1997
- Succeeded by: Linda Higgins

Member of the Minnesota House of Representatives from the 54A district
- In office 1975–1981

Personal details
- Born: April 19, 1928 Minneapolis, Minnesota, U.S.
- Died: June 29, 2017 (aged 89)
- Party: Democratic (DFL)
- Occupation: educator

Carl W. Kroening (April 19, 1928 – June 29, 2017) was an American politician and educator.

Born in Minneapolis, Minnesota, Kroening graduated from John Marshall High School He served in the United States Army during the Korean War and was a master sergeant. Kroening received his bachelor's and master's degrees from the University of Minnesota. Kroening taught chemistry and was a former high school principal. Kroening served in the Minnesota House of Representatives from 1975 to 1981 and was a Democrat; he then served in the Minnesota Senate from 1981 to 1997.
