= John Carlson (Minnesota politician) =

American politician

Member of the Minnesota Senate from the 4th district
- In office January 4, 2011 – January 7, 2013
- Preceded by: Mary Olson
- Succeeded by: Tom Saxhaug

Personal details
- Born: April 1953 (age 73) Akeley, Minnesota, U.S.
- Party: Republican
- Spouse: Ann
- Children: 2
- Education: Institute of Management Accountants; Bemidji State University
- Occupation: Small business owner, insurance agent, adjunct professor

John J. Carlson (born April 1953) is a Minnesota politician and a former member of the Minnesota Senate who represented District 4. A Republican, he is the owner of John Carlson Agency, an insurance service provider. He is also an adjunct professor in the Business Department of Bemidji State University in Bemidji.

Carlson was first elected in 2010. He was a member of the Capital Investment, the Environment and Natural Resources, the Higher Education, and the State Government Innovation and Veterans committees. His special legislative concerns included redesigning of government services, jobs and economy, and education reform. Following redistricting in 2012, Carlson was placed in District 5 alongside Democratic Senator Tom Saxhaug. Saxhaug defeated Carlson on November 6, 2012.

Carlson graduated from Akeley High School in Akeley, then attended Bemidji State University, receiving his B.S. in Business Administration. He later earned his Certified Management Accountant (CMA) designation from the Institute of Management Accountants based in Montvale, New Jersey. He worked for many years as an accountant and later chief financial officer at Northern Medical Imaging in Bemidji before starting his insurance business.
