= Rick Olseen =

American politician

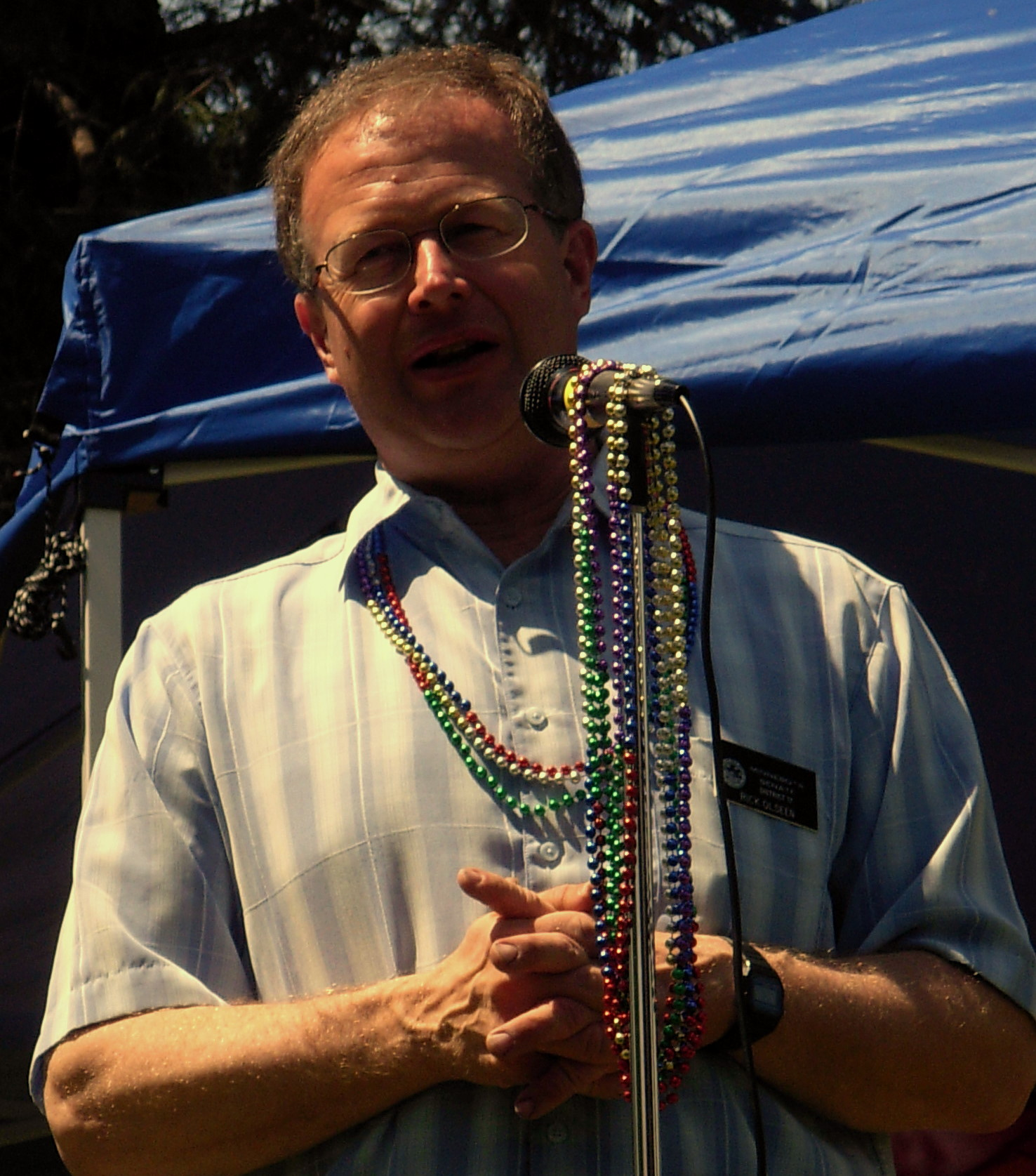

Member of the Minnesota Senate from the 17th district
- In office January 3, 2007 – January 3, 2011
- Preceded by: Sean Nienow
- Succeeded by: Sean Nienow

Personal details
- Born: August 6, 1956 (age 70) Saint Paul, Minnesota
- Party: Minnesota Democratic-Farmer-Labor Party
- Spouse: Bambi
- Children: 2
- Education: District 916 Vocational-Technical College
- Occupation: Truck and trailer repair estimator, legislator

Richard "Rick" Olseen (born August 6, 1956) is a Minnesota politician and a former member of the Minnesota Senate, representing District 17, which includes portions of Anoka, Chisago and Isanti counties in the northeastern part of the Twin Cities metropolitan area. A Democrat, he was first elected to the Senate in 2006. He was unseated by Republican Sean Nienow in the 2010 general election; he had previously unseated Nienow in the 2006 general election.

Olseen was a member of the Senate's Energy, Utilities, Technology and Communications Committee, the State and Local Government Operations and Oversight Committee, and the Transportation Committee. He also served on the Finance subcommittees for the State Government Budget Division (of which he was vice chair) and the Transportation Budget and Policy Division, and on the State and Local Government Operations and Oversight Subcommittee for Elections. His special legislative concerns include transportation, education, health care, and property tax relief.

Olseen is a truck and trailer repair estimator by profession. He attended White Bear Mariner High School in White Bear Lake, then went on to the District 916 Vocational-Technical College (now part of Century College) for auto body repair and painting. He is a former member of the Teamsters and the International Association of Machinists.

Olseen served on the North Branch School Board from 1991 to 2001, then as a Chisago County Commissioner from 2002 to 2006. He is a former member of the North Branch Community Education Advisory Board, former president of the North Branch Parent-Teacher Organization, and former co-chair of the North Branch Parent-to-Parent Communication Network. He is also a former member of the Chisago County Core Committee.
