= Pam Wolf =

American politician (born 1963)

Member of the Minnesota Senate from the 51st district
- In office January 4, 2011 – January 7, 2013
- Preceded by: Don Betzold
- Succeeded by: district redrawn

Personal details
- Born: November 26, 1963 (age 62)
- Party: Republican Party of Minnesota
- Spouse: Brian
- Children: 2
- Education: Bethel College
- Occupation: educator, golf instructor, legislator

Pamela A. Wolf (née Mens; born November 26, 1963) is a Minnesota politician and a former member of the Minnesota Senate who represented District 51, which includes portions of Anoka, Hennepin and Ramsey counties in the northern Twin Cities metropolitan area. A Republican, she is a teacher and a golf instructor.

Wolf was first elected in 2010. She was a member of the Education, the Local Government and Elections, and the Transportation committees. Her special legislative concerns were education, transportation, and taxes. Wolf lost her bid for re-election in 2012 and was defeated by DFLer Alice Johnson.

Wolf graduated from Irondale High School in New Brighton, then went on to Bethel College in Arden Hills, earning her B.A. in 1986. She has taught in elementary, middle school, and high school settings in the Mounds View, Anoka-Hennepin, Spring Lake Park and Columbia Heights school districts, teaching Health, Physical Education, Social Studies, and Special Education. She has also coached middle school, high school, and college level sports. She served on the Minnesota State College and University Trustee Candidate Advisory Council.
