= List of majority leaders of the Minnesota Senate =

Majority Leader of the Minnesota Senate

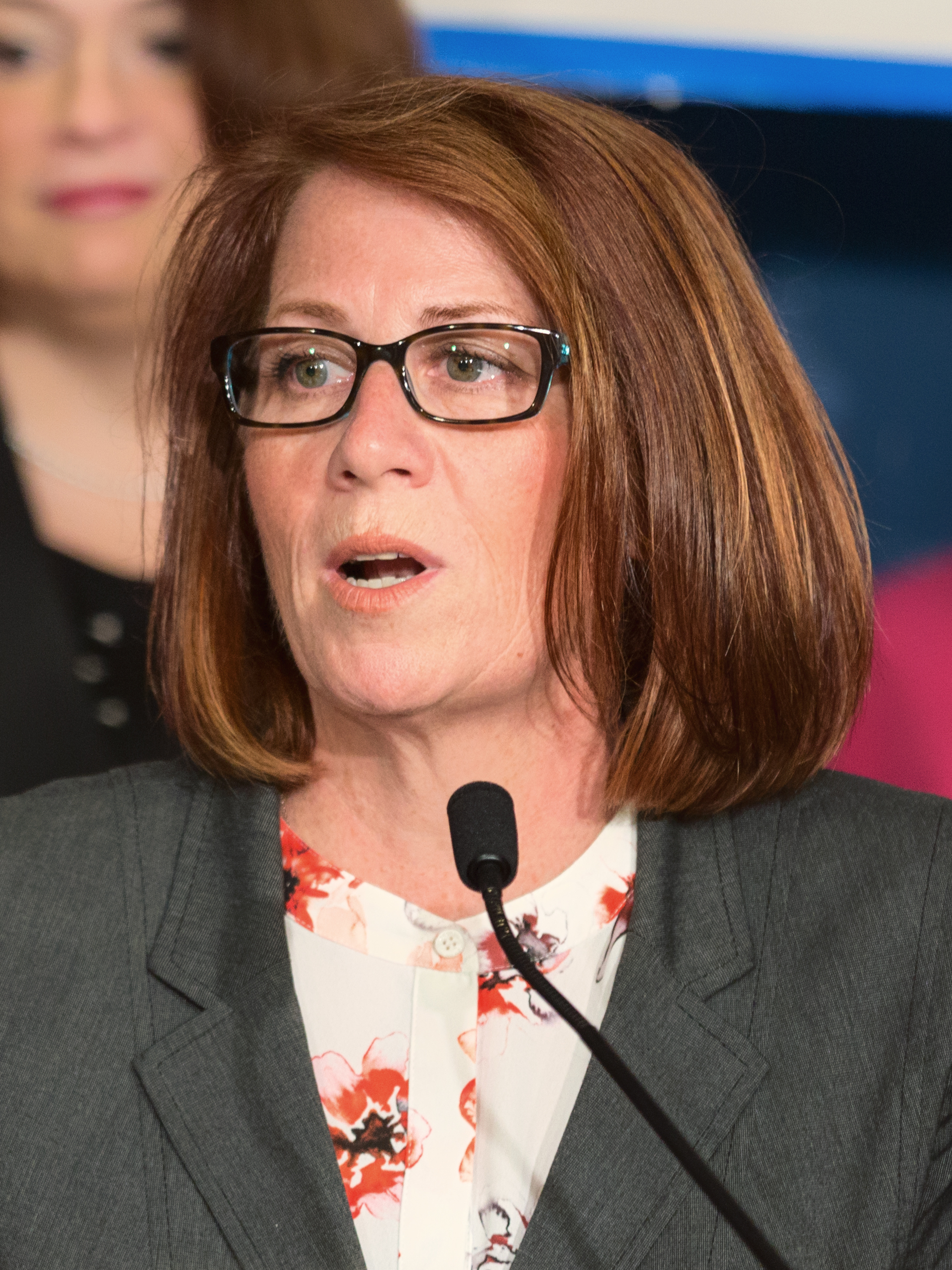
- Incumbent; Erin Murphy since February 6, 2024
- Inaugural holder: Charles N. Orr
- Formation: January 1933

This is a list of majority leaders of the Minnesota Senate. The majority leader is the head of the majority party in the Minnesota Senate, and is the most powerful political figure in the body.

== List ==
No.	Image	Name	Took office	Left office	Party/caucus
1		Charles N. Orr	1933	1949	Conservative
2		Archie H. Miller	1949	1959	Conservative
3		John M. Zwach	1959	1967	Conservative
4		Stanley W. Holmquist	1967	1973	Conservative
5		Nick Coleman	1973	1981	Democratic-Farmer-Labor
6		Roger Moe	1981	2003	Democratic-Farmer-Labor
7		John Hottinger	2003	2004	Democratic-Farmer-Labor
8		Dean Johnson	2004	2007	Democratic-Farmer-Labor
9		Larry Pogemiller	2007	2011	Democratic-Farmer-Labor
10		Amy Koch	2011	2011	Republican
11		Dave Senjem	2011	2013	Republican
12		Tom Bakk	2013	2017	Democratic-Farmer-Labor
13		Paul Gazelka	2017	2021	Republican
14		Mark Johnson (acting)	2021	2021	Republican
15		Jeremy Miller	2021	2023	Republican
16		Kari Dziedzic	2023	2024	Democratic-Farmer-Labor
17		Erin Murphy	2024	incumbent	Democratic-Farmer-Labor

== Notes ==
- Minnesota Democratic-Farmer-Labor Party: On April 15, 1944 the state Democratic Party and the Minnesota Farmer-Labor Party merged and created the Minnesota Democratic-Farmer-Labor Party (DFL). It is affiliated with the national Democratic Party.
- Republican Party of Minnesota: From November 15, 1975 to September 23, 1995 the name of the state Republican party was the Independent-Republican party (I-R). The party has always been affiliated with the national Republican Party.

In 1913, Minnesota legislators began to be elected on nonpartisan ballots. Nonpartisanship also was an historical accident that occurred in the 1913 session when a bill to provide for no party elections of judges and city and county officers was amended to include the Legislature in the belief that it would kill the bill. Legislators ran and caucused as "Liberals" or "Conservatives" roughly equivalent in most years to Democratic-Farmer-Labor and Republican, respectively. The law was changed in 1973, in 1976, Senate members again ran with party designation.
