= Gales Township, Redwood County, Minnesota =

Gales Township, Minnesota
- Township
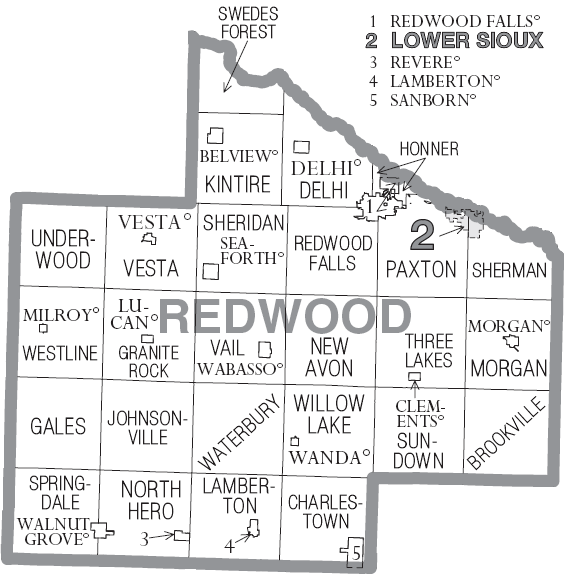
- Cities and townships of Redwood County
- Coordinates: 44°19′55″N 95°31′58″W
- Country: United States
- State: Minnesota
- County: Redwood

Area
  - Total: 36.2 sq mi (93.7 km^{2})
  - Land: 36.1 sq mi (93.4 km^{2})
  - Water: 0.12 sq mi (0.3 km^{2})
- Elevation: 1,152 ft (351 m)

Population (2000)
  - Total: 144
  - Density: 3.9/sq mi (1.5/km^{2})
- Time zone: UTC-6 (Central (CST))
  - Summer (DST): UTC-5 (CDT)
- FIPS code: 27-23048
- GNIS feature ID: 0664241

Gales Township is one of the twenty-six townships of Redwood County, Minnesota, United States. The population was 144 at the 2000 census.

Gales Township was organized in 1876, and named for A. L. and Solon S. Gale, pioneer settlers.

== Geography ==
According to the United States Census Bureau, the township has a total area of 36.2 square miles (94 km^{2}), of which 36.1 square miles (93 km^{2}) is land and 0.1 square miles (0.26 km^{2}) (0.36%) is water.

No municipalities are located in Gales Township.

== Demographics ==
As of the census of 2000, there were 144 people, 50 households, and 43 families residing in the township. The population density was 4.0 inhabitants per square mile (1.5/km^{2}). There were 62 housing units at an average density of 1.7 per square mile (0.66/km^{2}). The racial makeup of the township was 100.00% White.

There were 50 households, out of which 34.0% had children under the age of 18 living with them, 78.0% were married couples living together, 4.0% had a female householder with no husband present, and 14.0% were non-families. 14.0% of all households were made up of individuals, and 2.0% had someone living alone who was 65 years of age or older. The average household size was 2.88 and the average family size was 3.16.

In the township the population was spread out, with 27.1% under the age of 18, 9.7% from 18 to 24, 29.9% from 25 to 44, 20.8% from 45 to 64, and 12.5% who were 65 years of age or older. The median age was 33 years. For every 100 females, there were 97.3 males. For every 100 females age 18 and over, there were 105.9 males.

The median income for a household in the township was $47,500, and the median income for a family was $47,500. Males had a median income of $31,563 versus $20,833 for females. The per capita income for the township was $16,554. There were 10.4% of families and 14.6% of the population living below the poverty line, including 24.6% of under eighteens and none of those over 64.
