= Sean Nienow =

American politician

Member of the Minnesota Senate
- In office January 4, 2011 – January 2, 2017
- Preceded by: Rick Olseen
- Succeeded by: Mark Koran
- Constituency: 17th district (2011–13); 32nd district (2013–17)
- In office January 7, 2003 – January 2, 2007
- Preceded by: Twyla Ring (District 18)
- Succeeded by: Rick Olseen
- Constituency: 17th district

Personal details
- Born: March 9, 1968 (age 58) Anoka, Minnesota
- Party: Republican Party of Minnesota
- Spouse: Cynthia (m. 1989)
- Children: 8
- Education: Northwestern College
- Occupation: consultant

Sean Robert Nienow (born March 9, 1968) is a Minnesota politician and former member of the Minnesota Senate. A member of the Republican Party of Minnesota, he represented District 32, which included all or portions of Anoka and Isanti counties in the northeastern part of the Twin Cities metropolitan area.

== Early life, education, and career ==
Nienow grew up in Stacy, graduated from Chadashchay High School, then went on to Northwestern College in Roseville, where he majored in Business and Psychology. He also served as a major in the United States Air Force Auxiliary Civil Air Patrol. Prior to his first term in the Senate, he worked for American Express Financial Advisers for 14 years. He currently works as a process consultant and adviser.

== Minnesota Senate ==
Nienow previously served in the Senate from 2003 to 2007 before being unseated by DFLer Rick Olseen in the 2006 general election. He successfully challenged Olseen for his old seat in the 2010 general election, garnering 56.01% of the vote to Olseen's 43.83%. Nienow was re-elected to District 32 in 2012.

During his previous term in the Senate, he served on the Agriculture, Veterans and Gaming, the Environment and Natural Resources, the Finance, and the Health and Family Security committees, and on the Environment and Natural Resources Subcommittee for Game and Fish, the Finance Subcommittee for the Early Childhood Policy and Budget Division, and the Finance Subcommittee for the K-12 Education Budget Division. His special legislative concerns include education, jobs, health care, and transportation.

Nienow lost the primary election for the Republican nomination for re-election in 2016, losing to Mark Koran.
