= Tom Saxhaug =

American politician

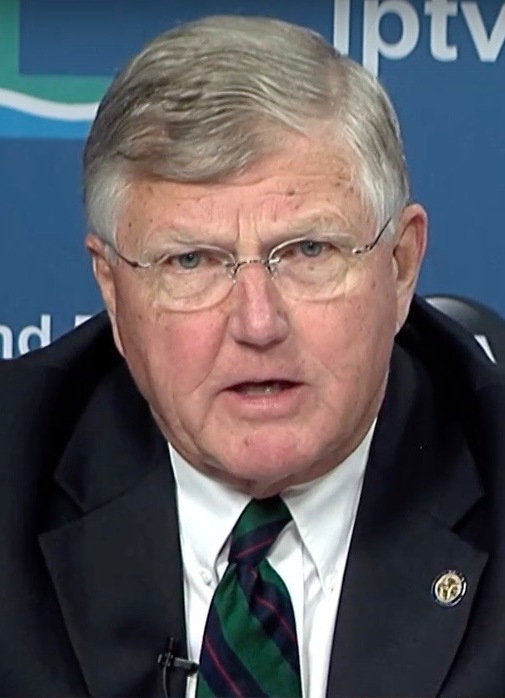

Member of the Minnesota Senate from the 5th district 3rd (2003–2013)
- In office January 7, 2003 – January 2, 2017
- Preceded by: Bob Lessard
- Succeeded by: Justin Eichorn

Personal details
- Born: February 22, 1948 (age 78) Grand Rapids, Minnesota, U.S.
- Party: Minnesota Democratic–Farmer–Labor Party
- Spouse: Nancy
- Children: 2
- Education: St. Olaf College

Tom Saxhaug (born February 22, 1948) is an American politician and former member of the Minnesota Senate. A member of the Minnesota Democratic–Farmer–Labor Party (DFL), he represented District 5, which included portions of Beltrami, Cass, Hubbard, and Itasca counties in the northern part of the state.

== Early life, education, and career ==
Saxhaug completed his secondary education at Grand Rapids High School in Grand Rapids and later received a B.A. from St. Olaf College in Northfield. Prior to his election to the Senate, he served on the Grand Rapids City Council from 1995 to 1997, and was an Itasca County Commissioner from 1997 to 2003. He is a retired insurance agent.

== Minnesota Senate ==
Saxhaug was first elected in 2002, and was re-elected in 2006, 2010, and 2012. Following redistricting in 2012, Saxhaug was placed in District 5 alongside Republican Senator John Carlson. Saxhaug defeated Carlson on November 6, 2012. He lost re-election to Republican Justin Eichorn in 2016.

== Electoral history ==
Minnesota Senate 5th district election, 2012
Party	Candidate	Votes	%	±%
Democratic (DFL)	Tom Saxhaug	21,301	52.33	
Republican	John Carlson	19,362	47.56	

Minnesota Senate 3rd district election, 2010
Party	Candidate	Votes	%	±%
Democratic (DFL)	Tom Saxhaug	18,269	57.76	−7.29pp
Republican	Dan McGuire	13,320	42.11	+7.32pp

Minnesota Senate 3rd district election, 2006
Party	Candidate	Votes	%	±%
Democratic (DFL)	Tom Saxhaug	21,226	65.05	+5.06pp
Republican	Ted Lovdahl	11,351	34.79	−5.10pp

Minnesota Senate 3rd district election, 2002
Party	Candidate	Votes	%	±%
Democratic (DFL)	Tom Saxhaug	19,917	59.99	
Republican	J. Mark Wedel	13,242	39.89	

== Personal life ==
Saxhaug and his wife, Nancy, have two children. Son Tim is a member of Bluegrass band Trampled by Turtles.
