= Ted Daley =

American politician

Member of the Minnesota Senate from the 38th district
- In office January 4, 2011 – January 7, 2013
- Preceded by: Jim Carlson
- Succeeded by: district redrawn

Personal details
- Born: Theodore Joseph Daley; March 15, 1966 (age 60)
- Party: Republican Party of Minnesota
- Spouse: Dawn
- Children: 4
- Education: United States Military Academy; University of St. Thomas
- Occupation: Certified public accountant, U.S. Army Reserve, legislator

Theodore J. "Ted" Daley (born March 15, 1966) is a Minnesota politician and a former member of the Minnesota Senate who represented District 38, which included most of Eagan and a small portion of Burnsville in Dakota County, which is in the southeastern Twin Cities metropolitan area. A Republican, he is a certified public accountant and a member of the United States Army Reserve.

Daley was first elected in 2010. He lost reelection in 2012 to Jim Carlson. He was a member of the Education, the Jobs and Economic Growth, and the State Government Innovation and Veterans committees. His special legislative concerns were education reform, an improved business climate, less government spending, and veterans affairs.

Daley graduated from Preston-Fountain High School in southeastern Minnesota, then went on to the United States Military Academy at West Point, New York, graduating in 1988 with a double language major in Russian and German and a minor in Engineering. He was assigned to Korea, then to the 101st Airborne Division, serving in Operation Desert Shield and Operation Desert Storm in 1990-1991 during the Gulf War. In 1996, after leaving active duty and joining the U.S. Army Reserve, he earned his M.B.A. from the University of St. Thomas in Saint Paul.

Daley returned to active military duty in 2001, serving until 2009. During this time, he was deployed to Israel, serving in the Strategic Liaison Cell, to Cuba, serving as the U.S. European Command Liaison Officer, and to Iraq, serving as Senior Economics Advisor on the Provincial Reconstruction Team. When not actively deployed, he worked at Fort Snelling as the Chief of Joint Operations, an active duty military leadership position with U.S. Navy, U.S. Army, U.S. Air Force and U.S. National Guard members.

Active in his community, Daley served on the Eagan Planning Commission from 2009 to 2010, is Cubmaster for Boy Scouts Pack 446, and an active lector at his church. He has also coached soccer, basketball and track for the Eagan Athletic Association.
