= Benjamin Kruse (politician) =

American politician

Member of the Minnesota Senate from the 47th district
- In office January 4, 2011 – January 8, 2013
- Preceded by: Leo Foley
- Succeeded by: district redrawn

Personal details
- Born: April 18, 1978 (age 48) Green Bay, Wisconsin, U.S.
- Party: Republican
- Spouse: Anita
- Education: University of Minnesota
- Occupation: Real-estate agent, legislator

Benjamin Allen Kruse (born April 18, 1978) is an American politician and a former member of the Minnesota Senate who represented District 47, which included portions of Anoka and Hennepin counties in the northern Twin Cities metropolitan area. A Republican, he is a real estate agent with Coldwell Banker Burnet, based in Minnesota.

Kruse was first elected in 2010. He was a member of the Commerce and Consumer Protection, the Education, the Local Government and Elections, and the Transportation committees. His special legislative concerns were commerce, education, taxes, and public safety. Kruse was defeated in his 2012 bid for re-election, losing to John Hoffman.

Kruse was born and raised in Green Bay, Wisconsin, and moved to Minnesota to attend the University of Minnesota in Minneapolis. He eventually left college to work as a restaurant manager, and later became a real estate agent. He also worked for a time as a legislative assistant to State Representative Bob Gunther, who represented District 24A in the southern part of the state.

Active in his local business community, Kruse is a founding member of the North Hennepin Area Chamber of Commerce Government Relations Committee, and has been a member of the Minnesota Association of Realtors Government Affairs Committee, the Minneapolis Area Association of Realtors Public Affairs Task Force and Government Affairs Committee, the North Hennepin Area Chamber of Commerce, and the Coldwell Banker Burnet Presidents Advisory Council.
