= Minnesota Office of Higher Education =

Department overview
- Formed: 1965
- Jurisdiction: Minnesota
- Headquarters: 1450 Energy Park Dr, Saint Paul, Minnesota
- Department executive: Dennis Olson, Commissioner
- Website: www.ohe.state.mn.us

The Minnesota Office of Higher Education is an executive branch agency that is responsible for the coordination of higher education information, financial aid programs, statistics, and policy in the U.S. state of Minnesota. The agency does not run or administer the two public systems of higher education in Minnesota, the Minnesota State Colleges and Universities system or the University of Minnesota system.

== Functions ==
In contrast to many other states, the Minnesota Office of Higher Education primarily functions as a policy and coordination role between the state's public, private non-profit and for-profit colleges and universities. It is the designated state higher education executive office or SHEEO organization. The agency also participates with the National Council for State Authorization Reciprocity or NC-SARA.

It also administers financial aid on behalf of the state with respect to state and federal student loans and aid. It also provides general counseling on student loans and finances to the public. Annually it administers up to $150 million of state grants and the state loan program called SELF to students attending schools in Minnesota.

The agency also provides research on higher education spending for the state legislature and advises the Minnesota Department of Veterans Affairs on the administration of the state and federal G.I. Bill. In addition to these functions it also licenses higher education programs in Minnesota.

== Initiatives ==
The agency has set a statewide policy goal of increasing the percent of Minnesota citizens to that have attained a collegiate certificate or degree to 70 percent by 2025. It is also working to research ways of reducing structural barriers and achievement gaps for students of color, persons of low income, persons with disabilities and other groups. In 2013, the state legislature passed the Minnesota Dream Act which allowed for undocumented students to be eligible for in-state tuition. The agency administers the funding and determines eligibility for the dream act and for Deferred Action for Childhood Arrival students.

== See also ==
- Minnesota State Colleges and Universities system
- University of Minnesota system
- Colleges and universities in Minnesota
