= Jim Carlson (Minnesota politician) =

American politician

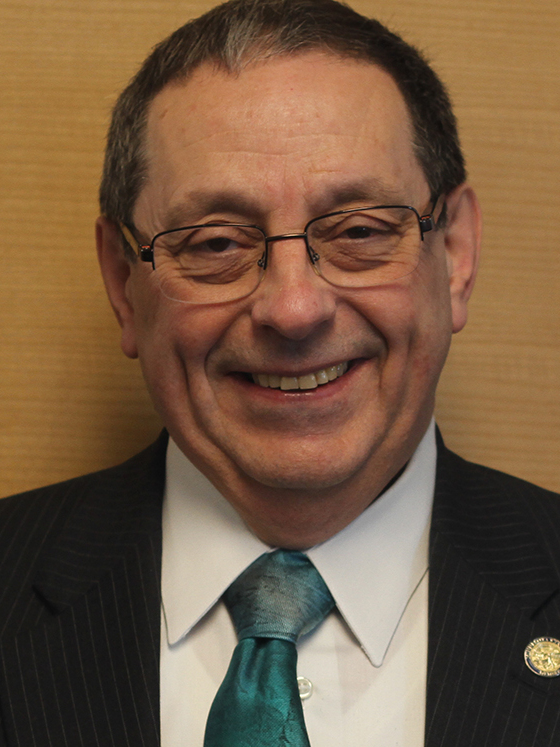

Member of the Minnesota Senate from the 52nd district
- Incumbent
- Assumed office January 8, 2013
- Preceded by: Ted Daley

Member of the Minnesota Senate from the 38th district
- In office January 3, 2007 – January 3, 2011
- Preceded by: Michael McGinn
- Succeeded by: Ted Daley

Personal details
- Born: February 17, 1947 (age 79) Saint Paul, Minnesota
- Party: Democratic (DFL)
- Spouse: Gayle
- Children: 2
- Education: Dunwoody Institute; University of Minnesota
- Occupation: Legislator

Jim Carlson (born February 17, 1947) is a Minnesota politician and member of the Minnesota Senate. A member of the Minnesota Democratic–Farmer–Labor Party (DFL), he represents District 52, which includes all but one precinct of Eagan and Mendota Heights, all of Mendota, and some of Burnsville in Dakota County in the southeastern Twin Cities metropolitan area.

== Minnesota Senate ==
Carlson was first elected in 2006. He was unseated by Republican Ted Daley in 2010, but ran again and was elected in 2012. Carlson was reelected in 2016, 2020, and 2022.

== Personal life ==
Carlson is Lutheran.
