= Dan Hall (politician) =

American politician

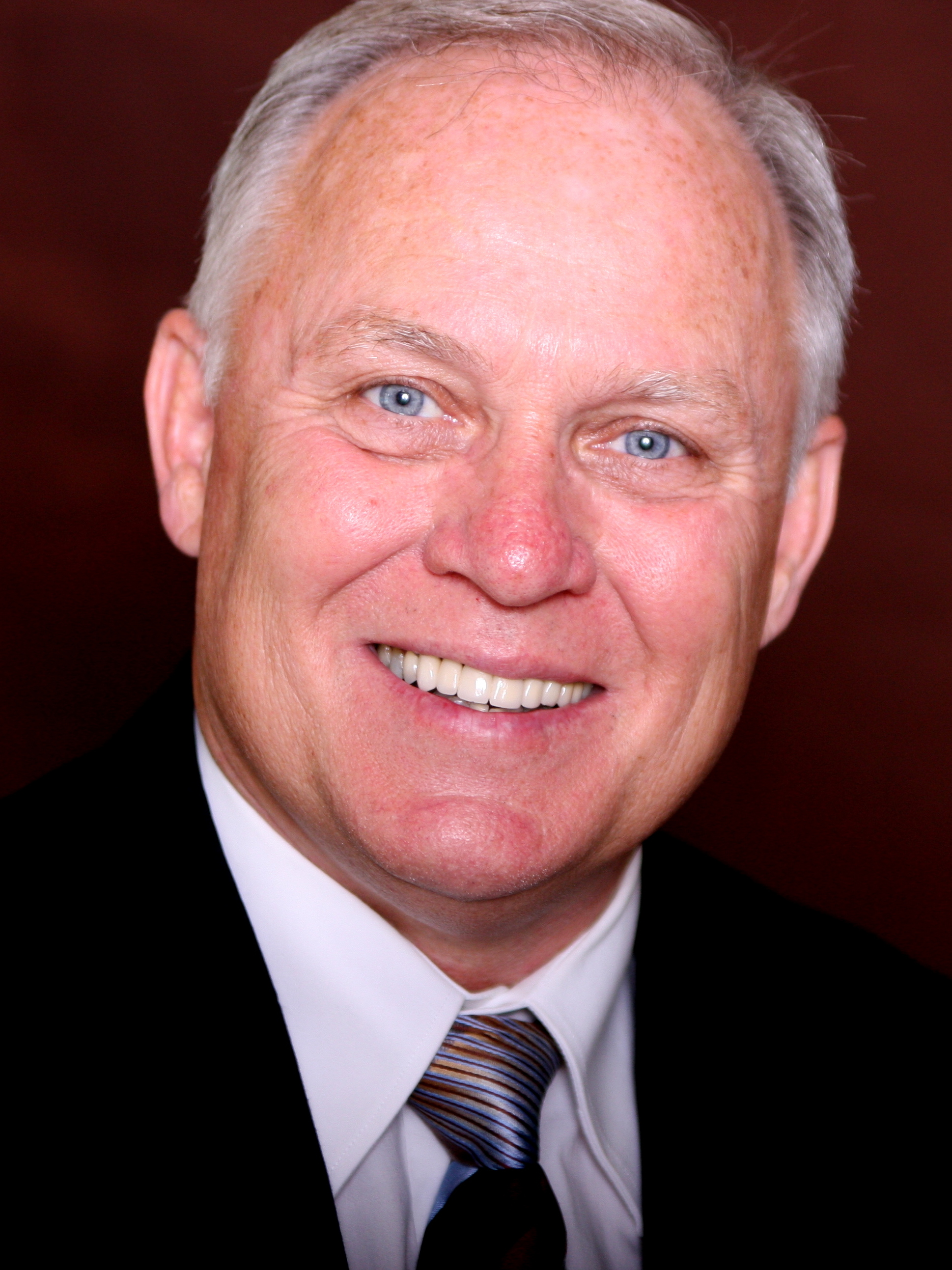

Member of the Minnesota Senate from the 56th district 40th (2011–2013)
- In office January 4, 2011 – January 5, 2021
- Preceded by: John P. Doll
- Succeeded by: Lindsey Port

Personal details
- Born: April 16, 1952 (age 74) Minneapolis, Minnesota
- Party: Republican Party of Minnesota
- Spouse: Valerie (m. 1974)
- Children: 8
- Education: Augsburg College
- Occupation: business relationship management, legislator

Dan D. Hall (born April 16, 1952) is a Minnesota politician and former member of the Minnesota Senate. A member of the Republican Party of Minnesota, he represented District 56, which includes portions of the cities of Burnsville, Savage and Lakeville in Dakota and Scott counties in the southern Twin Cities metropolitan area.

== Early life, education, and career ==
Hall was born and raised in Minneapolis. He graduated from Roosevelt High School in Minneapolis, then went on to Augsburg College, also in Minneapolis, where he majored in health and physical education, and where he was a hockey All-American.

He is vice president of Business Relations with JUX Law Firm and the former CEO of Midwest Chaplains, a former director of the Minneapolis YMCA, and a former Christian school principal.

== Minnesota Senate ==
Hall was first elected in 2010 and reelected in 2012. His special legislative concerns included jobs, taxes, the budget, and education.

In 2014, Hall opposed the Women's Economic Security Act, legislation requiring contractors to pay women equally, saying, "I will not stand here and vote for a bill that promotes one gender over another."

== Personal life ==
Hall is a volunteer chaplain for the Burnsville Police and Fire departments, a youth hockey, soccer, volleyball and softball coach, an Open Arms food shelf volunteer coordinator, a youth hockey camp volunteer, and a YMCA Youth in Government volunteer advisor. He was also a chaplain at the Minnesota State Capitol and a volunteer chaplain after the I-35W bridge collapse.

== Criticism ==
Hall said he attracted significant criticism for opposing the legalization of gay marriage in Minnesota: "I can't tell you how many letters I've gotten that said, 'you're a bigot,' or tweets 'you're a bigot because you disagree. Really? Really? I'm trying to be a nice guy but I have a different opinion. So now you're labeling me, name-calling me."

=== Comments on education ===
In April 2011, Hall criticized government-mandated integration and segregation, saying: "I watched Minneapolis get destroyed, so I not only didn’t want my kids in the school system. I took them out of Minneapolis because they ruined our neighborhoods with integration and segregation." Hall said his statements were made in an effort to reduce schools' emphasis on race and increase their emphasis on literacy for students of all backgrounds. "I am a product of the Minneapolis school system ... completing all of my years, all the different schools. I graduated with a 6th grade reading ability. I struggled my whole life. We need to teach kids how to read".
