= Leo Foley =

American politician

Member of the Minnesota Senate from the 47th district
- In office January 7, 1997 – January 4, 2011
- Preceded by: Eugene R. Merriam
- Succeeded by: Benjamin Kruse

Personal details
- Born: October 25, 1928 Coon Rapids, Minnesota, U.S.
- Died: February 5, 2016 (aged 87) Coon Rapids, Minnesota, U.S.
- Party: Minnesota Democratic-Farmer-Labor Party
- Spouse: Kathryn
- Children: 4
- Education: University of Minnesota; Metropolitan State University; Northwestern University; Minnesota State University, Mankato; William Mitchell College of Law
- Occupation: Attorney, peace officer, legislator, veteran

Leo T. Foley (October 25, 1928 – February 5, 2016) was an American politician who was a member of the Minnesota Senate representing District 49 from 1997 to 2003, and District 47 from 2003 to 2011, which includes portions of Anoka and Hennepin counties in the northern Twin Cities metropolitan area. A Democrat, he was first elected to the Senate in 1996, and was re-elected in 2000, 2002 and 2006. Prior to the 2002 legislative redistricting, the area was known as District 49. He was unseated by Republican Benjamin Kruse in the 2010 general election.

== Senate leadership ==
Foley was a member of the Senate's Capital Investment Committee, the Finance Committee, and the Judiciary Committee. He also served on the Finance subcommittees for the Judiciary Budget Division (which he chaired), and for the Public Safety Budget Division. His special legislative concerns included education, health care, crime prevention, the environment, transportation, and social services.

== Professional career and education ==
Foley worked as a laborer for the Great Northern Railway from 1946 to 1947, then joined the United States Navy from 1947 to 1952, serving in the Korean War. He was a security officer at the Twin City Arsenal from 1952 to 1954, then became a member of the Minnesota State Patrol from 1954 to 1987. He attended the University of Minnesota and Metropolitan State University, earning his B.A. in public administration in 1974. He later attended Northwestern University and Minnesota State University, Mankato, earning a M.A. in public administration in 1979.

After retiring from the Minnesota State Patrol as a major in 1987, Foley worked as security manager for Unisys Corporation from 1987 to 1990. He was a deputy sheriff with the Anoka County Sheriff's Department from 1990 to 1992, then worked as a law clerk with the Anoka County Attorney's Office while earning his J.D. degree from William Mitchell College of Law in Saint Paul, which he received in 1994. From 1994 onwards he was an assistant county attorney for Anoka County.

== Community service ==
Foley was active on government and community-based boards through the years. He chaired and was a member of the City of Anoka's Planning Commission from 1977 to 1997. He chaired and was a member of the Anoka Human Rights Commission from 1970 to 1996. He served as president of the Ramsey County Chiefs of Police organization, and was a member of the Minnesota State Advisory Council on Mental Health. He was a member of the American Bar Association and the Minnesota State Bar Association.

== Death ==
Foley died on February 5, 2016, in Coon Rapids, Minnesota.
