= Linda Higgins =

American politician (born 1950)

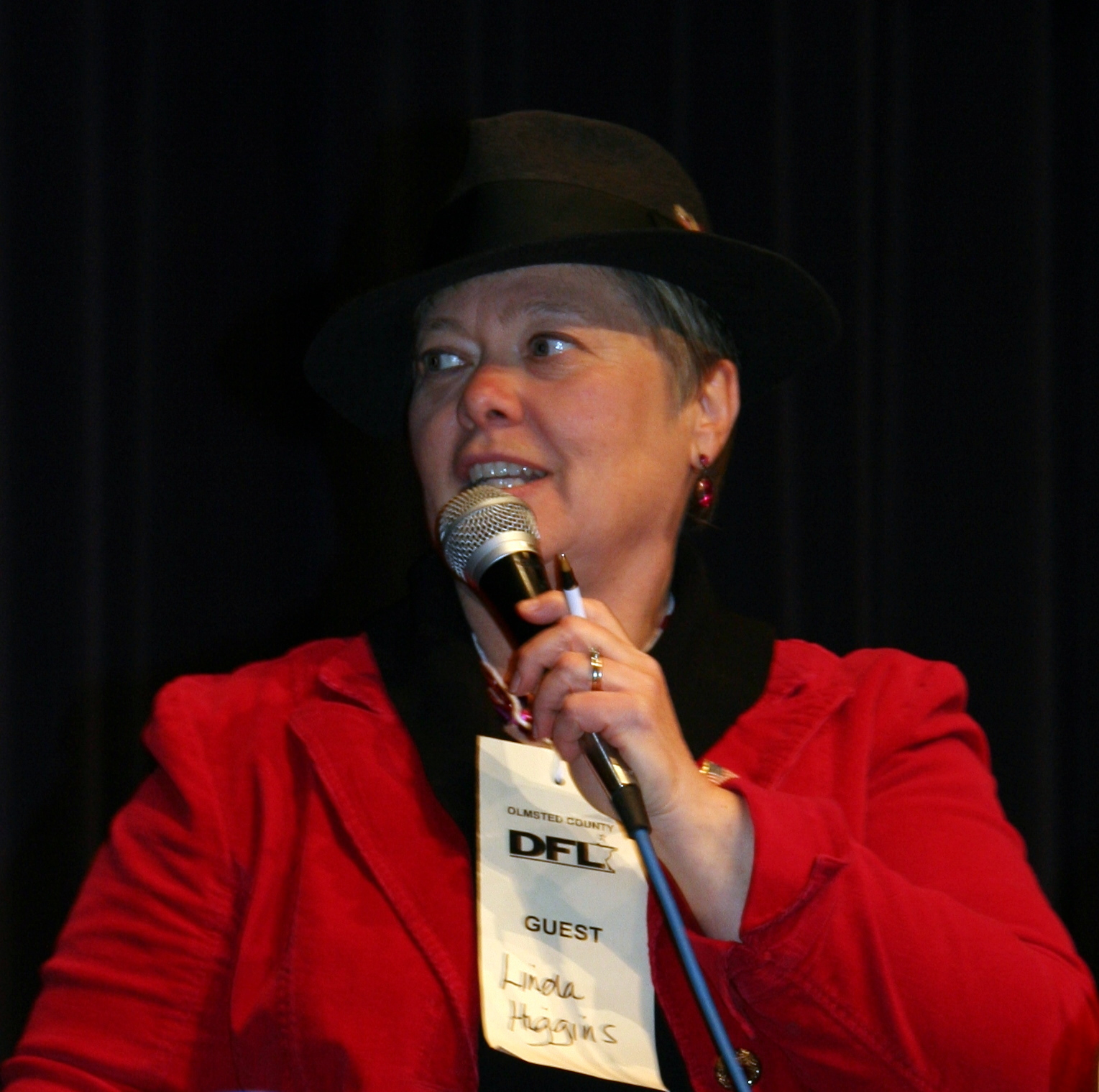

Member of the Minnesota Senate from the 58th district
- In office January 7, 1997 – January 7, 2013
- Preceded by: Carl Kroening
- Succeeded by: Bobby Joe Champion

Personal details
- Born: November 11, 1950 (age 75) Algona, Iowa
- Party: Minnesota Democratic-Farmer-Labor Party
- Spouse: Brian Bushay
- Education: Iowa Lakes Community College; Minnesota State University, Mankato
- Occupation: legislator, writer

Linda Higgins (born November 11, 1950) is a Minnesota politician who represented the second district of Hennepin County as county commissioner from late 2012 to January 2019. Higgins is a former member of the Minnesota Senate representing District 58, which included portions of the city of Minneapolis in Hennepin County, which is in the Twin Cities metropolitan area. A Democrat, she was first elected to the Senate in 1996, and was re-elected in 2000, 2002, 2006 and 2010. She served as a majority whip from 2001 to 2006. In the fall of 2011, she announced that she would not seek reelection after the current term ended in 2012. However, when Hennepin County District 2 commissioner Mark Stenglein announced in June 2012 that he would resign, Higgins decided to run for that position. On May 20, 2012, she was endorsed by the DFL party for the position, and won the election in November. In 2014, she ran unopposed and was reelected. She served as the vice-chair of the county board, and chair of the Housing and Redevelopment Authority. She retired from the county board in January 2019.

Higgins was a member of the Senate's Capital Investment, Environment and Natural Resources, and Health and Human Services committees. She chaired the Senate State and Local Government Operations Committee from 2003 to 2007. She also chaired the Public Safety Budget Division from 2008 to 2010. Her special legislative concerns included housing, early childhood issues, health, communities of color, and the environment.

Higgins is a writer, having worked as an editor for "The Physician and Sportsmedicine" medical journal for McGraw-Hill Healthcare Publications, and was also an assistant to Minneapolis City Council member Joe Biernat. She attended Titonka High School in Titonka, Iowa, then went on to Iowa Lakes Community College, where she received her A.A. degree, and to Mankato State College in Mankato, where she received her BS degree in Teaching.

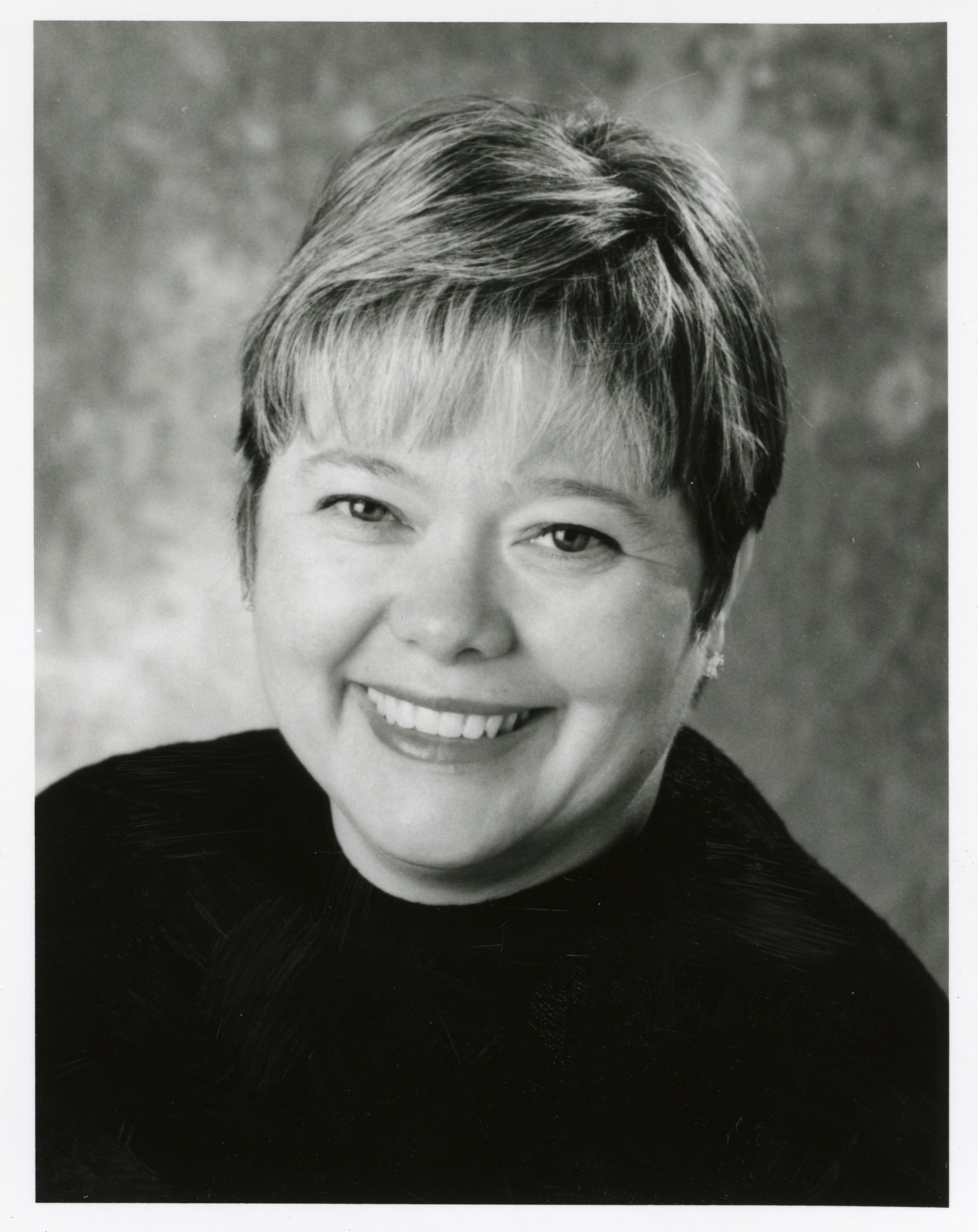
Senator Linda I. Higgins, Minnesota Legislature, 1997-1998 Legislative Session.

Higgins has served on the boards of the Cedar-Riverside People's Center, the Council on Black Minnesotans, the Greater Lake Country Food Bank, and the Minneapolis Institute of Arts. She is also a member of the Saint Anthony Falls Heritage Board. She served on the executive committee of the Council of State Governments. She is a former member of the Minneapolis City Charter Commission.

While on the county board, she was active in the National Association of Counties, serving on several policy committees, chairing health and human services subcommittees, and being active on the board of the Large Urban County Caucus.

In November 2017, Higgins announced that she would retire as county commissioner when her term ends in January 2019.
