= Amy Koch =

American politician

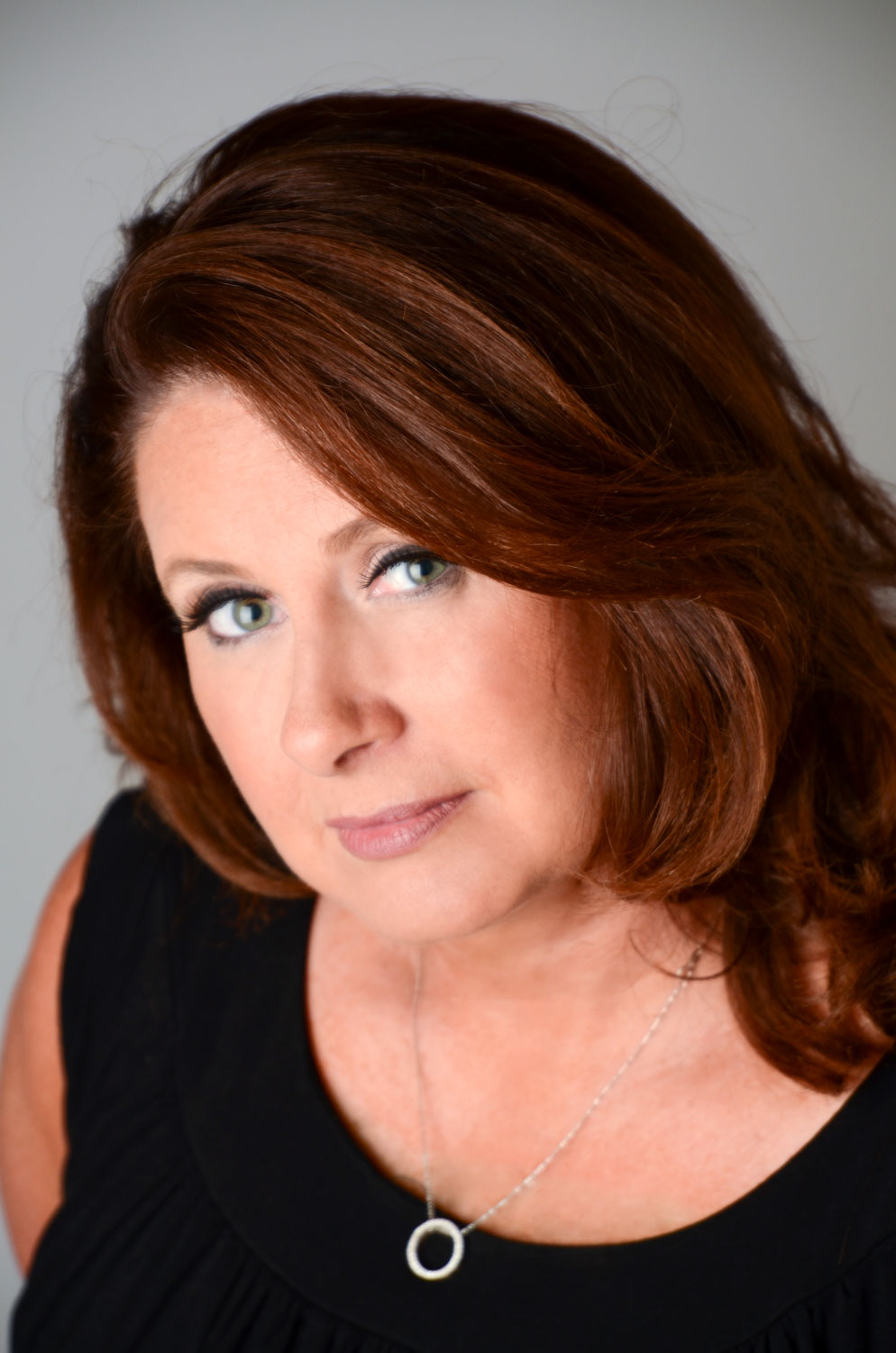
- Koch in 2015

Majority Leader of the Minnesota Senate
- In office January 4, 2011 – December 15, 2011
- Preceded by: Larry Pogemiller
- Succeeded by: David Senjem

Member of the Minnesota Senate from the 19th district
- In office January 5, 2006 – January 7, 2013
- Preceded by: Mark Ourada
- Succeeded by: Kathleen Sheran

Personal details
- Born: October 8, 1971 (age 54) Buffalo, Minnesota, U.S.
- Party: Republican
- Spouse: Clint Fredericksen
- Children: 2
- Education: Concordia College; Defense Language Institute; St. Cloud State University
- Occupation: business owner, legislator, veteran
- Awards: Joint Service Achievement Medal

Military service
- Branch/service: United States Air Force
- Years of service: 1992-1996
- Rank: Senior Airman
- Unit: National Security Agency

Amy T. Koch (born October 8, 1971) is an American politician and a former majority leader of the Minnesota Senate, where she represented portions of Hennepin and Wright counties. Koch, the first female Senate majority leader in state history, is also a regular commentator for Minnesota local media.

== Early life, education, and career ==
Koch grew up in Buffalo, Minnesota, graduating from Buffalo High School in 1990. After briefly attending Concordia College in Moorhead, Minnesota, Koch joined the United States Air Force in 1992. While serving in the military, Koch met her former husband, Christopher, and gave birth to her daughter, Rachel.

Koch studied Russian at the Defense Language Institute in California, before being assigned to the National Security Agency in Fort Meade, Maryland. She graduated with honors at all stages of her military training and received the Joint Service Commendation Medal for her contribution to the intelligence community.

After receiving an honorable discharge from the Air Force in 1996, Koch returned to Buffalo, Minnesota and attended St. Cloud State University, where she earned a bachelor's degree in 1999.

Koch has volunteered as an adult leader for 4-H and served as vice chair of the St. Francis Xavier Parish Council as well as liaison to the Education Advisory Board.

In 2016, Koch began working as a political strategist for Hylden Advocacy & Law in Minneapolis.

Koch is a part owner of HBK Properties LLC in Buffalo. In 2013, Koch bought Maple Lake Bowl, a bowling alley just north of her home in Buffalo, MN. Koch owned and operated the bowling alley until she sold it in the summer of 2016.

== Political career ==
After leaving the military and returning to Minnesota, Koch became active in local Republican politics. In addition to serving on her local party unit board, Koch actively volunteered for former Congressman Mark Kennedy and former Secretary of State Mary Kiffmeyer.

Koch was first elected to the Minnesota Senate in a 2005 special election, replacing Mark Ourada, who resigned months earlier. She was re-elected in 2006 and 2010. Koch, a former assistant minority leader, was the first woman to serve as majority leader of the Minnesota Senate, and the first Republican to do so since party affiliation.

=== Relationship with staffer ===
On December 15, 2011, in a surprise announcement, Koch said she would resign from her post as majority leader of the Minnesota Senate. Republican state senators indicated Koch had an "inappropriate" relationship with a staffer, whose identity would later be confirmed as former state Senate aide Michael Brodkorb. Koch later apologized and did not seek re-election to another term in the Minnesota Senate.

Minnesota Senate
| Preceded by Lawrence Pogemiller | Minnesota Senate Majority Leader; 2011 | Succeeded by David Senjem |
| Preceded by Mark Ourada | Member of the Minnesota Senate for the 19th District; 2006 – 2013 | Succeeded by Kathleen Sheran |
