= Carla Nelson =

American politician

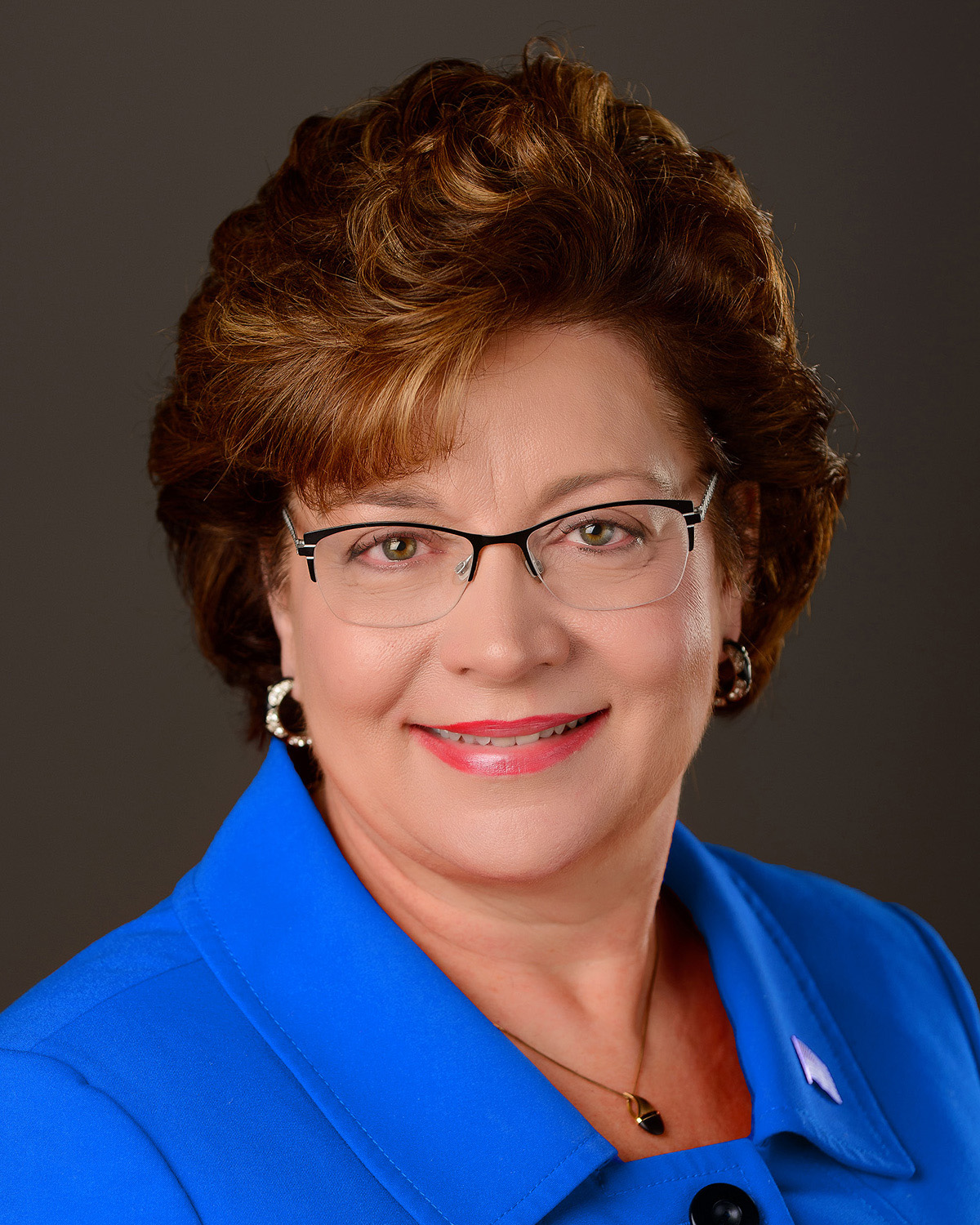

Member of the Minnesota Senate from the 24th district 26th (2013-2023) 30th (2011–2013)
- Incumbent
- Assumed office January 4, 2011
- Preceded by: Ann Lynch
- Succeeded by: Simon Glaser (elect)

Chair of the Minnesota Senate Committee on Taxes
- In office January 5, 2021 – January 3, 2023
- Preceded by: Roger Chamberlain
- Succeeded by: Ann Rest

Member of the Minnesota House of Representatives from the 30A district
- In office January 7, 2003 – January 3, 2005
- Preceded by: redrawn district
- Succeeded by: Tina Liebling

Personal details
- Born: May 22, 1957 (age 69) Webster City, Iowa
- Party: Republican
- Spouse: Terry Nelson
- Children: 3
- Education: Drake University; University of Minnesota
- Occupation: teacher, small business owner, legislator

Carla J. Nelson (born May 22, 1957) is an American politician from Minnesota who is a member of the Minnesota Senate. A member of the Republican Party of Minnesota, she represents District 24, which includes parts of Olmsted County and Dodge County in the southeastern part of the state. Much of the southern half of Rochester and parts of northwestern Rochester are in her district.

In 2018, Nelson was an unsuccessful candidate in the Republican primary to represent Minnesota's 1st congressional district.

== Early life, education, and career ==
Nelson graduated from Drake University in Des Moines, Iowa, receiving her B.S. in special education. She then attended the University of Minnesota in Minneapolis, earning her M.Ed. in teacher leadership and her reading specialist certification.

Nelson is the owner of the Olmsted Group, an insurance and investment firm in Rochester. She was previously an elementary and middle school teacher in Rochester.

== Minnesota Legislature ==
Nelson was first elected to the Senate in 2010 and was reelected in 2012, 2016, 2020, and 2022. She served in the Minnesota House of Representatives from 2003 to 2005, and was a member of the House's Education Policy, Higher Education Finance, and Local Government and Metropolitan Affairs committees. Her special legislative concerns include health care, commerce, higher education, and taxes. Nelson was named an assistant minority leader in November 2012.

Nelson was named a 2021 Legislator of Distinction by the Minnesota League of Cities, a nonpartisan association of local governments. She was one of only seven state senators to receive the recognition that year.

== State boards ==
Nelson was an appointed member of the Minnesota Higher Education Finance Authority Board from 2005 to 2009, of the Capitol Area Architectural Planning Board (CAAPB) from 2005 to 2010, and of the Minnesota Academic Excellence Foundation Board from 2008 to 2010.

== Civic activities ==
Nelson has been a member of Junior Achievement, the University of Minnesota Citizens Advisory Council, and the Rochester Music Guild. She is a former board member of Next Chapter Ministries, a member of the board of directors of Friends of Mayowood, a member of the Rochester Chamber of Commerce and its Government Affairs and Government Forums Committee, and a former member of the Rochester Symphony Orchestra and Chorale, where she was an Aspiring Conductor winner.

== 2018 U.S. House campaign ==
In October 2017, Nelson announced her candidacy for the United States House of Representatives in the 2018 election. She lost the August 12 Republican primary to Jim Hagedorn.

The 1st district seat became open after Democratic incumbent Tim Walz announced he would not seek reelection to the seat and instead would run for Minnesota governor. Nelson failed to secure the Republican Party endorsement on April 21, 2018, when Jim Hagedorn earned 76% of the vote on the first ballot.
