= Ann Lynch (politician) =

American politician

Member of the Minnesota Senate from the 30th district
- In office January 3, 2007 – January 3, 2011
- Preceded by: Sheila Kiscaden
- Succeeded by: Carla Nelson

Personal details
- Born: December 27, 1964 (age 61) Cedar Rapids, Iowa, U.S.
- Party: Democratic (DFL)
- Spouse: Mike
- Children: 2
- Education: Hamline University
- Occupation: legislator

Ann Lynch (born December 27, 1964) is a Minnesota politician and a former member of the Minnesota Senate who represented District 30, which includes portions of Olmsted and Wabasha counties in the southeastern part of the state. As a Democrat, she was first elected to the Senate in 2006, but was unseated by Republican Carla Nelson in the 2010 general election.

Lynch was a member of the Senate's Capital Investment Committee, the Health, Housing and Family Security Committee, and the Higher Education Committee. She also served on the Finance subcommittees for the Health and Human Services Budget Division (of which she was vice chair), and for the Higher Education Budget and Policy Division. Her special legislative concerns included health care, education, and transportation. She authored a bill in 2007 during a special senate meeting to provide flood disaster relief for the floods of August 2007. In 2010, she later chief authored two bills relating to flood disaster relief, Wadena tornado disaster relief, and provided cash flow and budget reserve adjustments.

Lynch graduated from Cedar Rapids High School in Cedar Rapids, Iowa, then went on to Hamline University in Saint Paul, where she earned her B.A. in Economics. Prior to being elected to the Senate, she served on the Rochester School Board from 2002 to 2006. She and her husband, Mike, live in Rochester, and are the parents of two children.

In 1996, Lynch co-authored the book Visualizing Forest Change. The book was published by the United States Forest Service, Department of Agriculture. The book discusses issues relating to how the U.S. government forest management, including the protection of trees from diseases and pests.
