= Mary Olson =

American politician

Mary A. Olson

Member of the Minnesota Senate from the 4th district
- In office January 3, 2007 – January 3, 2011
- Preceded by: Carrie Ruud
- Succeeded by: John Carlson

Personal details
- Born: May 23, 1958 (age 68) Willmar, Minnesota, U.S.
- Party: DFL
- Spouse: John
- Children: 4
- Education: University of North Dakota
- Occupation: Attorney, legislator

Mary A. Olson (born May 23, 1958) is a Minnesota (US) politician and a former member of the Minnesota Senate who represented District 4, which includes portions of Beltrami, Cass, Crow Wing, Hubbard, and Itasca counties in the northern part of the state. A Democrat, she was first elected in 2006. On November 2, 2010, she lost her re-election bid to the Republican John Carlson.

Olson was a member of the Senate's Commerce & Consumer Protection Committee and Judiciary Committee. She also served on the Finance subcommittees for the Economic Development and Housing Budget Division and the Health and Human Services Budget Division, and on the Judiciary Judiciary Subcommittee for Data Practices, which she chaired.

Olson received a B.A. from the University of North Dakota and earned a J.D. from their law school. Before her election to the Senate, she was the assistant county attorney for Crow Wing County, and also as an attorney for the United States Air Force at March Air Force Base. Her great-great-grandfather, Peter A. Gandrud, was also a member of the Minnesota Legislature. She and her husband, John, have four children.

== Electoral history ==
Minnesota Senate Election District 4, 2010
Party	Candidate	Votes	%	±%
Democratic	Mary A. Olson	15,752	45.31	
Republican	John Carlson	18,956	54.53	

Minnesota Senate Election District 4, 2006
Party	Candidate	Votes	%	±%
Democratic	Mary A. Olson	18,119	52.1%	
Republican	Carrie Ruud	16,635	47.8%	
