= Don Betzold =

American politician

Member of the Minnesota Senate from the 51st district
- In office January 5, 1993 – January 3, 2011
- Succeeded by: Pam Wolf

Personal details
- Born: August 27, 1950 (age 76) Minneapolis, Minnesota
- Party: Minnesota Democratic-Farmer-Labor Party
- Spouse: Leesa
- Children: 1 (Ben)
- Education: University of Minnesota; Hamline University School of Law
- Occupation: Attorney, legislator U.S. Army Reserves (retired)

Donald Betzold (born August 27, 1950) is a Minnesota politician and a former member of the Minnesota Senate who represented District 51, which includes portions of Anoka, Hennepin and Ramsey counties in the northern Twin Cities metropolitan area. Prior to the 2002 redistricting, the area was known as District 48. A Democrat, he was first elected to the Senate in 1992, and was re-elected in 1996, 2000, 2002 and 2006. He was unseated by Republican Pam Wolf in the 2010 general election.

Betzold was a member of the Senate's Finance Committee, the Judiciary Committee, and the State and Local Government Operations and Oversight Committee. He also served on the Finance subcommittees for the Judiciary Budget Division and for the State Government Budget Division (which he chaired), on the Judiciary Subcommittee for Data Practices, on the Rules and Administration Subcommittee for Permanent and Joint Rules, and on the State and Local Government Operations and Oversight Subcommittee for Gaming. His special legislative concerns included human services, environmental issues, local government operations, small business, civil law, mental health, military issues, and data practices.

Betzold is an attorney in Brooklyn Center. He is also a retired military veteran, having served in the U.S. Army as a Signal Corps officer for four years in the 1970s, and in the Army Reserves from 1976 to 2002 in the Judge Advocate General's Corps, from which he retired as a colonel. He graduated from DeLaSalle High School in Minneapolis, then attended the University of Minnesota, where he graduated summa cum laude in 1972 with a B.A. in journalism. He later attended Hamline University School of Law, earning his J.D. in 1979.

Prior to being elected to the senate, Betzold was chair of the Fridley Planning Commission from 1986 to 1992, and also served on the Fridley City Charter Commission from 1983 to 1992. From 2006 to 2008 he served on the Minnesota Statehood Sesquicentennial Commission, to which he was appointed by Governor Tim Pawlenty.
