= Archie H. Miller =

American politician

Archie Miller
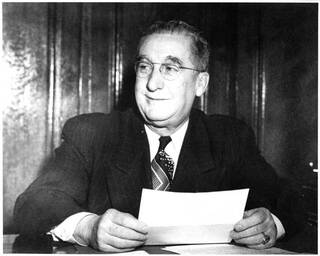
- Miller in 1949

32nd Lieutenant Governor of Minnesota
- In office May 6, 1943 – January 2, 1945
- Governor: Edward John Thye
- Preceded by: Edward John Thye
- Succeeded by: C. Elmer Anderson

2nd Minnesota Senate Majority Leader
- In office 1949 – February 11, 1958
- Preceded by: Charles N. Orr
- Succeeded by: John M. Zwach

Minnesota State Senator
- In office January 2, 1945 – February 11, 1958

Minnesota State Senator
- In office January 5, 1931 – May 6, 1943

Personal details
- Born: June 8, 1886 Hopkins, Minnesota, U.S.
- Died: February 11, 1958 (aged 71) Minneapolis, Minnesota, U.S.
- Party: Republican; Nonpartisan, Conservative Caucus
- Spouse: Ruth Miller
- Education: Minnesota College of Law
- Occupation: Attorney

Archie H. Miller (June 8, 1886 – February 11, 1958) was the 32nd lieutenant governor of Minnesota.

Miller was born in Hopkins, Minnesota. Miller began politics as a member of the Hopkins Village Council, and as a member of the Hopkins school board for ten years. He served as a state senator from 1931 to 1943, and became Lieutenant Governor after Edward John Thye resigned to become Governor. He served from May 6, 1943, to January 2, 1945.

After leaving office, he returned to the Senate, becoming majority leader in 1949, following the death of Charlie Orr in a car crash. Miller served in that position until his death in 1958.

Political offices
Preceded by Edward John Thye	Lieutenant Governor of Minnesota; 1943–1945	Succeeded by C. Elmer Anderson
