= Mark Ourada =

American politician

Member of the Minnesota Senate from the 19th district
- In office 1995–2005

Personal details
- Born: April 28, 1956 (age 70) Olmsted County, Minnesota, U.S.
- Party: Republican
- Children: 2
- Education: Saint John's University
- Occupation: laboratory technician

Mark Nicholas Ourada (born April 28, 1956) is an American politician in the state of Minnesota. He served in the Minnesota Senate from 1995 to 2005.
