= Kathy Sheran =

American politician (born 1947)

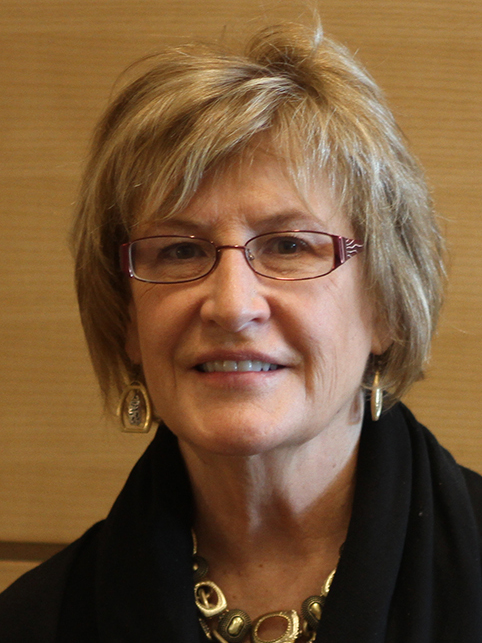

Member of the Minnesota Senate from the 19th district 23rd (2007–2013)
- In office January 3, 2007 – January 2, 2017
- Preceded by: John Hottinger
- Succeeded by: Nick Frentz

Personal details
- Born: May 18, 1947 (age 79) Mankato, Minnesota, U.S.
- Party: Minnesota Democratic–Farmer–Labor Party
- Spouse: Dean Doyscher
- Children: 3
- Education: College of Saint Teresa; Minnesota State University, Mankato
- Occupation: registered nurse, educator

Kathleen J. "Kathy" Sheran (born May 18, 1947) is a Minnesota politician and former member of the Minnesota Senate. A member of the Minnesota Democratic–Farmer–Labor Party (DFL), she represented District 19, which included portions of Blue Earth, Le Sueur, and Nicollet counties in the south central part of the state.

== Early life, education, and career ==
Sheran is the daughter of Robert Sheran, who is a former chief justice and associate justice of the Minnesota Supreme Court, and a former member of the Minnesota House of Representatives. She graduated from Convent of the Visitation School in Mendota Heights in 1965, then attended the College of Saint Teresa in Winona, receiving her B.S. in Nursing. She later earned her M.S. degree at Mankato State University (now called Minnesota State University). Sheran is a registered nurse by profession and former assistant professor of nursing at Minnesota State University in Mankato.

Sheran has been active in Mankato city government for many years. She served briefly as mayor, and was a member of the city council for 16 years, during which time she was council president and Mayor Pro Tem. She is a former member of the city's Civil Service Commission, the Economic Development Authority, the Housing Redevelopment Authority, and the Human Rights Commission.

== Minnesota Senate ==
Sheran was first elected to the Senate in 2006, and was re-elected in 2010 and 2012. She served as a majority whip during the 2007-2008 and 2009-2010 bienniums. Her special legislative concerns include health care, education, tax policy, agriculture, transportation, and the environment. She did not seek re-election in 2016.

== Personal life ==
Sheran has served on various state and local boards and committees. She was a member of the Minnesota Governor's Judicial Selection Commission and the Minnesota Lawyers Professional Responsibility Board. She is a member of the Board of Directors of Immanuel-St. Joseph's Hospital in Mankato, which is an owned affiliate of the Mayo Clinic. She is also co-chair of Generations of Care, a community partnership in support of Immanuel-St. Joseph's Heart and Cancer Centers. She also hosts "Community Conversations," a Public-access television cable TV show in the Mankato area. She has also been honored as a Woman of Distinction by YWCA Mankato.
