= John P. Doll =

American politician

Member of the Minnesota Senate from the 40th district
- In office January 2, 2007 – January 4, 2011
- Preceded by: William V. Belanger Jr.
- Succeeded by: Dan Hall

Personal details
- Born: March 12, 1961 (age 65) Minneapolis, Minnesota
- Party: Minnesota Democratic-Farmer-Labor Party
- Spouse: Robyn
- Children: 6
- Education: Anoka-Ramsey Community College; University of Minnesota
- Profession: business owner, legislator

John P. Doll (born March 12, 1961) is a Minnesota politician and a former member of the Minnesota Senate who represented District 40, which includes portions of the cities of Burnsville, Savage and Bloomington in Dakota, Hennepin and Scott counties. A Democrat, he was first elected in 2006. He was unseated by Republican Dan Hall in the 2010 general election.

Doll was a member of the Energy, Utilities, Technology and Communications, the Health, Housing and Family Security, and the Transportation committees. He also served on the Finance Subcommittee for the Transportation Budget and Policy Division.

Doll attended the University of Minnesota, Anoka-Ramsey Community College, and currently attends Normandale Community College. He resides in Burnsville with his wife Robyn.
