= Dave Senjem =

American politician

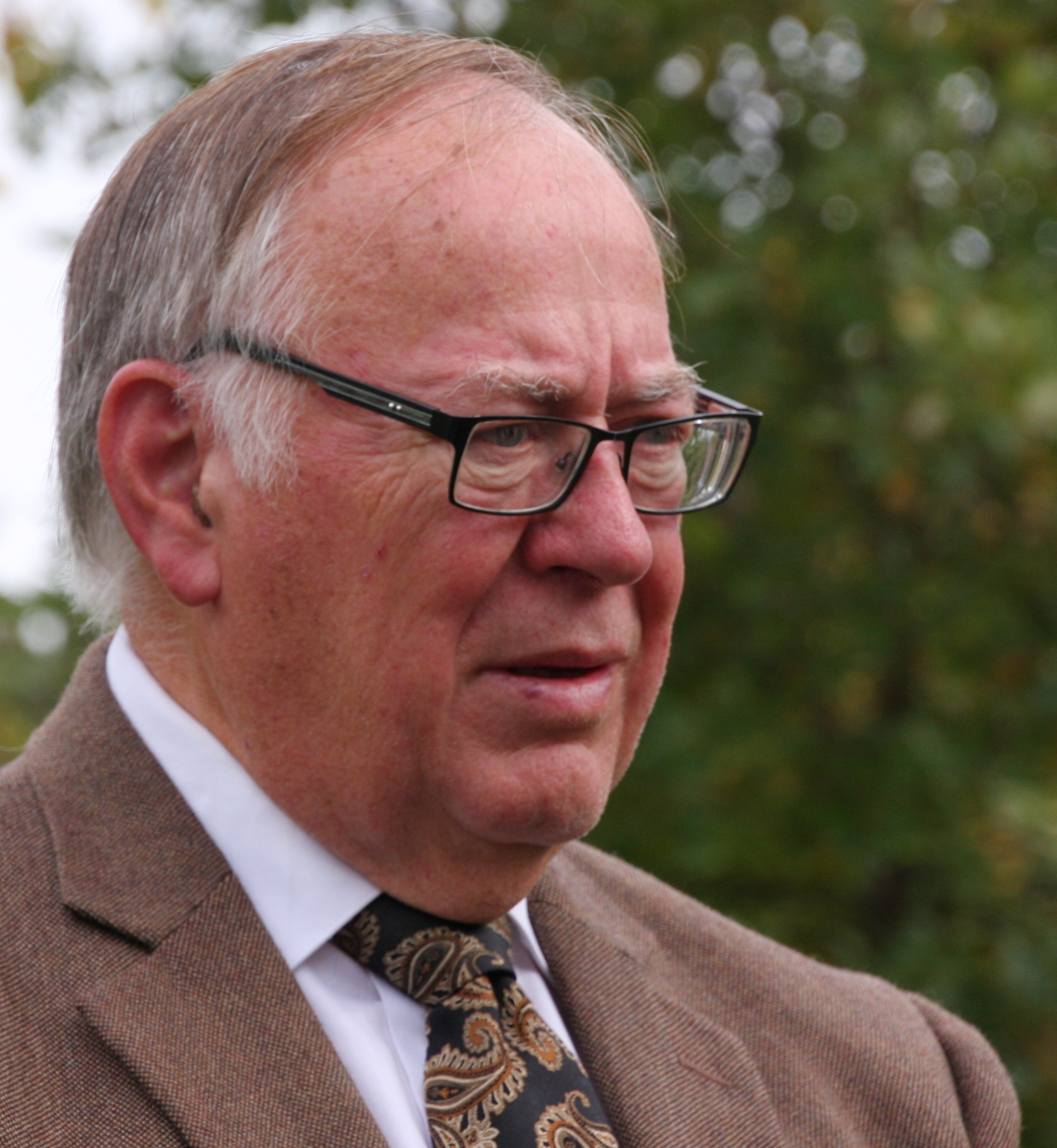
- Senjem in 2016

Chair of the Olmsted County Board of Commissioners
- Incumbent
- Assumed office January 6, 2026
- Preceded by: Mark Thein

Member of the Olmsted County Board of Commissioners from the 2nd District
- Incumbent
- Assumed office January 3, 2023
- Preceded by: Ken Brown

Majority Leader of the Minnesota Senate
- In office December 27, 2011 – January 7, 2013
- Preceded by: Amy Koch
- Succeeded by: Tom Bakk

Minority Leader of the Minnesota Senate
- In office January 3, 2007 – January 3, 2011
- Preceded by: Dick Day
- Succeeded by: Tom Bakk

Member of the Minnesota Senate from the 25th district 29th (2003–2013)
- In office January 7, 2003 – January 3, 2023
- Preceded by: redrawn district
- Succeeded by: Liz Boldon

Personal details
- Born: December 20, 1942 (age 83) Austin, Minnesota, U.S.
- Party: Republican
- Spouse: Marlys
- Children: 2
- Education: Luther College
- Occupation: legislator

David Howard Senjem (/ˈsɛndʒəm/ SEN-jəm; born December 20, 1942) is an American politician currently serving on the Olmsted County Board of Commissioners. He is a former member of the Minnesota Senate, serving in that body from 2003 to 2023. He led the Republican caucus as majority leader from 2011 to 2013. A moderate Republican, Senjem has crossed party lines on many occasions, notably environmental policy and women's issues. He represented District 25, which at the time included portions of Dodge and Olmsted counties in the southeastern part of the state. Much of the northern half of Rochester was in his district.

In April 2022, Senjem announced that he would not seek reelection to the Minnesota Senate, and later announced that he would instead run for Olmsted County Commissioner for District 2. Senjem won election to that seat and was took office in 2023. In January 2026, Senjem was named Chair of the Olmsted County Board of Commissioners.

== Early life, education, and career ==
Senjem grew up in Hayfield, Minnesota and attended Hayfield High School. After graduating, he earned a Bachelor of Arts degree from Luther College in Decorah, Iowa. He served on the Rochester City Park Board for five years, then on the Rochester City Council from 1992 to 2002. He is a retired Environmental Affairs Officer for the Mayo Clinic in Rochester.

Senjem's family originates from Bingen, Buskerud County, Norway; the original family name was Sønju. His great-great-grandfather John N. Hanson served as a Republican state representative from Dodge County from 1873 to 1874.

== Political positions ==
Senjem is generally regarded as a moderate and centrist Republican. He has been reelected multiple times even when his district backed Democratic candidates in other races. He has received praise from both sides for his bipartisanship. In January 2021, Democratic Attorney General Keith Ellison described Senjem as "open-minded" and said, "In an age where the parties are as polarized as at any point in our nation's history, Senjem is a guy who's willing to work across the aisle."

=== Environment ===
Senjem is a member of the National Caucus of Environmental Legislators.

The NCEL awarded Senjem with the 2021 Leon G. Billings Environmental Achievement Award in recognition of his accomplishments in environmental policy.

Senjem served as the chair of the Senate Energy and Utilities Finance and Policy Committee. In 2021, he supported the Energy Conservation and Optimization Act despite opposition from other Republicans.

=== Women's Issues ===
Senjem is the only male and sole Republican to serve on the Advisory Task Force on Expanding the Economic Security of Women. He was appointed to the task force by Democratic Attorney General Keith Ellison. Ellison stated that Senjem's voting record shows his concern for women's issues.

=== Medical Marijuana ===
Senjem supports legalized medical marijuana. In 2014, he was one of eight Republican senators to back a bill allowing for medical marijuana in the state.

=== Economy ===
Senjem is rated highly by the Minnesota Chamber of Commerce and the National Federation of Independent Business.

== Minnesota Senate ==
Senjem was first elected in 2002, and was reelected in 2006, 2010, 2012, 2016, and 2020. He served as minority leader from 2007 until January 3, 2011. On December 27, 2011, Senjem was elected majority leader after the previous majority leader, Amy Koch, resigned over an affair with a Senate staffer. Senjem became the third person to serve as both minority and majority leader, and the first to serve in both roles as a Republican.

Senjem tested positive for COVID-19 in November 2020. Upon finding out, the Minnesota Senate Republican chief of staff warned other Republicans of the positive test, but did not tell Democratic state legislators about the positive test, thus preventing them from taking the appropriate precautions.

Minnesota Senate
New district Redistricting	Senator from the 25th District; 29th (2003–2013); 2003–present	Incumbent
Party political offices
Preceded by Dick Day	Minnesota Senate Minority Leader; 2007–2011	Succeeded by Tom Bakk
Preceded by Amy Koch	Minnesota Senate Majority Leader; 2011–2013	Succeeded by Tom Bakk
