= 2018 United States House of Representatives elections in Minnesota =

- November 6, 2018

All 8 Minnesota seats to the United States House of Representatives
	Majority party	Minority party
Party	Democratic (DFL)	Republican
Last election	5 seats, 50.15%	3 seats, 46.66%
Seats before	5	3
Seats won	5	3
Seat change	Steady	Steady
Popular vote	1,420,769	1,125,533
Percentage	55.13%	43.68%
Swing	▲4.90%	▼3.05%

Democratic hold Democratic gain
Republican hold Republican gain
Democratic
50–60%
60–70%
70–80%
Republican
50–60%
60–70%

The 2018 United States House of Representatives elections in Minnesota were held on November 6, 2018, to elect the eight U.S. representatives from the state of Minnesota, one from each of the state's eight congressional districts. The elections coincided with an open gubernatorial election, a U.S. Senate election, a special U.S. Senate election, State House elections, and other elections. Primaries were held on August 14.

In the 2018 elections, Democrats gained the 2nd and 3rd districts from Republican incumbents, and the Republicans gained the 1st and 8th districts from Democrats running for higher office, leaving party representation in Minnesota's House delegation unchanged at five members from the DFL and three members from the GOP.

== Overview ==
=== Statewide ===
Party	Candidates	Votes		Seats		
Party	Candidates	No.	%	No.	+/–	%
Democratic-Farmer-Labor	8	1,420,769	55.13	5	Steady	62.50
Republican	8	1,125,533	43.68	3	Steady	37.50
Legal Marijuana Now	1	13,777	0.53	0	Steady	0.0
Independence	1	12,741	0.49	0	Steady	0.0
Write-in	8	4,177	0.16	0	Steady	0.0
Total	26	2,576,996	100.0	8	Steady	100.0

Popular vote
Democratic	55.13%
Republican	43.68%
Other	1.19%

House seats
Democratic	62.50%
Republican	37.50%

=== By district ===
Results of the 2018 United States House of Representatives elections in Minnesota by district:

District	Democratic		Republican		Others		Total		Result
District	Votes	%	Votes	%	Votes	%	Votes	%	Result
District 1	144,885	49.67%	146,200	50.13%	576	0.20%	291,661	100.0%	Republican gain
District 2	177,958	52.65%	159,344	47.15%	666	0.20%	337,968	100.0%	Democratic gain
District 3	202,404	55.61%	160,839	44.19%	706	0.20%	363,949	100.0%	Democratic gain
District 4	216,865	65.99%	97,747	29.75%	14,002	4.26%	328,614	100.0%	Democratic hold
District 5	267,703	77.97%	74,440	21.68%	1,215	0.35%	343,358	100.0%	Democratic hold
District 6	122,332	38.75%	192,931	61.11%	463	0.15%	315,726	100.0%	Republican hold
District 7	146,672	52.10%	134,668	47.84%	169	0.06%	281,509	100.0%	Democratic hold
District 8	141,950	45.18%	159,364	50.72%	12,897	4.10%	314,211	100.0%	Republican gain
Total	1,420,769	55.13%	1,125,533	43.68%	30,694	1.19%	2,576,996	100.0%	

== District 1 ==
2018 Minnesota's 1st congressional district election
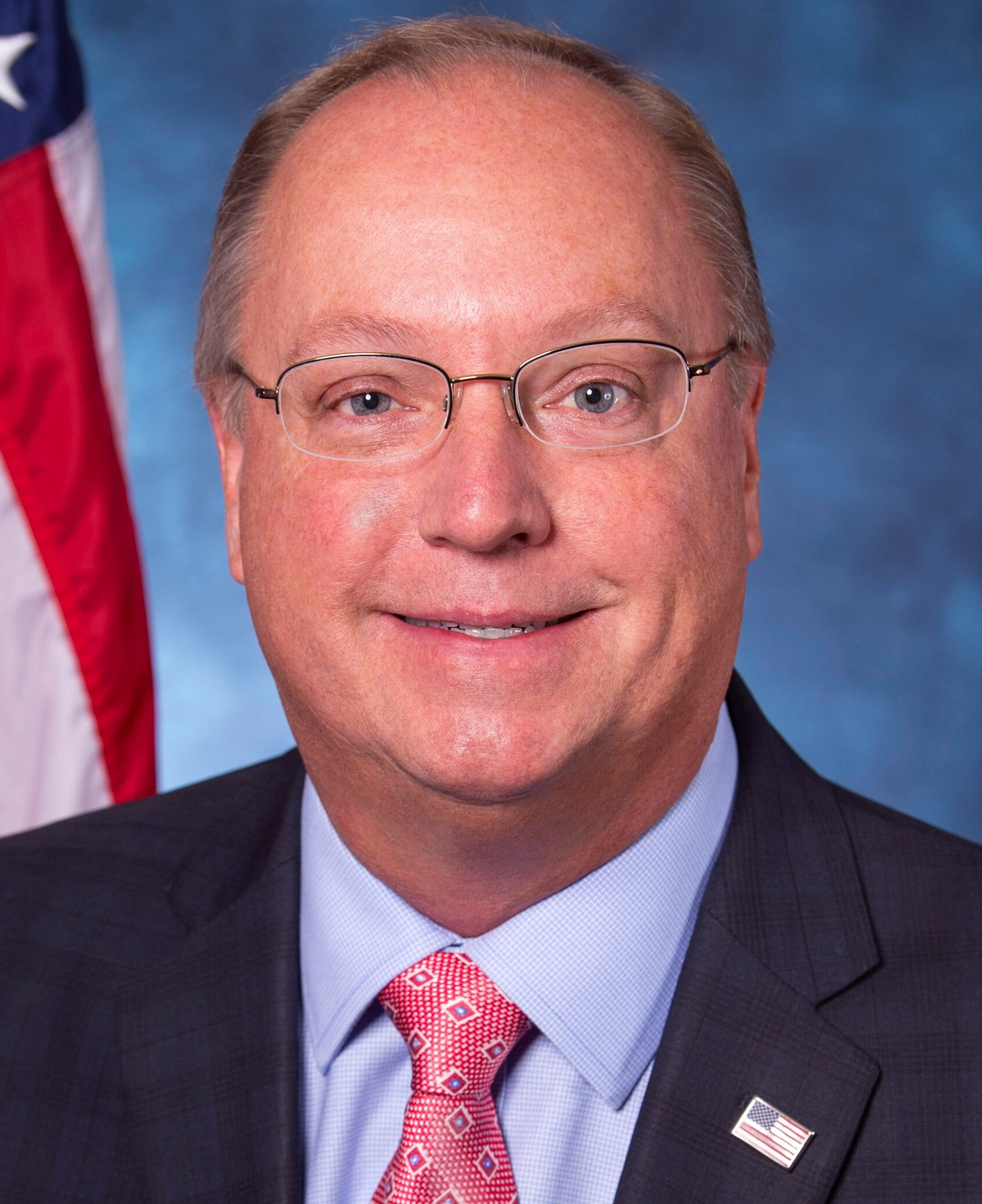

Nominee	Jim Hagedorn	Dan Feehan
Party	Republican	Democratic (DFL)
Popular vote	146,199	144,884
Percentage	50.1%	49.7%
- Hagedorn: 40–50% 50–60% 60–70% 70–80% 80–90% >90% Feehan: 50–60% 60–70% 70–80% >90% Tie: 40–50% 50% No votes
U.S. Representative before election
Tim Walz
Democratic (DFL)
Elected U.S. Representative
Jim Hagedorn
Republican

Minnesota's 1st Congressional District extends across southern Minnesota, from the border with South Dakota to the border with Wisconsin and the state's entire border with Iowa.

Incumbent Democrat Tim Walz, who had represented the district since 2007, did not run for re-election, instead opting to run for governor. He was re-elected with 50% of the vote in 2016. The district had a PVI of R+5. This was the first election for this seat to be won by a Republican since 2004.

=== Democratic primary ===
==== Candidates ====
===== Nominee =====
- Dan Feehan, Army veteran and former Acting Assistant Secretary of Defense for Readiness

===== Eliminated in primary =====
- Colin "Coke" Minehart, restaurateur

===== Withdrawn =====
- Johnny Akzam, personal coach and website developer
- John Austinson, teacher
- Vicki Jensen, former state senator (endorsed Feehan)
- Regina Mustafa, activist
- Robert Ries, U.S. Navy veteran
- Joe Sullivan, clean energy advocate (endorsed Feehan)
- Rich Wright, attorney and nominee for state senate in 2016 (endorsed Feehan)

===== Declined =====
- Tim Walz, incumbent U.S. Representative

==== Endorsements ====
Dan Feehan

U.S. Representatives

- Seth Moulton, U.S. Representative (D-MA)

State legislators

- Vicki Jensen, former state senator

Organizations

- End Citizens United
- Human Rights Campaign
- NARAL Pro-Choice America
- VoteVets
Vicki Jensen

Local and statewide politicians

- Robert Beussman, Mayor of New Ulm
Joe Sullivan

Organizations

- League of Conservation Voters Action Fund
Rich Wright

Organizations

- Our Revolution

==== Primary results ====
Democratic primary results
Party	Candidate	Votes	%
Democratic (DFL)	Dan Feehan	39,167	83.1
Democratic (DFL)	Colin Minehart	7,971	16.9
Total votes		47,138	100.0

=== Republican primary ===
Minnesota's 1st congressional district was listed as one of the NRCC's initial targets in 2018.

==== Candidates ====
===== Nominee =====
- Jim Hagedorn, blogger, candidate for this seat in 2010 and nominee in 2014 & 2016

===== Eliminated in primary =====
- Andrew Candler, convenience store worker
- Carla Nelson, state senator
- Stephen Williams, farmer, candidate for this seat in 2016, Independence nominee for the U.S. Senate 2012, candidate in 2008 and 2012 and candidate for Lieutenant Governor in 2010

===== Declined =====
- Nels Pierson, state representative
- Joe Schomacker, state representative

==== Endorsements ====
Jim Hagedorn

U.S. Senators

- Rudy Boschwitz, former U.S. Senator

U.S. Representatives

- Tom Emmer, U.S. Representative
- Gil Gutknecht, former U.S. Representative
- John Kline, former U.S. Representative
- Frank Lucas, U.S. Representative
- Bill Shuster, U.S. Representative

State legislators

- Tony Cornish, state representative
- Gary Dahms, state senator
- Jeremy Munson, state representative
- Julie Rosen, state senator
- Paul Torkelson, state representative

Labor unions

- Associated Builders and Contractors

Organizations

- Family Research Council
Carla Nelson

State legislators

- Nels Pierson, state representative

Organizations

- CatholicVote.org
- Maggie's List
- NRA Political Victory Fund
- Susan B. Anthony List

==== Polling ====
Poll source	Date(s) administered	Sample size (Note: Key: A – all adults RV – registered voters LV – likely voters V – unclear)	Margin of error	Jim Hagedorn	Carla Nelson	Undecided
Harper Polling (R–Hagedorn)	February 19–20, 2018	412 (LV)	±4.8%	54%	21%	25%

==== Primary results ====
Republican primary results
Party	Candidate	Votes	%
Republican	Jim Hagedorn	25,418	60.1
Republican	Carla Nelson	13,589	32.2
Republican	Steve Williams	2,145	5.1
Republican	Andrew Candler	1,106	2.6
Total votes		42,258	100.0

=== General election ===
==== Endorsements ====
Dan Feehan (DFL)

U.S. Representatives

- Seth Moulton, U.S. Representative (D-MA)

State legislators

- Vicki Jensen, former state senator

Organizations

- Democratic Congressional Campaign Committee "Red to Blue" Program
- End Citizens United
- Human Rights Campaign
- NARAL Pro-Choice America
- Sierra Club
- VoteVets
Jim Hagedorn (R)

U.S. Executive Branch officials

- Donald Trump, president of the United States

U.S. Senators

- Rudy Boschwitz, former U.S. Senator

U.S. Representatives

- Tom Emmer, U.S. Representative
- Gil Gutknecht, former U.S. Representative
- John Kline, former U.S. Representative
- Frank Lucas, U.S. Representative
- Bill Shuster, U.S. Representative

State legislators

- Tony Cornish, state representative
- Gary Dahms, state senator
- Jeremy Munson, state representative
- Julie Rosen, state senator
- Paul Torkelson, state representative

Labor unions

- Associated Builders and Contractors
- International Brotherhood of Boilermakers

Organizations

- Family Research Council
- Minnesota Citizens Concerned for Life
- National Republican Congressional Committee "Young Guns" Program

==== Debate & forum ====
2018 Minnesota's 1st congressional district debate & candidate forum
No.	Date	Host	Moderator	Link	Democratic	Republican
Key: P Participant A Absent N Not invited I Invited W Withdrawn						
Key: P Participant A Absent N Not invited I Invited W Withdrawn					Dan Feehan	Jim Hagedorn
1	Oct. 12, 2018	Minnesota Public Radio	Mike Mulcahy		P	P
2	Oct. 17, 2018	Greater Mankato Growth; South Central College; The Free Press	Patrick Baker; Steve Jameson		P	P

==== Polling ====
Poll source	Date(s) administered	Sample size	Margin of error	Dan Feehan (DFL)	Jim Hagedorn (R)	Other	Undecided
SurveyUSA	October 16–20, 2018	586 (LV)	±4.4%	47%	45%	–	8%
Harper Polling (R-Hagedorn)	August 23–26, 2018	400 (LV)	±4.9%	33%	47%	6%	14%

==== Predictions ====
Source	Ranking	As of
The Cook Political Report	Tossup	November 5, 2018
Inside Elections	Tossup	November 5, 2018
Sabato's Crystal Ball	Lean D	November 5, 2018
RCP	Tossup	November 5, 2018
Daily Kos	Tossup	November 5, 2018
538	Tossup	November 7, 2018

==== Results ====
Minnesota's 1st congressional district, 2018
Party	Candidate	Votes	%
Republican	Jim Hagedorn	146,199	50.1
Democratic (DFL)	Dan Feehan	144,884	49.7
Write-in		575	0.2
Majority		1,315	0.5
Total votes		291,658	100.0
Republican gain from Democratic (DFL)			

==== Finances ====
===== Campaigns =====
Candidate (party)	Raised	Spent	Cash on hand
Dan Feehan (DFL)	$4,121,229	$4,117,708	$3,521
Jim Hagedorn (R)	$1,584,923	$1,584,057	$1,092

===== Outside Spending =====
Candidate (party)	Supported	Opposed
Dan Feehan (DFL)	$2,716,864	$6,911,780
Jim Hagedorn (R)	$288,762	$4,101,940

== District 2 ==
2018 Minnesota's 2nd congressional district election
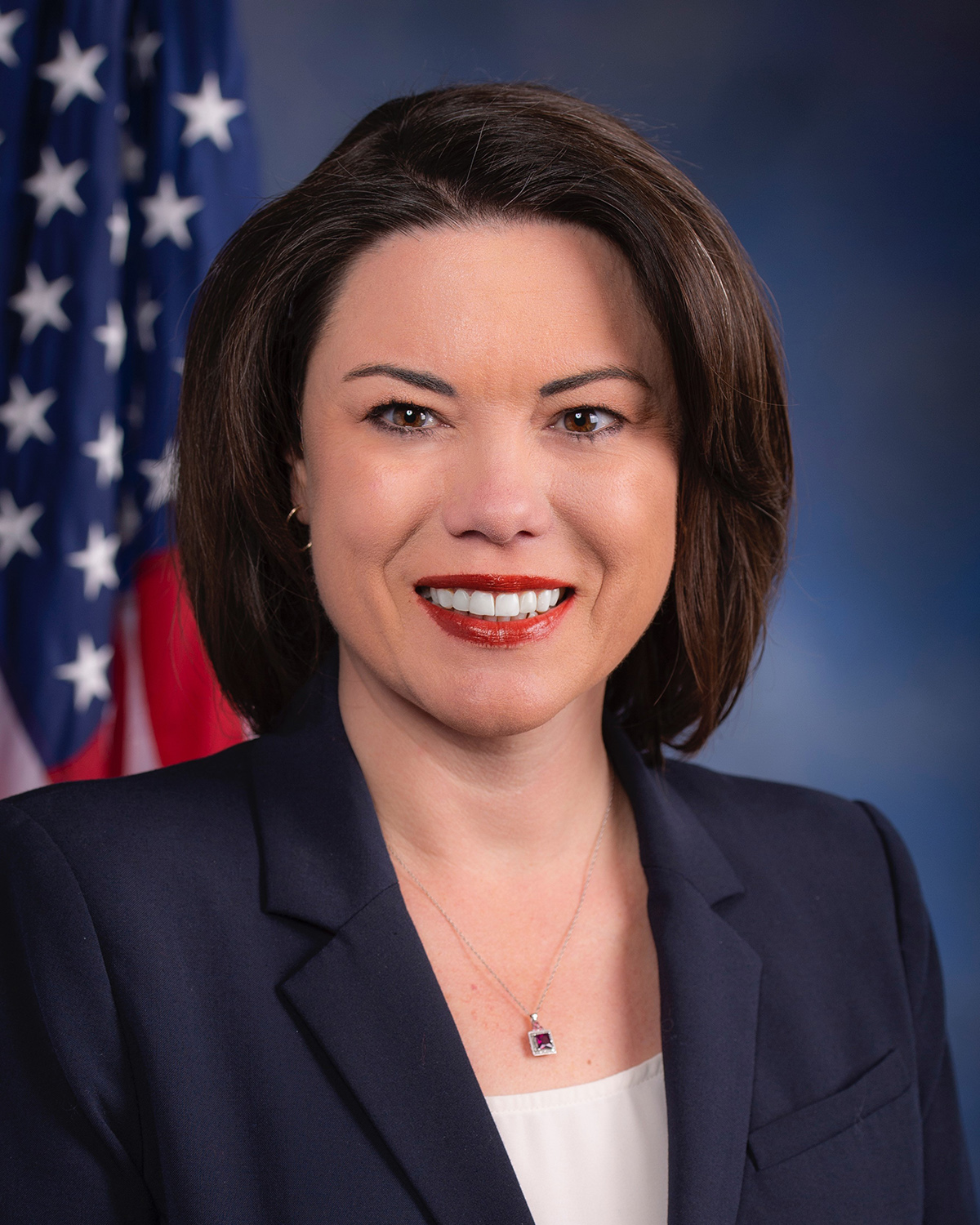

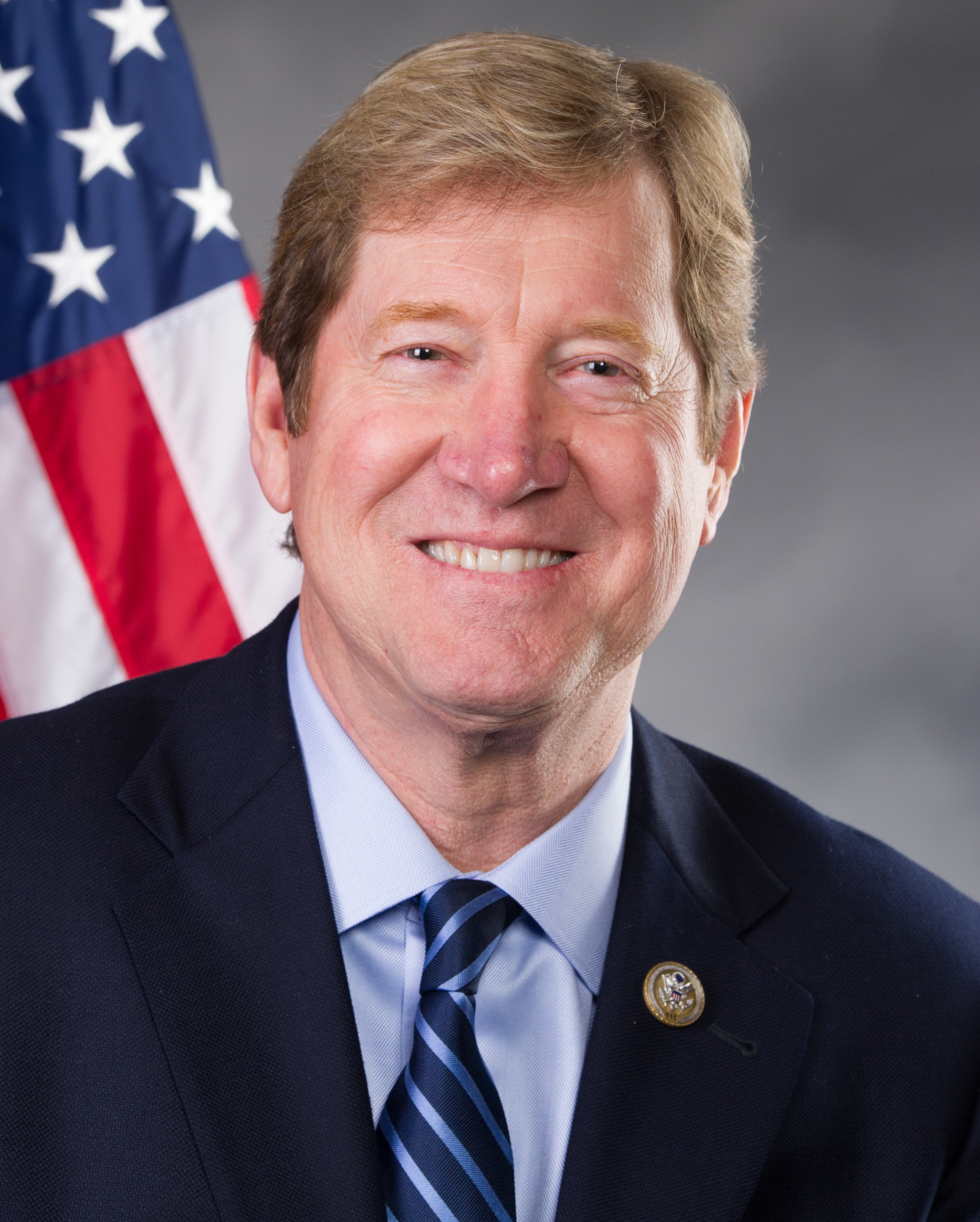
Nominee	Angie Craig	Jason Lewis
Party	Democratic (DFL)	Republican
Popular vote	177,954	159,343
Percentage	52.7%	47.1%
- Precinct results Craig: 50–60% 60–70% 70–80% 80–90% >90% Lewis: 50–60% 60–70% 70–80% 80–90% Tie: 40–50%
U.S. Representative before election
Jason Lewis
Republican
Elected U.S. Representative
Angie Craig
Democratic (DFL)

Incumbent Republican Jason Lewis, who had represented the district since 2017, ran for re-election. He was elected with 47% of the vote in 2016. The district had a PVI of R+2.

=== Republican primary ===
==== Candidates ====
===== Nominee =====
- Jason Lewis, incumbent U.S. Representative

=== Democratic primary ===
==== Candidates ====
===== Nominee =====
- Angie Craig, former St. Jude Medical executive and nominee for this seat in 2016

===== Withdrawn =====
- Jeff Erdmann, high school football coach

=== Independence primary ===
==== Candidates ====
===== Withdrawn =====
- Bradley Svenson

=== General election ===
==== Endorsements ====
Jason Lewis (R)

U.S. Executive Branch officials

- Donald Trump, president of the United States

State officials

- Tim Pawlenty, former governor of Minnesota

State legislators

- Jeff Johnson, former state representative (43A), nominee for governor of Minnesota in 2014 and 2018

Labor unions

- International Brotherhood of Boilermakers

Organizations

- National Republican Congressional Committee "Patriot" Program
Angie Craig (DFL)

U.S. Representatives

- Gabrielle Giffords, Former U.S. Representative
- Rick Nolan, U.S. Representative (DFL-MN)
- Tim Walz, U.S. Representative (DFL-MN)

State legislators

- Jim Carlson, State Senator
- Greg Clausen, State Senator
- Chris Coleman, Former Mayor of Saint Paul, Minnesota
- Kevin Dahle, Former State Senator
- Scott Dibble, State Senator
- Laurie Halverson, State Representative
- Erin Murphy, State Representative
- Melissa Hortman, Minority Leader of Minnesota House of Representatives
- Erin Maye Quade, State Representative
- Sandy Masin, State Representative
- Matt Schmidt, Former State Senator
- Paul Thissen, State Representative

Labor unions

- American Federation of Government Employees
- American Federation of State, County and Municipal Employees Council 5
- American Federation of State, County and Municipal Employees Council 65
- Communications Workers of America
- Education Minnesota
- Minnesota AFL–CIO
- Service Employees International Union Minnesota State Council

Organizations

- Congressional Progressive Caucus
- Democratic Congressional Campaign Committee "Red to Blue" Program
- EMILY's List
- End Citizens United
- Gay & Lesbian Victory Fund
- Giffords
- Human Rights Campaign
- League of Conservation Voters Action Fund
- LGBT Equality Caucus
- LPAC
- Minnesota Democratic Farmer-Labor Party
- New Democrat Coalition
- Stonewall Democrats DFL Caucus

Newspapers

- Star Tribune

==== Polling ====
Poll source	Date(s) administered	Sample size	Margin of error	Jason Lewis (R)	Angie Craig (DFL)	Undecided
Global Strategy Group (D)	October 9–14, 2018	400	±4.9%	43%	52%	15%
NYT Upshot/Siena College	September 29 – October 2, 2018	487 (LV)	±5.0%	39%	51%	9%
WPA Intelligence (R-Lewis)	September 29 – October 1, 2018	412 (LV)	±4.9%	46%	43%	9%
SurveyUSA	September 17–23, 2018	569 (LV)	±4.5%	45%	48%	7%
Public Policy Polling (D)	September 17–18, 2018	531 (V)	–	45%	48%	7%
WPA Intelligence (R-Lewis)	August 18–21, 2018	400 (LV)	±4.9%	46%	45%	9%
Public Policy Polling (D)	October 4–7, 2017	732 (V)	±3.6%	43%	42%	15%

==== Debates ====
2018 Minnesota's 2nd congressional district debate
No.	Date	Host	Moderator	Link	Republican	Democratic
Key: P Participant A Absent N Not invited I Invited W Withdrawn						
Key: P Participant A Absent N Not invited I Invited W Withdrawn					Jason Lewis	Angie Craig
1	Oct. 19, 2018	Twin Cities Public Television	Eric Eskola; Cathy Wurzer		P	P

==== Predictions ====
Source	Ranking	As of
The Cook Political Report	Lean D (flip)	November 5, 2018
Inside Elections	Tilt D (flip)	November 5, 2018
Sabato's Crystal Ball	Lean D (flip)	November 5, 2018
RCP	Lean D (flip)	November 5, 2018
Daily Kos	Tossup	November 5, 2018
538	Likely D (flip)	November 7, 2018

==== Results ====
Minnesota's 2nd congressional district, 2018
Party	Candidate	Votes	%
Democratic (DFL)	Angie Craig	177,954	52.7
Republican	Jason Lewis (incumbent)	159,343	47.1
Write-in		668	0.2
Majority		18,611	5.5
Total votes		337,965	100.0
Democratic (DFL) gain from Republican			

==== Finances ====
===== Campaigns =====
Candidate (party)	Raised	Spent	Cash on hand
Jason Lewis (R)	$2,916,211	$2,918,685	$7,363
Angie Craig (DFL)	$5,312,788	$5,237,900	$87,391

===== Outside Spending =====
Candidate (party)	Supported	Opposed
Jason Lewis (R)	$142,761	$4,515,629
Angie Craig (DFL)	$1,052,637	$3,029,749

== District 3 ==
2018 Minnesota's 3rd congressional district election
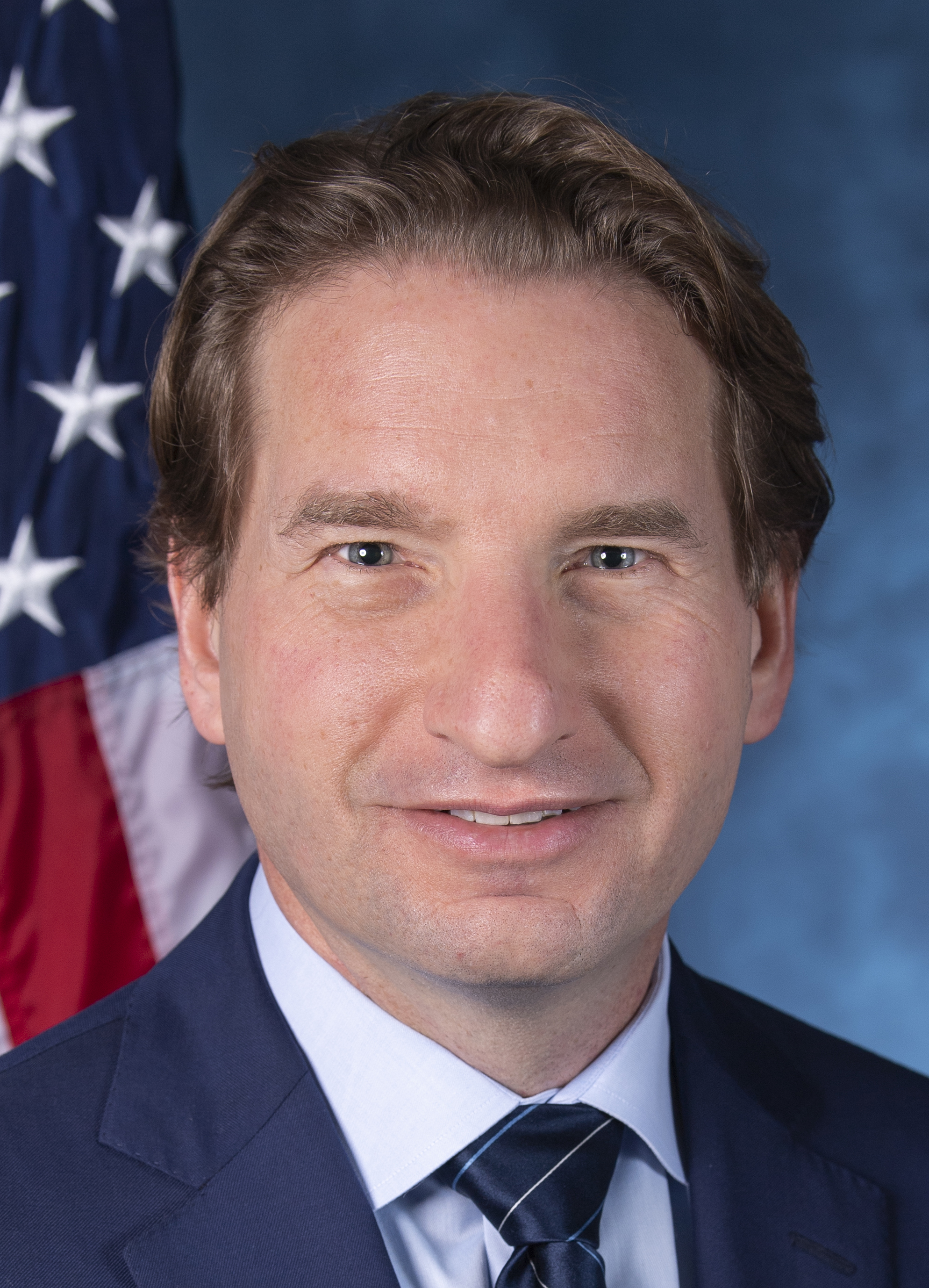

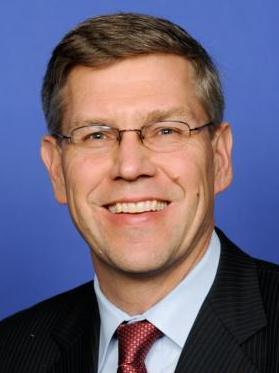
Nominee	Dean Phillips	Erik Paulsen
Party	Democratic (DFL)	Republican
Popular vote	202,402	160,839
Percentage	55.6%	44.2%
- Precinct results Phillips: 40–50% 50–60% 60–70% 70–80% Paulsen: 40–50% 50–60% 60–70% No votes
U.S. Representative before election
Erik Paulsen
Republican
Elected U.S. Representative
Dean Phillips
Democratic (DFL)

Incumbent Republican Erik Paulsen, who had represented the district since 2009, ran for re-election. He was re-elected with 57% of the vote in 2016. The district had a PVI of D+1.

=== Republican primary ===
==== Candidates ====
===== Nominee =====
- Erik Paulsen, incumbent U.S. Representative

==== Primary results ====
Republican primary results
Party	Candidate	Votes	%
Republican	Erik Paulsen (incumbent)	39,080	100.0
Total votes		39,080	100.0

=== Democratic primary ===
==== Candidates ====
===== Nominee =====
- Dean Phillips, businessman

===== Eliminated in primary =====
- Cole Young, retail store employee

===== Withdrawn =====
- Alicia Donahue, social worker and founder of the Minnesota Women’s March
- Adam Jennings, Tonka Bay City Council member
- Brian Santa Maria, former writer for The Onion and a digital advertising professional

==== Primary results ====
Democratic primary results
Party	Candidate	Votes	%
Democratic (DFL)	Dean Phillips	56,697	81.6
Democratic (DFL)	Cole Young	12,784	18.4
Total votes		69,481	100.0

=== General election ===
==== Endorsements ====
Erik Paulsen (R)

Labor unions

- International Brotherhood of Boilermakers

Organizations

- National Republican Congressional Committee "Patriot" Program
Dean Phillips (DFL)

Labor unions

- Communications Workers of America

Organizations

- Democratic Congressional Campaign Committee "Red to Blue" Program

==== Debates ====
2018 Minnesota's 3rd congressional district debates
No.	Date	Host	Moderator	Link	Republican	Democratic
Key: P Participant A Absent N Not invited I Invited W Withdrawn						
Key: P Participant A Absent N Not invited I Invited W Withdrawn					Erik Paulsen	Dean Phillips
1	Oct. 5, 2018	KNOW-FM	Mike Mulcahy		P	P
2	Oct. 19, 2018	Twin Cities Public Television	Eric Eskola; Cathy Wurzer		P	P

==== Polling ====
Poll source	Date(s) administered	Sample size	Margin of error	Erik Paulsen (R)	Dean Phillips (DFL)	Undecided
SurveyUSA	September 24–29, 2018	607 (LV)	±4.3%	44%	49%	8%
Public Policy Polling (D)	September 17–18, 2018	538 (V)	–	39%	52%	9%
NYT Upshot/Siena College	September 7–9, 2018	500 (LV)	±4.6%	42%	51%	7%
Public Policy Polling (D)	February 12–13, 2018	664 (V)	±3.8%	43%	46%	11%
Public Policy Polling (D)	November 9–10, 2017	542 (V)	±4.2%	42%	46%	12%

==== Predictions ====
Source	Ranking	As of
The Cook Political Report	Lean D (flip)	November 5, 2018
Inside Elections	Tilt D (flip)	November 5, 2018
Sabato's Crystal Ball	Lean D (flip)	November 5, 2018
RCP	Lean D (flip)	November 5, 2018
Daily Kos	Tossup	November 5, 2018
538	Likely D (flip)	November 7, 2018

==== Results ====
Minnesota's 3rd congressional district, 2018
Party	Candidate	Votes	%
Democratic (DFL)	Dean Phillips	202,402	55.6
Republican	Erik Paulsen (incumbent)	160,839	44.2
Write-in		707	0.2
Majority		41,563	11.4
Total votes		363,948	100.0
Democratic (DFL) gain from Republican			

==== Finances ====
===== Campaigns =====
Candidate (party)	Raised	Spent	Cash on hand
Erik Paulsen (R)	$5,778,480	$5,862,137	$283,313
Dean Phillips (DFL)	$6,265,241	$6,223,759	$41,482

===== Outside Spending =====
Candidate (party)	Supported	Opposed
Erik Paulsen (R)	$803,622	$4,562,336
Dean Phillips (DFL)	$1,339,786	$3,091,511

== District 4 ==
2018 Minnesota's 4th congressional district election
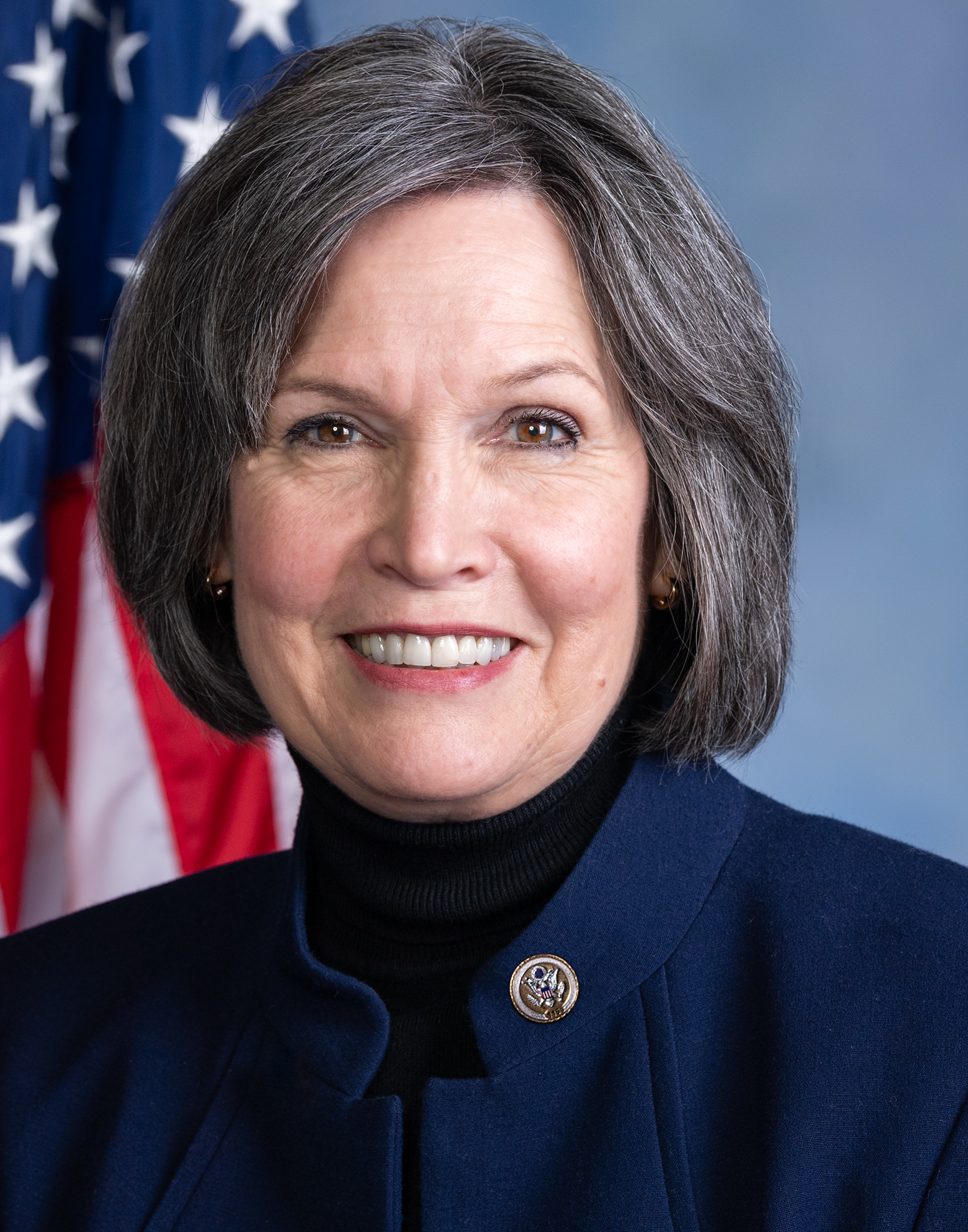

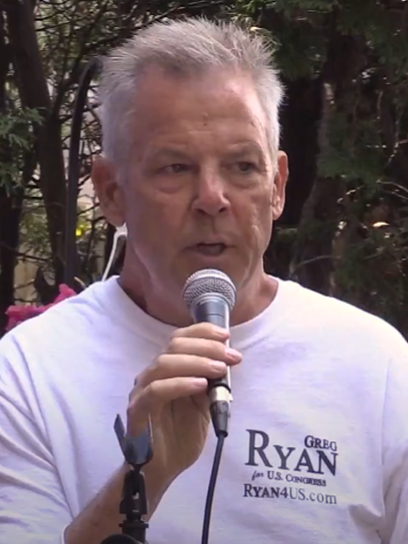
Nominee	Betty McCollum	Greg Ryan
Party	Democratic (DFL)	Republican
Popular vote	216,866	97,746
Percentage	66.0%	29.7%
- Precinct results McCollum: 40–50% 50–60% 60–70% 70–80% 80–90% Ryan: 40–50% 50–60% No votes
U.S. Representative before election
Betty McCollum
Democratic (DFL)
Elected U.S. Representative
Betty McCollum
Democratic (DFL)

Incumbent Democrat Betty McCollum, who had represented the district since 2001, ran for re-election. She was re-elected with 58% of the vote in 2016. The district had a PVI of D+14.

=== Democratic primary ===
==== Candidates ====
===== Nominee =====
- Betty McCollum, incumbent U.S. Representative

===== Eliminated in primary =====
- Muad Hassan
- Reid Rossell, oak craftsperson

===== Withdrawn =====
- Fasil Moghul, landlord

==== Primary results ====
Democratic primary results
Party	Candidate	Votes	%
Democratic (DFL)	Betty McCollum (incumbent)	86,843	91.0
Democratic (DFL)	Muad Hassan	5,398	5.7
Democratic (DFL)	Reid Rossell	3,156	3.3
Total votes		95,397	100.0

=== Republican primary ===
==== Candidates ====
===== Nominee =====
- Greg Ryan, businessman and nominee for this seat in 2016

==== Primary results ====
Republican primary results
Party	Candidate	Votes	%
Republican	Greg Ryan	23,021	100.0
Total votes		23,021	100.0

=== Legal Marijuana Now ===
==== Candidates ====
===== Nominee =====
- Susan Pendergast Sindt, nominee for this seat in 2016

=== General election ===
==== Endorsements ====
Betty McCollum (DFL)

Labor unions

- Communications Workers of America

==== Predictions ====
Source	Ranking	As of
The Cook Political Report	Safe D	November 5, 2018
Inside Elections	Safe D	November 5, 2018
Sabato's Crystal Ball	Safe D	November 5, 2018
RCP	Safe D	November 5, 2018
Daily Kos	Safe D	November 5, 2018
538	Safe D	November 7, 2018

==== Results ====
Minnesota's 4th congressional district, 2018
Party	Candidate	Votes	%
Democratic (DFL)	Betty McCollum (incumbent)	216,866	66.0
Republican	Greg Ryan	97,746	29.7
Legal Marijuana Now	Susan Sindt	13,777	4.2
Write-in		226	0.1
Majority		119,120	36.2
Total votes		328,615	100.0
Democratic (DFL) hold			

==== Finances ====
===== Campaigns =====
Candidate (party)	Raised	Spent	Cash on hand
Betty McCollum (DFL)	$931,351	$949,724	$106,299
Greg Ryan (R)	$23,621	$20,911	$5,706
Susan Sindt (LM)	Unreported		

===== Outside Spending =====
Candidate (party)	Supported	Opposed
Betty McCollum (DFL)	$9,518	$8,225
Greg Ryan (R)	$5,000	$0
Susan Sindt (LM)	$0	$0

== District 5 ==
2018 Minnesota's 5th congressional district election
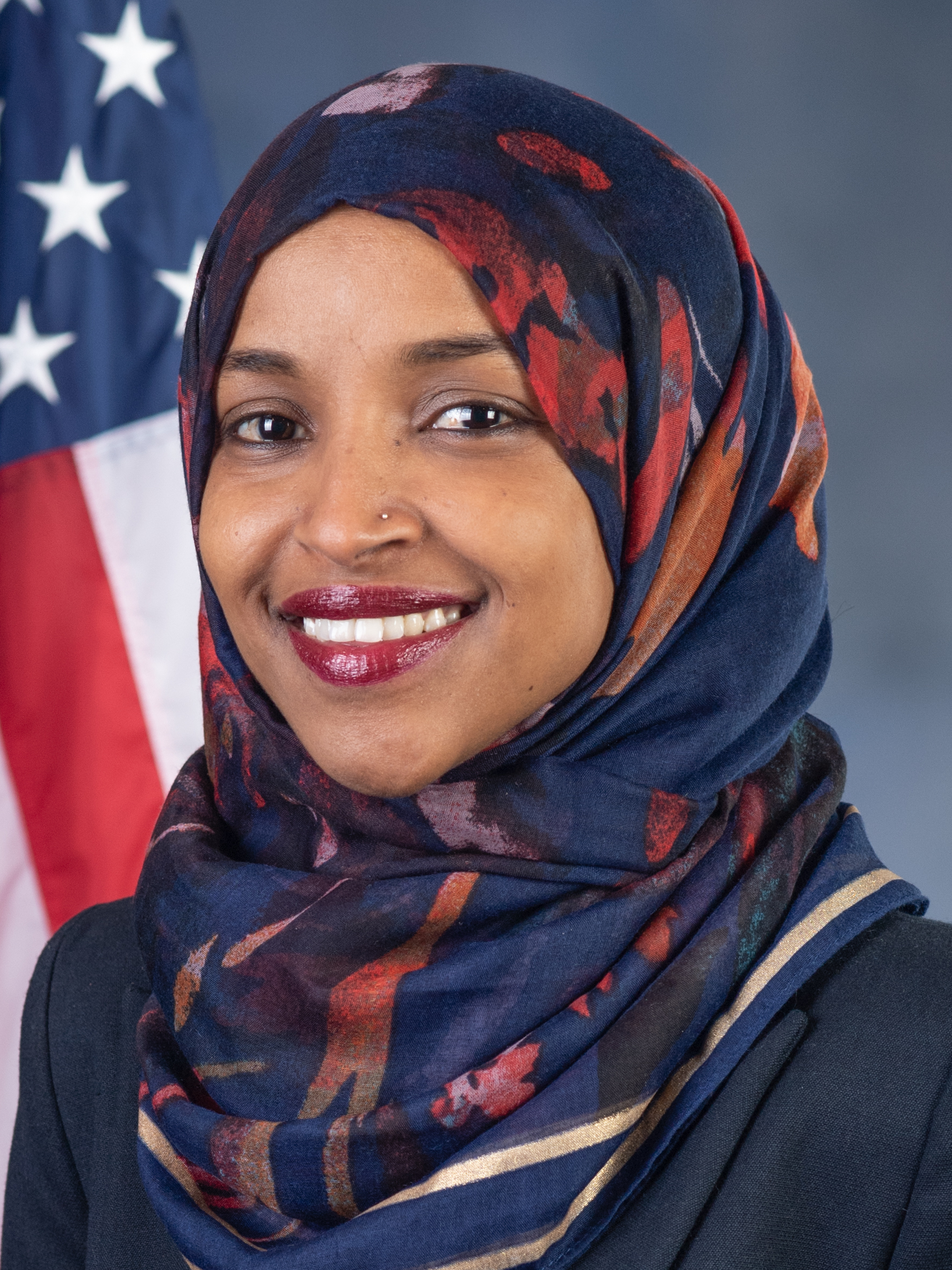

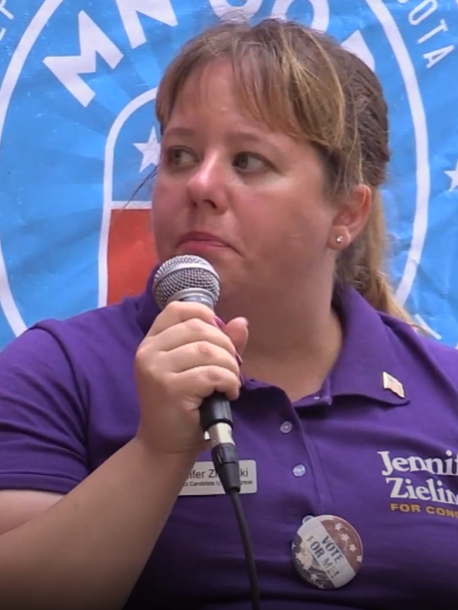
Nominee	Ilhan Omar	Jennifer Zielinski
Party	Democratic (DFL)	Republican
Popular vote	267,703	74,440
Percentage	78.0%	21.7%
- Precinct results Omar: 50–60% 60–70% 70–80% 80–90% >90% No votes
U.S. Representative before election
Keith Ellison
Democratic (DFL)
Elected U.S. Representative
Ilhan Omar
Democratic (DFL)

Incumbent Democrat Keith Ellison, who had represented the district since 2007, decided to not run for re-election, instead seeking the Democratic nomination for the open Attorney General race. He was re-elected with 69% of the vote in 2016. The district had a PVI of D+26.

=== Democratic primary ===
==== Candidates ====
===== Nominee =====
- Ilhan Omar, state representative

===== Eliminated in primary =====
- Jamal Abdi Abdulahi, engineer and chair of the DFL Somali-American Caucus
- Frank Nelson Drake, real estate agent, Republican nominee for this seat in 2016
- Margaret Anderson Kelliher, former speaker of the Minnesota House of Representatives and candidate for governor in 2010
- Patricia Torres Ray, state senator

===== Campaign suspended, still on ballot =====
- Bobby Joe Champion, State Senator

===== Withdrawn =====
- Keith Ellison, incumbent U.S. Representative, running for Attorney General in 2018
- Kim Ellison, Minneapolis School Board member, former spouse of Keith Ellison
- Julie Sabo, former state senator and daughter of former Congressman Martin Olav Sabo

==== Endorsements ====
Ilhan Omar

State officials

- Mark Dayton, governor of Minnesota

State legislators

- Raymond Dehn, state representative
- John Lesch, state representative

Labor unions

- Teamsters Local 120

Organizations

- Center for Popular Democracy
- Democracy for America
- End Citizens United
- Justice Democrats
- Minnesota Democratic-Farmer-Labor Party
- MoveOn.org
- Our Revolution
- People for the American Way
- The People for Bernie Sanders
- Sierra Club

Local officials

- Lisa Bender, Minneapolis City Council president
- Jacob Frey, mayor of Minneapolis

Party officials

- Ken Martin, chairman of the Minnesota Democratic-Farmer-Labor Party

Individuals

- Alicia Garza, cofounder of Black Lives Matter
- Alexandria Ocasio-Cortez, Democratic nominee for New York's 14th congressional district
Margaret Anderson Kelliher

State officials

- Arne Carlson, former Republican governor

State legislators

- Lyndon Carlson, state representative
- Phyllis Kahn, former state representative
- Carolyn Laine, state senator
- Ron Latz, state senator
- Ann Rest, state senator
- Tony Sertich, former state representative
- Linda Slocum, state representative
- Ryan Winkler, former state representative

Local officials

- Mike Opat, Hennepin County commissioner
Patricia Torres Ray

State legislators

- Karen Clark, state representative
- Larry Pogemiller, former Minnesota Senate Majority Leader

==== Primary results ====
Democratic primary results
Party	Candidate	Votes	%
Democratic (DFL)	Ilhan Omar	65,238	48.2
Democratic (DFL)	Margaret Anderson Kelliher	41,156	30.4
Democratic (DFL)	Patricia Torres Ray	17,629	13.0
Democratic (DFL)	Jamal Abdulahi	4,984	3.7
Democratic (DFL)	Bobby Joe Champion	3,831	2.8
Democratic (DFL)	Frank Drake	2,480	1.8
Total votes		135,318	100.0

=== Republican primary ===
==== Candidates ====
===== Nominee =====
- Jennifer Zielinski, health care worker and Republican activist

===== Eliminated in primary =====
- Bob Carney Jr., perennial candidate
- Christopher Chamberlin

==== Primary results ====
Republican primary results
Party	Candidate	Votes	%
Republican	Jennifer Zielinski	8,680	56.5
Republican	Christopher Chamberlin	4,999	32.5
Republican	Bob Carney	1,688	11.0
Total votes		15,367	100.0

=== Green primary ===
==== Candidates ====
===== Nominee =====
- Les Lester, author and teacher (Write-in)

=== General election ===
==== Predictions ====
Source	Ranking	As of
The Cook Political Report	Safe D	November 5, 2018
Inside Elections	Safe D	November 5, 2018
Sabato's Crystal Ball	Safe D	November 5, 2018
RCP	Safe D	November 5, 2018
Daily Kos	Safe D	November 5, 2018
538	Safe D	November 7, 2018

==== Results ====
Minnesota's 5th congressional district, 2018
Party	Candidate	Votes	%
Democratic (DFL)	Ilhan Omar	267,703	78.0
Republican	Jennifer Zielinski	74,440	21.7
Write-in		1,215	0.4
Majority		193,263	56.3
Total votes		343,358	100.0
Democratic (DFL) hold			

==== Finances ====
===== Campaigns =====
Candidate (party)	Raised	Spent	Cash on hand
Ilhan Omar (DFL)	$1,073,813	$1,018,983	$54,829
Jennifer Zielinski (R)	$23,355	$22,755	$600

===== Outside Spending =====
Candidate (party)	Supported	Opposed
Ilhan Omar (DFL)	$31,648	$8,225
Jennifer Zielinski (R)	$8,999	$0

== District 6 ==
2018 Minnesota's 6th congressional district election
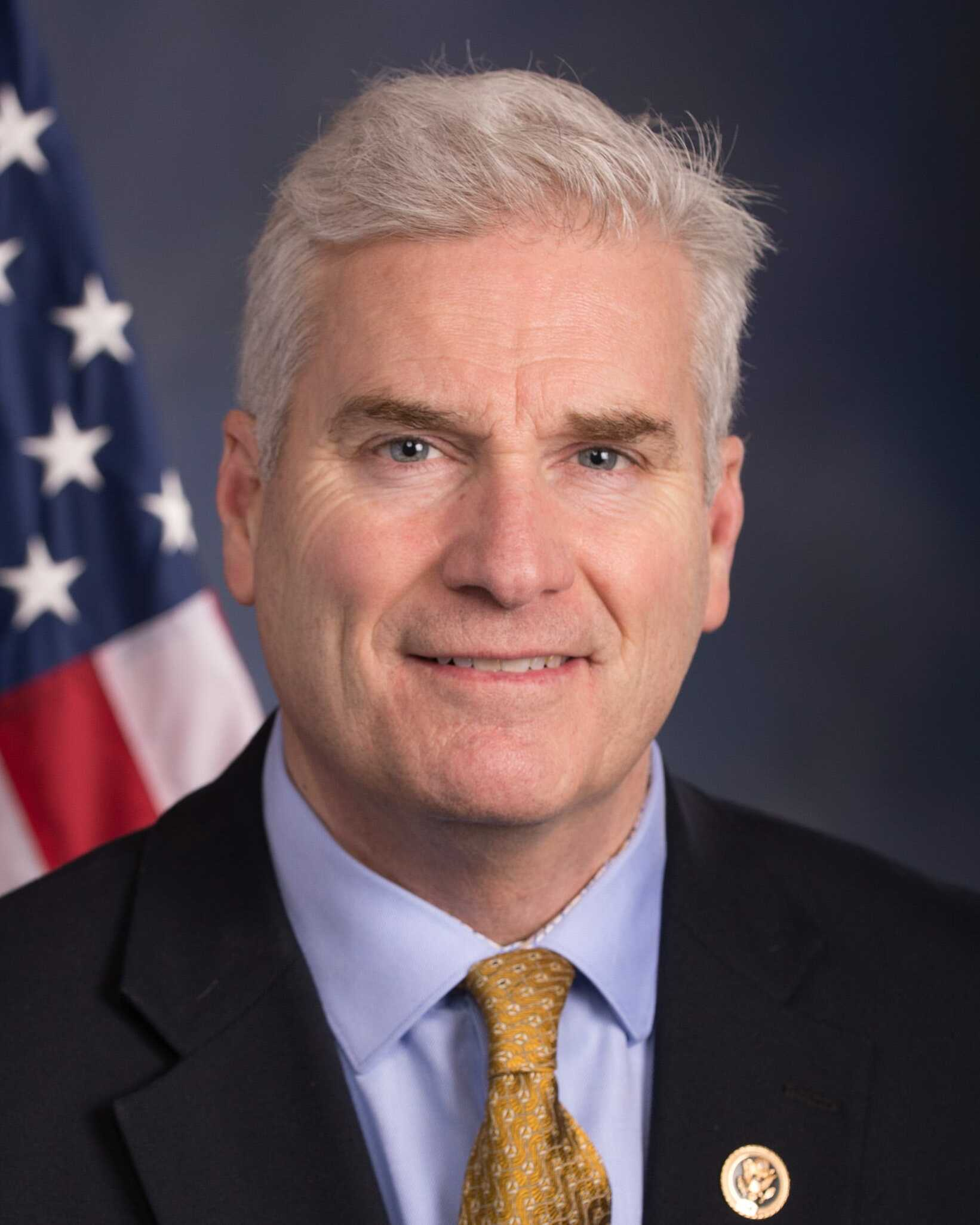

Nominee	Tom Emmer	Ian Todd
Party	Republican	Democratic (DFL)
Popular vote	192,936	122,330
Percentage	61.1%	38.7%
- Precinct results Emmer: 40–50% 50–60% 60–70% 70–80% 80–90% >90% Todd: 40–50% 50–60% 60–70% 70–80% Tie: 40–50% 50% No votes
U.S. Representative before election
Tom Emmer
Republican
Elected U.S. Representative
Tom Emmer
Republican

Incumbent Republican Tom Emmer, who had represented the district since 2015, ran for re-election. He was re-elected with 66% of the vote in 2016. The district had a PVI of R+12 despite narrowly voting for incumbent Democratic senator Amy Klobuchar on the same ballot.

=== Republican primary ===
==== Candidates ====
===== Nominee =====
- Tom Emmer, incumbent U.S. Representative

===== Eliminated in primary =====
- Aliena Kern, small business owner and candidate for this seat in 2016
- Patrick Munro, business owner, candidate for U.S. Senate in 2014 and candidate for this seat in 2016

==== Primary results ====
Republican primary results
Party	Candidate	Votes	%
Republican	Tom Emmer (incumbent)	34,251	76.6
Republican	A.J. Kern	7,897	17.7
Republican	Patrick Munro	2,575	5.8
Total votes		44,723	100.0

=== Democratic primary ===
==== Candidates ====
===== Nominee =====
- Ian Todd, Air Force veteran

==== Primary results ====
Democratic primary results
Party	Candidate	Votes	%
Democratic (DFL)	Ian Todd	33,853	100.0
Total votes		33,853	100.0

=== General election ===
==== Endorsements ====
Tom Emmer (R)

U.S. Executive Branch officials

- Donald Trump, President of the United States

Labor unions

- International Brotherhood of Boilermakers

==== Predictions ====
Source	Ranking	As of
The Cook Political Report	Safe R	November 5, 2018
Inside Elections	Safe R	November 5, 2018
Sabato's Crystal Ball	Safe R	November 5, 2018
RCP	Safe R	November 5, 2018
Daily Kos	Safe R	November 5, 2018
538	Safe R	November 7, 2018

==== Results ====
Minnesota's 6th congressional district, 2018
Party	Candidate	Votes	%
Republican	Tom Emmer (incumbent)	192,936	61.1
Democratic (DFL)	Ian Todd	122,330	38.7
Write-in		463	0.1
Majority		70,606	22.4
Total votes		315,729	100.0
Republican hold			

==== Finances ====
===== Campaigns =====
Candidate (party)	Raised	Spent	Cash on hand
Tom Emmer (R)	$2,203,827	$2,159,206	$182,186
Ian Todd (DFL)	$83,119	$81,577	$1,542

===== Outside Spending =====
Candidate (party)	Supported	Opposed
Tom Emmer (R)	$29,592	$861
Ian Todd (DFL)	$921	$2,500

== District 7 ==
2018 Minnesota's 7th congressional district election
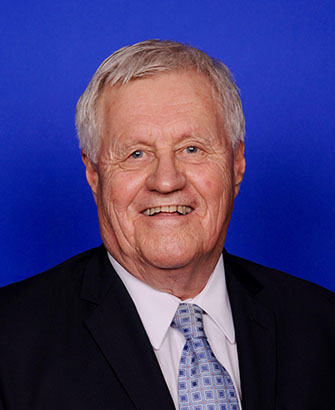

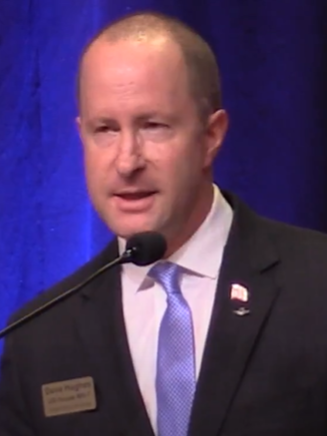
Nominee	Collin Peterson	David Hughes
Party	Democratic (DFL)	Republican
Popular vote	146,665	134,668
Percentage	52.1%	47.8%
- Peterson: 50–60% 60–70% 70–80% 80–90% >90% Hughes: 40–50% 50–60% 60–70% 70–80% 80–90% >90% Tie: 40–50% 50% No votes
U.S. Representative before election
Collin Peterson
Democratic (DFL)
Elected U.S. Representative
Collin Peterson
Democratic (DFL)

Incumbent Democrat Collin Peterson, who had represented the district since 1991, ran for re-election. He was re-elected with 52% of the vote in 2016. The district had a PVI of R+12.

=== Democratic primary ===
==== Candidates ====
===== Nominee =====
- Collin Peterson, incumbent U.S. Representative

==== Primary results ====
Democratic primary results
Party	Candidate	Votes	%
Democratic (DFL)	Collin Peterson (incumbent)	39,961	100.0
Total votes		39,961	100.0

=== Republican primary ===
==== Candidates ====
===== Nominee =====
- Dave Hughes, U.S. Air Force veteran and nominee for this seat in 2016

===== Eliminated in primary =====
- Matt Prosch

===== Withdrawn =====
- Amanda Lynn Hinson, entrepreneur, writer, former pastor and candidate for this seat in 2016
- Tim Miller, state representative

==== Primary results ====
Republican primary results
Party	Candidate	Votes	%
Republican	Dave Hughes	30,786	72.6
Republican	Matt Prosch	11,618	27.4
Total votes		42,404	100.0

=== General election ===
==== Endorsements ====
Collin Peterson (DFL)

Labor unions

- Communications Workers of America
- International Brotherhood of Boilermakers

Organizations

- NRA Political Victory Fund
Dave Hughes (R)

U.S. Executive Branch officials

- Donald Trump, U.S. president

==== Debate ====
2018 Minnesota's 7th congressional district debate
No.	Date	Host	Moderator	Link	Democratic	Republican
Key: P Participant A Absent N Not invited I Invited W Withdrawn						
Key: P Participant A Absent N Not invited I Invited W Withdrawn					Collin Peterson	Dave Hughes
1	Oct. 19, 2018	Prairie Public Television	Matt Olien		P	P

==== Polling ====
Poll source	Date(s) administered	Sample size	Margin of error	Collin Peterson (DFL)	Dave Hughes (R)	Undecided
ALG Research (D-Peterson)	September 5–10, 2018	500 (LV)	±4.4%	53%	35%	–

==== Predictions ====
Source	Ranking	As of
The Cook Political Report	Likely D	November 5, 2018
Inside Elections	Safe D	November 5, 2018
Sabato's Crystal Ball	Likely D	November 5, 2018
RCP	Tossup	November 5, 2018
Daily Kos	Likely D	November 5, 2018
538	Likely D	November 7, 2018

==== Results ====
Minnesota's 7th congressional district, 2018
Party	Candidate	Votes	%
Democratic (DFL)	Collin Peterson (incumbent)	146,672	52.1
Republican	Dave Hughes	134,668	47.8
Write-in		169	0.1
Majority		12,004	4.3
Total votes		281,509	100.0
Democratic (DFL) hold			

==== Finances ====
===== Campaigns =====
Candidate (party)	Raised	Spent	Cash on hand
Collin Peterson (DFL)	$1,425,449	$1,494,741	$500,376
Dave Hughes (R)	$232,724	$229,418	$3,578

===== Outside Spending =====
Candidate (party)	Supported	Opposed
Collin Peterson (DFL)	$2,649	$14,644
Dave Hughes (R)	$43,000	$0

== District 8 ==
2018 Minnesota's 8th congressional district election
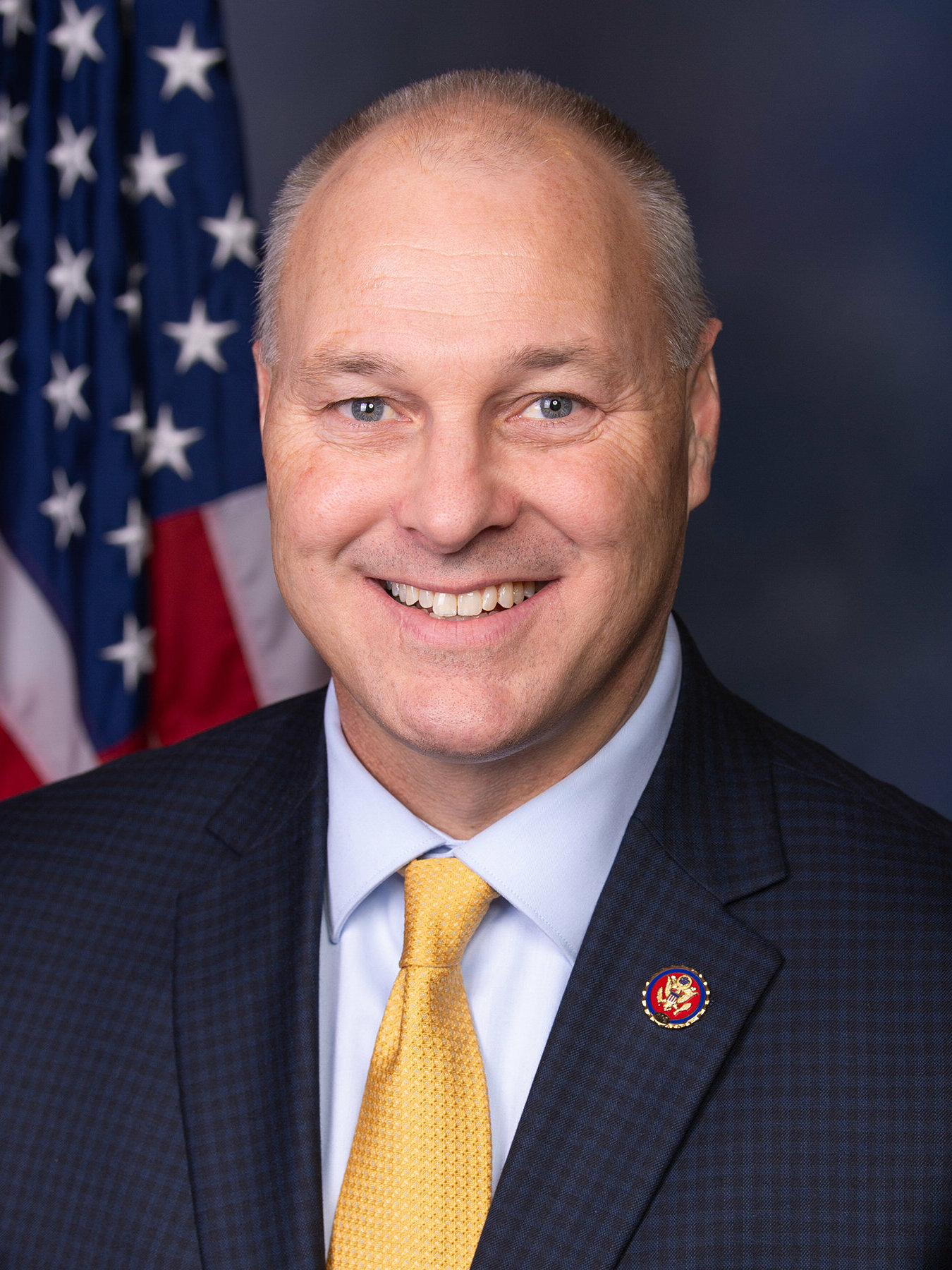

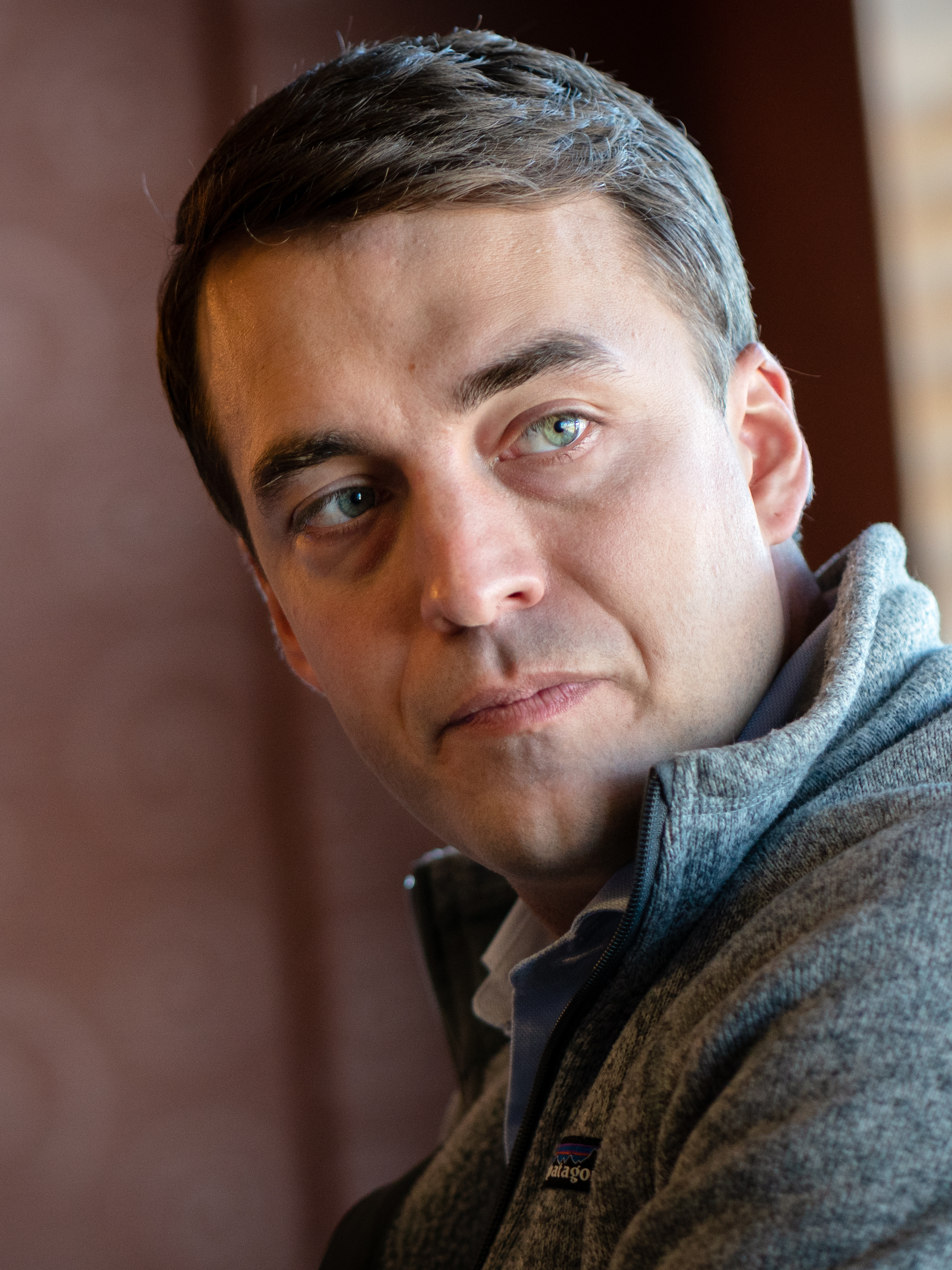
Nominee	Pete Stauber	Joe Radinovich
Party	Republican	Democratic (DFL)
Popular vote	159,364	141,948
Percentage	50.7%	45.2%
- Stauber: 40–50% 50–60% 60–70% 70–80% 80–90% >90% Radinovich: 40–50% 50–60% 60–70% 70–80% 80–90% >90% Tie: 40–50% 50% No votes
U.S. Representative before election
Rick Nolan
Democratic (DFL)
Elected U.S. Representative
Peter Stauber
Republican

Incumbent Democrat Rick Nolan, who had represented the district since 2013 and previously represented Minnesota's 6th district from 1975 to 1981, decided to run for Lieutenant Governor of Minnesota instead of running for re-election. He was re-elected with 50% of the vote in 2016. The district had a PVI of R+4.

=== Democratic primary ===
==== Candidates ====
===== Nominee =====
- Joe Radinovich, former state representative

===== Eliminated in primary =====
- Kirsten Kennedy, mayor of North Branch
- Michelle D. Lee, former Duluth news anchor
- Jason Metsa, state representative
- Soren Christian Sorensen, liberal activist

===== Withdrawn =====
- Rick Nolan, incumbent U.S. Representative (running for Lieutenant Governor)
- Leah Phifer, former ICE agent and FBI analyst

===== Declined =====
- Susan Hakes, Cook County Commissioner

==== Endorsements ====
Michelle Lee

State officials

- Yvonne Prettner Solon, former lieutenant governor of Minnesota
Jason Metsa

Labor unions

- International Brotherhood of Boilermakers, Iron Ship Builders, Blacksmiths, Forgers and Helpers Local 647
- International Brotherhood of Electrical Workers Local 294
- United Food and Commercial Workers Local 1189
- United Steelworkers District 11
Joe Radinovich

U.S. Representatives

- Rick Nolan, U.S. Representative (DFL-MN)

Labor unions

- American Federation of Government Employees District 8
- International Brotherhood of Electrical Workers Local 242

Organizations

- End Citizens United

Newspapers

- Duluth News Tribune

==== Primary results ====
Democratic primary results
Party	Candidate	Votes	%
Democratic (DFL)	Joe Radinovich	30,391	44.2
Democratic (DFL)	Michelle Lee	18,940	27.5
Democratic (DFL)	Jason Metsa	9,009	13.1
Democratic (DFL)	Kirsten Kennedy	8,064	11.7
Democratic (DFL)	Soren Sorensen	2,396	3.5
Total votes		68,800	100.0

=== Republican primary ===
==== Candidates ====
===== Nominee =====
- Pete Stauber, St. Louis County commissioner, and former professional hockey player

===== Eliminated in primary =====
- Harry Welty, former Duluth School Board member and perennial candidate

===== Declined =====
- Stewart Mills III, Mills Fleet Farm executive and nominee for this seat in 2014 & 2016

==== Endorsements ====
Pete Stauber

U.S. Executive Branch officials

- Mike Pence, vice president
- Donald Trump, president

U.S. Senators

- Rudy Boschwitz, former U.S. Senator

U.S. Representatives

- Don Bacon, U.S. Representative (R-NE)
- Chip Cravaack, former U.S. Representative (R-MN)
- Tom Emmer, U.S. Representative (R-MN)
- John Kline, former U.S. Representative (R-MN)
- Patrick McHenry, U.S. Representative (R-NC)

State senators

- Michelle Benson
- Justin Eichorn
- Paul Gazelka, Majority Leader
- Karin Housley
- Mark Koran
- Andrew Mathews
- Carrie Ruud
- Paul Utke

State representatives

- Matt Bliss

Organizations

- Minnesota Citizens Concerned for Life
- National Federation of Independent Business
- U.S. Chamber of Commerce

Newspapers

- Duluth News Tribune
- Mesabi Daily News

==== Primary results ====
Republican primary results
Party	Candidate	Votes	%
Republican	Pete Stauber	44,814	89.9
Republican	Harry Welty	5,021	10.1
Total votes		49,835	100.0

=== Independence ===
==== Candidates ====
===== Nominee =====
- Ray "Skip" Sandman, retired corrections officer and Green nominee for this seat in 2014

=== General election ===
==== Endorsements ====
Joe Radinovich (DFL)

U.S. Representatives

- Rick Nolan, U.S. Representative (DFL-MN)

Labor unions

- American Federation of Government Employees
- International Brotherhood of Boilermakers
- International Brotherhood of Electrical Workers

Organizations

- Democratic Congressional Campaign Committee "Red to Blue" Program
- End Citizens United
Pete Stauber (R)

U.S. Executive Branch officials

- Mike Pence, vice president
- Donald Trump, president

U.S. Senators

- Rudy Boschwitz, former U.S. Senator

U.S. Representatives

- Don Bacon, U.S. Representative (R-NE)
- Chip Cravaack, former U.S. Representative (R-MN)
- Tom Emmer, U.S. Representative (R-MN)
- John Kline, former U.S. Representative (R-MN)
- Patrick McHenry, U.S. Representative (R-NC)

State senators

- Michelle Benson
- Justin Eichorn
- Paul Gazelka, Majority Leader
- Karin Housley
- Mark Koran
- Andrew Mathews
- Carrie Ruud
- Paul Utke

State representatives

- Matt Bliss

Organizations

- Minnesota Citizens Concerned for Life
- National Federation of Independent Business
- National Republican Congressional Committee "Young Guns" Program
- National Right to Life
- U.S. Chamber of Commerce

Newspapers

- Duluth News Tribune
- Star Tribune

==== Debate ====
2018 Minnesota's 8th congressional district debate
No.	Date	Host	Moderator	Link	Democratic	Republican
Key: P Participant A Absent N Not invited I Invited W Withdrawn						
Key: P Participant A Absent N Not invited I Invited W Withdrawn					Joe Radinovich	Pete Stauber
1	Oct. 26, 2018	Minnesota Public Radio	Mike Mulcahy		P	P

==== Polling ====
Poll source	Date(s) administered	Sample size	Margin of error	Joe Radinovich (DFL)	Pete Stauber (R)	Ray Sandman (I)	Undecided
NYT Upshot/Siena College	October 11–14, 2018	507 (LV)	±4.6%	34%	49%	4%	13%
Victoria Research (D-Radinovich)	September 27–30, 2018	400 (LV)	±4.9%	45%	44%	–	11%
NYT Upshot/Siena College	September 6–9, 2018	504 (LV)	±4.6%	44%	43%	–	13%

==== Predictions ====
Source	Ranking	As of
The Cook Political Report	Lean R (flip)	November 5, 2018
Inside Elections	Lean R (flip)	November 5, 2018
Sabato's Crystal Ball	Lean R (flip)	November 5, 2018
RCP	Lean R (flip)	November 5, 2018
Daily Kos	Lean R (flip)	November 5, 2018
538	Likely R (flip)	November 7, 2018

==== Results ====
Stauber defeated Radinovich in the general election.

Minnesota's 8th congressional district, 2018
Party	Candidate	Votes	%
Republican	Pete Stauber	159,364	50.7
Democratic (DFL)	Joe Radinovich	141,948	45.2
Independence	Ray "Skip" Sandman	12,741	4.1
Write-in		156	0.0
Majority		17,416	5.5
Total votes		314,209	100.0
Republican gain from Democratic (DFL)			

==== Finances ====
===== Campaigns =====
Candidate (party)	Raised	Spent	Cash on hand
Joe Radinovich (DFL)	$2,403,251	$2,361,547	$41,704
Pete Stauber (R)	$1,749,583	$1,731,247	$18,336
Ray Sandman (I)	$20,291	$21,694	$0

===== Outside Spending =====
Candidate (party)	Supported	Opposed
Joe Radinovich (DFL)	$1,286,456	$7,164,822
Pete Stauber (R)	$409,520	$920,137
Ray Sandman (I)	$0	$0

== See also ==
- 2018 Minnesota elections

== Notes ==
Official campaign websites

District 1

- Dan Feehan (DFL) for Congress
- Jim Hagedorn (R) for Congress

District 2

- Jason Lewis (R) for Congress
- Angie Craig (DFL) for Congress

District 3

- Erik Paulsen (R) for Congress
- Dean Phillips (DFL) for Congress

District 4

- Betty McCollum (DFL) for Congress
- Greg Ryan (R) for Congress

District 5

- Ilhan Omar (DFL) for Congress
- Jennifer Zielinski (R) for Congress

District 6

- Tom Emmer (R) for Congress
- Ian Todd (DFL) for Congress

District 7

- Collin Peterson (DFL) for Congress
- Dave Hughes (R) for Congress

District 8

- Joe Radinovich (DFL) for Congress
- Pete Stauber (R) for Congress
- Ray "Skip" Sandman (I) for Congress
