= Mecklenburg (disambiguation) =

Mecklenburg is a region in northern Germany, once a state of the Holy Roman Empire.

Mecklenburg may also refer to:

== Geography ==
=== Germany ===
- Mecklenburg-Vorpommern, a German state
- Mecklenburg Lake District
- Dorf Mecklenburg, a village

==== Historical ====
- Grand Duchy of Mecklenburg-Schwerin, a former German Grand Duchy
- Grand Duchy of Mecklenburg-Strelitz, a former Grand Duchy
- Mecklenburg-Güstrow, a former duchy
- Free State of Mecklenburg-Schwerin
- Free State of Mecklenburg-Strelitz
- State of Mecklenburg, a subdivision of the Soviet occupation zone (1945–1949) and the German Democratic Republic (1949–1952)
- Mecklenburg Castle

=== United States ===
- Mecklenburg County, North Carolina
- Mecklenburg County, Virginia

=== Canada ===
- Mecklenburg District as it was known 1788–1792, renamed to "Midland District" in 1792 and abolished 1849

== People ==
- House of Mecklenburg
- Mecklenburg (Dano-Norwegian family)
- Charlotte of Mecklenburg-Strelitz, former Queen Consort of the Kingdom of Great Britain, and later the United Kingdom of Great Britain and Ireland
- Fred Mecklenburg, American physician and anti-abortion activist
- Karl Mecklenburg, American Football player
- Lucy Mecklenburgh, former star of The Only Way Is Essex
- Marjory Mecklenburg, American government administrator and anti-abortion activist

== Ships ==
- SMS Mecklenburg, an early 20th century ship of the Kaiserliche Marine
- HMS Mecklenburgh, an eighteenth century ship of the Royal Navy

== See also ==
- Mecklenburg Resolves
- Meck (disambiguation)
- Mecklenburger, a horse breed
