= Meck =

Meck may refer to:

- Model Engineering College-Kochi, a premier engineering institute in India
- Meck (musician)
- Meck Island
- von Meck, a surname (and list of people with that name)
- Meck, a character in Berlin Alexanderplatz
- Janice Meck, NASA space physiologist

== See also ==
- Mecklenburg (disambiguation)
- Mech (disambiguation)
- Mec (disambiguation)
- Mek (disambiguation)
