= Yelle (surname) =

Yelle is a surname. Notable people with the surname include:

- Archie Yelle (1892–1983), American baseball player
- Cindy Yelle (Cindy Õunpuu, born 1966), Canadian-Estonian swimmer
- Emile Yelle (1893–1947), Canadian Roman Catholic archbishop
- Janice M. Yelle (Janice Meck, born 1948), American space physiologist
- Noémie Yelle (born 1983), Canadian actress
- Paul Yelle (born 1964), Barbadian swimmer
- Stéphane Yelle (born 1974), Canadian ice hockey player
