= MCCL =

MCCL may refer to:

- The year 1250
- Middlesex County Cricket League
- Minnesota Citizens Concerned for Life
