= Von Meck =

von Meck is a surname. Notable people with the surname include:

- Anoeschka von Meck, Namibian author
- Karl Otto Georg von Meck, German businessman
- Nadezhda von Meck, Russian businesswoman and Tchaikovsky's patron
- Nikolai von Meck (1863-1929), son of Nadezhda and Karl Otto Georg von Meck

== See also ==
- Meck (disambiguation)
