= Almanac (American TV series) =

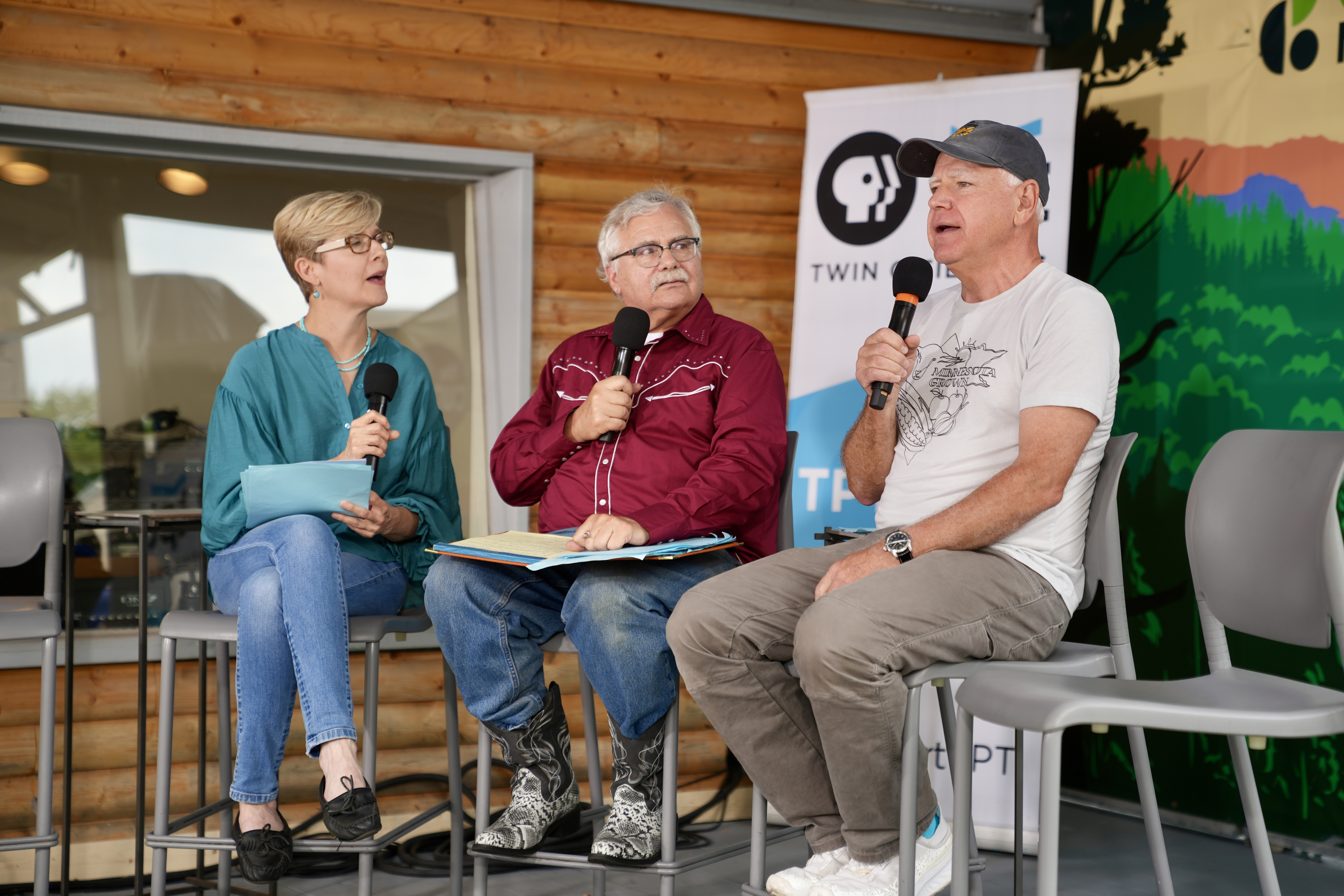
- A live taping of the show at the 2025 Minnesota State Fair
- Genre: Public affairs
- Presented by: Eric Eskola; Cathy Wurzer
- Theme music composer: Dave Grusin
- Opening theme: "Anthem Internationale"
- Country of origin: United States
- Original language: English

Production
- Producer: Brendan Henehan
- Production locations: 172 East 4th Street; Saint Paul, Minnesota
- Editor: Jerry Lakso
- Camera setup: Multiple-camera
- Running time: 56–57 minutes
- Production company: Twin Cities Public Television

Original release
- Release: December 7, 1984 – present

Related
- Almanac: At the Capitol

Almanac is a weekly public affairs television program produced by Twin Cities Public Television (TPT) in Saint Paul, Minnesota, and distributed to other channels around the state via the Minnesota Public Television Association. It has aired weekly on Friday nights since December 7, 1984.

== Format ==
A 90-second monologue, typically by a local humorist, was originally presented near the beginning of each edition of the show. It now occurs in the middle of the program. Some monologists who have made many appearances include Dr. Mark DePaolis, James Lileks, Jim Ragsdale, Dominic Papatola, Roy Finden, Kevyn Berger, Carol Falkowski, and J.G. Preston (an employee of the show until his departure in 2005).

Members of the leadership in the Minnesota House of Representatives and Minnesota Senate frequently appear during their tenures. Guest political analysts include educators, lobbyists, and former legislators. Frequent panelists of recent years include David Strom from the Minnesota Free Market Institute, former Minnesota State Senator Fritz Knaak, Republican lobbyist Sarah Janecek, former press secretary for former U.S. senator Norm Coleman Andy Brehm, DFL lobbyist-turned-educator Wy Spano, former DFL legislator Ember Reichgott Junge, and University of Minnesota professors Hy Berman (history), Kathryn Pearson, and Larry Jacobs (political science).

The end of the show features an "Index File" trivia question, though it sometimes gets cut if the show runs long. Credits run over show-ending music, sometimes live but often pulled from TPT's library of musical recordings dating back to the 1970s.

A live broadcast to celebrate the series's 20th anniversary in April 2005 was transmitted in HDTV. TPT claimed it was the first live high-definition broadcast in the area.

Since the show's inception, its theme song has been "Anthem Internationale" from Dave Grusin's 1982 album Out of the Shadows.

== Presenters ==
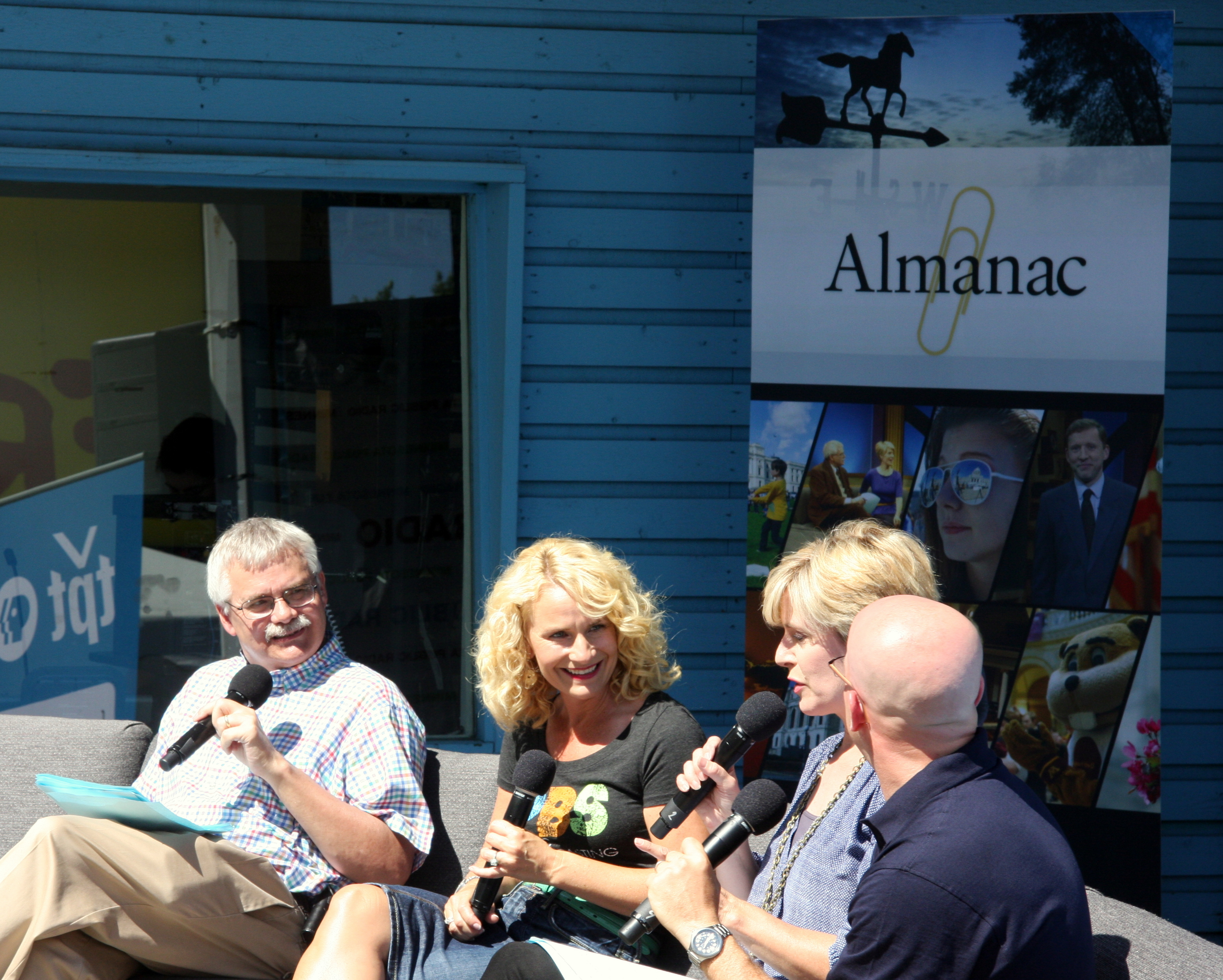
Almanac taping at the 2013 Minnesota State Fair

Longtime hosts Eric Eskola and Cathy Wurzer were married for many years, but have divorced. They have also spent time at other area stations: Eskola contributed political reports to WCCO radio until being laid off in May 2010, and Wurzer hosts the regional portion of Morning Edition at Minnesota Public Radio. Eskola is noted for his fondness for scarves, wearing a different one each week during the cold months.

Mary Lahammer provides political reports from the Minnesota State Capitol when the legislature is in session. David Gillette creates illustrated essays and hosts Almanac's online bonus show, "The Wrap." Lahammer and Gillette also appear on Almanac: At the Capitol during the legislative session.

== See also ==
- Twin Cities Public Television
