= Out of the Shadows (Dave Grusin album) =

Studio album by Dave Grusin
- Released: 1982
- Recorded: 1982
- Studio: A&R Recording (New York City, New York)
- Genre: Jazz
- Length: 43:18
- Label: GRP
- Producer: Dave Grusin; Larry Rosen

Dave Grusin chronology
| Dave Grusin Presents the GRP All-Stars Live in Japan (1980) | Out of the Shadows (1982) | Night Lines (1983) |

Out of the Shadows is an album by American pianist Dave Grusin. The album consists mostly of original, pop-influenced jazz compositions. Released by Arista and Grusin's own GRP Records in 1982, it experienced favorable critical reception and became a commercial success, spawning the single "She Could Be Mine" and becoming one of his highest-charting albums when it peaked at number four on Billboard's Contemporary Jazz Albums chart and number 88 on the all-genre Billboard 200. It continues to be retrospectively well regarded by critics.

== Background and release ==
The majority of the eight-song album consists of original compositions by Grusin, as well as a rendition of the Gerry Mulligan song "Five Brothers". The record incorporates elements of jazz and pop, and has been considered to bear influence from the Frank Mills piece "Music Box Dancer". It was released in 1982 by GRP Records. It was released as a compact disc in 1990. The track "She Could Be Mine", produced by Grusin and Larry Rosen, was released as a single in August 1982, by Arista; the single edit was three minutes and forty-six seconds long. It was also later featured as the opening track on his 1988 greatest hits compilation, Collection.

== Reception ==
Professional ratings
Review scores
| Source | Rating |
|---|---|
| AllMusic | 3/5 stars |
| Billboard | Top Album Pick |
| Encyclopedia of Popular Music | 3/4 stars |
| Virgin Encyclopedia of Jazz | 3/4 stars |

An album review in the September 18, 1982, issue of Billboard remarked that the album was "not for the serious jazz fan", but suggested that pop fans would enjoy it, going on to call him the "Frank Mills of the jazz world". The album was also designated as a "Top Album Pick" for the week. The single "She Could be Mine" was highlighted as a "selected" pop single in the August 28, 1982, issue of Billboard. Retrospectively, the album holds a score of three out of five stars from Allmusic, and three out of four stars in both the Encyclopedia of Popular Music and the Virgin Encyclopedia of Jazz.

Upon its release, the album became Grusin's second-highest-peaking (at the time) entry on the Billboard 200 albums chart, where it peaked at number 88 on the chart dated September 4, 1982. It spent a total of nine weeks on the tally. It also peaked at number 4 on the Billboard Jazz Albums chart, becoming his second top-five entry after Mountain Dance peaked at number 3 in 1981. The track "Anthem Internationale" is used as the theme song for the Minnesota PBS public affairs program Almanac.

== Track listing ==
Side A

1. "Last Train to Paradiso" (Dave Grusin) - 5:13
2. "She Could Be Mine" (Don Grusin) - 5:16
3. "Crystal Morning" (Lee Ritenour) - 5:47
4. "Five Brothers" (Gerry Mulligan) - 6:02

Side B

1. "Anthem Internationale" (Dave Grusin) - 6:58 (Album version), 4:12 (Single version)
2. "Serengeti Walk" (Dave Grusin, Harvey Mason, Louis Johnson) - 6:49
3. "Hokkaido" (Dave Grusin) - 1:59
4. "Sweetwater Nights" (Dave Grusin) - 5:14

== Personnel ==
- Dave Grusin – Fender Rhodes, acoustic piano, Oberheim OB-X synthesizer
- Don Grusin – Oberheim OB-X synthesizer
- Lee Ritenour – acoustic guitars, electric guitars
- Lincoln Goines – electric bass, electric upright bass
- Steve Gadd – drums
- Rubens Bassini – percussion

=== Production ===
- Akira Taguchi – executive producer
- Dave Grusin – producer, arrangements, digital mixing
- Larry Rosen – producer, recording, digital mixing
- Ollie Cotton – recording assistant, mix assistant
- Ted Jensen – mastering at Sterling Sound (New York, NY)
- Frank Dickinson – digital equipment
- Peter Lopez – GRP production coordinator
- Takashi Misu – JVC production coordinator
- Daverhone, Inc. – design
- Tom Biondo – photography
- Lisa Daurio – stylist
- Webster McKnight – hair stylist

CD credits

- Ted Jensen – digital remastering
- Josiah Gluck – production supervisor
- Andy Baltimore – creative director, package design
- Addi B. Dayan – package design

== Charts ==
| Chart (1980) | Peak position |
|---|---|
| US Billboard 200 | 88 |
| US Jazz Albums (Billboard) | 4 |
