= Marjory Mecklenburg =

American government administrator (born 1935)

Marjory E. Malo Mecklenburg (born 1935) is an American government administrator. She has served as an advisor for the Office of Technology Assessment and was appointed by Ronald Reagan to the U.S. Department of Health and Human Services, serving in the Office of Adolescent Pregnancy Programs and serving as Director of the Office of Population Affairs until 1985.

She and her husband Fred Mecklenburg are prominent activists in opposition to legal abortion. She is a founder of the Minnesota Citizens Concerned for Life, American Citizens Concerned for Life, and has served as a leader of the National Right to Life Committee.

== Life and career ==
Marjory Malo grew up in Inver Grove Heights, Minnesota, and she and her future husband were high school debating partners before marriage. She and her husband have four children, one of whom is Karl Mecklenburg, a former American football player for the Denver Broncos.

Mecklenburg was appointed by Ronald Reagan to the Office of Adolescent Pregnancy Programs at the U.S. Department of Health and Human Services. She had previously served on an advisory panel for the Office of Technology Assessment investigating fertility planning technologies. Mecklenburg's tenure at the Office of Adolescent Pregnancy Programs focused on issues related to teenage pregnancy, where she specifically proposed Reagan administration policies requiring parental consent for minors seeking birth control.

She later became Director of the Office of Population Affairs. While there she came under scrutiny for using government funds to travel to see her son’s Denver Bronco games. She resigned in 1985.

=== Opposition to abortion ===
Mecklenburg and her husband became involved in the opposition to legal abortion in 1967. Mecklenburg served as president of the pro-life organization Minnesota Citizens Concerned for Life, succeeding her husband in that position.

In the 1980s, Marjory Mecklenburg served as president of the National Right to Life Committee.

== Selected publications and media ==
- Mecklenburg, ME; Thompson, PG (1983). "The Adolescent Family Life Program as a prevention measure". Public Health Rep. 98: 21–9. PMC 1424403. PMID 6687497.
- Marjory Mecklenburg; Judith P Fink; ACCL Education Fund. All about families : research in progress on education for parenthood, abortion, family planning, and population control. Minneapolis : American Citizens Concerned for Life, Education Fund, ©1975
- Glen O Jenson; Orrin Hatch; Louis Harris; Martha Kendrick; Richard M Eyre; Marjory Mecklenburg; Mark Cannon; Afesa Bell-Nathaniel (1981). Preparation for marriage and parenthood : who is responsible? Utah State University, Television Services
- Maris Vinovskis Interview with Marjory Mecklenburg; Karen Mulhauser
- Glen O Jenson; Orrin Hatch; Louis Harris; Martha Kendrick; Richard M Eyre; Marjory Mecklenburg; Mark Cannon; Afesa Bell-Nathaniel (1981) Update in quality parenting, 1981, Preparation for marriage and parenthood; no. 10. Utah State University, Television Services, [1981]
