= Dave Grusin and the NY-LA Dream Band =

Live album by Dave Grusin
- Released: 1984
- Recorded: 1983
- Venue: Nippon Budokan, Japan
- Genre: Jazz
- Length: 45:08
- Label: GRP
- Producer: Dave Grusin / Larry Rosen

Dave Grusin chronology
Night Lines (1983)	Dave Grusin and the NY-LA Dream Band (1984)	Harlequin (1985)

Dave Grusin and the NY-LA Dream Band is an album by American pianist Dave Grusin released in 1984, recorded for the GRP label. The album was released in Japan by JVC as Dave Grusin and Dream Orchestra Live at Budokan. The album was recorded live in Tokyo, Japan, at Budokan. The album reached No. 4 on Billboard's Jazz chart.

== Track listing ==
All selections written by Dave Grusin; except where noted

1. "Shuffle City" (Don Grusin) - 4:22
2. "Countdown" (Lee Ritenour) - 8:03
3. "Serengetti Walk" (Dave Grusin, Harvey Mason, Louis Johnson) - 6:18
4. "What Matters Most" (Dave Grusin, Alan Bergman, Marilyn Bergman) - 3:20
5. "Number 8" (Don Grusin) - 4:30
6. "Three Days of the Condor" - 4:43
7. "Summer Sketches" - 14:19

== Personnel ==
Musicians

- Dave Grusin – Fender Rhodes, acoustic piano, Oberheim OB-X, vocoder, arrangements, conductor
- Don Grusin – Yamaha CP-70, clavinet, Fender Rhodes, Oberheim OB-X
- Eric Gale – guitars
- Lee Ritenour – acoustic guitar, guitars, percussion, vocals
- Anthony Jackson – bass guitar, contrabass
- Steve Gadd – drums
- Rubens Bassini – percussion
- George Young – alto saxophone, soprano saxophone, tenor saxophone, flute
- Tiger Okoshi – trumpet, flugelhorn
- The Tokyo Brass Ensemble – brass section
- The NHK Strings – string section
- Andy Marsala – additional arrangements

Production

- Dave Grusin – producer, mixing, liner notes
- Larry Rosen – producer, recording, mixing
- Ollie Cotton – recording, mix assistant
- Larry Gates – recording assistant
- Tamco Remote Truck & Crew – assisting recording gear
- A&R Recording (New York, NY) – mixing location
- Ted Jensen – mastering at Sterling Sound (New York, NY)
- Gus Skinas – digital transferring
- Peter Lopez – GRP production coordination
- Linda Mack – GRP production coordination assistant
- Takashi Misu – JVC production coordination
- Akira Taguchi – JVC production coordination
- Andy Baltimore – art direction
- Bob Heimall – design
- Mo Ström – design
- Yasuhisa Yoneda – album photography
- Joseph Marvullo – inner sleeve photography
- Michael Manoogian – lettering

== Charts ==
Chart (1984)	Peak position
Billboard Jazz Albums	4
