= Night Lines (album) =

Night-Lines

Studio album by Dave Grusin
- Released: 1984
- Recorded: 1983
- Genre: Jazz, synth-pop
- Length: 44:25
- Label: GRP
- Producer: Dave Grusin & Larry Rosen

Dave Grusin chronology
Out of the Shadows (1982)	Night-Lines (1984)	Dave Grusin and the NY-LA Dream Band (1984)

Night-Lines is an album by American pianist Dave Grusin released in 1984, recorded for the GRP label. The album reached No. 4 on Billboard's Contemporary Jazz chart.

The album's cover is from the November 1983 issue of Electronic Fun with Computers & Games.

== Track listing ==
1. "Power Wave" (Don Grusin) - 5:12
2. "Thankful 'n' Thoughtful" (Sylvester Stewart) - 4:12
3. "St. Elsewhere" (theme from the TV show St. Elsewhere) (Dave Grusin) - 4:16
4. "Haunting Me" (Randy Goodrum, Jay Graydon) - 5:07
5. "Secret Place" (Dave Grusin) - 3:36
6. "Night Lines" (Dave Grusin) - 5:06
7. "Tick Tock" (Randy Goodrum) - 4:17
8. "Kitchen Dance" (Dave Grusin) - 4:01
9. "Somewhere Between Old and New York" (Randy Goodrum, Dave Loggins) - 4:35
10. "Bossa Baroque" (Dave Grusin) - 4:20

== Personnel ==
- Dave Grusin – acoustic piano, Rhodes piano, Yamaha GS2, Yamaha DX7, Oberheim OB-Xa, Minimoog, Fairlight synthesizer, LinnDrum programming, percussion
- Ed Walsh – Fairlight synthesizer programming
- David Sanborn – saxophone (2)
- Marcus Miller – electric bass (2, 4, 7)
- Lincoln Goines – fretless bass (9)
- Buddy Williams – Simmons drums (9)
- Rubens Bassini – percussion (10)
- Phoebe Snow – lead and backing vocals (2, 9)
- Gary Roda – backing vocals (2)
- Randy Goodrum – lead and backing vocals (4, 7)

Production

- Dave Grusin – producer, arrangements, mixing
- Larry Rosen – producer, additional recording, mixing
- Josiah Gluck – recording, digital editing
- Ollie Cotton – additional recording, mix assistant
- Ted Jensen – mastering at Sterling Sound (New York, NY)
- Peter Lopez – GRP production coordinator
- Linda M. Mack – production assistant
- Frank Riley – cover illustration
- Andy Baltimore – art direction
- Lee Corey Studios, Inc. – art design

== Charts ==
Chart (1983)	Peak position
Billboard Jazz Albums	4
