= Mech (disambiguation) =

A mech or mecha is a large, pilotable machine.

Mech may also refer to:

- Mech (surname)
- Mech infantry or mechanized infantry
- Mech language or Bodo
- Mech radar, a Russian airborne radar system
- Mech tribe, an ethnic group of India that belongs to the Bodo-Kachari peoples
- Mech, a type of electronic cigarette; see Construction of electronic cigarettes
- Mechanical keyboard
- Morality, Unity, Honour, a Bulgarian political party

== See also ==
- Mecha anime and manga, a genre of anime and manga that features giant robots
- Mechanics
- Mechanism (engineering)
