= Fred Mecklenburg =

American obstetrician-gynecologist

Fred Emil Mecklenburg (1935 - April 6, 2020) was an American obstetrician-gynecologist who had been active in opposition to legal abortion. He was a founder of the Minnesota Citizens Concerned for Life, American Citizens Concerned for Life, and chairman of the National Right to Life Committee from 1973 to 1975.

== Life and career ==
Mecklenburg grew up in Minnesota. His wife, Marjory Mecklenburg grew up in Inver Grove Heights, Minnesota, and they were high school debating partners before marriage. He and his wife have four children, one of whom is Karl Mecklenburg, a former American football player for the Denver Broncos.

Mecklenburg attended University of Minnesota, earning a Bachelor of Science degree in 1957 and an additional degree in 1958. He graduated from the University of Minnesota Medical School in 1960 and was certified in obstetrics and gynaecology in 1968. His residency was interrupted when he served for two years in the United States Army Medical Corps. He served as Director of Family Planning Programs, at University of Minnesota at a time when they opened a clinic off campus for married and unmarried students seeking family planning services.

He had a practice in Edina, Minnesota until relocating to the Washington, D. C. area in 1981, when his wife was appointed by Ronald Reagan to Office of Adolescent Pregnancy Programs at the U.S. Department of Health and Human Services. She had previously served on an advisory panel for the Office of Technology Assessment investigating fertility planning technologies. She later became Director of the Office of Population Affairs where she served until 1985.

Mecklenburg held an OB/GYN position with Kaiser Permanente in Reston, Virginia in the 1980s. Mecklenburg later joined the Inova Fairfax Women's Center in Virginia, and he is currently Chairman of the OB/GYN department.

=== Opposition to abortion ===
Mecklenburg and his wife became involved in the opposition to legal abortion in 1967. Mecklenburg served as president of the pro-life organization Minnesota Citizens Concerned for Life, and his wife succeeded him in that position. Mecklenburg was a strong supporter of Planned Parenthood and urged the antiabortion movement not to object to family planning.

In 1972, he authored a book chapter, "The Indications for Induced Abortion: A Physician's Perspective", which argued in part that pregnancy from rape "is extremely rare." The chapter appeared in a book titled Abortion and Social Justice, written in response to arguments before the Supreme Court regarding legalizing abortion in Roe v. Wade. Mecklenburg added that a woman exposed to the trauma of rape "will not ovulate even if she is 'scheduled' to." Mecklenburg said researchers in Nazi death camps observed this effect by "selecting women who were about to ovulate and sending them to the gas chambers, only to bring them back after their realistic mock-killing, to see what the effect this had on their ovulatory patterns. An extremely high percentage of these women did not ovulate." Journalist Blythe Bernhard stated, "That article has influenced two generations of anti-abortion activists with the hope to build a medical case to ban all abortions without any exception."

In 1975, Mecklenburg testified as an expert witness in a manslaughter prosecution against a Boston obstetrician, and criticized the abortion procedure used by the defendant.

In the 1980s, Marjory Mecklenburg served as president of the National Right to Life Committee.

In 1988, Pennsylvania state Republican representative Stephen Freind, claiming to rely on Mecklenburg, publicly argued that rape prevents pregnancy with the odds of pregnancy being "one in millions and millions and millions." Mecklenburg responded in a prepared statement that he regretted his opinions were used to support Freind's position. In 2012, Mecklenburg's 1972 article was mentioned as a possible source for similar comments made by U.S. Senate candidate Todd Akin.

== Selected publications ==
- Lucas, EW; Branton, P; Mecklenburg, FE; Moawad, GN (August 2009). "Ectopic breast fibroadenoma of the vulva". Obstet Gynecol. 114: 460–2. doi:10.1097/AOG.0b013e3181af672d. PMID 19622961.
- Khoury, AN; Zhou, QP; Gorenberg, DM; Nies, BM; Manley, GE; Mecklenburg, FE (June 2001). "A comparison of intermittent vaginal administration of two different doses of misoprostol suppositories with continuous dinoprostone for cervical ripening and labor induction". J Matern Fetal Med. 10: 186–92. PMID 11444788.
- Park, CH; Ruprai, D; Vandel, NM; Hixon, DL; Mecklenburg, FE (Mar 1996). "Rapid detection of group B streptococcal antigen from vaginal specimens using a new Optical ImmunoAssay technique". Diagn Microbiol Infect Dis. 24 (3): 125–8. PMID 8724397.
- Mecklenburg, FE (February 1973). "Pregnancy: an adolescent crisis". Minn Med. 56: 101–4. PMID 4686201.
