= Cardiac rhythm problems during spaceflight =

Heart rhythm disturbances have been seen among astronauts. Most of these have been related to cardiovascular disease, but it is not clear whether this was due to pre-existing conditions or effects of space flight. It is hoped that advanced screening for coronary disease has greatly mitigated this risk. Other heart rhythm problems, such as atrial fibrillation, can develop over time, necessitating periodic screening of crewmembers’ heart rhythms. Beyond these terrestrial heart risks, some concern exists that prolonged exposure to microgravity may lead to heart rhythm disturbances. Although this has not been observed to date, further surveillance is warranted.

The incidence and clinical significance of cardiac arrhythmias during long-term exposure to microgravity experienced on the International Space Station (ISS) or during a prolonged (that is, up to 3 years) sojourn to Mars or on the Moon are a concern for the National Aeronautics and Space Administration (NASA). At present, there are only anecdotal reports of cardiac arrhythmias in space, including one documented episode of non-sustained ventricular tachycardia. However, the potential catastrophic nature of a sudden cardiac death in the remote, but highly public, environment of space flight has led to continued concern since the early days of the space program over the possibility that space flight might be arrhythmogenic. Indeed, there are known and well-defined changes in the cardiovascular system with space flight:

1. plasma volume is reduced;
2. left ventricular mass in decreased;
3. the autonomic nervous system adapts to the microgravity environment.

Combined, these physiologic adaptations suggest that changes in cardiac structure and neurohumoral environment during space flight could alter electrical conduction, although the evidence supporting this contention consists mostly of minor changes in QT interval in a small number of astronauts after long-duration space flight. Concurrent with efforts by Flight Medicine to improve screening techniques, as NASA enters the era of exploration class missions, it will be critical to determine with the highest degree of certainty whether space flight by itself alters cardiac structure and function sufficiently to increase the risk for arrhythmias. This undertaking must be done in a highly systematic way.

== Introduction ==
At present, there is little evidence suggesting that cardiovascular adaptation to microgravity or space flight increases susceptibility to life-threatening arrhythmias in astronauts. From a clinical perspective, according to the “biological model” of sudden cardiac death, both the substrate and the trigger for arrhythmias should be considered to determine whether long-term space flight could lead to an increased risk of sudden death. In this model, structural abnormalities interact with functional alterations, such as exercise, electrolyte disturbances, or neurohumoral modulation, to create an environment in which arrhythmias can be initiated and/or sustained. In patients with coronary artery disease, the substrate is clear: a myocardial infarction (MI) and/or scar leading to focal areas of slowed conduction, a necessary condition for re-entry. For patients with apparently normal ventricular function, the potential substrate is less certain. In fact, reentry often is not the mechanism of arrhythmia development in these clinical cases: the arrhythmias may be caused by delayed after-depolarizations, and the triggered activity may be mediated via catecholamines. The published report of non-sustained ventricular tachycardia during prolonged space flight supports this hypothesis, in that initiation of tachycardia by a late diastolic premature ventricular contraction (PVC) is more consistent with triggered activity than it is with re-entry.

While there are no definitive data showing that long-duration space flight is associated with cardiac arrhythmias, there are observational data that have been documented over many years that are suggestive of cardiac electrical changes during long flights. For example, during Skylab, all 9 American crewmembers exhibited some form of rhythm disturbance. Most of these rhythm disturbances consisted of single PVCs and were clinically insignificant. However, one crewmember experienced a 5-beat run of ventricular tachycardia during a lower-body negative pressure protocol, and another had periods of “wandering supraventricular pacemaker” during rest and following exercise. More recently, it has been shown that the corrected QT interval (QTc), a marker of ventricular repolarization, was prolonged slightly in a small number of astronauts after long-duration space flight. In-flight Holter monitoring was not performed during these space flights. Thus, it is not known whether this prolongation was associated with any known arrhythmias. In-flight Holter monitoring was undertaken in the early Space Shuttle era.

Virtually no changes in arrhythmias were documented in flights of 4 to 16 days during either intravehicular or extravehicular operations compared to preflight measurements. Indeed, in these studies, the frequency of arrhythmias may actually have been reduced in flight, though the day-to-day variability of these arrhythmias, which is known to be quite wide, was not quantified. However, aboard the Mir space station, PVCs were detected that were not present before flight and a 14-beat run of ventricular tachycardia was documented.

More recently, several conditions that may predispose crewmembers to arrhythmias have been identified. D’Aunno et al. found that after long-duration missions QTc intervals are slightly prolonged in crewmembers who did not have prolonged QTc intervals after their short-duration Space Shuttle flights, and several investigators have found decreases in left ventricular mass following space flight.

All of these findings raise the concern that cardiac rhythm disturbances may become an issue during the long in-flight tours of duty planned for ISS and interplanetary missions. The degree to which space flight and its many variables can be considered arrhythmogenic is not clear, but the possibility that serious cardiac rhythm disturbances might occur during space flight is a concern to NASA.

== Spaceflight evidence ==
There have been no systematic studies of the arrhythmogenic potential of long-duration space flight, and only two studies of short-duration space flight. There have been, however, a number of published reports detailing in-flight arrhythmias. Table 1 includes a summary of some of these reports.

Table 1. Summary of anecdotal reports of cardiac arrhythmias during U.S. human space flight programs.
Program	Launch	Flight	EVA	Re-entry or landing	Post-flight
Mercury	PVCs, PACs	Sinus Dysrhythmia, 1 PVC, 1 PAC, One fusion beat			
Gemini		Rare PACs			
Apollo			Lunar surface: atrial bigeminal rhythm (extreme fatigue), PVCs, PACs		
Skylab		PVCs, AV block, ectopic beats, AV junctional rhythm, ST segment and Twave alterations during max stress, ventricular couplet, 3-beat V-tach			Ventricular Tachycardia
Space Shuttle	PVCs, PACs			PVCs, PACs	
Table adapted from Charles, JB, Frey, MA, Fritsch-Yelle JM, Fortner GW. Chapter 3: Cardiovascular and Cardiorespiratory Function in Space Biology and Medicine. Nicogossian AE, Mohler SR, Gazenko OG, Grigoriev AI, eds. AIIA, Reston VA. 1996. p. 73.

Leguay and Seigneuric also compiled some of the reports from the pre-Shuttle era of crewed space flight. Several of these reports are briefly described below.

One crewmember during Apollo 15 experienced a 22-beat nodal bigeminal rhythm, which was followed by premature atrial beats. This crewmember reported extreme fatigue during the incident, but only when questioned about it by crew surgeons; thus, it was not severe enough to impact the mission. Twenty-one months later the crew member suffered from coronary artery disease and a cardiac infarction without suggestive ECG changes.

In the Skylab missions, several instances of ventricular PVCs, supraventricular PVCs, and nodal arrhythmia were recorded. The arrhythmias occurred during effort tests, extravehicular activities (EVAs), lower body negative pressure sessions, and throughout the entire mission. These included two consecutive PVCs in one astronaut during exercise and an episode of atrioventricular dissociation preceded by sinus bradycardia in two astronauts.

In addition, an isolated incident of a non-sustained 14-beat ventricular tachycardia (Figure 1), with a maximum heart rate of 215 beats per minute, was recorded using in-flight Holter monitoring aboard the Mir. Although not part of a systematic scientific study, this case provides additional evidence of arrhythmias during long-duration space flight.

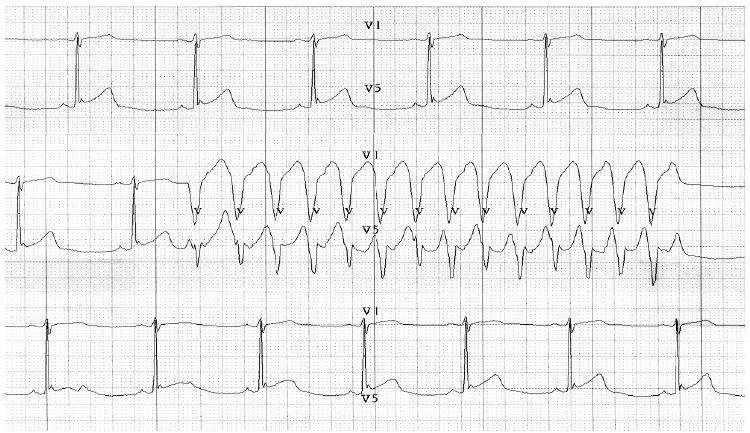
Figure 1. Record of a non-sustained tachycardia from a Mir crewmember.

Systematic studies of cardiac rhythm disturbances have been performed during short-duration space flight. These studies were conducted in response to medical reports of arrhythmias occurring in 9 to 14 Space Shuttle EVA astronauts between 1983 and 1985. Rossum et al. used 24-hour Holter recordings acquired during and after high altitude chamber activity, 30 days before launch, during and after each extravehicular activity performed, and on return to Earth. The investigators observed no change in the number of premature ventricular contractions of premature atrial contractions per hour during flight compared to preflight or postflight (Figure 2). Likewise, arrhythmias were not observed by Fritsch-Yelle et al. in 12 astronauts studied before, during and after 6 Space Shuttle missions. Given the fact that these data disagreed with previous reports, the investigators suggested that further study was required.

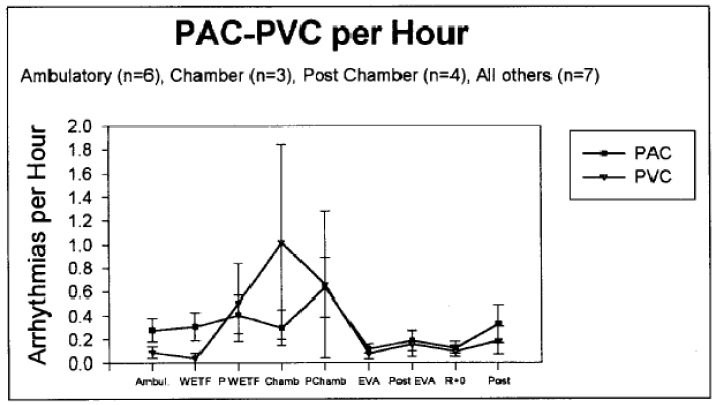
Figure 2. Number of premature ventricular and atrial contractions seen before, during and after space flight.

It is unknown whether long-duration exposure to microgravity itself may precipitate cardiac arrhythmias. Based on observations and clinical judgement, medical operations personnel have suggested that some of these incidents have been related to pre-existing, undiagnosed coronary artery disease. Additional pre-selection crew screening tests, including calcium scoring, have been added to reduce such occurrences in the future.

== Contributing factors ==
=== Left ventricular mass ===
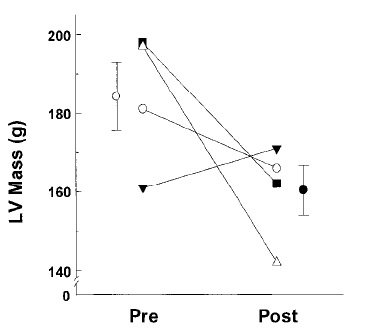
Figure 3. Left ventricular mass before and after space flight. Lines represent individual crew members and circles with error bars represent the mean.

Recent evidence suggests that the development of apoptosis, or “programmed cell death” in response to pathological, physiologic, and/or genetic signals, may be a key developmental factor in causing cardiac arrhythmias. For example, apoptosis associated with atrophy and fibrofatty replacement of right ventricular tissue has been identified as the likely mechanism for arrhythmia development in arrhythmogenic right ventricular dysplasia, a condition that may lead to sudden death in otherwise healthy young individuals.

Two publications have reported decreases in left ventricular mass after short-duration space flight. In one of these publications, cardiac MRI was used and showed a reduction in left ventricular mass on landing day; however, extended recovery data were not obtained (Figure 3). In the other publication, echocardiography was used and showed a similar decrease in mass on landing day with full recovery 3 days after landing.

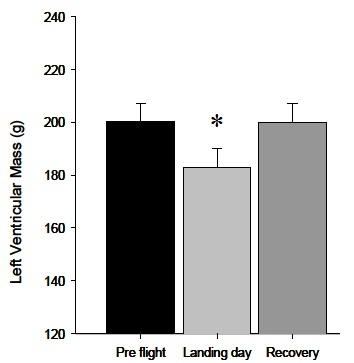
Figure 4. Left ventricular mass before and after short-duration space flight [based on(8), n=38]. * = P ≤ 0.05.

Unpublished data (also measured with ultrasound) show decreases in left ventricular mass after 6-month missions aboard the ISS. These decreases are double those observed after short flights and do not fully recover by the third day after landing (Figure 5).

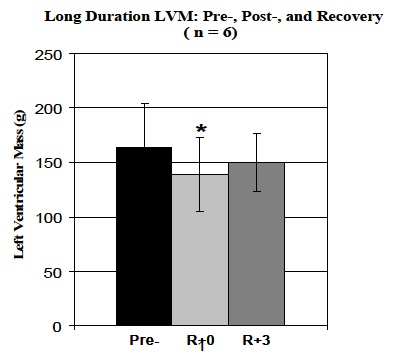
Figure 5. Left ventricular mass before and after long-duration space flight.

There is some disagreement over the mechanism of the decrease in mass, especially after short-duration missions. While there is evidence to support the idea that tissue dehydration contributes to the loss in mass after short-duration space flights, there are data from bed rest studies showing that the decrease in mass can be prevented with exercise and/or nutritional countermeasures. However, there is agreement that the greater loss of mass with long-duration flight is most likely due to atrophy.

=== QT prolongation ===
The QT interval is a measure of the combined duration of ventricular depolarization (QRS) and repolarization (T-wave). The QRS complex is usually of fixed duration in healthy individuals and does not change during long-duration space flight. Thus, changes in QT duration represent alterations in ventricular repolarization. The QT interval of the surface ECG is a spatial and temporal summation of all cardiac cellular action potentials. Not all cells within the heart share identical action potentials; therefore, a certain degree of variability, or inhomogeneity, in their repolarization time exists. The degree of inhomogeneity during repolarization directly correlates with the overall morphology of the QT waveform (primarily the T-wave) and in most cases with the QT interval duration. A clear association between the magnitude of inhomogeneity of repolarization and the risk for the development of ventricular arrhythmias has been established.

The QT interval is often corrected for heart rate and is shown as QTc. Some conditions that can prolong the QTc interval are ischemic heart disease, autonomic dysfunction, bradycardia, electrolyte abnormalities, cardiac remodeling, and dehydration medications that interfere with the cardiac potassium ion channels. Which of these factors are seen in long-duration astronauts?

- First, it is known that astronauts develop changes in the autonomic nervous system.
- Second, on long-duration flights, astronauts have a relative bradycardia compared to astronauts on short-duration flights.
- Third, there is evidence of cardiac remodeling after long-duration flight as seen in Figure 5.
- Fourth, there are medications available to astronauts aboard the ISS that prolong QTc interval, including ciprofloxacin, haldol, inderal, verapamil, zithromax, Zoloft®, and nortriptyline.

The environment created by the combination of factors listed above might cause or exacerbate the prolongation of the QT interval.

Prolongation of QTc interval does not itself guarantee an increase in ventricular arrhythmias. For example, sleep, hypothyroidism, and use of the anti-arrhythmic drug amiodarone all prolong QTc without increasing the incidence of ventricular arrhythmias. It is possible that space flight presents a similar situation. However, at this time, that determination cannot be made due to lack of data. Therefore, the data must be collected.

== Ground-based evidence ==
In general, subjects in bed rest studies do not exhibit increases in ventricular ectopy, although numerous studies have shown decreases in left ventricular mass and/or volume. During bed rest, left ventricular mass has been shown to decrease by eight percent after 6 weeks, which was thought to be related to decreased physiological loading.

Ground-based animal studies also have been used to determine the effects of microgravity on the cardiovascular system. Tachycardia has been observed in standing rats, after hindlimb-unloading for 28 days. A trend in decreased cardiac mass has also been documented in studies of hindlimb-suspended rats. However, hemodynamics in humans differ from hemodynamics in quadrupeds; thus, the rat is not the most appropriate model in which to examine the effects of microgravity on cardiovascular adaptations.

== Computer-based simulation information ==
A systems analysis using the computer model of human physiology developed at the University of Mississippi Medical Center also predicts a loss in left ventricular mass following short-duration space flight. According to the model predictions, the reductions in left ventricular mass observed after short-duration exposure to microgravity may be the result of a contraction of the myocardial interstitial fluid space secondary to a loss in the plasma volume (see Figure 6).

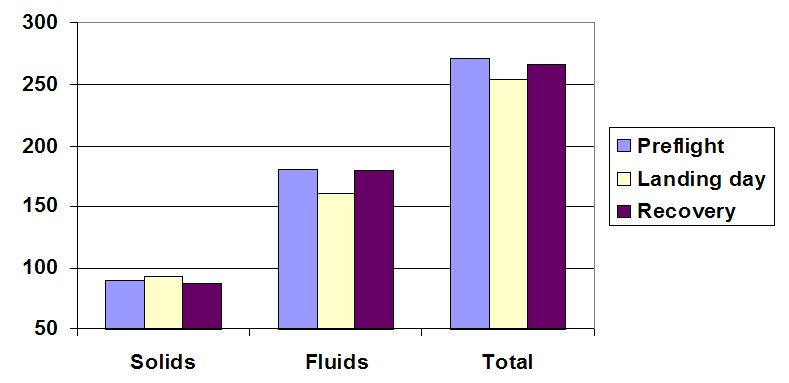
Figure 6. Model predictions of myocardial interstitial fluid spaces preflight, on landing day, and after landing day.

The finding of QTc prolongation in astronauts has been of concern from the clinical operations perspective. Such prolongation has been documented on several occasions but it is not clear if these findings have any clinical significance or portend risk.

== Risk in context of exploration mission operational scenarios ==
Cardiac rhythm disturbances could jeopardize mission objectives and, at the most extreme, the life of crewmembers. The worst-case scenario would be a life-threatening arrhythmia during a Mars exploration mission, where return to Earth would take months. Under these conditions, other crewmembers would need to treat the affected crewmember with the limited supplies available on the spacecraft.

== Gaps ==
The data are compelling enough that this risk cannot be retired until a systematic evaluation of cardiac structure and function is made on the ISS. This is considered a high priority activity.

== Conclusions ==
Very little research has systematically evaluated the prevalence (or potential risk) of cardiac arrhythmias during space flight. There are several observational reports of non life-threatening but potentially concerning arrhythmias. At least two potential risk factors for arrhythmias have been reported either during or immediately after space flight: cardiac atrophy and a prolonged QTc interval. The potential severity of the mission impact of a serious arrhythmia requires that a systematic evaluation be conducted of the risk of arrhythmia due to space flight.

== See also ==
- NASA research on the ISS
- ESA research on the ISS - Cardiovascular Function
- Ablation - Spaceflight
- MARS-500 - Cardiac Experiments

== Acronyms and abbreviations ==
Acronym/Abbreviation	Description
AV	Atrionetricular
ECG	Electrocardiogram
LV	Left Ventricle
LVM	Left Ventricular Mass
MI	Myocardial Infarction
MRI	Magnetic Resonance Imaging
NASA	National Aeronautics and Space Administration
P-Wave	Atrial Depolarization
PAC	Premature Atrial Contraction
PVC	Premature Ventricular Contraction
QRS	Ventricular Depolarization
QT	Measure of time between ventricular depolarization and repolarization
QTc	Corrected QT Interval
R+0	Landing Day
R+3	Three days post-landing (Recovery)
T-Wave	Ventricular Repolarization
V-tach	Ventricular Tachycardia
