= Mech (surname) =

Mech is a surname. Notable people with the surname include:

- L. David Mech (born 1937), American biologist
- Ramu Mech, Indian ULFA member and prisoner
- Tim Mech, Canadian guitarist and guitar technician
- Hassan El-Mech (born 1945), Moroccan sprinter
