= Cathy Wurzer =

American journalist and author

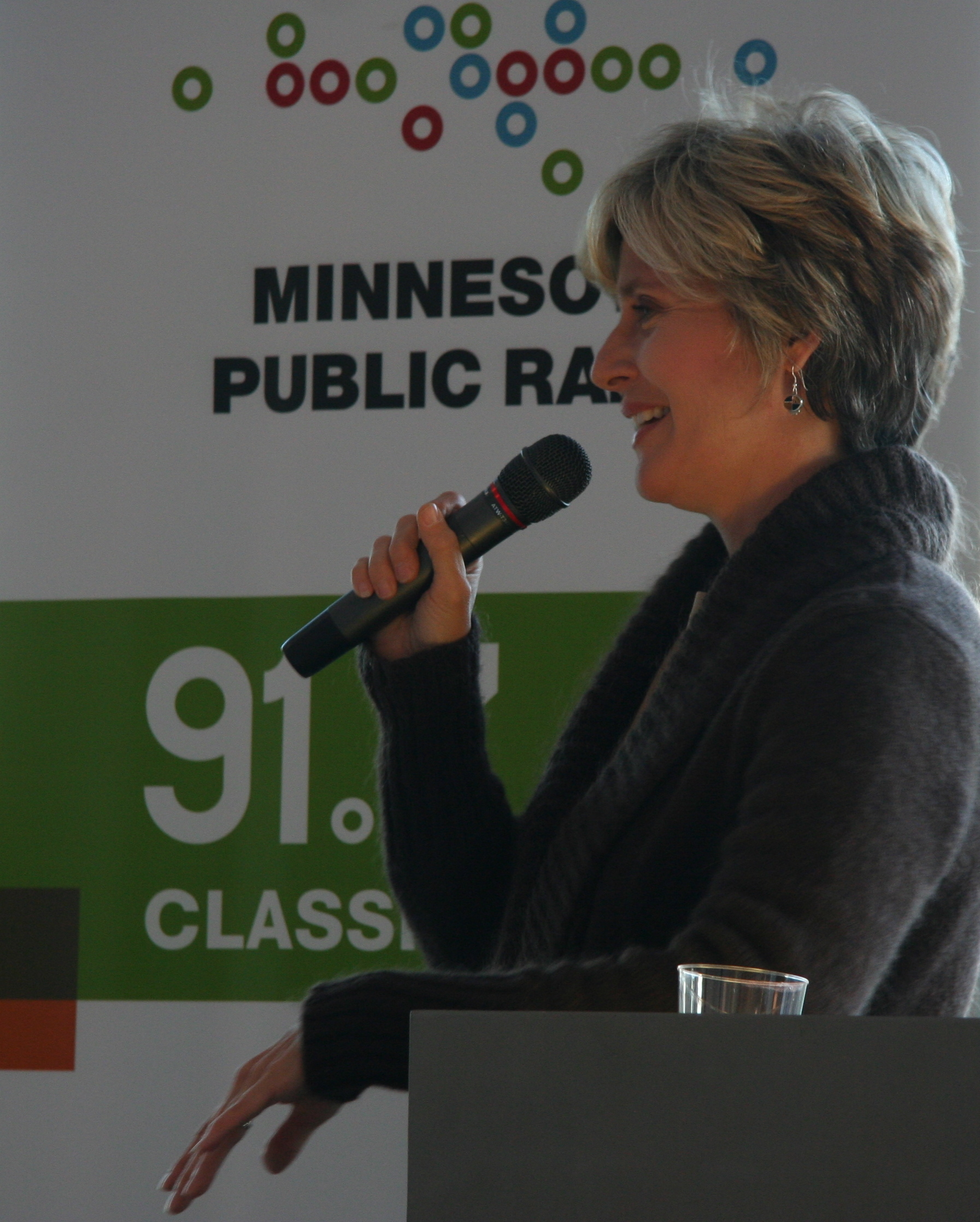
- Wurzer in 2010
- Education: University of Wisconsin-River Falls
- Occupation: Journalist
- Spouse: Eric Eskola (m. 1994–2014)

Cathy Wurzer is an American journalist. She and Eric Eskola are the longtime hosts of Almanac on Twin Cities Public Television. She also hosts the regional portion of Morning Edition on Minnesota Public Radio. In 2008, Wurzer published Tales of the Road: Highway 61, a book about US Highway 61 and Minnesota State Highway 61 in Minnesota.

== Biography ==
Wurzer is a graduate of Minneapolis South High School and the University of Wisconsin-River Falls, where she obtained degrees in broadcast journalism and urban studies.

Before joining Morning Edition and Almanac, Wurzer worked as an anchor and reporter for WCCO-TV, Minneapolis's CBS affiliate. She was also a talk-show host for WCCO-AM radio, a producer for KMSP-TV, and political reporter for KSTP-AM radio.

Wurzer was a trustee for the UW-River Falls Foundation. She is a member and past president of the Society for Professional Journalists Minnesota chapter.

When not working, Wurzer enjoys riding and training horses, fly fishing, and clay sculpting. She is divorced from her Almanac co-host, Eric Eskola.

== Honors and awards ==
Wurzer has won four Emmy Awards while at Almanac.

== Sources ==
- MPR People: Cathy Wurzer
- Wurzer, Cathy. Tales of the Road: Highway 61. Minnesota Historical Society Press, October 2008. ISBN 978-0-87351-626-6
