= Eric Eskola =

American radio personality

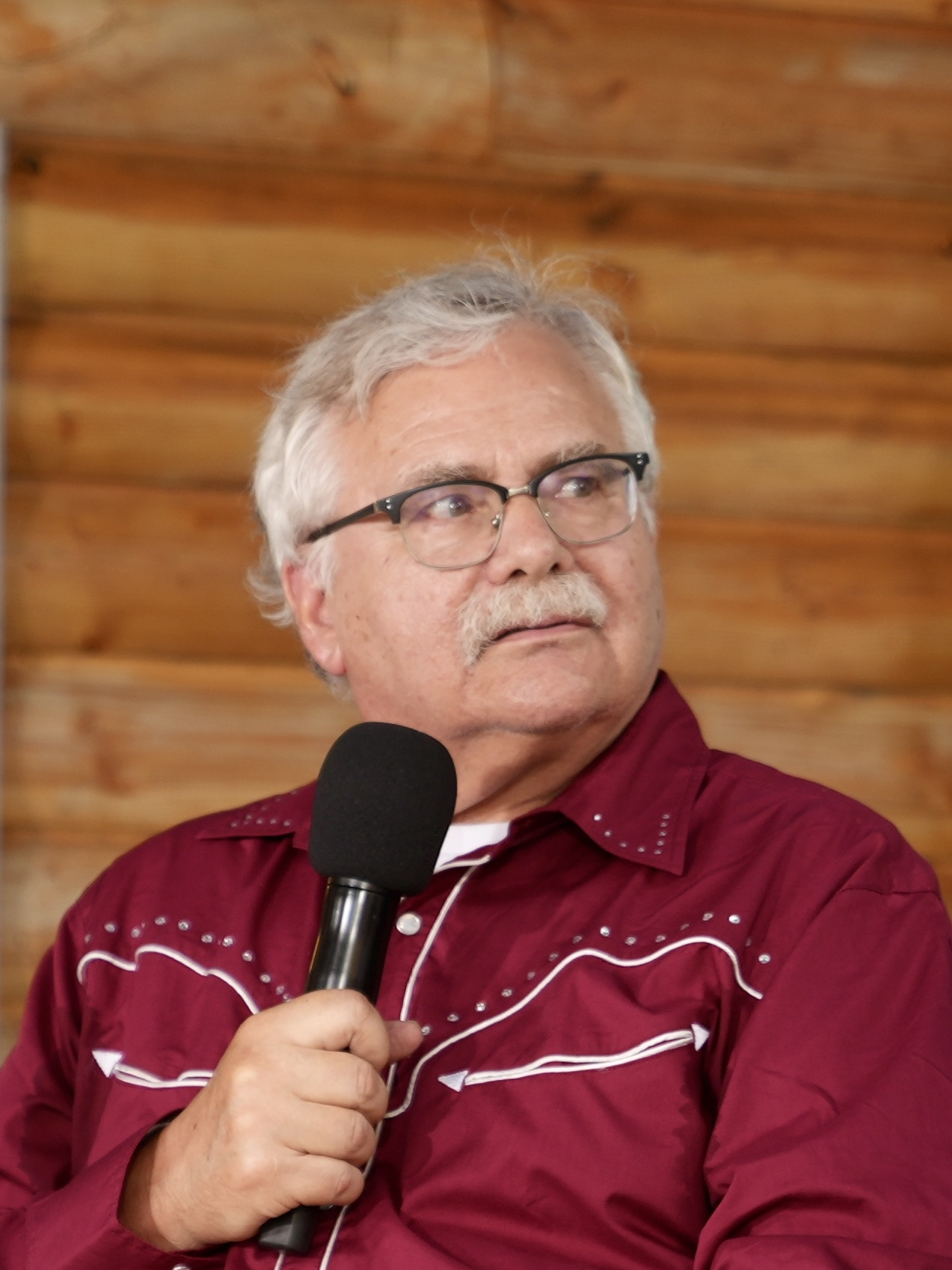
- Eskola in 2025
- Born: Duluth, Minnesota
- Occupation: Television host
- Known for: Political journalist
- Spouse: Cathy Wurzer (m. 1994–2014)

Eric Eskola is a journalist and television personality well known for his coverage of Minnesota politics and government.

Eskola has co-hosted the Minnesota political/public affairs show Almanac since 1986. He was promoted from the sports desk after the death of the original co-host, Judge Joe Summers. Eskola also spent 30 years as a political reporter for WCCO Radio in Minneapolis before taking an early retirement payout in 2010. He is widely regarded as one of the most influential political reporters in Minnesota.

Eskola is originally from Duluth, Minnesota, and graduated from the University of Minnesota Duluth. His wife, Cathy Wurzer, joined him as Almanac co-host in 1994. They divorced in 2014 but continue as co-hosts.

Eskola was inducted into the Pavek Museum of Broadcasting Hall of Fame in October 2010, and he has also won the Frank Premack "Graven Award" for contributions to journalism.
