= Karl Mecklenburg =

American football player (born 1960)

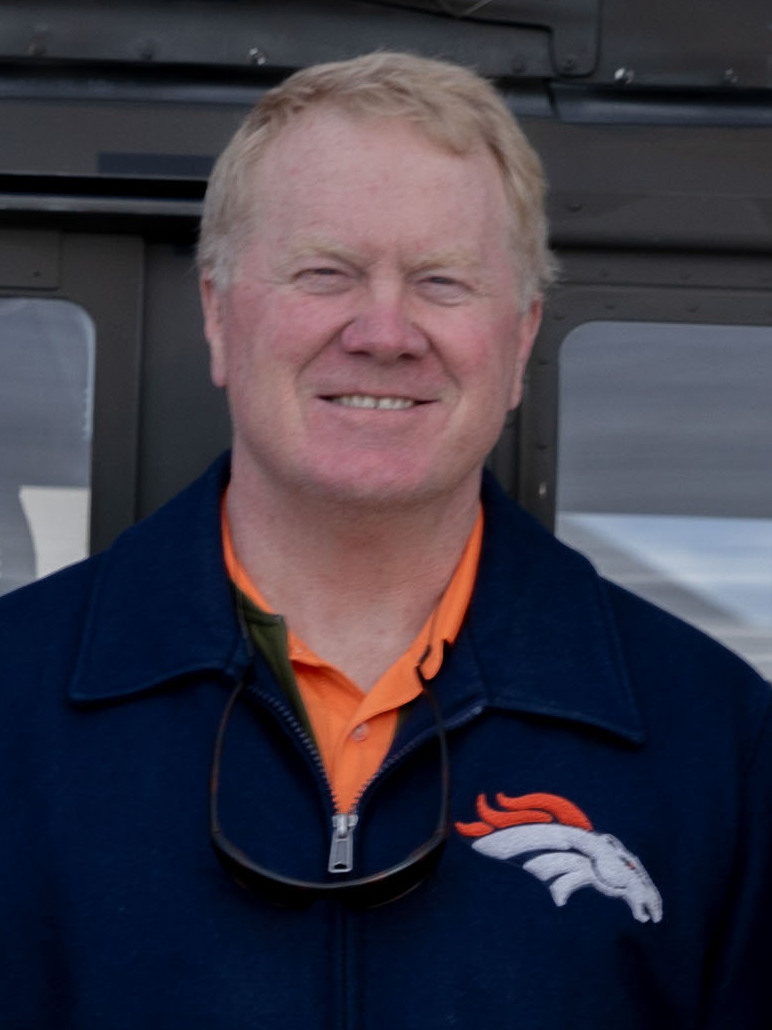
- Mecklenburg in 2023

No. 77
- Position: Linebacker

Personal information
- Born: September 1, 1960 (age 66); Seattle, Washington, U.S.
- Listed height: 6 ft 3 in (1.91 m)
- Listed weight: 230 lb (104 kg)

Career information
- High school: Edina West (Edina, Minnesota)
- College: Minnesota
- NFL draft: 1983: 12th round, 310th overall pick

Career history
- Denver Broncos (1983–1994)

Awards and highlights
- 4× First-team All-Pro (1985–1987, 1989); 6× Pro Bowl (1985–1987, 1989, 1991, 1993); Denver Broncos Ring of Fame; 2× Second-team All-Big Ten (1981, 1982)

Career NFL statistics
- Tackles: 1,118
- Sacks: 79
- Forced fumbles: 16
- Fumble recoveries: 14
- Interceptions: 5
- Defensive touchdowns: 2
- Stats at Pro Football Reference

Karl Bernard Mecklenburg (born September 1, 1960), nicknamed "the Albino Rhino", is an American former professional football player who was a linebacker for the Denver Broncos of the National Football League (NFL). He played college football for the Minnesota Golden Gophers.

== National Football League ==
In 1983, the Denver Broncos drafted Karl Mecklenburg in the 12th round with the 310th pick overall. In spite of his low selection, Mecklenburg went on to become an integral part of the Broncos' Super Bowl teams of the 1980s. He played in six Pro Bowls. His 79 sacks is the third highest total in franchise history; he is one of only three Broncos with four sacks in a game, and the only one to do so twice. In 2001, during half time of a game against the Baltimore Ravens, he and Dennis Smith were inducted into the Denver Broncos Ring of Fame. He is also in the Colorado Sports Hall of Fame and serves on the Broncos Alumni Council.

Since retiring from professional football in 1994, Mecklenburg divides his time between family, motivational speaking, and his ongoing charity involvements. Karl and his wife Kathi have three children. The Mecklenburgs reside in Littleton, Colorado. The son of Fred Mecklenburg and Marjory Mecklenburg, Karl has two brothers, Eric and Fred, and a sister, Carol.

Mecklenburg is considered one of the greatest Denver Broncos, according to NFL Films' Top 10 Denver Broncos of All Time.

=== Concussions ===
Mecklenburg suffered "at least a dozen +10 concussions" during his football career. By his early fifties, Mecklenburg was experiencing cognitive issues, including memory impairment, which he attributes to the concussions he sustained.

Mecklenburg was a plaintiff in concussion-related litigation against the NFL: "I didn't buy in to professional football with the understanding that I was going to have brain damage. I expected to have a limp. I expected to have sore joints. Bad shoulder, whatever. But that other part, that was kept from us and that wasn't right."

=== Video games ===
The digital version of Mecklenburg anchored the 3–4 defense of the Denver Broncos in the NES video games Tecmo Bowl (1989) and Tecmo Super Bowl (1991). Mecklenburg appears in the video game Madden NFL 15 (2014) in the Ultimate Team mode, as a 97 Overall player.

== Charity work ==
Mecklenburg has been the Broncos representative for Taste of the NFL, started For Mercy Sake Sackem, started The Karl Mecklenburg's REACH foundation, has been a board member for Colorado Youth Outdoors, hosted charity celebrity ski races in Durango and in Aspen, worked with Project Healing Waters, and has served as an assistant Scout Master. Karl says, "I take the opportunity and responsibility to work with charities very seriously".
