= Janice Meck =

American physiologist

Janice Valerie Meck (born 1948, also published as Jan Meck, Janice M. Sprenkle, Janice M. Fritsch, Janice M. Yelle, and Janice M. Fritsch-Yelle) is an American physiologist and an expert on the effects of zero gravity on the cardiovascular system, including cardiac rhythm problems during spaceflight, and spaceflight-induced orthostatic intolerance and its treatment.

== Education and career ==
Meck is originally from Virginia, where she was born in 1948. After a 1969 bachelor's degree from Michigan State University, and 11 years out of school raising a child, Meck received a master's degree in biology from Virginia Commonwealth University in 1982, and became a researcher there in cardiovascular physiology. There, her work included joint research with NASA, and she moved to NASA's Johnson Space Center in Houston, Texas in 1991.

She directed the NASA Cardiovascular Laboratory from 1992 to 2007, while working towards a Ph.D. in pharmacology from the University of Texas Medical Branch, which she received in 2000 with the dissertation Influence of gender on individual susceptibility to orthostatic hypotension. After stepping down as director of the laboratory she became a human health countermeasures element scientist at the Johnson Space Center.

Meck retired from NASA, and moved to Richmond, Virginia in 2011. There, she has worked at the Hunter Holmes McGuire Veterans Affairs Medical Center and as a docent at the Virginia Museum of History and Culture. She coauthored a book about Emily Winfree, a former slave and freedwoman in Richmond: The Life and Legacy of Enslaved Virginian Emily Winfree (Arcadia Publishing, 2021, with Virginia Refo).

== Recognition ==
Meck received the Presidential Early Career Award for Scientists and Engineers in 2000, and the Rotary National Award for Space Achievement in 2001. Virginia Commonwealth University gave her their Distinguished Alumni Award in 1998, and named her as an "alumni star" in 2001. She was named as an honorary member of Graduate Women in Science in 2008.

== Selected research publications ==
- Sprenkle, J. M.; Eckberg, D. L.; Goble, R. L.; Schelhorn, J. J.; Halliday, H. C. (February 1986), "Device for rapid quantification of human carotid baroreceptor-cardiac reflex responses", Journal of Applied Physiology, 60 (2): 727–732, doi:10.1152/jappl.1986.60.2.727, PMID 3949673
- Fritsch, J. M.; Charles, J. B.; Bennett, B. S.; Jones, M. M.; Eckberg, D. L. (August 1992), "Short-duration spaceflight impairs human carotid baroreceptor-cardiac reflex responses", Journal of Applied Physiology, 73 (2): 664–671, doi:10.1152/jappl.1992.73.2.664, PMID 1399995
- Fritsch-Yelle, J. M.; Charles, J. B.; Jones, M. M.; Beightol, L. A.; Eckberg, D. L. (October 1994), "Spaceflight alters autonomic regulation of arterial pressure in humans", Journal of Applied Physiology, 77 (4): 1776–1783, doi:10.1152/jappl.1994.77.4.1776, PMID 7836199
- Fritsch-Yelle, Janice M.; Whitson, Peggy A.; Bondar, Roberta L.; Brown, Troy E. (November 1996), "Subnormal norepinephrine release relates to presyncope in astronauts after spaceflight", Journal of Applied Physiology, 81 (5), American Physiological Society: 2134–2141, doi:10.1152/jappl.1996.81.5.2134, PMID 8941538
- McCarthy, John P.; Bamman, Marcas M.; Yelle, Janice M.; LeBlanc, Adrian D.; Rowe, Roger M.; Greenisen, Michael C.; Lee, Stuart M. C.; Spector, Elisabeth R.; Fortney, Suzanne M. (June 1997), "Resistance exercise training and the orthostatic response", European Journal of Applied Physiology, 76 (1): 32–40, doi:10.1007/s004210050209, PMID 9243167
- Meck, Janice V.; Waters, Wendy W.; Ziegler, Michael G.; deBlock, Heidi F.; Mills, Paul J.; Robertson, David; Huang, Paul L. (April 2004), "Mechanisms of postspaceflight orthostatic hypotension: low α1-adrenergic receptor responses before flight and central autonomic dysregulation postflight", American Journal of Physiology. Heart and Circulatory Physiology, 286 (4): H1486–H1495, doi:10.1152/ajpheart.00740.2003, PMID 14670816
