= Minnesota Citizens Concerned for Life =

Anti-abortion organization

- Abbreviation: MCCL
- Formation: June 12, 1968; 58 years ago
- Type: Nonprofit, NGO
- Affiliations: National Right to Life Committee
- Website: https://www.mccl.org

Minnesota Citizens Concerned for Life (MCCL) is the oldest and largest anti-abortion organization in Minnesota. Founded in 1968 to resist the legalization of abortion, MCCL works through education, legislation and political action to oppose abortion, infanticide, euthanasia, assisted suicide and embryonic stem cell research.

MCCL has more than 70,000 member families and 240 chapters across the state of Minnesota. Non-sectarian and non-partisan, MCCL's mission is "to secure protection for innocent human life from conception until natural death through effective education, legislation and political action." Many in the anti-abortion movement regard MCCL as one of the most effective state anti-abortion organizations in the country. MCCL is a state affiliate of the National Right to Life Committee.

MCCL's president is Scott Fischbach, husband of U.S. Representative and former Lieutenant Governor of Minnesota Michelle Fischbach. Scott Fischbach also serves as the executive director of the National Right to Life Committee. Michelle Fischbach was also President of the Minnesota State Senate and authored and backed a number of anti-abortion bills during her time as Minority and Majority leader of the Minnesota Senate.

== March for Life ==
MCCL organizes an annual anti-abortion rally at the state capitol in Saint Paul. The rally takes place on January 22nd, which marks the anniversary of the Roe v. Wade decision.
