= FoodCorps =

FoodCorps, Inc.
- Founded: 2010
- Type: Nonprofit organization
- Members: 205 AmeriCorps service members
- Key people: Curt Ellis – Co-Founder and Chief Executive Officer; Debra Eschmeyer – Co-Founder
- Website: http://www.foodcorps.org

FoodCorps is an American non-profit organization whose mission is to work with communities to "connect kids to healthy food in school." FoodCorps places service members in limited-resource communities where they spend a year working with teachers and students to establish farm to school programs, incorporate nutrition education into school curricula, plant school gardens, and engage in other initiatives to improve school food. Like Teach for America and Habitat for Humanity, FoodCorps is a grantee of AmeriCorps.

== History ==
FoodCorps was founded in 2010 by six people:

- Curt Ellis, co-creator of the documentary King Corn and recipient of the Heinz Award
- Debra Eschmeyer, formerly of the National Farm to School Network and recipient of the James Beard Foundation Leadership Award. After serving as FoodCorps' vice president of external affairs for several years, Eschmeyer became executive director of Michelle Obama's Let’s Move! initiative and senior policy advisor for Nutrition Policy at the White House.
- Cecily Upton, formerly of Slow Food USA
- Crissie McMullan, founder and former director of the VISTA Farm to School program in Montana
- Jerusha Klemperer, associate director of National Programs for Slow Food USA
- Ian Cheney, co-founder of the Yale Sustainable Food Project and co-creator of King Corn

Two of the six cofounders, Ellis and Upton, still work with the organization as chief executive officer and VP of Innovation and Strategic Partnerships, respectively.

== Function ==
FoodCorps’ mission statement is: "Together with communities, FoodCorps serves to connect kids to healthy food in school."

FoodCorps works by placing service members on year-long service stints at community-based Service Sites, where they work in low income public schools to improve nutrition. Statewide Host Sites oversee the Service Sites within each state in which FoodCorps operates.

FoodCorps service members are individuals generally from age 18 to age 30, with backgrounds in agriculture, nutrition, health and food policy. They are paid a modest stipend ($15,000, health insurance, student loan forbearance, and a $5,500 Education Award) to perform a year of food and nutrition-related service inside local schools. The applicants are screened through a competitive vetting process (in FoodCorps’ first year, 1,229 candidates applied for 50 spots). The first FoodCorps class has 50 members. FoodCorps states that it hopes to have 1,000 Service Members in all 50 states by 2020.

Service sites are community-based organizations that offer direct service opportunities in the fields of food and nutrition education, school gardens, and local procurement for school food systems. These are the locations to which service members report for day-to-day service. There are 41 service sites.

Host sites are FoodCorps’ statewide partners which oversee the service sites. They are generally non-profit organizations, educational institutions or public agencies. In most cases, host sites determine the communities and non-profit organizations with which Members will work, and help create training and orientation opportunities for FoodCorps service members. The Host Site partners are:

- Arizona: The Johns Hopkins Center for American Indian Health
- Arkansas: National Center for Appropriate Technology
- California: Community Alliance with Family Farmers and Life Lab
- Connecticut: University of Connecticut Extension
- Georgia: Georgia Organics
- Hawaii: The Kohala Center
- Iowa: Iowa State University Extension
- Maine: University of Maine Cooperative Extension
- Massachusetts: The Food Project
- Michigan: Michigan State University Extension
- Mississippi: National Center for Appropriate Technology
- Montana: National Center for Appropriate Technology
- New Jersey: Rutgers Cooperative Extension
- New Mexico: University of New Mexico, Office of Community Learning and Public Service and Farm to Table New Mexico
- New York: Edible Schoolyard NYC
- North Carolina: Center for Environmental Farming Systems and North Carolina 4-H
- Oregon: Oregon Department of Agriculture
- Washington, D.C.: Office of the State Superintendent of Education

== Philosophy ==
FoodCorps service members rely on a three-pillared model to accomplish their goal of creating a healthy food environment:

- Food and nutrition education to teach kids what healthy food is
- School gardens to engage kids and community volunteers
- Farm to school programs to put local food in school lunch

== See also ==
- AmeriCorps
- Childhood obesity
- Farm-to-school
