= Minnesota's 38th Senate district =

American legislative district

The Minnesota Senate, District 38, encompasses portions of Anoka and Ramsey counties in the northern Twin Cities metropolitan area. It has formerly included Cottonwood, Jackson, Martin, Murray, Nobles, Pipestone, Rock, Watonwan, Chisago, Kanabec, Pine, and Dakota counties. Since January 2023, the district is represented by Heather Gustafson, a Democrat who defeated the long-term incumbent, Roger Chamberlain.

== District profile ==
Minnesota Senate District 38 includes Brooklyn Park, Brooklyn Center and Osseo. These are cities in Hennepin County.

== List of senators ==
Session	Senator	Party	Term start	Term end	Home	Counties represented
14th	William D. Rice	Republican	January 2, 1872	January 5, 1874	Saint James	Cottonwood; Jackson; Martin; Murray; Nobles; Pipestone; Rock; Watonwan
15th	William D. Rice	Republican	January 2, 1872	January 5, 1874	Saint James	Cottonwood; Jackson; Martin; Murray; Nobles; Pipestone; Rock; Watonwan
16th	Everett P. Freeman		January 6, 1874	January 3, 1876	Jackson	Cottonwood; Jackson; Martin; Murray; Nobles; Pipestone; Rock; Watonwan
17th	Everett P. Freeman		January 6, 1874	January 3, 1876	Jackson	Cottonwood; Jackson; Martin; Murray; Nobles; Pipestone; Rock; Watonwan
18th	I.P. Durfee	Republican	January 7, 1878	January 13, 1876	Worthington	Cottonwood; Jackson; Martin; Murray; Nobles; Pipestone; Rock; Watonwan
19th	I.P. Durfee	Republican	January 7, 1878	January 13, 1876	Worthington	Cottonwood; Jackson; Martin; Murray; Nobles; Pipestone; Rock; Watonwan
20th	Christopher Smith	Republican	January 8, 1878	January 6, 1879	Windom	Cottonwood; Jackson; Martin; Murray; Nobles; Pipestone; Rock; Watonwan
21st	Alfred Perkins		January 7, 1879	January 1, 1883	Windom	Cottonwood; Jackson; Martin; Murray; Nobles; Pipestone; Rock; Watonwan
22nd	Alfred Perkins		January 7, 1879	January 1, 1883	Windom	Cottonwood; Jackson; Martin; Murray; Nobles; Pipestone; Rock; Watonwan
23rd	John Shaleen	Republican	January 2, 1883	January 3, 1887	Lindstrom	Chisago; Kanabec; Pine
24th	John Shaleen	Republican	January 2, 1883	January 3, 1887	Lindstrom	Chisago; Kanabec; Pine
25th	Otto Wallmark	Republican	January 4, 1887	January 5, 1891	Chisago	Chisago; Kanabec; Pine
26th	Otto Wallmark	Republican	January 4, 1887	January 5, 1891	Chisago	Chisago; Kanabec; Pine
27th	Alcinus Young Eaton	Republican	January 6, 1891	January 7, 1895	Buffalo	Sherburne; Wright
28th	Alcinus Young Eaton	Republican	January 6, 1891	January 7, 1895	Buffalo	Sherburne; Wright
29th	William Edgar Culkin	Republican	January 8, 1895	January 2, 1899	Buffalo	Sherburne; Wright
30th	William Edgar Culkin	Republican	January 8, 1895	January 2, 1899	Buffalo	Sherburne; Wright
31st	John T. McGowan	Democratic	January 3, 1899	January 2, 1911	Minneapolis	Hennepin
32nd	John T. McGowan	Democratic	January 3, 1899	January 2, 1911	Minneapolis	Hennepin
33rd	John T. McGowan	Democratic	January 3, 1899	January 2, 1911	Minneapolis	Hennepin
34th	John T. McGowan	Democratic	January 3, 1899	January 2, 1911	Minneapolis	Hennepin
35th	John T. McGowan	Democratic	January 3, 1899	January 2, 1911	Minneapolis	Hennepin
36th	John T. McGowan	Democratic	January 3, 1899	January 2, 1911	Minneapolis	Hennepin
37th	Napoleon L'Herault	Democratic	January 3, 1911	January 4, 1915	Minneapolis	Hennepin
38th	Napoleon L'Herault	Democratic	January 3, 1911	January 4, 1915	Minneapolis	Hennepin
39th
40th
41st
42nd
43rd
44th
45th
46th
47th
48th
49th
50th
51st
52nd
53rd
54th
55th
56th
57th
58th
59th
60th
61st
62nd
63rd
64th
65th
66th
67th
68th
69th
70th
71st
72nd
73rd
74th
75th
76th
77th
80th
81st
82nd
83rd
84th
85th
86th
87th	Theodore J. "Ted" Daley	Republican	January 4, 2011	January 7, 2013	Eagan	Dakota
88th	Roger Chamberlain	Republican	January 8, 2013	January 5, 2021	Lino Lakes	Anoka; Ramsey; Washington
89th	Roger Chamberlain	Republican	January 8, 2013	January 5, 2021	Lino Lakes	Anoka; Ramsey; Washington
90th	Roger Chamberlain	Republican	January 8, 2013	January 5, 2021	Lino Lakes	Anoka; Ramsey; Washington

== Recent elections ==
=== 2016 ===
The candidate filing deadline was May 31, 2016, and the primary election took place on August 9, 2016, with both candidates running unopposed. The general election was held on November 8, 2016, and Republican incumbent Roger Chamberlain defeated Democratic candidate Patrick Davern.

Minnesota State Senate election, 2008
Party	Candidate	Votes	%
Republican	Roger Chamberlain	27,109	58.67
Democratic	Patrick Davern	19,094	41.33
Total votes		46,203	100.0
Republican hold			

=== 2012 ===
The signature filing deadline for candidates wishing to run in the 2012 elections on June 5, 2012. The primary election was held on August 14, 2012, with neither candidate facing party opposition. The general election was held on November 6, 2012. Republican incumbent Roger Chamberlain defeated Democratic challenger Timothy Henderson.

Minnesota State Senate election, 2008
Party	Candidate	Votes	%
Republican	Roger Chamberlain	23,817	53.3
Democratic	Timothy Henderson	20,849	46.7
Total votes		44,666	100.0
Republican hold			
