= Laurie R. Santos =

American psychologist

Laurie Santos
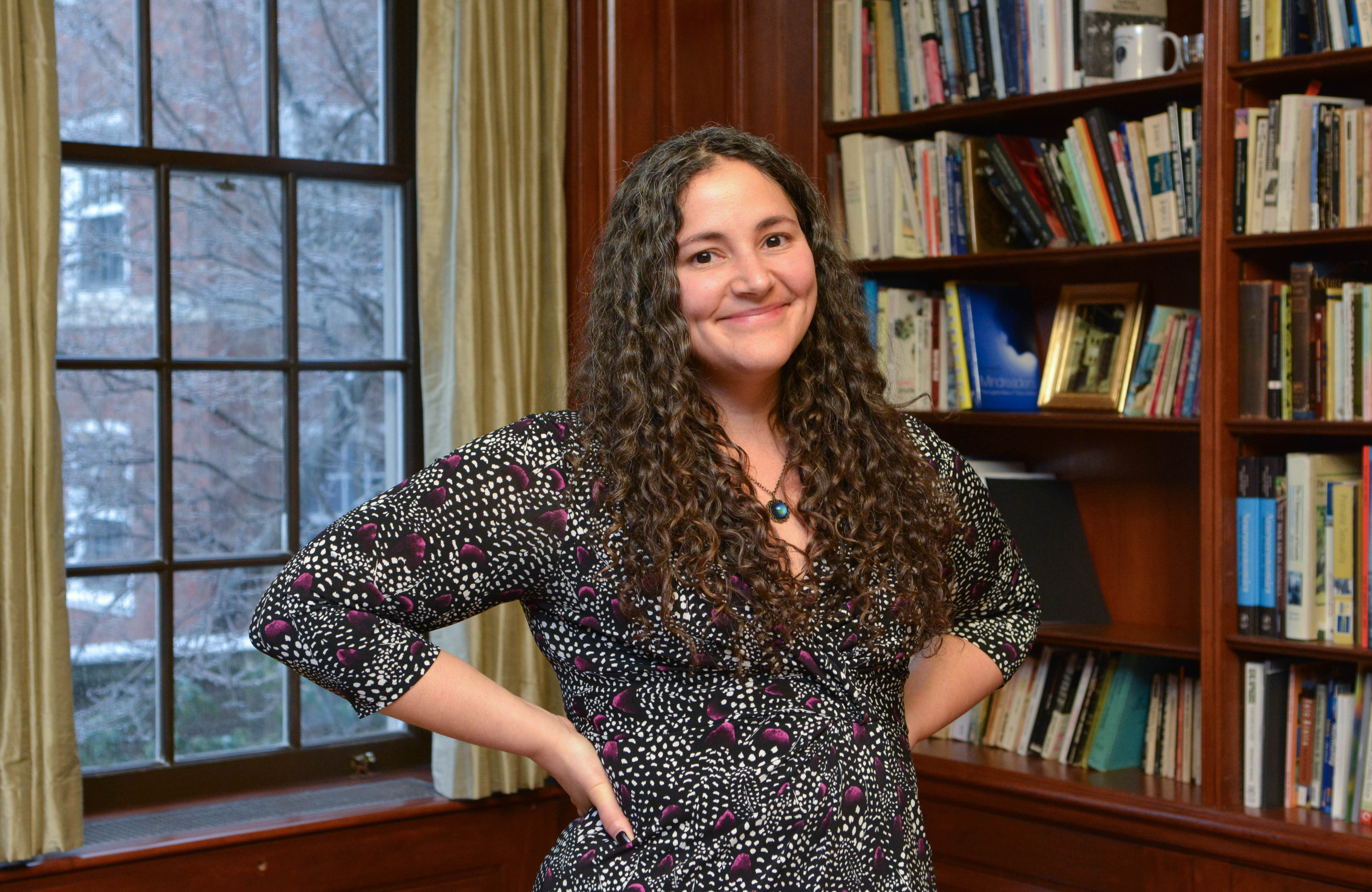
- Santos in 2018
- Born: Laurie Renee Santos; 1975 (age 50–51); New Bedford, Massachusetts, U.S.
- Education: Harvard University (BA, MA, PhD)
- Scientific career
- Fields: Psychology; Primate cognition Canine cognition
- Workplaces: Yale University
- Thesis: Domain-specific knowledge in a non-human primate (2000)
- Website: psychology.yale.edu/people/laurie-santos

Laurie Renee Santos (born 1975) is an American cognitive scientist and professor of psychology at Yale University. She is the director of Yale's Comparative Cognition Laboratory, Director of Yale's Canine Cognition Lab, and former Head of Yale's Silliman College. She has been a featured TED speaker. In 2007, Popular Science included her in its "Brilliant Ten" list of young scientists, and in 2013 Time magazine listed her as a "Leading Campus Celebrity".

In January 2018, her course Psychology and the Good Life became the most popular course in Yale's history, with approximately one-fourth of Yale's undergraduates enrolled. In September 2019, she became host of the podcast The Happiness Lab, published by Pushkin Industries, the media company led by Malcolm Gladwell and Jacob Weisberg.

== Early life and education ==
Santos was born in 1975 in a binational home in New Bedford, Massachusetts. Her father, whose family is of Cape Verdean descent, was a programmer and her mother, who is from the United States, was a guidance counselor at New Bedford High School, where Santos and her brother Aaron attended.

After high school, she attended Harvard University. As a sophomore, she became a research assistant and traveled to Cayo Santiago, a small 38-acre island east of Puerto Rico. Cayo Santiago's monkey population inspired Santos and spurred her interest in the psychology of animals. In 1997, she received her Bachelor of Arts, magna cum laude, in psychology and biology and won the annual Psychology Department Undergraduate Thesis Prize. She continued her studies as graduate student in the Harvard Psychology Department, obtaining a master's in psychology in 2001 with a focus on cognition, brain and behavior and then a Ph.D in the same field in 2003. Her dissertation won the Richard J. Herrnstein Dissertation Prize of the Harvard Graduate School of Arts and Sciences for "the best dissertation that exhibits excellent scholarship, originality and breadth of thought, and a commitment to intellectual independence".

== Career and research ==
In 2003, she began as an assistant professor in psychology and cognitive science at Yale University, earning tenure as an associate professor in 2009. Her research investigates the evolutionary origins of the human mind by comparing the cognitive abilities of humans and non-human animals, including primates and canines. Santos was Yale's director of undergraduate studies in psychology from 2010 to 2015.

In June 2016, Santos was named the head of Silliman College, one of the 14 undergraduate residential colleges at Yale, succeeding Nicholas Christakis. Santos was succeeded by Arielle Baskin-Sommers in March 2023.

Santos' Yale course, "Psychology and the Good Life" focuses on answering questions like: "What actually makes us happy?" and "What can we do to achieve the good life?" Her course has become the most popular class in Yale history and as a result, in March 2018 Yale made it available on the online learning platform Coursera as "The Science of Well-Being". As of November 2018, over 170,000 people from at least 170 countries have enrolled in the online course.

=== Featured work ===
Santos's scientific work has been published in journals such as Psychological Science, Animal Cognition, Developmental Science, Current Biology, Animal Behaviour, and Cognition. Her scientific research has been featured in outlets including The New York Times, The Los Angeles Times, The Economist, Forbes, The New Yorker, New Scientist, National Wildlife, Smithsonian Magazine, and Discover Magazine as well as on National Public Radio and Nova. She is the editor (with Bruce Hood) of The Origins of Object Knowledge. She has been featured on National Public Radio, on Big Think, and—with her colleagues Paul Bloom, Tamar Gendler and Joshua Knobe she is a regular contributor to Bloggingheads.tv’s Mind Report.

Santos has had to retract two scientific papers because of coding errors in her lab.

=== Podcast: The Happiness Lab ===
Since September 2019, Santos has hosted the podcast The Happiness Lab, which examines the latest scientific research on factors affecting our well-being and happiness. The show completed its first 10-episode season in November 2019, and has spent 126 days on the U.S. Podcasts Chart, peaking at No. 3. Santos produced further episodes of her podcast. The podcast published by Pushkin Industries, the media company led by journalists Malcolm Gladwell and Jacob Weisberg, formerly of Slate magazine.

Writing in the Financial Times, Fiona Sturges wrote: "Santos is the voice of sanity, not to mention scrupulous research. [She's] a warm yet authoritative host who shows us the contradictions in our psychological impulses."

=== Honors and awards ===
In 2007, Santos was featured in Popular Science as one of the journal's “Brilliant Ten” young scientists. In 2008, she was awarded the Stanton Prize for outstanding early-career contributions to interdisciplinary research in philosophy and psychology by the Society for Philosophy and Psychology and the Arthur Greer Memorial Prize for Outstanding Scholarly Publication or Research by Yale University. In 2010, she was a featured speaker at the TED Global Conference in Oxford, UK.

In 2011, she was featured as the Association for Psychological Science Presidential Symposium Speaker. In 2012, she was awarded Yale University's Lex Hixon Prize for teaching excellence in the social sciences, the highest teaching prize awarded at Yale College, and the American Psychological Association's Distinguished Scientific Award for Early Career Contribution to Psychology.

In 2013, she was voted as one of Time magazine's leading campus celebrities. In 2016, she served as the president of the Society for Philosophy and Psychology. In 2018, she received a Genius Award from the Liberty Science Center in New Jersey.

=== Popularization of science ===
Santos appeared in the 2018 Netflix documentary The Most Unknown on scientific research directed by Ian Cheney.

== Personal life ==
Santos is married to philosopher Mark Maxwell.

== See also ==
- Well-being
- Psychology
- Mental health
- Positive psychology
