= Victoria Orphan =

American geobiologist

- Education: University of California, Santa Barbara
- Known for: Geobiologist
- Awards: American Association of Arts and Science; MacArthur Fellowship; Gordon and Betty Moore Foundation Investigator Award; DOE Early Career Research Award; National Research Council Fellowship
- Scientific career
- Fields: Geobiology
- Workplaces: California Institute of Technology

Victoria J. Orphan is a geobiologist at the California Institute of Technology who studies the interactions between marine microorganisms and their environment. As of 2020, she is the Chair for the Center of Environmental Microbial Interactions.

== Early life and education ==
Victoria Orphan received her B.A. in Aquatic Biology (1994) and Ph.D. in Ecology, Evolution and Marine Biology (2001) from the University of California, Santa Barbara. She served as a National Research Council fellow at the NASA Ames Research Center (2002–2004) before joining the Geobiology faculty at California Institute of Technology.

== Career ==
Orphan is the James Irvine Professor of Environmental Science and Geobiology at the California Institute of Technology. She has also been an adjunct scientist at Monterey Bay Aquarium Research Institute (MBARI) since 2009 and Senior Scientist of the Center for Dark Energy Biosphere Investigations, a Science and Technology Center funded by the National Science Foundation and headquartered at the University of Southern California. As of 2020, she is the Alan V.C. Davis and Lenabelle Davis Leadership Chair for the Center of Environmental Microbial Interactions. In 2023 she was named LGBTQ+ Scientist of the Year by Out to Innovate, a global organization of LGBTQ+ students and professionals in STEM. She is the director of Caltech's Kerckhoff Marine Laboratory as well as the Center for Environmental Microbial Interactions (CEMI).

== Research ==
Orphan's research integrates molecular, microscopy, and geochemical techniques to improve understanding of various processes, including those that serve as the primary sink for the greenhouse gas methane in the ocean. She focuses on microbially-mediated anaerobic oxidation of methane (AOM) in deep sea sediment. Specifically, she looks at the relationships between two groups of marine microbes: archaea and bacteria. Orphan uses tools such as nanoSIMS to visualize these organisms at the microscale and track how and when they exchange energy. Through her research, Orphan has helped develop novel stable isotope applications that provide insight into the relationship between microbes and large-scale geochemical processes.

Orphan appeared in the 2018 Netflix documentary The Most Unknown on scientific research directed by Ian Cheney.

== Personal life ==
Orphan is in a relationship with fellow scientist Shana K. Goffredi, who teaches biology at Occidental College and also studies deep-sea ecosystems.

== Honors and awards ==
- 2001, National Research Council Fellowship, NASA Ames Research Center
- 2005, Gordon and Betty Moore Foundation Young Investigator Award
- 2010, DOE Early Career Research Award
- 2013, Gordon and Betty Moore Foundation Investigator Award
- 2014, Dr. Fred Shair Award for Programming Diversity
- 2016, MacArthur Fellowship
- 2018, NOMIS Distinguished Scientist Award
- 2020, species (Peinaleopolynoe orphanae) named after her
- 2020, American Academy of Arts and Science member
- 2021, elected Fellow of the American Geophysical Union

== Selected publications ==
Orphan, V., Hinrichs, K.-U., Ussler, W., Paull, C.K., Taylor, L., Sylva, S.P., Hayes, J.M. and DeLong, E., 2001. Comparative analysis of methane-oxidizing archaea and sulfatereducing bacteria in anoxic marine sediments. Applied and Environmental Microbiology, 67(4): 1922-1934.

Orphan, V.J., House, C.H., Hinrichs, K.-U., McKeegan, K.D. and DeLong, E.F., 2001. Methane-consuming archaea revealed by directly coupled isotopic and phylogenetic analysis. Science, 293(5529): 484-487.

Orphan, V.J., House, C.H., Hinrichs, K.-U., McKeegan, K.D. and DeLong, E.F., 2002. Multiple archaeal groups mediate methane oxidation in anoxic cold seep sediments. Proceedings of the National Academy of Sciences, 99(11): 7663-7668.

Orphan, V., Goffredi, S., Delong, E. and Boles, J., 2003. Geochemical influence on diversity and microbial processes in high temperature oil reservoirs. Geomicrobiology Journal, 20(4): 295-311.

Orphan, V., Ussler III, W., Naehr, T., House, C., Hinrichs, K.-U. and Paull, C., 2004. Geological, geochemical, and microbiological heterogeneity of the seafloor around methane vents in the Eel River Basin, offshore California. Chemical Geology, 205(3): 265- 289.

Orphan, V., Jahnke, L., Embaye, T., Turk, K., Pernthaler, A., Summons, R. and Des Marais, D., 2008. Characterization and spatial distribution of methanogens and methanogenic biosignatures in hypersaline microbial mats of Baja California. Geobiology, 6(4): 376-393.

Orphan, V. and House, C., 2009. Geobiological investigations using secondary ion mass spectrometry: microanalysis of extant and paleo-microbial processes. Geobiology, 7(3): 360-372.

Orphan, V.J., 2011. Getting cozy: hidden microbial interactions in nature. Environmental Microbiology Reports, 3(1): 16-18.

Orphan, V.J. and Hoehler, T.M., 2011. Microbiology: Hydrogen for dinner. Nature, 476(7359): 154-155.

Cavicchioli, R., Ripple, W. J., Timmis, K. N., Azam, F., Bakken, L. R., Baylis, M., ... V. Orphan… & Crowther, T. W. (2019). Scientists’ warning to humanity: microorganisms and climate change. Nature Reviews Microbiology, 17: 569-586.

Leu, A.O., Cai, C., McIlroy, S.J., Southam, G., Orphan, V.J., Yuan, Z., Hu, S. and Tyson, G.W., 2020. Anaerobic methane oxidation coupled to manganese reduction by members of the Methanoperedenaceae. The ISME journal, 14(4), pp.1030-1041.
