= Senator Rummel =

Senator Rummel may refer to:

- Jacob Rummel (1857–1928), Wisconsin State Senate
- Sandy Rummel (born 1942), Minnesota State Senate
