= Alexinomia =

Psychological phenomenon

Alexinomia is a proposed term describing a persistent difficulty or avoidance in using personal names in communication. The term was introduced in a 2023 study published in Frontiers in Psychology by Thomas Ditye, Natalie Rodax, and Lisa Welleschik. Individuals with alexinomia report discomfort or distress when required to use another person’s name in social interaction.

== Etymology ==
Alexinomia was coined by Thomas Ditye, Natalie Rodax, and Lisa Welleschik in their 2023 Frontiers in Psychology study. It is a compound of the Greek loanwords á (a-, “not”), λέξεις (léxis, “words”), and óνoμα (ónoma, “name”) and literally translates as “no words for names.”

== Description ==
Alexinomia is characterized by an inability to use personal names in communication despite knowing them. Affected individuals may be unable to produce utterances such as greetings or direct forms of address, even in familiar relationships. The phenomenon is most pronounced in direct verbal communication, particularly in face-to-face interactions, though it may also extend to indirect contexts, such as referring to others in conversation. It has been reported to be especially salient in close relationships, including romantic contexts.

Reported symptoms include:

- Anxiety, panic, embarrassment, or discomfort when attempting to use names
- Avoidance of name usage, including substituting pronouns or impersonal forms of address
- Physical reactions such as tension or nausea during attempted name use
- Feelings of inadequacy or social failure

== Proposed causes ==
The 2023 study identified strong associations between alexinomia and social anxiety, as well as insecure attachment patterns. Using a personal name may increase the perceived emotional intensity of an interaction. Qualitative findings suggest that some individuals experience name use as overly intimate, leading to discomfort or avoidance, particularly in close relationships. In some cases, avoidance of name use has been interpreted as a strategy for regulating interpersonal distance.

Additionally, saying a person’s name can increase the speaker’s social visibility, particularly in group settings. For individuals prone to self-consciousness, this may heighten anxiety due to concerns about being observed or judged. Reports from affected individuals frequently indicate onset in childhood or adolescence, often alongside traits such as shyness, difficulty expressing emotions, or discomfort with direct interpersonal engagement.
