= Roger Chamberlain (disambiguation) =

Roger Chamberlain is a Minnesota politician.

Roger Chamberlain may also refer to:

- Roger Chamberlain (fl. 1414), MP for Huntingdon (UK Parliament constituency)
- Roger Chamberlain (fl. 1450), MP for Suffolk (UK Parliament constituency)
