= The Most Unknown (film) =

Documentary film exploring scientific research

- Directed by: Ian Cheney
- Produced by: Ian Cheney; Lindsay Blatt; Xavier Aaronson; Joseph Bachor
- Cinematography: Taylor Krauss; Michael James Murray; Emily Topper
- Edited by: Ian Cheney; Daniel Quintanilla
- Music by: Simon Beins; Ben Fries
- Distributed by: Motherboard Tech by Vice Media
- Release date: March 16, 2018
- Running time: 88 minutes
- Language: English

The Most Unknown is a 2018 documentary film, directed by Ian Cheney, that introduces nine researchers from diverse scientific backgrounds to areas of scientific field work new to them. The film has had mixed reviews, with some reviewers focused on the participants' contagious fascination with research on life's biggest mysteries ("the most unknown"), while other reviewers criticised the film's coverage of difficult technical concepts as lacking depth.

== Description ==
The film presents interviews with nine scientists, each conducted by a scientist in another discipline—"a geobiologist, molecular biologist, various physicists studying space and time, cognitive psychologists, and a neuroscientist—who take turns visiting one another to get a cursory taste of the other's field", according to The Village Voice. Film Journal International said, "In each of the nine segments, one scientist travels to meet another scientist of a different discipline to learn about the research they're doing. Then the scientist whose research has just been discussed heads off to a new location (usually remote, always beautifully lensed) where somebody from a separate school of study tells them about what they're up to. And so on."

Reviewers described the interviews variously as "a La Ronde of intellectuals", "nine scientists... who visit one another blind-date style", "a round-robin of wonder", "a daisy chain of nine curious scientific minds... a scientific game of tag", "global game of tag with experts", "beads on a chain of discovery", "a daisy chain of one-on-one interviews / lab tours", "an intellectual relay race or high-IQ speed dating", and "a global relay of encounters in an effort to find commonality of language and purpose as life's big questions are explored".

=== Cast and crew ===
Scientists who interviewed each other included microbiologist Jennifer Macalady, physicist Davide D'Angelo, psychologist Axel Cleeremans, astrobiologist Luke McKay, astrophysicist Rachel Smith, geobiologist Victoria Orphan, physicist Jun Ye, neuroscientist Anil Seth, and cognitive psychologist Laurie R. Santos.

The documentary was directed by Ian Cheney, with advisor Werner Herzog, and was supported by a grant from Science Sandbox, a Simons Foundation initiative "dedicated to engaging everyone with the process of science".

=== Distribution ===
Motherboard Tech by Vice Media used a "multimodal release strategy", premiering the film at the Copenhagen International Film Festival on March 16, 2018; it was released in theaters on May 18, 2018. In the summer it began streaming on Netflix, which had global rights and made it available in 25 languages. Finally it was posted as nine individual episodes on YouTube.

== Critical response ==
Daphne Howland of The Village Voice praised the concept of the film as raising "some of the grandest, if also the most basic, mysteries — like our perception of time or whether there's life on other planets". Howland also commented on the film's beautiful settings as "photogenic", criticizing that the science was not "deeply explained". Ken Jaworowski's The New York Times review agreed, saying the documentary "extols the wonders of science and of all that's yet to discover", but a drawback is that with 10 minute episodes, it is difficult to grasp the concepts, and the scientists are less skilled as interviewers.

Jaworowski said the film "works best as inspiration to delve deeper into these disciplines, and as a celebration of science". The New Yorker's Sara Larson said director Cheney's "goal isn't so much to inform as to inspire, and it's vicariously exciting to watch his subjects step out of their own research and into that of their peers."

Film Journal International said,

Cheney places viewers in each setting with sweeping, sparkling vistas of strange beauty that would make David Attenborough weep. As different as their backgrounds are, the scientists chosen by Cheney are a uniformly cheerful and eager-to-pitch-in bunch who are more excited than daunted by the odds stacked against their various projects. As observational astronomer Rachel Smith describes her work at one point, "You've got a puzzle with a million, or billion pieces. We've got one piece."

— Chris Barsanti

Robert Abele of the Los Angeles Times identifies two disarming motifs expressed in the film: "a thirst for knowledge and a belief that there's so much more to learn about what makes us and our world", and "The collegial awe that accompanies a proud nerd's introduction to another's elaborate measuring machines".

The film review site "100 Films in a Year", says:

In this documentary, nine scientists working on some of the hardest problems across all fields (the "most unknowns") meet each other... It not only touches on the basics of what the unknowns they're investigating are, but also how they go about investigating or discovering these things — the day-to-day realities of actually "doing" Science. Alongside that, it reveals the scientific mindset; what motivates them. The nine individuals are very different people working on very different problems in very different fields, but the film draws out the similarities in their natures that drive them to explore the unknown... Plus, as a film, it's beautifully shot. A lot of this science is taking place in extreme locations, which bring with them a beauty and wonder of their own.

— Richard Nelson

Movie Nation's reviewer Roger Moore writes, "The Most Unknown mashes up scientists from widely divergent fields for intellectual, scientific, social and even comic effect... They talk of how no one genius making a breakthrough alters human knowledge, but of scientific scholarship, building on tradition, earlier proofs, a wall of What We Know built one brick at a time." Moore also says the film "...humanizes a class of people being demonized in America's virulent outbreak of Know-Nothingism. These are smart, funny and charming worker bees with limits to their knowledge, just like the rest of us... this class of open-minded thinkers should be celebrated, emulated and above all else, funded."

Indira Arriago of Anchorage Express writes, "The interactions between the scientists are eye-opening for them and for the viewers and reminds one of the importance of curiosity as integral to living a meaningful life." Arriago also says, "If there are a couple of shortfalls, they are, one, the film is too short and not deep enough, but 88 minutes only go so far; and two, it doesn't explore the precipice on which science meets poetry, and while it addresses the explorations into 'how' things work and the interrelationships, it falls shy of exploring 'why' things are."

That analysis is echoed by other reviews. The Hollywood Reporter says although the film "seeks intellectual common ground between researchers in a slew of scientific fields", it "goes in rather the opposite direction: diving into the mysteries of the cosmos, but finding itself stuck in the shallow end of the pool".

Similarly, Anupam Kant Verma of Firstpost.com writes, "The Most Unknown, Netflix's latest documentary, is a scientific adventure that never really launches into infinity and beyond... while it occasionally provides glimpses of the possibilities that keep emerging before the human race, perhaps bogged down by its short runtime and format, it fails to elicit the sense of wonder that keeps our mouths open." Verma says the film "traipses across the razor's edge of understanding, too little for those with an interest in the subjects and sometimes way too much jargon for those unaware of the disciplines... the massive amounts of information that needs to be condensed to sustain the narrative often strips it of its wonderment."

Verma writes of the scientists, "Their awareness of the boundlessness that confronts them is staggering. It is only matched by their firm belief in the resilience of the human spirit to explore new worlds. A deep sense of optimism underpins the film."
