= Frontiers in Psychology =

- Discipline: Psychology
- Language: English
- Edited by: Axel Cleeremans

Publication details
- History: 2010–present
- Publisher: Frontiers (Switzerland)
- Open access: Yes
- License: Creative Commons Attribution
- Impact factor: 3.8 (2022)

Standard abbreviations
- ISO 4: Front. Psychol.

Indexing
- ISSN: 1664-1078
- OCLC no.: 701805890

Links
- Journal homepage; Online archive

Frontiers in Psychology is a peer-reviewed open-access academic journal covering all aspects of psychology. It was established in 2010 and is published by Frontiers Media, a controversial company that is included in Jeffrey Beall's list of "potential, possible, or probable predatory publishers". The editor-in-chief is Axel Cleeremans (Université libre de Bruxelles).

== Abstracting and indexing ==
The journal is abstracted and indexed in Current Contents/Social & Behavioral Sciences, EBSCO databases, PsycINFO, and Scopus.

The journal has a 2022 impact factor of 3.8. In 2016, the journal had a score of 2 in the Norwegian Scientific Index, which "covers the most prestigious and rigorous channels". However, this listing was revised in 2023 to the X list which marks publication channels where there is doubt as to whether they should be approved or not and which The National Board of Scholarly Publishing and The Norwegian Directorate for Higher Education and Skills wants feedback from the research community. In 2024, the journal had a score of 1 (standard academic).

== Controversies ==
In February 2013, Frontiers in Psychology published a study by Stephan Lewandowsky and co-authors which analysed the conspiracy theories offered by the climate blog readers who responded to his 2012 paper about public opinion on climate change. In March 2014, Frontiers retracted the study, indicating that while they "did not identify any issues with the academic and ethical aspects of the study" they believed that "the legal context is insufficiently clear". DeSmogBlog said that the main legal concern was whether it was potentially defamatory for the paper to link climate change denialism to conspiracy theorists. There were public concerns about the "chilling effect" of the decision on research. On 4 April 2014, Frontiers said they retracted the 2013 Lewandowsky article because the authors did not sufficiently protect the rights of people analyzed and named in the article: "Specifically, the article categorizes the behaviour of identifiable individuals within the context of psychopathological characteristics." An Ars Technica article discussed the controversy, including "apparent contradictions" between Frontiers' March 2014 retraction and their April 2014 statement.

Due in part to this incident, Frontiers Media was included in Jeffrey Beall's list of "potential, possible, or probable predatory publishers" before Beall decided to shut down his website, though both the Committee on Publication Ethics and the Open Access Scholarly Publishing Association have stated that they have no concerns with Frontiers' membership of their organizations.
