= Colin Cheney =

American poet (born 1978)

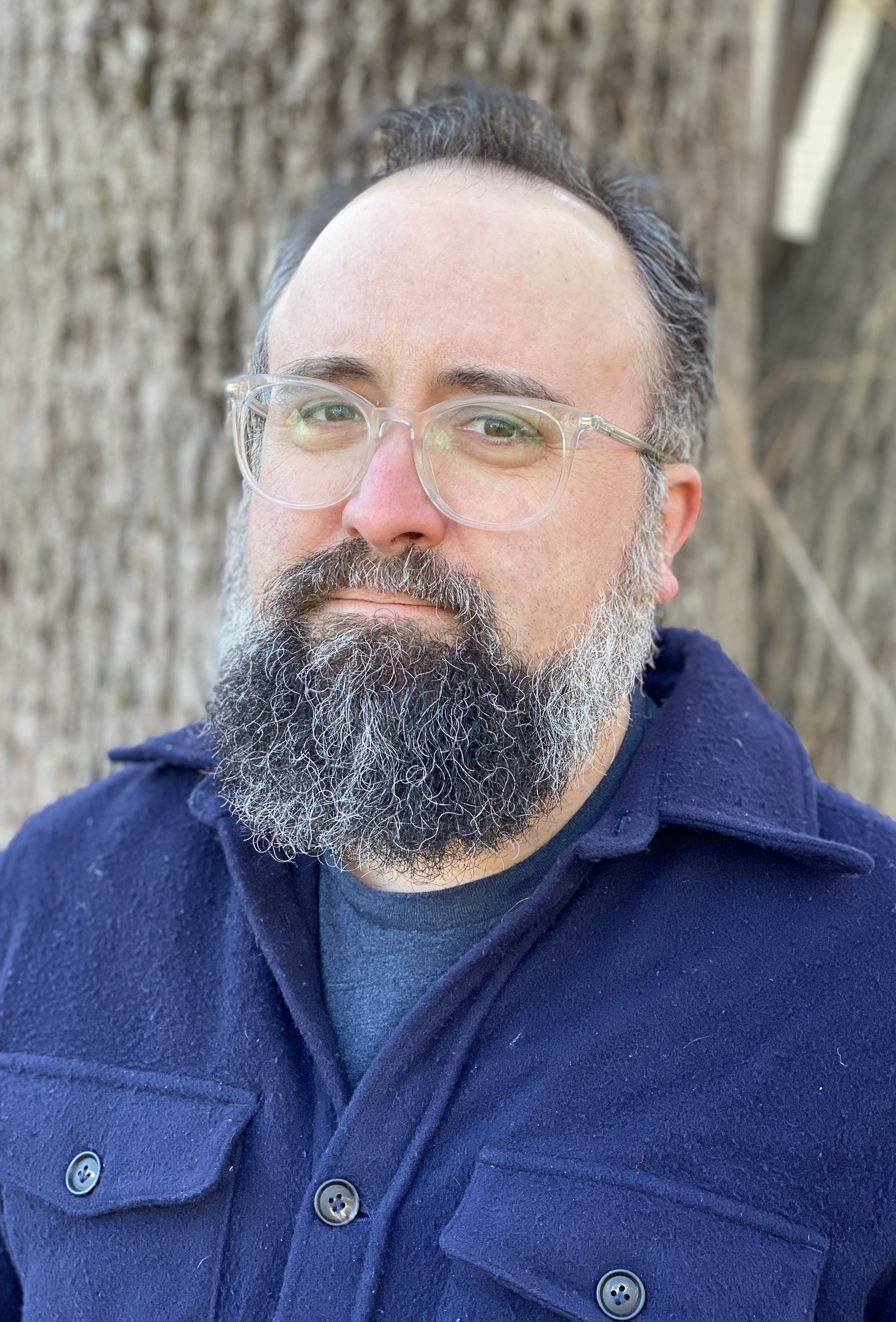
- Poet Colin Cheney
- Born: 1978 (age 47–48); Boston, Massachusetts, U.S.
- Education: Brown University (BA); New York University (MFA)
- Occupation: Poet
- Relatives: Ian Cheney (brother)
- Website: www.colincheney.com

Colin Cheney (born 1978 Boston, Massachusetts) is an American poet.

His debut collection, Here Be Monsters, was selected for the National Poetry Series in 2009. His work has appeared in many publications including American Poetry Review, Crazyhorse, Gulf Coast, Kenyon Review, Massachusetts Review, Ploughshares, Poetry Magazine. He is an editor of Tongue: A Journal of Writing & Art.

He graduated from Brown University, with a BA in Environmental Studies in 2001. In 2007, he received an MFA from New York University.

He is the brother of film producer Ian Cheney.

He composed the score for the Werner Herzog-produced documentary, The Arc of Oblivion.

In 2024, he curated "Things We Lost in The," a multimedia art project whose "bizarre and wondrous brilliance of the hypnotic conceptual experiment" Jorge S. Arango described as "as pure an illustration of the power of narrative as you’ll likely encounter in an art show."

== Awards ==
- 2006 Ruth Lilly Fellowships
- 2009 National Poetry Series
- 2010 Pushcart Prize for the poem "Lord God Bird"

== Works ==
- "Half-Ourselves & Half-Not", Poetry (September 2009)
- "Ars Poetica with Vulture", Kenyon Review
- "Hanging Garden", "Guernica: A Journal of Writing & Art" (with audio)
- "Observatory", "Waccamaw: A Journal of Contemporary Literature"
- "Home Lesson," The Missouri Review
- Here Be Monsters (The University of Georgia Press, 2010)
