= The City Dark =

2011 film by Ian Cheney

- Directed by: Ian Cheney
- Produced by: Ian Cheney; Colin Cheney; Julia Marchesi; Tamara Rosenberg
- Cinematography: Ian Cheney; Taylor Gentry
- Edited by: Lindsey Plumb; Frederick Shanahan
- Music by: Simon Beins; Benjamin Fries
- Release date: 2011
- Running time: 83 minutes
- Country: United States
- Language: English

The City Dark is a documentary film by filmmaker Ian Cheney about light pollution. It won the Best Score/Music Award at the 2011 SXSW Film Festival and was nominated for at the 34th News & Documentary Emmy Awards.
