= The Emoji Story =

2019 documentary directed by Martha Shane and Ian Cheney

- Directed by: Martha Shane; Ian Cheney
- Produced by: Ian Cheney; Jennifer 8. Lee; Martha Shane
- Cinematography: Emily Topper; Ian Cheney; Lucy Martens
- Edited by: Frederick Shanahan
- Music by: Simon Beins; Ben Fries
- Distributed by: Utopia
- Release date: 2019
- Running time: 81 minutes

The Emoji Story is a documentary directed by Martha Shane and Ian Cheney. The film was selected for the Tribeca Festival and debuted there in 2019 with the name Picture Character. In 2020, it was acquired by Utopia and re-released as The Emoji Story.

== Background ==
At the 2019 South by Southwest festival—months before the Tribeca Festival—Unicode Emoji Subcommittee vice-chair and Emojination leader Jennifer 8. Lee presented on new emojis depicting interracial couples which she had developed with partners at Tinder. There, she mentioned the upcoming release on a film about emoji.

== Synopsis ==
The film details Unicode's official process for implementing new emojis every year, investigates the origins of emoji, and discusses emoji as a modern language, a sociolinguistic tool, and a means of representation. It includes perspectives from community members who have sought to diversify and add to official emoji, such as Rayouf Alhumedhi's campaign to pitch an emoji for the hijab and Katrina Parrott's efforts to include more skin tones in emoji. It additionally features commentary from Japanese emoji inventor Shigetaka Kurita, Maine Senator Angus King, and American-Irish type designer Michael Everson, among others.

== Promotion ==
From February 16 to March 2, 2021, The Emoji Story was regularly streamed at the Museum of Modern Art. The museum additionally held a Q&A between Lee and museum curators, as well as created a video on how emojis are designed.

In 2021, Adobe and Emojination partnered together to "support the development of new emoji proposals that further global and diverse representation through virtual documentary screenings of The Emoji Story, community events, workshops and more." The same year, Harvard University's CS50x course streamed the film to students with Adobe's support.

== Critical reception ==
On the review aggregator website Rotten Tomatoes, 92% of 12 critics' reviews are positive, with an average rating of 7/10.

The Hollywood Reporter found the film smart and amusing, specifically through its "clever touches relating to its subject matter, such as an emoji version of the pre-show theater announcement and graphics of emojis related to the topics being discussed scattered liberally throughout the proceedings."

Remezcla found "many joys in Shane and Cheney’s documentary," such as Flor Coelho's proposal for a maté emoji and appreciated the film's "questions about the universalizing potential of these small pictorial representations: the language we use not only reflects but helps shape the world we live in."

In Bloomberg, Max Raskin pushed back against the Unicode Consortium's role in determining which emojis should be officially included, writing: "The personal quirks and idiosyncrasies of the subcommittee are on display in the documentary when it is revealed that there aren’t more vegetable emojis because the members don’t like vegetables. These should not be the people dictating how the digital world expresses itself."
