= Curtis Ellis =

American filmmaker

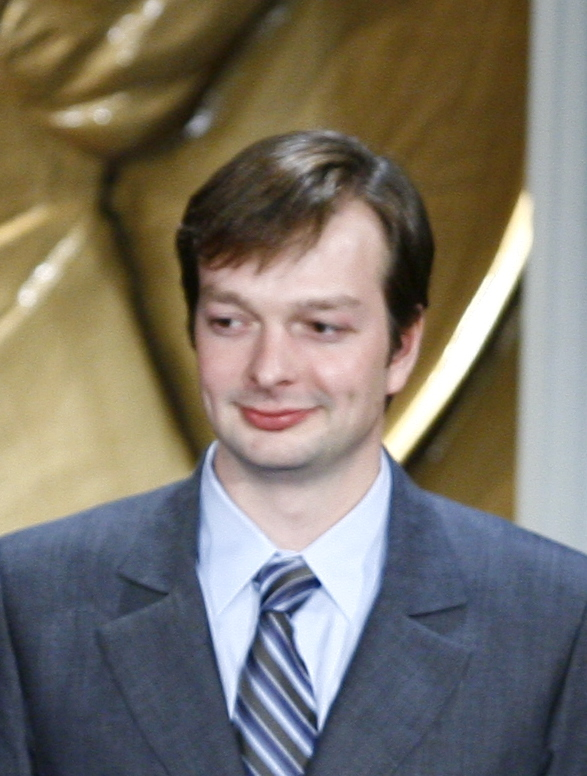
- Ellis at the 68th Annual Peabody Awards
- Born: 15 December 1979 (age 45); Portland, Oregon, USA
- Occupation(s): Executive Director, FoodCorps

Curtis Cleland 'Curt' Ellis (born December 15, 1979) is an American filmmaker, social entrepreneur, and advocate for sustainable agriculture and healthy food. He serves as co-founder and Executive Director of the nonprofit organization FoodCorps. He shared a Peabody Award in 2008 for King Corn, which he co-produced and starred in, and in 2011 he won the 17th Annual Heinz Award (with special focus on the environment) with longtime collaborator Ian Cheney for their work in the sustainable food movement.

== Early life ==
Ellis was born in Lake Oswego, Oregon. Ellis' father was Barnes Ellis, an attorney and his mother was Beatrice Ellis, a teacher. The youngest of six children, Ellis attended Lakeridge High School in Oregon and The Mountain School in Vermont.

== Education ==
Ellis earned a B.A. in History from Yale College.

== Career ==
=== Documentary films ===
Ellis co-created and starred in the 2007 Mosaic Films documentary, King Corn. The film, which The Washington Post called "Required viewing for anyone planning to visit a supermarket, fast-food joint, or their own refrigerator," followed Ellis and his best friend Ian Cheney on a yearlong quest to grow an acre of corn and trace its journey into food. Directed by Ellis' cousin Aaron Woolf, King Corn featured journalist Michael Pollan and Nixon-era Agriculture Secretary Earl Butz. It received a limited theatrical release, aired nationally on PBS Independent Lens and won a 2008 George Foster Peabody Award.

In the 2009 sequel Big River: A King Corn Companion, directed by Ellis and co-produced by Ellis and Woolf, Ellis and Cheney returned to Iowa to investigate the ecological impacts of chemical-intensive agriculture. The film featured Yale University scientist John Wargo and geneticist Wes Jackson in its examination of the hypoxic dead zone and the link between herbicides and cancer. Environmentalist and author Bill McKibben called Big River "a sharp and clever reminder that nothing ever really goes away, certainly not the soup of chemicals we're pouring on our fields." Big River aired on Planet Green in 2010.

Ellis and Cheney founded the documentary and advocacy company Wicked Delicate Films in 2005. Wicked Delicate's first feature documentary, The Greening of Southie, produced by Ellis and directed by Cheney, aired on the Sundance Channel in 2008. The film told the story of Boston's first residential green building from the perspective of the men and women who constructed it. The Greening of Southie was later rebroadcast by the Documentary Channel and released on DVD by A&E Television Networks.

In 2010, in collaboration with Cheney and journalist Jennifer 8. Lee, Ellis received funding from the National Endowment for the Humanities to develop a documentary about American Chinese food called The Search for General Tso. Ellis also served as a Producer on Cheney's 2011 documentary, Truck Farm.

=== Food advocacy and FoodCorps ===
The release of King Corn coincided with congressional debate on the Farm Bill. Through an outreach campaign supported by the W.K. Kellogg Foundation and the Fledgling Fund, Ellis and the film's co-creators worked to spark discussion of food and farm issues among the general public. Ellis' op-ed "Make Real Food the Focus of Farm Bill" appeared in the Omaha World-Herald, and he served as a guest on CBS News Sunday Morning, Good Morning America, and NPR.

Ellis and Cheney have made a point of pairing all their other documentary film projects with advocacy campaigns. Big River incorporated a letter-writing campaign that promoted conservation practices in agriculture. The Greening of Southie was the subject of an Earth Week in the Union Halls "Green Collar" initiative featured in The New Yorker.. Their Truck Farm outreach campaign spawned the creation of 25 mobile garden projects around the country.

In 2010, Ellis and five colleagues co-founded the nonprofit organization FoodCorps as a response to the national epidemic of childhood obesity and diet-related disease. The group's anchor program is an AmeriCorps public service initiative that recruits young leaders for a year of full-time public service fostering healthy school food environments in low-income communities. Working across the country, FoodCorps service members conduct nutrition education, build and tend school gardens, and promote local food in school cafeterias. For the program's first year, 1229 candidates applied for 50 Service Member positions. Ellis is the organization's current Executive Director.

A frequent speaker on issues of sustainability, Ellis has lectured at TEDx, the Muddy Boot Festival, MountainFilm, and other numerous conferences and campuses. In 2011 he delivered the Casey Shearer Memorial Lecture at Brown University.

Ellis is a former Food and Community Fellow, a current Draper Richards Kaplan Social Entrepreneur, and a member of the Board of Directors of Slow Food USA.

== Filmography ==
- King Corn, Co-Creator (2007)
- The Greening of Southie, Producer (2008)
- Big River, Director (2010)
- Truck Farm, Producer (2011)
