= Yale Sustainable Food Program =

Coordinates: 41.3205°N 72.9213°W

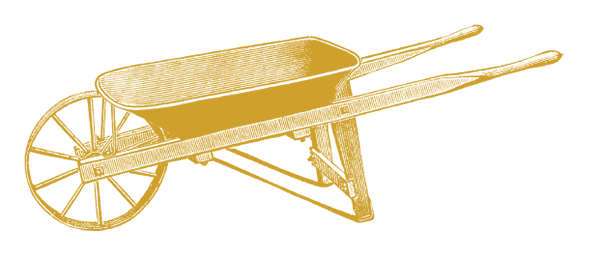
- Formation: 2001
- Type: Non-profit organization
- Location: New Haven, Connecticut
- Director: Mark Bomford
- Parent organization: Yale University
- Website: www.sustainablefood.yale.edu

The Yale Sustainable Food Program (YSFP) serves as a hub for the study of topics in sustainable food and agriculture at Yale University. Founded as the Yale Sustainable Food Project in 2001, the YSFP runs a campus teaching farm, supports a range of different curricular and extra-curricular study opportunities for both undergraduate and graduate students, and provides fellowships, awards, and grants for international and professional experience for Yale students.

== History ==
In 2001, Yale students, faculty, and staff, President Richard Levin, and chef Alice Waters founded the YSFP with a focus on launching a sustainable dining program. The YSFP's pilot sustainable dining program at Berkeley College received accolades from the Wall Street Journal as the best college dining hall in the country. The popularity of the YSFP's sustainable menus at Berkeley led students enrolled at other Colleges to forge IDs to enter. The success of the Berkeley dining hall pilot led to the growth of sustainable dining options across the university, culminating in the establishment of Yale Dining in 2007. With a local Connecticut celebrity chef taking reins of the program in 2014 and is still presently overseeing it.

Responding to student demand following the establishment of the Berkeley College pilot project, the YSFP gradually added a range of opportunities for both study and practice in the field of sustainable food and farming. Today, the YSFP works on the Yale Farm, in the classroom, and around the world.

In 2014, the YSFP launched its Global Food Fellows program. The program offers competitive travel awards for Yale students to study innovative food system projects internationally.

== Operations ==
The farm describes its mission as, "On the farm, in the classroom, and around the world, the Yale Sustainable Food Program grows food literate leaders."

The Sustainable Food Program manages a small campus farm for learning and research. It supports both curricular and extra-curricular learning, and serves as a hub to connect Yale’s students to opportunities for study and practice in topics related to food, health, and the environment.

== The Yale Farm ==
Yale's main campus teaching farm, established in 2003, operates on a 1-acre (4,000 m^{2}) plot located on the William Whitman Farnam Memorial Gardens on Edwards Street between Prospect Street and Whitney Avenue in New Haven, Connecticut. The YSFP established a second teaching farm at Yale's West Campus in 2012. After several years of growth and expansion, the West Campus Urban Farm was re-launched independently as the Yale Landscape Lab in 2016. The agricultural areas of both teaching farms are managed to meet or exceed the standards required for organic certification, though neither farm has been formally certified. The Yale Farm on Edwards Street was originally managed using the intensive market gardening style popularized by growers such as Eliot Coleman and Jean-Martin Fortier.

Since 2014, the Yale Farm has diversified its management strategy to reflect the varied learning objectives of courses taught at Yale. In 2019, the farm retains a section of intensive annual vegetable production from its earlier days, but is largely dedicates its production towards specific courses and collaborations, for example, with ancient and modern grain plantings in collaboration with Washington State University's Bread Lab, or by trialing new cultivars in collaboration with Row 7 Seeds.

Harvests from the farm are sold by students at the Wooster Square Saturday farmers market, are used at The Yale Study’s farm-to-table restaurant Heirloom, and are occasionally used as ingredients for dining hall meals in partnership with Yale Hospitality. Due to its crop yield size, Yale Farm harvests are used in the regularly rotating menu in the food services of the college dining halls. The farm features perennial agroforestry areas, culinary and medicinal herbs, fruit orchards, honeybee hives, a grazed poultry flock, mushroom cultivation, hops used in the small-batch production of a "Yale Ale" (produced by graduate students and not available for sale) and a small plot of crops used historically by the people, managed in partnership with Yale's Native American Cultural Center.

Throughout the school year, the Yale Farm hosts open volunteer workdays for Yale students and the greater New Haven community, offering a hands-on opportunity to engage with food, farming, and sustainability. After Friday workdays during the fall and spring, the Yale Farm hosts Knead 2 Know, a weekly presentation series where students and guests share their food systems research or work. Yale professors from a wide range of disciplines use the farm as a living classroom for teaching and research, and local K–12 teachers bring their classes for lessons in ecology, science, and food production. During the summer, the Lazarus Summer Internship offers Yale undergraduates a paid opportunity to live and work in New Haven while exploring the intersections of food, agriculture, and climate through fieldwork, workshops, and independent projects. Other summer interns and research assistants also connect their farm work to academic research and term-time studies. Each spring and fall, new students gather around the hearth oven to share pizza during Bulldog Days and before departing on pre-orientation trips, continuing the farm’s tradition of building community through food and place.

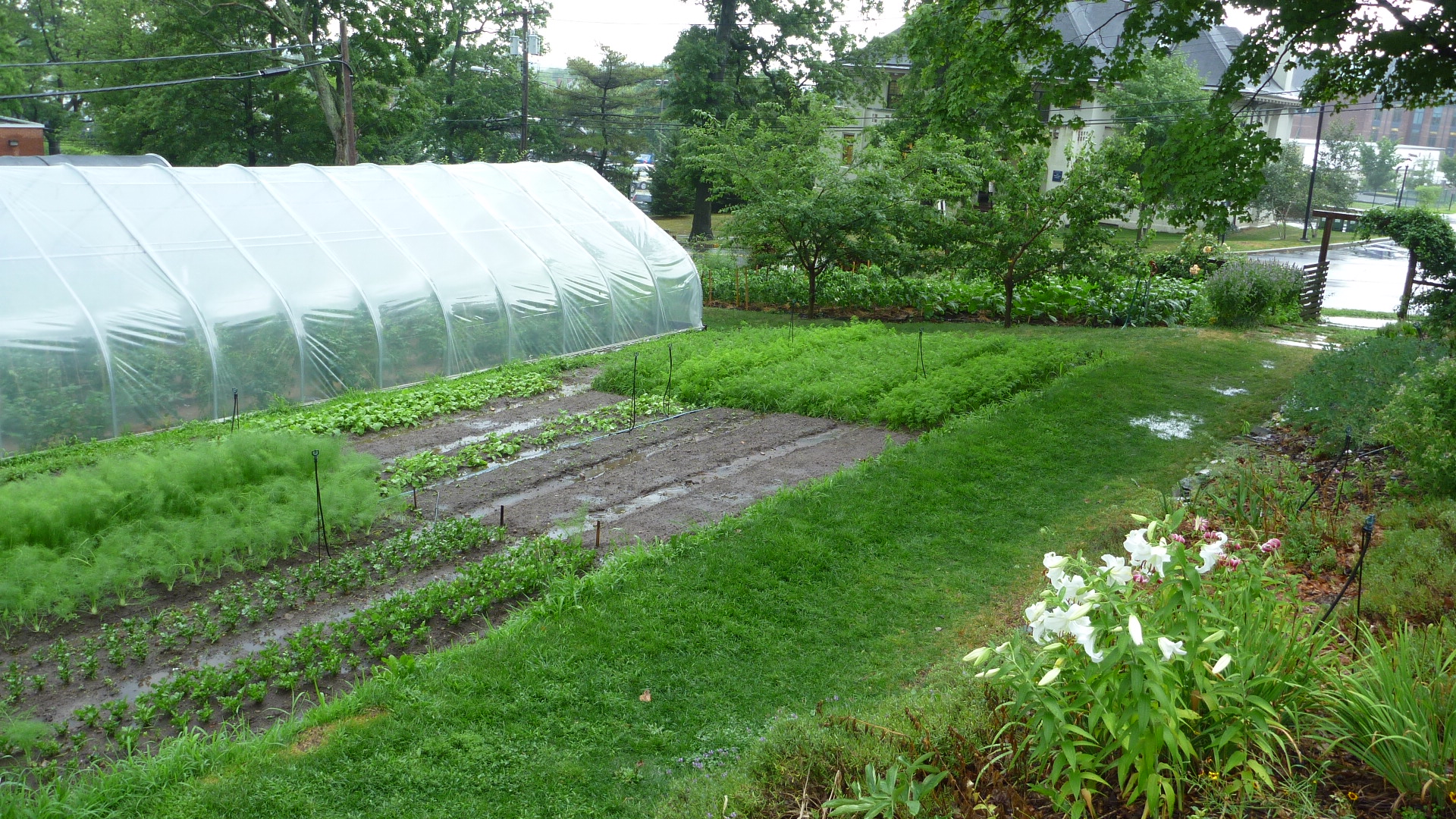
Spring Storm at the Yale Farm showing covered hoophouse

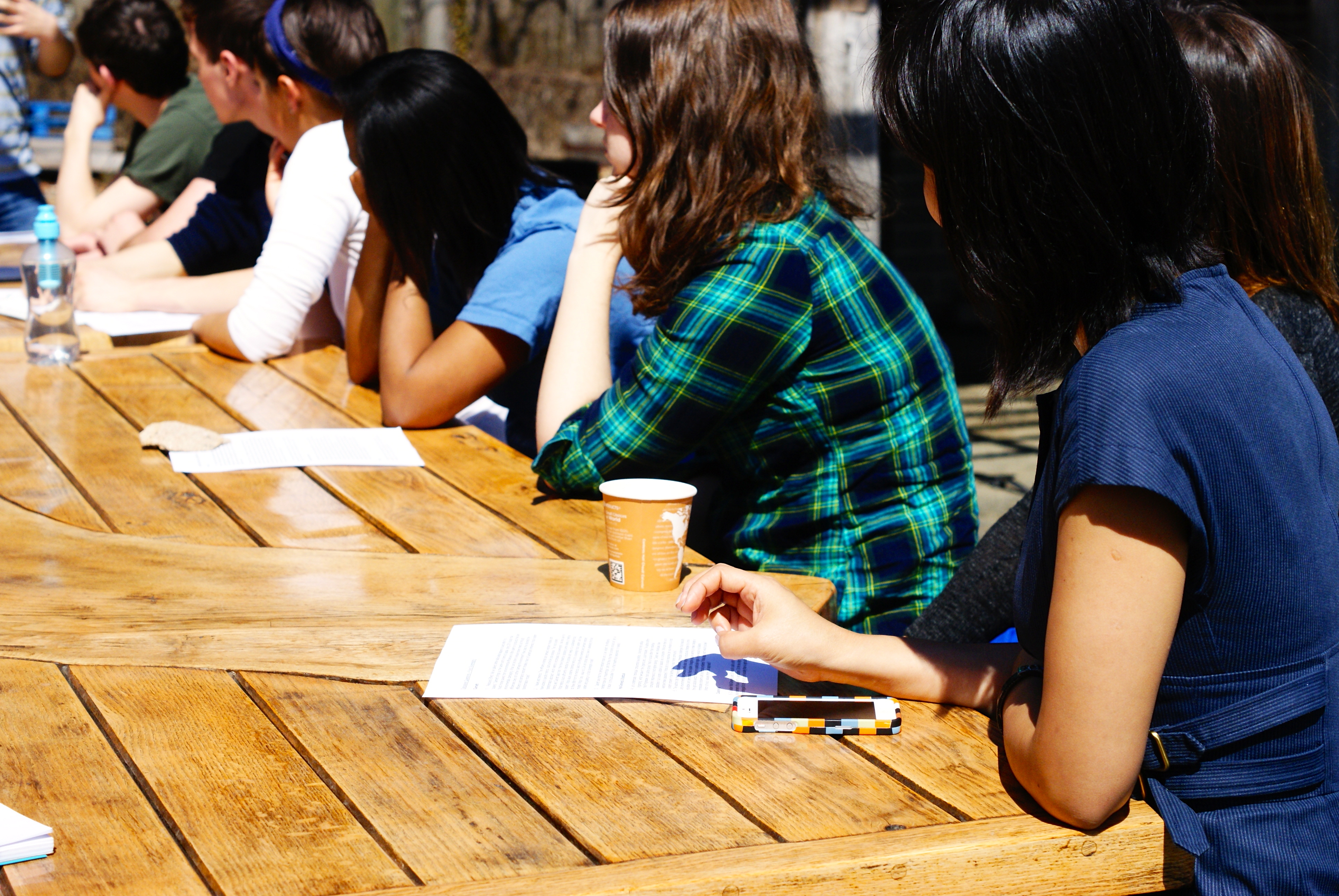
"Sustainable Agriculture" seminar discussion at Yale Farm

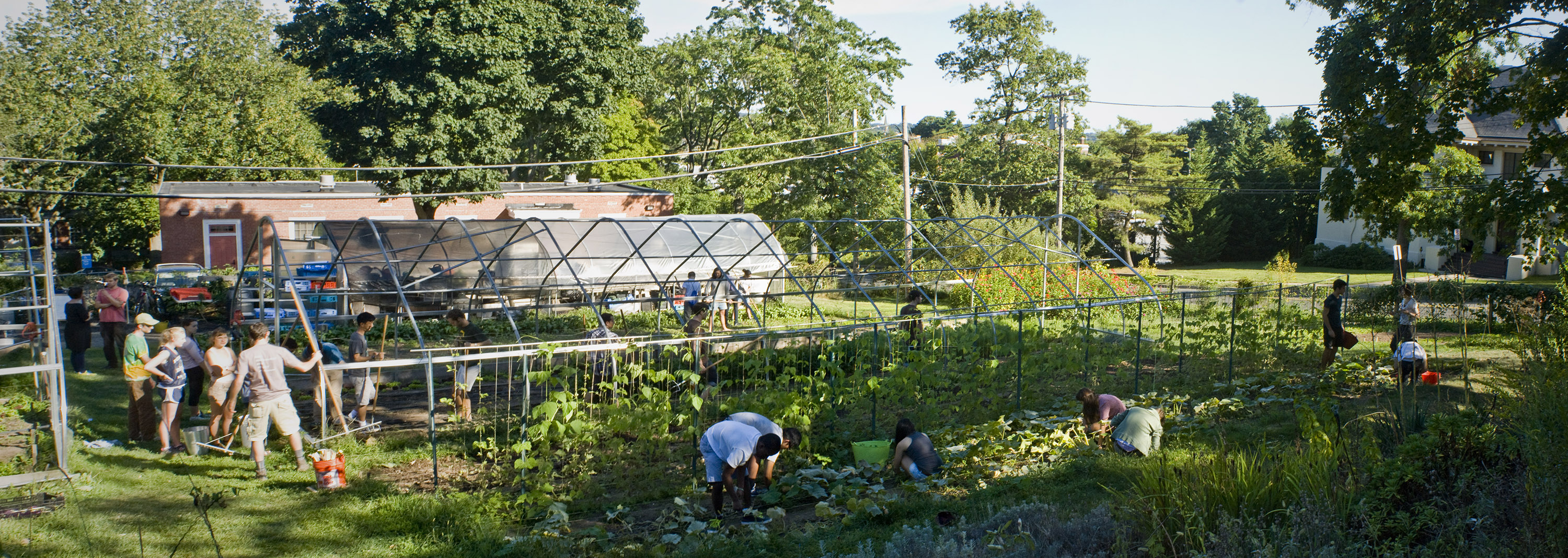
Yale Farm volunteer workday showing un-covered hoophouse

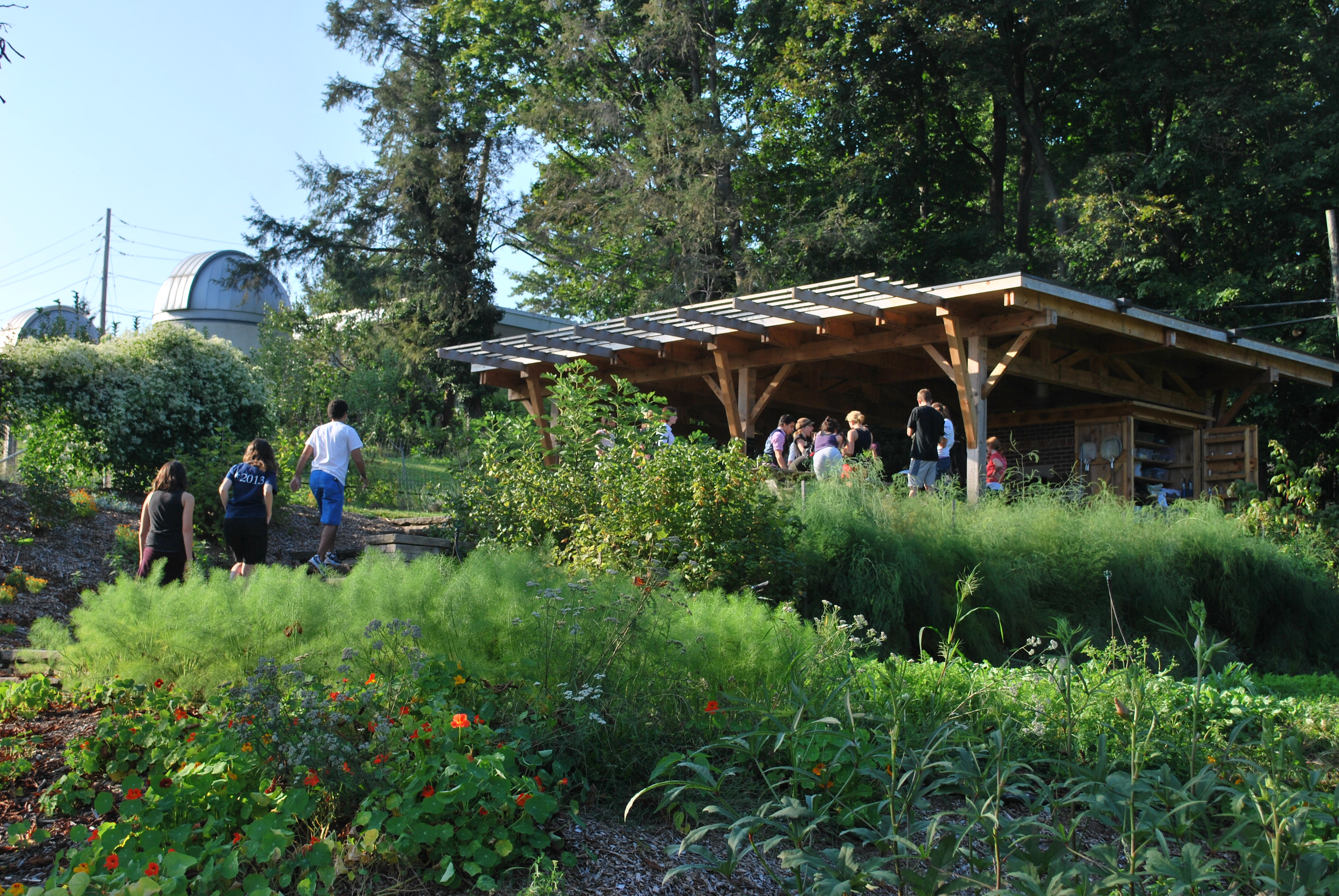
Yale students ascend steps towards the Lazarus Pavilion

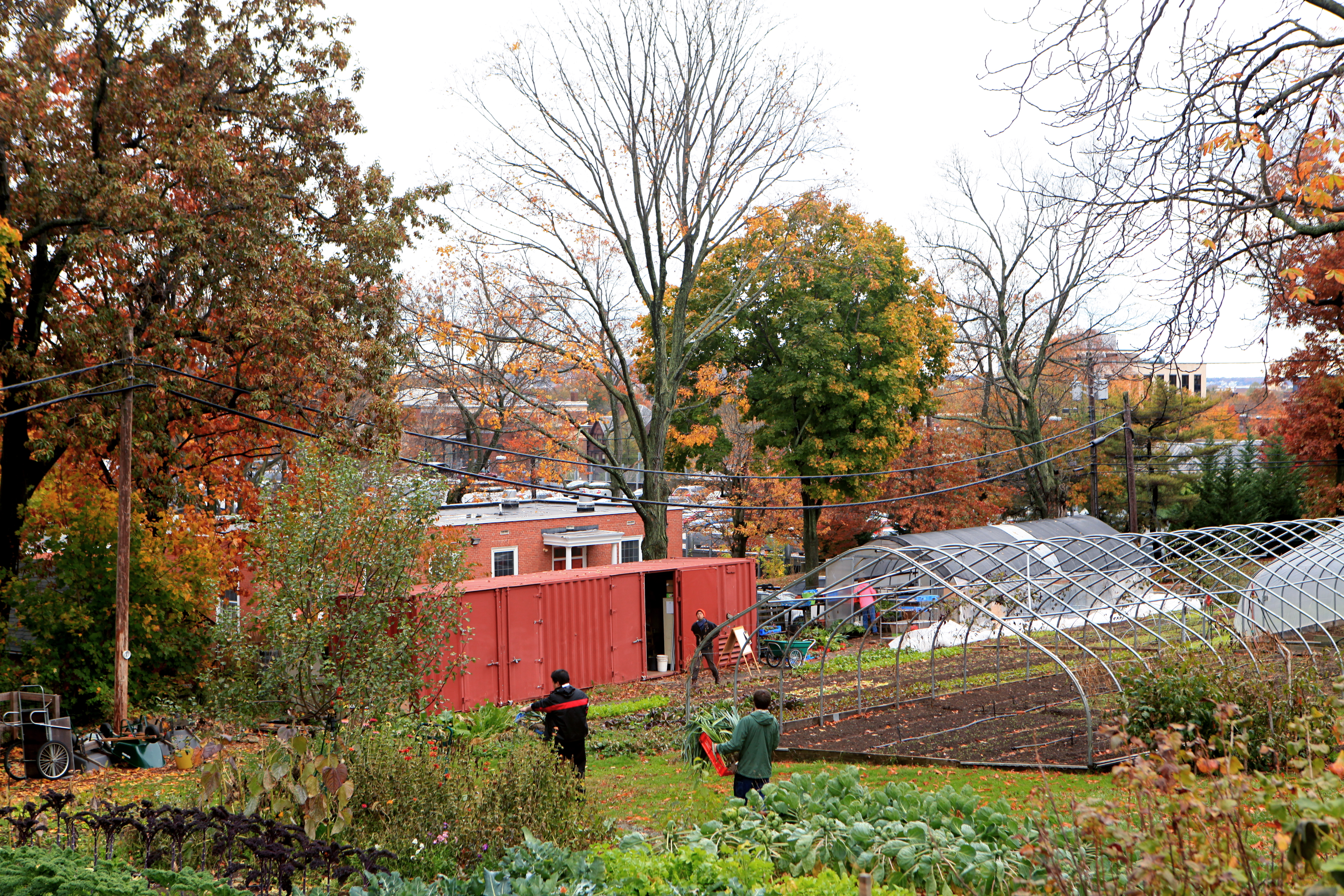
Autumn workday at Yale Farm showing converted shipping container used as tool shed

== Classroom use ==
The Sustainable Food Program is an integral part of the academic experience at Yale. Since its founding, there has been a proliferation of classes related to food and agriculture at both at Yale College and in the graduate and professional schools. For undergraduates interested in rigorous academic study of food, agriculture, and sustainability, the Environmental Studies major now offers a concentration in Sustainable Agriculture. For those with a focus in other fields, the YSFP is frequently the subject of student papers, projects, and theses in a variety of disciplines including psychology, literature, and economics. Students can count on several dozen courses from myriad disciplines to focus on the connections between food, the environment, health, politics, and the global economy.

Throughout the year, public lectures by guest speakers join with culinary workshops and film screenings to offer the Yale and New Haven community a chance to learn more about food and farming. Past speakers have included chefs Alice Waters and Jacques Pepin, authors Wendell Berry, Eric Schlosser, and Michael Pollan, architect Bill McDonough, and food scientist Harold McGee. Culinary workshops at the Yale Farm and in residential college kitchens provide hands-on opportunities for students to learn the art and practice of skills like bread making, fruit preservation, and lacto-fermentation. Films offer another way for people to learn about food and agriculture; past films shown at the Whitney Humanities Center have included King Corn and Black Gold.
