= Heather Gustafson =

American politician

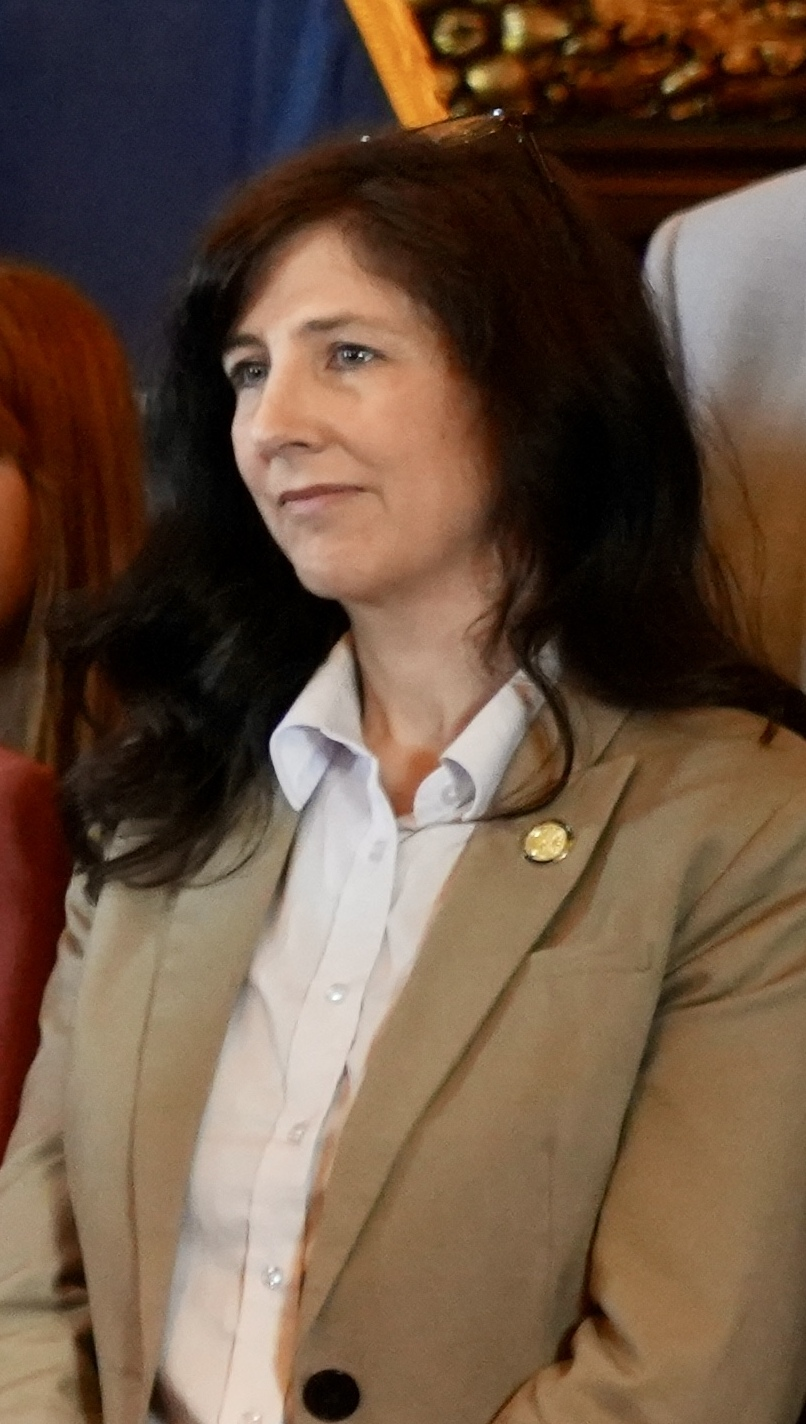
- Gustafson attends May 23, 2025 Pensions Bill Signing

Member of the Minnesota Senate from the 36th district
- Incumbent
- Assumed office January 3, 2023
- Preceded by: Roger Chamberlain

Personal details
- Born: Sartell, Minnesota, U.S.
- Party: Democratic (DFL)
- Education: B.A. Communications, Minnesota State University Moorhead
- Occupation: Teacher; Radio journalist; Legislator

Heather Gustafson is an American politician and educator who has represented District 36 in the Minnesota Senate since 2023. District 36 is in the Twin Cities' northern suburbs and includes Vadnais Heights, White Bear Lake, Lino Lakes, North Oaks, Gem Lake, Circle Pines, Centerville, White Bear Township, and Birchwood Village.

A member of the Democratic–Farmer–Labor Party, Gustafson took office at the start of the 93rd legislature in January 2023. She serves as vice chair of the Senate Education Finance Committee and sits on the Agriculture and Rural Development, Veterans, and Jobs and Economic Development committees.

== Early life and education ==
The elder of two children, Gustafson was born and raised in a small town in central Minnesota. She graduated from Sartell High School.

She attended Minnesota State University Moorhead, where she majored in mass communication, and went on to a career in radio broadcasting in Moorhead, St. Cloud, and the Twin Cities. She later earned her teaching license and a Master of Education degree from the College of Saint Scholastica. She taught for 11 years, mostly in the Centennial School District, until the 2023 legislative session.

== Political career ==
=== Minnesota Senate ===
Gustafson was elected to the Minnesota Senate in November 2022 to represent District 36, a suburban district north of Saint Paul in the Twin Cities metropolitan area. She defeated incumbent Roger Chamberlain in the only 2022 Senate campaign to flip a seat. The Minnesota Star Tribune named her a "political player to watch".

=== Committee assignments ===
- Senate Education Finance Committee (vice chair)
- Senate State and Local Government Committee (vice chair)
- Senate Agriculture and Rural Development Committee
- Senate Veterans Committee
- Senate Jobs and Economic Development Committee

== Legislative record ==
Gustafson has called bipartisan collaboration a hallmark of her legislative approach; over 70% of her authored legislation has had bipartisan co-authors.

=== Food access ===
Gustafson was the chief Senate author of Minnesota's Universal School Meals legislation, signed into law by Governor Tim Walz on March 17, 2023. The law provides free breakfast and lunch to every K–12 student in Minnesota, making the state the fourth in the nation to guarantee universal school meals. The law saves families in her district an estimated $1,800 per year in grocery costs.

Gustafson established and expanded Minnesota's Farm to School program (SF2158, 2023), connecting local farms to school cafeterias, and authored SF3528 to expand the program to include additional childcare facilities. She has continued supporting Farm to School funding in the 2025–26 session (SF1559).

Gustafson authored the Minnesota Food Bank Program (SF4185, 2024) and has continued advocating for food bank and emergency food shelf infrastructure in the 2025–26 session (SF3895).

=== Fraud investigation ===
Gustafson is the chief author of SF856, legislation creating an independent Office of Inspector General (OIG) with authority to investigate fraud, waste, and abuse in state programs.Senator Heather Gustafson Applauds House Committee's Advancement of Legislation to Create a State Office of Inspector General | Minnesota Senate DFL The bill passed the Minnesota Senate on May 8, 2025, with broad bipartisan support (60–7). Gustafson intentionally partnered with a Republican co-author to ensure the office would function independently of any single party or administration. As of 2026, the bill awaits action in the Minnesota House of Representatives.

=== Public safety ===
Gustafson was the chief author of Minnesota's public safety aid package (SF2416), which sent direct, dedicated funding to every city, county, and tribal nation in Minnesota—a first-of-its-kind investment in local public safety in the state's history. The legislation established a new model for how the state supports local law enforcement, emergency services, and community safety programs.

=== Gun safety ===
Gustafson authored two significant gun safety measures:

- Binary trigger ban / straw purchase penalties (HF2609 / SF5153, 2024): Updated the definition of prohibited "trigger activators" (including binary triggers) and increased criminal penalties for straw purchases—the illegal transfer of firearms to persons ineligible to possess them. Also included Bureau of Criminal Apprehension reporting requirements on gun trafficking.
- Safe firearm storage (SF4312 / HF4300, 2024): Established standards for the safe storage of firearms in Minnesota homes and created criminal penalties for failing to meet those standards.

=== Domestic abuse and sexual assault survivor protections ===
Gustafson has authored a sustained body of legislation to protect survivors of domestic violence and sexual assault:

- Surreptitious intrusion (SF294 / HF111, 2023): Senate chief author (with House chief author Kelly Moller) of legislation closing a loophole in Minnesota's "Peeping Tom" law identified by the Minnesota Supreme Court in State v. McReynolds (2022). The law established two new crimes: surreptitious intrusion that does not occur through a window or aperture (e.g., recording a person in their own home without consent), and surreptitious intrusion under or around a person's clothing. The bill passed the House 130–0 and was signed into law in 2023.
- Coerced debt (SF2712 / SF4314): Authored legislation providing legal remedies for survivors who have had debt coerced by an abusive partner.
- Sexual assault exam kit testing timeline (SF2019, 2023): Established a time limit for forensic laboratory testing of sexual assault examination kits.
- Hospital SAFE exam requirement (SF4855, 2024): Required hospitals to provide sexual assault forensic examinations and appropriated funding for this purpose.
- Domestic abuse advocate confidentiality (SF3441/ SF1055): Prohibited domestic abuse advocates from disclosing confidential survivor information.
- Eviction protections for crime victims (SF3748, 2024): Prohibited landlords from evicting tenants who terminate a lease because of their status as a crime victim; modified eviction record expungement to protect survivors.
- Civil cause of action — stealthing (SF662, 2025): Established a civil cause of action for non-consensual removal of a condom.
- Venue for criminal sexual conduct cases (SF4952, 2024): Allowed criminal sexual conduct prosecutions to be brought in multiple counties, removing a geographic barrier for survivors.
- Domestic violence offender registry (SF4873, 2025–26): Authored legislation to establish a statewide registry for repeat domestic violence offenders.

=== Health and safety ===
Gustafson was the chief Senate author of SF450 (2023), which requires manufacturers to disclose when their products contain PFAS ("forever chemicals"), protecting Minnesotans and first responders from toxic chemical exposures.

Gustafson authored SF4600 (2024), requiring Minnesota to adopt updated acceptable blood lead level standards for workers—protecting workers, particularly in construction and manufacturing, from lead exposure.

=== Consumer protection ===
Gustafson authored SF3920 (carried forward as SF4097), Minnesota's "click to cancel" law, signed by Governor Walz on May 21, 2024, and effective January 1, 2025. The law requires that businesses allow consumers to cancel subscriptions and automatic renewals through the same method used to sign up, and mandates clear disclosures of renewal terms. The law also protects consumers' right to cancel gym memberships and club contracts at any time.

Gustafson also authored SF4351 (2024), prohibiting the advertisement, distribution, and sale of vapes designed to resemble school supplies such as pencils, highlighters, and other items marketed to youth.

=== Education ===
Gustafson authored SF4196 (2024), which modified the Teachers Retirement Association (TRA) early retirement reduction factors and increased pension adjustment revenue for school districts. She continued this work in 2025 with SF2000, which made additional TRA provisions modifications.

Gustafson also authored the student teacher stipend program (SF3370, 2024) to help reduce financial barriers for teacher candidates completing their student teaching requirements—a priority she has continued with legislation in the 2025–26 session (SF3333 / SF3334).

== Personal life ==
Gustafson lives in Vadnais Heights with her family.

== Electoral history ==
2022 Minnesota Senate District 36 election
Party	Candidate	Votes	%
Democratic (DFL)	Heather Gustafson	23,348	52.81
Republican	Roger Chamberlain (incumbent)	20,838	47.13
Total votes		44,212	100%
