= Axel Cleeremans =

Belgian research director (b. 1962)

- Born: 5 March 1962 (age 64); Brussels, Belgium
- Education: Université libre de Bruxelles, Brussels; Carnegie Mellon University, Pittsburgh, PA.
- Known for: Implicit learning, consciousness, and artificial neural networks
- Scientific career
- Fields: Cognitive Science
- Workplaces: National Fund for Scientific Research CO3: Consciousness, Cognition and Computation group (director); Université libre de Bruxelles (professor)
- Doctoral advisor: James McClelland

Axel Cleeremans (born 5 March 1962) is a Research Director with the National Fund for Scientific Research (Belgium) and a professor of cognitive science with the Department of Psychology of the Université libre de Bruxelles, Brussels.

== Training ==
Born in Brussels, Belgium, Cleeremans obtained an undergraduate degree in Psychology at the Université libre de Bruxelles, he went on to obtain an MS degree in Cognitive Psychology at Carnegie Mellon University (Pittsburgh, PA). At Carnegie Mellon, he subsequently completed his PhD under the supervision of James McClelland in 1991, on modelling of implicit sequence learning by means of artificial neural networks. Thereafter he returned to the Université libre de Bruxelles, where he worked as a Senior Research Assistant for two years, before becoming head of the Cognitive Science Research Unit in 1993 (currently Consciousness, Cognition & Computation Group), as a Research Associate funded by the National Fund for Scientific Research (currently as Research Director). In 2001-2002 he spent a year as a visiting scholar at the University of Colorado at Boulder.

== Expertise ==
His work, broadly situated within the area of consciousness research, has focused on the nature of the processes underlying incidental (or implicit, or unconscious) learning. Specifically, he focuses on the distinction and/or similarities between how learning with and without consciousness takes place in the brain. His main assumption is that consciousness is a graded phenomenon, and that differences between conscious and unconscious information processing result from graded differences in the quality of the underlying neural representations (e.g., strength, stability, distinctiveness), differences which themselves accrue as a result of learning. Thus, while learning may occur without consciousness, consciousness without learning is not possible.

== Scientific societies and editorial assignments ==
From 1999 to 2009 and since 2011, Cleeremans has been member of the board of the Association for the Scientific Study of Consciousness, and its president since 2020. In 2000, he organized the association's fourth annual meeting held at the Université libre de Bruxelles, Brussels, Belgium. He acted as editor of a book based on the meeting (The Unity of Consciousness: Binding, Integration, and Dissociation, Oxford University Press, 2003). He is past-president of the Belgian Association for Psychological Sciences, and for several years was editor of its journal, Psychologica Belgica. Cleeremans is also past-president of the European Society for Cognitive Psychology, and acted as associate editor for Consciousness and Cognition (2009-2017). In the same year he was elected Member of The Royal Academy of Belgium. Also, June 2009 saw the publication of The Oxford Companion to Consciousness (Oxford University Press), an extensive overview of the field of consciousness research, edited by Tim Bayne, Axel Cleeremans, and Patrick Wilken. Today, he is secretary-general for the National Committee of Psychological Science (Belgium). He is field editor-in-chief of the journal Frontiers in Psychology, a function in which he oversees about 1200 editors.

== Honours and awards ==
- 2009: Member of the Royal Academy of Belgium
- 2011: Laureate of the CHAOS award
- 2014: Grand Officer in the Order of the Crown.
- 2014: Holder of the Francqui Foundation Chair at the Université de Liège (ULiège)
- 2015: Laureate of the Belgian National Fund for Scientific Research (F.R.S.-FNRS) 2010-2015 Quinquennal Prize "Ernest-John Solvay" for the Human Sciences
- 2015-2020: Nominated Senior Fellow of the Canadian Institute for Advanced Research (CIFAR), Brain, Mind, and Consciousness Program
- 2016: Co-laureate, with Emilie Caspar, Julia Christiensen and Patrick Haggard of the Evens Foundation Science Prize
- 2023: Corresponding member of the French Académie des sciences morales et politiques.

== Popularization of science ==
Axel Cleeremans appeared in the 2018 Netflix documentary The Most Unknown on scientific research directed by Ian Cheney.

== Bibliography ==
- Cleeremans, A., Kuvaldina, M., & Allakhverdov, V. (Eds) (2019). Implicit Learning: Fifty years on. Hove: Routledge.
- Bayne, T., Cleeremans, A., & Wilken, P. (Eds.) (2009). The Oxford Companion to Consciousness. Oxford University Press.
- Cleeremans, A. (2005). Computational correlates of consciousness. Progress in Brain Research, 150, 81–98.
- Atkinson, A., Thomas, M., & Cleeremans, A. (2000). Consciousness: Mapping the theoretical landscape, Trends in Cognitive Sciences, 4, 372–382.
- Maquet, P., Laureys, S., Peigneux, P., Fuchs, S., Petiau, C., Philips, C., Aerts, J., Del Fiore, G., Degueldre, C., Meulemans, T., Luxen, A., Franck, G., Van Der Linden, M., Smith, C., & Cleeremans, A. (2000). Experience-Dependent Changes in Cerebral Activation During REM Sleep, Nature Neuroscience, 3, 381–386.
- Cleeremans, A., Destrebecqz, A., & Boyer, M. (1998). Implicit learning: News from the front. Trends in Cognitive Sciences, 2, 406–416.
- Cleeremans, A. (1993). Mechanisms of Implicit Learning: Connectionist Models of Sequence Processing. Cambridge, MA: MIT Press.
