= Sandy Rummel =

American politician

Member of the Minnesota Senate from the 53rd district
- In office January 3, 2007 – January 3, 2011
- Preceded by: Mady Reiter
- Succeeded by: Roger Chamberlain

Personal details
- Born: August 10, 1942 (age 84) Detroit, Michigan
- Party: Minnesota Democratic-Farmer-Labor Party
- Spouse: James Rummel (m. 1977)
- Children: Sara (b. 1979); Daniel (b. 1981)
- Education: Dominican University; University of Iowa; University of St. Thomas
- Occupation: communications consultant, adjunct professor, legislator

Sandy Rummel (born August 10, 1942) is a Minnesota politician and a former member of the Minnesota Senate who represented District 53, which includes portions of Anoka and Ramsey counties in the northeastern Twin Cities metropolitan area. A Democrat, she was first elected to the Senate in 2006, but was unseated in the 2010 general election by Republican Roger Chamberlain. She was subsequently appointed to the Metropolitan Council by Governor Mark Dayton on March 2, 2011.

Rummel was a member of the Senate's Education Committee (of which she was vice chair) and Energy, Utilities, Technology and Communications Committee. She also served on the Finance subcommittees for the E-12 Education Budget and Policy Division, the Environment, Energy and Natural Resources Budget Division, the Environment, Energy and Natural Resources Budget Division-Energy Subdivision, and the Environment, Energy and Natural Resources Budget Division-Natural Resources. Her special legislative concerns included education, environment and natural resources, health and human services, family security, early childhood, jobs and energy.

Rummel graduated from Notre Dame High School in Fairfield, Connecticut, then attended Dominican University in River Forest, Illinois, where she received her B.A. degree. She went on to receive her M.A. degree at the University of Iowa in Iowa City, and her Ed. D. from the University of St. Thomas in Saint Paul. She is a communications consultant, and the owner of RDH Solutions, a communications firm working with health, education and human service organizations. She has also worked as an adjunct professor at the University of St. Thomas.

Rummel has been active on various education-related community boards. She served on the White Bear Lake School Board from 1998 to 2006. For five of those years, she was the board's vice chair. She was a member of the All-State School Board in 2003, and was a community ambassador for the Minnesota School Boards Association. She was also chair of the East Metro Integration District 6067 (EMID), a collaborative effort that fosters voluntary integration among St. Paul Public Schools and nine suburban school districts in the eastern Twin Cities metropolitan area.
