= Garden-based learning =

Outdoor education approach

Garden-based learning (GBL) encompasses programs, activities and projects in which the garden is the foundation for integrated learning, and across disciplines, through active, engaging, real-world experiences that have personal meaning for children, youth, adults and communities in an informal outside learning setting. Garden-based learning is an instructional strategy that utilizes the garden as a teaching tool.

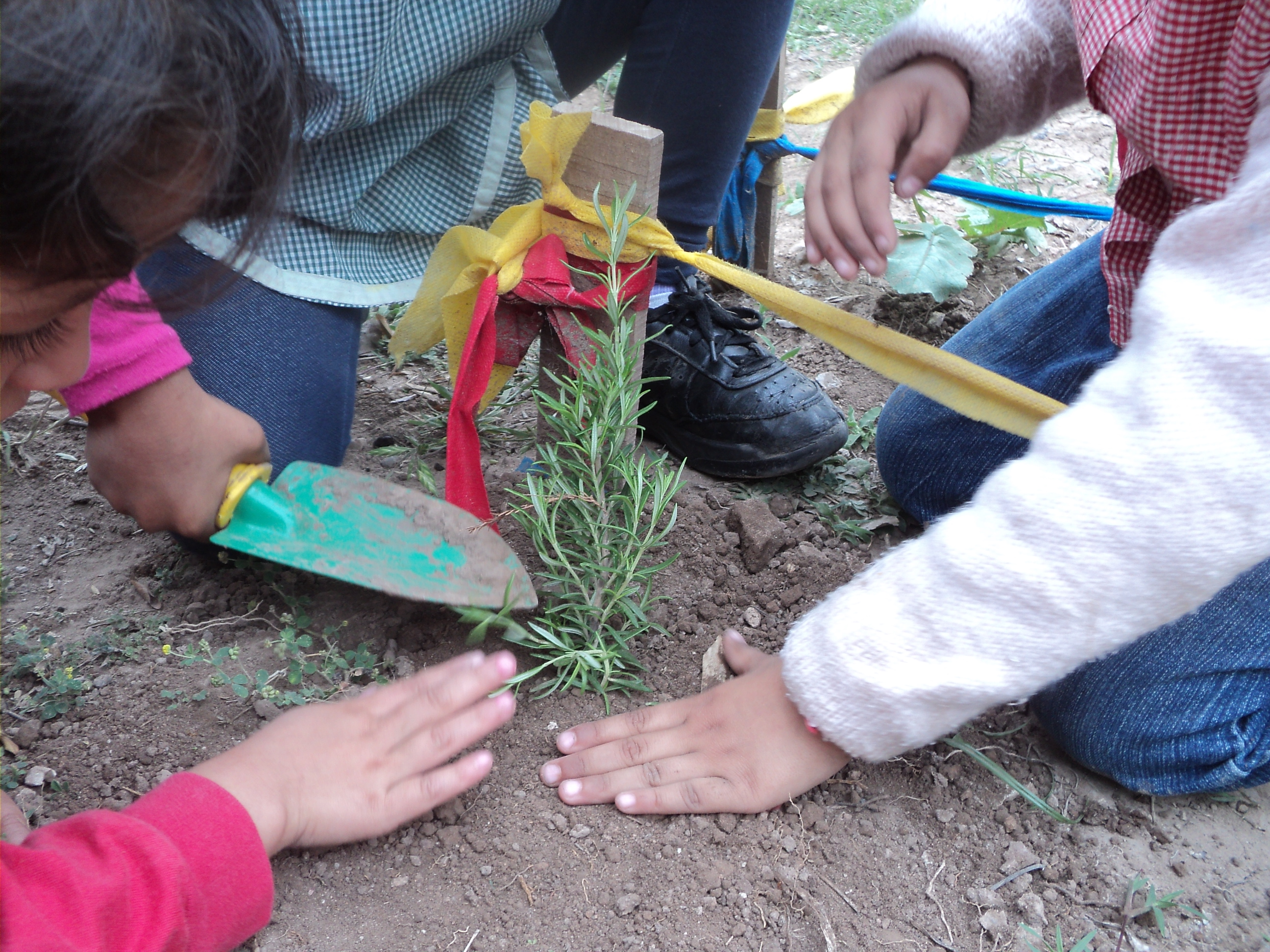
A group of children planting rosemary in a garden

The practice of garden-based learning is a growing global phenomenon largely seen in the United States, the United Kingdom and Australia. As of 2010, the National Gardening Association reported over 3,000 school gardens in the United States alone.

In some settings garden-based learning strategies are used entirely as the educational curriculum for multiple subjects and in others it supports and enriches the curriculum. Garden-based learning can contribute to all aspects of basic education on varying levels depending on the student and consistency of the garden-based learning program. Aspects of basic education benefits include but are not limited to academic skills, personal development, social development, moral development, vocational and/or subsistence skills, and life skills.

== Benefits of garden-based learning among children and youth ==
School and community gardens are often built with the goal of aiding scientific literacy and social skills in children.

Noted benefits of garden-based learning programs among youth include: increased nutrition awareness, environmental awareness, higher learning achievements, and increased life skills.

=== Increased nutrition awareness ===
Research indicates that youth who participate in garden-based learning programs increase their consumption of fresh fruits and vegetables, and gain new enthusiasm for fresh, nutritious vegetables they grow. It is the physical act of having the students' plant their own fruits and vegetables that gives them ownership and gets them more involved in their learning. Students can then learn about the nutritional values of food and multiple ways to prepare their own products in healthy ways to further progress their awareness of health issues. These two examples of physical acts of learning are what motivate healthier eating choices in and outside of the school setting.

==== Student Health ====
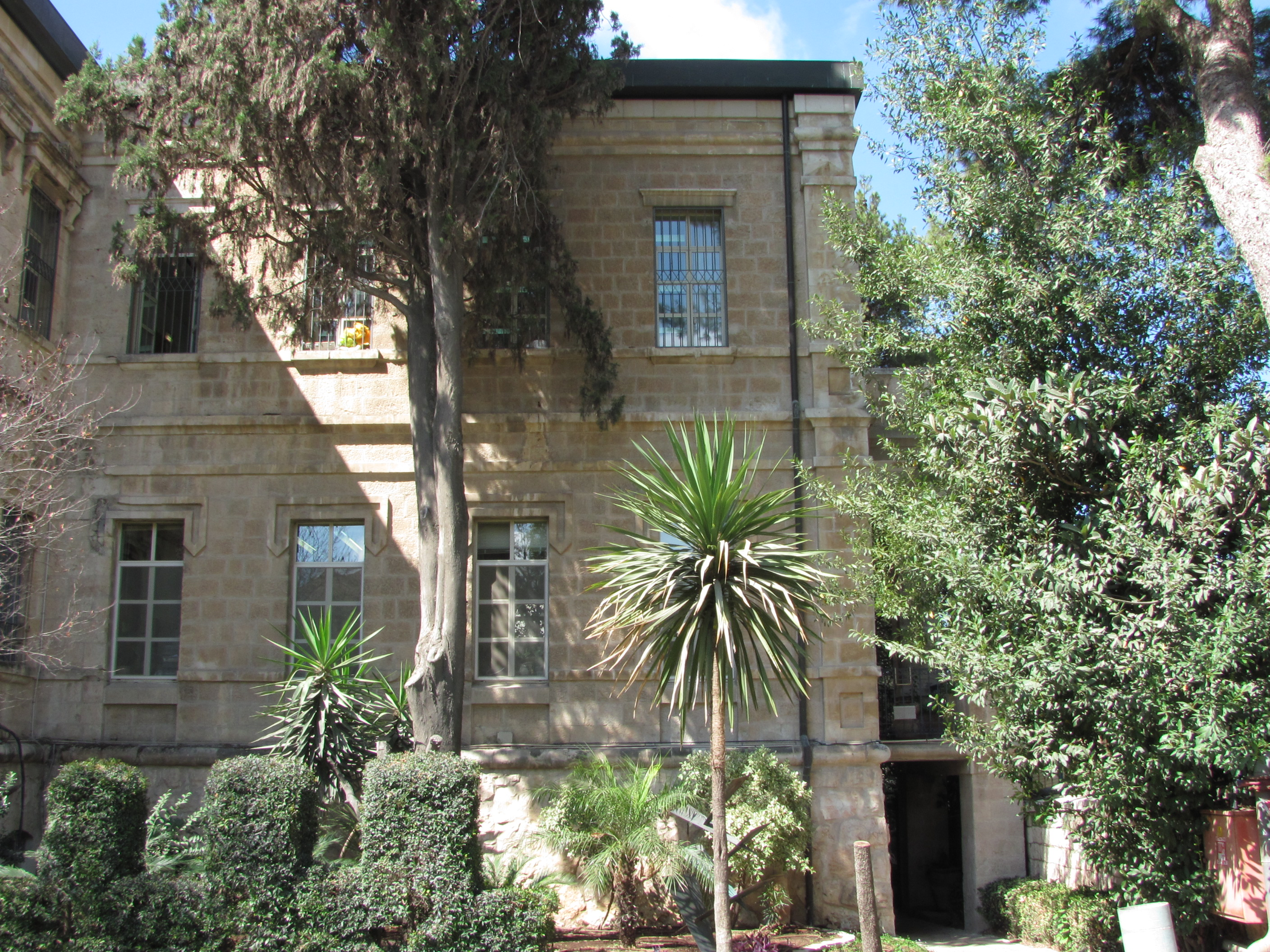
Garden view of the Meyer Rothschild Hospital, established at 37 Street of the Prophets, Jerusalem, in 1888

Teachers also regarded the garden to be very effective at enhancing academic performance, physical activity, language arts, and healthy eating habits. Garden-based learning attempts to combat obesity by introducing students to healthy foods and providing opportunities to for outside experiential learning. Gardening intervention in schools may also aid in the improved health of children for the simple reason that students get 20% or more of their daily food intake from school depending on their socioeconomic backgrounds; families with lower income depending on school lunch even more than others.

Students and teachers have also reported that using GBL programs reduce stress. Reducing stress can result in increased mental health and boosted immune system. A boosted immune system means that the human body is stronger and heals more efficiently. This could help patients recovering from all diseases, wounds, illnesses and more.

=== Increased environmental awareness ===
Research highlights that high school students gain more positive attitudes about environmental issues after participating in a school garden program. Gardening has also been shown to increase scores on environmental attitude surveys of elementary school children.

Environmental attitude surveys generally include statements like the ones shown below and give the opportunity to rank those statements with a score of 1–5 (Strongly agree, agree, neutral, disagree, strongly disagree) The statements differ in complexity based on the grade level.

- I am worried about animals that are going extinct.
- Trying to protect the environment is my responsibility.
- I would come to school on Saturday to plant flowers.

Environmental awareness and attitudes toward the environment is also seen to improve especially in urban schools where the garden-based learning programs in the schools may be some of the only times these students can connect with the outdoors away from city streets.

=== Higher Learning Achievements ===
Studies indicate students that participated in school gardening activities scored significantly higher on science achievement tests compared to students that did not experience any garden-based learning activities. Other research has indicated that weekly use of gardening activities and related classroom activities help improve science achievement test scores. The reasoning behind these improvements is connected to the holistic, integrated, hands-on, project based, cooperative and experiential learning activities that are all aspects of garden based education. In other words, student engagement in class is increased because they are being intrinsically motivated by "real world" experiences in a more informal setting than the classroom.

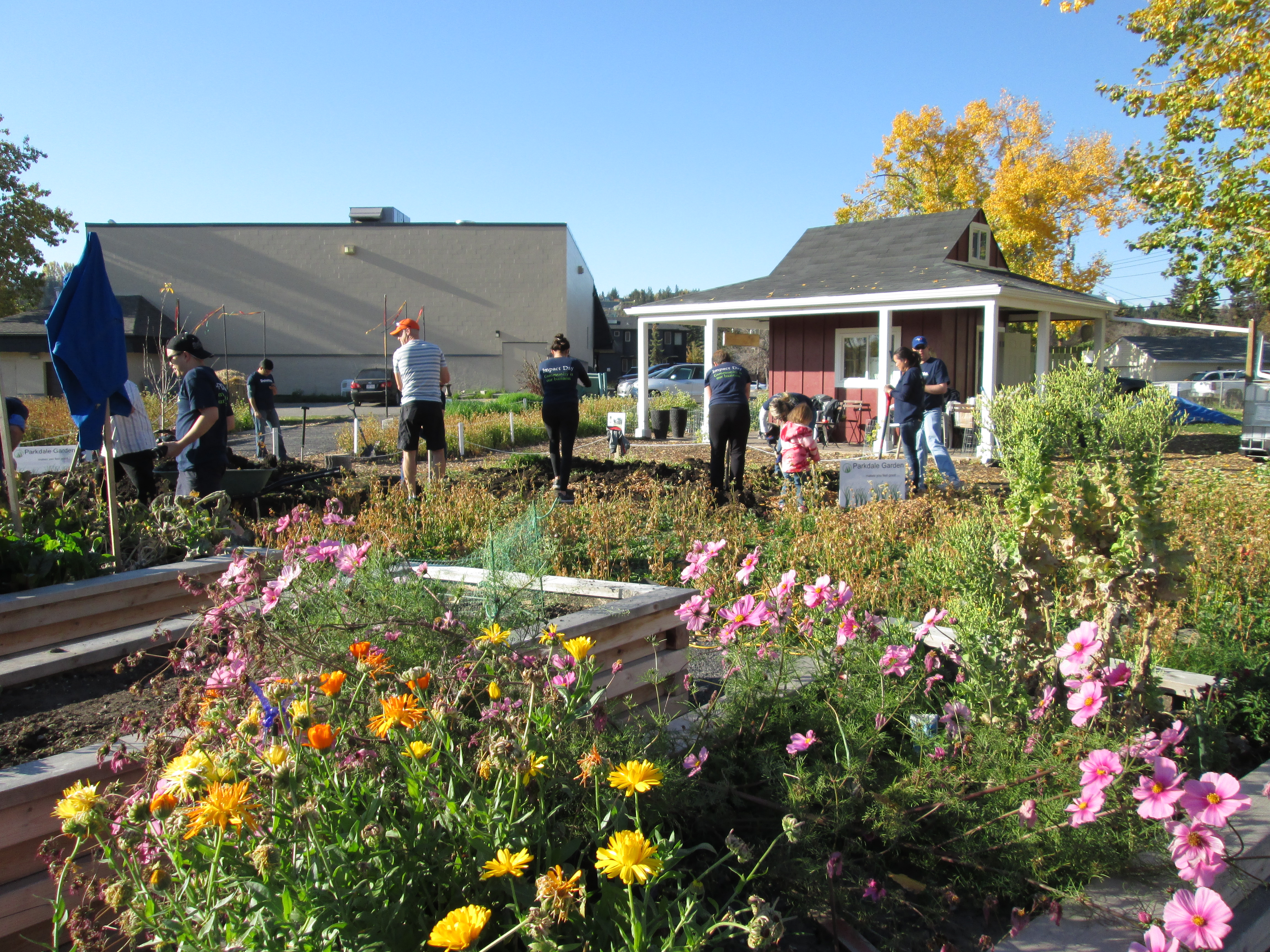
Parkdale Community Garden volunteer day

=== Increased Life Skills ===
Research has highlighted the many improvements in life skills that can be attributed to children's garden programs. These skills include: enhancement of moral education, increasing appreciation for nature, increasing responsibility, developing patience, increases in relationship skills, and increases in self-esteem, help students develop a sense of ownership and responsibility, and helps foster relationships with family members, peers, and their community.

=== Increased Education for the Disabled ===
Research has shown that Garden-based learning can help improve important aspects of learning for people with special needs. GBL is used with special ed students to improve memory and motor skills. Some disabled students are not able to learn outside, but GBL inside has just the same impact as it would outdoors. Hands on projects such as Garden-based learning have been used to access a higher learning level for some disabled or special ed students.

== Keys to successful garden-based learning programs ==
Studies have been shown that children benefit from garden based learning programs. These benefits could include leadership growth, community involvement, and voluntary education which can lead to increased child development. Researched programs are more effective when one is to work through the entire process to understand how everything works in order. The orders involved in this education from beginning to end include planning, design, application, and review.

== Core uses for garden-based learning ==
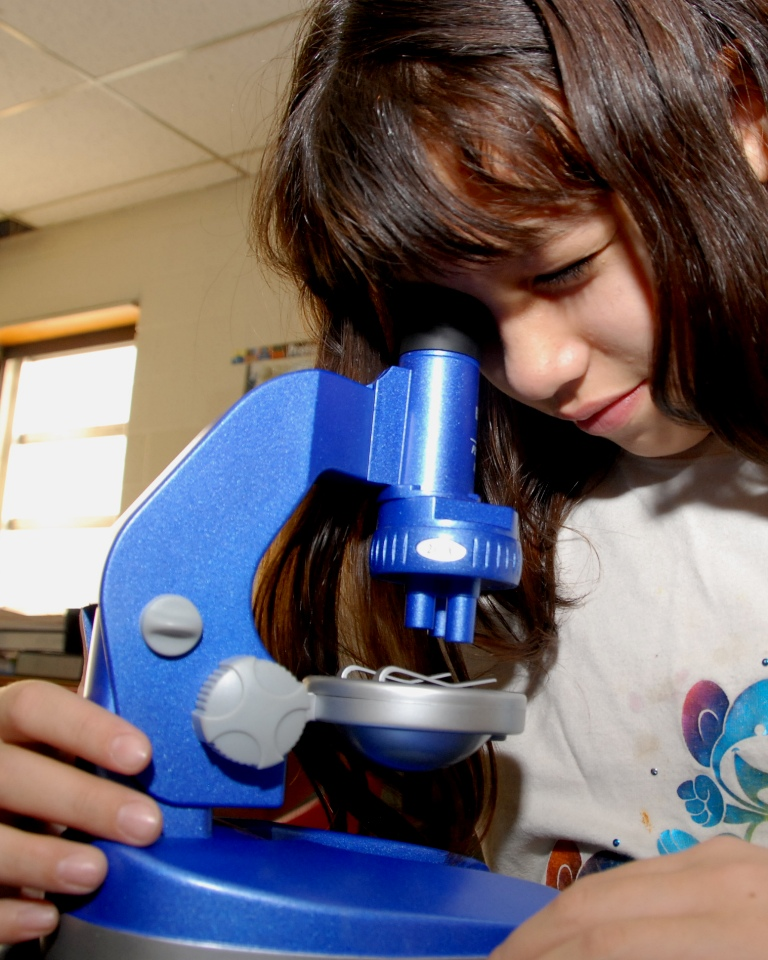
Here, this girl may be examining plant life to further her overall scientific knowledge and skills.

=== Basic education uses ===
Academic Skills

- To support core academic training, particularly in science and math – real world hands on experiences
- Enrichment of core curriculum in language arts through introduction of new learning landscapes
- To support standards based education in countries with national or regional education standards
- Teaching the biology of plant life and how it works.

Personal Development (Mental & Physical)

- To add a sense of excitement, adventure, emotional impact and aesthetic appreciation to learning
- To improve nutrition, diet and overall health
- To teach the art and science of cooking with fresh products from the garden or local farms
- To re-establish the nature of a shared meal

Social & Moral Development

- To teach sustainable development
- To teach ecological literacy and/or environmental education
- To teach the joy and dignity of work
- To teach respect for public and private property

Vocational and/or Subsistence Skills

- To teach basic skills and vocational competencies
- To produce food and other commodities for subsistence consumption and trade
- To produce crops for food and shelter

Life Skills

- To teach about food and fiber production in the garden
- To engage children in community service and environmental care
- To involve students in lessons of leadership and decision making
- To involve students in voluntary beneficial situations
- To improve problem solving
- To improve critical thinking

=== Beyond basic education uses ===
Besides basic education uses, the gardens can be used for other purposes as well.

Community Development

- Gardens often serve as a focal point for community dialogue, capacity building, and partnerships through a shared community garden space.
- Gardens often organize individuals for action – for water delivery, cooperatives, and transportation

Food Security

- Gardens can address hunger at the individual, family, and community levels through planning, growing, and sharing
- Gardens can be the beginning point for teaching and developing food policy

Sustainable Development

- Gardens are an appropriate arena to introduce children to the interconnections that link nature to economic systems and society

Vocational Education

- Gardens represent a historic and contemporary model for developing vocational skills in agriculture, natural resource management, and science

School Grounds Greening

- Gardens provides practical productive strategies to transform sterile school grounds into attractive and productive learning centers through the process of greening
- Hands-on activities in outdoor classrooms make learning more interesting while demonstrating other benefits such as decreased absenteeism and discipline problems
- Can increase cognitive brain development

== Relationship between humans and nature ==
It has been proven that children are spending less and less time outdoors as new technology is invented. This trend has been seen to impact educational and social aspects of the youth. Spending more time outside has been seen to improve test scores and overall concentration. Having green areas is important to increase a students interest in nature and further help them understand compared to learning in a classroom. It has been studied and proven that students learn more when studying 'hands on'. At the same time, teachers and parents begin to realize the ability of education through nature. Parents and teachers are suggested to give kids an hour of play outdoors for every hour indoors. Nature Provides a wide range of materials for creativity among the human race. It is the humans choice to utilize those materials or not, however using those materials will result in a benefit of education.
