= Farm-to-school =

School food program in the United States

Farm to school is a program in the United States through which schools buy and feature locally produced, farm-fresh foods such as dairy, fruits and vegetables, eggs, honey, meat, and beans on their menus. Schools also incorporate nutrition-based curriculum and provide students with experiential learning opportunities such as farm visits, garden-based learning, and recycling programs. As a result of Farm to School, students have access to fresh, local foods, and farmers have access to new markets through school sales. Farmers are also able to participate in programs designed to educate children about local food and agriculture.

Currently, school lunches are generally designed according to the guidelines put out by the USDA National School Lunch Program (NSLP). More than half of US children participate daily, which translates to approximately 28 million lunches distributed per day. The nutritional guidelines for the NSLP lunches are based on "Dietary Recommendations for Americans" composed by the Institute of Medicine. Its requirements are that a school lunch includes one third of the RDA of calories, vitamins A and C, calcium and iron, and protein. Additionally, the lunch should contain no more than 30% of the total calories from fat, and no more than 10% from saturated fat. The guidelines provide unclear recommendations on fruit, vegetable, whole grain, and sodium content. In general, the guidelines leave room for interpretation and do not always lead to the creation of healthy meals. For example, in several schools pizza counts as a vegetable due to its tomato sauce.

Another issue facing schools is the prevalence of other sources of food and snacks, which often make the problem of school lunch nutrition worse. One such source is called “commodity foods” which are free or low cost foods subsidized by the USDA. Of the subsidy money, 73% goes to buy meat and dairy, whereas less than 1% goes to subsidize fruits and vegetables. Schools also may receive “bonus foods,” which are free surplus foods from farms or large-scale agriculture, which also are not typically healthy options for children. Most concerning is the widespread use of “competitive foods,” a term describing foods and snacks offered outside of the auspices of the NSLP. Competitive food includes such items as vending machines (which usually contain high-calorie sugary drinks and sodas, as well as other junk foods), snack bars, and pizza or bake sales.

School lunch nutrition is of particular importance currently due to the emerging childhood obesity epidemic. Using the definition of obesity as having a BMI-for-age of greater than the 85th percentile, approximately 31.7% of American children qualify as being overweight, whereas 16.9% of US children aged 2 through 19 years meet criteria for being obese (with BMI-for-age greater than the 95th percentile). Unfortunately, this epidemic is worsening with an alarming pace — in school-age children, the rate of obesity has increased since 1980 from 6.5% to 19.6%. Given this growing problem facing the nation's youth, school lunch nutrition will play a vital role in halting and potentially reversing this concerning trend. Many initiatives targeted at changes at the school, community and individual levels have been undertaken to combat the growing rates of childhood obesity. Farm to School is one such initiative, and it also has the added benefits of supporting small farmers, local agriculture, and local economies.

== History ==
School food programs have been present in the United States locally since the 1700s, but were first required by law in 1946 by the National School Lunch Act. Since its passage, this law supported childhood nutrition while also making use of federal government commodity purchases to support farmers and protect the agricultural economy. Up to 20% of schools’ food service budgets are supplied by these commodity purchases, often prioritizing availability and short term prices over the nutrition of students. Changes in school funding mechanisms throughout the 20th century led to increased reliance on economical sources of food, eventually resulting in 95% of surveyed high schools in California serving fast food in 2000. Beginning in the mid-1990s several schools independently began farm to school programs, including the Farm Fresh Start in Hartford, Connecticut, Farmers Market Salad Bar in Santa Monica, California, and the New North Florida Marketing Cooperative. The USDA partnering with the US Department of Defense Personnel Support Center also began delivering fresh produce in 1995, before the Community Food Security Coalition formed in 1997 to push for the expansion of farm to school programs nationally. By 2004 the National Farm to School Program had been proposed in the Child Nutrition Reauthorization Act opening the way for the 2010 Healthy Hunger-Free Kids Act and 2015 Farm to School Act to further expand the development of the programs.

While many of the enabling actions in the 21st century occurred on the national level, individual Farm to School programs have relied heavily upon local school officials to find alternative sources of funding, occasionally seeking to become profitable. W.K. Kellogg Foundation has been one major source of that funding, as well as supporting the planning of the national infrastructure since 2005. Attempting to support local, smaller farmers has always been a goal, but costs of supplies and labor can frequently be prohibitive leading to efforts to work around unionized food service workers, making use of nonprofits to support school efforts, and even pre-processing agricultural products offsite before delivery to schools. The development of networks of distributors across the country has continued to be a challenge, as many preexisting distributions and farmer cooperatives see farm to table as a niche market. Use of the free and reduced lunch program, grants, and state funding have enabled the development of farm to school programs in the majority of states in the US.

== The National Farm to School Network ==
The National Farm to School Network (NFSN), established in 2007, began as a collaborative of the Urban & Environmental Policy Institute, Occidental College and the Community Food Security Coalition (CFSC). In late 2011, it was decided that the National Farm to School Network had outgrown its original home and it became its own organization under the fiscal sponsorship of the Tides Center. The National Farm to School Network is as an information, advocacy and networking hub for communities working to bring local food sourcing, school gardens and food and agriculture education into schools and early care and education settings. NFSN includes all 50 states, Washington D.C., Native Communities, and the U.S. Territories; all are represented by Core and Supporting partners.

The Network's six main priority areas are:

1. Policy development
2. Training and technical assistance
3. Information development and dissemination
4. Networking
5. Media and marketing
6. Research and evaluation

== Benefits of Farm to School ==
The Farm to School approach helps children understand where their food comes from and how their food choices impact their bodies, the environment and their communities at large.

Potential benefits of the program for communities, schools, farmers and children include:

- Nutrition education for students
- Participation in school meal program
- Increased consumption of fruits and vegetables
- Improved nutrition
- Reduced hunger
- Obesity prevention
- Local economic development: Each dollar invested in farm to school stimulates an additional

$0.60-$2.16 of local economic activity

- Market opportunities for farmers
- Food security for children
- Decreased distance between producer and consumer
- Influence policy-making at the local and regional levels

Recent studies conducted by Beery et al. demonstrated additional, unexpected benefits from programs similar to Farm to School, as illustrated by the following quotes:

- “Students eating from the farm fresh salad bar lunches took between 90% and 144% of recommended daily servings of fruits and vegetables compared to the students eating hot lunches 40% and 60% of the recommended servings”
- "Experiences from existing programs prove that innovative nutrition education, experiential education, and marketing programs for the salad bar are key to generating enthusiasm about the farm to school programs and maintaining strong participation in the cafeteria meal program"

== Environmental impact ==
Multiple studies have looked at the environmental impact of conventional agriculture versus the local food movement. These studies show that there is not yet a consistent methodology for measuring energy consumption in local versus non-local farms. “Local” is not a clearly defined measurement, and by only examining the energy in terms of “food miles” versus an entire life cycle assessment (LCA), much of the research on local farming is missing key components of the farm-to-consumer process, and the energy consumption involved. For example, despite the amount of greenhouse gases emitted from transporting farm foods to consumers, agricultural soils are also responsible for releasing significant amounts of greenhouse gases into the atmosphere (Schlesinger). The life cycle assessment attempts to measure the impacts of each activity directly or indirectly involved in the production, transport, storage, retail, consumption and disposal of a particular food from “farm to fork” or “farm to waste”. Studies that examine the LCA still show that there is no clear conclusion on the environmental impact of local versus non-local agriculture. A study in Sweden that examined bread production using local flour versus flour from other regions in Sweden found that the smaller scale of local farms results in less energy efficiency5. Another study supports this argument that global food systems have better energy efficiency due to the size of production, the so-called “ecology-of-scale”. Both of these studies are countered by other studies that found lower emissions on small scale bread making facilities, contesting the accuracy of the measurements in the Schilich and Fleissner study. These studies show the inherent variation in farming production, which leads to varying levels of impact on the environment. Other environmental assessments of farming production methods include:

- Water consumption (including contamination of water from surface waterways exposed to feces from cattle and wildlife),
- Use (and production) of fertilizers and pesticides (and the impact of these chemical in ground water),
- Risk of food contamination and infectious agents from longer traveling times from farm to consumer,
- Concentrated animal feeding operations (CAFOs) and the impact on animal and human health,
- And mono-agriculture methods that cause soil erosion and soil nutrient depletion.

Several organizations promoting sustainable agriculture methods have been created on a national and international scale in response to growing concerns about the impact of current farming production methods on the environment, the economy, human health, and animal health combined.

== Economic impact ==
There is a widespread perception that serving healthier meals in schools and doing away with serving typical vending foods such as chips, sodas, and sweets will decrease the financial viability of the school lunch program (CDC). A growing body of evidence indicates that this concern may not be warranted. Though there may be an initial decrease in revenue, most schools have reported an increase or no change in revenue after implementing strong nutrition standards and restricting the sale of unhealthy a la carte foods in pilot studies (CDC). This seems to be due to an increase in school lunch program participation. Additionally, vending contracts are not a significant source of funding for most schools and can in most cases be eliminated without significant financial loss. A la carte foods from vending machines may simply compete with the school lunch program. Stronger restrictions or even eliminating these competing options are most likely to increase participation in the school lunch programs which generally include the healthiest food options.

Advocates of farm to school argue that it will have a beneficial effect on the regional economy but there are few comprehensive analyses that have evaluated this. At least one analysis evaluated the potential economic impact of farm to school programs for an entire region (Central Minnesota) in a comprehensive manner. The investigators empirically developed a realistic set of potential foods to include in farm-to-school lunch programs in the region. Their analysis took into account the impact on output as well as employment and labor income in the regions. Depending on the price paid for the farm foods and how often the farm foods are utilized in school lunches, the regional economic impact ranged from $20,000 to almost $500,000 in their analysis.

Though initial pilot studies and economic analyses provide hope that farm-to-school programs are financially viable options for schools and can also be beneficial to local economies, this research is in early stages and no longer term controlled studies have been completed.

== See also ==
- Environmental groups and resources serving K–12 schools
- Local food
- Garden-based learning
