= East Metro Integration District 6067 =

School district in Minnesota, United States

Coordinates: 45°0′17″N 93°6′1″W

EMID East Metro Integration District 6067 was a special school district in the U.S. state of Minnesota created as a collaboration between Saint Paul Public Schools and nine suburban school districts in the eastern Minneapolis–Saint Paul metro area. EMID is designed to foster voluntary cultural integration among schools in the Twin Cities.

EMID has four components:

== Harambee Community Cultures/ Environmental Science School ==
Harambee is a K-5 year-round elementary school. It gets its name from the harambee tradition of Kenyan community self-help events.

== Crosswinds East Metro Arts and Science School ==
Crosswinds is a 6-10 school in Woodbury, Minnesota. Crosswinds is an accredited International Baccalaureate Middle Years Program School
