= Roger Chamberlain =

American politician

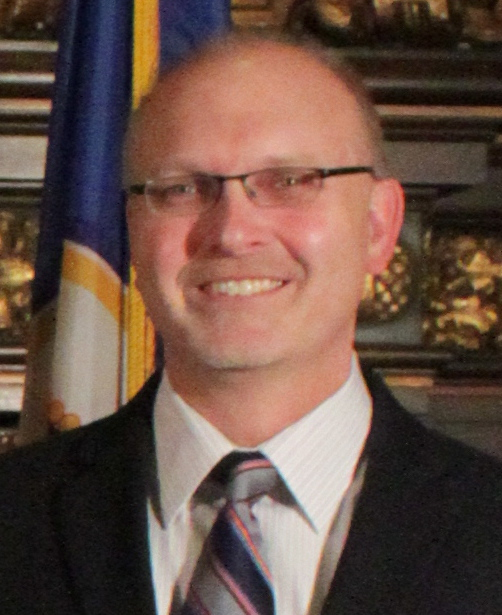

Member of the Minnesota Senate
- In office January 4, 2011 – January 3, 2023
- Preceded by: Sandy Rummel
- Succeeded by: Heather Gustafson
- Constituency: 53rd district (2011–2013)
- Constituency: 38th district (2014–2023)

Personal details
- Born: Roger Colin Chamberlain; January 14, 1963 (age 63)
- Party: Republican
- Spouse: Annette Magnuson
- Children: 2
- Education: Normandale Community College; Metropolitan State University

Roger Colin Chamberlain (born January 14, 1963) is an American politician. A member of the Republican Party, he served four terms in the Minnesota Senate, representing District 53 from 2011 to 2013 and District 38 from 2014 to 2023.

== Early life, education, and career ==
Chamberlain attended Normandale Community College in Bloomington, receiving his A.A.S. in law enforcement. He later earned a B.S. in accounting from Metropolitan State University in Saint Paul. He also served in the United States Navy and in the United States Army National Guard.

== Minnesota Senate ==
Chamberlain was first elected in 2010 from District 53, defeating one-term DFL senator Sandy Rummel. In 2012, 2016, and 2020, he was reelected, representing District 38. In his third term, he chaired the Senate Committee on Taxes. In his fourth term, he chaired the Education Committee and served as assistant majority leader. In 2022, he lost his bid for reelection to DFL challenger Heather Gustafson.

== Political positions ==
=== Abortion ===
Chamberlain opposes abortion. In 2016, Minnesota Citizens Concerned for Life gave him a 100% voting record.

=== Social media ===
In 2020, Chamberlain called the use of social media "addictive", and proposed legislation to require registration and annual fees for large social media companies to operate in Minnesota.

The Minnesota Reformer has criticized Chamberlain's own social media use, in 2020 for following and interacting with Bronze Age Pervert on Twitter and "liking" tweets about the book Bronze Age Mindset, which "argues that equality and human rights are unnatural", and in 2021 for "liking" a tweet by radio host and conspiracy theorist Paul Joseph Watson that read, "Retweet if you're pureblood." The Reformer wrote, "It's not clear whether Chamberlain liked the post because he's into pure bloodlines, or because he's an anti-vaxxer".

== Personal life ==
Chamberlain and his wife Annette live in Lino Lakes and have two children.
