= Otto Wallmark =

Swedish-American politician (1830–1901)

Otto Alexander Bernhard Wallmark (December 12, 1830 – November 20, 1901) was an American politician and businessman.

Wallmark was born in Asige, Halland County, Sweden. He emigrated to the United States and settled in Chisago County, Minnesota in 1854. He lived in Chisago City, Minnesota with his wife and family and was a merchant. He served as the Chisago County Auditor and also served as the postmaster for Chisago City. Wallmark served in the Minnesota Senate from 1887 to 1890 and was a Republican.
