= King Corn (film) =

- King Corn theatrical poster
- Directed by: Aaron Woolf
- Written by: Aaron Woolf; Ian Cheney; Curt Ellis; Jeffrey K. Miller
- Produced by: Aaron Woolf (producer); Ian Cheney (co-producer); Curt Ellis (co-producer)
- Starring: Ian Cheney; Curt Ellis; Michael Pollan; Stephen Macko; Earl Butz
- Cinematography: Ian Cheney; Sam Cullman; Aaron G. Woolf
- Music by: Simon Beins; Johnny Dydo; Sam Grossman
- Distributed by: Balcony Releasing
- Release dates: April 13, 2007 (Wisconsin Film Festival); October 12, 2007 (United States)
- Running time: 88 minutes
- Country: United States
- Language: English

King Corn is a documentary film released in October 2007 that follows college friends Ian Cheney and Curtis Ellis (directed by Aaron Woolf) as they move from Boston to Greene, Iowa to grow and farm an acre of corn. Coincidentally, the trip also takes them back to where both of their families have roots. In the process, Cheney and Ellis examine the trend of increased corn production and its effects on American society, highlighting the role of government subsidies in encouraging the huge amount of corn grown. Furthermore, by studying the food economy through the history of corn in America, the two realize most foods contain corn in some form.

The film shows how industrialization in corn has all but eliminated the image of the family farm, which is being replaced by larger industrial farms. Cheney and Ellis suggest that this trend reflects a larger industrialization of the North American food system. As outlined in the film, decisions relating to which crops are grown and how they are grown are based on government manipulated economic considerations rather than their true economic, environmental, or social ramifications. This trend is demonstrated in the film by the production of high fructose corn syrup, an ingredient found in many cheap food products, including fast food. A study conducted at Princeton University found that the same amount of high fructose corn syrup consumed caused more of a weight gain in rats than regular table sugar. They identify that there is a correlation between the increasing obesity rate and the increasing production of corn syrup. With the new advancement and demand for corn, the traditional farming industry is being replaced by larger corporate farms. By creating the film, the two college friends hope to increase awareness about the consequences of excessive corn production.

== Production ==
Cheney and Ellis were inspired to create the film out of embarrassment—they were college graduates with no knowledge of where their food came from or how it was made. For Woolf, the film presented a new opportunity, one where he could "get [his] hands dirty." One of the biggest challenges the trio faced was raising money for the independent film. They found that people were largely bored with the concept of the film and did not understand their intent. Another obstacle was the stop-animations, which were very time-consuming. A particular issue for Woolf during filming was the shyness of his co-stars, both of whom did not want to be on camera for the first six months of filming.

In retrospect, the trio would have liked to include footage about the environmental consequences of industrial farming. They recall watching as the fertilizer and chemicals they used seeped into the stream neighboring their acre. Climate change is an accompanying issue they regret they were unable to discuss as well.

== Critical reception ==
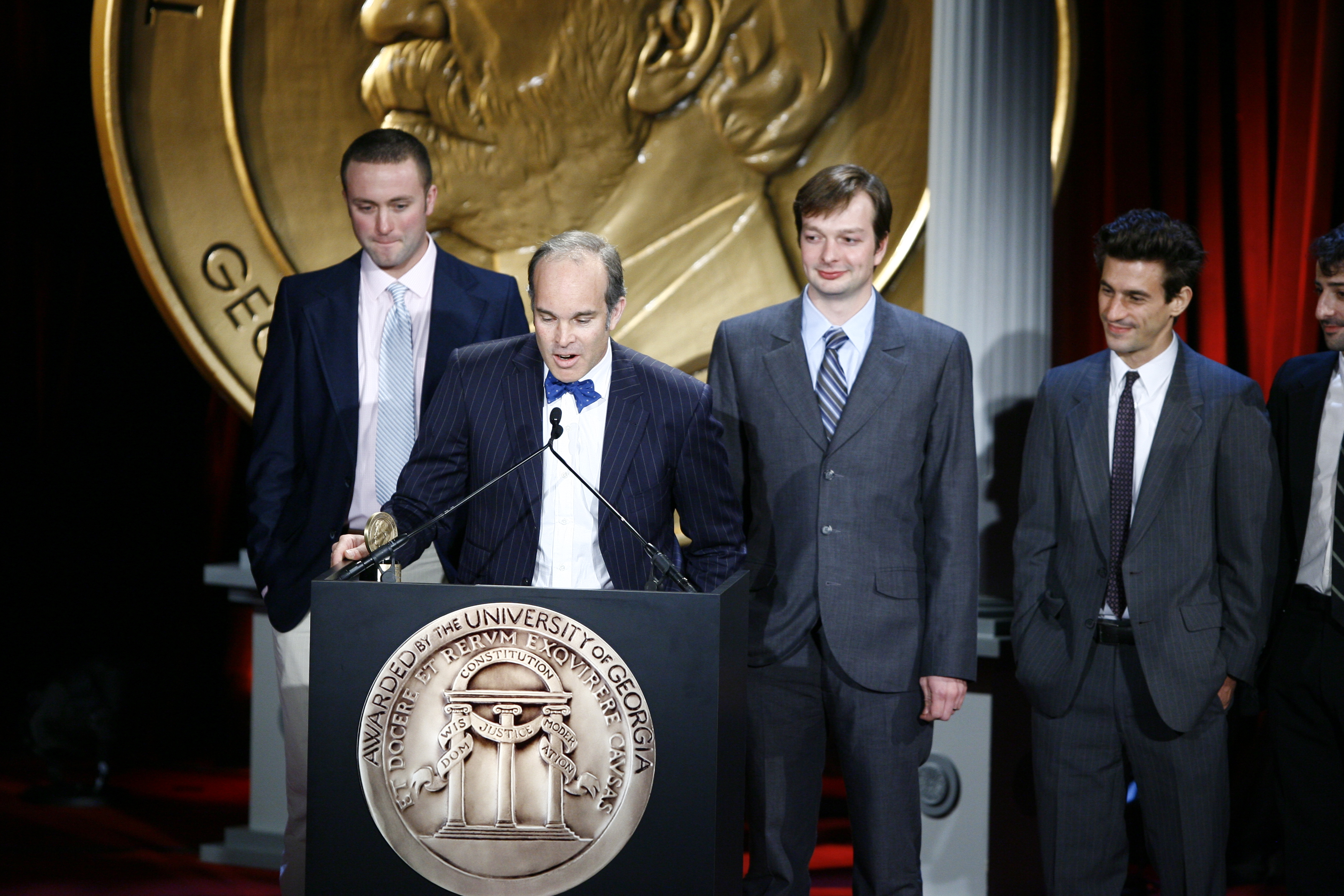
Ian Cheney, Aaron Woolf, Curtis Ellis, and Sam Cullman accept the Peabody Award in May 2009

"King Corn" showed at several film festivals and ultimately aired on PBS's Independent Lens series. By presenting their film on public television, Cheney and Ellis hoped to drastically increase viewership. When Cheney and Ellis showed the film in Greene, Iowa, it received a great reception. The film inspired many locals to take action. On a wider scale, the film has received numerous positive reviews from The Boston Globe, The New York Times, The Washington Post, and many other prominent media outlets. The film, which has been deemed “a deceptively intelligent new entry in the regular-Joe documentary genre” by The Salon, was praised for its subtle criticism of the over production and industrialization of corn in America. Although the film is critical of certain aspects of the production of corn in Iowa, such as high fructose corn syrup, it still demonstrates a profound respect for those peoples who live and work in America's Corn Belt. According to The Boston Globe, the film distinguishes itself from other documentaries for its informal eloquence and “unusual amount of warmth.” Even though the co-producers of the film offer a somewhat comedic and informal narrative throughout the movie, most reviews insist that Cheney and Ellis are still able to convey their critical message. The Washington Post said that the documentary ought to be a “required viewing by anyone planning to visit a supermarket, fast-food joint, or their own refrigerator.” According to Rotten Tomatoes, 96% of critics rated it "fresh."

== See also ==
- Animal, Vegetable, Miracle: A Year of Food Life
- The Jungle
- A Place at the Table
- The Omnivore's Dilemma
- Sicko
- Super Size Me
