= Ian Cheney =

American filmmaker

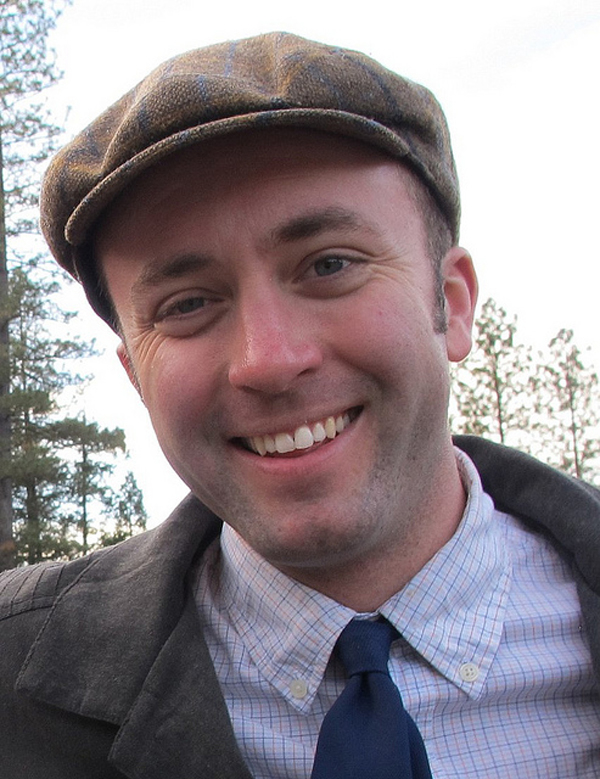
- Ian Cheney
- Occupations: Director, producer

Ian Cheney is an American documentary filmmaker, cinematographer, and producer.

== Early life and education ==
Cheney grew up in Massachusetts and Maine, attended The Mountain School, a semester school for high school juniors, and graduated from Milton Academy in 1998. Cheney received bachelor's and master's degrees from Yale University in 2002 and 2003. He received his Master of Fine Arts in Filmmaking from the Vermont College of Fine Arts in 2018.

== Career ==
He shared a Peabody Award in 2008 for King Corn, which he co-produced and starred in. In 2011, he and longtime collaborator Curt Ellis received the 17th Annual Heinz Award with special focus on the environment, becoming the youngest recipients to receive the Heinz Award. Cheney received an Emmy nomination in 2013 for his film The City Dark, which aired on PBS' POV.

Cheney's 2018 film, The Most Unknown, was released in theaters in May, then on Netflix in 25 languages in the summer, and finally posted in nine individual episodes in YouTube.

Cheney runs Wicked Delicate Films, a documentary film production company based in Maine. He is a co-founder and former member of the board of directors of the FoodCorps non-profit organization. He is the brother of poet Colin Cheney.

His film The Long Coast premiered at a virtual version of the Camden International Film Festival in October 2020.

His most recent films include Picture a Scientist (2020), The Arc of Oblivion (2023), Shelf Life (2024) and Observer (2025). He has completed fourteen feature-length documentaries.

== Filmography ==
- King Corn (2007), Co-creator, Co-producer, Cinematographer, Writer
- The Greening of Southie (2009), Director, Editor
- Truck Farm (2011), Director
- The City Dark (2012), Director
- The Melungeons (2013), Director
- The Search for General Tso (2014), Director
- Bluespace (2015), Director
- The Smog of the Sea (2017), Director
- The Most Unknown (2018), Director
- The Emoji Story (2019), Director
- Thirteen Ways (2019), Director
- Picture a Scientist (2020), Director
- The Long Coast (2020), Director
- Postcards from Vershire (2021), Director
- The Arc of Oblivion (2023), Director
- Shelf Life (2024), Director
- Observer (2025), Director
- The Last Class (2025), Executive Producer
