= Airport authority =

Type of entity responsible for Airport operations

An airport authority is an entity responsible for the operation and oversight of an airport or group of airports. The Airports Council International is the world trade association of airport authorities. In some countries, when the authority of an entity encompasses more than just the airports in an area, harbor and rail facilities for example, the entity may be referred to as a port authority.

== Legal forms and structures ==
In the United States, authorities are often governed by a group of airport commissioners, who are appointed to lead the authority by a government official. In Canada, airport authorities usually refer to private (not government owned or affiliated) not-for-profit companies that are established to manage a city's commercial airports.

== Examples of airport authorities overseeing multiple airports ==
| Airport authority | Country | Airports |
|---|---|---|
| Edmonton Airports | Canada | Edmonton International Airport, Edmonton/Villeneuve Airport |
| Aéroports de Paris | France | 14 airports near Paris |
| Airport Authority Hong Kong | Hong Kong, China | Hong Kong International Airport, Hangzhou Xiaoshan International Airport, Zhuhai Sanzao Airport |
| Airports Authority of India | India | All airports in India, including: 12 international airports, 89 domestic airports, 26 enclave airports |
| Angkasa Pura I | Indonesia | 16 airports in central and eastern Java, Bali, eastern and southern Kalimantan, Batam, Lesser Sunda Islands, northern and southern Sulawesi, Maluku, Papua |
| Angkasa Pura II | Indonesia | 20 airports in Sumatra, Jakarta, West Java, Banten, Purbalingga, Banyuwangi, western and central Kalimantan |
| Kansai Airports | Japan | Kansai International Airport, Itami Airport, Kobe Airport |
| Malaysia Airports | Malaysia, Turkey | 39 airports in Malaysia, 1 international airport in Turkey |
| Pakistan Airports Authority | Pakistan | All airports and airstrips in Pakistan |
| AENA | Spain | 46 airports and 2 heliports in Spain |
| Airports of Thailand | Thailand | Suvarnabhumi Airport, Don Mueang International Airport, Phuket International Airport, Chiang Mai International Airport, Chiang Rai International Airport, Hat Yai International Airport |
| Dubai Airports Company | United Arab Emirates | Dubai International Airport, Al Maktoum International Airport |
| Columbus Regional Airport Authority | United States | John Glenn Columbus International Airport, Rickenbacker International Airport, Bolton Field |
| Jacksonville Aviation Authority | United States | Jacksonville International Airport, Craig Municipal Airport, Herlong Airport, Cecil Field |
| Greater Orlando Aviation Authority | United States | Orlando International Airport, Orlando Executive Airport |
| Allegheny County Airport Authority (ACAA) | United States | Pittsburgh International Airport, Allegheny County Airport |
| Indianapolis Airport Authority | United States | Eagle Creek Airpark, Indianapolis International Airport, Indianapolis Metropolitan Airport, Indianapolis Regional Airport (Mount Comfort) |
| Massachusetts Port Authority (Massport) | United States | Boston Logan International Airport, L.G. Hanscom Field, Worcester Regional Airport |
| Metropolitan Airports Commission | United States | Minneapolis-Saint Paul International Airport, Airlake Airport, St. Paul Downtown Airport, Anoka County-Blaine Airport, Crystal Airport, Flying Cloud Airport, Lake Elmo Airport |
| Metropolitan Nashville Airport Authority (MNAA) | United States | Nashville International Airport, John C. Tune Airport |
| Metropolitan Washington Airports Authority (MWAA) | United States | Washington Reagan National Airport, Washington Dulles International Airport |
| Omaha Airport Authority | United States | Omaha Eppley Airfield, Millard Airport |
| Port Authority of New York and New Jersey | United States | John F. Kennedy International Airport, LaGuardia Airport, Newark Liberty International Airport, Stewart International Airport, Teterboro Airport |
| Wayne County Airport Authority | United States | Detroit Metropolitan Wayne County Airport, Willow Run Airport |
