= Baytown Township Ground Water Plume =

Coordinates: 45°0′N 92°50′W

The Baytown Township Groundwater Plume is a Superfund site located east of the village of Lake Elmo, Minnesota, United States. The plume extends into Baytown and West Lakeland Townships and continues eastward approximately four miles to the St. Croix River. Baytown Township is a rapidly developing rural/suburban residential area on the eastern edge of the Minneapolis-St. Paul metropolitan area. The contaminated groundwater is primarily in the Prairie du Chien-Jordan aquifer, which is the major source of drinking water for many residents in the area through private and residential wells. The Lake Elmo Airport is located near the western end of the plume and is administered by the Metropolitan Airports Commission (MAC). An estimated 8,000 people live in the area; 80 percent of the residents use private wells for their water supply.

== Threats and contaminants ==
There are two volatile organic compounds of concern in the groundwater contaminant plume - trichloroethylene (TCE) and carbon tetrachloride. The Minnesota Pollution Control Agency (MPCA) believes that use of the chlorinated solvent TCE at a former metal working facility at the location of the Hagberg Country Market was the major source of site ground water contamination. The use of TCE at the Lake Elmo airport likely also have caused some of the TCE groundwater contaminant plume. On the north side of the plume there are a few former grain storage bins which MPCA believes were the potential source of carbon tetrachloride that was previously detected in that area of the plume.

== Cleanup progress ==
The Minnesota Department of Health (MDH) first detected TCE in private wells in 1987. Between 1987 and 2003, the MPCA, MDH, MAC, and the Washington County Department of Health collected thousands of samples from private wells. MDH conducted a public health assessment and created a well advisory area. MPCA and MAC have installed over 30 monitoring wells in the area. MPCA signed a Record of Decision in 2000 which calls for cleanup in three areas: the groundwater plume and private wells; the city of Bayport municipal well #2; and the source area.

The remedy for the groundwater plume and private wells includes plume monitoring and installation and maintenance of granular activated carbon (GAC) treatment units for private wells that exceed 5 micrograms per liter (ug/L or "parts per billion") TCE. Installation of GAC units has been completed at approximately 125 existing wells. The plume currently appears to be stable; however, a small number of additional units may be needed annually due to new home construction or interior plume variation. If the health-based limit for TCE is lowered in the future, GAC units would be needed at additional residential wells. The site currently is undergoing a groundwater optimization study by the U.S. Army Corps of Engineers under contract to the United States Environmental Protection Agency to be completed in winter 2011.
