= Jeff Backer =

American politician

Member of the Minnesota House of Representatives from the 9A district
- Incumbent
- Assumed office January 6, 2015
- Preceded by: Jay McNamar

Personal details
- Born: January 3, 1967 (age 59) Browns Valley, Minnesota, U.S.
- Party: Republican
- Spouse: Judy
- Children: 1
- Education: St. Cloud State University (BS)
- Occupation: Small business owner; Legislator
- Website: Government website Campaign website

Jeff Backer Jr. (born January 3, 1967) is an American politician serving in the Minnesota House of Representatives since 2015. A member of the Republican Party of Minnesota, Backer represents District 9A in western Minnesota, which includes the city of Fergus Falls, Grant, Traverse, and Wilkin Counties, and parts of Otter Tail County.

Backer was Woodbury Mayor Mary Giuliani Stephens' pick for lieutenant governor in the Republican primary for the 2018 Minnesota gubernatorial election; the pair withdrew from the race during the Republican party state convention.

== Early life, education, and career ==
Backer was born and raised in Browns Valley, Minnesota and graduated from Browns Valley High School. He attended St. Cloud State University, earning a Bachelor of Science degree in chemistry and public administration.

Backer has served as a volunteer EMT for Browns Valley Ambulance since 1995. Backer was a member of the Minnesota Board of Peace Officer Standards and Training from 2007 to 2010. He served as a member of the Browns Valley school board, and was elected to Browns Valley City Council in 2000. Backer was elected mayor in 2004 and served until 2010. Backer was mayor during a major flood in 2007 in Browns Valley and sought federal and state disaster assistance, eventually receiving $2 million in flood relief from the state legislature. Following the flood, Backer led efforts on a flood prevention and control project.

== Minnesota House of Representatives ==
Backer was elected to the Minnesota House of Representatives in 2014 and has been reelected every two years since. He defeated one-term DFL incumbent Jay McNamar. Backer dubbed his opponent "Metro Jay" and attacked him for his votes on taxes, increasing the minimum wage, and to legalize protections for same-sex marriage.

Backer serves as the minority lead for the Legacy Finance Committee, and also sits on the Health Finance and Policy and Human Services Policy Committees.

=== Agriculture and the environment ===
Backer has opposed environmental protections and agricultural regulations, calling them "reckless" and "irresponsible". He sponsored bills to limit the authority of Governor Mark Dayton's administration to make rules on farm fertilizers, and criticized Dayton's executive orders to protect pollinators. Backer advocated requiring departments get legislative approval before making new regulations and rules.

=== Other political positions ===
Backer opposed measures to raise the minimum wage in Minnesota. He attacked Governor Dayton for his commitment to the Southwest light rail project. Backer was a member of a task force to reform child protection laws, and supported a 2018 bill to extend funding for mental health care for children. He signed on to a letter calling on the University of Minnesota to stop participating in research on "aborted human fetal organs," and signed on to a letter calling on Attorney General Lori Swanson to investigate Planned Parenthood for allegedly selling fetal body parts. Backer praised a bill passed by the House in December 2020 providing aid to deal with the COVID-19 pandemic.

== Electoral history ==
2014 Republican Primary for Minnesota State House - District 12A
Party	Candidate	Votes	%
Republican	Jeff Backer	1,777	55.55
Republican	Nancy A. Taffe	1,422	44.45
Total votes		3,199	100.0

2014 Minnesota State House - District 12A
Party	Candidate	Votes	%
Republican	Jeff Backer	8,725	51.85
Democratic (DFL)	Jay McNamar (incumbent)	8,065	47.93
Write-in		38	0.23
Total votes		16,828	100.0
Republican gain from Democratic (DFL)			

2016 Minnesota State House - District 12A
Party	Candidate	Votes	%
Republican	Jeff Backer (incumbent)	13,021	60.46
Democratic (DFL)	Jay McNamar	8,498	39.46
Write-in		17	0.08
Total votes		21,536	100.0
Republican hold			

2018 Minnesota State House - District 12A
Party	Candidate	Votes	%
Republican	Jeff Backer (incumbent)	11,382	62.02
Democratic (DFL)	Murray Smart	6,959	37.92
Write-in		10	0.05
Total votes		18,351	100.0
Republican hold			

2020 Minnesota State House - District 12A
Party	Candidate	Votes	%
Republican	Jeff Backer (incumbent)	14,769	66.87
Democratic (DFL)	Murray Smart	7,299	33.05
Write-in		17	0.08
Total votes		22,085	100.0
Republican hold			

2022 Minnesota State House - District 9A
Party	Candidate	Votes	%
Republican	Jeff Backer (incumbent)	12,248	66.30
Democratic (DFL)	Nancy Jost	6,172	33.41
Write-in		54	0.29
Total votes		18,474	100.0
Republican hold			

== Personal life ==
Backer lives in Browns Valley, Minnesota with his wife, and has one child. Backer taught fifth and sixth grade release time at Browns Valley's Zion Lutheran Church, where he is an active member. He is a member of the Browns Valley Lions Club.
