= Walter R. Scott =

Author, photographer, and self-publisher

Walter R. Scott Sr.
- Born: June 4, 1929; Greenville, Mississippi
- Died: 2001 (aged 71–72)

Walter R. Scott Sr. (June 4, 1929 – 2001) was an author, photographer and self-publisher of the books Minneapolis Beacon, Minneapolis Negro Profile, and Minnesota's Black Community which celebrated and documented Minnesota's African-American community.

== Biography ==
Walter R. Scott Sr. was born in Greenville, Mississippi. His father was a relative of Kansas City Royals player George Scott. His family moved to Chicago when he was young and he graduated from DuSable High School. Around the same time, his mother passed away.

Scott moved to Minneapolis in 1949 where his uncle preached at the St. James African Methodist Episcopal Church. Scott became a night watchman at Northwestern Bell and eventually became the company's first Black human resources personnel manager. He later worked for the Metropolitan Airports Commission, from which he retired in 1995.

He was a member of the Nacirema Club, and was part of a group of four black news publishers in the Twin Cities along with Cecil Newman, Mary Kyle, and Jeanne Cooper.

Scott died in 2001.

== Writing ==
Scott wrote, photographed, and self-published three volumes of pictures and writing about the Twin Cities African American community: The Centennial Edition of the Minneapolis Beacon (1956), Minneapolis Negro Profile (1968), and Minnesota's Black Community (1976). His works reflected the community of businesspeople, artists, educators, athletes, and other public figures, and showed the reader everyday life in black homes, schools, neighborhoods, and businesses. When publishing Minnesota's Black Community during the bicentennial, he said:

"It is unfair to the nearly 50,000 Blacks now living in Minnesota to hide their historical link to the state. It is equally a disservice to White Minnesotans who are anxious to know more about their fellow Black citizens."

— Walter Scott Sr.

Scott included Minnesota Historical Society photographs and information in his books, and employed local Black photographers such as Charles Chamblis and Ronnie Lloyd. His family estimates over 5,000 copies were sold. Scott self-published his works through his Scott Publishing Company.

Scott also put out smaller, magazine-sized periodicals. In all his publications, he cut and pasted the gallery proofs by hand at home. The books were distributed hand-to-hand and they were featured in the Twin Cities African-American newspapers.

In 2018, Scott's family worked with the Minnesota Historical Society to re-publish his three volumes of writing under the title The Scott Collection. The collection included essays by his son Anthony Scott, his daughter Chaundra Scott, and Augsburg College professor William Green. The re-published edition consisted of one of the most extensive photo compilations of black Minnesotans ever published. Scott's original publications are held at the Hennepin County Library.

Minnesota's Black Community Project was formed to create a follow up volume to Scott's work called Minnesota's Black Community in the 21st Century, which was due to be published in May 2020.

== Publications ==
- The Centennial Edition of the Minneapolis Beacon (1956)
- Minneapolis Negro Profile: A Pictorial Resume of the Black Community, Its Achievements, and Its Immediate Goals (1968)
- Minnesota's Black Community (1976)
- The Scott Collection: Minnesota's Black Community in the '50s, '60s, and '70s (2018)
