= Math and Science Academy =

Math and Science Academy may refer to:

- Math and Science Academy (Woodbury, Minnesota)
- Chicago Math and Science Academy
- Hawthorne Math and Science Academy
- Illinois Mathematics and Science Academy
- Robert Lindblom Math & Science Academy

== See also ==
- California Academy of Mathematics and Science
- Massachusetts Academy of Math and Science at WPI
