= Walt Perlt =

American politician

Walter Ernest Pertl Jr.

Member of the Minnesota House of Representatives
- In office 1993–1996

Personal details
- Born: June 8, 1927 Saint Paul, Minnesota
- Died: September 23, 2002 (aged 75) Woodbury, Minnesota
- Party: Democratic
- Education: Hamline University
- Profession: Chief of Enforcement, Minnesota Department of Public Safety

Walter Ernest Pertl Jr. (June 8, 1927 – September 23, 2002) was an American politician.

Perlt was born in Saint Paul, Minnesota. He graduated from Hamline University with a degree in sociology and served in the United States military. Perlt was the chief of enforcement for the enforcement of liquor control of the Minnesota Department of Public Safety. Perlt lived with his wife and family in Woodbury, Minnesota. Perlt then served in the Minnesota House of Representatives from 1993 to 1996 and was a Democrat. Perlt died from a heart attack at his home in Woodbury, Minnesota. He was buried at the Fort Snelling National Cemetery.
