= Lake Elmo (Minnesota) =

Lake in the state of Minnesota, United States

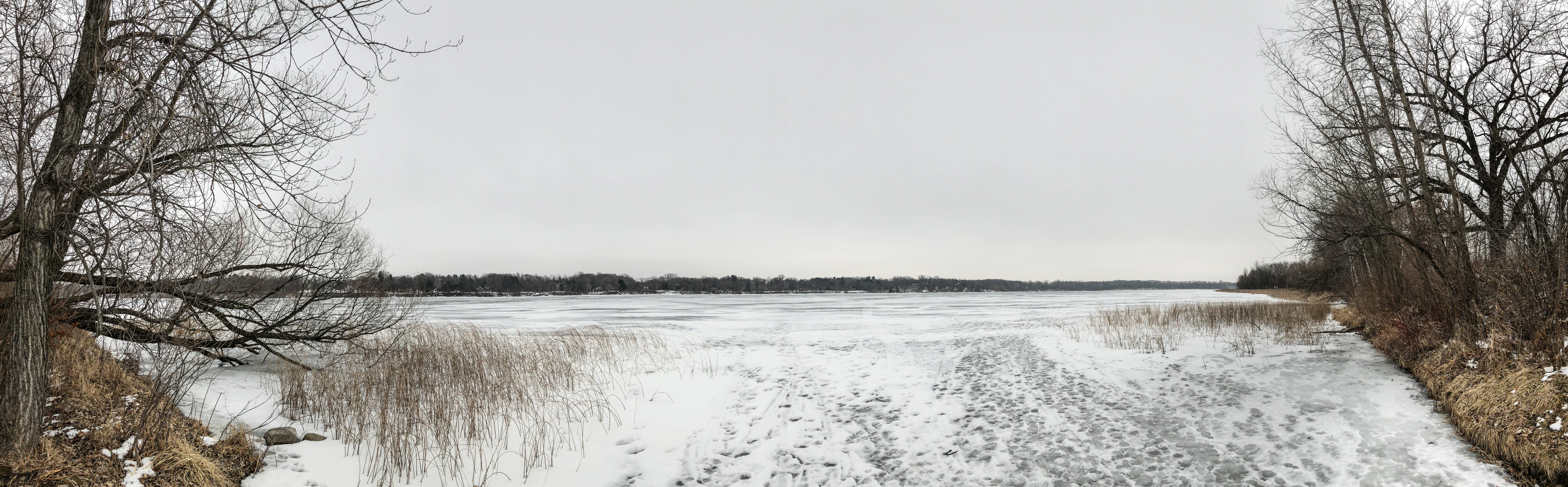
- Lake Elmo in winter

- Location within Minnesota
- Location: Washington County, Minnesota
- Coordinates: 44°59′03″N 92°53′02″W
- Type: Lake
- Basin countries: United States
- Surface area: 206 acres (83 ha)
- Max. depth: 140 ft (43 m)
- Surface elevation: 886 ft (270 m)
- Settlements: Lake Elmo

Lake Elmo is a lake in Washington County, Minnesota, in the United States, with a surface area of about 206 acres. It is partially within Lake Elmo Park Reserve, a regional park. The park also contains walking paths, camp grounds, playgrounds, and a swimming pond.

The lake was named after the 1866 novel St. Elmo by Augusta Jane Evans.

The nearby city Lake Elmo, Minnesota takes its name from the lake.

== See also ==
- List of lakes in Minnesota
