= Crystal Shamrock Airlines =

IATA	ICAO	Call sign
—	CYT	CRYSTAL
- Founded: 1959; 66 years ago
- Commenced operations: 1972; 53 years ago
- Ceased operations: 1991; 34 years ago
- Operating bases: Minneapolis Crystal Airport
- Fleet size: 3

Crystal Shamrock Airlines was a former charter airline based at the Minneapolis Crystal Airport. It was founded in 1966, and started operation on 5th August 1975. Operations ceased in 1991 and was dissolved on 4th October 1991. The airline was founded by the FBO Crystal Shamrock. The airline primarily operated charter flights using Douglas DC-3 aircraft. The primary summer use was Canadian fishing trips. In the winter, Crystal Shamrock used its DC-3s to transport college football and basketball teams, and many rock bands.

== History ==
On August 5, 1975, the airline started service with one round trip flight between Minneapolis, Fargo, and Bismarck North Dakota during the August 1975 Northwest Airlines strike.

The airline flew displaced passengers between Chicago and Omaha during a 1975 strike by United Airlines machinists. The route also had a stop in Des Moines, Iowa.

For one week in May 1978 the airline provided service from Minneapolis, Fargo, and Jamestown North Dakota. Shamrock discontinued service when North Central Airlines inaugurated service on a route from Bismarck, Fargo, North Dakota, Minneapolis and Chicago.

Marian Erickson was promoted from vice president to president in December 1978. She succeeded Lee Gilligan, who became Chairman of the Airline.

A charter flight from Minneapolis via Sioux Falls, South Dakota to Harlingen, Texas was offered to see the October 4, 1979 Commemorative Air Force air show.

In 1980 the airline transported Herb Brooks and the U.S. Olympic Hockey Team to Warroad, Minnesota, to play the local high school team.

In 1982 the airline offered chartered 3 and 6 day travel packages to Wollaston Lake Lodge in Saskatchewan Canada.

During a charter flight with passengers from Rochester, Minnesota, a Piper Apache collided with the front end of the company's DC-3 while on the ground in Springfield, Missouri.

== Fleet ==
- 2 × PC12
- 1 X C525
- 1 X TBM850
- 1 X P2006T
- 1 X C162
- 5 X C172
- 2 X RV12
- 1 X C182
- 1 X S22T
- 1 X SR20

== See also ==
- List of defunct airlines of the United States
