= Charles Chamblis =

American photographer

- Born: March 14, 1927; Pittsburgh, Pennsylvania, U.S.
- Died: February 3, 1991 (aged 63)
- Years active: 1960s–1980s
- Known for: Photography

Charles Chamblis (March 14, 1927 – February 3, 1991) was a Minnesota photographer known for his work capturing the social life in the Twin Cities African-American community.

Active during the 1970s and 1980s, Chamblis produced thousands of images of nightlife, family gatherings, landscapes, and portraits of Minneapolis residents. Featured in his photographs are depictions of the soul, funk, and R&B acts who pioneered the "Minneapolis sound.”

== Early life ==
Charles Chamblis was born in Pittsburgh, Pennsylvania in 1927. Chamblis lived without his mother for most of his childhood, spending his teenage years in a boy's home. From early on, Chamblis dreamed of becoming an artist and lied about his age to get placed into an art school.

Chamblis was honorably discharged from his service as a Marine during World War II and eventually relocated to Minnesota with his wife Jeanette in 1958. The couple had two daughters, Reva and Cynthia Chamblis and 1 son, Charles Chamblis jr. The couple divorced when Reva, the baby, was two years old.

At almost age thirty, Chamblis received his first camera, a one-step Polaroid, from Jeanette. He then began documenting "the best" of the Black Twin Cities.

== Photography ==
Chamblis captured everyday black life in the Twin Cities and was nicknamed "The Pictureman". During the 1970s, Chamblis started to make a career for himself as a photographer of black life in Minneapolis, occasionally landing more reliable freelance gigs, including Insight News and Minnesota's Black Community, a book by Walter R. Scott which recorded the local community and was published during the bicentennial.

Several of Chamblis’ photographs depict musicians during the early years of the development of the funk rock subgenre the "Minneapolis sound." Often attributed to being pioneered by Prince in the 1970s, Chamblis captured Prince and his contemporaries Maurice McKinnies and the Champions, Edgar Murphy, and the Valdons.

Community members who became subjects of his photographs described Chamblis as "friendly" and "talkative" and a regular attendee of social events. He was admired for capturing history and culture that was not documented in the mainstream.

== Death ==
Chamblis was diagnosed with a rare blood disorder in 1985 and died in 1991.

== Legacy ==
In 2001, Reva donated over 2,000 of her father's photographs to the Minnesota Historical Society. Displayed in 2014 at the Minnesota History Center, "Sights, Sounds, and Soul: Twin Cities Through the Lens of Charles Chamblis" was the first exhibit of Chamblis' work. The exhibit featured around 70 images and other loaned objects, including suits worn by Prince and Jellybean Johnson in the movie Purple Rain.

In 2017, Davu Seru co-wrote the companion book Sights, Sounds, Soul: Twin Cities Through the Lens of Charles Chamblis, providing context to Chamblis' work.
