= Crystal Airport (Minnesota) =

Coordinates: 45°03′43″N 093°21′14″W

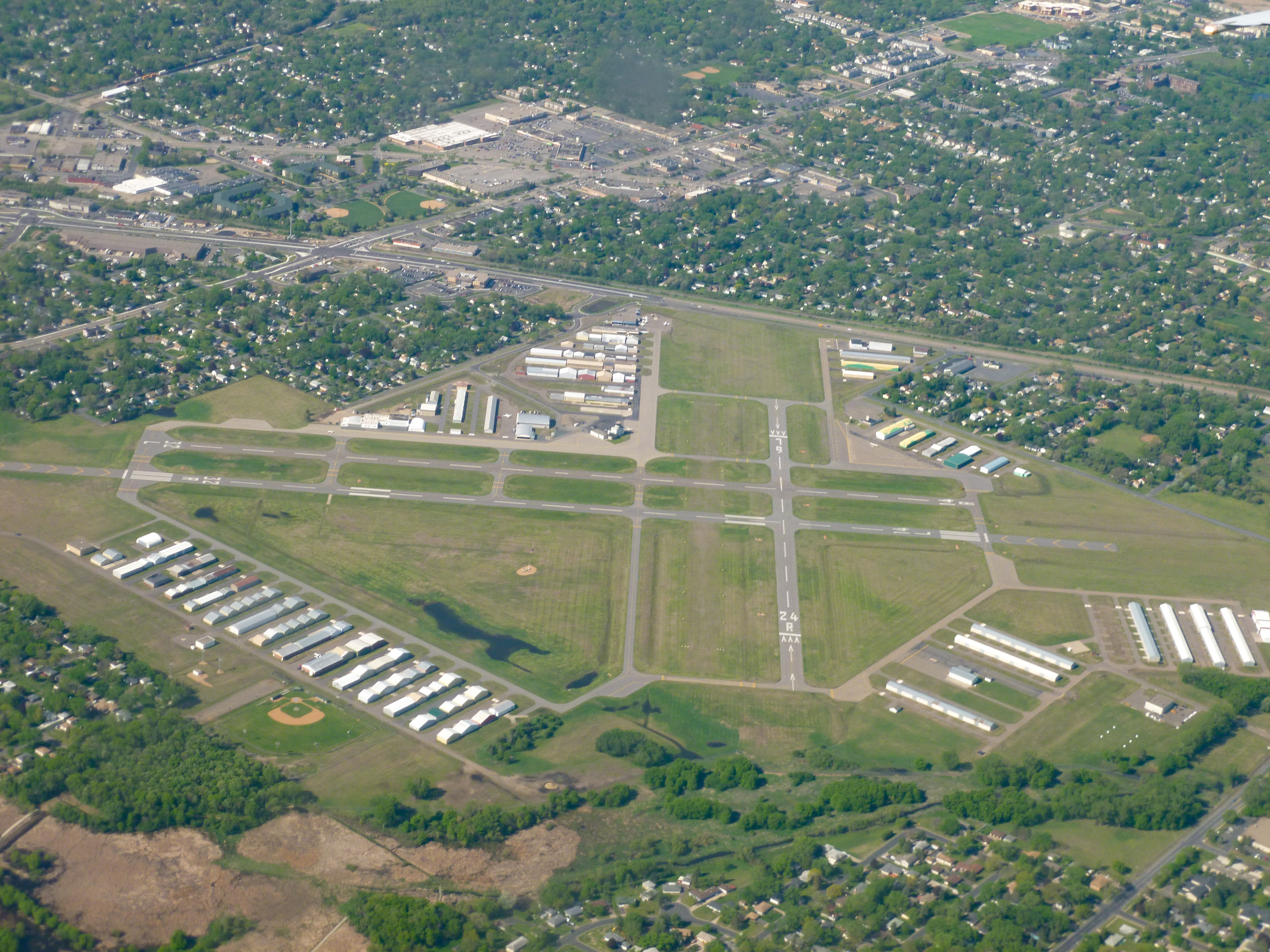
- IATA: MIC; ICAO: KMIC; FAA LID: MIC

Summary
- Airport type: Public
- Owner: Metropolitan Airports Commission
- Serves: Minneapolis–Saint Paul
- Location: Crystal, Minnesota
- Opened: 1948
- Elevation AMSL: 869 ft (265 m)

Map

Runways
Direction	Length		Surface
Direction	ft	m	Surface
14L/32R	3,268	995	Asphalt
14R/32L	3,267	995	Asphalt
6L/24R	2,500	762	Asphalt
6R/24L	2,123	647	Turf

Statistics
- Aircraft operations (2014): 42,351
- Based aircraft (2017): 177
- Source: Federal Aviation Administration

Crystal Airport (IATA: MIC, ICAO: KMIC, FAA LID: MIC) is a public airport named after the city of Crystal in Hennepin County, Minnesota, United States. Most of the airport is in the city of Crystal. Portions north of taxiway C (62nd Avenue) are in Brooklyn Park, and the north east corner of the airport is in Brooklyn Center. It is eight miles (13 km) northwest of the central business district of Minneapolis and is owned by the Metropolitan Airports Commission. The airport covers an area of approximately 430 acres.

It opened in 1946 as a privately owned, public use airport. In 1948 the Metropolitan Airports Commission purchased the airport. The Crystal Airport became the second airport acquired by MAC. Extensive construction actives began in 1950. Additional land purchases were made in 1951 and 1954. The additional 34 acres of land was purchased for runway expansion and noise relief.

== Facilities and aircraft ==
Crystal Airport covers an area of 436 acres (176 ha) which contains three runways:

- Runway 14/32: 3,751 ft × 75 ft (1,143 m × 23 m), surface: asphalt
- Runway 6L/24R: 2,500 ft × 75 ft (762 m × 23 m), surface: asphalt
- Runway 6R/24L: 1,669 ft × 137 ft (509 m × 42 m), surface: turf

Formerly, there was an identical asphalt 14/32 runway, resulting in an R/L configuration. However, that runway was converted into a taxiway.

For the 12-month period ending December 31, 2014, the airport had 42,351 aircraft operations, an average of 116 per day: 1% air taxi and 99% general aviation. In January 2017, there were 177 aircraft based at this airport: 159 single-engine, 11 multi-engine and 7 helicopter. The airport has a viewing area open from 8:00 AM – 8:00 PM from May 1 until the first snowfall. It is free to the public, has a picnic shelter, and offers unobstructed views of the airfield and air traffic control tower.

The airport has a full-service FBO offering flight training, charters, air-taxi, scenic flights, indoor and outdoor aircraft parking, rental cars, aviation fuel, pilot shop, and aircraft service. Wentworth Aircraft, an aircraft salvage businesses, is located at the Crystal Airport in the former Crystal Shamrock facilities. The oldest active business at Crystal is Maxwell Aircraft Service, also known as "The Prop Shop". It was founded by Ken Maxwell at the now closed Northport Airport in 1946, moved to the Crystal Airport in 1951. Several flying clubs are based at the airport including Club Cherokee, Gopher Flying Club, and Yankee Flying Club. Wiley Properties started in 1954 owns and rents approximately 100 hangars at the airport. There are approximately 250 total hangars at the airport.

== History ==
The Robbinsdale Airport located in Robbinsdale, MN hosted an airfield from the early 1920s. It was located near the intersection of West Broadway and 49th Avenue N. It closed before the Crystal Airport opened.

The current Crystal Airport is located one mile northeast of the original airfield. The airport site was acquired by the Metropolitan Airports Commission in 1948.

Hinck Flying Service, founded by Clarence Hinck, moved to the Crystal Airport from Minneapolis Wold–Chamberlain Field. The company was a Republic Seabee distributor and dealership. The company took initial delivery of 27 aircraft from August 1946 through June 1947.

The FBO Crystal Skyways was established in 1947. This was an Aero Commander dealership. The business was closed by 2004.

By 1950 Clark's Flying Service was located at the Crystal Airport. The business was known as Lysdale Flying Service before being purchased by Carlos A. Clark.

In 1952 the airport had a 2500-foot by 75-foot paved northwest–southeast runway, a parallel turf runway, and two crosswind northeast–southwest turf runways. In 1961 the primary runway was expanded to its current length and the crosswind runway was paved.

Bolduc Aviation Specialized Services was started after World War II by Wilmer Eugene Bolduc at the then-new Crystal Airport. The business was sold to Darrell Bolduc in 1978. The company moved to Anoka County–Blaine Airport in 1983.

Lakeland Skyways was founded by Niels Sorensen just after World War II at the Minneapolis/St. Paul International airport. The business moved to the Crystal Airport in 1952. The FBO was a Piper Aircraft dealership. Sorensen sold the business in 1977. Lakeland Skyways facility was sold in 1975 to Thunderbird Aviation.

By 1954, Ford Aviation was established at the Crystal Airport and was a Mooney Aircraft sales and service center. The business closed sometime after 1986.

In 1957 approximately 200 aircraft were based at the airport. 44 buildings had been built at this time. The Crystal Airport was the busiest secondary air field in the five state area.

Flying Scotchman started by Roy and Karol Arneson as a flying club and became a FBO in 1959. The FBO was a Cessna Pilot Center. It operated for 53 years before closing on February 1, 2011.

Crystal Shamrock was founded in 1959. The FBO was a Cessna pilot center and dealership. Starting in 1972 they began operating DC-3s for charter flights as Crystal Shamrock Airlines. In 1980 the airline transported Herb Brooks and the U.S. Olympic Hockey Team to Warroad, Minnesota, to play the local high school team. The company painted three of its hangars yellow with green clover leaves due to restrictions on billboard signs near the airport. The business filed for bankruptcy on April 29, 2007. An auction was held on Saturday, October 27, 2007, to sell off the remaining assets. Wentworth Aircraft acquired the former Crystal Shamrock buildings.

On May 23, 1972, winds measuring 73 miles per hour damaged several hangars. A Cessna 172 was destroyed when the hangar roof collapsed on it.

By 1975 Thunderbird Aviation had started operations at the Crystal Airport.

Helicopter Flight, Inc. was founded in 1989. The company acquired FAA certification for Part 135 Charter operations and was an FAA-approved Part 141 Flight School. The company was a dealership for Robinson Helicopter Company. The company was located on the west side of the airport in the former Pro Air maintenance hangar. By 2004 the company was no longer in business.

Operations at the Crystal Airport in 1992 numbered 179,456. About 325 aircraft were based at Crystal in 1992. In 1999 operations numbered 178,342.

In 2003, EAA Chapter 1330 was formed and held its meetings at the airport on the second Wednesday of the month. This chapter no longer exists.

On Sunday April 27, 2008, a fire destroyed a 13 unit hangar when a spark from a truck that backfired ignited the internal wood hangar structure. Two aircraft were completely destroyed and two others were damaged. Several aircraft normally stored in this hangar were not in it at the time of the fire. This hangar was not rebuilt.

On June 27, 2013, high winds with peak gusts of 69 miles per hour partially destroyed one of the iconic Crystal Shamrock hangars on the west side of the airport. This hangar was eventually demolished.

In the US Federal Government fiscal year 2013, an FAA Airport Improvement Program grant of $299,942 was award to install airfield guidance signs and to rehabilitate a taxiway. In 2014 an FAA AIP grant of $477,712 was awarded for taxiway rehabilitation. On July 29, 2019, an FAA AIP grant of $308,853 was announced to reconstruct taxiways B, and C. On April 30, 2020, an FAA Airport Improvement Program Grant of $4,111,111 was awarded to rehabilitate taxiways at the airport.

In 2020 the airport received a $69,000 CARES Act award.

Other former fixed-base operators (FBO) located at the Crystal Airport include Condor Aviation, Northland Aircraft Services, and Pro Air. In 1957, other businesses based at the airport included Fli-Lite Corporation, which made aircraft skis; and Twin Cities Parachute Company.

== Transit ==
Crystal Airport is served by MetroTransit Routes 721, 716, and 767.

If the METRO Blue Line light rail extension is built, it will have a stop near the Crystal Airport linking downtown Minneapolis, Target Field, U.S. Bank Stadium, the Minneapolis-St. Paul International Airport, and the Mall of America to the Crystal Airport with a single seat light rail trip.

== Events ==
Crystal Airport hosts an open house every year on Father's Day weekend. Events include a free hangar dance with a live band, fireworks, food concessions, airplane rides, helicopter rides, pancake breakfast, craft / vendor fair, and displays including law enforcement, ambulance, and public works.

The first CrySTOL demonstration event was held on September 14, 2019. STOL stands for Short Take Off and Landing.

== Gallery ==
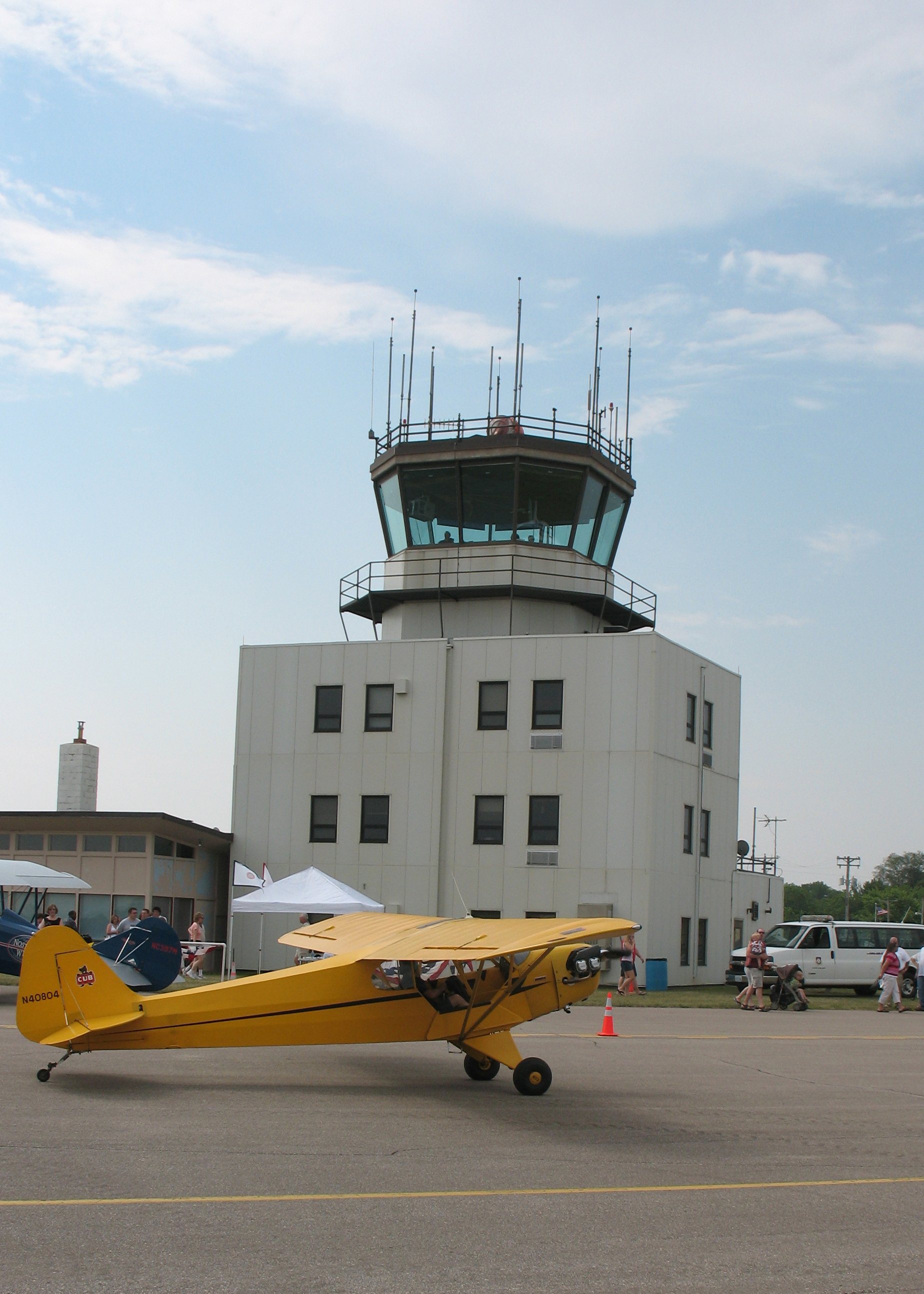
A Piper J3C-65 Cub taxis by the control tower during the 2007 Crystal Airport Open House and Fly-In

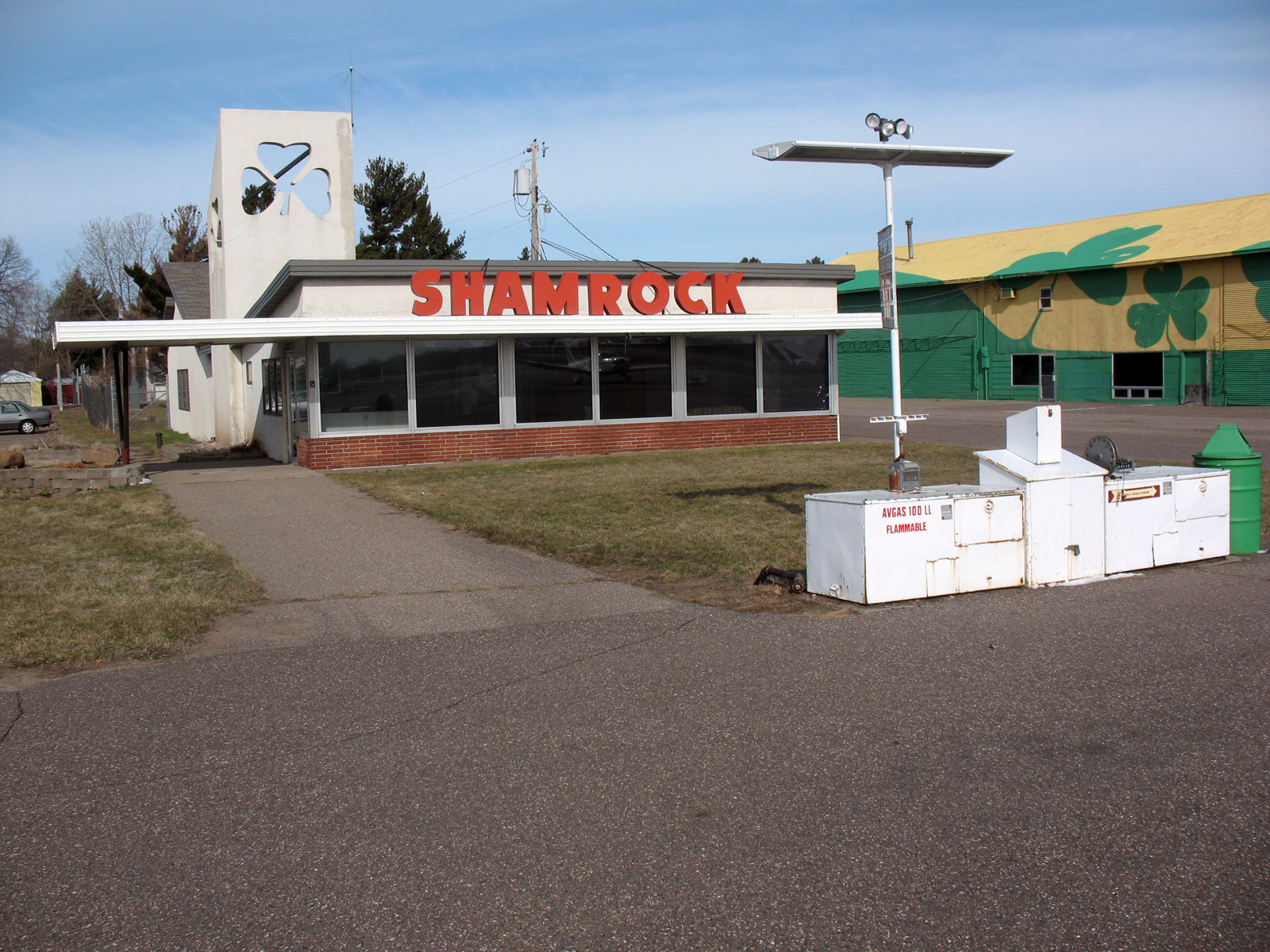
Crystal Shamrock, Inc, a former FBO

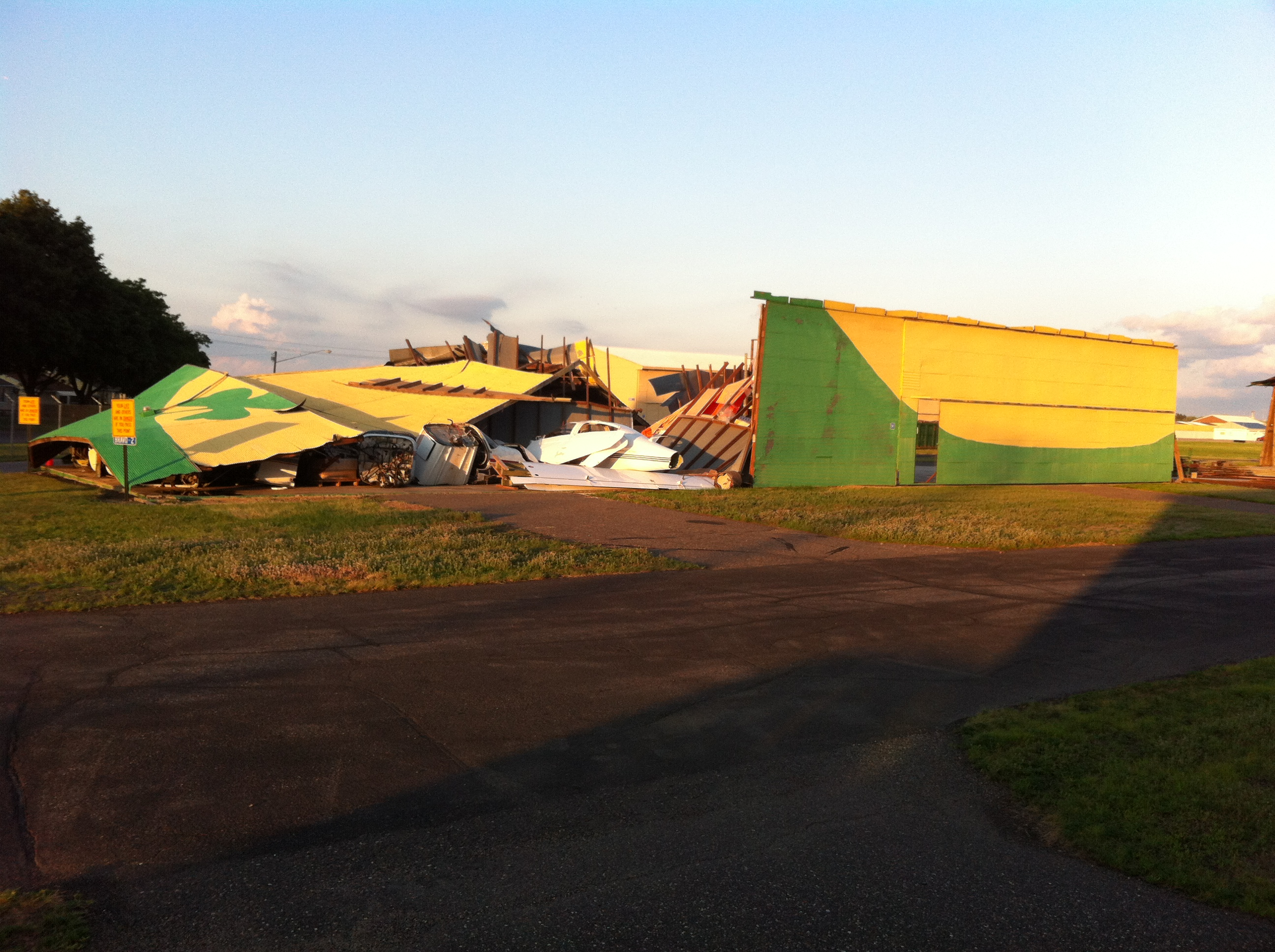
Storm damaged hangar at the Crystal Airport

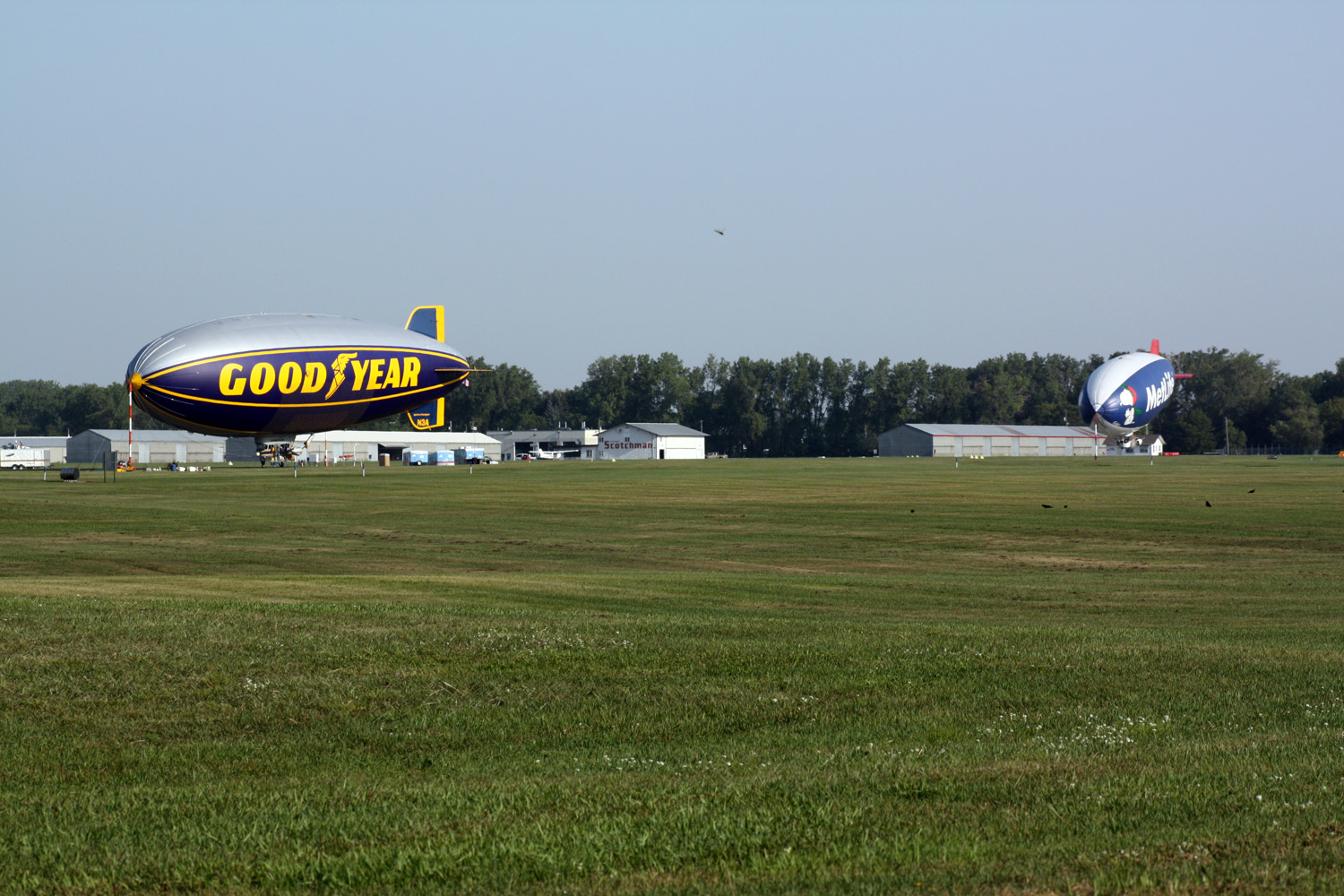
Blimps moored at the Minneapolis Crystal Airport

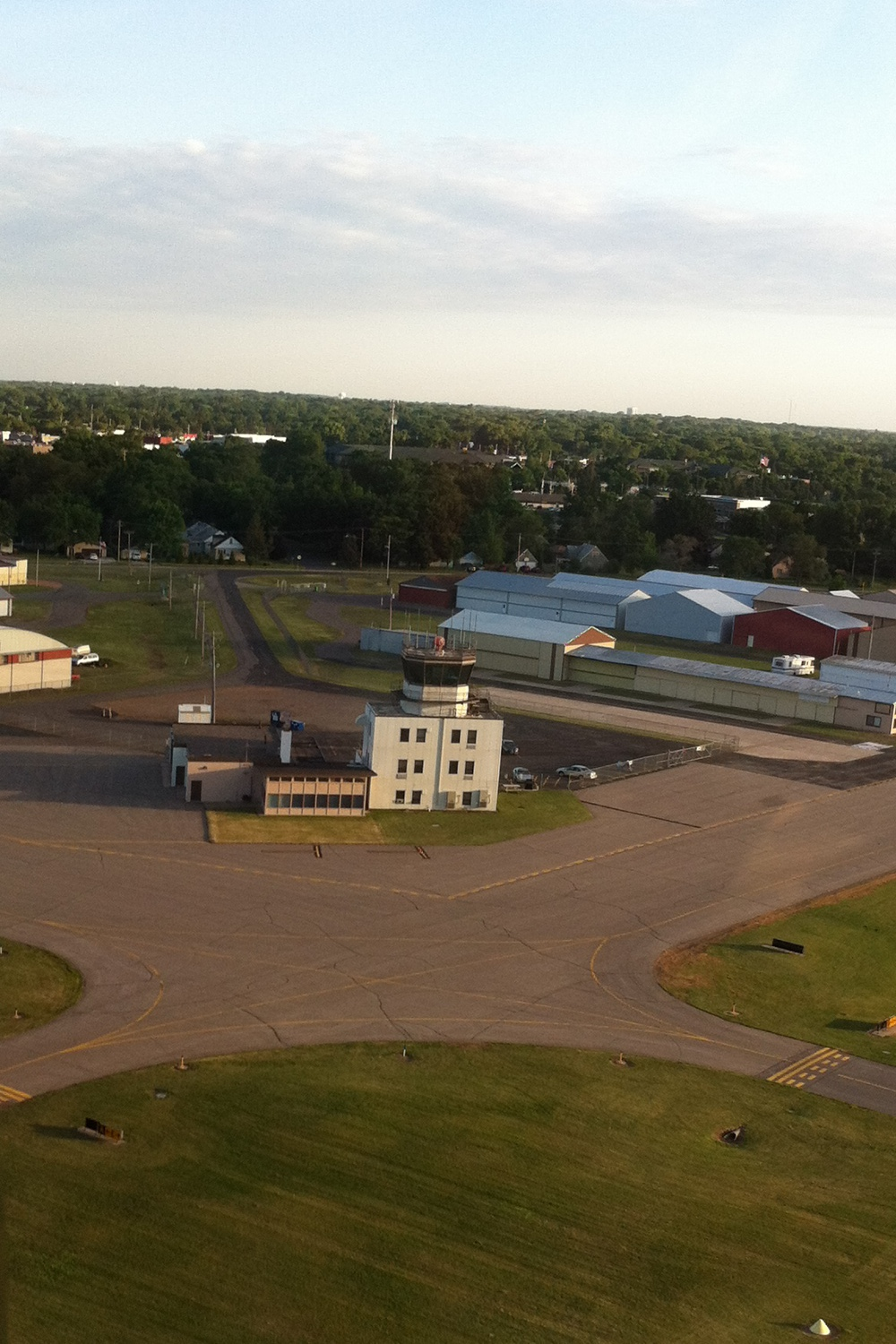
An aerial view of the Minneapolis Crystal Airport Control Tower

== See also ==
- List of airports in Minnesota
