= Woodbury, Minnesota =

City in Minnesota, United States

- City
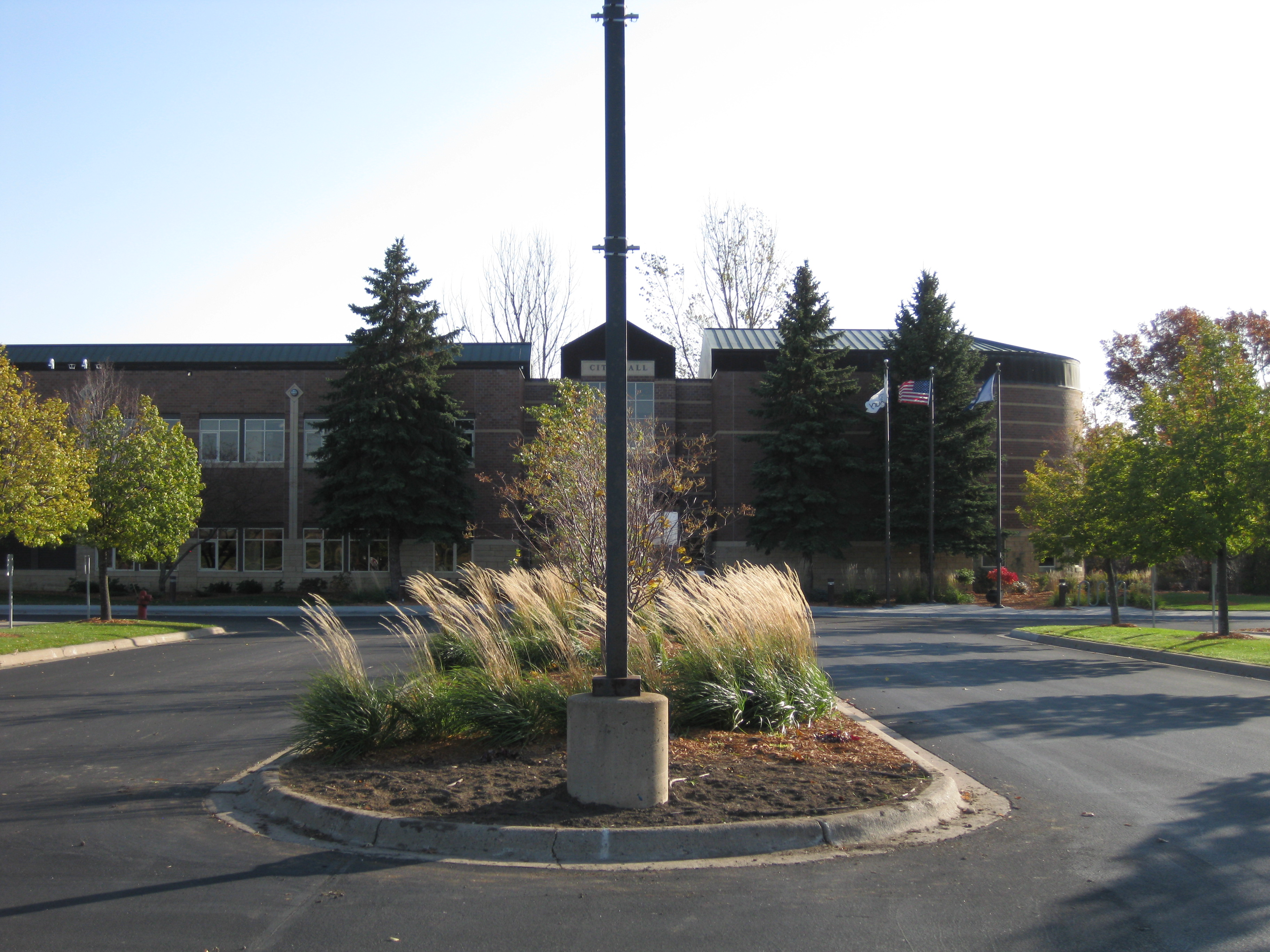
- Woodbury City Hall in October 2008

- Flag Logo
- Interactive location map of Woodbury
- Coordinates: 44.906283°N 92.923703°W
- Country: United States
- State: Minnesota
- County: Washington
- Founded: 1858
- Incorporated: March 7, 1967

Government
  - Type: Mayor–council government
  - Mayor: Anne Burt

Area
  - City: 35.722 sq mi (92.520 km^{2})
  - Land: 34.895 sq mi (90.377 km^{2})
  - Water: 0.827 sq mi (2.142 km^{2}) 2.32%
- Elevation: 978 ft (298 m)

Population (2020)
  - City: 75,102
  - Estimate (2024): 80,596
  - Rank: US: 460th MN: 7th
  - Density: 2,310/sq mi (891.8/km^{2})
  - Metro: 3,757,952 (US: 16th)
- Time zone: UTC–6 (Central (CST))
  - Summer (DST): UTC–5 (CDT)
- ZIP Codes: 55125, 55129
- Area code: 651
- FIPS code: 27-71428
- GNIS feature ID: 2397369
- Website: www.woodburymn.gov

Woodbury (/ˈwʊdbɛri/ WUUD-berr-ee) is a city in Washington County, Minnesota, United States, eight miles (13 km) east of Saint Paul along Interstate 94. It is part of the Minneapolis–Saint Paul metropolitan area. The population was 75,102 at the 2020 census, and was estimated at 81,558 in 2025, making it Minnesota's seventh-most populous city.

== History ==
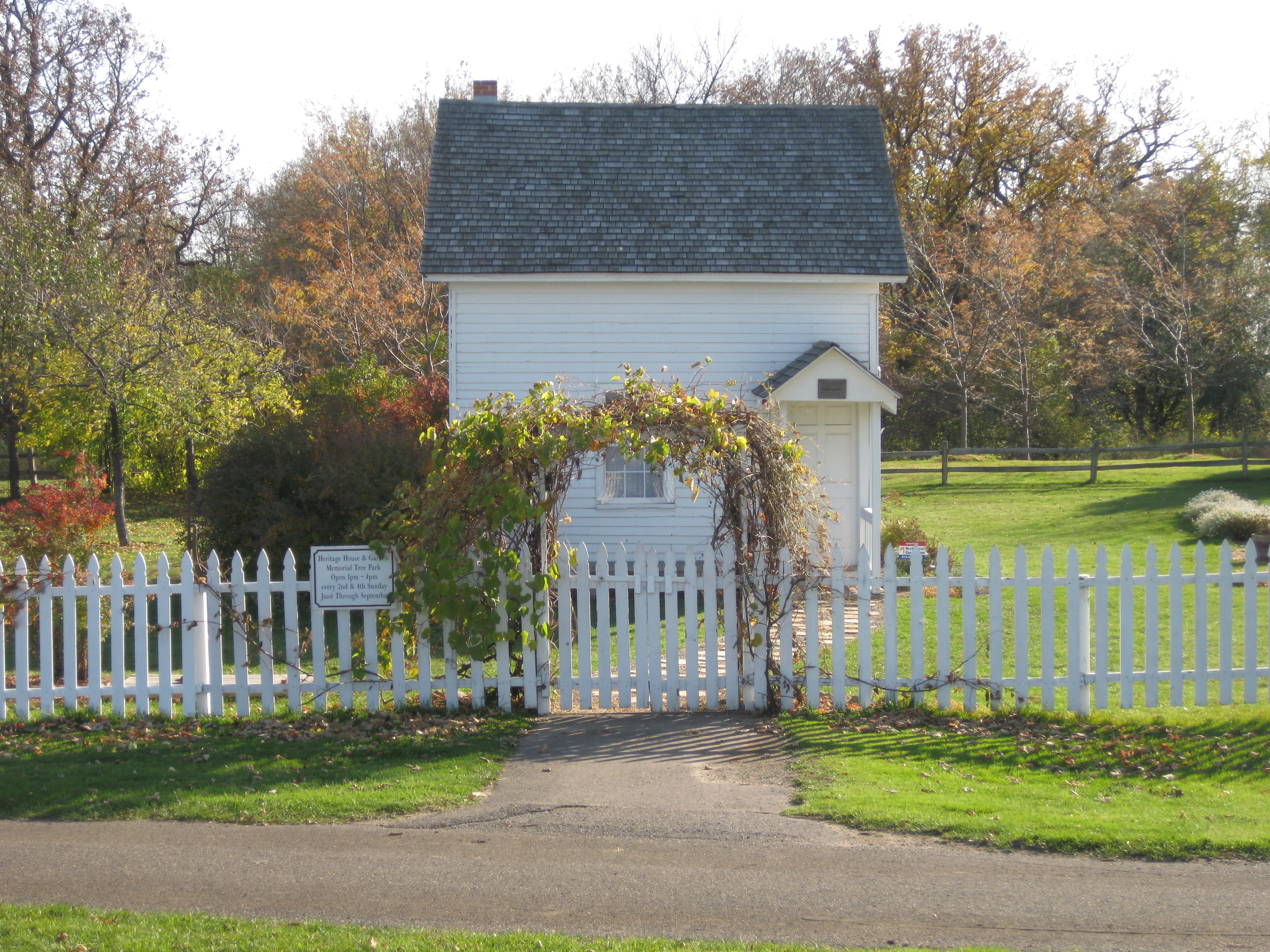
The historic Heritage House

At almost 36 square miles, Woodbury is a direct descendant of one of the congressional townships into which Minnesota Territory when the Native Americans of the United States ceded the territory and opened it to "settlement". Woodbury was originally named Red Rock, but was renamed after Levi Woodbury, the first justice of the Supreme Court of the United States to attend law school, after it was realized that another Red Rock Township existed in Minnesota. When first settled in 1844, the land was mostly wood, but it was converted to farmland. The township government was organized in 1858. One of the city's few surviving 19th-century farms, the Charles Spangenberg Farmstead, is on the National Register of Historic Places.

In 1955, the first suburban development broke ground in Woodbury: Woodbury Heights. After some years of growth, the town government could not adequately provide services for new developments, and it became clear that Woodbury needed the government of a village with extra privileges. The earliest proposal for incorporation officially came in 1963 after two years of debate.

The Minnesota Municipal Commission had recently found that the fragmented way in which the Minneapolis suburbs and the suburbs around White Bear Lake had developed was disadvantageous, as it made coordinating sewers, public water systems, and other utilities difficult. Thus, the commission had been encouraging towns to incorporate in full whenever possible.

Since 1961, the Town of Cottage Grove had been petitioning to become a village, and the Minnesota Municipal Commission took it upon itself to push for a joint incorporation of Woodbury and Cottage Grove as the Village of Washington. The two town commissions agreed to the idea, and the issue was put up for a vote during the general election of 1963. It lost with 662 votes for joint incorporation, and 1,284 against. Cottage Grove incorporated on its own in 1965.

In 1966, a series of meetings took place setting up the incorporation of the Village of Woodbury. A vote was conducted on February 14, 1967, with 543 voting for incorporation, and 164 against. The Village was officially incorporated on March 7, 1967.

== Geography ==
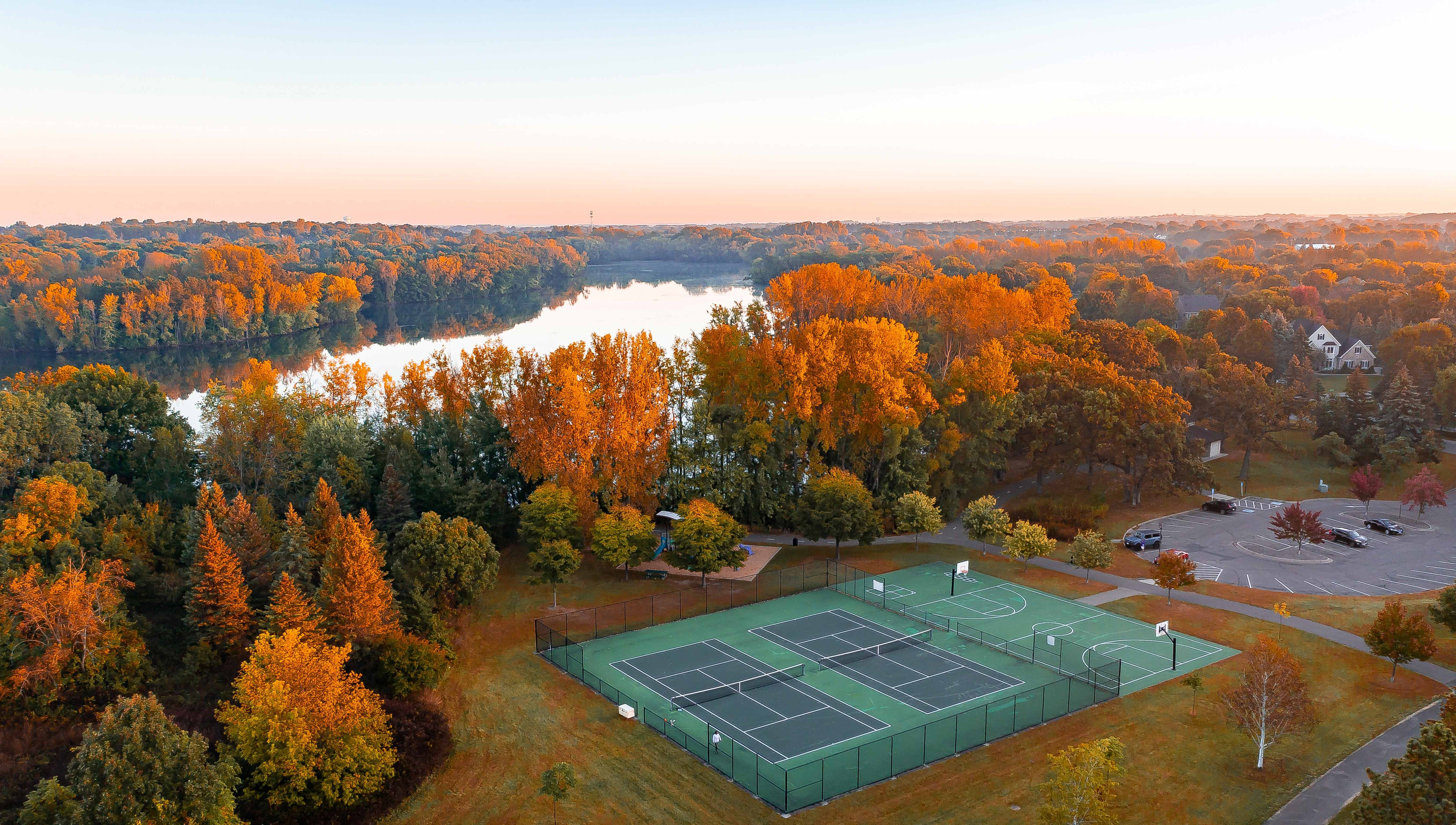
Aerial view of Edgewater Park and Colby Lake in Woodbury, MN

According to the United States Census Bureau, the city has an area of 35.722 square miles (92.52 km^{2}), of which 34.895 square miles (90.38 km^{2}) is land and 0.827 square miles (2.14 km^{2}) (2.32%) is water.

The city is bounded on the northern side by Interstate 94, the south by the plane of 60th Street South, the west by Century Avenue, and the east by Manning Avenue. The adjoining cities in these directions are, respectively, Oakdale, Landfall, Lake Elmo, Cottage Grove, Maplewood, Newport and Afton.

Woodbury is composed of upland between the valleys of the Mississippi River and St. Croix River. Its northeast corner lies within the watershed of Valley Creek, one of the few remaining trout streams in the Twin Cities area. Valley Creek flows eastward to the St. Croix River at Afton. Woodbury also contains several small lakes, including Powers, Wilmes, Colby, Carver, and Battle Creek. Battle Creek Lake is the source of Battle Creek, which flows westward to the Mississippi River in Saint Paul.

=== Climate ===
Climate data for Woodbury, Minnesota
Month	Jan	Feb	Mar	Apr	May	Jun	Jul	Aug	Sep	Oct	Nov	Dec	Year
Mean daily maximum °F (°C)	23 (−5)	30 (−1)	42 (6)	58 (14)	71 (22)	79 (26)	83 (28)	81 (27)	72 (22)	59 (15)	41 (5)	27 (−3)	55.5 (13.1)
Mean daily minimum °F (°C)	6 (−14)	13 (−11)	24 (−4)	36 (2)	48 (9)	58 (14)	63 (17)	61 (16)	52 (11)	40 (4)	26 (−3)	12 (−11)	36.6 (2.6)
Average precipitation inches (mm)	1.02 (26)	0.78 (20)	1.92 (49)	2.54 (65)	3.73 (95)	4.98 (126)	4.41 (112)	4.37 (111)	3.20 (81)	2.51 (64)	2.09 (53)	1.04 (26)	32.59 (828)

== Demographics ==
Historical population
Census	Pop.	Note	%±
1860	350		—
1870	990		182.9%
1880	1,169		18.1%
1890	1,166		−0.3%
1900	1,200		2.9%
1910	1,039		−13.4%
1920	956		−8.0%
1930	931		−2.6%
1940	955		2.6%
1950	1,056		10.6%
1960	3,014		185.4%
1970	6,184		105.2%
1980	10,297		66.5%
1990	20,075		95.0%
2000	46,463		131.4%
2010	61,961		33.4%
2020	75,102		21.2%
2025 (est.)	81,558		8.6%
U.S. Decennial Census; 2020 Census

=== Racial and ethnic composition ===
Woodbury, Minnesota – racial and ethnic composition Note: the US Census treats Hispanic/Latino as an ethnic category. This table excludes Latinos from the racial categories and assigns them to a separate category. Hispanics/Latinos may be of any race.
Race / ethnicity (NH = non-Hispanic)
Race / ethnicity (NH = non-Hispanic)	Population 1990		Population 2000		Population 2010		Population 2020	
Race / ethnicity (NH = non-Hispanic)	Number	Percent	Number	Percent	Number	Percent	Number	Percent
White alone (NH)	18,743	93.36%	41,238	88.75%	49,016	79.11%	53,461	71.18%
Black or African American alone (NH)	302	1.50%	1,152	2.48%	3,392	5.47%	5,500	7.32%
Native American or Alaska Native alone (NH)	60	0.30%	110	0.24%	147	0.24%	179	0.24%
Asian alone (NH)	617	3.07%	2,317	4.99%	5,645	9.11%	8,556	11.39%
Pacific Islander alone (NH)	—	—	6	0.01%	15	0.02%	19	0.03%
Other race alone (NH)	7	0.03%	52	0.11%	68	0.11%	258	0.34%
Mixed race or multiracial (NH)	—	—	592	1.27%	1,349	2.18%	3,526	4.69%
Hispanic or Latino (any race)	346	1.72%	996	2.14%	2,329	3.76%	3,603	4.80%
Total	20,075	100.00%	46,463	100.00%	61,961	100.00%	75,102	100.00%

=== 2020 census ===
As of the 2020 census, there were 75,102 people, 27,290 households, and 19,947 families residing in the city.

The median age was 38.3 years. 26.9% of residents were under the age of 18 and 13.7% were 65 years of age or older. For every 100 females there were 92.5 males, and for every 100 females age 18 and over there were 88.5 males age 18 and over.

Of these households, 38.2% had children under the age of 18 living in them. Of all households, 59.9% were married-couple households, 11.5% were households with a male householder and no spouse or partner present, and 22.9% were households with a female householder and no spouse or partner present. About 21.8% of all households were made up of individuals and 9.4% had someone living alone who was 65 years of age or older.

There were 28,304 housing units, of which 3.6% were vacant. The homeowner vacancy rate was 0.9% and the rental vacancy rate was 6.0%.

99.8% of residents lived in urban areas, while 0.2% lived in rural areas.

Racial composition as of the 2020 census
Race	Number	Percent
White	54,319	72.3%
Black or African American	5,578	7.4%
American Indian and Alaska Native	246	0.3%
Asian	8,576	11.4%
Native Hawaiian and Other Pacific Islander	19	0.0%
Some other race	1,072	1.4%
Two or more races	5,292	7.0%
Hispanic or Latino (of any race)	3,603	4.8%

=== 2010 census ===
As of the 2010 census, there were 61,961 people, 22,594 households, and 16,688 families living in the city. The population density was 1,784.1 inhabitants per square mile (688.8/km^{2}). There were 23,568 housing units at an average density of 678.6 per square mile (262.0/km^{2}). The racial makeup of the city was 81.4% White, 5.6% African American, 0.3% Native American, 9.1% Asian, 1.0% from other races, and 2.5% from two or more races. Hispanic or Latino of any race were 3.8% of the population.

There were 22,594 households, of which 42.3% had children under the age of 18 living with them, 61.8% were married couples living together, 8.7% had a female householder with no husband present, 3.3% had a male householder with no wife present, and 26.1% were non-families. 20.4% of all households were made up of individuals, and 5.7% had someone living alone who was 65 years of age or older. The average household size was 2.73 and the average family size was 3.20.

The median age in the city was 35.6 years. 29.6% of residents were under the age of 18; 6.2% were between the ages of 18 and 24; 29.6% were from 25 to 44; 26.3% were from 45 to 64; and 8.3% were 65 years of age or older. The gender makeup of the city was 48.2% male and 51.8% female.

=== 2000 census ===
As of the 2000 census, there were 46,463 people, 16,676 households, and 12,657 families living in the city. The population density was 1,327.7 inhabitants per square mile (512.6/km^{2}). There were 17,541 housing units at an average density of 501.2 per square mile (193.5/km^{2}). The racial makeup of the city was 90.04% White, 2.51% African American, 0.24% Native American, 5.01% Asian, 0.01% Pacific Islander, 0.62% from other races, and 1.56% from two or more races. Hispanic or Latino of any race were 2.14% of the population.

There were 16,676 households, out of which 43.8% had children under the age of 18 living with them, 66.8% were married couples living together, 6.9% had a female householder with no husband present, and 24.1% were non-families. 18.8% of all households were made up of individuals, and 3.3% had someone living alone who was 65 years of age or older. The average household size was 2.76 and the average family size was 3.20.

In the city, the population was spread out, with 30.6% under the age of 18, 5.9% from 18 to 24, 36.9% from 25 to 44, 20.5% from 45 to 64, and 6.1% who were 65 years of age or older. The median age was 33 years. For every 100 females, there were 94.1 males. For every 100 females age 18 and over, there were 91.4 males.

The median income for a household in the city was $76,109, and the median income for a family was $84,997. Males had a median income of $60,224 versus $37,676 for females. The per capita income for the city was $32,606. About 0.8% of families and 1.7% of the population were below the poverty line, including 1.2% of those under age 18 and 1.2% of those age 65 or over.

=== Recent estimates ===
According to realtor website Zillow, the average price of a home in Woodbury as of October 31, 2025, is $451,932.

As of the 2024 American Community Survey, there are 31,236 estimated households in Woodbury, with an average of 2.57 persons per household. The city has a median household income of $111,734. About 5.0% of the city's population lives at or below the poverty line. Woodbury has an estimated 66.5% employment rate, with 54.5% of the population holding a bachelor's degree or higher and 94.4% holding a high school diploma. The survey estimated 32,796 housing units at an average density of 0.0 per square mile (0.0/km^{2}).

== Economy ==
State Farm Insurance was a large-scale employer in the city, employing about 2,000 people in a building that opened in 1994. In 2006 the multi-department facility was relocated to Lincoln, Nebraska, and the building remained vacant until it was demolished in 2015 for redevelopment. There are many smaller employers, such as the Joint Commission on Allied Health Personnel in Ophthalmology and offices for financial corporations. Many Woodbury residents work at 3M, whose headquarters are a few miles west, in Maplewood.

A large part of the economy is retail. The two largest retail centers are Tamarack Village, near the intersection of Radio Drive and Interstate 94, and Woodbury Village, near the intersection of Valley Creek Road and Interstate 494. Woodbury Lakes, an upscale retail development with an open-air mall layout, was completed in 2005.

=== Largest employers ===
According to the city's 2022 Comprehensive Annual Financial Report:

Rank	Employer	# of Employees
1	M Health Fairview (HealthEast)	1,013
2	South Washington County School District ISD 833	964
3	Target Corporation	864
4	3M	759
5	Self Esteem Brands	472
6	Summit Orthopedics	397
7	HealthPartners (includes TRIA)	393
8	Long Term Care Group, Inc.	317
9	City of Woodbury	250
10	Saint Therese	199
Total		5,628

Other important employers include eFunds, Long Term Care Group and Dean Foods/Land O'Lakes.

== Arts and culture ==
There are many local events year-round. On the last weekend of August, the Woodbury Days Council hosts a festival in Ojibway Park called Woodbury Days. It includes a parade, carnival, live music, fireworks, and booths for the city's shops, organizations, and services. City ambassadors for the event are called "royalty". Woodbury Days is also known for its "Taste of Woodbury" tent, with food from many local restaurants.

== Parks and recreation ==
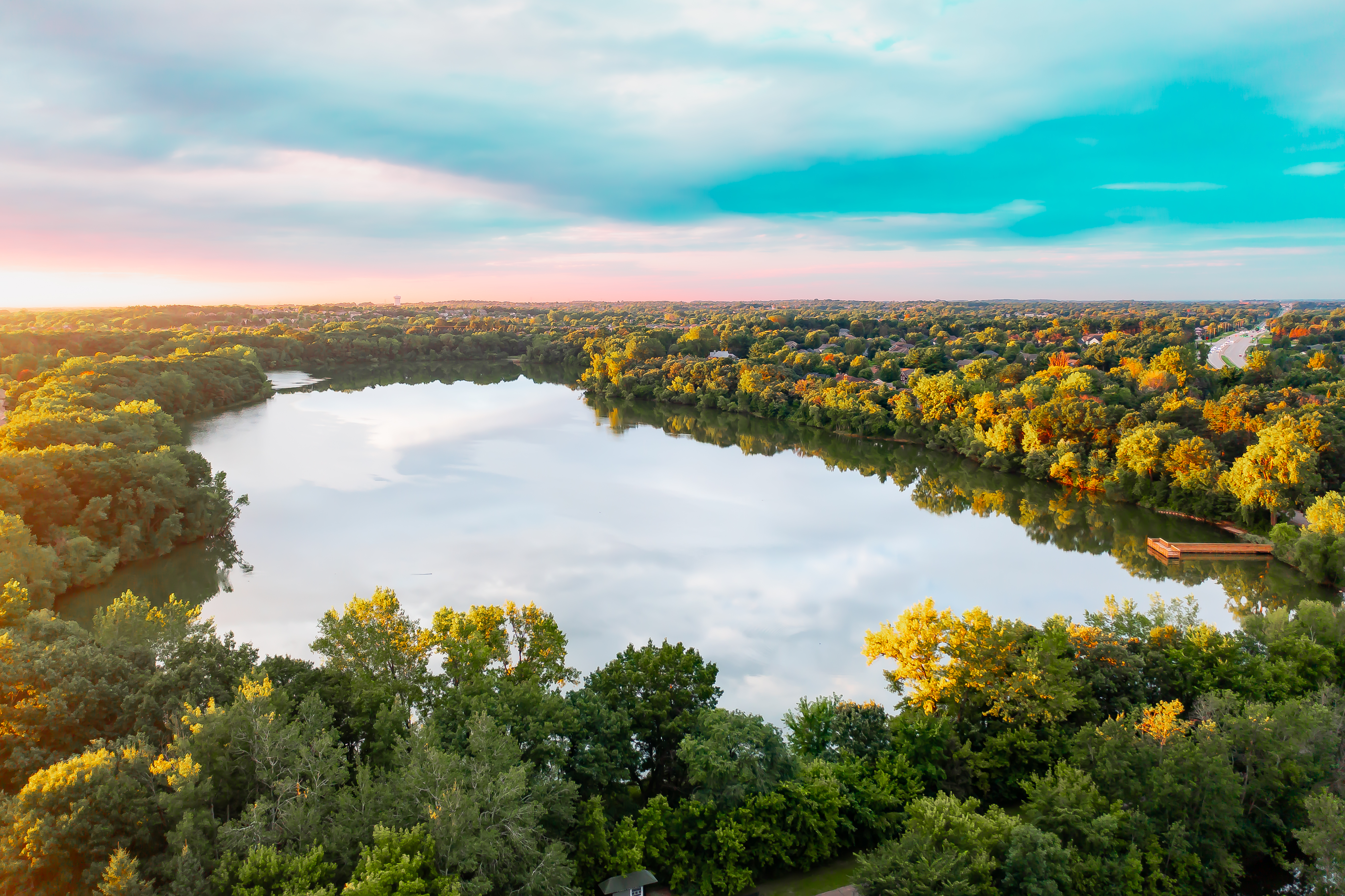
Aerial view of Powers Lake in Woodbury, MN

Woodbury has 63 parks, covering about 3,600 acres (15 km^{2}), and about 180 miles (290 km) of trails.The trails, most of which are paved, connect many of the parks. The parks contain features such as playgrounds, splash pads, a skatepark, a sand volleyball court, and a disc golf course. Three of the largest parks encircle Colby, Wilmes, and Powers lakes. The indoor Central Park is adjacent to the public library. M Health Fairview Sports Center is the primary athletic location, including softball fields, baseball fields, soccer fields, football fields, two indoor ice arenas, and an outdoor ice arena.

Two golf courses are in the city: Prestwick (privately owned) and Eagle Valley (public).

== Government ==
Woodbury has a weak-mayor, mayor-council government. In presidential election years, Woodbury elects two city council members at large. In midterm election years, it elects a mayor and two city council members at large. As the city's population has grown, Woodbury has shifted toward the Democratic and Democratic-Farmer-Labor parties, with the city not voting for a Republican in a presidential election since 2004.

The city council is currently composed of Mayor Anne Burt, Steve Morris, Jennifer Santini, Kim Wilson, and Donna Stafford.

Presidential election results

Presidential elections results
Year	Republican	Democratic	Third parties
2024	38.2% 17,695	59.2% 27,471	2.6% 1,211
2020	38.5% 17,670	59.4% 27,263	2.1% 964
2016	39.9% 15,286	51.7% 19,819	8.4% 3,200
2012	48.5% 17,785	49.8% 18,252	1.7% 618
2008	46.3% 15,856	52.5% 17,968	1.1% 391
2004	54.6% 20,204	44.6% 16,486	0.8% 310
2000	52.1% 13,539	43.6% 11,319	4.3% 1,117
1996	40.6% 7,156	48.6% 8,577	10.8% 1,905
1992	36.6% 5,088	39.7% 5,510	23.7% 3,293
1988	51.1% 4,836	47.2% 4,466	1.6% 153
1984	56.2% 3,893	42.1% 2,917	1.7% 118
1980	45.7% 2,493	40.2% 2,196	14.1% 771
1976	51.7% 2,160	45.3% 1,895	3.0% 124
1972	Unknown	Unknown	Unknown
1968	43.1% 875	53.2% 1,080	3.6% 74
1964	31.6% 398	68.3% 860	0.1% 1
1960	48.6% 587	51.0% 617	0.4% 5
1956	57.2% 267	42.4% 198	0.4% 2

List of mayors

Years in office	Name
1967-1982	Orville Bielenberg
1982-1990	Dan Guider
1990-1993	Kenneth Mahle
1993-2010	Bill Hargis
2010-2018	Mary Giuliani Stephens
2018–present	Anne Burt

== Education ==
Most of Woodbury is in the South Washington County School District, and most high school students attend either Woodbury High School or East Ridge High School. Small portions of the city attend Tartan Senior High School in Oakdale and Stillwater Area High School in Stillwater. Some students attend public or private schools in other school districts chosen by their families under Minnesota's open enrollment statute.

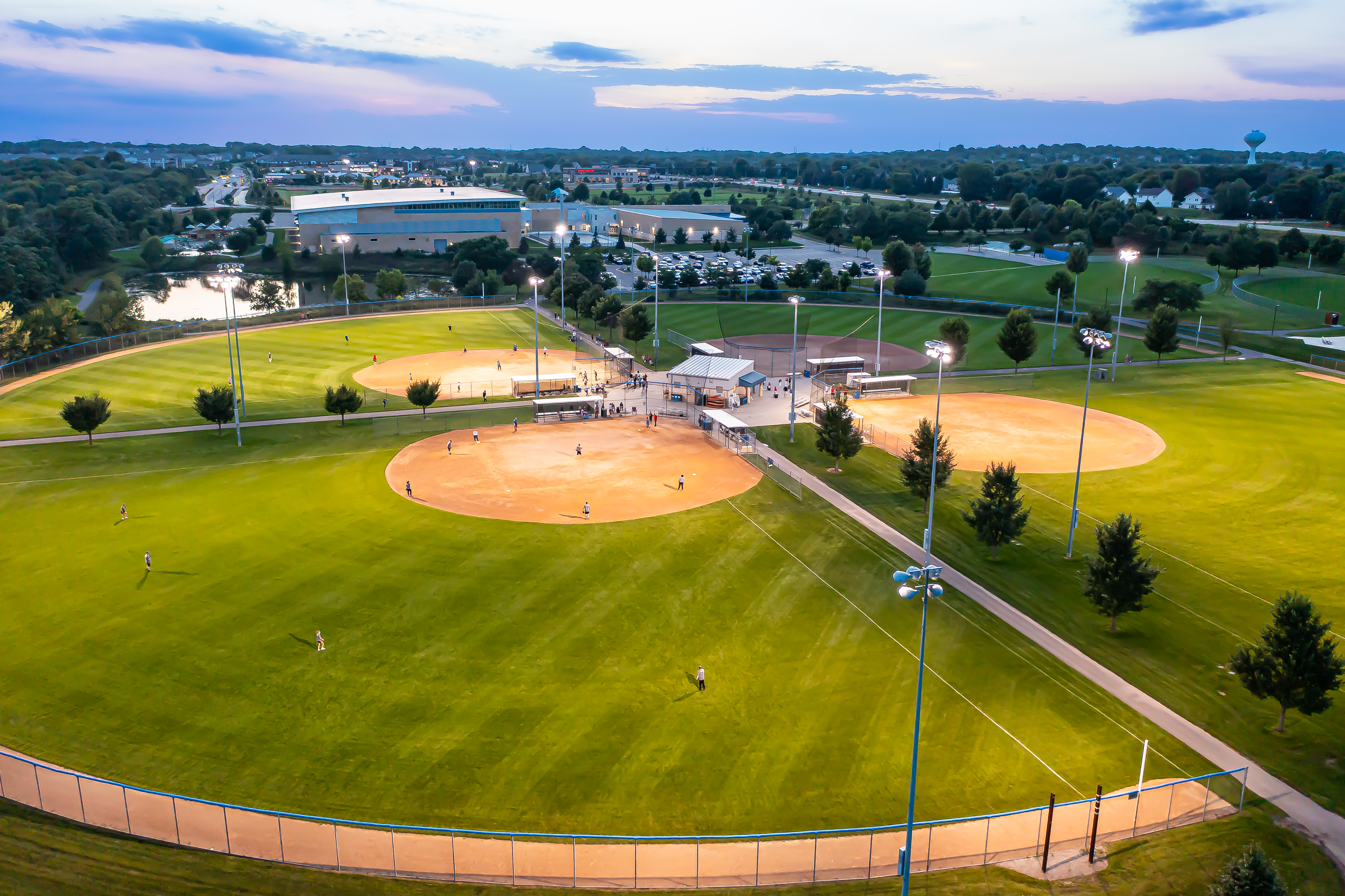
Aerial view of M Health Fairview Sports Center complex in Woodbury, MN

In November 2006, School District 833 selected an 80-acre (320,000 m^{2}) site for its third high school, later named East Ridge High School. The site lies between two city-owned properties south of Bailey Road and east of Radio Drive: the 80-acre (320,000 m^{2}) M Health Fairview Sports Center and the Danner gravel pit. The city also owns 80 acres (320,000 m^{2}) south of the sports center to allow for expansion. The school opened in September 2009. Its students came from Woodbury, Cottage Grove, Newport, Afton, and Denmark.

There are two middle schools in Woodbury, Lake Middle School and Woodbury Middle School. Some middle-school students also attend Oltman Middle School in Cottage Grove, Skyview Middle School in Oakdale, Maplewood Middle School in Maplewood, and Oak-Land Middle School in Lake Elmo. Woodbury is also served by 12 elementary schools in three school districts.

Woodbury is also home to the Minnesota Math and Science Academy, a charter school. Saint Ambrose of Woodbury is a Catholic school with Pre-K through 8th grade; New Life Academy is a private Christian school. Both are within the city limits.

Rasmussen College–Lake Elmo / Woodbury campus serves students in the Woodbury area. Rasmussen College is a regionally accredited, career focused college that offers bachelor and associate degree programs. It concentrates on programs in health sciences, nursing, business, technology and design, criminal justice, and early education.

== Notable people ==
- Kelly Fenton, former Minnesota State Representative and former Minnesota Republican Party deputy chairperson
- Michelle Fischbach, United States Representative from Minnesota's Seventh Congressional District
- Brent Kallman, professional soccer player
- Devin Padelford, professional soccer player
- Susan Kent, Minnesota State Senate minority leader
- Jason Lewis, former United States Representative From Minnesota's Second Congressional District
- Nicole Mitchell, meteorologist and politician
- Walt Perlt, Minnesota state representative
- Mary Giuliani Stephens, former mayor
- Michelle Young, star of season 18 of The Bachelorette
