= Metropolitan Airports Commission =

Airport authority in the Twin Cities region

Metropolitan Airports Commission (MAC)
- Iŋópaȟpíŋ Mníȟaŋkíya
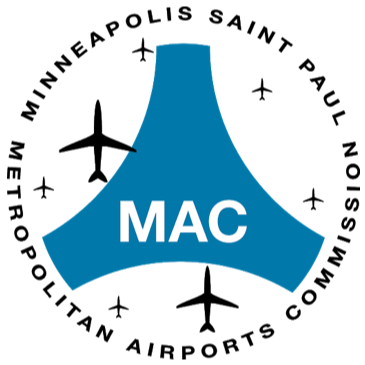

Agency overview
- Formed: July 6, 1943; 82 years ago
- Preceding agency: Minneapolis Park Board
- Type: Airport authority
- Headquarters: 6040 28th Avenue South; Minneapolis, MN 55450
- Employees: 700+
- Website: metroairports.org

The Minneapolis-Saint Paul Metropolitan Airports Commission (MAC) is a state-level airport authority that operates the Minneapolis–Saint Paul International Airport and six reliever airports in the Twin Cities region, which primarily provide service to private individuals and businesses, but also have regional transportation service.

== Background ==
The MAC is a governmental agency of the State of Minnesota. Twelve of its commissioners are appointed by the governor. The mayors of the cities of Minneapolis and St. Paul or their designees are also members of the commission. Four of the commissioners must be residents of outstate Minnesota (outside the Twin Cities metropolitan area).

== Records ==
Surveys, studies, planning documents, brochures, proposals, and reports documenting aspects of the commission's activities are available for research use. They include information regarding initial planning, disaster preparedness, studies and proposals for a second major airport site, accessibility to airport facilities, airport noise, the downtown St. Paul airport, Minneapolis-St. Paul International Airport, deregulation, finance and bonding, personnel, parking and traffic potential, public relations, dual track airport planning, and relations with Northwest Airlines, particularly in relation to the public financing for construction of its Hibbing/Duluth repair facilities.

MAC-operated airports
| Airport | IATA | ICAO | FAA | Location |
|---|---|---|---|---|
| Airlake Airport | — | KLVN | LVN | Lakeville |
| Anoka County-Blaine Airport | — | KANE | ANE | Blaine |
| Crystal Airport | MIC | KMIC | MIC | Crystal |
| Flying Cloud Airport | FCM | KFCM | FCM | Eden Prairie |
| Lake Elmo Airport | — | — | 21D | Lake Elmo, Minnesota |
| Minneapolis-Saint Paul International Airport | MSP | KMSP | MSP | Fort Snelling |
| St. Paul Downtown Airport | STP | KSTP | STP | Saint Paul |
