= Lake Elmo Airport =

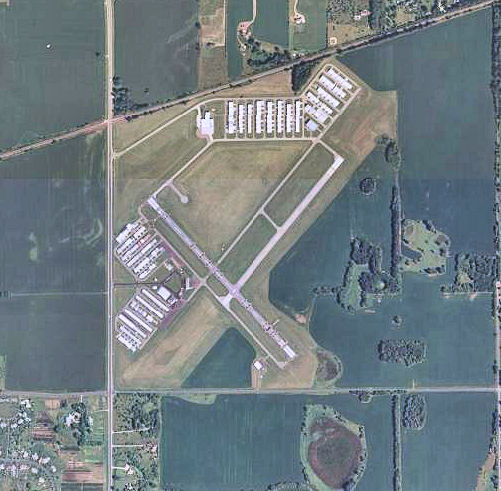
- 2006 USGS orthophoto
- IATA: none; ICAO: none; FAA LID: 21D

Summary
- Airport type: Public
- Operator: Metropolitan Airports Commission
- Serves: St. Paul, Minnesota
- Location: Baytown Township, Washington County, near Lake Elmo, Minnesota
- Elevation AMSL: 932 ft / 284 m
- Coordinates: 44°59′51″N 92°51′20″W

Map
- Location of airport in Minnesota / United States 21D (the United States)

Runways
Direction	Length		Surface
Direction	ft	m	Surface
14/32	3,500	1,067	Asphalt
4/22	2,496	761	Asphalt

Statistics
- Aircraft operations (2019): 26,498
- Based aircraft (2022): 169
- Source: Federal Aviation Administration

Lake Elmo Airport (FAA LID: 21D) is a public airport located just outside the city of Lake Elmo in Washington County, Minnesota, United States, about 12 miles east of the central business district of St. Paul. Although most airports in the United States use the same three-letter location identifier for the FAA and International Air Transport Association (IATA), this airport is assigned 21D by the FAA but has no designation from the IATA or ICAO. It is home to the Civil Air Patrol squadron NCR-MN-122.

It is included in the Federal Aviation Administration (FAA) National Plan of Integrated Airport Systems for 2021–2025 in which it is categorized as a regional general aviation facility.

== History ==
During World War II the airfield was used by the United States Army Air Forces.

In 2022, the airport opened a new runway 14/32 which is 3,500 feet (1,067 m) long, it replaced an old runway which was 2,849 feet (868 m) long.

== Facilities and aircraft ==
Lake Elmo covers an area of 640 acres (259 ha) at an elevation of 932 feet (284 m) above mean sea level. It has two asphalt runways; 14/32 is 3,500 by 75 feet (1,067 x 23 m), and 4/22 is 2,496 by 75 feet (761 x 23 m).

For the 12-month period ending July 31, 2019, the airport had 26,498 aircraft operations, an average of 73 per day: 95% general aviation, 4% air taxi, and 1% military. In August 2022, there were 169 aircraft based at this airport: 162 single-engine, 4 multi-engine, and 3 helicopter.

== Superfund Site ==
The Lake Elmo Airport is connected to the contamination at the Baytown Township Ground Water Plume Superfund site. The site is listed due to trichloroethylene contamination of a groundwater aquifer used for local drinking water supplies.

== See also ==
- List of airports in Minnesota
- Minnesota World War II Army Airfields
