= St. Paul Downtown Airport =

St. Paul Downtown Airport Holman Field
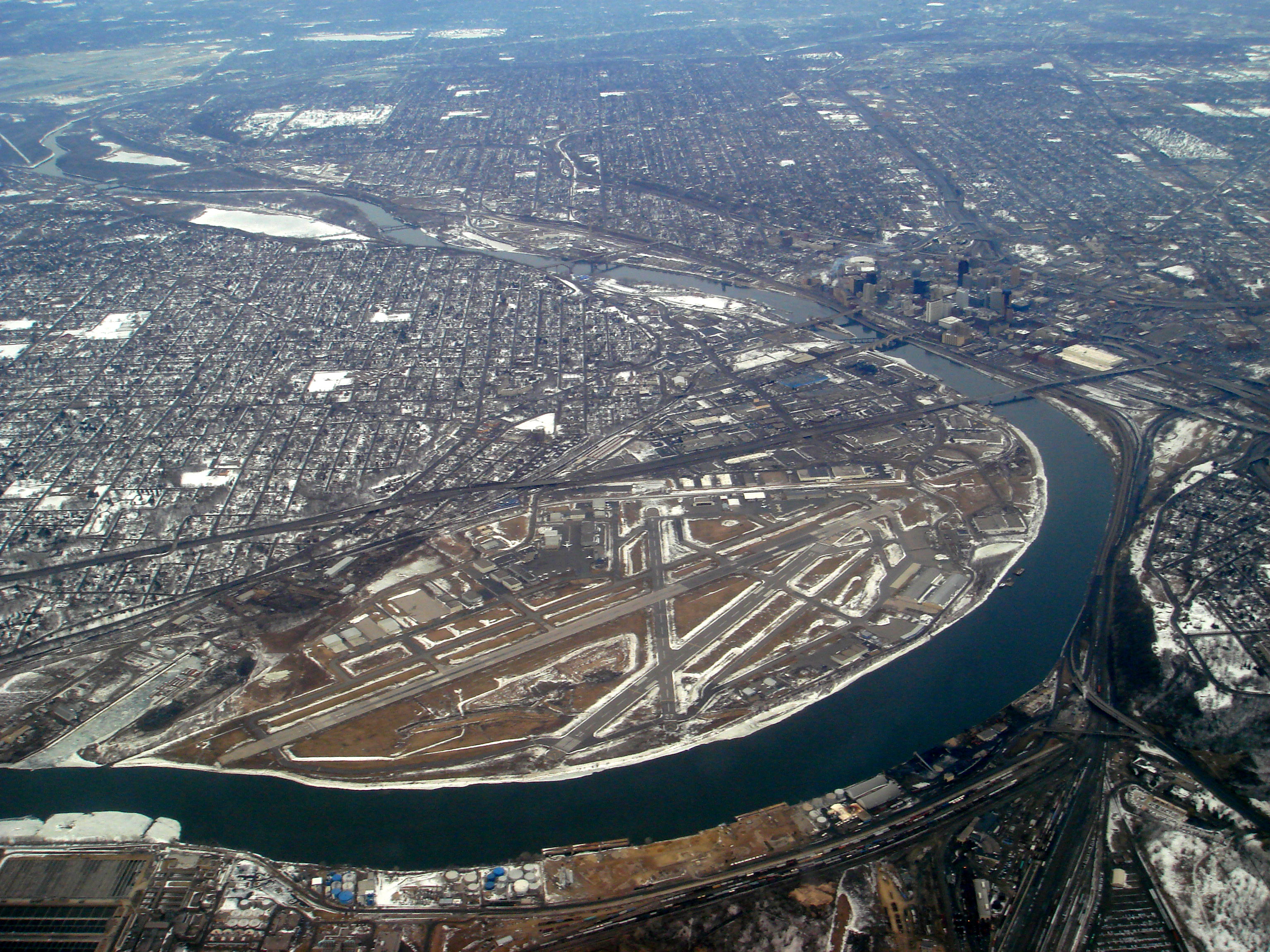
- Aerial photo of St. Paul Downtown Airport, with downtown St. Paul to the upper right, Mississippi River and MSP to the top left
- IATA: STP; ICAO: KSTP; FAA LID: STP

Summary
- Airport type: Public
- Owner: Metropolitan Airports Commission
- Serves: St. Paul, Minnesota
- Location: St. Paul, Minnesota, USA
- Elevation AMSL: 705 ft (215 m)
- Coordinates: 44°56′04″N 093°03′36″W

Map
- Location of airport in Minnesota / United States STP (the United States)

Runways
Direction	Length		Surface
Direction	ft	m	Surface
14/32	6,491	1,978	Asphalt
13/31	4,004	1,220	Asphalt
9/27	3,642	1,110	Asphalt

Statistics
- Aircraft operations (2014): 66,475
- Based aircraft (2017): 68
- Source: Federal Aviation Administration

St. Paul Downtown Airport (IATA: STP, ICAO: KSTP, FAA LID: STP), also known as Holman Field, is an airport just across the Mississippi River from downtown Saint Paul, Minnesota. It is one of several reliever airports in the Twin Cities operated by the Metropolitan Airports Commission. The airport has three runways and serves aircraft operated by corporations in the local area, a flight training school and the Minnesota Army National Guard aviation unit, as well as transient general aviation aircraft.

The airport is home to an installation of the Minnesota Army National Guard. Two properties at the airport are listed on the National Register of Historic Places: the 1939 Holman Field Administration Building and the 1942 Riverside Hangar.

== History ==
Holman Field was named for Charles W. "Speed" Holman (1898–1931), who was a stunt pilot, barnstormer, wing walker, parachutist, airmail pilot, aviation record holder and airline pilot. Born in Bloomington, he was the first pilot hired by Northwest Airways in 1926. In 1928, Holman set a world record of 1,433 consecutive loops in an airplane in five hours over the St. Paul Airport. He died in an accident during an air show in Omaha in 1931 at the age of 32.

During World War II, Northwest Airlines employed up to 5,000 people at the site, modifying new B-24 Liberator bombers, some of which received the highly classified H2X radar, which proved to be an invaluable tool in the European theater.

The terminal was used as a backdrop for scenes in the 1972 film Slaughterhouse-Five.

During the 1970s and early 1980s, commuter airline Lake State Airways offered scheduled airline service between the St. Paul Downtown Airport and Minneapolis–St. Paul International Airport in Minnesota. It cost US$5 for a one-way ticket between the two airports, and $10 round-trip. Capitol Air flew MDW-STP with a Swearingen Metroliner for roughly a year starting in December 1993.

== Facilities and aircraft ==
St. Paul Downtown Holman Field covers an area of 540 acres (220 ha) which contains three asphalt paved runways: 14/32 measuring 6,491 x 150 ft (1,978 x 46 m), 13/31 measuring 4,004 x 150 ft (1,220 x 46 m) and 9/27 measuring 3,642 x 100 ft (1,110 x 30 m).

For the 12-month period ending December 31, 2014, the airport had 66,475 aircraft operations, an average of 182 per day: 74% general aviation, 15% military and 11% air taxi. In January 2017, there were 68 aircraft based at this airport: 20 single-engine, 12 multi-engine, 18 jet, 7 helicopter and 11 military.

== Annual aircraft operations ==
Based on annual reports and data released by the Metropolitan Airports Commission, aircraft operations declined 65.3% in the decade 2011-2020.

Year	Aircraft operations	Percent Change
2011	87,229	N/A
2012	79,238	▼9.16%
2013	69,277	▼12.57%
2014	64,539	▼6.83%
2015	56,676	▼12.18%
2016	54,548	▼3.75%
2017	40,489	▼25.77%
2018	40,116	▼0.92%
2019	40,394	▲0.69%
2020	30,188	▼25.26%
2021	39,196	▲29.83%
2022	41,592	▲6.11%

== Charter Airlines ==
Airline	Services
NetJets	Charter
Executive Jet Management	Charter
Best Jets International	Charter/FBO
Delta Private Jets	Charter

== Flood wall considerations ==
Recently, local debate has ensued over plans to build a flood wall around the airport. In 1993, 1997, and 2001, the airport was flooded due to its proximity to the Mississippi River. Supporters do not want to deal with the future inconvenience of having to deal with the flood again, while critics say that the proposed wall would ruin views and make the airport "ugly". A dike to protect the airport from the nearby river was considered since the National Guard stated that they may leave if the dike is not constructed in a timely manner.

In 2009, a removable flood wall was installed that is only erected when flooding is imminent, leaving the views of the river intact for the rest of the year. Steel plates are embedded in the concrete on the river side of the runways. The flood wall is composed of steel posts that anchor to the embedded plates and aluminum planks that are stacked between the posts to form a flood barrier. These are then removed and stored when the flood event has passed.

== Gallery ==
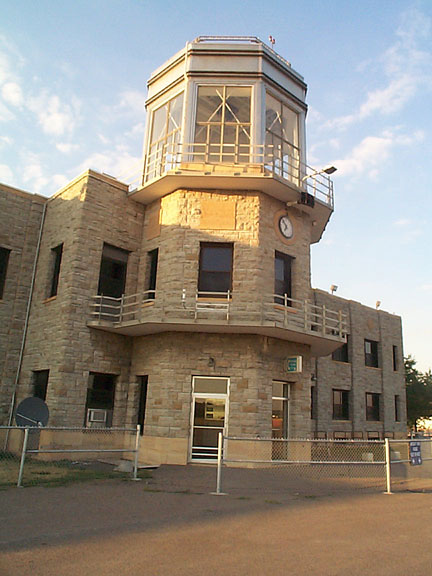
Holman Field administration building with historic control tower

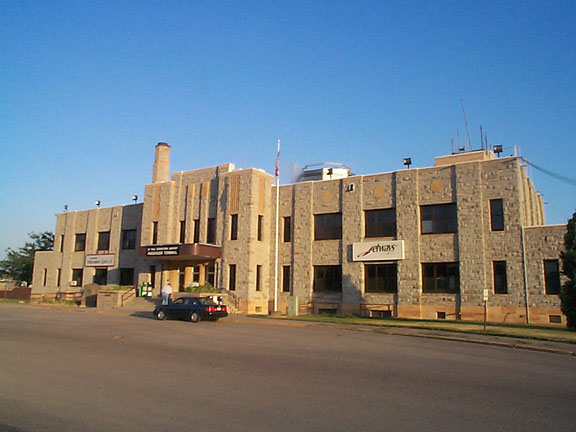
Holman Field administration building

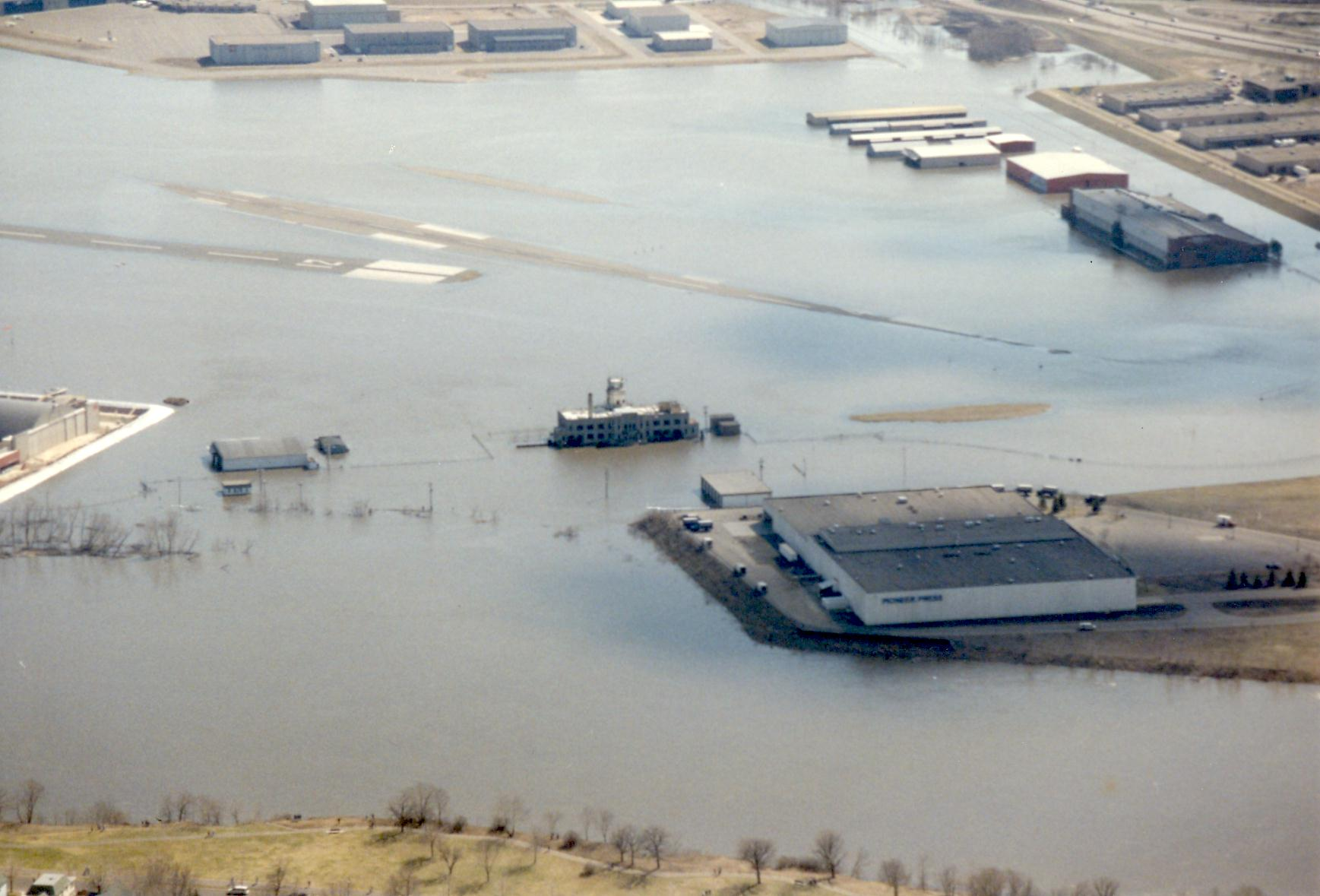
1990s flood

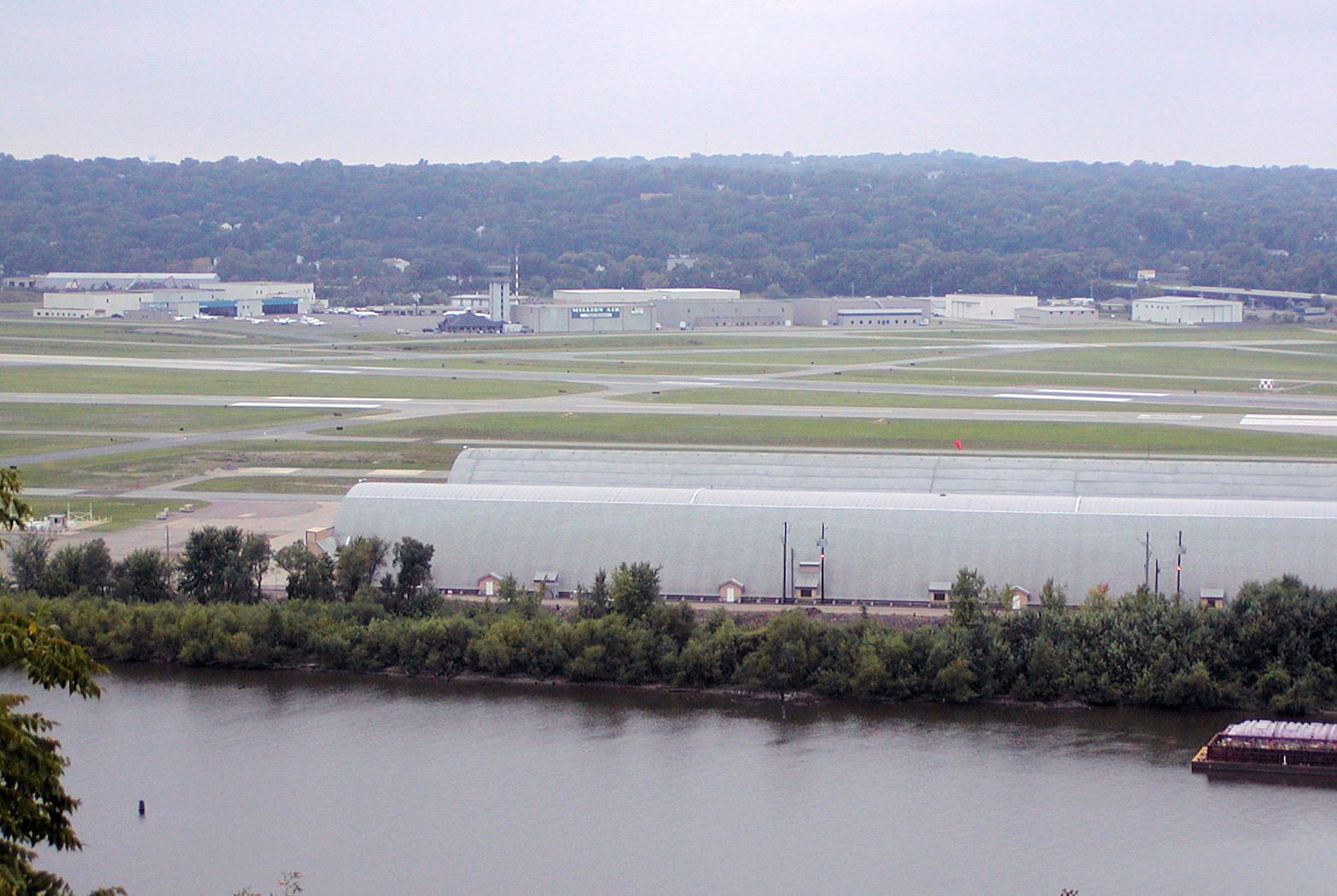
St. Paul Downtown Airport

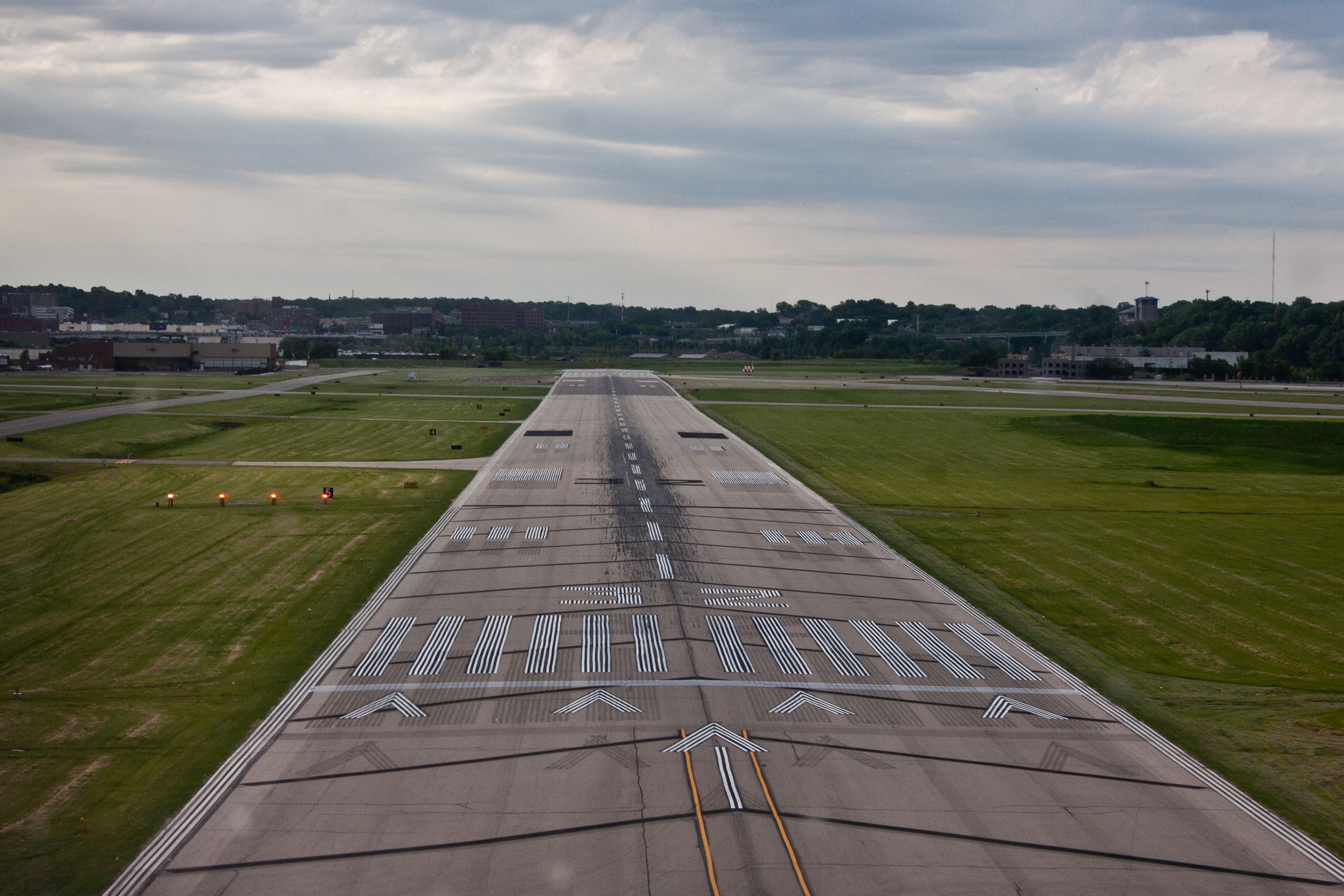
View from a plane landing on runway 32 at Holman Field

== See also ==
- List of airports in Minnesota
- Minnesota World War II Army Airfields
