= Mary Giuliani Stephens =

American attorney and politician

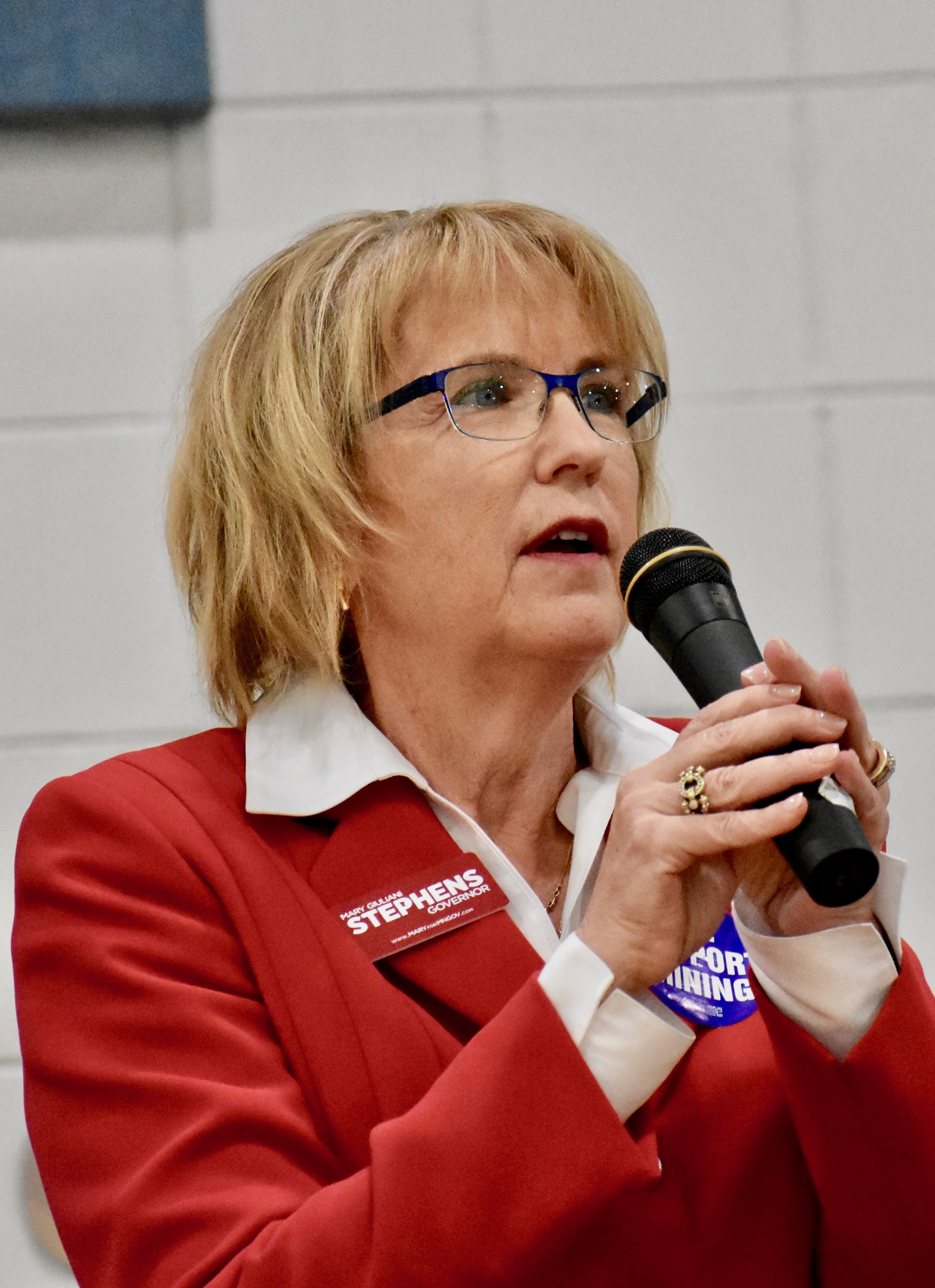

Mayor of Woodbury
- In office January 12, 2011 – December 31, 2018
- Preceded by: Bill Hargis
- Succeeded by: Anne Burt

Personal details
- Born: June 23, 1955 (age 69); Pennsylvania, U.S.
- Political party: Republican
- Spouse: Greg Stephens
- Children: 2
- Education: University of Michigan (BA); William Mitchell College of Law (JD)

Mary Giuliani Stephens (born June 23, 1955) is an American attorney and the former mayor of Woodbury, Minnesota. She previously served on the Woodbury City Council.

== Early life, education, and career ==
Giuliani Stephens grew up in Rochester, Minnesota, where her father was a physician at the Mayo Clinic, and graduated from Mayo High School in 1973. After graduating with her bachelor's degree in political science from the University of Michigan in 1977, she attended William Mitchell College of Law, where she earned her juris doctor in 1981.

Giuliani Stephens spent more than 25 years at Moore, Costello & Hart in Saint Paul specializing in construction litigation before eventually becoming a partner in the law firm.

== Political campaigns ==
=== Woodbury City Council ===
In 2005, in her first run for public office, Giuliani Stephens was elected to the Woodbury City Council

=== Mayor of Woodbury ===
Giuliani Stephens was elected mayor of Woodbury in 2010, succeeding longtime mayor Bill Hargis, who did not seek re-election. She was re-elected in 2014, when she ran uncontested. She did not run for re-election in 2018.

=== 2018 gubernatorial campaign ===
On November 29, 2017, Giuliani Stephens announced she would seek the Republican nomination for governor of Minnesota. At the Republican state convention the following year, Giuliani Stephens suspended her campaign, instead throwing her support to the eventual Republican nominee Jeff Johnson.

=== 2020 Minnesota Senate campaign ===
On January 30, 2020, Giuliani Stephens announced she will seek the Republican nomination for Minnesota Senate in District 53, which is currently held by DFL incumbent Susan Kent.

== Personal life ==
Giuliani Stephens has been married to her husband, Greg, for more than 33 years. They have two adult children and two grandchildren and live in Woodbury.

== See also ==
- 2018 Minnesota gubernatorial election

Political offices
| Preceded by William Hargis | Mayor of Woodbury; 2011–2018 | Succeeded by Anne Burt |
