= Math and Science Academy (Woodbury, Minnesota) =

Location
- 8430 Woodbury Crossing; Woodbury, Washington, Minnesota 55125; United States; 44°54′47.3″N 92°56′7.7″W

Information
- School type: Charter
- Founded: 1999
- NCES School ID: 270016703035
- Director: Kate Hinton
- Teaching staff: 38.16 (FTE)
- Grades: 6–12
- Gender: coeducational
- Age: 11 to 18
- Enrollment: ~1,300 (2026-2027)
- Student to teacher ratio: 17.37
- Colors: Maroon, Black, Silver
- Sports: Cross Country, Track and Field, Basketball, Baseball, Nordic Skiing, Trap Shooting, Football, Soccer, Volleyball, Badminton
- Mascot: Dragon
- Team name: Dragons, Fighting Calculators
- Test average: 83.6 (Math), 96.4 (Reading)
- Newspaper: A Slice of Pi
- Yearbook: Mascada
- Budget: Publicly funded
- Website: www.mnmsa.org

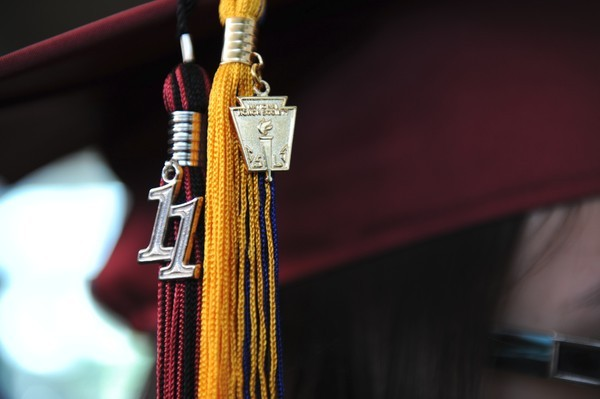
Graduation 2011

The Math and Science Academy (MSA) is a charter school that serves students in grades 6 through 12. It is located in the City Center neighborhood of Woodbury, Minnesota, United States. MSA is a tuition free public school open to any student in the state of Minnesota.

Subject areas include mathematics, science, humanities, and foreign language. Students must pass complete programs in science and mathematics including biology, chemistry, physics, algebra, geometry, trigonometry, and calculus. Graduates meet or exceed the Minnesota Graduation Standards in all areas. Students may be moved into a different mathematics course level depending on performance.

Since its founding, MSA has encouraged its juniors and seniors to take advantage of Minnesota's Post Secondary Enrollment Option, in which high school students can take courses at a college or university in Minnesota, tuition paid by the state of Minnesota. This option has been very popular among the upperclassmen. While there are often very few upper-level course offerings due to lack of demand, most MSA students will have already earned anywhere from 1 to 4 semesters of college credit upon graduation. More recently, MSA has also begun offering AP Calculus AB and BC, AP Computer Science Principles, AP Computer Science A, AP Physics B, AP Chemistry, and AP Biology.

== Extracurricular activities ==
- FIRST Robotics Competition
- FIRST Lego League Challenge
- FIRST Tech Challenge
- Science Bowl
- National Honor Society
- Theater
- Basketball
- Volleyball
- Chess club
- Africa club
- Spanish club
- Earth Club
- Knitting Club
- Art Club
- Nordic ski
- Choir
- Orchestra
- Badminton (girls)
- Cross country
- Track and field
- Math club
- Book club
- Engineering
- Poetry
- Young adult literature
- Art & Tech
- Study Skills
- Dungeons & Dragons Club
- Trap Shooting
- Experimental club
- Gender Sexuality Alliance
- Business Club
- SWENEXT
- Healthy Minds Club
- American Sign Language
- Debate
- Speech

== Rankings ==
MSA was ranked as the #1 Public High School in Minnesota and #1 Public Middle School in Minnesota by Niche in 2022. MSA was also ranked #1 in Minnesota High Schools and #27 Charter High Schools nationally by U.S. News & World Report in 2024.
