= Airlake Airport =

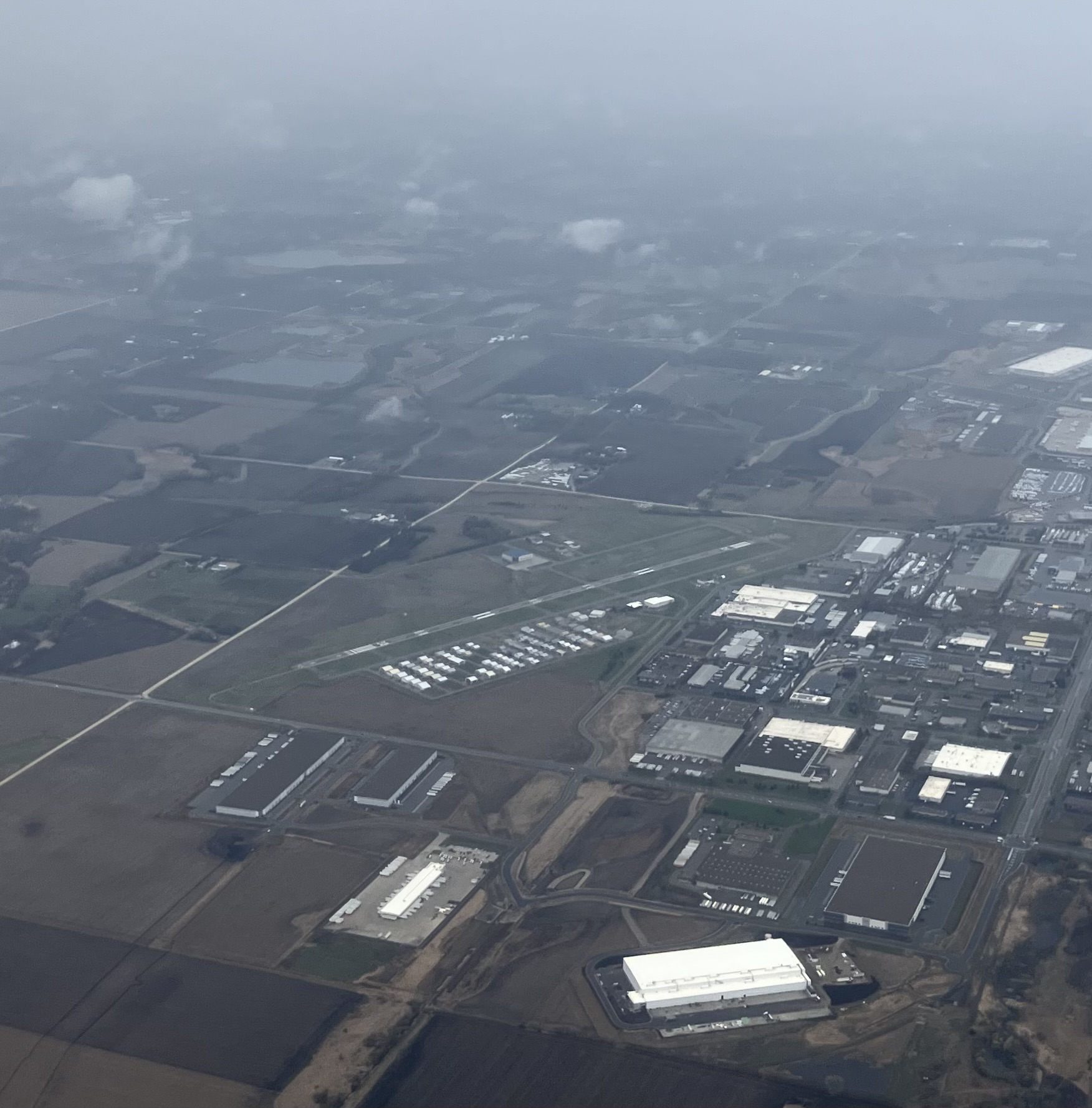
- IATA: none; ICAO: KLVN; FAA LID: LVN

Summary
- Airport type: Public
- Owner: Metropolitan Airports Commission
- Serves: Minneapolis–Saint Paul
- Location: Lakeville, Minnesota
- Elevation AMSL: 960 ft (290 m)
- Coordinates: 44°37′40″N 093°13′41″W

Map
- Location of airport in Minnesota / United States LVN (the United States)

Runways
Direction	Length		Surface
Direction	ft	m	Surface
12/30	4,099	1,249	Asphalt

Statistics
- Aircraft operations (2014): 34,174
- Based aircraft (2017): 108
- Source: Federal Aviation Administration

Airlake Airport (ICAO: KLVN, FAA LID: LVN) is a public use airport in Dakota County, Minnesota, United States. Owned by the Metropolitan Airports Commission, It is approximately 20 miles (32 km) south of both downtown Minneapolis and downtown St. Paul The airport is located near the Twin Cities suburbs of Lakeville and Farmington.

This facility is included in the National Plan of Integrated Airport Systems for 2017–2021, which categorized it as a general aviation reliever airport.

Although many U.S. airports use the same three-letter location identifier for the FAA and IATA, this airport is assigned LVN by the FAA but has no designation from the IATA.

== Facilities and aircraft ==
Airlake Airport covers an area of 425 acres (172 ha) at an elevation of 960 feet (293 m) above mean sea level. It has one runway designated 12/30 with an asphalt surface measuring 4,099 by 75 feet (1,249 x 23 m).

Future plans include new hangars in the southwest corner of the airfield, expanding the primary runway to 4,600 feet (1,400 m) and developing a 2,500-foot (760 m) crosswind runway.

The airport hosts one fixed-base operator (FBO), Waypoint Flight Services and a flight school, Aloft Aviation.

For the 12-month period ending December 31, 2014, the airport had 34,174 aircraft operations, an average of 94 per day, 95% general aviation, 4% air taxi and 1% military. In January 2017, there were 108 aircraft based at this airport: 99 single-engine and 9 multi-engine.

== See also ==
- List of airports in Minnesota
