= Anoka County–Blaine Airport =

Anoka County–Blaine Airport Janes Field
- IATA: none; ICAO: KANE; FAA LID: ANE

Summary
- Airport type: Public
- Owner: Metropolitan Airports Commission
- Serves: Minneapolis–Saint Paul, U.S.
- Location: Blaine, Minnesota, U.S.
- Elevation AMSL: 912 ft (278 m)
- Coordinates: 45°08′42″N 093°12′37″W

Map
- Location of airport in Minnesota ANE (the United States)

Runways
Direction	Length		Surface
Direction	ft	m	Surface
9/27	5,000	1,524	Asphalt
18/36	4,855	1,480	Asphalt

Statistics
- Aircraft operations (2015): 70,202
- Based aircraft (2017): 328
- Source: Federal Aviation Administration

Anoka County–Blaine Airport (ICAO: KANE, FAA LID: ANE), also known as Janes Field, is a public use airport in Anoka County, Minnesota, United States. Owned by Metropolitan Airports Commission, it is 10 nautical miles (19 km) north of the central business district of Minneapolis. The airport is located in the city of Blaine.

This facility is included in the National Plan of Integrated Airport Systems for 2017–2021, which categorized it as a general aviation reliever airport.

This airport is assigned a three-letter location identifier of ANE by the Federal Aviation Administration, but it does not have an International Air Transport Association (IATA) airport code (the IATA assigned ANE to Angers – Marcé Airport in France).

== Facilities and aircraft ==
Anoka County–Blaine Airport covers an area of 1,900 acres (769 ha) at an elevation of 912 feet (278 m) above mean sea level. It has two runways with asphalt surfaces: 9/27 is 5,000 by 100 feet(1,524 x 30 m) and 18/36 is 4,855 by 100 feet (1,480 x 30 m).

The non-federal control tower is open 0700-2100 local time in winter months (from October to April) and 0700-2200 local time in summer months (from May to September).

For the 12-month period ending June 30, 2015, the airport had 70,202 aircraft operations, an average of 192 per day: 92% general aviation, 7% air taxi and just less than 1% military. In May 2017, there were 328 aircraft based at this airport: 272 single-engine, 38 multi-engine, 10 jet and 8 helicopter.

The airport is home to the FBO Atlantic Aviation.

The airport is home to the Golden Wings Flying Museum and formerly the American Wings Air Museum.

In 2020 the airport received a $157,000 CARES Act award.

On April 30, 2020 a FAA Airport Improvement Program Grant of $646,583 was awarded to rehabilitate taxiway lighting at the airport.

== Accidents and incidents ==
As of 2025, there has been only one recorded incident within 10km (6.2mi) of the airport.

On March 29, 2025, a SOCATA TBM-700 registered as N721MB originating from Des Moines International Airport and bound for Blaine, crashed into a house in Brooklyn Park, killing the sole occupant on board Terry Dolan. Both the house and aircraft were destroyed and all occupants in the house escaped without harm.

== See also ==
- List of airports in Minnesota
