= Lake Elmo, Minnesota =

City in Minnesota, United States

Lake Elmo
- City
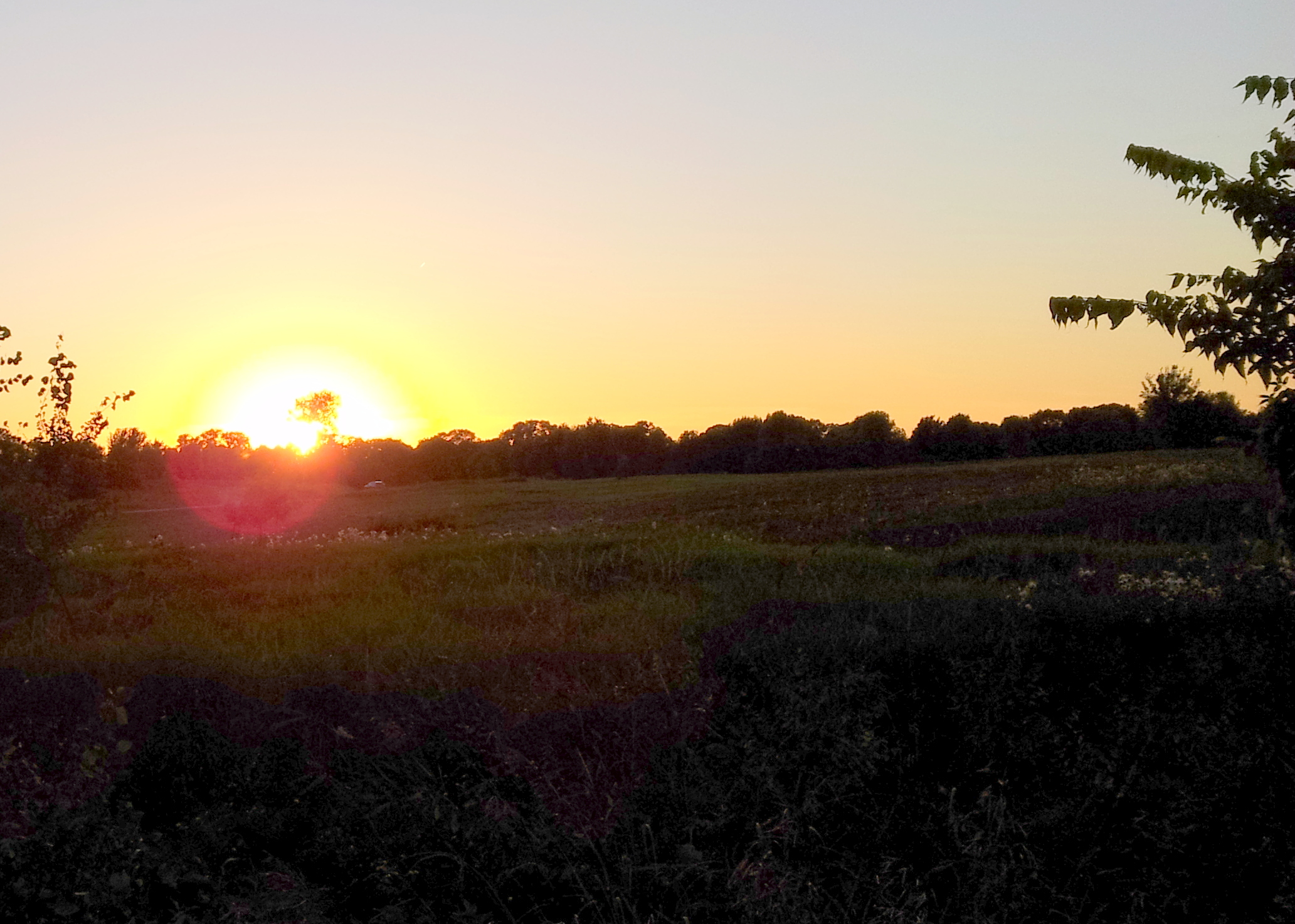
- Lake Elmo Park Reserve in Lake Elmo

- Location of the city of Lake Elmo within Washington County, Minnesota
- Coordinates: 44°59′56″N 92°54′34″W
- Country: United States
- State: Minnesota
- County: Washington
- Founded: 1925

Government
  - Mayor: Charles Cadenhead

Area
  - Total: 24.19 sq mi (62.64 km^{2})
  - Land: 22.09 sq mi (57.22 km^{2})
  - Water: 2.09 sq mi (5.42 km^{2})
- Elevation: 938 ft (286 m)

Population (2020)
  - Total: 11,335
  - Estimate (2024): 14,161
  - Density: 513/sq mi (198.1/km^{2})
- Time zone: UTC-6 (Central)
  - Summer (DST): UTC-5 (CDT)
- ZIP code: 55042
- Area code: 651
- FIPS code: 27-34244
- GNIS feature ID: 2395589
- Website: www.lakeelmo.gov

Lake Elmo is a city in Washington County, Minnesota, United States. The population was 11,335 at the 2020 census. According to 2022 census estimates, the population is 13,449.

Much of the area within the city limits is still farmland, giving the city a rural appearance. After the city lost a lawsuit against the Metropolitan Council, a regional planning authority, the Minnesota Supreme Court in 2005 ordered that it had to compile a plan in accordance with the Council's regional development guide. Lake Elmo's population is rapidly growing. It is projected to be over 21,000 by 2040.

== History ==
The city took its name from nearby Lake Elmo. Lake Elmo began with one farm in 1852 on the southwest corner of the intersection of what is now Manning Avenue and 30th Street, just southeast of downtown Lake Elmo and across the highway from the Lake Elmo Airport (FAA LID: 21D). The barn was built in 1875 and restored as a house in 1998. The 1852 farmhouse was intentionally burned down in 2007.

== Government ==
Lake Elmo has a city council consisting of a mayor and four council members. The council has the legislative authority and determines all matters of policy. The mayor and council members are elected to four-year terms. The city also has a park commission and a planning commission. The park commission advises the city council on issues of development, improvement, and maintenance of the city's parks and trails. The planning commission makes recommendations about the Comprehensive Plan and amendments to the plan, site plans, subdivisions, conditional use permits, planning, zoning and sign regulations, open space preservation developments, and other planning-related issues.

Council members are Mike Charles Cadenhead (mayor), Jeff Holtz, Katrina Beckstrom, Dale Dorschner, and Lisa McGinn. Planning Commission members are Charles Cadenhead (chair), Jeff Holtz, Jordan Graen, Kyle Risner, Brian Steil, Kathy Weeks, and Brandon Mueller. Park Commission members are John Ames, Jean Olinger, Barry Weeks, John Mayek, Isak Nightingale, and Steve Schumacher.

== Geography ==
According to the United States Census Bureau, the city has an area of 24.36 square miles (63.09 km^{2}); 22.25 square miles (57.63 km^{2}) is land and 2.11 square miles (5.46 km^{2}) is water.

Minnesota State Highway 36 runs east–west along Lake Elmo's northern boundary. Interstate 94 runs east–west along Lake Elmo's southern boundary. County State-Aid Highway 14 serves as the main east-west route and County State-Aid Highway 17 as the main north-south route.

== Sports ==
Cimarron Rowing Club is a grassroots effort to develop the sport in the east metro/Stillwater area. The club trains on Lake Elmo and competes nationally and internationally. Crews and individual scullers compete at events such as the Head of the Charles Regatta, Henley Masters (UK), The Silver Skiff (Turin) and the annual World Masters Regatta.

== Demographics ==
Historical population
Census	Pop.	Note	%±
1930	218		—
1940	265		21.6%
1950	386		45.7%
1960	550		42.5%
1970	3,565		548.2%
1980	5,296		48.6%
1990	5,903		11.5%
2000	6,863		16.3%
2010	8,069		17.6%
2020	11,335		40.5%
2024 (est.)	14,161		24.9%
U.S. Decennial Census; 2020 Census

=== 2020 census ===
As of the 2020 census, Lake Elmo had a population of 11,335. The median age was 41.6 years. 25.5% of residents were under the age of 18 and 16.0% of residents were 65 years of age or older. For every 100 females there were 97.5 males, and for every 100 females age 18 and over there were 95.0 males age 18 and over.

66.2% of residents lived in urban areas, while 33.8% lived in rural areas.

There were 4,004 households in Lake Elmo, of which 35.5% had children under the age of 18 living in them. Of all households, 69.4% were married-couple households, 9.7% were households with a male householder and no spouse or partner present, and 16.0% were households with a female householder and no spouse or partner present. About 15.8% of all households were made up of individuals and 8.2% had someone living alone who was 65 years of age or older.

There were 4,324 housing units, of which 7.4% were vacant. The homeowner vacancy rate was 3.1% and the rental vacancy rate was 5.6%.

Racial composition as of the 2020 census
Race	Number	Percent
White	9,329	82.3%
Black or African American	201	1.8%
American Indian and Alaska Native	59	0.5%
Asian	632	5.6%
Native Hawaiian and Other Pacific Islander	1	0.0%
Some other race	433	3.8%
Two or more races	680	6.0%
Hispanic or Latino (of any race)	761	6.7%

=== 2010 census ===
As of the census of 2010, there were 8,069 people, 2,779 households, and 2,252 families living in the city. The population density was 362.7 inhabitants per square mile (140.0/km^{2}). There were 2,877 housing units at an average density of 129.3 per square mile (49.9/km^{2}). The racial makeup of the city was 92.3% White, 0.8% African American, 0.3% Native American, 3.3% Asian, 1.3% from other races, and 1.9% from two or more races. Hispanic or Latino of any race were 3.5% of the population.

There were 2,779 households, of which 38.0% had children under the age of 18 living with them, 70.7% were married couples living together, 6.8% had a female householder with no husband present, 3.6% had a male householder with no wife present, and 19.0% were non-families. 14.9% of all households were made up of individuals, and 4.6% had someone living alone who was 65 years of age or older. The average household size was 2.88 and the average family size was 3.21.

The median age in the city was 42.4 years. 27.1% of residents were under the age of 18; 6.3% were between the ages of 18 and 24; 20.9% were from 25 to 44; 34.6% were from 45 to 64; and 11% were 65 years of age or older. The gender makeup of the city was 50.2% male and 49.8% female.

=== 2000 census ===
As of the census of 2000, there were 6,863 people, 2,347 households, and 1,924 families living in the city. The population density was 300.4 inhabitants per square mile (116.0/km^{2}). There were 2,389 housing units at an average density of 104.6 per square mile (40.4/km^{2}). The racial makeup of the city was 95.82% White, 0.38% African American, 0.29% Native American, 1.75% Asian, 0.54% from other races, and 1.22% from two or more races. Hispanic or Latino of any race were 1.31% of the population.

There were 2,347 households, out of which 41.6% had children under the age of 18 living with them, 69.4% were married couples living together, 7.8% had a female householder with no husband present, and 18.0% were non-families. 13.1% of all households were made up of individuals, and 3.3% had someone living alone who was 65 years of age or older. The average household size was 2.91 and the average family size was 3.19.

The population had 29.2% under the age of 18, 7.2% from 18 to 24, 29.3% from 25 to 44, 27.3% from 45 to 64, and 7.0% who were 65 years of age or older. The median age was 37 years. For every 100 females, there were 102.7 males. For every 100 females age 18 and over, there were 101.9 males.

The median income for a household in the city was $76,876, and the median income for a family was $84,562. Males had a median income of $56,667 versus $32,564 for females. The per capita income for the city was $33,007. About 4.8% of families and 7.3% of the population were below the poverty line, including 12.6% of those under age 18 and 2.3% of those age 65 or over.

== Education ==
Most of Lake Elmo is part of the Stillwater School District (#834). The city is home to Lake Elmo Elementary School and Oak-Land Middle School.

Rasmussen College–Lake Elmo / Woodbury campus is in Lake Elmo and serves students in the surrounding areas. Rasmussen College is a career-focused, regionally accredited college that offers bachelor and associate degree programs. It focuses on programs in health sciences, nursing, criminal justice, technology and design, business, and early education.

== Baytown Township Groundwater Plume ==
The primary source area for the Baytown Township Groundwater Plume Contamination Superfund site is a property at 11325 Stillwater Boulevard in Lake Elmo. A metal-working facility used the property from 1940 to 1968. It is a Superfund site due to TCE contamination of a groundwater aquifer used for local drinking water.

== See also ==
- Lake Elmo
- Lake Elmo Airport
