= 93rd Minnesota Legislature =

Legislature of Minnesota, 2023–2025

←	92nd	94th	→
- The Seal of Minnesota

Overview
- Term: January 3, 2023 – May 20, 2024

Senate
- Members: 67 senators
- President: Bobby Joe Champion (DFL)
- Majority Leader: Kari Dziedzic (DFL) until February 6, 2024; Erin Murphy (DFL) after February 6, 2024
- Minority Leader: Mark Johnson (R)

House of Representatives
- Members: 134 representatives
- Speaker: Melissa Hortman (DFL)
- Majority Leader: Jamie Long (DFL)
- Minority Leader: Lisa Demuth (R)

Sessions
- 2023: January 3, 2023 – May 22, 2023
- 2024: February 12, 2024 – May 20, 2024

The Ninety-third Minnesota Legislature was the meeting of the legislative branch of the state of Minnesota, composed of the Minnesota Senate and the Minnesota House of Representatives between 2023 and 2024. It convened in Saint Paul on January 3, 2023 and adjourned sine die on May 20, 2024.

== Background ==
This was the first legislature to be fully DFL-controlled since the 88th Minnesota Legislature in 2013–15. During the first session (2023), the body passed a number of major reforms to Minnesota law, including requiring paid leave, banning noncompete agreements, cannabis legalization, increased spending on infrastructure and environmental protection, modernizing the state's tax code, codifying abortion rights, universal free school meals, and universal gun background checks, among others. The Star Tribune called it "one of the most consequential" ever in Minnesota, while Governor Tim Walz stated that it was the "most productive session in Minnesota history." Some journalists compared the session to the 67th Minnesota Legislature, which from 1971–1973 enacted major changes to school finance known as the "Minnesota Miracle".

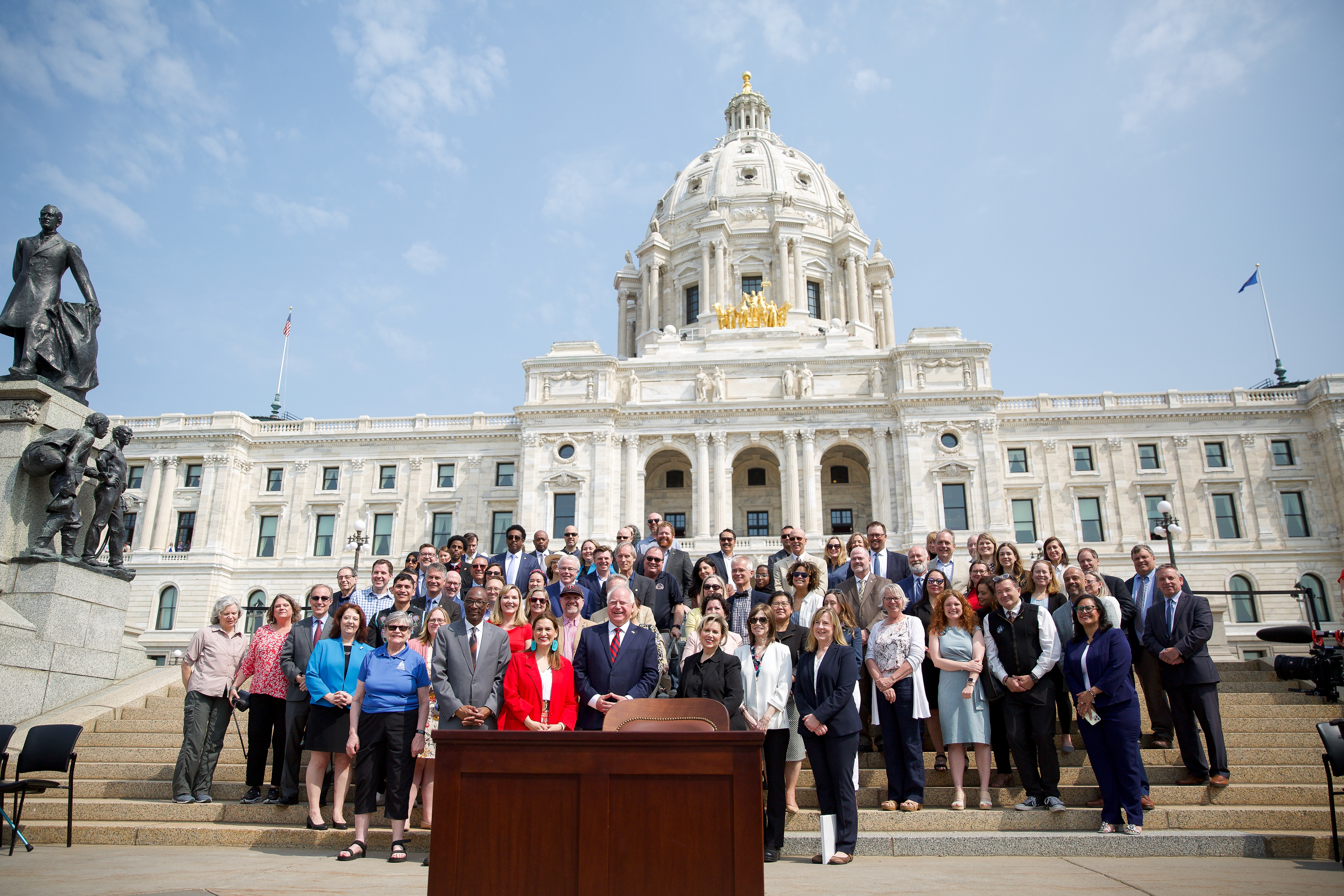
Governor Walz, Lieutenant Governor Flanagan, and DFL lawmakers holding a ceremonial bill signing of the major legislation of the 2023 legislative session

At the Minnesota Chamber of Commerce's session priorities gathering in St. Paul in early 2024, the state's four legislative leaders expressed opposition to changing the law to allow strong beer in grocery stores and a constitutional amendment for a full-time Legislature.

The second legislative session (2024) began in February. Given the $72 billion two-year budget adopted in the previous session, the primary agenda for the second session was the passage of new policy initiatives. There was legislative success in refining the state's newly legalized adult-use cannabis market to streamline the licensing process and to provide clarity to businesses regarding employee drug testing. Other significant changes made involved the role and responsibilities of school resource officers, banning shadow noncompetes, establishing unemployment benefits for striking workers, and requiring companies to post salary ranges for jobs. Another central task for the session was the assembly of a public construction bill to finance infrastructure projects. However, lawmakers did not pass it before the end of session deadline. A sanctuary state bill to limit state cooperation with ICE was introduced, but was not considered. An Equal Rights Amendment ballot measure passed the House, but was not voted on in the Senate.

== Major events ==
- January 3, 2023: On the first day of the 93rd Minnesota Legislature, new legislators were sworn in in person for the first time since the COVID-19 pandemic.
- April 19, 2023: Governor Tim Walz delivers his 2023 State of the State address to a joint sitting of the Legislature.
- March 26, 2024: Governor Walz delivered his 2024 State of the State address at Owatonna High School.
- May 20, 2024: The 2024 session concluded with the passage of a 1,430-page "mega-omnibus bill" (HF 5247), barely meeting a midnight constitutional deadline for legislative business. The bill's text faced vocal opposition and significant amounts of attempted amendments from Republicans throughout the session. It passed both chambers along party lines only a few minutes before the end of session.

== Major legislation ==
=== 2023 session ===
==== Enacted in 2023 ====
- January 31, 2023: Prohibiting discrimination based on hair texture (CROWN Act) (Laws 2023, Chapter 3 – H.F. 37 / S.F. 44)
- January 31, 2023: Protect Reproductive Options Act (Laws 2023, chapter 4 – H.F. 1 / S.F. 1 )
- February 3, 2023: Recognizing Juneteenth as a State Holiday Act (Laws 2023, chapter 5 – H.F. 48 / S.F. 44)
- February 7, 2023: Renewable and carbon free electricity standards act (Laws 2023, chapter 7 – H.F. 7 / S.F. 4)
- March 3, 2023: Voting rights restoration for felons on parole act (Laws 2023, chapter 12 – H.F. 28 / S.F. 26)
- March 7, 2023: Driver's Licenses for All Act (Laws 2023, chapter 13 – H.F. 4 / S.F. 27)
- March 16, 2023: ICWA Codification Act (Laws 2023, chapter 16 – H.F. 1071 / S.F. 667)
- March 17, 2023: Universal Free School Meals Act (Laws 2023, chapter 18 – H.F. 5 / S.F. 123)
- April 27, 2023: Conversion Therapy Ban Act (Laws 2023, chapter 28 – H.F. 16 / S.F. 23)
- April 27, 2023: Trans Refuge Act (Laws 2023, chapter 29 – H.F. 146 / S.F. 63)
- April 27, 2023: Reproductive Freedom Defense Act (Laws 2023, chapter 31 – H.F. 366 / S.F. 165)
- May 5, 2023: Democracy for the People Act (Laws 2023, chapter 34 – H.F. 3 / S.F. 3)
- Omnibus appropriations acts
  - May 15, 2023: Omnibus housing act (Laws 2023, chapter 37 – H.F. 2335 / S.F. 2566)
  - May 15, 2023: Omnibus veterans and military affairs act (Laws 2023, chapter 38 – H.F. 1937 / S.F. 2247)
  - May 16, 2023: Omnibus agriculture and rural broadband act (Laws 2023, chapter 43 – S.F. 1955 / H.F. 2278)
  - May 19, 2023: Omnibus legacy act (Laws 2023, chapter 40 – H.F. 1999 / S.F. 1682)
  - May 19, 2023: Omnibus judiciary and public safety act (Laws 2023, chapter 52 – S.F. 2909 / H.F. 2890)
  - May 24, 2023: Omnibus higher education act (Laws 2023, chapter 41- H.F. 2073/S.F. 2075)
  - May 24, 2023: Omnibus jobs and economic development act (Laws 2023, chapter 53 – S.F. 3035/H.F. 3028)
  - May 24, 2023: Omnibus early education act (Laws 2023, chapter 54 – H.F. 2292 / S.F. 2373)
  - May 24, 2023: Omnibus K-12 education act (Laws 2023, chapter 55 – H.F. 2497 / S.F. 2684)
  - May 24, 2023: Omnibus commerce act (Laws 2023, chapter 57 – S.F. 2744 / H.F. 2680)
  - May 24, 2023: Omnibus environment, climate, and energy act (Laws 2023, chapter 60 – H.F. 2310 / S.F. 2348)
  - May 24, 2023: Omnibus human services act (Laws 2023, chapter 61 – S.F. 2934 / H.F. 2847)
  - May 24, 2023: Omnibus state government act (Laws 2023, chapter 62 H.F. 1830 / S.F. 1426)
  - May 24, 2023: Omnibus transportation act (Laws 2023, chapter 68 – H.F. 2887 / S.F. 3157)
  - May 24, 2023: Omnibus health and human services act (Laws 2023, chapter 70 – S.F. 2995 / H.F. 2930)
- May 16, 2023: Lead pipe replacement funding act (Laws 2023, chapter 39 – H.F. 24 / S.F. 30)
- May 24, 2023: Deepfake regulation act (Laws 2023, chapter 58 – H.F. 1370 / S.F. 1394)
- May 24, 2023: Paid Family and Medical Leave (Laws 2023, chapter 59 – H.F. 2 / S.F. 2)
- May 24, 2023: Omnibus tax act (Laws 2023, chapter 64 – H.F. 1938 / S.F. 1811)
- May 24, 2023: Nursing home emergency aid act (Laws 2023, chapter 74 – H.F. 3342 / S.F. 3363)
- May 24, 2023: Nurse and Patient Safety Act (Laws 2023, chapter 75 – S.F. 1384 / H.F. 1522)
- May 24, 2023: Omnibus State government finance bill (Laws 2023, chapter 62 -- HF 1830 / SF 1426)
- May 30, 2023: Legalizing Adult-Use Cannabis (Laws 2023, chapter 63 – H.F. 100 / S.F. 73)
- June 1, 2023: Omnibus capital investment cash appropriations act (Laws 2023, chapter 71 – H.F. 670 / S.F. 676)
- June 1, 2023: Omnibus capital investment borrowing act (Laws 2023, chapter 72 – H.F. 669/S.F. 676)

==== Proposed in 2023 ====
Boldface indicates the bill was passed by its house of origin.

- Legalizing Affordable Housing Act (H.F. 3256 / S.F. 3259)
- Sports betting legalization (H.F. 2000 / S.F. 1949)
- Proposed constitutional amendment guaranteeing equality under law (**S.F. 37** / H.F. 173)
- Ranked Choice Voting (H.F. 2486 / S.F. 2270)
- Great Start Child Care Credit (H.F. 9 / S.F. 9)
- Social security tax; total elimination (H.F. 300 / S.F. 15)
- Supermajority vote needed to raise revenue (H.F. 2221 / S.F. 1838)

==== Vetoed in 2023 ====
- May 25, 2023: Protections for rideshare workers bill (H.F. 2369 / S.F. 2319)

=== 2024 session ===
==== Enacted in 2024 ====
- May 7, 2024: Event ticket price transparency act (Laws 2024, chapter 94 - H.F. 1989 / S.F. 2003)
- May 15, 2024: Rights and compensation for minors in internet content act (Laws 2024, chapter 103 - H.F. 3488 / S.F. 3496)
- Omnibus policy and supplemental appropriations acts
  - May 17, 2024: Omnibus education policy act (Laws 2024, chapter 109 - S.F. 3567 / H.F. 3782)
  - May 17, 2024: Omnibus elections act (Laws 2024, chapter 112 - H.F. 4772 / S.F. 4729)
  - May 18, 2024: Education supplemental budget act (Laws 2024, chapter 115 - H.F. 5237 / S.F. 5252)
  - May 19, 2024: Environment and natural resources supplemental budget act (Laws 2024, chapter 116 - H.F. 3911 / S.F. 3887)
  - May 19, 2024: Tax bill (Laws 2024, chapter 127 - H.F. 5247 / S.F. 5234)
  - May 23, 2024: Emergency medical services aid act (Laws 2024, chapter 122 - H.F. 4738 / S.F. 4835)
  - May 24, 2024: Tenant's Bill of Rights (Laws 2024, chapter 118 - S.F. 3492 / H.F. 3591)
  - May 24, 2024: Omnibus supplemental jobs and economic development act (Laws 2024, chapter 120 - S.F. 5289 / H.F. 5205)
  - May 24, 2024: Omnibus judiciary and public safety act (Laws 2024, chapter 123 - H.F. 5216 / S.F. 5337)
  - May 24, 2024: Omnibus higher education act (Laws 2024, chapter 124 - H.F. 4024 / S.F. 4003)
- May 18, 2024: Minnesota African American Family Preservation Act (Laws 2024, chapter 117 - H.F. 912 / S.F. 716)
- May 20, 2024: Junk fee prohibition act (Laws 2024, chapter 111 - H.F. 3438 / S.F. 3537)

==== Proposed in 2024 ====
- Local Voices Local Choices Act (S.F. 3868 / H.F. 3276)
- Independent redistricting commission (H.F. 4593 / S.F. 4894)
- Ban on rainbow flag bans (H.F. 4273 / S.F. 4652)
- Statewide upzoning bill (H.F. 4009 / S.F. 3964)
- Minnesota Equal Rights Amendment (H.F. 173 / S.F. 37)

== Legislative initiatives ==
=== 2023 session ===
In the 2023 legislative session in Minnesota, state lawmakers faced the task of creating a two-year state budget with a $17.5 billion surplus, significantly larger than in previous years. This led to a budget of $71.5 billion, a 40% increase over the previous period. Key financial decisions included $3 billion in tax relief measures, substantial investments in infrastructure totaling $2.6 billion, and significant expansions in social programs.

State funding for education increased by over $2.2 billion. The increase updated the per pupil funding formula and enhanced financial predictability for districts. The reform also tackled the long-standing issue of the cross subsidy for special education and English learner programs. Early childhood education received substantial attention, with $300 million allocated towards early education initiatives, managed by the newly created Department of Children, Youth and Families. This department consolidates several programs previously spread across different state agencies. Curricular changes included the addition of required courses in civics, personal finance, Holocaust and genocide studies, and ethnic studies. The Legislature also prohibited highly realistic active shooter drills, replacing them with violence prevention training. The reforms also provided for free breakfast and lunch for all students and mandates the provision of menstrual products and Naloxone in schools.

The $3 billion tax bill was one of the largest omnibus bills in the 2023 session. Components of the bill included rebate checks for 2.5 million Minnesotans, designed to return a portion of the surplus to taxpayers, but less than initially proposed by Governor Tim Walz. The legislation introduced a substantial child and working family tax credit intended to cut childhood poverty rates by a third, benefiting low-income families with phased-out credits based on income levels. Additionally, the bill made strides towards progressive taxation by eliminating state income tax on Social Security for over 75% of recipients. Other notable tax increases included a global intangible low-taxed income (GILTI) tax on businesses with global earnings and regional sales tax hikes in the Twin Cities metro area for housing and transportation initiatives. Moreover, the bill increased funding for local government aid, provided a boost to property tax refunds, and revived a historic tax credit for building renovations. It also expanded a film production tax credit to attract more film and television production to Minnesota.

=== 2024 session ===
The recreational cannabis law saw a substantial update, introducing a vetted lottery system for distributing licenses and allowing pre-approved licenses for early cultivation to ensure product availability when retail stores open next spring. Additionally, the prohibition on serving THC and alcoholic beverages within five hours was replaced with a rule against serving intoxicants to already intoxicated patrons. For medical cannabis, patients can now assign registered caregivers to grow up to eight plants on their behalf.

In transportation, labor, and housing, the session addressed the lawsuits against the Minneapolis 2040 comprehensive plan and limited the use of environmental laws to challenge future city plans. Aimed at combating worker misclassification, legislation now defines independent contractor qualifications and increases penalties for fraud. The session also set statewide standards for ride-share driver pay rates, preempting local control and ensuring increased pay for drivers.

Regarding public safety, the legislature allowed limited use of prone restraints in schools and increasing penalties for gun straw purchases. Binary triggers, which allow firearms to fire on both trigger pull and release, were banned.

In social media and child protection, Minnesota became the first state to ban profiting from social media accounts featuring children, requiring profits to be set aside for the children when they turn 18, with exceptions for child actors and models.

The session allocated $24 million for emergency medical services (EMS) in greater Minnesota, $6 million for a pilot program in the Northeast, and created a new Office of Emergency Medical Services. Consumer protection saw the passage of the 'Taylor Swift bill,' mandating ticket sellers list full prices upfront, and the Debt Fairness Act, which bans reporting medical debt to credit bureaus and prevents withholding treatment due to unpaid debt.

Environmental and health legislation included requiring consultation between the Met Council and the MnDOT on light rail projects, prioritizing land sales within reservation boundaries to Indian reservations, and allocating $5.8 million for nitrate pollution mitigation. The state aims to reduce nitrogen fertilizer purchases by 25% by 2030. Funding was also provided for ATV trail construction and ice rescue operations.

Broadband development legislation prioritized grant applications from organizations adhering to specific labor rules, though it faced opposition from the Minnesota Cable Communications Association. Health and education saw midwives being allowed to administer certain medications, permitting Native American smudging ceremonies in schools, and requiring health plans to cover medically necessary gender-affirming care with some religious exemptions. Schools must implement cell phone policies by March 2025, and book bans based on viewpoint were prohibited.

Energy and waste management legislation required producers to contribute to state recycling programs and aimed to speed up permitting for clean energy projects. The Voting Rights Act added state protections against voter suppression and mandated courts to support voters. Lastly, legislation regulated and banned many so-called junk fees, requiring businesses to disclose the full price of products or services upfront.

The African American Family Preservation Act, renamed the Layla Jackson Law, focused initially on addressing the disproportionate number of African American children affected by child welfare practices but was expanded to include any child "disproportionately encountered, engaged, or identified in the child welfare system." The broader scope means that nearly all foster children in Minnesota will receive enhanced protections, similar to those afforded under the federal Indian Child Welfare Act, which applies only to Native American children.

Several key bills did not make it through the 2024 session. These include the Equal Rights Amendment, which aimed to protect gender rights and included provisions for abortion access and gender identity protections, passed the House but did not come to a Senate vote. Sports betting legislation was not finalized before the deadline, nor was a measure to allow strong beer sales in grocery stores. Additional measures that did not pass include: requiring cities to allow duplexes and triplexes in single-family zones; preventing landlords from rejecting tenants based on government rent vouchers; making Metropolitan Council members elected instead of appointed; local ranked choice voting expansion; establishing a statewide $15 minimum wage; and, allowing physician-assisted suicide in certain cases.

== Political composition ==
=== Senate ===
	Party (Shading indicates majority caucus)			Total	Vacant
	Republican	Independent	Democratic– Farmer–Labor	Total	Vacant
End of the previous Legislature	34	1	31	66	1
Begin 2023	33	0	34	67	0
Latest voting share	49%	0%	52%		

=== House of Representatives ===
	Party (Shading indicates majority caucus)		Total	Vacant
	Democratic– Farmer–Labor	Republican	Total	Vacant
End of the previous Legislature	70	64	134	0
Begin 2023	70	64	134	0
September 1, 2023	69	64	133	1
January 12, 2024	70	64	134	0
February 11, 2024	70	63	134	1
April 2, 2024	70	64	134	0
May 28, 2024	69	64	133	1
Latest voting share	51.5%	47.8%		

== Leadership ==
=== Senate ===
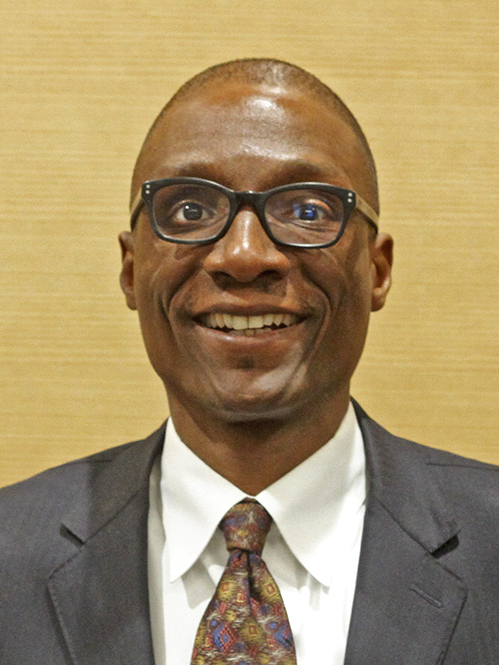
Senate President Bobby Joe Champion (DFL)

- President: Bobby Joe Champion (DFL)
- President pro tempore: Ann Rest (DFL)

==== Majority (DFL) leadership ====
- Majority Leader (since February 6, 2024): Erin Murphy (DFL)
- Majority Leader (until February 6, 2024): Kari Dziedzic (DFL)
- Assistant Majority Leaders
  - Liz Boldon
  - Nick A. Frentz
  - Mary K. Kunesh
  - Foung Hawj
  - Kelly L. Morrison
  - Erin P. Murphy (until February 6, 2024)

==== Minority (Republican) leadership ====
- Minority Leader: Mark T. Johnson (R)
- Assistant Minority Leaders
  - Julia E. Coleman
  - Zach Duckworth
  - Justin D. Eichorn
  - Karin Housley
  - John Jasinski
  - Bill Weber

=== House of Representatives ===
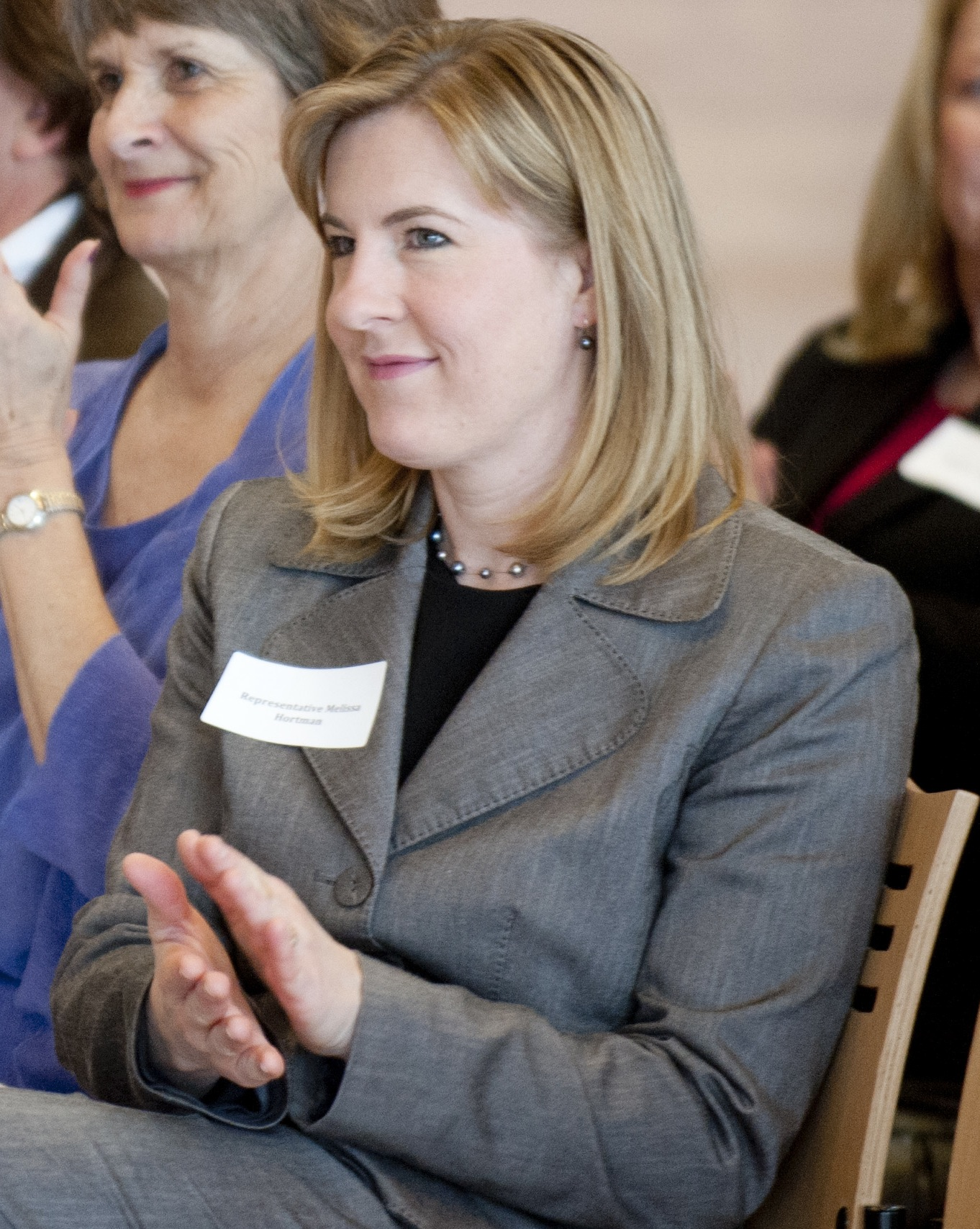
House Speaker Melissa Hortman (DFL)

- Speaker: Melissa Hortman (DFL)
- Speaker pro tempore: Dan Wolgamott (DFL)

==== Majority (DFL) leadership ====
- Majority Leader: Jamie Long (DFL)
- Majority Whip: Athena Hollins
- Assistant Majority Leaders
  - Esther Agbaje
  - Kaela Berg
  - Luke Frederick
  - Sydney Jordan
  - Liz Lee
  - Brad Tabke

==== Minority (Republican) leadership ====
- Minority Leader: Lisa Demuth (R)
- Deputy Minority Leader: Paul Torkelson
- Minority Whip: Jim Nash
- Assistant Minority Leaders
  - Dave Baker
  - Elliott Engen
  - Spencer Igo
  - Bjorn Olson
  - Kristin Robbins
  - Isaac Schultz
  - Peggy Scott
  - Nolan West

== Demographics ==
At the start of the 93rd legislature, 35 of the 203 members (17.2%) identified as a member of an ethnic or racial minority. This included 13 members identifying as African American (5 of whom further identified as Somali), 9 members as Hmong, 4 members as Native American Indian, 4 members as Hispanic and Latino (1 of whom further identified as Puerto Rican), and 1 member as Japanese. 3 members reported multiracial identities: Lisa Demuth (R) was born to a White mother and African American father; Aisha Gomez (DFL) describes herself as "a mixed-heritage Latina, Arab and Jewish woman", and Alicia Kozlowski (DFL) was raised by their Ojibwe mother and Mexican father.

Of the 78 members who reported a religious affiliation, 47 are Protestants (including 20 Lutherans), 22 are Catholic, 7 are Jewish, and 2 are Muslim.

== Members ==
Senate districts by party Republican DFL

=== Senate ===
District	Name	Party	Residence	First elected
1	Mark Johnson	Republican	East Grand Forks	2016
2	Steve Green	Republican	Fosston	2022
3	Grant Hauschild	DFL	Hermantown	2022
4	Rob Kupec	DFL	Moorhead	2022
5	Paul Utke	Republican	Park Rapids	2016
6	Justin Eichorn	Republican	Grand Rapids	2016
7	Robert Farnsworth	Republican	Hibbing	2022
8	Jen McEwen	DFL	Duluth	2020
9	Jordan Rasmusson	Republican	Fergus Falls	2022
10	Nathan Wesenberg	Republican	Little Falls	2022
11	Jason Rarick	Republican	Pine City	2019 (Note: Elected in a special election.)
12	Torrey Westrom	Republican	Alexandria	2012
13	Jeff Howe	Republican	Rockville	2018
14	Aric Putnam	DFL	St. Cloud	2020
15	Gary Dahms	Republican	Redwood Falls	2010
16	Andrew Lang	Republican	Olivia	2016
17	Glenn Gruenhagen	Republican	Glencoe	2022
18	Nick Frentz	DFL	North Mankato	2016
19	John Jasinski	Republican	Faribault	2016
20	Steve Drazkowski	Republican	Mazeppa	2022
21	Bill Weber	Republican	Luverne	2012
22	Rich Draheim	Republican	Madison Lake	2016
23	Gene Dornink	Republican	Hayfield	2020
24	Carla Nelson	Republican	Rochester	2010
25	Liz Boldon	DFL	Rochester	2022
26	Jeremy Miller	Republican	Winona	2010
27	Andrew Mathews	Republican	Milaca	2016
28	Mark Koran	Republican	North Branch	2016
29	Bruce Anderson	Republican	Buffalo Township	2012
30	Eric Lucero	Republican	Saint Michael	2022
31	Cal Bahr	Republican	East Bethel	2022
32	Michael Kreun	Republican	Blaine	2022
33	Karin Housley	Republican	Stillwater	2012
34	John Hoffman	DFL	Champlin	2012
35	Jim Abeler	Republican	Anoka	2016
36	Heather Gustafson	DFL	Vadnais Heights	2022
37	Warren Limmer	Republican	Maple Grove	1995
38	Susan Pha	DFL	Brooklyn Park	2022
39	Mary Kunesh-Podein	DFL	New Brighton	2020
40	John Marty	DFL	Roseville	1986
41	Judy Seeberger	DFL	Afton	2022
42	Bonnie Westlin	DFL	Plymouth	2022
43	Ann Rest	DFL	New Hope	2000
44	Tou Xiong	DFL	Maplewood	2022
45	Kelly Morrison (until Jun. 6, 2024)	DFL	Deephaven	2022
46	Ron Latz	DFL	St. Louis Park	2006
47	Nicole Mitchell	DFL	Woodbury	2022
48	Julia Coleman	Republican	Chanhassen	2020
49	Steve Cwodzinski	DFL	Eden Prairie	2016
50	Alice Mann	DFL	Edina	2022
51	Melissa Halvorson Wiklund	DFL	Bloomington	2012
52	Jim Carlson	DFL	Eagan	2006 (Note: Lost re-election 2010. Elected again in 2012.)
53	Matt Klein	DFL	Mendota Heights	2016
54	Eric Pratt	Republican	Prior Lake	2012
55	Lindsey Port	DFL	Burnsville	2020
56	Erin Maye Quade	DFL	Apple Valley	2022
57	Zach Duckworth	Republican	Lakeville	2020
58	Bill Lieske	Republican	Lonsdale	2022
59	Bobby Joe Champion	DFL	Minneapolis	2012
60	Kari Dziedzic	DFL	Minneapolis	2012
61	Scott Dibble	DFL	Minneapolis	2002
62	Omar Fateh	DFL	Minneapolis	2020
63	Zaynab Mohamed	DFL	Minneapolis	2022
64	Erin Murphy	DFL	Saint Paul	2020
65	Sandy Pappas	DFL	Saint Paul	1990
66	Clare Oumou Verbeten	DFL	Saint Paul	2022
67	Foung Hawj	DFL	Saint Paul	2012

=== House of Representatives ===
House districts by party DFL Republican

District		Name	Party	Residence	First elected
1	A	John Burkel	Republican	Badger	2020
1	B	Deb Kiel	Republican	Crookston	2010
2	A	Matt Grossell	Republican	Clearbrook	2016
2	B	Matt Bliss	Republican	Pennington	2016
3	A	Roger Skraba	Republican	Ely	2022
3	B	Natalie Zeleznikar	Republican	Fredenberg Township	2022
4	A	Heather Keeler	DFL	Moorhead	2020
4	B	Jim Joy	Republican	Hawley	2022
5	A	Krista Knudsen	Republican	Lake Shore	2022
5	B	Mike Wiener	Republican	Long Prairie	2022
6	A	Ben Davis	Republican	Merrifield	2022
6	B	Josh Heintzeman	Republican	Nisswa	2014
7	A	Spencer Igo	Republican	Grand Rapids	2020
7	B	Dave Lislegard	DFL	Aurora	2018
8	A	Liz Olson (until Jul. 5, 2024)	DFL	Duluth	2016
8	B	Alicia Kozlowski	DFL	Duluth	2022
9	A	Jeff Backer	Republican	Browns Valley	2014
9	B	Tom Murphy	Republican	Underwood	2022
10	A	Ron Kresha	Republican	Little Falls	2012
10	B	Isaac Schultz	Republican	Elmdale Township	2022
11	A	Jeff Dotseth	Republican	Kettle River	2022
11	B	Nathan Nelson	Republican	Hinckley	2019 (Note: Elected in a special election.)
12	A	Paul Anderson	Republican	Starbuck	2008
12	B	Mary Franson	Republican	Alexandria	2010
13	A	Lisa Demuth	Republican	Cold Spring	2018
13	B	Tim O'Driscoll	Republican	Sartell	2010
14	A	Bernie Perryman	Republican	St. Augusta	2022
14	B	Dan Wolgamott	DFL	St. Cloud	2018
15	A	Chris Swedzinski	Republican	Ghent	2010
15	B	Paul Torkelson	Republican	Hanska	2008
16	A	Dean Urdahl	Republican	Grove City	2002
16	B	Dave Baker	Republican	Willmar	2014
17	A	Dawn Gillman	Republican	Dassel	2022
17	B	Bobbie Harder	Republican	Henderson	2022
18	A	Jeff Brand	DFL	St. Peter	2018
18	B	Luke Frederick	DFL	Mankato	2020
19	A	Brian Daniels	Republican	Faribault	2014
19	B	John Petersburg	Republican	Waseca	2012
20	A	Pam Altendorf	Republican	Red Wing	2022
20	B	Steven Jacob	Republican	Altura	2022
21	A	Joe Schomacker	Republican	Luverne	2010
21	B	Marj Fogelman	Republican	Fulda	2022
22	A	Bjorn Olson	Republican	Elmore	2020
22	B	Brian Pfarr	Republican	Le Sueur	2020
23	A	Peggy Bennett	Republican	Albert Lea	2014
23	B	Patricia Mueller	Republican	Austin	2020
24	A	Duane Quam	Republican	Byron	2010
24	B	Tina Liebling	DFL	Rochester	2004
25	A	Kim Hicks	DFL	Rochester	2022
25	B	Andy Smith	DFL	Rochester	2022
26	A	Gene Pelowski	DFL	Winona	1986
26	B	Greg Davids	Republican	Preston	1991 (Note: Elected in a special election. Lost re-election in 2006. Elected again in 2008.)
27	A	Shane Mekeland	Republican	Clear Lake	2018
27	B	Kurt Daudt (until Feb. 11, 2024)	Republican	Crown	2010
27	B	Bryan Lawrence (from Apr. 2, 2024)	Republican	Princeton	2024
28	A	Brian Johnson	Republican	Castle Rock	2012
28	B	Anne Neu	Republican	North Branch	2017
29	A	Joe McDonald	Republican	Delano	2010
29	B	Marion O'Neill	Republican	Maple Lake	2012
30	A	Walter Hudson	Republican	Albertville	2022
30	B	Paul Novotny	Republican	Elk River	2020
31	A	Harry Niska	Republican	Ramsey	2022
31	B	Peggy Scott	Republican	Andover	2008
32	A	Nolan West	Republican	Blaine	2016
32	B	Matt Norris	DFL	Blaine	2022
33	A	Patti Anderson	Republican	Dellwood	2022
33	B	Josiah Hill	DFL	Stillwater	2022
34	A	Danny Nadeau	Republican	Rogers	2022
34	B	Melissa Hortman	DFL	Brooklyn Park	2004
35	A	Zack Stephenson	DFL	Coon Rapids	2018
35	B	Jerry Newton	DFL	Coon Rapids	2009
36	A	Elliott Engen	Republican	White Bear Township	2022
36	B	Brion Curran	DFL	Vadnais Heights	2022
37	A	Kristin Robbins	Republican	Maple Grove	2018
37	B	Kristin Bahner	DFL	Maple Grove	2018
38	A	Mike Nelson	DFL	Brooklyn Park	2002
38	B	Samantha Vang	DFL	Brooklyn Center	2018
39	A	Erin Koegel	DFL	Spring Lake Park	2016
39	B	Sandra Feist	DFL	New Brighton	2020
40	A	Kelly Moller	DFL	Shoreview	2018
40	B	Jamie Becker-Finn	DFL	Roseville	2016
41	A	Mark Wiens	Republican	Lake Elmo	2022
41	B	Shane Hudella	Republican	Hastings	2022
42	A	Ned Carroll	DFL	Plymouth	2022
42	B	Ginny Klevorn	DFL	Plymouth	2018
43	A	Cedrick Frazier	DFL	New Hope	2020
43	B	Mike Freiberg	DFL	Golden Valley	2012
44	A	Peter Fischer	DFL	Maplewood	2012
44	B	Leon Lillie	DFL	North St. Paul	2004
45	A	Andrew Myers	Republican	Minnetonka Beach	2022
45	B	Patty Acomb	DFL	Minnetonka	2018
46	A	Larry Kraft	DFL	St. Louis Park	2022
46	B	Cheryl Youakim	DFL	Hopkins	2014
47	A	Amanda Hemmingsen-Jaeger	DFL	Woodbury	2022
47	B	Ethan Cha	DFL	Woodbury	2022
48	A	Jim Nash	Republican	Waconia	2014
48	B	Lucy Rehm	DFL	Chanhassen	2022
49	A	Laurie Pryor	DFL	Minnetonka	2016
49	B	Carlie Kotyza-Witthuhn	DFL	Eden Prairie	2018
50	A	Heather Edelson (until May 28, 2024)	DFL	Edina	2018
50	B	Steve Elkins	DFL	Bloomington	2018
51	A	Michael Howard	DFL	Richfield	2018
51	B	Nathan Coulter	DFL	Bloomington	2022
52	A	Liz Reyer	DFL	Eagan	2020
52	B	Ruth Richardson (until Sep. 1, 2023)	DFL	Mendota Heights	2018
52	B	Bianca Virnig (from Jan. 12, 2024)	DFL	Egan	2023
53	A	Mary Frances Clardy	DFL	Inver Grove Heights	2022
53	B	Rick Hansen	DFL	South St. Paul	2004
54	A	Brad Tabke	DFL	Shakopee	2018
54	B	Ben Bakeberg	Republican	Jordan	2022
55	A	Jessica Hanson	DFL	Burnsville	2020
55	B	Kaela Berg	DFL	Burnsville	2020
56	A	Robert Bierman	DFL	Apple Valley	2018
56	B	John Huot	DFL	Rosemount	2018
57	A	Jon Koznick	Republican	Lakeville	2014
57	B	Jeff Witte	Republican	Lakeville	2022
58	A	Kristi Pursell	DFL	Northfield	2022
58	B	Pat Garofalo	Republican	Farmington	2004
59	A	Fue Lee	DFL	Minneapolis	2016
59	B	Esther Agbaje	DFL	Minneapolis	2020
60	A	Sydney Jordan	DFL	Minneapolis	2020
60	B	Mohamud Noor	DFL	Minneapolis	2018
61	A	Frank Hornstein	DFL	Minneapolis	2002
61	B	Jamie Long	DFL	Minneapolis	2018
62	A	Hodan Hassan	DFL	Minneapolis	2018
62	B	Aisha Gomez	DFL	Minneapolis	2018
63	A	Samantha Sencer-Mura	DFL	Minneapolis	2022
63	B	Emma Greenman	DFL	Minneapolis	2020
64	A	Kaohly Her	DFL	Saint Paul	2018
64	B	Dave Pinto	DFL	Saint Paul	2014
65	A	Samakab Hussein	DFL	Saint Paul	2022
65	B	María Isa Pérez-Vega	DFL	Saint Paul	2022
66	A	Leigh Finke	DFL	Saint Paul	2022
66	B	Athena Hollins	DFL	Saint Paul	2020
67	A	Liz Lee	DFL	Saint Paul	2022
67	B	Jay Xiong	DFL	Saint Paul	2018

== Changes in membership ==
=== House of Representatives ===
District	Vacated by	Description	Successor	Date seated
52B	Ruth Richardson (DFL)	Resigned on September 1, 2023 to focus on role at Planned Parenthood. A special election was held on December 5, 2023.	Bianca Virnig (DFL)	January 12, 2024
27B	Kurt Daudt (R)	Resigned February 11, 2024. A special election was held on March 19, 2024.	Bryan Lawrence (R)	April 2, 2024
50A	Heather Edelson (DFL)	Resigned on May 28, 2024 upon her election to the Hennepin County Board of Commissioners. The seat was vacant through the end of session. The general election was held on November 5, 2024 for the 94th legislature.	Julie Greene (DFL)	—N/a

=== Senate ===
District	Vacated by	Description	Successor	Date seated
45	Kelly Morrison (DFL)	Resigned on June 6, 2024 citing her full-time campaign for Minnesota's 3rd congressional district. The seat was vacant through the end of session. A special election was held on November 5, 2024.	Ann Johnson Stewart (DFL)	—N/a

== Committees ==
=== Senate ===
Committee	Chair(s)	Vice Chair	Republican Lead
Agriculture, Broadband, and Rural Development	Aric Putnam	Rob Kupec	Torrey Westrom
Capital Investment	Sandy Pappas	Susan Pha	Karin Housley
Commerce and Consumer Protection	Matt Klein	Judy Seeberger	Gary Dahms
Education Finance	Mary Kunesh	Heather Gustafson	Jason Rarick
Education Policy	Steve Cwodzinski	Erin Maye Quade	Julia Coleman
Elections	Jim Carlson	Bonnie Westlin	Mark Koran
Energy, Utilities, Environment, and Climate	Nick Frentz	Tou Xiong	Andrew Matthews
Finance	John Marty	Nick Frentz	Eric Pratt
Health and Human Services	Melissa Wiklund	Alice Mann	Paul Utke
Higher Education	Omar Fateh	Aric Putnam	Zach Duckworth
Housing and Homelessness Prevention	Lindsey Port	Liz Boldon	Eric Lucero
Human Services	John Hoffman	Omar Fateh	Jim Abeler
Jobs and Economic Development	Bobby Joe Champion	Zaynab Mohamed	Rich Draheim
Judiciary and Public Safety	Ron Latz	Clare Oumou Verbeten	Warren Limmer
Labor	Jen McEwen	Grant Hauschild	Gene Dornink
Rules and Administration	Kari Dziedzic	Ann Rest	Mark Johnson
State and Local Government and Veterans	Erin Murphy	Nicole Mitchell	Bruce Anderson
Taxes	Ann Rest	Matt Klein	Bill Weber
Transportation	Scott Dibble	Kelly Morrison	John Jasinski

=== House of Representatives ===
Committee	Chair(s)	Vice Chair	Republican Lead
Agriculture Finance and Policy	Samantha Vang	Kristi Pursell	Paul Anderson
Capital Investment	Fue Lee	Liz Reyer	Dean Urdahl
Children and Families Finance and Policy	Dave Pinto	Heather Keeler	Brian Daniels
Climate and Energy Finance and Policy	Patty Acomb	Larry Kraft	Chris Swedzinski
Commerce Finance and Policy	Zack Stephenson	Carlie Kotyza-Witthuhn	Tim O'Driscoll
Economic Development Finance and Policy	Hodan Hassan	Jessica Hanson	Jon Koznick
Education Finance	Cheryl Youakim	Mary Frances Clardy	Ron Kresha
Education Policy	Laurie Pryor	Josiah Hill	Peggy Bennett
Elections Finance and Policy	Mike Freiberg	Emma Greenman	Paul Torkelson
Environment and Natural Resources Policy	Rick Hansen	Sydney Jordan	Josh Heintzeman
Ethics	Kelly Moller		Paul Torkelson
Health Finance and Policy	Tina Liebling	Robert Bierman	Joe Schomacker
Higher Education Finance and Policy	Gene Pelowski	Dan Wolgamott	Marion O'Neill
Housing Finance and Policy	Michael Howard	Esther Agbaje	Brian Johnson
Human Services Finance	Mohamud Noor	Kristin Bahner	Anne Neu Brindley
Human Services Policy	Peter Fischer	Luke Frederick	Deb Kiel
Judiciary Finance and Civil Law	Jamie Becker-Finn	Cedrick Frazier	Peggy Scott
Labor and Industry Finance and Policy	Michael Nelson	Kaela Berg	Joe McDonald
Legacy Finance	Leon Lillie	Samakab Hussein	Jeff Backer
Public Safety Finance and Policy	Kelly Moller	Sandra Feist	Paul Novotny
Rules and Legislative Administration	Jamie Long	Athena Hollins	Lisa Demuth
State and Local Government Finance and Policy	Ginny Klevorn	John Huot	Jim Nash
Sustainable Infrastructure Policy	Erin Koegel	Brion Curran	Mary Franson
Taxes	Aisha Gomez	Matt Norris	Greg Davids
Property Tax Division	Dave Lislegard	Liz Lee	Duane Quam
Transportation Finance and Policy	Frank Hornstein	Brad Tabke	John Petersburg
Veterans and Military Affairs Finance and Policy	Jerry Newton	Steve Elkins	Matt Bliss
Ways and Means	Liz Olson	Heather Edelson	Pat Garofalo
Workforce Development and Policy	Jay Xiong	Jeff Brand	Dave Baker

== See also ==
- List of Minnesota state legislatures
