= Minnesota's 67th Senate district =

American legislative district

Minnesota's 67th State Senate district
Senator
Foung Hawj; DFL–Saint Paul
since January 8, 2013
- Demographics: 44.4% White; 22.1% Black; 11.1% Hispanic; 33.7% Asian; 2.1% Native American; 0.1% Hawaiian/Pacific Islander; 4.6% Other
- Population (2020) • Voting age: 88,060; 52,435

Minnesota Senate, District 67, encompasses portions of Ramsey County. It has formerly included Kittson, Marshall, Roseau, Pennington, and Dakota counties. The district is currently served by Democratic-Farmer-Labor Senator Foung Hawj.

== List of senators ==
Session	Senator	Party	Term start	Term end	Home	Counties represented
39th	Nels S. Hegnes	Nonpartisan Election	January 5, 1915	January 1, 1923	Argyle	Kittson; Marshall; Roseau
40th	Nels S. Hegnes	Nonpartisan Election	January 5, 1915	January 1, 1923	Argyle	Kittson; Marshall; Roseau
41st	Nels S. Hegnes	Nonpartisan Election	January 5, 1915	January 1, 1923	Argyle	Kittson; Marshall; Roseau
42nd	Nels S. Hegnes	Nonpartisan Election	January 5, 1915	January 1, 1923	Argyle	Kittson; Marshall; Roseau
43rd	A.M. Landby	Nonpartisan Election-Liberal Caucus	January 2, 1923	January 5, 1931	Swift	Kittson; Marshall; Roseau
44th	A.M. Landby	Nonpartisan Election-Liberal Caucus	January 2, 1923	January 5, 1931	Swift	Kittson; Marshall; Roseau
45th	A.M. Landby	Nonpartisan Election-Liberal Caucus	January 2, 1923	January 5, 1931	Swift	Kittson; Marshall; Roseau
46th	A.M. Landby	Nonpartisan Election-Liberal Caucus	January 2, 1923	January 5, 1931	Swift	Kittson; Marshall; Roseau
47th	William L. Petersen	Nonpartisan Election	January 6, 1931	January 7, 1935	Lancaster	Kittson; Marshall; Roseau
48th	William L. Petersen	Nonpartisan Election	January 6, 1931	January 7, 1935	Lancaster	Kittson; Marshall; Roseau
49th	Richard Rice	Nonpartisan Election	January 8, 1935	January 2, 1939	Alvarado	Kittson; Marshall; Roseau
50th	Richard Rice	Nonpartisan Election	January 8, 1935	January 2, 1939	Alvarado	Kittson; Marshall; Roseau
51st	Eric Friberg	Nonpartisan Election	January 3, 1939	January 6, 1947	Roseau	Kittson; Marshall; Roseau
52nd	Eric Friberg	Nonpartisan Election	January 3, 1939	January 6, 1947	Roseau	Kittson; Marshall; Roseau
53rd	Eric Friberg	Nonpartisan Election	January 3, 1939	January 6, 1947	Roseau	Kittson; Marshall; Roseau
54th	Eric Friberg	Nonpartisan Election	January 3, 1939	January 6, 1947	Roseau	Kittson; Marshall; Roseau
55th	Donald Sinclair	Nonpartisan Election - Conservative Caucus	January 7, 1947	January 1, 1973	Stephen	Kittson; Marshall; Roseau
56th	Donald Sinclair	Nonpartisan Election - Conservative Caucus	January 7, 1947	January 1, 1973	Stephen	Kittson; Marshall; Roseau
57th	Donald Sinclair	Nonpartisan Election - Conservative Caucus	January 7, 1947	January 1, 1973	Stephen	Kittson; Marshall; Roseau
58th	Donald Sinclair	Nonpartisan Election - Conservative Caucus	January 7, 1947	January 1, 1973	Stephen	Kittson; Marshall; Roseau
59th	Donald Sinclair	Nonpartisan Election - Conservative Caucus	January 7, 1947	January 1, 1973	Stephen	Kittson; Marshall; Roseau
60th	Donald Sinclair	Nonpartisan Election - Conservative Caucus	January 7, 1947	January 1, 1973	Stephen	Kittson; Marshall; Roseau
61st	Donald Sinclair	Nonpartisan Election - Conservative Caucus	January 7, 1947	January 1, 1973	Stephen	Kittson; Marshall; Roseau
62nd	Donald Sinclair	Nonpartisan Election - Conservative Caucus	January 7, 1947	January 1, 1973	Stephen	Kittson; Marshall; Roseau
63rd	Donald Sinclair	Nonpartisan Election - Conservative Caucus	January 7, 1947	January 1, 1973	Stephen	Kittson; Marshall; Roseau
64th	Donald Sinclair	Nonpartisan Election - Conservative Caucus	January 7, 1947	January 1, 1973	Stephen	Kittson; Marshall; Roseau
65th	Donald Sinclair	Nonpartisan Election - Conservative Caucus	January 7, 1947	January 1, 1973	Stephen	Kittson; Marshall; Pennington; Roseau
66th	Donald Sinclair	Nonpartisan Election - Conservative Caucus	January 7, 1947	January 1, 1973	Stephen	Kittson; Marshall; Pennington; Roseau
67th	Donald Sinclair	Nonpartisan Election - Conservative Caucus	January 7, 1947	January 1, 1973	Stephen	Kittson; Marshall; Pennington; Roseau
68th	William McCutcheon	Nonpartisan Election - Conservative Caucus	January 2, 1973	May 1, 1980	Saint Paul	Dakota; Ramsey
69th	William McCutcheon	Nonpartisan Election - Democratic-Farmer-Labor Caucus	January 2, 1973	May 1, 1980	Saint Paul	Dakota; Ramsey
70th	William McCutcheon	Democratic-Farmer-Labor	January 2, 1973	May 1, 1980	Saint Paul	Dakota; Ramsey
71st	William McCutcheon	Democratic-Farmer-Labor	January 2, 1973	May 1, 1980	Saint Paul	Dakota; Ramsey
72nd	Marilyn Lantry	Democratic-Farmer-Labor	January 6, 1981	January 7, 1991	Saint Paul	Dakota; Ramsey
73rd	Marilyn Lantry	Democratic-Farmer-Labor	January 6, 1981	January 7, 1991	Saint Paul	Dakota; Ramsey
74th	Marilyn Lantry	Democratic-Farmer-Labor	January 6, 1981	January 7, 1991	Saint Paul	Dakota; Ramsey
75th	Marilyn Lantry	Democratic-Farmer-Labor	January 6, 1981	January 7, 1991	Saint Paul	Dakota; Ramsey
76th	Marilyn Lantry	Democratic-Farmer-Labor	January 6, 1981	January 7, 1991	Saint Paul	Dakota; Ramsey
77th	Randy Cameron Kelly	Democratic-Farmer-Labor	January 8, 1991	January 2, 2002	Saint Paul	Ramsey
78th	Randy Cameron Kelly	Democratic-Farmer-Labor	January 8, 1991	January 2, 2002	Saint Paul	Ramsey
79th	Randy Cameron Kelly	Democratic-Farmer-Labor	January 8, 1991	January 2, 2002	Saint Paul	Ramsey
80th	Randy Cameron Kelly	Democratic-Farmer-Labor	January 8, 1991	January 2, 2002	Saint Paul	Ramsey
81st	Randy Cameron Kelly	Democratic-Farmer-Labor	January 8, 1991	January 2, 2002	Saint Paul	Ramsey
82nd	Randy Cameron Kelly	Democratic-Farmer-Labor	January 8, 1991	January 2, 2002	Saint Paul	Ramsey
83rd	Mee Moua	Democratic-Farmer-Labor	February 4, 2002	January 3, 2011	Saint Paul	Ramsey
84th	Mee Moua	Democratic-Farmer-Labor	February 4, 2002	January 3, 2011	Saint Paul	Ramsey
85th	Mee Moua	Democratic-Farmer-Labor	February 4, 2002	January 3, 2011	Saint Paul	Ramsey
86th	Mee Moua	Democratic-Farmer-Labor	February 4, 2002	January 3, 2011	Saint Paul	Ramsey
87th	John M. Harrington	Democratic-Farmer-Labor	January 4, 2011	September 3, 2012	Saint Paul	Ramsey
88th	Foung Hawj	Democratic-Farmer-Labor	January 8, 2013	Current	Saint Paul	Ramsey
89th	Foung Hawj	Democratic-Farmer-Labor	January 8, 2013	Current	Saint Paul	Ramsey
90th	Foung Hawj	Democratic-Farmer-Labor	January 8, 2013	Current	Saint Paul	Ramsey
91st	Foung Hawj	Democratic-Farmer-Labor	January 8, 2013	Current	Saint Paul	Ramsey
92nd	Foung Hawj	Democratic-Farmer-Labor	January 8, 2013	Current	Saint Paul	Ramsey
93rd	Foung Hawj	Democratic-Farmer-Labor	January 8, 2013	Current	Saint Paul	Ramsey

== Recent elections ==
=== 2016 ===
The candidate filing deadline was May 31, 2016. The primary election took place on August 9, 2016; both incumbent Foung Hawj and Krysia Weidell ran unopposed. The general election was held on November 8, 2016, resulting in Hwaj's victory.

Minnesota State Senate election, 2008
Party	Candidate	Votes	%
Democratic (DFL)	Foung Hawj	21,696	75.37
Republican	Krysia Weidell	7,091	24.63
Total votes		28,787	100.0
hold			

=== 2012 ===
Elections for the Minnesota State Senate occurred after state-wide redistricting from 2010. The signature-filing deadline for candidates wishing to run in this election was June 5, 2012. Foung Hawj defeated Tom Dimon and Robert Humphrey in the Democratic primary, and defeated Mike Capistrant in the general election.

Minnesota State Senate election, 2008
Party	Candidate	Votes	%
Democratic (DFL)	Foung Hawj	21,630	72.8
Republican	Mike Capistrant	8,094	27.2
Total votes		29,724	100.0
hold			
