= Lindsey Port =

American politician

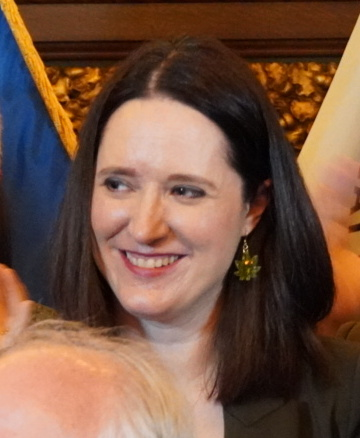
- Port at the signing of HF100 in 2023

Member of the Minnesota Senate from the 55th district 56th district (2021-22)
- Incumbent
- Assumed office January 5, 2021
- Preceded by: Dan Hall

Personal details
- Party: Democratic (DFL)
- Education: University of Minnesota Twin Cities
- Occupation: Non-profit advisor and consultant

Lindsey Port is a Minnesota politician and a member of the Minnesota Senate. A member of the Minnesota Democratic Farmer-Labor Party, she represents Senate District 55, which includes parts of Burnsville, Savage, and Lakeville in Dakota and Scott counties in the southern Twin Cities metropolitan area.

== Early life, education ==
Port grew up in Sioux Falls, South Dakota, with her parents and sister. She moved to Minnesota in 2001 to attend the University of Minnesota – Twin Cities.

== Minnesota Senate ==
In 2016, Port ran for the Minnesota House of Representatives in District 56B and lost to Republican incumbent Roz Peterson. Port was elected to the Minnesota Senate in 2020 with 53% of the vote, defeating Republican incumbent Dan Hall.

Port was the chief Senate author of a 2023 law that legalized the recreational use of cannabis by adults and expunged low-level cannabis convictions. She and Representative Emma Greenman co-authored a bill banning junk fees that was signed into law in May 2024. Port is also the Senate chair of the DFL Reproductive Freedom Caucus, and has been a member of the caucus since its inception in 2021.

Port serves on the following committees:

- Housing and Homelessness Prevention (chair)
- Rules and Administration - Subcommittee on the Federal Impact on Minnesotans and Economic Stability (chair)
- Elections
- Energy, Utilities, Environment and Climate
- Transportation

== Personal life ==
Port lives in Burnsville with her husband and two children and serves as the executive director of a professional development nonprofit group. Since first contracting COVID-19 in 2020, Port has been battling long COVID and intermittently works remotely.
