= Anna Wills =

American politician

Member of the Minnesota House of Representatives from the 57B district
- In office January 8, 2013 – January 7, 2019
- Preceded by: Kurt Bills (District 37B)
- Succeeded by: John Huot

Personal details
- Born: October 13, 1984 (age 41)
- Party: Republican Party of Minnesota
- Spouse: Rob
- Children: 3
- Education: Northwestern College

Anna Wills (born October 13, 1984) is an American politician and former member of the Minnesota House of Representatives. A member of the Republican Party of Minnesota, she represented District 57B in the southern Twin Cities metropolitan area.

== Education and early career ==
Wills attended Northwestern College. She was the legislative assistant for state senator Michelle Benson from 2011 to 2012. Prior to that she worked at McDonald's and Caribou Coffee.

== Minnesota House of Representatives ==
Wills was first elected to the Minnesota House of Representatives in 2012. She was subsequently re-elected in 2014 and 2016, but was defeated by DFL challenger John Huot in 2018.

== Personal life ==
Anna is the first homeschool graduate to be elected to the Minnesota Legislature. Anna first became involved in the political process in her early teens, and has served in many volunteer leadership positions: as a volunteer coordinator, a campaign office manager, and as Burnsville City Chair for a 2008 presidential campaign.

Anna and her husband, Rob, live in Rosemount, Minnesota with their three children. They are active members of Bethlehem Baptist Church.
