= Sheldon Johnson =

American politician

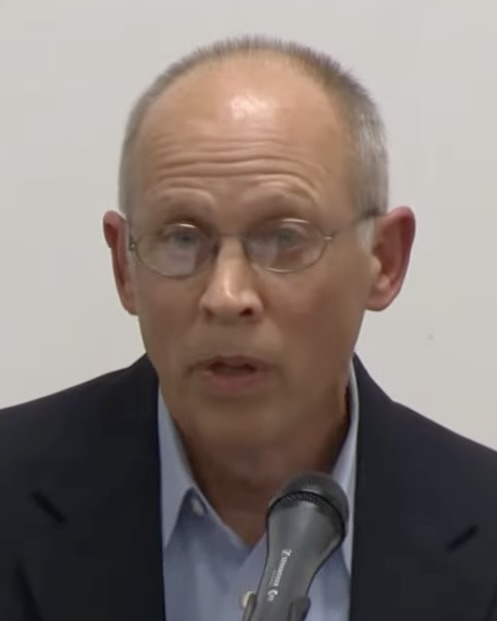

Member of the Minnesota House of Representatives from the 67B district
- In office January 3, 2001 – January 7, 2019
- Preceded by: Steve Trimble
- Succeeded by: Jay Xiong

Personal details
- Born: March 25, 1954 (age 72) Braham, Minnesota, U.S.
- Party: Minnesota Democratic–Farmer–Labor Party
- Children: 2
- Education: Bethel College; University of Saint Thomas
- Occupation: corrections

Sheldon Johnson (born March 25, 1954) is an American politician and former member of the Minnesota House of Representatives. A member of the Minnesota Democratic–Farmer–Labor Party (DFL), he represented District 67B, which included portions of the Dayton's Bluff, Beaver Lake Heights, Highwood Hills, Mounds Park, Conway, Eastview and Battle Creek neighborhoods of Saint Paul in Ramsey County in the Twin Cities metropolitan area.

== Early life and education ==
Johnson was born in Braham, Minnesota. He graduated from Braham High School, then earned a Bachelor of Arts degree in social work from Bethel College and a Master of Arts in psychology from the University of Saint Thomas.

== Minnesota House of Representatives ==
Johnson first ran for state representative in 2000 after incumbent Representative Steve Trimble, also a Democrat, did not seek reelection. He defeated Democrat Aly Xiong in the primary election and Republican Scott Zimmer in the general election. In the 2002 general election, he defeated Republican Ken Lehman, the Green Party's Roger Alton Westall, and the Independence Party's John Klein. In 2004 and 2006 he defeated Republican Gregory W. LeMay, in 2008 he defeated Republican David Carlson, and in 2010 he defeated Republican Cheryl Golden-Black.

Johnson chaired the Commerce and Labor Subcommittee for the Telecommunications Regulation and Infrastructure Division during the 2007–08 and 2009–10 biennia.

== Personal life ==
Johnson is a retired Ramsey County corrections officer. He is Presbyterian, and has two adult daughters.
