= Peggy Scott (politician) =

American politician (born 1961)

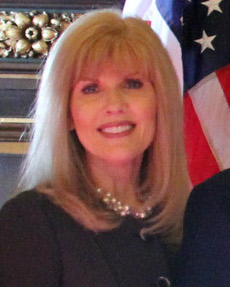
- Scott in 2017

Member of the Minnesota House of Representatives
- Incumbent
- Assumed office January 6, 2009
- Preceded by: Chris DeLaForest
- Constituency: District 31B (2023–present); District 35B (2013–2023); District 49A (2009–2013)

Personal details
- Born: December 1961 (age 64)
- Party: Republican Party of Minnesota
- Spouse: David
- Children: 2
- Education: Lowthian College
- Occupation: Business owner, realtor, legislator

Peggy S. Scott (born December 1961) is an American politician serving in the Minnesota House of Representatives since 2009. A member of the Republican Party of Minnesota, Scott represents District 31B in the northern Twin Cities metropolitan area, which includes the cities of Andover and East Bethel and parts of Anoka and Isanti Counties. She is a small business owner and realtor.

== Early life, education, and career ==
Scott graduated from Lowthian College, now called the Art Institutes International, in Minneapolis, in 1983, majoring in fashion merchandising. In addition to owning and operating a real estate investment company with her husband, she has been active in her community, serving on the Andover Parks and Recreation Commission, and coaching youth soccer and basketball. She is involved with the women's and youth ministry programs at her church and has served as an after-school care coordinator at the congregation's school.

== Minnesota House of Representatives ==
Scott was elected to the Minnesota House of Representatives in 2008 after incumbent Chris DeLaForest opted not to seek reelection, and has been reelected every two years since.

During the 2011-12 legislative session, Scott chaired the Data Practices Subcommittee of the Civil Law Committee. In 2013-14, she served as an assistant minority leader. From 2014 to 2018, Scott chaired the Civil Law and Data Practices Committee. She serves as the minority lead on the Judiciary Finance and Civil Law Committee and again as an assistant minority leader.

== Political positions ==
In December 2021, Scott and 37 other Republicans signed a letter in opposition to the Mayo Clinic for its vaccine mandate policy for employees, calling for a halt in state funding for health care facilities that fire employees "due to unrealistic vaccine mandate policies".

== Electoral history ==
2008 Minnesota State House - District 49A
Party	Candidate	Votes	%
Republican	Peggy Scott	13,934	59.34
Democratic (DFL)	Ted Butler	9,523	40.56
Write-in		23	0.10
Total votes		23,480	100.0
Republican hold			

2010 Minnesota State House - District 49A
Party	Candidate	Votes	%
Republican	Peggy Scott (incumbent)	12,871	69.11
Democratic (DFL)	Dustin Norman	5,741	30.82
Write-in		13	0.07
Total votes		18,625	100.0
Republican hold			

2012 Minnesota State House - District 35B
Party	Candidate	Votes	%
Republican	Peggy Scott (incumbent)	13,120	59.09
Democratic (DFL)	Sam Scott	9,052	40.77
Write-in		30	0.14
Total votes		22,202	100.0
Republican hold			

2014 Minnesota State House - District 35B
Party	Candidate	Votes	%
Republican	Peggy Scott (incumbent)	10,034	65.97
Democratic (DFL)	Sam Beard	5,162	33.94
Write-in		13	0.09
Total votes		15,209	100.0
Republican hold			

2016 Minnesota State House - District 35B
Party	Candidate	Votes	%
Republican	Peggy Scott (incumbent)	14,705	64.74
Democratic (DFL)	Wes Volkenant	7,990	35.17
Write-in		20	0.09
Total votes		22,715	100.0
Republican hold			

2018 Minnesota State House - District 35B
Party	Candidate	Votes	%
Republican	Peggy Scott (incumbent)	11,438	56.53
Democratic (DFL)	Kathryn Eckhardt	8,771	43.35
Write-in		25	0.12
Total votes		20,234	100.0
Republican hold			

2020 Minnesota State House - District 35B
Party	Candidate	Votes	%
Republican	Peggy Scott (incumbent)	15,385	60.17
Democratic (DFL)	Jason Ruffalo	10,170	39.77
Write-in		14	0.05
Total votes		25,569	100.0
Republican hold			

2022 Minnesota State House - District 31B
Party	Candidate	Votes	%
Republican	Peggy Scott (incumbent)	14,161	68.08
Democratic (DFL)	Bill Fisher	6,630	31.87
Write-in		11	0.05
Total votes		20,802	100.0
Republican hold			
