= Jack Considine =

American politician

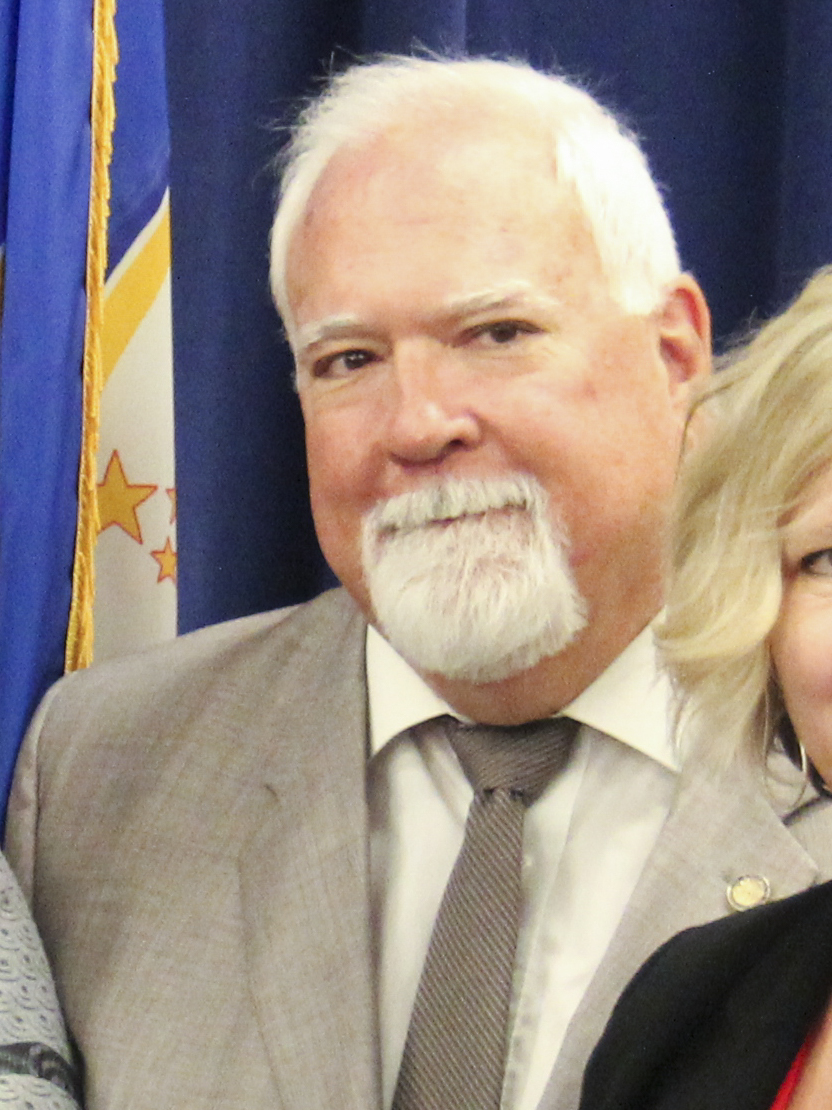

Member of the Minnesota House of Representatives from the 19B district
- In office January 6, 2015 – January 6, 2021
- Preceded by: Kathy Brynaert
- Succeeded by: Luke Frederick

Personal details
- Born: Topeka, Kansas, U.S.
- Party: Democratic
- Spouse: Kristine Madsen
- Children: 2
- Education: University of Georgia (BA)

John "Jack" Considine Jr. is an American politician who served as a member of the Minnesota House of Representatives from 2015 to 2021.

== Early life and education ==
Considine was born on Forbes Air Force Base in Topeka, Kansas. He earned a Bachelor of Arts degree in sociology from the University of Georgia.

== Career ==
Considine was first elected to the Minnesota House of Representatives in 2014. A member of the Minnesota Democratic–Farmer–Labor Party (DFL), he represented District 19B in south-central Minnesota. Considine left office in 2021, succeeded by Luke Frederick.

== Personal life ==
Considine is married to his wife, Kristine Madsen. They have two children and reside in Mankato, Minnesota. He previously served on Mankato's city council.
