= Sarah Anderson (Minnesota politician) =

American politician

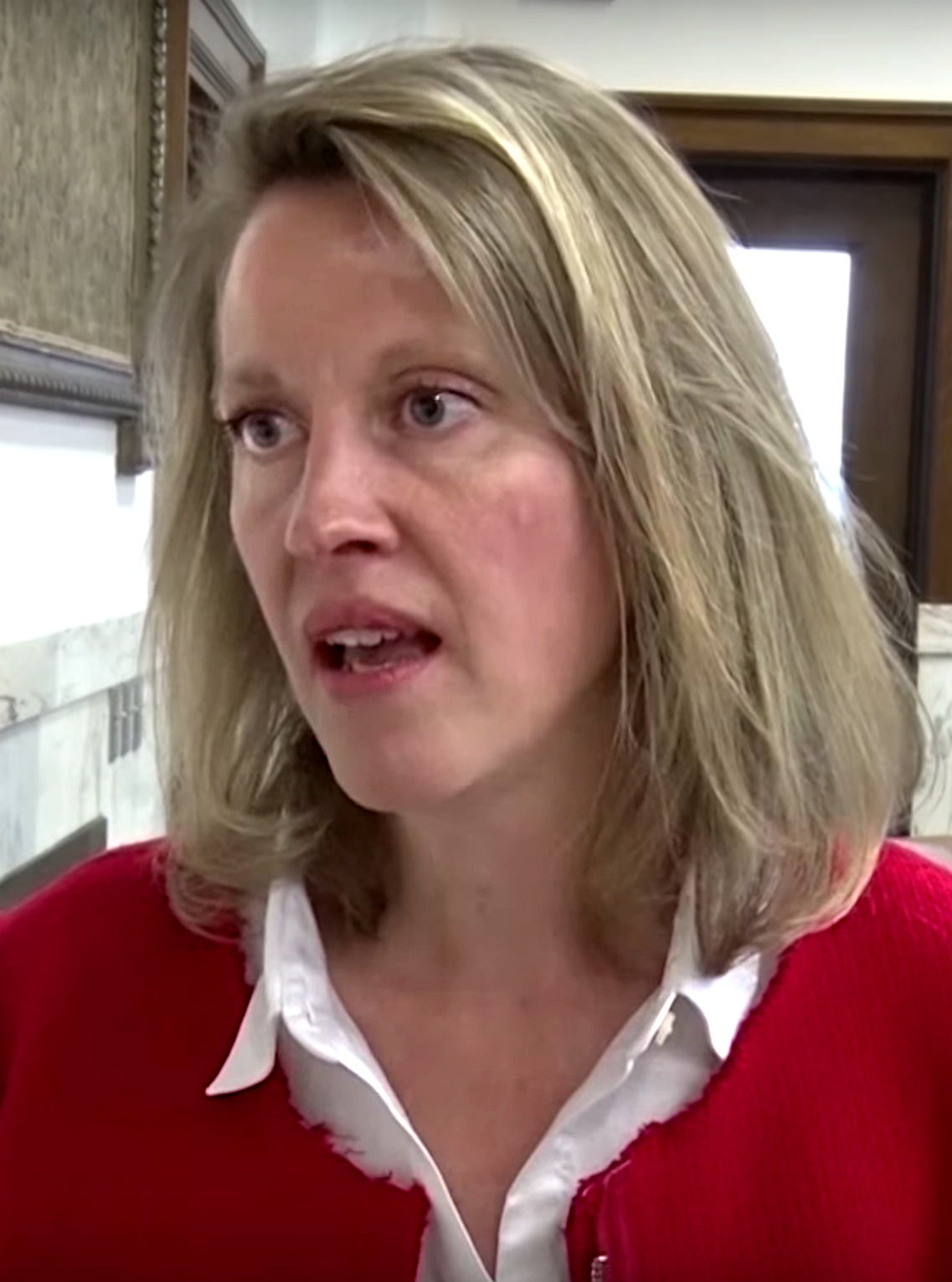

Member of the Minnesota House of Representatives from the 44A district 43A (2007–2013)
- In office January 3, 2007 – January 8, 2019
- Preceded by: Jeff Johnson
- Succeeded by: Ginny Klevorn

Personal details
- Born: September 7, 1972 (age 53)
- Party: Republican
- Spouse: Paul Anderson
- Children: 1
- Education: University of Minnesota Duluth

Sarah L. Anderson (born September 7, 1972) is an American politician and former member of the Minnesota House of Representatives. A member of the Republican Party of Minnesota, she represented District 44A, which included a large section of Plymouth, located in western Hennepin County in the Twin Cities metropolitan area.

== Early life, education, and career ==
The youngest of 13 children, Anderson graduated from Atwater-Grove City High School in Atwater, in 1990 then went on to the University of Minnesota in Duluth, earning her B.A. in Political Science and Sociology in 1994. She worked for the Minnesota House and the Republican Party from 1995–2006, and also served as a one-term planning commissioner (where she was assigned as the park and recreation liaison) for the city of Plymouth. Dates have not been verified.

Anderson is a former manager of the Legislative Assistant Department of the Republican Caucus in the Minnesota House, a former staffer for the House's Capital Investment Committee, and a former legislative assistant to House Speaker Steve Sviggum.

== Minnesota House of Representatives ==
Anderson was first elected in 2006 (53%), succeeding three-term Rep. Jeff Johnson, who ran for Minnesota Attorney General. She was re-elected in 2008 (54%), 2010 (58%), 2012 (51%), 2014 (55%), and 2016 (54%). She was defeated in 2018 by Ginny Klevorn 54% to 46%. During her 2018 campaign, she was assaulted by a man who was vandalizing political yard signs at her home.
