= John Huot =

American politician

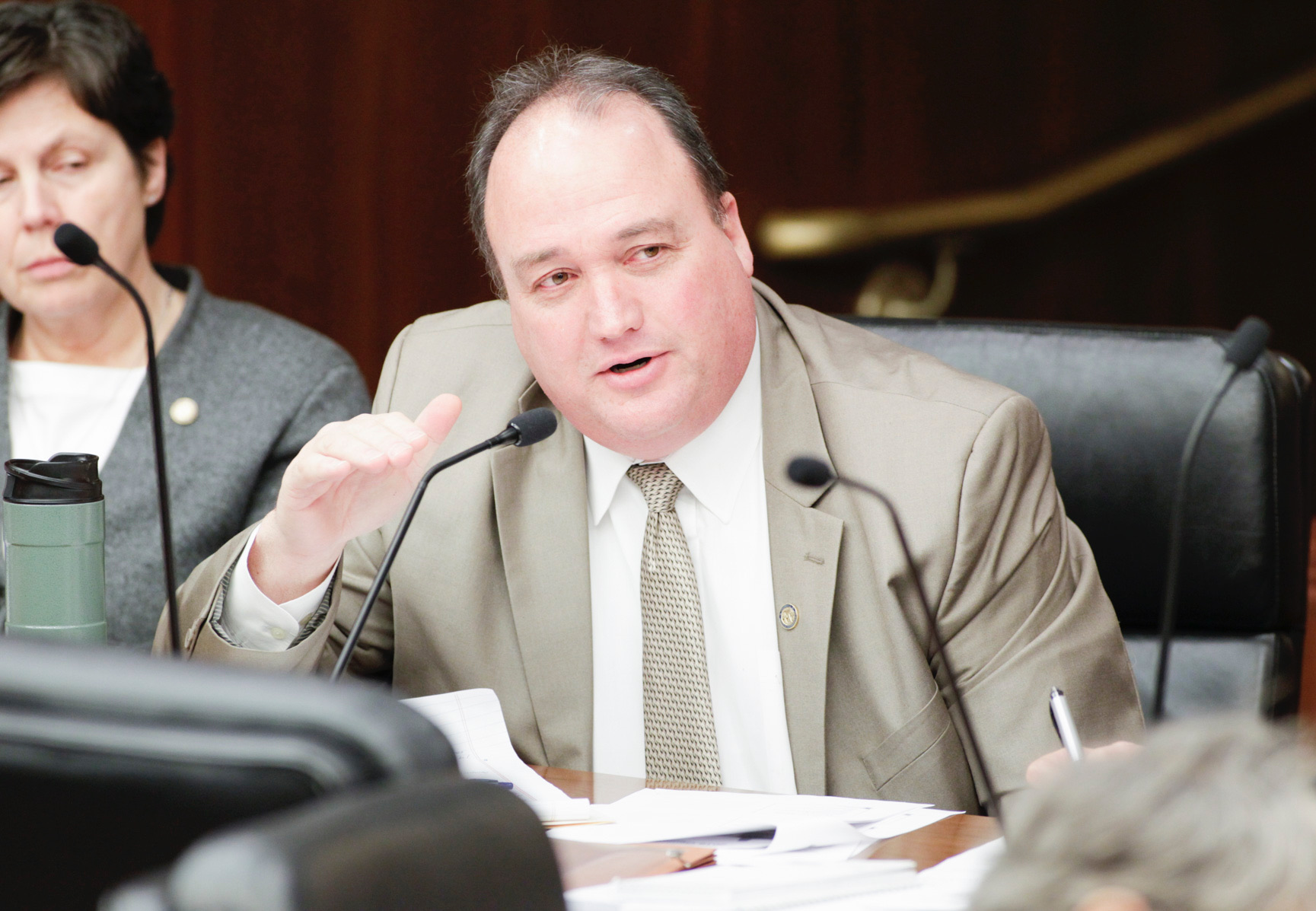

Member of the Minnesota House of Representatives from the 56B district
- Incumbent
- Assumed office January 8, 2019
- Preceded by: Anna Wills

Personal details
- Born: May 23, 1965 (age 61)
- Party: Democratic (DFL)
- Spouse: Angela (m. 1991)
- Children: 3
- Education: Century College, Kaplan University
- Occupation: Realtor; Emergency medical technician; Business consultant
- Website: Government website Campaign website

John Duffy Huot (/ˈhjuː.ɪt/; born May 23, 1965) is an American politician serving in the Minnesota House of Representatives since 2019. A member of the Minnesota Democratic–Farmer–Labor Party (DFL), Huot represents District 56B in the southern Twin Cities metropolitan area, which includes the cities of Apple Valley and Rosemount and parts of Dakota County.

== Early life, education, and career ==
Huot graduated from Hudson High School in Wisconsin and attended trade school in Winona, Minnesota. He received an emergency medical technician certification from Century College and a real estate certification from Kaplan Vocational-Technical School.

== Minnesota House of Representatives ==
Huot was first elected to the Minnesota House of Representatives in 2018 and has been reelected every two years since. Huot first ran in 2016, losing to two-term Republican incumbent Anna Wills. He challenged Wills again in 2018 and won. In 2020, Huot had his election results challenged, however the case was dismissed by a judge for failing to state a claim and a lack of subject-matter jurisdiction.

Huot serves as vice chair of the State and Local Government Finance and Policy Committee and sits on the Property Tax Division of the Taxes Committee and the Public Safety Finance and Policy and Rules and Legislative Administration Committees. From 2021 to 2022, he was vice chair of the Health Finance and Policy Committee

Huot authored legislation to increase funding for the Minnesota Attorney General's office, to hire more prosecutors to work on criminal cases around the state. He was the only DFL legislator to vote against a ban on no-knock warrants during a 2022 Public Safety Committee hearing.

A football and basketball referee, Huot authored legislation that would fine unruly youth sports attendees, protecting coaches players and referees. He sponsored legislation to give the Minnesota Zoo emergency funding during the COVID-19 pandemic.

An EMT, Huot has advocated for better conditions for volunteer EMTs in the face of declining volunteers. He supported legislation eliminating the statute of limitations on reporting sexual assault, speaking out about having been abused by a priest as a child.

== Electoral history ==
2016 Minnesota State House - District 57B
Party	Candidate	Votes	%
Republican	Anna Wills (incumbent)	12,382	53.66
Democratic (DFL)	John Huot	10,656	46.18
Write-in		37	0.16
Total votes		23,075	100.0
Republican hold			

2018 Minnesota State House - District 57B
Party	Candidate	Votes	%
Democratic (DFL)	John Huot	11,209	51.92
Republican	Anna Wills (incumbent)	10,373	48.04
Write-in		9	0.04
Total votes		21,591	100.0
Democratic (DFL) gain from Republican			

2020 Minnesota State House - District 57B
Party	Candidate	Votes	%
Democratic (DFL)	John Huot (incumbent)	14,527	55.02
Republican	Sandra A. Jimenez	11,857	44.91
Write-in		19	0.07
Total votes		26,403	100.0
Democratic (DFL) hold			

2022 Minnesota State House - District 56B
Party	Candidate	Votes	%
Democratic (DFL)	John Huot (incumbent)	11,854	55.57
Republican	Joe Scanlon	9,455	44.33
Write-in		21	0.10
Total votes		21,330	100.0
Democratic (DFL) hold			

2024 Minnesota State House - District 56B
Party	Candidate	Votes	%
Democratic (DFL)	John Huot (incumbent)	14,736	55.97
Republican	Angeline Anderson	11,575	43.96
Write-in		19	0.07
Total votes		26,330	100.00
Democratic (DFL) hold			

== Personal life ==
Huot and his wife, Angela, have three children. He resides in Rosemount, Minnesota. He is a Roman Catholic.
