= Jay Xiong =

American politician

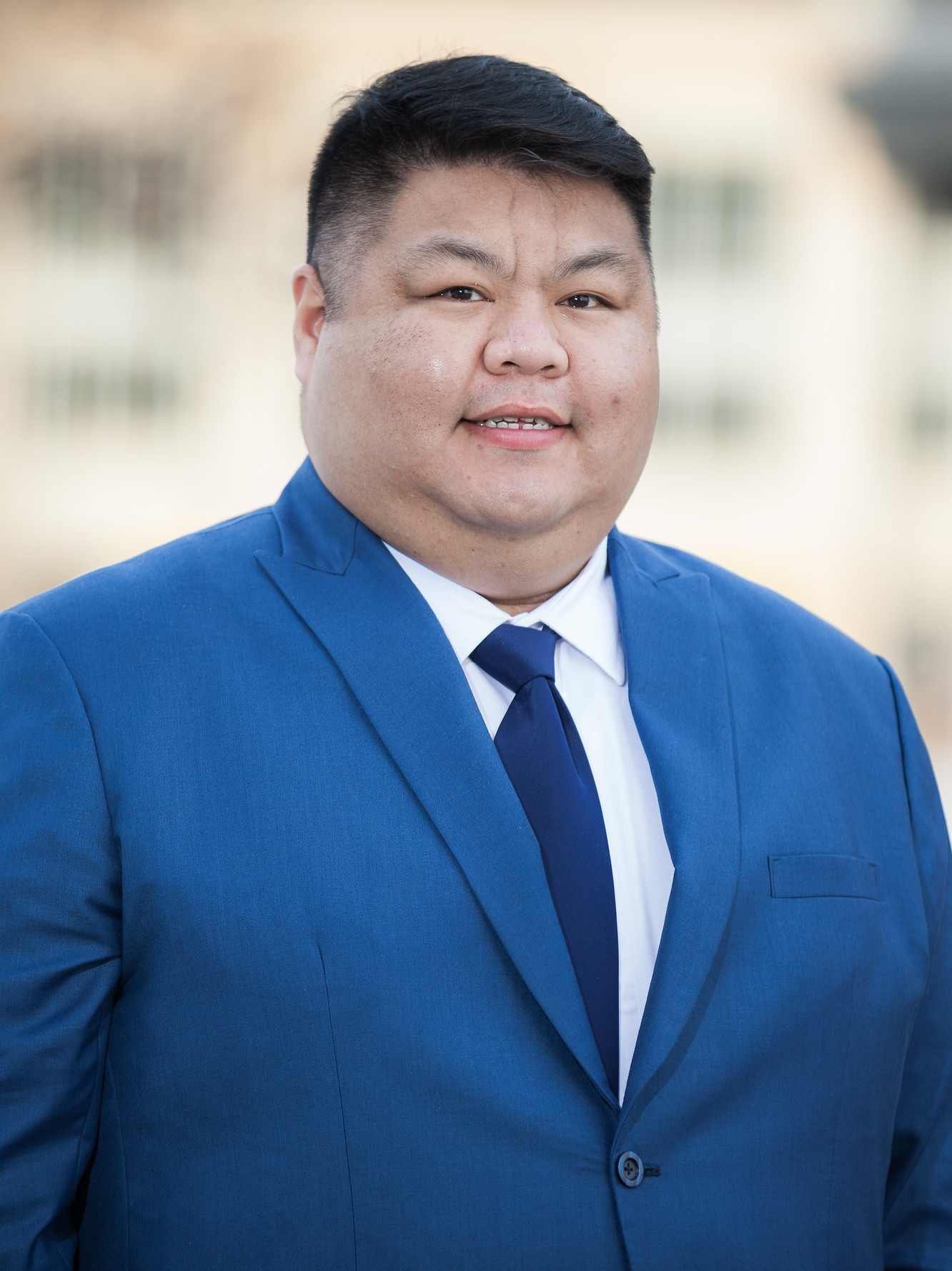

Member of the Minnesota House of Representatives from the 67B district
- Incumbent
- Assumed office January 8, 2019
- Preceded by: Sheldon Johnson

Personal details
- Born: 1982 or 1983 (age 42–43)
- Party: Democratic
- Education: St. Olaf College; Waseda University; Chiang Mai University; East China Normal University
- Occupation: Business Owner

Jay Xiong (born 1983) is an American politician serving in the Minnesota House of Representatives since 2019. A member of the Minnesota Democratic–Farmer–Labor Party (DFL), Xiong represents District 67B, which includes parts of Saint Paul in Ramsey County, Minnesota.

== Early life, education, and career ==
Xiong attended Saint Paul Public Schools and graduated from St. Olaf College.

Xiong is a co-founder of the Asian American Organizing Project (AAOP) and Progressive Hmong American Organizers (PHAO).

== Minnesota House of Representatives ==
Xiong was elected to the Minnesota House of Representatives in 2018, to represent House District 67B, on St. Paul's lower east side. He replaced Sheldon Johnson, who retired after serving 18 years. Xiong received the DFL endorsement after three rounds of balloting, leading by a wide margin each time against Shoua Yang, John Slade, and Grant Stevensen. He is the first person of color to hold the seat in the majority-minority district.

Xiong serves as chair of the Workforce Development Finance and Policy Committee, and sits on the Capital Investment and Economic Development Finance and Policy Committees.

== Electoral history ==
2018 Minnesota State House - District 67B
Party	Candidate	Votes	%
Democratic (DFL)	Jay Xiong	10,235	78.10
Republican	Fred Turk	2,827	21.57
Write-in		43	0.33
Total votes		13,105	100.0
Democratic (DFL) hold			

2020 Minnesota State House - District 67B
Party	Candidate	Votes	%
Democratic (DFL)	Jay Xiong (incumbent)	12,474	75.73
Republican	Fred Turk	3,952	23.99
Write-in		46	0.28
Total votes		16,426	100.0
Democratic (DFL) hold			

2022 Minnesota State House - District 67B
Party	Candidate	Votes	%
Democratic (DFL)	Jay Xiong (incumbent)	7,702	75.17
Republican	Fred Turk	2,527	24.66
Write-in		17	0.17
Total votes		10,229	100.0
Democratic (DFL) hold			

2024 Minnesota State House - District 67B
Party	Candidate	Votes	%
Democratic (DFL)	Jay Xiong (incumbent)	10,610	74.70
Republican	Sharon Anderson	3,538	24.91
Write-in		56	0.39
Total votes		14,204	100.0
Democratic (DFL) hold			

== Personal life ==
Xiong lives with his spouse and children in St. Paul's Battle Creek neighborhood.
