= Art Institutes International Minnesota =

Former for-profit art school as part of The Art Institutes

The Art Institutes International Minnesota
- Motto: The College for Creative Minds
- Type: For-profit school
- Active: 1964–2019
- Affiliations: The Art Institutes
- President: Jennifer Sorenson
- Dean: Dr. Susan Tarnowski
- Students: 850
- Location: Minneapolis, Minnesota, United States
- Campus: Urban
- Colors: Black and Red
- Nickname: Ai Minnesota
- Website: http://www.artinstitutes.edu/minneapolis (offline)

The Art Institutes International Minnesota was a for-profit college in Minneapolis, Minnesota. It was part of The Art Institutes, a system of proprietary colleges focusing on creative industries. The Art Institutes International Minnesota offered certificate, associate, and bachelor's degrees and at one time had an enrollment of over 2,000 students. On June 10, 2016, it was announced that the school would stop enrolling students into its programs effective immediately, closing its doors in July 2019 with the graduation of its final class.

== History ==
Located in downtown Minneapolis, The Art Institutes International Minnesota prepared students for careers in the visual and practical arts. The Art Institutes International Minnesota was founded in 1964 by Petrena Lowthian establishing what was to become Lowthian College.

In 1981, Lowthian College was authorized to award the Associate in Applied Science degree. The Art Institutes acquired the College in early 1997.

Former presidents include:

- 1997 – 2001: Glenn Johannesen
- 2002-2004: Dr. Alan Stutts
- 2004-2006: Larry Horn
- 2006-2008: Joseph Marzano
- 2008-2010: William A. Johnson
- 2010 – 2012: Dr. Jeffrey Allen
