= Dave Baker (Minnesota politician) =

American politician

Member of the Minnesota House of Representatives from the 16B district
- Incumbent
- Assumed office January 6, 2015
- Preceded by: Mary Sawatzky

Personal details
- Born: March 27, 1962 (age 64) Hamel, Minnesota, U.S.
- Party: Republican Party of Minnesota
- Spouse: Mary Paulbeck (m. 1985)
- Children: 3
- Education: St. Cloud Area Vocational Technical Institute
- Occupation: Small business owner; Legislator
- Website: Government website Campaign website

Dave Baker (born March 27, 1962) is an American politician serving as a member of the Minnesota House of Representatives since 2015. A member of the Republican Party of Minnesota, Baker represents District 16B in west-central Minnesota, which includes the city of Willmar and parts of Kandiyohi County.

== Early life and education ==
Baker was raised in Hamel, Minnesota. He attended Aitkin High School and the St. Cloud Area Vocational Technical Institute, studying sales and management.

Baker has owned and operated restaurants, hotels and small businesses. He ran a restaurant in Willmar, Minnesota, for 12 years before his election to the legislature. Baker also owns Green Lake Cruises in western Minnesota and a Super 8 motel.

== Minnesota House of Representatives ==
Baker was elected to the Minnesota House of Representatives in 2014 and has been reelected every two years since. He defeated one-term DFL incumbent Mary Sawatsky.

Baker is the minority lead on the Workforce Development Finance and Policy Committee and sits on the Human Services Finance and Human Services Policy Committees. He also serves as an assistant minority leader, a position he has held since 2021. From 2015 to 2016, Baker was an assistant majority leader.

=== Opioid epidemic ===
In 2011, Baker's 25-year-old son Daniel died of a heroin overdose, after becoming addicted to opioids legally prescribed for an injury. In the legislature, Baker has been active in addressing the opioid epidemic. In 2016 he supported legislation to require pharmacists to create accounts on an opioid prescription monitoring website set up by the state, but stopped short of mandating them to use it. Baker has authored legislation that would impose tougher restrictions on prescribing opioids, require doctors to check patient histories, reduce the duration of prescriptions and expand safe disposal sites at pharmacies. Baker co-authored legislation that would require doctors to check up on patients before prescribing opioid painkillers.

In 2018, Baker worked on the "Opioid Epidemic Response Law" with DFL State Senator Chris Eaton, who also lost a child to opioids. Baker carried legislation in 2017 that imposed a "penny a pill" or "stewardship fee" on opioid manufacturers. The fee was supported by Democrats and Governor Mark Dayton, but opposed by other House Republicans and the pharmaceutical lobby, which fought for the provision to be removed. Baker removed the fee from his version of the bill, saying he was "frustrated" by the pharmaceutical companies' objections. He said he was "unable to convince my colleagues" to adopt the fee increases. The opioid legislation passed with bipartisan support and was signed by Dayton, and ultimately lawmakers compromised and decided that the fees would be scaled back in the case of a legal settlement.

Baker was named to the Opioid Response Advisory Council by Governor Tim Walz, and later served as the council's chair. In 2021, a nationwide settlement with opioid manufacturer Johnson & Johnson included $296 million over 18 years to the state of Minnesota. The advisory council will oversee the spending of these funds. Baker called for the money to be used on addiction and opioid-related services, and was praised by Attorney General Keith Ellison for his leadership on the issue.

=== Other political positions ===
Baker was one of two Republican House members who voted in support of legislation to restore the right of undocumented immigrants to get driver's licenses in 2019. Baker opposed the bill when it passed the House again in 2023.

Baker has called for law enforcement to have more authority over fentanyl. In 2021, he voted against a bill to legalize marijuana in Minnesota, citing it as a gateway drug that could lead to the use of dangerous substances like opioids. Baker also said he opposed legalization due to an increase in the use of vaping devices, especially among youth. He voted against legislation sponsored by Representative Matt Dean that would have eliminated MinnesotaCare, a public health care option. Baker sponsored legislation to invest in rural broadband expansion.

Baker supported legislation that curbed increases in the minimum wage for tipped workers. He also voted for legislation that would block the cities of Minneapolis and St. Paul from increasing their minimum wage ordinances.

=== COVID-19 pandemic ===
Baker opposed state masking mandates, and told his employees not to ask about medical conditions or force customers to wear face masks. He authored legislation to limit the governor's use of executive powers, and criticized Governor Walz's pandemic lockdown policy, advocating that all pandemic restrictions end by May 2021. Baker's business received over $50,000 in Paycheck Protection Program (PPP) funds during the COVID-19 pandemic.

== Electoral history ==
2014 Minnesota State House - District 17B
Party	Candidate	Votes	%
Republican	Dave Baker	7,807	50.66
Democratic (DFL)	Mary Sawatzky (incumbent)	7,593	49.27
Write-in		10	0.06
Total votes		15,410	100.0
Republican gain from Democratic (DFL)			

2016 Minnesota State House - District 17B
Party	Candidate	Votes	%
Republican	Dave Baker (incumbent)	11,908	59.51
Democratic (DFL)	Mary Sawatzky	8,075	40.36
Write-in		26	0.13
Total votes		20,009	100.0
Republican hold			

2018 Minnesota State House - District 17B
Party	Candidate	Votes	%
Republican	Dave Baker (incumbent)	11,908	69.11
Democratic (DFL)	Anita Flowe	5,311	30.82
Write-in		11	0.06
Total votes		17,230	100.0
Republican hold			

2020 Minnesota State House - District 17B
Party	Candidate	Votes	%
Republican	Dave Baker (incumbent)	14,997	70.67
Democratic (DFL)	Logan Kortgard	6,198	29.21
Write-in		27	0.13
Total votes		21,222	100.0
Republican hold			

2022 Minnesota State House - District 16B
Party	Candidate	Votes	%
Republican	Dave Baker (incumbent)	12,828	72.76
Democratic (DFL)	Fred Cogelow	4,794	27.19
Write-in		8	0.05
Total votes		17,630	100.0
Republican hold			

== Personal life ==
Baker has been married to his wife, Mary, since 1985. They have three children and reside in Willmar, Minnesota.
