= Ginny Klevorn =

American politician

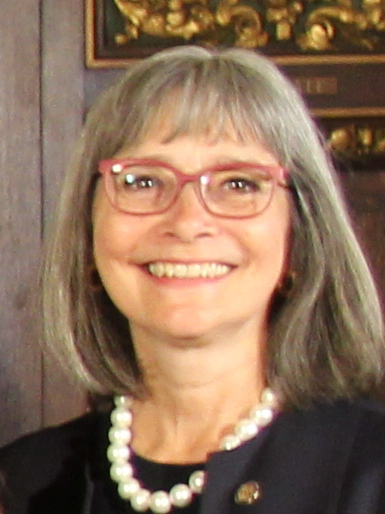

Member of the Minnesota House of Representatives from the 42B district
- Incumbent
- Assumed office January 8, 2019
- Preceded by: Sarah Anderson

Personal details
- Born: 1958 or 1959 (age 66–67)
- Party: Democratic (DFL)
- Spouse: Tom
- Children: 3
- Education: Saint Louis University (B.S.)
- Occupation: Professional mediator; Legislator
- Website: Government website Campaign website

Ginny Klevorn (/ˈkʰl̥i.voɹn/; born 1959) is an American politician serving in the Minnesota House of Representatives since 2019. A member of the Minnesota Democratic–Farmer–Labor Party (DFL), Klevorn represents District 42B in the western Twin Cities metropolitan area, which includes the city of Plymouth and parts of Hennepin County.

== Early life, education, and career ==
Klevorn's family has lived in Belgium and Brazil. In Brazil, she volunteered for Catholic relief agencies in the slums of cities. Klevorn attended Saint Louis University, graduating with a Bachelor of Science in business administration. She is a professional mediator.

Klevorn served on the Minnesota Office of Lawyers Professional Responsibility Board and the Wayzata School District Legislative Action Committee. She was a guardian ad litem in the 4th Judicial District juvenile court.

== Minnesota House of Representatives ==
Klevorn was elected to the Minnesota House of Representatives in 2018 and has been reelected every two years since. She first ran in 2016, losing to five-term Republican incumbent Sarah Anderson. She challenged Anderson again in 2018 and won, in a race that generated the most outside spending that year.

Klevorn chairs the State and Local Government Finance and Policy Committee and sits on the Commerce Finance and Policy, Ethics, Higher Education Finance and Policy, and Ways and Means Committees. From 2019 to 2020, she served as vice chair of the State Government Finance Committee, and from 2021 to 2022 she was vice chair of the Redistricting Committee.

Klevorn authored legislation to form a citizen advisory redistricting commission to draw legislative boundaries, rather than relying on the courts as Minnesota had in multiple redistricting cycles. In 2022, she sponsored a bill to ban political parties from setting up exclusive political clubs for lobbyists to access politicians after the Senate Republican Campaign fund made a request for such a club at the state legislature. She has spoken out against the payday loan industry's predatory practices.

Klevorn wrote a bill to prohibit evictions from assisted-living homes during public health emergencies like COVID-19. When Sanford Health and Fairview announced an intention to merge, Klevorn questioned the move and advocated for additional financial transparency from the companies.

== Electoral history ==
2016 Minnesota State House - District 44A
Party	Candidate	Votes	%
Republican	Sarah Anderson (incumbent)	13,486	54.04
Democratic (DFL)	Ginny Klevorn	11,443	45.82
Write-in		35	0.14
Total votes		24,954	100.0
Republican hold			

2018 Minnesota State House - District 44A
Party	Candidate	Votes	%
Democratic (DFL)	Ginny Klevorn	12,995	53.85
Republican	Sarah Anderson (incumbent)	11,119	46.08
Write-in		18	0.07
Total votes		24,132	100.0
Democratic (DFL) gain from Republican			

2020 Minnesota State House - District 44A
Party	Candidate	Votes	%
Democratic (DFL)	Ginny Klevorn (incumbent)	17,644	59.63
Republican	Perry Nouis	11,929	40.32
Write-in		14	0.05
Total votes		29,587	100.0
Democratic (DFL) hold			

2022 Minnesota State House - District 42B
Party	Candidate	Votes	%
Democratic (DFL)	Ginny Klevorn (incumbent)	12,422	60.59
Republican	Jackie Schroeder	8,071	39.37
Write-in		9	0.04
Total votes		20,502	100.0
Democratic (DFL) hold			

== Personal life ==
Klevorn and her husband, Tom, have three children. She resides in Plymouth, Minnesota. She is Catholic.
