= 2023 Minnesota House of Representatives district 52B special election =

2023 Minnesota House of Representatives District 52B special election
- December 5, 2023

Minnesota House of Representatives District 52B
Nominee	Bianca Virnig	Cynthia Lonnquist
Party	Democratic (DFL)	Republican
Popular vote	3,853	2,705
Percentage	58.22%	40.87%
Representative before election
Ruth Richardson
Democratic (DFL)
Elected Representative
Bianca Virnig
Democratic (DFL)

A special election was held in the U.S. state of Minnesota on December 5, 2023, to elect a new representative for District 52B in the Minnesota House of Representatives. The election was caused by the resignation of DFL incumbent Ruth Richardson who left the legislature to focus on her role at Minnesota's Planned Parenthood affiliate. The special election was won by DFL candidate Bianca Virnig with 58% of votes cast.

== Background ==
District 52B covers parts of Eagan, Mendota, and Mendota Heights. The Democratic-Farmer-Labor (DFL) Party and Republican Party of Minnesota held a primary to select their candidates for the special election on November 16, 2023. There was only one Republican running in the primary. The Libertarian Party nominated their candidate without a primary.

== Candidates ==
=== Republican Party ===
- Cynthia Lonnquist, business owner; ran against Richardson in 2022 general election.

=== Democratic–Farmer–Labor Party ===
- Bianca Virnig, a member of the Rosemount-Apple Valley-Eagan School Board since 2021.
- Jay Miller, teacher and Mendota Heights firefighter
- Cynthia Callais, former DFL legislative aide
- Chris Whitfield, Eagan Advisory Planning Commission member and local DFL officer.

==== Libertarian Party ====
- Charles Kuchlenz

== Results ==
2023 Minnesota House of Representatives District 52B special election
Party	Candidate	Votes	%	∆pp
Democratic–Farmer–Labor Party	Bianca Virnig	3,853	58.22	–3.45
Republican Party	Cynthia Lonnquist	2,705	40.87	+2.64
Libertarian Party	Charles Kuchlenz	59	0.89	+0.89
Write-in	N/A	1	0.02	–0.08
Total		6,618	100.00	±0.00

== See also ==
- List of special elections to the Minnesota House of Representatives
