= Bianca Virnig =

American politician

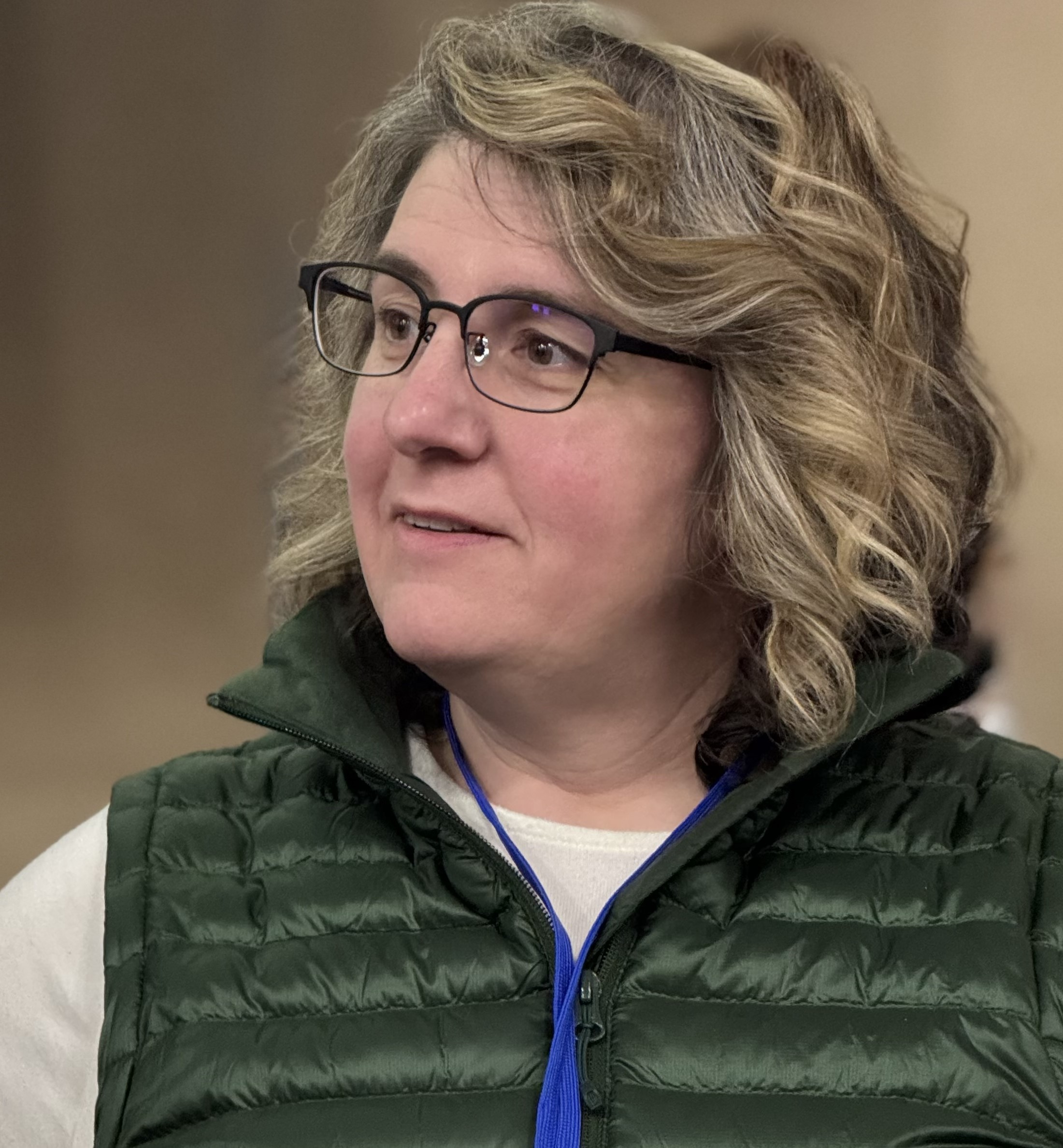

Member of the Minnesota House of Representatives from District 52B
- Incumbent
- Assumed office January 12, 2024
- Preceded by: Ruth Richardson

Personal details
- Party: Democratic–Farmer–Labor
- Education: Century College (AA); University of Minnesota (BA)
- Website: House website

Bianca Ward Virnig (/ˈvɜːrnɪɡ/ VUR-nig) is an American politician who has served as a member of the Minnesota House of Representatives since 2024 after winning a special election. A member of the Democratic–Farmer–Labor Party, she represents District 52B.

In 2024, Virnig settled with a former private employer after her special election to the House, and was awarded damages in the excess of $108,000 after paying $10,000+ in legal fees through state funds. Beginning the 2025 legislative session, Virnig participated in a boycott with the rest of the House DFL Caucus.

== Electoral history ==
2023 Minnesota House of Representatives District 52B special election
Party	Candidate	Votes	%
Democratic (DFL)	Bianca Virnig (incumbent)	3,853	58.22
Republican	Cynthia Lonnquist	2,705	40.87
Libertarian	Charles Kuchlenz	59	0.89
Write-in		1	0.02
Total votes		6,618	100.0
Democratic (DFL) hold			

2024 Minnesota House of Representatives election - District 52B
Party	Candidate	Votes	%
Democratic (DFL)	Bianca Virnig (incumbent)	15,857	60.57
Republican	Douglas Willetts	10,291	39.31
Write-in		31	0.12
Total votes		26,179	100.0
Democratic (DFL) hold			
