= Tim O'Driscoll =

American politician (born 1964)

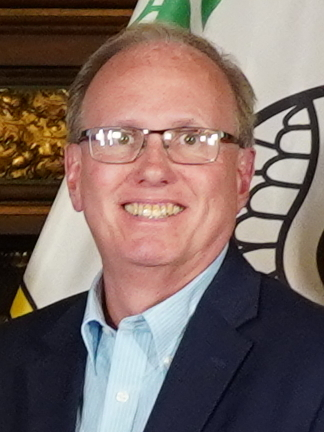

Member of the Minnesota House of Representatives from the 13B district 14A (2011–2013)
- Incumbent
- Assumed office January 4, 2011
- Preceded by: Dan Severson
- Succeeded by: Dawn Loberg (elect)

Personal details
- Born: April 22, 1964 (age 62) Sartell, Minnesota, U.S.
- Party: Republican Party of Minnesota
- Education: St. Cloud State University
- Profession: Corporate trainer, legislator

Timothy J. O'Driscoll (born April 22, 1964) is an American politician serving in the Minnesota House of Representatives since 2011. A member of the Republican Party of Minnesota, O'Driscoll represents District 13B in north-central Minnesota, which includes the cities of Sartell and Sauk Rapids and parts of Benton and Stearns Counties.

== Early education and career ==
O'Driscoll graduated from Sartell High School in Sartell, then attended St. Cloud State University in St. Cloud, earning a B.S. in business education, office administration and real estate planning and development.

O'Driscoll served on the Sartell City Council from 1993 to 1995 and 2002 to 2006. In 2007, he was elected mayor of Sartell, a position he held until 2011. He also served as president of the Sartell Economic Development Authority, secretary and an executive board member of the St. Cloud Area Planning Organization, and board chair of the St. Cloud Area Joint Planning District. He is a founding member of Sartell's SummerFest. He is a corporate trainer for Kaplan Professional Schools and a former real estate agent.

== Minnesota House of Representatives ==
O'Driscoll was elected to the Minnesota House of Representatives in 2010 and has been reelected every two years since. In 2017-18, he chaired the Government Operations & Elections Policy Committee. O'Driscoll is the minority lead on the Commerce Finance and Policy Committee and also serves on the Property Tax Division of the Taxes Committee.

== Electoral history ==
2010 Minnesota State House - District 14A
Party	Candidate	Votes	%
Republican	Tim O'Driscoll	10,541	61.18
Democratic (DFL)	Rob Jacobs	6,678	38.76
Write-in		11	0.06
Total votes		17,230	100.0
Republican hold			

2012 Minnesota State House - District 13B
Party	Candidate	Votes	%
Republican	Tim O'Driscoll	12,076	60.22
Democratic (DFL)	Shannon Schroeder	7,946	39.62
Write-in		32	0.16
Total votes		20,054	100.0
Republican hold			

2014 Minnesota State House - District 13B
Party	Candidate	Votes	%
Republican	Tim O'Driscoll	11,284	97.48
Write-in		292	2.52
Total votes		11,516	100.0
Republican hold			

2016 Minnesota State House - District 13B
Party	Candidate	Votes	%
Republican	Tim O'Driscoll	14,882	69.63
Democratic (DFL)	Matthew Crouse	6,465	39.62
Write-in		26	0.12
Total votes		21,373	100.0
Republican hold			

2018 Minnesota State House - District 13B
Party	Candidate	Votes	%
Republican	Tim O'Driscoll	12,146	64.32
Democratic (DFL)	Heidi L. Everett	6,731	35.65
Write-in		6	0.03
Total votes		18,883	100.0
Republican hold			

2020 Minnesota State House - District 13B
Party	Candidate	Votes	%
Republican	Tim O'Driscoll	16,524	68.16
Democratic (DFL)	Benjamin Carollo	7,684	31.70
Write-in		34	0.14
Total votes		24,242	100.0
Republican hold			

2022 Minnesota State House - District 13B
Party	Candidate	Votes	%
Republican	Tim O'Driscoll	12,256	66.75
Democratic (DFL)	Melissa Bromenschenkel	6,092	33.18
Write-in		14	0.08
Total votes		18,362	100.0
Republican hold			
