= Jim Nash (politician) =

American politician (born 1967)

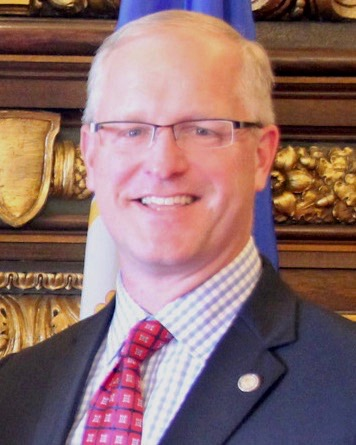

Member of the Minnesota House of Representatives District 47A (2015–2023) District 48A (2023–present)
- Incumbent
- Assumed office January 6, 2015
- Preceded by: Ernie Leidiger

Personal details
- Born: September 23, 1967 (age 58)
- Party: Republican
- Spouse: Kim
- Children: 6
- Education: University of Arkansas; University of Nebraska, Omaha (BA, MA)
- Website: State House website Campaign website

James A. Nash (born September 23, 1967) is an American politician serving in the Minnesota House of Representatives since 2015. A member of the Republican Party of Minnesota, Nash represents District 48A in the western Twin Cities metropolitan area, which includes the cities of Waconia, Victoria, and Chaska, and parts of Carver County.

== Early life, education, and career ==
Nash graduated from the University of Nebraska Omaha with a B.A. in geographic information systems and political geography and attended graduate school there for geography.

Nash was elected to the Waconia City Council in 2008, and served two terms as mayor of Waconia from 2011 to 2014. He works in the cybersecurity industry.

== Minnesota House of Representatives ==
Nash was elected to the Minnesota House of Representatives in 2014 and has been reelected every two years since. He first ran after two-term Republican incumbent Ernie Leidiger announced he would not seek reelection. Nash defeated a primary opponent, Bob Frey, who received news coverage for his controversial views.

Nash served as the minority leader on the State and Local Government Finance and Policy Committee and sits on the Housing Finance and Policy, Rules and Legislative Administration, and Ways and Means Committees. Nash served as an assistant majority leader from 2017 to 2018 and was mentioned as a possible candidate for majority leader in 2018. He served as an assistant minority leader from 2019 to 2022.

During the 2016 Republican presidential primary, Nash joined 21 state Republican leaders in endorsing Carly Fiorina. In 2021, Nash supported the decision of Republican Party of Minnesota Chair Jennifer Carnahan to retire after a close associate and campaign donor, Anthony Lazarro, was indicted on charges of sex trafficking.

In 2019, Governor Tim Walz's administration approached Nash, who works in the cybersecurity industry, about applying to be the head of the state's IT system, MNIT. Nash declined, saying, "It's a job that even under a Republican governor I don't know that I would have taken". He said he was cautiously optimistic about the eventual candidate, Tarek Tomes.

In 2025, Nash became the Minnesota House's majority whip.

=== Political positions ===
Nash authored a bill to create a Legislative Commission on Cybersecurity and later served as a member, calling for regular briefings on the state of Minnesota's cybersecurity. He has called for more investments in cybersecurity and cyber attack preparedness, saying, "It's not a matter of if, it's a matter of when" a breach occurs. He criticized MNIT, the state's IT system, especially after a failed 2018 rollout of the state's licensing and registry system, and called for a bipartisan working group to look for solutions to improve the systems. He authored legislation requiring MNIT to first look for private-sector bids on state IT projects before designing its own software.

==== Elections ====
Nash joined Secretary of State Steve Simon in calling for election infrastructure security improvements and increasing funding to combat cyber threats and later supported the proposals in committee. He has opposed efforts to restore voting rights to felons on parole and to implement automatic voter registration at government offices like DMVs. He has criticized DFLers for pushing legislation that lacks bipartisan support, saying it is "advancing the partisanship in Minnesota around elections".

In 2020, Nash opposed moves by Secretary Simon to expand mail-in voting and reduce in-person polling places during the COVID-19 pandemic, saying it "provides for a lot of electioneering and it does open the door for election fraud". He opposed a move by Simon to send letters to registered voters who had not requested absentee ballots and encouraging them to vote from home and for settling a lawsuit over mail-in ballots. He said he was "diametrically opposed" to universal vote-by-mail, and said he would support expanding no-excuse absentee voting and in-person early voting instead. Nash called for Simon to investigate ballot harvesting allegations made by the conservative activist group Project Veritas.

Nash, who declined to run against Simon in 2022, said election integrity was a "top focus" of the Republican Party but said beating Simon would be an uphill battle.

==== Transportation ====
Nash has opposed raising taxes to pay for roads and bridges, saying he would reallocate money away from light rail and transit. He has criticized the Metropolitan Council, a regional government transit planning organization, and called for reforms to the council. He has opposed the Southwest Light Rail Line, criticized the council's management of the project, and supported a legislative audit.

==== Public safety and crime ====
Nash has spoken about "rampant lawlessness" in Minneapolis after going on a ride-along, said he found conversations about defunding the police "alarming," and proposed tying state money for city projects to police staffing requirements. He opposed legislation that would disarm police officers of military-grade equipment, and requirements that police officers live in the communities they serve. After protestors brought down a statue of Christopher Columbus on the state Capitol grounds, Nash said he opposed the action but would have been open to considering the statue's removal through an established process. He also opposed calls to limit where protests can occur on Capitol grounds, saying it would limit free speech.

Nash opposed limiting felony-sentence probation lengths to five years, and criticized Corrections Commissioner Paul Schnell for violating state open meeting laws when he tried to implement the change.

===== Gun laws =====
Nash has said he is a "very vocal supporter of the Second Amendment". He has opposed many gun violence prevention measures, saying: "We don't need more gun control. We have plenty of gun laws... What we need is criminal control". He has opposed universal background checks, saying, "a background check isn't going to slow down someone who is intent on committing a crime". Nash has argued in favor of stricter penalties for criminals who use guns, saying it would get more guns off the street. In addressing school shootings, Nash has opposed further gun control and said he would support increasing physical security presences.

Nash has introduced "stand your ground" legislation allowing those to use lethal force to stop felonies and bills eliminating training requirements for obtaining a permit-to-carry and eliminating the need for a permit to carry a gun on public property. He authored a 2019 law giving provisional firearms safety certificated to people with disabilities given they hunt with another adults.

==== Housing ====
Nash, who served on the Legislative Commission on Housing Affordability, called for reform to city mandates to lot size and other requirements to increasing housing supply. He has criticized cities for charging high fees on building permits to pay for other government services and called for cities to refund the additional money. Nash opposed legislation to manage the end of the COVID-19 pandemic eviction moratorium, saying it was skewed too heavily towards renters.

==== Abortion ====
Nash signed on to a letter calling on Attorney General Lori Swanson to investigate Planned Parenthood for allegedly selling fetal body parts and called on the University of Minnesota to stop participating in research on "aborted human fetal organs". He has criticized the DFL's abortion rights policies as "overreaching" and "an abomination".

==== Other political positions ====
Nash criticized Swanson, saying she was "defiant" with the legislature and "out of touch as an auditor". He criticized a proposal to redesign the Minnesota state flag, saying it should not be a legislative priority and a planned redesign of the State Office Building, citing the high cost to taxpayers. Nash supported legislation to block minimum wage increases in St. Paul and Minneapolis.

Nash wrote legislation to allow blaze pink hunting clothes to be allowed in the state, and submitted a "lighthearted" amendment during a debate on banning the wolf hunt that would have reintroduced wild wolves to the Twin Cities metropolitan area. He authored a bill to give tax credits to businesses to create apprenticeship programs at Greater Minnesota high schools.

Nash authored an amendment to limit monthly rent payments for a temporary residence for Governor Walz after officials signed a deal to pay more than $17,000 a month to lease a house while the governor's residence was renovated. He supported legislation to divest any Minnesota investments into Russia after the 2022 invasion of Ukraine.

Nash authored a bill to allow grocery stores and other food retailers to sell beer, wine, and Minnesota-distilled spirits, and supported moves to allow take-out for alcohol during the COVID-19 pandemic. He has supported so-called "free the growler laws", which would allow Minnesota breweries to sell cans and to-go growlers from taprooms and restaurants. In 2021 he sponsored a bipartisan bill that would lift the limit, and said it was "really disappointing" that the bill failed to move forward in both the House and the Senate. He supported a compromise proposal that passed the House in 2022.

== Electoral history ==
2014 Minnesota State House - District 47A
Party	Candidate	Votes	%
Republican	Jim Nash	10,934	67.63
Democratic (DFL)	Matthew Gieseke	5,186	32.08
Write-in		47	0.29
Total votes		16,167	100.0
Republican hold			

2016 Minnesota State House - District 47A
Party	Candidate	Votes	%
Republican	Jim Nash (incumbent)	16,696	71.50
Democratic (DFL)	Sean White	6,631	28.40
Write-in		25	0.11
Total votes		23,352	100.0
Republican hold			

2018 Minnesota State House - District 47A
Party	Candidate	Votes	%
Republican	Jim Nash (incumbent)	14,106	64.70
Democratic (DFL)	Madalynn Gerold	7,680	35.23
Write-in		16	0.07
Total votes		21,802	100.0
Republican hold			

2020 Minnesota State House - District 47A
Party	Candidate	Votes	%
Republican	Jim Nash (incumbent)	19,267	67.35
Democratic (DFL)	Arlan Brinkmeier	9,308	32.54
Write-in		31	0.11
Total votes		28,606	100.0
Republican hold			

2022 Minnesota State House - District 48A
Party	Candidate	Votes	%
Republican	Jim Nash (incumbent)	13,018	59.66
Democratic (DFL)	Nathan Kells	8,785	40.26
Write-in		19	0.09
Total votes		21,822	100.0
Republican hold			

2024 Minnesota State House - District 48A
Party	Candidate	Votes	%
Republican	Jim Nash (incumbent)	16,818	60.41
Democratic (DFL)	Nathan Kells	11,000	39.51
Write-in		23	0.08
Total votes		27,841	100.0
Republican hold			

== Personal life ==
Nash lives in Waconia, Minnesota with his spouse, Kim, and has six children.
