= Cannabis in Minnesota =

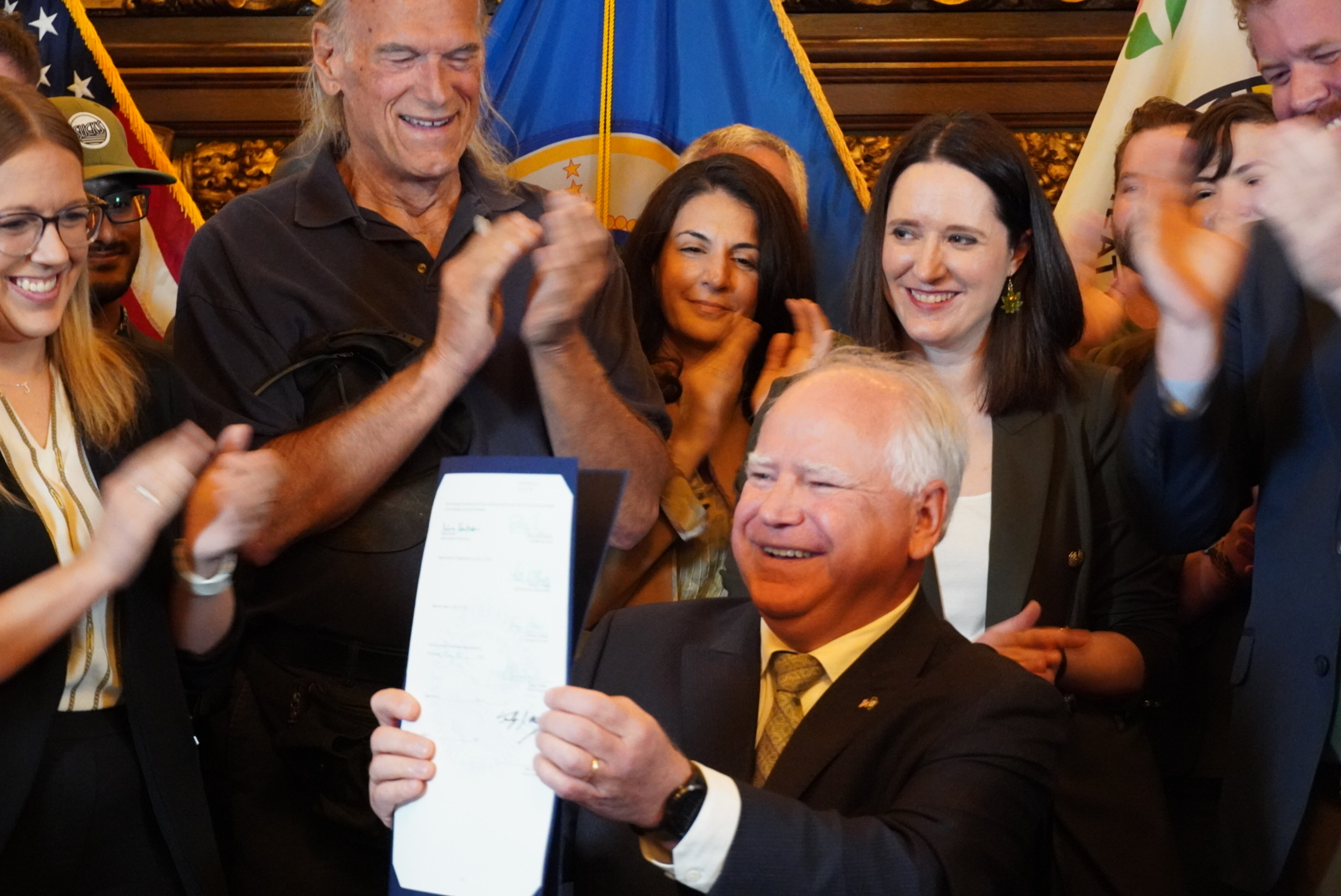
Governor Tim Walz celebrates the signing of House File 100 to legalize recreational cannabis in Minnesota with lawmakers and former governor Jesse Ventura (May 2023).

Cannabis in Minnesota is legal for recreational use since August 2023. Governor Tim Walz signed House File 100 on May 30, 2023, legalizing the use, possession, and cultivation of cannabis within the state. The state's new Office of Cannabis Management will establish a regulatory framework for commercial cultivation and sales, with exceptions for tribal nations.

Minnesota law permits adults who are 21 years of age or older to purchase and possess up to 2 pounds (900 g) of marijuana flower (2 ounces [57 g] in a public space), 8 grams of concentrate, and 800 mg of infused edibles in a private residence. Growing at home is permitted, as long as the plants cannot be seen from outside. Individuals may cultivate up to eight plants, with only four flowering at once. Adults who are 21 years of age or older may also gift each other any amount up to the legal limit.

Recreational cannabis sales (outside tribal jurisdictions) began on September 16, 2025.

== History ==
=== Decriminalization ===
In 1976, during a short-lived wave of decriminalization in the United States, Minnesota reduced the penalty and decriminalized possession for 42.5 grams (1 1/2 oz) or less to a petty misdemeanor of a maximum $200 fine (equivalent to $1,100 in 2025).

=== Medical marijuana initiatives ===
The Minnesota Medical Marijuana Act creates a patient registry under the Department of Health relating to the therapeutic use of medical cannabis. It authorizes the use of medical cannabis in limited forms for certain qualifying medical conditions and regulates the distribution and manufacture of medical cannabis. It also creates a task force to conduct an impact assessment on medical cannabis therapeutic research and provides for certain criminal and civil protections for parties involved in the registry program. This passed the Minnesota House 89–40 and the Minnesota Senate 46–16. In May 2014, Governor Mark Dayton signed into law a bill legalizing marijuana for the treatment of nine severe medical conditions, including cancer, severe epilepsy, HIV/AIDS, glaucoma, Tourette's syndrome, ALS and Crohn's disease.

Registration for the program began on June 1, 2015, with actual distribution of medical marijuana beginning July 1, 2015. It is considered to be the most restrictive medical marijuana bill in the country, due to the limited number of medical conditions that qualify, and the forms of cannabis that are legal. To qualify for the program, patients must be diagnosed with one of the following conditions: Cancer (with pain, nausea, vomiting, and/or wasting), glaucoma, HIV/AIDS, Tourettes, ALS (Lou Gehrig's disease), a seizure disorder, multiple sclerosis, Crohn's disease, or a painful terminal illness with less than a year to live. For those individuals who meet the medical criteria, cannabis will only be legally available in liquid, pill or vaporized delivery method that does not require the use of dried leaves or plant form. In 2016, "intractable pain" was added to the list of qualifying conditions, with PTSD added August 1, 2017. Chronic pain and age-related macular degeneration were also added to the list of qualifying conditions on December 1, 2019; the changes went into effect in August 2020.

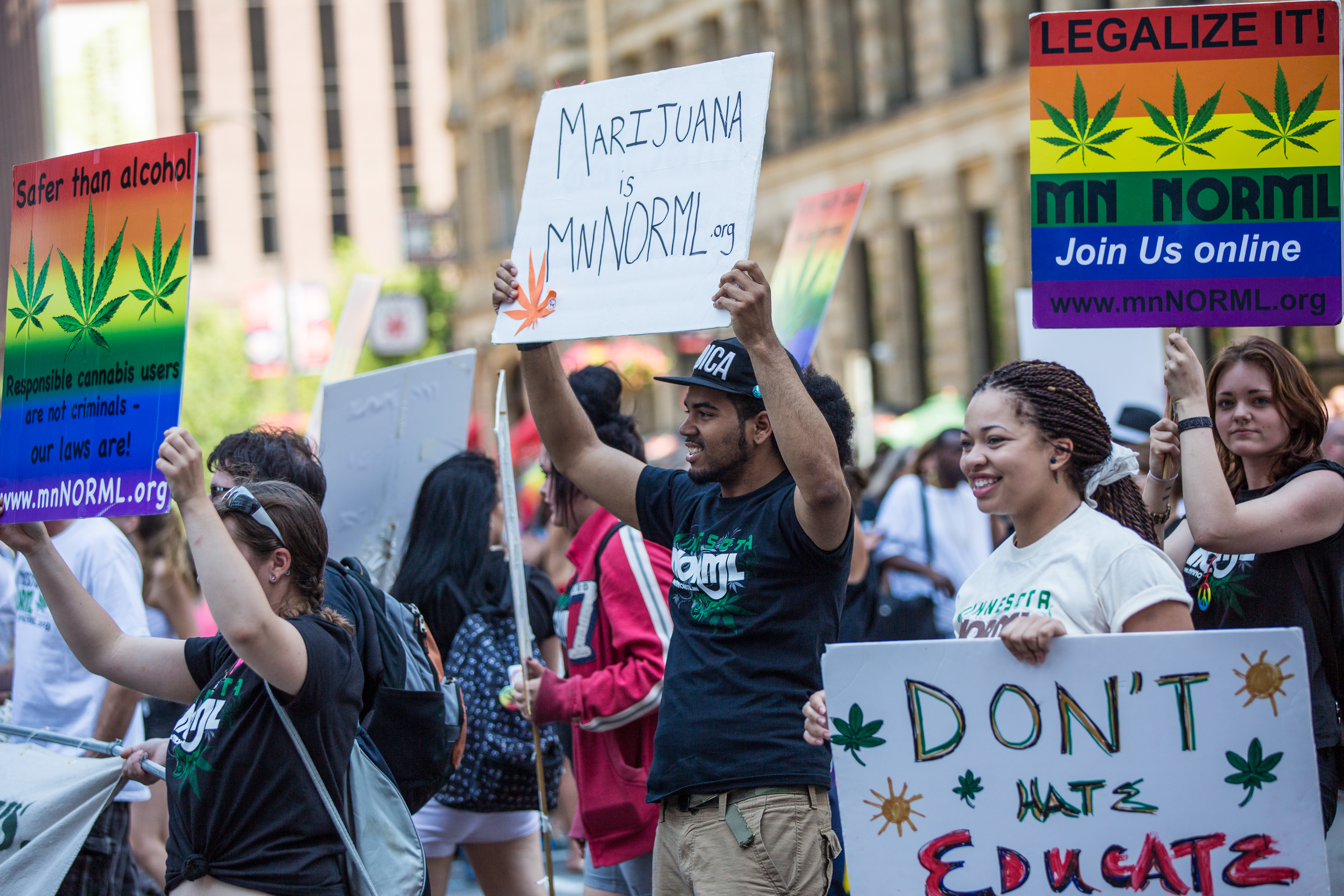
Cannabis legalization advocates at Twin Cities Pride Parade, 2013

=== Recreational-use cannabis legislation ===
On November 6, 2018, Tim Walz was elected Governor of Minnesota. Walz argued that legalizing cannabis could bring in a new source of tax revenue if regulated properly, and it could reduce the number of people locked up for drug offenses: "I just think the time is here and we're seeing it across the country. Minnesota has always been able to implement these things right."

On January 28, 2019, Senator Melisa Franzen (DFL-Edina), Senator Scott Jensen (R-Chaska), and Representative Mike Freiberg (DFL-Golden Valley) introduced a bill that would allow people over 21 to possess, grow, and purchase limited quantities of cannabis. In a statement from Senator Freiburg: "Our focus in drafting legislation to end the prohibition of cannabis in Minnesota is to ensure we have a responsible regulatory model for consumer access that still provides for public health, safety and welfare." he continued, "The time has come for us to have this debate."

On March 8, 2019, Republicans in the Minnesota Senate voted down a measure to legalize the recreational use of cannabis. Republicans also decided not to create a task-force to study the issue further. Sen. Melisa Franzen, who sponsored the measure, stated "We don't have a bill to move, so I think the debate is shut down in the Senate," noting that Governor Tim Walz could convene a task force of his own but chose to not do so. Several proposals remained under consideration in the House, including the creation of a task force, similar to what Franzen proposed, and a constitutional amendment to let voters decide the fate of legalizing, taxing and regulating the recreational use of cannabis.

On July 1, 2022, food and beverages containing tetrahydrocannabinol (THC) became legal in Minnesota if the chemical was derived from hemp. Packages were limited to a THC content of 50 mg total and 5 mg per serving. The legislation was enacted in part to address previously unregulated delta-8-tetrahydrocannabinol products. It is unclear if leaders of the Minnesota Senate understood that this legislation would legalize products with delta-9-tetrahydrocannabinol.

Democrats took control of the Minnesota Senate in the 2022 election and made it clear that cannabis would be on their list of top legislative priorities. In January 2023, Representative Zack Stephenson (DFL-Coon Rapids) and Senator Lindsey Port (DFL-Burnsville) introduced a bill to legalize recreational marijuana.

On April 24, 2023, the bill HF100 was passed by the Minnesota House 71–59 and a 34–33 party-line vote in the Minnesota Senate. After reconciling differences in the House and Senate versions of the bills, the updated legislation was reintroduced to the Minnesota House on May 18, where it passed with a 73–57 vote and transferred to the Senate the next day, passing with a 34–32 vote on May 20. On May 30, 2023, Governor Tim Walz signed the bill into law. Recreational use of cannabis became legal on August 1, 2023.

=== Implementation of legalized cannabis ===
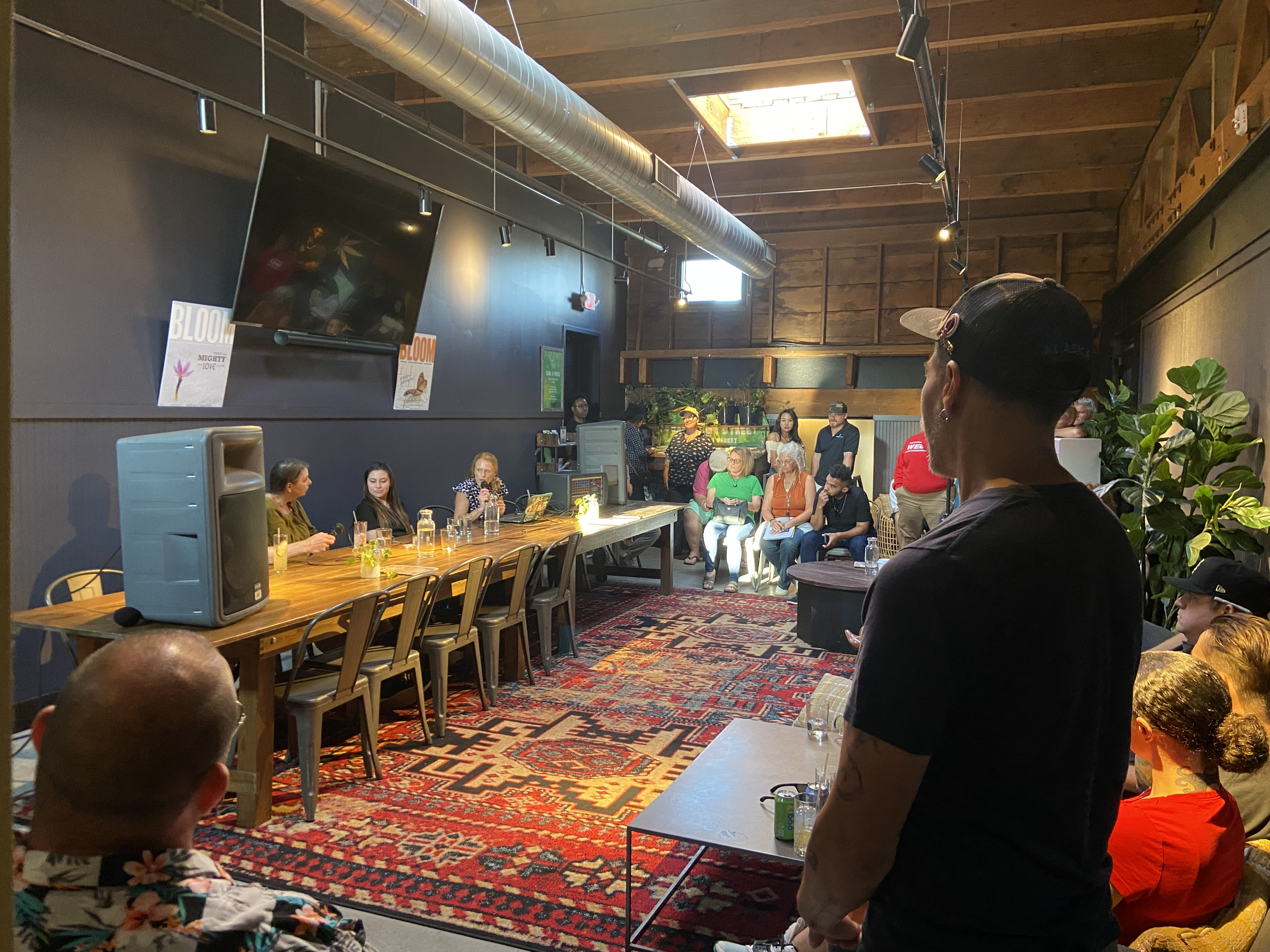
MN Craft Cannabis Guild panel presentation, "Building the Licensed Cannabis Market Together: Veterans Benefit from Cannabis"

Representative Zach Stephenson estimates that it will take at least a year to complete and implement the organized framework for recreational dispensaries, possession, sale, and cultivation after passage of HF100.

A new "Office of Cannabis Management" was introduced for regulation and law-enforcement, the addition of more than 12 types of licenses for commercial growers, a 10% sales tax on all cannabis sales in addition to state taxes, multiple treatment programs for victims of drug abuse, and providing grants to those with high interest in joining the cannabis market.

The bill also removes all penalties for cannabis possession and results in the expungement of all previous criminal convictions for first-time and subsequent cannabis possession offenses. It also authorizes operation of paid cannabis delivery services.

== Native American dispensaries ==
Several tribes currently operate dispensaries on their Minnesota reservations, including:

- Anang, Fond du Lac Band
- Ishkode, Bois Forte Band
- Sweetest Grass, Leech Lake Band of Ojibwe
- Waabigwan Mashkiki, White Earth Nation
- NativeCare, Red Lake Indian Reservation
- Island Peži, Prairie Island Indian Community
- Off The Path, Lower Sioux Community

== University of Minnesota ==
In November 2023, it was formally announced that the University of Minnesota would be immediately establishing a "research center" for cannabis.

== Banning cannabis odor vehicular searches ==
Effective August 1, 2024, Minnesota law bans police and law enforcement from vehicular searches based solely on cannabis odor.

== See also ==
- Cannabis political parties of Minnesota
- Minnesota NORML
