= Luke Frederick =

American politician

Member of the Minnesota House of Representatives from the 18B district
- Incumbent
- Assumed office January 5, 2021
- Preceded by: Jack Considine

Personal details
- Party: Democratic (DFL)
- Children: 2
- Education: Minnesota State University, Mankato (BS)
- Website: Government website

Luke Frederick is an American politician serving in the Minnesota House of Representatives since 2021. A member of the Democratic-Farmer-Labor Party (DFL), Frederick represents District 18B in south-central Minnesota, including the city of Mankato and parts of Blue Earth County.

== Early life, education and career ==
Frederick grew up in Eagle Lake, Minnesota, and earned a B.S. in corrections from the Minnesota State University, Mankato.

Frederick has worked in the healthcare industry and was also a member of the National Civilian Community Corps. He worked at the Saint Peter Regional Treatment Center for 17 years.

== Minnesota House of Representatives ==
Frederick was elected to the Minnesota House of Representatives in 2020 and was reelected in 2022. He first ran after three-term DFL incumbent Jack Considine announced he would not seek reelection.

Frederick is the vice chair of the Human Services Policy Committee and sits on the Agriculture Finance and Policy, Elections Finance and Policy, and Judiciary Finance and Civil Law Committees. He also has served as an assistant majority leader since 2023. From 2021 to 2022, Frederick served as vice chair of the Behavioral Health Policy Division of the Human Services Finance and Policy Committee.

== Electoral history ==
2020 Minnesota State House - District 19B
| Party | Candidate | Votes | % |
|---|---|---|---|
| Democratic (DFL) | Luke Frederick | 12,052 | 59.68 |
| Republican | Jeremy Loger | 8,098 | 40.10 |
| Write-in | | 44 | 0.22 |
| Total votes | | 20,194 | 100.0 |
| Democratic (DFL) hold | | | |

2022 Minnesota State House - District 18B
| Party | Candidate | Votes | % |
|---|---|---|---|
| Democratic (DFL) | Luke Frederick (incumbent) | 8,564 | 60.13 |
| Republican | Dar Vorsburg | 5,664 | 39.77 |
| Write-in | | 15 | 0.11 |
| Total votes | | 14,243 | 100.0 |
| Democratic (DFL) hold | | | |

2024 Minnesota State House - District 18B
| Party | Candidate | Votes | % |
|---|---|---|---|
| Democratic (DFL) | Luke Frederick (incumbent) | 10,892 | 55.64 |
| Republican | Dar Vorsburg | 8,650 | 44.18 |
| Write-in | | 35 | 0.18 |
| Total votes | | 19,577 | 100.0 |
| Democratic (DFL) hold | | | |

== Personal life ==
Frederick lives in Mankato, Minnesota and has two children.
