= Foung Hawj =

American media producer and politician

Foung Hawj 𖬌𖬰𖬜𖬵 𖬎𖬲𖬟
- Hawj in 2026

Member of the Minnesota Senate from the 67th district
- Incumbent
- Assumed office January 8, 2013
- Preceded by: redrawn district

Personal details
- Party: Democratic (DFL)
- Education: University of Kansas (B.A.); Rochester Institute of Technology (M.S.)
- Profession: Multimedia producer

Foung Hawj (/ˈfɒŋ ˈhɜːr/ FONG HUR; Chinese: 侯主福; Lao: ຝົງ ເຮີ; RPA: Foom Hawj; Pahawh: 𖬌𖬰𖬜𖬵 𖬎𖬲𖬟) is an American media producer and politician who is a member of the Minnesota Senate. A member of the Minnesota Democratic–Farmer–Labor Party (DFL), he represents District 67, which includes the east side of Saint Paul in Ramsey County.

== Early life, education, and career ==
Foung was born in Laos. His father was a military diplomat overseeing air deliveries of humanitarian cargo in Vientiane and Long Tieng. Like all Hmong girls at the time, his mother did not attend school, but she later learned to run a pharmacy in her village. Foung grew up during the Vietnam War and lived in refugee camps with his family before coming to the United States. He received his B.A. in media arts and computer science from the University of Kansas in 1990 and earned his M.S. in applied science and technology from the Rochester Institute of Technology in 2001.

Foung was a series producer for Twin Cities Public Television in the 1990s before starting his own multimedia business, Digital Motion LLC, in 1996. He co-founded the Hmong-American DFL Caucus in 1992 and other community organizations including Center for the Hmong Arts and Talent, the Minnesota Hmong Chamber of Commerce, and Gateway Food Initiative Co-op, which launched the development of the Mississippi Market on East 7th Street.

== Minnesota Senate ==
Foung Hawj ran in 2012, supported by the Sierra Club and a broad coalition that included Hmong-American, Latino, Somali, and African American voters. He won the primary, and won the general election on November 6. His legislative concerns include economic development, social and economic equity, education, housing, environment, and healthcare. His first-term accomplishments for District 67 include new business developments on 7th Street, the Science and Education Center for Metro State University, and job creation dollars to boost the local economy.

He kicked off his first reelection campaign on January 16, 2016, at the Carpenter Union in his district. Foung was reelected in 2016, 2020, and 2022.

Foung served as assistant minority leader in 2021-22, and currently serves as assistant majority leader and chair of the Environment, Climate, and Legacy Committee. He is also on the Jobs and Economic Development Committee and the Transportation Committee.

== Personal life ==
Foung is an outdoorsman and has worked as a videographer and scriptwriter, producing environmental videos. He has lived at the southern end of Lake Phalen since 2001 and captains a dragon boat team. He met his wife, Anna, in 1987 while attending Kansas University. He spells his last name Hawj in RPA so that English speakers can better approximate its pronunciation.

Minnesota Senate
New district Preceded by John Harrington prior redistricting	Senator from the 67th district 2013 – present	Incumbent
