= List of New England Patriots retired numbers =

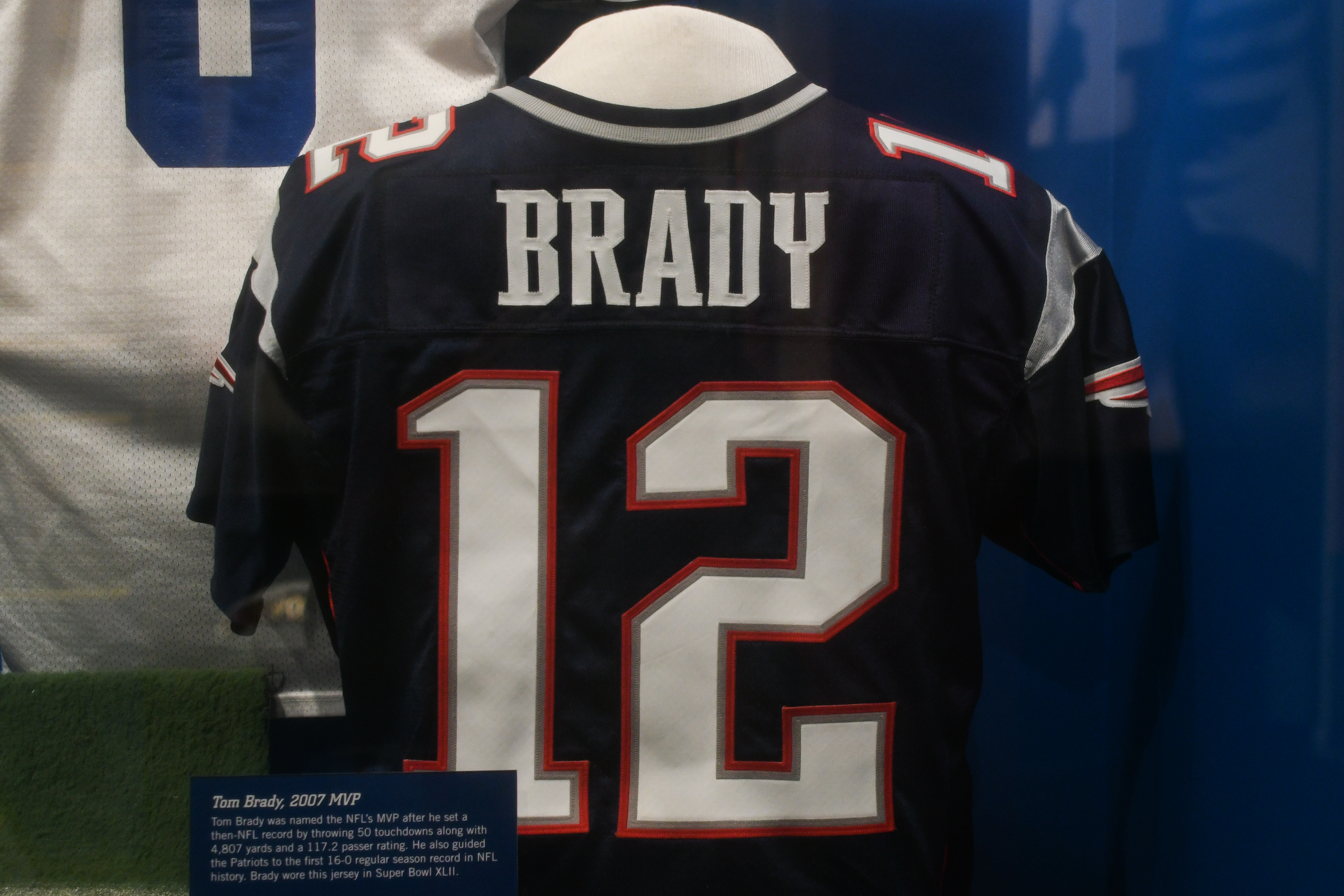
Tom Brady's #12 jersey displayed at the Pro Football Hall of Fame

The New England Patriots are a professional American football team based in Foxborough, Massachusetts. Since their founding in 1960 as the Boston Patriots, over 1,000 players, including 10 Pro Football Hall of Famers have played for the team. Of those players, eight have had their uniform numbers officially retired by the organization. Professional sports franchises, including the Patriots, retire uniform numbers to recognize the contributions that a player has made towards the team. It is customary that after the uniform number is retired, it is no longer worn by future players with that team.

== Patriots history ==
The earliest Patriot to have his number retired was Bob Dee (No. 89). Dee played defensive end for the Patriots for eight seasons where he was voted a four-time American Football League (AFL) All-Star, made the All-AFL second team four times, and made the Boston Patriots All-1960s Team. Dee also scored the first touchdown in the AFL, recovering a fumble in the end zone against the Buffalo Bills. Dee retired from professional football in 1968, being inducted into the Patriots Hall of Fame in 1993. In 1971, Gino Cappelletti and Jim Lee Hunt had their numbers retired (No. 20 and 79 respectively). Cappelletti played wide receiver and kicker for 11 seasons with the Patriots, leading the AFL in scoring five times. He was voted an AFL All-Star five times and was the 1964 AFL MVP. He also made the All-AFL second team four times and the Boston Patriots All-1960s Team. Until 2005, Cappelletti was the Patriots all-time leading scorer and remains third on their all-time points list. Hunt played defensive tackle for 11 seasons with the Patriots, making the AFL All-Star team four times, All-AFL second team four times, and the Boston Patriots All-1960s Team.

The most recent Patriot to have his number retired was Tom Brady (No. 12), who played quarterback for 20 seasons from 2000 to 2019. Widely considered to be the greatest player to ever play the game, Brady led the Patriots dynasty during his time there, winning 6 Super Bowls (XXXVI, XXXVIII, XXXIX, XLIX, LI, and LIII), and making the playoffs in nearly every year in which he started a game (with the exceptions of 2002, and 2008, when he suffered a season-ending ACL tear in Week 1). Brady also became the first, and to date only Patriot to win the AP MVP award, winning in 2007, 2010 (won unanimously), and 2017. He was inducted into the Patriots Hall of Fame on June 12, 2024.

== Retired numbers ==
New England Patriots retired numbers
No.	Player	Position	Tenure	Retired	Refs
12	Tom Brady	QB	2000–2019	2024	
20	Gino Cappelletti	FL/K	1960–1970	1971	
40	Mike Haynes	CB	1976–1982	1996	
57	Steve Nelson	LB	1974–1987	1988	
73	John Hannah	G	1973–1985	1990	
78	Bruce Armstrong	T	1987–2000	2001	
79	Jim Lee Hunt	DT	1960–1970	1971	
89	Bob Dee	DE	1960–1967	1968	

== See also ==
- List of NFL retired numbers
