= Tom Anzelc =

American politician

Member of the Minnesota House of Representatives from the 5B district 3A (2007–2013)
- In office January 3, 2007 – January 2, 2017
- Preceded by: Irv Anderson
- Succeeded by: Sandy Layman

Personal details
- Born: October 4, 1946 (age 79) Keewatin, Minnesota
- Party: Minnesota Democratic–Farmer–Labor Party
- Spouse: Jane (deceased)
- Children: 3
- Education: Hibbing Junior College; St. Cloud State University; Humphrey Institute
- Occupation: union official, educator

Thomas Anzelc (born October 4, 1946) is a Minnesota politician and former member of the Minnesota House of Representatives. A member of the Minnesota Democratic–Farmer–Labor Party, he represented District 5B in northern Minnesota.

== Early life, education, and career ==
Anzelc attended Nashwauk-Keewatin High School, graduating in 1964, then went on to Hibbing Junior College in Hibbing, receiving his A.A. in 1966, and to St. Cloud State University in St. Cloud, receiving his B.S. of Political Science in 1968. He later attended graduate school at the Humphrey Institute branch at the University of Minnesota in Duluth. He was a civics teacher and a basketball and cross country coach in Hibbing, and also worked as legislative coordinator for the Laborers Union District Council of Minnesota and North Dakota for 12 years.

Anzelc has been active in state and local government in multiple capacities, serving as a St. Louis County commissioner from 1980 to 1983, as executive director of the Minnesota Gambling Control Board, as executive director of the Minnesota Governor's Advisory Council on State and Local Government Relations, and as assistant commissioner of the Minnesota Department of Human Services under Governor Rudy Perpich.

== Minnesota House of Representatives ==
Anzelc was first elected in 2006, and was re-elected in 2008, 2010, 2012, and 2014. He lost re-election to Republican Sandy Layman in 2016.
