= 2026 Minnesota Amendment 1 =

Minnesota Amendment 1
- November 3, 2026

Results
Choice	Votes	%
Yes	2,068,080	72.79%
No	773,010	27.21%
Valid votes	2,841,090	100.00%
Invalid or blank votes	0	0.00%
Total votes	2,841,090	100.00%

Yes
90–100%
80–90%
70–80%
60–70%
50–60%
No
90–100%
80–90%
70–80%
60–70%
50–60%

2026 Minnesota Amendment 1 was a legislatively referred constitutional amendment. It will increase funding for public schools in Minnesota by amending article XI of the Minnesota Constitution, allowing schools to use more of the permanent school fund annually. Currently, only 2.5% of the fund is used annually. The amendment raises that amount to 4.5%. It would come into effect on July 1, 2027. The amendment passed with 72.79% of the vote.

A majority of voters must vote "yes" for the amendment to pass. Blank votes are counted as "nos". The bill was chiefly authored by State Senator Mary Kunesh, a DFLer. In the Minnesota House of Representatives, it was authored by Republican Spencer Igo. In the House, the bill passed unanimously. The bill received opposition in the Minnesota Senate, passing 43-24. Republican Zach Duckworth said he would have liked to see the amendment have more safeguards and that its passage would be financially unhealthy for the fund in the long term. The 4.5% rate is not written in the constitution but is instead a piece of companion legislation, subject to potential future change by the legislature. A conference committee voted 7-1 that a simple majority could change the rate. State Senator Robert Farnsworth said he was concerned that a future trifecta government could use the fund as a political bargaining chip. Igo argued that a simple majority would be struck down as unconstitutional, making a requirement for a supermajority unnecessary.

The amendment received support from school boards and educators. Its critics said that since the fund is partially funded by the mining and logging industry, it could allow these industries to expand in the state to the detriment of the environment. Supporters argued that no land use changes are expected. The bill had the Democratic-Farmer-Labor Party's formal support.

The text on the ballot read: "Shall the Minnesota Constitution be amended to increase the funding going to all school districts from the permanent school fund, which is a fund that supports school districts without raising individual income or property taxes, effective July 1, 2027?"

== Polls ==
Poll source	Date(s) administered	Sample size	Margin of error	Yes	No	Undecided
2026 State Fair Poll	August 26 – September 6, 2026	9605		77.7%	11.7%	10.5%

== Results ==
2026 Minnesota Amendment 1
Choice	Votes	%
For	2,068,080	72.79
Against	773,010	27.21
Total	2,841,090	100.00
