= Matt Little =

American attorney and politician (born 1984)

- Little in 2026

Member-elect of the U.S. House of Representatives from Minnesota's 2nd district
- Assuming office January 3, 2027
- Succeeding: Angie Craig

Member of the Minnesota Senate from the 58th district
- In office January 3, 2017 – January 5, 2021
- Preceded by: Dave Thompson
- Succeeded by: Zach Duckworth

Personal details
- Born: Matthew Martin Little; November 24, 1984 (age 41) Lakeville, Minnesota, U.S.
- Party: Democratic (DFL)
- Spouse: Coco Qi
- Children: 1
- Education: University of Minnesota, Morris (BA); University of Minnesota (JD)

Matthew Martin Little (born November 24, 1984) is an American attorney and politician who is the U.S. representative-elect for Minnesota's 2nd congressional district. A member of the Minnesota Democratic–Farmer–Labor Party (DFL), Little represented District 58 in the Minnesota Senate from 2017 to 2021.

Little was the DFL nominee for the United States House of Representatives in Minnesota's 2nd congressional district in 2026. He received the party endorsement for the seat in May and won the DFL primary on August 11 and the general election on November 3.

== Biography ==
=== Early life and education ===
Matt Little was born and raised in Lakeville, Minnesota, graduating from Rosemount High School in 2003 before earning a bachelor's degree in political science from the University of Minnesota Morris in 2007.

Little worked as a regional field coordinator for the National Association of Letter Carriers in Washington, D.C., for two years and spent a year teaching English in Chile before attending the University of Minnesota Law School. In 2014, he earned his Juris Doctor, graduating magna cum laude.

=== Early political career and attorney practice ===
In 2010, Little was elected to the Lakeville City Council. In 2012, at age 27, he became the youngest person to be elected mayor of Lakeville. He served as mayor until 2016, when he was elected to the state Senate.

Little works as an attorney at his Lakeville firm, Little Law, which focuses on medical malpractice and personal injury law. The Minnesota Star Tribune reported in 2025 that his practice represented seniors and people with disabilities as well as people who had been injured through negligence or abuse.

=== Minnesota Senate ===
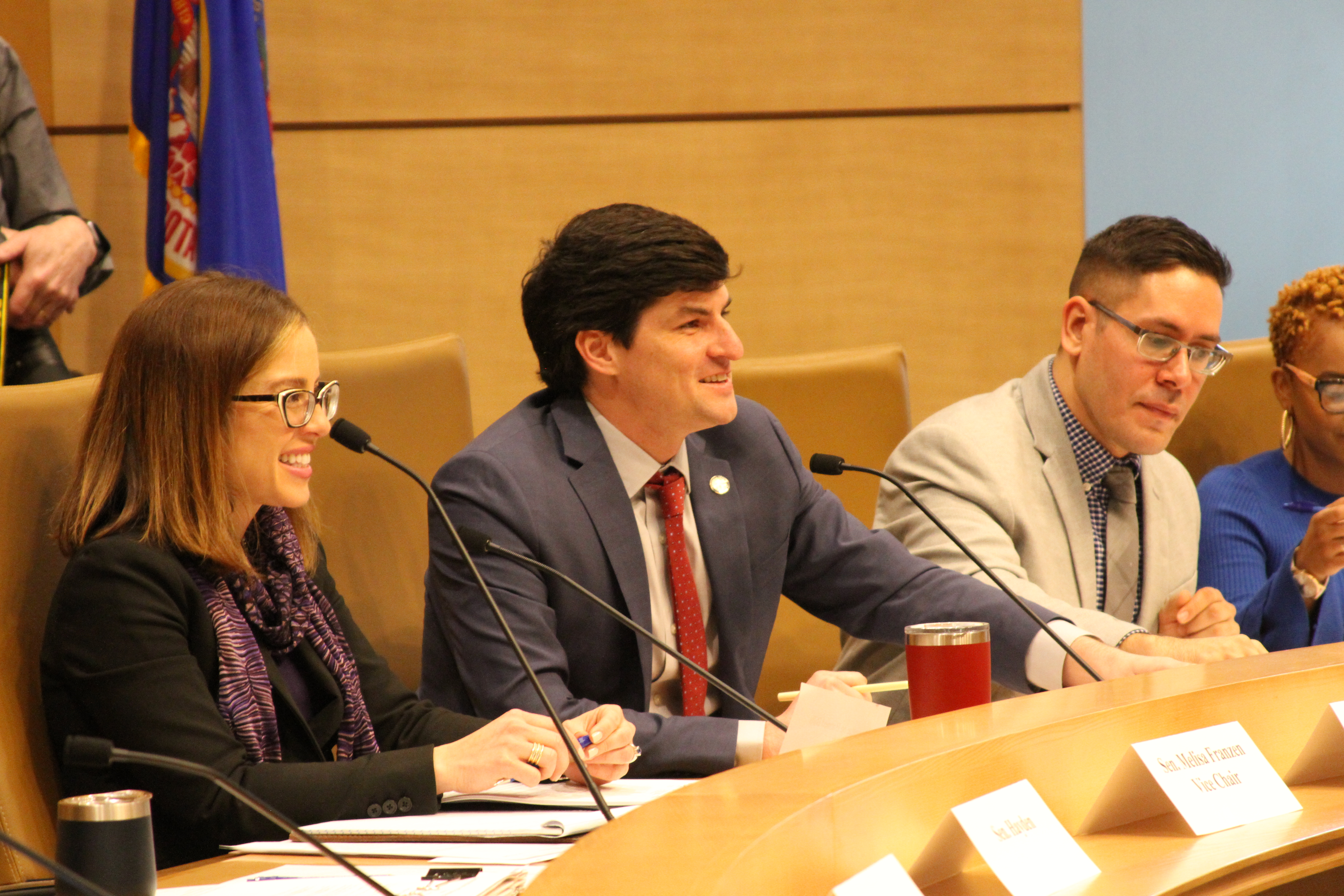
Little (center) in 2019

In 2016, Little was narrowly elected to the Minnesota Senate, defeating Republican Tim Pitcher by 387 votes. He served on the Jobs and Economic Growth Finance and Policy, Transportation Finance and Policy, and Veterans and Military Affairs Finance and Policy committees.

While in the Senate, Little was involved in efforts to address the rising cost of insulin. In December 2018, he convened an informal discussion at the state Capitol with patients, advocates, and lawmakers about insulin prices and said he had drafted several proposals aimed at controlling costs, including a price cap. By January 2019, MPR News described Little as a leading Senate advocate for several proposals intended to reduce insulin costs. An insulin-assistance provision passed both legislative chambers that spring but was omitted from the final health and human services budget agreement; Little subsequently convened bipartisan negotiations over an emergency assistance program. The Legislature ultimately passed the Alec Smith Insulin Affordability Act in 2020.

Little gained national attention in 2020 for his use of the social media app TikTok. By August, the Star Tribune reported that he had accumulated more than 130,000 followers, and Politico profiled him as one of a small number of elected officials making extensive use of the platform to reach younger voters.

Little ran for reelection in 2020 but lost to Republican nominee Zach Duckworth. The contest drew substantial outside spending from both parties. In late October, the Star Tribune reported that Republican groups had spent more than $300,000 to defeat Little and DFL-aligned groups had spent more than $400,000 to support him, describing him as a leading Republican target in the fight for control of the Senate.

In 2022, Little ran for Dakota County Attorney but lost to Kathy Keena, receiving 48.06% of the vote to Keena's 51.52%.

=== 2026 congressional candidacy ===
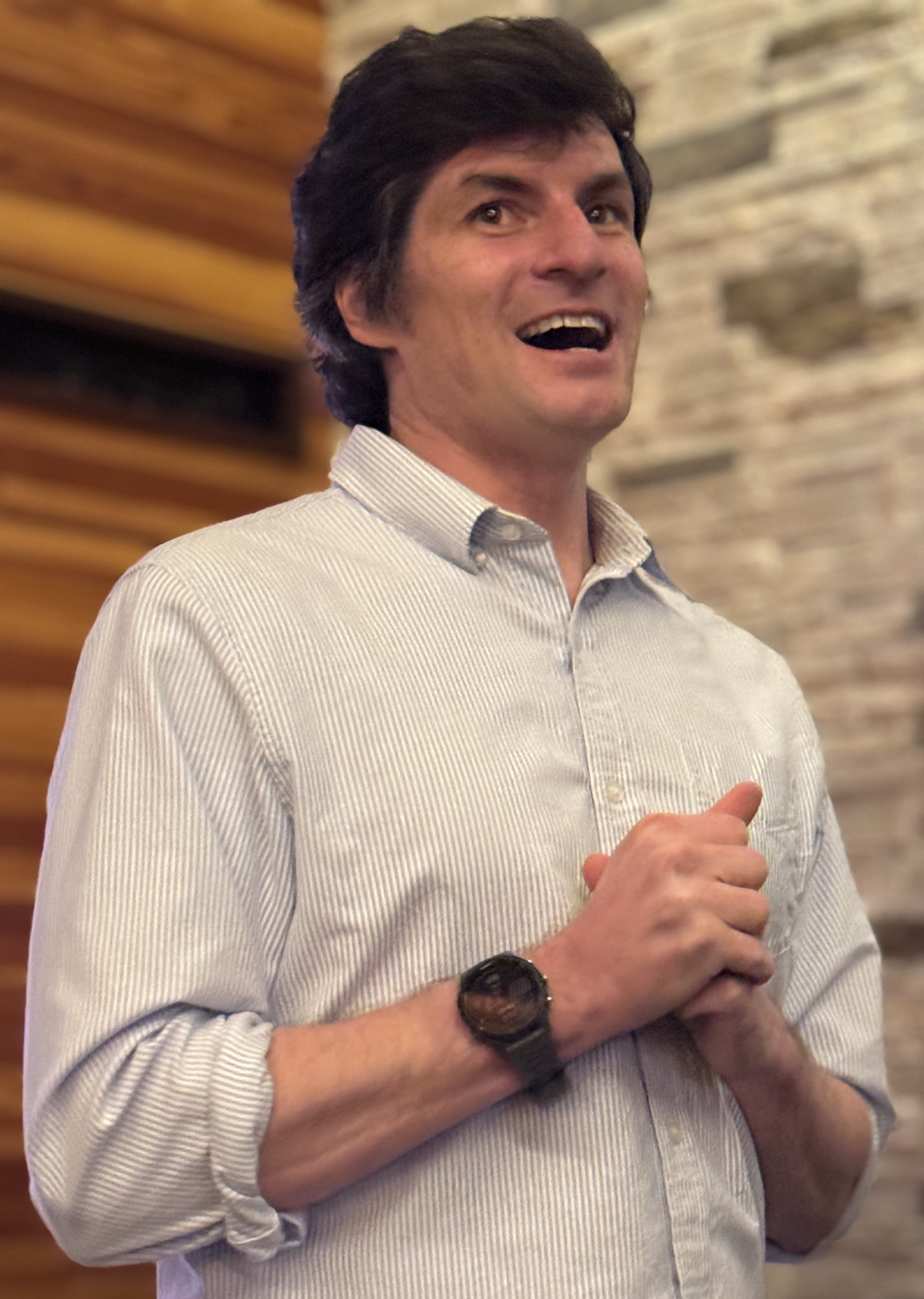
Little campaigning in 2026

On April 30, 2025, Little announced his candidacy for the U.S. House of Representatives in Minnesota's 2nd congressional district, after incumbent Angie Craig decided to run for the state's open U.S. Senate seat instead. He was the first candidate to enter the Democratic primary. He was later joined by state representative Kaela Berg and state senator Matt Klein, who became his principal rivals in the primary.

During Operation Metro Surge, Little was among Democratic candidates who participated in protests against U.S. Immigration and Customs Enforcement activity in the southern Twin Cities suburbs. In April 2026, The Intercept reported that local rapid response units opposing ICE activity were concerned that Minnesota Democrats were co-opting the movement for votes, with some activists claiming that Little had used the movement for political gain.

Little addressed the criticism during an interview with WCCO-TV, saying that his involvement in the movement was personal because his wife, a naturalized citizen and a U.S. resident since age 10, had to carry documents during Operation Metro Surge. He said: "We posted some videos to hold them accountable, but there's a whole host of stuff we were doing that we don't post about, don't talk about. It was important to be out there for my family." Later in the campaign, the Minnesota Star Tribune also reported that Little often discussed his wife's experience as an immigrant and her decision to keep her U.S. passport nearby during the federal immigration operation.

Little said he would abide by the endorsement of the Minnesota Democratic–Farmer–Labor Party and support the endorsed candidate if he were not endorsed.

In a February 2026 precinct caucus straw poll, Little received 43.29% of the vote to Klein's 20.97% and Berg's 6.68%.

On May 9, Little won the DFL endorsement at the Second Congressional District Endorsement Convention, receiving 63% of delegate votes on the first ballot, three percentage points above the threshold required for endorsement. Berg and Klein remained in the race. Although six DFL candidates appeared on the primary ballot, campaign coverage focused largely on Little, Klein, and Berg as the three leading contenders. The race was widely framed as a contest between the party's progressive and moderate wings, with Little and Berg running to Klein's left. In the final weeks, outside groups spent millions of dollars in the race; the Star Tribune reported that 314 Action had spent $2.5 million supporting Klein since July 20, while groups supporting Little had spent more than $407,000.

On August 11, Little won the primary and advanced to the general election against the Republican nominee, state senator Eric Pratt.

== Political positions ==
Little speaking in 2026

=== Immigration and Customs Enforcement (ICE) ===
During his 2026 congressional campaign, Little condemned Operation Metro Surge and called ICE agents "lawless street gangs". He advocates replacing ICE with an agency that he says would operate in accordance with the U.S. Constitution, mandating clear identification for agents, restricting the qualified immunity of federal agents by amending Section 1983 of Title 42 of the United States Code, and ensuring transparency about the location of detainees. In February 2026, the Minnesota Star Tribune reported that Little supported getting rid of ICE provided it was replaced with an immigration-enforcement organization that could build public trust. MPR News later reported that Little and Berg had publicly called for the agency's abolition. His opposition to the federal immigration operation was also a prominent part of his campaigning in the southern Twin Cities suburbs during the winter of 2026.

=== Economy ===
Little has advocated a permanent expansion of the U.S. Child Tax Credit and opposes tariffs. He has also expressed support for organized labor and collective bargaining as part of his economic platform.

Little supports the Affordable Loans for Students Act, which would cap interest rates on current and future student loans at 2%. His platform also calls for restoring loan balances to their original principal amounts, strengthening loan-servicer accountability and forgiving remaining federal student-loan balances after 20 years.

=== Health care ===
Little supports Medicare for All. During his 2026 congressional campaign, he argued that Medicare should be made available to all Americans rather than relying on further incremental changes to the existing health insurance system. The Minnesota Star Tribune described Medicare for All as one of the pillars of his campaign, and FOX 9 likewise identified the proposal as a central part of his platform.

Little has also advocated expanding the ability of Medicare and Medicaid to negotiate prescription drug prices. His congressional health-care platform cites his work on insulin affordability in the Minnesota Senate.

In March 2026, National Nurses United endorsed Little's campaign, citing his support for a health-care system providing universal coverage and identifying Medicare for All as the model it favored.

=== Israel–Palestine conflict ===
Little condemned Hamas's October 7 attacks, as well as Israel's subsequent military response, which he has called "genocidal". He has advocated ending U.S. military aid and weapons sales to Israel, permitting humanitarian aid to enter Gaza, removing illegal Israeli settlements from Palestinian territories, and establishing a two-state solution for Israel and Palestine. His call for an arms embargo became one of the distinctions between him and Klein during the closing days of the Democratic primary.

=== LGBTQ rights ===
Little has advocated passage of the Equality Act, which would prohibit discrimination on the basis of sexual orientation, gender identity, and sex; protecting Obergefell v. Hodges; and banning conversion therapy nationally. During his speech to the May 2026 DFL endorsing convention, he identified transgender rights as one of the issues on which he wanted the party to take a more assertive position.

Little opposes the Trump administration's restrictions on transgender people serving in the military. His campaign has called for reversing the policy whose enforcement the Supreme Court permitted while litigation continued in United States v. Shilling.

=== Anti-corruption ===
Little has publicly refused campaign funding from AIPAC, super PACs, health insurance PACs, and corporate PACs. A ban on corporate campaign contributions was one of the campaign positions highlighted in the Minnesota Star Tribune's coverage of the primary. Little supports overturning Citizens United v. FEC and Buckley v. Valeo to permit campaign spending limits, banning members of Congress from trading stocks, requiring presidents and close family members to divest business assets and place their value in a blind trust, and creating a pardon board for federal pardons.

Little also calls for preventing lobbyists and corporations from fundraising for federal political campaigns or donating money to government events and functions, greater disclosure of corporate and PAC campaign contributions, and a publicly financed federal campaign system.

=== Federal taxes ===
Little wants to raise the federal corporate tax rate, increase taxes on high-income earners, and eliminate the carried interest loophole. During the 2026 campaign, he called for a wealth tax; the Minnesota Star Tribune reported that he promoted the proposal in his speech to the DFL endorsing convention, while FOX 9 described taxes on the wealthy as part of his general-election platform. Little also supports raising the income cap subject to Social Security taxation to strengthen the program's finances.

=== Public safety and police ===
Little opposes reducing police staffing and has expressed concern about cybercrime, fentanyl trafficking, and human trafficking. He supports funding law-enforcement training and the Dakota County Safety and Mental Health Alternative Response Training Center, commonly known as the SMART Center. He has also argued that law-enforcement officers who use unnecessary force or violate due process should be held accountable.

== Electoral history ==
Minnesota's 58th State Senate district election, 2016
Party	Candidate	Votes	%
Democratic (DFL)	Matt Little	22,833	50.38
Republican	Tim Pitcher	22,446	49.53
Write-in		42	0.09
Majority		387	0.85
Total votes		45,321	100

Minnesota's 58th State Senate district election, 2020
Party	Candidate	Votes	%
Republican	Zach Duckworth	29,412	54.90
Democratic (DFL)	Matt Little	24,129	45.04
Write-in		31	0.06
Majority		5,283	9.86
Total votes		53,572	100

Dakota County Attorney election, 2022
Party	Candidate	Votes	%
Nonpartisan	Kathy Keena	84,519	51.52
Nonpartisan	Matt Little	78,846	48.06
Write-in		686	0.42
Majority		5,673	3.46
Total votes		164,051	100

U.S. House of Representatives
Preceded by Angie Craig	Member of the U.S. House of Representatives from Minnesota's 2nd congressional district Taking office 2027	Elect
