= List of NFL retired numbers =

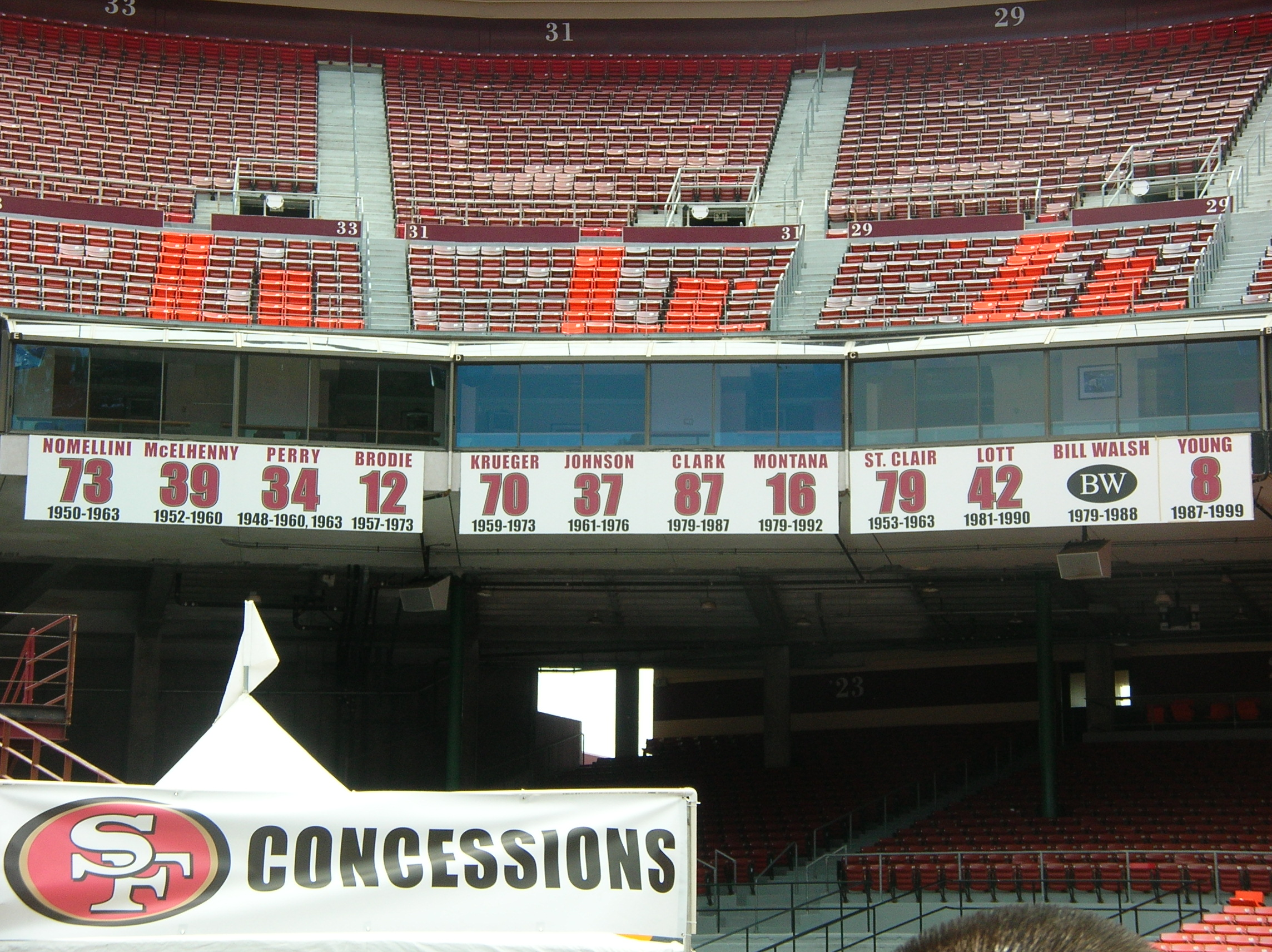
San Francisco 49ers. retired numbers displayed at Candlestick Park in June 2009

Teams in the National Football League (NFL) retire jersey numbers of players who either are considered by the team to have made significant contributions to that team's success, or who have experienced untimely deaths during their playing career. As with other leagues, once a team retires a player's jersey number, it never issues the number to any other player, unless the player or team explicitly allows it.

== History ==
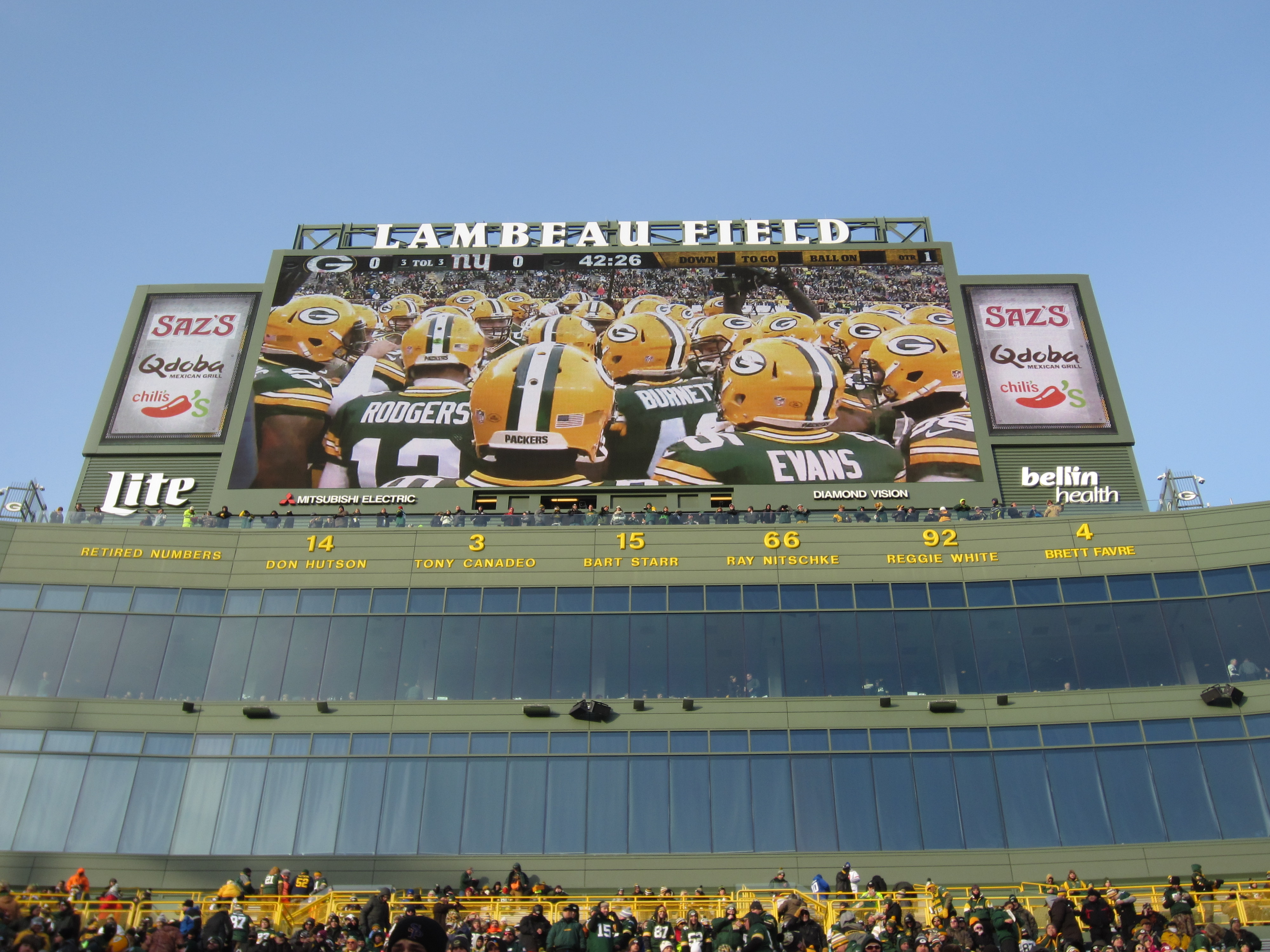
The Green Bay Packers retired numbers on display at Lambeau Field, which include Reggie White, the only NFL player to have his number retired by two teams.

Since NFL teams began retiring numbers, 163 players have had their jersey number retired. The Chicago Bears and the New York Giants have the most retired numbers of the teams with 14 each.

Reggie White is the only player whose number was retired by two teams (the Green Bay Packers and Philadelphia Eagles). While Peyton Manning's number is only officially retired by the Indianapolis Colts, he received an acknowledgment when the Denver Broncos re-retired the number 18, which is officially retired under the name of Frank Tripucka (Tripucka granted Manning permission to wear the number). The Atlanta Falcons, Dallas Cowboys, and Las Vegas Raiders traditionally do not retire jersey numbers. The Bears announced in 2013 that Mike Ditka's number would be the last that they retire. The New Orleans Saints previously retired numbers, having done so for Jim Taylor and Doug Atkins, but under new ownership those numbers were unretired. (Note: While not officially retired, Archie Manning's No. 8 and Drew Brees' No. 9 have not been reissued by the team.) Also without a retired jersey number are the Baltimore Ravens and the Houston Texans, though these teams are less than 30 years old: in this regard, the Texans do not retire numbers but honor player jerseys instead.

The Buffalo Bills under previous owner Ralph Wilson also did not retire jersey numbers, with the exception of Jim Kelly. This policy was reversed under Wilson's successor Terry Pegula.

Unlike Major League Baseball (which retired Jackie Robinson's number 42 in 1997), the National Hockey League (which retired Wayne Gretzky's 99 in 2000), and the National Basketball Association (which retired Bill Russell's 6 in 2022), the NFL has never retired a jersey number league-wide in honor of anyone.

The number 00 is no longer allowed, but was not retired in honor of any particular player; rather, the NFL's positional numbering system, instituted in 1973, does not allocate a position for players wearing that number. The NFL allowed 00 in the past, with Steve Bagarus, Jim Otto, and Ken Burrough being the only three players to have ever worn it. The number can be, and rarely is, used in the preseason when no other numbers for a player's position are available.

The Seattle Seahawks are the only NFL team to have retired a number for reasons other than honoring an individual player, having retired the number 12 in 1984 in honor of their fan base, who are collectively nicknamed the 12s, as they are the "twelfth man" on the field. Only one player in Seahawks history has ever donned a #12 jersey in the regular season: backup quarterback Sam Adkins, who appeared in 11 games between 1977 and 1981.

== Retired numbers ==
Pro Football Hall of Fame member

Number set to be retired

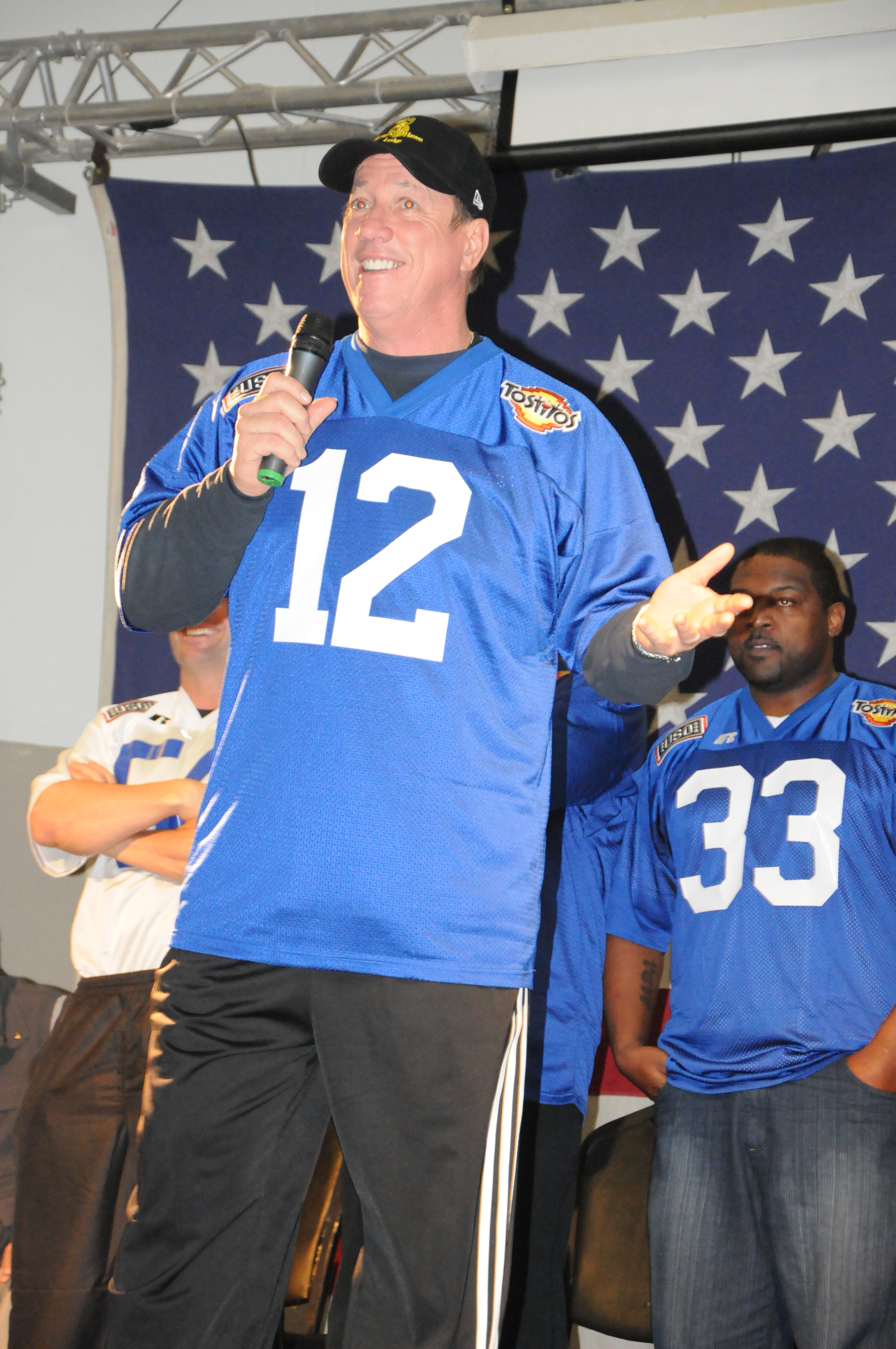
Jim Kelly, the first player to have his jersey number (12) officially retired by the Buffalo Bills, is seen here in 2010

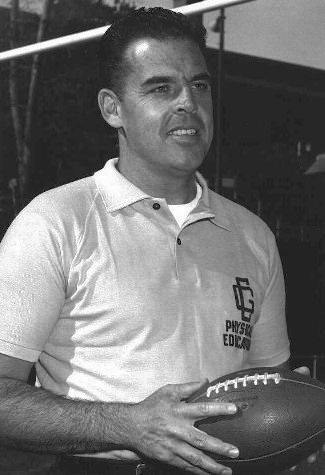
Otto Graham, whose number 14 was retired by the Browns, at his new job, as the U.S. Coast Guard Academy Athletic Director in 1959

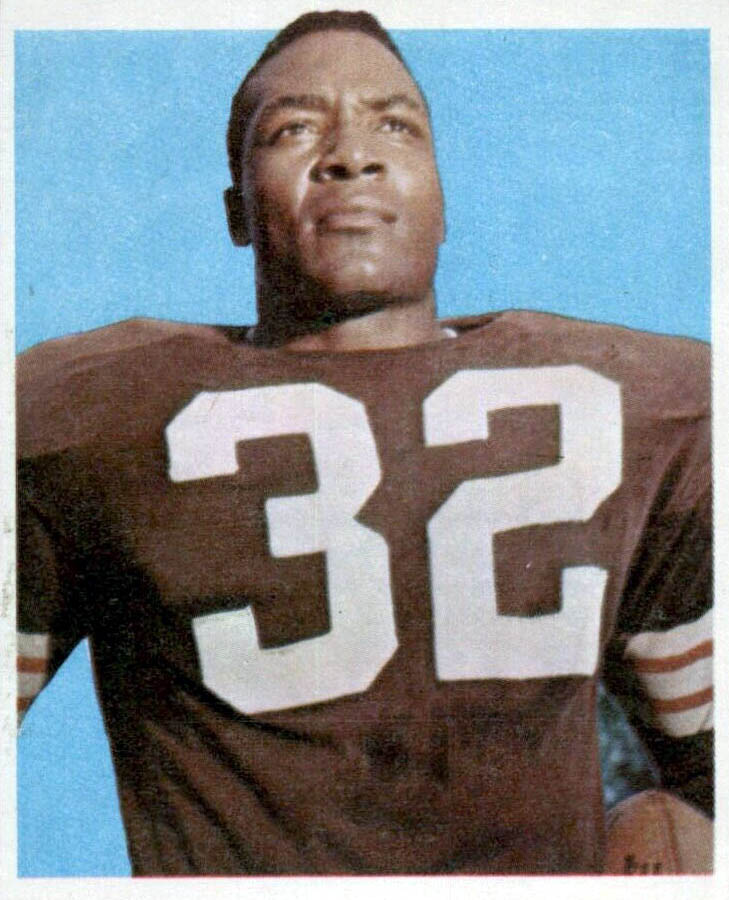
Jim Brown's #32 was retired by the Browns after his 9-years tenure on the franchise

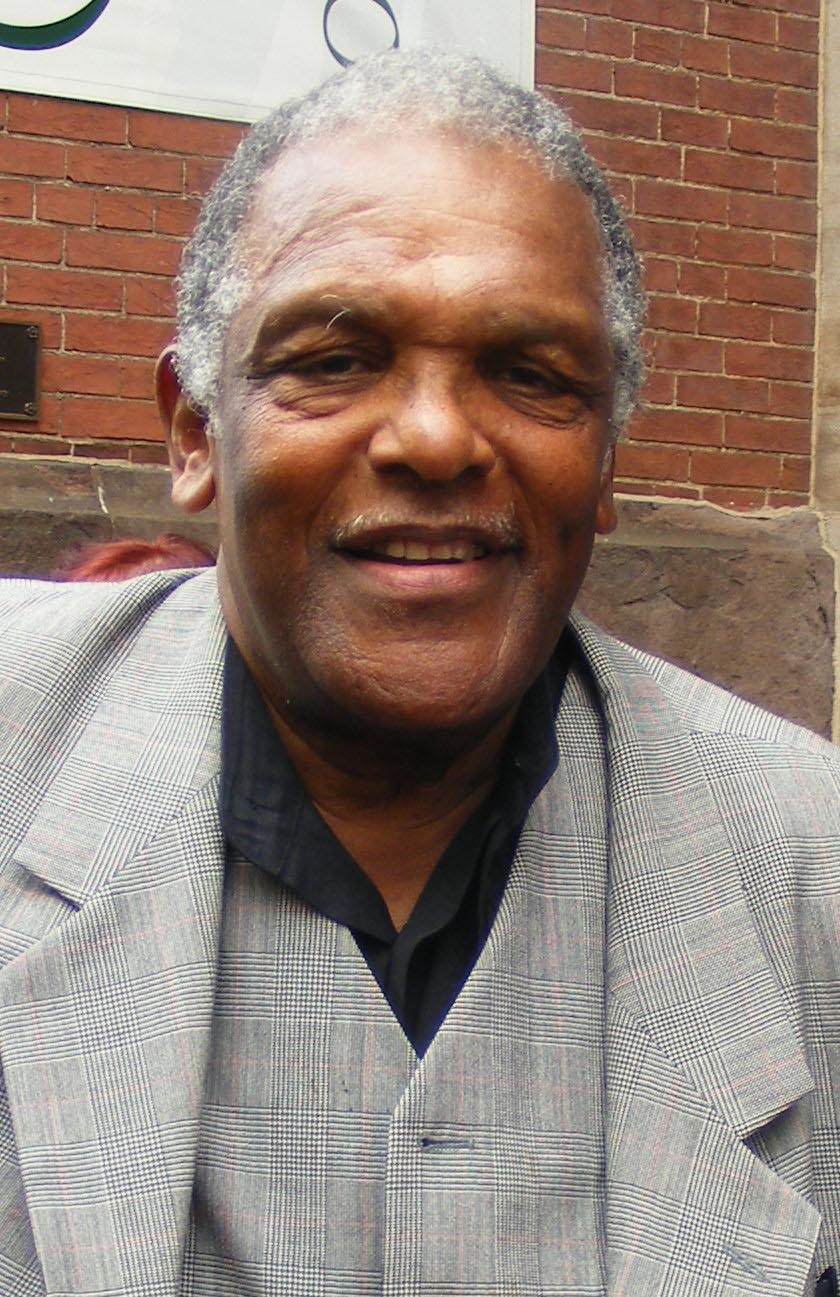
Lenny Moore, whose number 24 was retired by the Colts, poses for a picture at Baltimore in 2011

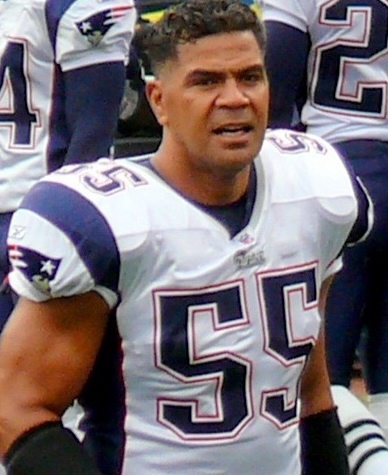
Junior Seau, whose number 55 was retired by the Chargers, in 2008 playing a game with the New England Patriots

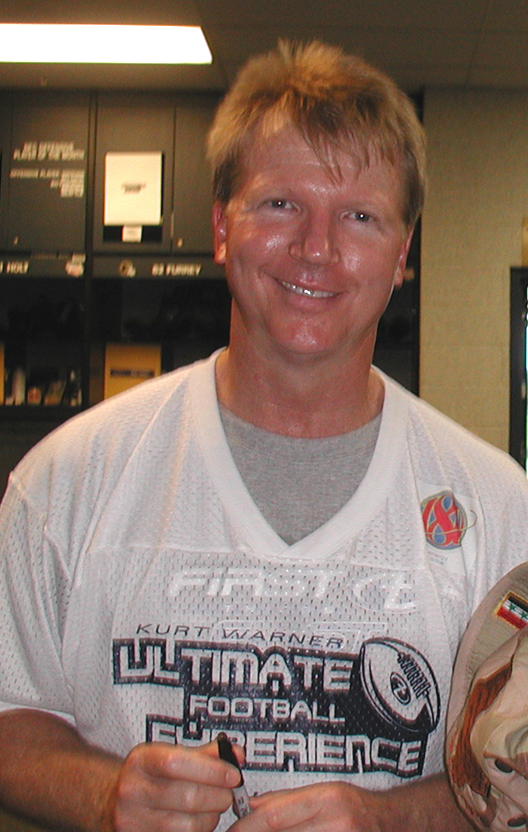
Phil Simms, whose number 11 was retired by the Giants, signing autographs at Rams Park in 2003

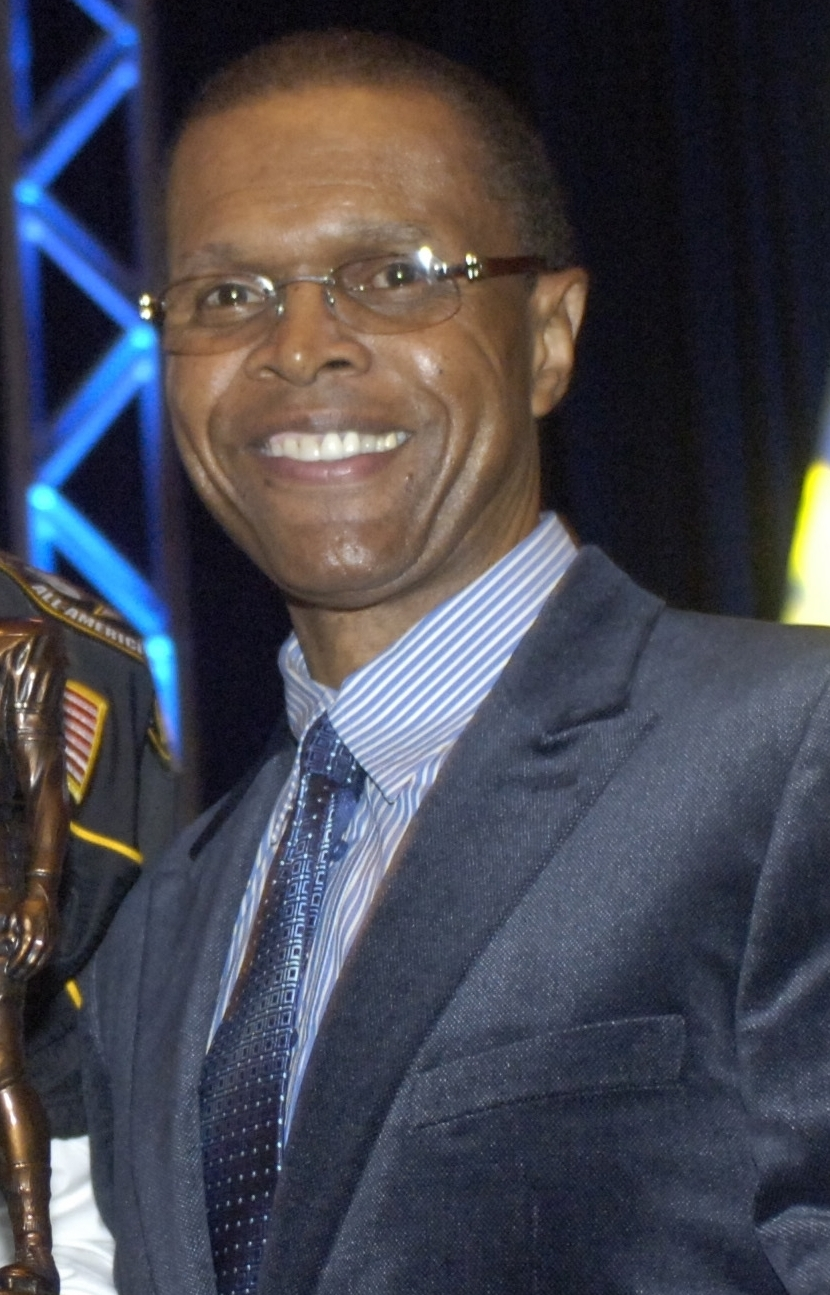
Gale Sayers, whose number 40 was retired by the Bears, giving a keynote speech at an awards ceremony in 2008 for the U.S. Army High School Football Player of the Year award

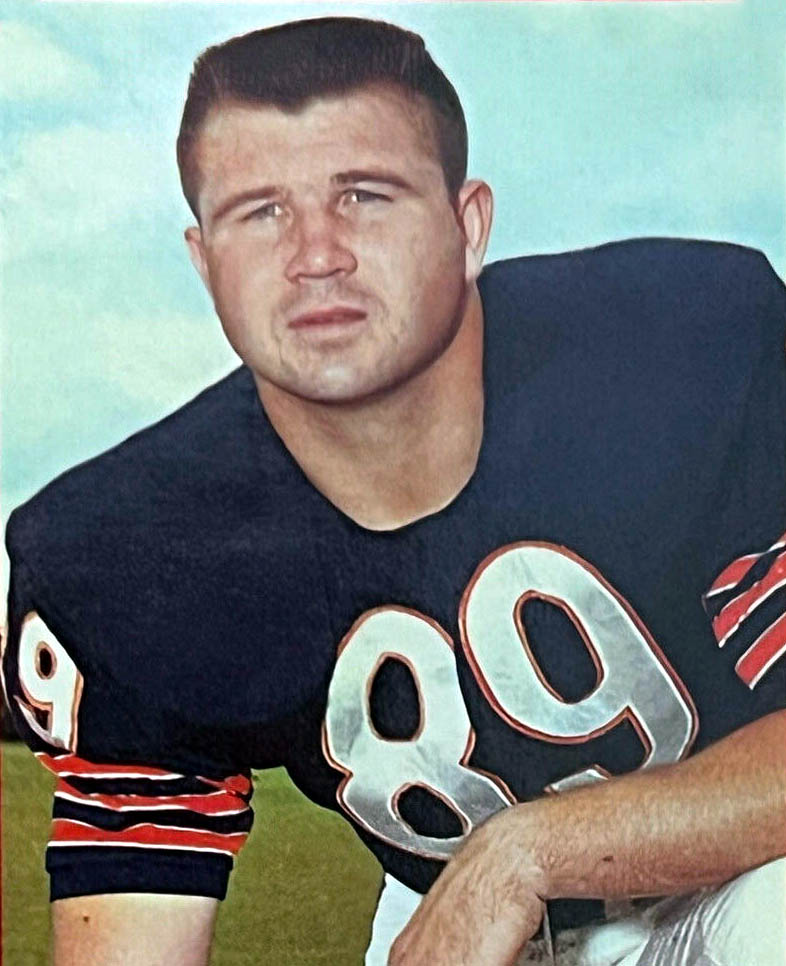
Mike Ditka, whose number 89 was retired by the Bears in a Monday night game against the Dallas Cowboys

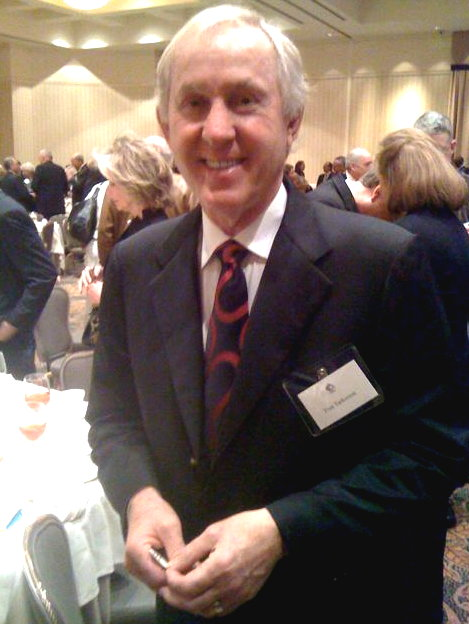
Fran Tarkenton, whose number 10 was retired by the Vikings, after giving a speech at Atlanta in 2010

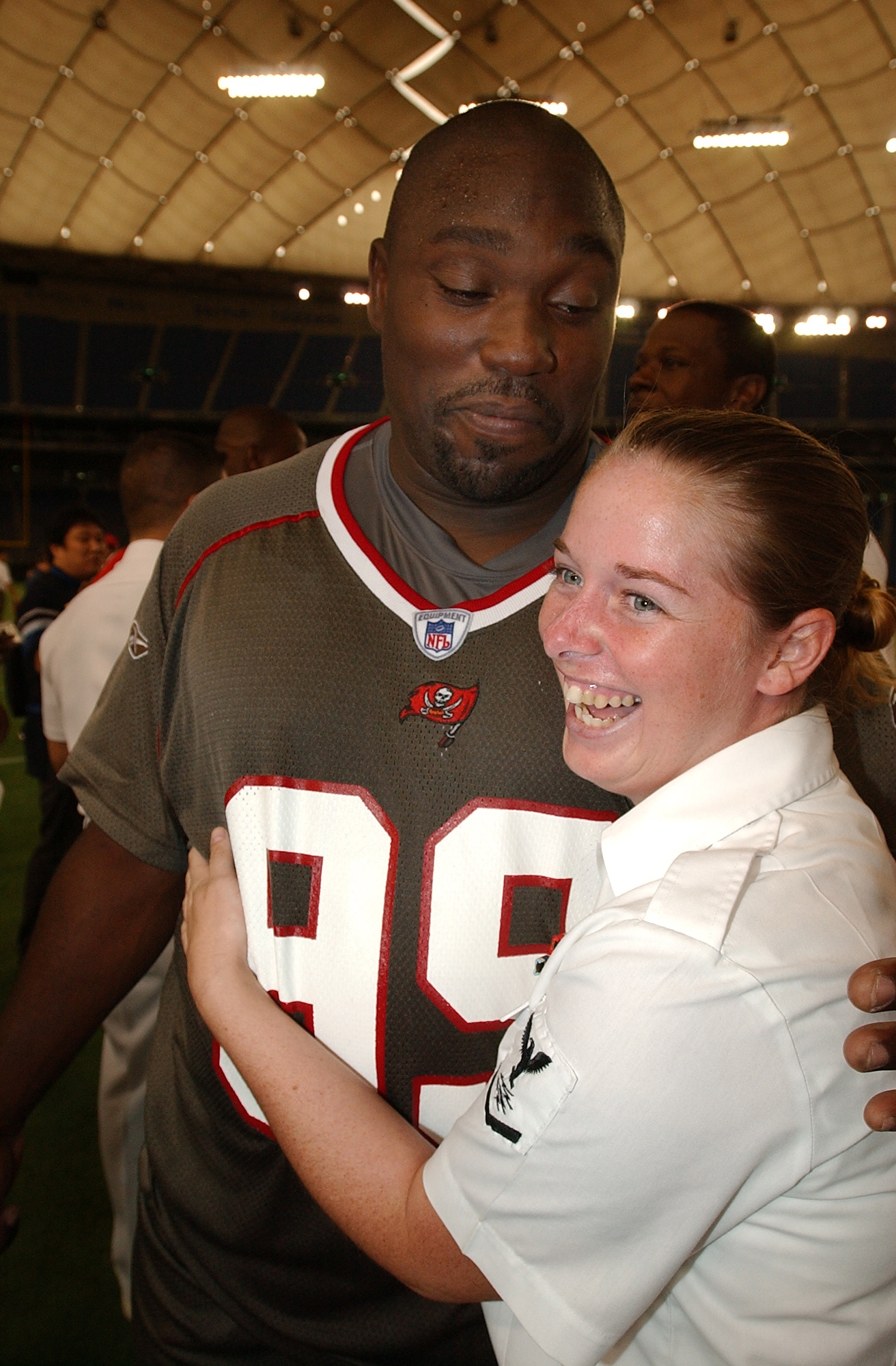
Warren Sapp (left), whose number 99 was retired by the Buccaneers, visits members of the US Navy in 2003

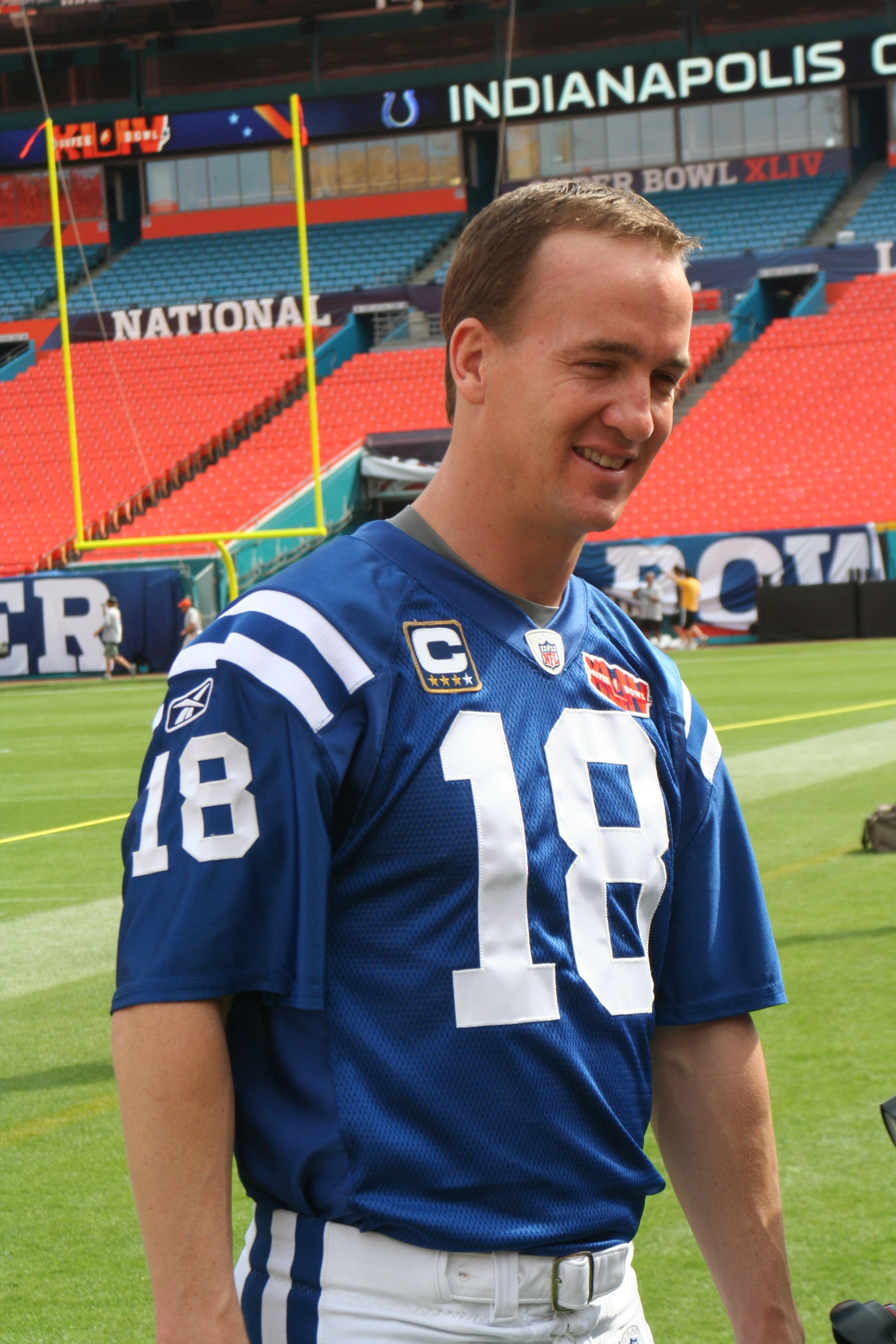
Peyton Manning's number 18 was retired by the Colts in 2017

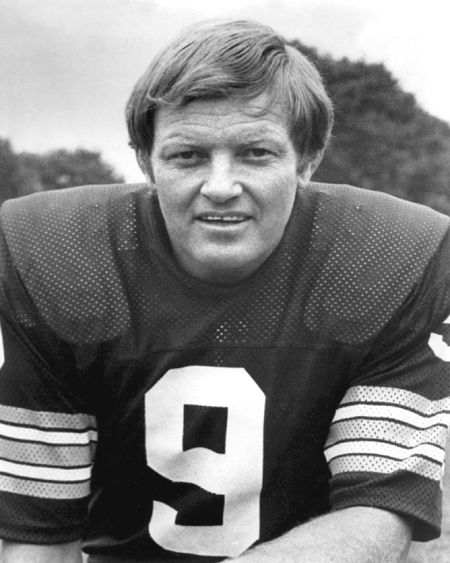
Sonny Jurgensen's number 9 was retired by the Washington Commanders in 2022

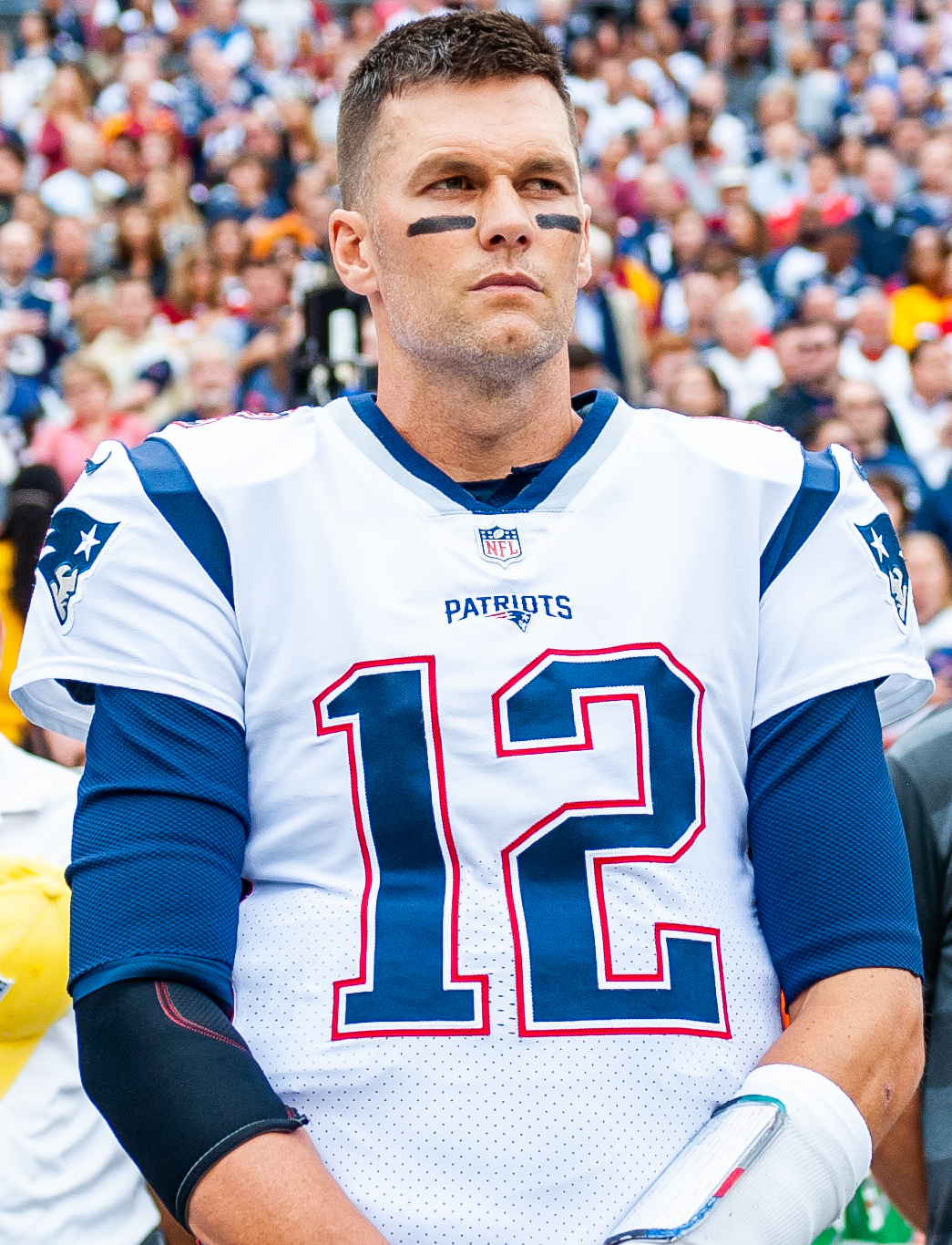
Tom Brady's number 12 was retired by the New England Patriots in 2024, in front of a crowd of 60,000 fans attending his Patriots Hall of Fame induction ceremony

Player	No.	Team	Tenure	Year retired	Refs.
Larry Wilson	8	Arizona Cardinals	1960–1972	1970	
Larry Fitzgerald	11	Arizona Cardinals	2004–2020	2026	
Pat Tillman	40	Arizona Cardinals	1998–2001	2004	
Stan Mauldin	77	Arizona Cardinals	1946–1948	1948	
J. V. Cain	88	Arizona Cardinals	1974–1978	1979	
Marshall Goldberg (Note: No. 99 was re-issued to J. J. Watt after Goldberg's daughter gave her blessing for Watt to wear it on March 2, 2021. Watt wore No. 99 for the 2021 and 2022 seasons until his retirement.)	99	Arizona Cardinals	1939–1943, 1946–1948	1948	
Jim Kelly	12	Buffalo Bills	1986–1996	2001	
Thurman Thomas	34	Buffalo Bills	1988–1999	2018	
Bruce Smith	78	Buffalo Bills	1985–1999	2016	
Andre Reed	83	Buffalo Bills	1985–1999	2027	
Sam Mills	51	Carolina Panthers	1995–1997	2005	
Bronko Nagurski	3	Chicago Bears	1930–1937, 1943	1949	
George McAfee	5	Chicago Bears	1940–1941, 1945–1950	1955	
George Halas	7	Chicago Bears	1920–1928		
Willie Galimore	28	Chicago Bears	1957–1963		
Walter Payton	34	Chicago Bears	1975–1987	1987	
Gale Sayers	40	Chicago Bears	1965–1971	1994	
Brian Piccolo	41	Chicago Bears	1965–1969	1970	
Sid Luckman	42	Chicago Bears	1939–1950		
Dick Butkus	51	Chicago Bears	1965–1973	1994	
Bill Hewitt	56	Chicago Bears	1932–1936	1949	
Bill George	61	Chicago Bears	1952–1965		
Bulldog Turner	66	Chicago Bears	1940–1952	1963	
Red Grange	77	Chicago Bears	1925–1934	1949	
Mike Ditka	89	Chicago Bears	1961–1966	2013	
Bob Johnson	54	Cincinnati Bengals	1968–1979	1978	
Otto Graham	14	Cleveland Browns	1946–1955		
Jim Brown	32	Cleveland Browns	1957–1965		
Ernie Davis	45	Cleveland Browns	1962 (Note: Davis was diagnosed with leukemia that same year, and died shortly after at age 23 without ever playing in a professional game.)	1963	
Don Fleming	46	Cleveland Browns	1960–1962		
Lou Groza	76	Cleveland Browns	1946–1959, 1961–1967	1968	
John Elway	7	Denver Broncos	1983–1998	1999	
Frank Tripucka (Note: No. 18 was re-issued for Peyton Manning after Tripucka gave his approval; it was used by Manning from the 2012 season until his retirement after the 2015 season. Manning's name was added to the retired number's banner as an honorable mention.)	18	Denver Broncos	1960–1963	1963	
Floyd Little	44	Denver Broncos	1967–1975	1984	
Dutch Clark	7	Detroit Lions	1931–1932, 1934–1938	1939	
Lem Barney	20	Detroit Lions	1967–1977	2004	
Barry Sanders	20	Detroit Lions	1989–1998	2004	
Billy Sims	20	Detroit Lions	1980–1984	2004	
Bobby Layne	22	Detroit Lions	1950–1958		
Doak Walker	37	Detroit Lions	1950–1955	1955	
Joe Schmidt	56	Detroit Lions	1953–1965		
Chuck Hughes	85	Detroit Lions	1970–1971		
Tony Canadeo	3	Green Bay Packers	1941–1952	1952	
Brett Favre	4	Green Bay Packers	1992–2007	2015	
Don Hutson	14	Green Bay Packers	1935–1945	1951	
Bart Starr	15	Green Bay Packers	1956–1971	1973	
Ray Nitschke	66	Green Bay Packers	1958–1972	1983	
Reggie White	92	Green Bay Packers	1993–1998	1999	
Peyton Manning	18	Indianapolis Colts	1998–2011	2017	
Johnny Unitas	19	Indianapolis Colts	1956–1972		
Buddy Young	22	Indianapolis Colts	1953–1955		
Lenny Moore	24	Indianapolis Colts	1956–1967	1968	
Art Donovan	70	Indianapolis Colts	1953–1961	1962	
Jim Parker	77	Indianapolis Colts	1957–1967		
Raymond Berry	82	Indianapolis Colts	1955–1967		
Gino Marchetti	89	Indianapolis Colts	1953–1966		
Tony Boselli	71	Jacksonville Jaguars	1995–2001	2022	
Jan Stenerud	3	Kansas City Chiefs	1967–1979	1992	
Len Dawson	16	Kansas City Chiefs	1962–1975		
Emmitt Thomas	18	Kansas City Chiefs	1966–1978	2008	
Abner Haynes	28	Kansas City Chiefs	1960–1964		
Stone Johnson	33	Kansas City Chiefs	1963 (Note: On August 30, 1963, he suffered a fractured vertebra in his neck in a preseason game against the Houston Oilers in during a kickoff return. He died 10 days later, on September 8, at the age of 23. He was only on the team's active roster during preseason.)	1963	
Mack Lee Hill	36	Kansas City Chiefs	1964–1965		
Derrick Thomas	58	Kansas City Chiefs	1989–1999	2009	
Willie Lanier	63	Kansas City Chiefs	1967–1977	1992	
Bobby Bell	78	Kansas City Chiefs	1963–1974	1984	
Buck Buchanan	86	Kansas City Chiefs	1963–1975	1992	
Dan Fouts	14	Los Angeles Chargers (Note: Pro Football Hall of Fame offensive tackle Ron Mix in 1969 was the first Charger to have his number retired (#74) after he announced he was quitting football. However, he came out of retirement in 1971 to play for the Oakland Raiders. Then-Chargers owner Gene Klein, who hated the Raiders, unretired Mix's #74.)	1973–1987	1988	
Charlie Joiner	18	Los Angeles Chargers	1976–1986	2023	
Lance Alworth	19	Los Angeles Chargers	1962–1970	2005	
LaDainian Tomlinson	21	Los Angeles Chargers	2001–2009	2015	
Junior Seau	55	Los Angeles Chargers	1990–2002	2012	
Kellen Winslow	80	Los Angeles Chargers	1979–1987	2023	
Bob Waterfield	7	Los Angeles Rams	1945–1952	1952	
Marshall Faulk	28	Los Angeles Rams	1999–2006	2007	
Eric Dickerson	29	Los Angeles Rams	1983–1987		
Merlin Olsen	74	Los Angeles Rams	1962–1976		
Deacon Jones	75	Los Angeles Rams	1961–1971	2009	
Jackie Slater	78	Los Angeles Rams	1976–1995	1996	
Isaac Bruce	80	Los Angeles Rams	1994–2007	2010	
Jack Youngblood	85	Los Angeles Rams	1971–1984		
Bob Griese	12	Miami Dolphins	1967–1980	1985	
Dan Marino	13	Miami Dolphins	1983–1999	2000	
Larry Csonka	39	Miami Dolphins	1968–1974, 1979	2002	
Fran Tarkenton	10	Minnesota Vikings	1961–1966, 1972–1978	1979	
Mick Tingelhoff	53	Minnesota Vikings	1962–1978	2001	
Jim Marshall	70	Minnesota Vikings	1961–1979	1999	
Korey Stringer	77	Minnesota Vikings	1995–2000	2001	
Cris Carter	80	Minnesota Vikings	1990–2001	2003	
Alan Page	88	Minnesota Vikings	1967–1978	1988	
Tom Brady	12	New England Patriots	2000–2019	2024	
Gino Cappelletti	20	New England Patriots	1960–1970		
Mike Haynes	40	New England Patriots	1976–1982		
Steve Nelson	57	New England Patriots	1974–1987	1988	
John Hannah	73	New England Patriots	1973–1985		
Bruce Armstrong	78	New England Patriots	1987–2000	2000	
Jim Lee Hunt	79	New England Patriots	1960–1970		
Bob Dee	89	New England Patriots	1960–1967		
Ray Flaherty (Note: Malik Nabers is currently wearing No. 1 for the Giants, as the Flaherty family gave him permission to do so prior to the 2024 season.)	1	New York Giants	1928–1935	1935	
Tuffy Leemans	4	New York Giants	1936–1943	1940	
Mel Hein	7	New York Giants	1931–1945	1963	
Eli Manning	10	New York Giants	2004–2019	2021	
Phil Simms	11	New York Giants	1979–1993	1995	
Ward Cuff	14	New York Giants	1937–1945	1946	
Y. A. Tittle	14	New York Giants	1961–1964	1965	
Frank Gifford	16	New York Giants	1952–1964	2000	
Al Blozis	32	New York Giants	1942–1944	1945	
Joe Morrison	40	New York Giants	1959–1972	1973	
Charlie Conerly	42	New York Giants	1948–1961	1962	
Ken Strong	50	New York Giants	1936–1947	1968	
Lawrence Taylor	56	New York Giants	1981–1993	1994	
Michael Strahan	92	New York Giants	1993–2007	2021	
Joe Namath	12	New York Jets	1965–1976	1985	
Don Maynard	13	New York Jets	1960–1972		
Curtis Martin	28	New York Jets	1998–2005	2012	
Joe Klecko	73	New York Jets	1977–1987	2004	
Dennis Byrd	90	New York Jets	1989–1992	2012	
Weeb Ewbank	Jacket	New York Jets	1963–1973		
Donovan McNabb	5	Philadelphia Eagles	1999–2009	2013	
Steve Van Buren	15	Philadelphia Eagles	1944–1951	1951	
Brian Dawkins	20	Philadelphia Eagles	1996–2008	2012	
Tom Brookshier	40	Philadelphia Eagles	1953–1961	1962	
Pete Retzlaff	44	Philadelphia Eagles	1956–1966	1965	
Chuck Bednarik	60	Philadelphia Eagles	1949–1962		
Al Wistert	70	Philadelphia Eagles	1944–1951	1952	
Reggie White	92	Philadelphia Eagles	1985–1992	2005	
Jerome Brown	99	Philadelphia Eagles	1987–1991	1992	
Franco Harris	32	Pittsburgh Steelers	1972–1983	2022	
Ernie Stautner	70	Pittsburgh Steelers	1950–1963	1964	
Joe Greene	75	Pittsburgh Steelers	1969–1981	2014	
Steve Young	8	San Francisco 49ers	1987–1999	2008	
John Brodie (Note: During his tenure with the 49ers from 2006 to 2007, quarterback Trent Dilfer, a long-time friend of Brodie, wore No. 12 with his permission, unofficially unretiring the number as a tribute.)	12	San Francisco 49ers	1957–1973	1973	
Joe Montana	16	San Francisco 49ers	1979–1992	1997	
Joe Perry	34	San Francisco 49ers	1948–1960	1971	
Jimmy Johnson	37	San Francisco 49ers	1961–1976	1977	
Hugh McElhenny	39	San Francisco 49ers	1952–1960	1971	
Ronnie Lott	42	San Francisco 49ers	1981–1990	2003	
Charlie Krueger	70	San Francisco 49ers	1959–1973	1974	
Leo Nomellini	73	San Francisco 49ers	1950–1963	1971	
Bob St. Clair	79	San Francisco 49ers	1953–1963	2001	
Jerry Rice	80	San Francisco 49ers	1985–2000	2010	
Dwight Clark	87	San Francisco 49ers	1979–1987	1988	
Kenny Easley	45	Seattle Seahawks	1981–1987	2017	
Walter Jones	71	Seattle Seahawks	1997–2009	2010	
Steve Largent (Note: Jerry Rice wore No. 80 for his 2004 stint with the Seahawks. According to Rice, the team offered him the jersey number, with Largent's permission.)	80	Seattle Seahawks	1976–1989	1992	
Cortez Kennedy	96	Seattle Seahawks	1990–2000	2012	
FAN (12s)	12	Seattle Seahawks	–	1984	
Derrick Brooks	55	Tampa Bay Buccaneers	1995–2008	2014	
Lee Roy Selmon	63	Tampa Bay Buccaneers	1976–1984	1986	
Warren Sapp	99	Tampa Bay Buccaneers	1995–2003	2013	
Warren Moon (Note: Cam Ward is currently wearing No. 1, having received approval from Moon prior to the 2025 season.)	1	Tennessee Titans	1984–1993	2006	
Steve McNair	9	Tennessee Titans	1995–2005	2019	
Eddie George	27	Tennessee Titans	1996–2003	2019	
Earl Campbell	34	Tennessee Titans	1978–1984	1987	
Jim Norton	43	Tennessee Titans	1960–1968	1968	
Mike Munchak	63	Tennessee Titans	1982–1993	1996	
Elvin Bethea	65	Tennessee Titans	1968–1983	1983	
Bruce Matthews	74	Tennessee Titans	1983–2001	2002	
Sonny Jurgensen	9	Washington Commanders	1964–1974	2022	
Sean Taylor	21	Washington Commanders	2004–2007	2021	
Darrell Green	28	Washington Commanders	1983–2002	2024	
Sammy Baugh	33	Washington Commanders	1937–1952	1953	
John Riggins	44	Washington Commanders	1976–1985	2026	
Bobby Mitchell	49	Washington Commanders	1962–1968	2020	
Art Monk	81	Washington Commanders	1980–1993	2025	

== See also ==
- List of Green Bay Packers retired numbers
- Los Angeles Chargers retired numbers
- List of San Francisco 49ers retired numbers
- List of NCAA football retired numbers
