= Zach Duckworth =

American politician

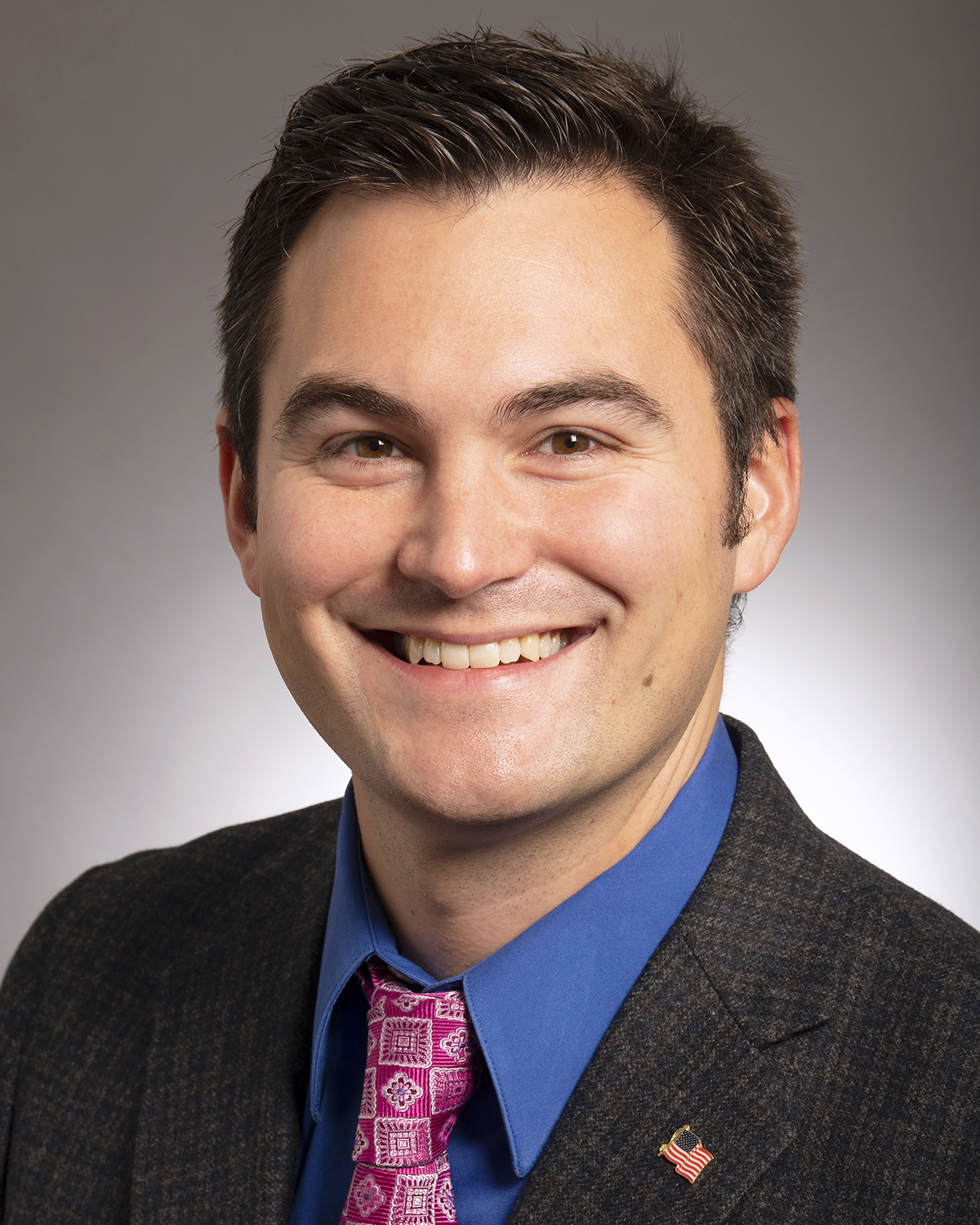
- Official portrait, 2020

Member of the Minnesota Senate
- Incumbent
- Assumed office January 5, 2021
- Preceded by: Matt Little
- Constituency: District 57 (2023–present); District 58 (2021–2023)

Personal details
- Born: July 1, 1987 (age 39)
- Party: Republican
- Education: University of St. Thomas (BA, MBA)

Zach Duckworth (born July 1, 1987) is an American politician and member of the Minnesota Senate. A Republican, he represents District 57 in the southern Twin Cities metropolitan area.

== Early life, education, and career ==
Duckworth was born in Lakeville and graduated from Lakeville High School. He earned a BA and MBA from the University of Saint Thomas.

== Minnesota Senate ==
Duckworth was elected to the Minnesota Senate in 2020, defeating Democratic-Farmer-Labor incumbent Matt Little. Duckworth has sat on the Senate housing, education, veterans, and metropolitan government committees, and served as an assistant majority leader. He opposes 2026 Minnesota Amendment 1.

== Electoral history ==
2020 Election for Minnesota's 58th Senate District
Party	Candidate	Votes	%
Republican	Zach Duckworth	29,412	54.90%
Democratic (DFL)	Matt Little	24,129	45.04%
n/a	Write-ins	31	0.06%
Majority		—	—
Republican gain from Democratic (DFL)
