= Clem Daniels =

American football player (1937–2019)

- Daniels in 1962

No. 36, 35, 33
- Position: Halfback

Personal information
- Born: July 9, 1937; McKinney, Texas, U.S.
- Died: March 23, 2019 (aged 81); Oakland, California, U.S.
- Listed height: 6 ft 1 in (1.85 m)
- Listed weight: 220 lb (100 kg)

Career information
- High school: Edward Sewell Daly (McKinney)
- College: Prairie View A&M (1956–1959)
- AFL draft: 1960: undrafted

Career history
- Dallas Texans (1960); Oakland Raiders (1961–1967); San Francisco 49ers (1968)

Awards and highlights
- AFL champion (1967); AFL Most Valuable Player (1963); 2× First-team All-AFL (1963, 1966); 2× Second-team All-AFL (1964, 1965); 4× AFL All-Star (1963–1966); AFL rushing yards leader (1963); AFL All-Time Team

Career AFL/NFL statistics
- Rushing yards: 5,138
- Rushing average: 4.5
- Rushing touchdowns: 30
- Receptions: 203
- Receiving yards: 3,314
- Receiving touchdowns: 24
- Stats at Pro Football Reference

Clemon Daniels Jr. (July 9, 1937 – March 23, 2019) was an American professional football player who was a halfback in the American Football League (AFL) and National Football League (NFL). He played college football for the Prairie View A&M Panthers.

== College career ==
Daniels attended Doty High School, an all-black school in McKinney, Texas. His mother worked as a housekeeper to a bank chairman but one moment that stuck with Daniels was after a celebration of his scholarship offer to Prairie View A&M University. She told him that the next time he came by the chairman's house, he was to come through the back door.

At Prairie View A&M University, he was voted to All-Conference honors during his sophomore and junior years, and he captained the NAIA National Football Championship team in his senior year.

He also completed the Army Reserve Officer Training Corps (ROTC) Program at Prairie View A&M, later being a commissioned officer in the United States Army Reserve.

== Professional career ==
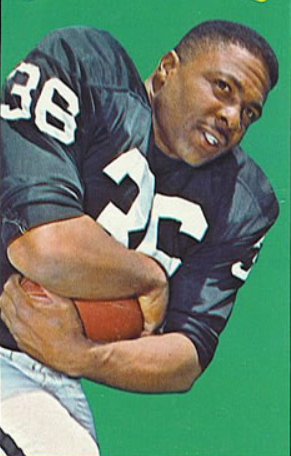
Clem Daniels in 1965

Daniels was signed as a free agent in 1960 by the AFL's Dallas Texans, who, like other AFL teams recruited players from small and predominantly black colleges, following the lead of the NFL which had been drafting HBCU schools since 1950. He was on the Texans' roster for 14 games in 1960, but saw little playing time behind Abner Haynes. He saw a handful of returns while also playing the defensive side of the ball. In his first game against the Oakland Raiders on September 16, he recorded an interception for his very first statistic. He recorded two more interceptions on the year while returning nine kicks for 162 yards.

In 1961, he was traded to the AFL's Oakland Raiders, and spent seven years there. He was given a varying level of touches that year. He scored his first touchdown against Buffalo on December 3. In total, he ran for 154 yards on 31 carries for two touchdowns. On opening day against the New York Titans on September 9, 1962, Daniels had his first 100-yard game in a 28–17 loss, doing so on 10 carries. He got his first multi-touchdown game on November 4 with two rushing touchdowns against the Titans. He topped that performance on December 9 with a 187-yard performance for 20 carries and a touchdown in a 32–17 loss. He ran for 766 yards on the season on 161 carries with eight touchdowns (seven rushing). Daniels and the Raiders improved greatly in 1963, the first of four straight American Football League All-Star seasons for him. During the year, he made his opposition known to playing a preseason game in Mobile, Alabama. The result was that the game was played in Oakland instead. Daniels had rushed for less than 200 yards combined in his first five games, but he went off against the New York Jets with a 200-yard performance that saw him score twice on 27 carries while also catching a pass for 56 yards for another touchdown in a 49–26 win. He had three more 100-yard rushing games to finish the year with 1,098 yards while scoring three rushing touchdowns and five touchdown receptions. He led the league in rushing yards along with yards per game (78.5), scrimmage yards (1,785), and with his 685 yards receiving on 30 catches also led in yards per reception (22.8). His final rush of the season gave him the AFL record for a season, which stood until 1965. Daniels was one of three players named MVP of the AFL, as Associated Press, UPI, and The Sporting News each selected a different player: Lance Alworth was named the UPI MVP while AP named Tobin Rote and Daniels was named the Sporting News American Football League Player of the Year.

Daniels regressed the following year, which notably saw him rush for -1 yard on opening day against Boston. However, he ran for 824 yards on 173 carries with two touchdowns while catching 42 passes for 696 yards with six touchdowns. The following year, he ran for 884 yards on 219 carries for five touchdowns while also catching 36 passes for 568 yards with seven touchdowns. In the All-Star Game that year that was targeted for play in January 1965, Daniels served as a key voice in a boycott called by him and other fellow black players from playing the game in New Orleans due to discrimination, such as being refused service by a number of New Orleans hotels and businesses. The game was successfully moved to Houston. Daniels ran for 801 yards on 204 carries in 1966 while scoring ten total touchdowns in his final All-Star selected year; in back-to-back weeks (October 30, November 6), he scored three touchdowns each. Daniels ran for 575 yards on 130 carries with four touchdowns before he broke his leg in the November 23 game against the Kansas City Chiefs. He missed the rest of the season, which saw the Raiders go all the way to Super Bowl II. Daniels played sparingly in the 1968 season with the San Francisco 49ers, running for just 37 yards on 12 carries. He caught two passes for 23 yards in what became his final season.

== Post-playing career ==
Daniels had spent his off-seasons teaching high school students in Oakland, CA at Skyline High School. Daniels bought his first Liquor Store in 1967. He soon became a member of the California State Packing Store and Tavern Owners Association (CAL-PAC). He later became president of the organization during a conflict with Huey Newton and the Black Panthers. Conversations with Newton eventually led to a CAL-PAC scholarship program for high school students in the Bay Area.

== Legacy ==
Daniels retired as the all-time leading rusher in the American Football League with 5,138 yards. He was selected to the All-Time All-AFL Team. He was the all-time leading rusher for the Raiders until he was passed by Mark van Eeghen over a decade after his retirement. Only two players have passed Daniels since then in Marcus Allen and Josh Jacobs.

Daniels was voted into the Prairie View A&M University Sports Hall of Fame in 1989 and the California Black Athletic Hall of Fame in 1993. He was inducted into the Texas Football Hall of Fame in 1999. Ron Wolf called Daniels “without doubt, the best halfback in the American Football League during his time...The thing that made Clem so good was his overall athletic ability. He ran a 4.6-40 in full gear, which was amazing for a guy his size.
