= Julie Sandstede =

American politician

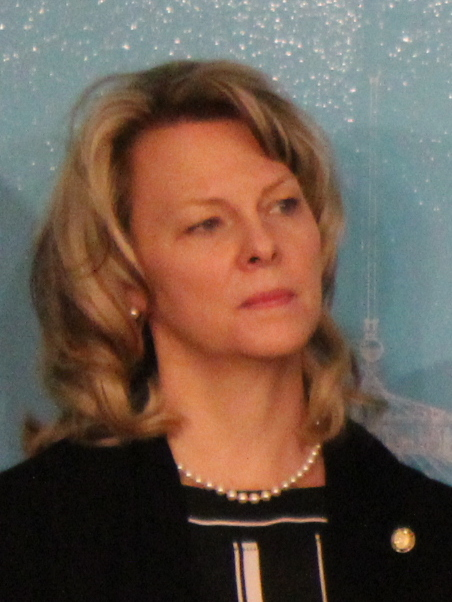

Member of the Minnesota House of Representatives from the 6A district
- In office January 3, 2017 – January 2, 2023
- Preceded by: Carly Melin
- Succeeded by: Spencer Igo

Personal details
- Born: Julie Tarnowski; 1969 or 1970 (age 56–57) Hibbing, Minnesota, U.S.
- Party: Minnesota Democratic–Farmer–Labor Party
- Spouse: Evan
- Education: College of St. Scholastica (BA); University of Saint Mary (M.Ed.)
- Occupation: Music teacher

Julie Sandstede (née Tarnowski) is an American politician and former member of the Minnesota House of Representatives. A member of the Minnesota Democratic–Farmer–Labor Party (DFL), she formerly represented District 6A in northeastern Minnesota.

== Early life, education, and career ==
Sandstede was born and raised in Hibbing, Minnesota, where she graduated from Hibbing High School. She attended the College of St. Scholastica, graduating with a Bachelor of Arts in music education, and the University of Saint Mary, graduating with a master's degree in curriculum and instruction.

Sandstede is a music teacher, first teaching at Cromwell–Wright School in Cromwell, Minnesota and then at Virginia Public Schools. She is also a volunteer firefighter in Colvin Township, St. Louis County, Minnesota, co-president of the Virginia Education Association, president of the Iron Range Service Unit, chair of the Education Minnesota professional advocacy committee, director of the Hibbing City Band, member of the Mesabi Symphony Orchestra and the Hibbing Alumni Band, and a Vacation Bible School volunteer.

== Minnesota House of Representatives ==
Sandstede won in her first attempt at elected office in 2016. She won a four-way DFL primary contest to be her party's candidate for Minnesota House District 6A. On November 8, 2016, she was elected to the Minnesota House of Representatives. Sandstede subsequently won reelection in 2018 and 2020. She lost her bid for a fourth term in 2022, losing the election to Republican Spencer Igo.

== Personal life ==
Sandstede and her husband, Evan, have three children and reside in Hibbing. She is a member and choir director at Chisholm Baptist Church.
