= Spencer Igo =

American politician

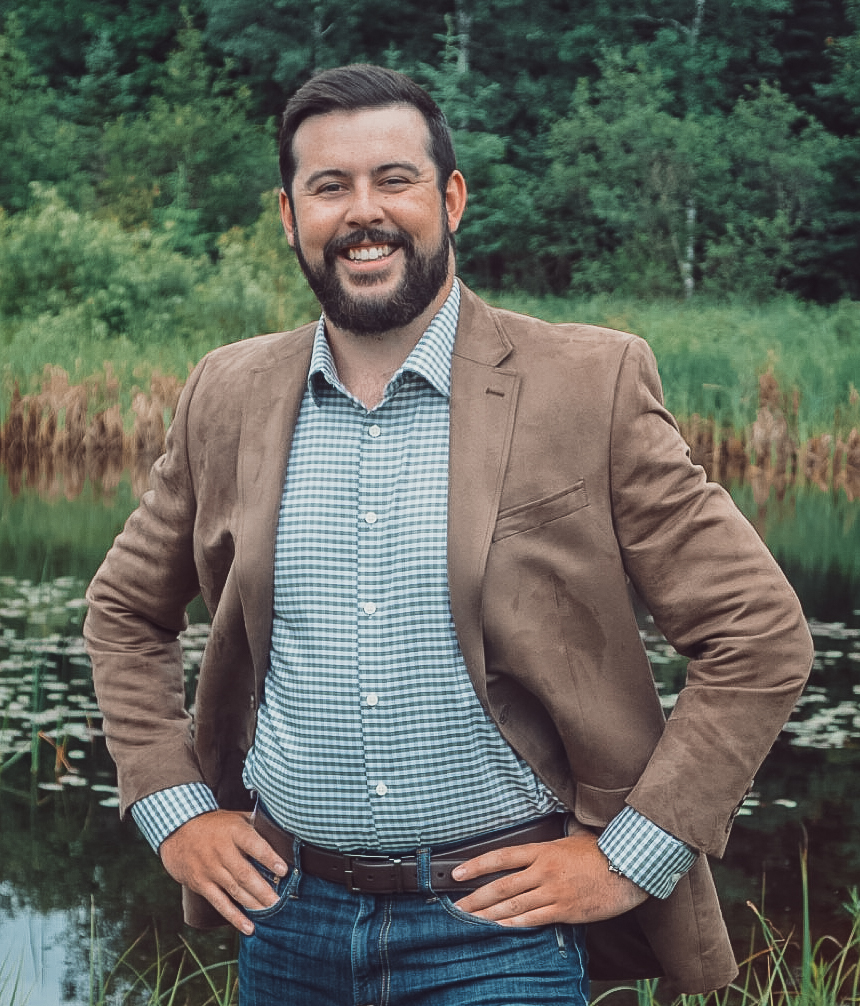
- Igo in 2020

Member of the Minnesota House of Representatives from the 7A district
- Incumbent
- Assumed office January 5, 2021
- Preceded by: Sandy Layman

Personal details
- Born: March 26, 1996 (age 30) Grand Rapids, Minnesota, U.S.
- Party: Republican
- Education: University of North Dakota (BS)
- Occupation: Legislator; Consultant
- Website: Government website Campaign website

Spencer R. Igo (/ˈaɪɡoʊ/ EYE-goh; born March 26, 1996) is an American politician serving since 2021 in the Minnesota House of Representatives. A member of the Republican Party of Minnesota, Igo represents District 7A in northern Minnesota, including the city of Hibbing and parts of Aitkin, Itasca and St. Louis Counties.

== Early life, education and career ==
Igo grew up in Grand Rapids, Minnesota and graduated from Grand Rapids High School. He earned a Bachelor of Science degree in public administration from the University of North Dakota.

Igo worked as a field director for Jason Lewis's 2018 campaign for the United States House of Representatives. He then worked as Congressman Pete Stauber's northern field representative in Minnesota's 8th congressional district from 2019 to 2021.

== Minnesota House of Representatives ==
Igo was elected to the Minnesota House of Representatives in 2020 and was reelected in 2022. He first ran after two-term Republican incumbent Sandy Layman announced that she would not seek reelection. Following 2022 legislative redistricting, he was drawn into the same area as DFL Representative Julie Sandstede, whom he defeated in the general election.

Igo serves as an assistant minority leader for the House Republican caucus and sits on the Climate and Energy, Economic Development, and Sustainable Infrastructure Committees.

Igo has been outspoken in his support of the mining and timber industries in northern Minnesota, and critical of the state environmental review process. He has argued that bans on mining will send mining jobs overseas where environmental and labor standards are lower and described himself as "pro-labor, against right-to-work." After Russia's invasion of Ukraine, Igo wrote a letter calling on President Joe Biden to increase oil production and mining to decrease reliance on foreign imports.

In 2021, Igo proposed legislation to hold a wolf hunting season. He opposed efforts to ban lead fishing tackles due to concerns with implementation and the high cost of alternatives. In 2026, he was the House author of 2026 Minnesota Amendment 1, which passed the House unanimously.

== Electoral history ==
2020 Minnesota State House - District 5B
Party	Candidate	Votes	%
Republican	Spencer Igo	14,432	61.04
Democratic (DFL)	Joe Abeyta	9,187	38.85
Write-in		26	0.11
Total votes		23,645	100.0
Republican hold			

2022 Minnesota State House - District 7A
Party	Candidate	Votes	%
Republican	Spencer Igo (incumbent)	10,342	53.75
Democratic (DFL)	Julie Sandstede (incumbent)	8,887	46.19
Write-in		13	0.07
Total votes		19,242	100.0
Republican hold			

== Personal life ==
Igo lives in Wabana Township, Minnesota. He is a member of St. Joseph's Catholic Church in Grand Rapids, Minnesota.
