= Sandy Layman =

American politician

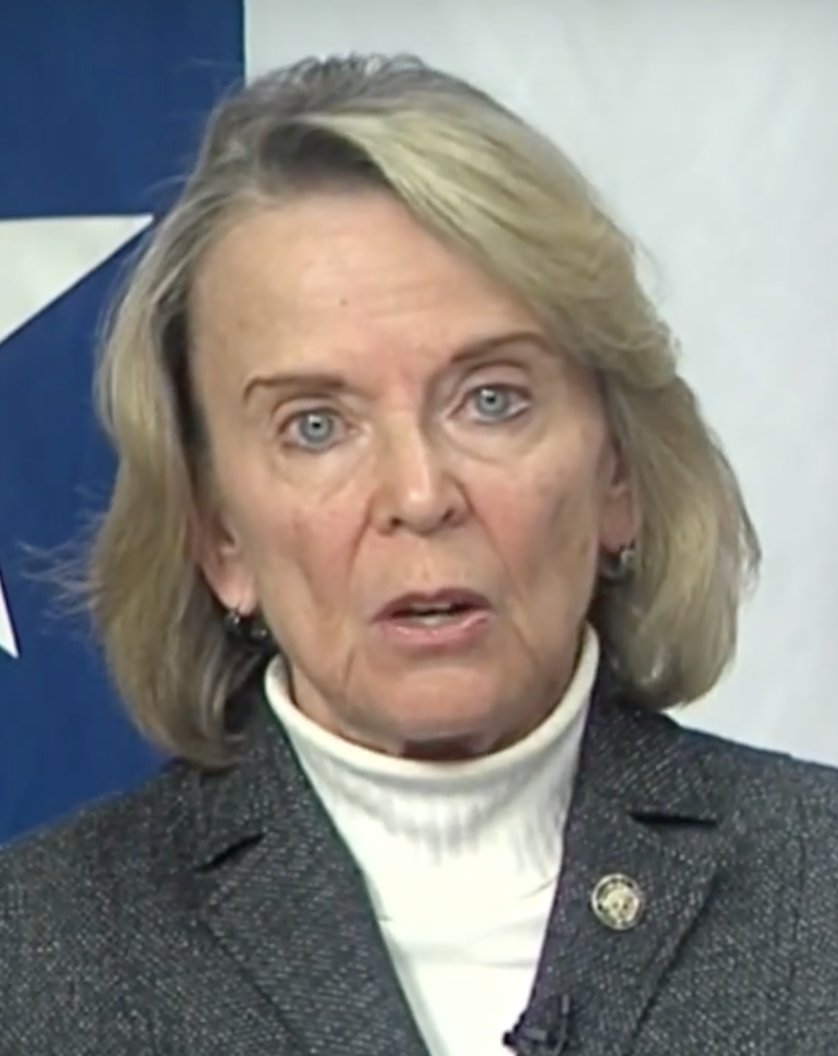

Member of the Minnesota House of Representatives from the 5B district
- In office January 3, 2017 – January 5, 2021
- Preceded by: Tom Anzelc
- Succeeded by: Spencer Igo

Commissioner of the Iron Range Resources Board
- In office May 5, 2003 – January 3, 2011
- Preceded by: John Swift
- Succeeded by: Tony Sertich

Personal details
- Born: October 5, 1950 (age 75)
- Party: Republican
- Spouse: Bill
- Children: 2
- Education: Concordia University (BA); University of St. Thomas (MBA)

Sandy Layman is an American politician who served as a member of the Minnesota House of Representatives from 2017 to 2021. A member of the Republican Party of Minnesota, she represented District 5B in northern Minnesota.

== Early life, education, and career ==
Layman graduated from Brooklyn Center High School. She earned a Bachelor of Arts degree in organizational management and communications from Concordia University and a Master of Business Administration in executive management from University of St. Thomas.

== Career ==
Layman was the president of the Grand Rapids Area Chamber of Commerce from 1987 to 1997, president of the Itasca Development Corporation from 1997 to 2003, commissioner of the Iron Range Resources Board for Governor Tim Pawlenty from 2003 to 2011, and an adjunct professor at the College of St. Scholastica from 2011 to 2016. She is on the boards of the Entrepreneur Fund, Itasca Community College Foundation, and the editorial committee of the Rural Minnesota Journal. She also provided consulting services via Layman Consulting. Layman lists her current occupation as retired on her LinkedIn profile.

=== Minnesota House of Representatives ===
Layman was elected to the Minnesota House of Representatives in 2016, defeating Minnesota Democratic–Farmer–Labor Party (DFL) incumbent Tom Anzelc. She won reelection in 2018, but chose not to run for reelection in 2020.

== Personal life ==
Layman and her husband, Bill, have two children. They reside in Cohasset, where they are members of Our Redeemer Lutheran Church.
