= Keewatin, Minnesota =

City in Minnesota, United States

Keewatin
- City
- Nickname: K-Town
- Motto: "A Nice Place To Live"
- Location of the city of Keewatin within Itasca County, Minnesota
- Coordinates: 47°23′47″N 93°4′42″W
- Country: United States
- State: Minnesota
- County: Itasca
- Founded: December 30, 1905
- Incorporated: July 31, 1906

Government
  - Mayor: Michael LaBine

Area
  - Total: 2.86 sq mi (7.41 km^{2})
  - Land: 2.62 sq mi (6.79 km^{2})
  - Water: 0.24 sq mi (0.62 km^{2})
- Elevation: 1,480 ft (450 m)

Population (2020)
  - Total: 984
  - Estimate (2022): 975
  - Density: 375/sq mi (144.9/km^{2})
- Time zone: UTC−6 (Central (CST))
  - Summer (DST): UTC−5 (CDT)
- ZIP Code: 55753
- Area code: 218
- FIPS code: 27-32570
- GNIS feature ID: 0646060
- Sales tax: 7.875%
- Website: keewatinmn.org

Keewatin (/kiˈwɑːtɪn/ kee-WAH-tin) is a city in Itasca County, Minnesota, United States. The population was 984 at the 2020 census.

U.S. Highway 169 serves as a main route in Keewatin. Students from the Keewatin area attend Nashwauk Keewatin High School.

== Geography ==
According to the United States Census Bureau, the city has a total area of 2.88 square miles (7.46 km^{2}), of which 2.46 square miles (6.37 km^{2}) is land and 0.42 square miles (1.09 km^{2}) is water.

== Demographics ==
Historical population
Census	Pop.	Note	%±
1910	695		—
1920	1,879		170.4%
1930	1,807		−3.8%
1940	1,942		7.5%
1950	1,807		−7.0%
1960	1,651		−8.6%
1970	1,382		−16.3%
1980	1,443		4.4%
1990	1,118		−22.5%
2000	1,164		4.1%
2010	1,068		−8.2%
2020	984		−7.9%
2022 (est.)	975		−0.9%
U.S. Decennial Census; 2020 Census

=== 2010 census ===
As of the census of 2010, there were 1,068 people, 475 households, and 265 families living in the city. The population density was 434.1 inhabitants per square mile (167.6/km^{2}). There were 546 housing units at an average density of 222.0 per square mile (85.7/km^{2}). The racial makeup of the city was 95.8% White, 0.5% African American, 1.3% Native American, 0.2% Asian, 0.1% from other races, and 2.2% from two or more races. Hispanic or Latino of any race were 0.3% of the population.

There were 475 households, of which 29.3% had children under the age of 18 living with them, 37.7% were married couples living together, 12.0% had a female householder with no husband present, 6.1% had a male householder with no wife present, and 44.2% were non-families. 37.5% of all households were made up of individuals, and 12% had someone living alone who was 65 years of age or older. The average household size was 2.25 and the average family size was 2.94.

The median age in the city was 39.9 years. 23.2% of residents were under the age of 18; 8.4% were between the ages of 18 and 24; 24.1% were from 25 to 44; 30.1% were from 45 to 64; and 14.1% were 65 years of age or older. The gender makeup of the city was 51.5% male and 48.5% female.

=== 2000 census ===
As of the census of 2000, there were 1,164 people, 522 households, and 306 families living in the city. The population density was 473.7 inhabitants per square mile (182.9/km^{2}). There were 550 housing units at an average density of 223.8 per square mile (86.4/km^{2}). The racial makeup of the city was 97.77% White, 0.34% African American, 0.34% Native American, 0.43% Asian, 0.09% from other races, and 1.03% from two or more races. Hispanic or Latino of any race were 0.09% of the population.

There were 522 households, out of which 27.4% had children under the age of 18 living with them, 44.1% were married couples living together, 10.7% had a female householder with no husband present, and 41.2% were non-families. 36.4% of all households were made up of individuals, and 17.6% had someone living alone who was 65 years of age or older. The average household size was 2.23 and the average family size was 2.92.

In the city, the population was distributed as follows: 25.3% were under 18, 8.4% were between 18 and 24, 26.4% were between 25 and 44, 22.3% were between 45 and 64, and 17.7% were 65 years of age or older. The median age was 38 years. There were 97.6 males for every 100 females, and 91.2 males for every 100 females aged 18 and over.

The median income for a household in the city was $28,795, and the median income for a family was $34,688. Males had a median income of $32,961 versus $20,536 for females. The per capita income for the city was $15,066. About 11.8% of families and 13.7% of the population were below the poverty line, including 14.9% of those under age 18 and 11.2% of those age 65 or over.

== Economy ==
Located to the north, U.S. Steel operates the Keewatin taconite or Keetac mines.

== Notable people ==
- John Anderson – Head coach of the University of Minnesota Golden Gophers baseball team.
- Gino Cappelletti (1934-2022) - Professional football player, most notably with the Boston Patriots
