= American Football League Most Valuable Player award =

The American Football League Most Valuable Player award was an award given out by the American Football League. It was determined by voters of the Associated Press, the United Press International, and The Sporting News.

During the awards ten-year existence (1960–1969), the American Football League's best player for each year was called the "Most Valuable Player" by some sports-news sources and the "Player of the Year" by others, most notably with Sporting News. Three of the ten seasons saw a split MVP. The only three-way split occurred in 1963 with Lance Alworth getting the UPI vote, Tobin Rote getting the AP vote and Clem Daniels getting the Sporting News vote. Daryle Lamonica was the only player to receive multiple AFL MVP awards in its ten-year history, being selected in 1967 and 1969. The awards by the major services are shown below.

== Winners ==
List of American Football League Most Valuable Player winners
Season	Player	Position	Team	Selector(s)
1960	Abner Haynes	HB	Dallas Texans	UPI
1961	George Blanda	QB	Houston Oilers	UPI, AP, TSN
1962	Cookie Gilchrist	HB	Buffalo Bills	UPI, AP
1962	Len Dawson	QB	Dallas Texans	TSN
1963	Lance Alworth	WR	San Diego Chargers	UPI
1963	Tobin Rote	QB	San Diego Chargers	AP
1963	Clem Daniels	HB	Oakland Raiders	TSN
1964	Gino Cappelletti	WR, K	Boston Patriots	UPI, AP, TSN
1965	Paul Lowe	HB	San Diego Chargers	TSN
1965	Jack Kemp	QB	Buffalo Bills	AP, UPI
1966	Jim Nance	HB	Boston Patriots	UPI, AP, TSN
1967	Daryle Lamonica	QB	Oakland Raiders	UPI, AP, TSN
1968	Joe Namath	QB	New York Jets	UPI, AP, TSN
1969	Daryle Lamonica (2)	QB	Oakland Raiders	UPI, AP, TSN

== Gallery ==
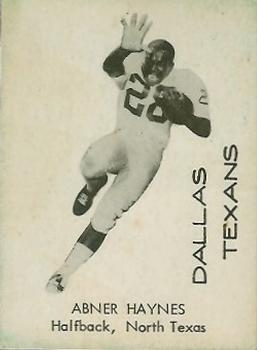
Abner Haynes ran for 875 yards on 5.6 yards per carry while catching 55 passes for 576 yards for 12 total touchdowns to win the 1960 MVP.

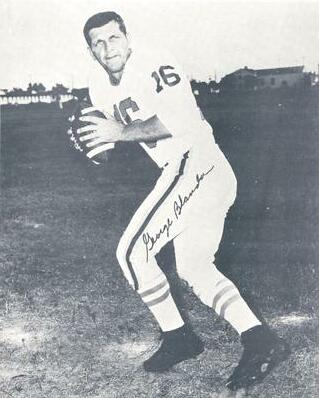
George Blanda passed for 3,330 yards for 36 touchdowns for a passer rating of 91.3 as quarterback and kicker.

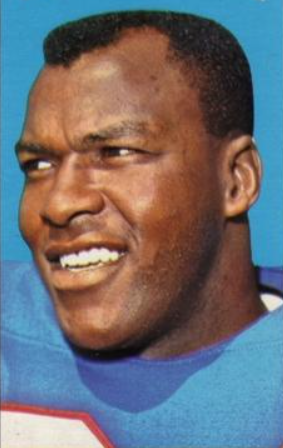
Cookie Gilchrist ran for 1,096 yards on 5.1 yards per carry for 13 touchdowns to win the 1962 UPI & AP MVP.

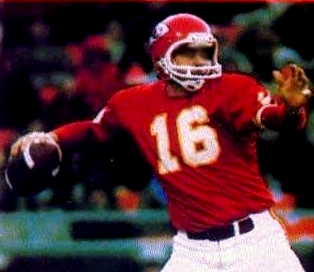
Len Dawson passed for 2,759 yards for a 61.0% completion percentage and a passer rating of 98.3 for 29 touchdowns to win the TSN MVP in 1962.

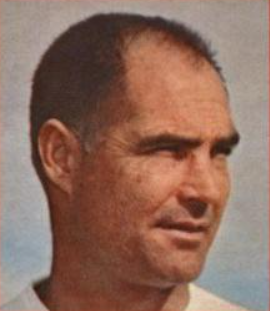
Tobin Rote passed for 2,510 yards for 20 touchdowns and a passer rating of 86.7 to win the AP MVP in 1963.

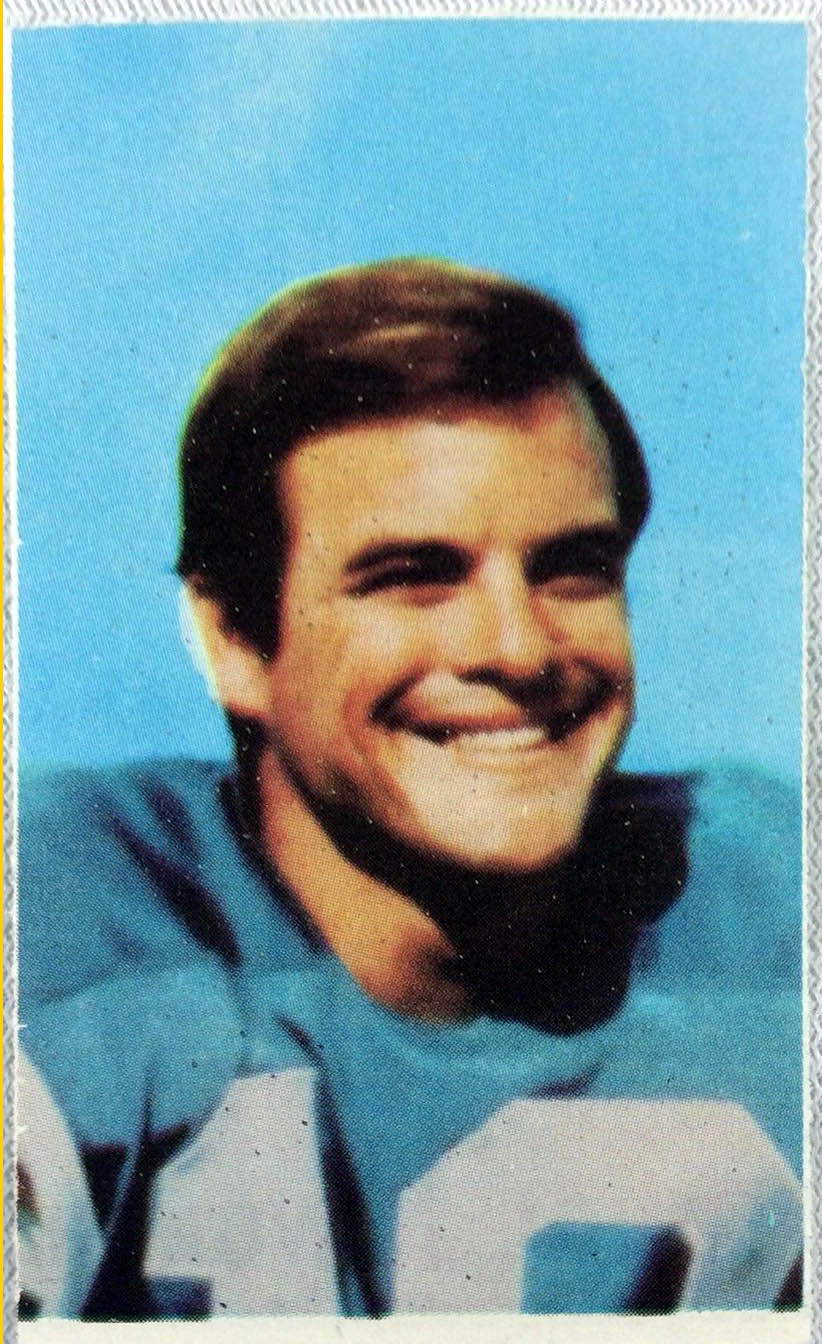
Lance Alworth caught 61 passes for 1,205 yards for 11 touchdowns for 19.8 yards per reception to win the UPI MVP in 1963.

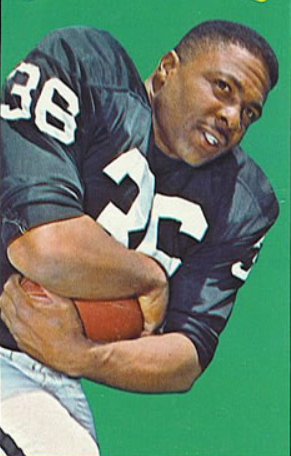
Clem Daniels ran for 1,098 yards for 5.1 yards per carry while catching 30 passes for 685 yards for eight total touchdowns to win the TSN MVP for 1963.

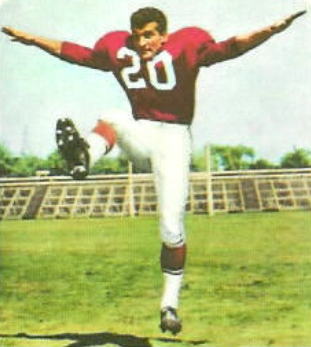
Gino Cappelletti caught 49 passes for 865 yards for seven touchdowns while also serving as kicker for 25 successful field goals to unanimously win the 1964 MVP.

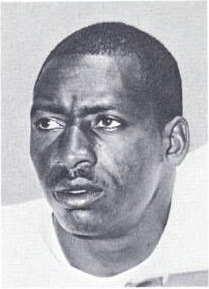
Paul Lowe rushed for 1,121 yards for 5.0 yards per carry for six touchdowns to win the TSN MVP for 1965.

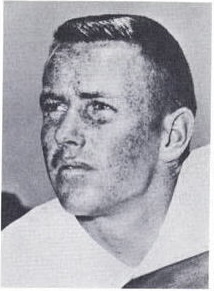
Jack Kemp threw for 2,368 yards for 10 touchdowns and a passer rating of 54.8 to win the AP/UPI MVP for 1965.

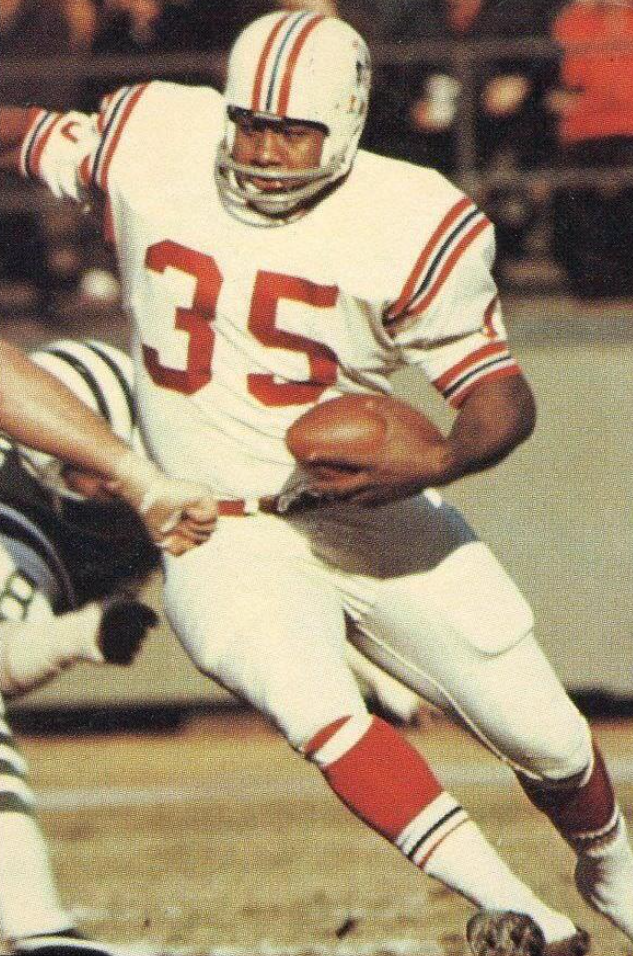
Jim Nance rushed for 1,458 yards on 4.9 yards per carry and 11 touchdowns to unanimously win the MVP in 1966.

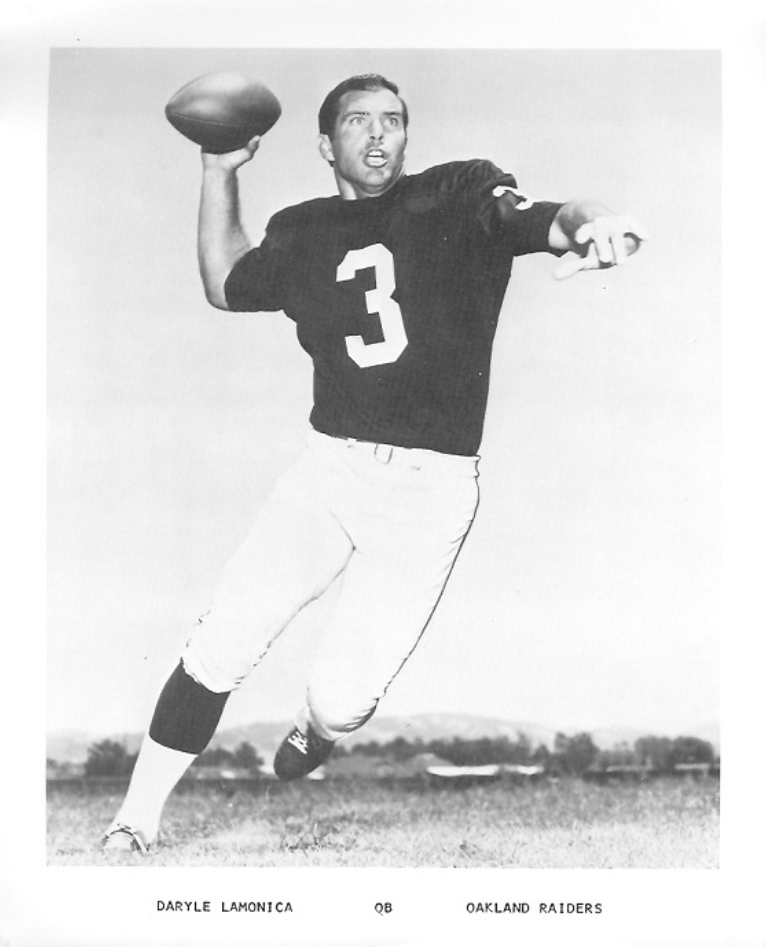
Daryle Lamonica threw for 3,228 yards with a passer rating of 80.8 for 30 touchdowns to unanimously win the 1967 MVP.

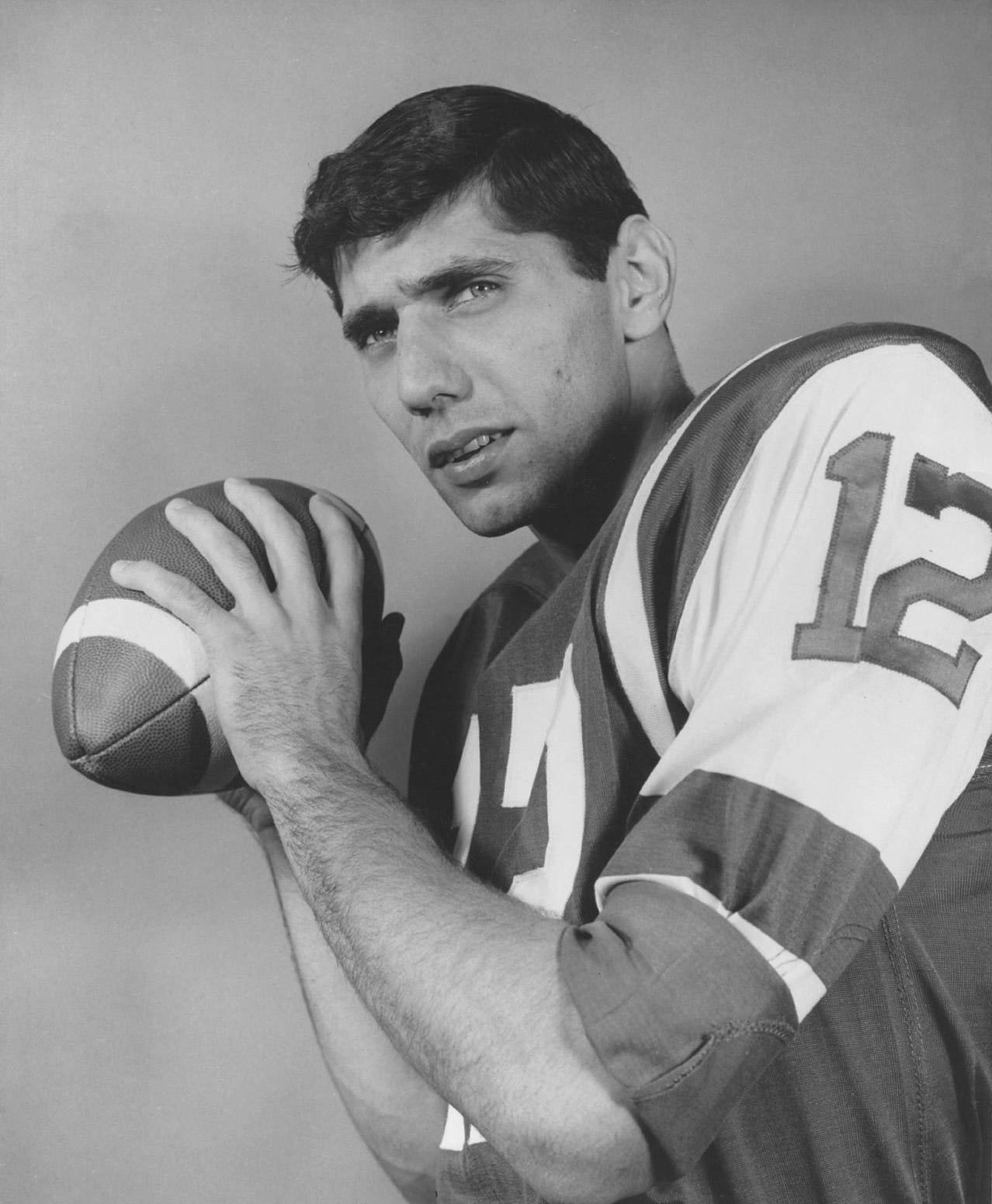
Joe Namath passed for 3,147 yards with 15 touchdowns and a passer rating of 72.1 to win the 1968 MVP.

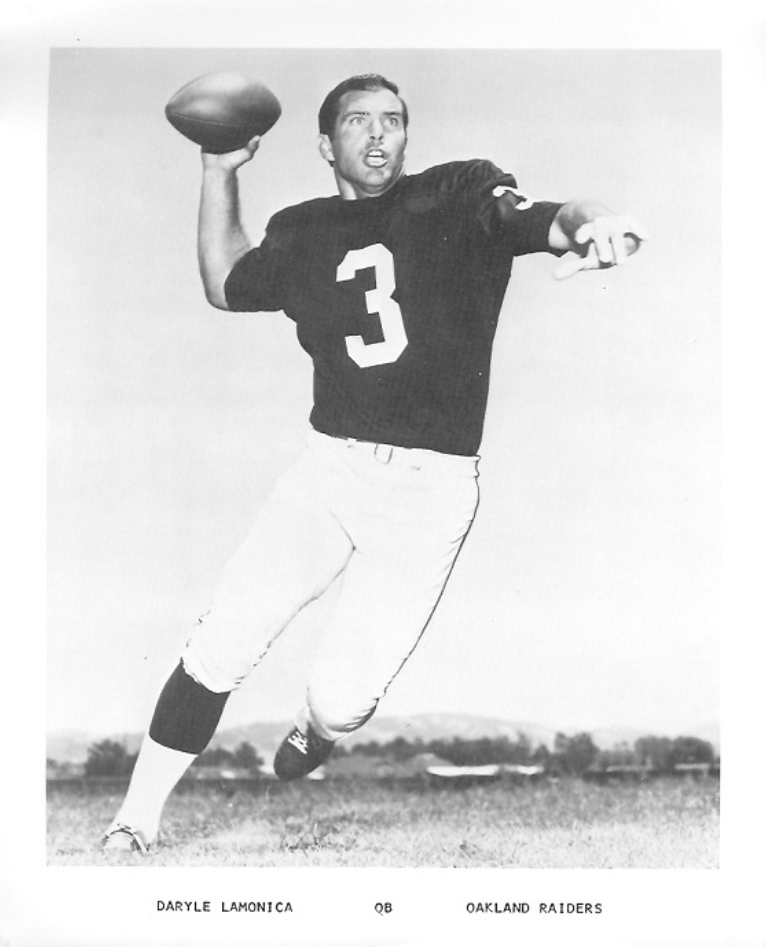
Daryle Lamonica passed for 3,302 yards with a passer rating of 79.8 for 34 touchdowns to win the final AFL MVP in 1969.

== See also ==
- UPI AFL-AFC Player of the Year
