= Gino Cappelletti =

American football player (1934–2022)

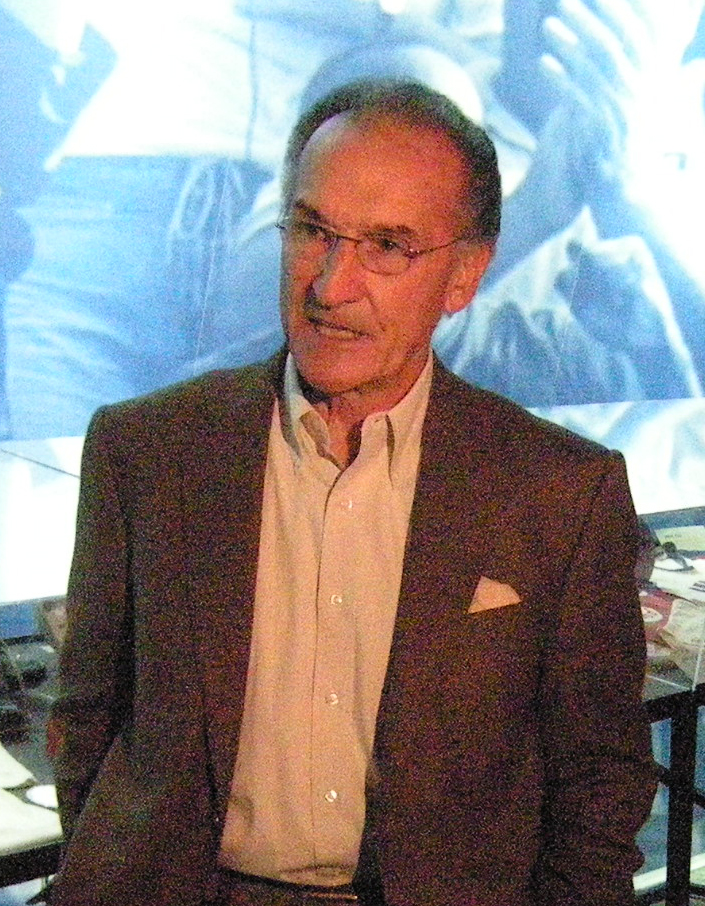
- Cappelletti in 2009

No. 20
- Positions: Wide receiver, placekicker

Personal information
- Born: March 26, 1934; Keewatin, Minnesota, U.S.
- Died: May 12, 2022 (aged 88); Wellesley, Massachusetts, U.S.
- Listed height: 6 ft 0 in (1.83 m)
- Listed weight: 190 lb (86 kg)

Career information
- High school: Keewatin
- College: Minnesota (1951–1954)
- AFL draft: 1960: undrafted

Career history
- Sarnia Imperials (1955); Toronto Balmy Beach Beachers (1956); Sarnia Golden Bears (1958); Boston Patriots (1960–1970)

Awards and highlights
- AFL MVP (1964); UPI AFL Player of the Year (1964); 4× Second-team All-AFL (1961, 1963, 1964, 1966); 5× All-Star (1961, 1963–1966); 5× AFL scoring leader (1961, 1963–1966); Boston Patriots All-1960s Team; New England Patriots 35th Anniversary Team; New England Patriots 50th Anniversary Team; New England Patriots Hall of Fame; New England Patriots No. 20 retired; NFL record: Most seasons leading league in points scored: 5, (1961, 1963–1966; tied with Don Hutson and Stephen Gostkowski)

Career AFL/NFL statistics
- Receiving yards: 4,589
- Receiving touchdowns: 42
- Field goals: 176/333 (52.9%)
- Extra points: 342/353 (96.9%)
- Interceptions: 4
- Stats at Pro Football Reference

Gino Raymond Michael Cappelletti (March 26, 1934 – May 12, 2022) was an American professional football player. He played college football for the Minnesota Golden Gophers and was an All-Star in the American Football League (AFL) for the Boston Patriots, winning the 1964 AFL Most Valuable Player Award. Cappelletti is a member of the Patriots Hall of Fame, and the Patriots' All-1960s team. He served as the Patriots' radio color commentator until July 2012. His nicknames included "the Duke" and "Mr. Patriot".

== Early life ==
Cappelletti was born in Keewatin in northern Minnesota, on March 26, 1934. He attended Keewatin High School in his hometown, and was employed on the railroad and in iron ore mines during his teenaged years, also dating Patricia Morris. He went on to play college football at the University of Minnesota, where he was a quarterback, backing up All-American Paul Giel. Cappelletti kicked extra points, but the Golden Gophers did not kick field goals in those years. As a sophomore in 1952, though, Cappelletti talked the coach into letting him try a game-winning 43-yard kick against Iowa.

As a senior in 1954, Cappelletti switched to T-quarterback and led Minnesota to a 7–2 record, missing the final game with an elbow injury, a 27–0 loss at Wisconsin. He was named to the All-Big Ten second team, but was not selected in the 1955 NFL draft.

== Professional football career ==
=== Canada ===
Cappelletti played quarterback for the Sarnia Imperials of the Ontario Rugby Football Union (ORFU) in Canada during 1955. He joined Toronto Balmy Beach in 1956, but was drafted into the U.S. Army in midseason, returning to Canada in 1958. Cappelletti signed with the Winnipeg Blue Bombers of the Canadian Football League, but was traded to the Saskatchewan Roughriders, was later cut, and went back to the ORFU, leading the Sarnia Golden Bears (the team having changed its name in 1956) to the league championship.

=== Boston Patriots ===
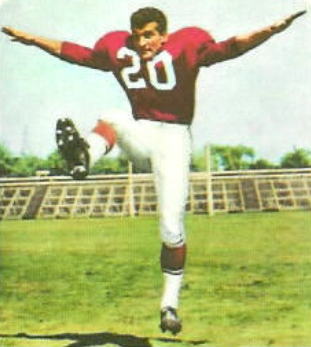
Cappelletti in a football card in 1962.

Cappelletti was out of professional football in 1959, back in Minnesota working as a bartender in his brother's lounge, when he asked the Patriots for a tryout in the summer of 1960. With the launch of the American Football League (AFL) in 1960, he joined the Boston Patriots and was initially a kicker and defensive back. He switched to offense late in that season and teamed with quarterback Babe Parilli to form a tandem nicknamed "Grand Opera Twins", due to their Italian surnames. Cappelletti won AFL MVP honors in 1964, led the league in scoring five times, and was a five-time AFL All-Star. One of 20 AFL players active during the entirety of the league's 10-year existence, Cappelletti, George Blanda, and Jim Otto were the only players who played in every one of his team's AFL games. He played with the Patriots all 11 years in Boston, from 1960 through the 1970 NFL merger season, and retired in late August 1971 at age 37; he was the AFL's all-time leading scorer with 1,130 points (42 TDs, 176 FGs, and 342 PATs) and among the AFL's top-10 all-time receivers in yards and receptions. Cappelletti had two of the top-five scoring seasons in professional football history, with 155 points in 1964 and 147 points in 1961 (14-game seasons). His Patriots team scoring record lasted until it was broken by Adam Vinatieri on December 5, 2005. At the time of his death, Cappelletti was the Patriots' 12th all-time-leading receiver in receptions with 292 catches and 10th in receiving yards with 4,589 yards. He was fifth in Patriots history in receiving touchdowns with 42, and had the second-most field goal attempts (333) in team history behind Stephen Gostkowski.

During Cappelletti's professional career, he also returned punts and kickoffs, played defensive back, and even had one pass completion for a touchdown. He was the second AFL player to record three interceptions (off Tom Flores) in a regular-season game, scored 18 points or more in a game 10 times, and scored 20 or more points in a game eight times. He set the AFL single-game record by scoring 28 points in the Patriots' 42–14 rout of Houston on December 18, 1965. Cappelletti is the only player in professional football history to run for a two-point conversion, throw for a two-point conversion, catch a pass, intercept a pass, return a punt, and return a kickoff in the same season. He kicked six field goals (without a miss) in a 39–10 win at Denver on October 4, 1964, and became one of only two AFL kickers with at least four field goals per game for three consecutive games. Cappelletti led the AFL in field-goal percentage in 1965.

The Patriots played their home games at Fenway Park from 1963-1968. To avoid interfering with spectator views, both home and visiting teams shared the same sideline along Fenway's left field wall, an arrangement that sometimes led to players wandering to the opposing team's bench to eavesdrop on play calls. After his retirement, he told an interviewer that during one game against the Kansas City Chiefs, he remembered coach Hank Stram "...calling for screen passes and us yelling to our defense about what was coming."

In 1984, Cappelletti was inducted into the National Italian American Sports Hall of Fame. He was inducted to the New England Patriots Hall of Fame in 1992. His number, 20, was retired by the team. He was not selected to the Pro Football Hall of Fame, though, at the time of his death. He was part of the inaugural class of the Professional Football Researchers Association Hall of Very Good in 2003.

== Broadcasting ==
Cappelletti worked alongside Gil Santos as a color commentator for the Patriots' radio broadcasts on the New England Patriots Radio Network (in the 1988–90 period, he worked alongside Dale Arnold). The Santos–Cappelletti duo lasted 28 seasons, the longest radio tandem in modern NFL history. They called 585 regular-season and postseason games together, including six Super Bowls.

Cappelletti also served as color commentator for the Boston College Eagles during the famous "Hail Flutie" game in 1984. Cappelletti can be heard supporting Dan Davis' now-famous call by yelling, "He got it! He got it! I don't believe it!"

On July 20, 2012, Cappelletti announced his retirement from broadcasting.

== Personal life ==
Cappelletti was the father-in-law of ex–Boston College and Chicago Bears receiver Tom Waddle. He was not related to running back John Cappelletti of Penn State, the Heisman Trophy winner in 1973. Cappelletti died on May 12, 2022, at the age of 88.

== AFL/NFL career statistics ==
Legend
	AFL MVP
	Led the league
**Bold**	Career high

=== Regular season ===
Year	Team	Games		Receiving					Kicking							
Year	Team	GP	GS	Rec	Yds	Avg	Lng	TD	FGM	FGA	%	LNG	XPM	XPA	%	PTS
1960	BOS	14	5	1	28	**28.0**	28	0	8	22	36.4	35	30	32	93.8	60
1961	BOS	14	14	45	768	17.1	53	8	17	32	53.1	46	**48**	**50**	96.0	147
1962	BOS	14	14	34	479	14.1	40	5	20	37	54.1	45	38	40	95.0	128
1963	BOS	14	12	34	493	14.5	38	2	22	38	57.9	47	35	36	97.2	113
1964	BOS	14	12	**49**	**865**	17.7	58	7	**25**	**39**	**64.1**	51	36	36	**100.0**	**155**
1965	BOS	14	14	37	680	18.4	57	**9**	17	27	63.0	**53**	27	27	**100.0**	132
1966	BOS	14	14	43	676	15.7	**63**	6	16	34	47.1	49	35	36	97.2	119
1967	BOS	14	12	35	397	11.3	35	3	16	31	51.6	45	29	30	96.7	95
1968	BOS	14	2	13	182	14.0	30	2	15	27	55.6	42	26	26	**100.0**	83
1969	BOS	14	0	1	21	21.0	21	0	14	34	41.2	43	26	27	96.3	68
1970	BOS	13	0	–	–	–	–	–	6	15	40.0	41	12	13	92.3	30
Career		153	99	292	4,589	15.7	63	42	176	336	52.4	53	342	353	96.9	1,130

== See also ==
- List of American Football League players
