= 2022 Minnesota House of Representatives election =

- November 8, 2022

All 134 seats in the Minnesota House of Representatives 68 seats needed for a majority
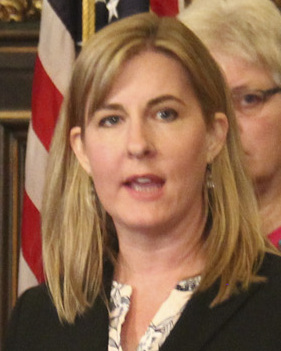

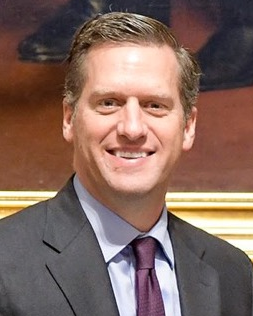
	Majority party	Minority party
Leader	Melissa Hortman	Kurt Daudt
Party	Democratic (DFL)	Republican
Leader since	January 3, 2017	January 8, 2013
Leader's seat	34B (Note: Redistricted from the 36B district.)–Brooklyn Park	27B (Note: Redistricted from the 31A district.)–Crown
Last election	70 seats, 51.06%	64 seats, 48.17%
Seats won	70	64
Seat change	Steady	Steady
Popular vote	1,237,520	1,173,659
Percentage	50.91%	48.29%
Swing	▼0.15 pp	▲0.12 pp
Speaker before election
Melissa Hortman
Democratic (DFL)
Elected Speaker
Melissa Hortman
Democratic (DFL)

The 2022 Minnesota House of Representatives election was held in the U.S. state of Minnesota on November 8, 2022, to elect members to the House of Representatives of the 93rd Minnesota Legislature. A primary election was held in several districts on August 9, 2022. The election coincided with the election of the other chamber of the Legislature, the Senate.

Democrats (DFL) retained all of their seats, keeping their majority of 70 out of 134 seats. This happened simultaneously with gains in the state senate, giving the DFL control of that chamber for the first time since 2012, and Governor Tim Walz winning re-election. The DFL won a trifecta in the state for the first time since 2012.

== Background ==
As a result of the 2020 election, the DFL maintained control of the House, albeit with a reduced seat majority. Republicans maintained control of the senate, making Minnesota and Alaska the only US states with split control of the legislature.

Over the past several election cycles, the DFL had lost ground in Iron Range districts to the Republicans. The first sign was the surprise defeat of long-time DFLer Jim Oberstar to Tea Party Republican Chip Cravaack in the 2010 midterm election, but it was the 2016 and 2020 presidential elections that saw the largest swings. Iron Range DFL House candidates have narrowly won their seats, but typically by only small margins in districts that used to be safe DFL. For example, DFL Rep. Julie Sandstede of Hibbing was elected by just 30 votes, after winning by more than 4,300 votes in 2018. The five tossup districts which are a part of the Iron Range–3A, 3B, 7A, 7B, and 11A–may determine which party controls the chamber in future elections.

== Electoral system ==
The 134 members of the House of Representatives were elected from single-member districts via first-past-the-post voting for two-year terms. Contested nominations of recognized major parties (Democratic-Farmer-Labor, Grassroots–Legalize Cannabis, Legal Marijuana Now, and Republican) for each district were determined by an open primary election. Minor party and independent candidates were nominated by petition. Write-in candidates were required to file a request with the secretary of state's office for votes for them to be counted. The filing period lasted from May 17, 2022, until May 31, 2022.

== Retiring members ==
Retiring incumbents (dark red and dark blue) by district

=== DFL ===
- Paul Marquart, 4B
- Jennifer Schultz, 7A (ran for Minnesota's 8th U.S. Congressional District)
- Mike Sundin, 11A
- Todd Lippert, 20B
- Liz Boldon, 25B (seeking Senate seat)
- Kelly Morrison, 33B (seeking Senate seat)
- Ami Wazlawik, 38B
- Shelly Christensen, 39B
- Connie Bernardy, 41A
- Ryan Winkler, 46A (ran for Hennepin County Attorney)
- Tou Xiong, 53A (seeking Senate seat)
- Steve Sandell, 53B
- Jim Davnie, 63A
- Rena Moran, 65A (ran for Ramsey County Commissioner)
- Carlos Mariani, 65B
- Alice Hausman, 66A

=== Republican ===
- Steve Green, 2B (seeking Senate seat)
- Jordan Rasmusson, 8A (seeking Senate seat)
- John Poston, 9A
- Dale Lueck, 10B
- Tama Theis, 14A (seeking Senate seat)
- Sondra Erickson, 15A
- Tim Miller, 17A
- Glenn Gruenhagen, 18B (seeking Senate seat)
- Barb Haley, 21A (seeking Senate seat)
- Steve Drazkowski, 21B (seeking Senate seat)
- Rod Hamilton, 22B
- Jeremy Munson, 23B (ran for Minnesota's 1st U.S. Congressional District)
- Nels Pierson, 26B (ran for Minnesota's 1st U.S. Congressional District)
- Eric Lucero, 30B (seeking Senate seat)
- Cal Bahr, 31B (seeking Senate seat)
- Bob Dettmer, 39A
- Tony Jurgens, 54B (seeking Senate seat)
- Tony Albright, 55B

== Predictions ==
Source	Ranking	As of
Sabato's Crystal Ball	Tossup	May 19, 2022
CNalysis	Tossup	September 12, 2022

== Results ==
Districts won

Party	Candidates	Votes			Seats		
Party	Candidates	No.	%	+/−	No.	+/−	%
Minnesota Democratic–Farmer–Labor Party	130	1,237,520	50.91	-0.15	70	0	52.24
Republican Party of Minnesota	122	1,173,659	48.29	+0.12	64	0	47.76
Independence–Alliance Party of Minnesota	1	4,422	0.18	+0.18	0	0	0
Legal Marijuana Now Party	4	3,851	0.16	-0.12	0	0	0
Independent	1	2,158	0.08	+0.08	0	0	0
Libertarian Party of Minnesota	1	785	0.03	+0.03	0	0	0
Write-in	N/A	8,178	0.34	-0.13	0	0	0
Total		2,430,571	100	N/A	134	N/A	100
Invalid/blank votes							
Total							
Registered voters/turnout							
Source: Minnesota Secretary of State

=== Close races ===
There were 25 districts where the margin of victory was under 10%:

District	Incumbent	Retiring	Party	First elected	Margin (pp)	Result
2A	Matt Grossell	No	Rep.	2016	8.80	Rep. hold
3A	Rob Ecklund	No	DFL	2015	0.07	Rep. gain
3B	Mary Murphy	No	DFL	1976	0.16	Rep. gain
7A	Julie Sandstede (old 6A) Spencer Igo (old 5B)	No No	DFL Rep.	2016 2020	7.56	Rep. win
7B	Dave Lislegard	No	DFL	2018	2.34	DFL hold
11A	Mike Sundin	Yes	DFL	2012	2.45	Rep. gain
14A	Tama Theis	Yes	Rep.	2013	1.39	Rep. hold
14B	Dan Wolgamott	No	DFL	2018	3.66	DFL hold
18A	Susan Akland	No	Rep.	2020	2.20	DFL gain
32B	Donald Raleigh	No	Rep.	2020	2.33	DFL gain
33B	Kelly Morrison	Yes	DFL	2018	8.03	DFL hold
34A	New district		N/A	N/A	6.76	Rep. win
35A	Zack Stephenson (old 36A) John Heinrich (old 35A)	No No	DFL Rep.	2018 2018	4.97	DFL win
35B	New district	N/A	N/A	N/A	1.35	DFL win
36A	New district	N/A	N/A	N/A	2.82	Rep. win
36B	Ami Wazlawik	Yes	DFL	2018	7.10	DFL hold
41A	New district	N/A	N/A	N/A	0.55	Rep. win
41B	Tony Jurgens	Yes	Rep.	2016	2.18	Rep. hold
45A	New district	N/A	N/A	N/A	6.09	Rep. win
47B	New district	N/A	N/A	N/A	6.32	DFL win
48B	Greg Boe	Yes	Rep.	2018	2.00	DFL gain
54A	Erik Mortensen	No	Rep.	2020	8.29	DFL gain
55A	Jessica Hanson	No	DFL	2020	6.14	DFL hold
57B	New district	N/A	N/A	N/A	3.33	Rep. win
58A	Todd Lippert	Yes	DFL	2018	9.02	DFL hold

=== Primary elections results ===
A primary election was held in 20 districts to nominate Republican and DFL candidates. Twelve Republican nominations and eight DFL nominations were contested. Eight incumbents were opposed for their party's nomination. DFL incumbents John Thompson (67A) and Andrew Carlson (50B), who was running against fellow incumbent Steve Elkins, were not renominated.

Primary results by district
District		Party	Candidates	Votes	%
3A		Republican	Roger Skraba	3,030	66.73
3A		Republican	Blain Johnson	1,511	33.27
3A		DFL	Rob Ecklund (incumbent)	3,870	100.0
5B		Republican	Mike Wiener	2,099	50.48
5B		Republican	Sheldon Monson	2,059	49.52
6B		Republican	Josh Heintzeman (incumbent)	3,132	79.92
6B		Republican	Doug Kern	787	20.08
6B		DFL	Sally Boos	1,465	100.0
8	A	Republican	Art Johnston	1,053	66.81
8	A	Republican	Doug Kern	523	33.19
8	A	DFL	Liz Olson (incumbent)	3,496	100.0
8	B	Republican	Becky Hall	1,581	100.0
8	B	DFL	Alicia Kozlowski	3,616	56.21
8	B	DFL	Arik Forsman	2,817	43.79
10	A	Republican	Ron Kresha (incumbent)	3,572	73.65
10	A	Republican	Chuck Parins	1,278	26.35
10	B	Republican	Isaac Schultz	2,997	58.04
10	B	Republican	Blake Paulson	1,718	33.27
10	B	Republican	John Ulrick	449	8.69
10	B	DFL	Hunter Froelich	751	100.0
20A		Republican	Pam Altendorf	2,898	51.81
20A		Republican	Jesse Johnson	2,695	48.19
20A		DFL	Laurel Stinson	2,738	100.0
21B		Republican	Marj Fogelman	2,672	82.42
21B		Republican	Jayesun Israel Sherman	570	17.58
21B		DFL	Michael Heidelberger	1,323	100.0
26B		Republican	Greg Davids	3,268	75.91
26B		Republican	Laura H. Thorson	1,037	24.09
27B		Republican	Kurt Daudt (incumbent)	2,189	73.19
27B		Republican	Rachel Davids	802	26.81
27B		DFL	Brad Brown	793	100.0
33B		Republican	Mark Bishofsky	1,637	59.99
33B		Republican	Tina Riehle	1,092	40.01
33B		DFL	Josiah Hill	3,170	100.0
48A		Republican	Jim Nash (incumbent)	1,993	100.0
48A		DFL	Nathan Kells	709	52.25
48A		DFL	Arian Brinkmeier	648	47.75
50B		Republican	Beth Beebe	2,206	100.0
50B		DFL	Steve Elkins (incumbent, old 49B)	3,179	61.09
50B		DFL	Andrew Carlson (incumbent, old 50B)	2,025	38.91
52A		Republican	Fern Smith	1,408	100.0
52A		DFL	Liz Reyer (incumbent)	2,037	60.86
52A		DFL	Sandra Masin	1,310	39.14
54A		Republican	Erik Mortensen (incumbent)	1,474	55.00
54A		Republican	Bob Loonan	1,206	45.00
54A		DFL	Brad Tabke	1,207	100.0
54A		LMN	Ryan Martin	15	100.0
62A		DFL	Aisha Gomez (incumbent)	4,167	69.44
62A		DFL	Osman Ahmed	1,834	30.56
65B		Republican	Kevin Fjelsted	602	100.0
65B		DFL	Maria Isa Pérez-Hedges	3,613	81.71
65B		DFL	Anna Botz	809	18.29
66A		Republican	Trace Johnson	646	100.0
66A		DFL	Leigh Finke	4,034	63.17
66A		DFL	Dave Thomas	2,352	36.83
67A		Republican	Beverly Peterson	432	100.0
67A		DFL	Liz Lee	2,168	88.93
67A		DFL	John Thompson (incumbent)	270	11.07
Source: Minnesota Secretary of State

=== District results ===
Source: Minnesota Secretary of State

==== District 1A ====
Incumbent Republican John Burkel was first elected in 2020. District 1A is located in northwestern Minnesota covering the northernmost portions of the Red River Valley. Large cities in the district are Roseau, Thief River Falls, and Warren.

2022 Minnesota House of Representatives District 1A election
Party	Candidate	Votes	%
Republican	John Burkel (incumbent)	13,575	76.26
Democratic (DFL)	James Sceville	4,217	23.69
Write-in		10	0.06
Total votes		17,802	100%

==== District 1B ====
Incumbent Republican Debra Kiel was first elected in 2010. District 1B is located in northwestern Minnesota and includes East Grand Forks, Crookston, and Red Lake Falls.

2022 Minnesota House of Representatives District 1B election
Party	Candidate	Votes	%
Republican	Debra Kiel (incumbent)	10,878	71.13
Democratic (DFL)	Cindy Ansbacher	4,399	28.76
Write-in		16	0.10
Total votes		15,293	100%

==== District 2A ====
Incumbent Republican Matt Grossell was first elected in 2016. District 2A is located in northwestern Minnesota, stretching as far south as Bemidji and as far north as the Northwest Angle.

2022 Minnesota House of Representatives District 2A election
Party	Candidate	Votes	%
Republican	Matt Grossell (incumbent)	8,836	54.35
Democratic (DFL)	Reed Olson	7,405	45.55
Write-in		16	0.10
Total votes		16,257	100%

==== District 2B ====
Incumbent Republican Matt Bliss was elected in the 2020 election. Bliss previously represented District 5A from 2017 to 2019, but lost to John Persell by 11 votes in the 2018 election. District 2B is located in north-central Minnesota.

2022 Minnesota House of Representatives District 2B election
Party	Candidate	Votes	%
Republican	Matt Bliss (incumbent)	11,310	63.46
Democratic (DFL)	Erika Bailey-Johnson	6,505	36.50
Write-in		8	0.04
Total votes		17,823	100%

==== District 3A ====
Incumbent DFLer Rob Ecklund was first elected in a 2015 special election. District 3A is located in northeastern Minnesota, covering large portions of the Iron Range and the northern Arrowhead Region. Cities in the 3A district include International Falls, Ely, Silver Bay, and Grand Marais. It is the largest house district by area.

2022 Minnesota House of Representatives District 3A election
Party	Candidate	Votes	%
Republican	Roger Skraba	10,868	49.98
Democratic (DFL)	Rob Ecklund (incumbent)	10,853	49.91
Write-in		22	0.10
Total votes		21,743	100%

==== District 3B ====
Incumbent DFLer Mary Murphy was first elected in 1976. She had represented District 3B since 2012. District 3B surrounds the city of Duluth.

2022 Minnesota House of Representatives District 3B election
Party	Candidate	Votes	%
Republican	Natalie Zeleznikar	10,812	50.01
Democratic (DFL)	Mary Murphy (incumbent)	10,777	49.85
Write-in		31	0.14
Total votes		21,620	100%

==== District 4A ====
Incumbent DFLer Heather Keeler was first elected in the 2020 election. District 4A covers most of the city of Moorhead.

2022 Minnesota House of Representatives District 4A election
Party	Candidate	Votes	%
Democratic (DFL)	Heather Keeler (incumbent)	7,664	58.58
Republican	Lynn Halmrast	5,403	41.30
Write-in		16	0.12
Total votes		13,083	100%

==== District 4B ====
Incumbent DFLer Paul Marquart, who was first elected in 2000, chose not run for re-election. The district, located in northwestern Minnesota, surrounds the city of Moorhead and includes Glyndon and Detroit Lakes.

2022 Minnesota House of Representatives District 4B election
Party	Candidate	Votes	%
Republican	Jim Joy	10,780	62.88
Democratic (DFL)	John Hest	6,348	37.03
Write-in		15	0.09
Total votes		17,143	100%

==== District 5A ====
District 5A is located in north central Minnesota. The largest city in 5A is Park Rapids.

2022 Minnesota House of Representatives District 5A election
Party	Candidate	Votes	%
Republican	Krista Knudsen	14,735	70.49
Democratic (DFL)	Brian Hobson	6,159	29.46
Write-in		10	0.05
Total votes		20,904	100%

==== District 5B ====
District 5B is the only district in which the Independence Party of Minnesota fielded a candidate. The district is located in central Minnesota and covers all of Todd County plus portions of Morrison, Cass, and Wadena counties.

2022 Minnesota House of Representatives District 5B election
Party	Candidate	Votes	%
Republican	Mike Wiener	13,679	75.36
Independence	Gregg Hendrickson	4,422	24.36
Write-in		50	0.28
Total votes		18,151	100%

==== District 6A ====
District 6A, located in north central Minnesota, stretches from Grand Rapids to Garrison.

2022 Minnesota House of Representatives District 6A election
Party	Candidate	Votes	%
Republican	Ben Davis	13,657	62.30
Democratic (DFL)	Rick Blake	8,258	37.67
Write-in		7	0.03
Total votes		21,922	100%

==== District 6B ====
Incumbent Republican Josh Heintzeman was first elected in 2014. District 6B's largest city is Brainerd.

2022 Minnesota House of Representatives District 6B election
Party	Candidate	Votes	%
Republican	Josh Heintzeman (incumbent)	12,623	65.22
Democratic (DFL)	Sally Boos	6,698	34.61
Write-in		33	0.17
Total votes		19,354	100%

==== District 7A ====
Newly created District 7A had two incumbents: DFLer Julie Sandstede, first elected in 2016, and Republican Spencer Igo, first elected in 2020.

2022 Minnesota House of Representatives District 7A election
Party	Candidate	Votes	%
Republican	Spencer Igo (incumbent)	10,342	53.75
Democratic (DFL)	Julie Sandstede (incumbent)	8,887	46.19
Write-in		13	0.07
Total votes		19,242	100%

==== District 7B ====
Incumbent DFLer Dave Lislegard was first elected in 2018.

2022 Minnesota House of Representatives District 7B election
Party	Candidate	Votes	%
Democratic (DFL)	Dave Lislegard (incumbent)	10,178	51.09
Republican	Matt Norri	9,711	48.75
Write-in		32	0.16
Total votes		19,921	100%

==== District 8A ====
Incumbent DFLer Liz Olson was first elected in 2018. District 8A covers the southwestern portion of the city of Duluth.

2022 Minnesota House of Representatives District 8A election
Party	Candidate	Votes	%
Democratic (DFL)	Liz Olson (incumbent)	11,587	70.48
Republican	Art Johnston	4,830	29.38
Write-in		22	0.13
Total votes		16,439	100%

==== District 8B ====
Incumbent DFLer Jennifer Schultz, who was first elected in 2014, instead ran for Minnesota's 8th congressional district.

2022 Minnesota House of Representatives District 8B election
Party	Candidate	Votes	%
Democratic (DFL)	Alicia Kozlowski	14,593	70.95
Republican	Becky Hall	5,929	28.83
Write-in		45	0.22
Total votes		20,567	100%

==== District 9A ====
Incumbent Republican Jeff Backer was first elected in 2014.

2022 Minnesota House of Representatives District 9A election
Party	Candidate	Votes	%
Republican	Jeff Backer (incumbent)	12,248	66.30
Democratic (DFL)	Nancy Jost	6,172	33.41
Write-in		54	0.29
Total votes		18,474	100%

==== District 9B ====
2022 Minnesota House of Representatives District 9B election
Party	Candidate	Votes	%
Republican	Tom Murphy	15,322	70.29
Democratic (DFL)	Jason Satter	6,431	29.50
Write-in		45	0.21
Total votes		21,798	100%

==== District 10A ====
2022 Minnesota House of Representatives District 10A election
Party	Candidate	Votes	%
Republican	Ron Kresha (incumbent)	15,946	96.31
Write-in		611	3.69
Total votes		16,557	100%

==== District 10B ====
2022 Minnesota House of Representatives District 10B election
Party	Candidate	Votes	%
Republican	Isaac Schultz	15,082	78.55
Democratic (DFL)	Hunter Froelich	4,089	21.30
Write-in		29	0.15
Total votes		19,200	100%

==== District 11A ====
2022 Minnesota House of Representatives District 11A election
Party	Candidate	Votes	%
Republican	Jeff Dotseth	9,510	51.16
Democratic (DFL)	Pete Radosevich	9,056	48.71
Write-in		24	0.13
Total votes		18,590	100%

==== District 11B ====
2022 Minnesota House of Representatives District 11B election
Party	Candidate	Votes	%
Republican	Nathan Nelson (incumbent)	12,136	68.36
Democratic (DFL)	Eric Olson	5,603	31.56
Write-in		13	0.07
Total votes		17,752	100%

==== District 12A ====
2022 Minnesota House of Representatives District 12A election
Party	Candidate	Votes	%
Republican	Paul Anderson (incumbent)	13,281	71.07
Democratic (DFL)	Edie Barrett	5,388	28.83
Write-in		18	0.10
Total votes		18,687	100%

==== District 12B ====
2022 Minnesota House of Representatives District 12B election
Party	Candidate	Votes	%
Republican	Mary Franson (incumbent)	18,687	69.89
Democratic (DFL)	Jeremy Vinar	5,908	30.02
Write-in		17	0.09
Total votes		19,681	100%

==== District 13A ====
2022 Minnesota House of Representatives District 13A election
Party	Candidate	Votes	%
Republican	Lisa Demuth (incumbent)	15,190	74.01
Democratic (DFL)	Andrea Robinson	5,324	25.94
Write-in		11	0.05
Total votes		20,525	100%

==== District 13B ====
2022 Minnesota House of Representatives District 13B election
Party	Candidate	Votes	%
Republican	Tim O'Driscoll (incumbent)	12,256	66.75
Democratic (DFL)	Melissa Bromenschenkel	6,092	33.18
Write-in		14	0.08
Total votes		18,362	100%

==== District 14A ====
2022 Minnesota House of Representatives District 14A election
Party	Candidate	Votes	%
Republican	Bernie Perryman	7,259	50.64
Democratic (DFL)	Tamara Calhoun	7,060	49.25
Write-in		15	0.10
Total votes		14,334	100%

==== District 14B ====
2022 Minnesota House of Representatives District 14B election
Party	Candidate	Votes	%
Democratic (DFL)	Dan Wolgamott (incumbent)	7,652	51.80
Republican	Aaron Henning	7,112	48.14
Write-in		9	0.06
Total votes		14,773	100%

==== District 15A ====
2022 Minnesota House of Representatives District 15A election
Party	Candidate	Votes	%
Republican	Chris Swedzinski (incumbent)	12,446	70.39
Democratic (DFL)	Keith VanOverbeke	5,225	29.55
Write-in		11	0.06
Total votes		17,682	100%

==== District 15B ====
2022 Minnesota House of Representatives District 15B election
Party	Candidate	Votes	%
Republican	Paul Torkelson (incumbent)	13,445	72.56
Democratic (DFL)	Tom Kuster	5,075	27.39
Write-in		10	0.05
Total votes		18,530	100%

==== District 16A ====
2022 Minnesota House of Representatives District 16A election
Party	Candidate	Votes	%
Republican	Dean Urdahl (incumbent)	12,986	73.27
Democratic (DFL)	Robert Wright	4,714	26.60
Write-in		24	0.14
Total votes		17,724	100%

==== District 16B ====
2022 Minnesota House of Representatives District 16B election
Party	Candidate	Votes	%
Republican	Dave Baker (incumbent)	12,840	72.78
Democratic (DFL)	Fred Cogelow	4,795	27.18
Write-in		8	0.05
Total votes		17,643	100%

==== District 17A ====
2022 Minnesota House of Representatives District 17A election
Party	Candidate	Votes	%
Republican	Dawn Gillman	13,431	70.25
Democratic (DFL)	Jennifer Carpentier	5,659	29.60
Write-in		29	0.15
Total votes		19,119	100%

==== District 17B ====
2022 Minnesota House of Representatives District 17B election
Party	Candidate	Votes	%
Republican	Bobbie Harder	15,952	96.74
Write-in		538	3.26
Total votes		16,490	100%

==== District 18A ====
2022 Minnesota House of Representatives District 18A election
Party	Candidate	Votes	%
Democratic (DFL)	Jeff Brand	9,530	51.04
Republican	Susan Akland (incumbent)	9,119	48.84
Write-in		23	0.12
Total votes		18,672	100%

==== District 18B ====
2022 Minnesota House of Representatives District 18B election
Party	Candidate	Votes	%
Democratic (DFL)	Luke Frederick (incumbent)	8,564	60.13
Republican	Dar Vosburg	5,664	39.77
Write-in		15	0.11
Total votes		14,243	100%

==== District 19A ====
2022 Minnesota House of Representatives District 19A election
Party	Candidate	Votes	%
Republican	Brian Daniels (incumbent)	10,614	64.91
Democratic (DFL)	Carolyn Treadway	5,724	35.00
Write-in		15	0.09
Total votes		16,353	100%

==== District 19B ====
2022 Minnesota House of Representatives District 19B election
Party	Candidate	Votes	%
Republican	John Petersburg (incumbent)	12,765	71.12
Democratic (DFL)	Abdulahi Ali Osman	5,166	28.78
Write-in		18	0.10
Total votes		17,949	100%

==== District 20A ====
2022 Minnesota House of Representatives District 20A election
Party	Candidate	Votes	%
Republican	Pam Altendorf	10,607	51.79
Democratic (DFL)	Laurel Stinson	7,698	37.59
Independent	Roger Kittelson	2,158	10.54
Write-in		18	0.09
Total votes		20,481	100%

==== District 20B ====
2022 Minnesota House of Representatives District 20B election
Party	Candidate	Votes	%
Republican	Steve Jacob	13,375	66.09
Democratic (DFL)	Elise Diesslin	6,845	33.82
Write-in		19	0.09
Total votes		20,239	100%

==== District 21A ====
2022 Minnesota House of Representatives District 21A election
Party	Candidate	Votes	%
Republican	Joe Schomacker (incumbent)	13,536	74.29
Democratic (DFL)	Pat Baustian	4,671	25.64
Write-in		14	0.08
Total votes		18,221	100%

==== District 21B ====
2022 Minnesota House of Representatives District 21B election
Party	Candidate	Votes	%
Republican	Marj Fogelman	9,437	66.50
Democratic (DFL)	Michael Heidelberger	4,728	33.32
Write-in		26	0.18
Total votes		14,191	100%

==== District 22A ====
2022 Minnesota House of Representatives District 22A election
Party	Candidate	Votes	%
Republican	Bjorn Olson (incumbent)	12,221	69.04
Democratic (DFL)	Marisa Ulmen	5,467	30.88
Write-in		14	0.08
Total votes		17,702	100%

==== District 22B ====
2022 Minnesota House of Representatives District 22B election
Party	Candidate	Votes	%
Republican	Brian Pfarr (incumbent)	13,225	68.67
Democratic (DFL)	Marcia Stapleton	6,023	31.27
Write-in		11	0.06
Total votes		19,259	100%

==== District 23A ====
2022 Minnesota House of Representatives District 23A election
Party	Candidate	Votes	%
Republican	Peggy Bennett (incumbent)	12,038	65.75
Democratic (DFL)	Mary Hinnenkamp	6,252	34.15
Write-in		19	0.10
Total votes		18,309	100%

==== District 23B ====
2022 Minnesota House of Representatives District 23B election
Party	Candidate	Votes	%
Republican	Patricia Mueller (incumbent)	8,336	55.02
Democratic (DFL)	Tom Stiehm	6,786	44.79
Write-in		28	0.18
Total votes		15,150	100%

==== District 24A ====
2022 Minnesota House of Representatives District 24A election
Party	Candidate	Votes	%
Republican	Duane Quam (incumbent)	12,015	63.97
Democratic (DFL)	Keith McLain	6,758	35.98
Write-in		8	0.04
Total votes		18,781	100%

==== District 24B ====
2022 Minnesota House of Representatives District 24B election
Party	Candidate	Votes	%
Democratic (DFL)	Tina Liebling (incumbent)	9,922	56.40
Republican	Katrina Pulham	7,661	43.55
Write-in		8	0.05
Total votes		17,591	100%

==== District 25A ====
2022 Minnesota House of Representatives District 25A election
Party	Candidate	Votes	%
Democratic (DFL)	Kim Hicks	9,797	55.21
Republican	Wendy Phillips	7,938	44.73
Write-in		10	0.06
Total votes		17,745	100%

==== District 25B ====
2022 Minnesota House of Representatives District 25B election
Party	Candidate	Votes	%
Democratic (DFL)	Andy Smith	10,040	64.04
Republican	John Robinson	5,634	35.94
Write-in		3	0.02
Total votes		15,677	100%

==== District 26A ====
2022 Minnesota House of Representatives District 26A election
Party	Candidate	Votes	%
Democratic (DFL)	Gene Pelowski (incumbent)	9,456	55.04
Republican	Stephen James Doerr	7,704	44.85
Write-in		19	0.11
Total votes		17,179	100%

==== District 26B ====
2022 Minnesota House of Representatives District 26B election
Party	Candidate	Votes	%
Republican	Greg Davids	15,038	94.67
Write-in		847	5.33
Total votes		15,885	100%

==== District 27A ====
2022 Minnesota House of Representatives District 27A election
Party	Candidate	Votes	%
Republican	Shane Mekeland (incumbent)	13,288	70.95
Democratic (DFL)	Ronald Thiessen	5,434	29.01
Write-in		7	0.04
Total votes		18,729	100%

==== District 27B ====
2022 Minnesota House of Representatives District 27B election
Party	Candidate	Votes	%
Republican	Kurt Daudt (incumbent)	13,249	73.23
Democratic (DFL)	Brad Brown	4,815	26.61
Write-in		29	0.16
Total votes		18,093	100%

==== District 28A ====
2022 Minnesota House of Representatives District 28A election
Party	Candidate	Votes	%
Republican	Brian Johnson (incumbent)	12,903	68.03
Democratic (DFL)	Erik Johnson	6,043	31.86
Write-in		20	0.``
Total votes		18,966	100%

==== District 28B ====
Incumbent Republican Anne Neu Brindley ran for re-election. District 28B covers the southern portion of Chisago County and includes the cities of Lindström, Chisago City, and Stacy, as well as the eastern part of North Branch.

2022 Minnesota House of Representatives District 28B election
Party	Candidate	Votes	%
Republican	Anne Neu Brindley (incumbent)	12,260	62.11
Democratic (DFL)	Katie Malchow	7,471	37.85
Write-in		9	0.05
Total votes		19,740	100%

==== District 29A ====
2022 Minnesota House of Representatives District 29A election
Party	Candidate	Votes	%
Republican	Joe McDonald (incumbent)	14,798	70.68
Democratic (DFL)	Sherri Leyda	6,115	29.21
Write-in		24	0.11
Total votes		20,937	100%

==== District 29B ====
2022 Minnesota House of Representatives District 29B election
Party	Candidate	Votes	%
Republican	Marion O'Neill (incumbent)	13,665	95.82
Write-in		596	4.18
Total votes		14,261	100%

==== District 30A ====
2022 Minnesota House of Representatives District 29A election
Party	Candidate	Votes	%
Republican	Walter Hudson	12,729	62.65
Democratic (DFL)	Sonja Buckmeier	7,570	37.26
Write-in		18	0.09
Total votes		20,299	100%

==== District 30B ====
2022 Minnesota House of Representatives District 30B election
Party	Candidate	Votes	%
Republican	Paul Novotny (incumbent)	12,866	65.57
Democratic (DFL)	Chad Hobot	6,751	34.40
Write-in		6	0.03
Total votes		19,623	100%

==== District 31A ====
2022 Minnesota House of Representatives District 31A election
Party	Candidate	Votes	%
Republican	Harry Niska	11,638	59.51
Democratic (DFL)	Betsy O'Berry	7,904	40.42
Write-in		16	0.08
Total votes		19,557	100%

==== District 31B ====
2022 Minnesota House of Representatives District 31B election
Party	Candidate	Votes	%
Republican	Peggy Scott (incumbent)	14,161	68.08
Democratic (DFL)	Bill Fisher	6,630	31.87
Write-in		11	0.05
Total votes		20,802	100%

==== District 32A ====
2022 Minnesota House of Representatives District 32A election
Party	Candidate	Votes	%
Republican	Nolan West (incumbent)	11,067	57.25
Democratic (DFL)	Ashton Ramsammy	8,247	42.66
Write-in		16	0.08
Total votes		19,330	100%

==== District 32B ====
2022 Minnesota House of Representatives District 32B election
Party	Candidate	Votes	%
Democratic (DFL)	Matt Norris	9,098	51.12
Republican	Donald Raleigh (incumbent)	8,685	48.79
Write-in		16	0.09
Total votes		17,799	100%

==== District 33A ====
2022 Minnesota House of Representatives District 33A election
Party	Candidate	Votes	%
Republican	Patti Anderson	11,694	55.40
Democratic (DFL)	Hannah Valento	9,404	44.55
Write-in		9	0.04
Total votes		21,107	100%

==== District 33B ====
2022 Minnesota House of Representatives District 33B election
Party	Candidate	Votes	%
Democratic (DFL)	Josiah Hill	12,074	53.94
Republican	Mark Bishofsky	10,277	45.91
Write-in		33	0.15
Total votes		22,384	100%

==== District 34A ====
2022 Minnesota House of Representatives District 34A election
Party	Candidate	Votes	%
Republican	Danny Nadeau	11,339	53.36
Democratic (DFL)	Brian Raines	9,903	46.60
Write-in		9	0.04
Total votes		21,251	100%

==== District 34B ====
2022 Minnesota House of Representatives District 34B election
Party	Candidate	Votes	%
Democratic (DFL)	Melissa Hortman (incumbent)	10,469	62.48
Republican	Scott Simmons	6,268	37.41
Write-in		19	0.11
Total votes		16,756	100%

==== District 35A ====
2022 Minnesota House of Representatives District 35A election
Party	Candidate	Votes	%
Democratic (DFL)	Zack Stephenson (incumbent)	9,043	52.44
Republican	John Heinrich (incumbent)	8,187	47.47
Write-in		16	0.09
Total votes		17,246	100%

==== District 35B ====
2022 Minnesota House of Representatives District 35B election
Party	Candidate	Votes	%
Democratic (DFL)	Jerry Newton	8,651	50.64
Republican	Polly Matteson	8,419	49.29
Write-in		12	0.07
Total votes		17,802	100%

==== District 36A ====
2022 Minnesota House of Representatives District 36A election
Party	Candidate	Votes	%
Republican	Elliott Engen	11,705	51.39
Democratic (DFL)	Susie Strom	11,063	48.57
Write-in		10	0.04
Total votes		22,148	100%

==== District 36B ====
2022 Minnesota House of Representatives District 36B election
Party	Candidate	Votes	%
Democratic (DFL)	Brion Curran	11,337	53.48
Republican	Heidi Gunderson	9,833	46.38
Write-in		29	0.14
Total votes		21,199	100%

==== District 37A ====
2022 Minnesota House of Representatives District 37A election
Party	Candidate	Votes	%
Republican	Kristin Robbins (incumbent)	12,637	56.11
Democratic (DFL)	Caitlin Cahill	9,872	43.83
Write-in		12	0.05
Total votes		22,521	100%

==== District 37B ====
2022 Minnesota House of Representatives District 37B election
Party	Candidate	Votes	%
Democratic (DFL)	Kristin Bahner	12,293	55.61
Republican	John Bristol	9,802	44.34
Write-in		11	0.05
Total votes		22,106	100%

==== District 38A ====
2022 Minnesota House of Representatives District 38A election
Party	Candidate	Votes	%
Democratic (DFL)	Mike Nelson (incumbent)	8,252	95.65
Write-in		375	4.35
Total votes		8,627	100%

==== District 38B ====
2022 Minnesota House of Representatives District 38B election
Party	Candidate	Votes	%
Democratic (DFL)	Samantha Vang (incumbent)	7,753	72.73
Republican	Robert Marvin	2,892	27.13
Write-in		15	0.14
Total votes		10,660	100%

==== District 39A ====
2022 Minnesota House of Representatives District 39A election
Party	Candidate	Votes	%
Democratic (DFL)	Erin Koegel (incumbent)	9,091	63.30
Republican	Rod Sylvester	5,262	36.64
Write-in		9	0.06
Total votes		14,362	100%

==== District 39B ====
2022 Minnesota House of Representatives District 39B election
Party	Candidate	Votes	%
Democratic (DFL)	Sandra Feist (incumbent)	11,467	69.93
Republican	Mike Sharp	4,915	29.97
Write-in		15	0.09
Total votes		16,397	100%

==== District 40A ====
2022 Minnesota House of Representatives District 40A election
Party	Candidate	Votes	%
Democratic (DFL)	Kelly Moller (incumbent)	12,302	61.61
Republican	Ben Schwanke	7,652	38.32
Write-in		14	0.07
Total votes		19,968	100%

==== District 40B ====
2022 Minnesota House of Representatives District 40B election
Party	Candidate	Votes	%
Democratic (DFL)	Jamie Becker-Finn (incumbent)	13,997	67.72
Republican	Allen Shen	6,652	32.18
Write-in		20	0.10
Total votes		20,669	100%

==== District 41A ====
2022 Minnesota House of Representatives District 41A election
Party	Candidate	Votes	%
Republican	Mark Wiens	11,801	50.24
Democratic (DFL)	Pat Driscoll	11,673	49.69
Write-in		17	0.07
Total votes		23,491	100%

==== District 41B ====
2022 Minnesota House of Representatives District 41B election
Party	Candidate	Votes	%
Republican	Shane Hudella	9,783	51.05
Democratic (DFL)	Tina Folch	9,365	48.87
Write-in		17	0.09
Total votes		19,165	100%

==== District 42A ====
2022 Minnesota House of Representatives District 42A election
Party	Candidate	Votes	%
Democratic (DFL)	Ned Carroll	12,018	58.30
Republican	Kathy Burkett	8,587	41.66
Write-in		9	0.04
Total votes		20,704	100%

==== District 42B ====
2022 Minnesota House of Representatives District 42B election
Party	Candidate	Votes	%
Democratic (DFL)	Ginny Klevorn (incumbent)	12,422	60.59
Republican	Jackie Schroeder	8,071	39.37
Write-in		9	0.04
Total votes		20,502	100%

==== District 43A ====
2022 Minnesota House of Representatives District 43A election
Party	Candidate	Votes	%
Democratic (DFL)	Cedrick Frazier (incumbent)	12,266	96.64
Write-in		427	3.36
Total votes		12,653	100%

==== District 43B ====
2022 Minnesota House of Representatives District 43B election
Party	Candidate	Votes	%
Democratic (DFL)	Mike Freiberg (incumbent)	17,141	97.53
Write-in		434	2.47
Total votes		17,575	100%

==== District 44A ====
2022 Minnesota House of Representatives District 44A election
Party	Candidate	Votes	%
Democratic (DFL)	Peter Fischer (incumbent)	9,918	62.84
Republican	Alex Pinkney	5,851	37.07
Write-in		15	0.10
Total votes		15,784	100%

==== District 44B ====
2022 Minnesota House of Representatives District 44B election
Party	Candidate	Votes	%
Democratic (DFL)	Leon Lillie (incumbent)	9,197	56.60
Republican	William Johnston	6,260	38.52
Libertarian	T. J. Hawthorne	785	4.83
Write-in		8	0.05
Total votes		16,250	100%

==== District 45A ====
2022 Minnesota House of Representatives District 45A election
Party	Candidate	Votes	%
Republican	Andrew Myers	12,830	53.03
Democratic (DFL)	Lauren Bresnahan	11,356	46.94
Write-in		8	0.03
Total votes		24,194	100%

==== District 45B ====
2022 Minnesota House of Representatives District 45B election
Party	Candidate	Votes	%
Democratic (DFL)	Patty Acomb (incumbent)	14,915	62.05
Republican	Lorie Cousineau	9,108	37.89
Write-in		14	0.06
Total votes		24,037	100%

==== District 46A ====
2022 Minnesota House of Representatives District 46A election
Party	Candidate	Votes	%
Democratic (DFL)	Larry Kraft	16,013	97.88
Write-in		347	2.12
Total votes		16,360	100%

==== District 46B ====
2022 Minnesota House of Representatives District 46B election
Party	Candidate	Votes	%
Democratic (DFL)	Cheryl Youakim (incumbent)	14,738	97.12
Write-in		437	2.88
Total votes		15,175	100%

==== District 47A ====
2022 Minnesota House of Representatives District 47A election
Party	Candidate	Votes	%
Democratic (DFL)	Amanda Hemmingsen-Jaeger	11,426	60.18
Republican	Bob Lawrence	7,550	39.77
Write-in		10	0.05
Total votes		18,986	100%

==== District 47B ====
2022 Minnesota House of Representatives District 47B election
Party	Candidate	Votes	%
Democratic (DFL)	Ethan Cha	10,627	53.13
Republican	Kelly Fenton	9,362	46.81
Write-in		13	0.06
Total votes		20,002	100%

==== District 48A ====
2022 Minnesota House of Representatives District 48A election
Party	Candidate	Votes	%
Republican	Jim Nash (incumbent)	13,018	59.66
Democratic (DFL)	Nathan Kells	8,785	40.26
Write-in		19	0.09
Total votes		21,822	100%

==== District 48B ====
2022 Minnesota House of Representatives District 48B election
Party	Candidate	Votes	%
Democratic (DFL)	Lucy Rehm	10,632	50.97
Republican	Greg Boe (incumbent)	10,215	48.97
Write-in		13	0.06
Total votes		20,860	100%

==== District 49A ====
2022 Minnesota House of Representatives District 49A election
Party	Candidate	Votes	%
Democratic (DFL)	Laurie Pryor (incumbent)	14,213	63.00
Republican	Ryan Chase	8,331	36.93
Write-in		16	0.07
Total votes		22,560	100%

==== District 49B ====
2022 Minnesota House of Representatives District 49B election
Party	Candidate	Votes	%
Democratic (DFL)	Carlie Kotyza-Witthuhn (incumbent)	11,406	57.62
Republican	Thomas Knecht	8,374	42.30
Write-in		15	0.08
Total votes		19,795	100%

==== District 50A ====
2022 Minnesota House of Representatives District 50A election
Party	Candidate	Votes	%
Democratic (DFL)	Heather Edelson (incumbent)	15,087	68.57
Republican	Sami Cisman	6,882	31.28
Write-in		32	0.15
Total votes		21,969	100%

==== District 50B ====
In the DFL primary for District 50B, incumbent Steve Elkins (formerly representing District 49B) defeated fellow incumbent Andrew Carlson (of the old District 50B) with over 60% of the vote.

2022 Minnesota House of Representatives District 50B election
Party	Candidate	Votes	%
Democratic (DFL)	Steve Elkins (incumbent)	14,425	63.05
Republican	Beth Beebe	8,437	36.88
Write-in		15	0.07
Total votes		22,877	100%

==== District 51A ====
2022 Minnesota House of Representatives District 51A election
Party	Candidate	Votes	%
Democratic (DFL)	Michael Howard (incumbent)	12,524	74.16
Republican	Ryan Wiskerchen	4,339	25.69
Write-in		25	0.15
Total votes		16,888	100%

==== District 51B ====
2022 Minnesota House of Representatives District 51B election
Party	Candidate	Votes	%
Democratic (DFL)	Nathan Coulter	10,041	61.57
Republican	Chad Anderson	6,249	38.32
Write-in		19	0.12
Total votes		16,309	100%

==== District 52A ====
2022 Minnesota House of Representatives District 52A election
Party	Candidate	Votes	%
Democratic (DFL)	Liz Reyer (incumbent)	11,357	61.99
Republican	Fern Smith	6,942	37.89
Write-in		21	0.11
Total votes		18,320	100%

==== District 52B ====
2022 Minnesota House of Representatives District 52B election
Party	Candidate	Votes	%
Democratic (DFL)	Ruth Richardson (incumbent)	13,933	61.67
Republican	Cynthia Lonnquist	8,636	38.23
Write-in		23	0.10
Total votes		22,592	100%

==== District 53A ====
2022 Minnesota House of Representatives District 53A election
Party	Candidate	Votes	%
Democratic (DFL)	Mary Frances Clardy	10,777	54.51
Republican	Todd Kruse	8,188	41.41
Legal Marijuana Now	Brent Jacobson	785	3.97
Write-in		22	0.11
Total votes		19,772	100%

==== District 53B ====
2022 Minnesota House of Representatives District 53B election
Party	Candidate	Votes	%
Democratic (DFL)	Rick Hansen (incumbent)	9,290	54.36
Republican	Steven Swoboda	6,713	39.28
Legal Marijuana Now	Laura Pride	1,074	6.28
Write-in		14	0.08
Total votes		17,091	100%

==== District 54A ====
2022 Minnesota House of Representatives District 53A election
Party	Candidate	Votes	%
Democratic (DFL)	Brad Tabke	8,243	51.78
Republican	Erik Mortensen (incumbent)	6,923	43.49
Legal Marijuana Now	Ryan Martin	690	4.33
Write-in		63	0.40
Total votes		15,919	100%

==== District 54B ====
2022 Minnesota House of Representatives District 54B election
Party	Candidate	Votes	%
Republican	Ben Bakeberg	12,317	60.70
Democratic (DFL)	Brendan Van Alstyne	7,962	39.24
Write-in		14	0.07
Total votes		20,293	100%

==== District 55A ====
2022 Minnesota House of Representatives District 55A election
Party	Candidate	Votes	%
Democratic (DFL)	Jessica Hanson (incumbent)	9,668	53.04
Republican	Gabriela Kroetch	8,549	46.90
Write-in		12	0.07
Total votes		18,229	100%

==== District 55B ====
2022 Minnesota House of Representatives District 55B election
Party	Candidate	Votes	%
Democratic (DFL)	Kaela Berg (incumbent)	9,288	58.24
Republican	Van Holston	6,601	41.52
Write-in		11	0.07
Total votes		15,900	100%

==== District 56A ====
2022 Minnesota House of Representatives District 56A election
Party	Candidate	Votes	%
Democratic (DFL)	Robert Bierman (incumbent)	10,786	60.02
Republican	Joe Landru	7,168	39.89
Write-in		16	0.09
Total votes		17,970	100%

==== District 56B ====
2022 Minnesota House of Representatives District 56B election
Party	Candidate	Votes	%
Democratic (DFL)	John Huot (incumbent)	11,854	55.57
Republican	Joe Scanlon	9,455	44.33
Write-in		21	0.10
Total votes		21,330	100%

==== District 57A ====
2022 Minnesota House of Representatives District 57A election
Party	Candidate	Votes	%
Republican	Jon Koznick (incumbent)	13,039	62.53
Democratic (DFL)	Greg Henningsen	7,792	37.36
Write-in		23	0.11
Total votes		20,854	100%

==== District 57B ====
2022 Minnesota House of Representatives District 57B election
Party	Candidate	Votes	%
Republican	Jeff Witte	10,466	51.61
Democratic (DFL)	Erin Preese	9,790	48.28
Write-in		22	0.11
Total votes		20,278	100%

==== District 58A ====
2022 Minnesota House of Representatives District 58A election
Party	Candidate	Votes	%
Democratic (DFL)	Kristi Pursell	11,362	54.48
Republican	Gary Bruggenthies	9,481	45.46
Write-in		13	0.06
Total votes		20,856	100%

==== District 58B ====
2022 Minnesota House of Representatives District 58B election
Party	Candidate	Votes	%
Republican	Pat Garofalo (incumbent)	11,919	62.43
Democratic (DFL)	Steve Dungy	7,155	37.47
Write-in		19	0.10
Total votes		19,093	100%

==== District 59A ====
2022 Minnesota House of Representatives District 59A election
Party	Candidate	Votes	%
Democratic (DFL)	Fue Lee (incumbent)	8,960	98.10
Write-in		170	1.90
Total votes		9,134	100%

==== District 59B ====
2022 Minnesota House of Representatives District 59B election
Party	Candidate	Votes	%
Democratic (DFL)	Esther Agbaje (incumbent)	13,225	98.51
Write-in		200	1.49
Total votes		13,425	100%

==== District 60A ====
Incumbent Sydney Jordan was first elected in a 2020 special election caused by the death of DFL member Diane Loeffler.

2022 Minnesota House of Representatives District 60A election
Party	Candidate	Votes	%
Democratic (DFL)	Sydney Jordan (incumbent)	17,396	86.85
Republican	Diana Halsey	2,584	12.90
Write-in		50	0.25
Total votes		20,030	100%

==== District 60B ====
2022 Minnesota House of Representatives District 60B election
Party	Candidate	Votes	%
Democratic (DFL)	Mohamud Noor (incumbent)	9,039	98.74
Write-in		115	1.26
Total votes		9,154	100%
Democratic (DFL) hold			

==== District 61A ====
2022 Minnesota House of Representatives District 61A election
Party	Candidate	Votes	%
Democratic (DFL)	Frank Hornstein (incumbent)	15,848	98.80
Write-in		193	1.20
Total votes		16,041	100%

==== District 61B ====
2022 Minnesota House of Representatives District 61B election
Party	Candidate	Votes	%
Democratic (DFL)	Jamie Long (incumbent)	21,030	98.89
Write-in		236	1.11
Total votes		21,266	100%

==== District 62A ====
2022 Minnesota House of Representatives District 62A election
Party	Candidate	Votes	%
Democratic (DFL)	Aisha Gomez (incumbent)	10,961	98.77
Write-in		137	1.23
Total votes		11,098	100%

==== District 62B ====
2022 Minnesota House of Representatives District 62B election
Party	Candidate	Votes	%
Democratic (DFL)	Hodan Hassan (incumbent)	13,138	90.28
Republican	Taylor Hammond	1,383	9.50
Write-in		32	0.22
Total votes		14,553	100%

==== District 63A ====
2022 Minnesota House of Representatives District 63A election
Party	Candidate	Votes	%
Democratic (DFL)	Samantha Sencer-Mura	19,398	90.16
Republican	Kyle Bragg	2,087	9.70
Write-in		31	0.14
Total votes		21,516	100%

==== District 63B ====
2022 Minnesota House of Representatives District 63B election
Party	Candidate	Votes	%
Democratic (DFL)	Emma Greenman	20,339	98.67
Write-in		274	1.33
Total votes		20,613	100%

==== District 64A ====
2022 Minnesota House of Representatives District 64A election
Party	Candidate	Votes	%
Democratic (DFL)	Kaohly Her (incumbent)	18,080	85.11
Republican	Dan Walsh	3,128	14.73
Write-in		34	0.16
Total votes		21,242	100%

==== District 64B ====
2022 Minnesota House of Representatives District 64B election
Party	Candidate	Votes	%
Democratic (DFL)	Dave Pinto (incumbent)	18,126	82.59
Republican	Lorraine Englund	3,790	17.27
Write-in		31	0.14
Total votes		21,947	100%

==== District 65A ====
2022 Minnesota House of Representatives District 65A election
Party	Candidate	Votes	%
Democratic (DFL)	Samakab Hussein	7,018	71.21
Republican	John Schonebaum	1,522	15.44
Legal Marijuana Now	Miki Frost	1,302	13.21
Write-in		13	0.13
Total votes		9,855	100%

==== District 65B ====
2022 Minnesota House of Representatives District 65B election
Party	Candidate	Votes	%
Democratic (DFL)	María Isa Pérez-Hedges	11,955	78.54
Republican	Kevin Fjelsted	3,247	21.33
Write-in		19	0.12
Total votes		15,221	100%

==== District 66A ====
District 66A includes parts of north eastern Saint Paul as well as Roseville, Falcon Heights, and Lauderdale. Incumbent DFLer Alice Hausman retired. Leigh Finke, the DFL endorsed candidate, became the first transgender member of the Minnesota Legislature.

2022 Minnesota House of Representatives District 66A election
Party	Candidate	Votes	%
Democratic (DFL)	Leigh Finke	15,635	81.14
Republican	Trace Johnson	3,569	18.52
Write-in		64	0.33
Total votes		19,268	100%

==== District 66B ====
House District 66B covers north central Saint Paul. Incumbent Athena Hollins ran for re-election.

2022 Minnesota House of Representatives District 66B election
Party	Candidate	Votes	%
Democratic (DFL)	Athena Hollins (incumbent)	8,640	78.42
Republican	Jay Hill	2,364	21.46
Write-in		14	0.13
Total votes		11,018	100%

==== District 67A ====
District 67A includes the northeast corner of Saint Paul. The incumbent John Thompson failed to secure the DFL endorsement after a string of scandals. He received only 11% of the vote in the primary election, losing to Liz Lee. Following the primary, the Republican nominee, Beverly Peterson, died, and Scott Hesselgrave was chosen as the new nominee.

2022 Minnesota House of Representatives District 67A election
Party	Candidate	Votes	%
Democratic (DFL)	Liz Lee	6,320	75.13
Republican	Scott Hesselgrave	2,077	24.69
Write-in		15	0.18
Total votes		8,412	100%

==== District 67B ====
District 67B covers the easternmost portion of Saint Paul. Incumbent Jay Xiong ran for re-election. He was first elected in 2018.

2022 Minnesota House of Representatives District 67B election
Party	Candidate	Votes	%
Democratic (DFL)	Jay Xiong (incumbent)	7,702	75.17
Republican	Fred Turk	2,527	24.66
Write-in		17	0.17
Total votes		10,246	100%

== See also ==
- 2022 Minnesota Senate election
- 2022 Minnesota gubernatorial election
- 2022 Minnesota elections
- List of Minnesota state legislatures
