= 2015 Minnesota House of Representatives district 3A special election =

District 3A special election, 2015
- December 8, 2015

The District 3A seat in the Minnesota House of Representatives
Nominee	Rob Ecklund	Roger Skraba	Kelsey Johnson
Party	Democratic (DFL)	Republican	Independent
Popular vote	4,591	1,399	1,144
Percentage	63.39%	19.32%	15.79%
- Precinct Results Ecklund: 30-40% 40-50% 50-60% 60-70% 70-80% 80-90% 90-100% Skraba: 40-50% 50-60% Johnson: 50-60% No Vote
Representative before election
David Dill
Democratic (DFL)
Elected Representative
Rob Ecklund
Democratic (DFL)

A special election was held in the U.S. state of Minnesota on December 8, 2015, to elect a new representative for District 3A in the Minnesota House of Representatives, caused by the death of Representative David Dill on August 8, 2015. A primary election was held on September 29, 2015, to nominate a Minnesota Democratic–Farmer–Labor Party (DFL) candidate. Rob Ecklund, the DFL nominee, won the special election.

== Candidates ==
=== Republican Party of Minnesota ===
- Roger Skraba, former mayor and city councilor of Ely.

=== Minnesota Democratic–Farmer–Labor Party ===
- Rob Ecklund, Koochiching County commissioner.
- Bill Hansen, businessman. Contested the 2002 and 2004 District 6A elections as the DFL endorsed candidate, losing the DFL nomination both times to David Dill.
- Eric Johnson, businessman. Contested the 2014 District 3A election as the Republican nominee.
- Heidi Omerza, Ely city councilor.

=== Independents ===
- Kelsey Johnson, lobbyist; director of state affairs for the Grocery Manufacturers Association.

== Primary election ==
The DFL did not hold an endorsing convention that was originally scheduled for September 19. In announcing his decision to cancel the event, Senate District 3 DFL chair Paul Fish said that "[t]he voters of 3A deserve the opportunity to select the DFL candidate who best represents their interests. Therefore, a DFL endorsing convention for the 3A seat will not be held. Participation in the Sept. 29 primary is encouraged." Cook County DFL chair Anton Moody, Lake County DFL chair Marlys Wisch, and St. Louis County DFL chair Kirsten Larsen, whose counties include District 3A, said that they disagreed with the decision, citing a lack of transparency. The decision also upset DFL candidate Bill Hansen, who was considered to be the front-runner for the party endorsement.

=== Results ===
District 3A special primary election, 2015
Party	Candidate	Votes	%
Republican Party of Minnesota	Roger Skraba	576	100.00
Minnesota Democratic–Farmer–Labor Party	Rob Ecklund	3,083	43.71
Minnesota Democratic–Farmer–Labor Party	Bill Hansen	2,637	37.39
Minnesota Democratic–Farmer–Labor Party	Eric Johnson	678	9.61
Minnesota Democratic–Farmer–Labor Party	Heidi Omerza	655	9.29
Minnesota Democratic–Farmer–Labor Party	Subtotal	7,053	100.00
Total		7,629	100.00
Invalid/blank votes		124	1.60
Turnout (out of 24,668 registered voters)		7,753	31.43

== Results ==
Minnesota House of Representatives District 3A special election, 2015
Party	Candidate	Votes	%	∆pp
Minnesota Democratic–Farmer–Labor Party	Rob Ecklund	4,591	63.39	−2.16
Republican Party of Minnesota	Roger Skraba	1,399	19.32	−14.89
Independent	Kelsey Johnson	1,144	15.79	+15.79
Write-in	N/A	109	1.50	+1.26
Total		7,243	100.00	±0.00

== Previous election results ==
Minnesota House of Representatives election, 2014: District 3A
Party	Candidate	Votes	%	∆pp
Minnesota Democratic–Farmer–Labor Party	David Dill	12,067	65.55	−1.20
Republican Party of Minnesota	Eric Johnson	6,297	34.21	+1.33
Write-in	N/A	45	0.24	−0.13
Total		18,409	100.00	±0.00

== See also ==
- List of special elections to the Minnesota House of Representatives
