= Roger Skraba =

American politician

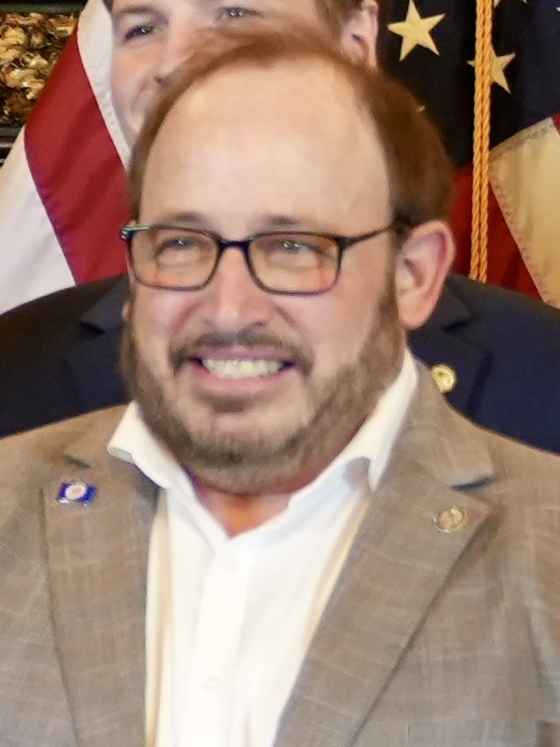

Member of the Minnesota House of Representatives from the 3A district
- Incumbent
- Assumed office January 3, 2023
- Preceded by: Rob Ecklund

Personal details
- Born: November 29, 1961 (age 64) Ely, Minnesota, U.S.
- Party: Republican
- Education: North Dakota State University (BA)
- Occupation: Business owner; Legislator
- Website: Government website Campaign website

Military service
- Branch/service: United States Army
- Years of service: 1986-1994
- Rank: Sergeant

Roger J. Skraba (/ˈskrɑːbə/ SKRAH-bə; born November 29, 1961) is an American politician serving in the Minnesota House of Representatives since 2023. A member of the Republican Party of Minnesota, Skraba represents District 3A in northern Minnesota, which includes the cities of International Falls and Ely, and parts or all of Cook, Itasca, Koochiching, Lake, and St. Louis Counties.

== Early life, education and career ==
Born in Ely, Minnesota, Skraba graduated from Ely Memorial High School and from North Dakota State University with a bachelor's degree in construction management. Skraba served in the United States Army for nine years, attaining the rank of Sergeant.

Skraba served on the St. Louis County Board of Adjustment and Planning Commission. He was a member of the Ely City Council and was elected mayor of Ely four times, most recently in 2021.

Skraba, who was a DFLer before joining the Republican Party of Minnesota, endorsed candidate Jeff Anderson in the 2012 DFL primary to challenge Chip Cravaack for Minnesota's 8th Congressional District. After Anderson lost the primary to Rick Nolan, Skraba endorsed Cravaack.

== Minnesota House of Representatives ==
Skraba was elected to the Minnesota House of Representatives in 2022. He first ran for the state House in 2002 as the Independence Party nominee, finishing third behind Republican Tom Porter and Democrat David Dill. He ran again in a 2015 special election after Dill died, and lost to DFL nominee Rob Ecklund. Skraba defeated Ecklund in 2022 by 0.07 percent, triggering an automatic recount under state law, after which Skraba was declared the winner by 15 votes.

Skraba serves on the Capital Investment, Environment and Natural Resources Finance and Policy, and Legacy Finance Committees.

=== Political positions ===
In 2010, Skraba, a longtime supporter of the mining industry, urged then-Governor Mark Dayton to pick department heads sympathetic to mining projects. He has criticized environmentalists in the DFL party, saying that northern Minnesota has been hampered by onerous permitting processes for mining. Skraba opposed the Biden administration's decision to cancel leases for Twin Metals copper-nickel mine in the region.

Skraba, who has worked as a canoe guide, has supported northern Minnesota's tourism industry but said it "does not produce all the money Ely needs to function". He supported a 2023 infrastructure package that included over $40 million in funding for projects in northern Minnesota, saying it was "a good bill for the Northland". He co-sponsored a bill extending unemployment benefits to laid-off miners, which passed the legislature in 2023 with bipartisan support.

== Electoral history ==
2002 Minnesota State House - District 06A
Party	Candidate	Votes	%
Democratic (DFL)	David K. Dill	10,804	56.21
Republican	Tom Porter	4,318	22.46
Independence	Roger Skraba	3,945	20.52
Write-in		155	0.81
Total votes		19,222	100.00
Democratic (DFL) hold			

2015 Minnesota State House - District 3A Special Election
Party	Candidate	Votes	%
Democratic (DFL)	Rob Ecklund	4,591	63.39
Republican	Roger Skraba	1,399	19.32
Independent	Kelsey Johnson	1,144	15.79
Write-in		109	1.50
Total votes		7,243	100.0
Democratic (DFL) hold			

2022 Minnesota State House - District 3A
Party	Candidate	Votes	%
Republican	Roger Skraba	10,867	49.98
Democratic (DFL)	Rob Ecklund (incumbent)	10,852	49.91
Write-in		22	0.10
Total votes		21,741	100.0
Republican gain from Democratic (DFL)			

2024 Minnesota State House - District 3A
Party	Candidate	Votes	%
Republican	Roger Skraba	14,443	55.54
Democratic (DFL)	Harley Droba	10,779	41.45
Forward	Rich Tru	712	2.74
Write-in		73	0.28
Total votes		26,007	100.0
Republican hold			

== Personal life ==
Skraba lives in Ely, Minnesota. He is Catholic and attends St. Anthony's Catholic Church in Ely.

=== Legal issues ===
In 2010, while mayor of Ely, Skraba was sentenced in federal court after pleading guilty to driving his snowmobile in the restricted Boundary Waters Canoe Area Wilderness. He was also sentenced for breaking into a U.S. Forest Service shed and stealing a portable toilet, which he had hidden. He was fined $3,630, sentenced to 40 hours of community service, and placed on probation for two years. He has previously filed for bankruptcy.
