= Jeff Dotseth =

American politician

Member of the Minnesota House of Representatives from the 11A district
- Incumbent
- Assumed office January 3, 2023
- Preceded by: Mike Sundin
- Succeeded by: Chris Swanson (elect)

Personal details
- Party: Republican
- Spouse: Melissa
- Children: 3
- Occupation: Real estate; Small business owner; Farmer; Consultant; Legislator
- Website: Government website Campaign website

Jeff Dotseth is an American politician serving in the Minnesota House of Representatives since 2023. A member of the Republican Party of Minnesota, Dotseth represents District 11A in northeastern Minnesota, which includes the city of Cloquet, Thomson Township, and parts of Carlton, Pine and St. Louis Counties.

== Minnesota House of Representatives ==
Dotseth was elected to the Minnesota House of Representatives in 2022. He first ran unsuccessfully in 2018 against DFL incumbent Mike Sundin, then lost to him again in 2020. Dotseth defeated DFL nominee Pete Radosevich in 2022 after Sundin retired.

Dotseth serves on the Commerce Finance and Policy and Housing Finance and Policy Committees.

In 2025, Dotseth co-sponsored a bill to designate messenger RNA (mRNA) treatments, which include several COVID-19 vaccines, “weapons of mass destruction". The bill would make possessing or administering them a crime punishable by up to 20 years in prison. The bill was drafted by a Florida-based hypnotist and conspiracy theorist who believes that mRNA treatments are "nanoparticle injections" that amount to "biological and technological weapons of mass destruction".

At the 2026 election he was unseated by Democrat Chris Swanson.

== Electoral history ==
2018 Minnesota State House - District 11A
Party	Candidate	Votes	%
Democratic (DFL)	Mike Sundin (incumbent)	10,532	58.30
Republican	Jeff Dotseth	7,518	41.62
Write-in		14	0.08
Total votes		18,064	100.0
Democratic (DFL) hold			

2020 Minnesota State House - District 11A
Party	Candidate	Votes	%
Democratic (DFL)	Mike Sundin (incumbent)	11,452	51.41
Republican	Jeff Dotseth	10,798	48.48
Write-in		25	0.11
Total votes		22,275	100.0
Democratic (DFL) hold			

2022 Minnesota State House - District 11A
Party	Candidate	Votes	%
Republican	Jeff Dotseth	9,510	51.16
Democratic (DFL)	Pete Radosevich	9,056	48.71
Write-in		24	0.13
Total votes		18,590	100.0
Republican gain from Democratic (DFL)			

2024 Minnesota State House - District 11A
Party	Candidate	Votes	%
Republican	Jeff Dotseth	12,252	51.19
Democratic (DFL)	Pete Radosevich	11,588	48.41
Write-in		96	0.40
Total votes		23,936	100.0
Republican hold			

== Personal life ==
Dotseth lives in Kettle River, Minnesota, with his wife, Melissa, and three children.

In 2008, Dotseth was charged with abuse of his then wife, Penny Kowal. He denied the allegations and pleaded guilty to a lesser charge of disorderly conduct. Kowal said in an affidavit that Dotseth had choked, kicked, and hit her on several occasions over a decade, and also abused their dog. Dotseth's stepson also alleged that Dotseth had punched, choked, and hit him in violent outbursts. After a September 2024 Minnesota Star Tribune report on the matter, DFL leadership called for Dotseth to end his reelection campaign.
