= Wayne Johnson (Minnesota politician) =

American politician

Member of the Minnesota House of Representatives from the 41A district
- Incumbent
- Assumed office January 14, 2025
- Preceded by: Mark Wiens
- Succeeded by: Cole Birkeland (elect)

Personal details
- Party: Republican
- Spouse: MaryBeth
- Children: 2
- Education: A.S. in Accounting, Iowa Lakes Community College; B.S. in Accounting, Metropolitan State University
- Occupation: Business owner; Legislator
- Website: Campaign website

Wayne A. Johnson is an American politician and member of the Minnesota House of Representatives. A member of the Republican Party, he represents district 41A in the eastern Twin Cities metropolitan area, which includes the cities of Cottage Grove and Lake Elmo and other parts of Washington County.

== Early career ==
Johnson has been working as a business owner for over two decades, running two HVAC companies in Minnesota. began his political career at a local level. In 2016, he was elected to the Cottage Grove City Council, where he served for two years; he then ran for Washington County Commissioner and won the seat in 2018. He served 4 years in the commissioner role. Johnson has also served on multiple boards and commissions, including the Cottage Grove Planning Commission.

== Minnesota House of Representatives ==
After Republican incumbent Mark Wiens declared he was not seeking re-election to Minnesota House district 41A, two candidates emerged for the Republican primary: Wayne Johnson and Grayson McNew. McNew, backed by the Action 4 Liberty PAC, won endorsement at the Republican convention, but the more moderate Johnson defeated McNew in the Republican primary. In the general election, Johnson narrowly defeated DFL challenger Lucia Wroblewski, holding the seat by a margin of 1.09 points.

At the 2026 election, he was unseated by Democrat Cole Birkeland.

== Electoral history ==
2024 Minnesota House of Representatives Republican primary, District 41A
Party	Candidate	Votes	%
Republican	Wayne A Johnson	1,101	53.5
Republican	Grayson McNew	956	46.5
Total votes		2,057	100.0

2024 Minnesota House of Representatives election, District 41A
Party	Candidate	Votes	%
Republican	Wayne A Johnson	15,167	50.49
Democratic (DFL)	Lucia Wroblewski	14,840	49.40
Write-in		32	0.11
Total votes		30,039	100.00
Republican hold			

== Personal life ==
Johnson lives in Cottage Grove, Minnesota with his wife MaryBeth. He has two adult children.
