= Cole Birkeland =

American politician

Member-elect of the Minnesota House of Representatives from the 41A district
- Assuming office January 12, 2027
- Succeeding: Wayne Johnson

Personal details
- Party: Democratic
- Education: University of Minnesota Law School; University of Northwestern – St. Paul
- Website: www.colebirkeland.com

Cole Birkeland is an American politician who is the representative-elect for district 41A in the Minnesota House of Representatives. A member of the Minnesota Democratic–Farmer–Labor Party, he was elected in 2026, defeating incumbent Republican Wayne Johnson. Birkeland is a civil rights attorney.
