= Jeff Witte =

American politician (born 1965)

Member of the Minnesota House of Representatives from the 57B district
- Incumbent
- Assumed office January 3, 2023
- Preceded by: redistricted
- Succeeded by: Brian Cohn (elect)

Personal details
- Born: December 26, 1965 (age 60)
- Party: Republican
- Spouse: Jennifer
- Children: 3
- Education: Winona State University (BS); University of St. Thomas (Minnesota) (MA)
- Occupation: Retired law enforcement; Legislator
- Website: Government website Campaign website

Jeff Witte (born December 26, 1965) is an American politician serving in the Minnesota House of Representatives since 2023. A member of the Republican Party of Minnesota, Witte represents District 57B in the southern Twin Cities metropolitan area, which includes the city of Lakeville and parts of Dakota County.

== Early life, education and career ==
Witte grew up in a suburb of Chicago, Illinois. He received his bachelor's degree in social work and criminal justice from Winona State University, and a master's in police leadership, administration and education from the University of St. Thomas.

Witte served as an officer and sergeant in the Burnsville Police Department for 27 years. He served on the Lakeville Planning Commission from 2017 until his election to the legislature.

== Minnesota House of Representatives ==
Witte was elected to the Minnesota House of Representatives in 2022. He first ran for an open seat created by legislative redistricting.

Witte serves on the Public Safety Finance and Policy and the Taxes Committees.

== Electoral history ==
2022 Minnesota State House - District 57B
Party	Candidate	Votes	%
Republican	Jeff Witte	10,466	51.61
Democratic (DFL)	Erin Preese	9,790	48.28
Write-in		22	0.11
Total votes		22,278	100.0
Republican hold			

2024 Minnesota State House - District 57B
Party	Candidate	Votes	%
Republican	Jeff Witte (incumbent)	13,781	52.35
Democratic (DFL)	Brian Cohn	12,520	47.56
Write-in		24	0.09
Total votes		26,325	100.00
Republican hold			

== Personal life ==
Witte lives in Lakeville with his wife, Jennifer, and has three children.
