= Brian Cohn =

American politician

Member-elect of the Minnesota House of Representatives from the 57B district
- Assuming office January 12, 2027
- Succeeding: Jeff Witte

Personal details
- Born: Chicago, Illinois
- Party: Democratic
- Education: University of Minnesota; University of Rochester
- Website: briancohn4mn.com

Brian Cohn is an American politician who is the representative-elect for district 57B in the Minnesota House of Representatives. A member of the Minnesota Democratic–Farmer–Labor Party, he was elected in 2026, defeating the incumbent, Jeff Witte. Cohn also ran for the House in 2024. He is an engineer and product manager.

== Personal life ==
Cohn is Jewish.
