= Lucy Rehm =

American politician

Member of the Minnesota House of Representatives from the 48B district
- Incumbent
- Assumed office January 3, 2023
- Preceded by: Greg Boe

Personal details
- Party: Democratic (DFL)
- Spouse: Phil
- Children: 3
- Education: College of St. Benedict (BA); University of Minnesota, Twin Cities
- Occupation: Legislator
- Website: Government website Campaign website

Lucille "Lucy" Rehm is an American politician serving in the Minnesota House of Representatives since 2023. A member of the Minnesota Democratic-Farmer-Labor Party (DFL), Rehm represents District 48B in the western Twin Cities metropolitan area, which includes the cities of Chanhassen and Chaska and parts of Carver County.

== Early life, education and career ==
Rehm received her bachelor's degree in English from the College of St. Benedict, and attended the University of Minnesota, studying Japanese and ESL. She has also studied French at the College International De Cannes, and Japanese at the Sapporo Institute of Language.

Rehm served on the Chanhassen City Council and the Chanhassen Environmental Commission before her election to the legislature.

== Minnesota House of Representatives ==
Rehm was elected to the Minnesota House of Representatives in 2022. She defeated two-term Republican incumbent Greg Boe.

Rehm serves on the Agriculture Finance and Policy, Climate and Energy Finance and Policy, Education Finance, and Sustainable Infrastructure Policy Committees.

=== Policy positions ===
Rehm authored legislation included in the 2023 transportation budget that created an e-bike rebate program.

Rehm sponsored a bill that designated a seven-mile stretch of highway in Chanhassen the "Prince Rogers Nelson Memorial Highway", which passed the House with unanimous support on April 21, 2023, the anniversary of Prince's death. The highway runs past Paisley Park, Prince's home and recording studio. The bill was supported by members of Prince's family and covered the cost of four purple signs placed along the route.

== Electoral history ==
2022 Minnesota State House - District 48B
Party	Candidate	Votes	%
Democratic (DFL)	Lucy Rehm	10,632	50.97
Republican	Greg Boe (incumbent)	10,215	48.97
Write-in		13	0.06
Total votes		20,860	100.0
Democratic (DFL) hold			

2024 Minnesota State House - District 48B
Party	Candidate	Votes	%
Democratic (DFL)	Lucille "Lucy" Rehm (incumbent)	12,953	50.39
Republican	Caleb Steffenhagen	12,728	49.52
Write-in		22	0.09
Total votes		25,703	100.0
Democratic (DFL) hold			

== Personal life ==
Rehm lives in Chanhassen, Minnesota, with her spouse, Phil, and has three children.
