= Jeff Brand =

American politician

Member of the Minnesota House of Representatives
- In office January 3, 2023 – January 14, 2025
- Preceded by: Dean Urdahl
- Succeeded by: Erica Schwartz
- Constituency: District 18A
- In office January 8, 2019 – January 5, 2021
- Preceded by: Clark Johnson
- Succeeded by: Susan Akland
- Constituency: District 19A

Personal details
- Party: Democratic
- Spouse: Genevieve
- Children: 2
- Education: Vermilion Community College; Minnesota State University, Mankato (BS)
- Occupation: Small business owner; Legislator
- Website: Government website Campaign website

Jeff Brand is an American politician who served in the Minnesota House of Representatives from 2023 to 2025 and from 2019 to 2021. A member of the Minnesota Democratic–Farmer–Labor Party (DFL), Brand represented District 18A in south-central Minnesota, which includes the cities of St. Peter and North Mankato, Nicollet County, and parts of Blue Earth and Le Sueur Counties.

== Early life, education, and career ==
Brand was raised on a dairy farm in Howard Lake, Minnesota. He graduated from the Parks Law Enforcement Academy with a certificate, from Vermilion Community College, and from Minnesota State University, Mankato, with a Bachelor of Science in anthropology.

Brand served as a member of the St. Peter City Council from 2011 to 2018. He co-owns a rain garden installation and native plant landscaping company, Seed to Site, with his wife, Genevieve.

== Minnesota House of Representatives ==
Brand was elected to the Minnesota House of Representatives in 2018. He first ran after three-term DFL incumbent Clark Johnson announced he would not seek reelection. In 2020, Brand lost reelection to Republican Susan Akland. He ran against Akland again in 2022 and won. During the 2020 election, Brand was endorsed by the Minnesota Police and Peace Officers Association (MPPOA), who later pulled the endorsement after a protest outside Minneapolis Police Federation President Bob Kroll's home, which Brand did not attend.

Brand was the vice chair of the Workforce Development Finance and Policy Committee in the 2023-24 session and sat on the Environment and Natural Resources Finance and Policy, Taxes, and Transportation Finance and Policy Committees. From 2019 to 2020, Brand served as vice chair of the Agriculture and Food Finance and Policy Committee.

Brand has advocated for increased investments in local government and county program aid. He introduced legislation to give homeowners incentives to upgrade water softeners and reduce chloride in water. He supported legislation to boost funding for research on alternative crops such as kernza, and wrote a bill increasing funding for grain bin safety and farmer education.

Brand was the lead author of legislation that would eliminate non-essential PFAS chemicals from products for children, cookware, ski wax, carpet, cosmetics and more. The legislation was supported by environmental groups and opposed by chemical corporation lobbyists. He also authored legislation that would allow Minnesotans exposed to harmful chemicals to sue companies for the cost of monitoring their health.

== Electoral history ==
2018 Minnesota State House - District 19A
Party	Candidate	Votes	%
Democratic (DFL)	Jeff Brand	10,274	54.34
Republican	Kim Spears	8,603	45.50
Write-in		30	0.16
Total votes		18,907	100.0
Democratic (DFL) hold			

2020 Minnesota State House - District 19A
Party	Candidate	Votes	%
Republican	Susan Akland	11,624	50.15
Democratic (DFL)	Jeff Brand (incumbent)	11,516	49.68
Write-in		40	0.17
Total votes		23,180	100.0
Republican gain from Democratic (DFL)			

2022 Minnesota State House - District 18A
Party	Candidate	Votes	%
Democratic (DFL)	Jeff Brand	9,530	51.04
Republican	Susan Akland (incumbent)	9,119	48.84
Write-in		23	0.12
Total votes		18,672	100.0
Democratic (DFL) gain from Republican			

2024 Election for Minnesota House of Representatives District 18A
Party	Candidate	Votes	%
Republican	Erica Schwartz	12,282	51.60%
Democratic (DFL)	Jeff Brand	11,480	48.23%
Republican gain from Minnesota Democratic-Farmer-Labor party			

== Personal life ==
Brand and his wife, Genevieve, have two children. He resides in St. Peter, Minnesota.
