= Dave Lislegard =

American politician

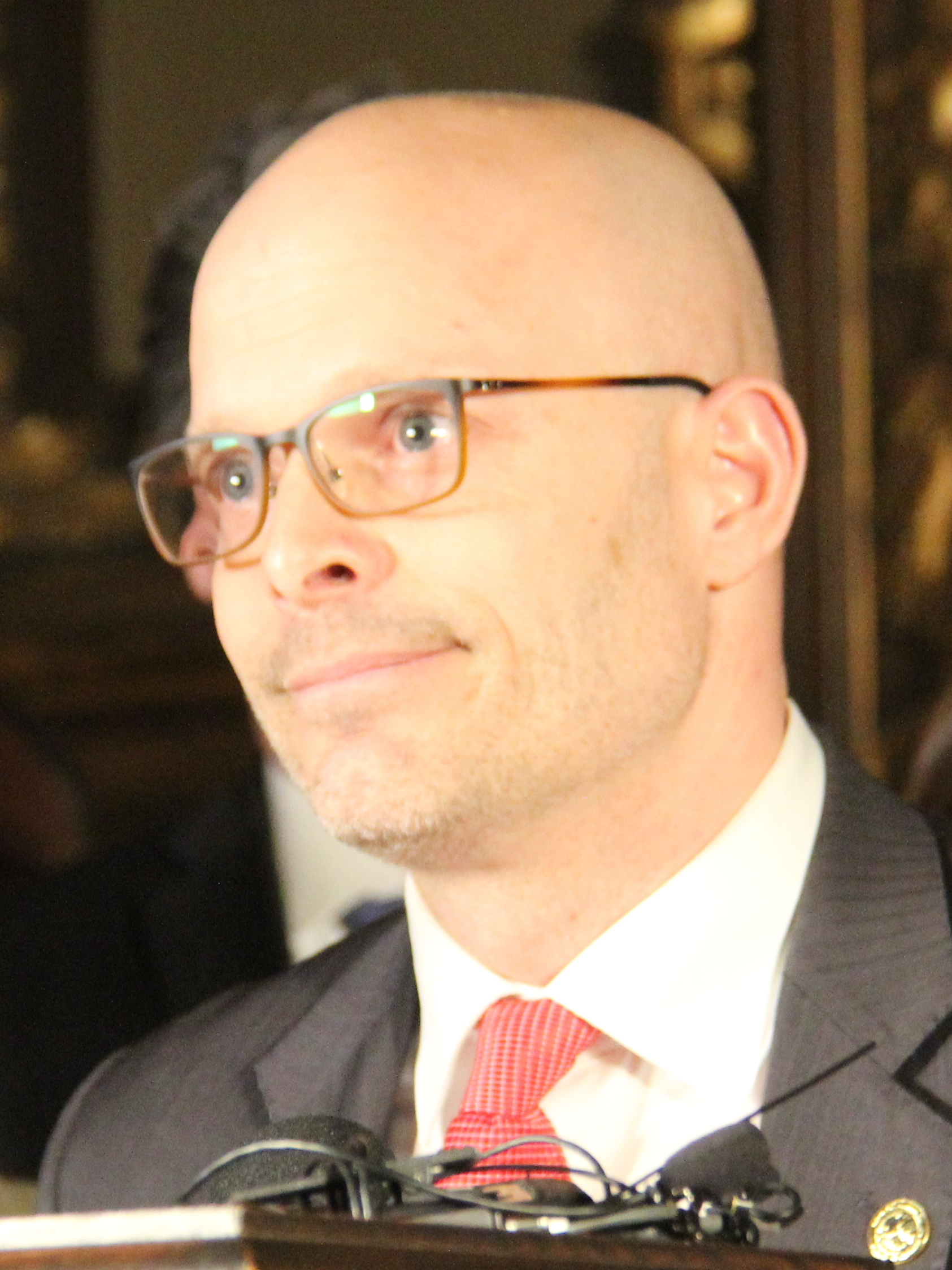

Member of the Minnesota House of Representatives
- In office January 8, 2019 – January 14, 2025
- Preceded by: Jason Metsa
- Succeeded by: Cal Warwas
- Constituency: District 6B (2019–2023); District 7B (2023–2025)

Personal details
- Born: March 6, 1973 (age 53)
- Party: Democratic
- Spouse: Lisa
- Children: 2
- Education: Mesabi Range College; University of Minnesota Duluth (BA)
- Occupation: Business relations; Legislator
- Website: Government website Campaign website

Dave Lislegard (/ˈlɪzləɡɑːrd/ LIZ-lə-gard; born March 6, 1973) is an American politician who served from 2019 to 2025 in the Minnesota House of Representatives. A member of the Democratic–Farmer–Labor Party (DFL), Lislegard represented District 7B in northeast Minnesota, which includes the city of Virginia and parts of St. Louis County in the Iron Range.

== Early life, education, and career ==
Lislegard attended Babbitt-Embarrass High School. He attended Mesabi Range College for two years and graduated from the University of Minnesota Duluth with a Bachelor of Arts in political science and communications.

Lislegard worked as a steelworker at the LTV steel plant in Hoyt Lakes, Minnesota, until he was laid off in 2001. He worked in business relations for Lakehead Constructors.

Lislegard served on the Aurora City Council for 14 years and as mayor from 2017 until he was elected to the state legislature. As a council member and mayor, Lislegard long supported the mining industry in the Iron Range, saying he was confident mining could be done responsibly despite environmental concerns. He opposed efforts to insert language into the DFL party platform that would "oppose sulfide-ore mining" in the state, and served as a member of the pro-mining Jobs for Minnesotans' board of directors.

== Minnesota House of Representatives ==
Lislegard was elected to the Minnesota House of Representatives in 2018 and was reelected every two years until 2024. He first ran after three-term DFL incumbent Jason Metsa announced he would not seek reelection and would run for Minnesota's 8th Congressional District. Lislegard defeated the party-endorsed candidate, Shaun Hainey, in the DFL primary.

Lislegard chaired the Property Tax Division from 2023 until 2024 and sat on the Taxes, Environment and Natural Resources, and Veterans and Military Affairs committees in his term. From 2019 to 2022 he served as vice chair of the Taxes Committee.

In May 2024, Lislegard announced he would not seek reelection to the Minnesota House after serving three terms. At the time of his retirement, he was the last DFL House member to represent Minnesota's Iron Range, once a DFL stronghold.

=== Mining and environmental regulations ===
Lislegard is a vocal supporter of the mining industry in the Iron Range, and was called "arguably the most pro-mining legislator" in the state. He co-authored legislation to officially declare Minnesota a "mining-friendly" state. He supported the PolyMet and Twin Metals mining proposals, and criticized Mesabi Metallics for failing to meet state deadlines for its taconite mining project.

Lislegard has argued mining can be done safely, boost the local economy, and create good-paying jobs and that opponents of mining would force the outsourcing of materials to countries with looser environmental standards. He has said that if the companies fail to show they can meet environmental standards, he would oppose their permits.

Lislegard authored legislation for a $10 million extension of unemployment benefits for 400 miners laid off from Cleveland-Cliffs Northshore Mining operations in May 2022. The bill passed the House with broad bipartisan support and was signed by Governor Tim Walz on January 24, 2023. He introduced a bill that would provide $25 million in state funds to renovate power lines in Northern Minnesota.

Lislegard supported a major expansion of a solar manufacturing plant in the Iron Range, saying the materials for the plant should be mined in Minnesota. He raised concerns over the reestablishment of the Minnesota Pollution Control Agency's citizen's board and the impact it would have on the mining industry. His and other rural DFL members' opposition led to the proposal being scaled back to only include the seven-county metro and other large cities.

=== Taxes ===
Lislegard supported fully eliminating the state tax on Social Security benefits, and authored legislation to repeal it. He later supported a full repeal for couples earning less than $100,000 annually. Lislegard supported the DFL's 2023 tax proposal, including raising taxes on the top 0.8 percent of earners and corporate income. He supported efforts to permanently increase local and county government aid.

Lislegard, who played an extra in the 2005 film "North Country" filmed in the Iron Range, has led efforts to give tax incentives and rebates to the entertainment industry to increase film and TV production in Minnesota. He co-authored legislation in 2022 to propose a gas tax holiday due to rising costs and inflation.

=== Other political positions ===
Lislegard has opposed "right to work" laws and called himself a "labor Democrat". He supported the Minnesota Police and Peace Officers Association's (MPPOA) priorities on pensions, labor agreements, local government aid, and frontline worker pay, and was one of a handful of DFL candidates it endorsed in 2022. He authored legislation that funded a public safety center in Virginia, Minnesota. He was endorsed by the NRA Political Victory Fund (NRA-PVF) in 2022.

Lislegard voted for the PRO Act, which established a fundamental right to an abortion in state law in accordance with a 1995 Minnesota State Supreme Court ruling. He authored legislation to build a facility in St. Louis County to treat PFAS chemicals. In November 2020, during the COVID-19 pandemic, he voted with House Republicans attempting to rescind Governor Walz's emergency powers.

== Electoral history ==
2018 Minnesota State House - District 6B
Party	Candidate	Votes	%
Democratic (DFL)	Dave Lislegard	12,075	61.97
Republican	Skeeter Tomczak	7,379	37.87
Write-in		30	0.15
Total votes		19,484	100.0
Democratic (DFL) hold			

2020 Minnesota State House - District 6B
Party	Candidate	Votes	%
Democratic (DFL)	Dave Lislegard (incumbent)	12,648	54.54
Republican	Julie Buria	10,513	45.33
Write-in		31	0.13
Total votes		23,192	100.0
Democratic (DFL) hold			

2022 Minnesota State House - District 7B
Party	Candidate	Votes	%
Democratic (DFL)	Dave Lislegard (incumbent)	10,178	51.10
Republican	Matt Norri	9,708	48.74
Write-in		32	0.16
Total votes		18,918	100.0
Democratic (DFL) hold			

== Personal life ==
Lislegard and his wife, Lisa, reside in Aurora, Minnesota. They have two children.
