= Chris Swanson =

American politician

Member-elect of the Minnesota House of Representatives from the 11A district
- Assuming office January 12, 2027
- Succeeding: Jeff Dotseth

Personal details
- Party: Democratic
- Website: chrisswansonforhouse.com

Chris Swanson is an American politician who is the representative-elect for district 11A in the Minnesota House of Representatives. A member of the Minnesota Democratic–Farmer–Labor Party, he was elected in 2026, unseating the incumbent, Republican Jeff Dotseth. He is a schoolteacher.
