= Mark Wiens (politician) =

American soldier and politician

Member of the Minnesota House of Representatives from the 41A district
- In office January 3, 2023 – January 14, 2025
- Preceded by: redistricted
- Succeeded by: Wayne Johnson

Personal details
- Born: January 6, 1963 (age 63)
- Party: Republican
- Spouse: Tina
- Children: 2
- Education: University of Minnesota (BA); United States Army Command and General Staff College School of Advanced Military Studies (MMAS)
- Occupation: Consultant; Legislator
- Website: Government website Campaign website

Military service
- Allegiance: United States
- Branch/service: United States Army; Minnesota Army National Guard
- Rank: Colonel

Mark Wiens (born January 6, 1963) is an American politician who served from 2023 to 2025 in the Minnesota House of Representatives. A member of the Republican Party of Minnesota, Wiens represented District 41A in the eastern Twin Cities metropolitan area, which includes the cities of Cottage Grove and Lake Elmo and parts of Washington County.

== Early life, education and career ==
Wiens received his bachelor's degree in history from the University of Minnesota. He attended the United States Army Command and General Staff College and the School of Advanced Military Studies earning a Master of Military Art and Science (MMAS) in theater operations.

Wiens served in the United States Army followed by the Minnesota National Guard retiring after 30 years of service, reaching the rank of Colonel.

== Minnesota House of Representatives ==
Wiens was elected to the Minnesota House of Representatives in 2022. He first ran for an open seat created by legislative redistricting.

Wiens served on the Judiciary Finance and Civil Law, Veterans and Military Affairs Finance and Policy, and Workforce Development Finance and Policy Committees.

In February 2024, Wiens announced he would not seek re-election in the Minnesota House, instead running for an open seat on the Washington County Board of Commissioners. He narrowly lost the race to Bethany Cox, receiving 48.8% of the vote.

=== Political positions ===
Wiens supported legislation directing the Minnesota Department of Natural Resources (DNR) to provide Lake Elmo with enough water to meet demand due to water use issues.

== Electoral history ==
2022 Minnesota State House - District 41A
Party	Candidate	Votes	%
Republican	Mark Wiens	11,801	50.24
Democratic (DFL)	Pat Driscoll	11,673	49.69
Write-in		17	0.07
Total votes		23,491	100.0
Republican hold			

== Personal life ==
Wiens lives in Lake Elmo, Minnesota, with his wife, Tina, and their two children.
