= Erica Schwartz (politician) =

American politician

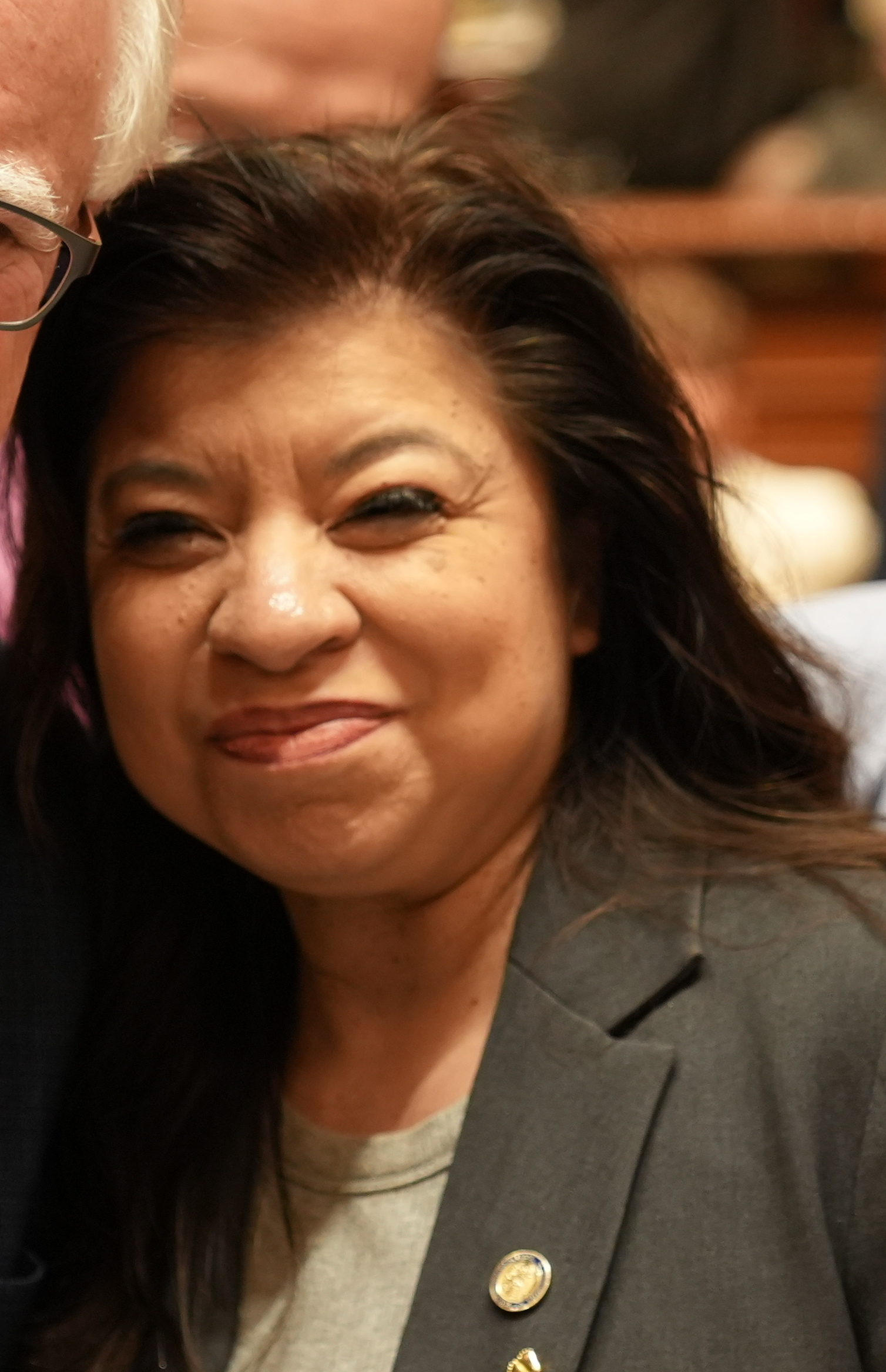

Member of the Minnesota House of Representatives from the 18A district
- Incumbent
- Assumed office January 14, 2025
- Preceded by: Jeff Brand
- Succeeded by: Leah Hanson (elect)

Personal details
- Born: June 28, 1978 (age 48)
- Party: Republican
- Spouse: Kevin
- Children: 3
- Education: South Central College (AA), Minnesota State University, Mankato
- Occupation: Business owner; Legislator

Erica Schwartz is an American politician serving since 2025 as a member of the Minnesota House of Representatives. A member of the Republican Party, Schwartz represents District 18A in south-central Minnesota, encompassing Nicollet County and parts of Blue Earth and Le Sueur Counties.

== Early life, education and career ==
Erica Schwartz is Mexican-American. She grew up in southern California. When she was 15, she moved to Gaylord, Minnesota. She went to Sibley East High School, and experienced some culture shock in her first year, but became more comfortable in rural southern Minnesota with time. She was diagnosed with a brain tumor during her senior year of high school. After high school, she moved to Nicollet, Minnesota.

When Schwartz was 25, her fiancé, Zack Smith, a recently returned Marine veteran, was killed in a car crash. She was pregnant at the time of his death and was a single mother until her marriage. She worked multiple jobs to support her child, including factory jobs at Taylor Corporation in North Mankato and Schmidt’s Meat Market in Nicollet.

She received an associate degree from South Central College in 2019.

== Minnesota House of Representatives ==
Schwartz ran in the 2024 Minnesota House of Representatives election, challenging incumbent Jeff Brand after winning the Republican primary unopposed. During the campaign, she was overheard at a fundraiser implying that Democrats were leading the country toward another Holocaust; she apologized for the comment. The district has a history of close elections and party changes, so the race drew significant funding for both candidates, including $1.25 million from outside organizations.

On November 5, 2025, Schwartz was the first announced Republican winner of the 134 House seats, flipping the seat by three percentage points. She was one of three Republicans to flip their seats from DFL control, ending the DFL trifecta of the previous legislature and tying the House. Her strongest margins were in Nicollet County’s rural townships and cities. In addition to winning in Kasota and her hometown of Nicollet, Schwartz pulled ahead of Brand with a significant boost from Mankato’s largest precinct in the district.

Schwartz is the vice chair of the Higher Education Finance and Policy Committee in the 94th Minnesota Legislature and sits on the Taxes Committee and the Public Safety Finance and Policy Committee.

As a chief author, Schwartz has introduced legislation to designate St. Peter as the honorary capital of Minnesota, enhance penalties for motor vehicle theft, require record of domestic violence-related offense release decisions, move the agriculture department's principal offices to Blue Earth or Nicollet County, establish a Department of Direct care and Treatment, and modify certain legal definitions related to restraining orders. She has also secured $1.9 million for upgrades to the water treatment plant in Lafayette, advocated for funding North Mankato's indoor recreational facility, supported financial assistance for children's museums in Greater Minnesota, provided funding for Mankato Regional Airport's air traffic control tower, established a low-interest student loan program, secured funding for a health professional education loan forgiveness program for physicians licensed to practice obstetrics and gynecology, secured funding for South Central College classroom and lab space improvements and boiler replacement, and modified St. Peter's local sales tax.

As an author, Schwartz advocated the investigation of allegations of fraud in state programs and undisclosed legislative conflicts of interest by establishing a Commission on Governmental Efficiency and Ethics, increasing child tax credit, eliminating child credit marriage penalty and increasing credit phaseout, prohibiting the construction of schools near former landfills, providing funds for anti-human trafficking training, and establishing minimum sentences for malicious punishment of a child.

On March 16, 2026, the Minnesota House of Representatives unanimously passed H.R. 2169, a public safety bill chief-authored by Schwartz that expanded the offense of unintentional second-degree murder to include cases involving violations of protective orders issued in additional jurisdictions. The legislation passed with bipartisan support by a vote of 134–0.

=== Political positions ===
Schwartz focused her campaign on local issues and economic concerns, avoiding national issues when possible. She said she ran for office after seeing Minnesotans' pain at the gas pump and grocery store while working at Nicollet Mart and vowed to fight for constituents' needs.

She supports lowering taxes on Social Security, saying, "while some politicians see it fit to build a $730 million palace for politicians, I promise to be a strong voice for permanent tax relief at the Capitol, including the complete elimination of the tax on your hard-earned Social Security benefit."

In addition to her plans to lower taxes, Schwartz iterated her support for loosening state regulations on local schools, small businesses, and farmers.

== Personal life ==
Schwartz and her husband, Kevin, live in Nicollet, Minnesota. They have three children from previous relationships. Kevin’s parents own and manage Nicollet mart, a gas station and food shop in Nicollet, MN.

== Electoral history ==
2024 Election for Minnesota House of Representatives District 18A
Party	Candidate	Votes	%
Republican	Erica Schwartz	12,282	51.60%
Democratic (DFL)	Jeff Brand	11,480	48.23%
Republican gain from Minnesota Democratic-Farmer-Labor party			
