= Twin Metals mine =

Proposed copper mine

The Twin Metals mine is a potential copper sulfide mine near Ely, Minnesota, on Superior National Forest land. There has been significant opposition to the proposed mine, most notably because of its proximity to the Boundary Waters Canoe Area Wilderness, location within a watershed that drains into the BWCA, and the air, water, light and noise pollution and traffic effects of converting a forested area bordering the BWCA into a substantial industrial mining facility. The Twin Metals mine is being attempted by Twin Metals LLC, a subsidiary of Antofagasta Minerals, itself a subsidiary of the Chilean conglomerate Antofagasta PLC, which is controlled by billionaire Jean-Paul Luksic Fontbona. The original lease is a 1966 lease to the International Nickel Corporation.

The facility would have an underground mining area accessed by two sloping tunnels, an above-ground processing factory, and a tailings dumping area that would use the dry-storage method. Twin Metals has estimated that the mine would provide 700 jobs and create 1,400 jobs in related industries and that it would operate for 25 years, mining 20,000 tons of ore per day retrieved from depths of between 400 and 4,500 feet.

The mine's leases were terminated under the Obama administration but renewed under the first Trump administration. Critics have objected to and filed lawsuits against various aspects of the lease renewal and regulatory processes.

In March 2021, President Joe Biden announced that the Interior and Agriculture departments would review Twin Metals' lease renewal and a judge ordered a pause in the lawsuit(s) until June 21, 2021, to review the Trump administration's decision to renew the leases. On October 20, 2021, the Biden administration ordered a study that could lead to a 20-year ban on mining upstream from the Boundary Waters Canoe Area Wilderness. The federal government said it had filed an application for a "mineral withdrawal", which would begin with a thorough study of the likely environmental and other impacts of mining if it were permitted in a watershed that flows into the Boundary Waters. On January 26, 2022, the U.S. Department of the Interior canceled two leases required to build and operate the mine, determining that they were improperly renewed under the previous administration. On January 26, 2023, The Department of the Interior set a 20-year moratorium on mining in 225,000 acres of the forest upstream of the BWCA. The moratorium protects the waters of the Rainy River watershed from pollution and blocks the proposed Twin Metals mine.

Iron mining has been a significant part of Ely's history, and iron mines in the Mesabi Range still account for a majority of US iron ore production. Ely now also has significant recreational business related to the BWCAW and Superior National Forest. Proponents cite the economic benefits from projected jobs from the mine; opponents assert that those might not be as expected and would last only for 25 years, and that the mine could prove to be a net economic loss for the region because of its effects on other aspects of its economy.

== Proposed mine ==
Superior National Forest was created in 1909. The Boundary Waters Canoe Area Wilderness, which is within it, is highly protected as wilderness and was created in stages, primarily between the 1930s and 1978. In the 1960s, during the Lyndon Johnson administration, the International Nickel Company negotiated with federal officials to begin copper-nickel mining near Ely in St. Louis County, Minnesota. The proposed mine would be on land that is part of the Superior National Forest, in Minnesota's Arrowhead Region, between the Canada–U.S. border and Lake Superior's north shore. It is part of the greater Boundary Waters region along the Minnesota–Ontario border, a historic and important thoroughfare in the fur trading and exploring days of New France and British North America. The BWCA is popular for canoeing, fishing, and hiking, and is the country's most visited wilderness area. The proposed mine site is just outside the BWCA, within the Rainy River watershed, which drains into BWCA lakes, leading some to object that a mining accident could lead to contamination of the lakes within the Wilderness Area.

The proposed development is by Twin Metals Minnesota LLC, a Delaware corporation and subsidiary of Antofagasta. Twin Metals Minnesota LLC was formed in 2010 as a joint venture controlled by Antofagasta, a Chilean conglomerate controlled by billionaire Andrónico Luksic. Twin Metals' "operational headquarters" is in Ely and its corporate headquarters is in Saint Paul. Although the proposed mine is on Superior National Forest land, the mining is regulated by the Bureau of Land Management.

In December 2019, Twin Metals submitted its formal plans to state and federal officials. The documents lay out a detailed plan of the mining operation and an outline of how the company proposes to manage environmental impact. A Minnesota Public Radio report describes the operation as presented in the Twin Metals documents:

The mine would be accessed by two tunnels, 20 feet by 20 feet and 1.25 miles long, sloping downward to the ore body. Conveyor belts would carry crushed ore to the surface, where it would be processed into metal concentrates at a nearby processing plant. There would be lighting, ventilation, office space and places for employees to gather deep underground. [...] Most mining would occur from 400 feet down to a depth of potentially about 4,500 feet.

The company plans to use a system called "dry stacking" to dispose of tailings, which it says will avoid the use of water and any need for a wastewater treatment plant. Twin Metals says it can create and operate the mine safely and has submitted a plan of operations in its plan's main body, appendices, and worksheet data.

Minnesota has a long history of iron mines, but this would be one of its first copper mines. Another proposal remains under review: an open-pit mine near Babbitt proposed by PolyMet. It would be on the site of a closed iron mining operation, with plans to renovate and expand an old taconite facility to mine copper. Glencore, a British multinational commodity trading and mining company, is the majority stock owner of the PolyMet mining project.

=== Environmental concerns ===
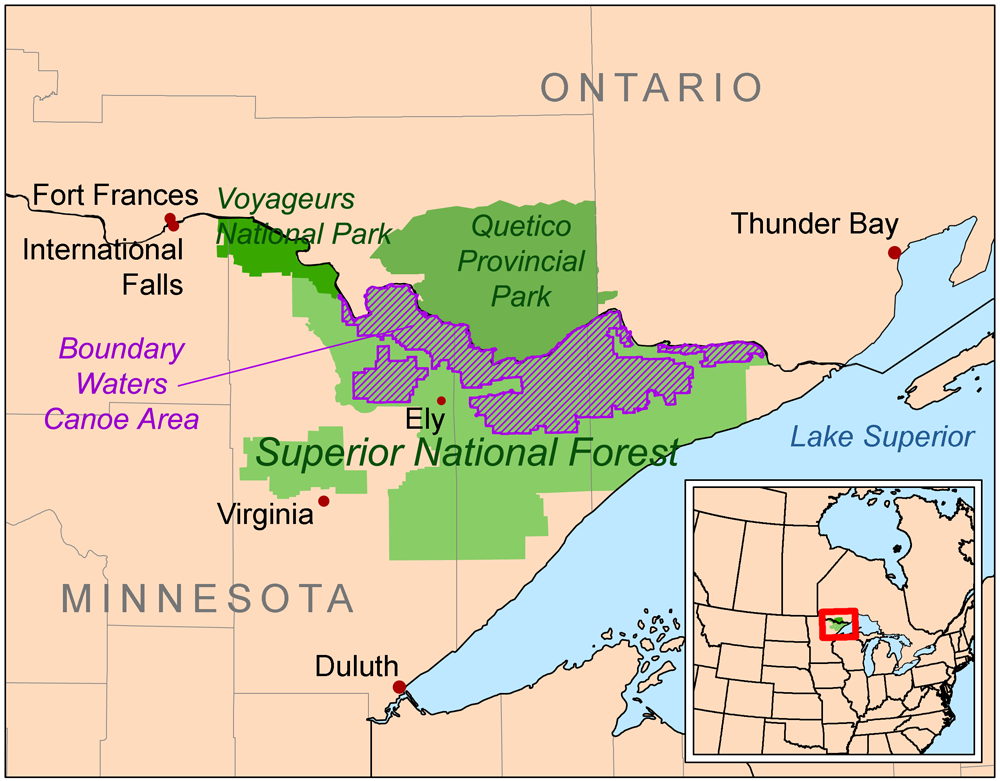
The BWCAW showing Ely within the Superior National Forest

The proposed mine and processing facility is controversial because it is to be on the shores of Birch Lake and the South Kawishiwi River, which lie in the Rainy River watershed and flow into the Boundary Waters Canoe Area Wilderness, about five miles northeast. In 2016 the Forest Service and Bureau of Land Management refused to extend two federal mineral leases to the Twin Metals mine plan, and the Forest Service proposed a 20-year mineral withdrawal and launched a 24-month environmental review of the proposal. The Trump administration reversed that decision and ended the environmental review, allowing the plans for the mine to proceed.

Tom Landwehr, who served five terms as the executive director of the Department of Natural Resources, does not oppose copper mining in Minnesota; in 2018 he worked to approve a proposed open-pit copper-nickel mine near Babbitt. But he believes that there are places where "we can't even consider mining", and when he looked at the plans for a mine so close to the Boundary Waters he said he was "just absolutely stunned". Landwehr noted that the Babbitt mine is in an existing mining area while the Ely site is not only within the BWCA watershed but is covered by forests, lakes and rivers. "It is just such a fragile site from the potential for human damages right on the edge of the Boundary Waters. They are two completely different sites, and this is one of those places where you have to say, 'Not this mine, not this site, not now, not ever.'"

Surface water pollution is the most often cited pollution concern. Others include light, noise, dust, air and groundwater pollution. Concern is about both the direct effects of these and the effect on property values and tourism and recreational industries due to the pristine environment of both the BWCA and the National Forest. Some studies found that pollution could be significant enough to make the mine a net economic loss for the area. Another concern is acidic drainage into groundwater from accumulated water in the mine.

=== Controversy over toxic waste storage ===
Historically, mining waste has been stored in tailings ponds, resulting in the release of toxic waste into nearby waters. In July 2019, saying "we heeded the evidence that is out there and we listened to the community concerns", Twin Metals put out a press release saying it would abandon the plan to use a storage pond, which was to be outside the BWCA watershed near Babbitt, and would instead use the dry stacking method of toxic waste storage. While generally more expensive than a conventional tailings dam, dry storage would not require the expensive construction and operation of a pipeline to ship tailings out of the BWCA watershed. Twin Metals’ chief regulatory officer Julie Padilla said, "The key is, it removes that tailings dam. It removes any potential for failure of a dam and spillage in that sense, which is obviously one of the big concerns about this project and others."

The state Department of Natural Resources has questioned whether the method can work in Minnesota's climate. MinnPost wrote that documents show that, when the DNR approved dam safety permits for the tailings pond to be used in the Babbitt PolyMet mine, it noted, "If dry stack material becomes wet—but isn't fully submerged in a tailings pond—it can leach heavy metals that can wash into nearby soil and water." The agency also said dry stack tailings can create a toxic dust that poses environmental risks. Padilla said that Twin Metals can deal with cold and wet weather by using the dry stack method only when weather allows and putting the tailings back into the underground mine, as has already been planned for about 50% of the tailings, during bad weather.

A spokesman for the Minnesota Center for Environmental Advocacy said that dry stacking is generally better than a tailings basin and dam but the department needed to see more specifics on the plan. Save the Boundary Waters called the decision to store waste at the project site "going from bad to worse". Of the four mines that Twin Metals has cited as successfully using the dry staking system, it said, "All are still in operation. This is important because it sometimes takes a decade or two after mining has ended for the full scale of water pollution to become evident. Nonetheless, all mines have polluted and may continue to pollute surrounding surface water, groundwater, or both."

== Obama administration ==
Twin Metals obtained the leases and applied for reauthorization in 2013. In 2014, the leases expired and were up for renewal. On March 8, 2016, the U.S. Department of the Interior Solicitor determined and advised the Bureau of Land Management (BLM) that there was no obligation to renew the leases. In June 2016, the U.S. Forest Service announced that it was considering withholding its consent for the leases' renewal. The announcement shocked many Iron Rangers; the first leases had been granted 50 years earlier and been renewed twice since. On July 14, the Forest Service held a "listening session" in Duluth to discuss Twin Metals's proposal. Nearly 500 people attended. A Regional Forester told those in attendance that the Forest Service was concerned about building a mine in the BWCA watershed: "We're concerned about water quality. And we're concerned about ... the ability within a wilderness area to be able to do adequate mitigation [should anything happen with a mine]." St. Louis County Commissioner Tom Rukavina said it seemed that the Forest Service had already made up its mind: "When you put out a press release that says you're deeply concerned about sulfide mining, you bias your own opinion." Lifelong Ely resident Becky Rom, who works with the organization Save the Boundary Waters, said, "This is the time for us to consider whether the watershed of the Boundary Waters is the right location for an industrial mining district. That decision must occur at the time leases are issued, because these issues grant the right to build a mine and extract minerals." National Public Radio reported that Daryl Spencer of Duluth summed up the views of the majority of speakers at the event when he told the Forest Service that he did not oppose mining but could not support building a mine in the BWCA watershed, and that while he wants jobs for Iron Rangers, "This is just a bad place for this type of mine, and it's not worth the risk."

On July 20, 2016, the last day for public comment on whether the mining leases should be renewed, the Forest Service held a meeting in Ely. Nearly 900 people attended. Speakers split about 50-50, with a narrow majority against the mine proposal. The meeting showed the deep divide between those who grew up in Ely with a long history as mine workers and those who settled in Ely because of the wilderness or connections to businesses that serve the BWCA-related tourist trade. Mike Syresvud, president of Iron Range Building Trades, supported the proposal and urged the Forest Service to allow the leases and evaluate the environmental impact once Twin Metals had submitted a mine plan. But opponents said this was the appropriate time for the government to decide whether copper-nickel mining should be allowed. Campaign to Save the Boundary Waters spokesperson Jeremy Drucker said, "If you look at the leases themselves, they explicitly grant the right to mine, and the right to build mining facilities, and so I think the question is 'Is this the right location to build a mine?' We don't think it is."

Citing the environmental risks that a sulfide-based copper-nickel mine posed to BWCA water quality, in December 2016 the Obama administration decided not to renew the leases. Copper-nickel mining can create acidic runoff known as acid mine drainage that can leach heavy metals into water. Thomas Tidwell, Forest Service Chief at the time, wrote that acid mine drainage could cause “serious and irreparable harm” to the BWCA by allowing drainage into Birch Lake and the Kawishiwi River. According to Tidwell, "acid drainage can be created in all phases of mining, from construction to storing waste rock and tailings." Since the federal leases were integral to its success, the decision all but ended the Twin Metals project.

== First Trump administration ==
=== Lease renewal ===
In May 2018, in an unprecedented action, the Interior Department ordered the Twin Metals leases to be reinstated. The administration claimed that the Obama administration had committed a "legal error" by determining that the government had discretion over whether to renew the leases. It based its argument on a 2017 opinion by Daniel Jorjani, a former legal counsel for the Charles Koch Foundation now working for the Interior Department. Jorjani argued that the original lease's terms guaranteed Twin Metals one more 10-year renewal. On May 15, 2019, the Trump administration renewed the leases.

In June 2018, nine businesses and various non-governmental organizations filed suit against the decision. The case is currently before a federal judge appointed by Trump. The St. Louis County Timberjay has obtained documents the government released to the plaintiffs as part of discovery, most of which are memoranda Minnesota officials wrote to the Interior Department in 1965 and 1966, when INCO still owned the leases. The memoranda show that by summer 1966 the lease had been finalized and the Interior Department had issued a press release announcing them. The press release says that the leases "grant mining rights to the company for 20 years, renewable for 30 years at 10-year intervals if the property is brought into production within the initial 20-year term." The Timberjay reported:

The discussions and agreements described in the memoranda suggest that the Trump administration may have a difficult time defending the validity of the legal opinion under which Interior officials made their decision. Nearly 53 years later, no copper-nickel has been produced from the leases, although the BLM and U.S. Forest Service did allow INCO and its successors to renew the leases in 1989 and 2004 despite the lack of production.

Related legal opinions by Reagan's and Obama's Interior Departments "concluded that renewal of the leases was discretionary on the part of the government, due in part to the company's failure to begin production within the initial 20-year term." The Timberjay concluded:

Nothing in any of the memoranda produced by the government supports Jorjani's novel claim. Instead, Jorjani's argument runs directly counter to the discussions detailed in government memoranda as well as the 1966 government press release which clearly linked the company's rights to future lease renewals to the beginning of production within the initial 20-year term.

The Forest Service initially said that the USDA would study the proposal for two years and then the Secretary of the Interior would make a decision based on its findings. But on September 6, 2018, the Forest Service canceled the deeper mineral withdrawal study the Obama administration had ordered. Agriculture Secretary Sonny Perdue said the 15 months of review that had already been completed revealed no new scientific information. He added, "[The USDA can both] protect the integrity of the watershed and contribute to economic growth and stronger communities." Executive Director of the Campaign to Save the Boundary Waters Alex Falconer said, "The Trump administration broke its word to us, to Congress, and to the American people when it said it would finish the environmental assessment and base decisions on facts and science." In November 2018, U.S. House members requested information on the withdrawal study's cancellation.

On December 21, 2018, the BLM announced a ten-year extension of the leases' renewal for $1 per acre per year plus royalties. Twin Metals issued a 34-page environmental assessment of its proposal and the public was given until January 22 to comment on it. A Center For American Progress review of the environmental assessment said:

In December 2018, the BLM released a separate 34-page EA recommending that Twin Metals’ mineral leases be renewed. However, the lack of proper scientific assessment in the EA was clear. Analysis of all potential environmental effects—including those on water resources, cultural resources, recreation, wildlife, vegetation, and soil—were described in just seven pages. Equally concerning, the entire EA included just 10 references, and only a single study on potential acid mine drainage was cited. Moreover, that study was authored by Golder Associates Inc., a company hired by Twin Metals in 2014 to write a technical report on the proposed mining project.

The day after the release of Twin Metals' assessment, a partial government shutdown began, resulting in the shutdown of many government agencies. Several environmental groups that opposed Twin Metals' proposals asked for an extension until March 25 because they had been unable to assess information they needed to conduct a review. They also asked for public hearings to be held in Duluth, Minneapolis-St. Paul and Washington, D.C. In a letter to the BLM, the groups wrote, "A rushed process is insufficient to understand the impacts of lease renewal on one of our nation's most cherished public lands", and they urged the government to "proceed cautiously and take adequate time to fully engage the public, the Forest Service, the scientific community, Native American tribes and others who will be impacted by the decision." Minnesota's U.S. senators Amy Klobuchar and Tina Smith and U.S. representatives Betty McCollum, Ilhan Omar, and Dean Phillips also asked the BLM to prepare an Environmental Impact Statement about the mine's effects on the Boundary Waters' "sensitive ecosystem" and to agree to a 60-day extension. In April 2019 the House deadline passed for supply of documents related to the withdrawal study.

On November 22, 2019, Minnesota regulators announced that they would conduct their own review of the proposed mine. In December 2019, the judge heard oral arguments in the lease challenge lawsuit and Twin Metals submitted formal plans for the mine.

=== Environmental review and permitting process ===
With its formal plan submitted state and federal officials in December 2019, Twin Metals announced it had received the Bureau of Land Management's Notice of Intent to scope and prepare an Environmental Impact Statement (EIS) for the proposed mine. The BLM notice initiates the scoping and environmental review process under the National Environmental Policy Act. Multiple federal agencies and tribal governments will take part in the process, and the public will have several opportunities to comment. The BLM, the Forest Service, the Department of Agriculture, the Army Corps of Engineers, the Environmental Protection Agency and the Department of Natural Resources will prepare a detailed EIS to thoroughly analyze the proposal's environmental impact. Regional Native American tribes, including the Bois Forte Band of Chippewa, the Fond du Lac Band of Lake Superior Chippewa, and the Grand Portage Band of Chippewa will also take part in the review. The results of the review will be compiled into the EIS, which can be expected to be thousands of pages long and take several years to complete.

In November 2019, the Minnesota Department of Natural Resources (DNR) announced it would conduct its own environmental review rather than collaborate with the federal government on a review. Upon completion of the independent reviews, the state will evaluate them both, but it will rely most heavily on the state review. Noting new regulations Trump has issued that have weakened the requirements for granting environmental approval status, the DNR concluded, "To ensure that transparent and predictable and credible state process, Minnesotans will be better served by doing our own independent process." DNR deputy commissioner Barb Naramore said, "[The] environmental review is really that process where we identify and evaluate and disclose to the public the potential environmental effects of a proposed project. We look not just at the project as proposed but at potential alternatives and the mitigations to those potential environmental impacts." The regulators will also analyze other impacts, such as effects on the regional economy, cultural resources and endangered species. Naramore will help lead the review. During a scoping period the regulators will determine exactly which topics will be studied. The public can weigh in at scheduled public meetings. Former regulator Peder Larson said that the review period is a time to learn and study before a final decision is made. "There is the time to learn, and there's the time to study. And that takes place before there's a time to decide." At the completion of the independent reviews the state will evaluate them both but ultimately they will rely most heavily on the one done by the state.

Throughout the review process state and federal agencies, along with Twin Metals, will work closely together. Naramore has said, "There's a lot of really important back-and-forth that takes place throughout the environmental review process, around potential refinements to the project, and to the mitigation approaches." When the review is completed, Minnesota state regulators will decide whether to grant a permit using the EIS. MPR News wrote, "But they're not deciding on the merits of the project. It's not up to regulators to determine whether the benefits of the Twin Metals mine—the jobs and economic impact and importance of the metals—outweigh the risks, like the potential for severe water pollution or whether a spot just outside the Boundary Waters is the right place for that kind of mine." David Zoll, a Minneapolis-based environmental attorney, said, "When you get to the ultimate decision on whether you issue a permit it's largely based on numbers. That is, the decision to issue a permit is based on things like the amount of specific pollutants a mine will discharge, and whether that level is allowable under the law. It's about meeting state standards, following state guidelines, but not about making a value judgment about the mine." In November 2020, the Minnesota DNR and Ely-based Northeastern Minnesotans for Wilderness reached an agreement under which the DNR will consider possible changes to non-ferrous mining rules that could include a prohibition on non-ferrous mining in the Rainy River watershed (which includes the proposed mine).

== Biden administration ==
On January 20, 2021, his first day in office, President Joe Biden directed federal agencies to review all actions taken during the Trump administration that might conflict with his administration's goal "to listen to the science, to improve public health and protect our environment and to ensure access to clean air and water." In March 2021, the Biden administration announced that the Interior and Agriculture departments would review Twin Metals' lease renewal and a federal judge approved a Justice Department request to pause a lawsuit filed in 2020 by Northeastern Minnesotans for Wilderness and a coalition of canoe outfitters and environmental groups that argued federal agencies had failed to conduct a thorough environmental review ahead of the renewal leases given to Twin Metals. The judge ordered a pause until June 21 to allow the Department of Interior and Department of Agriculture to review the Trump administration's decision to renew the leases.

On October 20, 2021, the Biden administration ordered a study that could lead to a 20-year ban on mining upstream from the BWCA. The federal government said it has filed an application for a "mineral withdrawal", which would begin with a thorough study of the likely environmental and other impacts of mining if it were permitted in a watershed that flows into the Boundary Waters.

On January 26, 2022, the U.S. Department of the Interior canceled two leases needed for the mine, saying that they were previously improperly renewed. This dealt a potentially fatal blow to the effort to build and operate the mine. Principal deputy solicitor Ann Marie Bledsoe Downes wrote that the department "issued Twin Metals' 2019 lease renewals in violation of multiple legal authorities." She also said that Interior did not properly recognize the U.S. Forest Service's consent authority during the process and did not analyze all possible scenarios in their environmental analysis, as required. The leases' cancellation was not considered a surprise, in part because previous administrations of both parties had determined that the leaseholders had no automatic right to renewal. Several past administrations, including those of Presidents Reagan and George W. Bush, determined that INCO's successors (e.g., Twin Metals) had no absolute right to renewal in legal opinions issued by attorneys with the Department of Interior.

On January 26, 2023, the Biden administration set a 20-year moratorium on mining in 225,000 acres of the forest that are upstream of the Boundary Waters Canoe Area Wilderness. The moratorium protects the waters of the Rainy River watershed from pollution and effectively blocks the mine.

== Second Trump administration ==
In 2026 the United States Senate voted 50–49 to repeal a ban on mining in the Superior National Forest.

== Political and legal actions ==
In 2018, Representative Betty McCollum filed an objection with the Secretary of the Interior and the Secretary of Agriculture to the mine and the process, detailing risks, impacts and criticism of process issues.

In December 2019, Landwehr and a group of environmentalists asked Minnesota Governor Tim Walz to stop the Twin Metals mine, saying, "Minnesota shouldn't even be considering a project that the Obama administration scuttled in 2016 as an unacceptable risk to the country's most popular wilderness." A spokesperson for Walz responded, "The governor believes that no mining project should move forward unless it passes a strict environmental review process that includes meaningful opportunities for public comment." Landwehr also asked that state regulators find the Twin Metals application incomplete because it will not include the findings of the cancelled U.S. Forest Service study under the Obama administration that the Trump administration never released despite numerous requests from members of Congress and others. Landwehr has concluded that the review found that the Twin Metals project should not be allowed to proceed: "They wouldn't be withheld if they said the project should be approved."

In February 2020, McCollum introduced a bill that would ban new copper-nickel mining in about 365 square miles of the Superior National Forest within the BWCA watershed (H.R. 5598). She said she believes the BWCA is designated as a federal wilderness that belongs to everyone, not just people who live nearby. She called the proposed type of mining new and untested and said she believed it is not worth what she sees as short-term economic gains. The Minnesota Ojibwe strongly support McCollum's bill. In a letter to Congress, the tribe wrote, "It is unacceptable to trade this precious landscape and our way of life to enrich foreign mining companies that will leave a legacy of degradation that will last forever."

=== Legal actions ===
After the reinstatement of Twin Metals' lease, in June 2018 three lawsuits were filed against the Interior Department. First, Northeastern Minnesotans for Wilderness (the founder and leader of the national coalition The Campaign to Save the Boundary Waters) and nine Minnesota businesses, mostly canoe outfitters, contended that the proposed mine would hurt their business by polluting the Boundary Waters. A second lawsuit was filed by The Wilderness Society, the Center for Biological Diversity, and the Izaak Walton League. A third was filed by the Friends of the Boundary Waters Wilderness. The three suits contend that the proposed mine poses risks to the Boundary Waters and that the department did not have the authority to reinstate Twin Metals' leases.

In May 2020, Northeastern Minnesotans for Wilderness, The Wilderness Society, The Center for Biological Diversity, the Izaak Walton League, the Friends of the Boundary Waters, and nine businesses filed a lawsuit in federal court in Washington, D.C. The suit alleges the Bureau of Land Management conducted only a limited review rather than an in-depth environmental impact statement as required by law. In August 2020, they filed an amended complaint alleging that there was improper interference to remove the stipulation that lease renewals be subject to Forest Service approval.

In June 2020, Northeastern Minnesotans for Wilderness filed a lawsuit requesting that the Minnesota DNR ban copper mining in the Boundary Waters watershed. NMW contends that the nonferrous mining rules fail to protect the Boundary Waters as required by the Minnesota Environmental Rights Act. NMW wants a judge to order the DNR to review the rules and make changes, including a ban, "to prevent a uniquely toxic and accident-prone form of mining from occurring in the Rainy River-Headwaters, waters that flow into and are in the same watershed as the BWCAW, and threaten the water and land of these unique and vital natural resources."

== Opinions and concerns ==
With the beginning of the closing of the Minnesota Iron Range mines in the 1960s, northern Minnesota fell into a decline from which it has never recovered. One worker laid off in 1981 said, "We lost our future, we lost our enthusiasm for living. We lost that vibrant group of young people that participated in the economy, [and] we’ve never really recovered, not in population and not in economy." As the principal gateway to the Boundary Waters Canoe Area Wilderness, summers see an influx of tourists that supports numerous outdoor equipment outlets, canoe outfitters, and other establishments, but most of the tourist trade dries up in the winter.

Hoping to return to economic prosperity, many Ely residents support the proposed mine and support Trump's reelection because he supports the proposal. Ely mayor Chuck Novak supports the mine and has said, "The hope rested with Trump; that's where the people went ... it's hope. People want hope for a better future. This is the old method of politics: you take care of your economy and your people." Ely resident Sue Schurke, who has established a small manufacturing business designing and marketing winter jackets, disagrees with those who say the tourism economy cannot sustain Ely, but has said, "The work ethic in this town is pretty amazing. And these are good people. So, you know, the issue is delicate, because I do have a lot of respect for the people in this community whose families are miners."

=== Local approval ===
Local residents are deeply divided over the mine. Some see it as economic salvation and believe it can operate safely and provide hundreds of well-paying jobs. When the Minnesota Chippewa objected to the mine because it could pollute the Boundary Waters, Novak called on residents to stop hosting events at a nearby Native American casino, and the city council unanimously defended his action. One Ely resident said, "I do not want the city council kowtowing to these environmental bullies."

Many Ely residents still harbor anger over losing "their lake" when the area became protected from development by the 1964 Wilderness Act, followed by a federal law that officially designated it the Boundary Waters Canoe Area Wilderness in 1978. At that time the lakes were lined with hundreds of cottages and locally owned resorts. Power boats brought residents to distant lakes with ease. Longtime Ely resident Bill Erzar has said that Ely residents feel they did not receive fair compensation from the government: "It was devastating to this community. Lots of my friends’ families lost everything fighting the government to keep their property." Only one home and business were allowed to remain, that of Dorothy Molter, the "Root Beer Lady".

Former Ely Mayor Roger Skraba still resents the establishment of the BWCA and has said, "Is there a bad taste in my mouth? Absolutely. Will it go away? When I'm dead." He sees those opposing the mine as liberal environmentalists trying to impose their values on others. Skraba has said he met with Jean Paul Luksic, the Chilean billionaire whose family owns Antofagasta, and that Luksic made a good impression on him, leading him to believe the company will respect the Boundary Waters.

Former Twin Metals special projects manager David Oliver moved to Ely in 2007 to work on the project. Twin Metals claims its site contains 99% of U.S. nickel reserves, 88% of its cobalt reserves, and a third of the nation's copper reserves. Oliver has said, "these materials are used by everyone, including critics of the mine, and are going to have to come from somewhere." Oliver, who was the chairman of the Ely area Republican caucus, has said of liberals, "They hate the country. They hate the flag. They hate the military. They hate God. They hate anything that has to do with resource extraction."

=== Local opposition ===
Environmentalists oppose the proposal. Longtime Ely resident Paul Schurke, who along with Will Steger made the first unsupported dogsled trip to the North Pole, has said that local mine supporters are being “hoodwinked...if they score the permits, they'll sit on them until the market improves and until expensive mining manpower has been replaced by robotics.”

Ely resident Becky Rom has been leading wilderness trips and speaking out for the preservation of the Boundary Waters since she was a girl. She adamantly opposes the mining proposal, making her "the most reviled person in the room" when she attended a recent city council meeting. Rom and Landwehr believe that environmental reviews are inadequate to maintain the BWCA's integrity because existing regulations do not address the specific risks of Twin Metals' proposal and permit some degradation.

Ely resident Kris Hallberg, a retired World Bank economist, says there is a national trend of recreation replacing mining in driving economic growth and that Ely has hundreds of operating businesses, a renowned wolf center, art galleries, a museum, and a range of festivals held every year. Speaking to a small group of Ely residents, she reported the results of a Harvard University economics professor's analysis of Ely's projected future with and without the mine: "Twin Metals estimates it will bring at least 700 direct jobs and 1,400 spin-off ones, and the analysis found this would undeniably benefit the region. But the gains would be short-lived once the mine shut down after its projected 25-year lifespan and would undercut the outdoors-based economy that, along with tourists, has drawn entrepreneurs and professionals to live and work near the Boundary Waters."

=== State and national opinions ===
In February 2020 a Star Tribune/MPR News poll found that 60% of Minnesotans oppose new mining near the BWCA and 22% support it. When asked whether providing jobs or protecting the environment was more important when it comes to mining, 66% said the environment was a higher priority and 19% said jobs were. The poll found slightly different results in northern Minnesota. There, 60% said the environment was more important, while 23% said jobs were. The poll did not name the mine specifically.

The Center for American Progress has listed numerous concerns about Twin Metals' plans:

- The conglomerate that Twin Metals is a subsidiary of has been involved in a number of corruption, bribery, and other scandals in its home country.
- "The Boundary Waters case is emblematic of the Trump administration's modus operandi: bypass the regulatory process by shortcutting scientific assessment, ignoring local opposition, and bending the law.
- A 2012 study found that every copper mining operation had experienced a spill or accidental release.
- Sulfide-ore mining is a well-documented cause of catastrophic pollution and could cause catastrophic pollution to a wilderness area. The BWCA is especially vulnerable due to its shallow groundwater and numerous lakes and streams.

The Star Tribune editorial board opposes copper mining so close to the Boundary Waters. It wrote that Congress recently decided that metal mining is too risky to be allowed on public lands near Yellowstone National Park and that a similar buffer zone should be established around the BWCA: "Minnesotans often think of the BWCA as a regional attraction. The reality is that it's a world-class preserve offering an experience that the nation's marquee parks in the arid American West cannot rival. Visitors come from across the nation and around the globe."

Tom Tidwell, who was chief of the U.S. Forest Service from 2009 to 2017, opposes the project and the cancellation of the more in-depth study, saying, "The vast network of waterways in the Boundary Waters region makes it particularly vulnerable to acid mine drainage. The increased acidity and heavy metal pollution could be catastrophic. It would be impossible to contain pollution given the interconnectedness of the waters. Compounding the problem is the absence of natural calcium carbonates, which means the water has virtually no capacity to buffer acid mine drainage."

In 2021, President Biden selected Tom Vilsack, who was secretary of the Department of Agriculture under Obama, to return to the job. Vilsack has been highly critical of the mine proposal. Biden also chose Deb Haaland as Secretary of the Interior, the department that controls the mineral deposits in the forest. Haaland has criticized the Trump administration, saying in 2019, "In places like Minnesota, the Forest Service and [Bureau of Land Management] are jointly responsible for putting valuable freshwater resources at risk from mining pollution."

== See also ==
- Vermilion Range (Minnesota)
- Pebble Mine
