= Greg Boe =

American politician

Member of the Minnesota House of Representatives from the 47B district
- In office January 8, 2019 – January 3, 2023
- Preceded by: Joe Hoppe
- Succeeded by: Lucy Rehm

Personal details
- Born: September 8, 1959 (age 66) Wolsey, South Dakota, U.S.
- Party: Republican
- Spouse: Debbie
- Children: 2
- Education: Minnesota State University, Mankato (BS, MPA)

Greg Boe (born September 8, 1959) is an American politician who served two terms as a Republican member of the Minnesota House of Representatives from District 47B.

== Early life and education ==
Boe was born and raised in Wolsey, South Dakota. He earned a Bachelor of Science degree in environmental science and toxicology, with a minor in chemistry, from Minnesota State University, Mankato. He later received a Master of Public Administration from the same university.

== Career ==
Boe has served as a volunteer and community leader over the years, as a member of the Chaska City Council for 10 years and the city planning commission for nine years before that. He has worked as a department manager for the government of Carver County, Minnesota. and as a major program manager for neighboring Scott County. In addition Boe has also worked in the private-sector, in retail sales and electronic device manufacturing, design, and repair.

=== Minnesota House of Representatives ===
Boe was first elected to the Minnesota House of Representatives in 2018. He served on the Environment and Natural Resources Policy Committee, the Energy and Climate Finance and Policy Division, and the Legacy Finance Division during his first term. For the 20221-2022 biennium, Boe's committee assignments included the Climate and Energy Finance and Policy Division, the Legacy Finance Division, and the Education Policy Committee.

== Personal life ==
Boe and his wife, Debbie, have two grown children. He resides in eastern Carver County.
