= Mike Sundin =

American politician

Member of the Minnesota House of Representatives from the 11A district
- In office January 8, 2013 – January 3, 2023
- Preceded by: redrawn district
- Succeeded by: Jeff Dotseth

Personal details
- Born: October 11, 1957 (age 68)
- Party: Minnesota Democratic–Farmer–Labor Party
- Spouse: Terry
- Children: 3
- Occupation: consultant, retired legislator

Mike Sundin (born October 11, 1957) is a Minnesota politician and former member of the Minnesota House of Representatives. A member of the Minnesota Democratic–Farmer–Labor Party (DFL), he formerly represented District 11A in northeastern Minnesota.

== Early career ==
Sundin served on the Cloquet School Board for five years.

== Minnesota House of Representatives ==
Sundin was first elected to the Minnesota House of Representatives in 2012 as a member of the Democratic Farmer Labor Party of Minnesota. Sundin did not run for reelection in 2022 and was succeeded by Jeff Dotseth.

== Personal life ==
Sundin is married to his wife, Terry. They have three children and reside in Esko, Minnesota. He is a consultant.
