= Susan Akland =

American politician

Member of the Minnesota House of Representatives from the 19A district
- In office January 5, 2021 – January 2, 2023
- Preceded by: Jeff Brand
- Succeeded by: Brian Daniels

Personal details
- Born: March 7, 1949 (age 77)
- Party: Republican
- Spouse: Mark Akland
- Children: 1
- Education: Oklahoma Baptist University (BS)
- Profession: nurse, legislator

Susan Akland (born March 7, 1949) is an American politician and former member of the Minnesota House of Representatives. A Republican, she was elected in 2020 and represented District 19A in south-central Minnesota, which encompasses the whole of Nicollet County, as well as small portions of Le Sueur and Blue Earth counties, and includes the city of St. Peter and North Mankato.

== Political career ==
Akland was first elected in 2020, narrowly defeating DFL incumbent Jeff Brand. Brand then defeated her in a rematch in 2022.

Akland received criticism in 2021, when she was one of many Republican legislators to appear and speak at a self-styled "Storm the Capitol" rally outside of the Minnesota State Capitol in Saint Paul on January 6, which ran concurrent to and endorsed the 2021 United States Capitol attack. She defended herself against calls from the former Representative Brand to step down, claiming that she had been invited to the event by colleague Glenn Gruenhagen and did not know of its nature beforehand. She would later vote to pass a resolution in the House that specifically condemned the Capitol attack in Washington, D.C., and affirmed the results of the 2020 election.

A former healthcare worker, Akland has been supportive of the wearing of masks during the COVID-19 pandemic.

== Personal life ==
Akland is a Christian. She is married to Mark Akland, a physician at the St. Peter Mayo clinic. They have one son, John, and two grandchildren.
