= David K. Dill =

American politician

David Dill

Member of the Minnesota House of Representatives from the 3A district 6A (2003–2013)
- In office January 7, 2003 – August 8, 2015
- Preceded by: redrawn district
- Succeeded by: Rob Ecklund

Personal details
- Born: July 7, 1955 Indianapolis, Indiana
- Died: August 8, 2015 (aged 60) Armstrong, Thunder Bay District, Ontario
- Party: Minnesota Democratic–Farmer–Labor Party
- Spouse: Tucky
- Children: Drake
- Education: Indiana University
- Profession: Commercial pilot, aircraft mechanic, legislator

David K. Dill (July 7, 1955 – August 8, 2015) was an American politician and member of the Minnesota House of Representatives. A member of the Minnesota Democratic–Farmer–Labor Party, he represented District 3A in northeastern Minnesota. He was also a consultant, a commercial pilot and an aircraft and power plant mechanic.

== Early life and career ==
Dill graduated from Southport High School in Indianapolis, Indiana, then attended Indiana University Bloomington. He served as city administrator for Orr, Minnesota for 11 years prior to being elected to the Minnesota House of Representatives.

== Minnesota House of Representatives ==
Dill was first elected to the Minnesota House of Representatives in 2002, and was then re-elected every two years until his death in 2015. He served as chairman of the Iron Range Legislative Delegation during the 2005–2006 biennium.

== Personal life ==
During the summer months, Dill spent time in northwestern Ontario tending to his business, Thunderhook Fly-Ins.

Dill was diagnosed with Type 2 diabetes in his early 20s. He later acknowledged that he did not look after his health, allowing his weight to surpass 300 pounds. In 2008, he underwent gastric bypass surgery, and subsequently lost more than 150 pounds. As a result of diabetic nephropathy, he eventually had only 15% renal function and needed to go on dialysis or have a kidney transplant. He was hoping for a transplant from his sister. He announced that he nevertheless intended to run for re-election. On October 12, 2010, he received a kidney transplant at Hennepin County Medical Center in Minneapolis. The transplant was successful. He later had a pacemaker installed to treat an irregular heartbeat.

== Death ==
Dill was hospitalized at the Mayo Clinic in mid-July 2015 to undergo chemotherapy. He died of cancer on August 8, 2015, at the age of 60, at Camp Thunderhook in Armstrong, Ontario.

A funeral service was held on August 15 at the Backus Community Center in International Falls, Minnesota.
