= Rob Ecklund =

American politician

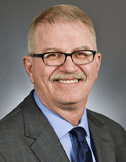

Member of the Minnesota House of Representatives from the 3A district
- In office December 17, 2015 – January 2, 2023
- Preceded by: David Dill
- Succeeded by: Roger Skraba

Personal details
- Born: May 23, 1958 (age 68)
- Party: Minnesota Democratic–Farmer–Labor Party
- Spouse: Joan
- Children: Nick; Jared; Cory
- Education: Rainy River Community College; Bemidji State University
- Occupation: paper machine tender

Robert Ecklund (born May 23, 1958) is a Minnesota politician and former member of the Minnesota House of Representatives. A member of the Minnesota Democratic–Farmer–Labor Party (DFL), he represented District 3A in northeastern Minnesota.

== Early life and career ==
Ecklund was born on May 23, 1958. He is a former United States Marine Corps serviceman, serving from 1976 to 1979. He attended Rainy River Community College and Bemidji State University from 1980 to 1983.

Ecklund has worked since 1989 at the Boise Paper mill in International Falls, Minnesota, as a paper machine tender. He served as president of the United Steelworkers Local 159 for nine years and served on the Koochiching County Board of Commissioners, first elected in 2010 and reelected in 2014.

== Minnesota House of Representatives ==
Ecklund was elected to the Minnesota House of Representatives in a special election on December 8, 2015, after the death of Representative David Dill, also a member of the DFL party. He represented district 3A, serving Cook, Koochiching, Lake, and St. Louis Counties. During the 2017-2018 session, Ecklund served as an assistant minority leader for the DFL party.

2021-2022 committee assignments

- Labor, Industry, Veterans and Military Affairs Finance and Policy (Chair)
- Agriculture Finance and Policy
- Environment and Natural Resources Finance and Policy
- Ways and Means

2019-2020 committee assignments

- Veterans and Military Affairs Finance & Policy Division (Chair)
- Agriculture and Food Finance and Policy
- Environment and Natural Resources Finance Division
- Jobs and Economic Development Finance Division
- Labor
- Ways & Means

2017-2018 committee assignments

- Agriculture Finance
- Capital Investment
- Environment & Natural Resources Policy and Finance
- Environment & Natural Resources Policy and Finance: Subcommittee on Mining, Forestry & Tourism

2016 committee assignments

- Agriculture Finance
- Environment & Natural Resources Policy & Finance
- Greater Minnesota Economic & Workforce Development Policy
- Mining & Outdoor Recreation Policy

== Electoral history ==
2015 Special Election for Minnesota State Representative District 3A
Party	Candidate	Votes	%	±%
Democratic (DFL)	Rob Ecklund	4,591	63.39%	N/A
Republican	Roger Skraba	1,399	19.32%	N/A
Independent	Kelsey Johnson	1,144	15.79%	N/A

2016 Election for Minnesota State Representative District 3A
Party	Candidate	Votes	%	±%
Democratic (DFL)	Rob Ecklund	13,874	63.25%	−0.14%
Republican	Tom Long	8,017	36.55%	+17.23%

2018 Election for Minnesota State Representative District 3A
Party	Candidate	Votes	%	±%
Democratic (DFL)	Rob Ecklund	11,783	59.42%	−3.83%
Republican	Randy Goutermont	8,022	40.45%	+3.90%

2020 Election for Minnesota State Representative District 3A
Party	Candidate	Votes	%	±%
Democratic (DFL)	Rob Ecklund	12,581	52.42%	−7.00%
Republican	Thomas Manninen	11,400	47.50%	+7.05%

== Personal life ==
Ecklund and his wife, Joan, have three children. They reside in International Falls, Minnesota.
