= 92nd Minnesota Legislature =

Legislature of Minnesota, 2021–2023

←	91st	93rd	→
- The Seal of Minnesota

Overview
- Term: January 5, 2021 – January 3, 2023

Senate
- Members: 67 senators
- President: Jeremy Miller (R)
- Majority Leader: Paul Gazelka (R) until September 9, 2021; Jeremy Miller (R) since September 9, 2021
- Minority Leader: Susan Kent (DFL) until September 14, 2021; Melisa Franzen (DFL) since September 14, 2021

House of Representatives
- Members: 134 representatives
- Speaker: Melissa Hortman (DFL)
- Majority Leader: Ryan Winkler (DFL)
- Minority Leader: Kurt Daudt (R)

Sessions
- 2021: January 5, 2021 – May 17, 2021
- 2022: January 31, 2022 – May 23, 2022

Special sessions
- 2021: June 14, 2021 – July 7, 2021

The Ninety-second Minnesota Legislature was the legislature of the U.S. state of Minnesota from January 5, 2021, to January 3, 2023. It was composed of the Senate and House of Representatives, based on the results of the 2020 Senate election and 2020 House election.

== Major events ==
- January 5, 2021: On the first day of the 92nd Minnesota Legislature, new legislators were sworn in via videoconference due to the COVID-19 pandemic.

== Major legislation ==
=== Enacted ===
- March 23, 2021: Uniform Recognition and Enforcement of Canadian Orders for Protection Act (Laws 2021, chapter 6)
- May 25, 2021: Energy Conservation and Optimization Act (Laws 2021, chapter 29)
- Omnibus appropriations acts
  - June 26, 2021: Omnibus higher education act (Laws 2021, First Special Session chapter 2)
  - June 26, 2021: Omnibus agriculture act (Laws 2021, First Special Session chapter 3)
  - June 26, 2021: Omnibus commerce and energy act (Laws 2021, First Special Session chapter 4)
  - June 26, 2021: Omnibus transportation act (Laws 2021, First Special Session chapter 5)
  - June 29, 2021: Omnibus environment and natural resources act (Laws 2021, First Special Session chapter 6)
  - June 29, 2021: Omnibus health and human services act (Laws 2021, First Special Session chapter 7)
  - June 29, 2021: Omnibus housing act (Laws 2021, First Special Session chapter 8)
  - June 30, 2021: Omnibus capital investment act (Laws 2021, First Special Session chapter 9)
  - June 30, 2021: Omnibus workforce and labor act (Laws 2021, First Special Session chapter 10)
  - June 30, 2021: Omnibus public safety and judiciary act (Laws 2021, First Special Session chapter 11)
  - June 30, 2021: Omnibus state government, military affairs, and veterans affairs act (Laws 2021, First Special Session chapter 12)
  - June 30, 2021: Omnibus education act (Laws 2021, First Special Session chapter 13)
- June 26, 2021: Omnibus legacy act (Laws 2021, First Special Session chapter 1)
- July 1, 2021: Omnibus tax act (Laws 2021, First Special Session chapter 14)
- April 29, 2022: Unemployment insurance and frontline worker payments act (Laws 2022, chapter 50)
- May 10, 2022: Supplementary veterans and military affairs act (Laws 2022, chapter 50)
- May 22, 2022: Supplementary legacy act (Laws 2022, chapter 77)
- May 22, 2022: Omnibus liquor act (Laws 2022, chapter 86)
- May 26, 2022: Omnibus drought relief and rural broadband act (Laws 2022, chapter 95)
- June 2, 2022: Omnibus mental health act (Laws 2022, chapter 99)
- June 3, 2022: Environment and natural resources trust fund act (Laws 2022, chapter 94)

=== Proposed ===
Boldface indicates the bill was passed by its house of origin.
- Omnibus cannabis bill (**H.F. 600**/S.F. 757)
- Sports betting bill (**H.F. 778**/S.F. 574)
- Universal school lunch and breakfast bill (H.F. 1729)
- Supplemental education finance and policy bill (H.F. 3401/S.F. 2822)
- Transgender sanctuary state bill (H.F. 4822/S.F. 4525)
- Proposed constitutional amendment establishing a fundamental right to a quality public education bill (H.F. 874)
- Parental rights in schools bill (H.F. 3436/S.F. 2909)
- Right to counsel in public housing evictions bill (H.F. 450/S.F. 1290)

== Political composition ==
Resignations and new members are discussed in the "Changes in membership" section below.

=== Senate ===
	Party (Shading indicates majority caucus)			Total	Vacant
	Republican	Independent	Democratic– Farmer–Labor	Total	Vacant
End of the previous legislature	35	2	30	67	0
Start of session	34	2	31	67	0
From Aug. 11, 2022	34	1	31	66	1
Latest voting share	51%	1%	46%		

Senate composition 34 Republican 31 DFL 2 Independent

=== House of Representatives ===
	Party (Shading indicates majority caucus)					Total	Vacant
	Democratic– Farmer–Labor	Independent	Republican			Total	Vacant
	Democratic– Farmer–Labor	Independent	Republican	New (Note: Four Republicans announced on December 8, 2018, they would not join the Republican caucus in the 91st Legislature and would instead form their own caucus, the "New House Republican Caucus.")	None (Note: Erik Mortensen was removed from the New House Republican Caucus. Minority Leader Daudt confirmed that Mortensen would not be welcome in the main Republican caucus.")	Total	Vacant
End of the previous Legislature	75	0	55	4	0	134	0
Start of session	70	0	59	5	0	134	0
From May 17, 2021	70	0	59	4	1	134	0
From Sep. 14, 2021	69	1	59	4	1	134	0
From Aug. 5, 2022	69	1	58	4	1	133	1
Latest voting share	51.5%	0.7%	43.3%	3%	0.7%		

House composition by caucus 69 DFL 59 Republican 4 New Republican 1 Independent Republican 1 Independent

== Leadership ==
=== Senate ===
- President: Jeremy Miller (R)
- President pro tempore: David Tomassoni (I) (until August 11, 2022)

==== Majority (Republican) leadership ====
- Majority Leader:
  - Paul Gazelka (until September, 2021)
  - Jeremy Miller (since September 9, 2021)
- Deputy Majority Leader: Mark Johnson
- Assistant Majority Leaders:
  - Roger Chamberlain
  - Zach Duckworth
  - Karin Housley
  - John Jasinski
  - Bill Weber

==== Minority (DFL) leadership ====
- Minority Leader:
  - Susan Kent (until September, 2021)
  - Melisa Franzen (since September 14, 2021)
- Assistant Minority Leaders:
  - Nick Frentz
  - Mary Kunesh
  - Foung Hawj
- Minority Whips:
  - Kent Eken
  - John Hoffman
  - Ann Rest

=== House of Representatives ===
- Speaker: Melissa Hortman (DFL)
- Speaker pro tempore: Liz Olson (DFL)

==== Majority (DFL) leadership ====
- Deputy Majority Leader: Liz Olson (DFL)
- Majority Leader: Ryan Winkler
- Majority Whip: Kaohly Vang Her
- Assistant Majority Leaders:
  - Heather Edelson
  - Emma Greenman
  - Michael Howard
  - Todd Lippert
  - Kelly Morrison
  - Dan Wolgamott

==== Minority (Republican) leadership ====
- Minority Leader: Kurt Daudt
- Deputy Minority Leader: Anne Neu Brindley
- Assistant Minority Leaders:
  - Dave Baker
  - Peggy Bennett
  - Lisa Demuth
  - Jim Nash
  - Paul Novotny
  - Bjorn Olson
  - Peggy Scott
  - Paul Torkelson

== Members ==
=== Senate ===
Senate districts Republican DFL Independent

District	Name	Party	Residence	First elected
1	Mark Johnson	Republican	East Grand Forks	2016
2	Paul Utke	Republican	Park Rapids	2016
3	Tom Bakk	Independent	Cook	2002
4	Kent Eken	DFL	Twin Valley	2012
5	Justin Eichorn	Republican	Grand Rapids	2016
6	David Tomassoni	Independent	Chisholm	2000
7	Jen McEwen	DFL	Duluth	2020
8	Bill Ingebrigtsen	Republican	Alexandria	2006
9	Paul Gazelka	Republican	Nisswa	2010
10	Carrie Ruud	Republican	Breezy Point	2002 (Note: Lost re-election in 2006. Elected again in 2012.)
11	Jason Rarick	Republican	Pine City	2019 (Note: Elected in a special election.)
12	Torrey Westrom	Republican	Elbow Lake	2012
13	Jeff Howe	Republican	Rockville	2018
14	Aric Putnam	DFL	St. Cloud	2020
15	Andrew Mathews	Republican	Milaca	2016
16	Gary Dahms	Republican	Redwood Falls	2010
17	Andrew Lang	Republican	Olivia	2016
18	Scott Newman	Republican	Hutchinson	2010
19	Nick Frentz	DFL	North Mankato	2016
20	Rich Draheim	Republican	Madison Lake	2016
21	Mike Goggin	Republican	Red Wing	2016
22	Bill Weber	Republican	Luverne	2012
23	Julie Rosen	Republican	Vernon Center	2002
24	John Jasinski	Republican	Faribault	2016
25	Dave Senjem	Republican	Rochester	2002
26	Carla Nelson	Republican	Rochester	2010
27	Gene Dornink	Republican	Austin	2020
28	Jeremy Miller	Republican	Winona	2010
29	Bruce Anderson	Republican	Buffalo Township	2012
30	Mary Kiffmeyer	Republican	Big Lake	2012
31	Michelle Benson	Republican	Ham Lake	2010
32	Mark Koran	Republican	North Branch	2016
33	David Osmek	Republican	Mound	2012
34	Warren Limmer	Republican	Maple Grove	1995
35	Jim Abeler	Republican	Anoka	2016
36	John Hoffman	DFL	Champlin	2012
37	Jerry Newton	DFL	Coon Rapids	2016
38	Roger Chamberlain	Republican	Lino Lakes	2010
39	Karin Housley	Republican	Stillwater	2012
40	Chris Eaton	DFL	Brooklyn Center	2011
41	Mary Kunesh-Podein	DFL	New Brighton	2020
42	Jason Isaacson	DFL	Shoreview	2016
43	Chuck Wiger	DFL	Maplewood	1996
44	Ann Johnson Stewart	DFL	Plymouth	2020
45	Ann Rest	DFL	New Hope	2000
46	Ron Latz	DFL	St. Louis Park	2006
47	Julia Coleman	Republican	Chanhassen	2020
48	Steve Cwodzinski	DFL	Eden Prairie	2016
49	Melisa Franzen	DFL	Edina	2012
50	Melissa Halvorson Wiklund	DFL	Bloomington	2012
51	Jim Carlson	DFL	Eagan	2006 (Note: Lost re-election 2010. Elected again in 2012.)
52	Matt Klein	DFL	Mendota Heights	2016
53	Susan Kent	DFL	Woodbury	2012
54	Karla Bigham	DFL	Cottage Grove	2018
55	Eric Pratt	Republican	Prior Lake	2012
56	Lindsey Port	DFL	Burnsville	2020
57	Greg Clausen	DFL	Apple Valley	2012
58	Zach Duckworth	Republican	Lakeville	2020
59	Bobby Joe Champion	DFL	Minneapolis	2012
60	Kari Dziedzic	DFL	Minneapolis	2012
61	Scott Dibble	DFL	Minneapolis	2002
62	Omar Fateh	DFL	Minneapolis	2020
63	Patricia Torres Ray	DFL	Minneapolis	2006
64	Erin Murphy	DFL	Saint Paul	2020
65	Sandy Pappas	DFL	Saint Paul	1990
66	John Marty	DFL	Roseville	1986
67	Foung Hawj	DFL	Saint Paul	2012

=== House ===
House districts by caucus DFL Republican New Republican Republican (no caucus) Independent

District		Name	Caucus	Residence	First elected
1	A	John Burkel	Republican	Badger	2020
1	B	Deb Kiel	Republican	Crookston	2010
2	A	Matt Grossell	Republican	Clearbrook	2016
2	B	Steve Green	Republican	Fosston	2012
3	A	Rob Ecklund	DFL	International Falls	2015 (Note: Elected in a special election.)
3	B	Mary Murphy	DFL	Hermantown	1976
4	A	Heather Keeler	DFL	Moorhead	2020
4	B	Paul Marquart	DFL	Dilworth	2000
5	A	Matt Bliss	Republican	Pennington	2020
5	B	Spencer Igo	Republican	Grand Rapids	2020
6	A	Julie Sandstede	DFL	Hibbing	2016
6	B	Dave Lislegard	DFL	Aurora	2018
7	A	Jennifer Schultz	DFL	Duluth	2014
7	B	Liz Olson	DFL	Duluth	2016
8	A	Jordan Rasmusson	Republican	Fergus Falls	2020
8	B	Mary Franson	Republican	Alexandria	2010
9	A	John Poston	Republican	Lake Shore	2016
9	B	Ron Kresha	Republican	Little Falls	2012
10	A	Josh Heintzeman	Republican	Nisswa	2014
10	B	Dale Lueck	Republican	Aitkin	2014
11	A	Mike Sundin	DFL	Esko	2012
11	B	Nathan Nelson	Republican	Hinckley	2019
12	A	Jeff Backer	Republican	Browns Valley	2014
12	B	Paul Anderson	Republican	Starbuck	2008
13	A	Lisa Demuth	Republican	Cold Spring	2018
13	B	Tim O'Driscoll	Republican	Sartell	2010
14	A	Tama Theis	Republican	St. Cloud	2013
14	B	Dan Wolgamott	DFL	St. Cloud	2018
15	A	Sondra Erickson	Republican	Princeton	1998 (Note: Elected in a special election. Lost re-election in 2008. Elected again in 2010.)
15	B	Shane Mekeland	Republican	Clear Lake	2018
16	A	Chris Swedzinski	Republican	Ghent	2010
16	B	Paul Torkelson	Republican	Hanska	2008
17	A	Tim Miller	New Republican	Prinsburg	2014
17	B	Dave Baker	Republican	Willmar	2014
18	A	Dean Urdahl	Republican	Grove City	2002
18	B	Glenn Gruenhagen	Republican	Glencoe	2010
19	A	Susan Akland	Republican	St. Peter	2020
19	B	Luke Frederick	DFL	Mankato	2020
20	A	Brian Pfarr	Republican	Le Sueur	2020
20	B	Todd Lippert	DFL	Northfield	2018
21	A	Barb Haley	Republican	Red Wing	2016
21	B	Steve Drazkowski	New Republican	Mazeppa	2007
22	A	Joe Schomacker	Republican	Luverne	2010
22	B	Rod Hamilton	Republican	Mountain Lake	2004
23	A	Bjorn Olson	Republican	Elmore	2020
23	B	Jeremy Munson	New Republican	Lake Crystal	2018
24	A	John Petersburg	Republican	Waseca	2012
24	B	Brian Daniels	Republican	Faribault	2014
25	A	Duane Quam	Republican	Byron	2010
25	B	Liz Boldon	DFL	Rochester	2020
26	A	Tina Liebling	DFL	Rochester	2004
26	B	Nels Pierson	Republican	Rochester	2014
27	A	Peggy Bennett	Republican	Albert Lea	2014
27	B	Patricia Mueller	Republican	Austin	2020
28	A	Gene Pelowski	DFL	Winona	1986
28	B	Greg Davids	Republican	Preston	1991 (Note: Elected in a special election. Lost re-election in 2006. Elected again in 2008.)
29	A	Joe McDonald	Republican	Delano	2010
29	B	Marion O'Neill	Republican	Maple Lake	2012
30	A	Paul Novotny	Republican	Elk River	2020
30	B	Eric Lucero	Republican	Dayton	2014
31	A	Kurt Daudt	Republican	Crown	2010
31	B	Cal Bahr	New Republican	East Bethel	2016
32	A	Brian Johnson	Republican	Castle Rock	2012
32	B	Anne Neu	Republican	North Branch	2017
33	A	Jerry Hertaus	Republican	Greenfield	2012
33	B	Kelly Morrison	DFL	Deephaven	2018
34	A	Kristin Robbins	Republican	Maple Grove	2018
34	B	Kristin Bahner	DFL	Maple Grove	2018
35	A	John Heinrich	Republican	Anoka	2018
35	B	Peggy Scott	Republican	Andover	2008
36	A	Zack Stephenson	DFL	Coon Rapids	2018
36	B	Melissa Hortman	DFL	Brooklyn Park	2004
37	A	Erin Koegel	DFL	Spring Lake Park	2016
37	B	Nolan West	Republican	Blaine	2016
38	A	Donald Raleigh	Republican	Circle Pines	2020
38	B	Ami Wazlawik	DFL	White Bear Township	2018
39	A	Bob Dettmer	Republican	Forest Lake	2006
39	B	Shelly Christensen	DFL	Stillwater	2018
40	A	Mike Nelson	DFL	Brooklyn Park	2002
40	B	Samantha Vang	DFL	Brooklyn Center	2018
41	A	Connie Bernardy	DFL	New Brighton	2000 (Note: Did not seek re-election in 2006. Elected again in 2012.)
41	B	Sandra Feist	DFL	New Brighton	2020
42	A	Kelly Moller	DFL	Shoreview	2018
42	B	Jamie Becker-Finn	DFL	Roseville	2016
43	A	Peter Fischer	DFL	Maplewood	2012
43	B	Leon Lillie	DFL	North St. Paul	2004
44	A	Ginny Klevorn	DFL	Plymouth	2018
44	B	Patty Acomb	DFL	Minnetonka	2018
45	A	Cedrick Frazier	DFL	New Hope	2020
45	B	Mike Freiberg	DFL	Golden Valley	2012
46	A	Ryan Winkler	DFL	Golden Valley	2006 (Note: Resigned effective July 1, 2015. Elected again in 2018.)
46	B	Cheryl Youakim	DFL	Hopkins	2014
47	A	Jim Nash	Republican	Waconia	2014
47	B	Greg Boe	Republican	Chaska	2018
48	A	Laurie Pryor	DFL	Minnetonka	2016
48	B	Carlie Kotyza-Witthuhn	DFL	Eden Prairie	2018
49	A	Heather Edelson	DFL	Edina	2018
49	B	Steve Elkins	DFL	Bloomington	2018
50	A	Michael Howard	DFL	Richfield	2018
50	B	Andrew Carlson	DFL	Bloomington	2016
51	A	Sandra Masin	DFL	Eagan	2006 (Note: Lost re-election in 2010. Elected again in 2012.)
51	B	Liz Reyer	DFL	Eagan	2020
52	A	Rick Hansen	DFL	South St. Paul	2004
52	B	Ruth Richardson	DFL	Mendota Heights	2018
53	A	Tou Xiong	DFL	Maplewood	2018
53	B	Steve Sandell	DFL	Woodbury	2018
54	A	Keith Franke	Republican	St. Paul Park	2020
54	B	Tony Jurgens	Republican	Cottage Grove	2016
55	A	Erik Mortensen	Republican (no caucus)	Shakopee	2020
55	B	Tony Albright	Republican	Prior Lake	2012
56	A	Jessica Hanson	DFL	Burnsville	2020
56	B	Kaela Berg	DFL	Burnsville	2020
57	A	Robert Bierman	DFL	Apple Valley	2018
57	B	John Huot	DFL	Rosemount	2018
58	A	Jon Koznick	Republican	Lakeville	2014
58	B	Pat Garofalo	Republican	Farmington	2004
59	A	Fue Lee	DFL	Minneapolis	2016
59	B	Esther Agbaje	DFL	Minneapolis	2020
60	A	Sydney Jordan	DFL	Minneapolis	2020
60	B	Mohamud Noor	DFL	Minneapolis	2018
61	A	Frank Hornstein	DFL	Minneapolis	2002
61	B	Jamie Long	DFL	Minneapolis	2018
62	A	Hodan Hassan	DFL	Minneapolis	2018
62	B	Aisha Gomez	DFL	Minneapolis	2018
63	A	Jim Davnie	DFL	Minneapolis	2000
63	B	Emma Greenman	DFL	Minneapolis	2020
64	A	Kaohly Her	DFL	Saint Paul	2018
64	B	Dave Pinto	DFL	Saint Paul	2014
65	A	Rena Moran	DFL	Saint Paul	2010
65	B	Carlos Mariani	DFL	Saint Paul	1990
66	A	Alice Hausman	DFL	Saint Paul	1989
66	B	Athena Hollins	DFL	Saint Paul	2020
67	A	John Thompson	Independent	Saint Paul	2020 (Note: Elected in 2020 as a member of the DFL, Effective September 15, 2021, Thompson will serve as an independent after being expelled from the DFL caucus.)
67	B	Jay Xiong	DFL	Saint Paul	2018

=== Demographics ===
==== Gender ====
129 (64.2%) members of the 92nd Legislature were male, while 72 (35.8%) were female. The House had a slightly higher proportion of women than the Senate.

==== Race and ethnicity ====
27 legislators identified themselves or were identified in a newspaper or book as a member of a minority group.

- Not a minority: 174 (86.6%)
- A minority: 27 (13.4%)
  - Black (ex. Somali): 8 (5.7%)
  - Hispanic: 6 (3.0%)
  - Hmong: 6 (3.0%)
  - American Indian: 4 (2.0%)
  - Somali: 3 (1.5%)

==== Education ====
32 members (15.9%) had doctoral-level degrees.

== Changes in membership ==
=== Senate ===
- Sen. David Tomassoni died August 11, 2022.

=== House of Representatives ===
- Rep. Tony Albright resigned effective August 5, 2022.

== Committees ==
=== Senate ===
- Aging and Long-Term Care Policy (Chair: Housley, Vice-Chair: Koran, DFL Lead: Eken)
- Agriculture and Rural Development Finance andPolicy (Chair: Westrom, Vice-Chair Dahms, DFL Lead: Murphy)
- Capital Investment (Chair: Bakk, Vice-Chair: Senjem, DFL Lead: Pappas)
- Civil Law and Data Practices Policy (Chair: Mathews, Vice-Chair: Limmer, DFL Lead: Bigham)
- Commerce and Consumer Protection Finance andPolicy (Chair: Dahms, Vice-Chair: Howe, DFL Lead: Kent)
- Education Finance and Policy (Chair: Chamberlain, Vice-Chair: Eichorn, DFL Lead: Wiger)
- Energy and Utilities Finance and Policy (Chair: Senjem, Vice-Chair: Mathews, DFL Lead: Frentz)
- Environment and Natural Resources Finance (Chair: Ingebrigtsen, Vice-Chair: Rudd, DFL Lead: Torres Ray)
- Environment and Natural Resources Policy and Legacy Finance (Chair: Rudd, Vice-Chair: Weber, DFL Lead: Hawj)
- Finance (Chair: Rosen, Vice-Chair: Ingebrigtsen, DFL Lead: Marty)
- Health and Human Services Finance and Policy (Chair: Utke, Vice-Chair: Draheim, DFL Lead: Wiklund)
- Higher Education Finance and Policy (Chair: Tomassoni, Vice-Chair: Rarick, DFL Lead: Clausen)
- Housing Finance and Policy (Chair: Draheim, Vice-Chair: Duckworth, DFL Lead: Dziedzic)
- Human Services Licensing Policy (Chair: Benson, Vice-Chair: Abeler, DFL Lead: Eaton)
- Human Services Reform Finance and Policy (Chair: Abeler, Vice-Chair: Benson, DFL Lead: Hoffman)
- Jobs and Economic Growth Finance and Policy (Chair: Pratt, Vice-Chair: Housley, DFL Lead: Champion)
- Judiciary and Public Safety Finance and Policy (Chair: Limmer, Vice-Chair: Johnson, DFL Lead: Latz)
- Labor and Industry Policy (Chair: Rarick, Vice-Chair: Dornink, DFL Lead: McEwen)
- Local Government Policy (Chair: Jasinski, Vice-Chair: Newman, DFL Lead: Cwodzinski)
- Mining and Forestry Policy (Chair: Eichorn, Vice-Chair Goggin, DFL Lead: Kunesh)
- Redistricting (Chair: Johnson, Vice-Chair: Kiffmeyer, DFL Lead: Isaacson)
- Rules and Administration (Chair: Miller, Vice-Chair: Johnson), DFL Lead: Franzen)
- State Government Finance and Policy and Elections (Chair: Kiffmeyer, Vice-Chair: Howe, DFL Lead: Carlson)
- Taxes (Chair: Nelson, Vice-Chair: Coleman, DFL Lead: Rest)
  - Subcommittee on Property Taxes (Chair: Weber, Vice-Chair Chamberlain, DFL Lead: Klein)
- Technology and Reform Policy (Chair: Koran, Vice-Chair: Westrom, DFL Lead: Port_
- Transportation Finance and Policy (Chair: Newman, Vice-Chair: Jasinski, DFL Lead: Dibble)
- Veterans and Military Affairs Finance and Policy (Chair: Lang, Vice-Chair: Anderson, DFL Lead: Newton)

=== House of Representatives ===
- Agriculture Finance and Policy (Chair: Sundin, Vice-Chair: Vang, GOP Lead: Anderson)
- Capital Investment (Chair: Lee, Vice-Chair: Murphy, GOP Lead: Urdhal)
- Climate and Energy Finance and Policy (Chair: Long, Vice-Chair: Acomb, GOP Lead: Swedzinski)
- Commerce Finance and Policy (Chair: Stephenson, Vice-Chair: Kotyza-Witthuhn, GOP Lead: O'Driscoll)
- Early Childhood Finance and Policy (Chair: Pinto, Vice-Chair: Pryor, GOP Lead: Franson)
- Education Finance (Chair: Davnie, Vice-Chair: Sandstede, GOP Lead: Kresha)
- Education Policy (Chair: Richardson, Vice-Chair: Hassan, GOP Lead: Erickson)
- Environment and Natural Resources Finance and Policy (Chair: Hansen, Vice-Chair: Wazlawik, GOP Lead: Heintzeman)
- Ethics (Chair: Davnie, GOP Lead Erickson)
- Health Finance and Policy (Chair: Liebling, Vice-Chair: Huot, GOP Lead: Schomacker)
  - Preventative Health Policy Division (Chair: Freiberg, Vice-Chair: Bierman, GOP Lead: Gruenhagen)
- Higher Education Finance and Policy (Chair: Bernardy, Vice-Chair: Christensen, GOP Lead: O'Neill)
- Housing Finance and Policy (Chair: Hausman, Vice-Chair: Howard, GOP Lead: Theis)
- Human Services Finance and Policy (Chair: Schultz, Vice-Chair: Bahner, GOP Lead: Albright)
  - Behavioral Health Policy Division (Chair: Fischer, Vice-Chair: Frederick, GOP Lead: Franke)
  - Preventing Homelessness Division (Chair: Gomez, Vice-Chair: Keeler, GOP Lead: Neu Brindley)
- Industrial Education and Economic Development Finance and Policy (Chair: Pelowski, Vice-Chair: Sandell, GOP Lead: Kiel)
- Judiciary Finance and Civil Law (Chair: Becker-Finn, Vice-Chair: Moeller, GOP Lead: Scott)
- Labor, Industry, Veterans and Military Affairs (Chair: Ecklund, Vice-Chair Xiong, T., Co-GOP Leads: Dettmer, McDonald)
- Legacy Finance (Chair: Lillie, Vice-Chair: Jordan, GOP Lead: Green)
- Public Safety and Criminal Justice Reform Finance and Policy (Chair: Mariani, Vice-Chair: Frazier, GOP Lead: Johnson)
- Redistricting (Chair: Murphy, Vice-Chair: Klevorn, GOP Lead: Torkelson)
- Rules and Legislative Administration (Chair: Winkler, Vice-Chair: Agbaje, GOP Lead: Daudt)
  - Subcommittee on Legislative Process Reform (Chair: Pelowski, Vice-Chair: Wolgamott, GOP Lead: Daudt)
- State Government Finance and Elections (Chair: Nelson, M., Vice-Chair: Carlson, GOP Lead: Nash)
  - Local Government Division (Chair: Masin, Vice-Chair: Elkins, GOP Lead: Quam)
- Taxes (Chair: Marquart, Vice-Chair: Lislegard, GOP Lead: Davids)
  - Property Taxes Division (Chair: Youakim, Vice-Chair: Gomez, GOP Lead: Hertaus)
- Transportation Finance and Policy (Chair: Hornstein, Vice-Chair Koegel, GOP Lead: Petersburg)
- Ways and Means (Chair: Moran, Vice-Chair: Olson, L., GOP Lead: Garofalo)
- Workforce and Business Development (Chair: Noor, Vice-Chair: Xiong, J., GOP Lead: Hamilton)

== Administrative officers ==
=== Senate ===
- Secretary: Cal Ludeman
- First Assistant Secretary: Colleen Pacheco
- Second Assistant Secretary: Mike Linn
- Engrossing Secretary: Melissa Mapes
- Sergeant at Arms: Sven Lindquist
- Assistant Sergeant at Arms: Marilyn Logan
- Chaplain: Mike Smith

=== House of Representatives ===
- Chief Clerk: Patrick Murphy
- First Assistant Chief Clerk: Tim Johnson
- Second Assistant Chief Clerk: Gail Romanowski
- Chief Sergeant at Arms: Bob Meyerson
- Assistant Sergeant at Arms: Erica Brynildson
- Assistant Sergeant at Arms: Andrew Olson
- Index Clerk: Carl Hamre
