= 91st Minnesota Legislature =

Legislature of Minnesota, 2019–2021

←	90th	92nd	→

Overview
- Term: January 8, 2019 – January 4, 2021

Senate
- Members: 67 senators
- President: Jeremy Miller (R) until November 12, 2020; David Tomassoni (Independent) from November 12, 2020
- Majority Leader: Paul Gazelka (R)
- Minority Leader: Tom Bakk (DFL) until February 1, 2020; Susan Kent (DFL) from February 1, 2020

House of Representatives
- Members: 134 representatives
- Speaker: Melissa Hortman (DFL)
- Majority Leader: Ryan Winkler (DFL)
- Minority Leader: Kurt Daudt (R)

Sessions
- 2019: January 8, 2019 – May 20, 2019
- 2020: February 11, 2020 – May 18, 2020

Special sessions
- 2019, 1st: May 24, 2019 – May 25, 2019
- 2020, 1st: June 12, 2020 – June 20, 2020
- 2020, 2nd: July 13, 2020 – July 21, 2020
- 2020, 3rd: August 12, 2020
- 2020, 4th: September 11, 2020
- 2020, 5th: October 12, 2020 – October 15, 2020
- 2020, 6th: November 12, 2020

The Ninety-first Minnesota Legislature was the legislature of the U.S. state of Minnesota from January 8, 2019 to January 4, 2021. It was composed of the Senate and House of Representatives, based on the results of the 2016 Senate election and 2018 House election. It first convened and held its regular session in Saint Paul from January 8 to May 20, 2019, and from February 11 to May 18, 2020. In addition, seven special sessions were held this term, the most of any term in state history.

== Major events ==
- April 3, 2019: Governor Tim Walz delivered his first State of the State Address.
- May 9, 2019: A joint convention of the Senate and House of Representatives was held to elect regents of the University of Minnesota.
- May 24-25, 2019: A special session was held to pass bills enacting the state budget following an agreement between the governor and legislative leaders during the final weekend of the regular session in 2019.
- April 5, 2020: Walz delivered his second State of the State Address. Originally scheduled to be held on March 23 in the House chamber, it was postponed and moved to the governor's residence due to the COVID-19 pandemic.
- June 12-20, 2020: A special session was held, required by state law as Governor Tim Walz extended Minnesota's peacetime emergency in response to the COVID-19 pandemic. It also followed the murder of George Floyd in Minneapolis and the subsequent protests. Walz and several legislators said they intended to use the special session to address concerns raised by Floyd's murder related to racial inequities in policing, on which the House and Senate were unable to reach an agreement. They were also unable to reach agreements on a public works borrowing bill, appropriating money from the CARES Act to local governments, and assistance for Minneapolis and Saint Paul for damage caused by riots in those cities. Senate Majority Leader Paul Gazelka had said at the beginning of the special session Republicans would adjourn the Senate by June 19 regardless of whatever legislation had or had not been passed by the Legislature, which House Speaker Melissa Hortman said was an arbitrary deadline. Gazelka said at the end of the special session a deadline was needed to force discussions and that he was willing to return for another special session when there were agreements on these issues.
- July 10, 2020: Walz called a third special session that was held from July 13 to 21, 2020, as he again extended the peacetime emergency. The Legislature passed a bill on police reform, but was unable to reach an agreement on a public works borrowing bill.
- Five more special sessions were called by the Governor throughout the remainder of the year, all to approve the extension of the COVID-19 peacetime emergency.

== Major legislation ==
=== Enacted ===
- April 12, 2019: Hands-free cell phone use while driving act (Laws 2019, chapter 11)
- May 2, 2019: Voluntary relationship defense for criminal sexual conduct repeal act (Laws 2019, chapter 16)
- May 22, 2019: Assisted living act (Laws 2019, chapter 60)
- May 22, 2019: Opioid addiction prevention and treatment act (Laws 2019, chapter 63)
- Omnibus appropriations acts:
  - May 22, 2019: Omnibus higher education act (Laws 2019, chapter 64)
  - May 30, 2019: Omnibus agriculture, housing, and rural development act (Laws 2019, First Special Session chapter 1)
  - May 30, 2019: Omnibus transportation act (Laws 2019, First Special Session chapter 3)
  - May 30, 2019: Omnibus environment and natural resources act (Laws 2019, First Special Session chapter 4)
  - May 30, 2019: Omnibus judiciary and public safety act (Laws 2019, First Special Session chapter 5)
  - May 30, 2019: Omnibus jobs, economic development, and energy act (Laws 2019, First Special Session chapter 7)
  - May 30, 2019: Omnibus health and human services act (Laws 2019, First Special Session chapter 9)
  - May 30, 2019: Omnibus state government act (Laws 2019, First Special Session chapter 10)
  - May 30, 2019: Omnibus education act (Laws 2019, First Special Session chapter 11)
- May 30, 2019: Omnibus legacy act (Laws 2019, First Special Session chapter 2)
- May 30, 2019: Omnibus tax act (Laws 2019, First Special Session chapter 6)
- March 10, 2020: COVID-19 pandemic response act (Laws 2020, chapter 66)
- March 17, 2020: COVID-19 pandemic response act (Laws 2020, chapter 70)
- March 28, 2020: COVID-19 pandemic response act (Laws 2020, chapter 71)
- April 7, 2020: COVID-19 first responders workers' compensation act (Laws 2020, chapter 72)
- April 15, 2020: Alec Smith Insulin Affordability Act (Laws 2020, chapter 73)
- April 15, 2020: COVID-19 pandemic response act (Laws 2020, chapter 74)
- May 12, 2020: 2020 elections special procedures act (Laws 2020, chapter 77)
- May 27, 2020: Outdoor heritage fund appropriations act (Laws 2020, chapter 104)
- July 23, 2020: Police reform act (Laws 2020, Second Special Session chapter 1)
- October 21, 2020: Omnibus capital investment "bonding" act (Laws 2020, Fifth Special Session chapter 3)

=== Proposed ===
Boldface indicates the bill was passed by its house of origin.

- Clean Energy First Act (H.F. No. 1405/S.F. No. 1456)
- Energy Conservation and Optimization Act of 2020 (**H.F. No. 4502**/S.F. No. 4409)
- Extreme risk protection order bill (**H.F. No. 9**/S.F. No. 436)
- Family leave insurance bill (**H.F. No. 5**/S.F. No. 1060)
- Firearm transfer background check bill (**H.F. No. 8**/S.F. No. 3426)
- Omnibus environment and natural resources bill (**H.F. No. 4554**/**S.F. No. 4499**)
- Proposed constitutional amendment establishing a fundamental right to a quality public education bill (H.F. No. 3658/S.F. No. 3977)
- Recreational cannabis bill (H.F. No. 420/S.F. No. 619)
- Voting rights restoration for felons bill (H.F. No. 40/S.F. No. 856)

== Political composition ==
Resignations and new members are discussed in the "Changes in membership" section below.

=== Senate ===
Senate composition 35 Republican 30 DFL 2 Independent

	Party (Shading indicates majority caucus)			Total	Vacant
	Republican	Democratic– Farmer–Labor	Independent	Total	Vacant
End of the previous Legislature	34	32	0	66	1
Begin (January 8, 2019)	34	32	0	66	1
February 13, 2019	35	32	0	67	0
November 18, 2020	35	30	2	67	0
Latest voting share	52.2%	44.8%	3%		

=== House of Representatives ===
House composition by caucus 75 DFL 55 Republican 4 New Republican

	Party (Shading indicates majority caucus)			Total	Vacant
	Democratic– Farmer–Labor	Republican		Total	Vacant
	Democratic– Farmer–Labor	Republican Caucus	New Republican Caucus	Total	Vacant
End of the previous Legislature	55	75	0	130	4
Begin (January 8, 2019)	74	55	4	133	1
January 10, 2019	75	55	4	134	0
February 12, 2019	75	54	4	133	1
March 27, 2019	75	55	4	134	0
November 16, 2019	74	55	4	133	1
December 6, 2019	74	54	4	132	2
February 11, 2020	75	55	4	134	0
Latest voting share	56%	41%	3%		

== Leadership ==
=== Senate ===
- President:
  - Jeremy Miller (R) (until November 12, 2020)
  - David Tomassoni (I) (from November 12, 2020)
- President pro tempore: Mary Kiffmeyer (R)

==== Majority (Republican) leadership ====
- Majority Leader: Paul Gazelka
- Deputy Majority Leader: Michelle Benson
- Assistant Majority Leaders:
  - Gary Dahms
  - Karin Housley
  - John Jasinski
  - Warren Limmer
  - Eric Pratt
- Majority Whips:
  - John Jasinski
  - Eric Pratt

==== Minority (DFL) leadership ====
- Minority Leader:
  - Tom Bakk (until February 1, 2020)
  - Susan Kent (from February 1, 2020)
- Assistant Minority Leaders:
  - Nick Frentz (from February 7, 2020)
  - Jeff Hayden
  - Susan Kent (until February 1, 2020)
  - Carolyn Laine
  - Erik Simonson (from February 7, 2020)
- Minority Whips:
  - Ann Rest
  - Kent Eken
  - John Hoffman

=== House of Representatives ===
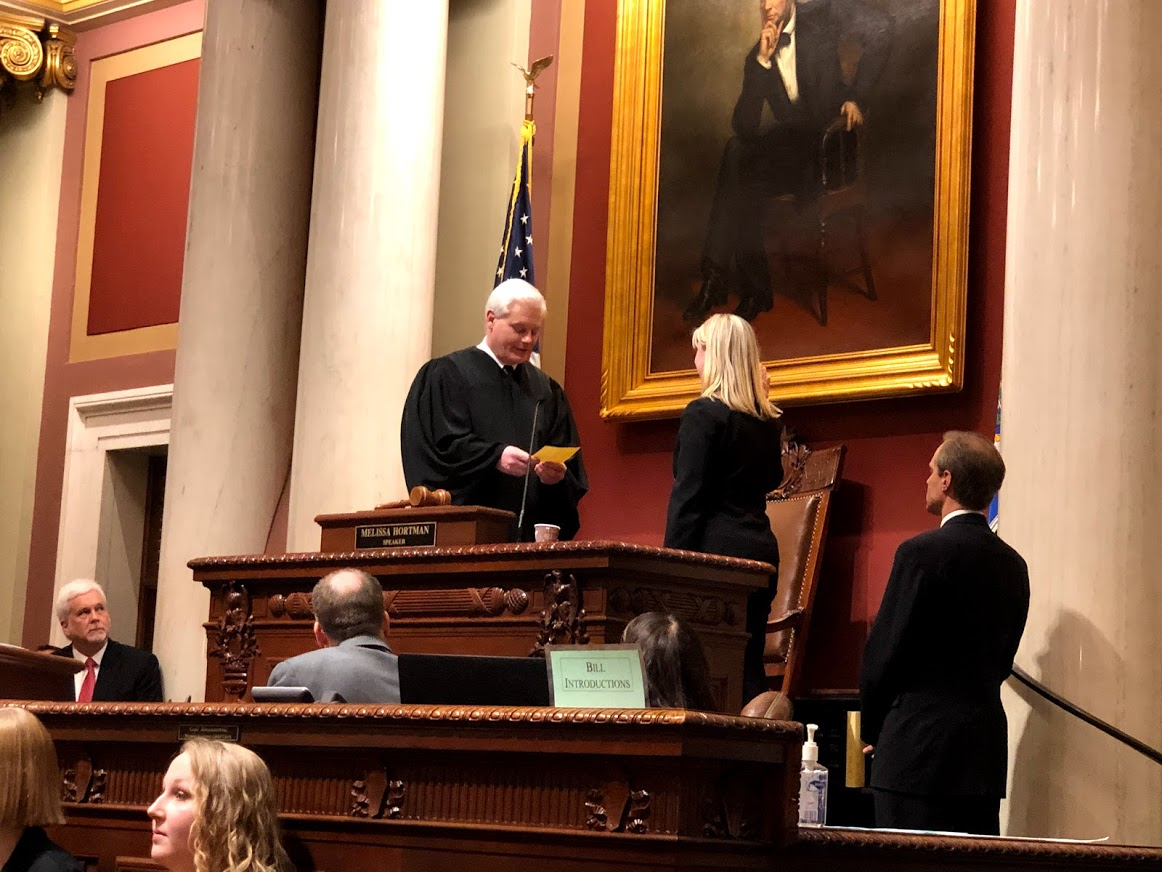
Melissa Hortman sworn in as the 61st speaker of the House by Justice Paul Thissen, January 8, 2019.

- Speaker: Melissa Hortman (DFL)
- Speakers pro tempore:
  - Gene Pelowski (DFL)
  - Paul Marquart (DFL)
  - Jeanne Poppe (DFL)
  - Liz Olson (DFL)
  - Laurie Halverson (DFL)
  - Tony Albright (R)

==== Majority (DFL) leadership ====
- Majority Leader: Ryan Winkler
- Majority Whip: Liz Olson
- Assistant Majority Leaders:
  - Jamie Becker-Finn
  - Hodan Hassan
  - Mary Kunesh-Podein
  - Fue Lee
  - Jamie Long
  - Julie Sandstede

==== Minority (Republican) leadership ====
- Minority Leader: Kurt Daudt
- Deputy Minority Leader: Anne Neu
- Minority Whip: Dan Fabian
- Assistant Minority Leaders:
  - Tony Albright
  - Peggy Bennett
  - Josh Heintzeman
  - Jon Koznick
  - Jim Nash
  - Peggy Scott

== Members ==
=== House of Representatives ===
On December 8, 2018, four Republican members of the House (Reps. Steve Drazkowski of Mazeppa, Cal Bahr of East Bethel, Tim Miller of Prinsburg, Jeremy Munson of Lake Crystal) announced that they would not join the Republican caucus in the 91st Legislature and instead would form a new caucus, called the "New Republican Caucus." They cited displeasure with "the attitudes and actions by [Leader Daudt] and some of his supporters" and said they still consider themselves to be members of the Republican Party.

=== Religious composition ===
Over half of the 91st legislature identified as Christian, 3% identified as Jewish, and 42% did not state their affiliation. The single largest religious denomination was Lutheranism with 39 members: 21 in the house (15.6%) and 18 in the senate (26.9%).

Self-reported religious affiliation
Religion	Group	No. of members	% of members
Christians	Lutherans	39 / 201	19.4%
Christians	Roman or Eastern Catholics	29 / 201	14.4%
Christians	Methodists	6 / 201	3%
Christians	Baptists	4 / 201	2%
Christians	Episcopalians	4 / 201	2%
Christians	Mormons (LDS Church)	1 / 201	0.5%
Christians	Other Christians	23 / 201	11.4%
Jews		6 / 201	3%
Muslims		2 / 201	1%
Unitarian Universalists		1 / 201	0.5%
Unknown/Refused to state		84 / 201	41.8%
Unaffiliated		0 / 201	0%

=== Minority composition ===
22 legislators identified themselves or were identified in a newspaper or book as a member of a minority group.

Self-reported minority legislators
Minority status	No. of members	% of members	% of MN
Not a minority	179	89.1	78.3
A minority	22	10.9	21.7
Hispanic	7	3.5	6.2
Hmong	6	3	1.5
Black (ex. Somali)	4	2	5.7
Somali	2	1	1.4
American Indian	2	1	1.2

== Changes in membership ==
=== Senate ===
District	Vacated by	Reason for change	Successor	Date successor seated
11	Tony Lourey (DFL)	Resigned effective on January 3, 2019, to become commissioner of human services. A special election was held on February 5, 2019.	Jason Rarick (R)	February 13, 2019
14	Jerry Relph (R)	Died due to complications from COVID-19. Relph, who had been defeated in the November general election, was replaced when the 92nd Minnesota Legislature convened.	Aric Putnam (DFL)	January 5, 2021

=== House of Representatives ===
District	Vacated by	Reason for change	Successor	Date successor seated
57A	Vacant	Hospitalized due to an infection.	Robert Bierman (DFL)	January 10, 2019
11B	Jason Rarick (R)	Resigned effective on February 12, 2019, to assume Minnesota Senate seat. A special election was held on March 19, 2019.	Nathan Nelson (R)	March 27, 2019
60A	Diane Loeffler (DFL)	Died of cancer on November 16, 2019. A special election was held on February 4, 2020.	Sydney Jordan (DFL)	February 11, 2020
30A	Nick Zerwas (R)	Resigned effective on December 6, 2019, to spend more time with his family and to seek employment outside of the Legislature. A special election was held on February 4, 2020.	Paul Novotny (R)	February 11, 2020

== Committees ==
=== Senate ===
Committee		Chair	Vice Chair	DFL Lead
Agriculture, Rural Development, and Housing Finance		Torrey Westrom	Mark Johnson	Kari Dziedzic
Agriculture, Rural Development, and Housing Policy		Bill Weber	Mike Goggin	Foung Hawj
Capital Investment		Dave Senjem	Scott Newman	Sandy Pappas
Commerce and Consumer Protection Finance and Policy		Gary Dahms	Karin Housley	Dan Sparks
E–12 Education Finance and Policy		Carla Nelson	Gary Dahms	Chuck Wiger
Energy and Utilities Finance and Policy		David Osmek	Andrew Mathews	Erik Simonson
Environment and Natural Resources Finance		Bill Ingebrigtsen	Carrie Ruud	David Tomassoni
Environment and Natural Resources Policy and Legacy Finance		Carrie Ruud	Bill Weber	Chris Eaton
Family Care and Aging		Karin Housley	Jerry Relph	Kent Eken
Finance		Julie Rosen	Bill Ingebrigtsen	Dick Cohen
Health and Human Services Finance and Policy		Michelle Benson	Scott Jensen	John Marty
Higher Education Finance and Policy		Paul Anderson	Rich Draheim	Greg Clausen
Human Services Reform Finance and Policy		Jim Abeler	Paul Utke	Jeff Hayden
Jobs and Economic Growth Finance and Policy		Eric Pratt	Justin Eichorn	Bobby Joe Champion
Judiciary and Public Safety Finance and Policy		Warren Limmer	Dan Hall	Ron Latz
Local Government		Dan Hall	Bruce Anderson	Patricia Torres Ray
Rules and Administration		Paul Gazelka	Michelle Benson	Tom Bakk
Subcommittees	Committees	Paul Gazelka		
Subcommittees	Conference Committees	Paul Gazelka		
Subcommittees	Ethical Conduct	Jeremy Miller		
Subcommittees	Litigation Expenses	Scott Newman		
Subcommittees	Permanent and Joint Rules (Note: Established January 30, 2019.)	Jeremy Miller		
State Government Finance and Policy and Elections		Mary Kiffmeyer	Mark Koran	Jim Carlson
Taxes		Roger Chamberlain	Dave Senjem	Ann Rest
Transportation Finance and Policy		Scott Newman	John Jasinski	Scott Dibble
Veterans and Military Affairs Finance and Policy		Bruce Anderson	Andrew Lang	Jerry Newton
Select Committees
Home Ownership Affordability and Availability (Note: Established May 14, 2019. Dissolved May 17, 2020.)		Rich Draheim		

=== House of Representatives ===
Committee			Chair	Vice Chair	Republican Lead
Commerce			Laurie Halverson	Zack Stephenson	Tim O'Driscoll
Education Policy			Cheryl Youakim	Mary Kunesh-Podein	Sondra Erickson
Environment and Natural Resources Policy			John Persell	Jamie Becker-Finn	Dale Lueck
Ethics			Mary Murphy		Sondra Erickson
Government Operations			Mike Freiberg	Duane Sauke	Nick Zerwas (Note: Until December 6, 2019.)
Government Operations			Mike Freiberg	Duane Sauke	Duane Quam (Note: From February 11, 2020.)
Subcommittees		Elections	Raymond Dehn	Kristin Bahner	Jim Nash
Subcommittees		Local Government	Sandra Masin	Steve Elkins	Joe McDonald
Health and Human Services Policy			Rena Moran	Kelly Morrison	Deb Kiel
Labor			Mike Sundin	Erin Koegel	Jason Rarick (Note: Until February 12, 2019.)
Labor			Mike Sundin	Erin Koegel	Bob Vogel (Note: From February 13, 2019.)
Rules and Legislative Administration			Ryan Winkler	Kaohly Her	Kurt Daudt
Subcommittee		Legislative Process Reform	Gene Pelowski		Linda Runbeck
Taxes			Paul Marquart	Dave Lislegard	Greg Davids
Division		Property and Local Tax	Diane Loeffler (Note: Until November 16, 2019.)	Samantha Vang	Jerry Hertaus
Division		Property and Local Tax	Andrew Carlson (Note: From January 10, 2020.)	Samantha Vang	Jerry Hertaus
Ways and Means			Lyndon Carlson	Liz Olson	Pat Garofalo
Divisions	Agriculture and Food Finance and Policy		Jeanne Poppe	Jeff Brand	Rod Hamilton
Divisions	Capital Investment		Mary Murphy	Fue Lee	Dean Urdahl
Divisions	Education Finance		Jim Davnie	Julie Sandstede	Ron Kresha
Divisions	Subdivision	Early Childhood Finance and Policy	Dave Pinto	Carlie Kotyza-Witthuhn	Mary Franson
Divisions	Environment and Natural Resources Finance		Rick Hansen	Anne Claflin	Dan Fabian
Divisions	Subdivision	Water	Peter Fischer	Steve Sandell	Josh Heintzeman
Divisions	Energy and Climate Finance and Policy		Jean Wagenius	Jamie Long	Chris Swedzinski
Divisions	Greater Minnesota Jobs and Economic Development Finance		Gene Pelowski	Ben Lien	Paul Anderson
Divisions	Health and Human Services Finance		Tina Liebling	Alice Mann	Joe Schomacker
Divisions	Subdivisions	Early Childhood Finance and Policy	Dave Pinto	Carlie Kotyza-Witthuhn	Mary Franson
Divisions	Subdivisions	Long-Term Care	Jennifer Schultz	Todd Lippert	Glenn Gruenhagen
Divisions	Higher Education Finance and Policy		Connie Bernardy	Laurie Pryor	Bud Nornes
Divisions	Housing Finance and Policy		Alice Hausman	Michael Howard	Tama Theis
Divisions	Jobs and Economic Development Finance		Tim Mahoney	Mohamud Noor	Bob Gunther
Divisions	Judiciary Finance and Civil Law		John Lesch	Kelly Moller	Peggy Scott
Divisions	Legacy Finance		Leon Lillie	Ami Wazlawik	Josh Heintzeman
Divisions	Public Safety and Criminal Justice Reform Finance and Policy		Carlos Mariani	Heather Edelson	Brian Johnson
Divisions	Subdivision	Corrections	Jack Considine	Dan Wolgamott	Marion O'Neill
Divisions	State Government Finance		Mike Nelson	Andrew Carlson (Note: Until February 11, 2020.)	Tony Albright
Divisions	State Government Finance		Mike Nelson	Ginny Klevorn (Note: From February 11, 2020.)	Tony Albright
Divisions	Transportation Finance and Policy		Frank Hornstein	Brad Tabke	Paul Torkelson
Divisions	Veterans and Military Affairs Finance and Policy		Rob Ecklund	Jay Xiong	Bob Dettmer
Select Committees
Minnesota's Pandemic Response and Rebuilding (Note: Established May 12, 2020.)			Melissa Hortman	Ryan Winkler	

== Administrative officers ==
=== Senate ===
- Secretary: Cal Ludeman
- First Assistant Secretary: Colleen Pacheco
- Second Assistant Secretary: Mike Linn
- Engrossing Secretary: Melissa Mapes
- Sergeant at Arms: Sven Lindquist
- Assistant Sergeant at Arms: Marilyn Logan
- Chaplain: Mike Smith

=== House of Representatives ===
- Chief Clerk: Patrick Murphy
- First Assistant Chief Clerk: Tim Johnson
- Second Assistant Chief Clerk: Gail Romanowski
- Chief Sergeant at Arms: Bob Meyerson
- Assistant Sergeant at Arms: Erica Brynildson
- Assistant Sergeant at Arms: Andrew Olson
- Index Clerk: Carl Hamre
