= Same-sex marriage in Minnesota =

Same-sex marriage has been fully recognized in Minnesota since August 1, 2013. Same-sex marriages have been recognized if performed in other jurisdictions since July 1, 2013, and the state began issuing marriage licenses to same-sex couples on August 1. After 51.19% of state voters rejected a constitutional amendment to ban same-sex marriage in November 2012, the Minnesota Legislature passed a same-sex marriage bill in May 2013, which Governor Mark Dayton signed on May 14. Minnesota was the second state in the Midwest, after Iowa, to legalize marriage between same-sex couples, and the first in the region to do so by enacting legislation rather than by court order. Minnesota was the first state to reject a constitutional amendment banning same-sex marriage, though Arizona rejected one in 2006 that banned all legal recognition and later approved one banning only marriage.

Minnesota is also where one of the first same-sex marriage cases in the world took place. In Baker v. Nelson, the Minnesota Supreme Court held unanimously in 1972 that it did not violate the U.S. Constitution to limit marriage to opposite-sex couples, and the U.S. Supreme Court refused to hear the case on appeal. This decision would be repealed on June 26, 2015, in the case of Obergefell v. Hodges.

== Same-sex marriage ==
=== Background ===
Baker v. Nelson was the first case in the history of the United States in which a same-sex couple sued for marriage rights. In late 1971, the Minnesota Supreme Court affirmed a lower court decision to prohibit marriages between same-sex partners, noting that its interpretation of state law did not violate the Constitution of the United States. The U.S. Supreme Court accepted their appeal but declined to review the case. On October 10, 1972, a one-sentence order said, "The appeal is dismissed for want of a substantial federal question." In early 1971, the couple in question, Michael McConnell and Jack Baker, re-applied in Blue Earth County and obtained a marriage license. Baker's name change to Pat Lyn may have encouraged county officials to assume they were a heterosexual couple. Reverend Roger Lynn, a minister from the Hennepin Avenue United Methodist Church, conducted the ceremony at a private home. Because the license was never revoked, their wedding became the earliest same-sex marriage ever to be recorded in the public files of any civil government.

Responding to the Supreme Court ruling, delegates at the Minnesota Democratic–Farmer–Labor Party (DFL) State Convention in June 1972 voted to add a plank to the party platform supporting same-sex marriage rights. This is the first known case of support by a major United States political party for same-sex marriage, though it is worth noting that many DFL state representatives disassociated themselves from the plank and the DFL party rules subsequently changed to make amendments to the party platform much harder to achieve for future conventions.

In May 2010, Marry Me Minnesota, a gay rights organization, sued the state of Minnesota, challenging the state's Defense of Marriage Act, which was passed in 1997. The trial court dismissed the suit in March 2011, citing Baker v. Nelson as "binding precedent". Marry Me Minnesota, founded by same-sex couples for the purpose of suing the state, announced plans to appeal the decision.

=== Attempts to pass constitutional ban ===
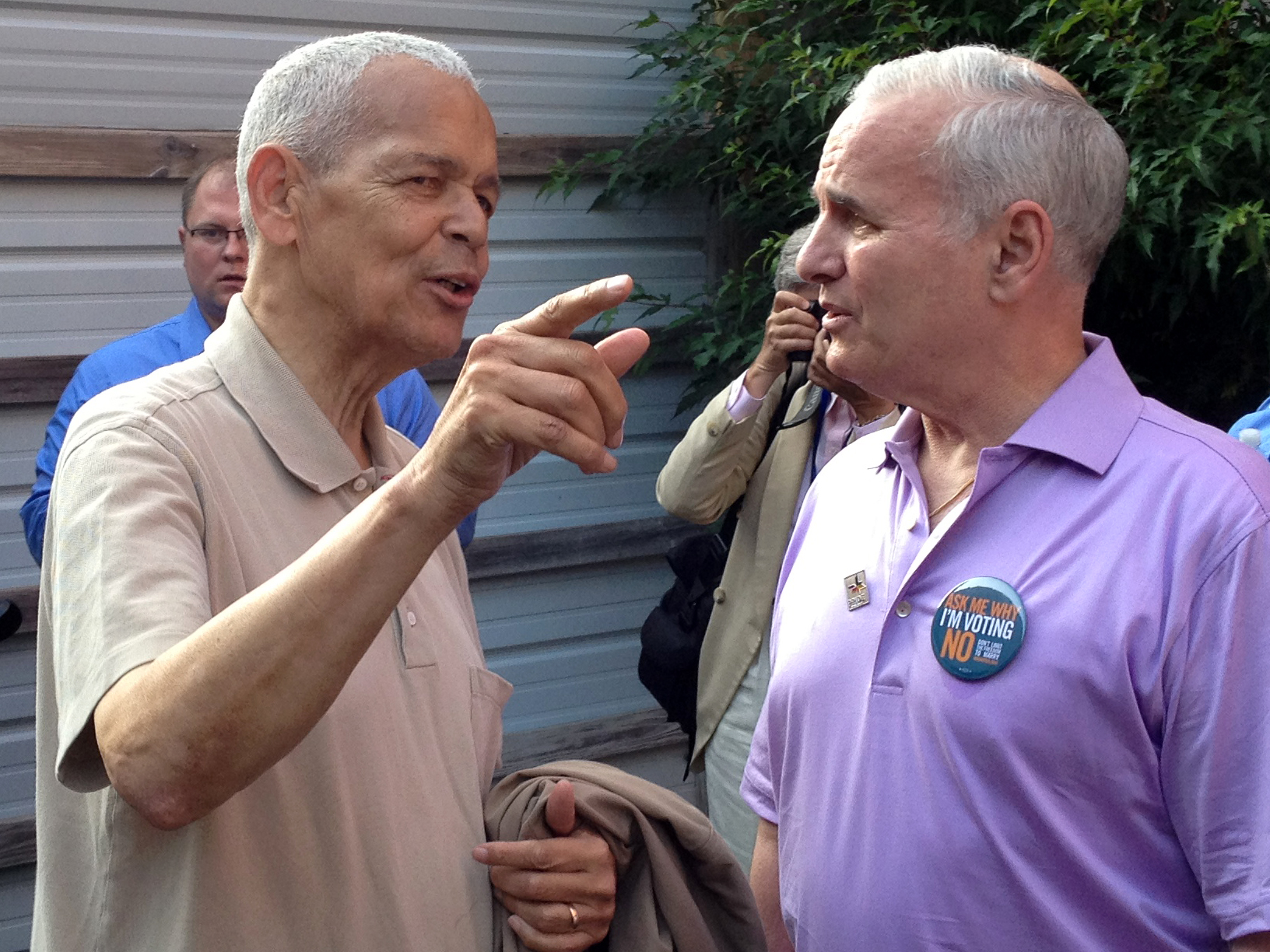
Julian Bond and Governor Mark Dayton at a "Vote No" rally against Minnesota Amendment 1 in June 2012

In 2004, 2006, 2007 and 2009, bills were introduced to the Minnesota House of Representatives and Senate to have voters consider an amendment to the Minnesota Constitution, restricting marriage to unions between "a man and a woman" and outlawing civil unions that offer comparable rights. On May 11, 2011, the Minnesota Senate passed a bill by 37 votes to 27 to place a proposed amendment to the State Constitution on the ballot that would ban same-sex marriage, though not civil unions. It passed the House ten days later 70–62. The question presented to voters on the ballot on November 8, 2012 read: "Shall the Minnesota Constitution be amended to provide that only a union of one man and one woman shall be valid or recognized as a marriage in Minnesota?" The amendment was defeated by voters, making Minnesota the first U.S. state to reject a constitutional ban on same-sex marriage. Arizona rejected a ban on same-sex marriages and civil unions in 2006 but then adopted a ban on only same-sex marriages in 2008. Minnesota's constitutional amendment proposal was rejected by 51.9% of voters.

The amendment was opposed by the grassroot organization Minnesotans United for All Families. President Barack Obama also expressed his opposition to the amendment, as did Minnesota Vikings football player Chris Kluwe, who featured in numerous advertisements opposing the amendment. The main organization to support the amendment was Minnesota for Marriage, which was supported by the state's Roman Catholic bishops.

=== Passage of legislation in 2013 ===
Same-sex marriage in the United States

In 1997, the Minnesota Legislature passed a statutory ban on same-sex marriage, shortly after passage of the federal Defense of Marriage Act (DOMA) in the United States Congress.

In late 2008, Senator John Marty, announced plans to introduce a bill legalizing same-sex marriage. On February 19, 2009, a bill to allow civil unions was introduced to the Minnesota House of Representatives, and sponsored by representatives Joe Mullery, Mindy Greiling, and Tom Tillberry. A same-sex marriage bill was introduced to the Minnesota Senate on March 5, 2009. Its authors were senators Scott Dibble, Linda Higgins, John Marty, Mee Moua, and Patricia Torres Ray. The bill failed to get a hearing by the Senate Judiciary Committee.

In December 2012, Representative Alice Hausman and Senator Marty announced plans to introduce same-sex marriage legislation in 2013. They and legislative leaders expressed varying views on its prospects. In January 2013, Senator Dibble said Democrats planned to focus early in the session on "kitchen-table issues" of improving the economy and creating jobs and would wait at least a month or two before pressing for the legalization of same-sex marriage. On February 28, 2013, HF 1054, officially titled Marriage between two persons provided for, and exemptions and protections based in religious associations provided for, was introduced in the Minnesota Legislature to legalize same-sex marriage in the state. On March 12, both the Senate and House policy committees passed the same version of the marriage bill, Senate Bill SF925 and House Bill HF1054. Other committees of each chamber reviewed the financial impact of the legislation on 6 and 7 May. On May 9, 2013, the House passed the legislation by a vote of 75–59, with all but two Democrats voting for the bill and all but four Republicans voting against. On May 13, 2013, the Senate passed the bill on a vote of 37–30, with all but three Democrats voting for the bill and all but one Republican voting against. Governor Mark Dayton signed the bill into law on May 14, 2013 on the south steps of the Minnesota State Capitol before a crowd of 6,000 people. Under the provisions of the legislation, the first same-sex marriage were likely to take place on August 1, 2013. The legislation also gives Minnesota courts authority over divorce proceedings in the case of a same-sex couple married in Minnesota when neither party resides in a state that recognizes their marriage. Some Minnesota counties announced plans to make marriage licenses available as early as June 6.

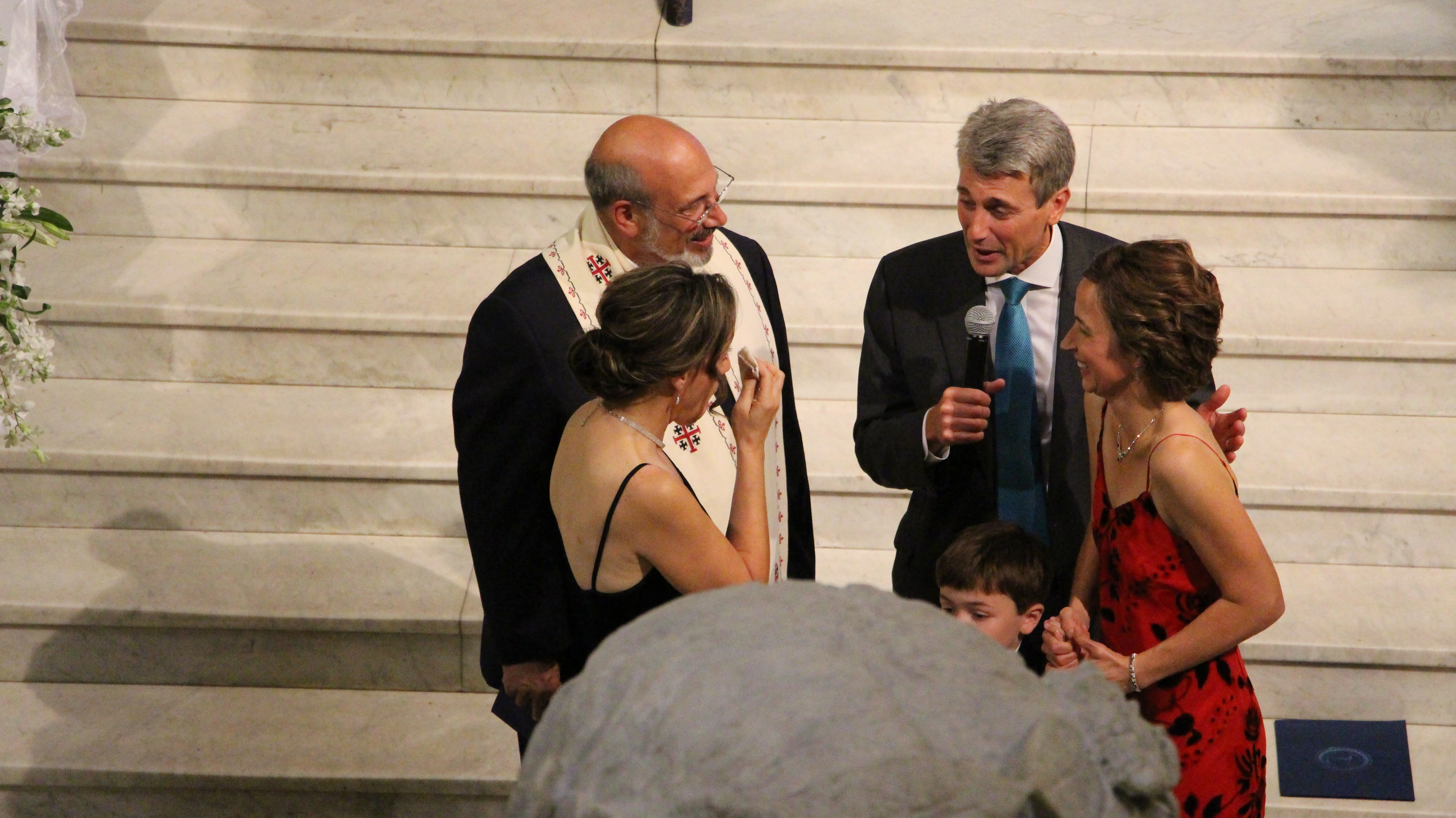
The first same-sex marriage performed following passage of the revised marriage statute, Minneapolis, August 1, 2013

Rally for same-sex marriage at the Minnesota State Capitol, May 13, 2013

May 9, 2013 vote in the House of Representatives
Political affiliation	Voted for	Voted against	Absent (Did not vote)
Democratic–Farmer–Labor Party	71: Susan Allen; Tom Anzelc; Joe Atkins; John Benson; Connie Bernardy; David Bly; Kathy Brynaert; Lyndon Carlson; Karen Clark; Jim Davnie; Raymond Dehn; David Dill; Zach Dorholt; Ron Erhardt; Roger Erickson; Andrew Falk; Tim Faust; Peter Fischer; Mike Freiberg; Laurie Halverson; Rick Hansen; Alice Hausman; Debra Hilstrom; Frank Hornstein; Melissa Hortman; Tom Huntley; Jason Isaacson; Clark Johnson; Sheldon Johnson; Phyllis Kahn; Carolyn Laine; Ann Lenczewski; John Lesch; Tina Liebling; Ben Lien; Leon Lillie; Diane Loeffler; Tim Mahoney; Carlos Mariani; Paul Marquart; Sandra Masin; Jay McNamar; Carly Melin; Jason Metsa; Rena Moran; Will Morgan; Joe Mullery; Erin Murphy; Mary Murphy; Mike Nelson; Jerry Newton; Kim Norton; Michael Paymar; Gene Pelowski; John Persell; Jeanne Poppe; Joe Radinovich; Paul Rosenthal; Shannon Savick; Dan Schoen; Yvonne Selcer; Steve Simon; Erik Simonson; Linda Slocum; Mike Sundin; Paul Thissen; Jean Wagenius; JoAnn Ward; John Ward; Ryan Winkler; Barb Yarusso	2: Patti Fritz; Mary Sawatzky	–
Republican Party	4: David FitzSimmons; Pat Garofalo; Andrea Kieffer; Jenifer Loon	57: Jim Abeler; Tony Albright; Mark Anderson; Paul Anderson; Sarah Anderson; Bob Barrett; Mike Beard; Mike Benson; Tony Cornish; Kurt Daudt; Greg Davids; Matt Dean; Bob Dettmer; Steve Drazkowski; Sondra Erickson; Dan Fabian; Mary Franson; Steve Green; Glenn Gruenhagen; Bob Gunther; Tom Hackbarth; Rod Hamilton; Jerry Hertaus; Mary Liz Holberg; Joe Hoppe; Jeff Howe; Brian Johnson; Tim Kelly; Deb Kiel; Ron Kresha; Ernie Leidiger; Kathy Lohmer; Tara Mack; Joe McDonald; Denny McNamara; Pam Myhra; Jim Newberger; Bud Nornes; Tim O'Driscoll; Marion O'Neill; Joyce Peppin; John Petersburg; Cindy Pugh; Duane Quam; Linda Runbeck; Tim Sanders; Joe Schomacker; Peggy Scott; Chris Swedzinski; Tama Theis; Paul Torkelson; Mark Uglem; Dean Urdahl; Anna Wills; Kelby Woodard; Kurt Zellers; Nick Zerwas	–
Total	75	59	0
Total	56.0%	44.0%	0.0%

May 13, 2013 vote in the Senate
Political affiliation	Voted for	Voted against	Absent (Did not vote)
Democratic–Farmer–Labor Party	36: Tom Bakk; Terri Bonoff; Jim Carlson; Bobby Joe Champion; Greg Clausen; Dick Cohen; Kevin Dahle; Scott Dibble; Kari Dziedzic; Chris Eaton; Kent Eken; Melisa López Franzen; Barb Goodwin; Foung Hawj; Jeff Hayden; John Hoffman; Vicki Jensen; Alice Johnson; Susan Kent; Ron Latz; Tony Lourey; John Marty; Jim Metzen; Sandy Pappas; Roger Reinert; Ann Rest; Tom Saxhaug; Bev Scalze; Matt Schmit; Kathy Sheran; Katie Sieben; Rod Skoe; David Tomassoni; Patricia Torres Ray; Chuck Wiger; Melissa Wiklund	3: Lyle Koenen; Dan Sparks; LeRoy Stumpf	–
Republican Party	1: Branden Petersen	27: Bruce Anderson; Michelle Benson; Dave Brown; Roger Chamberlain; Gary Dahms; Michelle Fischbach; Paul Gazelka; Dan Hall; David Hann; Karin Housley; Bill Ingebrigtsen; Mary Kiffmeyer; Warren Limmer; Jeremy Miller; Carla Nelson; Scott Newman; Sean Nienow; Julianne Ortman; David Osmek; John Pederson; Eric Pratt; Julie Rosen; Carrie Ruud; Dave Senjem; Dave Thompson; Bill Weber; Torrey Westrom	–
Total	37	30	0
Total	55.2%	44.8%	0.0%

The law took effect on July 1, 2013, and Minnesota has recognized the validity of same-sex marriages from other jurisdictions since then. The state began issuing its own marriage licenses to same-sex couples on August 1, 2013. Margaret Miles and Cathy ten Broeke were the first couple to be married in Minneapolis at midnight on August 1, in a ceremony officiated by Mayor R. T. Rybak at Minneapolis City Hall. The definition of marriage in the state of Minnesota is now the following:

A civil marriage, so far as its validity in law is concerned, is a civil contract between two persons, to which the consent of the parties, capable in law of contracting, is essential. [Minn. Stat. § 517.001]

=== Native American nations ===
The Indian Civil Rights Act primarily aims to protect the rights of Native Americans but also reinforces the principle of tribal self-governance. While it does not grant sovereignty, the Act affirms the authority of tribes to govern their own legal affairs. Consequently, many tribes have enacted their own marriage and family laws. As a result, the 2013 state law and the Supreme Court's Obergefell v. Hodges ruling did not automatically apply to tribal jurisdictions. Same-sex marriage is legal on the reservations of the Fond du Lac Band of Lake Superior Chippewa, the Grand Portage Band of Chippewa, and the Leech Lake Band of Ojibwe, three Ojibwe tribes forming part of the Minnesota Chippewa Tribe, as well as the Prairie Island Indian Community, a Dakota tribe. The Prairie Island Indian Community Domestic Relations Ordinance (Dakota: Tinta Winta Tiwahe Woope), enacted in October 2022, states that "[t]wo persons of the same or opposite gender may marry". The first same-sex marriage on the Leech Lake Indian Reservation was performed on November 15, 2013 for Arnold and Matthew Dahl-Wooley. The Family Relations Code (Ojibwe: Gidinawemaaganinaan Onaakonigewin) of the Leech Lake Band states that marriage is "a personal relationship arising out of a civil contract requiring the consent of the parties or their guardians".

Native Americans have deep-rooted marriage traditions, placing a strong emphasis on community, family and spiritual connections. While there are no records of same-sex marriages being performed in Native American cultures in the way they are commonly defined in Western legal systems, many Indigenous communities recognize identities and relationships that may be placed on the LGBT spectrum. Among these are two-spirit individuals—people who embody both masculine and feminine qualities. In some cultures, two-spirit individuals assigned male at birth wear women's clothing and engage in household and artistic work associated with the feminine sphere. Historically, this identity sometimes allowed for unions between two people of the same biological sex. The Ojibwe refer to two-spirit people as niizh manidoowag (pronounced [niːʒ maˈnɪˌdoːˌwak]), a term that inspired the modern umbrella term "two-spirit". Many niizh manidoowag were wives in polygynous households. They are known as wiŋkta (pronounced [ˈwĩkta]) in the Dakota language. Many wiŋkta married cisgender men without indication of polygyny, but some remained unmarried and lived in their own tipis, and were visited by married men for sexual intercourse when the men's wives were pregnant or menstruating, and therefore when sexual intercourse was forbidden to them.

=== Economic impact ===
The Williams Institute estimated in April 2013 that if marriage were extended to same-sex couples in Minnesota, the state would see an economic boost of $42 million over the course of three years, with a boost of $27 million in the first year alone. This net impact would be the result of savings in expenditures on state means-tested public benefit programs and an increase in state income and sales tax revenue.

=== Demographics and marriage statistics ===
Approximately 1,640 same-sex couples married in Minnesota from August to September 2013, representing about one-third of all marriages performed during that time. 75% of same-sex marriage licenses were issued in Hennepin and Ramsey counties. Approximately 1,433 marriage licenses were issued to same-sex couples in the twelve counties that rejected Minnesota Amendment 1 in 2012. Of the counties that favored the amendment, Clay County issued the most licenses at 31.

The Minnesota State Demographer's office estimated that there were 8,594 married same-sex couple households in the state in July 2016. The 2020 U.S. census showed that there were 10,049 married same-sex couple households (4,240 male couples and 5,809 female couples) and 7,808 unmarried same-sex couple households in Minnesota.

== Domestic partnerships ==
Eighteen cities in Minnesota, covering a total population of more than one million, have domestic partnership registries allowing unmarried same-sex and opposite-sex couples the right to obtain a certificate signifying that they are not related by blood and are committed to each other. Minneapolis was the first city to establish a domestic partnership registry in the state in 1991, followed by Duluth (2009), St. Paul (2009), Edina (2010), Rochester (2010), Maplewood (2010), Golden Valley (2010), St. Louis Park (2011), Red Wing (2011), Richfield (2011), Shoreview (2011), Robbinsdale (2011), Falcon Heights (2011), Hopkins (2011), Shorewood (2011), Crystal (2011), Eagan (2012), and Eden Prairie (2012).

== Public opinion ==
Public opinion for same-sex marriage in Minnesota
Poll source	Dates administered	Sample size	Margin of error	Support	Opposition	Do not know / refused
Public Religion Research Institute	February 28 – December 8, 2025	555 adults	?	74%	21%	5%
Public Religion Research Institute	March 13 – December 2, 2024	431 adults	?	72%	24%	4%
Public Religion Research Institute	March 9 – December 7, 2023	450 adults	?	73%	24%	3%
Public Religion Research Institute	March 11 – December 14, 2022	?	?	77%	21%	2%
Public Religion Research Institute	March 8 – November 9, 2021	?	?	82%	17%	1%
Public Religion Research Institute	January 7 – December 20, 2020	886 adults	?	78%	19%	3%
Public Religion Research Institute	April 5 – December 23, 2017	1,412 adults	?	67%	27%	6%
Public Religion Research Institute	May 18, 2016 – January 10, 2017	2,060 adults	?	63%	27%	10%
Public Religion Research Institute	April 29, 2015 – January 7, 2016	1,496 adults	?	57%	37%	6%
Public Religion Research Institute	April 2, 2014 – January 4, 2015	1,035 adults	?	58%	33%	9%
Edison Research	November 4, 2014	?	?	58%	39%	3%
New York Times/CBS News/YouGov	September 20 – October 1, 2014	2,562 likely voters	± 2.2%	52%	34%	14%
Star Tribune Minnesota	June 11–13, 2013	800 adults	± 3.5%	46%	44%	10%
SurveyUSA	April 19–21, 2013	500 adults	± 4.5%	51%	47%	2%
Public Policy Polling	January 18–20, 2013	1,065 voters	± 3.0%	47%	45%	8%
Public Policy Polling	November 2–3, 2012	1,164 likely voters	± 2.9%	49%	41%	10%
Public Policy Polling	October 5–8, 2012	937 likely voters	± 3.2%	47%	43%	10%
Public Policy Polling	September 10–11, 2012	824 likely voters	± 3.4%	43%	46%	11%
Public Policy Polling	May 31 – June 3, 2012	973 voters	± 3.1%	47%	42%	11%
Public Policy Polling	January 21–22, 2012	1,236 voters	± 2.8%	43%	47%	10%
Public Policy Polling	May 27–30, 2011	1,179 voters	± 2.9%	46%	45%	9%

== See also ==
- LGBT rights in Minnesota
- Same-sex marriage in the United States
