= Jordan Rasmusson =

American politician

Minority Leader of the Minnesota Senate
- Assuming office January 12, 2027
- Succeeding: Mark Johnson

Member of the Minnesota Senate from the 9th district
- Incumbent
- Assumed office January 3, 2023
- Preceded by: Paul Gazelka

Member of the Minnesota House of Representatives from the 8A district
- In office January 6, 2021 – January 3, 2023
- Preceded by: Bud Nornes
- Succeeded by: Liz Olson

Personal details
- Born: April 23, 1993 (age 33)
- Party: Republican
- Education: Harvard University (AB)
- Occupation: Consultant

Jordan Rasmusson (born April 23, 1993) is an American politician serving as a member of the Minnesota Senate from the 9th district. He previously served in the Minnesota House of Representatives from the 8A district. Elected in November 2020, he assumed office on January 6, 2021. Beginning in 2027, he will be the Senate Minority Leader.

== Education ==
After graduating Fergus Falls High School in 2011 from Fergus Falls, Minnesota, Rasmusson attended college in the US to earn a Bachelor of Arts degree in government from Harvard University in 2015.

== Career ==
Rasmusson worked as a management consultant for 2 years at McKinsey & Company. He later worked as an investment professional for 2 years at Bain Capital before establishing the Rasmusson Group (business registration unknown), a business and investment management firm. Rasmusson was elected to the Minnesota House of Representatives in November 2020 and assumed office on January 6, 2021. He was first elected to the Minnesota Senate in 2022, and reelected in 2024 and 2026.

Rasmusson will serve as Senate Minority Leader in 2027.

== Personal life ==
Rasmusson is a Lutheran.
