= Minnesota Senate Republican Caucus =

- Leader: Mark Johnson
- Deputy Leader: Michelle Benson
- Ideology: Conservatism
- State party: Republican Party of Minnesota
- Senators: 32 / 67

Website
- www.mnsenaterepublicans.com

The Minnesota Senate Republican Caucus is the formal organization of the Republican members of the Minnesota Senate. With 33 members, the current minority leader is Senator Mark Johnson.

== List of caucus leaders ==
The Republicans have held a majority in the Senate after just two elections since party organization resumed in 1973. The list of caucus leaders is as follows:

Minnesota Senate Republican leaders, 1973–present
Senator	Start	End
Harold Krieger	January 2, 1973	January 1, 1975
Robert Ashbach	January 2, 1975	January 3, 1983
James Ulland	January 4, 1983	January 9, 1985
Glen Taylor	January 9, 1985	January 5, 1987
Duane Benson	January 6, 1987	January 4, 1993
Dean Johnson	January 5, 1993	July 9, 1997
Dick Day	July 9, 1997	January 2, 2007
David Senjem	January 3, 2007	January 3, 2011
Amy Koch	January 4, 2011	December 15, 2011
David Senjem	December 27, 2011	January 7, 2013
David Hann	January 8, 2013	January 2, 2017
Paul Gazelka	January 3, 2017	September 1, 2021
Jeremy Miller	September 9, 2021	January 3, 2023
Mark Johnson	January 3, 2023	present
