= Kristi Pursell =

American politician (born 1981)

- Pursell in 2026

Member of the Minnesota House of Representatives from the 58A district
- Incumbent
- Assumed office January 3, 2023
- Preceded by: Todd Lippert

Personal details
- Born: February 13, 1981 (age 45) Rochester, Minnesota, U.S.
- Party: Democratic (DFL)
- Spouse: Michael
- Children: 2
- Education: St. Olaf College (BA); University of Minnesota, Duluth
- Occupation: Non-profit executive director; Legislator
- Website: Government website Campaign website

Kristi Achor Pursell (born February 9, 1981) is an American politician serving in the Minnesota House of Representatives since 2023. A member of the Minnesota Democratic–Farmer–Labor Party (DFL), Pursell represents District 58A in southern Minnesota, which includes the city of Northfield and parts of Dakota, Rice, and Scott Counties.

== Early life, education and career ==
Pursell was born in Rochester, Minnesota, and graduated from St. Olaf College with a bachelor's degree in English and environmental studies. She also received a graduate certificate in environmental education from the University of Minnesota Duluth.

Pursell served five years as the executive director of Clean River Partners, an environmental nonprofit organization based in Northfield. She has also been a leader in grassroots organizations, including the Land Stewardship Project, ISAIAH MN, and TakeAction MN. She worked as executive director of the Cannon River Watershed Partnership.

== Minnesota House of Representatives ==
Pursell was first elected to the Minnesota House of Representatives in 2022. She ran for an open seat created by legislative redistricting and the retirement of one-term DFL incumbent Todd Lippert.

Pursell serves as vice-chair of the Agriculture Finance and Policy Committee and sits on the Elections Finance and Policy, Environment and Natural Resources Finance and Policy, and Education Finance Committees.

=== Political positions ===
Pursell authored a bill that would restore a citizens' oversight board to the Minnesota Pollution Control Agency that would be able to approve or deny agency policy. The previous board was eliminated in an end-of-session deal in 2015. According to Pursell, she introduced the bill, which ran into opposition from rural legislators, because "I've heard from many Minnesotans who feel like the MPCA treats industry as its clients rather than centering people and our natural environment".

In 2023, Pursell authored bipartisan legislation that would fund rural broadband infrastructure across the state. In final negotiations, DFL leadership announced $100 million in rural broadband spending, which Pursell called "the largest commitment the state has made to date for broadband".

== Electoral history ==
2022 Minnesota State House - District 58A
Party	Candidate	Votes	%
Democratic (DFL)	Kristi Pursell	11,362	54.48
Republican	Gary Bruggenthies	9,481	45.46
Write-in		13	0.06
Total votes		20,856	100.0
Democratic (DFL) hold			

2024 Minnesota State House - District 58A
Party	Candidate	Votes	%
Republican	Rita Hillmann Olson	12,067	47.48
Democratic (DFL)	Kristi Pursell (incumbent)	13,325	52.43
Write-in		22	0.09
Total votes		25,414	100.00
Democratic (DFL) hold			

== Personal life ==
Pursell lives in Northfield, Minnesota, with her husband, Michael, and has two children.
