= Dave Pinto =

American politician

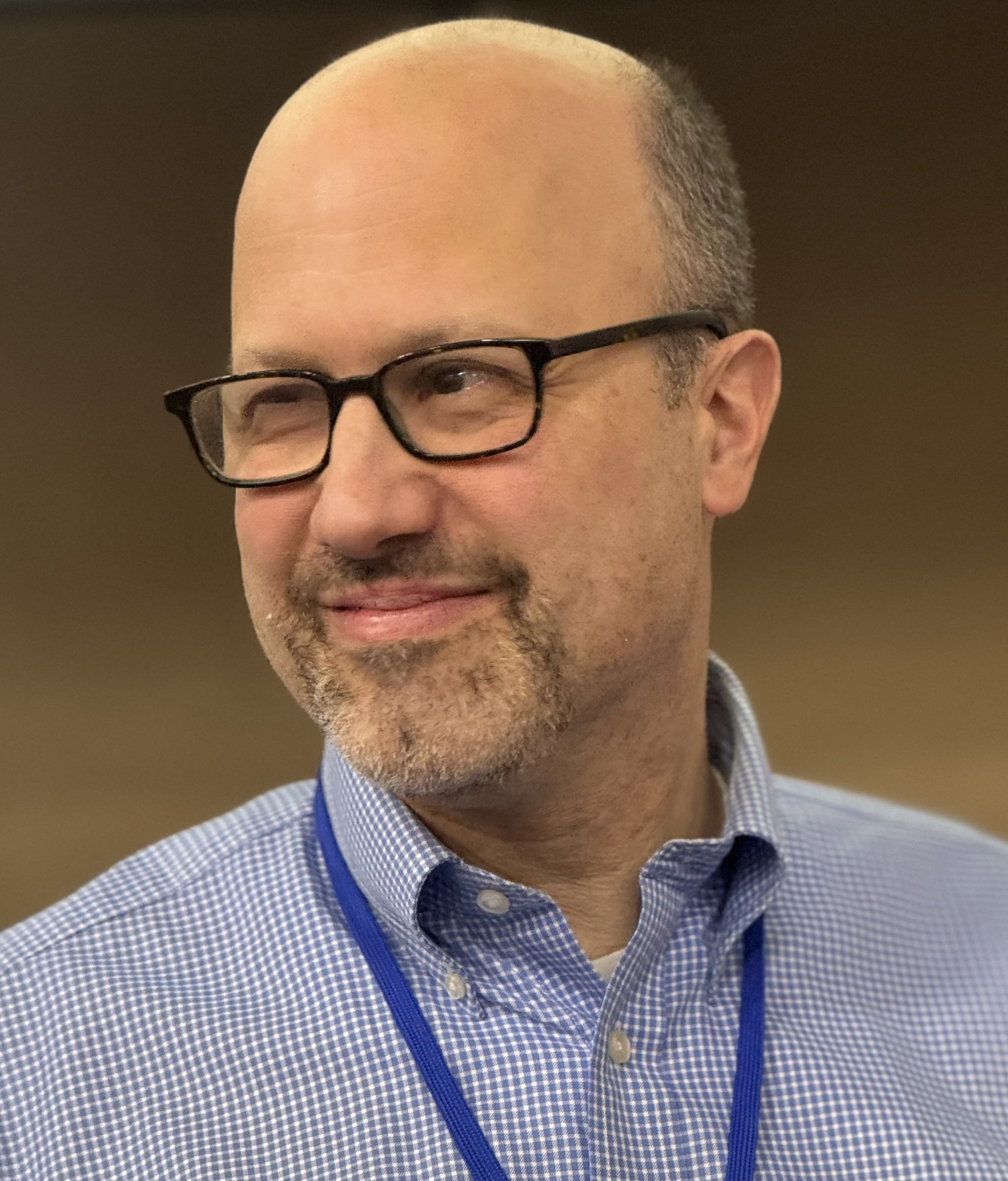

Member of the Minnesota House of Representatives from the 64B district
- Incumbent
- Assumed office January 6, 2015
- Preceded by: Michael Paymar

Personal details
- Born: April 12, 1972 (age 54)
- Party: Minnesota Democratic–Farmer–Labor Party
- Spouse: Abby
- Children: 2
- Education: Harvard University (B.A.); University of Virginia (M.B.A., J.D.)
- Occupation: Prosecutor

Dave Pinto (/ˈpɪntoʊ/ PIN-toh; born April 12, 1972) is an American politician serving in the Minnesota House of Representatives since 2015. A member of the Minnesota Democratic–Farmer–Labor Party (DFL), Pinto represents District 64B, which includes parts of Saint Paul in Ramsey County, Minnesota.

== Early life, education and career ==
Pinto grew up in Falcon Heights, Minnesota. He attended Harvard University, graduating with a bachelor's degree, and the University of Virginia, graduating with a M.B.A. and J.D.

Pinto worked as a clerk for Judge Diana E. Murphy in the 8th Circuit Court of Appeals, and in the office of U.S. Representative Bruce Vento. Pinto is an assistant attorney for Ramsey County.

== Minnesota House of Representatives ==
Pinto was first elected to the Minnesota House of Representatives in 2014, after the retirement of DFL incumbent Michael Paymar, and has been reelected every two years since.

Pinto served as an assistant minority leader from 2017-18. From 2019-2021, Pinto served as chair of the Early Childhood Finance and Policy Committee. Since 2023, Pinto has chaired the Children and Families Finance and Policy Committee, and sits on the Public Safety Finance and Policy, Taxes, and Ways and Means Committees.

== Electoral history ==
2014 Minnesota State House - District 64B
Party	Candidate	Votes	%
Democratic (DFL)	Dave Pinto	13,356	73.49
Republican	Daniel Surman	4,771	26.25
Write-in		47	0.26
Total votes		18,174	100.0
Democratic (DFL) hold			

2016 Minnesota State House - District 64B
Party	Candidate	Votes	%
Democratic (DFL)	Dave Pinto (incumbent)	18,242	74.77
Republican	Emory K. Dively	6,103	25.02
Write-in		52	0.21
Total votes		24,397	100.0
Democratic (DFL) hold			

2018 Minnesota State House - District 64B
Party	Candidate	Votes	%
Democratic (DFL)	Dave Pinto (incumbent)	19,447	80.07
Republican	Alex Pouliot	4,812	19.81
Write-in		29	0.12
Total votes		24,288	100.0
Democratic (DFL) hold			

2020 Minnesota State House - District 64B
Party	Candidate	Votes	%
Democratic (DFL)	Dave Pinto (incumbent)	20,995	80.38
Republican	Georgia Dietz	5,084	19.46
Write-in		42	0.16
Total votes		26,121	100.0
Democratic (DFL) hold			

2022 Minnesota State House - District 64B
Party	Candidate	Votes	%
Democratic (DFL)	Dave Pinto (incumbent)	18,126	82.59
Republican	Lorraine Englund	3,790	17.27
Write-in		31	0.14
Total votes		21,947	100.0
Democratic (DFL) hold			

2024 Minnesota State House - District 64B
Party	Candidate	Votes	%
Democratic (DFL)	Dave Pinto (incumbent)	20,922	80.10
Republican	Peter Donahue	5,152	19.72
Write-in		47	0.18
Total votes		26,121	100.00
Democratic (DFL) hold			

== Personal life ==
Pinto is married to his wife, Abby. They have two children and reside in St. Paul.
