= Melisa López Franzen =

American politician

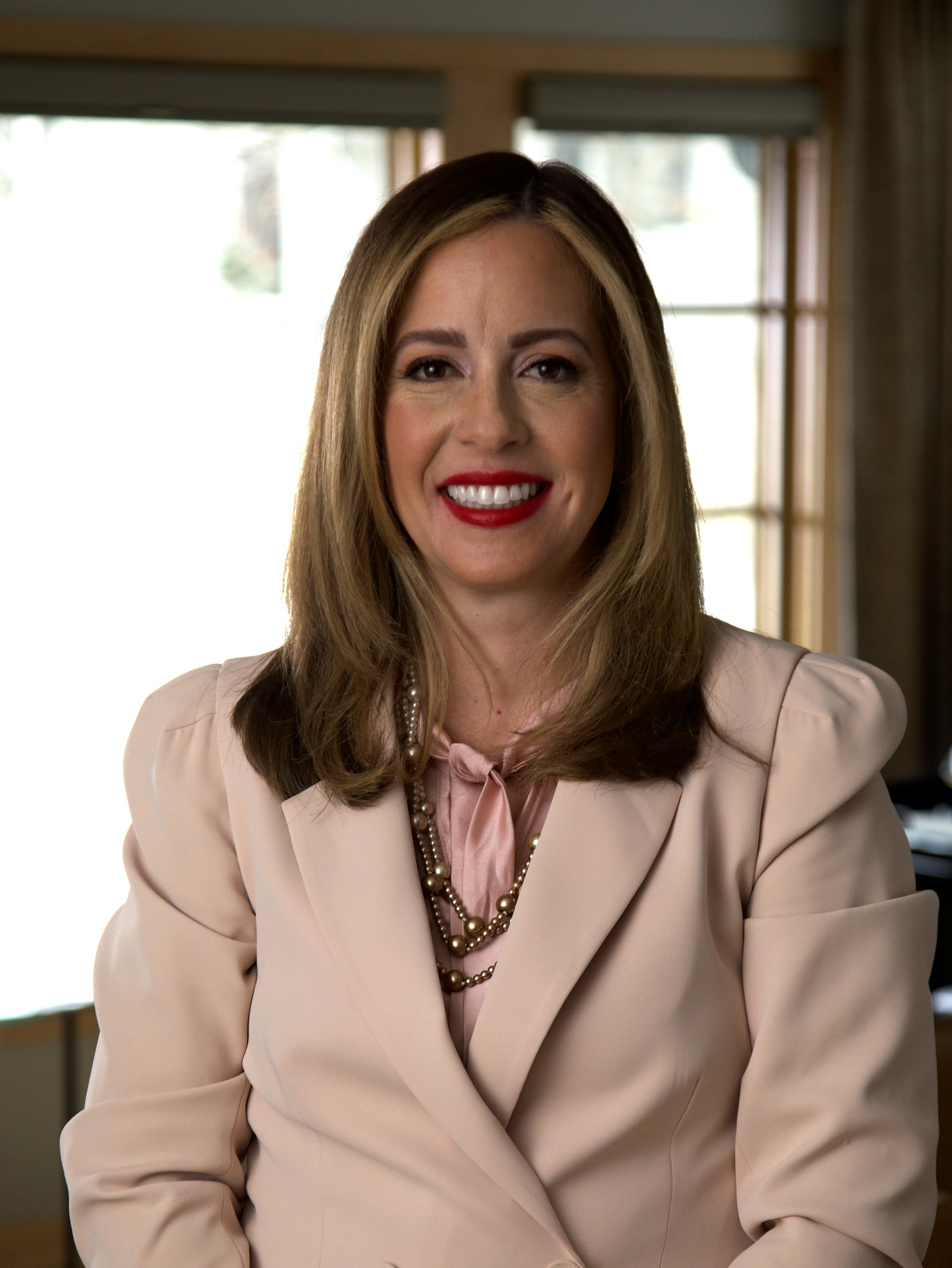
- López Franzen in 2025

Minority Leader of the Minnesota Senate
- In office September 14, 2021 – January 3, 2023
- Preceded by: Susan Kent
- Succeeded by: Mark Johnson

Member of the Minnesota Senate from the 49th district
- In office January 8, 2013 – January 3, 2023
- Preceded by: Geoff Michel (41st district, redistricted)
- Succeeded by: Steve Cwodzinski

Personal details
- Born: Melisa López Aquino; June 9, 1980 (age 46) Aguadilla, Puerto Rico
- Party: Democratic
- Spouse: Nathan Franzen (m. 2006)
- Children: 2
- Education: Interamerican University, San Germán (BA); University of Minnesota (MPP); Hamline University (JD)

Melisa López Franzen (née López Aquino, born 1980) is an American politician and former member of the Minnesota Senate. A member of the Minnesota Democratic–Farmer–Labor Party (DFL), she represented District 49 in the southwest Twin Cities metropolitan area, including the Minneapolis suburbs of Edina, Eden Prairie, Bloomington, and Minnetonka.

== Early life, education, and career ==
López Franzen was born and raised in Aguadilla, Puerto Rico. She attended the Interamerican University of Puerto Rico and graduated in 2001 with a Bachelor of Arts in political science. She later attended the Hubert H. Humphrey School of Public Affairs at the University of Minnesota, graduating in 2003 with a Master of Public Policy in economic development, and Hamline University School of Law, graduating in 2006 with a Juris Doctor.

For eight years, López Franzen was an attorney at Target Corporation, where she held various positions in government affairs and community relations. In 2014, she co-founded and was president of the Minneapolis-based public relations firm NewPublica.

López Franzen left NewPublica to start a new role as the executive director of Government and Community Relations for the University of Minnesota, effective August 28, 2023.

== Minnesota Senate and subsequent political career ==
López Franzen was elected to the Minnesota Senate in 2012 and reelected in 2016 and 2020. She served on the Finance, Human Services Reform Finance and Policy, and as Ranking Minority Chair of the Commerce and Consumer Protection Finance and Policy Committee. From 2021 to 2023, she served as minority leader.

In 2022, after new legislative maps put López Franzen in the same district as Ron Latz, she announced she would not run for reelection.

In March 2025, López Franzen announced her candidacy in the 2026 election for the United States Senate seat held by Tina Smith, who is not seeking reelection. She has been said to be running as "a fiscal moderate who also fights for education and affordable healthcare". She dropped out of the race a few months later after falling behind her opponents in fundraising.

== Personal life ==
López Franzen has been married to Nathan Franzen since 2006. They have two children and reside in Edina, Minnesota.

=== Awards ===
In 2022, López Franzen was honored at the Humphrey-Mondale Awards and received the Joan and Walter Mondale Award for Public Service.

Minnesota Senate
Preceded by Susan Kent	Minority Leader of the Minnesota Senate; 2021–2023	Succeeded by Mark Johnson
