= Todd Lippert =

American politician and pastor

Member of the Minnesota House of Representatives from the 20B district
- In office January 7, 2019 – January 2, 2023
- Preceded by: David Bly
- Succeeded by: Kristi Pursell

Personal details
- Born: January 26, 1977 (age 49) Larchwood, Iowa, U.S.
- Party: Democratic
- Children: 3
- Education: University of Iowa (BM); United Theological Seminary of the Twin Cities (MDiv)

Todd Lippert (born January 26, 1977) is an American politician and former pastor who served as a member of the Minnesota House of Representatives from 2019 to 2022. A member of the Minnesota Democratic–Farmer–Labor Party (DFL), he represented District 20B which includes the city of Northfield and portions of Le Sueur and Rice County in south-central Minnesota.

== Early life and education ==
Lippert was born in Larchwood, Iowa. He attended the University of Iowa, graduating with a Bachelor of Music in music performance. He later attended the United Theological Seminary of the Twin Cities, graduating with a Master of Divinity in theology.

== Career ==
Lippert served as a pastor in local churches from 2003 to February 2020. He served as a senior minister at the United Church of Christ in Northfield, Minnesota, from 2012 to 2020.

=== Minnesota House of Representatives ===
Lippert was elected to the Minnesota House of Representatives in 2018, winning the seat left open by former representative David Bly, who announced his retirement in February 2018. Lippert stated that he became active in politics through his work as a pastor, getting involved in faith-based groups such as ISAIAH Minnesota which led to him wanting to run for office. During the 2021–2022 session, Lippert served as an assistant majority leader. In January 2022, Lippert announced he would not seek re-election for a third term, stating that he would like to continue working to help Democrats connect with rural communities.

While in the legislature, Lippert authored many bills relating to rural communities, small farmers, soil and water health, and combating climate change. Alongside Republican Mike Goggin, Lippert advocated for a "Farm to School" program to get local produce into school lunches. He proposed a ban on chlorpyrifos, the most widely used pesticide for soybean farms in Minnesota, and which can cause brain damage in children. In 2022, he authored a bill creating a carbon trading program alongside Senator Dave Senjem. Lippert also worked with senate republicans to pass a bill that increased the minimum wage of caregivers employed by the state through Medicaid.

2021–2022 committee assignments:

- Agriculture Finance and Policy
- Climate and Energy Finance and Policy
- Environment and Natural Resources Finance and Policy
- Human Services Finance and Policy: Behavioral Health Policy

2019–2020 committee assignments:

- Agriculture and Food Finance and Policy
- Environment and Natural Resources Policy
- Labor
- Long Term Care
- State Government Finance

== Electoral Results ==
2020 Election for Minnesota State Representative District 20B
Party	Candidate	Votes	%	±%
Democratic (DFL)	Todd Lippert	12,585	52.5%	−2.8%
Republican	Joe Moravchik	11,366	47.4%	+2.7%

2018 Election for Minnesota State Representative District 20B
Party	Candidate	Votes	%	±%
Democratic (DFL)	Todd Lippert	10,925	55.3%	N/A
Republican	Josh Gare	8,819	44.7%	N/A%

== Personal life ==
Lippert and his wife, Sara, have three children. They reside in Northfield, Minnesota.
