= John Petersburg =

American politician

Member of the Minnesota House of Representatives from the 19B district 24A (2013-2022)
- In office January 8, 2013 – January 14, 2025
- Preceded by: redrawn district
- Succeeded by: Thomas Sexton

Personal details
- Born: April 8, 1952 (age 74) Owatonna, Minnesota
- Party: Republican Party of Minnesota
- Spouse: Susan
- Children: 8
- Education: Minnesota State University, Mankato (B.S.)
- Occupation: legislator, church administrator

John Petersburg (born April 8, 1952) is an American politician who served in the Minnesota House of Representatives from 2013 to 2025. A member of the Republican Party of Minnesota, Petersburg represented District 19B in southeast-central Minnesota, including the cities of Owatonna and Waseca and parts of Steele and Waseca Counties.

== Early life, education and career ==
Petersburg was born in Owatonna, Minnesota and attended Claremont High School. He attended Minnesota State University, Mankato, graduating with a B.S. in public administration and paralegal studies. Petersburg was a church administrator at Trinity Lutheran Church in Owatonna for 21 years. He served on the Dodge Center School Board during the 1980s and '90s.

== Minnesota House of Representatives ==
Petersburg was elected to the Minnesota House of Representatives in 2012, following redistricting and the retirement of incumbent Kory Kath, and was elected every two years until his retirement in 2024.

In 2017-18, Petersburg served as vice-chair of the Transportation Finance Committee. Later, he was the minority lead on the Transportation Finance and Policy Committee and sat on the Housing Finance and Policy and Ways and Means Committees.

== Electoral history ==
2012 Minnesota State House - District 24A
Party	Candidate	Votes	%
Republican	John Petersburg	9,906	52.18
Democratic (DFL)	Craig Brenden	9,036	47.60
Write-in		41	0.22
Total votes		18,983	100.0
Republican gain from Democratic (DFL)			

2014 Minnesota State House - District 24A
Party	Candidate	Votes	%
Republican	John Petersburg (incumbent)	7,202	54.73
Democratic (DFL)	Beverly Cashman	5,949	45.21
Write-in		7	0.05
Total votes		13,158	100.0
Republican hold			

2016 Minnesota State House - District 24A
Party	Candidate	Votes	%
Republican	John Petersburg (incumbent)	11,156	56.87
Democratic (DFL)	Beverly Cashman	8,439	43.02
Write-in		21	0.11
Total votes		19,616	100.0
Republican hold			

2018 Minnesota State House - District 24A
Party	Candidate	Votes	%
Republican	John Petersburg (incumbent)	10,197	60.60
Democratic (DFL)	Joe Heegard	6,616	39.32
Write-in		13	0.08
Total votes		16,826	100.0
Republican hold			

2020 Minnesota State House - District 24A
Party	Candidate	Votes	%
Republican	John Petersburg (incumbent)	13,066	61.15
Democratic (DFL)	Tom Shea	8,281	38.76
Write-in		19	0.09
Total votes		21,366	100.0
Republican hold			

2022 Minnesota State House - District 19B
Party	Candidate	Votes	%
Republican	John Petersburg (incumbent)	12,765	71.12
Democratic (DFL)	Abdulahi Ali Osman	5,166	28.78
Write-in		18	0.10
Total votes		17,949	100.0
Republican hold			

== Personal life ==
Petersburg is married to his wife, Susan. They have eight children and reside in Waseca, Minnesota. He is Lutheran.
