= Steve Sandell =

American politician

Member of the Minnesota House of Representatives from the 53B district
- In office January 8, 2019 – January 3, 2023
- Preceded by: Kelly Fenton
- Succeeded by: Rick Hansen

Personal details
- Born: June 1940 (age 86)
- Party: Democratic–Farmer–Labor
- Spouse: Eunice Nelson (m. 1968)
- Children: 2
- Education: Macalester College; Brown University; Stanford University

Steve Sandell (born June 1940) is an American politician and member of the Minnesota House of Representatives. A member of the Minnesota Democratic–Farmer–Labor Party (DFL), he represents District 53B in the eastern Twin Cities metropolitan area.

== Early life, education, and career ==
Sandell graduated from University High School. He attended Brown University, graduating with a Bachelor of Arts in history, and Stanford University, graduating with a Master of Arts in education and public policy.

Sandell is a retired teacher, having taught in Saint Paul, Mendota Heights, and Stockholm, Sweden.

== Minnesota House of Representatives ==
Sandell was first elected to the Minnesota House of Representatives in 2018, defeating Republican incumbent Kelly Fenton. He was reelected in 2020. After redistricting his district was redrawn and he declined to seek re-election.

2021-2022 Committee Assignments:

- Vice Chair Industrial Education and Economic Development Finance and Policy
- Taxes
- Human Services Finance and Policy
- Higher Education Finance and Policy

2019-2020 Committee Assignments:

- Education Finance
- Education Policy
- Environment and Natural Resources Finance
- Water Division

== Electoral history ==
2020 Minnesota State Representative - House 53B
Party	Candidate	Votes	%	±%
Democratic (DFL)	Steve Sandell (Incumbent)	16269	53.09	+0.80
Republican	Kelly Jahner-Byrne	14350	46.83	−0.80
Write-in		23	0.08	0.00

2018 Minnesota State Representative - House 53B
Party	Candidate	Votes	%	±%
Democratic (DFL)	Steve Sandell	12261	52.29	+8.73
Republican	Kelly Fenton (Incumbent)	11169	47.63	−8.72
Write-in		18	0.08	-0.01

== Personal life ==
Sandell and his wife, Eunice Nelson, have two children. He resides in Woodbury, Minnesota.
