= Paul Gazelka =

American politician

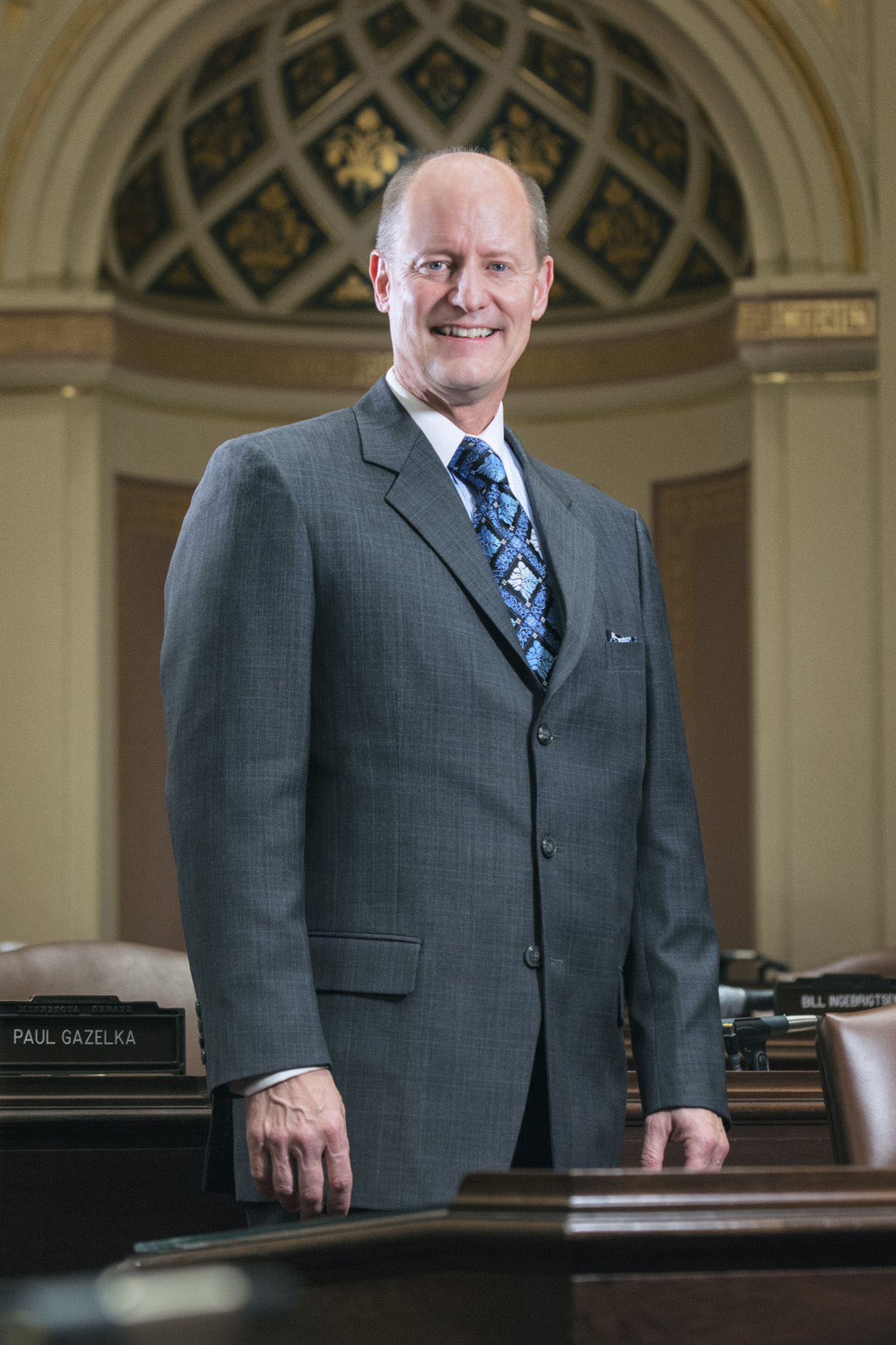
- Gazelka in 2017

Majority Leader of the Minnesota Senate
- In office January 3, 2017 – September 1, 2021
- Preceded by: Tom Bakk
- Succeeded by: Jeremy Miller

Member of the Minnesota Senate from the 9th district 12th (2011–2013)
- In office January 4, 2011 – January 3, 2023
- Preceded by: Paul Koering (12th), Keith Langseth (9th)
- Succeeded by: Torrey Westrom (12th, Jordan Rasmusson (9th)

Member of the Minnesota House of Representatives from the 12A district
- In office January 4, 2005 – January 2, 2007
- Preceded by: Dale Walz
- Succeeded by: John Ward

Personal details
- Born: October 1, 1959 (age 66) Saint Paul, Minnesota, U.S.
- Party: Republican
- Spouse: Maralee
- Children: 5
- Education: University of Minnesota Duluth (attended); Oral Roberts University (BS)

Paul E. Gazelka (/ɡəˈzɛlkə/ gə-ZEL-kə; born October 1, 1959) is an American politician and small business owner from Minnesota. A Republican, Gazelka was a member of the Minnesota Senate and was previously a member of the Minnesota House of Representatives. In the state senate, Gazelka served as majority leader from 2017 to 2021.

Born and raised in Saint Paul, Minnesota, Gazelka spent his later formative years in Minnesota's Iron Range region. He lives near Gull Lake in Cass County, Minnesota. He represented Senate District 9, which included parts of Cass, Morrison, Todd, and Wadena Counties in the north central part of the state.

== Early life, education, and career ==
Gazelka was born on October 1, 1959, in St. Paul, Minnesota. He lived in St. Paul until age 15, when his family moved to Virginia, Minnesota, a city on the state's Mesabi Iron Range. Gazelka attended Roosevelt High School there and then Oral Roberts University in Tulsa, Oklahoma, where he graduated with a bachelor's degree in business management.

Gazelka is an insurance agent. He owns and operates an insurance agency in Baxter.

== Minnesota House of Representatives ==
After settling in the Nisswa, Minnesota, area, Gazelka became involved in local politics. He was a member of the Minnesota House of Representatives from 2005 to 2007, elected from District 12A, which covers portions of Crow Wing County, including the city of Brainerd. During his term, he served as vice chair of the Commerce and Financial Institutions Committee and on the Jobs and Economic Opportunity Policy Finance Committee, the Transportation Committee, and the Commerce and Financial Institutions Subcommittee for the Tourism Division. Gazelka was defeated for reelection in 2006.

== Minnesota Senate ==
Gazelka was elected to the Minnesota Senate in 2010, defeating incumbent Republican Paul Koering in an August primary election and the Democratic nominee in the November general election. He was the senator from District 12 (covering Crow Wing and Morrison counties) from 2011 to 2012, and then District 9 (covering Cass, Morrison, Todd, and Wadena counties) from 2013 onward.

After redistricting, Gazelka was placed in Senate District 9. He was reelected to the Senate in 2012, 2016, and 2020. Republicans lost control of the Minnesota Senate in 2012. As a member of the minority, Gazelka was known for his interest in tax and insurance issues. After the 2016 election, in which Republicans regained a majority in the Senate, Gazelka was elected by his caucus to be majority leader.

Ideologically, Gazelka is member of the Christian right. His 2010 primary victory over Koering, Minnesota's only openly gay Republican legislator, was partially credited to the criticism Koering received for going to dinner with an adult film star, and Gazelka's subsequent legislative career has included efforts to oppose same-sex marriage and government funding of abortion. The Star Tribune called Gazelka "the most socially conservative person in modern times to serve as Minnesota Senate majority leader." But in 2017, upon becoming majority leader, Gazelka said that he intended to focus on transportation, health care, timely passage of a state budget, and tax cuts, and to avoid contentious social issues.

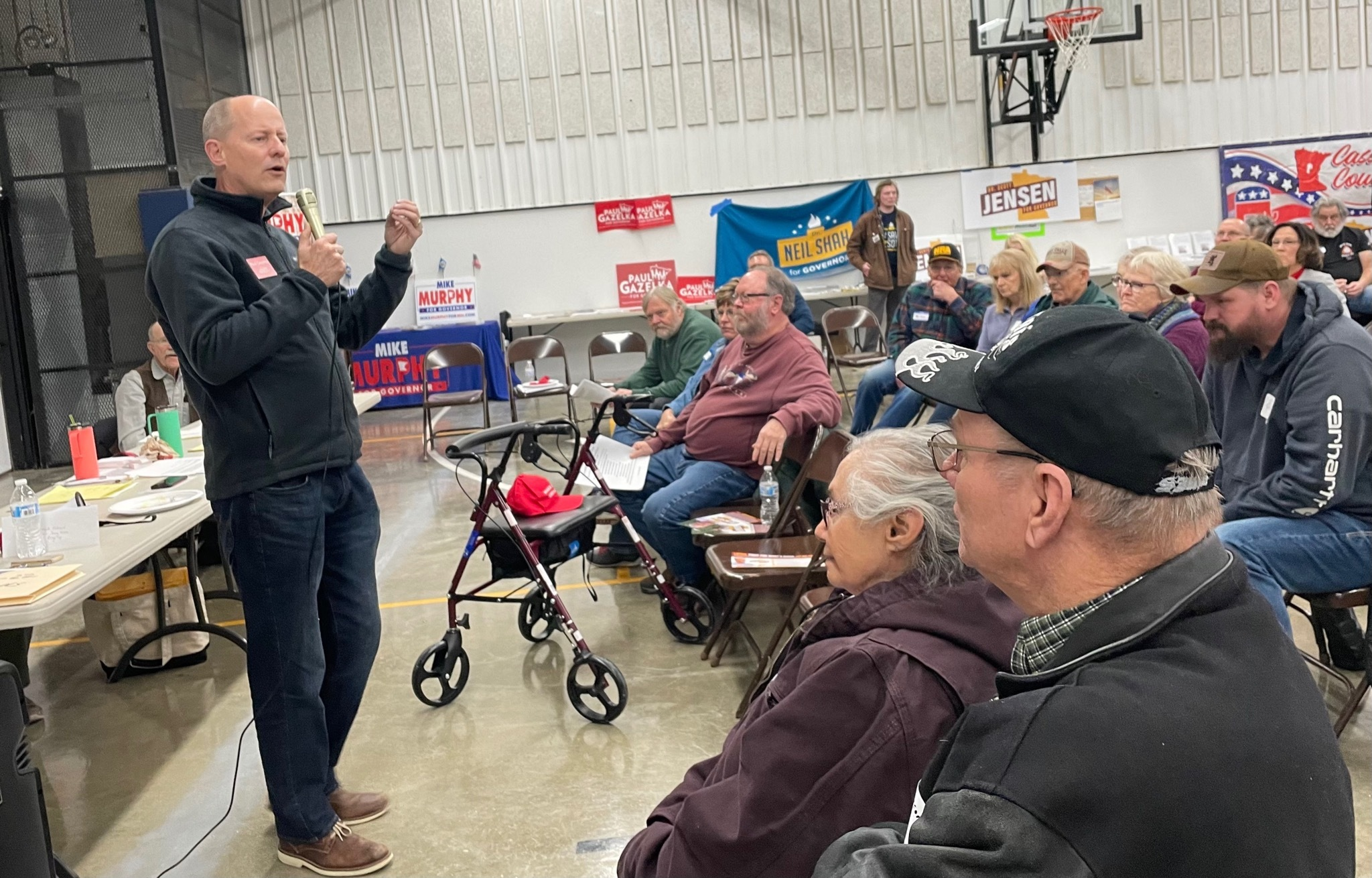
Paul Gazelka campaigning for governor in Cass County.

In 2021 Gazelka stepped down from his position as majority leader to focus on his campaign for governor of Minnesota.

=== Economic issues ===
In 2017, soon after he became majority leader, Gazelka brokered deals with Democrats for state/federal tax code reconciliation and short-term relief for individuals with high health insurance premiums. He also pressed for expedited budget committee deadlines, expressing a desire to avoid a repeat of the 2011 Minnesota state government shutdown.

=== Social issues ===
==== LGBT rights ====
Gazelka opposes same-sex marriage and co-sponsored a failed 2012 effort to amend the state constitution to ban the recognition of same-sex marriage in the state. More recently, he blocked proposals to ban "conversion therapy" for minors in Minnesota, though he has said that he did not support "coercive or aversive counseling." Gazelka and his wife once sent their child to an anti-same-sex relationship psychologist who has been characterized as a conversion therapist.

==== Abortion ====
In 2017, Gazelka supported a bill, introduced by Republican Senator Mary Kiffmeyer, to block the Minnesota Department of Human Services from funding abortion services. The department said that the bill, if enacted, would likely be blocked by the courts given a 1995 Minnesota Supreme Court decision that struck down a similar measure. The bill passed the Minnesota legislature but was vetoed by Governor Mark Dayton. In 2019, Gazelka sponsored legislation to ban abortion in Minnesota 20 weeks after fertilization; the proposal did not advance.

==== Marijuana ====
Gazelka staunchly opposes legalization of recreational adult-use marijuana in Minnesota. In 2021, after the state House passed a legalization bill on a 72–61 vote, Gazelka blocked it from being taken up by the state Senate.

=== Police reform ===
In 2020, after the murder of George Floyd and subsequent protests, Gazelka and Minnesota Senate Republicans blocked most police reform proposals put forth by Governor Tim Walz and the Democratic-majority state House. Gazelka specifically opposed changes to qualified immunity. A compromise reform package was agreed upon in a subsequent special session; the compromise bill banned police chokeholds in most situations, prohibited "warrior cop" training that promoted aggression, and mandated that officers intervene when another officer uses excessive force. In 2021, Gazelka opposed a bill, supported by Walz and passed by the state House, that would ban no-knock search warrants, require police departments to timely release body camera footage of death in custody to decedents' families; authorize local governments to establish civilian police oversight boards; and bar police officers from belonging to white supremacist organizations. He said the Senate would not take up the House proposals because he was satisfied with the reforms that passed the preceding year.

=== COVID-19 pandemic ===
==== COVID-19 policy ====
During the COVID-19 pandemic, Gazelka was one of the most outspoken opponents of public health mandates (such as business closures and requirements to wear face coverings in indoor public places) imposed by Minnesota Governor Tim Walz to prevent the spread of the COVID-19 virus. Gazelka led Republicans in blocking a Democratic proposal to require face coverings in public areas of the State Capitol. Many Republican senators refused to wear face coverings in the Senate chamber, straining relations with the Democrats. In December 2020, after Minnesota Attorney General Keith Ellison sought civil penalties against bars and restaurants that flouted the state's COVID-19 rules, Gazelka threatened to reduce the budget for the attorney general's office.

In October 2020, Gazelka and Minnesota Republican leaders launched a campaign (with the theme "Contract to Open Up Minnesota") that called for an end to state-mandated COVID-safety protocols such as wearing masks and limited restaurant capacities and called for returning more children to in-person learning. Gazelka and Minnesota Republicans praised the Dakotas for having few COVID-19 related restrictions, although the Dakotas had the highest case rates in the nation at the time.

Gazelka criticized Walz for ordering the closure of public schools in 2020 due to the COVID-19 pandemic; in 2021, the state Senate passed a bill that would block governors from closing schools in the state or from altering school schedules. Gazelka opposed COVID-19 vaccine mandates and criticized Walz for requiring state employees to be either vaccinated against COVID-19 or receive weekly testing for COVID-19.

==== Superspreader event ====
On November 5, 2020, during the COVID-19 pandemic, Gazelka attended a Republican Party event at a catering hall to celebrate the party's victories in the 2020 elections. At the superspreader event, which included more than 100 people, many attendees did not wear protective face masks, contrary to public health recommendations, and at least four Republican state senators (including Gazelka) tested positive for COVID-19 in the subsequent days. Gazelka flew to Florida while unaware of his exposure. He experienced symptoms.

Gazelka notified the host venue of the outbreak 10 days after it occurred. Senate Republicans notified their own caucus members of the outbreak but did not inform Democrats, who had been in session with Republicans earlier that week; Democrats learned about the outbreak only from later news reports. That lapse angered Democrats, including Senate Minority Leader Susan Kent (who called for Gazelka's resignation as majority leader) and Governor Walz. It was believed that an election night dinner on November 3, 2020, was the original source of the post-election outbreak. Republican State Senator Jerry Relph, one of the attendees of the post-election event, died from complications due to COVID-19 on December 18. Relph's daughter called on Gazelka to apologize for his role in her father's death, saying that the event Gazelka hosted was a "frivolous and vain action." Through a spokeswoman, Gazelka declined to say if he bore any responsibility for Relph's death. Asked whether he regretted participating in the superspreader event, he said, "I don't regret that we had the celebration. The Republican majority was the No. 1 target to switch from Republican to Democrat." In a statement, Gazelka said the event had been legal according to guidelines at the time, and called for an end of the "blaming and shaming" of Senate Republicans for hosting it.

=== 2020 election ===
Before the November 2020 elections, and amid the COVID-19 pandemic, Gazelka had strongly opposed an expansion of voting by mail. After President Donald Trump lost the presidential election, Gazelka (as well as the Republican leader in the State House, Minority Leader Kurt Daudt) refused to denounce Trump's attempts to overturn the election result or to contradict Trump's false claims of election fraud. Gazelka's and Daudt's refusal to acknowledge that Trump lost the election fairly was criticized by Democratic Governor Tim Walz as "some pretty epic gaslighting."

=== 2022 campaign for governor ===
In September 2021, Gazelka resigned as Senate majority leader and announced that he would seek the Republican nomination for governor in 2022. He faced several opponents in the Republican primary election.

The Republican primary election was scheduled for August 2022, but Gazelka (like other Republican candidates) pledged to honor the endorsement of the state Republican Party. At the May 2022 state Republican convention, Scott Jensen won the party endorsement, defeating four other candidates: Gazelka, Lexington Mayor Mike Murphy, businessman Kendall Qualls, and dermatologist Neil Shah.

== Personal life ==
Gazelka and his family formerly lived in Brainerd and then Nisswa. They now live in East Gull Lake. Gazelka's wife is Maralee; they have five children.

Gazelka and his wife sent one of their five children, who came out as a lesbian as a teenager and later identified as bigender, to the counseling practice of Marcus Bachmann, an anti-same-sex relationship psychologist. Amid a subsequent Minnesota Senate debate over a proposal to ban conversion therapy, Gazelka's child (now an adult) described the practice as a form of psychological "harassment" she called "tantamount to torture."

Active in his Protestant church, Gazelka wrote a memoir, Marketplace Ministers: Awakening God's People in the Workplace to Their Ultimate Purpose, describing his religious beliefs and career in the insurance business. It was published in 2003 by Creation House Press, a Christian publishing house.

Minnesota Senate
Preceded by Tom Bakk	Majority Leader of the Minnesota Senate; 2017–2021	Succeeded by Mark Johnson; Acting
