= Liz Olson =

American politician

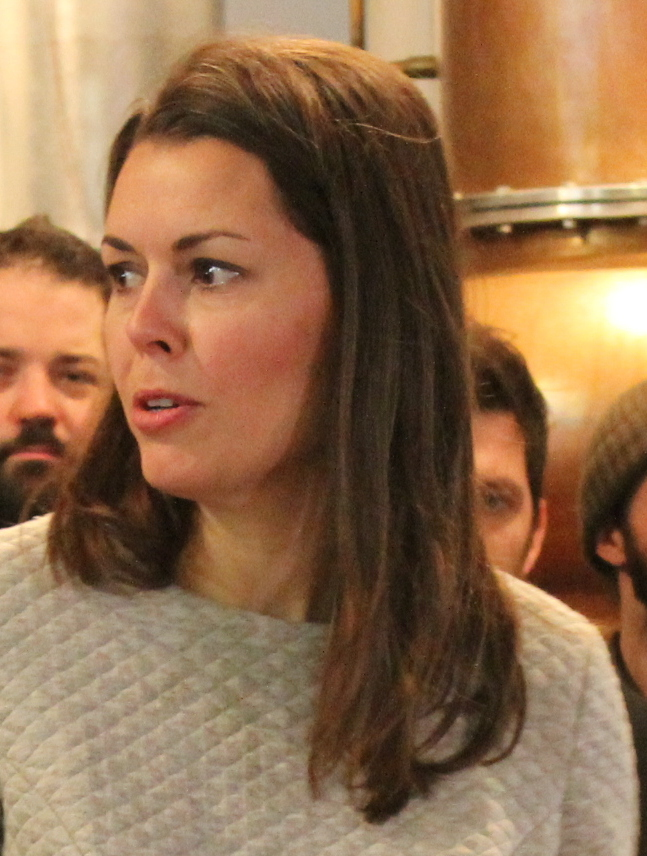

Speaker pro tempore of the Minnesota House of Representatives
- In office January 8, 2019 – January 2, 2023
- Preceded by: Laurie Halverson
- Succeeded by: Dan Wolgamott

Member of the Minnesota House of Representatives
- In office January 3, 2017 – July 5, 2024
- Preceded by: Erik Simonson
- Succeeded by: Peter Johnson
- Constituency: 7B (2017–2023); 8A (2023–2024)

Personal details
- Born: 1980 or 1981 (age 44–45)
- Party: Democratic (DFL)
- Spouse: Tom
- Children: 1
- Education: University of Minnesota, Duluth (BA); Luther Seminary (MA)
- Occupation: Community organizer; Legislator
- Website: Government website Campaign website

Liz Olson is an American politician who formerly served in the Minnesota House of Representatives. A member of the Minnesota Democratic–Farmer–Labor Party (DFL), Olson represented District 8A in northeastern Minnesota, which includes parts of the city of Duluth in St. Louis County.

== Early life, education, and career ==
Olson attended the University of Minnesota Duluth, graduating with a Bachelor of Arts in sociology and women's studies, and Luther Seminary, graduating with a Master of Arts in congregational and community care.

Olson is a community organizer who has worked for Churches United in Ministry, Generations Health Care Initiatives, and TakeAction Minnesota. She is a former president of the League of Women Voters, Duluth, is a member of the advisory committee of the Minnesota Council of Nonprofits northeast chapter, and is a board member of Firefly Yoga International.

== Minnesota House of Representatives ==
Olson was elected to the Minnesota House of Representatives in 2016 and was reelected every two years through 2022. She first ran after two-term DFL incumbent Erik Simonson announced he would seek election to the Minnesota Senate. In 2020, her opponent contested the election results, but a court dismissed the case.

Olson served as speaker pro tempore of the House from 2019 to 2022. From 2019 to 2020 she served as the majority whip for the House DFL Caucus, and from 2021 to 2022 as deputy majority leader. Olson chaired the Ways and Means Committee during her final term.

Having already announced her decision not to seek reelection, Olson resigned her seat in mid-2024, taking a position with the McKnight Foundation.

== Electoral history ==
2016 Minnesota State House - District 7B
Party	Candidate	Votes	%
Democratic (DFL)	Liz Olson	13,824	70.87
Republican	Cody Barringer	5,641	28.92
Write-in		40	0.21
Total votes		19,505	100.0
Democratic (DFL) hold			

2018 Minnesota State House - District 7B
Party	Candidate	Votes	%
Democratic (DFL)	Liz Olson (incumbent)	12,739	71.84
Republican	Caroline Burley	4,965	28.00
Write-in		28	0.16
Total votes		17,732	100.0
Democratic (DFL) hold			

2020 Minnesota State House - District 7B
Party	Candidate	Votes	%
Democratic (DFL)	Liz Olson (incumbent)	14,769	68.15
Republican	Art Johnston	6,879	31.74
Write-in		23	0.11
Total votes		21,671	100.0
Democratic (DFL) hold			

2022 Minnesota State House - District 8A
Party	Candidate	Votes	%
Democratic (DFL)	Liz Olson (incumbent)	11,587	70.48
Republican	Art Johnston	4,830	29.38
Write-in		22	0.13
Total votes		16,439	100.0
Democratic (DFL) hold			

== Personal life ==
Olson and her husband, Tom, have one child. They reside in the Denfeld neighborhood in Duluth, Minnesota.

Minnesota House of Representatives
Preceded by Laurie Halverson	Speaker pro tempore of the Minnesota House of Representatives; 2019–2023	Succeeded by Dan Wolgamott
