= Tom Bakk =

American politician

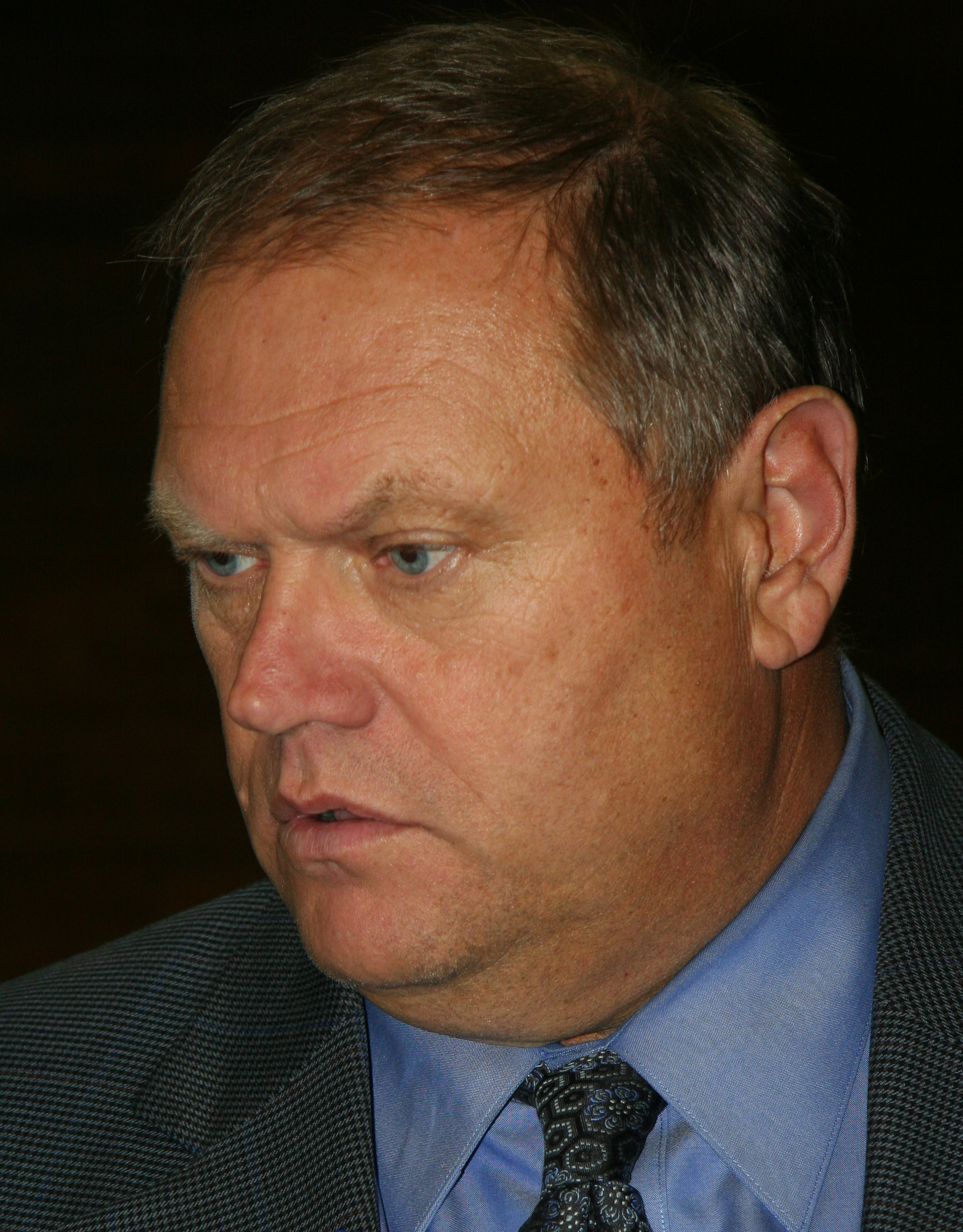
- Bakk in 2009

Minority Leader of the Minnesota Senate
- In office January 3, 2017 – February 1, 2020
- Preceded by: David Hann
- Succeeded by: Susan Kent
- In office January 4, 2011 – January 7, 2013
- Preceded by: Dave Senjem
- Succeeded by: David Hann

Majority Leader of the Minnesota Senate
- In office January 8, 2013 – January 2, 2017
- Preceded by: Dave Senjem
- Succeeded by: Paul Gazelka

Member of the Minnesota Senate from the 3rd district (2013–2023) and 6th district (2003–2013) district
- In office January 7, 2003 – January 2, 2023
- Preceded by: Doug Johnson (6th), Tom Saxhaug (3rd)
- Succeeded by: Dave Tomassoni (6th), Grant Hauschild(3rd)

Member of the Minnesota House of Representatives from the 6A district
- In office January 3, 1995 – January 6, 2003
- Preceded by: David Peter Battaglia
- Succeeded by: David Dill

Personal details
- Born: June 8, 1954 (age 72) Virginia, Minnesota, U.S.
- Party: Democratic (before 2020); Independent (2020–present)
- Spouse: Laura
- Children: 4
- Education: Mesabi Range College; University of Minnesota, Duluth (BA)

Thomas M. Bakk (/bɑːk/ BAHK; born June 8, 1954) is a Minnesota politician. He served in the Minnesota Legislature from 1995 to 2023 and is a former majority leader and minority leader.

== Early life, education, and career ==
Bakk was born and raised in Cook, Minnesota, where he graduated from Cook High School in 1972. He received an associate degree from Mesabi Community College and a bachelor's degree in business administration and labor relations from the University of Minnesota Duluth. He is a retired union carpenter and labor official.

== Political career ==
=== Minnesota House of Representatives ===
Bakk represented District 6A in the Minnesota House of Representatives from 1995 to 2003.

=== Minnesota Senate ===
Bakk was first elected to the Minnesota Senate in 2002 and went on to win reelection five times. After the 2010 election, in which Republicans gained control of the Senate for the first time since party designation, Bakk was elected by his caucus to serve as its first-ever minority leader. After the DFL regained a majority in the 2012 election, Bakk was elected by his caucus to serve as majority leader, a position he assumed when the legislature convened on January 8, 2013. Bakk was again elected by his caucus to serve as minority leader following the 2016 election, which saw Republicans regain control of the upper chamber.

In late 2019, it was reported that Susan Kent, a state senator from Woodbury, intended to challenge Bakk for his caucus leadership post. On February 1, 2020, in a caucus meeting that lasted more than six hours, Kent defeated Bakk, succeeding him as minority leader.

Three weeks after the 2020 elections, when it was determined that the DFL did not win a majority in the Senate, Bakk and fellow DFL state senator David Tomassoni announced they would no longer caucus with Democrats and instead form their own “independent caucus.” Republican Majority Leader Paul Gazelka welcomed the move and gave Bakk the chairmanship to the Capital Investment in exchange for voting in line with the Republican Party on floor votes. This changed the composition of the Senate to 34 Republicans, 31 Democrats, and two independents.

In March 2022, Bakk announced he was not seeking re-election to the State Senate and would retire from politics at the end of the year. Bakk endorsed Babbitt mayor Andrea Zupancich (GOP) to succeed him in the state Senate later that year.

=== 2010 Minnesota gubernatorial campaign ===
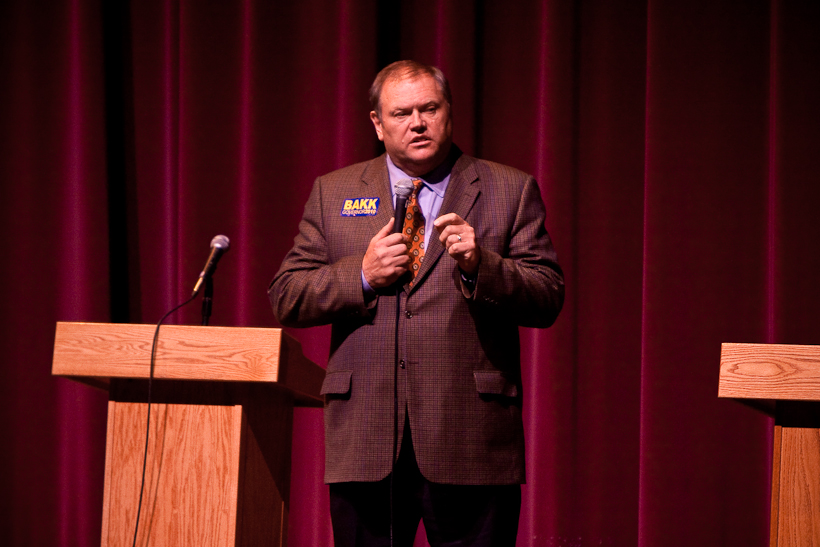
Bakk at a DFL gubernatorial debate in November 2009

Bakk campaigned in the 2010 Minnesota gubernatorial election. He led in early fundraising among the DFL candidates, raising $146,000 in 2008, and beginning 2009 with a little more than $131,000. He ended his campaign in March 2010.

== Electoral history ==
Minnesota Senate 3rd district election, 2012
| Party | Candidate | Votes | % | ±% |
|---|---|---|---|---|
| Democratic (DFL) | Tom Bakk (incumbent) | 28,427 | 64.59 | +1.55pp |
| Republican | Jennifer Havlick | 15,509 | 35.24 | −1.67pp |

Minnesota Senate 6th district election, 2010
| Party | Candidate | Votes | % | ±% |
|---|---|---|---|---|
| Democratic (DFL) | Tom Bakk (incumbent) | 21,728 | 62.94 | −8.39pp |
| Republican | Jennifer Havlick | 12,742 | 36.91 | +8.50pp |

Minnesota Senate 6th district election, 2006
| Party | Candidate | Votes | % | ±% |
|---|---|---|---|---|
| Democratic (DFL) | Tom Bakk (incumbent) | 25,275 | 71.33 | −0.93pp |
| Republican | Jennifer Havlick | 10,065 | 28.41 | |

Minnesota Senate 6th district election, 2002
| Party | Candidate | Votes | % | ±% |
|---|---|---|---|---|
| Democratic (DFL) | Tom Bakk | 24,934 | 72.26 | |
| Independence | Tom Norman | 9,467 | 27.44 | |

== Post-political career ==
Following his retirement from the Minnesota Legislature, Bakk began working as a lobbyist. He has represented clients including Twin Metals Minnesota. Twin Metals Minnesota is seeking to develop a copper-nickel sulfide mine near Ely, Minnesota, on land within the Superior National Forest. The proposed project has faced public opposition due to its proximity to the Boundary Waters Canoe Area Wilderness as well as environmental impacts, such as acid mine drainage leaching heavy metals into the surrounding waters, air pollution, noise pollution, and increased industrial activity in the region. Twin Metals is a subsidiary of the Chilean mining company Antofagasta PLC, owned by Chilean Billionaire Andrónico Luksic.

Bakk has also lobbied on behalf of Altria Client Services LLC, a subsidiary of Altria Group, formerly known as Philip Morris Companies Inc., which is one of the largest producers and marketers of tobacco products globally.

== Personal life ==
Bakk and his wife, Laura, who works as a legislative assistant in the Minnesota Senate, have four children. He is a Lutheran.

== See also ==
- Minnesota gubernatorial election, 2010

Minnesota House of Representatives
| Preceded by David Peter Battaglia | Member of the Minnesota House of Representatives from the 6A district 1995–2003 | Succeeded by David Dill |
Minnesota Senate
| Preceded by Doug Johnson | Member of the Minnesota Senate from the 3rd district 6th (2003–2013); 2003–2023 | Succeeded by Grant Hauschild |
| Preceded by Dave Senjem | Minority Leader of the Minnesota Senate; 2011–2013 | Succeeded by David Hann |
| Preceded by Dave Senjem | Majority Leader of the Minnesota Senate; 2013–2017 | Succeeded by Paul Gazelka |
| Preceded by David Hann | Minority Leader of the Minnesota Senate; 2017–2020 | Succeeded by Susan Kent |
