= Jerry Hertaus =

American politician

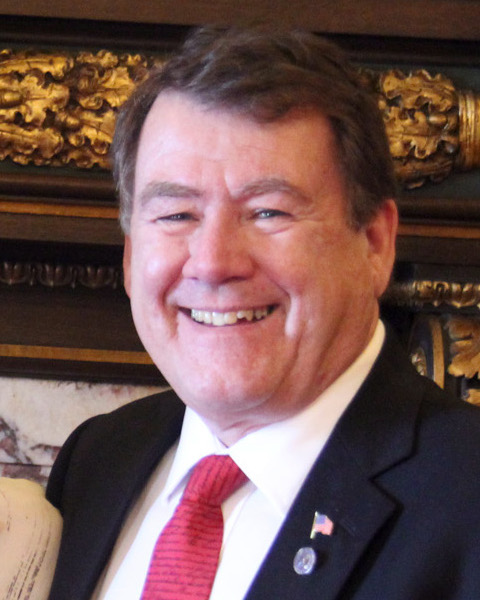

Member of the Minnesota House of Representatives from the 33A district
- Incumbent
- Assumed office January 8, 2013
- Preceded by: Steve Smith

Personal details
- Born: July 8, 1952 (age 74) Shakopee, Minnesota
- Party: Republican
- Spouse: Sharon
- Children: 3
- Education: University of Minnesota; North Hennepin Community College; St. Mary's College
- Occupation: legislator

Jerome Allan Hertaus (born July 8, 1952) is a Minnesota politician and member of the Minnesota House of Representatives. A member of the Republican Party of Minnesota, he represents District 33A in the western Twin Cities metropolitan area.

== Education ==
Hertaus graduated from St. Louis Park High School. He attended the University of Minnesota and North Hennepin Community College. He later attended and graduated from St. Mary's College.

== Minnesota House of Representatives ==
Hertaus was first elected to the Minnesota House of Representatives in 2012.

== Personal life ==
Hertaus is married to his wife, Sharon. They have three children and reside in Greenfield, Minnesota, where he served as mayor.
