= Mark Johnson (Minnesota politician) =

Member of the Minnesota Senate

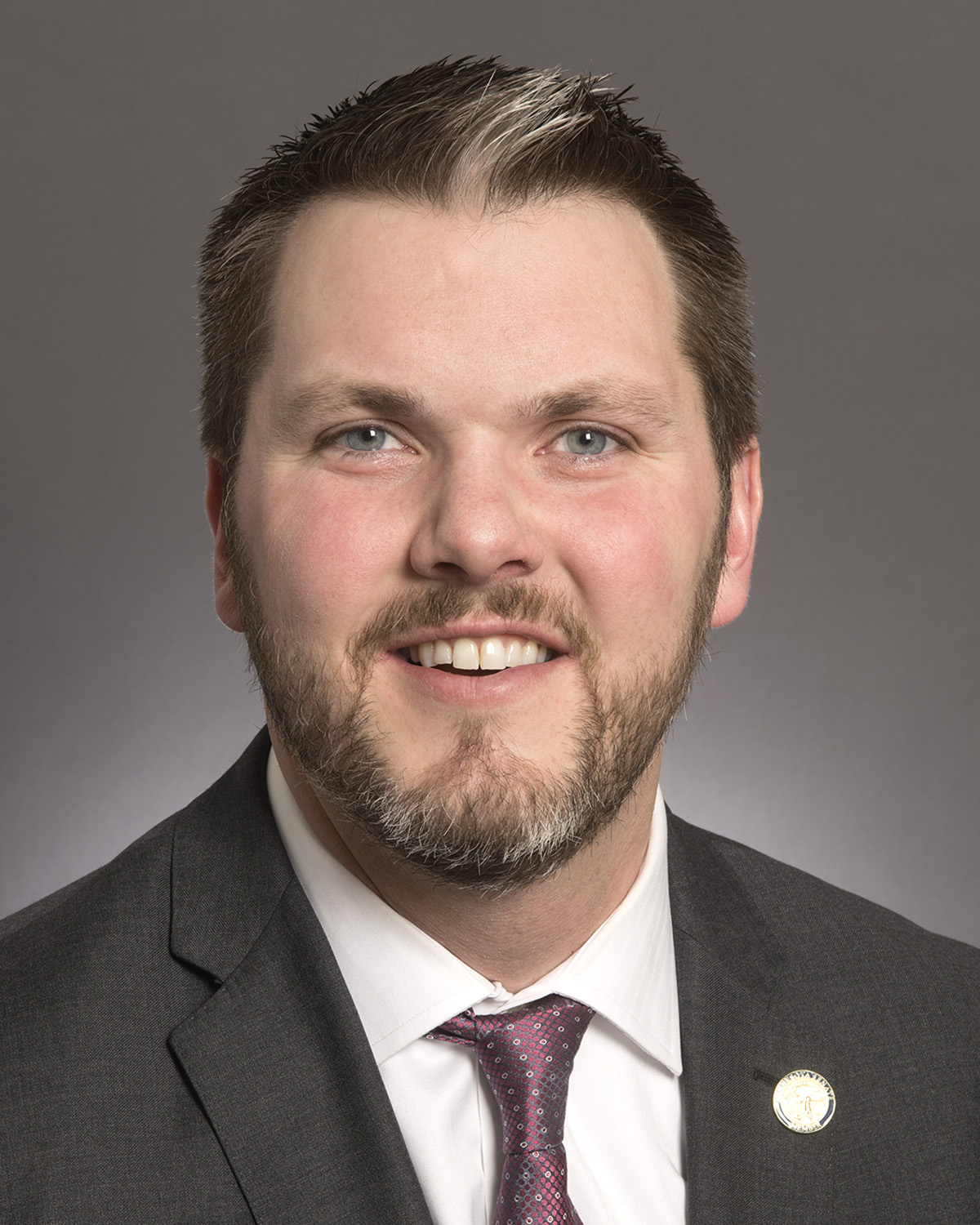
- Johnson in 2018

Minority Leader of the Minnesota Senate
- Incumbent
- Assumed office January 3, 2023
- Preceded by: Melisa Franzen

Acting Majority Leader of the Minnesota Senate
- In office September 1, 2021 – September 9, 2021
- Preceded by: Paul Gazelka
- Succeeded by: Jeremy Miller

Member of the Minnesota Senate from the 1st district
- Incumbent
- Assumed office January 3, 2017
- Preceded by: LeRoy Stumpf

Personal details
- Party: Republican
- Spouse: Skyler
- Children: 3
- Education: Bethel University (BA); University of North Dakota (JD)

Mark Johnson is an American lawyer, politician, and member of the Minnesota Senate. A Republican, Johnson represents parts of Kittson, Marshall, Pennington, Polk, Red Lake, Norman and Roseau counties in northwestern Minnesota. He previously served as acting majority leader of the Minnesota Senate, and now serves as minority leader.

== Early life, education, and career ==
Johnson was raised near Mentor, Minnesota. After graduating from Fertile-Beltrami High School, he received a bachelor's degree from Bethel University and a J.D. degree from the University of North Dakota. Johnson owns a legal firm in East Grand Forks, Minnesota and is a partner in his family's concrete business.

== Minnesota Senate ==
Johnson was elected to the Minnesota Senate in 2016 by a wide margin and reelected in 2020. He succeeded LeRoy Stumpf, who retired after 34 years in the Senate.

== Personal life ==
Johnson and his wife, Skyler, have three children and live in East Grand Forks.

Minnesota Senate
| Preceded by LeRoy Stumpf | Member of the Minnesota Senate from the 1st district 2017–present | Incumbent |
| Preceded by Paul Gazelka | Majority Leader of the Minnesota Senate; Acting; 2021 | Succeeded by Jeremy Miller |
| Preceded by Melisa Franzen | Minority Leader of the Minnesota Senate; 2023–present | Incumbent |
