= List of minority leaders of the Minnesota Senate =

This is a list of minority leaders of the Minnesota Senate.

From 1913 to 1973, Minnesota state legislators were elected on nonpartisan ballots. During this period, members caucused as "Liberals" or "Conservatives".

| Party/caucus | Name | Took office | Left office |
|---|---|---|---|
| Liberal | Bolesaw G. Novak | 1951 | 1955 |
| Liberal | Harold W. Schultz | 1955 | 1963 |
| Liberal | Paul A. Thuet | 1963 | 1967 |
| Liberal | Karl F. Grittner | 1967 | 1971 |
| Liberal | Nick Coleman | 1971 | 1973 |
| Republican | Harold G. Krieger | 1973 | 1975 |
| Republican/Independent-Republican | Robert O. Ashbach | 1975 | 1983 |
| Independent-Republican | James E. Ulland | 1983 | 1985 |
| Independent-Republican | Glen Taylor | 1985 | 1987 |
| Independent-Republican | Duane Benson | 1987 | 1993 |
| Independent-Republican/Republican | Dean Johnson | 1993 | 1995 |
| Republican | Dick Day | 1995 | 2007 |
| Republican | David Senjem | 2007 | 2011 |
| Democratic–Farmer–Labor | Tom Bakk | 2011 | 2013 |
| Republican | David Hann | 2013 | 2017 |
| Democratic–Farmer–Labor | Tom Bakk | 2017 | 2020 |
| Democratic–Farmer–Labor | Susan Kent | 2020 | 2021 |
| Democratic–Farmer–Labor | Melisa Franzen | 2021 | 2023 |
| Republican | Mark Johnson | 2023 | Incumbent |
