= Susan Kent (politician) =

American politician (born 1963)

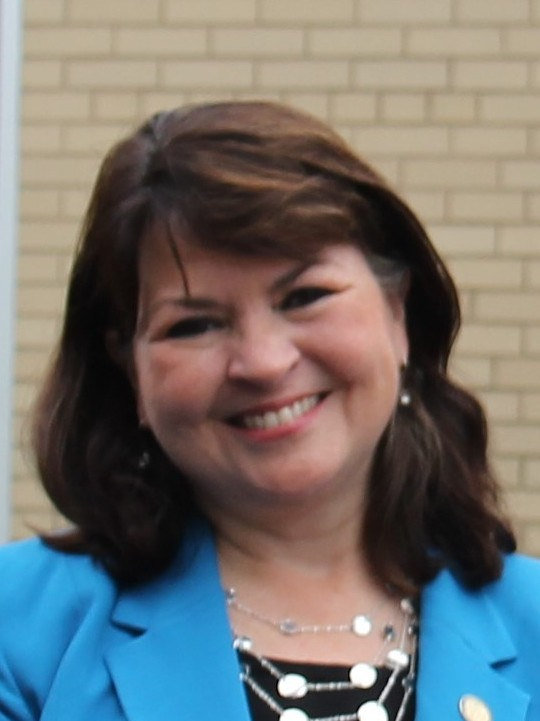

Minority Leader of the Minnesota Senate
- In office February 1, 2020 – September 14, 2021
- Preceded by: Tom Bakk
- Succeeded by: Melisa Franzen

Member of the Minnesota Senate from the 53rd district
- In office January 8, 2013 – January 3, 2023
- Preceded by: Redistricted
- Succeeded by: Nicole Mitchell (redistricting)

Personal details
- Born: Susan Lawson; November 18, 1963 (age 62) New Orleans, Louisiana, U.S.
- Party: Democratic (DFL)
- Spouse: Chris
- Children: 1
- Education: University of Texas, Austin (BS)

Susan Kent (born November 18, 1963) is a Minnesota politician and former minority leader of the Minnesota Senate. A member of the Minnesota Democratic–Farmer–Labor Party (DFL), she represented District 53 in the eastern Twin Cities metropolitan area from 2013 to 2023.

== Early life, education, and career ==
Kent was born in 1963 in New Orleans, Louisiana. She earned her bachelor's degree in communication studies from the University of Texas at Austin.

== Minnesota Senate ==
Kent was first elected to the Minnesota Senate in 2012.

In late 2019, it was reported that Kent intended to challenge Minority Leader Tom Bakk for his caucus leadership post. On February 1, 2020, after a private meeting that lasted more than six hours, the caucus elected Kent as its new leader. In September 2021 Susan Kent announced that she would not run for re-election, also choosing to step down as Senate Minority Leader.

== Personal life ==
Kent met her husband, Chris, a Maplewood native and 3M employee, in Austin, Texas. The couple moved to Woodbury, Minnesota in the mid-2000s. They have one child.

Minnesota Senate
Preceded by Tom Bakk	Minority Leader of the Minnesota Senate; 2020–2021	Succeeded by Melisa Franzen
