= 95th Minnesota Legislature =

Legislature of Minnesota, 2027–2029

←	94th	96th	→
- The Seal of Minnesota

Overview
- Term: January 12, 2027 – January 2029

Senate
- Members: 67 senators DFL (39); Republican (28)
- President: Bobby Joe Champion
- Majority Leader: Erin Murphy
- Minority Leader: Jordan Rasmusson

House of Representatives
- Members: 134 representatives DFL (77); Republican (57)
- Speaker: Zack Stephenson
- Minority Leader: Harry Niska

Sessions
- 2027: January 12, 2027 – TBD
- 2028: TBD – TBD

The Ninety-fifth Minnesota Legislature is the upcoming meeting of the legislative branch of the state of Minnesota, composed of the Minnesota Senate and the Minnesota House of Representatives. It will convene in Saint Paul on January 12, 2027, following the November 2026 elections for the House and Senate, which increased the Democratic-Farmer-Labor Party (DFL)'s lead in the Senate and swapped the House from a partisan tie to a DFL majority.

== Session ==
The 95th Minnesota Legislature will convene on January 12, 2027.

== Political composition ==
=== Senate ===
	Party (Shading indicates majority caucus)		Total	Vacant
	Democratic– Farmer–Labor	Republican	Total	Vacant
End of the previous Legislature	34	33	67	0
After the 2026 Minnesota Senate election	39	28 (Note: Two races are close enough for a state-funded recount; Republicans currently lead both.)	67	0
Latest voting share	58%	42%		

=== House of Representatives ===
	Party (Shading indicates majority caucus)		Total	Vacant
	Democratic– Farmer–Labor	Republican	Total	Vacant
End of the previous Legislature	67	67	134	0
After the 2026 election	77	57 (Note: In one race, the Republican candidate leads by 22 votes, a margin small enough for a state-funded recount.)	134	0
Latest voting share	57%	43%		

== Leadership ==
Preliminary leadership has been announced by the majority and minority parties, but will not be finalized until the session begins.

=== Senate ===
- President: Bobby Joe Champion

==== DFL leadership ====
- Majority Leader: Erin Murphy
- Deputy Majority Leader: Nick Frentz
- Assistant Majority Leaders:
  - Liz Boldon
  - Omar Fateh
- Majority Whip: Heather Gustafson
- Assistant Majority Whips:
  - Doron Clark
  - Susan Pha

==== Republican leadership ====
- Minority Leader: Jordan Rasmusson
- Assistant Minority Leaders:
  - Julia Coleman
  - Karin Housley
  - John Jasinski
  - Jeremy Munson

=== House of Representatives ===
- Speaker-designate: Zack Stephenson
- Speakers pro tempore:
  - Brion Curran
  - Nathan Coulter
  - Liz Lee

==== DFL leadership ====
- Majority Leader: Jamie Long
- Whip: Samantha Sencer-Mura

==== Republican leadership ====
- Minority Leader: Harry Niska
- Deputy Minority Leader: Jim Nash

== Members ==
=== Senate ===
District	Name	Party	Residence	First elected
1	Mark Johnson	Republican	East Grand Forks	2016
2	Steve Green	Republican	Fosston	2022
3	Grant Hauschild	DFL	Hermantown	2022
4	Austin Peterson	Republican	near Rollag	2026
5	Mike Wiener	Republican	Long Prairie	2026
6	Keri Heintzeman	Republican	Nisswa	2025 (Note: Elected in a special election.)
7	Robert Farnsworth	Republican	Hibbing	2022
8	Jen McEwen	DFL	Duluth	2020
9	Jordan Rasmusson	Republican	Fergus Falls	2022
10	Nathan Wesenberg	Republican	Little Falls	2022
11	Jason Rarick	Republican	Pine City	2019
12	Torrey Westrom	Republican	Alexandria	2012
13	Jared Gapinski	Republican	Sauk Rapids	2026
14	Aric Putnam	DFL	Saint Cloud	2020
15	Braxton Seifert	Republican	Marshall	2026
16	Andrew Lang	Republican	Olivia	2016
17	Glenn Gruenhagen	Republican	Glencoe	2022
18	Nick Frentz	DFL	North Mankato	2016
19	John Jasinski	Republican	Faribault	2016
20	Steven Jacob	Republican	Altura	2026
21	Chris Knoll	Republican	Saint James	2026
22	Jeremy Munson	Republican	Lake Crystal	2026
23	Gene Dornink	Republican	Hayfield	2020
24	Simon Glaser	DFL	Rochester	2026
25	Liz Boldon	DFL	Rochester	2022
26	Cherie Johnson	Republican	Winona,	2026
27	Andrew Mathews	Republican	Milaca	2016
28	Mark Koran	Republican	North Branch	2016
29	Michael Holmstrom Jr.	Republican	Buffalo	2025
30	Eric Lucero	Republican	Saint Michael	2022
31	Cal Bahr	Republican	East Bethel	2022
32	Chris Ford	DFL	Blaine	2026
33	Karin Housley	Republican	Stillwater	2012
34	John Hoffman	DFL	Champlin	2012
35	Angela Nelson	DFL	Coon Rapids	2026
36	Heather Gustafson	DFL	Vadnais Heights	2022
37	Kristy Janigo	DFL	Maple Grove	2026
38	Susan Pha	DFL	Brooklyn Park	2022
39	Mary Kunesh-Podein	DFL	New Brighton	2020
40	John Marty	DFL	Roseville	1986
41	Judy Seeberger	DFL	Afton	2022
42	Bonnie Westlin	DFL	Plymouth	2022
43	Mike Freiberg	DFL	Golden Valley	2026
44	Sam Rosemark	DFL	Oakdale	2026
45	Ann Johnson Stewart	DFL	Wayzata	2024
46	Ron Latz	DFL	St. Louis Park	2006
47	Amanda Hemmingsen-Jaeger	DFL	Woodbury	2025
48	Julia Coleman	Republican	Chanhassen	2020
49	Krish Subrahmanian	DFL	Eden Prairie	2026
50	Karla Hult	DFL	Edina	2026
51	Simon Trautmann Cordova	DFL	Richfield	2026
52	Liz Reyer	DFL	Eagan	2026
53	Paul Cumings	DFL	South St. Paul	2026
54	Rick Olson	DFL	Prior Lake	2026
55	Lindsey Port	DFL	Burnsville	2020
56	Erin Maye Quade	DFL	Apple Valley	2022
57	Zach Duckworth	Republican	Lakeville	2020
58	Mark Legvold	DFL	Northfield	2026
59	Bobby Joe Champion	DFL	Minneapolis	2012
60	Doron Clark	DFL	Minneapolis	2025
61	Scott Dibble	DFL	Minneapolis	2002
62	Omar Fateh	DFL	Minneapolis	2020
63	Zaynab Mohamed	DFL	Minneapolis	2022
64	Erin Murphy	DFL	Saint Paul	2020
65	Robyn Gulley	DFL	West St. Paul	2026
66	Clare Oumou Verbeten	DFL	Saint Paul	2022
67	Foung Hawj	DFL	Saint Paul	2012

=== House of Representatives ===
District		Name	Party	Residence	First elected
1	A	John Burkel	Republican	Badger	2020
1	B	Steve Gander	Republican	East Grand Forks	2024
2	A	Bidal Duran Jr.	Republican	Bemidji	2024
2	B	Matt Bliss	Republican	Pennington	2016
3	A	Roger Skraba	Republican	Ely	2022
3	B	Aaron Schweiger	DFL	Hermantown	2026
4	A	Erika Yoney	DFL	Moorhead	2026
4	B	Jim Joy	Republican	Hawley	2022
5	A	Krista Knudsen	Republican	Lake Shore	2022
5	B	Jonathan Claussen	Republican	Staples	2026
6	A	Ben Davis	Republican	Merrifield	2022
6	B	Josh Heintzeman	Republican	Nisswa	2014
7	A	Spencer Igo	Republican	Grand Rapids	2020
7	B	Cal Warwas	Republican	Eveleth	2024
8	A	Peter Johnson	DFL	Duluth	2024
8	B	Liish Kozlowski	DFL	Duluth	2022
9	A	Jeff Backer	Republican	Browns Valley	2014
9	B	Tom Murphy	Republican	Underwood	2022
10	A	Mark Streimer	Republican	Brainerd	2026
10	B	Isaac Schultz	Republican	Elmdale Township	2022
11	A	Chris Swanson	DFL	Cloquet	2026
11	B	Nathan Nelson	Republican	Hinckley	2019 (Note: Elected in a special election.)
12	A	Paul Anderson	Republican	Starbuck	2008
12	B	Mary Franson	Republican	Alexandria	2010
13	A	Tanja Goering	Republican	Richmond	2026
13	B	Dawn Loberg	Republican	Sartell	2026
14	A	Abdi Daisane	DFL	Saint Cloud	2026
14	B	Zach Dorholt	DFL	Saint Cloud	2012 (Note: Served one term, 2013-2015, then elected again in 2026)
15	A	Brad Hennen	Republican	near Ghent	2026
15	B	Geri Theis	Republican	Redwood Falls	2026
16	A	Scott Van Binsbergen	Republican	Montevideo	2024
16	B	Dave Baker	Republican	Willmar	2014
17	A	Dawn Gillman	Republican	Dassel	2022
17	B	Bobbie Harder	Republican	Henderson	2022
18	A	Leah Hanson	DFL	North Mankato	2026
18	B	Luke Frederick	DFL	Mankato	2020
19	A	Keith Allen	Republican	Kenyon	2024
19	B	Thomas Sexton	Republican	Waseca	2024
20	A	Pam Altendorf	Republican	Red Wing	2022
20	B	Sara Bertschinger	Republican	near Pine Island	2026
21	A	Krist Wollum	Republican	near Porter	2026
21	B	Marj Fogelman	Republican	Fulda	2022
22	A	Bjorn Olson	Republican	Elmore	2020
22	B	Terry Stier	Republican	Belle Plaine	2024
23	A	Nick Ronnenberg	Republican	Albert Lea	2026
23	B	Patricia Mueller	Republican	Austin	2020
24	A	Duane Quam	Republican	Byron	2010
24	B	Tina Liebling	DFL	Rochester	2004
25	A	Kim Hicks	DFL	Rochester	2022
25	B	Andy Smith	DFL	Rochester	2022
26	A	Dan Wilson	DFL	Winona	2026
26	B	Greg Davids	Republican	Preston	1991 (Note: Elected in a special election. Lost re-election in 2006. Elected again in 2008.)
27	A	Shane Mekeland	Republican	Clear Lake	2018
27	B	Bryan Lawrence	Republican	Princeton	2024
28	A	Jimmy Gordon	Republican	Isanti	2024
28	B	Max Rymer	Republican	North Branch	2024
29	A	Joe McDonald	Republican	Delano	2010
29	B	Marion O'Neill	Republican	Maple Lake	2012
30	A	Walter Hudson	Republican	Albertville	2022
30	B	Chad Westberg	Republican	Elk River	2026
31	A	Harry Niska	Republican	Ramsey	2022
31	B	Peggy Scott	Republican	Andover	2008
32	A	Nolan West	Republican	Blaine	2016
32	B	Matt Norris	DFL	Blaine	2022
33	A	Stacey Stout	Republican	Mahtomedi	2026
33	B	Josiah Hill	DFL	Stillwater	2022
34	A	Jason Heaser	DFL	Champlin	2026
34	B	Xp Lee	DFL	Brooklyn Park	2025
35	A	Zack Stephenson	DFL	Coon Rapids	2018
35	B	Kari Rehrauer	DFL	Coon Rapids	2024
36	A	Jim DeMay	DFL	North Oaks	2026
36	B	Brion Curran	DFL	Vadnais Heights	2022
37	A	Tom McKee	Republican	Corcoran	2026
37	B	Kristin Bahner	DFL	Maple Grove	2018
38	A	Huldah Hiltsley	DFL	Brooklyn Park	2024
38	B	Samantha Vang	DFL	Brooklyn Center	2018
39	A	Aaron Klemz	DFL	Fridley	2026
39	B	Amáda Márquez Simula	DFL	Columbia Heights	2026
40	A	Aisha Elmquist	DFL	Arden Hills	2026
40	B	David Gottfried	DFL	Shoreview	2025
41	A	Cole Birkeland	DFL	Lake Elmo	2026
41	B	Jen Fox	DFL	Hastings	2026
42	A	Ned Carroll	DFL	Plymouth	2022
42	B	Ginny Klevorn	DFL	Plymouth	2018
43	A	Kyrstin Schuette	DFL	Crystal	2026
43	B	Jess Lewis	DFL	Golden Valley	2026
44	A	Peter Fischer	DFL	Maplewood	2012
44	B	Leon Lillie	DFL	North St. Paul	2004
45	A	Andrew Myers	Republican	Minnetonka Beach	2022
45	B	Patty Acomb	DFL	Minnetonka	2018
46	A	Larry Kraft	DFL	St. Louis Park	2022
46	B	Cheryl Youakim	DFL	Hopkins	2014
47	A	Shelley Buck	DFL	Woodbury	2026
47	B	Ethan Cha	DFL	Woodbury	2022
48	A	Jim Nash	Republican	Waconia	2014
48	B	Lucy Rehm	DFL	Chanhassen	2022
49	A	Alex Falconer	DFL	Eden Prairie	2016
49	B	Carlie Kotyza-Witthuhn	DFL	Eden Prairie	2018
50	A	Julie Greene	DFL	Edina	2024
50	B	Steve Elkins	DFL	Bloomington	2018
51	A	Michael Howard	DFL	Richfield	2018
51	B	Nathan Coulter	DFL	Bloomington	2022
52	A	Christos Jensen	DFL	Eagan	2026
52	B	Bianca Virnig	DFL	Eagan	2023
53	A	Mary Frances Clardy	DFL	Inver Grove Heights	2022
53	B	Rick Hansen	DFL	South St. Paul	2004
54	A	Brad Tabke	DFL	Shakopee	2018
54	B	Natalie Barnes	Republican	Prior Lake	2026
55	A	Jessica Hanson	DFL	Burnsville	2020
55	B	Hunter Cantrell	DFL	Burnsville	2018 (Note: served one term from 2019-2021, elected again in 2026).)
56	A	Robert Bierman	DFL	Apple Valley	2018
56	B	John Huot	DFL	Rosemount	2018
57	A	Jon Koznick	Republican	Lakeville	2014
57	B	Brian Cohn	DFL	Lakeville	2026
58	A	Kristi Pursell	DFL	Northfield	2022
58	B	Drew Roach	Republican	Farmington	2024
59	A	Fue Lee	DFL	Minneapolis	2016
59	B	Esther Agbaje	DFL	Minneapolis	2020
60	A	Sydney Jordan	DFL	Minneapolis	2020
60	B	Mohamud Noor	DFL	Minneapolis	2018
61	A	Katie Jones	DFL	Minneapolis	2024
61	B	Jamie Long	DFL	Minneapolis	2018
62	A	Anquam Mahamoud	DFL	Minneapolis	2024
62	B	Aisha Gomez	DFL	Minneapolis	2018
63	A	Samantha Sencer-Mura	DFL	Minneapolis	2022
63	B	Emma Greenman	DFL	Minneapolis	2020
64	A	Meg Luger-Nikolai	DFL	Saint Paul	2026
64	B	Dave Pinto	DFL	Saint Paul	2014
65	A	Samakab Hussein	DFL	Saint Paul	2022
65	B	Sebastian Ellefson	DFL	Saint Paul	2026
66	A	Leigh Finke	DFL	Saint Paul	2022
66	B	Athena Hollins	DFL	Saint Paul	2020
67	A	Liz Lee	DFL	Saint Paul	2022
67	B	Jay Xiong	DFL	Saint Paul	2018

== Committees ==
=== Senate committees ===
Minnesota Senate committees
Committee	Chair	Vice chair	Ranking Minority Member
Agriculture, Veterans, and Higher Education	Aric Putnam		
Division on Veterans	Aric Putnam		
Division on Higher Education	Clare Oumou Verbeten		
Capital Investment	John Hoffman		
Children, Youth and Families	Erin Maye Quade		
Commerce	Judy Seeberger		
Education	Mary Kunesh		
Elections	Bonnie Westlin		
Energy and Utilities	Nick Frentz		
Environment, Climate, and Legacy	Foung Hawj		
Division on Legacy	Susan Pha		
Finance	John Marty		
Health Care	Liz Boldon		
Consumer Protection, Health Care Affordability and Insurance	Lindsey Port		
Human Services	Zaynab Mohamed		
Jobs and Economic Development	Bobby Joe Champion		
Judiciary and Public Safety	Ron Latz		
Labor and Worker Protection	Jen McEwen		
Local Government and Housing	Omar Fateh		
Rules and Administration	Erin Murphy		
State Government and Technology	Heather Gustafson		
Taxes	Scott Dibble		
Division on Property Taxes	Grant Hauschild		
Transportation	Ann Johnson Stewart		
Source: Minnesota Senate DFL

=== House committees ===
Minnesota Senate committees
Committee	Chair	Ranking Minority Member
Agriculture Finance and Policy	Rick Hansen	
Capital Investment	Cheryl Youakim	
Children & Families Finance and Policy	Carlie Kotyza-Witthuhn	
Climate & Energy Finance and Policy	Patty Acomb	
Commerce Finance and Policy	Steve Elkins	
Education Finance	Sydney Jordan	
Education Policy	Mary Frances Clardy	
Elections Finance & Local Government	Kristin Bahner	
Environment & Natural Resources Finance and Policy	Peter Fischer	
Ethics	Ginny Klevorn	
Fraud Prevention & Consumer Protection	Emma Greenman	
Health Finance and Policy	Robert Bierman	
Higher Education Finance and Policy	Jessica Hanson	
Housing Finance and Policy	Michael Howard	
Human Services Finance	Mohamud Noor	
Human Services Policy Division	Kim Hicks	
Preventing Homelessness Division	Liish Kozlowski	
Judiciary Finance & Civil Law	Tina Liebling	
Data Practices, Privacy, & Human Rights Division	Leigh Finke	
Labor & Industry Finance and Policy	Leon Lillie	
Legacy Finance	Samantha Vang	
Legislative Commission on Pensions & Retirement	Luke Frederick	
Pollution & Waste Reduction Finance and Policy	Athena Hollins	
Public Safety Finance and Policy	Dave Pinto	
Rules & Legislative Administration	Jamie Long	
State Government Finance and Policy	Ginny Klevorn	
Taxes	Aisha Gomez	
Property Tax Division	Matt Norris	
Technology Policy	Larry Kraft	
Transportation Finance and Policy	Brad Tabke	
Veterans & Military Affairs Finance and Policy	John Huot	
Ways & Means	Fue Lee	
Federal Impacts Division	Esther Agbaje	
Workforce & Economic Development Finance and Policy	Jay Xiong	
Source: Session Daily
