= 2018 Minnesota House of Representatives election =

2018 Minnesota House of Representatives Elections
- November 6, 2018

All 134 seats in the Minnesota House of Representatives 68 seats needed for a majority
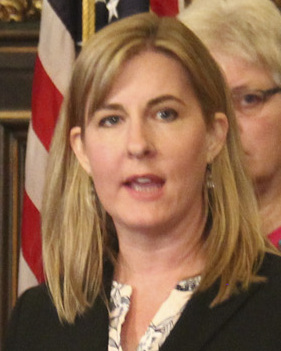

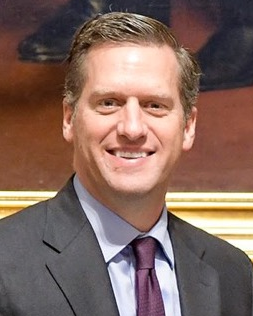
	Majority party	Minority party
Leader	Melissa Hortman	Kurt Daudt
Party	Democratic (DFL)	Republican
Leader since	January 3, 2017	January 8, 2013
Leader's seat	36B–Brooklyn Park	31A–Crown
Last election	57 seats, 49.11%	77 seats, 50.34%
Seats before	57 (Note: Including 2 vacant seats previously held by the DFL.)	77 (Note: Including 1 vacant seat previously held by the Republicans.)
Seats won	75	59
Seat change	▲18	▼18
Popular vote	1,388,938	1,151,135
Percentage	54.40%	45.09%
Swing	▲5.29 pp	▼5.25 pp
Speaker before election
Kurt Daudt
Republican
Elected Speaker
Melissa Hortman
Democratic (DFL)

The 2018 Minnesota House of Representatives election was held in the U.S. state of Minnesota on November 6, 2018, to elect members to the House of Representatives of the 91st Minnesota Legislature. A primary election was held in several districts on August 14, 2018. The election coincided with the 2018 Minnesota gubernatorial election for governor, a special election for the Minnesota Senate, and other elections.

The Minnesota Democratic–Farmer–Labor Party (DFL) won a majority of seats, ending the Republican majority that began with the 2014 Minnesota House of Representatives election. The new legislature convened on January 8, 2019.

== Background ==
The last election resulted in the Republicans winning a majority of 76 seats, increasing the majority of 72 seats it won in 2014. It was the first time that a party has retained control of the House of Representatives since the DFL in the 2008 Minnesota House of Representatives election. In conjunction with the result of the Senate election, it also resulted in the return of all-Republican control of the Legislature since 2012—only the second time the Republicans have held control of both houses since the return of partisan elections to the House in 1974 and the Senate in 1976 and marking the end of two years of split control between a Republican-held House and a DFL-held Senate.

A special election was held for District 32B on February 14, 2017, following the invalidation of its general election results. On September 8, 2016, the Minnesota Supreme Court found Republican incumbent Bob Barrett ineligible for election because he did not reside in his district. As the ruling occurred within 80 days of the general election, Barrett's name could not be replaced on the ballot. Republican Anne Neu won the special election, increasing the Republican majority to 77 seats.

== Electoral system ==
The 134 members of the House of Representatives were elected from single-member districts by first-past-the-post voting to two-year terms. Contested nominations of the DFL and Republican parties for each district were determined by an open primary election. Minor-party and independent candidates were nominated by petition. Write-in candidates had to file a request with the secretary of state's office for votes for them to be counted. The filing period was from May 22 through June 5, 2018.

== Retiring members ==
Retiring incumbents (light red and light blue) by district

=== Republican ===
- Matt Dean, 38B
- Joe Hoppe, 47B
- Jeff Howe, 13A: To seek election to be District 13's senator in the Minnesota Senate.
- Jim Newberger, 15B: To seek election to be Minnesota's Class 1 U.S. senator.
- Joyce Peppin, 34A: Resigned effective July 2, 2018, to join the Minnesota Rural Electric Association as director of government affairs and general counsel.
- Mark Uglem, 36A
- Abigail Whelan, 35A

=== DFL ===
- Susan Allen, 62B
- Jon Applebaum, 44B
- David Bly, 20B
- Karen Clark, 62A
- Peggy Flanagan, 46A: To seek election to be lieutenant governor as Tim Walz's running mate.
- Debra Hilstrom, 40B: To seek election to be attorney general.
- Clark Johnson, 19A
- Sheldon Johnson, 67B
- Erin Maye Quade, 57A: To seek election to be lieutenant governor as Erin Murphy's running mate.
- Jason Metsa, 6B: To seek election to be Minnesota's 8th congressional district representative.
- Erin Murphy, 64A: To seek election to be governor.
- Ilhan Omar, 60B: To seek election to be Minnesota's 5th congressional district representative.
- Paul Rosenthal, 49B: Resigned effective September 5, 2018, to become the director of external affairs for Western Governors University.
- Linda Slocum, 50A
- Paul Thissen, 61B: Resigned effective April 20, 2018, to become a justice of the Minnesota Supreme Court.
- JoAnn Ward, 53A

== Predictions ==
Source	Ranking	As of
Governing	Lean R	October 8, 2018

=== Competitive districts ===
MinnPost and MPR News considered a total of 18 House districts competitive in 2018, based on past election results, campaign spending trends, and conversations with campaigns. MinnPost considered 15 districts competitive, 11 of which were held by the Republicans and four by the DFL. According to MinnPost, their list was not exhaustive and could have spoken to broader trends in the election. MPR News also considered 15 districts competitive, 12 of which were held by the Republicans and three by the DFL.

District	Incumbent	Party	First elected	2016 result	MinnPost (October 18, 2018)	MPR News (November 1, 2018)	Result
4B	Paul Marquart	DFL	2000	53.85%	Yes	No	Hold
5B	Sandy Layman	Republican	2016	53.61%	Yes	No	Hold
19A	Clark Johnson (Note: Retired; did not seek re-election.)	DFL	2013 (Note: Elected in a special election.)	52.68%	Yes	Yes	Hold
34B	Dennis Smith	Republican	2014	55.83%	No	Yes	DFL gain
36A	Mark Uglem	Republican	2012	58.21%	Yes	Yes	DFL gain
37A	Erin Koegel	DFL	2016	47.17%	Yes	Yes	Hold
38B	Matt Dean	Republican	2004	56.94%	Yes	Yes	DFL gain
42A	Randy Jessup	Republican	2016	50.18%	Yes	Yes	DFL gain
44A	Sarah Anderson	Republican	2006	54.04%	Yes	Yes	DFL gain
47B	Joe Hoppe	Republican	2002	62.47%	Yes	No	Hold
49A	Dario Anselmo	Republican	2016	51.04%	Yes	Yes	DFL gain
52B	Regina Barr	Republican	2016	50.17%	Yes	Yes	DFL gain
53B	Kelly Fenton	Republican	2014	56.35%	No	Yes	DFL gain
54A	Keith Franke	Republican	2016	51.43%	Yes	Yes	DFL gain
55A	Bob Loonan (Note: Lost primary election for party's nomination.)	Republican	2014	55.78%	Yes	Yes	DFL gain
56B	Roz Peterson	Republican	2014	52.37%	Yes	Yes	DFL gain
57A	Erin Maye Quade	DFL	2016	52.23%	Yes	Yes	Hold
57B	Anna Wills	Republican	2012	53.66%	No	Yes	DFL gain

== Primary elections results ==
A primary election was held in 21 districts to nominate Republican and DFL candidates. Eight Republican nominations and 14 DFL nominations were contested. Seven incumbents were opposed for their party's nomination. Notably, District 55A Republican incumbent Bob Loonan lost his party's nomination.

District	Party	Candidates	Votes	%
6B	Republican	Skeeter Tomczak	2,402	100.00
6B	DFL	Dave Lislegard	4,243	68.20
6B	DFL	Shaun Hainey	1,978	31.80
15B	Republican	Shane Mekeland	2,258	100.00
15B	DFL	Karla Scapanski	1,166	66.33
15B	DFL	Jessica Filiaggi	592	33.67
18A	Republican	Dean Urdahl	2,534	100.00
18A	DFL	Justin Vold	1,065	61.60
18A	DFL	Robert Wright	664	38.40
22A	Republican	Joe Schomacker	3,275	100.00
22A	DFL	Maxwell Kaufman	1,331	53.82
22A	DFL	Brian Abrahamson	1,142	46.18
24A	Republican	John Petersburg	2,111	100.00
24A	DFL	Joe Heegard	1,727	78.68
24A	DFL	Ethan Cords	468	21.32
26A	Republican	Paul Wilson	1,624	100.00
26A	DFL	Tina Liebling	3,555	89.93
26A	DFL	Abdulkadir Abdalla (Note: Suspended campaign on June 22, 2018.)	398	10.07
31B	Republican	Cal Bahr	1,829	56.89
31B	Republican	Tom Hackbarth	1,386	43.11
31B	DFL	Sue Larson	1,969	100.00
34A	Republican	Kristin Robbins	2,010	59.33
34A	Republican	Brad Ganzer	1,378	40.67
34A	DFL	Dan Solon	2,444	100.00
40B	Republican	Robert Marvin	957	100.00
40B	DFL	Samantha Vang	1,705	46.65
40B	DFL	Cindy Yang	1,587	43.42
40B	DFL	Alexander Koenig	363	9.93
41B	DFL	Mary Kunesh-Podein	4,718	85.78
41B	DFL	Jeffrey Wagner	782	14.22
46B	Republican	Melissa Moore	633	60.00
46B	Republican	Bob Helland	422	40.00
46B	DFL	Cheryl Youakim	5,458	100.00
47B	Republican	Greg Boe	1,324	56.97
47B	Republican	Vincent Beaudette	1,000	43.03
47B	DFL	Donzel Leggett	2,848	100.00
53A	Republican	Andy Turonie	970	56.86
53A	Republican	Bill Dahn	736	43.14
53A	DFL	Tou Xiong	3,429	100.00
55A	Republican	Erik Mortensen	1,727	57.76
55A	Republican	Bob Loonan	1,263	42.24
55A	DFL	Brad Tabke	2,137	100.00
57A	Republican	Matt Lundin	1,948	100.00
57A	DFL	Robert Bierman	1,655	45.42
57A	DFL	Linda Garrett-Johnson	1,116	30.63
57A	DFL	Roxanne Mindeman (Note: Suspended campaign on July 31, 2018, and endorsed Robert Bierman)	507	13.91
57A	DFL	Kyle Koch	220	6.04
57A	DFL	Jake Cassidy	146	4.01
59A	Republican	Fred Statema	317	100.00
59A	DFL	Fue Lee	3,620	79.53
59A	DFL	Grace Moua	932	20.47
59B	Republican	Lacy Johnson	418	100.00
59B	DFL	Raymond Dehn	3,317	52.60
59B	DFL	Lisa Neal-Delgado	2,989	47.40
60B	Republican	Joseph Patiño	190	67.14
60B	Republican	Fadumo Taani	93	32.86
60B	DFL	Mohamud Noor	2,909	39.73
60B	DFL	Peter Wagenius	2,076	28.35
60B	DFL	Cordelia Pierson	1,287	17.58
60B	DFL	Haaris Pasha	374	5.11
60B	DFL	Joshua Preston	335	4.58
60B	DFL	Mary Mellen	257	3.51
60B	DFL	Angelo Jaramillo	84	1.15
62A	Republican	Bruce Lundeen	218	100.00
62A	DFL	Hodan Hassan	2,207	28.41
62A	DFL	Osman Ahmed	1,607	20.68
62A	DFL	Omar Fateh	1,602	20.62
62A	DFL	Margarita Ortega	1,531	19.71
62A	DFL	Jen Kader	822	10.58
62B	Republican	Ronald Peterson	196	67.82
62B	Republican	Ross Tenneson	93	32.18
62B	DFL	Aisha Gomez	7,075	100.00
66B	Republican	David Richard	519	100.00
66B	DFL	John Lesch	3,287	75.15
66B	DFL	Trahern Crews	1,087	24.85
Source: Minnesota Secretary of State

== Results ==
Districts won

Party	Candidates	Votes			Seats		
Party	Candidates	No.	%	+/−	No.	+/−	%
Minnesota Democratic–Farmer–Labor Party	134	1,388,938	54.40	+5.29	75	+18	55.97
Republican Party of Minnesota	131	1,151,135	45.09	−5.25	59	−18	44.03
Libertarian Party of Minnesota	2	1,067	0.04	−0.05	0	0	0.00
Independent	3	8,184	0.32	+0.13	0	0	0.00
Write-in	N/A	3,925	0.15	−0.09	0	0	0.00
Total		2,553,249	100.00	±0.00	134	±0	100.00
Invalid/blank votes		58,116	2.23	−4.03			
Turnout (out of 4,064,389 eligible voters)		2,611,365	64.25	−10.47			
Source: Minnesota Secretary of State

Popular vote
DFL	54.40%
Republican	45.09%
Other	0.51%

House seats
DFL	55.97%
Republican	44.03%

=== District results ===
District	Incumbent			Candidates				
District	Name	Party	First elected	Name	Party	Votes	%	Winner Party
1A	Dan Fabian	Republican	2010	Dan Fabian	Republican	11,762	71.14	Republican
1A	Dan Fabian	Republican	2010	Stephen Moeller	DFL	4,768	28.84	Republican
1B	Deb Kiel	Republican	2010	Deb Kiel	Republican	10,026	65.94	Republican
1B	Deb Kiel	Republican	2010	Brent Lindstrom	DFL	5,173	34.02	Republican
2A	Matt Grossell	Republican	2016	Matt Grossell	Republican	10,066	59.78	Republican
2A	Matt Grossell	Republican	2016	Michael Northbird	DFL	6,765	40.18	Republican
2B	Steve Green	Republican	2012	Steve Green	Republican	10,443	61.05	Republican
2B	Steve Green	Republican	2012	Karen Branden	DFL	6,655	38.90	Republican
3A	Rob Ecklund	DFL	2015	Rob Ecklund	DFL	11,783	59.42	DFL
3A	Rob Ecklund	DFL	2015	Randy Goutermont	Republican	8,022	40.45	DFL
3B	Mary Murphy	DFL	1976	Mary Murphy	DFL	12,282	60.03	DFL
3B	Mary Murphy	DFL	1976	Keith MacDonald	Republican	8,162	39.89	DFL
4A	Ben Lien	DFL	2012	Ben Lien	DFL	10,335	65.45	DFL
4A	Ben Lien	DFL	2012	Jordan Idso	Republican	5,449	34.51	DFL
4B	Paul Marquart	DFL	2000	Paul Marquart	DFL	10,461	58.93	DFL
4B	Paul Marquart	DFL	2000	Jason Peterson	Republican	7,285	41.04	DFL
5A	Matt Bliss	Republican	2016	John Persell	DFL	8,454	50.01	DFL
5A	Matt Bliss	Republican	2016	Matt Bliss	Republican	8,443	49.95	DFL
5B	Sandy Layman	Republican	2016	Sandy Layman	Republican	10,108	51.98	Republican
5B	Sandy Layman	Republican	2016	Pat Medure	DFL	9,305	47.85	Republican
6A	Julie Sandstede	DFL	2016	Julie Sandstede	DFL	11,055	62.02	DFL
6A	Julie Sandstede	DFL	2016	Guy Anderson	Republican	6,746	37.85	DFL
6B	Jason Metsa	DFL	2012	Dave Lislegard	DFL	12,075	61.97	DFL
6B	Jason Metsa	DFL	2012	Skeeter Tomczak	Republican	7,379	37.87	DFL
7A	Jennifer Schultz	DFL	2014	Jennifer Schultz	DFL	15,300	73.67	DFL
7A	Jennifer Schultz	DFL	2014	Dana Krivogorsky	Republican	5,439	26.19	DFL
7B	Liz Olson	DFL	2016	Liz Olson	DFL	12,739	71.84	DFL
7B	Liz Olson	DFL	2016	Caroline Burley	Republican	4,965	28.00	DFL
8A	Bud Nornes	Republican	1996	Bud Nornes	Republican	11,331	59.77	Republican
8A	Bud Nornes	Republican	1996	Brittney Johnson	DFL	7,625	40.22	Republican
8B	Mary Franson	Republican	2010	Mary Franson	Republican	11,831	62.04	Republican
8B	Mary Franson	Republican	2010	Gail Kulp	DFL	7,231	37.92	Republican
9A	John Poston	Republican	2016	John Poston	Republican	11,376	69.34	Republican
9A	John Poston	Republican	2016	Alex Hering	DFL	5,021	30.60	Republican
9B	Ron Kresha	Republican	2012	Ron Kresha	Republican	11,802	72.16	Republican
9B	Ron Kresha	Republican	2012	Stephen Browning	DFL	4,548	27.81	Republican
10A	Josh Heintzeman	Republican	2014	Josh Heintzeman	Republican	11,907	62.23	Republican
10A	Josh Heintzeman	Republican	2014	Dale Menk	DFL	7,211	37.69	Republican
10B	Dale Lueck	Republican	2014	Dale Lueck	Republican	13,131	65.59	Republican
10B	Dale Lueck	Republican	2014	Phil Yetzer	DFL	6,876	34.35	Republican
11A	Mike Sundin	DFL	2012	Mike Sundin	DFL	10,532	58.30	DFL
11A	Mike Sundin	DFL	2012	Jeff Dotseth	Republican	7,518	41.62	DFL
11B	Jason Rarick	Republican	2014	Jason Rarick	Republican	9,147	59.68	Republican
11B	Jason Rarick	Republican	2014	Tim Burkhardt	DFL	6,166	40.23	Republican
12A	Jeff Backer	Republican	2014	Jeff Backer	Republican	11,382	62.02	Republican
12A	Jeff Backer	Republican	2014	Murray Smart	DFL	6,959	37.92	Republican
12B	Paul Anderson	Republican	2008	Paul Anderson	Republican	12,219	71.33	Republican
12B	Paul Anderson	Republican	2008	Ben Schirmers	DFL	4,894	28.57	Republican
13A	Jeff Howe	Republican	2012	Lisa Demuth	Republican	11,348	61.01	Republican
13A	Jeff Howe	Republican	2012	Jim Read	DFL	7,243	38.94	Republican
13B	Tim O'Driscoll	Republican	2010	Tim O'Driscoll	Republican	12,146	64.32	Republican
13B	Tim O'Driscoll	Republican	2010	Heidi Everett	DFL	6,731	35.65	Republican
14A	Tama Theis	Republican	2013	Tama Theis	Republican	9,079	52.09	Republican
14A	Tama Theis	Republican	2013	Aric Putnam	DFL	8,348	47.89	Republican
14B	Jim Knoblach	Republican	1994 (Note: Did not seek re-election in 2006. Elected again in 2014.)	Dan Wolgamott	DFL	7,950	58.07	DFL
14B	Jim Knoblach	Republican	1994	Jim Knoblach (Note: Suspended campaign on September 21, 2018, following allegations of inappropriate behavior.)	Republican	5,705	41.67	DFL
15A	Sondra Erickson	Republican	1998 (Note: Elected in a special election. Lost re-election in 2008. Elected again in 2010.)	Sondra Erickson	Republican	10,495	64.28	Republican
15A	Sondra Erickson	Republican	1998	Emy Minzel	DFL	5,808	35.58	Republican
15B	Jim Newberger	Republican	2012	Shane Mekeland	Republican	10,699	59.41	Republican
15B	Jim Newberger	Republican	2012	Karla Scapanski	DFL	6,161	34.21	Republican
15B	Jim Newberger	Republican	2012	Myron Wilson	Independent	1,137	6.31	Republican
16A	Chris Swedzinski	Republican	2010	Chris Swedzinski	Republican	10,854	67.56	Republican
16A	Chris Swedzinski	Republican	2010	Tom Wyatt-Yerka	DFL	5,198	32.36	Republican
16B	Paul Torkelson	Republican	2008	Paul Torkelson	Republican	10,772	63.20	Republican
16B	Paul Torkelson	Republican	2008	Mindy Kimmel	DFL	6,268	36.77	Republican
17A	Tim Miller	Republican	2014	Tim Miller	Republican	10,069	60.21	Republican
17A	Tim Miller	Republican	2014	Lyle Koenen	DFL	6,645	39.73	Republican
17B	Dave Baker	Republican	2014	Dave Baker	Republican	11,908	69.11	Republican
17B	Dave Baker	Republican	2014	Anita Flowe	DFL	5,311	30.82	Republican
18A	Dean Urdahl	Republican	2002	Dean Urdahl	Republican	11,884	69.19	Republican
18A	Dean Urdahl	Republican	2002	Justin Vold	DFL	4,269	24.85	Republican
18A	Dean Urdahl	Republican	2002	Kyle Greene	Independent	650	3.78	Republican
18A	Dean Urdahl	Republican	2002	Jill Galvan	Libertarian	363	2.11	Republican
18B	Glenn Gruenhagen	Republican	2010	Glenn Gruenhagen	Republican	10,843	66.66	Republican
18B	Glenn Gruenhagen	Republican	2010	Ashley Latzke	DFL	5,403	33.22	Republican
19A	Clark Johnson	DFL	2013	Jeff Brand	DFL	10,274	54.34	DFL
19A	Clark Johnson	DFL	2013	Kim Spears	Republican	8,603	45.50	DFL
19B	Jack Considine	DFL	2014	Jack Considine	DFL	10,392	63.40	DFL
19B	Jack Considine	DFL	2014	Joe Steck	Republican	5,978	36.47	DFL
20A	Bob Vogel	Republican	2014	Bob Vogel	Republican	11,982	63.55	Republican
20A	Bob Vogel	Republican	2014	Barbara Dröher Kline	DFL	6,858	36.37	Republican
20B	David Bly	DFL	2006 (Note: Lost re-election in 2010. Elected again in 2012.)	Todd Lippert	DFL	10,925	55.32	DFL
20B	David Bly	DFL	2006	Josh Gare	Republican	8,819	44.66	DFL
21A	Barb Haley	Republican	2016	Barb Haley	Republican	11,068	56.91	Republican
21A	Barb Haley	Republican	2016	Lori Ann Clark	DFL	8,372	43.05	Republican
21B	Steve Drazkowski	Republican	2007	Steve Drazkowski	Republican	11,511	63.43	Republican
21B	Steve Drazkowski	Republican	2007	Jonathan Isenor	DFL	6,619	36.47	Republican
22A	Joe Schomacker	Republican	2010	Joe Schomacker	Republican	10,811	66.73	Republican
22A	Joe Schomacker	Republican	2010	Maxwell Kaufman	DFL	5,377	33.19	Republican
22B	Rod Hamilton	Republican	2004	Rod Hamilton	Republican	9,756	66.87	Republican
22B	Rod Hamilton	Republican	2004	Cheniqua Johnson	DFL	4,819	33.03	Republican
23A	Bob Gunther	Republican	1995	Bob Gunther	Republican	10,497	61.26	Republican
23A	Bob Gunther	Republican	1995	Heather Klassen	DFL	6,633	38.71	Republican
23B	Jeremy Munson	Republican	2018	Jeremy Munson	Republican	10,290	60.05	Republican
23B	Jeremy Munson	Republican	2018	Jim Grabowska	DFL	6,827	39.84	Republican
24A	John Petersburg	Republican	2012	John Petersburg	Republican	10,197	60.60	Republican
24A	John Petersburg	Republican	2012	Joe Heegard	DFL	6,616	39.32	Republican
24B	Brian Daniels	Republican	2014	Brian Daniels	Republican	8,972	59.56	Republican
24B	Brian Daniels	Republican	2014	Yvette Marthaler	DFL	6,076	40.34	Republican
25A	Duane Quam	Republican	2010	Duane Quam	Republican	10,376	53.62	Republican
25A	Duane Quam	Republican	2010	Jamie Mahlberg	DFL	8,957	46.29	Republican
25B	Duane Sauke	DFL	2016	Duane Sauke	DFL	11,260	60.10	DFL
25B	Duane Sauke	DFL	2016	Kenneth Bush	Republican	7,452	39.78	DFL
26A	Tina Liebling	DFL	2004	Tina Liebling	DFL	10,429	63.21	DFL
26A	Tina Liebling	DFL	2004	Paul Wilson	Republican	6,047	36.65	DFL
26B	Nels Pierson	Republican	2014	Nels Pierson	Republican	11,784	53.69	Republican
26B	Nels Pierson	Republican	2014	Tyrel Clark	DFL	10,144	46.21	Republican
27A	Peggy Bennett	Republican	2014	Peggy Bennett	Republican	9,957	56.52	Republican
27A	Peggy Bennett	Republican	2014	Terry Gjersvik	DFL	7,651	43.43	Republican
27B	Jeanne Poppe	DFL	2004	Jeanne Poppe	DFL	8,523	57.38	DFL
27B	Jeanne Poppe	DFL	2004	Christine Green	Republican	6,319	42.54	DFL
28A	Gene Pelowski	DFL	1986	Gene Pelowski	DFL	12,587	96.61	DFL
28B	Greg Davids	Republican	1991 (Note: Elected in a special election. Lost re-election in 2006. Elected again in 2008.)	Greg Davids	Republican	10,351	55.44	Republican
28B	Greg Davids	Republican	1991	Thomas Trehus	DFL	8,308	44.49	Republican
29A	Joe McDonald	Republican	2010	Joe McDonald	Republican	13,114	67.86	Republican
29A	Joe McDonald	Republican	2010	Renée Cardarelle	DFL	6,193	32.05	Republican
29B	Marion O'Neill	Republican	2012	Marion O'Neill	Republican	10,531	62.02	Republican
29B	Marion O'Neill	Republican	2012	Sharon McGinty	DFL	6,434	37.89	Republican
30A	Nick Zerwas	Republican	2012	Nick Zerwas	Republican	11,474	64.31	Republican
30A	Nick Zerwas	Republican	2012	Sarah Hamlin	DFL	6,357	35.63	Republican
30B	Eric Lucero	Republican	2014	Eric Lucero	Republican	11,962	63.15	Republican
30B	Eric Lucero	Republican	2014	Margaret Fernandez	DFL	6,970	36.79	Republican
31A	Kurt Daudt	Republican	2010	Kurt Daudt	Republican	12,326	69.08	Republican
31A	Kurt Daudt	Republican	2010	Brad Brown	DFL	5,501	30.83	Republican
31B	Cal Bahr	Republican	2016	Cal Bahr	Republican	12,840	64.40	Republican
31B	Cal Bahr	Republican	2016	Sue Larson	DFL	7,080	35.51	Republican
32A	Brian Johnson	Republican	2012	Brian Johnson	Republican	11,351	63.47	Republican
32A	Brian Johnson	Republican	2012	Renae Berg	DFL	6,522	36.47	Republican
32B	Anne Neu	Republican	2017	Anne Neu	Republican	11,031	58.00	Republican
32B	Anne Neu	Republican	2017	Jeff Peterson	DFL	7,971	41.91	Republican
33A	Jerry Hertaus	Republican	2012	Jerry Hertaus	Republican	14,394	58.99	Republican
33A	Jerry Hertaus	Republican	2012	Norrie Thomas	DFL	9,979	40.90	Republican
33B	Cindy Pugh	Republican	2012	Kelly Morrison	DFL	11,786	50.43	DFL
33B	Cindy Pugh	Republican	2012	Cindy Pugh	Republican	11,570	49.50	DFL
34A	Vacant (Note: Republican Joyce Peppin resigned effective on July 2, 2018, to join the Minnesota Rural Electric Association as director of government affairs and general counsel.)			Kristin Robbins	Republican	12,486	56.49	Republican
34A	Vacant			Dan Solon	DFL	9,601	43.44	Republican
34B	Dennis Smith	Republican	2014	Kristin Bahner	DFL	12,194	52.79	DFL
34B	Dennis Smith	Republican	2014	Dennis Smith	Republican	10,873	47.07	DFL
35A	Abigail Whelan	Republican	2014	John Heinrich	Republican	9,764	54.45	Republican
35A	Abigail Whelan	Republican	2014	Bill Vikander	DFL	8,145	45.42	Republican
35B	Peggy Scott	Republican	2008	Peggy Scott	Republican	11,438	56.53	Republican
35B	Peggy Scott	Republican	2008	Kathryn Eckhardt	DFL	8,771	43.35	Republican
36A	Mark Uglem	Republican	2012	Zack Stephenson	DFL	9,759	52.27	DFL
36A	Mark Uglem	Republican	2012	Bill Maresh	Republican	8,878	47.55	DFL
36B	Melissa Hortman	DFL	2004	Melissa Hortman	DFL	12,514	63.05	DFL
36B	Melissa Hortman	DFL	2004	Jermain Botsio	Republican	7,302	36.79	DFL
37A	Erin Koegel	DFL	2016	Erin Koegel	DFL	9,816	56.01	DFL
37A	Erin Koegel	DFL	2016	Anthony Wilder	Republican	7,676	43.80	DFL
37B	Nolan West	Republican	2016	Nolan West	Republican	10,254	50.22	Republican
37B	Nolan West	Republican	2016	Amir Malik	DFL	10,101	49.47	Republican
38A	Linda Runbeck	Republican	1989 (Note: Elected in a special election. Did not seek re-election in 1992 in order to seek election to the Minnesota Senate. Did not seek re-election to the Senate in 2000. Elected again to the House in 2010.)	Linda Runbeck	Republican	11,371	55.13	Republican
38A	Linda Runbeck	Republican	1989	Kevin Fogarty	DFL	9,229	44.75	Republican
38B	Matt Dean	Republican	2004	Ami Wazlawik	DFL	11,573	50.81	DFL
38B	Matt Dean	Republican	2004	Pat Anderson	Republican	11,187	49.11	DFL
39A	Bob Dettmer	Republican	2006	Bob Dettmer	Republican	12,366	55.52	Republican
39A	Bob Dettmer	Republican	2006	Ann Mozey	DFL	9,881	44.36	Republican
39B	Kathy Lohmer	Republican	2010	Shelly Christensen	DFL	11,372	50.25	DFL
39B	Kathy Lohmer	Republican	2010	Kathy Lohmer	Republican	11,235	49.65	DFL
40A	Mike Nelson	DFL	2002	Mike Nelson	DFL	9,387	73.12	DFL
40A	Mike Nelson	DFL	2002	David True	Republican	3,411	26.57	DFL
40B	Debra Hilstrom	DFL	2000	Samantha Vang	DFL	10,512	72.76	DFL
40B	Debra Hilstrom	DFL	2000	Robert Marvin	Republican	3,903	27.02	DFL
41A	Connie Bernardy	DFL	2000 (Note: Did not seek re-election in 2006. Elected again in 2012.)	Connie Bernardy	DFL	11,967	64.82	DFL
41A	Connie Bernardy	DFL	2000	Susan Erickson	Republican	6,453	34.95	DFL
41B	Mary Kunesh-Podein	DFL	2016	Mary Kunesh-Podein	DFL	12,408	65.77	DFL
41B	Mary Kunesh-Podein	DFL	2016	Tim Utz	Independent	6,397	33.91	DFL
42A	Randy Jessup	Republican	2016	Kelly Moller	DFL	12,289	57.52	DFL
42A	Randy Jessup	Republican	2016	Randy Jessup	Republican	9,055	42.38	DFL
42B	Jamie Becker-Finn	DFL	2016	Jamie Becker-Finn	DFL	13,042	60.35	DFL
42B	Jamie Becker-Finn	DFL	2016	Yele-Mis Yang	Republican	8,543	39.53	DFL
43A	Peter Fischer	DFL	2012	Peter Fischer	DFL	12,253	61.36	DFL
43A	Peter Fischer	DFL	2012	Bob Cardinal	Republican	7,691	38.52	DFL
43B	Leon Lillie	DFL	2004	Leon Lillie	DFL	11,253	62.31	DFL
43B	Leon Lillie	DFL	2004	Rachael Bucholz	Republican	6,788	37.59	DFL
44A	Sarah Anderson	Republican	2006	Ginny Klevorn	DFL	12,995	53.85	DFL
44A	Sarah Anderson	Republican	2006	Sarah Anderson	Republican	11,119	46.08	DFL
44B	Jon Applebaum	DFL	2014	Patty Acomb	DFL	15,082	62.74	DFL
44B	Jon Applebaum	DFL	2014	Gary Porter	Republican	8,935	37.17	DFL
45A	Lyndon Carlson	DFL	1972	Lyndon Carlson	DFL	12,347	65.35	DFL
45A	Lyndon Carlson	DFL	1972	Reid Johnson	Republican	6,520	34.51	DFL
45B	Mike Freiberg	DFL	2012	Mike Freiberg	DFL	15,727	72.44	DFL
45B	Mike Freiberg	DFL	2012	Steve Merriman	Republican	5,954	27.42	DFL
46A	Peggy Flanagan	DFL	2015	Ryan Winkler	DFL	16,692	72.50	DFL
46A	Peggy Flanagan	DFL	2015	Luke McCusker	Republican	6,297	27.35	DFL
46B	Cheryl Youakim	DFL	2014	Cheryl Youakim	DFL	16,400	75.48	DFL
46B	Cheryl Youakim	DFL	2014	Melissa Moore	Republican	5,297	24.38	DFL
47A	Jim Nash	Republican	2014	Jim Nash	Republican	14,106	64.70	Republican
47A	Jim Nash	Republican	2014	Madalynn Gerold	DFL	7,680	35.23	Republican
47B	Joe Hoppe	Republican	2002	Greg Boe	Republican	10,853	50.24	Republican
47B	Joe Hoppe	Republican	2002	Donzel Leggett	DFL	10,736	49.70	Republican
48A	Laurie Pryor	DFL	2016	Laurie Pryor	DFL	13,980	59.39	DFL
48A	Laurie Pryor	DFL	2016	Ellen Cousins	Republican	9,531	40.49	DFL
48B	Jenifer Loon	Republican	2008	Carlie Kotyza-Witthuhn	DFL	10,397	50.53	DFL
48B	Jenifer Loon	Republican	2008	Jenifer Loon	Republican	10,156	49.36	DFL
49A	Dario Anselmo	Republican	2016	Heather Edelson	DFL	14,725	58.13	DFL
49A	Dario Anselmo	Republican	2016	Dario Anselmo	Republican	10,584	41.78	DFL
49B	Vacant (Note: DFL incumbent Paul Rosenthal resigned effective on September 5, 2018, to become the director of external affairs for Western Governors University.)			Steve Elkins	DFL	15,264	61.69	DFL
49B	Vacant			Matt Sikich	Republican	9,446	38.17	DFL
50A	Linda Slocum	DFL	2006	Michael Howard	DFL	12,359	68.24	DFL
50A	Linda Slocum	DFL	2006	Kirsten Johnson	Republican	5,730	31.64	DFL
50B	Andrew Carlson	DFL	2016	Andrew Carlson	DFL	12,745	60.83	DFL
50B	Andrew Carlson	DFL	2016	Chad Anderson	Republican	8,180	39.04	DFL
51A	Sandra Masin	DFL	2006	Sandra Masin	DFL	11,875	61.43	DFL
51A	Sandra Masin	DFL	2006	Jim Kiner	Republican	7,446	38.52	DFL
51B	Laurie Halverson	DFL	2012	Laurie Halverson	DFL	13,879	62.18	DFL
51B	Laurie Halverson	DFL	2012	Doug Willetts	Republican	8,424	37.74	DFL
52A	Rick Hansen	DFL	2004	Rick Hansen	DFL	13,549	65.84	DFL
52A	Rick Hansen	DFL	2004	Beth Arntson	Republican	6,998	34.01	DFL
52B	Regina Barr	Republican	2016	Ruth Richardson	DFL	11,004	53.74	DFL
52B	Regina Barr	Republican	2016	Regina Barr	Republican	9,437	46.08	DFL
53A	JoAnn Ward	DFL	2012	Tou Xiong	DFL	11,526	61.18	DFL
53A	JoAnn Ward	DFL	2012	Andy Turonie	Republican	7,293	38.71	DFL
53B	Kelly Fenton	Republican	2014	Steve Sandell	DFL	12,261	52.29	DFL
53B	Kelly Fenton	Republican	2014	Kelly Fenton	Republican	11,169	47.63	DFL
54A	Keith Franke	Republican	2016	Anne Claflin	DFL	9,300	50.98	DFL
54A	Keith Franke	Republican	2016	Keith Franke	Republican	8,924	48.92	DFL
54B	Tony Jurgens	Republican	2016	Tony Jurgens	Republican	9,947	51.03	Republican
54B	Tony Jurgens	Republican	2016	Tina Folch	DFL	9,525	48.86	Republican
55A	Bob Loonan	Republican	2014	Brad Tabke	DFL	8,984	51.53	DFL
55A	Bob Loonan	Republican	2014	Erik Mortensen	Republican	8,382	48.07	DFL
55B	Tony Albright	Republican	2012	Tony Albright	Republican	12,968	61.16	Republican
55B	Tony Albright	Republican	2012	Matt Christensen	DFL	8,215	38.74	Republican
56A	Drew Christensen	Republican	2014	Hunter Cantrell	DFL	10,813	52.74	DFL
56A	Drew Christensen	Republican	2014	Drew Christensen	Republican	9,662	47.13	DFL
56B	Roz Peterson	Republican	2014	Alice Mann	DFL	10,035	52.64	DFL
56B	Roz Peterson	Republican	2014	Roz Peterson	Republican	9,013	47.28	DFL
57A	Erin Maye Quade	DFL	2016	Robert Bierman	DFL	12,006	54.53	DFL
57A	Erin Maye Quade	DFL	2016	Matt Lundin	Republican	9,296	42.22	DFL
57A	Erin Maye Quade	DFL	2016	Matt Swenson	Libertarian	704	3.20	DFL
57B	Anna Wills	Republican	2012	John Huot	DFL	11,209	51.92	DFL
57B	Anna Wills	Republican	2012	Anna Wills	Republican	10,373	48.04	DFL
58A	Jon Koznick	Republican	2014	Jon Koznick	Republican	11,769	55.68	Republican
58A	Jon Koznick	Republican	2014	Maggie Williams	DFL	9,354	44.25	Republican
58B	Pat Garofalo	Republican	2004	Pat Garofalo	Republican	11,549	58.84	Republican
58B	Pat Garofalo	Republican	2004	Marla Vagts	DFL	8,060	41.06	Republican
59A	Fue Lee	DFL	2016	Fue Lee	DFL	12,046	86.04	DFL
59A	Fue Lee	DFL	2016	Fred Statema	Republican	1,916	13.69	DFL
59B	Raymond Dehn	DFL	2012	Raymond Dehn	DFL	15,826	82.29	DFL
59B	Raymond Dehn	DFL	2012	Lacy Johnson	Republican	3,357	17.46	DFL
60A	Diane Loeffler	DFL	2004	Diane Loeffler	DFL	19,026	86.45	DFL
60A	Diane Loeffler	DFL	2004	Kelly Winsor	Republican	2,922	13.28	DFL
60B	Ilhan Omar	DFL	2016	Mohamud Noor	DFL	16,440	86.26	DFL
60B	Ilhan Omar	DFL	2016	Joseph Patiño	Republican	2,552	13.39	DFL
61A	Frank Hornstein	DFL	2002	Frank Hornstein	DFL	23,736	86.05	DFL
61A	Frank Hornstein	DFL	2002	Jeremy Hansen	Republican	3,814	13.83	DFL
61B	Vacant (Note: DFL incumbent Paul Thissen resigned effective on April 20, 2018, to become a justice of the Minnesota Supreme Court.)			Jamie Long	DFL	21,289	85.73	DFL
61B	Vacant			Scot Missling	Republican	3,487	14.04	DFL
62A	Karen Clark	DFL	1980	Hodan Hassan	DFL	13,107	90.39	DFL
62A	Karen Clark	DFL	1980	Bruce Lundeen	Republican	1,281	8.83	DFL
62B	Susan Allen	DFL	2012	Aisha Gomez	DFL	17,928	92.07	DFL
62B	Susan Allen	DFL	2012	Ronald Peterson	Republican	1,502	7.71	DFL
63A	Jim Davnie	DFL	2000	Jim Davnie	DFL	21,278	88.84	DFL
63A	Jim Davnie	DFL	2000	Kyle Bragg	Republican	2,631	10.98	DFL
63B	Jean Wagenius	DFL	1986	Jean Wagenius	DFL	18,403	80.83	DFL
63B	Jean Wagenius	DFL	1986	Frank Pafko	Republican	4,307	18.92	DFL
64A	Erin Murphy	DFL	2006	Kaohly Her	DFL	18,995	84.14	DFL
64A	Erin Murphy	DFL	2006	Patrick Griffin	Republican	3,532	15.64	DFL
64B	Dave Pinto	DFL	2014	Dave Pinto	DFL	19,447	80.07	DFL
64B	Dave Pinto	DFL	2014	Alex Pouliot	Republican	4,812	19.81	DFL
65A	Rena Moran	DFL	2010	Rena Moran	DFL	12,785	86.76	DFL
65A	Rena Moran	DFL	2010	Monique Giordana	Republican	1,913	12.98	DFL
65B	Carlos Mariani	DFL	1990	Carlos Mariani	DFL	14,540	81.37	DFL
65B	Carlos Mariani	DFL	1990	Margaret Mary Stokely	Republican	3,275	18.33	DFL
66A	Alice Hausman	DFL	1989	Alice Hausman	DFL	16,035	73.88	DFL
66A	Alice Hausman	DFL	1989	Jon Heyer	Republican	5,644	26.01	DFL
66B	John Lesch	DFL	2002	John Lesch	DFL	11,486	83.46	DFL
66B	John Lesch	DFL	2002	David Richard	Republican	2,227	16.18	DFL
67A	Tim Mahoney	DFL	1998	Tim Mahoney	DFL	9,557	96.41	DFL
67B	Sheldon Johnson	DFL	2000	Jay Xiong	DFL	10,235	78.10	DFL
67B	Sheldon Johnson	DFL	2000	Fred Turk	Republican	2,827	21.57	DFL

Withdrawn candidates
District	Name	Party	Note
2A	Soren Sorensen	DFL	Withdrew after losing party's endorsement.
2B	Darren Leno	DFL	Withdrew after losing party's endorsement.
5A	Reed Olson	DFL	Lost party's endorsement.
8A	Nate Gramley	Republican	Lost party's endorsement.
13A	Jeff Howe	Republican	Withdrew to seek election to the Minnesota Senate in the District 13 special election.
13B	Benjamin Carollo	DFL	Withdrew after losing party's endorsement.
15B	Lucas Knese	Republican	Lost party's endorsement.
15B	Mark Olson	Republican	Lost party's endorsement.
15B	John Ulrick	Republican	Withdrew after losing party's endorsement.
19A	Nick Pemberton	DFL	Did not file an affidavit of candidacy.
25B	Walter Smith	Republican	Withdrew after losing party's endorsement.
27A	Thomas Martinez	DFL	Withdrew after losing party's endorsement.
27A	Colin Minehart	DFL	Withdrew to focus on his business.
28B	Jordan Fontenello	DFL	Withdrew after losing party's endorsement.
29A	Janice Holter Kittok	DFL	Did not file an affidavit of candidacy.
34A	Joyce Peppin	Republican	Withdrew to join the Minnesota Rural Electric Association as director of government affairs and general counsel.
35A	Mandy Benz	Republican	Lost party's endorsement.
35A	Andre Champagne	Republican	Lost party's endorsement.
35A	John LeTourneau	Republican	Lost party's endorsement.
35A	Jill Novitzke	Republican	Lost party's endorsement.
35A	Donavon Balaski	DFL	Website and social media no longer active.
35A	Andy Hillebregt	DFL	Withdrew after losing party's endorsement.
37A	Brian McCormick	Libertarian	Did not submit a nominating petition.
37B	Brandon Taitt	DFL	Withdrew after losing party's endorsement.
38B	Lori Ahlness	Republican	Withdrew after losing party's endorsement.
38B	Ken Swecker	Republican	Withdrew after losing party's endorsement.
39B	Paula O'Loughlin	DFL	Withdrew after losing party's endorsement.
40B	Debra Hilstrom	DFL	Withdrew to seek election to be attorney general.
42A	Burt Johnson	DFL	Withdrew after losing party's endorsement.
42A	Liz Voltz	DFL	Withdrew after losing party's endorsement.
46A	Brittany Edwards	DFL	Withdrew after conceding party's endorsement.
46A	Brian Shekleton	DFL	Withdrew following Ryan Winkler's announcement that he would seek election.
47A	David Snyder	DFL	Lost party's endorsement.
47B	Joe Hoppe	Republican	Withdrew to resume full-time employment.
49A	Cheryl Barry	DFL	Withdrew after losing party's endorsement.
49A	Carolyn Jackson	DFL	Withdrew after losing party's endorsement.
49B	Paul Rosenthal	DFL	Withdrew to become the director of external affairs for Western Governors University.
51A	Ryan Fagan	DFL	Withdrew and endorsed Sandra Masin.
52B	Geoff Dittberner	DFL	Withdrew after losing party's endorsement.
53A	Greta Bjerkness	DFL	Withdrew after losing party's endorsement.
53A	Lila Eltawely	DFL	Withdrew after losing party's endorsement.
55A	Mary Hernandez	DFL	Withdrew for personal reasons.
56A	Renita Fisher	DFL	Withdrew after losing party's endorsement.
56B	Lindsey Port	DFL	Withdrew due to loss of popular support.
57A	Erin Maye Quade	DFL	Withdrew to seek election to be lieutenant governor as Erin Murphy's running mate.
60A	Anthony Hernandez	DFL	Withdrew after losing party's endorsement.
60B	Ilhan Omar	DFL	Withdrew to seek election to be Minnesota's 5th congressional district representative.
61B	Sara Freeman	DFL	Withdrew after losing party's endorsement.
61B	Tim Laughinghouse	DFL	Lost party's endorsement.
61B	Meggie Wittorf	DFL	Withdrew after losing party's endorsement.
62A	Farhio Khalif	DFL	Did not file an affidavit of candidacy.
62A	Guhaad Said	DFL	Website and social media no longer active.
62B	Korina Barry	DFL	Withdrew after losing party's endorsement.
62B	Rebecca Gagnon	DFL	Withdrew after losing party's endorsement.
62B	Bonita Jones	DFL	Withdrew after losing party's endorsement.
62B	Ben Schweigert	DFL	Withdrew after losing party's endorsement.
63B	Emily Antin	DFL	Withdrew after losing party's endorsement.
63B	Husniyah Dent Bradley	DFL	Lost party's endorsement.
63B	Leili Fatehi	DFL	Lost party's endorsement.
63B	Brenda Johnson	DFL	Did not file an affidavit of candidacy.
63B	Philip Sturm	Independent	Did not submit a nominating petition.
64A	Kayla Farhang	DFL	Withdrew for personal reasons.
64A	Amanda Karls	DFL	Lost party's endorsement.
64A	Meg Luger-Nikolai	DFL	Lost party's endorsement.
64B	Troy Sjerven	Libertarian	Did not submit a nominating petition.
66B	Alissa Harrington	DFL	Withdrew after conceding party's endorsement.
67B	John Slade	DFL	Withdrew after losing party's endorsement.
67B	Grant Stevensen	DFL	Withdrew after losing party's endorsement.
67B	Shoua Yang	DFL	Lost party's endorsement.

=== Seats changing parties ===
Seat gains and holds by party

Party	Incumbent	District	First elected	Winner	Party
Republican	Matt Bliss	5A	2016	John Persell	DFL
Republican	Jim Knoblach	14B	1994	Dan Wolgamott	DFL
Republican	Cindy Pugh	33B	2012	Kelly Morrison	DFL
Republican	Dennis Smith	34B	2014	Kristin Bahner	DFL
Republican	Mark Uglem	36A	2012	Zack Stephenson	DFL
Republican	Matt Dean	38B	2004	Ami Wazlawik	DFL
Republican	Kathy Lohmer	39B	2010	Shelly Christensen	DFL
Republican	Randy Jessup	42A	2016	Kelly Moller	DFL
Republican	Sarah Anderson	44A	2006	Ginny Klevorn	DFL
Republican	Jenifer Loon	48B	2008	Carlie Kotyza-Witthuhn	DFL
Republican	Dario Anselmo	49A	2016	Heather Edelson	DFL
Republican	Regina Barr	52B	2016	Ruth Richardson	DFL
Republican	Kelly Fenton	53B	2014	Steve Sandell	DFL
Republican	Keith Franke	54A	2016	Anne Claflin	DFL
Republican	Bob Loonan	55A	2014	Brad Tabke	DFL
Republican	Drew Christensen	56A	2014	Hunter Cantrell	DFL
Republican	Roz Peterson	56B	2014	Alice Mann	DFL
Republican	Anna Wills	57B	2012	John Huot	DFL

== Aftermath ==
On November 8, 2018, the newly elected House DFL caucus met to elect the leadership of the new House. House DFL Leader Melissa Hortman was elected speaker-designate unopposed. Ryan Winkler was elected majority leader and Liz Olson majority whip. The next day, the newly elected House Republican caucus met and elected outgoing Speaker Kurt Daudt minority leader, a position he held from 2013 to 2015.

== See also ==
- 2016 Minnesota Senate election
