= Robert Bierman (politician) =

American politician

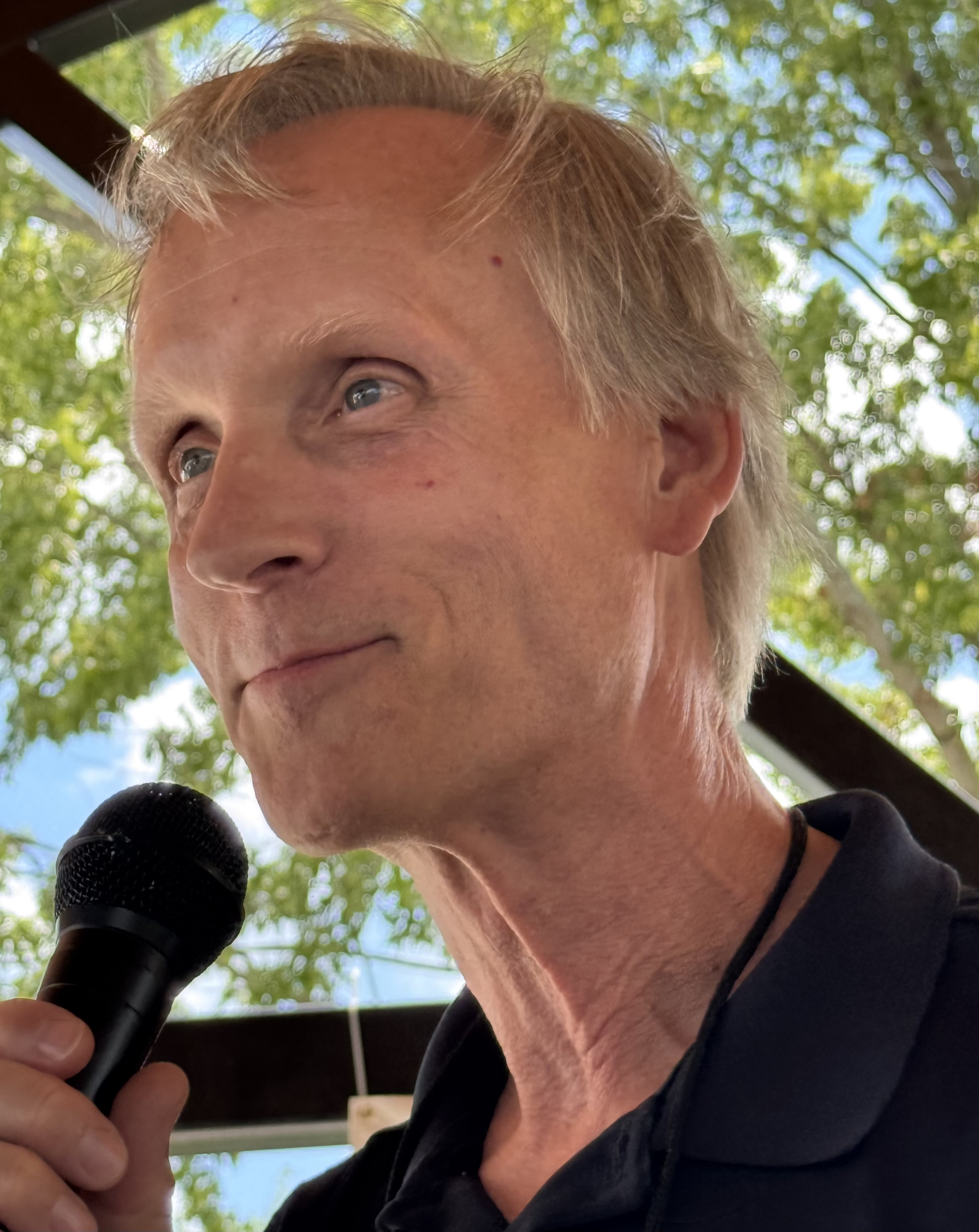

Member of the Minnesota House of Representatives from the 56A district
- Incumbent
- Assumed office January 10, 2019
- Preceded by: Erin Maye Quade

Personal details
- Born: September 29, 1960 (age 65)
- Party: Democratic (DFL)
- Spouse: Ellen
- Children: 2
- Education: University of Minnesota (B.A.)
- Occupation: Business owner
- Website: Government website Campaign website

Robert Bierman (born September 29, 1960) is an American politician serving in the Minnesota House of Representatives since 2019. A member of the Minnesota Democratic–Farmer–Labor Party (DFL), Bierman represents District 56A in the southern Twin Cities metropolitan area, which includes the city of Apple Valley and parts of Dakota County.

== Early life, education, and career ==
Bierman grew up with 11 siblings. He attended the University of Minnesota, earning a B.A. in history.

Bierman owns Bierman's Home Furnishings in Northfield, Minnesota, a business his family started over 100 years ago. He previously served as president of his local Chamber of Commerce and Rotary Club.

== Minnesota House of Representatives ==
Bierman was elected to the Minnesota House of Representatives in 2018, and has been reelected every two years since. He first ran after one-term DFL incumbent Erin Maye Quade announced she would not seek reelection to run for Lieutenant Governor of Minnesota with gubernatorial candidate Erin Murphy. Bierman earned the DFL endorsement and won a five-candidate primary election. He was sworn in on January 10, 2019, two days after the beginning of his term, as he was hospitalized for an infection. In 2020, Bierman had his election results challenged, but a judge dismissed the case for failing to state a claim and a lack of subject-matter jurisdiction.

Bierman serves as vice chair of the Health Finance and Policy Committee and sits on the Climate and Energy Finance and Policy, Commerce Finance and Policy, and Ethics Committees. From 2021 to 2022, he served as vice chair of the Preventative Health Policy Division of the Health Finance and Policy Committee.

Bierman has spoken out about the opioid epidemic, and carried legislation that would make a potential merger between the Fairview and Sanford health systems require approval from the state health commissioner before going through, citing concerns it could affect health care cost and access. He authored legislation to fund electric vehicle charging stations in state parks, paid for by fees Xcel Energy pays to the state to store nuclear energy waste, and a bill to prepare for weatherization of homes.

== Electoral history ==
2018 DFL Primary for Minnesota State House - District 57A
Party	Candidate	Votes	%
Democratic (DFL)	Robert Bierman	1,655	45.42
Democratic (DFL)	Linda Garrett-Johnson	1,116	30.63
Democratic (DFL)	Roxanne B Mindeman	507	13.91
Democratic (DFL)	Kyle Koch	220	6.04
Democratic (DFL)	Jake Cassidy	146	4.01
Total votes		3,644	100.0

2018 Minnesota State House - District 57A
Party	Candidate	Votes	%
Democratic (DFL)	Robert Bierman	12,006	54.53
Republican	Matt Lundin	9,296	42.22
Libertarian	Matthew Swenson	704	3.20
Write-in		11	0.05
Total votes		22,017	100.0
Democratic (DFL) hold			

2020 Minnesota State House - District 57A
Party	Candidate	Votes	%
Democratic (DFL)	Robert Bierman (incumbent)	15,574	55.70
Republican	Megan Olson	12,357	44.20
Write-in		28	0.10
Total votes		27,959	100.0
Democratic (DFL) hold			

2022 Minnesota State House - District 56A
Party	Candidate	Votes	%
Democratic (DFL)	Robert Bierman (incumbent)	10,786	60.02
Republican	Joe Landru	7,168	39.89
Write-in		16	0.09
Total votes		17,970	100.0
Democratic (DFL) hold			

2024 Minnesota State House - District 56A
Party	Candidate	Votes	%
Democratic (DFL)	Robert Bierman (incumbent)	13,750	61.22
Republican	Angela Zorn	8,687	38.68
Write-in		24	0.11
Total votes		22,461	100.00
Democratic (DFL) hold			

== Personal life ==
Bierman lives in Apple Valley, Minnesota, with his wife, Ellen, and has two children.
