= Bob Loonan =

American politician

Member of the Minnesota House of Representatives from the 55A district
- In office January 6, 2015 – January 7, 2019
- Preceded by: Mike Beard
- Succeeded by: Brad Tabke

Personal details
- Born: July 29, 1960 (age 66) Minnesota
- Party: Republican Party of Minnesota
- Spouse: Denise
- Children: 4
- Education: Saint John's University (B.S.)
- Occupation: Insurance agent

Bob Loonan (born July 29, 1960) is an American politician and former member of the Minnesota House of Representatives. A member of the Republican Party of Minnesota, he represented District 55A in the southwestern Twin Cities metropolitan area.

== Early life ==
Loonan attended Saint John's University, graduating with a bachelor's degree.

== Minnesota House of Representatives ==
Loonan was first elected to the Minnesota House of Representatives in 2014.

Loonan ran for re-election in 2018 but was defeated in the Republican primary by Erik Mortensen.

Loonan ran again in 2020 by lost in a rematch with Erik Mortensen in the Republican Primary

== Personal life ==
Loonan is married to his wife, Denise. They have four children and reside in Shakopee, Minnesota.
