= 1974 Minnesota House of Representatives election =

- November 5, 1974

All 134 seats in the Minnesota House of Representatives 68 seats needed for a majority
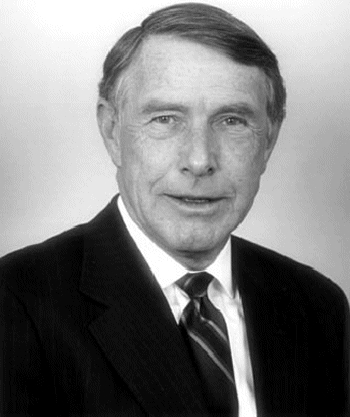
	Majority party	Minority party
		RPM
Leader	Martin Olav Sabo	Aubrey Dirlam (retired)
Party	Democratic (DFL)	Republican
Leader since	1968	1970
Leader's seat	57B–Minneapolis	21B–Redwood Falls
Seats won	104	30
Popular vote	688,590	469,448
Percentage	58.25%	39.71%
Speaker before election
Martin Olav Sabo
Democratic (DFL)
Elected Speaker
Martin Olav Sabo
Democratic (DFL)

The 1974 Minnesota House of Representatives election was held in the U.S. state of Minnesota on November 5, 1974, to elect members to the House of Representatives of the 69th Minnesota Legislature. A primary election was held on September 10, 1974. This was the first partisan election of the House since 1912.

The Minnesota Democratic–Farmer–Labor Party (DFL) won a majority of seats, followed by the Minnesota Republican Party. The new Legislature convened on January 7, 1975.

== Results ==
Summary of the November 5, 1974 Minnesota House of Representatives election results
Party	Candidates	Votes		Seats	
Party	Candidates	No.	%	No.	%
Minnesota Democratic–Farmer–Labor Party	133	688,590	58.25	104	77.61
Minnesota Republican Party	115	469,448	39.71	30	22.39
Independent	10	17,499	1.48	0	0.00
Write-in	N/A	6,563	0.56	0	0.00
Total		1,182,100	100.00	134	100.00
Invalid/blank votes		114,109	8.80		
Turnout (out of 2,617,000 eligible voters)		1,296,209	49.53	▼20.78 pp	
Source: Minnesota Secretary of State

== See also ==
- Minnesota gubernatorial election, 1974
