= Erik Mortensen =

American politician

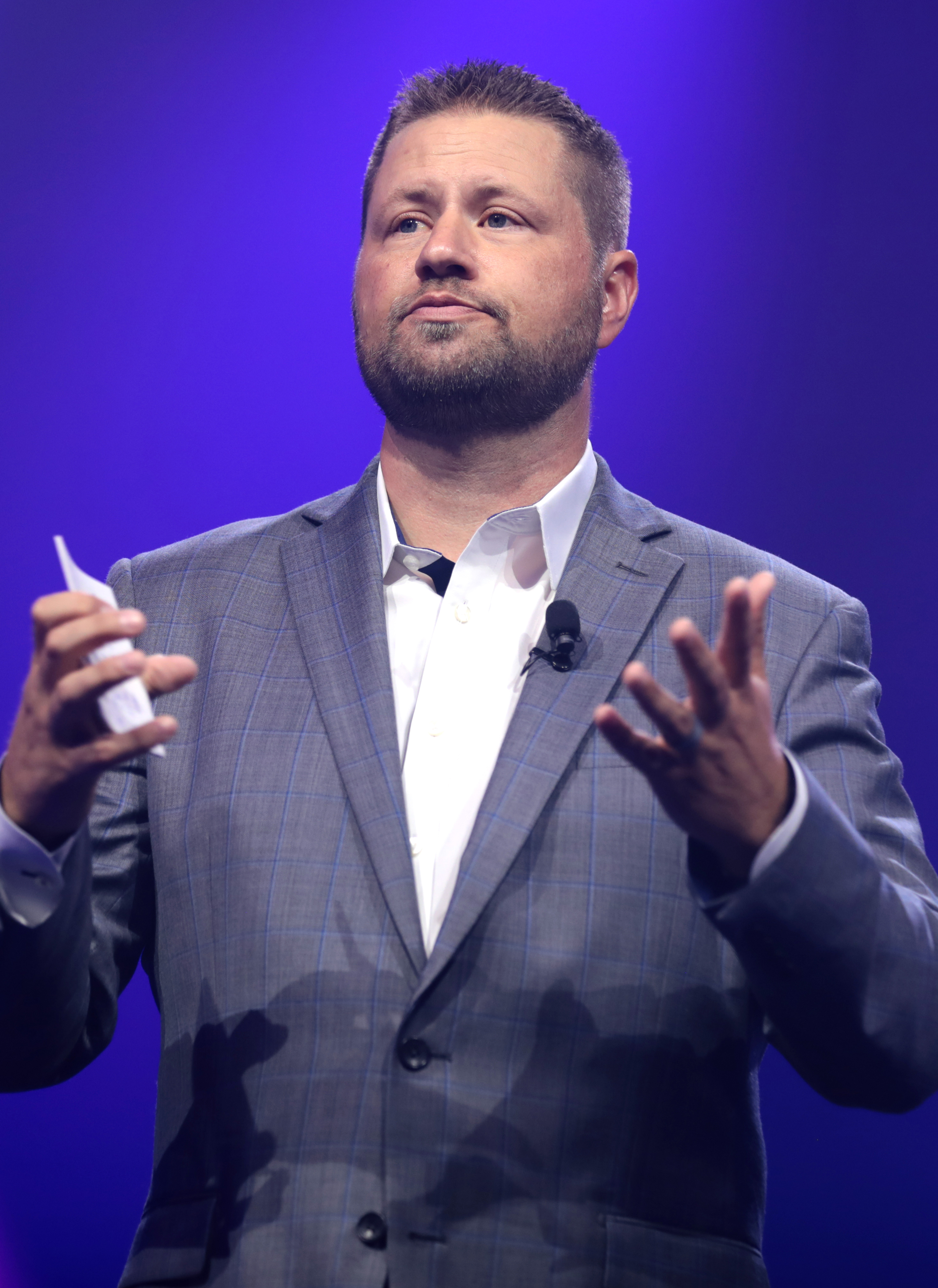
- Mortensen at 2022 Revolution hosted by Young Americans for Liberty

Member of the Minnesota House of Representatives from the 55A district
- In office January 5, 2021 – January 3, 2023
- Preceded by: Brad Tabke
- Succeeded by: Jessica Hanson

Personal details
- Born: Shakopee, Minnesota, U.S.
- Party: Republican
- Education: no post-secondary credentials

Erik Mortensen is an American politician and former member of the Minnesota House of Representatives from House District 55A. Elected in November 2020, he assumed office on January 5, 2021. Brad Tabke defeated incumbent Erik Mortensen and Ryan Martin in the general election for Minnesota House of Representatives District 54A on November 8, 2022.

== Early life and education ==
Mortensen was born and raised in Shakopee, Minnesota. He briefly attended Mesa State University and Strayer University, no degrees were awarded.

== Career ==
From 2002 to 2014, Mortensen worked in business development for C. H. Robinson. In 2009, he also started working as a park commissioner for the city of Belle Plaine, Minnesota. From 2014 to 2018, he was the president of a local AdvantaClean franchise, specializing in mold remediation and indoor air quality issues. From 2018 to 2021, he worked as a contract business consultant for Keystone Group International in St. Louis Park. Since July 2019, he has worked as the vice president of Utility Energy Systems, an equipment supplier.

=== Minnesota Legislature ===
Mortensen was elected to the Minnesota House of Representatives in November 2020 and assumed office on January 5, 2021, unseating Democrat Brad Tabke. After winning his election in November, Mortensen hosted a "freedom party" in violation of Minnesota's COVID-19 guidelines. After assuming office in 2021, Mortensen was a member of the newly formed New House Republican Caucus, though he was removed from the group in May 2021 amid disagreements with leadership. After Mortensen left the New House Republican Caucus, Minority Leader Kurt Daudt issued a short memo, stating that Mortensen would not be a member of the House GOP Caucus. In June 2021, fellow Republican David Osmek, a member of the Minnesota Senate, called Mortensen "the village idiot".
