= Zack Stephenson =

American politician

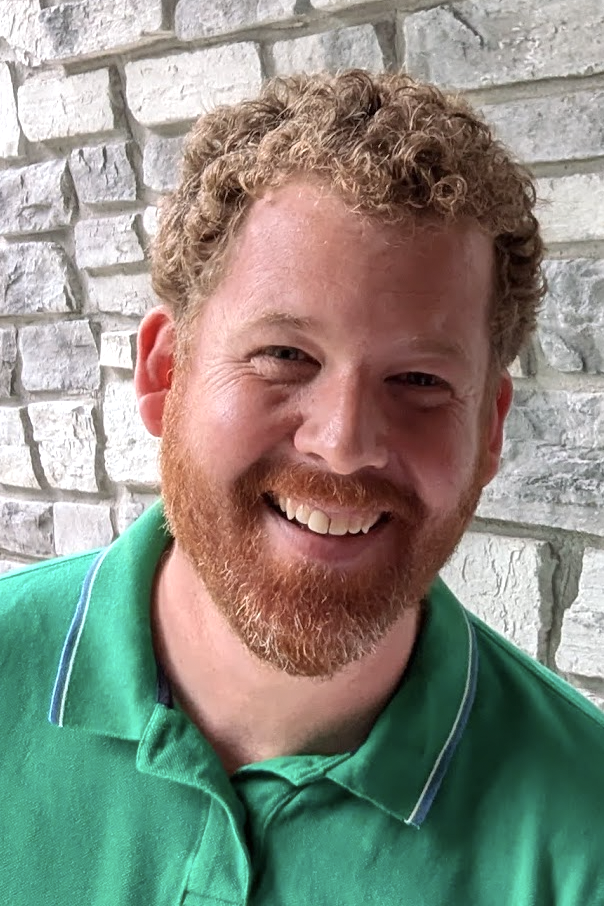
- Stephenson in 2024

Speaker-elect of the Minnesota House of Representatives
- Assuming office January 12, 2027
- Succeeding: Lisa Demuth

DFL Caucus Leader of the Minnesota House of Representatives
- In office September 9, 2025 – January 12, 2027
- Preceded by: Melissa Hortman
- Succeeded by: Position eliminated

Member of the Minnesota House of Representatives
- Incumbent
- Assumed office January 3, 2019
- Preceded by: Mark Uglem
- Constituency: District 36A (2019–2023); District 35A (2023–present)

Personal details
- Born: July 18, 1984 (age 42) Coon Rapids, Minnesota, U.S.
- Party: Democratic
- Spouse: Austin
- Children: 2
- Education: Knox College (BA); University of Chicago (JD)

Zack Stephenson (born July 18, 1984) is an American politician who has served since 2019 as a member of the Minnesota House of Representatives and since 2025 as the House leader of the Minnesota Democratic–Farmer–Labor Party (DFL). He represents District 35A in the northwestern Twin Cities metropolitan area.

== Early life, education, and career ==
Stephenson was born and raised in Coon Rapids, Minnesota, and graduated from Coon Rapids High School in 2002. He attended Knox College, graduating with a Bachelor of Arts in public policy analysis in 2006, and the University of Chicago Law School, graduating with a J.D. in 2010.

Stephenson was a prosecutor for Hennepin County. He was formerly a staffer for U.S. Senator Amy Klobuchar.

== Minnesota House of Representatives ==
Stephenson was first elected to the Minnesota House of Representatives in 2018. He chaired the Commerce Committee, and also served on the Climate and Energy Committee and the Elections Committee. In 2025, he co-chaired the Ways and Means Committee.

During the 2019 session, Stephenson successfully authored a bill to get rid of Minnesota's "marital rape exception". Before his bill passed, Minnesota law prevented prosecution of rape in certain circumstances when the victim was married to the rapist. With the bill's passage, rapists can be prosecuted regardless of whether they are married to the victim.

Stephenson also successfully authored a provision to take the first steps towards building a new Mississippi River crossing between Dayton, Minnesota, and Ramsey, Minnesota.

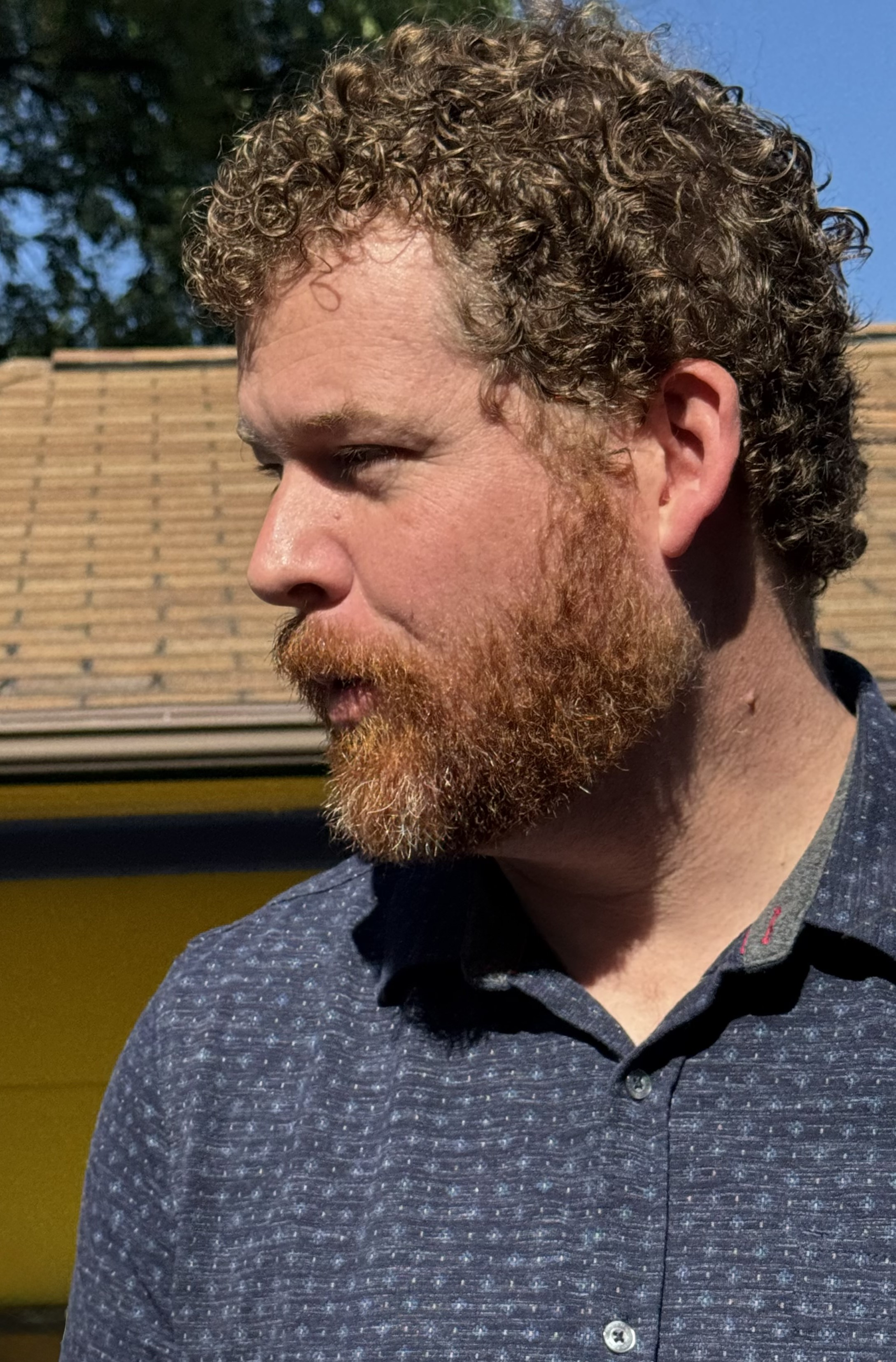
Stephenson in 2025

In 2020, Stephenson was the chief author of a bill to provide grants to small businesses that were not able to operate due to the COVID-19 pandemic. The bill allocated $62.5 million in grants up to $10,000, with $18 million reserved for microbusinesses, defined as businesses with less than 6 employees. Stephenson's bill passed the House by a margin of 129 to 5 and was unanimously approved in the Senate.

Stephenson's legislative priorities include consumer protection and combating climate change. In 2021, he authored the Energy Conservation and Optimization Act, which significantly expands Minnesota's energy conservation programs. The bill is expected to cut carbon emissions in Minnesota, in particular by incentivizing "fuel switching", whereby utilities offer consumers incentives to switch from less efficient fossil fuels to more efficient electricity. Stephenson also authored the Natural Gas Innovation Act (NGIA), which passed into law with bipartisan support in 2021. NGIA gives Minnesota regulators and utilities new tools to decarbonize the building sector, establishes a new goal to reduce the use of fossil gas, and starts a new regulatory proceeding to plan for further decarbonization.

In 2021, Stephenson also secured passage of Minnesota's Student Borrower's Bill of Rights, which regulates student loan servicers and protects student borrowers from abusive practices. He has also authored legislation to ban price gouging by prescription drug companies.

During the 93rd Minnesota Legislature, Stephenson garnered attention as the DFL point person on cannabis legalization. Stephenson also authored legislation that banned political donations from foreign-owned corporations, a bill providing a rebate for electric vehicles, and legislation to criminalize certain misleading deepfakes.

=== DFL leadership ===
On September 9, 2025, Minnesota House Democrats elected Stephenson as their new caucus leader after the assassination of Melissa Hortman in June. After the party won a majority in the 2026 Minnesota House of Representatives election, Stephenson was elected to be the next house speaker.

== Personal life ==
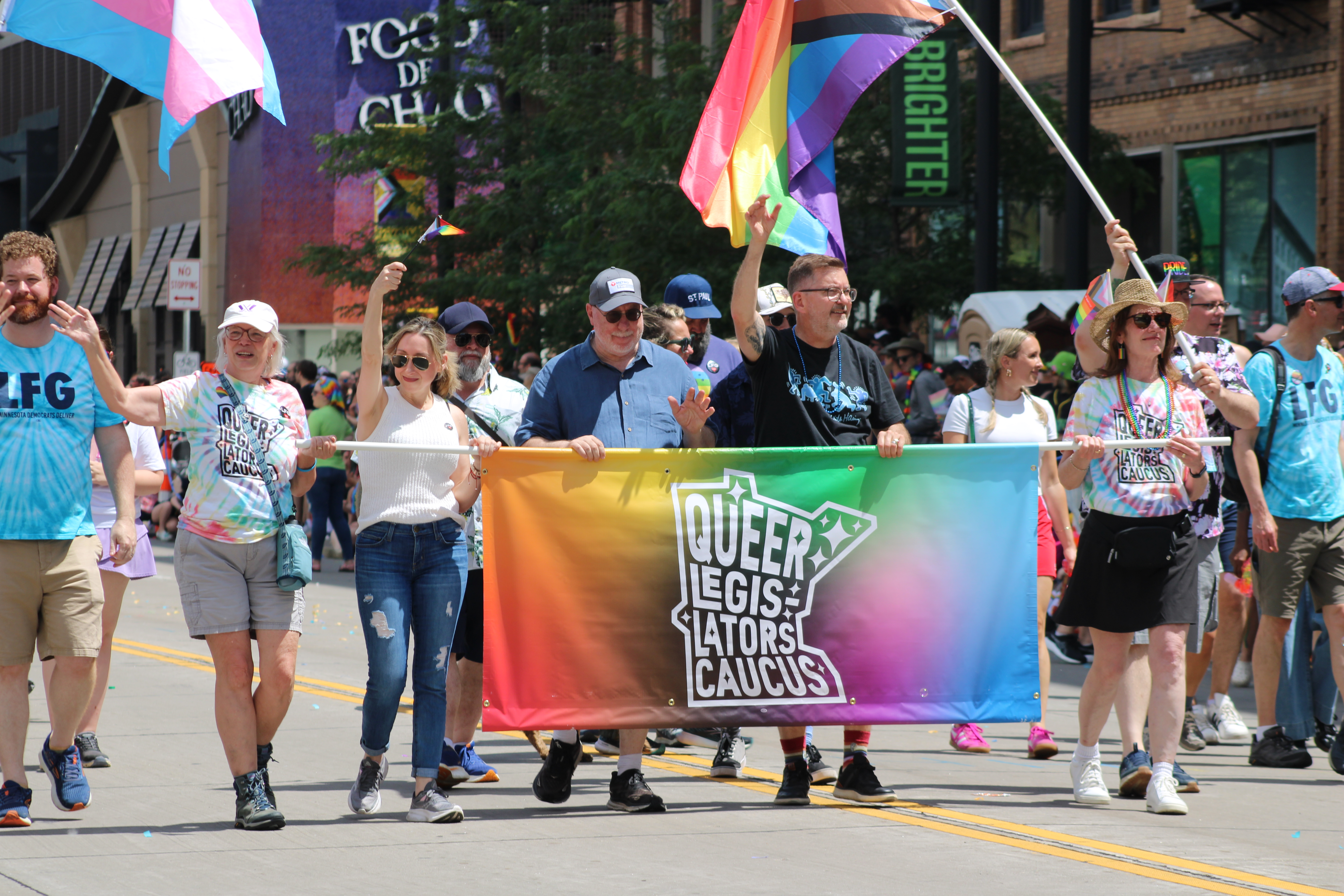
Stephenson (furthest left) marches alongside the Queer Legislators Caucus in the Twin Cities Pride Parade in 2025.

Stephenson and his wife, Austin, have two children. He resides in Coon Rapids, Minnesota. In 2023, he came out as bisexual.

Minnesota House of Representatives
Preceded by Melissa Hortman	Minority Leader of the Minnesota House of Representatives; 2025–present	Incumbent
