= Erin Maye Quade =

American politician (born 1986)

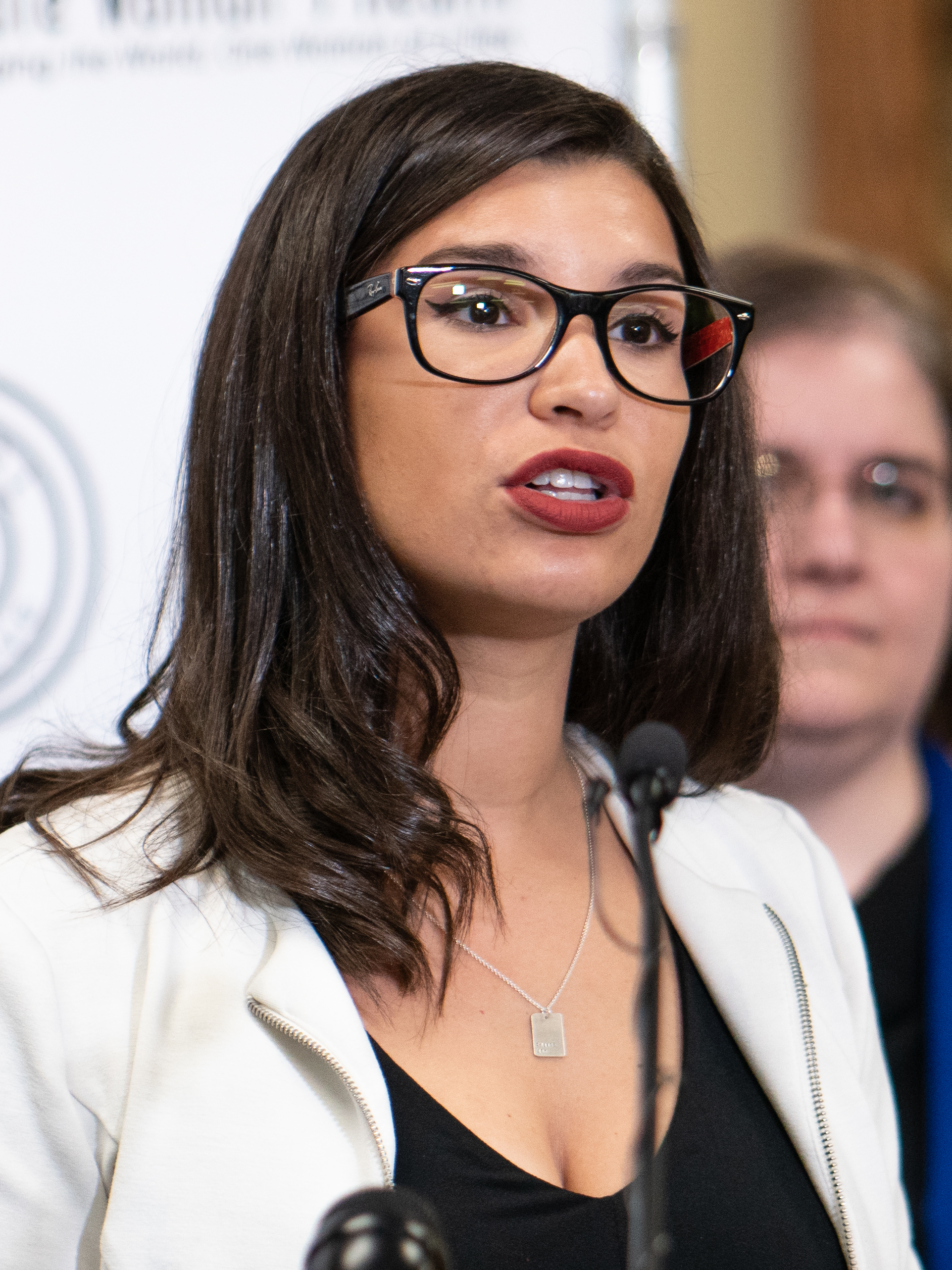

Member of the Minnesota Senate from the 56th district
- Incumbent
- Assumed office January 3, 2023
- Preceded by: Redistricted

Member of the Minnesota House of Representatives from the 57A district
- In office January 3, 2017 – January 7, 2019
- Preceded by: Tara Mack
- Succeeded by: Robert Bierman

Personal details
- Born: March 12, 1986 (age 40) Apple Valley, Minnesota, U.S.
- Party: Democratic
- Spouse: Alyse Maye Quade
- Children: 1
- Education: University of St. Thomas (BA)
- Website: Campaign website

Erin Maye Quade (born March 12, 1986) is an American politician from the state of Minnesota. A member of the Democratic–Farmer–Labor Party (DFL), she was elected to the Minnesota Senate in 2022.

A former staffer for U.S. Representative Keith Ellison, Maye Quade served in the Minnesota House of Representatives from 2017 to 2019. In 2018, she was a candidate for lieutenant governor of Minnesota, serving as Erin Murphy's running mate. The DFL endorsed the Murphy-Maye Quade ticket, making Maye Quade the first LGBTQ person to be endorsed on a major Minnesota political party's ticket.

== Early life and education ==
Maye Quade is biracial: her mother is white and her father is Black. She was raised Lutheran. She graduated from Eastview High School in Apple Valley, Minnesota, in 2004, and from the University of St. Thomas in Saint Paul with a Bachelor of Arts in political science and justice and peace studies in 2008. She began organizing on campus in support of social justice causes affecting queer professors, disabled students, and other issues.

== Career ==
After college, Maye Quade became a community organizer. She worked as a staffer for U.S. Representative Keith Ellison, who encouraged her to run for office.

== Minnesota House of Representatives ==
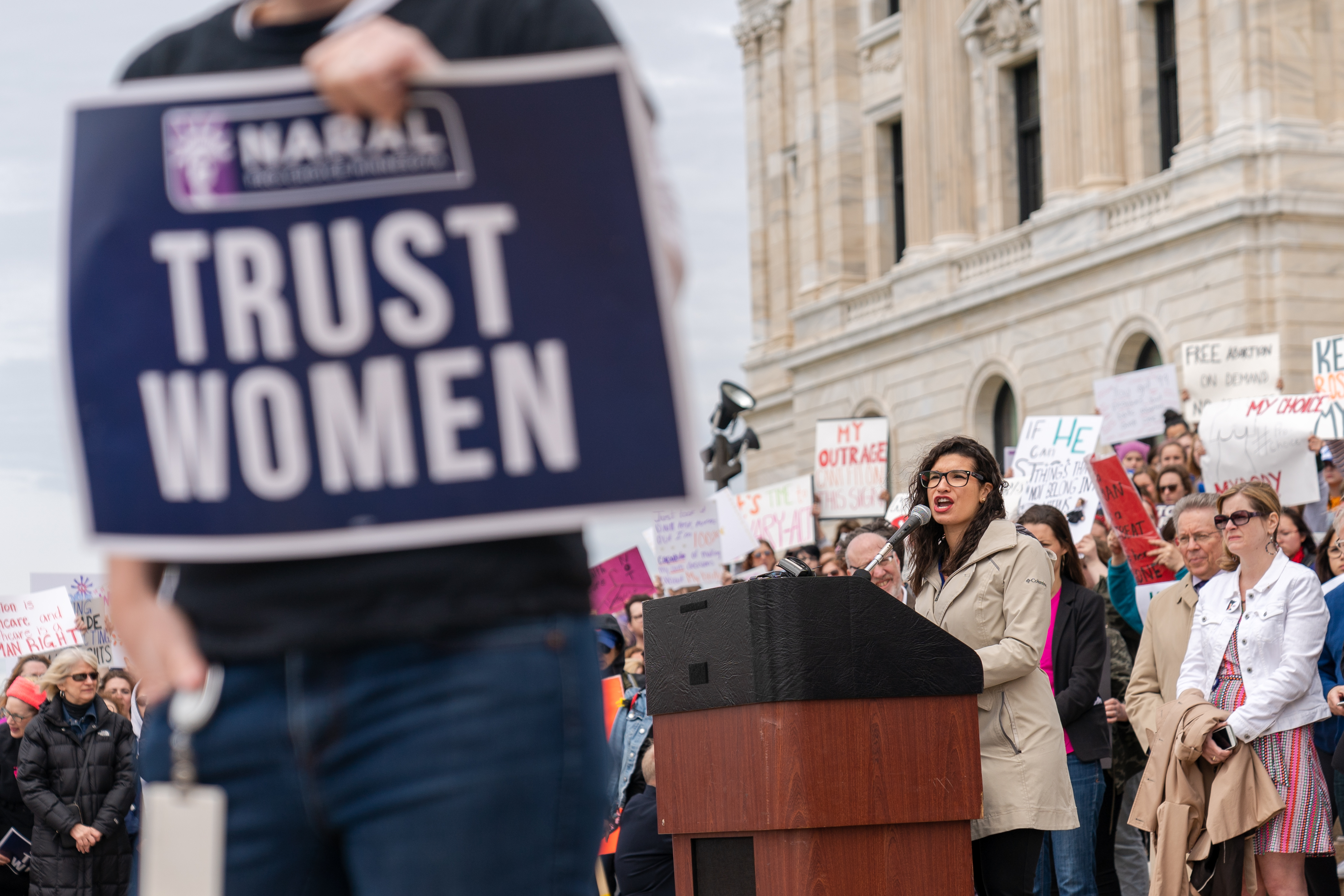
Erin Maye Quade speaks at #StopTheBans rally in St. Paul, Minnesota. May 21, 2019

In 2016, Maye Quade ran for the District 57A seat in the Minnesota House of Representatives. During the campaign, opposition operatives were accused of stalking her campaign staff so persistently that neighborhood watch committees were called in to monitor their activity. She defeated Republican nominee Ali Jimenez-Hopper in the general election, 52% to 47%; hers was one of only two House seats in Minnesota to change hands from Republican to DFL that year. She was the third Black woman to serve in the chamber.

In 2017, Maye Quade accused state legislators Dan Schoen and Tony Cornish of sexual harassment. Both members resigned from office. Following the Stoneman Douglas High School shooting, she led a 24-hour sit-in at the Minnesota House to protest its lack of action on gun control.

== 2018 gubernatorial campaign ==
In June 2018, Minnesota gubernatorial candidate Erin Murphy chose Maye Quade as her running mate. Maye Quade received the DFL endorsement by acclamation at the Minnesota DFL convention on June 3, 2018, making her the first LGBTQ person to be endorsed on the ticket of a major Minnesota political party; at age 32, she was also one of the youngest. Maye Quade and Murphy lost the DFL primary to U.S. Representative Tim Walz and State Representative Peggy Flanagan in August 2018.

== Minnesota State Senate ==
In October 2021, Maye Quade announced her candidacy for the Minnesota Senate seat currently held by Greg Clausen.

On April 23, 2022, Maye Quade gave a campaign speech at the Minnesota Democratic–Farmer–Labor Party convention while experiencing uterine contractions before childbirth. She did not get the nomination at the convention, suspended her campaign, and delivered her daughter, Harriet, at 1 a.m. on April 24. In May, Maye Quade reentered the race. Her victory made her and Clare Oumou Verbeten the first openly LGBTQ women and first Black women elected to the Minnesota Senate.

In 2026, Maye Quade introduced legislation to ban "nudification" websites.

== Personal life ==
Maye Quade is openly lesbian. She is a Lutheran.

Maye Quade's wife, Alyse, is the Political Director of the Minnesota Democratic–Farmer–Labor Party and the former Midwest organizing manager for Everytown for Gun Safety.

== Electoral history ==
=== 2016 ===
Minnesota's State House District 57A election, 2016
Party	Candidate	Votes	%	±%
Democratic (DFL)	Erin Maye Quade	11,825	52.23	+10.71
Republican	Ali Jiminez-Hopper	10,758	47.52	−10.92
Write-in		56	0.25	+0.21
Total votes		22,639	100.00	
Democratic (DFL) gain from Republican				

=== 2018 ===
2018 Minnesota Democratic–Farmer–Labor Party gubernatorial primary
Party	Candidate	Votes	%
Democratic (DFL)	Tim Walz Peggy Flanagan	242,832	41.60%
Democratic (DFL)	Erin Murphy Erin Maye Quade	186,969	32.03%
Democratic (DFL)	Lori Swanson Rick Nolan	143,517	24.59%
Democratic (DFL)	Tim Holden James Mellin	6,398	1.10%
Democratic (DFL)	Olé Savior Chris Edman	4,019	0.69%
Total votes		583,735	100%

=== 2022 ===
2022 Minnesota's 56th State Senate District Democratic primary
Party	Candidate	Votes	%
Democratic (DFL)	Erin Maye Quade	3,939	64.9%
Democratic (DFL)	Justin Emmerich	2,133	35.1%
Total votes		6,072	100%

2022 Minnesota's 56th State Senate District general election
Party	Candidate	Votes	%
Democratic (DFL)	Erin Maye Quade	22,281	56.7%
Republican	Jim Bean	17,007	43.3%
Total votes			100%
