= Mark Uglem =

American politician

Member of the Minnesota House of Representatives from the 36A district
- In office January 8, 2013 – January 7, 2019
- Preceded by: Denise Dittrich (District 47A)
- Succeeded by: Zack Stephenson

Personal details
- Born: May 11, 1951 (age 75)
- Party: Republican Party of Minnesota
- Spouse: Pam
- Children: 3
- Education: University of Minnesota Duluth (B.A.)

Mark Uglem (born May 11, 1951) is an American politician and former member of the Minnesota House of Representatives. A member of the Republican Party of Minnesota, he represented District 36A in the northwestern Twin Cities metropolitan area.

== Education ==
Uglem attended the University of Minnesota Duluth, graduating with a B.A. in urban studies.

== Minnesota House of Representatives ==
Uglem was first elected to the Minnesota House of Representatives in 2012.

== Personal life ==
Uglem is married to his wife, Pam. They have three children and reside in Champlin, Minnesota, where he served as mayor.
