= Brad Tabke =

American politician

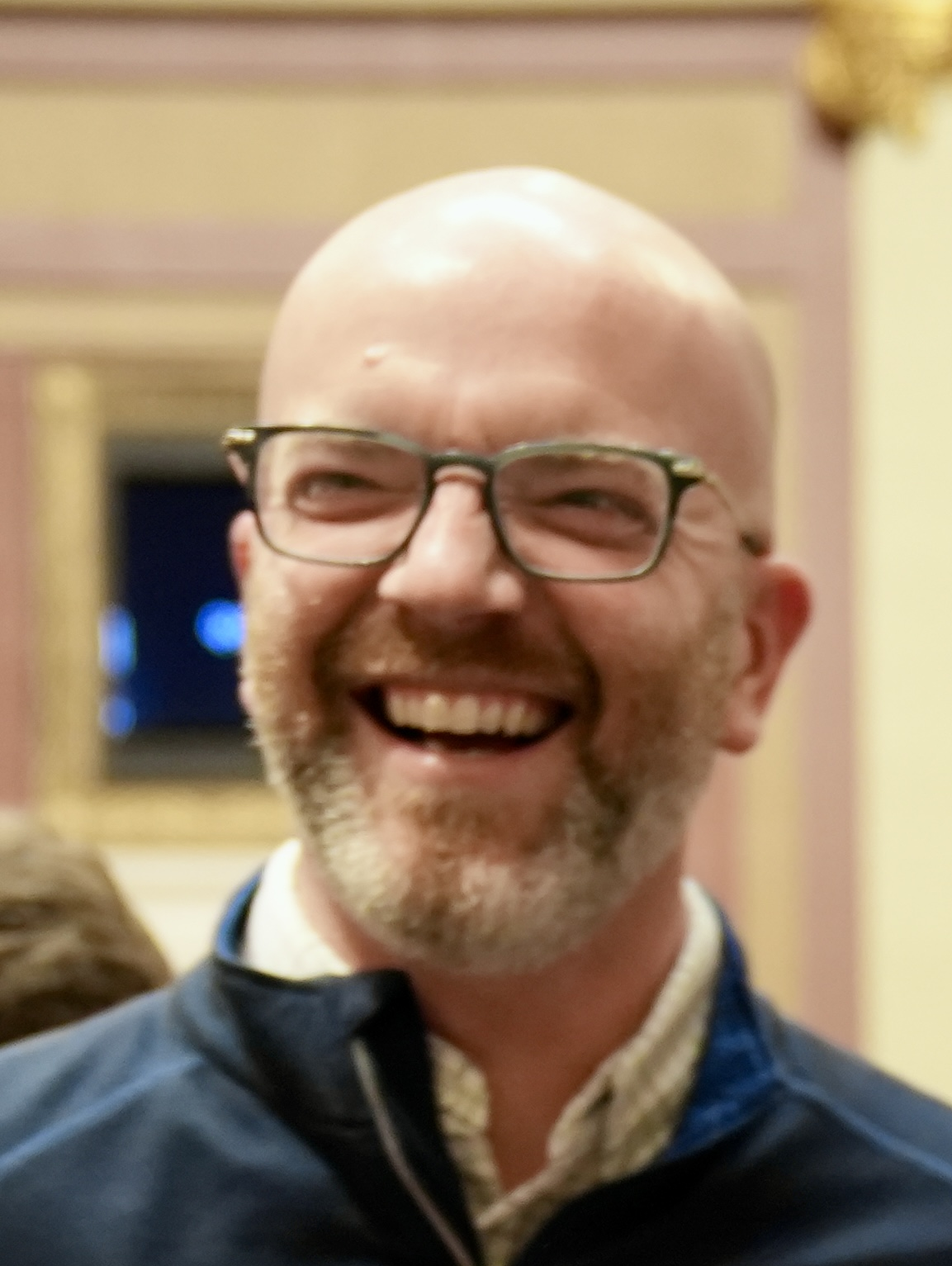
- Tabke in 2025

Member of the Minnesota House of Representatives
- Incumbent
- Assumed office January 3, 2023
- Preceded by: Keith Franke
- Constituency: District 54A
- In office January 8, 2019 – January 5, 2021
- Preceded by: Bob Loonan
- Succeeded by: Erik Mortensen
- Constituency: District 55A

Mayor of Shakopee
- In office January 1, 2012 – January 1, 2016
- Preceded by: John Schmitt
- Succeeded by: Bill Mars

Personal details
- Born: Bradley L. Tabke; May 11, 1979 (age 47)
- Party: Democratic (DFL)
- Spouse: Katy Sullivan
- Children: 2
- Education: Iowa State University
- Occupation: consultant

Brad Tabke (pronounced /tæbkiː/; born May 11, 1979) is an American politician serving in the Minnesota House of Representatives since 2023, having previously served from 2019 to 2021. A member of the Minnesota Democratic–Farmer–Labor Party (DFL), Tabke represents District 54A in the southwestern Twin Cities metropolitan area, which includes the city of Shakopee and parts of Scott County.

== Early life and career ==
Tabke was raised in Moville, Iowa. He attended Iowa State University, graduating with a Bachelor of Science in horticulture.

Tabke owns a consulting firm in downtown Shakopee and is a founder of the Shakopee Diversity Alliance. He is a former member of the Transportation Advisory Board for the Metropolitan Council, former chair of the Shakopee Chamber of Commerce, and former chair of the Shakopee Parks and Recreation Advisory Board. Tabke was Mayor of Shakopee, first elected in 2011 and reelected in 2013.

== Minnesota House of Representatives ==
Tabke was first elected to the Minnesota House of Representatives in 2018, defeating Erik Mortensen, who beat Republican incumbent Bob Loonan in a primary. Tabke lost reelection in 2020 against Mortensen. After redistricting, Tabke ran in 2022 in District 54A and defeated Mortensen in a rematch. In 2024, Tabke was reelected by 15 votes after a recount. The Republican Party challenged this result in court after an error by election administrators caused 21 ballots to go missing; the judge ruled in Tabke's favor, confirming the result and denying a request for a special election.

Tabke sits on the Transportation Finance and Policy, Energy Finance and Policy, and Public Safety Finance and Policy Committees. In the 2023-24 session, he was the vice chair of the Transportation Finance and Policy Committee and an assistant majority leader of the DFL House Caucus.

== Electoral history ==
=== Shakopee Mayor (2011, 2013) ===
2011 Shakopee mayoral election
Party	Candidate	Votes	%
Nonpartisan	Brad Tabke	2,254	54.21
Nonpartisan	John J Schmitt	1,889	45.43
Write-in		15	0.36
Total votes		4,158	100.0

2013 Shakopee mayoral election
Party	Candidate	Votes	%
Nonpartisan	Brad Tabke	2,924	64.59
Nonpartisan	Matt Lehman	1,576	34.81
Write-in		27	0.60
Total votes		4,527	100.0

=== Minnesota House, district 55A (2018, 2020) ===
2018 Minnesota State House - District 55A
Party	Candidate	Votes	%
Democratic (DFL)	Brad Tabke	8,984	51.53
Republican	Erik Mortensen	8,382	48.07
Write-in		70	0.40
Total votes		17,436	100.0
Democratic (DFL) gain from Republican			

2020 Minnesota State House - District 55A
Party	Candidate	Votes	%
Republican	Erik Mortensen	10,926	47.41
Democratic (DFL)	Brad Tabke (incumbent)	10,372	45.00
Legal Marijuana Now	Ryan Martin	1,706	7.40
Write-in		44	0.19
Total votes		23,048	100.0
Republican gain from Democratic (DFL)			

=== Minnesota House, district 54A (2022–present) ===
2022 Minnesota State House - District 54A
Party	Candidate	Votes	%
Democratic (DFL)	Brad Tabke	8,243	51.78
Republican	Erik Mortensen (incumbent)	6,923	43.49
Legal Marijuana Now	Ryan Martin	690	4.33
Write-in		63	0.40
Total votes		15,919	100.0
Democratic (DFL) gain from Republican			

2024 Minnesota State House - District 54A
Party	Candidate	Votes	%
Democratic (DFL)	Brad Tabke (incumbent)	10,980	47.78
Republican	Aaron Paul	10,965	47.72
	All other ballots	1,035	4.50
Total votes		22,980	100.0
Democratic (DFL) hold			

== Personal life ==
Tabke and his wife, Katy, have two children. He has resided in Shakopee since 2003.
