= Joe McDonald (politician) =

American politician (born 1966)

Member of the Minnesota House of Representatives from the 29A district
- Incumbent
- Assumed office January 4, 2011
- Preceded by: Tom Emmer

Personal details
- Born: July 21, 1966 (age 60) Watertown, Minnesota, U.S.
- Party: Republican
- Spouse: Rachel
- Children: 3
- Education: Hennepin Technical College (A.A.)
- Occupation: Photographer; Legislator
- Website: Government website Campaign website

Joseph P. McDonald (born July 21, 1966) is an American politician serving in the Minnesota House of Representatives since 2011. A member of the Republican Party of Minnesota, McDonald represents District 29A northwest of the Twin Cities metropolitan area, which includes the cities of Delano and Rockford and parts of Wright, Meeker, and Hennepin Counties.

== Early life, education, and career ==
McDonald was born in Watertown, Minnesota, to parents of Irish descent. His father, K. J. McDonald, served as a Minnesota state representative from 1977 to 1991, and as Watertown mayor.

McDonald graduated from Hennepin Technical College with an A.A. in photography. He earned his master's degree in photography in 2003 and his Craftsman's degree in photography in 2008. He is a photographer and business owner.

McDonald served on the Delano city council from 2000 to 2006 and as mayor from 2007 until his election to the state legislature.

== Minnesota House of Representatives ==
McDonald was elected to the Minnesota House of Representatives in 2010 and has been reelected every two years since. He first ran after three-term incumbent Tom Emmer announced he would not run for reelection in order to run for governor of Minnesota. In 2022, Joe Crawford, a member of the right-wing group Action 4 Liberty, challenged McDonald in the Republican primary. McDonald was kicked out of an Action 4 Liberty event, and called the Wright County sheriff about the incident. He criticized the group's methods and defended his conservative voting record. He called the group "frauds" and called Erik Mortensen, a fellow lawmaker associated with the group, "a petulant child". No charges were ultimately filed.

McDonald serves as the minority lead for the Labor and Industry Finance and Policy Committee and sits on the Higher Education Finance and Policy Committee.

McDonald opposed legislation that would ban noncompete clauses for many workers, and a bill that would allow a lower minimum wage for tipped employees. He authored a bill to fully repeal the estate tax.

McDonald has supported reforms to the Metropolitan Council, a regional transit planning agency, saying, "we'll do everything we can to make sure the Met Council doesn't put its tentacles into our county". He has voted to repeal gun permit laws in Minnesota. He has said he was open to restoring voting rights to felons in 2020, but advocated for a standalone bill vote.

McDonald opposed legislation to allow liquor stores to open on Sundays, saying, "stay home with your family. Value church and family times". He supported a bill to allow bars to stay open till 4 a.m. during the 2018 Super Bowl LII week, but later expressed reservations about the proposal. McDonald opposed raising taxes to pay for a new Minnesota Vikings stadium and later voted against the final bill.

== Electoral history ==
2010 Minnesota State House - District 19B
| Party | Candidate | Votes | % |
|---|---|---|---|
| Republican | Joe McDonald | 14,770 | 67.22 |
| Democratic (DFL) | Christine Brazelton | 7,179 | 32.67 |
| Write-in | | 25 | 0.11 |
| Total votes | | 21,974 | 100.0 |
| Republican hold | | | |

2012 Minnesota State House - District 29A
| Party | Candidate | Votes | % |
|---|---|---|---|
| Republican | Joe McDonald (incumbent) | 13,002 | 61.94 |
| Democratic (DFL) | Susann Dye | 7,954 | 37.89 |
| Write-in | | 34 | 0.16 |
| Total votes | | 20,990 | 100.0 |
| Republican hold | | | |

2014 Minnesota State House - District 29A
| Party | Candidate | Votes | % |
|---|---|---|---|
| Republican | Joe McDonald (incumbent) | 11,839 | 96.80 |
| Write-in | | 391 | 3.20 |
| Total votes | | 12,230 | 100.0 |
| Republican hold | | | |

2016 Minnesota State House - District 29A
| Party | Candidate | Votes | % |
|---|---|---|---|
| Republican | Joe McDonald (incumbent) | 14,916 | 69.62 |
| Democratic (DFL) | Cortney Phillips | 6,482 | 30.26 |
| Write-in | | 26 | 0.12 |
| Total votes | | 21,424 | 100.0 |
| Republican hold | | | |

2018 Minnesota State House - District 29A
| Party | Candidate | Votes | % |
|---|---|---|---|
| Republican | Joe McDonald (incumbent) | 13,114 | 67.86 |
| Democratic (DFL) | Renée Cardarelle | 6,193 | 32.05 |
| Write-in | | 18 | 0.09 |
| Total votes | | 19,325 | 100.0 |
| Republican hold | | | |

2020 Minnesota State House - District 29A
| Party | Candidate | Votes | % |
|---|---|---|---|
| Republican | Joe McDonald (incumbent) | 17,823 | 70.29 |
| Democratic (DFL) | Renée Cardarelle | 7,499 | 29.57 |
| Write-in | | 36 | 0.14 |
| Total votes | | 25,358 | 100.0 |
| Republican hold | | | |

2022 Minnesota State House - District 29A
| Party | Candidate | Votes | % |
|---|---|---|---|
| Republican | Joe McDonald (incumbent) | 14,798 | 70.68 |
| Democratic (DFL) | Sherri Leyda | 6,115 | 29.21 |
| Write-in | | 24 | 0.11 |
| Total votes | | 20,937 | 100.0 |
| Republican hold | | | |

== Personal life ==
McDonald lives in Delano, Minnesota, with his spouse Rachel, and has three children. He is Catholic and attends St. Peter's Catholic Church in Delano.

Minnesota House of Representatives
| Preceded by Tom Emmer | Member of the Minnesota House of Representatives from the 19B district 2011–2013 | Succeeded by Kathy Brynaert |
| Preceded by Duane Quam | Member of the Minnesota House of Representatives from the 29A district 2013–present | Incumbent |
