= Cheryl Youakim =

American politician

Member of the Minnesota House of Representatives from the 46B district
- Incumbent
- Assumed office January 6, 2015
- Preceded by: Steve Simon

Member of the Hopkins City Council
- In office 2005–2013

Personal details
- Born: May 29, 1969 (age 57) West Germany
- Party: Minnesota Democratic–Farmer–Labor Party
- Spouse: Jacques
- Children: 3
- Education: University of Minnesota (BA)
- Occupation: Paraprofessional educator

Cheryl Youakim (born May 29, 1969) is an American politician serving in the Minnesota House of Representatives since 2015. A member of the Minnesota Democratic–Farmer–Labor Party (DFL), Youakim represents District 46B in the western Twin Cities metropolitan area, which includes the cities of Hopkins and Edina, and parts of Hennepin County.

== Early life, education and career ==
Youakim attended Winona State University and the University of Minnesota, Twin Cities, graduating with a bachelor's degree in journalism. She served on the Hopkins city council from 2005 to 2013.

== Minnesota House of Representatives ==
Youakim was first elected to the Minnesota House of Representatives in 2014, after DFL incumbent Steve Simon resigned to run for Minnesota Secretary of State, and has been reelected every two years since.

From 2019 to 2020 Youakim chaired the Education Policy Committee, and from 2021 to 2022 she chaired the Property Tax Division of the Taxes Committee. Since 2023, she has chaired the Education Finance Committee, and sits on the Education Policy, Taxes, and Ways and Means Committees.

== Electoral history ==
2014 Minnesota State House - District 46B
Party	Candidate	Votes	%
Democratic (DFL)	Cheryl Youakim	9,525	68.50
Republican	Bryan P. Björnson	4,353	31.30
Write-in		28	0.20
Total votes		13,906	100.0
Democratic (DFL) hold			

2016 Minnesota State House - District 46B
Party	Candidate	Votes	%
Democratic (DFL)	Cheryl Youakim (incumbent)	14,988	68.67
Republican	Bryan P. Björnson	6,760	31.97
Write-in		78	0.36
Total votes		21,826	100.0
Democratic (DFL) hold			

2018 Minnesota State House - District 46B
Party	Candidate	Votes	%
Democratic (DFL)	Cheryl Youakim (incumbent)	16,400	75.48
Republican	Melissa Moore	5,297	24.38
Write-in		31	0.14
Total votes		21,728	100.0
Democratic (DFL) hold			

2020 Minnesota State House - District 46B
Party	Candidate	Votes	%
Democratic (DFL)	Cheryl Youakim (incumbent)	18,731	73.66
Republican	Melissa Moore	6,670	26.23
Write-in		27	0.11
Total votes		25,428	100.0
Democratic (DFL) hold			

2022 Minnesota State House - District 46B
Party	Candidate	Votes	%
Democratic (DFL)	Cheryl Youakim (incumbent)	14,738	97.12
Write-in		437	2.88
Total votes		15,175	100.0
Democratic (DFL) hold			

== Personal life ==
Youakim is married to her husband, Jacques. They have three children and reside in Hopkins, Minnesota.
