= Bud Nornes =

American politician

Member of the Minnesota House of Representatives
- In office January 7, 1997 – January 6, 2021
- Preceded by: Bob Anderson
- Succeeded by: Jordan Rasmusson
- Constituency: 10A (1997–2013); 8A (2013–2021

Personal details
- Born: March 21, 1943 (age 83) Beltrami, Minnesota, U.S.
- Party: Republican
- Spouse: Joyce
- Children: 3
- Education: Brown College (BA)

Larry B. "Bud" Nornes (born March 21, 1943) is an American politician, businessman, and broadcaster who served as a member of the Minnesota House of Representatives from 1997 to 2021. A member of the Republican Party of Minnesota, he represented District 8A, which includes most of Otter Tail County in west central Minnesota.

== Education ==
Nornes graduated from Fertile High School in Fertile, then attended Brown Institute of Broadcasting in 1962 for training in communications and broadcasting.

== Career ==
Nornes has been a broadcaster and radio station owner since 1962. He was a member of the Fergus Falls School Board from 1983 to 1996. He is a member of the Minnesota Broadcaster Association and the National Association of Broadcasters. He is also active in his community as a member of the Fergus Falls Chamber of Commerce, Ducks Unlimited, the Elks, the Kiwanis, Pheasants Forever, and the United Way.

Nornes is the former owner of radio stations KJJK AM and KJJK FM, based in Fergus Falls. He was first elected to the Minnesota House of Representatives in 1996, and was reelected every two years until retiring in 2021. He is a former assistant majority whip.

== Personal life ==
Nornes's great-grandfather, Ole Opdahl, also served as a Republican member of the Minnesota House, from 1903 to 1907. A farmer in Mansfield Township, Opdahl represented the old District 9, which included Freeborn County.
