= 2008 Minnesota House of Representatives election =

- November 4, 2008

All 134 seats in the Minnesota House of Representatives 68 seats needed for a majority
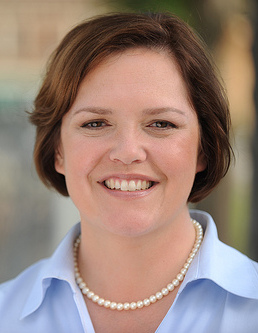

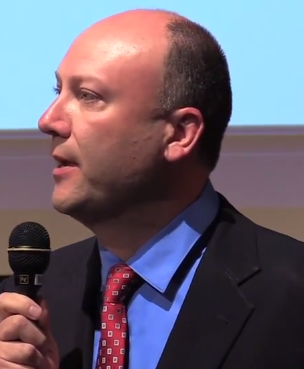
	Majority party	Minority party
Leader	Margaret Anderson Kelliher	Marty Seifert
Party	Democratic (DFL)	Republican
Leader since	June 20, 2006	January 3, 2007
Leader's seat	60A–Minneapolis	21A–Marshall
Last election	85 seats, 54.86%	49 seats, 44.44%
Seats won	87	47
Seat change	▲2	▼2
Popular vote	1,516,633	1,211,020
Percentage	54.87%	43.81%
Swing	▲0.01 pp	▼0.63 pp
Speaker before election
Margaret Anderson Kelliher
Democratic (DFL)
Elected Speaker
Margaret Anderson Kelliher
Democratic (DFL)

The 2008 Minnesota House of Representatives election was held in the U.S. state of Minnesota on November 4, 2008, to elect members to the House of Representatives of the 86th Minnesota Legislature. A primary election was held in several districts on September 9, 2008.

The Minnesota Democratic–Farmer–Labor Party (DFL) won a majority of seats, remaining the majority party, followed by the Republican Party of Minnesota. The new Legislature convened on January 6, 2009.

== Predictions ==
Source	Ranking	As of
Stateline	Safe D	October 15, 2008

== Results ==
Districts won

Summary of the November 4, 2008 Minnesota House of Representatives election results
Party	Candidates	Votes			Seats		
Party	Candidates	No.	%	∆pp	No.	∆No.	%
Minnesota Democratic–Farmer–Labor Party	134	1,516,633	54.87	▲0.01	87	▲2	64.93
Republican Party of Minnesota	134	1,211,020	43.81	▼0.63	47	▼2	35.07
Independence Party of Minnesota	11	14,601	0.53	▲0.22	0	Steady	0.00
Green Party of Minnesota	3	6,648	0.24	▲0.11	0	Steady	0.00
Independent	3	9,717	0.35	▲0.32	0	Steady	0.00
Write-in	N/A	5,670	0.21	▼0.03	0	Steady	0.00
Total		2,764,289	100.00	±0.00	134	±0	100.00
Invalid/blank votes		157,209	5.38	▲1.48			
Turnout (out of 3,740,142 eligible voters)		2,921,498	78.11	▲17.64			
Source: Minnesota Secretary of State, Minnesota Legislative Reference Library

=== District results ===
Source: Minnesota Secretary of State

==== District 1A ====
Party	Candidate	Votes	%
Democratic (DFL)	Dave Olin	8,726	50.27
Republican	Steve Lillestol	7,851	45.23
Independence	J.C. Carlson	771	4.44
Write-in		10	0.06
Total votes		17,359	100%

==== District 1B ====
Party	Candidate	Votes	%
Democratic (DFL)	Bernie Lieder	10,193	58.83
Republican	Lonn Kiel	7,116	41.07
Write-in		17	0.10
Total votes		17,326	100%

==== District 2A ====
Party	Candidate	Votes	%
Democratic (DFL)	Kent Eken	11,411	63.54
Republican	Steve Green	6,535	36.39
Write-in		14	0.08
Total votes		17,960	100%

==== District 2B ====
Party	Candidate	Votes	%
Democratic (DFL)	Brita Sailer	10,773	54.12
Republican	Doug Lindgren	9,117	45.80
Write-in		14	0.07
Total votes		19,904	100%

==== District 3A ====
Party	Candidate	Votes	%
Democratic (DFL)	Tom Anzelc	11,219	59.53
Republican	Marv Ott	6,506	34.52
Independence	Bill Hamm	1,110	5.89
Write-in		10	0.05
Total votes		18,835	100%

==== District 3B ====
Party	Candidate	Votes	%
Democratic (DFL)	Loren Solberg	11,951	57.70
Republican	Carolyn McElfatrick	8,732	42.16
Write-in		28	0.14
Total votes		20,711	100%

==== District 4A ====
Party	Candidate	Votes	%
Democratic (DFL)	John Persell	10,259	52.06
Republican	John Carlson	8,666	43.98
Independence	Sharatin Blake	758	3.85
Write-in		23	0.12
Total votes		19,706	100%

==== District 4B ====
Party	Candidate	Votes	%
Republican	Larry Howes	12,820	53.68
Democratic (DFL)	Meg Bye	11,032	46.19
Write-in		30	0.13
Total votes		23,882	100%

==== District 5A ====
Party	Candidate	Votes	%
Democratic (DFL)	Tom Rukavina	16,230	78.33
Republican	Greg Knutson	4,461	21.53
Write-in		29	0.14
Total votes		20,720	100%

==== District 5B ====
Party	Candidate	Votes	%
Democratic (DFL)	Tony Sertich	13,956	70.03
Republican	John Larson	5,953	29.87
Write-in		19	0.10
Total votes		19,928	100%

==== District 6A ====
Party	Candidate	Votes	%
Democratic (DFL)	David Dill	15,932	71.47
Republican	Marty Breaker	6,213	27.87
Write-in		147	0.66
Total votes		22,292	100%

==== District 6B ====
Party	Candidate	Votes	%
Democratic (DFL)	Mary Murphy	14,807	65.23
Republican	Steve Townsend	7,823	34.46
Write-in		70	0.31
Total votes		22,700	100%

==== District 7A ====
Party	Candidate	Votes	%
Democratic (DFL)	Tom Huntley	15,029	66.18
Republican	Ryan Stauber	7,595	33.44
Write-in		86	0.38
Total votes		22,710	100%

==== District 7B ====
Party	Candidate	Votes	%
Democratic (DFL)	Roger Reinert	13,364	72.96
Republican	Allan Kehr	3,648	19.91
Independence	Jay Cole	1,259	6.87
Write-in		47	0.26
Total votes		18,318	100%

==== District 8A ====
Party	Candidate	Votes	%
Democratic (DFL)	Bill Hilty	13,042	65.08
Republican	Tim Hafvenstein	6,956	34.71
Write-in		41	0.20
Total votes		20,039	100%

==== District 8B ====
Party	Candidate	Votes	%
Democratic (DFL)	Tim Faust	10,258	50.63
Republican	Judy Soderstrom	9,951	49.12
Write-in		51	0.25
Total votes		20,260	100%

==== District 9A ====
Party	Candidate	Votes	%
Republican	Morrie Lanning	11,739	59.15
Democratic (DFL)	Mark Olaf Altenburg	8,064	40.63
Write-in		44	0.22
Total votes		19,847	100%

==== District 9B ====
Party	Candidate	Votes	%
Democratic (DFL)	Paul Marquart	15,095	74.87
Republican	Dayna Olson	5,054	25.07
Write-in		12	0.06
Total votes		20,161	100%

==== District 10A ====
Party	Candidate	Votes	%
Republican	Bud Nornes	11,212	55.49
Democratic (DFL)	Greg Stumbo	8,981	44.45
Write-in		12	0.06
Total votes		20,205	100%

==== District 11A ====
Party	Candidate	Votes	%
Republican	Torrey Westrom	13,699	64.89
Democratic (DFL)	Bruce Campbell	6,328	29.97
Independence	Dave Holman	1,064	5.04
Write-in		20	0.09
Total votes		21,111	100%

==== District 11B ====
Party	Candidate	Votes	%
Democratic (DFL)	Mary Otremba	10,681	52.34
Republican	Dave Kircher	9,682	47.44
Write-in		44	0.22
Total votes		20,407	100%

==== District 12A ====
Party	Candidate	Votes	%
Democratic (DFL)	John Ward	13,766	64.93
Republican	David Pundt	7,410	34.95
Write-in		26	0.12
Total votes		21,202	100%

==== District 12B ====
Party	Candidate	Votes	%
Democratic (DFL)	Al Doty	10,071	50.11
Republican	Mike LeMieur	9,995	49.73
Write-in		33	0.16
Total votes		20,099	100%

==== District 13A ====
Party	Candidate	Votes	%
Republican	Paul H. Anderson	11,422	58.35
Democratic (DFL)	Bruce Shuck	8,128	41.52
Write-in		24	0.12
Total votes		19,574	100%

==== District 13B ====
Party	Candidate	Votes	%
Democratic (DFL)	Al Juhnke	10,211	53.72
Republican	Bonnie Wilhelm	8,770	46.14
Write-in		28	0.15
Total votes		19,009	100%

==== District 14A ====
Party	Candidate	Votes	%
Republican	Dan Severson	12,927	54.95
Democratic (DFL)	Rob Jacobs	10,572	44.94
Write-in		28	0.12
Total votes		23,527	100%

==== District 14B ====
Party	Candidate	Votes	%
Democratic (DFL)	Larry Hosch	14,415	67.09
Republican	Jim Stauber	7,045	32.79
Write-in		25	0.12
Total votes		21,485	100%

==== District 15A ====
Party	Candidate	Votes	%
Republican	Steve Gottwalt	11,446	53.60
Democratic (DFL)	Joanne Dorsher	9,873	46.23
Write-in		37	0.17
Total votes		21,356	100%

==== District 15B ====
Party	Candidate	Votes	%
Democratic (DFL)	Larry Haws	11,008	67.15
Republican	Joshua Behling	5,322	32.47
Write-in		62	0.38
Total votes		16,392	100%

==== District 16A ====
Party	Candidate	Votes	%
Democratic (DFL)	Gail Kulick Jackson	11,044	50.10
Republican	Sondra Erickson	10,955	49.70
Write-in		45	0.20
Total votes		22,044	100%

==== District 16B ====
Party	Candidate	Votes	%
Republican	Mary Kiffmeyer	15,863	63.52
Democratic (DFL)	Steve Andrews	8,996	36.02
Write-in		114	0.46
Total votes		24,973	100%

==== District 17A ====
Party	Candidate	Votes	%
Republican	Rob Eastlund	12,448	53.18
Democratic (DFL)	Jim Godfrey	10,212	43.63
Independent	Daniel Sweeney	719	3.07
Write-in		28	0.12
Total votes		23,407	100%

==== District 41A ====
Party	Candidate	Votes	%
Republican	Keith Downey	8,925	36.69
Independent	Ron Erhardt	7,760	31.90
Democratic (DFL)	Kevin Staunton	7,626	31.35
Write-in		16	0.07
Total votes		24,312	100%

==== District 54B ====
Party	Candidate	Votes	%
Democratic (DFL)	Bev Scalze	11,573	55.06
Republican	Julie Johnson	6,852	32.60
Independence	Paul Gaston	2,556	12.16
Write-in		36	0.17
Total votes		21,017	100%

==== District 59A ====
Party	Candidate	Votes	%
Democratic (DFL)	Diane Loeffler	13,785	75.29
Republican	Felix Montez	2,520	13.76
Independent	Lynne Torgerson	1,238	6.76
Independence	David Degrio	723	3.95
Write-in		43	0.23
Total votes		18,309	100%

==== District 61B ====
Party	Candidate	Votes	%
Democratic (DFL)	Jeff Hayden	8,795	60.23
Green	Farheen Hakeem	4,423	30.29
Republican	Lynne Torgerson	1,238	9.29
Write-in		28	0.19
Total votes		14,602	100%

== See also ==
- Minnesota Senate election, 2006
- Minnesota gubernatorial election, 2006
- Minnesota elections, 2008
