= Erin Murphy (Minnesota politician) =

American politician (born 1960)

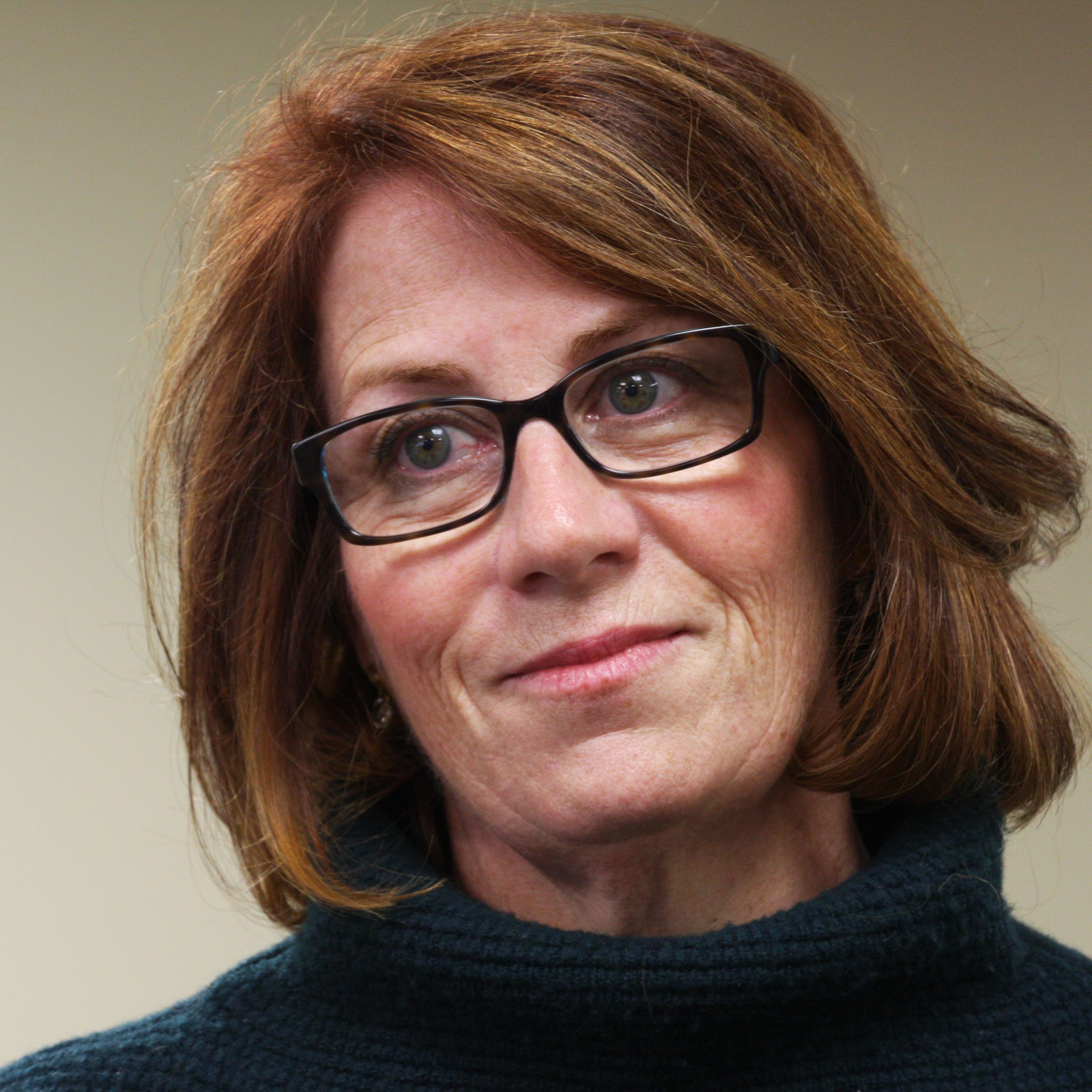
- Murphy in 2017

Majority Leader of the Minnesota Senate
- Incumbent
- Assumed office February 6, 2024
- Preceded by: Kari Dziedzic

Member of the Minnesota Senate from the 64th district
- Incumbent
- Assumed office January 5, 2021
- Preceded by: Dick Cohen

Majority Leader of the Minnesota House of Representatives
- In office January 8, 2013 – January 6, 2015
- Preceded by: Matt Dean
- Succeeded by: Joyce Peppin

Member of the Minnesota House of Representatives from the 64A district
- In office January 3, 2007 – January 8, 2019
- Preceded by: Matt Entenza
- Succeeded by: Kaohly Her

Personal details
- Born: March 13, 1960 (age 66) Columbus, Wisconsin, U.S.
- Party: Democratic
- Spouse: Joe Faust
- Children: 2
- Education: University of Wisconsin, Oshkosh (BS); St. Catherine University (MA)
- Website: Campaign website

Erin Murphy (born March 13, 1960) is an American politician serving as Majority Leader of the Minnesota Senate since 2024. A member of the Minnesota Democratic–Farmer–Labor Party (DFL), she represents District 64, which includes the Highland Park, Macalester-Groveland, Merriam Park, Summit Hill, and St. Anthony Park, neighborhoods of the city of Saint Paul in Ramsey County in the Twin Cities metropolitan area. She is a former Majority Leader of the Minnesota House of Representatives, executive director of the Minnesota Nurses Association, and is also a registered nurse.

== Education ==
Murphy graduated from high school in Janesville, Wisconsin, and attended the University of Wisconsin–Oshkosh, receiving her B.S. in nursing in 1984. She earned her M.A. in organizational leadership in health care at the College of St. Catherine in Saint Paul, Minnesota in 2005, and also attended the Humphrey Institute at the University of Minnesota from 2005 to 2006 as a policy fellow.

== Career and community service ==
Murphy is a former executive director of the Minnesota Nurses Association and has also worked for the organization as a lobbyist and organizer. She worked in state government as legislative director for former Minnesota Attorney General Hubert H. Humphrey III, and as community relations director for the Minnesota Department of Children, Families and Learning. She was also an operating room nurse at the University of Minnesota Medical Center.

Murphy served on the board of directors of Citizens for a Safer Minnesota from 1999 to 2001, and as a member of the board of trustees of the American Nurses Association political action committee. She was also an executive board member of the Minnesota chapter of the AFL–CIO.

== Political career ==
=== State House ===
Murphy was first elected in 2006, and reelected in 2008, 2010, 2012, 2014, and 2016. She served on the Rules and Legislative Administration Committee, the Health Care and Human Services Policy and Oversight Committee, the Taxes Committee, the Finance Subcommittee for Health Care and Human Services Finance Division, and the Health Care and Human Services Policy and Oversight Subcommittee for the Licensing Division.

After the 2012 elections, Murphy was elected by the DFL House caucus to be Majority Leader. She served in this role until the DFL lost its majority in 2015.

=== 2018 gubernatorial campaign ===
Murphy announced her candidacy for governor of Minnesota on November 17, 2016. She said her top priorities in office would be ensuring proper care for Minnesota's aging population, lessening the educational achievement gap, reducing racial disparities among Minnesotans, and bringing more jobs to Minnesota. Murphy supported a statewide single-payer healthcare system. She earned the endorsement of the Minnesota DFL at its annual convention in Rochester on June 2, 2018, after seven rounds of voting. Lori Swanson announced her candidacy after the convention, where she lost the endorsement for attorney general. U.S. Representative Tim Walz defeated Murphy and Swanson in the August 14 primary and was elected governor in November.

=== State Senate ===
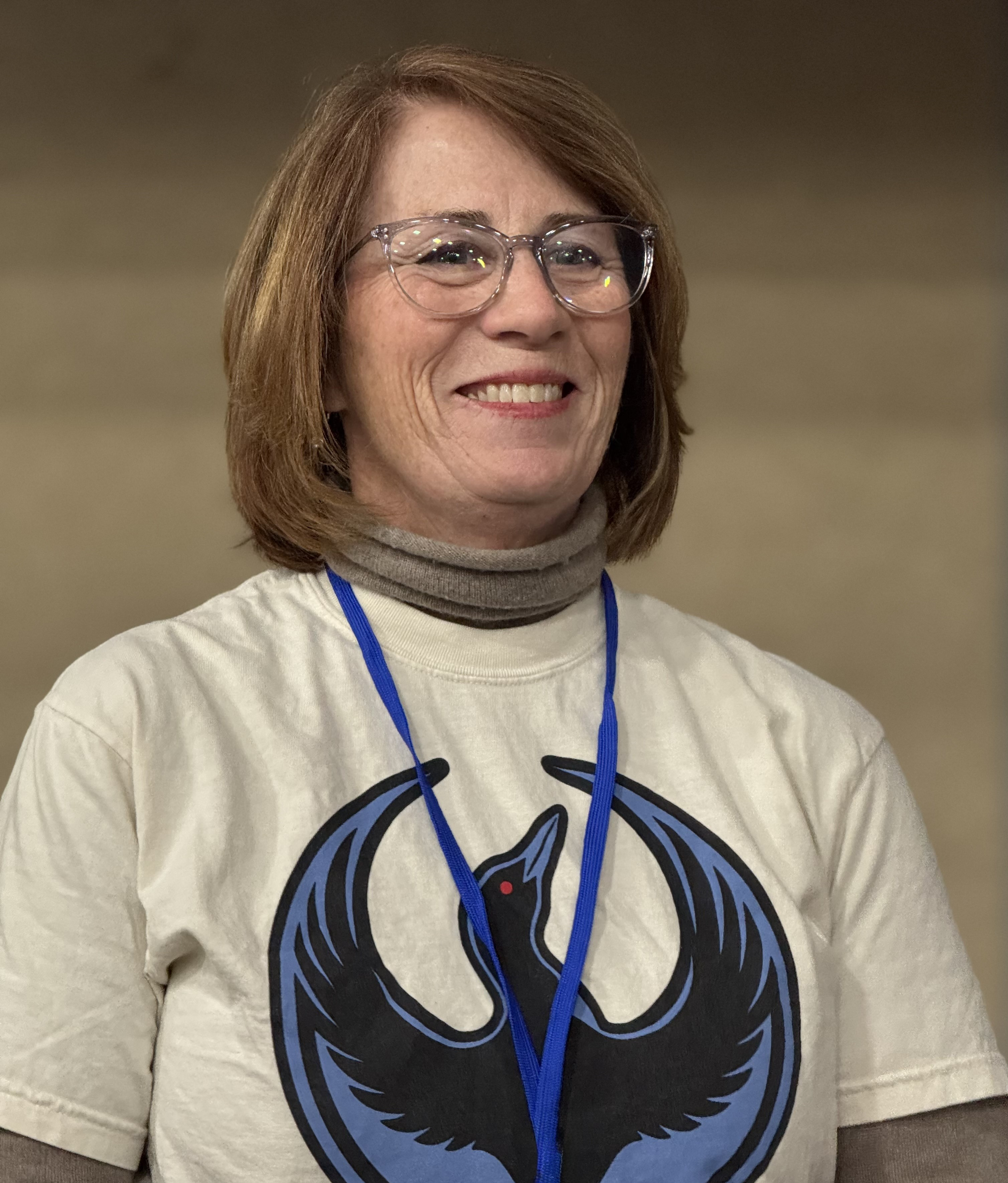
Murphy in 2026

In October 2019, Murphy announced she would launch a primary campaign against State Senator Dick Cohen. Murphy's House district covered the northern half of Cohen's Senate district. The next month, Cohen dropped out of the race.

Murphy was elected to the Minnesota Senate in 2020. As of 2024, she is the chair of the Rules and Administration committee and also serves on both the Finance committee and the Higher Education committee.

The Senate DFL caucus selected Murphy as majority leader in February 2024, following the resignation of Kari Dziedzic due to health concerns. Senate President Bobby Joe Champion supported Murphy, and Senator Ann Rest said Murphy had unanimous support from the DFL caucus.

== Personal life ==
Murphy has lived in Saint Paul since moving there in 1988. She has been married to Joe Faust since 1989, and they have two children. She identifies as Catholic.

Minnesota House of Representatives
Preceded by Matt Dean	Majority Leader of the Minnesota House of Representatives; 2013–2015	Succeeded by Joyce Peppin
Minnesota Senate
Preceded by Kari Dziedzic	Majority Leader of the Minnesota Senate; 2024–present	Incumbent
