= Biernat =

Biernat is a Polish-language surname. Notable people with the surname include:

- Agata Biernat (born 1989), Polish beauty pageant titleholder
- Andrzej Biernat (born 1960), Polish politician
- Edmond Biernat (born 1939), French footballer
- Gertruda Biernat (1923–2016), Polish palaeontologist
- Jarosław Biernat (1960–2019), Polish footballer
- Len Biernat (born 1946), American politician
- Monica Biernat, American social psychologist
- Thaddeus Lewis Biernat (1918–1996), American businessman and politician

== Se lso ==
- Biernat of Lublin
