= 2020 Minnesota House of Representatives district 60A special election =

2020 District 60A special election
- February 4, 2020

Minnesota House of Representatives District 60A
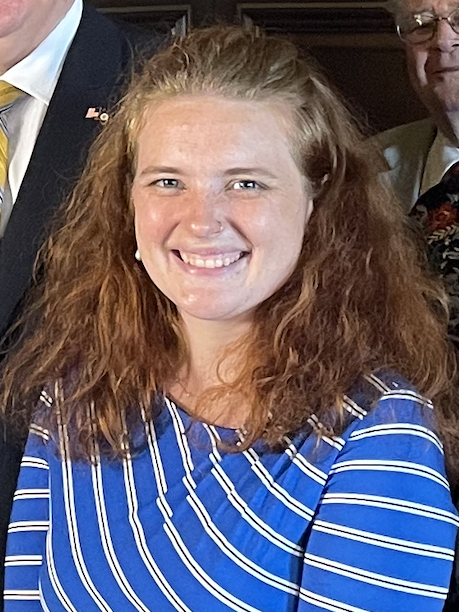
		LMN
Nominee	Sydney Jordan	Marty Super
Party	Democratic (DFL)	Legal Marijuana Now
Popular vote	1,879	247
Percentage	87.44%	11.49%
Representative before election
Diane Loeffler
Democratic (DFL)
Elected Representative
Sydney Jordan
Democratic (DFL)

A special election was held in the U.S. state of Minnesota on February 4, 2020, to elect a new member for District 60A in the Minnesota House of Representatives, caused by the death of Democratic–Farmer–Labor (DFL) member Diane Loeffler. A primary election was held on January 21, 2020, to nominate a DFL candidate. Sydney Jordan, the DFL nominee, won the special election.

== Background ==
On November 16, 2019, District 60A 15-year incumbent Diane Loeffler died of cancer. On November 27, 2019, Governor Tim Walz announced the date of the primary and special elections. Walz chose the date of the primary election to accommodate the large student population in the district, while still taking place before the February 11 reconvening of the 91st Minnesota Legislature.

District 60A is located in Hennepin County, representing northeast Minneapolis. Loeffler first represented the area when it was District 59A after winning election in 2004, succeeding fellow DFL member Len Biernat, who did not seek re-election. In the last election in 2018, Loeffler won with 86 percent of the vote.

== Candidates ==
The candidate filing period was from December 3 to December 10, 2019.

=== Minnesota Democratic–Farmer–Labor Party ===
- Mohamed Barre, employee for the Hennepin County Health and Human Services Department
- Piyali Nath Dalal, writer
- Amal Ibrahim, interpreter
- Jessica Intermill, attorney
- Sydney Jordan, state director of Save the Boundary Waters
- Sonia Neculescu, political action director of Women for Political Change
- Aaron Neumann, real estate broker; former aide for then-U.S. Representative Keith Ellison
- Aswar Rahman, social media director for U.S. Senator Amy Klobuchar's 2020 presidential campaign; candidate for mayor of Minneapolis in 2017
- Saciido Shaie, cofounder and executive director of the Ummah Project
- Zachary Wefel, attorney
- Susan Whitaker, human resources employee for Hennepin County

=== Legal Marijuana Now Party ===
- Marty Super, candidate for the Minnesota Senate in District 60 in 2016

== Primary election ==
The area represented by District 60A has in recent decades voted overwhelmingly for DFL candidates. The winner of the DFL nomination would likely be the winner of the special election.

=== Results ===
Party	Candidate	Votes	%
Minnesota Democratic–Farmer–Labor Party	Sydney Jordan	1,318	28.55
Minnesota Democratic–Farmer–Labor Party	Jessica Intermill	976	21.14
Minnesota Democratic–Farmer–Labor Party	Sonia Neculescu	792	17.15
Minnesota Democratic–Farmer–Labor Party	Amal Ibrahim	342	7.41
Minnesota Democratic–Farmer–Labor Party	Aaron Neumann	269	5.83
Minnesota Democratic–Farmer–Labor Party	Zachary Wefel	179	3.88
Minnesota Democratic–Farmer–Labor Party	Aswar Rahman	175	3.79
Minnesota Democratic–Farmer–Labor Party	Susan Whitaker	171	3.70
Minnesota Democratic–Farmer–Labor Party	Saciido Shaie	157	3.40
Minnesota Democratic–Farmer–Labor Party	Piyali Nath Dalal	149	3.23
Minnesota Democratic–Farmer–Labor Party	Mohamed Barre	89	1.93
Subtotal		4,617	100.00
Legal Marijuana Now Party	Marty Super	69	100.00
Total		4,686	100.00
Invalid/blank votes		29	0.62
Turnout (out of 26,581 registered voters)		4,715	17.74
Source: Minnesota Secretary of State

== Results ==
Party	Candidate	Votes	%	+/−
Minnesota Democratic–Farmer–Labor Party	Sydney Jordan	1,879	87.44	+0.99
Legal Marijuana Now Party	Marty Super	247	11.49	+11.49
Write-ins		23	1.07	+0.80
Total		2,149	100.00	±0.00
Invalid/blank votes		6	0.28	−2.38
Turnout (out of 26,518 registered voters)		2,155	8.13	−70.11
Source: Minnesota Secretary of State

== See also ==
- 2020 Minnesota House of Representatives District 30A special election
- List of special elections to the Minnesota House of Representatives
