= Rick H. Hoyle =

American psychologist

- Known for: Structural equation modeling Research on self-regulation and intellectual humility
- Awards: Algernon Sydney Sullivan Award (2017)

Academic background
- Education: Appalachian State University (BA); University of North Carolina at Chapel Hill (MA, PhD)

Academic work
- Discipline: Psychology; Social psychology Quantitative psychology
- Institutions: Duke University

Rick H. Hoyle is an American psychologist and academic who is Professor of Psychology and Neuroscience at Duke University. His research focuses on self-regulation, personality and social psychology, structural equation modeling, and quantitative methodology in the behavioral sciences.

== Education ==
Hoyle received his B.A. in Psychology, magna cum laude, from Appalachian State University in 1983. He earned his M.A. in 1986 and Ph.D. in 1988 in Psychology from the University of North Carolina at Chapel Hill.

== Academic career ==
Hoyle began his academic career with appointments at Duke University and the University of North Carolina at Chapel Hill (1988–1989). He joined the University of Kentucky in 1989, where he served as Professor and Chair of the Department of Psychology from 1999 to 2003.

In 2003, he returned to Duke University, where he served as associate director of the Center for Child and Family Policy from 2004 to 2018. Since 2008, he has served as Professor in the Department of Psychology and Neuroscience. He has been Director of the Center for the Study of Adolescent Risk and Resilience since 2013 and was appointed Associate Chair of the department in 2024.

Hoyle served as Editor of Journal of Social Issues from 2006 to 2009. He later served as Editor of Self and Identity from 2013 to 2016. From 2024 to 2026, he has served as Associate Editor of American Psychologist.

== Research ==
Hoyle’s research focuses on topics in social psychology, personality psychology, and quantitative methods in the behavioral sciences. His work includes contributions to the study of self-regulation, intellectual humility, autobiographical memory, and adolescent development. His work examines how individuals regulate thought, emotion, and behavior, and how these processes relate to health and social outcomes.

He has contributed to the development and application of structural equation modeling and other multivariate methods in the behavioral sciences. His methodological publications address topics such as mediation analysis, measurement, and latent variable modeling.

His empirical research includes studies of self-control, academic and health-related behaviors, substance use, digital media use, and adolescent risk and resilience, frequently using longitudinal designs.

== Honors and awards ==
- Fellow of the Association for Psychological Science
- Fellow of the Society of Experimental Social Psychology
- Fellow of the Society for General Psychology
- Fellow of the Society for Personality and Social Psychology
- Fellow of the Society for the Psychological Study of Social Issues (2004)
- Fellow of the American Psychological Association (2005)
- Elected member of the Society of Multivariate Experimental Psychology
- Algernon Sydney Sullivan Award, Duke University (2017)

== Books ==
- Hoyle, R. H. (Ed.). Structural equation modeling: Concepts, issues, and applications. Sage Publications (1995).
- Hoyle, R. H. (Ed.). Statistical strategies for small sample research. Sage Publications (1999).
- Hoyle, R. H.; Kernis, M. H.; Leary, M. R.; & Baldwin, M. W. Selfhood: Identity, esteem, regulation. Westview Press (1999).
- Hoyle, R. H.; Harris, M. J.; & Judd, C. M. Research methods in social relations (7th ed.). Wadsworth Publishing (2002).
- Leary, M. R.; & Hoyle, R. H. (Eds.). Handbook of individual differences in social behavior. Guilford Press (2009).
- Hoyle, R. H. (Ed.). Handbook of personality and self-regulation. Blackwell (2010).
- Hoyle, R. H. Structural equation modeling for social and personality psychology. Sage Publications (2011).
- Hoyle, R. H. (Ed.). Handbook of structural equation modeling. Guilford Press (2012).
- Hoyle, R. H. (Ed.). Handbook of structural equation modeling (2nd ed.). Guilford Press (2023).
