= Sex and gender differences in leadership =

Sex and gender differences in leadership have been studied from a variety of perspectives, including personality traits, sex and gender roles, and intersectional identities, to name a few. Scholars from fields such as leadership studies, management, psychology, and sociology have taken interest. The terms sex and gender, and their definitions, have been used inconsistently and sometimes interchangeably in the leadership and management fields, leading to some confusion. Most scholarship has explored topics relating to women and leadership, rather than to men, intersex people, or transgender or non-binary people.

Scholars have noted the importance of understanding women's leadership because research has shown that while women are less likely to emerge as leaders than men, women have been found to be more effective in many contexts. Significant organizational potential is lost when qualified women are underrepresented in leadership positions. Scholars also see an ethical imperative to close the gender pay gap, reduce discrimination, overcome gender stereotypes, and improve material outcomes for all women.

Major topics of interest have included leadership traits, behaviors and styles, leader emergence, and leader effectiveness. Studies reveal patterns of sex and gender differences in leadership that occur as average overall effects, with overlap between men and women. A variety of situational, cultural, and individual variables affect the results of studies, as do time periods, which makes it difficult to summarize overall differences. Stereotypes about men and women can make it difficult to determine actual versus perceived differences. Sex and gender discrimination against women, stigma toward nonbinary and trans people, and simplification of men and masculinities play large roles in shaping perceptions of leadership and gender, as well as in leaders' internal conceptions of themselves. Academic research has focused on Western models of leadership using English-speaking participants, which has greatly limited understanding. Scholars have charted several research agendas for further investigation into barriers to women's leadership; cultural differences; and the effect of virtual work environments, as well as expanding study of gender to include trans, nonbinary, and men's leadership.

== Underrepresentation of women leaders ==
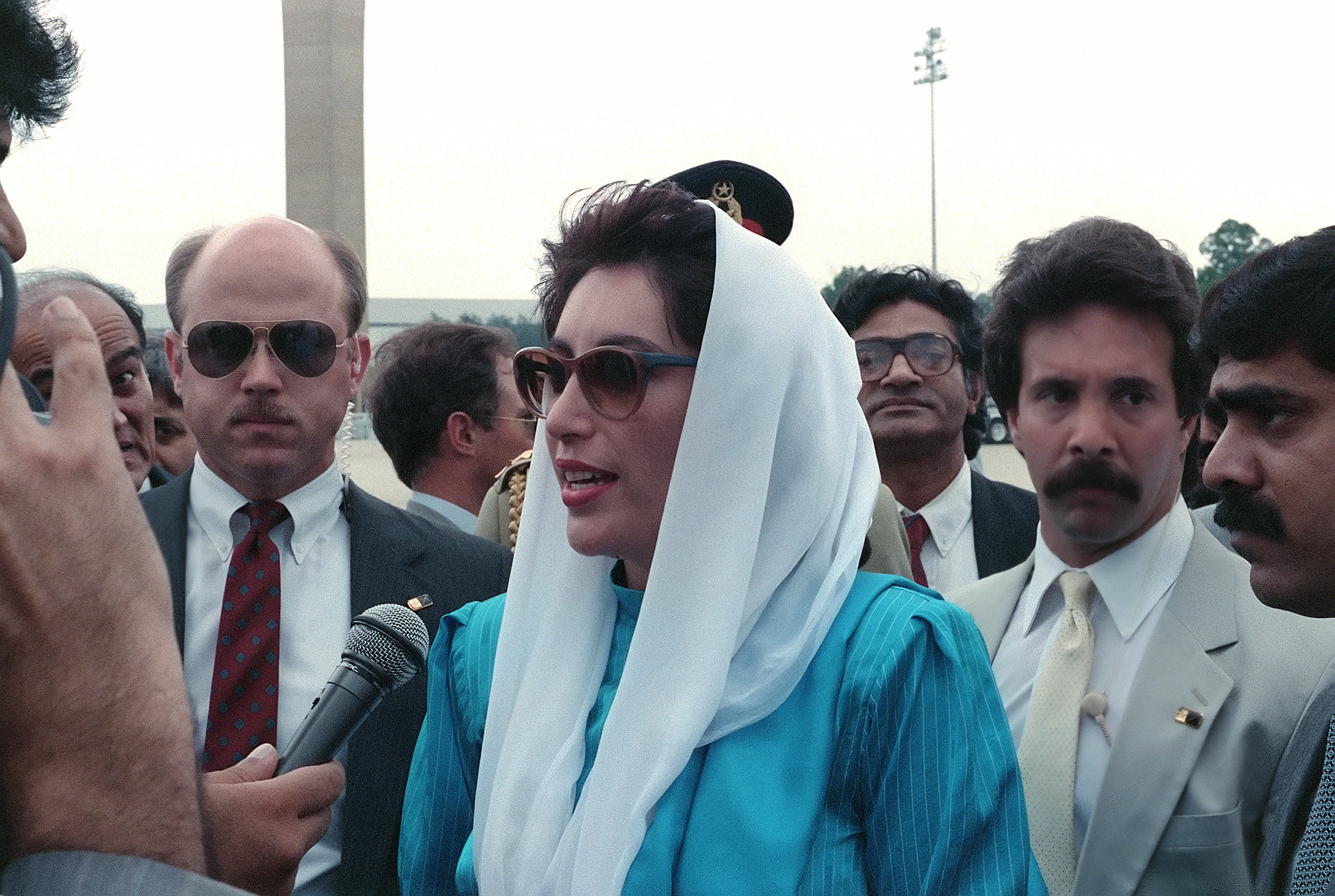
Benazir Bhutto, 1989, first democratically elected female leader of a Muslim-majority country

Women are underrepresented in leadership positions. Studies over the past twenty years show that as one looks higher in management hierarchies, the proportion of women decreases, especially in private-sector jobs. A 2022 study by LeanIn and McKinsey & Company, which surveyed over 40,000 employers, found that 60% of managers and 74% of C-suite executives were men. Several studies show women "are less likely than similarly qualified men to obtain jobs with higher social and monetary rewards … and to gain access to positions of power" and earn less for equivalent work, "even after adjusting for education and preferences for full-time employment." The representation and compensation of gender-diverse leaders is unknown due to lack of research.

The term glass ceiling refers to women's restricted access to managerial levels. Studies suggest that sex discrimination against women leaders may best be explained by viewing relevant social systems as inherently gendered, rather than focusing individual situations and personal attributes.

A glass ceiling is also apparent in leadership positions in education. While women accounted for 81% of care centre and preschool leaders in selected OECD countries, they made up only 16% of primary school principals in francophone Africa. Across 70 upper-middle- and high-income countries, there is a 20-percentage-point gap between the share of female teachers and the share of female secondary school principals.

In addition, women hold only 30% of leadership roles in higher education globally. In some Arab and Asian countries, their share falls below 10%.

Ministers of Education are also predominantly male: only 27% of education and higher education ministers were women between 2010 and 2023. All education ministers were male until 2014 in France, Mauritius and Myanmar. Ukraine appointed its first female education minister only in 2016.

The glass ceiling metaphor has led to further research into "glass walls" and "glass cliffs." Glass walls describe the unequal distribution of women and men across occupations, particularly between "line" jobs, which are central to providing organizational products and services and are dominated by men, and "staff" jobs, which are more peripheral and offer fewer opportunities for promotion. The glass cliff phenomenon refers to "the tendency for women to be more likely than men to be appointed to risky or precarious leadership positions, encapsulated by the phrase "think crisis—think female".

Scholars have explored why women remain underrepresented in leadership roles. Women continue to face a gender pay gap and often have less human capital compared to men. Although men are doing more housework and childcare than in the past, women still spend more time on these responsibilities, which can take away from their work time. A systematic review found that men may have access to valuable social networks that women do not, giving them valuable access to institutional knowledge, technical knowledge, and connections to decision makers. Culturally and linguistically-diverse women leaders face additional barriers to success and receive less support for career development.

Policy makers and the general public sometimes suggest gender underrepresentation is determined by women's preferences. However, choice and discrimination are not mutually exclusive. Women's preferences are shaped by cultural and social norms, gender biases of teachers and parents, and the emotional and nonverbal reactions they experience throughout adulthood. A meta-analysis revealed no gender difference between adult men and women in similar occupations regarding their desire for leadership, promotions, or autonomy. There are also no gender differences found in commitment to their careers or organizations. However, motherhood and corresponding steps to reduce work demands are sometimes seen as signs of low organizational commitment. Women report a greater desire for job flexibility. While men are more likely to quit jobs overall, women are more likely to do so for family reasons.

The industries, organizations, and companies where women work influence the representation of women leaders. Women face less bias in education but more in the field of law. Women entrepreneurs tend to struggle more than men, possibly because they are more likely to decline to work long hours and are stereotyped as less willing to take risks. Male-dominated contexts, whether at the industry or company level, also disadvantage women, due to tokenism, stereotypes about lack of fit, and exclusion from informal networks.

Leadership opportunities and women's representation in leadership are expanding. The proportion of women leaders is increasing, and attitudes about women as leaders are becoming more supportive. In the United States, people's attitudes toward the idea of a woman as president, willingness to work for a female boss, and women leaders in general are more positive than in the past. And in the United States as early as 2002, most adults believe men and women should have equal responsibility for childcare. However, leadership roles still show occupational gender segregation, with women concentrated in "feminine" leadership roles such as human resources, and in "feminine" sectors like health, social work, and education. Men, on the other hand, are "concentrated in 'strategic' areas like research and development, profit and loss, and operations." Therefore, progress in resolving the underrepresentation is women is industry-dependent.

== Discrimination and stereotypes ==
Women and gender-diverse leaders frequently face discrimination on their leadership journeys. Decades of research have found that women are "given less access to training, poorer performance evaluation, and fewer organizational rewards" than similarly qualified men. In education, decisions over who should be hired as a school principal risks being gender-biased where selection panels are dominated by men. Studies also reveal high discrimination against women in more senior roles that offer higher status and wages, and "against both sexes when they applied for jobs dominated by the other sex." Organizational culture and structure have been shown to create more challenges for women than men. Women's typically greater domestic responsibilities, time spent away from paid work, limited networking and mentoring opportunities, and the masculine orientation of many workplace cultures create second-generation bias barriers for women.

A major factor in discrimination against women leaders is perceptions of their competence. Stereotype-based biases lead to assumptions of women's incompetence affecting their recruitment, selection, and performance appraisal and compensation decisions. Even when controlling for quality of performance, women leaders and managers receive lower evaluations than their male counterparts Unless in a feminine setting, women must display "greater evidence of skill than men to be considered equally competent." Studies show that women exert more influence with men when they demonstrate lower levels of competence; men are more influenced by other men than equally competent women; and men preferred to hire male over female applicants with equal or superior job qualifications.

Gender-diverse leaders, especially leaders of color, face transphobic discrimination, harassment, assault, barriers to advancement, non-inclusive policies, binary expectations, isolation, silencing, stigma, and microaggressions. African American trans men leaders often stay closeted to avoid dual discrimination based both on both their trans identities and Black male stereotypes.

=== Stereotypes ===
Stereotypes about men, women, and leadership contribute to discrimination. Studies within two major frameworks, Heilman's lack of fit model and role congruity theory, provide strong evidence that people are prejudiced against women leaders because stereotypes about women do not match with those about leaders, especially in jobs and fields considered to be male. Leadership is often seen as a masculine trait, especially by men, although less so in educational organizations and moderate-status leader roles.

Heilman's lack of fit model explains how descriptive stereotypes about women influence perceptions about their leadership. Motherhood status and physical attractiveness increase perceptions of women's incompetence. In contexts where women are rare, stereotypes are amplified, making it less likely for women to be selected for opportunities or promoted.

In fields stereotyped as male, such as upper-level management, the military, STEM fields, and entrepreneurship, women are seen as incongruent with the context and are evaluated more negatively than men. Evaluators are less likely to rate women highly when criteria are vague, such as "resilient" or "forward-thinking." In male-dominated contexts, evaluators are also more likely to downgrade women whose performance has declined, and less likely to upgrade them when they improve.

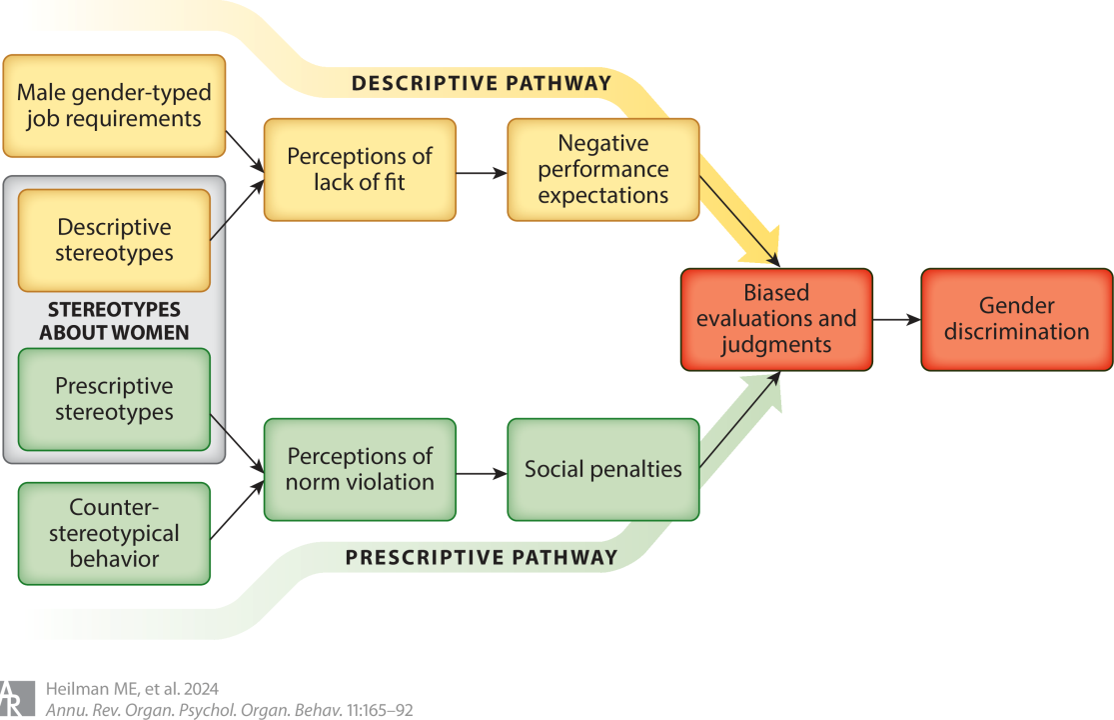
Pathways from stereotypes about women to gender bias and discrimination

Figure reproduced from Heilman, Caleo, & Manzi, 2024 under the Creative Commons Attribution 4.0 International License.

Prescriptive stereotypes, on the other hand, dictate how women and men leaders should and should not behave. For example, traits like dominance, insensitivity, ambition, assertive, and emotional displays of anger and pride are considered "off-limits for women." At the same time, women are penalized for not engaging in stereotypical feminine behaviors like care, altruism and agreeableness.

Women who defy these prescriptive stereotypes face several disadvantages, including lower chances of recruitment, less favorable negotiation outcomes, diminished influence, limited access to social networks, and worse salary recommendations. Additionally, women are penalized simply for being successful in fields that are not traditionally associated with their gender.

Stereotypes have also been studied within a framework of agency and communion. The agency and communion model is widely used and validated, and seems to apply across different cultures. Agency includes qualities like task orientation, goal achievement, assertiveness, and dominance. Communion is said to encompass kindness, warmth, helpfulness, concern for others, and building relationships.

Research has shown that people associate agentic traits most readily with male leaders. Successful managers are often believed to have more agentic than communal qualities. When women take charge and act with agency, followers may resist them because they are seen as lacking communion. Discrimination against women who lack communion is more severe in male-dominated domains. In these fields, highly successful women are judged to have less desirable personalities than men in the same occupation.

Women leaders face a double bind. They must "balance the demand for agency required of the leader role and the demand for communion required of the female role." Highly communal leaders may be criticized for not being agentic enough, while "highly agentic female leaders may be criticized for lacking communion.". Despite the increasing value placed on communal leadership behaviors, women are often advised to "retain elements of a masculine leadership style" in order to match stereotypes about leaders.

Researchers have found that both men and women face negative leadership stereotypes. Men are stereotyped as being arrogant, aggressive, egotistical, and controlling for men, while women are judged to be passive, insecure, compliant, and impressionable. Women who are seen as self-promoting are seen as less deserving of recognition and are less influential and likeable. However, if a woman's success can be attributed to external factors, such as an accident, following someone else's suggestion, or providing a communal justification, the penalty for violating gender norms is reduced.

Patterns of discrimination against women leaders are changing as ideas about leadership evolve to become more communal, collaborative, and relationship-oriented. Modern leadership now often includes democratic relationships, participatory decision-making, delegation, and team-based skills, which are seen as less masculine. The stereotype of leadership as masculine has also decreased over time, especially among male research participants.

Women's personalities have become more aligned with leadership traits like assertiveness and dominance. By 2000, women's desire for authority began to match that of men. Research also shows an increase in the belief that men and women have equal competence. However, perceptions of women's agency are slower to change, with studies showing increased recognition of women's communal traits but not their agency.

Stereotypes about male leaders have been less frequently researched. Leadership scholars have begun engaging with gender studies to explore different kinds of masculinity, rather than assuming a universal construct of manhood. They are also paying more attention to how masculinity intersects with race and other social identities in leadership contexts, which often reveals stereotypes about male leaders.

Trans and nonbinary leaders whose gender is accepted by others are likely to face that gender's stereotypes. Predominantly female work spaces are more welcoming to trans women than male settings. White trans men may experience greater privilege in male-dominated environments. but some in predominantly female environments have reported being considered patriarchal or even less intelligent. Gender-diverse leaders must also navigate assumptions of cis and heteronormativity, as well as stigma and marginalization, that create stereotype-like effects.

There hasn't been enough research with trans and non-binary leaders to describe changes in discrimination against their leadership. However, in the United States, sympathies toward gender-diverse people grow as more people personally get to know a trans or non-binary person. Despite these signs of social progress, there are extensive legislative efforts against trans people. Attitudes toward trans and non-binary people vary widely in other countries.

== Historiography and conceptual approaches ==
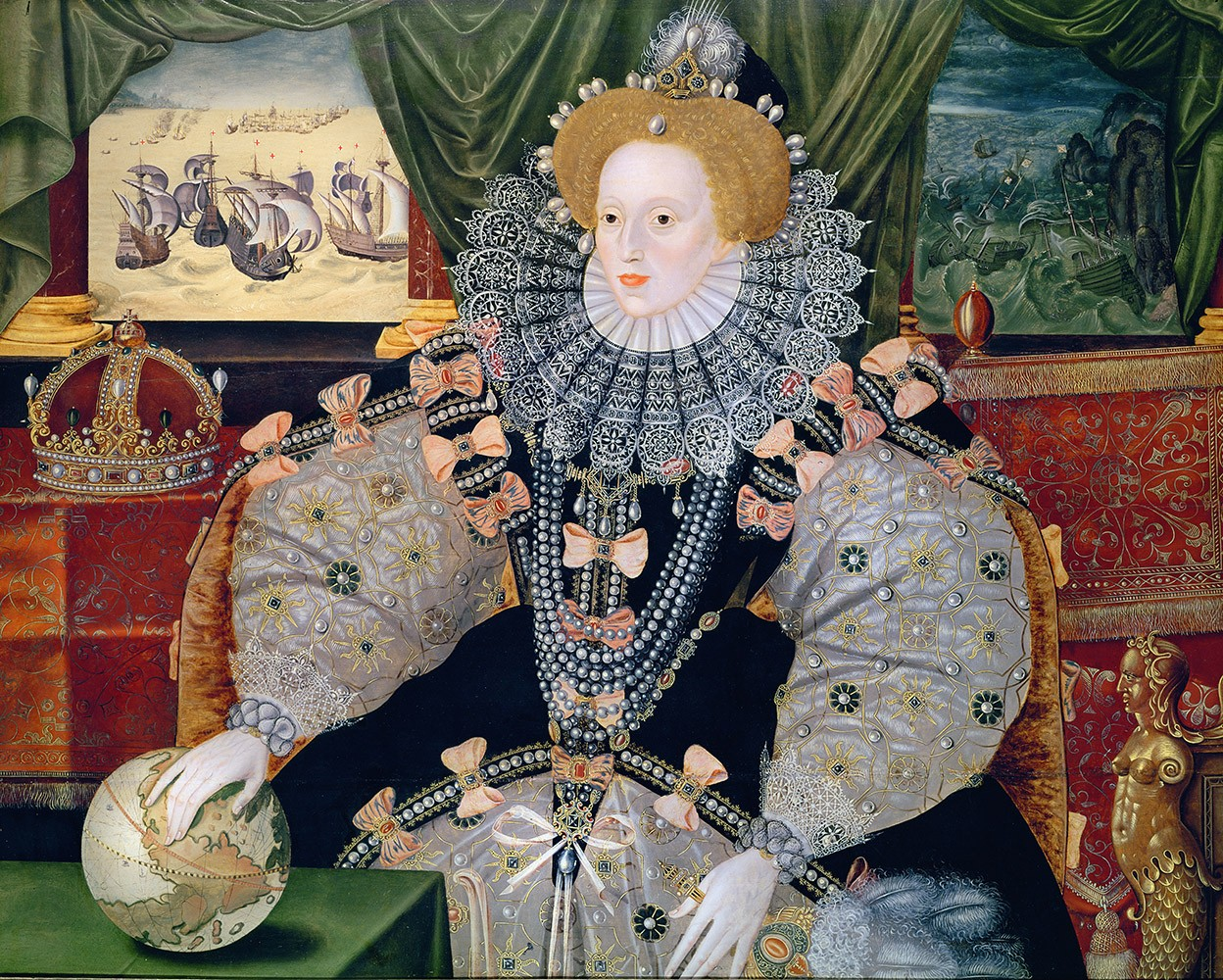
Armada Portrait of Elizabeth I who stated 'I know I have the body but of a weak and feeble woman; but I have the heart and stomach of a king, and of a king of England too.'

Academic approaches to studying sex, gender, and leadership have evolved significantly over the decades. Early influential works include Edwin I. Megargee's 1969 article on gender difference in leader emergence, and Virginia Schein's 1973 article "Think Manager-Think Male" on gendered stereotypes. However, gender was hardly discussed in the 1981 and 1990 editions of what would become The Bass Handbook of Leadership.

Most research has focused on women rather than men or other genders. For instance, the 2008 edition of the Bass Handbook includes a chapter titled "Women as Leaders and Followers." This focus on women is a response to how Western cultures have viewed and conceptualized leadership as a masculine construct, where men are assumed to be leaders. The civil rights and feminist movements, along with the increasing presence of women in the workforce, spurred research interest in women's leadership. Scholars have recently been encouraging their fields to update definitions of sex to include people whose bodies are not "strictly female or male" or who are from cultures that do not have a binary distinction, as well as nonbinary and trans people other social identities.

Before women were included in leadership studies, research primarily focused on white men in formal leadership positions, which ignored women who had less formal roles in activism, community services, and the home. In all timeframes, corporate leaders are given the most attention.

Most research has been conducted in Western countries with English-speaking participants. This has led to an underrepresentation of culturally and linguistically diverse women leaders in English-language literature. Studies often involve college students and laboratory settings, with some findings only emerging in lab contexts. Results from organizational studies vary widely by industry, and many studies rely on self-report and perceptual data rather than observed behaviors.

The study of gender and leadership frequently lacks a theoretical foundation. In a systematic review, Buss et al. found that 48% of articles did not explicitly state a theoretical perspective, and only 35% mentioned a theory specific to gender. Leadership research has also often failed to examine gender as a lived experience and as situated within social structures.

A major issue in interpreting the extensive research on gender and leadership is that while individual studies may show meaningful differences, meta-analyses often find much smaller effect sizes or ambiguous and contradictory conclusions when considering gender across various contexts and research subjects. Authors of an extensive literature concluded that "a large proportion of the studies on female leadership rely on correlational data," which means they are unable to make causal claims and are susceptible to endogeneity issues, where the effect of one variable on another "cannot be interpreted because it includes omitted causes".

Recent research agendas call for addressing these gaps by incorporating findings from studies involving leaders of color, non-Western cultures, and LGBT individuals. There is no longer a consensus that sex is dimorphic and gender is recognized as a construct that can be fluid and complex. At the same time, scholars note that women's unique experiences should continue to be a focus in leadership research, as there are still major barriers to their emergence and representation.

The following sections will outline the main conceptual approaches scholars have used to study leadership, presented in roughly chronological order.

== Trait-based ==
Some research has explored differences in men's and women's leadership from a trait-based perspective, rooted in evolutionary psychology. Bass summarizes the vast research from the 1970s and 1980s; scholars explored differences in men's and women's personalities, communication skills, cognitive skills, socioemotional skills, thinking processes, reactions to conflict and feedback, achievement orientation, self-confidence, and moral values.

Critics of this approach assert that traits have "low explanatory and predictive power" especially when it comes to organizational effectiveness and leader success. The actions of leaders are more relevant to the question than traits they might possess. Scholars also debate the extent to which personality research findings can be generalized to non-Western cultures. Other scholars have noted that sex is sometimes treated as a proxy for underlying variables. While this approach has thus become less popular among scholars, it has been used in several recent studies in conjunction with the Big Five personality characteristics.

== Sex roles ==
Some researchers, not content to simply describe sex differences, began to explore the underlying nature of these differences and looked to culturally-developed sex roles for answers. In a systematic review by Buss et al. (2024), 60% of articles used this type of approach.

In the early days of this approach, sex and gender were often used interchangeably and deemed a "fixed characteristic of an individual, rather than a socially produced structure" even if these characteristics were caused by socialization differences rather than biological differences between men and women. Some scholars believe that both biology (e.g., hormones) as well as psychology facilitate role development and performance.

Early research used bi-polar masculine-feminine scales, meaning that research questions allowing an individual to possess both masculine and feminine attributes were impossible. Even after masculine-feminine scales were separated, they still assumed that "masculine" and "feminine" were the only two gendered categories, and that one could define these categories in a way that crossed cultural identities and language.

From this approach, inequality in leadership attainment is deemed to be caused by society's gendered social structure. Role congruity theory was developed to try to examine (among other things), gender differences in organizational contexts and which conditions evoke these differences and alter their outcomes. Despite the advances made using role congruity theory, looking to sex roles often led to interventions aimed at 'fixing the women' so they could keep up with men.

Scholars have criticized the approach as imposing masculine norms on women, expecting them to adopt men's ways of leading. Also, this wave of research tended to overlook systemic factors that perpetuate gender inequality. Nevertheless, this perspective provided helpful initial insights for explaining gender disadvantage, as well as pragmatic advice for women seeking to advance. Some scholars distinguish between the scholarship of women's leadership and the scholarship of women and leadership, rejecting the former as not reflective of the diverse experiences of women. Ratner, women and leadership honors the fact that all leaders are gendered and navigate social systems.

== Androgynous leadership ==
An early paradigm in the study of gender and leadership used bipolar masculinity-femininity scales, which did not allow them to vary independently but forced them to act as opposites. In 1979, the Bem Sex Role Inventory allowed respondents to rate or be rated on both dimensions, that is, to have both high masculinity and high femininity. Still, Bem equated sex-role and biological sex. In 1996, Park proposed a model of androgynous leadership, where androgyny was defined as "the combined presence of socially valued, stereotypic, feminine and masculine characteristics." Park's model continued threads from sex-role approach including that "sex-role identity is formed, influenced or changed by various factors such as social learning conditions, reinforcement, and maturational changes in thinking processes which depend on the antecedents of sex-role identity." For Park, masculine aligned with task orientation and feminine aligned with relations orientation. Park argued that the most effective leaders and managers will exhibit "the best qualities of both masculine and feminine leadership styles." as they are able to offer a "broad repertoire of responses" in response to situational demands. Park urged scholars to explore combine trait-based and situational leadership approaches with future research.

Hardaker and colleagues reviewed the research that emerged and found "a growing preference for androgynous leaders," that is, for male leaders to become more communal and female leaders to become more agentic. A challenge for researchers using the androgynous model is that the qualities ascribed to women are shifting and expanding. Are women becoming more "androgynous" or does the model break down as scholars allow for more complexity in definitions of gender and leadership.

Research with transgender leaders is offering additional perspective on androgynous leadership. A study with transgender leaders found they demonstrated fluency with both masculine and feminine styles and drew from behaviors learned in previous gender socializations. As they do so, trans leaders report making trade-offs between their preferred leadership style and the risk of being misgendered if that style doesn't align with their perceived gender. Scholars suggest that future research explore how gender-diverse leaders categorize their own behaviors according to internal gender identity as well as external gender perceptions.

== The "female advantage" ==
In response to calls for women to ask more masculine, scholars began to investigate the positive attributes of feminine leadership behaviors and women's leadership. The "female advantage" approach promoted the idea that femininity should "should not be eliminated, but rather, celebrated." The approach was first promulgated in a landmark article by Alice Eagly and Linda Carli in 2003 and reviewed and re-affirmed by them in 2014. Advantages put forth include the ways that women's leadership style, values and attitudes, and ethics differ from men's in ways that support effective leadership and organizational success. Several studies have shown women to use transformational behaviors more than men. Scholars have also found the trait of emotional intelligence to correlate with effective leadership, and for women to exhibit this trait more strongly than men. Research has also explored potential leadership advantages related to women's values and attitudes, personal ethics, and found advantages for women, "at least in some contexts." The increasing presence of women leaders has also been shown to have positive effects on societal outcomes such as gender equality.

Scholars share concerns with this approach. First, the use of feminine stereotypes as a basis for investigation may not lead to actual value for women leaders, may penalize them for not living up to stereotypes, and may reinforce binary gender stereotypes. Second, this approach suggests a common experience for all women, oversimplifying diverse realities. The authors of the original model acknowledge continue to emphasize the importance of studying stereotypes in order to overcome them; for informing organizational policies and culture that "make organizations as welcoming to women as to men," and for highlighting women's alignment with the increasing need for change. Still, this approach is valuable for raising the visibility of valued qualities demonstrated by women leaders.

== Gender complexity ==
Recent approaches find scholars questioning the assignment of behaviors and traits to specific genders. Three recent leadership theories explore this complexity: paradoxical leadership, inclusive leadership, and intersectionality leadership. Paradoxical leadership indicates "the most effective leadership integrates both agentic and communal behaviors," which may offer more opportunities for women and gender-diverse leaders, but could also imply a greater expectation on them. Both women and men are increasingly expected to be inclusive leaders. Trans and non-binary leaders are often motivated to practice inclusive leadership by their own experiences with marginalization. Intersectional leadership emphasizes the way that social identities, including gender, combine in unique ways to influence leadership. Lines of research explore specific experiences such as Black caring male leaders and Black women's transformational leadership. For example, in North America, Asian leaders in are perceived as more "feminine" and Black leaders to be more "masculine." Gender and age have also been found to intersect. The intersection of gender and sexual orientation with leadership raises issues such as identity disclosure, stigma, group composition, and the importance of situational factors. Theories of gender complexity may offer richer understanding of complexity theories of leadership as well as complexity of lived experiences.

Contemporary leadership scholars also study men and masculinity as gender variables relevant to leadership. Historically, men were not studied as gendered leaders, because they been so dominant—the default. Scholars have noted that male leaders demonstrate many forms of masculinity. Studies with male leaders of color and gay men have shown that default assumptions about masculine leadership don't hold up for all other social identities. Significant research has studied how the social construction of masculinity influences "how men experience education environments and engage in leadership learning.

Across these approaches, certain topics have proved popular with scholars, to be discussed in the following sections.

== Major areas of study ==
=== Leadership and personality traits ===
Relationships between leadership, gender, and personality traits have been studied for many years, despite the concerns raised about the trait-based approach. A confounding factor is determining which traits relate to effective leadership. Topics of intense interest in the 1980s included differences in men's and women's communication skills, ways of thinking, emotional skills, personality, reactions to conflict and feedback, and self-confidence. Carli and Eagly summarized research findings that men demonstrate more aggression, assertiveness, dominance, and "to a very slight degree," competitiveness, but note that successful contemporary leadership now requires abilities "to form good relationships with others, work in diverse teams, and influence and motive others to make valuable and creative contributions." Offerman and Foley reported that "women as a group may have a leadership advantage in terms of enhanced extraversion, agreeableness, and conscientiousness, while having a disadvantage in their higher neuroticism." Carli and Eagly conclude, "neither gender has a leadership advantage in personality" and Shen and Joseph similarly assert that it is unclear whether men and women leaders differ in leadership-related skills.

The leadership traits of trans and nonbinary leaders have not yet been studied directly. However, in looking at their leadership experiences, researchers have identified some common patterns in how these leaders overcome discrimination and done work to understand their identities in the context of society. Studies repeatedly find these patterns of experience create self-confidence, self-awareness, resilience, humility, and empathy in gender-diverse leaders.

Many studies have also investigated implicit leadership theories—the traits that people think leaders should have, as well as what traits followers prefer. A longitudinal study with U.S. samples from 1994 and 2014 found that people, especially men, continue to believe masculine traits are best for leadership. There are signs of change, however. A longitudinal study investigated preferences of Dutch employees for masculine and feminine leadership traits at three time points (2005, 2010, 2020). Results aligned with a previous study with two cohorts of U.S. business students (2018 and 2021) showing preference for feminine leadership traits is increasing, while preference for masculine traits is decreasing. Masculine traits were shown as preferred overall in 2020 in the longitudinal study, however, while the study with US students found overall preference for feminine traits. Both studies concluded that the stereotype of a "good manager" is becoming less gendered. Researchers note that the area of trait preferences is especially dominated by studies of men and women without consideration of other social identities such as race, which, when considered, add significant nuance to people's expectations and preferences.

=== Leadership behaviors and leadership styles ===
Extensive research has been conducted on the differences between men's and women's leadership behaviors. as well as the use of leadership styles, which are models of behavioral patterns. Paustian-Underdahl and colleagues describe the numerous methodological and theoretical challenges in researching gender and leadership behaviors and styles.

In the 1970s and 80s, studies found that women tended to use more participative leadership styles while men were more directive. Two major meta-analyses showed women leaders adopt more democratic leadership styles, are more interpersonally oriented, and use less autocratic leadership styles compared to men.

As researchers grew more focused on the concepts of agency and communion in their study of gender and leadership, behaviors were categorized accordingly. Communal leadership behaviors included ethical, moral, relational, consideration, idealized influence, individualized consideration, intellectual stimulation, democratic, and participative behaviors. Agentic leadership behaviors included contingent reward, task-oriented, initiating structure, active management-by-exception, autocratic, directive leaders. Some behaviors are considered gender neutral, such as inspirational motivation, passive management-by-exception, and laissez-faire leadership. A meta-analysis found women were rated more highly than men on effective communal behaviors, and more highly than men on two agentic behaviors: contingent reward and task-oriented / initiating structure. Women were also rated more highly on inspirational motivation, categorized as gender-neutral. Men were rated higher than women on the gender-neutral behavior passive management-by-exception, especially in newer studies.

Meta-analyses have shown women use transformational leadership behaviors somewhat more than men. This might be because transformational leadership includes both agentic and communal behaviors, which helps reduce the role incongruity between leadership roles and female stereotypes Women are often rated more highly than men on idealized influence, individualized consideration, and contingent reward, These findings were replicated in a study by different authors. men are more likely to use laissez-faire leadership and two components of transactional leadership: active management-by-exception, and passive management-by-exception. Although some of the effect sizes were small, effects can have significant consequences when observed and acted upon over long periods .

There is less evidence regarding other leadership styles. Women tend to exhibit more charismatic leadership compared to men, even though charismatic traits are often stereotypically attributed to men. Women are also expected to show higher levels of servant leadership (Beck, 2014; Hogue, 2016), and those who use this style tend to have better effects on performance outcomes than men. Paradoxical leadership, which combines different gendered aspects, provides more opportunities to women. Men rated themselves as higher on destructive leadership behaviors and Machiavellian traits than women. Abusive supervision is seen as less typical among women, and such behaviors are less often attributed women's internal characteristics.

Some leadership styles have received almost no attention that reviewers suggest are worthy of study from a gender perspective: Instrumental Leadership, inclusive leadership, intersectionality leadership, and virtual work leadership.

Several studies have examined the leadership styles of trans and nonbinary leaders, specifically androgynous, authentic, synergistic, and transformational leadership. Leaders who transition genders mid-career often draw from previous gender socializations and may practice androgynous leadership. However, they may need to balance their preferred style with the risk of being misgendered due to stereotypes. Trans and nonbinary leaders may experience increased personal authenticity with their teams if they come out at work, but a decreased sense of leadership authenticity if their gender does not align with traditional gender binary assumptions.

In a study on transformational leadership, Serjoie found that transgender leaders demonstrated strengths in intellectual stimulation, "emphasizing their role in challenging the status quo and inspiring alternative strategies," as well as idealized influence behaviors, outscoring both men and women in the study.

Scholars have suggested further research on the leadership styles of gender-diverse leaders, particularly in relation to outcomes and effectiveness. Gender-diverse leaders' displays of empathy and follower-orientation indicate potential for exploring servant and followership leadership styles. However, trans and nonbinary leaders do not always relate their gender to their leadership style or achievements.

A few studies on specific populations have found no sex differences in leadership styles or behaviors. A study of Swedish school administrators, insurance officials, and vicars found small differences in decision-making style, but no overall gender differences. A study of German business students' perceptions of their leaders' transformational behaviors and found no significant differences for leader gender. These studies illustrate the relevance of contextual factors such as organizational type and gender distribution of employees, as well as the importance of looking at behaviors rather than large theoretical constructs.

=== Leadership emergence ===
Scholars describe leader emergence as "the process through which an individual becomes influential to relevant others in a manner that involves the implicit or explicit granting of the leader role." Research into the emergence of women leaders has included consideration of traits and surface-level characteristics, follower attributions and perceptions, leader behaviors, and contextual factors.

One of the earliest studies with college students found that women were less likely to emerge as leaders even when their personalities were more dominant, due to "social role conflict.". A meta-analysis in 1991 found male leaders were more likely to emerge in short-term and task-oriented groups, while women emerged slightly more often than men in groups requiring social facilitation. When considering only the most recent five years of studies, this gender gap was shown to be shrinking. Modern studies through 2020 show mixed or small gender differences in the emergence of leaders.

Related to leadership emergence is an individual's motivation to lead. A summary of research through 2015 reported that women across cultures and professions have a lower motivation to lead than do men. Scholars reported similar findings for trans women college students. The results of three studies suggest that for cis women, decreased motivation stems from traditional gender role beliefs and lack of same-sex role models, and that when women have a high awareness of gender inequality, their motivation to lead is also higher. In 2020, a meta-analysis found that nuances of motivation matter. While men score higher on an intrinsic desire and a feeling of duty to lead, women score higher on motivations to lead for non-selfish reasons.

Research with trans and nonbinary leaders show that their leader emergence relates to followers' acceptance of their claims about their gender. Trans leaders report the attributes of their bodies affected leader emergence in a variety of ways, including their voices. While some trans men who transitioned at work note increases in privilege as they were accepted as masculine, trans women report being expected to conform to feminine norms in order to be accepted as a woman leader after transition. Black trans man leaders noted prejudice against their skin color meant they generally stayed closeted until they could change organizations and begin anew with their new gender identity.

Leaders who come out as a different gender mid-career may need to re-emerge as leaders as followers have a variety of actions related to disclosure of gender identity. The leader emergence of trans and nonbinary leaders who stay closeted is hindered by anxiety and stress and leaders may adopt behaviors that don't feel natural to them. Trans leaders who transition fully before taking a new leadership position may deem their trans identity irrelevant to their leadership.

Social identity theory describes barriers to leader emergence for people who do not fit in-group prototypes, which may include trans and nonbinary people in cisnormative contexts. Trans and nonbinary leaders have been able to leverage their skills with adaptation, situational discernment, group-oriented actions, and the "empathy, resilience, courage, and gratitude developed as part of their identity journeys" in order to form strong relational identities with their group that helped them emerge. Gender-diverse leaders also find that gender differences matter less in gender-diverse environments or where their identities are more prototypical of the group; for example, with activist organizations and with inclusive churches.

Scholars have found some traits more important for women's leadership emergence then they are for men. The quality of resilience enables women to "overcome crises more efficiently, recover from setbacks more quickly, and adapt to changing conditions more rapidly." Competitiveness and achievement orientation are also correlated with women's emergence as leaders.

The presence of top women leaders can have a positive influence on the emergence of other women leaders in top and middle-management positions. Top women leaders tend to create more female-friendly cultures and supportive human resource policies, and can serve as positive role models for aspiring women leaders. Women's mentoring, networking, and coaching of other women leaders, as well as women's professional organizations, also supports women's entry to leadership. However, research has also found a phenomenon known as "queen bee," where some women leaders may share stereotypical biases against women and legitimize gender inequality. These women prioritize their individual success and distance themselves from emerging women.

The glass cliff phenomenon refers to "the tendency for women to be more likely than men to be appointed to leadership positions that are risky and precarious" or "think crisis—think female." In a review of ten years of research, Ryan and colleagues found this phenomenon to be "nuanced and context-dependent," dependent on factors such as "the ways in which organizational performance is indexed," selection bias, gender stereotypes, and the strategic need for organizational change. They found evidence that glass cliffs arise when a scapegoat is needed or when the issues at hand relate to people and personnel, and not when the crisis requires leaders to act as spokesperson or improve performance. Women are also deemed more suitable in a crisis when the leader will be confronting challenges alone and social resources are absent. With such variability, Ryan and colleagues concluded, "there is nothing inevitable about their occurrence and there is no sense in which they are an ineluctable product either of psychology, of biology, or for that matter business life." A 2024 systematic review also found that while there is a belief that women leaders are better crisis managers, findings are context-dependent and conclusive evidence about an overall effect is lacking.

Scholars encourage future studies about women's and gender diverse leader emergence that explore the cultivation of resilience, achievement orientation, and self-confidence. Studies with trans and nonbinary leaders point to the need for additional research about how coming out and gender transition processes affect leader emergence, as well as the development of strategies to overcome barriers identified by social-identity theory, such as stigma and in-group bias.

=== Leader effectiveness ===
Scholars have investigated differences in men's and women's leader effectiveness from a variety of conceptual approaches, including performance evaluations, leadership styles, financial performance of firms, and other business outcomes. The approach and specific research questions matter a great deal, as meta analyses and reviews that look across unalike studies have mixed findings concerning effectiveness differences, depending on context and recency.

A 2014 meta-analysis of 99 studies from 1960 to 2011 found that men are seen as more effective in the oldest studies, and women are seen as more effective between 1982 and 2011. Evaluations by other people find that women are more effective leaders than men, especially in business and educational contexts and at mid-level and upper-level positions. Men are rated by others to be more effective in government organizations. On self-evaluations, men rate themselves more effective than women rate themselves. While studies conducted in laboratory settings show no significant differences between men's and women's leadership effectiveness, studies conducted in organizational settings suggest women are more effective.

Other research on leader effectiveness is linked to leadership styles, which in turn are linked to particular organizational conditions for success. Three meta-analyses showed that transformational leadership correlated strongly with effectiveness. The transformational leadership style and key behaviors were also shown to be more frequently used by women than men, indicating that women may have an effectiveness advantage.

Another way to evaluate effectiveness is financial performance, though studies of this kind are usually correlational in nature. For example, a 2015 report from the Conference Board showed that "Organizations in the top 20 percent of financial performance counted 37 percent of their leaders as women; among organizations in the bottom 20 percent, only 19 percent of leaders were women." Results also differ depending on the measure used for firm performance.

A meta-analysis found that sales performance correlates with the presence of women leaders, perhaps because "sales- and growth-focused organizations may be more open to non–status quo ideas and diverse persons compared to other types of organizations."

U.S. organizations with more women on boards of directors or in executive positions have been shown to have better financial outcomes. Similar findings were shown in a study of European companies. A widely-cited 2004 study by Catalyst found that companies with the highest representation of women on corporate boards reported better financial performance on return on equity and total return to shareholders. Scholars note that these types of studies are correlational and could indicate something about the organizations rather than the current leader; for example, perhaps companies who are "progressive enough to be promoting women into their top management teams" have an edge in selecting overall talent.

For some companies, socially responsible business practices are a primary indicator of their success. A meta-analysis across 87 independent samples and found that women have an advantage in socially responsible business practices and maintaining social reputation, especially in internationally operating organizations.

A 2024 literature review found no research directly investigating the effectiveness of trans or nonbinary leaders. However, there have been a few studies on the effectiveness of lesbian and gay leaders and interactions with gender.

== Gaps and future research ==
Researchers have identified several areas where more studies are needed. They suggest investigating how factors like age, race, ethnicity, socioeconomic status, and life stage interact with women's leadership. Additionally, there is a call for research from a cross-cultural perspective and about gender and global leadership.

It is important to continue focusing on the barriers to women's leadership. This includes understanding behaviors that help women avoid backlash for defying stereotypes. Studies should also explore what organizations can do to mitigate the effects of the unequal distributions of family and domestic responsibilities among women leaders and their spouses.

Scholars are advocating for new theoretical approaches. They recommend using more gender-inclusive methods that consider the less masculine paradigms of emotional, sensory, and reflexive dynamics. Researchers are encouraged to challenge the labelling of characteristics as masculine and feminine. There is also strong interest in studying critical masculinities in leadership, including diverse masculinities, power dynamics caring masculinity, and men's roles as allies for gender equality in leadership.

Future research should examine gender differences in leadership of virtual work settings, noting that women have been shown to have more positive attitudes toward using technology to communicate with coworkers, which aligns with participative leadership and socially-oriented communication. Social media and other online technologies can also facilitate informal leadership roles which intersect with gender-related behaviors such as interpersonal communication and community focused actions.
