= Monica Biernat =

American social psychologist

- Occupation: Professor of Psychology
- Awards: APA Distinguished Scientific Award for an Early Career Contribution (1998/1999)

Academic background
- Education: University of Michigan

Academic work
- Institutions: University of Kansas

Monica R. Biernat is a social psychologist known for her research on social judgment, stereotyping, prejudice, and discrimination. She is a University Distinguished Professor of Psychology at the University of Kansas.

Biernat is the author of the monograph Standards and Expectancies: Contrast and Assimilation in Judgments of Self and Others, and co-editor of the 2008 volume Commemorating Brown: The Social Psychology of Racism and Discrimination.

== Awards ==
Biernat received the American Psychological Association Distinguished Scientific Award for Early Career Contribution to Psychology in the area of Social Psychology in 1998/1999. The award citation emphasized her "outstanding, incisive research illuminating the linkage between social judgments and the perceiver’s subjective frame of reference." and "wide-ranging studies show[ing] how the judgments elicited by different target-individuals are partly determined by the target’s membership in an identifiable social group."

Biernat and her colleagues were awarded the Association for Women in Psychology Distinguished Publication Award in 2005 for their work on the volume The Maternal Wall: Research and Policy Perspectives Against Mothers. With Chris Crandall, Biernat was honored for Distinguished Service to the Society for Personality and Social Psychology (SPSP) in 2012. Biernat and Crandall co-edited the Society's newsletter; Biernat also served as SPSP's Council Representative (2001-2003), Member and Chair of the Convention Committee (2007-2009), and Secretary-Treasurer of the Organization (2010-2012).

== Biography ==
Biernat was born in 1963 and grew up in a Polish-Catholic neighborhood in Detroit, MI. She completed an A.B. degree in Psychology and Communication at University of Michigan in 1984. She continued her education at University of Michigan where she earned an M.A. in 1986 and Ph.D. in psychology (Social) in 1989, under the supervision of Melvin Manis. Her dissertation, titled Developing patterns of social judgment: Reliance on gender stereotypes vs. individuating information, tested participants ranging in age from kindergarten children to college students and found stability in their use of gender labels to make judgments about individuals.

Biernat was an assistant professor of psychology at the University of Florida (1989-1992) prior to joining the faculty of the University of Kansas in 1992. Her research has been supported by the National Science Foundation, National Institutes of Mental Health, and the United States Department of Justice.

Biernat was a Docking Faculty Scholar of the University of Kansas from 1999 to 2003. She was awarded the W. T. Kemper Fellowship for Teaching Excellence at University of Kansas in 2004. She received the Louise Byrd Graduate Educator Award from the University of Kansas in 2018, and was named the 2018 Mentor of the Year for her involvement with the McNair Scholars Program.

== Research ==
Biernat is perhaps best known for her work on social stereotypes. She received the Philip Brickman Memorial Prize (1987) for an earlier version of the paper Stereotypes on campus: How contact and liking influence perceptions of group distinctiveness. This paper explored the contact hypothesis – that interactions with members of a stereotyped group may lead to increase liking of the group, subsequently decreasing the strength of the stereotype.

Biernat is well known for her research on social stereotypes, and the widely cited model of shifting standards, which proposed that people tend to use category-specific standards to judge members of stereotyped groups. One of her recent studies examined social judgments and prejudice involving race. A student sent an email expressing interest in graduate training to more than 400 White professors: in some emails, the student used a Chinese name, Xian, and in others he used an Americanized name, Alex. More of the professors responded to student's request when email used the name Alex instead of Xian. Such findings suggest that faculty members may use cultural factors in judging graduate school applicants.

Biernat's co-authored paper “Coming out” among gay Latino and gay White men: implications of verbal disclosure for well-being," published in the journal Self and Identity, was named “best paper of the year” in 2016 by the International Society for Self and Identity (ISSI). This paper examined different rates of disclosure about sexual orientation among gay Latino and White men in relation to subjective well-being.

== Representative publications ==
- Biernat, M (2003). "Toward a Broader View of Social Stereotyping". American Psychologist. 58 (12): 1019–1027. doi:10.1037/0003-066x.58.12.1019. PMID 14664690.
- Biernat, M.; Fuegen, K. (2001). "Shifting standards and the evaluation of competence: Complexity in gender‐based judgment and decision making". Journal of Social Issues. 57 (4): 707–724. doi:10.1111/0022-4537.00237.
- Biernat, M.; Kobrynowicz, D. (1997). "Gender-and race-based standards of competence: lower minimum standards but higher ability standards for devalued groups". Journal of Personality and Social Psychology. 72 (3): 544–557. doi:10.1037/0022-3514.72.3.544. PMID 9120783. S2CID 12888135.
- Biernat, M.; Manis, M. (1994). "Shifting standards and stereotype-based judgments". Journal of Personality and Social Psychology. 66 (1): 5–20. doi:10.1037/0022-3514.66.1.5. PMID 8126651.
- Biernat, M.; Wortman, C. B. (1991). "Sharing of home responsibilities between professionally employed women and their husbands". Journal of Personality and Social Psychology. 60 (6): 844–860. doi:10.1037/0022-3514.60.6.844. PMID 1865323.
