= Sullivan Award =

Sullivan Award may refer to:

- Algernon Sydney Sullivan Award or Mary Mildred Sullivan Award; awarded at 29-grantee institutions of the Algernon Sydney Sullivan Foundation
- Annie Sullivan Award, given to Special Education Teachers, named after Helen Keller's teacher
- Carl R. Sullivan Award of the International Fisheries Section of the American Fisheries Society
- James E. Sullivan Award, awarded to outstanding amateur athletes in the United States
- Paula E. Sullivan Award, advertising industry award given annually by the Ad Club of San Diego
- Sullivan Award for Heroism by the San Francisco Fire Department
- Walter Sullivan Award for Excellence in Science Journalism
- William Matheus Sullivan Award, annual development award to gifted opera singers by the William Matheus Sullivan Musical Foundation
