= Algernon Sydney Sullivan =

American lawyer

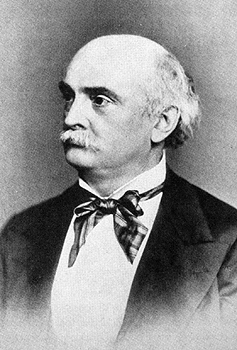
Algernon Sydney Sullivan

Algernon Sydney Sullivan (1826–1887) was an American lawyer noted for his role in the business law firm Sullivan & Cromwell.

== Biography ==
=== Early life ===
Algernon Sydney Sullivan was born in Madison, Indiana on April 5, 1826, son of Jeremiah Sullivan (1794–1870) and Charlotte Rudesel (Cutler) Sullivan. He was named in honor of the British politician, Algernon Sidney. His father was a lawyer, held the rank of Major in the War of 1812, and became a member of the Indiana legislature in 1821. Jeremiah Sullivan was also a judge of the criminal court of Jefferson County, Indiana, and of the Indiana Supreme Court (1837 - 1846). His grandfather, Thomas Littleton Sullivan, the son of an Irish barrister, emigrated from Charleville, County Cork, Ireland, in 1791, to Augusta County, Virginia. He also had a younger brother named Jeremiah C. Sullivan who, in addition to his legal career, also had a successful military career in both the U.S. Navy and the U.S. Army.

Algernon Sullivan was educated at Hanover College and Miami University, graduating in 1845. While a law student, about the age of twenty, he made a tour of Indiana, in advocacy of taxation for the maintenance of public schools. After studying law in his father's office, he was admitted to the bar in 1848, and for eight years practiced in Cincinnati, Ohio.

=== Career ===
In 1857, Sullivan moved to New York City, and soon took a prominent position as a lawyer. He was retained to defend the officers and crew of the Confederate schooner Savannah, the first vessel to be captured during the Civil War, who were on trial for their lives on the charge of piracy. From 1870 to 1873 Sullivan was assistant district attorney for New York City, and upon leaving that office he formed a partnership with Hermann Kobbe and Ludlow Fowler. In 1875, he was appointed public administrator, during which he instituted many reforms, reducing the charges upon estates administered, and, in spite of pressure, retaining in his service efficient assistants of a political party different from his own. In 1878 the firm of Sullivan, Kobbe & Fowler was dissolved and he formed a partnership with William Nelson Cromwell, under the name of Sullivan & Cromwell, which firm name is still retained by the successors to his business. Judge Bookstaver, of New York, in speaking of him, said: "He was always welcomed by the court in any case in which he appeared, because it was felt that his learning, ability, and absolute truthfulness would assist the court in the trial of any question of law and fact with which it had to deal."

He was a Whig in politics until 1856, when he became a Democrat, in which party he remained until his death.

Sullivan was concerned with the affairs of charitable organizations and of the First Presbyterian Church. He was a member of the American and New York State Bar associations, many social and scientific clubs, and was the first president of the Southern Society of New York. In 1851, he was married to Mary Slocum Groesbeck, of Cincinnati, Ohio, who died in the same year. He was married again, in 1855, to Mary Mildred Hammond Sullivan, an influential civic leader and philanthropist in New York City. She was the daughter of George W. Hammond of Winchester, Va. She survived him with one son, George Hammond Sullivan, a lawyer of New York City. Sullivan died December 4, 1887.

In 1926 The New York Southern Society established the Algernon Sydney Sullivan Award which is presented to undergraduate seniors at colleges and universities across the eastern United States. The participating institutions present the award as determined by a vote of the faculty.

After the New York Southern Society closed its doors, the awards were continued by the Algernon Sydney Sullivan Foundation and grew to include many institutions throughout the country, such as Campbellsville University, in Campbellsville, Kentucky, which awarded one of its first two honors to the physician Forest Shely, who was a CU trustee from 1954 until his death in 2010.
