= Robert Altman (photographer) =

American photographer (1944–2021)

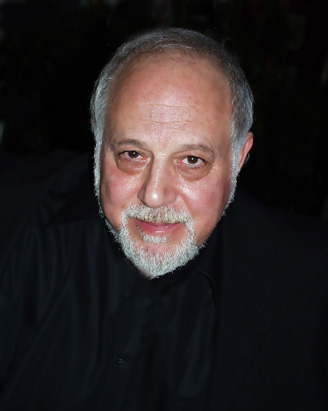
Altman in 2007

Robert Mark Altman (October 10, 1944 – September 24, 2021) was an American photographer. Altman attended Hunter College at the City University of New York and studied psychology and anthropology. Initially he had no intention of becoming a photographer, and said that the camera he wore around his neck was essentially just a prop to "meet girls". However, after graduation, he opened a shop called the Electric Lotus and displayed some of his photographs on a notice board here. The reaction here was so positive that Ansel Adams ended up taking him on as a photography apprentice.

He was soon hired as a photojournalist by Rolling Stone magazine. Here he was able to capture shots of the Rolling Stones while in the recording studio, and also captured shots of artists such as Joni Mitchell and Iggy Pop at music festivals. He found that being a photographer opened doors to places where others were not allowed, and he was able to closely follow the stars and capture images that immortalised the 1960s culture. Following his early success as chief staff photographer for Rolling Stone he expanded into fashion photography and fine art. He became a television producer/director for KEMO-TV, an independent station in the San Francisco Bay Area. For a decade beginning in the mid-1990s, Altman taught web design and photoshop as adjunct professor for several institutions including San Francisco State University and the University of California, Berkeley.

== Background ==
"Robert Altman's photography was instrumental in portraying the look and feeling and vitality of the Sixties." —Jann Wenner, Founder and Publisher of Rolling Stone Magazine

Altman has exhibited at Abbey Road Studios in London, The Beat Museum in San Francisco, Bethel Woods Center for the Arts, the Newseum in New York City, the Georgia Historical Society. Altman has been published in dozens of books, magazines and newspapers and his work is a part of the permanent collections of The San Francisco Public Library, The Library of Congress in Washington DC, The Smithsonian Institution, The Rock and Roll Hall of Fame, and the Kodak Rock Photography Collection.

During the summer of 2009, Altman collaborated with Macy's Herald Square in New York and filled most of the store's 49 windows with 175 images of his work as part of their "Art Under Glass" series.

In May 2010, he was presented with a Doctor of Arts, Honoris Causa, from Digital Media Arts College.

== Work ==
"The Sixties: Photographs" is a point of reference for Acid culture, Summer of Love, Rock, and Flower Power generation. This collection of photographs portrays iconic musicians, celebrities, rock stars and fans together. Altman's work captures the free flow atmosphere of this 1960's time period. His exploration in this collection book compliments Woodstock, and all the unique, emotion that it consisted of.

Such photographs are of documented live footage of audiences explorations of themselves and being free-spirited individuals. The themes of summer love are heavily implied through the "oneness" each individual feels. The connections between fans to their favourite performer illustrates the significance of Woodstock as a milestone in history.

Altman's work consists of presenting what is bare, raw, and natural to the viewer. The 1960s was a decade filled with protest, revolutionary ideologies, and freedom. His style of work presents experience. The livelihood of the Hippie Movement displayed simply through the photographic composition that Altman has learned from Ansel Adams.

The most prominent rule of composition that defines Robert Altman's art in photography is his perspective. The angles that are staged to capture moments are what signifies Altman's work and influence as successful.

== Personal views ==
When asked to compare today's society with the 1960s, Altman replied:

" Knowing that it's not really fair to compare the 60s with today I'll attempt to address this most natural of questions. The similarities? Well, youth is youth and youth will always be idealistic, restless and hopefully enthusiastic. In the United States during the 60s, and that includes the early 70s, there was one major difference confronting young men ... and that was the military draft was imposed on us. That meant that one could be yanked out of one's peaceful life and placed in harm's way 6000 miles from home. Unless you've lived that, unless you've felt that all pervasive fear in your core in your stomach, you can only imagine it's [sic] impact. That was the wedge and the major driving force which fueled the antiwar movement to a nuclear degree in the 60's."

Altman suffered from esophageal cancer and died on September 24, 2021. A cause of death is pending.

== Publications ==
The Sixties: Photographs by Robert Altman. Santa Monica Press (2007) ISBN 1-59580-024-7 ISBN 978-1-59580-024-4
