= Bernotas =

- Lithuanian surname
- m.: Bernotas
- f.: (unmarried): Bernotaitė
- f.: (married): Bernotienė

Bernotas is a Lithuanian language family name derived from the given name Bernardas. Cognates include Biernot (Biernat) and Bernot (Bernat) . It may refer to:

- Arturs Bernotas, Latvian chess player
- Eric Bernotas, American skeleton racer
- Juozas Bernotas, Lithuanian windsurfer
- Violeta Bernotaitė, Lithuanian olympic rower
- Albinas Bernotas, Lithuanian state prize winning poet and translator
