= Sydney Jordan (politician) =

American politician (born 1990)

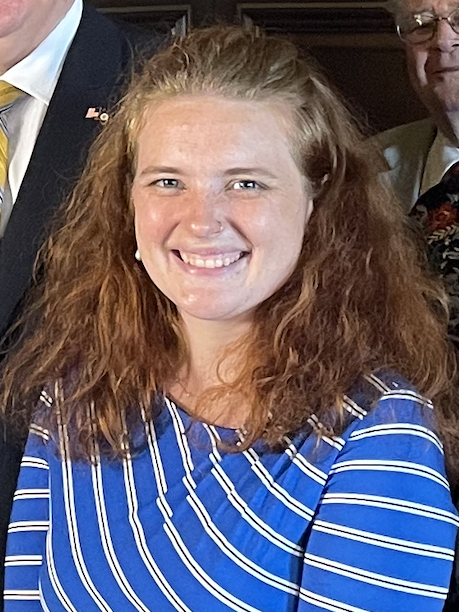

Member of the Minnesota House of Representatives from the 60A district
- Incumbent
- Assumed office February 11, 2020
- Preceded by: Diane Loeffler

Personal details
- Born: October 1, 1990 (age 35) Illinois, U.S.
- Party: Democratic (DFL)
- Education: University of Minnesota (B.A.)
- Occupation: Nonprofit employee; Legislator
- Website: Government website Campaign website

Sydney Jordan (born October 1, 1990) is an American politician serving in the Minnesota House of Representatives since 2020. A member of the Democratic–Farmer–Labor Party (DFL), Jordan represents District 60A, which includes parts of Minneapolis in Hennepin County.

== Early life, education, and career ==
Jordan was born in Illinois and attended the University of Minnesota, graduating with a B.A. in political science and global studies in 2013.

She has worked for the Minneapolis Federation of Teachers, was the political director for Jacob Frey's first mayoral campaign, and was the state director of Save the Boundary Waters. She advocated against Voter ID requirements during a proposed constitutional amendment campaign.

== Minnesota House of Representatives ==
Jordan was elected to the Minnesota House of Representatives in a special election on February 4, 2020. She won a full term in November 2020 and was reelected in 2022. Jordan first ran after the death of eight-term DFL incumbent Diane Loeffler, winning the primary election over 10 other candidates. She was endorsed by Minneapolis Mayor Jacob Frey.

Jordan serves as vice chair of the Environment and Natural Resources Finance and Policy Committee, and also sits on the Education Finance, Labor and Industry Finance and Policy, and Rules and Legislative Administration Committees. She is also an assistant majority leader for the House DFL caucus. From 2021 to 2022, Jordan served as the vice chair of the Legacy Finance Committee, which oversees the allocation of proceeds from a state sales tax increase passed by amendment in 2008.

=== Education ===
Jordan authored legislation to provide free breakfast and lunch to all students in Minnesota K-12 schools, which passed the House in February 2023. The bill passed the Senate, and was signed into law by Governor Tim Walz on March 17, 2023. Jordan also carried a bill that would require school districts have a comprehensive sexual health education program in elementary and secondary grades.

=== Public safety and police reform ===
Jordan supported voting "yes" on City Question 2, which would have renamed the Minneapolis Police Department the Minneapolis Department of Public Safety, removed minimum staffing levels for sworn officers, and shifted oversight of the new agency from the mayor's office to the city council. After the police killing of Winston Smith, where federal officers without body cameras killed a Minneapolis man, Jordan said that every officer in Minnesota should have a body camera. She signed on to a letter by U.S. Representative Ilhan Omar asking the Department of Justice to expand its investigation of the Minneapolis Police Department following the murder of George Floyd.

=== Environment and natural resources ===
Jordan signed on to a letter calling on the Biden administration to stop Line 3, a tar sands pipeline proposed to cut through Minnesota tribal lands. She joined environmental advocates pushing for the closing of a metal shredder in North Minneapolis after a stockpile caught on fire.

=== Other political positions ===
Jordan has described herself as "staunchly pro-union", "anti-racist" and "pro-abortion". After the Russian invasion of Ukraine in 2022, she led efforts to divest millions from state pension funds tied to Russia. A large number of Ukrainians live in northeast Minneapolis. During the COVID-19 pandemic, Jordan authored legislation requiring face masks for anyone six or older when indoors at a business or public setting, which did not become law.

== Electoral history ==
2020 DFL Primary for Minnesota State House - District 60A Special Election
Party	Candidate	Votes	%
Democratic (DFL)	Sydney Jordan	1,318	28.55
Democratic (DFL)	Jessica Intermill	976	21.14
Democratic (DFL)	Sonia Neculescu	792	17.15
Democratic (DFL)	Amal Ibrahim	342	7.41
Democratic (DFL)	Aaron Neumann	269	5.83
Democratic (DFL)	Zachary Wefel	179	3.88
Democratic (DFL)	Aswar Rahman	175	3.79
Democratic (DFL)	Susan Whitaker	171	3.70
Democratic (DFL)	Saciido Shaie	157	3.40
Democratic (DFL)	Piyali Nath Dalal	149	3.23
Democratic (DFL)	Mohamed Issa Barre	89	1.93
Total votes		4,617	100.0

2020 Minnesota State House - District 60A Special Election
Party	Candidate	Votes	%
Democratic (DFL)	Sydney Jordan	1,879	87.44
Legal Marijuana Now	Marty Super	247	11.49
Write-in		23	1.07
Total votes		2,149	100.0
Democratic (DFL) hold			

2020 Minnesota State House - District 60A
Party	Candidate	Votes	%
Democratic (DFL)	Sydney Jordan (incumbent)	20,541	82.39
Republican	John Holmberg	3,635	14.58
Veterans Party of Minnesota	Calvin Lee Carpenter	721	2.89
Write-in		33	0.13
Total votes		24,930	100.0
Democratic (DFL) hold			

2022 Minnesota State House - District 60A
Party	Candidate	Votes	%
Democratic (DFL)	Sydney Jordan (incumbent)	17,396	86.85
Republican	Diana Halsey	2,584	12.90
Write-in		50	0.25
Total votes		20,030	100.0
Democratic (DFL) hold			

2024 Minnesota State House - District 60A
Party	Candidate	Votes	%
Democratic (DFL)	Sydney Jordan (incumbent)	19,684	84.59
Republican	Mary Holmberg	3,535	15.19
Write-in		51	0.22
Total votes		23,270	100.0
Democratic (DFL) hold			

== Personal life ==
Jordan resides in the Northeast Park neighborhood in Northeast Minneapolis.
