= Self-limiting =

Self-limiting may refer to:

- Self-limiting (biology), describing an organism or colony of organisms which limits its own growth
- Governor (device), used to control the speed of mechanical equipment to prevent it from operating at unsafe speeds
- Electronic speed limiter, a system set by a manufacturer or by a driver to limit the maximum speed which can be reached by a road vehicle

== See also ==
- Self-regulation (disambiguation)
