= Nick Zerwas =

American politician (born 1980)

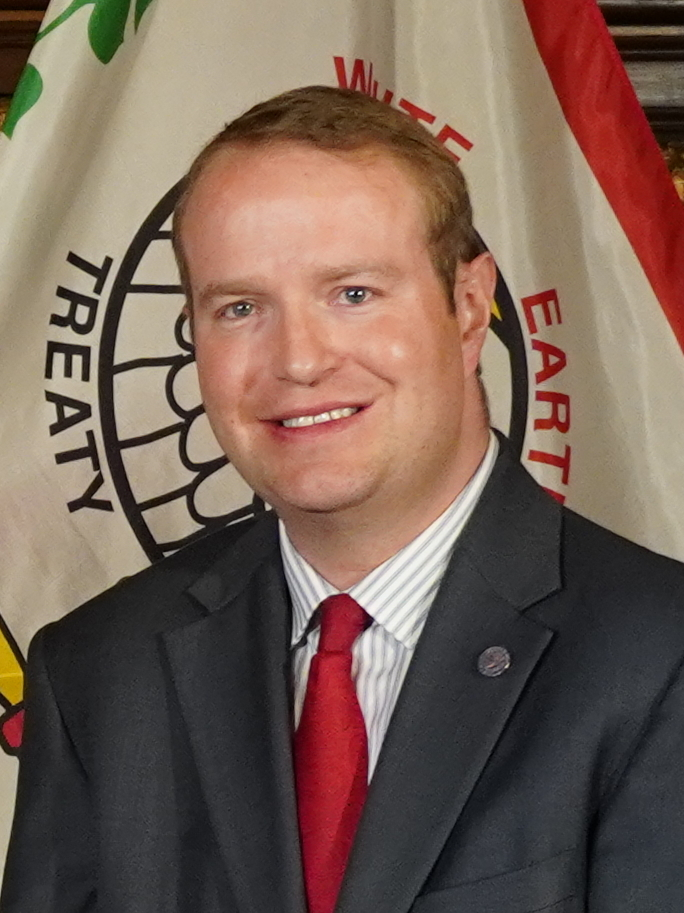

Member of the Minnesota House of Representatives from the 30A district
- In office January 8, 2013 – December 6, 2019
- Preceded by: Mary Kiffmeyer (District 16B)
- Succeeded by: Paul Novotny

Personal details
- Born: December 15, 1980 (age 45)
- Party: Republican
- Education: Hamline University (BA); University of Phoenix (MBA)
- Occupation: consultant

Nicholas Zerwas (born December 15, 1980) is a Minnesota politician and former member of the Minnesota House of Representatives. A member of the Republican Party of Minnesota, he represented District 30A in east-central Minnesota until his resignation on December 6, 2019.

== Education and early career ==
Zerwas attended Hamline University, graduating in 2003 with a B.A. in biology and forensic science. He later received an M.B.A. from the University of Phoenix.

He served in the Elk River City Council for six years.

== Minnesota House of Representatives ==
Zerwas was first elected to the Minnesota House of Representatives in 2012.

On November 25, 2019, Zerwas announced his resignation, effective on December 6, 2019. In a statement, he cited "My recent heart surgery brought into focus the need to spend as much time as I can with my wife and three-year-old son and spend my prime working years providing the best possible life for my family."

Governor Tim Walz called a special election for February 4, 2020, to fill the vacancy before the legislature reconvened.

== Personal life ==
Zerwas is married, and resides in Elk River with his wife and son.

Zerwas was born with a heart defect, and his right vocal chord was accidentally and permanently paralyzed during his third heart surgery at age 7.

In 2014, Zerwas pled guilty to driving under the influence after he was found driving 80 mph in a 60 mph zone with a blood alcohol concentration of 0.13.
