= 2020 Minnesota House of Representatives district 30A special election =

2020 District 30A special election
- February 4, 2020

Minnesota House of Representatives District 30A
Nominee	Paul Novotny	Chad Hobot
Party	Republican	Democratic (DFL)
Popular vote	1,983	1,141
Percentage	63.44%	36.50%
Representative before election
Nick Zerwas
Republican
Elected Representative
Paul Novotny
Republican

A special election was held in the U.S. state of Minnesota on February 4, 2020, to elect a new member for District 30A in the Minnesota House of Representatives, caused by the resignation of Republican member Nick Zerwas. A primary election was held on January 14, 2020, to nominate Republican candidate. Paul Novotny, the Republican nominee, won the special election.

== Background ==
On November 25, 2019, District 30A incumbent Nick Zerwas announced he would resign a week later on December 6. Zerwas, who was born with a congenital heart defect and had recently undergone heart surgery, said he would like to spend more time with his family and to better support them outside of the Legislature. On November 27, 2019, Governor Tim Walz announced the date of the special election, which will be held before and allow the winner to be seated by the February 11 reconvening of the 91st Minnesota Legislature.

District 30A represents southeastern Sherburne County and a small part of northeastern Wright County. Zerwas first represented the district after winning election in 2012, succeeding fellow Republican Mary Kiffmeyer, who retired to seek election to the Minnesota Senate. In the last election in 2018, Zerwas won with 64 percent of the vote.

== Candidates ==
The candidate filing period was from December 3 to December 10, 2019.

=== Republican Party of Minnesota ===
District 30A Republican delegates held a convention to endorse a candidate in Elk River on December 7, 2019. Paul Novotny won the endorsement over Kathy Ziebarth on the first ballot. Ziebarth said after the convention she would continue to seek the Republican nomination in the primary election.

- Paul Novotny, Sherburne County sheriff's office sergeant
- Kathy Ziebarth, registered nurse anesthetist; U.S. Air Force veteran

=== Minnesota Democratic–Farmer–Labor Party ===
- Chad Hobot, internet marketer

==== Withdrawn ====
- Michelle Rockhill

== Primary election ==
=== Results ===
Party	Candidate	Votes	%
Republican Party of Minnesota	Paul Novotny	1,136	86.98
Republican Party of Minnesota	Kathy Ziebarth	170	13.02
Subtotal		1,306	100.00
Minnesota Democratic–Farmer–Labor Party	Chad Hobot	152	100.00
Total		1,458	100.00
Invalid/blank votes		3	0.21
Turnout (out of 26,159 registered voters)		1,461	5.59
Source: Minnesota Secretary of State

== Results ==
Party	Candidate	Votes	%	+/−
Republican Party of Minnesota	Paul Novotny	1,983	63.44	−0.87
Minnesota Democratic–Farmer–Labor Party	Chad Hobot	1,141	36.50	+0.87
Write-ins		2	0.06	−0.01
Total		3,126	100.00	±0.00
Invalid/blank votes		0	0.00	−1.68
Turnout (out of 25,938 registered voters)		3,126	12.05	−56.08
Source: Minnesota Secretary of State

== See also ==
- 2020 Minnesota House of Representatives District 60A special election
- List of special elections to the Minnesota House of Representatives
