= Wil Lou Gray =

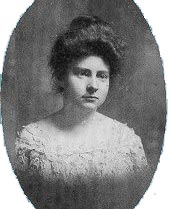
- Born: August 29, 1883; Laurens, South Carolina
- Died: March 10, 1984 (aged 100); Columbia, South Carolina
- Education: Laurens High School; Columbia College; Columbia University
- Occupation: Educator

Wil Lou Gray (August 29, 1883 – March 10, 1984) was an influential educator for both children and adults. Her primary focus was on adult literacy.

== Early life and education ==
Wil Lou Gray was born on August 29, 1883, in Laurens, South Carolina. She was the middle child and only daughter of William Lafayette Gray and Sarah Louise Dial. Her father, William Lafayette Gray, was a lawyer, merchant-farmer, and state representative from Laurens County. Her mother, Sarah Louise Dial, was the sister of U.S. Senator Nathaniel B. Dial. The Grays were members of South Carolina's affluent class, devout Methodists, conservative Democrats, and contributors to the industrial development of their town.

At age nine, Gray lost her mother to tuberculosis. She graduated from Laurens High School in 1899. Gray continued her education at Columbia College, graduating in 1903. She accepted a teaching position in a one-room, rural schoolhouse in Greenwood County. Teaching opened her eyes to poverty and inspired her to pursue graduate work at Vanderbilt University in 1905 and also Columbia University in 1910. While at Columbia University, Gray developed a progressive educational philosophy while studying under William Archibald Dunning and James Harvey Robinson. In 1911, she received her master's degree in political science.

== Career ==
Gray's career began in 1903 in Greenwood, South Carolina, where she taught at the Jones School. The Greenwood community did not see education as a priority, so Gray transferred to a teaching position in English at the Martha Washington College in 1907 and 1908. She then returned to her hometown, where she became the principal of the Youngs School. It was here she observed the issue of adult illiteracy and developed her passion for increasing education among adults. She was elected the supervisor of rural schools in Laurens County and in 1914, opened the first night school for adult education. Her efforts further included providing night schools, summer sessions, and even educational camps which she named "opportunity schools." While the first opportunity school was only open towards white woman, it later became open to men and African Americans.

On a trip to Switzerland in 1913, she witnessed a teacher on a field trip with more than one hundred boys, an experience that influenced her belief in the importance of field trips for both students and teachers. She would later travel with her students and colleagues to various cities, such as Columbia, Charleston, New York City, and Washington, D.C.

In 1921, Gray founded the Wil Lou Gray Opportunity School, which has since become an agency of the state of South Carolina.

== Awards ==
In 1937 she won the Algernon-Sidney Sullivan Award by the University of South Carolina for her service to mankind. She received a Service to the Black Race award from South Carolina State University. She received honorary doctorates from Wofford College, Columbia College, Clemson University, and Winthrop University. In 1950 the State American Legion granted her a plaque for distinguished public service. In 1974 she was inducted into the South Carolina Hall of Fame, and the Columbia Rotary Club honored her with the Paul Harris Fellowship Award. She was the only female nominee among thirty-four nominations for the South Carolina Man of the Half Century Award.
