= Chad Westberg =

American politician

Member-elect of the Minnesota House of Representatives from the 30B district
- Assuming office January 12, 2027
- Succeeding: Paul Novotny

Personal details
- Party: Republican
- Website: www.chadwestbergformn.com

Chad Westberg is an American politician of the Minnesota Republican Party who is the representative-elect for district 30B in the Minnesota House of Representatives. He was elected at the 2026 election. He is a member of the Elk River Planning Commission.
