= Paul Novotny =

American politician

Member of the Minnesota House of Representatives from the 30B district
- Incumbent
- Assumed office February 11, 2020
- Preceded by: Nick Zerwas
- Succeeded by: Chad Westberg (elect)

Personal details
- Born: May 26, 1966 (age 60)
- Party: Republican
- Spouse: Nicole
- Children: 2
- Education: North Hennepin Community College (A.A.S.)
- Occupation: Law enforcement
- Website: Government website Campaign website

Paul Novotny (/nəˈvɑt.ni/, born May 26, 1966) is an American politician serving in the Minnesota House of Representatives since 2020. A member of the Republican Party of Minnesota, Novotny represents District 30B in east-central Minnesota, which includes the cities of Elk River and Otsego and parts of Anoka, Sherburne, and Wright Counties.

== Early life, education, and career ==
Novotny grew up on a dairy farm in Elk River, Minnesota. He graduated from North Hennepin Community College with an A.A.S. in law enforcement.

Novotny has worked as a police officer in Princeton, Minnesota, and was a sergeant for the Sherburne County Sheriff's Office, serving as an investigative sergeant and a firearms instructor over the course of his 30-year career.

== Minnesota House of Representatives ==
Novotny was elected to the Minnesota House of Representatives in a special election on February 4, 2020. He won a full term in November 2020 and was reelected in 2022. Novotny first ran after four-term incumbent Nick Zerwas resigned to spend more time with his family.

During the 2021-22 legislative session, Novotny served as an assistant minority leader. He serves as the minority lead on the Public Safety Finance and Policy Committee and sits on the Human Services Policy and Ways and Means Committees.

=== Political Positions ===
Novotny opposes ending qualified immunity for police officers and banning no-knock warrants. He drafted legislation that would require more transparency when third-party organizations post bail for someone. He has argued that bail should be set for violent offenders who pose a threat to society, not nonviolent low-level offenses. Novotny opposed a provision that would give families of those killed by police money for burial costs and trauma services.

Novotny supported a DFL bill requiring judges to issue "sign and release" warrants for certain misdemeanor offenses instead of arrest warrants. He co-authored a bill establishing harsher penalties for the sale or possession of fentanyl, and legislation that would create an electronic database to track the sale of used catalytic converters in response to an increase in theft. Novotny spoke against a state office of youth restorative justice because it would increase bureaucracy.

Novorny opposed legislation to restore the right to vote to felons while they are on parole, saying it is unfair to the victims of serious crimes such as homicides. He unsuccessfully attempted to amend the bill to require payment of fines before voting rights are restored.

Novotny signed on to a letter to the Sherburne County Board of Commissioners asking it to designate the county a "Second Amendment sanctuary." He has expressed concerns about red flag laws.

== Electoral history ==
2020 Republican Primary for Minnesota State House - District 30A Special Election
Party	Candidate	Votes	%
Republican	Paul Novotny	1,136	86.98
Republican	Kathy Ziebarth	170	13.02
Total votes		1,306	100.0

2020 Minnesota State House - District 30A Special Election
Party	Candidate	Votes	%
Republican	Paul Novotny	1,983	63.44
Democratic (DFL)	Chad Hobot	1,141	36.50
Write-in		2	0.06
Total votes		3,126	100.0
Republican hold			

2020 Minnesota State House - District 30A
Party	Candidate	Votes	%
Republican	Paul Novotny (incumbent)	16,154	66.23
Democratic (DFL)	Chad Hobot	8,219	33.70
Write-in		16	0.07
Total votes		24,389	100.0
Republican hold			

2022 Minnesota State House - District 30B
Party	Candidate	Votes	%
Republican	Paul Novotny (incumbent)	12,866	65.57
Democratic (DFL)	Chad Hobot	6,751	34.40
Write-in		6	0.03
Total votes		19,623	100.0
Republican hold			

== Personal life ==
Novotny lives in Elk River, Minnesota, with his wife, Nicole. They have two children.
