= Kitty Joyner =

American electrical engineer (1916–1993)

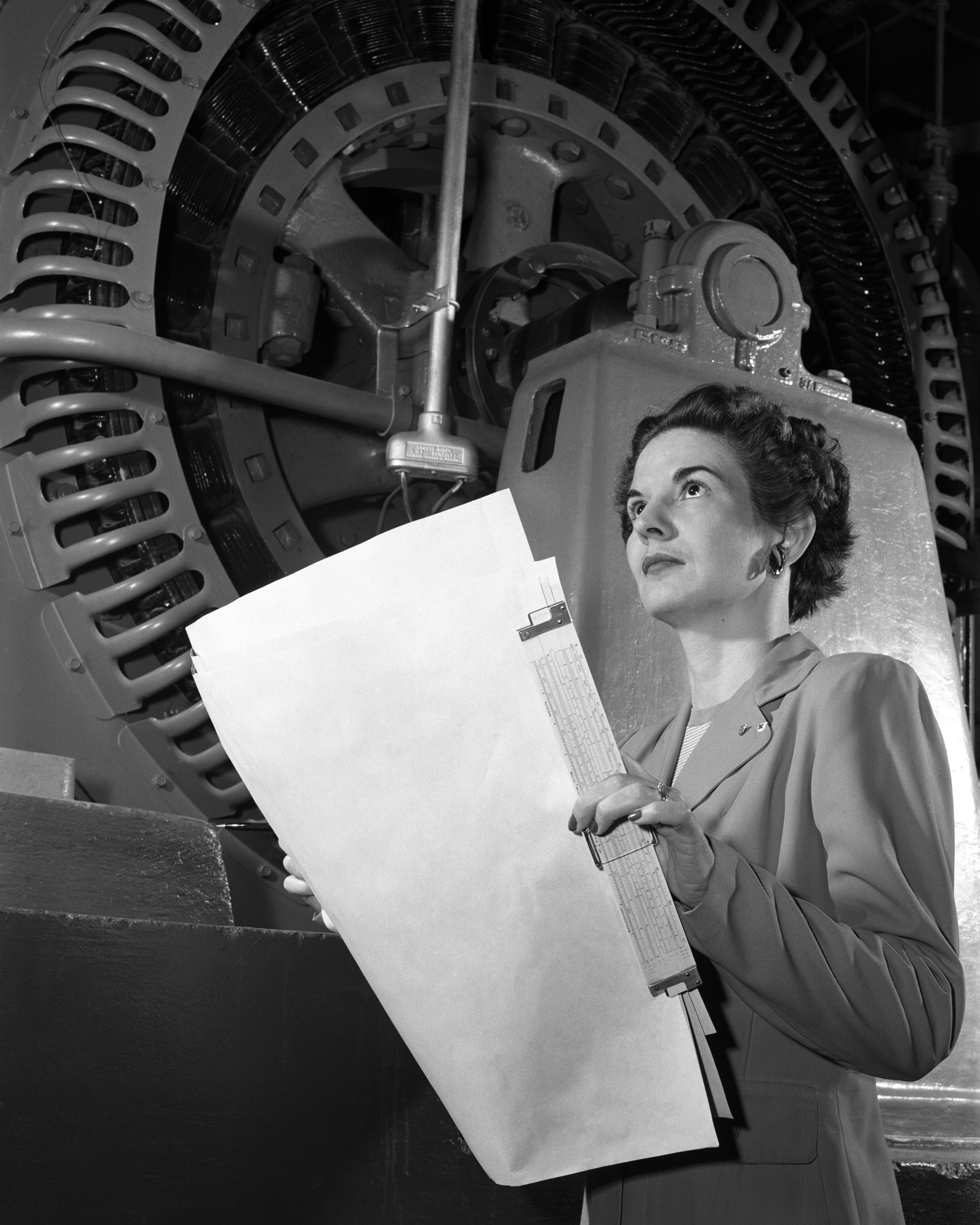
- Joyner analyzing the operation of a wind tunnel turbine at NACA Langley in 1952
- Born: Kitty Wingfield O'Brien; July 11, 1916; Charlottesville, Virginia, U.S.
- Died: August 16, 1993 (aged 77); Charlottesville, Virginia, U.S.
- Education: Sweet Briar College; University of Virginia
- Occupation: Electrical engineer
- Years active: 1939–1971
- Employers: NACA; NASA
- Organization: IEEE
- Known for: First woman engineer at the Memorial Langley Aeronautical Laboratory
- Spouse: Upshur T. Joyner
- Children: 2
- Awards: Algernon Sydney Sullivan Award

Kitty Wingfield Joyner (née O'Brien; July 11, 1916 – August 16, 1993) was an American electrical engineer with the National Advisory Committee for Aeronautics (NACA), and then with the National Aeronautics and Space Administration (NASA) upon its replacement of NACA in 1958. She was the first woman to graduate from the University of Virginia's engineering program in 1939, receiving the Algernon Sydney Sullivan Award upon graduation. When she was hired by NACA the same year, she became the first woman engineer at the organization, eventually rising to the title of Branch Head and managing several of its wind tunnels. Her work contributed to research on aeronautics, supersonic flight, airfoils, and aircraft design standards.

== Early life and education ==
Kitty Wingfield O'Brien was born in Charlottesville, Virginia, on July 11, 1916. Her father was an engineer, inspiring her to pursue the same career. After high school, she wanted to attend the University of Virginia (UVA). Virginia state law had allowed women to attend public universities since 1920, but UVA implemented several hurdles for women who wished to apply, requiring that they attend school somewhere else for two years first and be at least 20 years old. These requirements were still in place in 1935, when O'Brien would have applied, so she attended Sweet Briar College for two years between 1935 and 1937, then successfully petitioned UVA to gain admission.

Not initially seeing an opportunity for women in the field, she told a Miami News reporter that "she had always wished she were a boy so she could follow his profession". The reporter wrote about her while she was in Florida attending an engineering conference at which her paper "Fluorescence, the Light of the Future" won second place among student work. Although the reporter remarked that "electrical engineering is scarcely considered a feminine profession", O'Brien used the opportunity to talk about how engineering presents a great opportunity for women and girls.

In her time at UVA she was secretary of the Virginia branch of the American Institute of Electrical Engineering and member of the university's Trigon engineering society. She was also president of her sorority, Chi Omega, and president of the Woman's Student association. In 1939, she became the first woman to graduate from UVA with a Bachelor of Science degree in electrical engineering. She was selected to receive the Algernon Sydney Sullivan Award, which the university gives to two graduating students each year "for excellence of character and service to humanity".

== Career ==
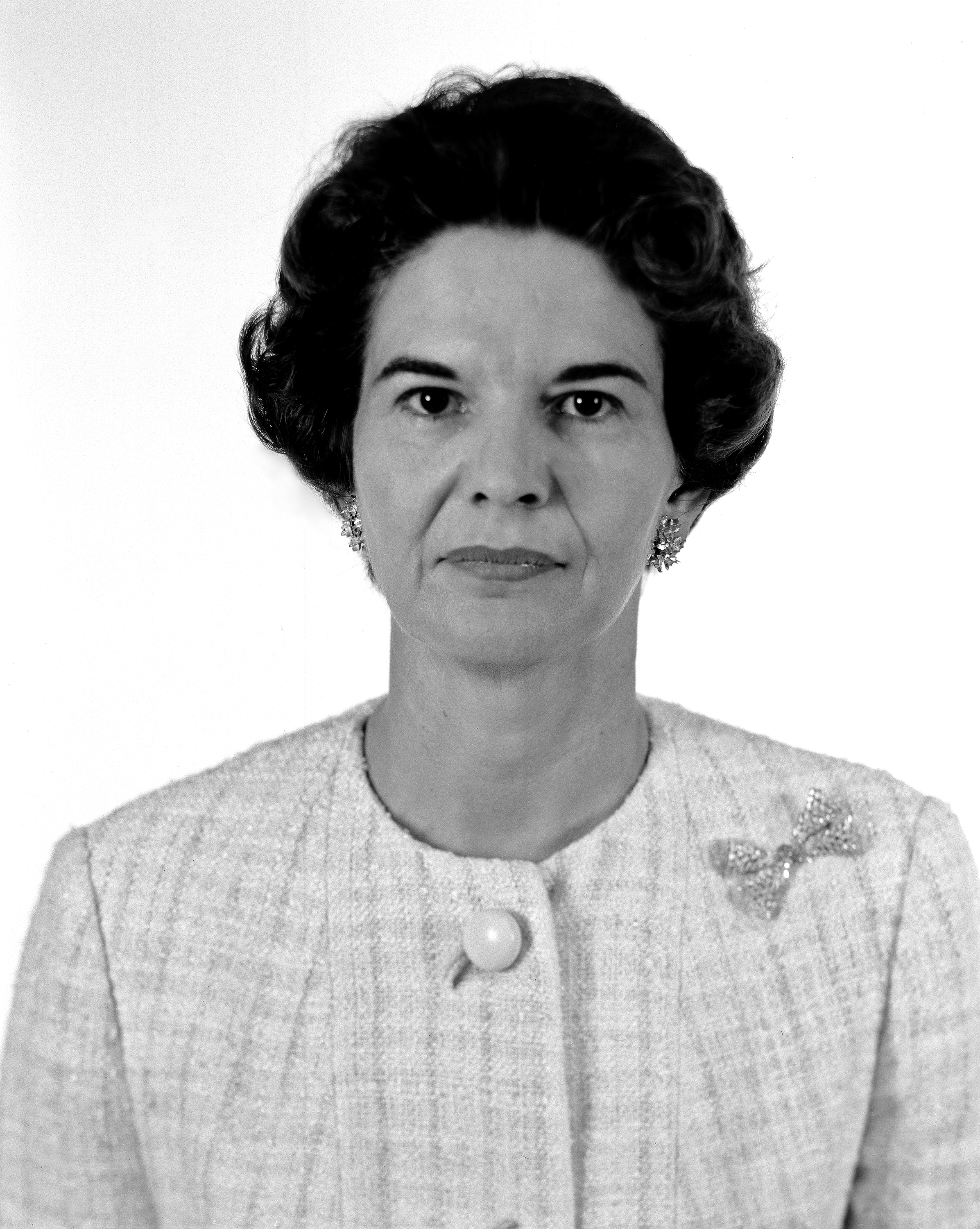
Joyner in 1964

The NACA Langley Memorial Aeronautical Laboratory (later the Langley Research Center) hired Joyner as a junior civil engineering aide in September 1939, making her their first woman engineer. At the time, the organization was expanding its aeronautics research and development in the time before World War II. Her career developed quickly, as she shifted her focus from civil to electrical engineering. Among her responsibilities was the management of the electrical systems for several wind tunnels, including supersonic wind tunnels, large, expensive facilities important to testing aircraft. She continued working at Langley for more than three decades, continuing at the National Aeronautics and Space Administration (NASA) when it replaced NACA in 1958. By the 1960s, she achieved the title Branch Head of the Facilities Cost Estimating Branch, Office of Engineering and Technical Services.

Over the course of her career at NACA/NASA, Joyner made contributions to research on aeronautics, supersonic flight, and the design of airfoils. Her work had implications for military and commercial flight applications, and she was influential in the production of aircraft design standards that continued to be relevant many years later. She retired from NASA in May 1971.

Joyner was active in engineering organizations and societies. She was a member of the Institute of Electrical and Electronics Engineers (IEEE) and Honorary Life Member of the Engineers Club of the Virginia Peninsula.

== Personal life ==
O'Brien married Upshur T. Joyner, a physicist who also worked at NACA/NASA, best known for his contributions at the NASA Langley Landing Loads Dynamics Facility. Together they had two children: a son named Upshur O'Brien Joyner, who died of leukemia at the age of 47 in 1990, and a daughter, Kate Bailey. In 1971, both Kitty and Upshur retired. They lived in Poquoson, Virginia.

In addition to her professional and personal engineering activities, she was a member of the P.E.O. Sisterhood, Daughters of the American Colonists, and United Daughters of the Confederacy, which in 1992 presented her with the Winnie Davis Award, recognizing exceptional dedication or contributions to the organization. She also served as first regent and organizer for the Charles Parish Chapter of the Daughters of the American Revolution, which named an annual scholarship after her.

Joyner died on August 16, 1993, at the age of 77. Her husband died a few months later, in November 1993, at the age of 85.
