= Algernon Sydney Sullivan Award =

The Algernon Sydney Sullivan Award is an award presented to graduating seniors, alumni, and faculty of selected colleges and universities in the Southern United States for excellence of character and service to humanity.

The awards stem from the Society's wish to establish a permanent reminder of the "noblest human qualities as expressed and followed in the life of its first president, Algernon Sydney Sullivan; and to do so in a manner which will perpetuate the influence of such a man, not so much as an individual but as a type." Specifically, each awarding institution seeks recipients with Sullivan's ideals of heart, mind, and conduct as evidenced by a spirit of love for and helpfulness to others, who "excel in high ideals of living, in fine spiritual qualities, and in generous and unselfish service to others. When the institution makes the Student Award, it appoints the recipient as its representative to bear its standard before the world."

The Award consists of a copper medallion, an engraved certificate, and the biography of Algernon Sydney Sullivan. Recipients were chosen yearly from the graduation class of each institution, which also had the privilege of honoring one non-student conspicuously helpful to and associated with the institution in its effort to encourage and preserve a high standard of character.

The award was first given by the New York Southern Society in honor of prominent New York lawyer, Algernon Sydney Sullivan, at Peabody College in Nashville, now part of Vanderbilt University. That success led to the establishment of the Award in other institutions, and for the disposition of the fund provided for that purpose.

By 1934, the Algernon Sydney Sullivan Award was being presented to deserving individuals at thirteen colleges throughout the South. In 1936, the Algernon Sydney Sullivan Foundation began distributing scholarships at four of those institutions.

== Notable recipients ==
- Cynthia Bathurst, animal rights activist
- Katie Britt, United States Senator
- Hester A. Davis, Arkansas State Archaeologist
- Riley Gaines, University of Kentucky NCAA Swim Team Medalist
- Robert Gates, U.S. Secretary of Defense
- Betty Jane Gorin-Smith, Kentucky historian
- Wil Lou Gray, South Carolina innovator in alternative education
- Doug Hicks, 19th President, Davidson College
- William C. Hubbard, Dean of the University of South Carolina School of Law and Former American Bar Association President
- Lewis Craig Humphrey, Kentucky newspaper editor
- Sarah A. Imam M.D., Assistant Professor, Department of Health and Human Performance, The Citadel, South Carolina
- Matthew Gordon Lanetti, Citadel Regimental Academic Officer
- Yossi Jefferey Alan Liebowitz, Rabbi, Professor at University of South Carolina, Upstate and Wofford College, Humanitarian, Activist, and Musician in folk music group, "The Cap and The Collar"
- John McCardell Jr., historian and academic administrator
- Paul Goodloe McIntire, Investment banker
- Kitty O'Brien Joyner, first female engineer at NASA
- Lewis F. Powell Jr., Associate Justice of the Supreme Court of the United States
- Jaret Sean Price, Company Commander within The Citadel’s South Carolina Corps of Cadets
- Rick H. Hoyle, Professor of Psychology and Neuroscience at Duke University
- MacHenry Schafer, Presbyterian minister and transgender rights activist
