= Len Biernat =

American politician

Member of the Minnesota House of Representatives from the 59A district
- In office January 7, 1997 – January 3, 2005
- Preceded by: John Sarna
- Succeeded by: Diane Loeffler

Personal details
- Born: November 24, 1946 (age 79) Hennepin County, Minnesota
- Party: Democratic Farmer Labor Party
- Spouse: Christine Jax (divorced 2006)
- Children: 4
- Education: Mankato State College (BS); Hamline University (JD); College of St. Thomas (MA); New York University (LLM)
- Occupation: Professor, 1st Lieutenant, legislator, veteran

Lenard Francis Biernat (born November 24, 1946) is a Minnesota politician and former member of the Minnesota House of Representatives. A member of the Democratic Farmer Labor Party, he represented District 59A, which includes a portion of Hennepin in the northwestern Twin Cities metropolitan area.

== Background ==
Biernat served in the United States Army. He served on the Minneapolis School Board. Biernat served four terms in the House of Representatives: 80th, 81st, 82nd, and 83rd.

=== 83rd Legislative Session (2003 - 2004) ===
==== Committees ====
- Civil Law
- Education Finance
- Education Policy

=== 82nd Legislative Session (2001 - 2002) ===
==== Committees ====
- Education Policy
- Governmental Operations and Veterans Affairs Policy
- K-12 Education Finance

=== 81st Legislative Session (1999 - 2000) ===
==== Committees ====
- Education Policy
- K-12 Education Finance
- Transportation Policy

=== 80th Legislative Session (1997 - 1998) ===
==== Committees ====
- Education
- Education Subcommittee:Facilities
- Education Subcommittee: K-12 Education Finance Division
- Judiciary
- Judiciary Subcommittee: Civil and Family Law Division
- Judiciary Subcommittee: Data Practices

He is Emeritus Professor of Law at Mitchell Hamline School of Law

== Personal life ==
Biernat's father Thaddeus Lewis Biernat served in the Minnesota Legislature a decade prior to Biernat's first term. He has one daughter with his first wife, and three step daughters with his second wife, Christine Jax, divorced in 2006. He is retired and lives in Bonita Springs Florida.
