= Digital Media Arts College =

Former art school in Boca Raton, Florida

Coordinates: 26.384623°N 80.076159°W

- Type: Private for-profit art and design college
- Active: 2002–2017
- President: Sunny Sharma
- Dean: Dr. Christine Jax
- Academic staff: 35
- Students: 317
- Undergraduates: 293
- Location: Boca Raton, Florida, United States of America
- Website: dmac.edu

Digital Media Arts College (DMAC) was a private for-profit art and design college in Boca Raton, Florida. DMAC was founded in 2002 to offer bachelor's degrees in 3D animation and graphic design. It was acquired by Lynn University in 2017 and made part of the Eugene M. and Christine E. Lynn College of Communication and Design.

DMAC was accredited by the Accrediting Council for Independent Colleges and Schools (ACICS). It enrolled approximately 350 students.

== Academics ==
DMAC offered specialized Bachelor of Fine Arts degrees in Computer Animation (and a concentration in Game Art) and Graphic Design (and a concentration in Advertising Design) as well as Master of Fine Arts degrees in Visual Effects Animation and Web Design. In 2014, DMAC launched online programs which included an Associate of Multimedia Design and a Master in Web Design and Technology Professional certificate programs were also offered for students working towards a degree and as resume enhancers for professionals working in an advertising-related industry.

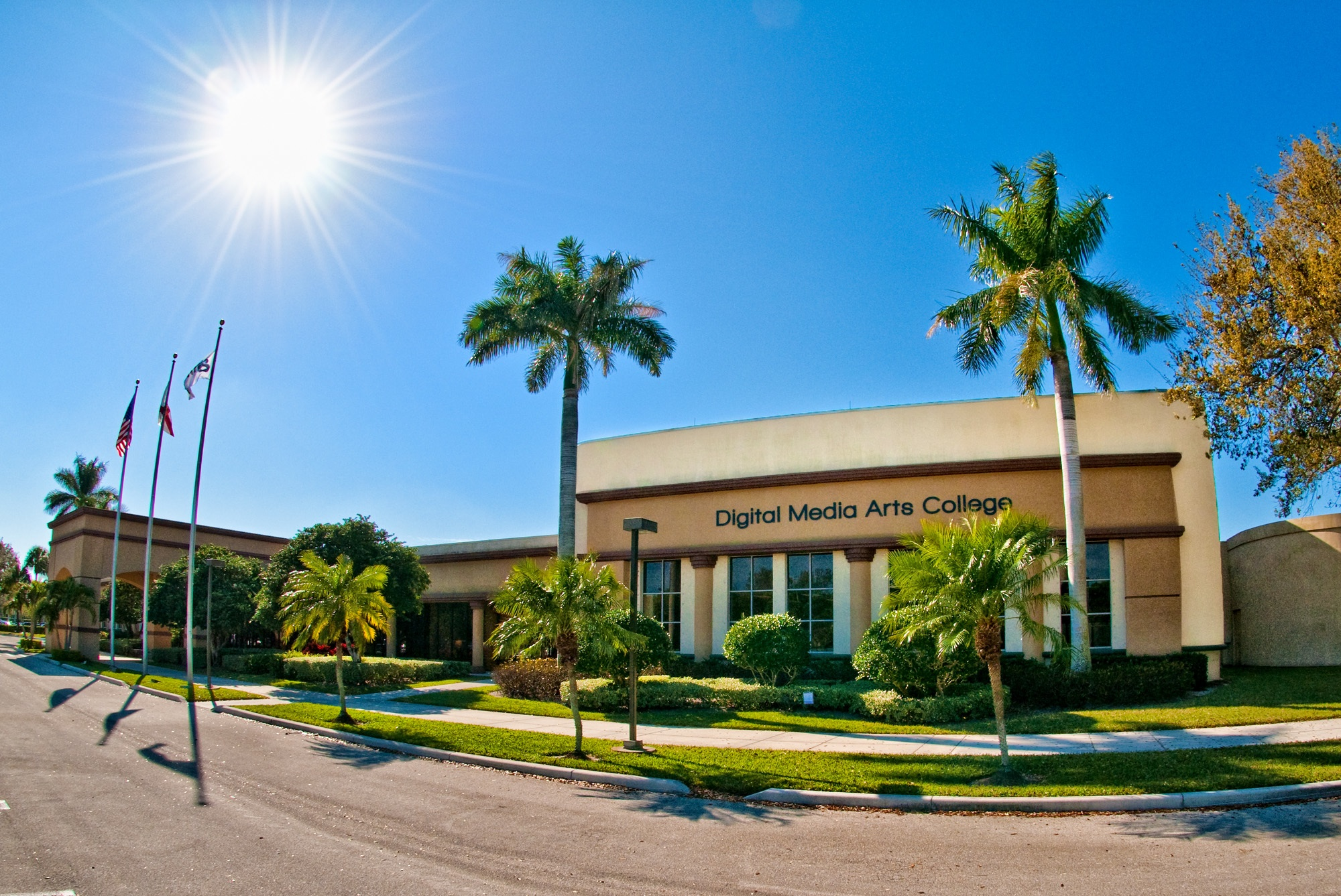
Digital Media Arts College Located in Boca Raton, Florida

== Campus ==
The DMAC campus was a 33,000+ square foot facility located in Boca Raton, Florida. The campus was retained and is still used by Lynn University.
