= Christine Jax =

- Born: Detroit, MI
- Education: Ph.D., MA, BA
- Alma mater: University of Minnesota; Hamline University
- Spouse: Zeus Castillo
- Website: www.christinejax.com

Christine Jax was a commissioner of the Minnesota Department of Education (then known as the Department of Children, Families and Learning) from 1999 to 2003. In 2012 she ran for a school board position in Palm Beach County, Florida, and in 2015 she became the dean and chief academic officer for Digital Media Arts College, an art and design college in Boca Raton, Florida.

== Career and writing ==
Jax founded and managed a school for homeless children in Minneapolis, Minnesota in the early 1990s. In 1996, Jax received a Bush Foundation grant to conduct a study concerning educational policy pertaining to urban high school students. For the past 25 years Jax has taught and held administrative positions at various higher education institutions, including Ashworth College, Capella University, and Walden University, as well as Saint Mary’s University of Minnesota. In 2015 she accepted the position of chief academic officer at Digital Media Arts College. In 2021 Jax became the CEO of International Accreditation Association.

From 1999 to 2003 she served the state of Minnesota as Commissioner of Education (Education Chief) as a member of Governor Jesse Ventura's appointed cabinet. During her tenure, the budget of the department she led (the Minnesota Department of Children, Families, and Learning, which was the state's state education agency) was cut by $8.5 million (more than 10 percent). As a result, according to Education Week, Jax "cut one-quarter of the department's staff, to 183 positions, and restricted agency spending on travel, hiring, and contracting."

Jax has authored three non-fiction books: The Seven Stages of an Enlightened Teacher; Who's Building the Ark: How to Manage Through Hell and High Water; and Women Within.

== Electoral politics ==
In 2002, Jax was briefly a candidate for governor of Minnesota, running as an Independence Party of Minnesota candidate. Jax dropped out of the race and endorsed congressman Tim Penny, who was defeated by Republican Tim Pawlenty in a three-way race.

Jax subsequently moved from Minnesota to South Florida. Jax ran for the Palm Beach County School Board in 2012. In a five-candidate race, Jax advanced to a runoff election, but was defeated by Michael Murgio.

== Personal ==
Jax is married to Jesus "Zeus" Castillo, a Miami-Dade Firefighter/paramedic. The couple has seven children and seven grandchildren.
