= Diane Loeffler =

American politician (1953–2019)

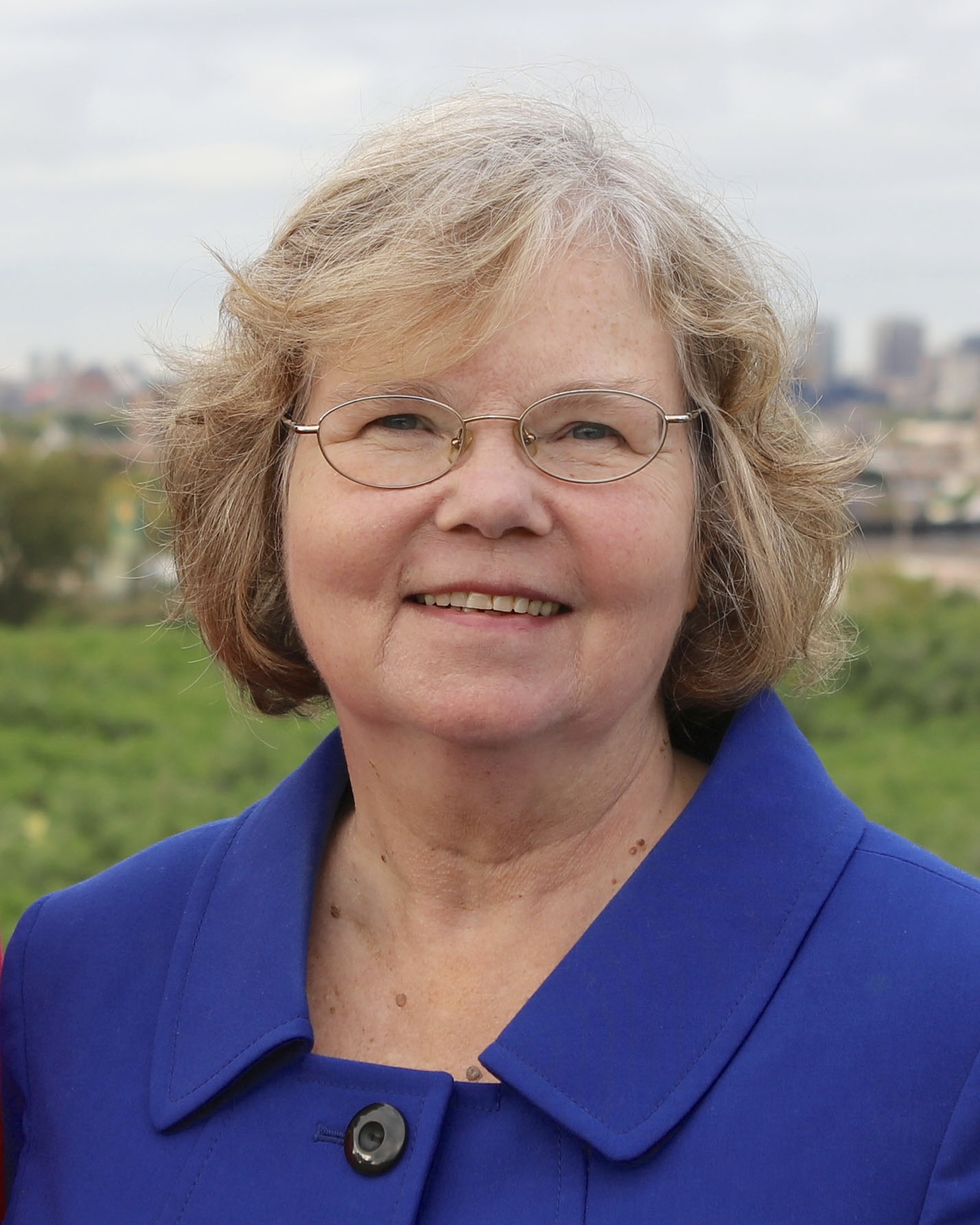

Member of the Minnesota House of Representatives from the 60A district 59A (2005–2013)
- In office January 4, 2005 – November 16, 2019
- Preceded by: Len Biernat
- Succeeded by: Sydney Jordan

Personal details
- Born: July 12, 1953 Minneapolis, Minnesota, U.S.
- Died: November 16, 2019 (aged 66) Minneapolis, Minnesota, U.S.
- Party: Minnesota Democratic–Farmer–Labor Party
- Spouse: Michael Vennewitz
- Education: Augsburg College; University of Minnesota
- Occupation: Policy analyst, legislator

Diane Loeffler (July 12, 1953 – November 16, 2019) was an American politician and member of the Minnesota House of Representatives. A member of the Minnesota Democratic–Farmer–Labor Party (DFL), she represented District 60A, which includes the thirteen neighborhoods of Northeast Minneapolis, which is part of the Twin Cities metropolitan area. She was also a health policy analyst and planner for Hennepin County.

== Education and professional career ==
Loeffler graduated from Edison High School in Minneapolis, then went on to Augsburg College, also in Minneapolis, earning her Bachelor of Arts magna cum laude in Social Science. She also attended graduate school at the University of Minnesota for Educational Administration and Public Administration. Prior to her position with Hennepin County, she worked as a senior financial analyst for the city of Minneapolis, with Hennepin County Human Services' Health and Training and Employment, as a tax policy analyst and legislative representative for the League of Minnesota Cities, as Director of Senior Services for School District 281, and as an education budget and policy analyst for the state of Minnesota.

== Minnesota House of Representatives ==
Loeffler was first elected in 2004 and was re-elected every two years until her death in 2019.

== Community service ==
Active in her local community and at the state level through the years, Loeffler was the executive director of the Association for Retarded Citizens of Saint Paul, a founding board member of the Minnesota Council of Nonprofits, a founder of Northeast Libraries Supporters, and a member of the Windom Park Citizens in Action. She was also a member of the Central Avenue Planning Committee, of the Minneapolis Citizens Committee on Public Education, and of the Northeast Retail Shopping Task Force. She served on the Minnesota 2005 Capitol Centennial Commission, and on the Minnesota Statehood Sesquicentennial Commission from 2006 to 2008.

== Death ==
Loeffler died on November 16, 2019, from cancer. She was 66 years old.
