= Thaddeus Lewis Biernat =

American businessman and politician

Thaddeus Lewis Biernat (October 27, 1918 – August 1, 1996) was an American businessman and politician.

Biernat was born in Minneapolis, Minnesota. He graduated from Edison High School in Minneapolis in 1936. Biernat served in the United States Army during World War II. He went to University of Minnesota. Biernat owned Biernat's Liquor and Groceries store. Biernat served in the Minnesota House of Representatives from 1949 to 1956 and was a Democrat. He died at his home in Minneapolis. His son Len Biernat also served in the Minnesota Legislature.
