= Gertruda Biernat =

Polish paleontologist

- Born: Gertruda Skonieczna; March 17, 1923; Opole Lubelskie
- Died: March 1, 2016 (aged 92); Kałuszyn
- Education: University of Poznań
- Known for: Studying brachiopods
- Spouse: Sebastian Biernat
- Scientific career
- Fields: Geology, paleontology
- Workplaces: University of Poznań; Museum of the Earth, Polish Academy of Sciences; Institute of Paleobiology, Polish Academy of Sciences
- Thesis: Middle devonian orthoidea of the Holy Cross Mountains and their ontogeny (1959)

Gertruda Józefa Biernat (March 17, 1923 – March 1, 2016) was a Polish geologist and paleontologist. During World War II, she joined the Polish resistance, participating in the Warsaw Uprising. She is noted for her work in identifying and studying brachiopods of the Ordovician period of the Paleozoic Era, and several have been named in her honor. Biernat worked at institutions of the Polish Academy of Sciences, published major works on brachiopods, participating in paleontological expeditions internationally, including leading a series of expeditions in the Arctic.

== Early life and education ==
Biernat was born Gertruda Skonieczna in Opole Lubelskie, in eastern Poland on March 17, 1923. She grew up in Starogard Gdański, northern Poland.

After the war, she studied geology at the University of Poznań, gaining a masters of science in 1950.

== Scientific career ==
Biernat worked at the University of Poznań after graduating, and then at the Museum of the Earth of the Polish Academy of Sciences. In 1953, she was invited to join the new Institute of Paleobiology, a research institution established as a branch of the Academy in recognition of the work of its first director, Roman Kozłowski. She remained there until her retirement in 1998.

Brachiopods were a dominant form of marine life in the Paleozic era, though most forms are now extinct. When Kozłowski moved on from studying them, he wanted that work to continue in Poland. Biernat extended that work into further periods of the Paleozic, including the Ordovician period. She published her first paper on brachiopods in 1953. She would go on to author or co-author monographs and 16 papers. She also contributed book chapters, including co-authoring a chapter on mass extinction of brachiopods in Poland at the end of the Ordivician.

Despite political limitations of scientists' contact with the West for much of her career, Biernat participated in several international activities, including authoring a chapter in the 1965 Treatise on Invertebrate PaleontologyTreatise on Invertebrate Paleontology. She maintained friendships with Helen Muir-Wood and Sir Alwyn Williams.

Biernat was awarded her PhD in 1959, with a thesis on the ontogeny and taxonomy of an extinct order of brachiopods, Orthida, titled Middle devonian orthoidea of the Holy Cross Mountains and their ontogeny. In 1959 Biernat was a member of a U.S. National Museum expedition in New York. In the 1970s, she initiated and led a series of paleontological expeditions to Spitsbergen in the Arctic. Publications arising from these include a monograph published in English and Polish.

In honor of her work identifying many brachiopods, three brachiopod genera have been named for her: Biernatium Havlíček, 1975 (Devonian orthide), Biernatella Baliński, 1977 (Devonian athyridide), and Biernatia Holmer, 1989 (Ordovician acrotretide).

== Personal life and World War II ==
Skonieczna had to flee to Warsaw after the outbreak of World War II in 1939. She joined the Polish resistance, and served as a nurse in the major 1944 operation to try to liberate Warsaw from Nazi occupation called the Warsaw Uprising.

After the war, Skonieczna married fellow geologist, Sebastian Biernat. They had two sons, and she was a great-grandmother when she died at age 92.
