= Shifting standards model =

Social psychology framework

The shifting standards model is a framework in social psychology which proposes that stereotypes are influenced by relative comparisons. It suggests that evaluation and judgment are subjective and may be imposed by onlookers depending on the group being evaluated, and that prior experiences with a given group affect future assessments of group members by creating expected norms for behavior.

== Applications ==
=== Previous restrictions ===
Originally, this model was thought to only harm stereotypical low-status groups. However, recent research by McCabe & Brannon, suggests that the shifting standards model can be used in evaluating people from a higher status group. In a study conducted with undergraduate college students, McCabe and Brannon instructed each participant to read a paragraph with either a stereotypical black or white name, then rate the level of ambition for each individual. The unemployed subtype of the stereotypical high-power White group was rated less ambitious than the unemployed subtype of the stereotypical low-power Black group.

=== Competition for limited and unlimited resources ===
The shifting standards model can also have an effect on making evaluations, depending on the kind of judgment being made. That is, if there are more negative stereotype views toward one group than others, then standards used to evaluate an individual from one of those groups shifts either up or down. Some groups are generally considered to be of high competency, such as white men; and some groups are considered to be of lower competency, such as women or African-Americans. In a competition of limited resources, the high competency group will be awarded the resources, even if they are actually less deserving. However, in cases of unlimited resources, such as performance appraisal, lower competency groups will be given more of the resource, even if they performed relatively more poorly. This is due to lower expectations of negatively stereotyped groups.

=== Sex and gender differences ===
This model can also be applied to sex and gender differences. Fuegen and colleagues presented a study from two different universities where the subjects were instructed to review job applicants and judge their competence level for the job. Each applicant was either male or female, single or married and had no children or two children. Strikingly, both male and female parents were judged as less competent for the job than childless applicants. Also, gender standards were shifted in the evaluation of applicants. Male parents were judged with more leniency than childless men and women with children. This displays the notion that good performance for a male is not equivalent to what constitutes good performance for a female.

=== Measuring stereotype accuracy ===
In measuring stereotype accuracy, researchers often assume that assessments are stable across time and situation. However, research based on the shifting standards model shows just the opposite, that stereotypes are unstable and depend largely on how the participant chooses a reference point for making their assessment.

== See also ==
- Discrimination
- Sexism
- Stereotype
- Stereotype fit hypothesis
