= Self-regulation =

Self-regulation may refer to:

- Emotional self-regulation
- Self-control, in sociology/psychology
- Self-regulated learning, in educational psychology
- Self-regulation theory (SRT), a system of conscious personal management
- Industry self-regulation, the process of monitoring one's own adherence to industry standards
- Self-regulatory organization, in business and finance
- Homeostasis, a state of steady internal conditions maintained by living things
- Emergence, the phenomenon in which unpredictable outcomes emerge from complex systems
- Self-regulating variable resistance cables used for trace heating
- Spontaneous order

== See also ==
- Self-limiting (disambiguation)
