= Role congruity theory =

Theory about social roles and acceptance

Role congruity theory proposes that a group will be positively evaluated when its characteristics are recognized as aligning with that group's typical social roles (Eagly & Diekman, 2005). Conversely, the stereotype fit hypothesis suggests that group members will experience discrimination in different social roles or positions to the extent that their group stereotypically does not have characteristics associated with success in the position. For instance, women may not be considered a good fit for a managerial position if being aggressive is seen as a characteristic of a successful manager. Due to stereotype fit, men may be considered more qualified for the position and are not only more likely to be hired, but are also more likely to be promoted as well.

== Origin ==
Role congruity theory was coined by Eagly and Karau (2002), prejudice toward female leaders occurs because inconsistencies exist between the characteristics associated with the female gender stereotype and those associated with the typical leadership.

== Implications ==
=== Women in leadership roles ===
One of the two main causes of prejudice preventing women from achievement of high-status positions or success is the perception of women when placed in leadership roles. In an article on prejudice towards female leaders, Eagly and Karau (2002) found that women who are leaders are perceived in a less positive manner when compared to male leaders. Eagly and Karau (2002) also showed that women have a more difficult time achieving high status positions in the workplace and in maintaining these positions through achievement and success. Evidence suggests that prejudice towards women in leadership positions occurs more frequently in situations where larger inconsistencies between female gender roles and leadership roles are present.

Eagly (1987) suggest women due to their socially accepted roles are more often perceived in lower status positions than those of their male counterparts. These accepted gender stereotypes allow for a greater prediction of sex differences between males and females in social behaviors.

Findings consistent with this theory can be seen in evidence presented by Eagly and Karau (1991), who found that men emerged more often than women as leaders. Although women do advance in social leadership roles, positions of leadership involving specialization or behaviors related to a groups purpose are more often attributed to men.

Ritter and Yoder (2004) provide further evidence of gender role differences in leadership positions between men and women. Women and men, based on their level of dominance, were placed in groups consisting of either (man, man), (woman, man), or (woman, woman) and then assigned task randomly. Participants with higher dominance ratings emerged as leaders in all groups except for (woman, man) pairs. When assigned tasks were of a masculine or gender-neutral nature, males emerged more often than females as leaders. These findings suggest that even when women possess dominant characteristics, masculinized task as well as gender stereotypes prohibit the emergence of women into leadership positions.

=== Women and the workplace ===
The stereotype fit hypothesis was developed by Heilman in order to evaluate the current role of women in high-power positions in the workplace. Since Heilman's initial research, many studies have been conducted to determine how women are affected by job positions which are considered to be more masculine. For example, Lyness & Heilman (2006) utilized archival organizational data from a multinational finances company to study the effects of stereotype fit on performance evaluations and promotions. Their study found upper-level female managers were rated more negatively than men in similar or lower positions and females in lower management positions. The authors also found that out of those promoted, females received more favorable ratings than their male counterparts – suggesting a more stringent threshold for promotion for women (see shifting standards). In a similar study by Eagly & Karau (2002), because of male-manager stereotypes, women are seen as less likely to fit managerial roles and, as a result, when they do achieve those positions, are looked on less favorably when performing the same managerial duties.

The stigma of women in the workplace, however, is not set in stone. According to a study by Heilman (2001), women have made considerable progress in attaining managerial positions, but there are still obstacles in the way of organizational equality; if there is any uncertainty about their skills, women are still likely to be viewed as incompetent or socially rejected.

=== Women in faculty roles ===
Research on role congruity theory further indicates that women in faculty positions struggle with meeting the expectations of the male-dominated role (Whitley & Kite, 2010). Caplan (1994) asserts characteristics associated with the female stereotype (i.e., "nurturance", "warmth", and "supportiveness") are incongruent with the expectations of faculty—which are masculine in nature (i.e., "directive", "assertive", "knowledgeable"). Therefore, a female faculty member violates societal expectations for both the categories of women and leader. This violation results in both discrepant expectations for men and women and more negative evaluations of women in such positions. Consistent with role congruity theory, Winocour, Schoen and Sirowatka (1989) found ratings of male professors were not dependent on their lecture style. However, female students were more favorable of a female professor with a discussion-based lecture style and male students only preferred female professor who focused on providing information. Further, Statham, Richardson and Cook (1991) noted students delegated more negative evaluations to female professors with a teaching style low in structure than males regardless of their teaching style. Similarly, Kierstad, D'Agostino and Dill (1988) reported that only female professors who socialized with students received positive ratings; male ratings were not affected by this factor.

=== Women in politics ===
Further research on this topic has found that the degree of femininity a woman possesses may have a major effect on the way a woman of political power is perceived. Gervais and Hillard (2011) cite the case studies of Hillary Clinton and Sarah Palin to prove their point. Gervais and Hillard suggest that Clinton and Palin may be perceived negatively by viewers because they are women in roles of power and leadership in the government, which violates the stereotypical gender norm that women can not be leaders. Because of this contradictory notion, they will be viewed less favorably. Gervais and Hillard then go on to argue that both Clinton and Palin "violate gender norms" in different ways, perhaps leading to different evaluations of their warmth and competence. Hillary Clinton presents herself in a more masculine way and this is viewed as congruent with the leadership role, but not with the feminine archetype. This type of woman who violates feminine gender roles is typically seen as competent, but harsh. Sarah Palin, on the other hand, presents herself with a very feminine attitude that falls in line with her gender role but not with the leadership role. A woman in this position is typically seen as warm, but incompetent. Due to the implications of this finding, Gervais and Hillard hypothesized that Clinton would be rated as more competent but less warm and Palin would be rated as less competent but more warm.

Gervais and Hillard also looked at the effect of benevolent sexism and hostile sexism and how these affected the perception of Clinton and Palin in regards to gender norms. Benevolent sexism is a sort of chivalrous attitude where men believe that women are in need of saving and must be looked after because they are unable to do it themselves. This type of sexism was positively associated with voting likelihood for Sarah Palin due to the prominent feminine nature of her appearance, and negatively associated with Hillary Clinton due to the more masculine nature of her appearance. Hostile sexism is defined simply as negative attitudes toward women. Both Palin and Clinton were evaluated negatively by hostile sexists, but they were still more likely to vote for Palin than Clinton because Palin is stereotypically more feminine and this falls better in line with her expected gender norms. In general, benevolent sexists will praise Palin for her femininity and hostile sexists will penalize Clinton for her rejection of feminine gender norms.

== Gender double bind ==
A double bind occurs when an individual faces two or more contradictory demands, in which a successful response to one demand means a failed response to the other. A gender specific double bind occurs due to social expectations about different roles, such as when traits positively associated with leadership conflict with traits stereotypically associated with femininity. Women in leadership positions experience a double bind situation as a result of the biases identified by role congruity theory that traps women into a bind of meeting the demands of both leadership and being a woman. Within the gender double bind, women are harshly judged or not seen as a "good fit" in leadership positions. Two biases, descriptive and prescriptive, result from this perceived dichotomy between leadership and femininity. Descriptive bias occurs when women leaders are stereotyped for having less leadership potential simply because of their gender, whereas prescriptive bias occurs because leadership is typically seen as a masculine desire, leaving women leaders typically evaluated less favorably because they are seen as violating a traditionally masculine desire. Put simply, descriptive bias is thinking, "women are docile", and prescriptive bias is "women should be docile". Both biases place female leaders into this double bind, as they are unable to express agentic behavior and emotions without negative consequences.

=== Elements of the gender double bind ===
Women in leadership positions face specific dilemmas as a result of the gender double bind, such as polarized perceptions, higher standards of competency than their male counterparts, and a conflict over being viewed as competent or well-liked.

==== Polarized perceptions ====
Women leaders are often subject to extreme, polarized perceptions based on the incongruity between traits stereotypically associated with women and traits positively associated with leadership. A 2007 reported by Catalyst found that when women act in ways that are consistent with gender stereotypes, such being relationship-focused, they are viewed as less competent leaders. When they act in ways inconsistent with gender stereotypes, such as acting ambitiously or authoritatively, they are judged as being tough and unfeminine. Regardless of the leadership style they display, women leaders face negative judgments. These negative judgments might also influence employees' overall manager preference in the workplace. Elsesser and Lever found that study participants who preferred female managers (13%) cited positive characteristics such as their compassion, warmth or interpersonal skills. However participants who preferred male managers (33%) explained their preference through reference to negative traits of female managers, saying that female managers tended to be too "emotional", "moody", or "dramatic" compared to male managers. These characterizations which are formed on stereotypical gender traits and not merit, are an example of how a descriptive bias leads employees' to incorrectly underestimate women leaders' leadership ability.

==== High threshold of competence ====
Women are subject to higher standards for leadership competence than their male counterparts. Based on respondent data, Catalyst found that women had to work harder than men in order to prove their competency and capability as leaders, by both putting in more time and energy and monitoring stereotypical expectations that they faced as women. However, this hard work had the potential negative side effect of women leaders being unfavorably judged as characteristically "trying too hard.

==== Competency vs. likability ====
Women leaders often must choose between being viewed as competent leaders or being liked by co-workers and followers. Women who adopt a "masculine" leadership style are often viewed as competent, but receive more negative evaluations of their interpersonal skills when compared to women who adopt a "feminine" style of leadership. The Catalyst report found that when women behaved in ways traditionally valued for male leaders, such as acting assertively, they were viewed as having less effective social skills and being less personable. When women assert themselves, they run the risk of being seen as "competent but cold". Those who choose to affirm their competence through expressing agency must do so at the cost of being perceived as group-focused. Female leaders who do this violate the gender assigned stereotypes, which is why women in the study were found to have less effective social skills. The double bind between competence and being well liked ultimately leads to backlash for female leaders, as they are negatively perceived if they stray too far into masculine leadership styles or feminine practices.

== Race and the workplace ==
The stereotype fit hypothesis, however, is not only confined to gender. Researchers have also studied the effect of racial and ethnical characteristics on job acquisition and placement in leadership roles. For example, in a study conducted by Rosette, Phillips and Leonardelli (2008), participants were asked to read an article about a fictitious business project involving either a racially ambiguous "leader" of the project or an "employee" working on the project. Leaders were assumed to be White more often than non-leaders – suggesting a congruity exists between the white stereotype and the leadership prototype. This suggests that stereotype fit is just as applicable when using race or ethnicity as a guideline for placement in the workforce.

An additional effect of the stereotype fit hypothesis includes rewarding certain groups over others. Studies conducted by Steele and Ambady (2004) show that when Asian women were considered for job placement as a computer technician, if the participant's Asian identity was salient over their identity as a female, they were more likely to be given a better recommendation and starting pay.

== Age and leadership ==
Recent research has expanded role congruity theory beyond gender and race to address age-based stereotypes in leadership. Daldrop, Homan, and Buengeler (2025) found that young adults (ages 25–39) may face prejudice as leaders because age-based stereotypes conflict with common leadership expectations. Specifically, younger adults are stereotyped as being dominant (e.g., demanding, risky) yet lacking essential qualities perceived as necessary for leadership, such as competence (intelligence, dedication) and communal attributes (honesty, empathy). This age bias is similar to previously documented biases against women and racial minorities in leadership roles, reinforcing the importance of aligning group stereotypes with perceived leadership expectations. The study also noted that these biases are more pronounced among older observers.

== Mitigating factors ==
A study showed that men's and women's occupancy of the same role eliminated gender-stereotypical judgments of greater agency and lower communion in men than women. Another study showed that the exhibition of pride modulates the gender-based differences in perception. That is, women exhibiting pride is perceived as having similar agency-related attributes and competencies as well as similar communality-related attributes and competencies as men.

== See also ==
- Gender discrimination
- Gender equality
- Sexism
- Gender role
- Glass cliff
- Sociology of gender
- Shifting standards model
- "Women are wonderful" effect
- Racial discrimination
