= Self and Identity =

- Discipline: Social psychology
- Language: English
- Edited by: Shira Gabriel

Publication details
- History: 2002-present
- Publisher: Taylor & Francis
- Frequency: Quarterly
- Impact factor: 1.463 (2016)

Standard abbreviations
- ISO 4: Self Identity

Indexing
- ISSN: 1529-8868 (print); 1529-8876 (web)
- LCCN: 00214802

Links
- Journal homepage; Online access; Online archive

Self and Identity is a quarterly peer-reviewed psychology journal covering the psychology of self. It was established in 2002 and is published by Taylor & Francis on behalf of the International Society for Self and Identity, of which it is the official journal. The editor-in-chief is Shira Gabriel (University at Buffalo). According to the Journal Citation Reports, the journal has a 2016 impact factor of 1.463.
