= Algernon Sydney Sullivan Foundation =

American foundation for scholarships

- Founded: 1934
- Founder: George Sullivan
- Tax ID no.: 13-6084596
- Location: Oxford, Mississippi
- Region served: Appalachian region of the Southeastern U.S
- Product: Financial Assistance
- Method: Scholarships
- Key people: George Sullivan
- Revenue: $ 1,619,549 (2017)
- Expenses: $ 655,303 (2017)
- Website: www.sullivanfdn.org

The Algernon Sydney Sullivan Foundation is an American foundation. It provides scholarships to students for approximately 61 colleges in the southeastern U.S.

== History ==
In the legacy of Algernon Sydney Sullivan and Mary Mildred Hammond Sullivan, George Sullivan established the foundation in 1934. The Foundation primarily aims at providing financial assistance to deserving students in approximately 61 colleges. The foundation also provides education in the field of Social Entrepreneurship. From 1925, the foundation has helped students in diverse fields of study, by setting up scholarships with local colleges.

== Board of trustees ==
- Gray Williams, Jr. (Trustee Emeritus)
- Stephan L. McDavid, Esq., President
- Thomas S. Rankin
- David C. Farrand
- Elizabeth Hamilton Verner
- Darla J. Wilkinson, Esq.
- John Clayton Crouch
- John C. Hardy
- Philip C. Watt
- Peter A. Rooney
- Perry Wilson
