= Heather Edelson =

American politician

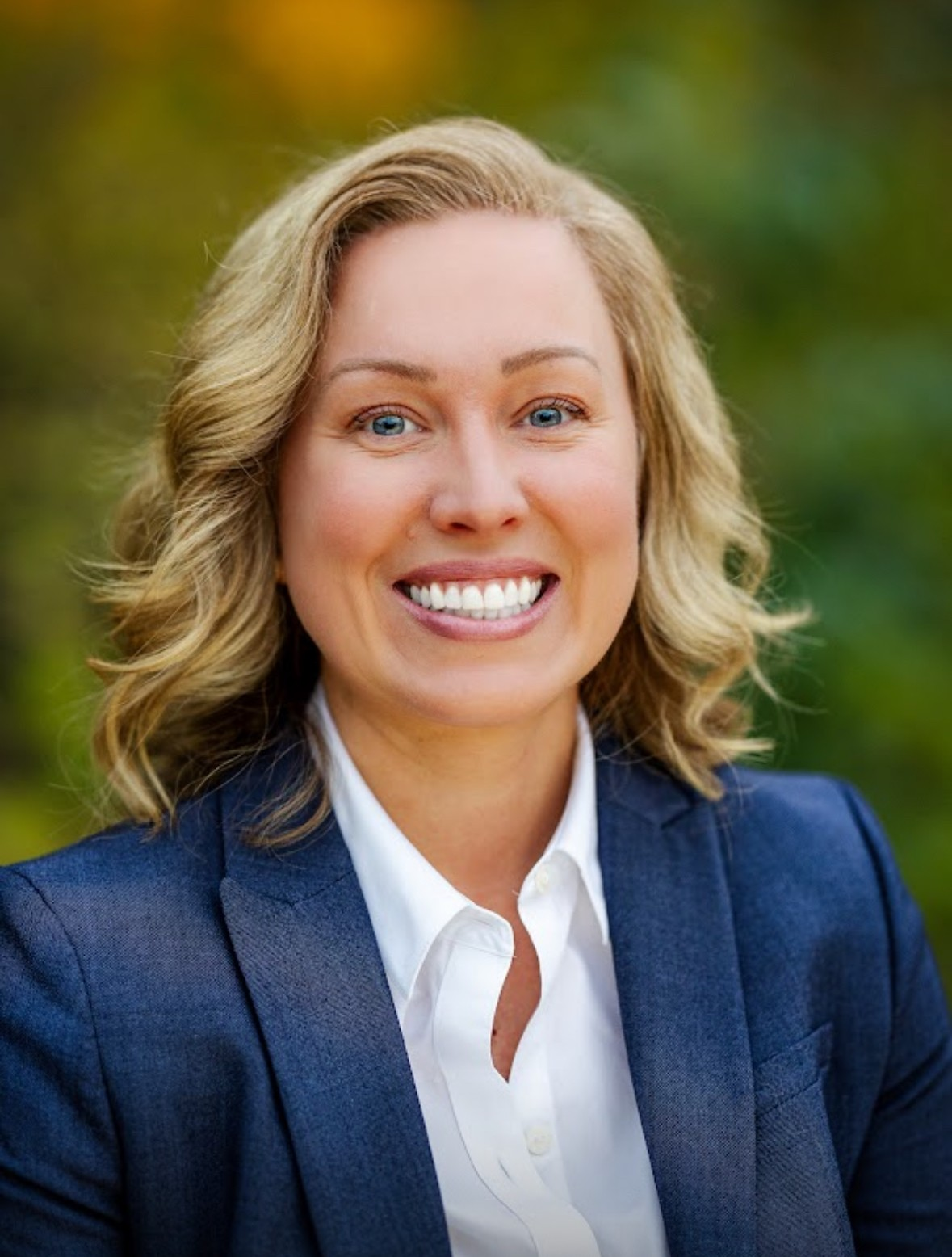

Member of the Hennepin County Board of Commissioners 6th district
- Incumbent
- Assumed office June 4, 2024
- Preceded by: Chris LaTondresse

Member of the Minnesota House of Representatives from the 50A district
- In office January 8, 2019 – May 28, 2024
- Preceded by: Dario Anselmo
- Succeeded by: Julie Greene

Personal details
- Born: April 4, 1981 (age 45)
- Party: Democratic (DFL)
- Spouse: Brett
- Children: 3
- Education: University of Minnesota (M.S.W.)
- Occupation: Lawmaker, County Commissioner
- Website: Government website Campaign website

Heather Edelson (/ˈɛdəlsən/ ED-əl-sən; born April 4, 1981) is an American politician who is a member of the Hennepin County Board of Commissioners. A member of the Minnesota Democratic–Farmer–Labor Party (DFL), she served in the Minnesota House of Representatives from 2019 to 2024, representing District 50A in the western Twin Cities metropolitan area, which includes Edina and parts of Hennepin County. In 2024, she was elected to the Hennepin County Board of Commissioners from the 6th district.

== Early life, education, and career ==
Edelson was raised in north Minneapolis and attended Columbia Heights High School. She attended Hamline University for her undergraduate studies and the University of Minnesota for her master's degree in social work.

Edelson has worked as a mental health therapist and served as a guardian ad litem in Hennepin County. She served on the Edina Public School Board Special Education Advisory Council and the Edina Race and Equity Working Group. Edelson also served as Edina's Human Rights and Relations Commissioner.

== Minnesota House of Representatives ==
Edelson was elected to the Minnesota House of Representatives in 2018 and has been reelected every two years since. She first ran for the DFL party endorsement in 2016, losing to Ron Erhardt, an 11-term incumbent who switched from the Republican to the DFL party in 2010. Erhardt lost the general election, and Edelson won the DFL endorsement in 2018, going on to defeat one-term Republican incumbent Dario Anselmo.

Edelson served as vice chair of the Ways and Means Committee, and sat on the Education Finance, Environment and Natural Resources Finance and Policy, Public Safety and Finance and Human Services Policy Committees. In 2021–22, she served as an assistant majority leader.

Edelson resigned from the Minnesota House in May 2024, after being elected to the Hennepin County Board of Commissioners.

=== Public policy ===
==== Public health and human services ====
Edelson has advocated funding school-linked mental health programs. She carried legislation that would raise the legal age of tobacco, e-cigarettes and vaping devices from 18 to 21, and supported efforts to raise youth awareness of the harms of vaping. She supported Governor Tim Walz's proposal to raise taxes on nicotine and tobacco products, saying increased revenue could go to prevention efforts.

Edelson worked with Representative Tony Albright on bipartisan legislation to fix the competency restoration program, adopting recommendations from a task force dealing with gaps in the system for those found incompetent to stand trial. She supported legislation giving incarceration alternatives for women who would otherwise be separated from their children.

==== Public safety ====
Edelson supported legislation to expedite police training to address workforce shortages, and has supported various measures to address increasing car theft in the Twin Cities metropolitan area. After a rise in antisemitic attacks, she sponsored legislation to give grants to religious groups to increase security. She has spoken in support of assisted-suicide legislation.

==== Education ====
Edelson, who has dyslexia, worked on literacy policy and investments for years in the legislature and was the primary author of the Read Act in the House of Representatives (Erin Maye Quade led the bill in the Senate).

==== Taxes ====
Edelson was the only DFL representative to vote against the 2019 House tax bill.

==== Cannabis ====
After concerns were raised over price and accessibility, Edelson authored a bill that would add the whole cannabis flower to the state's medical cannabis program, saying it would decrease reliance on painkillers and opioids. She also drafted a bill that would allow medical cannabis and CBD oil in schools for students with a doctor's approval.

In 2022, Edelson sponsored legislation to legalize food and beverages, including gummies, containing THC derived from hemp. The legislation was enacted in part to address previously unregulated delta-8 THC products already being sold in Minnesota that were targeting youth by being packaged like candy. It is unclear whether Minnesota Senate leaders understood that this legislation would legalize products with delta-9 THC. Edelson said she wrote the legislation to strengthen consumer protections in an emerging market, and that she would write bills to add additional requirements and work with local governments to help them regulate THC edibles.

== Hennepin County Board ==
Edelson won a May 14, 2024, special election for an open seat on the Hennepin County Board of Commissioners, defeating Marisa Simonetti with 54% of the approximately 11,300 votes cast.

On November 5, 2024, Edelson was reelected to the Hennepin County Board of Commissioners with 67.56% of the vote in District 6. Hennepin County Commissioners serve four-year terms. District 6 contains 16 cities: Edina, Greenwood, Hopkins, Minnetonka, Eden Prairie, Orono, Excelsior, Deephaven, Long Lake, Tonka Bay, Spring Park, Minnetonka Beach, Mound, Shorewood, and Wayzata.

== Electoral history ==
2018 Minnesota State House - District 49A
Party	Candidate	Votes	%
Democratic (DFL)	Heather Edelson	14,725	58.13
Republican	Dario Anselmo (incumbent)	10,584	41.78
Write-in		21	0.08
Total votes		25,330	100.0
Democratic (DFL) gain from Republican			

2020 Minnesota State House - District 49A
Party	Candidate	Votes	%
Democratic (DFL)	Heather Edelson (incumbent)	20,306	95.62
Write-in		931	4.38
Total votes		21,237	100.0
Democratic (DFL) hold			

2022 Minnesota State House - District 50A
Party	Candidate	Votes	%
Democratic (DFL)	Heather Edelson (incumbent)	15,087	68.57
Republican	Sami Cisman	6,882	31.28
Write-in		32	0.15
Total votes		22,001	100.0
Democratic (DFL) hold			

== Personal life ==
Edelson and her husband, Brett, live in Edina with their three children.
