= Minnesota's 51B House of Representatives district =

American legislative district

Minnesota's 51B State House of Representatives district
Representative
Nathan Coulter; DFL–Bloomington
since 2023
- Population (2020): 42,947

District 51B of Minnesota is one of 134 districts in the Minnesota House of Representatives. Located in east-central Minnesota, the district is entirely contained within Hennepin County, covering the eastern half of Bloomington, Minnesota. The district is represented by DFL Representative Nathan Coulter since January 2023.

District 51B is located within Minnesota's 51st Senate district, alongside district 51A.

== List of representatives ==
Member	Party	Residence	Counties represented	Term start	Term end	Ref.
District created
Marvin C. Schumann	NP. Con.	Rice	Benton, Sherburne, Stearns	January 2, 1967	January 5, 1969	
John A. Bares Jr.	NP. Lib.	Sauk Rapids	Benton, Sherburne, Stearns	January 6, 1969	December 31, 1972	
Mike Sieben	NP. Lib.	Newport	Washington	January 1, 1973	January 5, 1975	
Mike Sieben	DFL	Newport	Washington	January 6, 1975	January 2, 1983	
Wayne Simoneau	DFL	Fridley	Anoka, Ramsey	January 3, 1983	January 3, 1993	
Doug Swenson	Ind. Rep.	Forest Lake	Anoka, Washington	January 4, 1993	January 15, 1998	
Doug Swenson	Rep.	Forest Lake	Anoka, Washington	January 4, 1993	January 15, 1998	
--Vacant--			Anoka, Washington	January 15, 1998	February 5, 1998	
Ray Vandeveer	Rep.	Forest Lake	Anoka, Washington	February 5, 1998	January 5, 2003	
Connie Bernardy	DFL	Fridley	Anoka, Ramsey	January 6, 2003	September 4, 2006	
--Vacant--			Anoka, Ramsey	September 4, 2006	January 1, 2007	
Tom Tillberry	DFL	Fridley	Anoka, Ramsey	January 1, 2007	January 6, 2013	
Laurie Halverson	DFL	Eagan	Dakota	January 7, 2013	January 3, 2021	
Liz Reyer	DFL	Eagan	Dakota	January 4, 2021	January 1, 2023	
Nathan Coulter	DFL	Bloomington	Hennepin	January 2, 2023	Current	
