= 2021 Bloomington, Minnesota municipal election =

- November 2, 2021

The 2021 Bloomington, Minnesota municipal elections were held on November 2, 2021. Three city council seats were up for election. Four seats on the school board were also up for election. This was the first election in the city to be held using ranked-choice voting, following approval by voters in a ballot question the previous year.

== City council election ==
One at-large seat was up for election. City Council Districts III and IV were also up for election.

=== At-large ===
One of two at-large seats on the Bloomington City Council, this seat was held by incumbent Nathan Coulter since his election in 2017.

==== Candidates ====
===== Declared =====
- Nathan Coulter, incumbent
- Paul King, insurance company CEO and son of former mayor James M King
- Ricardo Oliva, former school board member

==== Endorsements ====
Nathan Coulter

Organizations

- Sierra Club
Paul King

Party chapters

- Senate District 46 Republicans (co-endorsement with Oliva)
Ricardo Oliva

Party chapters

- Senate District 46 Republicans (co-endorsement with King)

==== Results ====
Results by precinct: Coulter: 30%–40%; 40%–50%; 50%–60%

At-large results
Candidate
| Candidate | Votes | % | Transfer | Votes | % |
|---|---|---|---|---|---|
| Nathan Coulter (incumbent) | 7,127 | 45.97 | +949 | 8,084 | 56.49 |
| Paul King | 4,653 | 30.01 | +1,542 | 6,211 | 43.31 |
| Ricardo Oliva | 3,394 | 21.89 | -3,394 | Eliminated | |
| Undervotes | 290 | 1.87 | -290 | Eliminated | |
| Overvotes | 18 | 0.12 | -18 | Eliminated | |
| Write-ins | 2 | 0.14 | -2 | Eliminated | |
| Total Ballots Cast | 15,504 | 100.00 | -914 | 14,309 | 100.00 |
Source: City of Bloomington November 2, 2021 General Election

=== District III ===
District III was held by Jack Baloga since 2012. Baloga chose not to seek re-election.

==== Candidates ====
===== Declared =====
- David Clark, pilot
- Kevin Heinen
- Laura Hunt
- Lona Dallessandro, software developer

==== Endorsements ====
David Clark

Organizations

- Senate District 46 Republicans
Lona Dallessandro

Organizations

- Sierra Club
- Stonewall DFL

==== Results ====
Results by precinct: Dallessandro: 40%–50%; 50%–60%

District III results
Candidate
| Candidate | Votes | % |
|---|---|---|
| Lona Dallessandro | 2,332 | 51.66 |
| David Clark | 1,617 | 35.82 |
| Laura Hunt | 286 | 6.34 |
| Kevin Heinen | 271 | 6.00 |
| Write-ins | 7 | 0.14 |
| Inactive | 196 | N/A |
| Total Ballots Cast | 4,710 | 100.00 |
Source: City of Bloomington November 2, 2021 General Election

=== District IV ===
District IV had been held by Patrick Martin since 2018. He sought re-election.

==== Candidates ====
===== Declared =====
- Angella M. Coil, clinical specialist
- Becky Strohmeier, PCA
- Patrick Martin, incumbent city councilmember
- Victor Rivas

==== Endorsements ====
Patrick Martin

Organizations

- Sierra Club
- Run for Something
Victor Rivas

Party chapters

- Senate District 46 Republicans

==== Results ====
Results by precinct: Martin: 40%–50%; 50%–60%

District IV results
Candidate
| Candidate | Votes | % | Transfer | Votes | % |
|---|---|---|---|---|---|
| Patrick Martin (incumbent) | 1,228 | 48.12 | +79 | 1,311 | 56.66 |
| Victor Rivas | 846 | 33.15 | +154 | 1,002 | 43.30 |
| Becky Strohmeier | 209 | 8.19 | -209 | Eliminated | |
| Angella M. Coil | 168 | 6.58 | -168 | Eliminated | |
| Undervotes | 97 | 3.80 | -97 | Eliminated | |
| Write-ins | 4 | 0.16 | -3 | 1 | 0.04% |
| Total Ballots Cast | 2,552 | 100.00 | -238 | 2,314 | 100.00 |
Source: City of Bloomington November 2, 2021 General Election

== School board ==
Four seats on the school board were up for election. Thee incumbents were running for re-election. The four candidates with the most votes would be elected. Voters could vote for up to four candidates.

=== Candidates ===
==== Declared ====
- Beth Beebe, incumbent
- Dani Indovino Cawley
- Dawn Steigauf, incumbent
- Jeff Salovich
- Kat Eggers
- Marquisha Fulford
- Matthew Dymoke
- Natalie Marose
- Patricia Riley
- Tom Bennett, incumbent

=== Results ===
School board
Candidate
| Candidate | Votes | % |
|---|---|---|
| Tom Bennett (incumbent) | 7,876 | 14.77 |
| Dawn Steigauf (incumbent) | 6,936 | 13.01 |
| Matthew Dymoke | 6,730 | 12.62 |
| Beth Beebe (incumbent) | 6,702 | 12.57 |
| Dani Indovino Cawley | 5,887 | 11.04 |
| Natalie Marose | 5,700 | 10.69 |
| Jeff Salovich | 5,401 | 10.13 |
| Marquisha Fulford | 4,046 | 7.59 |
| Patricia Riley | 2,137 | 4.01 |
| Kat Eggers | 1,798 | 3.37 |
| Write-ins | 106 | 0.20 |
| Total Ballots Cast | 53,319 | 100.00 |
Source: Minnesota Secretary of State
