= Diane Anderson =

American politician

Member of the Minnesota House of Representatives from the 38A district
- In office January 4, 2011 – January 7, 2013
- Preceded by: Sandra Masin
- Succeeded by: district redrawn

Personal details
- Born: July 28, 1960 (age 65)
- Party: Republican
- Spouse: Gale
- Children: 2
- Education: University of Minnesota (BS)
- Profession: Small business owner, legislator

Diane Anderson (born July 28, 1960) is a Minnesota politician and former member of the Minnesota House of Representatives who represented District 38A, which included portions of the city of Eagan in Dakota County, which is in the southeastern Twin Cities metropolitan area. A Republican, she is also a small business owner.

Anderson was first elected to the House in 2010. She served on the Commerce and Regulatory Reform, the Health and Human Services Finance, and the Judiciary Policy and Finance committees.

Anderson graduated from the University of Minnesota in Minneapolis, earning her B.S. in housing. She is a former member of the Minnesota Department of Human Services Child Support Guidelines Task Force and the Minnesota Supreme Court Visitation and Child Support Enforcement Task Force.
