= Liz Reyer =

American politician

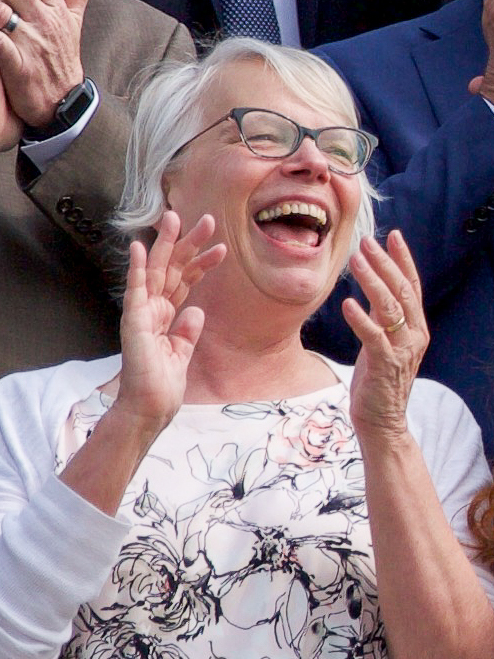

Member of the Minnesota House of Representatives District 52A (2023-present) 51B (2021-2022) (Eagan/Burnsville)
- Incumbent
- Assumed office January 5, 2021
- Preceded by: Laurie Halverson

Personal details
- Party: Democratic (DFL)
- Spouse: Jim
- Children: 4
- Education: University of Minnesota (BA); Ohio State University (MA)
- Occupation: Researcher; Leadership Coach; Business Columnist
- Website: Government website Campaign website

Liz Reyer (/ˈɹaɪəɹ/); is an American politician serving in the Minnesota House of Representatives since 2021. A member of the Democratic-Farmer-Labor Party (DFL), Reyer represents District 52A in the southern Twin Cities metropolitan area, which includes the cities of Eagan and Burnsville and parts of Dakota County, Minnesota.

== Early life, education and career ==
Reyer earned a B.A. in Chinese from the University of Minnesota and a M.A. in political science from Ohio State University. She received a graduate certificate in executive coaching in 2003 from Royal Roads University.

In 1994, Reyer joined Blue Cross Blue Shield of Minnesota, working as the director of market research and manager of the process and technology group. From 2010 to 2013, she was the insights and innovation director of Maritz, a market research firm. In 2013, Reyer joined GfK as the company's vice president and key account manager. From 2008 to 2020, Reyer contributed columns to the Star Tribune business insider section.

== Minnesota House of Representatives ==
Reyer was elected to the Minnesota House of Representatives in 2020 and was reelected in 2022. She first ran after four-term DFL incumbent Laurie Halverson announced she would not seek reelection, instead running for Dakota County Commissioner. Reyer defeated Eagan mayor Mike Maguire in the DFL primary. After 2022 legislative redistricting put Reyer in the same district as fellow DFLer Ruth Richardson, Reyer moved to Eagan to face seven-term DFL incumbent Sandra Masin, whom Reyer defeated in the primary election.

Reyer serves as vice chair of the Capital Investment Committee, and sits on the Health Finance and Policy, Human Services Finance, and Workforce Development Finance and Policy Committees.

Reyer proposed legislation that would stop private hospitals from using a state revenue recapture program to collect tax refunds for private hospital debt. She spoke about her concern that a proposed merger between the Fairview and Sanford health systems would lead to hospital closures and higher costs.

== Electoral history ==
2020 DFL Primary for Minnesota State House - District 51B
Party	Candidate	Votes	%
Democratic (DFL)	Liz Reyer	3,173	63.54
Democratic (DFL)	Mike Maguire	1,821	36.46
Total votes		4,994	100.0

2020 Minnesota State House - District 51B
Party	Candidate	Votes	%
Democratic (DFL)	Liz Reyer	15,764	60.23
Republican	Fern Smith	10,387	39.68
Write-in		24	0.09
Total votes		26,175	100.0
Democratic (DFL) hold			

2022 DFL Primary for Minnesota State House - District 52A
Party	Candidate	Votes	%
Democratic (DFL)	Liz Reyer	2,037	60.86
Democratic (DFL)	Sandra Masin	1,310	39.14
Total votes		3,347	100.0

2022 Minnesota State House - District 52A
Party	Candidate	Votes	%
Democratic (DFL)	Liz Reyer (incumbent)	11,357	61.99
Republican	Fern Smith	6,942	37.89
Write-in		21	0.11
Total votes		18,320	100.0
Democratic (DFL) hold			

2024 Minnesota State House - District 52A
Party	Candidate	Votes	%
Democratic (DFL)	Liz Reyer (incumbent)	13,784	60.88
Republican	Diane Anderson	8,833	39.01
Write-in		26	0.11
Total votes		22,643	100.00
Democratic (DFL) hold			
