= Richard Jefferson (disambiguation) =

Richard Jefferson (born 1980) is an American sports analyst and former basketball player.

Richard Jefferson may also refer to:

- Richard Jefferson (cricketer) (born 1941), English cricketer
- Richard Anthony Jefferson (born 1956), American molecular biologist
- Richard H. Jefferson (1931–2021), American politician in the Minnesota House of Representatives
