= Nathan Coulter =

American politician

Member of the Minnesota House of Representatives from the 51B district
- Incumbent
- Assumed office January 3, 2023
- Preceded by: Liz Reyer

Personal details
- Born: March 9, 1986 (age 40) Bloomington, Minnesota, U.S.
- Party: Democratic (DFL)
- Spouse: Charity
- Children: 2
- Education: St. Olaf College (BA); Humphrey School of Public Affairs (MPA)
- Occupation: Legislator
- Website: Government website Campaign website

Nathan Coulter (born March 9, 1986) is an American politician serving in the Minnesota House of Representatives since 2023. A member of the Minnesota Democratic-Farmer-Labor-Party (DFL), Coulter represents District 51B in the southwestern Twin Cities metropolitan area, which includes the city of Bloomington and parts of Hennepin County.

== Early life, education, and career ==
Coulter grew up in Bloomington, Minnesota, and received his bachelor's degree in political science and music from St. Olaf College. He earned a Master of Public Administration in health, housing, education policy and leadership from the Humphrey School of Public Affairs.

Coulter worked at the Minnesota Senate for ten years as a legislative assistant and DFL researcher. He has served on the Board of Directors of the Perpich Center for Arts Education and twice as a commissioner of the Bloomington Housing and Redevelopment Authority, from 2015 to 2019 and from 2022 to 2023.

Coulter served on the Bloomington City Council from 2018 until he was elected to the legislature. While on the council in 2022, Coulter said he supported a city mask mandate to slow the spread of COVID-19, but that a statewide mandate would be more effective.

== Minnesota House of Representatives ==
Coulter was elected to the Minnesota House of Representatives in 2022. He first ran for an open seat created by the 2022 legislative redistricting process.

Coulter serves on the Children and Families Finance and Policy, Elections Finance and Policy, Higher Education Finance and Policy, and Veterans and Military Affairs Finance and Policy Committees and the Property Tax Division of the Taxes Committee.

=== Political positions ===
Coulter authored a law that changed the state's renters refund program to an income tax credit, so that more renters will automatically receive a benefit they qualify for. He supported legislation that would restore the right to vote to Minnesotans convicted of a felony offense while they are serving parole, citing that the policy had been adopted already by Republican-controlled states like Utah.

Coulter authored legislation in 2023 that would award a $5 million grant for planning for a possible World's Fair Expo in Bloomington in 2027, saying the expo would be an economic benefit to the state. On June 21, 2023, it was announced that the bid went to Serbia, leaving the money unspent.

== Electoral history ==
2022 Minnesota State House - District 51B
Party	Candidate	Votes	%
Democratic (DFL)	Nathan Coulter	10,041	61.57
Republican	Chad Anderson	6,249	38.32
Write-in		19	0.12
Total votes		16,309	100.0
Democratic (DFL) hold			

2024 Minnesota State House - District 51B
Party	Candidate	Votes	%
Democratic (DFL)	Nathan Coulter (incumbent)	13,244	64.08
Republican	Lion Dale Johnson	7,373	35.67
Write-in		51	0.25
Total votes		20,668	100.00
Democratic (DFL) hold			

== Personal life ==
Coulter lives in Bloomington, Minnesota, with his spouse, Charity, and has two children.
