= Carleton Crawford =

Former chair of the Minnesota Republican Party

Chair of the Minnesota Republican Party
- Acting
- In office August 19, 2021 – October 2, 2021
- Preceded by: Jennifer Carnahan
- Succeeded by: David Hann

Personal details
- Party: Republican
- Education: Carleton College (BA); University of Minnesota (MArch)

Carleton Crawford is a former acting chair for the Republican Party of Minnesota. He assumed the role when Jennifer Carnahan resigned under pressure from state party officials on August 19, 2021, amid several scandals, including the Anton Lazzaro sex trafficking arrest and scandal. He had previously served as the deputy chair for the Republican Party of Minnesota.

Party political offices
Preceded by Jennifer Carnahan	Chair of the Minnesota Republican Party; Acting; 2021	Succeeded by David Hann
