= Michael Howard (American politician) =

American politician (born 1983)

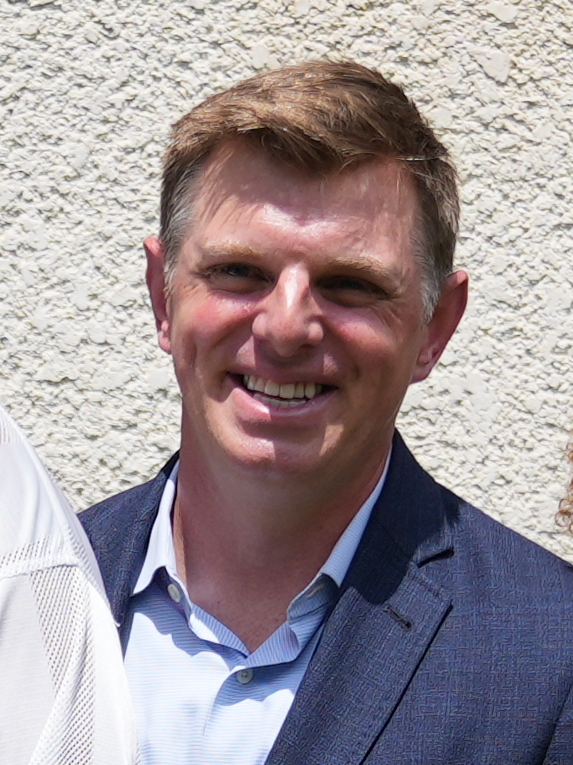

Member of the Minnesota House of Representatives from the 51A district
- Incumbent
- Assumed office January 8, 2019
- Preceded by: Linda Slocum

Personal details
- Born: February 17, 1983 (age 43)
- Party: Democratic (DFL)
- Spouse: Sarah
- Children: 2
- Education: Augsburg College (B.A.)
- Occupation: Public relations manager; Communications; Legislator
- Website: Government website Campaign website

Michael "Mike" Howard (born February 17, 1983) is an American politician serving since 2019 in the Minnesota House of Representatives. A member of the Minnesota Democratic–Farmer–Labor Party (DFL), Howard represents District 51A in the south-central Twin Cities metropolitan area, which includes the city of Richfield and parts of Minneapolis in Hennepin County.

== Early life, education, and career ==
Howard was raised in Becker, Minnesota. He attended Augsburg College, graduating with a Bachelor of Arts in political science. During college, he was an intern for U.S. Senator Paul Wellstone's 2002 campaign.

After graduating, Howard worked as a personal care assistant for children with autism. He worked on Mike Freeman's 2006 campaign for Hennepin County Attorney and was a legislative clerk in the Minnesota Senate. From 2007 to 2011, he worked as a communications specialist for the Minnesota House DFL Caucus. After a brief period as a public affairs manager at the Minnesota Department of Education, Howard returned to the House Caucus to work as public affairs director. He was promoted to communications director in 2012 and held that position until 2016. In 2018, Howard was hired as the Host Committee spokesman for Super Bowl LII, held in Minneapolis.

Howard served on the Richfield city council from 2014 to 2018, while also working at the Minnesota House. On the city council, he supported a measure giving city employees paid parental leave and worked to increase affordable housing. When Richfield mayor Debbie Goettel stepped down to join the Hennepin County Board in 2016, Howard was named interim mayor until a special election was held. As interim mayor, he called for city police to use body cameras.

== Minnesota House of Representatives ==
Howard was elected to the Minnesota House of Representatives in 2018 and has been reelected every two years since. He first ran after six-term DFL incumbent Linda Slocum announced she would not seek reelection. Howard had previously announced his intention to run for mayor of Richfield, but said he would run for the House seat vacated by Slocum, who endorsed him for the seat.

Howard chairs the Housing Finance and Policy Committee and sits on the Rules and Legislative Administration, Taxes, and Ways and Means Committees. From 2021 to 2022 he served as vice chair of the Housing Finance and Policy Committee and as an assistant majority leader.

=== Housing ===
As chair of the Housing Committee, Howard has said that housing should "be one of our top priorities" and unveiled a $3 billion package aimed at ending child homelessness, decreasing racial housing disparities, and increasing housing supply. He has supported major increases in housing investments and increasing pre-eviction notice requirements, eviction expungement, and laws protecting against discrimination towards those in Section 8 housing. Howard proposed an increase in the Twin Cities metropolitan area sales tax that would be used by counties and cities to build affordable housing and fund the state rental assistance program.

Howard has supported creating a state-based rent subsidy program for low-income Minnesotans, saying roughly 550,000 Minnesotans spend too much of their income on rent. He authored the "Bring It Home, MN" rent subsidy legislation that would increase investments in rent subsidies for low-income tenants. He has supported funding for temporary shelters and legislation ending cities power to impose development moratoriums on affordable housing projects.

During the COVID-19 pandemic, Howard supported calls for a moratorium on evictions and money for relief for renters and rental owners, and pressed for greater tenant protections when ending the eviction pause. He worked on a bipartisan agreement to provide a statutory off-ramp for the eviction moratorium. He authored legislation to put $50 million in the emergency rental assistance program to respond to an increase in evictions following the pandemic. In 2020, he criticized state senator Justin Eichorn for comments comparing homelessness to restrictions on camping during the pandemic.

=== Alec Smith Insulin Affordability Act ===
Before he was sworn in to the House, Howard announced he would introduce legislation to make insulin more affordable. He wrote a bill increasing fees on pharmaceutical companies to create an assistance program to help people get emergency supplies of insulin. The proposal failed to advance due to opposition by House and Senate Republicans, and Howard said he was never given a "substantive reason" for the lack of action. He was part of a working group with Senate Republicans and Governor Tim Walz's office and attempted to reach a compromise on eligibility, access, and drug manufacturers' role in funding the program.

In 2020, the House passed Howard's legislation to increase fees on drugmakers to pay for an emergency insulin program. He again worked with Senate Republicans on a compromise between the two bills, eventually agreeing to a proposal imposing fines on companies that failed to cooperate with the program. The bill, named the "Alec Smith Insulin Affordability Act" after a diabetic who died in 2017 due to rationing insulin he couldn't afford, passed the House by a vote of 111-22, and was signed by Walz. Howard criticized PhRMA for suing to stop the program, and a Minnesota judge dismissed the lawsuit. He sponsored bipartisan legislation to regulate pharmacy benefit managers' ability to set prices for certain prescription drugs.

=== Other political positions ===
Howard co-wrote an op-ed opposing full repeal of the tax on social security income in Minnesota, and supported increasing taxes on wealthy Minnesotans to fund education and housing. He supported the city of Bloomington's ordinance banning the use of conversion therapy in the city. Howard sponsored legislation to ban for-profit immigration detention centers in Minnesota.

Howard opposed bailing out private entities like the Mall of America, which is in his district, during the COVID-19 pandemic. He called for COVID vaccination programs to prioritize health care workers, the elderly, and the chronically ill, and opposed Republican leaders calling for legislators to receive early vaccinations.

Howard has supported legislation to relax local zoning rules in smaller cities to permit duplexes and larger cities to permit duplexes, cottage clusters, townhouses, and small apartment buildings.

== Election history ==
2018 Minnesota State House - District 50A
Party	Candidate	Votes	%
Democratic (DFL)	Michael Howard	12,359	68.24
Republican	Kirsten Johnson	5,730	31.64
Write-in		22	0.12
Total votes		18,111	100.0
Democratic (DFL) hold			

2020 Minnesota State House - District 50A
Party	Candidate	Votes	%
Democratic (DFL)	Michael Howard (incumbent)	14,626	68.53
Republican	Tim Johnson	6,692	31.35
Write-in		25	0.12
Total votes		21,343	100.0
Democratic (DFL) hold			

2022 Minnesota State House - District 51A
Party	Candidate	Votes	%
Democratic (DFL)	Michael Howard (incumbent)	12,524	74.16
Republican	Ryan Wiskerchen	4,339	25.69
Write-in		25	0.15
Total votes		16,888	100.0
Democratic (DFL) hold			

2024 Minnesota State House - District 51A
Party	Candidate	Votes	%
Democratic (DFL)	Michael Howard (incumbent)	15,440	73.44
Republican	Jeffrey Thompson	5,533	26.32
Write-in		51	0.24
Total votes		21,024	100.00
Democratic (DFL) hold			

== Personal life ==
Howard and his wife, Sarah, have two children. He lives in Richfield, Minnesota.
