= Alice Johnson (politician) =

American politician (1941–2025)

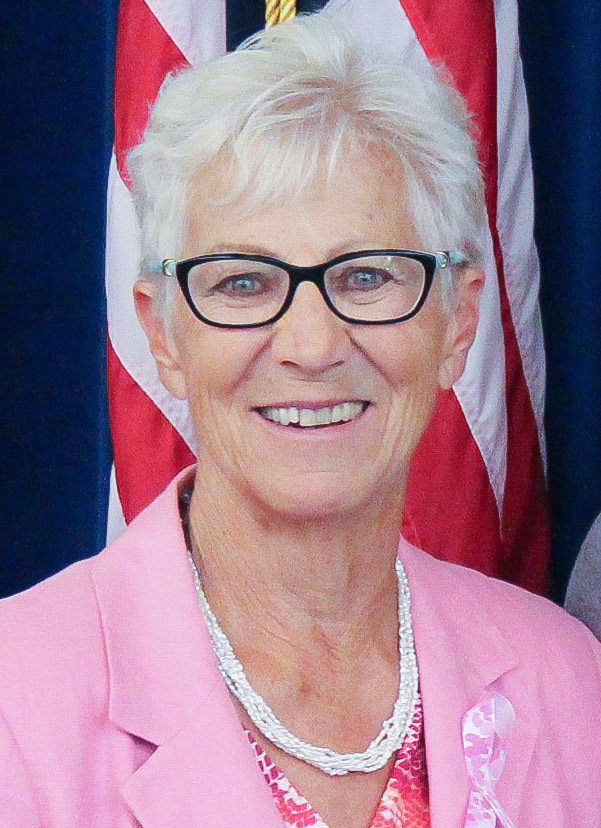

Member of the Minnesota Senate from the 37th district
- In office January 8, 2013 – January 2, 2017
- Preceded by: Pam Wolf (District 51)
- Succeeded by: Jerry Newton

Member of the Minnesota House of Representatives from the 48B district 51A (1987–1993)
- In office January 6, 1987 – January 2, 2001
- Preceded by: Gordon Backlund
- Succeeded by: Connie Bernardy

Personal details
- Born: April 1, 1941
- Died: April 11, 2025 (aged 84)
- Party: Minnesota Democratic–Farmer–Labor Party
- Spouse: Richard H. Jefferson (m. 1999; died 2021)
- Children: 4
- Education: Metropolitan State University; Minneapolis Community College (A.A.); Concordia University (B.A.); Harvard University (M.A.)

Alice M. Johnson (April 1, 1941 – April 11, 2025) was a Minnesota politician and former member of the Minnesota Senate. A member of the Minnesota Democratic–Farmer–Labor Party (DFL), she represented District 37 in the northern Twin Cities metropolitan area.

== Education ==
Johnson attended Metropolitan State University, Minneapolis Community College—graduating with an A.A., Concordia University—graduating with a B.A., and Harvard University—graduating with a M.A. in 1996.

== Minnesota House of Representatives ==
Johnson was first elected to the Minnesota House of Representatives in 1986 and was re-elected every two years until she retired in 2000.

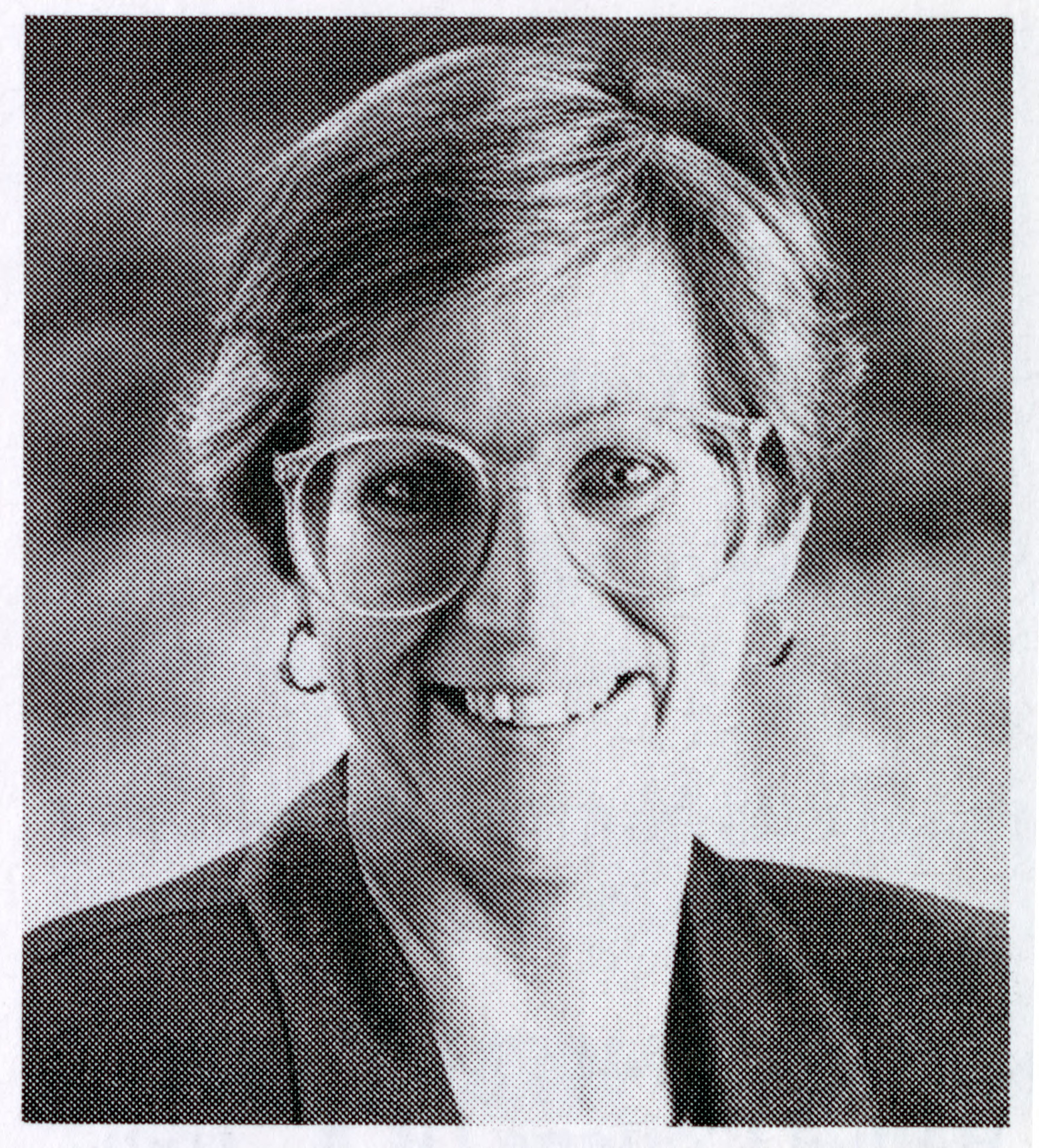
Portrait of Minnesota Representative Alice M. Johnson, 1991-1992 Legislative Session.

== 1992 congressional campaign ==
Johnson ran unsuccessfully for election to the United States House of Representatives in 1992. She lost the DFL endorsement to Gary Sikorski.

== Minnesota Senate ==
Johnson was first elected to the Minnesota Senate in 2012. She did not seek re-election in 2016.

== Personal life ==
Johnson was married to Richard H. Jefferson, who served in the Minnesota House of Representatives from 1987 to 1999. They reside in Spring Lake Park, Minnesota. She is a retired chemist who worked for the United States Bureau of Mines.
