= Tony Albright =

American politician

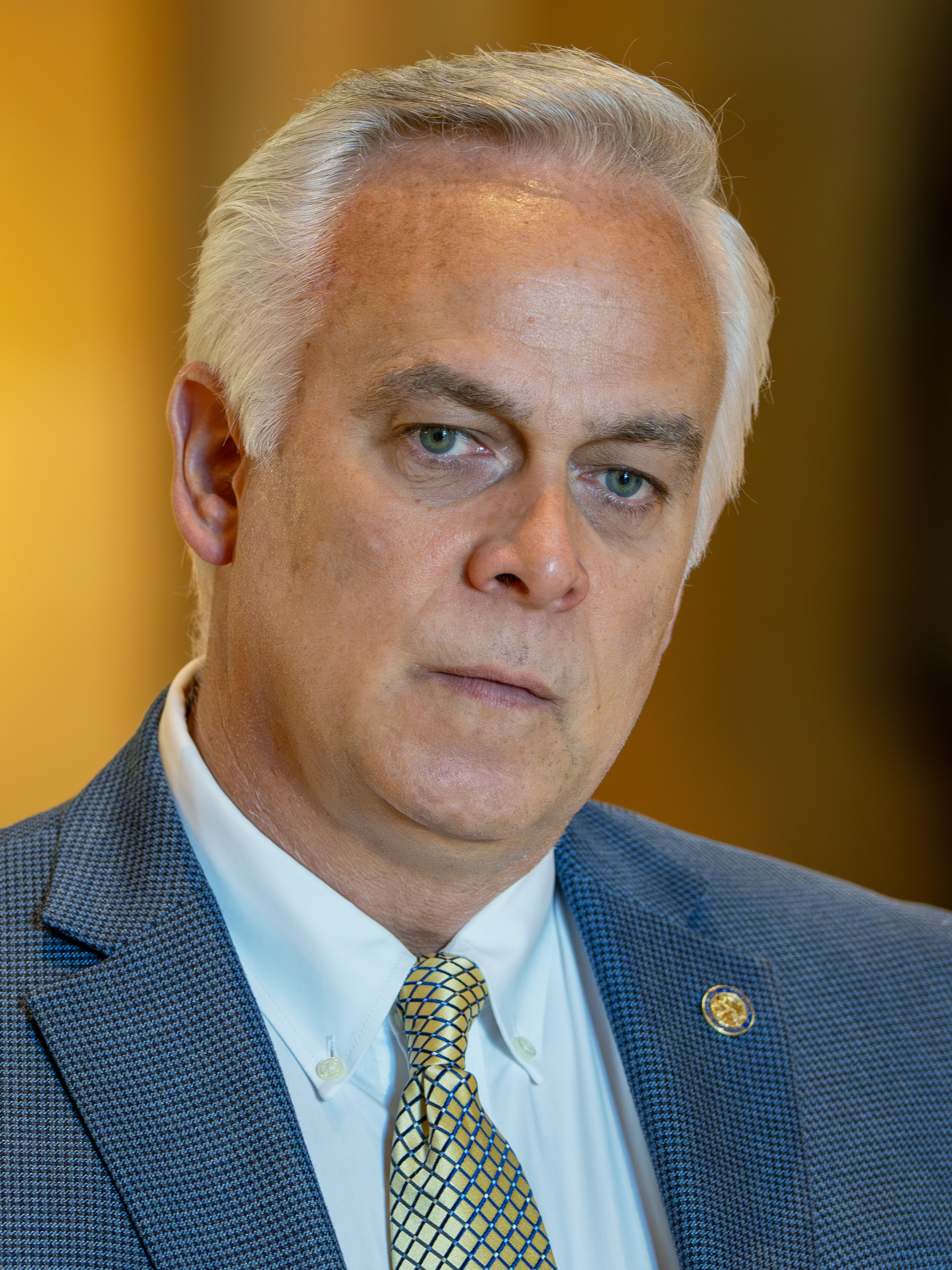

Speaker pro tempore of the Minnesota House of Representatives
- In office January 3, 2017 – January 8, 2019
- Preceded by: Tim O'Driscoll
- Succeeded by: Laurie Halverson

Member of the Minnesota House of Representatives from the 55B district
- Incumbent
- Assumed office January 8, 2013
- Preceded by: Redistricted

Personal details
- Born: April 2, 1962 (age 64)
- Party: Republican
- Spouse: Marianne
- Children: 3
- Education: Minnesota State University Moorhead (BS)

Anthony Albright (born April 2, 1962) is a Minnesota politician and former member of the Minnesota House of Representatives. A member of the Republican Party of Minnesota, he represented District 55B in the southwestern Twin Cities metropolitan area. On March 17, 2022, he announced that he would not seek reelection to a sixth term to follow other personal career goals.

== Education ==
Albright attended Moorhead State University, graduating with a B.S. in business administration.

== Minnesota House of Representatives ==
Albright was elected to the Minnesota House of Representatives in 2012.

== Political Positions ==
In December 2021, Albright signed a letter along with 37 other Republicans in opposition of the Mayo Clinic for its vaccine mandate policy for employees, calling for a halt in state funding for health care facilities that fire employees "due to unrealistic vaccine mandate policies".

=== Abortion ===
Albright is anti-abortion-rights with "no exceptions" and, when specifically asked, claimed that he believed a 10-year-old rape victim should be availed to all options in order to support the life of the child.

== Personal life ==
Albright is married to his wife, Marianne. They have three children and reside in Prior Lake, Minnesota. He is a financial advisor.

Minnesota House of Representatives
Preceded by Tim O'Driscoll	Speaker pro tempore of the Minnesota House of Representatives; 2017–2019	Succeeded by Laurie Halverson
