= Keith Downey (politician) =

American politician

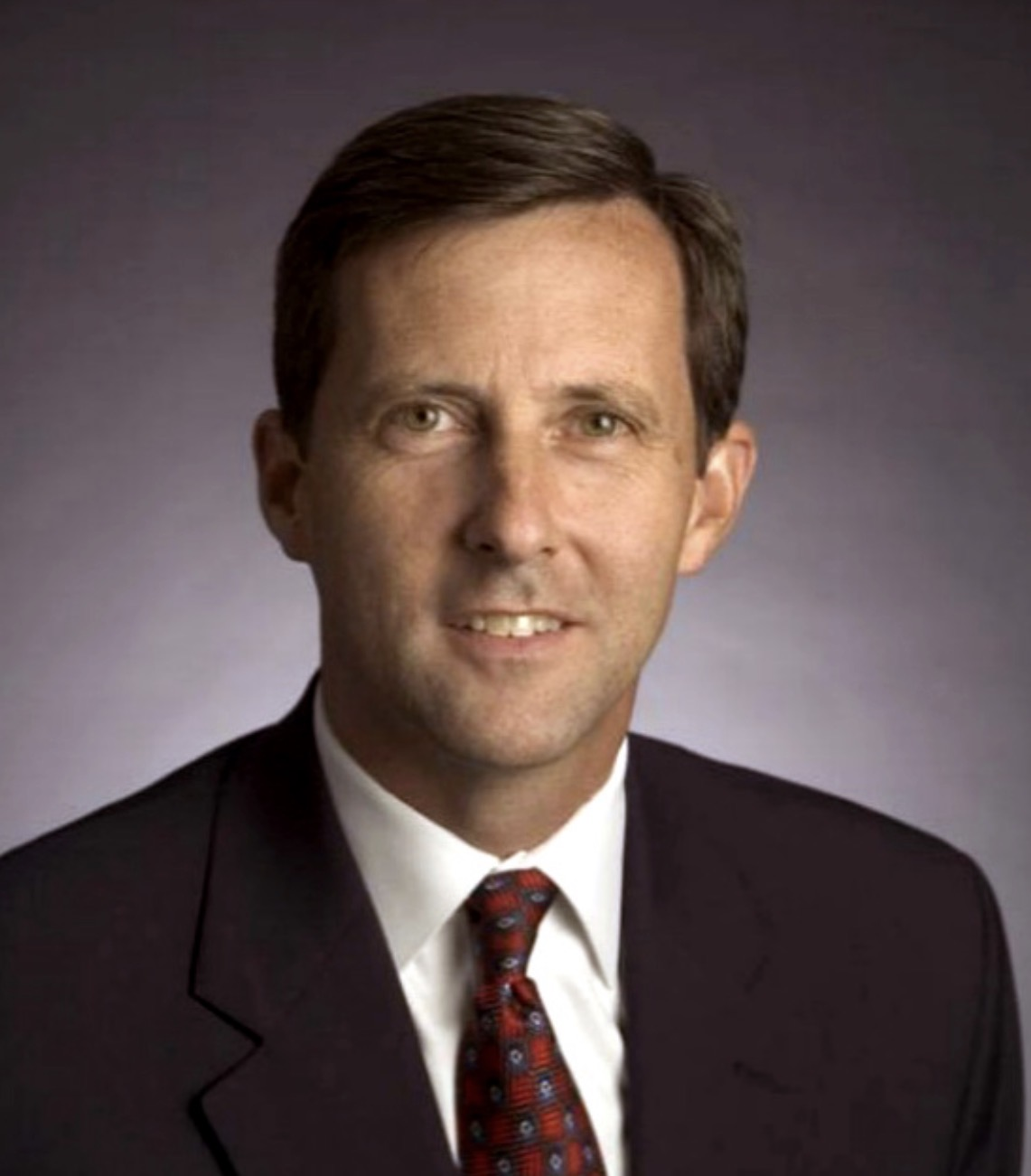
- Downey in 2018

Chair of the Minnesota Republican Party
- In office April 6, 2013 – May 1, 2017
- Preceded by: Pat Shortridge
- Succeeded by: Jennifer Carnahan

Member of the Minnesota House of Representatives from the 41A district
- In office January 6, 2009 – January 8, 2013
- Preceded by: Ron Erhardt
- Succeeded by: Connie Bernardy

Personal details
- Born: November 10, 1960 (age 66) Edina, Minnesota, U.S.
- Party: Republican
- Spouse: Amy Downey
- Children: 3
- Education: University of Wisconsin, Eau Claire (BBA)

Keith S. Downey (born November 10, 1960) is a former Minnesota politician and the former chairman of the Republican Party of Minnesota. Previously he was a member of the Minnesota House of Representatives, he represented District 41A, which included most of the city of Edina in Hennepin County in the southwestern Twin Cities metropolitan area. He was also a consultant for state and local governments on strategy, operations, and technology. Downey was a candidate for the Republican endorsement for Governor in 2018, bowing out in May of that year after former Republican Governor Tim Pawlenty entered the race for the primary. Having moved to Montana in 2020, Downey founded the Big Sky Center for Biblical Citizenship and is also Director of the Church Ambassador Network of Montana.

== Early life, education, and career ==
Downey grew up in Edina, Minnesota, graduating from Edina East High School in 1979. He went on to the University of Wisconsin in Eau Claire, where he received his B.B.A. in 1983. Prior to his political work, he was a partner with Virchow Krause (now Baker Tilly), and also previously worked for Unisys and Epic Systems.

== Minnesota House of Representatives ==
Downey was first elected to the Minnesota House of Representatives in 2008, defeating nine-term Rep. Ron Erhardt, and was re-elected in 2010. He was a member of the House's K-12 Education Policy and Oversight Committee and Taxes Committee, and also served on the Finance subcommittees for the Early Childhood Finance and Policy Division, on which he was the ranking minority party member, the Higher Education and Workforce Development Finance and Policy Division, and the State Government Finance Division, and as Vice Chair of The Ways and Means Committee.

== 2012 Minnesota Senate campaign ==
In 2012, after incumbent state senator Geoff Michel (Senate District 41) decided not to run for re-election to the Senate, Keith Downey decided not to seek re-election to the House seat (41B) and instead sought election to the State Senate for newly renumbered Senate District 49. In the general election of November 2012, Downey was defeated by the DFL endorsed candidate Melisa Franzen. The race was the most expensive in state history.

== Leadership of the Republican Party of Minnesota ==
Downey was elected the Chair of the Republican Party of Minnesota on April 6, 2013, succeeding Pat Shortridge. Downey took over after Republicans had lost both the Minnesota House and Senate in the 2012 election and had incurred significant debt. In Downey's two terms as Chair, while reducing the party's debt, Republicans won the House majority in the 2014 election, and won both the House and Senate majorities in 2016.

== Personal life ==
Downey is married to his wife, Amy. They have three children. He was a member of the Minneapolis Regional and Edina Chambers of Commerce. From 2004 to 2007, he served the Minneapolis Regional Chamber as a board member, executive committee member and public policy committee chairman. He was a member of the Hennepin County SW Transportation Corridor Policy Advisory Committee from 2006 to 2008. In 2008, Governor Tim Pawlenty appointed him as a board member of the Minnesota Academic Excellence Foundation.

Party political offices
| Preceded by Pat Shortridge | Chair of the Minnesota Republican Party; 2013–2017 | Succeeded by Jennifer Carnahan |
