= Dario Anselmo =

American politician

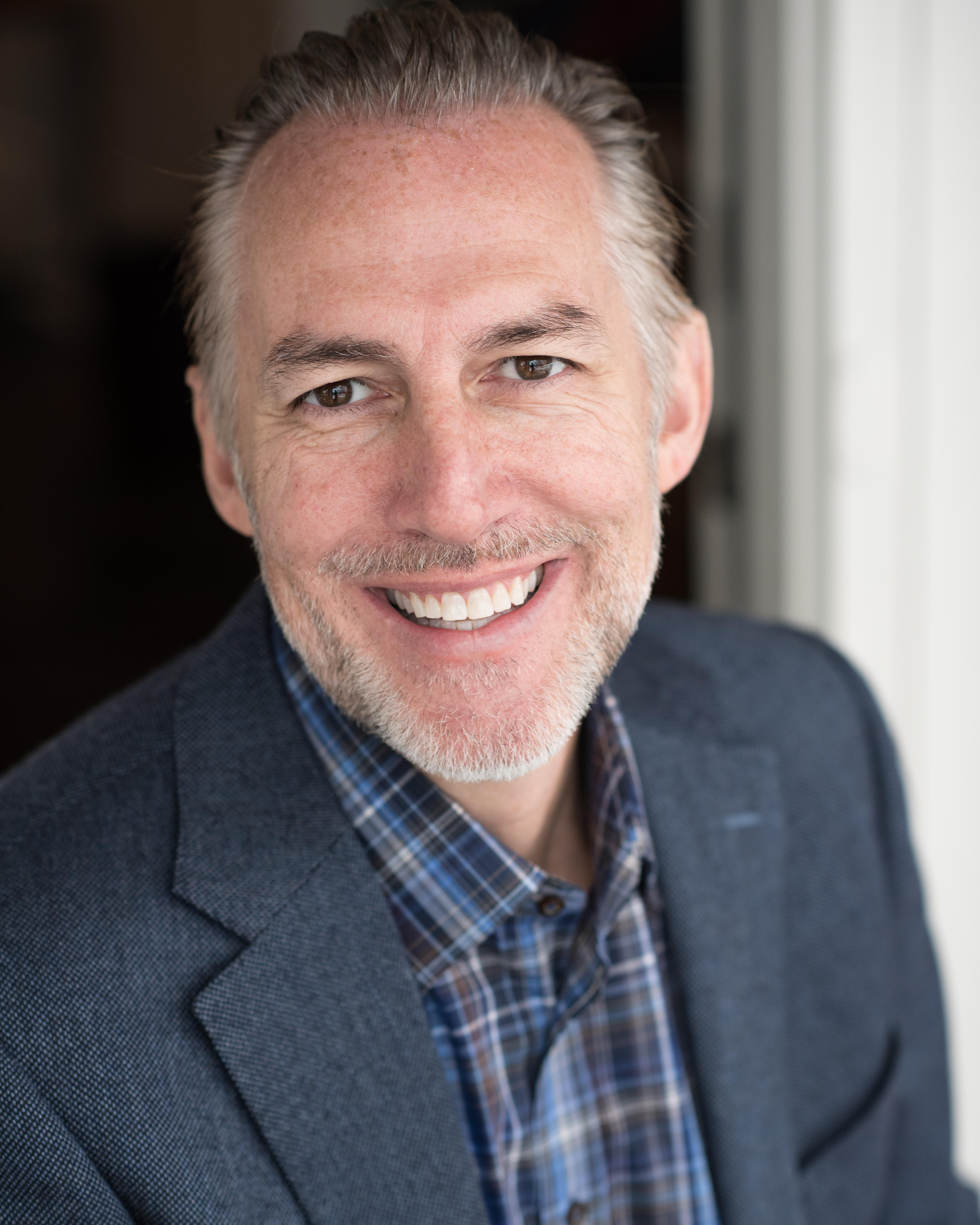

Member of the Minnesota House of Representatives from the 49A district
- In office January 3, 2017 – January 8, 2019
- Preceded by: Ron Erhardt
- Succeeded by: Heather Edelson

Personal details
- Born: May 2, 1962 (age 64)
- Party: Nonpartisan (2019–present)
- Other political affiliations: Republican (until 2019)
- Spouse: Jeanne Anselmo
- Children: 3
- Education: Whittier College; Boston University; University of Minnesota

Dario Anselmo (born May 2, 1962) is an American politician and former member of the Minnesota House of Representatives. He is nonpartisan-affiliated.

== Early life, education, and career ==
Anselmo was born on May 2, 1962. His father was a district court judge in Duluth, Minnesota. He grew up in Orono, MN and graduated from Orono High School before attending Whittier College, Boston University, and the University of Minnesota. He studied business administration and management at Whittier and Boston University and studied history and political science at the University of Minnesota.

At age 21, Dario co-founded a technology company that dealt with the emerging market for personal computers called Radix, Inc. After his first business, Anselmo went on to own the Fine Line Music Cafe in Minneapolis for 20 years before selling it in 2013. He served on the boards of several non-profit and civic groups, including Edina Give and Go, the Edina Education Fund, and the Minneapolis Downtown Council. Anselmo was also the president of the Depression and Bipolar Support Alliance, which later merged with the Mental Health Association of Minnesota.

He is a co-founder of the Warehouse District Business Association and a commercial real estate owner and operator.

== Minnesota House of Representatives ==
Anselmo was first elected to the Minnesota House of Representatives in 2016, as a Republican representing District 49A in the southwestern Twin Cities metropolitan area. He sat on the Education Committee and Legacy Funding Committee.

While in office, Anselmo introduced legislation to increase the age required to purchase cigarettes, e-cigarettes, and chewing tobacco in Minnesota to 21 and co-sponsored legislation for universal background checks before gun purchases. Later, Anselmo appeared on the Twin Cites PBS show Almanac to discuss the need for “Tobacco 21” legislation.

He also passed a bill that reduced Social Security taxes by 50% and co-authored a bill to reduce property taxes for small businesses.

According to the Pioneer Press, Anselmo held an W-NOMINATE score of 0.197, which made him one of the most moderate members of the state legislature during his tenure.

In 2018, Anselmo lost his re-election bid to Heather Edelson. After Anselmo's loss, he shared a drink with Edelson that ended up in a story on MPR News online.

== 2020 Hennepin County Commissioner Election ==
On October 30, 2019, Anselmo announced his run for Hennepin County Commissioner in District 6. The seat is currently held by Jan Callison, who announced that she would not be running for re-election.

On August 11, 2020, Anselmo advanced from the primary election. He lost in the general election on November 3, 2020.

== Personal life ==
Anselmo and his wife, Jeanne, have resided in Edina, Minnesota for the past twenty years. They have three children, all of whom have or are currently attending Edina High School.
