= Peter C. Nelson =

American businessman and politician

Peter Christian "Pete" Nelson (June 24, 1948 – June 24, 2013) was an American businessman and politician.

From Lindstrom, Minnesota, Nelson served in the United States Marine Corps. He was the owner of a meat processing center and sales business and community market and deli. Nelson served on the Lindstrom City Council and as mayor. From 2003 to 2007, Nelson served in the Minnesota House of Representatives and was a Republican. His father, Howard I. Nelson, and his niece, Laurie Halverson, also served in the Minnesota Legislature.
