= David Hann =

American politician

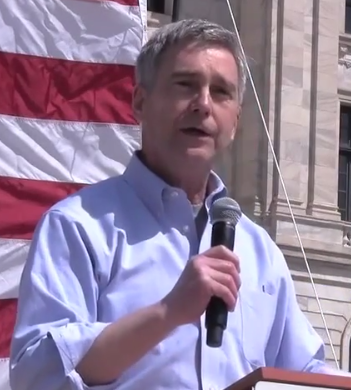

Chair of the Minnesota Republican Party
- In office October 2, 2021 – January 1, 2025
- Preceded by: Jennifer Carnahan
- Succeeded by: Alex Plechash

Minority Leader of the Minnesota Senate
- In office January 8, 2013 – January 2, 2017
- Preceded by: Tom Bakk
- Succeeded by: Tom Bakk

Member of the Minnesota Senate
- In office January 7, 2003 – January 2, 2017
- Preceded by: Roy Terwilliger
- Succeeded by: Steve Cwodzinski
- Constituency: 42nd district (2003–2013); 48th district (2013–2017)

Personal details
- Born: April 16, 1952 (age 74) Minneapolis, Minnesota, U.S.
- Party: Republican
- Spouse: Anne
- Children: 4
- Education: Gustavus Adolphus College (BA); University of Chicago (attended)

David W. Hann (born April 16, 1952) is an American politician and a former minority leader of the Minnesota Senate. A Republican, he represented District 48, which consisted of the cities of Eden Prairie and Minnetonka, from 2003-2017. He was the chair of the Republican Party of Minnesota from 2021 to 2024.

== Early life, education, and career ==
Hann was born and raised in Minneapolis, Minnesota. He attended Lincoln High School in Bloomington, Minnesota, then served in the United States Army during the Vietnam War. He attended Gustavus Adolphus College in St. Peter, Minnesota, earning a B.A. in Religion, and took graduate studies in Theology at the University of Chicago.

Hann is a business process consultant. He used to be the Director of Forecasting and Logistics for E.A. Sween Company, also known as Deli Express, in Eden Prairie. He is also a former member of the Eden Prairie School Board, where he also served as clerk and treasurer. He is a member of the board of directors of the Hiawatha Leadership Academy, and is president of Parents for Accountable Schools.

== Minnesota Senate ==
Hann served as an assistant Majority Leader from January through December 2011. He served on the Rules and Administration Committee. He has been chair of the Health and Human Services Committee and also served on the Education and Finance committees. He was an assistant minority leader from 2007 to 2009. His special legislative concerns included education, education reform, taxes, tax relief, business, improved business climate, family law, and agriculture.

Hann has run unsuccessfully to be the Republican leader in the Minnesota Senate multiple times, most recently losing in 2011 to former Majority Leader David Senjem. Following the loss of the Republican majority in the 2012 election, Hann was elected by his caucus to serve as minority leader.

Hann lost re-election to Minnesota Democratic–Farmer–Labor Party (DFL) candidate Steve Cwodzinski in 2016.

== 2010 Minnesota gubernatorial campaign ==
On July 16, 2009, Hann announced his candidacy for governor of Minnesota. After statewide polling during and after the 2010 caucuses showed him trailing other contenders, he withdrew from the race on February 16, 2010, opting to focus on re-election to the Minnesota Senate.

Minnesota Senate
Preceded by Tom Bakk	Minority Leader of the Minnesota Senate; 2013–2017	Succeeded by Tom Bakk
Party political offices
Preceded by Carleton Crawford; Acting	Chair of the Minnesota Republican Party; 2021–2025	Succeeded by Alex Plechash
