= Conservative Solutions Project =

American conservative organization

- Formation: 2014
- Type: 501(c)(4) tax exempt organization
- Region served: United States
- President: Pat Shortridge
- Website: conservativesolutionsproject.com

Conservative Solutions Project is a non-profit political organization founded in 2014 that has raised $15.8 million of funding for the 2016 U.S. Presidential Campaign of Marco Rubio. Pat Shortridge is the president of the organization.

The Agenda; "Working with bold, persuasive leaders to bring Conservative Solutions to the problems that currently plague our nation. By engaging citizens so America beats Washington, we can transform the tax code, restore our military and America's standing in the world, and shrink and restructure the federal government."

Leading up to the Florida 2016 primary, news outlets reporting that Conservative Solutions has "aired more than 2,300 spots in the Sunshine state and is slated to spend more than $8.7 million on radio and television ads ahead of the state's March 15, 2016 primary"; the most spent in any one state since New Hampshire, according to Kantar Media's Campaign Media Analysis Group.
