= Laurie Halverson =

American politician

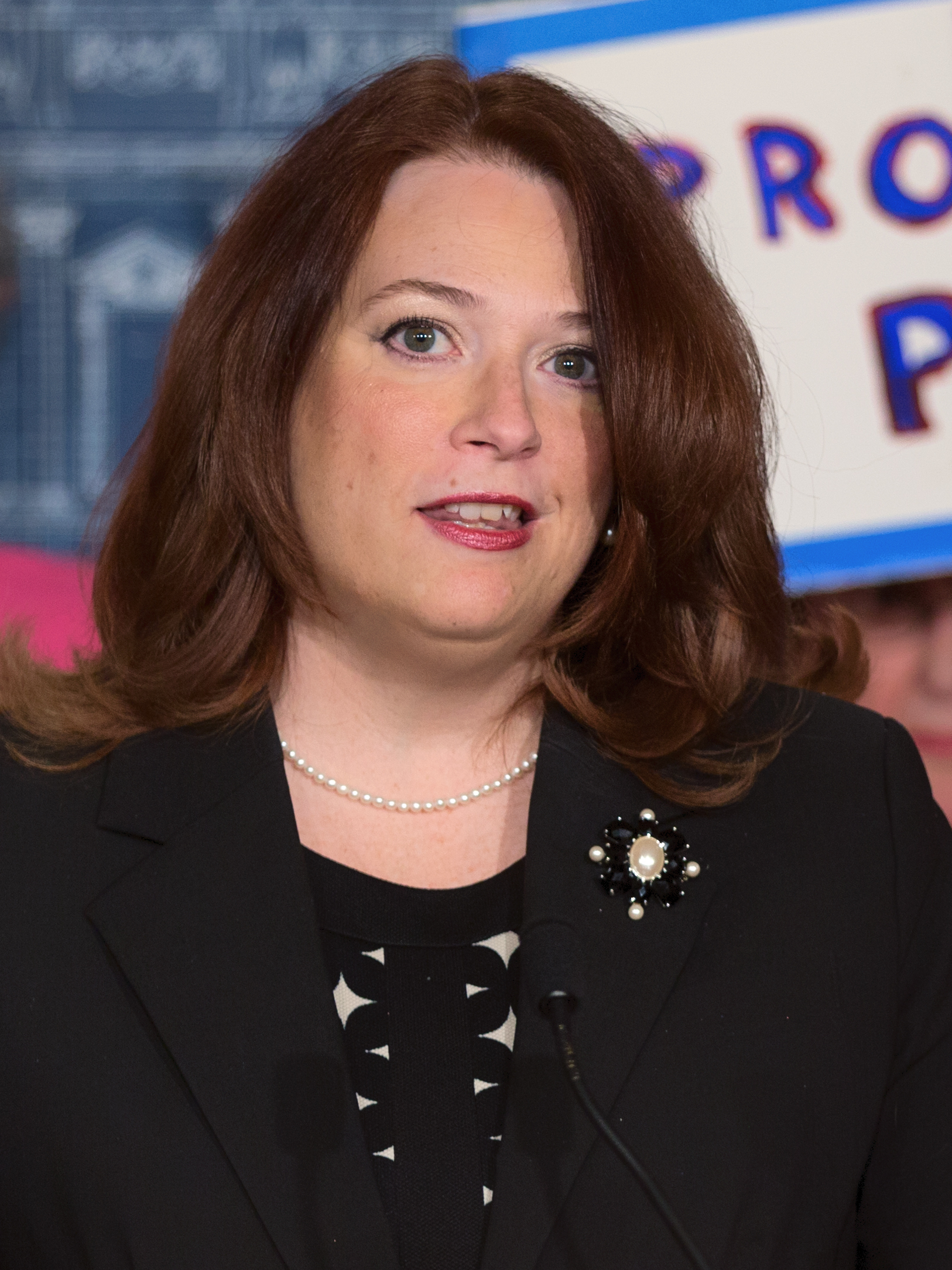

Speaker pro tempore of the Minnesota House of Representatives
- In office January 8, 2019 – January 5, 2021
- Preceded by: Tony Albright
- Succeeded by: Liz Olson

Member of the Minnesota House of Representatives from the 51B district
- In office January 8, 2013 – January 5, 2021
- Preceded by: Redistricted
- Succeeded by: Liz Reyer

Personal details
- Born: February 8, 1969 (age 57)
- Party: Democratic
- Spouse: Jason
- Children: 1
- Relatives: Howard I. Nelson (grandfather); Peter C. Nelson (uncle)
- Education: St. Catherine University (BS); University of Minnesota

Laurie Halverson (born February 8, 1969) is an American politician who serves as County Commissioner for Dakota County in Minnesota. Previously, she has served as a member of the Minnesota House of Representatives from 2013 to 2021. A member of the Minnesota Democratic–Farmer–Labor Party (DFL), she represented District 51B in the southern Twin Cities metropolitan area.

== Education ==
Halverson attended the College of St. Catherine, graduating in 2001 with a Bachelor of Science in political science. She later attended the Hubert H. Humphrey School of Public Affairs at the University of Minnesota.

== Career ==
Halverson was first elected to the Minnesota House of Representatives in 2012. She won reelection against Republican Pat Hammond in 2016.

She supported the bill legalizing same-sex marriage in Minnesota.

== Personal life ==
Halverson and her husband, Jason, have one child and reside in Eagan, Minnesota. Her grandfather, Howard I. Nelson, and her uncle, Peter C. Nelson, also served in the Minnesota Legislature.

Minnesota House of Representatives
| Preceded by Tony Albright | Speaker pro tempore of the Minnesota House of Representatives; 2019–2021 | Succeeded by Liz Olson |
