= Howard I. Nelson =

American businessman and politician (1912–2008)

Howard I. Nelson (November 25, 1912 – March 31, 2008) was an American businessman and politician.

Born in Milltown, Wisconsin, Nelson went to Milltown High School. He owned a meat market and frozen food locker in Lindstrom, Minnesota. Nelson served on the Lindstrom City Council and was mayor. In 1959 and 1960, Nelson served in the Minnesota House of Representatives and then served in the Minnesota State Senate from 1963 to 1971 and was a Republican. His son Peter C. Nelson and his granddaughter Laurie Halverson also served in the Minnesota Legislator. Nelson died in Chisago City, Minnesota.
