= Jennifer Carnahan =

American politician (born 1976)

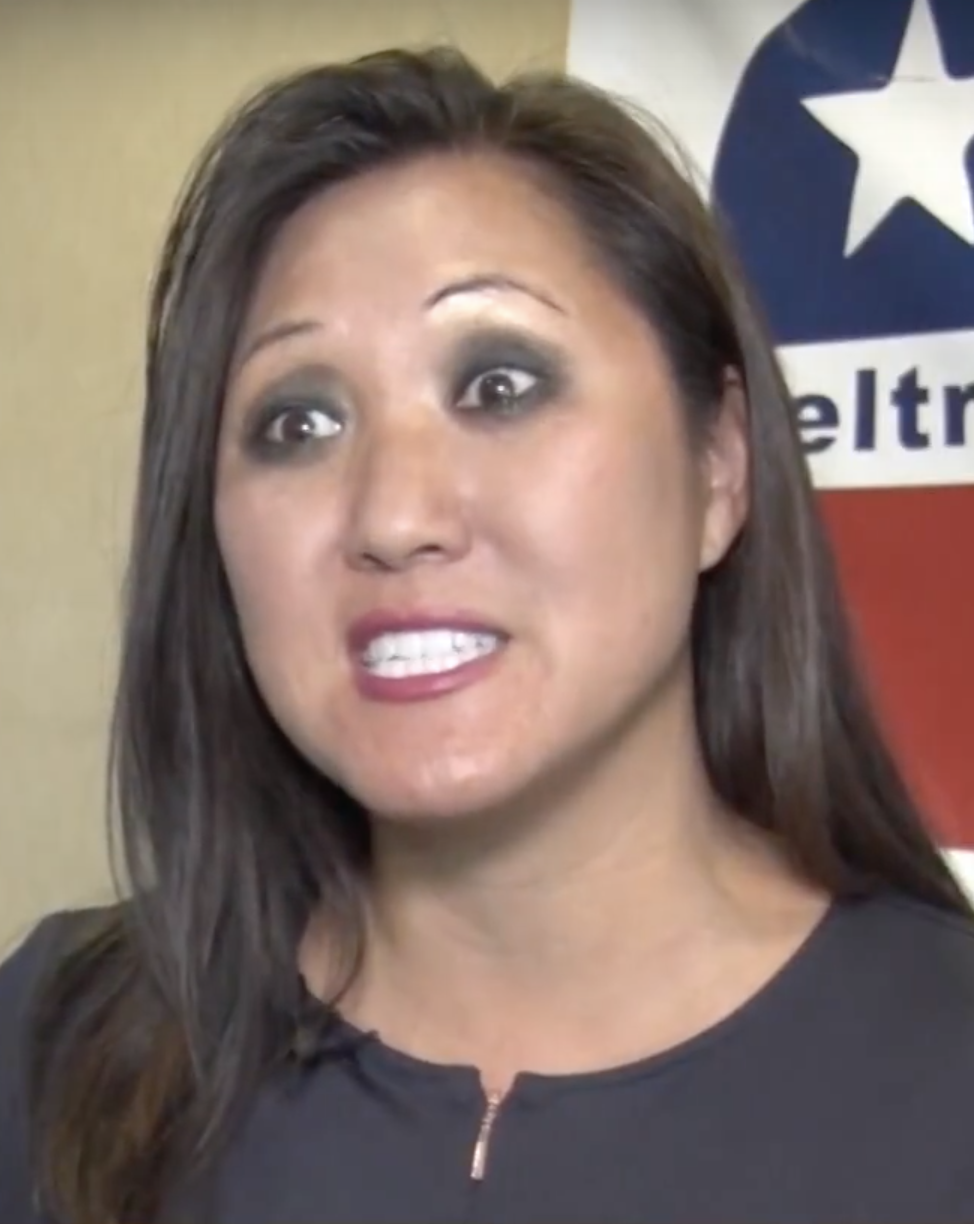
- Carnahan in 2018

Mayor of Nisswa, Minnesota
- Incumbent
- Assumed office January 1, 2025
- Preceded by: John Ryan

Chair of the Minnesota Republican Party
- In office May 1, 2017 – August 19, 2021
- Preceded by: Keith Downey
- Succeeded by: David Hann

Personal details
- Born: 1976 (age 49–50) South Korea
- Party: Republican
- Spouse: Jim Hagedorn (m. 2018; died 2022)
- Education: Syracuse University (BS); University of Minnesota (MBA)

Jennifer Carnahan (born 1976) is an American politician who served as the chair of the Republican Party of Minnesota from 2017 to 2021. On March 14, 2022, she declared her candidacy for a special election in Minnesota's 1st congressional district. She finished third in the Republican primary with 8% of the vote.

== Early life and education ==
Carnahan was left on the back doorstep of a rural hospital in South Korea. She was adopted by an American and grew up in the Minneapolis–Saint Paul metropolitan area. She graduated from Osseo Senior High School in 1995.

Carnahan earned her Bachelor of Science degree in 1999 from the S. I. Newhouse School of Public Communications at Syracuse University, where she majored in broadcast journalism. She earned her Master of Business Administration from the Carlson School of Management at the University of Minnesota in 2010.

== Career ==
Carnahan began her career working with private businesses on branding, including McDonald's, General Mills, and Ecolab. At Ecolab, she founded the Ecolab Asian Employee network. She received the General Manager's Award in 2011 and 2012.

Carnahan was elected as a national delegate to the 2016 Republican National Convention in Cleveland, Ohio. In 2016, she was a Republican candidate for the 59th district in the Minnesota Senate, but lost to incumbent Democrat Bobby Joe Champion.

=== Minnesota Republican Party ===
Carnahan was elected as chair of the Republican Party of Minnesota in 2017. Under the motto "Make Minnesota Red 2018", the party hoped to carry the momentum of Trump almost winning Minnesota in 2016, but did not do well in the 2018 elections. After the 2020 elections, Carnahan alleged that the election results showed "extreme abnormalities and statistical variations from Minnesota's historic voter trends". A Minnesota Public Radio reporter's analysis of the data did not support her opinion.

In January 2017, during her first race for chair, Carnahan said: "I don't feel it's a one-size-fits-all approach. What resonates with voters in different parts of Minnesota may be different even though we have the same set of values. We can't keep putting up the same white 60-year-old guy to speak about our values. If they say that's identity politics then that's too bad."

In June 2018, Carnahan said she had faced racist remarks from members of both the Democratic and Republican parties. She was criticized after she received a merit bonus based on her performance as a fundraiser. The party executive director, Matthew Pagano, said: "It's merit-based, based on performance. It's not like a flat salary, which has been a lot larger at a flat rate for prior chairs. The incentive is meant to recognize the extra work involved in securing those large donations, which is the primary duty of any party chair."

==== Reelection ====
On April 10, 2021, Carnahan was reelected as chair of the Republican Party of Minnesota, defeating State Senator Mark Koran with 67% of the vote. During her reelection campaign, she touted the party's success in winning Minnesota's 1st and 8th districts in 2018 and the 7th district in 2020. During the campaign, Koran alleged that the staff of the Minnesota Republican Party seized undue control of the party convention process at the local level to tilt the scales in Carnahan's favor.

==== Resignation ====
Anton Lazzaro, a prominent Republican political operative and fundraiser, led a team that helped Carnahan campaign for state party chair starting in 2017. He and Carnahan co-hosted the Minnesota Republican Party podcast Truth Matters. In August 2021, a federal grand jury indicted Lazzaro on child sex trafficking charges. Before his indictment, Carnahan called him "one of the biggest advocates and champions in the Republican Party of Minnesota".

In a statement released to the media after Lazzaro's indictment, Carnahan condemned his alleged actions and pledged to donate funds received from him to charity. Carnahan resigned as party chair on August 19, 2021.

=== 2022 congressional special election ===
On March 16, 2022, after the death of her husband, U.S. Representative Jim Hagedorn, Carnahan announced her candidacy in the special election to fill his seat in Minnesota's 1st congressional district. She said, "In the final weeks before his passing, Jim told me to keep forging ahead, to keep reaching my dreams, and to win this seat. [...] Jim was my best friend and the love of my life, and it is his blessing that strengthens me for the challenges ahead. I am committed to continuing my husband's legacy of fighting to secure the border, defending conservative values, safeguarding the integrity of our elections, and serving the people of Minnesota's First Congressional District." Carnahan came in third in the Republican primary, receiving 2,887 votes (8.0%). Brad Finstad won the primary with 13,695 votes (38.1%).

=== Mayor of Nisswa ===
In August 2024, Carnahan announced her candidacy for mayor of Nisswa, Minnesota. On November 5, she was elected to that office with 54.2% of the vote.

In late 2025, the Nisswa city council asked Carnahan to resign based on her conduct in a dispute with a resident whom she has accused of physically assaulting her. The resident has denied the allegations and prosecutors have twice declined to press charges. After Carnahan refused to resign, the council passed vote of no confidence in January 2026 and removed her from city committees. She remains acting mayor and intends to complete her term.

== Personal life ==
Carnahan served on the board of directors for Big Brothers Big Sisters of the Twin Cities and owned a women's specialty boutique. She is a former board member of the Minnesota chapter of the National Association of Asian MBAs, where she led initiatives to support the advancement, development, progression, and advancement of Asian Americans in the corporate world.

In 2020, Carnahan was criticized after a staffer in Hagedorn's Washington office emailed a National Park Service official at Carnahan's request to ask for free entrance and private guided tours for Carnahan at several Arizona parks.

Party political offices
Preceded by Keith Downey	Chair of the Minnesota Republican Party; 2017–2021	Succeeded by Carleton Crawford; Acting
