= Sandra Masin =

American politician

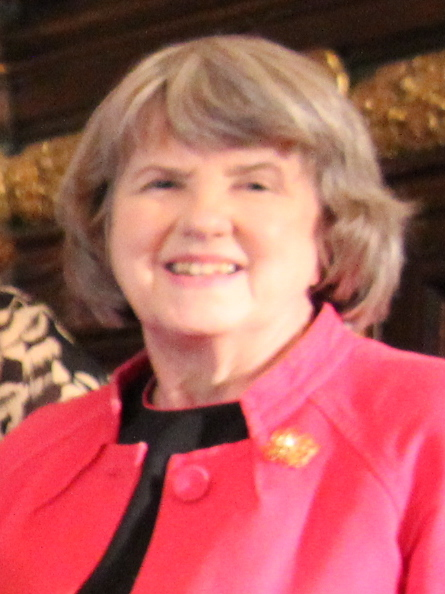

Member of the Minnesota House of Representatives from the 51A district
- Incumbent
- Assumed office January 8, 2013
- Preceded by: redrawn district

Member of the Minnesota House of Representatives from the 38A district
- In office January 3, 2007 – January 3, 2011
- Preceded by: Tim Wilkin
- Succeeded by: Diane Anderson

Personal details
- Born: November 8, 1942 (age 83) Cleveland, Ohio
- Party: Minnesota Democratic–Farmer–Labor Party
- Children: 3
- Education: Valparaiso University
- Occupation: Financial services, real estate, insurance agent, legislator

Sandra A. Masin (born November 8, 1942) is a Minnesota politician and member of the Minnesota House of Representatives. A member of the Minnesota Democratic–Farmer–Labor Party (DFL), she represents District 51A, which includes portions of the city of Eagan in Dakota County, which is in the southeastern part of the Twin Cities metropolitan area. She is also a business woman, working in financial services, real estate sales and insurance.

== Early life, education, and career ==
Masin graduated from Maple Heights High School in Maple Heights, Ohio then went on to Valparaiso University in Valparaiso, Indiana, where she majored in Government and minored in Economics, earning a B.A. in 1964. Prior to her current work in business, she was a tour guide for the Minnesota Historical Society at the Minnesota Capitol building for nine years and was moderator of "Legislative Update," a Burnsville-Eagan Public-access television show, from 1988 to 1996, was a staff member for the Minnesota House of Representatives from 1990 to 1991 and was volunteer coordinator at the Shakopee Women's Correctional Facility in Shakopee for the Minnesota Department of Corrections from 1991 to 1995.

== Minnesota House of Representatives ==
Masin was first elected in 2006 and was re-elected in 2008. She was unseated by Republican Diane Anderson in her 2010 re-election bid. She ran again and was elected in 2012, 2014, and 2016.

During her first two terms, she was a member of the House Public Safety Policy and Oversight Committee, and also served as vice chair of the Commerce and Labor Subcommittee for the Telecommunications Regulation and Infrastructure Division, and as a member of the Finance subcommittees for the State Government Finance Division, the Transportation and Transit Policy and Oversight Division, and the Transportation Finance and Policy Division.

== Involvement in community and government ==
Active in her community and in local government through the years, Masin was a member of the Eagan City Parks Commission from 1981 to 1989, was a member of the board of commissioners of the Minnesota Valley Transit Authority from 1993 to 1999, serving as vice chair in 1994, was a member of the Transportation Committee of the Association of Metropolitan Municipalities in 1993, was a representative to Independent School District 191 and is a member of the Minnesota Women's Political Caucus. She has been a board member of the National Association of Insurance and Financial Advisors since 1995, was a member of the Transportation Policy Committee of the National League of Cities from 1999 to 2000, a member of the Center for Transportation Studies Advisory Committee at the University of Minnesota from 1994 to 2000, and a member and former chair of the Suburban Transit Association. She has also served on the Burnsville-Eagan-Savage School District's Community Education Advisory Council, the Dakota Council for Health Communities, the Dakota County League of Governments, the Legislative Advisory Committee of the League of Minnesota Cities, the Dakota County Agricultural Society Board and the local League of Women Voters.
