= Ron Carey (Minnesota politician) =

American politician

Chair of the Republican Party of Minnesota
- In office June 11, 2005 – July 1, 2009
- Preceded by: Ron Eibensteiner
- Succeeded by: Tony Sutton

Personal details
- Born: Iowa, U.S.
- Party: Republican
- Education: University of Northwestern – St. Paul (BS)

Ron Carey is an American politician advisor who worked as chairman of the Republican Party of Minnesota from June 11, 2005, until July 1, 2009.

== Early life and education ==
Carey is a native of Iowa. He earned a Bachelor of Science degree in business administration from the University of Northwestern – St. Paul.

== Career ==
Carey served as chief of staff for Congresswoman Michele Bachmann. He was first elected chair of the Minnesota Republican Party by the party's central committee on June 11, 2005, succeeding Ron Eibensteiner. He was re-elected on the first ballot in June 2007. Prior to serving as chair, he was the state party's treasurer. During the 2008 Republican Party presidential primaries, Carey endorsed Arkansas Governor Mike Huckabee. He supported Donald Trump in the 2016 United States presidential election.
