= Pat Shortridge =

Republican lobbyist in the United States

Chair of the Republican Party of Minnesota
- In office December 31, 2011 – April 6, 2013
- Preceded by: Tony Sutton
- Succeeded by: Keith Downey

Personal details
- Born: Winona, Minnesota
- Party: Republican Party of Minnesota
- Education: Macalester College
- Occupation: lobbyist

Pat Shortridge is a Minnesota lobbyist, former Chair of the Republican Party of Minnesota and founder of Conservative Solutions Project.

== Early life and education ==
Shortridge was born in Winona, Minnesota. He attended Macalester College.

== Political career ==
After graduating from Macalester College, Shortridge became an intern, then paid staffer, of Texas Representative Dick Armey, eventually working for him for eleven years. He left Armey's employment in 2001 to become a lobbyist for Enron, a position he held for approximately six months before the company went into bankruptcy as a result of the Enron scandal.

After the brief position at Enron, Shortridge returned to Minnesota to work for Representative Mark Kennedy for five years. He ran Kennedy's campaign in the 2006 senate election, which Kennedy lost by over 20 percentage points to DFL candidate Amy Klobuchar.

In 2011, Minnesota Republican chairman Tony Sutton abruptly departed among controversy. Shortridge was elected by 350 party delegates at a meeting on December 31 in St. Cloud, Minnesota over two other candidates. The Republican Party of Minnesota faced a debt of over $2 million at the time of Shortridge's election, which he managed to reduce significantly during his first year as chairman. He insisted that he would only serve out the remainder of Sutton's term expiring April 6, 2013, when party delegates would select a new chair. He was succeeded by Keith Downey.

== Personal life ==
Shortridge resides in Lino Lakes, Minnesota.
