= Tony Sutton =

American politician (born 1967)

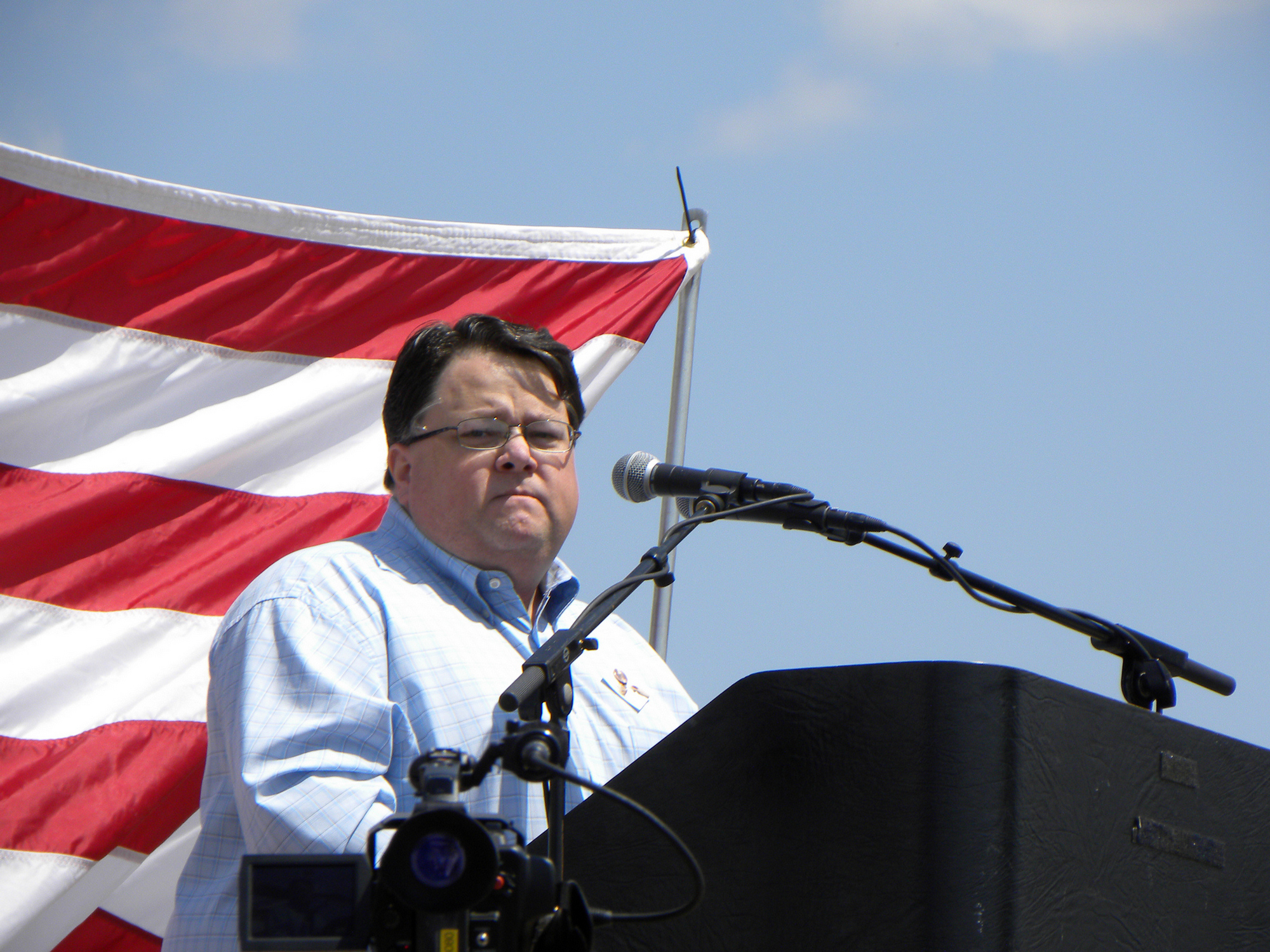
- Sutton speaking at the 2011 Tax Cut Rally

Chair of the Republican Party of Minnesota
- In office June 11, 2009 – December 2, 2011
- Preceded by: Ron Carey
- Succeeded by: Pat Shortridge

Personal details
- Born: September 1967 (age 59) Saint Paul, Minnesota
- Spouse: Bridget Cronin (2002-2013)
- Education: Hibbing High School Metropolitan State University Norwich University
- Occupation: Political activist, business executive

Anthony G. "Tony" Sutton (born September 1967) is the former chairman of the Republican Party of Minnesota and founder of a political public relations firm, Winning Strategies.

== Biography ==
Sutton was born in Saint Paul, and graduated from Hibbing High School in Hibbing. He and his late ex-wife, Bridget Cronin, have three biological children; Margaret, Olivia, and Molly, and one adopted son Kieran Cronin. Sutton lives in Inver Grove Heights, a southeastern suburb in the Twin Cities metropolitan area.

Sutton has served as the chairman of the Republican Party of Minnesota since July 1, 2009, when he succeeded Ron Carey in the role. Tony Sutton was found guilty of circumventing Finance Laws by the Minnesota Campaign Finance Board which imposed $33,000 in fines against him and the fund he created to help with the Gubernatorial Election Recount of 2010. Amid mounting evidence of party financial disarray, Sutton announced his resignation effective at 5pm, Friday, December 2, 2011 on Twitter at 4:45 pm that day.

Sutton has served on numerous campaigns and committees on both the local and national level, including working as Executive Director of the Republican Party of Minnesota. He served as Secretary-Treasurer of the party from 2005-2009. In January 2011, Sutton stepped down from his role at the CEO of Baja Sol Restaurant Group to found Winning Strategies.

Sutton was a board member of CAGE, Citizens Against Gambling Expansion, a group funded in part by American Indian casino operators opposed to gambling expansion. In May 2011 he came under investigation by the Minnesota Republican Party, requesting that he explain how GOP activists on a closely held party database began receiving e-mails from CAGE. On May 14, 2011, he resigned from CAGE.

In September 2013, Sutton and his wife - who he has since divorced - filed for Chapter 7 bankruptcy, citing $2.1 million in personal debts.
