= Ron Erhardt (politician) =

American politician (born 1929)

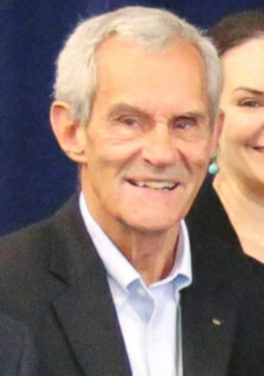

Member of the Minnesota House of Representatives from the 49A district 42B (1991–1993), 42A (1993–2003), 41A (2003–2009)
- In office January 8, 2013 – January 3, 2017
- Preceded by: Keith Downey
- Succeeded by: Dario Anselmo
- In office January 8, 1991 – January 6, 2009
- Preceded by: Mary Forsythe
- Succeeded by: Keith Downey

Personal details
- Born: October 23, 1929 (age 97) Minnesota
- Party: Democratic-Farmer-Labor (2010–present); Republican Party (until 2008)
- Spouse: Jackie (until 2001, her death)
- Education: University of Minnesota
- Occupation: financial planner

Ron Erhardt (born October 23, 1929) is a politician from the U.S. state of Minnesota and former member of the Minnesota House of Representatives. He represented District 49A, which included most of Edina in Hennepin County.

Erhardt is a member of the Minnesota Democratic–Farmer–Labor Party (DFL) and was re-endorsed by the DFL for re-election in 2016. Until July 2008, Erhardt was a Republican and was endorsed by the Republican Party of Minnesota. For nine successive terms, he earned election victories, even when other Republicans did poorly. In 2006, he won with 59.5%. However, over time his district, then numbered District 41A, went from Republican-leaning to becoming more of a swing district, with candidates of both major parties succeeding in the same elections. Illustrated by the district supporting Democrats John Kerry in the 2004 election and Amy Klobuchar for US Senate in 2006 while at the same time voting strongly for Republicans such as then Congressman Jim Ramstad and the current Congressman Erik Paulsen, as well as State Representative Ron Erhardt, who won as an endorsed Republican in those same 2004 and 2006 elections with a 60% plurality.

In the 2016 election, Erhardt was defeated by Republican Dario Anselmo.

== Personal history ==
Raised in Minneapolis, Erhardt graduated from Minneapolis North Community High School. He fought in the Korean War becoming a decorated combat veteran. Erhardt was awarded the Korean Medal of Honor. On return from Korea, Erhardt enrolled in the University of Minnesota graduating with a BA in Psychology and a BBA in Business. Living in Edina, Minnesota, the last 41 years, Erhardt was a Financial Planner for 37 years.

== Community involvement ==
Erhardt's long community involvement includes: twice appointed by the state to Legislative-Citizen Commission on Minnesota Resources (LCCMR), Edina Community Foundation, Westminster Presbyterian Church, Past Member of the Edina Human Rights Commission, National Association of Insurance and Financial Advisors, Society of Financial Service Professionals, Citizens League, Sierra Club, Ducks Unlimited, University of Minnesota College of Liberal Arts Alumni society; Past member, and Edina Rotary.

== Leadership ==
Served in the House from 1990 to 2008; 2012–2016, Chair; Transportation and Property Tax Committees, Served 16 years on the Taxes Committee, Past Chair; Edina Chamber of Commerce Government Relations Committee, Board of Directors; Minnesota Lakes and Rivers Advocates, and Southdale YMCA Board of Management.

== Political career ==
Prior to 2010, Erhardt was a long time Republican, known as a fiscal conservative and a social moderate, basing his positions and votes on the predominant views of the voters of his district. Well known for knocking on most doors in his district every election cycle and running a legislative poll of his constituents on major issues, he sent an annual report of issues to every household. He received many awards from a wide variety of organizations in recognition of his many years of service. His primary area of legislative work recently was in transportation. Additionally, he co-authored bills in many other areas. Previously, Erhardt served on the House Committees for Transportation Policy (Vice-Chairman), Taxes- where he, as ranking minority member, authored a major revision of Minnesota Real Property Taxes, Transportation Finance, as well as long time service on the Ways and Means Committee.

Erhardt, first elected to the State House in 1990 as a Republican, was re-elected eight times and served nine consecutive terms in the House of Representatives (1991-2009). During the Republican Party endorsement process in 2008, a conservative Republican obtained the Republican Party's endorsement, Keith Downey. Erhardt then entered the general election race as a Moderate Independent. Local conservative Republicans were upset with Erhardt's leadership of the over-ride of Governor Pawlenty's veto of the Transportation bill, and with his views on abortion and gay rights.

In February 2008, Erhardt was in the news when he and five other Republicans in the House voted with House Democrats for a successful override of Governor Tim Pawlenty's veto of a statewide transportation bill. Since 1939 only 14 vetoes have been overridden (of which 12 fall into the tenure of Independence Party Governor Jesse Ventura). Erhardt had been instrumental in the drafting of this bill which included a graduated increase in the gas tax dedicated to highway and bridge repair and construction. It also gave metro counties the option of increasing by 0.15% the sales tax to fund transit projects, an option later approved in 5 of the 7 metro area counties. The legislature's veto override vote was the first successful veto override of Pawlenty's administration. Supporters of the bill, including the Minnesota Chamber of Commerce and the Minnesota Transportation Alliance, argued that an increase in funding was needed for highways and transit, especially after the nationally mourned Highway 35W bridge collapse. The flat gas tax had not been increased since 1988. Critics of the bill, including Governor Pawlenty, opposed any tax increase and also opposed investment in mass transit. Erhardt explained his vote to override the veto by pointing out that 61% of his constituents in Edina supported the bill.

== Electoral history since 2008 ==
=== 2008 ===
In 2008 endorsement process, Erhardt was denied the Republican endorsement after 18 years in the house as a Republican representative. There was no primary because Erhardt did not challenge the endorsed Republican candidate, Keith Downey. Instead, Erhardt competed in a three way race in the general election, running as a moderate independent, without party affiliation, stating he would caucus with the majority, if elected.

Erhardt came in second in the three way race, as each of the three candidates received about one-third of the vote. Staunton and Erhardt split the moderate vote, giving conservative Republican Downey a narrow victory with 37% of votes cast. Political columnist Lori Sturdevant's post election analysis in the Star Tribune hypothesized that if it been a two way race, either Ron Erhardt or Kevin Staunton would have easily beaten Keith Downey, based on the turnout.

=== 2010 ===
In 2010, Ron Erhardt sought, but did not receive, the DFL endorsement for the state house. As part of the endorsement process, Erhardt agreed to abide by the party endorsement. Kevin Staunton was the endorsed DFL candidate and ran in a two way race losing to then incumbent Republican Keith Downey.

=== 2012 ===
In 2012, Ron Erhardt sought and received the DFL endorsement for the state house. Erhardt defeated his Republican opponent, Bill Glahn, by a 12 percent margin in the November 2012 general election. At the state legislature, Erhardt was named Chair of the House Transportation Committee.

=== 2014 ===
Edina's Representative Ron Erhardt ran for re-election in the November 2014 general election and was endorsed by Conservation Minnesota, The Sierra Club, Minnesota Association of Professional Employees, Minnesota Professional Firefighters, Minnesota Nurses Association, Minnesota Medical Association, Education Minnesota, DFL, Planned Parenthood of MN, SD, & ND, NARAL ProChoice Minnesota, Minnesota Police and Peace Officers Association. He defeated Republican challenger Dario Anselmo.

=== 2016 ===
Erhardt ran for re-election in 2016. He was defeated by Republican challenger Dario Anselmo, with Anselmo garnering 51.1% of the vote to Erhardt's 48.9%, a difference of 576 votes.
