= Minneapolis College =

Community college in Minneapolis, Minnesota, U.S.

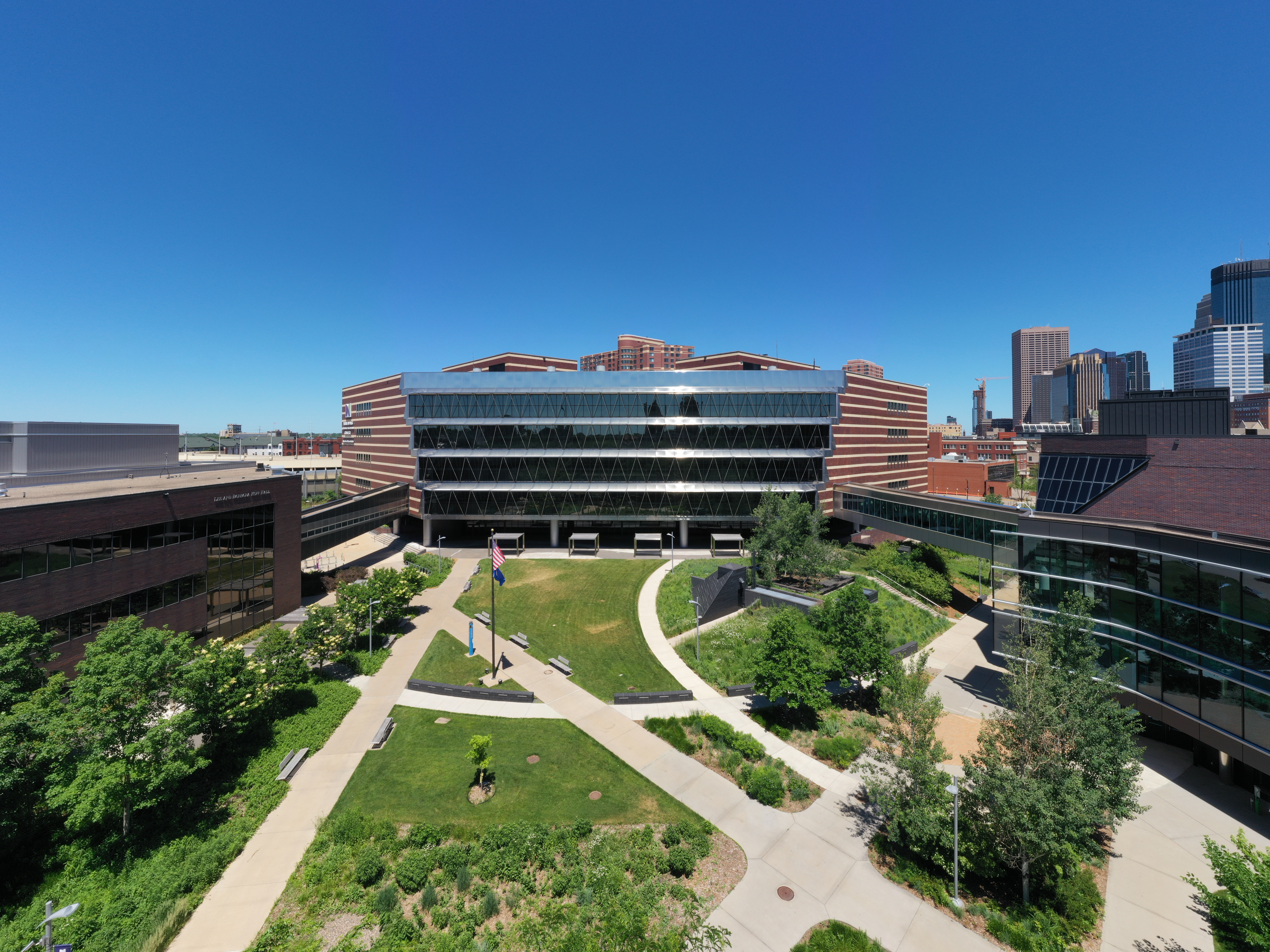
- Type: Public community college
- Established: 1996 (merger)
- Affiliations: MnSCU System
- Chancellor: Scott Olson
- President: Sharon Pierce
- Students: 11,110 (2017)
- Location: 1501 Hennepin Avenue, Minneapolis, Minnesota, United States; 44.97280°N 93.28337°W
- Campus: Urban, 418,000 sq ft (38,800 m^{2})
- Colors: Inspired Violet Cyber Grape Park Meadow
- Nickname: MCTC
- Website: www.minneapolis.edu
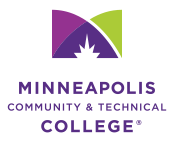

Minneapolis College (formerly Minneapolis Community and Technical College) is a public community college in Minneapolis, Minnesota. It has one of the most diverse student populations in the state and enrolls nearly 11,100 credit students annually. Minneapolis College is part of Minnesota State, which offers two-year associate degrees, certificates, and diplomas.

== History ==
Minneapolis College was founded as the Girls Vocational School in 1914 by its first principal, Miss Elizabeth Fish. When a new building at 1101 Third Avenue South was completed in 1932 it was renamed Mary Miller Vocational School, after the teacher credited with opening the first school in Minneapolis in 1852.

In the 1960s the name changed to Minneapolis Area Vocational Technical Institute. The school became Minneapolis Community College in 1965, and was the as the first campus of Metropolitan State Junior College.

The name changed again to Metropolitan Community College in 1974. In 1979, the metropolitan system was broken up and the Minneapolis campus became Minneapolis Community College.

The school entered the 1980s as Minneapolis Technical Institute on a new 418,000-square-foot (38,800 m^{2}) campus at 1415 Hennepin Avenue. Its name was change was to Minneapolis Technical College (MTC).

Minneapolis Community and Technical College (MCTC) was formed in February 1996 by the merger of Minneapolis Technical College and Minneapolis Community College following the July 1995 creation of MnSCU. They had shared the same campus adjacent to Loring Park for many years.

In 2003, Minneapolis Community and Technical College acquired adjacent land that previously belonged to the Billy Graham Evangelistic Association's Minneapolis headquarters.

In 2004, Metropolitan State University (Metro State) and MCTC started sharing programs and Metro State's Minneapolis campus moved to the newly expanded MCTC campus from its original location a few blocks away. In fall 2008, the college opened a new Management Education Center and Science building on this property. By 2010, the only Metro State programs still operating on campus were theatre arts and business.

In 2022, the name was shortened to Minneapolis College.

== Buildings ==
Minneapolis College is made up of 11 buildings and a parking ramp. Each building houses many student services.

- Technical Building – The T Building's first floor houses the cafeteria and bookstore. On the second floor are financial aid, advising and counseling, business services, the testing center, Public Safety, the mail room / E Store, and a coffee shop. The third floor has a computer lab, an IT service desk, and the Academic Resource Center.
- Helland Center – The Helland Center is home to the Student Life Center. On the first floor are tables and chairs, a convenience store, and service desk. On the second floor are the Student Life information desk, the Student Senate, and the college newspaper. On the third floor are the Student Health Center and student lockers.
- Irene H. Whitney Fine Arts Center – The Fine Arts Center at Minneapolis College houses a performance hall, classrooms, exhibition space, and offices.
- Whitney Hall – Wheelock Whitney Hall's first floor is home to the Minneapolis College Library. The second floor has a lounge area, and the third floor has classrooms.
- Bowman Hall – The first floor of Bowman Hall has the Human Services Department, the gymnasium, dance room, weight room, and equipment room. The second floor is home to the president's office, the Reading Department, and the Communications Department.
- Kopp Hall – Kopp hall houses Human Resources and classrooms.
- Ackerberg Science Center – The Science Center is home to science labs, classrooms and the Science Department offices.
- Management Education Center and Center of Safety Training – The Management Education Center houses the Continuing Education and Business Departments. The Safety Training Center is home to Custom Training programs.
- The College Foundation and the Wells Family College Center are the other buildings on campus.

== Academics ==
Minneapolis College offers more than 100 career and occupational programs in aviation, business, education, health, information technology, justice system, manufacturing and construction, media arts, public service, and the service industry. The college also has many clubs and societies, including a school newspaper. Minneapolis College has an Aviation Technician program at Minneapolis–Saint Paul International Airport, a Center for Criminal Justice in Saint Paul, and a Health Careers Institute in Minneapolis's Phillips neighborhood.

Minneapolis College competed with other community colleges in men's and women's basketball as the Mavericks. In 2009, at the end of a 33–2 season, the men's team lost to Richland College 58–57 in the NJCAA Division III National Championship. The school discontinued the basketball programs after the 2009–10 season.
