= Minnesota's 51A House of Representatives district =

American legislative district

Minnesota's 51A State House of Representatives district
Representative
Michael Howard; DFL–Richfield
since 2019
- Population (2020): 42,586

District 51A is a district in the Minnesota House of Representatives covering Richfield, Minnesota, MSP, and a small part of southern Minneapolis. It has been represented by Michael Howard since 2019.

== List of representatives ==
Member	Party	Residence	Term
Michael Howard	DFL	Richfield	2019-
Sandra Masin	DFL	Eagan	2013-2019
