= 2020 Bloomington, Minnesota ballot questions =

- November 3, 2020

Three ballot questions were presented before voters in Bloomington, Minnesota on November 3, 2020. The first two ballot questions were related to the organized collection of solid waste, while the third was a question on the implementation of ranked-choice voting in city elections.

== Ballot questions ==
=== Question 1 ===
Should the Bloomington City Charter be amended to add: “ Unless first approved by a majority of voters in a state general election, the City shall not replace the competitive market in solid waste collection with a system in which solid waste services are provided by government- chosen collectors or in government designed districts. The adoption of this Charter amendment shall supersede any ordinances, ordinance amendments, or charter amendments related to solid waste adopted by the City Council in 2015-2016.”?

==== Results ====
Question One
	Votes	%
Yes	26,732	54.4%
No	22,404	45.6%
Total Ballots Cast	49,136	100.00%
Source: City of Bloomington

=== Question 2 ===
If City Question 1 above passes, should the Bloomington City Charter also be amended to add: The council shall not enter into a contract with residential solid waste haulers for the exclusive rights to haul and collect residential solid waste services within the jurisdictional boundaries of the City of Bloomington”? A “yes” vote means you do not approve of continuing city organized trash, recyclables, yard waste, bulky waste, and electronic waste collection. A “no” vote means you approve of continuing with city-organized trash, recyclables, yard waste, bulky waste, and electronic waste collection.

==== Results ====
Question Two
	Votes	%
No	35,188	70.8%
Yes	14,487	29.2%
Total Ballots Cast	49,675	100.00%
Source: City of Bloomington

=== Question 3 ===
Should the Bloomington City Charter be amended to elect the Mayor and City Council members by the Ranked Choice Voting method?

==== Results ====
Question Three
	Votes	%
Yes	25,339	51.2%
No	24,158	48.8%
Total Ballots Cast	49,497	100.00%
Source: City of Bloomington
