= Connie Bernardy =

American politician (born 1963)

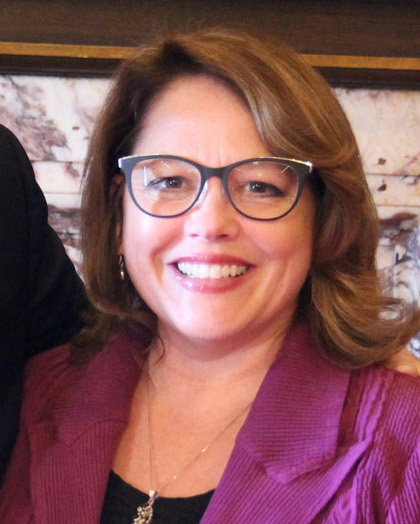

Member of the Minnesota House of Representatives
- In office January 8, 2013 – January 2023
- Preceded by: Keith Downey
- Constituency: District 41A

Member of the Minnesota House of Representatives District 51B
- In office January 7, 2003 – September 4, 2006
- Preceded by: Alice Johnson
- Succeeded by: Tom Tillberry
- In office January 3, 2001 – January 7, 2003
- Constituency: District 48B

Personal details
- Born: February 26, 1963 (age 63) Anoka County, Minnesota
- Party: Minnesota Democratic–Farmer–Labor Party
- Spouse: Dan
- Children: 3
- Education: Anoka-Ramsey Community College; University of Minnesota (B.A.); University of St. Thomas
- Occupation: legislator

Connie Bernardy (born February 26, 1963) is a Minnesota politician and former member of the Minnesota House of Representatives. A member of the Minnesota Democratic–Farmer–Labor Party (DFL), she represented District 41A in the north-central Twin Cities metropolitan area.

== Education ==
Bernardy graduated from Spring Lake Park High School. She attended Anoka-Ramsey Community College. She later attended the University of Minnesota, graduating with a B.A. in communication studies, and also the University of St. Thomas, graduating with an M.B.A. certification in government acquisitions and contract management.

== Minnesota House of Representatives ==
Bernardy was first elected to the Minnesota House of Representatives in 2000. She served until she resigned on September 4, 2006 in order to work for Education Minnesota as a lobbyist. She was elected to the House again in 2012, serving until 2022.

== Personal life ==
Bernardy is married to her husband, Dan. They have three children and reside in New Brighton, Minnesota.
