= Richard H. Jefferson =

American politician (1931–2021)

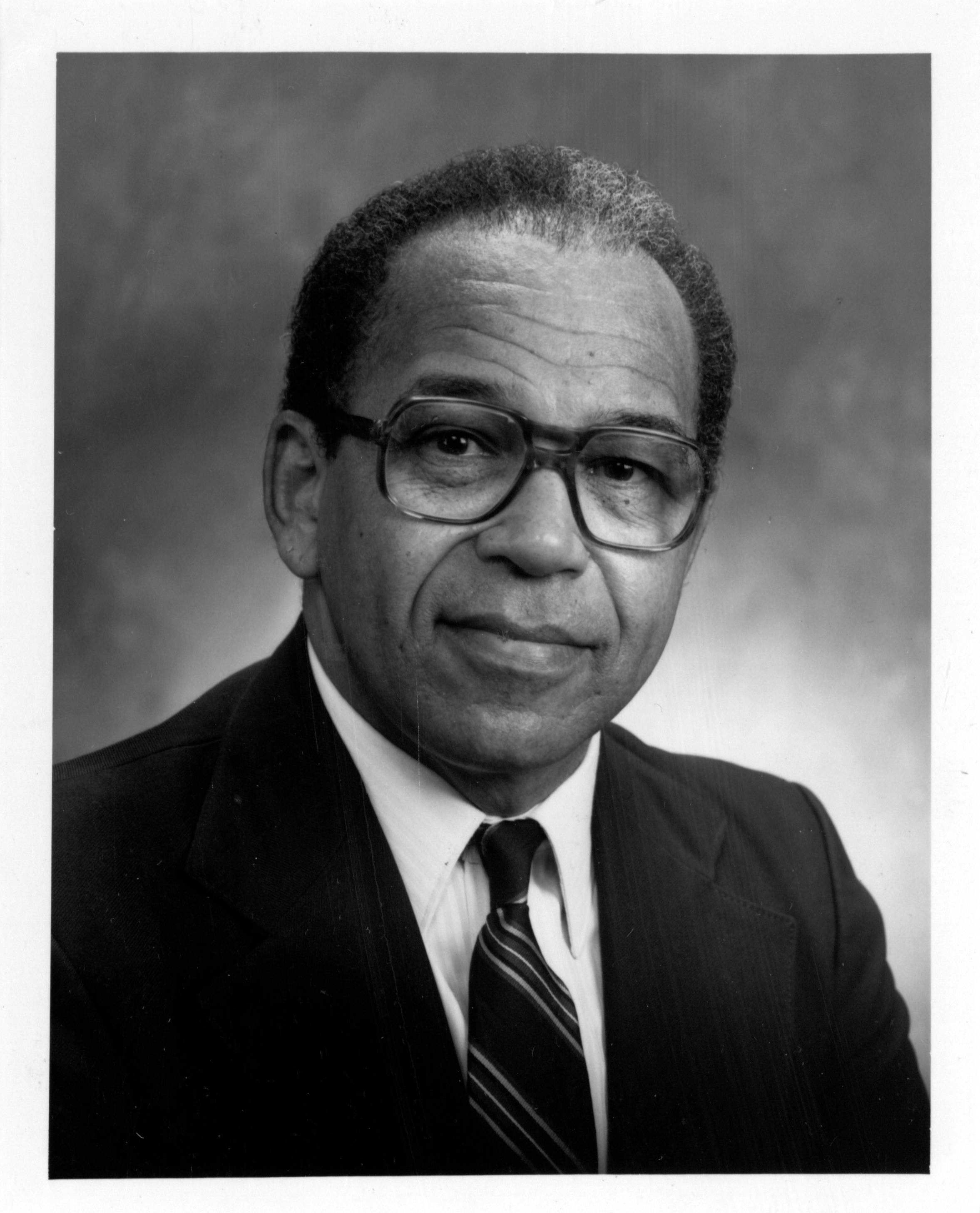

Member of the Minnesota House of Representatives from district 58B
- In office January 5, 1993 – January 4, 1999
- Preceded by: Phyllis Kahn
- Succeeded by: Gregory Gray

Member of the Minnesota House of Representatives from district 57B
- In office January 6, 1987 – January 4, 1993
- Preceded by: Randy Staten
- Succeeded by: Pat Beard

Personal details
- Born: Richard H. Jefferson; January 20, 1931 Cincinnati, Ohio, U.S.
- Died: June 28, 2021 (aged 90) Cedar, Minnesota, U.S.
- Party: Democratic
- Spouse: Alice Johnson (m. 1999)

Richard H. Jefferson (January 20, 1931 – June 28, 2021) was an American politician who served in the Minnesota House of Representatives from 1987 to 1999. Jefferson graduated from Xavier University of Louisiana and was a chemist. He lived in Minneapolis, Minnesota when he was elected to the Minnesota Legislature. His nickname was "Jeff."

He died on June 28, 2021, in Cedar, Minnesota at age 90.
