= Republican Party of Minnesota =

Political party which is the Minnesota state affiliate of the US Republican Party

- Logo (2022)
- Chairperson: Alex Plechash
- Senate Leader: Mark Johnson
- House Speaker: Lisa Demuth
- Founded: March 29, 1855; 171 years ago; Minneapolis, Minnesota
- Headquarters: 7400 Metro Boulevard Suite 424; Edina, Minnesota
- Student wing: College Republicans
- Youth wing: Young Republicans
- Ideology: Conservatism
- National affiliation: Republican Party
- Colors: Red
- Minnesota Senate: 33 / 67
- Minnesota House of Representatives: 67 / 134
- Statewide Executive Offices: 0 / 5
- United States Senate: 0 / 2
- United States House of Representatives: 4 / 8

Election symbol

Website
- www.mngop.org

The Republican Party of Minnesota is the state affiliate of the Republican Party in Minnesota and Minnesota's oldest active political party. Founded in 1855, it is headquartered in Edina, Minnesota, and its chairman is Alex Plechash.

Since 2011, as a result of the 2010 Minnesota elections, the Republican Party of Minnesota has held no statewide executive offices or U.S. Senate seats. It holds exactly half, or 67, of the 134 seats in the Minnesota House of Representatives, and is the minority party in the Minnesota Senate by one seat. The party controls four of Minnesota's congressional districts, as do the Democrats. The last Republican governor of Minnesota was Tim Pawlenty, who served from 2003 to 2011.

The last Republican presidential nominee to win Minnesota was Richard Nixon in 1972. Minnesota is the state with the longest streak of not voting for the Republican nominee in presidential elections; it was the only state not to vote for Ronald Reagan in either the 1980 United States presidential election or the 1984 United States presidential election.

== History ==
=== Early history ===
The Republican Party in Minnesota was the state's dominant party for about the first 70 years of Minnesota's statehood, from 1858 through the 1920s. In the Civil War, Minnesota supported Abolitionism and the Union. Republican candidates routinely won the state governorship and most other state offices, having 12 out of the first 13.

The 1892 Republican National Convention was held in Minneapolis. The party was aided by an opposition divided between the Democratic Party and the Minnesota Farmer-Labor Party, which eventually merged in 1944.

=== Independent-Republican era ===
The Independent-Republicans of Minnesota (I-R) was the party's name from November 15, 1975, to September 23, 1995. The name was changed because the "Republican" brand was widely thought to have been damaged by the Watergate scandal. Polls in the early-mid-1970s indicated Minnesotans were more likely to vote for candidates who identified as Independents than Republicans. During that time, the state party became more dependent on grassroots fundraising and eventually went bankrupt. After the national party pumped money into it in the early-mid-1980s, its image and base began turning more conservative. During this time the party held both of Minnesota's U.S. Senate seats and briefly controlled the state House of Representatives. By 1994, the grassroots had turned socially more conservative, and the name changed back in 1995. Attempts to drop "Independent" had been defeated in 1989, 1991, and 1993.

=== 2000-2010s ===
In the 2006 U.S. Senate election, the party endorsed Mark Kennedy for United States Senate. He lost to Amy Klobuchar.

In the 2008 U.S. Senate election, incumbent Republican Senator Norm Coleman lost to Democratic-Farmer-Labor nominee Al Franken by 312 votes out of over 2.5 million cast after a long series of contentious recounts and lawsuits.

The party was fined $170,000 for violating federal campaign finance regulations from 2003 to 2008. Minnesota Republican Party chairman Tony Sutton was convicted of breaking finance laws in the 2010 gubernatorial election recount and fined $33,000.

Minnesota's most recent Republican governor is Tim Pawlenty. He was elected in 2002 and reelected in 2006. In 2010, Republican gubernatorial nominee Tom Emmer lost to DFL nominee Mark Dayton. While losing every executive race in 2010, the party captured both chambers of the Minnesota Legislature for the first time since the 1970s, and 18-term Representative Jim Oberstar lost to Republican nominee Chip Cravaack in Minnesota's 8th district.

==== 2010 gubernatorial race ====
In the 2010 statewide elections, the party endorsed State Representative Tom Emmer and Metropolitan Council member Annette Meeks for governor and lieutenant governor. State Representative Dan Severson was the endorsed candidate for secretary of state. Attorney and psychologist Chris Barden was the endorsed candidate for attorney general. Patricia Anderson was the endorsed candidate for state auditor. All five lost their elections.

After the 2010 gubernatorial recount, the party was heavily in debt, owing $2 million primarily for the recount. It had stopped paying rent on its headquarters near the Capitol and the landlord filed an eviction summons once the party fell $111,000 behind in rent. In January 2014, it announced it would move its headquarters to Minneapolis's Seward neighborhood. The new headquarters is diagonally across from the Seward Community Cafe and shares a building with a Pizza Luce. Party Chairman Keith Downey said the party had moved out of St. Paul "to be closer to the people". The headquarters were later moved to Edina. After taking control of both houses of the State Legislature for the first time in three decades in 2010, the party lost them both in 2012.

=== Recent history ===
In 2021, the Minnesota Republican Party became a subject of controversy when donor and strategist Anton Lazzaro was indicted for sex trafficking charges. Minnesota Chairwoman Jennifer Carnahan resigned amid the controversy.

Republican nominee Scott Jensen lost the 2022 gubernatorial race to incumbent Tim Walz. The party also lost its majority in the Minnesota Senate, giving the DFL a trifecta, but kept its four seats in the U.S. House of Representatives.

== Ideology and voter base ==
The Minnesota Republican Party's base is in rural and suburban parts of Greater Minnesota.

=== 2022 party platform ===
The party's 2022 platform opposed abortion access, calling for the overturning of Supreme Court decision Roe v. Wade, which subsequently happened, and of the Minnesota ruling Doe v. Gomez, which still stands. It also opposed legal recognition of same-sex marriage and supported "prohibition of Ranked Choice Voting in Minnesota." On gun policy, the platform said that citizens who follow the law should "have the right to purchase and possess firearms, free from any gun registration system." On education, the platform opposed "any element of Critical Race Theory or associated curricula and programs."

== Current elected officials ==
The Minnesota Republican Party holds none of the five statewide elected offices, neither United States Senate seat, and four of the state's eight United States House of Representatives seats. It holds a minority of seats in the Minnesota Senate and exactly half the seats in the Minnesota House of Representatives.

=== Members of Congress ===
==== U.S. Senate ====
- None

Both of Minnesota's U.S. Senate seats have been held by Democrats since 2009. Norm Coleman was the last Republican to represent Minnesota in the U.S. Senate.

==== U.S. House of Representatives ====
Of the eight seats Minnesota is apportioned in the U.S. House of Representatives, Republicans hold four:

District	Member	Photo
1st	Brad Finstad	
6th	Tom Emmer (House Majority Whip → House Minority Whip-designate)	
7th	Michelle Fischbach	
8th	Pete Stauber	

=== Statewide offices ===
- None

Minnesota has not elected a Republican to statewide office since 2006, when Tim Pawlenty was narrowly reelected governor. Pawlenty opted not to seek reelection in 2010. State representative Tom Emmer was the Republican nominee in the 2010 election and lost to DFL nominee Mark Dayton.

=== State legislature ===
- Senate Minority Leader: Mark Johnson
- Speaker of the House: Lisa Demuth

== List of Chairs ==
- P. Kenneth Peterson (1950–1953)
- Ron Eibensteiner (1999–2005)
- Ron Carey (2005–2009)
- Tony Sutton (2009–2011)
- Pat Shortridge (2011–2013)
- Keith Downey (2013–2017)
- Jennifer Carnahan (2017–2021)
- David Hann (2021–2024)
- Alex Plechash (2024–present)

== Electoral history ==
=== President ===
Election	Republican Ticket	Total Vote	Voteshare	Result
1932	Herbert Hoover/Charles Curtis	363,959	36.29%	Lost
1936	Alf Landon/Frank Knox	350,461	31.01%	Lost
1940	Wendell Willkie/Charles L. McNary	596,274	47.66%	Lost
1944	Thomas E. Dewey/John W. Bricker	527,416	46.86%	Lost
1948	Thomas E. Dewey/Earl Warren	483,617	39.89%	Lost
1952	Dwight D. Eisenhower/Richard Nixon	763,211	55.33%	Won
1956	Dwight D. Eisenhower/Richard Nixon	719,302	53.68%	Won
1960	Richard Nixon/Henry Cabot Lodge Jr.	757,915	49.16%	Lost
1964	Barry Goldwater/William E. Miller	559,624	36.00%	Lost
1968	Richard Nixon/Spiro Agnew	658,643	41.46%	Lost
1972	Richard Nixon/Spiro Agnew	898,269	51.58%	Won
1976	Gerald Ford/Bob Dole	819,395	42.02%	Lost
1980	Ronald Reagan/George H. W. Bush	873,241	42.56%	Lost
1984	Ronald Reagan/George H. W. Bush	1,032,603	49.54%	Lost
1988	George H. W. Bush/Dan Quayle	962,337	45.90%	Lost
1992	George H. W. Bush/Dan Quayle	747,841	31.85%	Lost
1996	Bob Dole/Jack Kemp	766,476	34.96%	Lost
2000	George W. Bush/Dick Cheney	1,109,659	45.50%	Lost
2004	George W. Bush/Dick Cheney	1,346,695	47.61%	Lost
2008	John McCain/Sarah Palin	1,275,409	43.82%	Lost
2012	Mitt Romney/Paul Ryan	1,320,225	44.96%	Lost
2016	Donald Trump/Mike Pence	1,323,232	44.93%	Lost
2020	Donald Trump/Mike Pence	1,484,065	45.28%	Lost
2024	Donald Trump/JD Vance	1,519,032	46.68%	Lost

=== State ===
==== Governor ====
Year	Candidate	Votes	%	Won
1857	Alexander Ramsey	17,550	49.66	No
1859	Alexander Ramsey	21,335	54.82	Yes
1861	Alexander Ramsey	16,274	60.9	Yes
1863	Stephen Miller	19,628	60.6	Yes
1865	William Rainey Marshall	17,318	55.58	Yes
1867	William Rainey Marshall	34,874	54.17	Yes
1869	Horace Austin	27,348	50.17	Yes
1871	Horace Austin	46,950	60.06	Yes
1873	Cushman Kellogg Davis	40,741	52.90	Yes
1875	John S. Pillsbury	47,073	56.08	Yes
1877	John S. Pillsbury	57,071	57.05	Yes
1879	John S. Pillsbury	57,524	54.18	Yes
1881	Lucius Frederick Hubbard	65,025	61.59	Yes
1883	Lucius Frederick Hubbard	72,462	53.42	Yes
1886	Andrew Ryan McGill	107,064	48.54	Yes
1888	William Rush Merriam	134,355	51.35	Yes
1890	William Rush Merriam	88,111	36.58	Yes
1892	Knute Nelson	109,220	42.68	Yes
1894	Knute Nelson	147,943	49.94	Yes
1896	David Marston Clough	165,806	49.17	Yes
1898	William Henry Eustis	111,796	44.26	No
1900	Samuel Rinnah Van Sant	152,905	48.67	Yes
1902	Samuel Rinnah Van Sant	155,849	57.53	Yes
1904	Robert C. Dunn	140,130	46.13	No
1906	Albert L. Cole	96,162	34.78	No
1908	Jacob F. Jacobson	147,997	43.88	No
1910	Adolph Olson Eberhart	164,185	55.73	Yes
1912	Adolph Olson Eberhart	129,688	40.73	Yes
1914	William E. Lee	143,730	41.87	No
1916	Joseph A. A. Burnquist	245,841	62.94	Yes
1918	Joseph A. A. Burnquist	166,515	42.73	Yes
1920	J. A. O. Preus	415,805	53.06	Yes
1922	J. A. O. Preus	309,756	45.21	Yes
1924	Theodore Christianson	406,692	48.71	Yes
1926	Theodore Christianson	395,779	56.49	Yes
1928	Theodore Christianson	549,857	55.00	Yes
1930	Ray P. Chase	289,528	36.31	No
1932	Earle Brown	334,081	32.34	No
1934	Martin A. Nelson	396,359	37.72	No
1936	Martin A. Nelson	431,841	38.55	No
1938	Harold Stassen	678,839	59.92	Yes
1940	Harold Stassen	654,686	52.06	Yes
1942	Harold Stassen	409,800	51.60	Yes
1944	Edward John Thye	701,185	61.59	Yes
1946	Luther Youngdahl	519,067	58.96	Yes
1948	Luther Youngdahl	643,572	53.15	Yes
1950	Luther Youngdahl	635,800	60.75	Yes
1952	C. Elmer Anderson	785,125	55.33	Yes
1954	C. Elmer Anderson	538,865	46.80	No
1956	Ancher Nelsen	685,196	48.18	No
1958	George MacKinnon	490,731	42.31	No
1960	Elmer Andersen	783,813	50.56	Yes
1962	Elmer Andersen	619,751	49.71	No
1966	Harold LeVander	680,593	52.55	Yes
1970	Douglas M. Head	621,780	45.54	No
1974	John W. Johnson	376,722	29.35	No
1978	Al Quie	830,019	52.35	Yes
1982	Wheelock Whitney, Jr.	711,796	39.86	No
1986	Cal Ludeman	606,755	43.09	No
1990	Arne Carlson	895,988	50.11	Yes
1994	Arne Carlson	1,094,165	63.34	Yes
1998	Norm Coleman	717,350	34.29	No
2002	Tim Pawlenty	999,473	44.37	Yes
2006	Tim Pawlenty	1,028,568	46.69	Yes
2010	Tom Emmer	910,462	43.21	No
2014	Jeff Johnson	879,257	44.51	No
2018	Jeff Johnson	1,097,705	42.43	No
2022	Scott Jensen	1,119,941	44.61	No
2026	Lisa Demuth	1,206,592	42.6	No

== See also ==
- Republican Party of Minnesota v. White
- Politics of Minnesota
- List of political parties in Minnesota
