= Carly Fiorina 2016 presidential campaign =

Campaign for US presidency

Carly for President
- Campaign: 2016 Republican Party presidential primaries
- Candidate: Carly Fiorina; CEO of Hewlett-Packard (1999–2005)
- Affiliation: Republican Party
- Status: Announced: May 4, 2015; Suspended: February 10, 2016
- Headquarters: 1020 N Fairfax St., Ste. 200; Alexandria, Virginia
- Key people: Frank Sadler (campaign manager); Sarah Isgur Flores (deputy campaign manager); Anna Epstein (spokeswoman); Amy Noone Frederick (senior advisor); Rebecca Schieber (personal assistant/"aide de camp")
- Receipts: US$26,551,387 (2017-3-31)
- Slogan(s): "New Possibilities. Real Leadership."

Website
- carlyforpresident.com (archived - February 9, 2016)

The 2016 presidential campaign of Carly Fiorina was announced in a video message posted on May 4, 2015. Fiorina was formerly chief executive officer of the technology company Hewlett-Packard, and was the Republican nominee for U.S. Senate in California in 2010.

Fiorina suspended her campaign for the Republican presidential nomination on February 10, 2016. On April 27, 2016, Ted Cruz announced that Fiorina would be his running mate should he win the nomination. She joined his campaign days before the Indiana Primary, which he lost. Cruz suspended his campaign that evening, effectively ending Fiorina's vice-presidential bid. After the election, however, Fiorina received one electoral vote for vice president from a faithless elector from Texas; the other 37, as pledged, voted for Mike Pence.

== Background ==
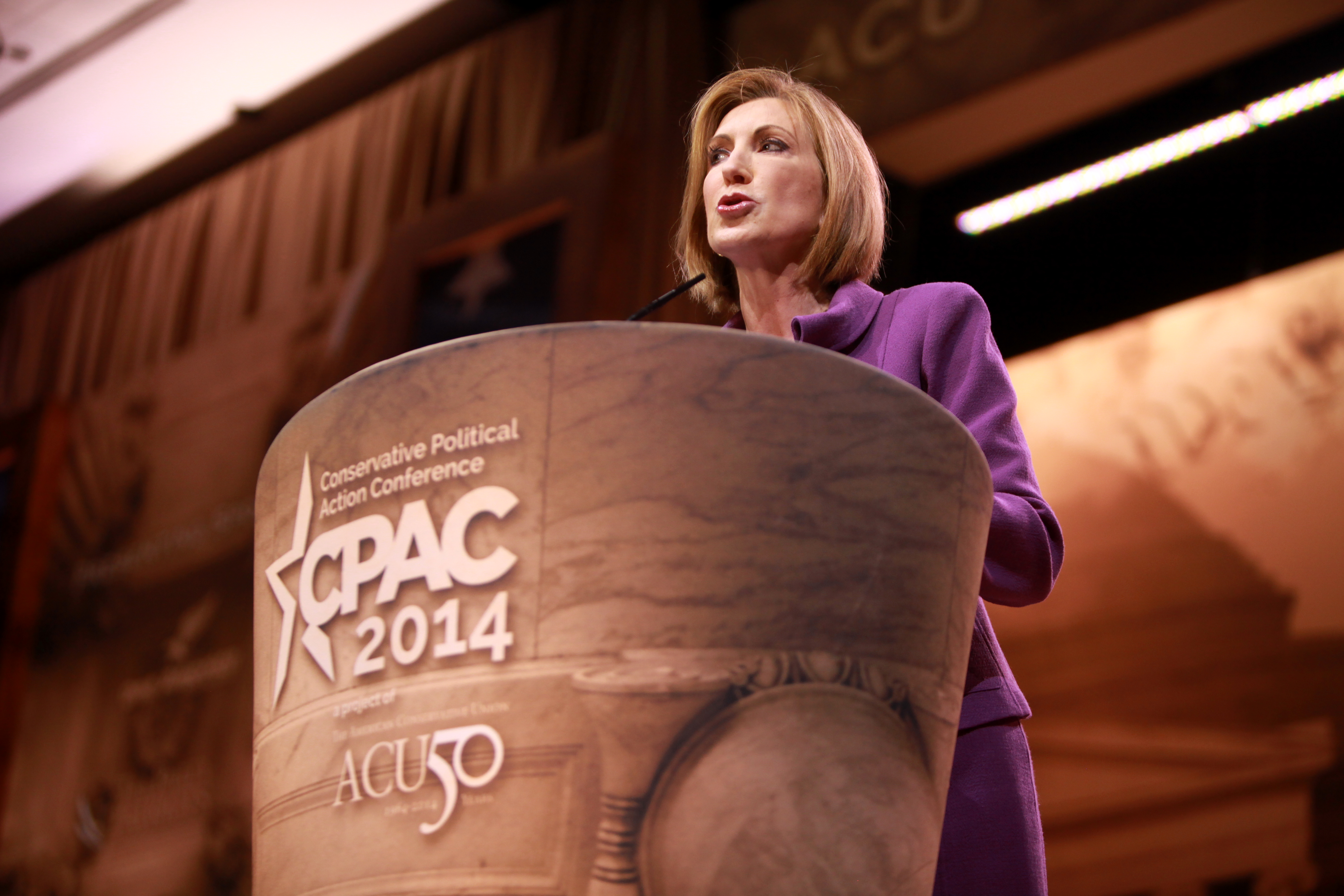
Carly Fiorina speaking at the 2014 Conservative Political Action Conference (CPAC) in National Harbor, Maryland, March 2014.

A candidate for the United States Senate in 2010, Fiorina ruled out running for the U.S. Senate in 2016, but did not rule out running for President in 2016. In November 2014, The Washington Post reported that Fiorina was "actively exploring" a run for president. Her business background and status as the only CEO and the only woman in a "sea of suited men" were mentioned as positives, with Republican strategists pointing to her unsuccessful 2010 Senate campaign, unpaid campaign debt and dismissal from HP as "considerable challenges." On March 29, 2015, Fiorina told Fox News Sunday host Chris Wallace there was a "higher than 90 percent" chance that she would enter the race to be the Republican Party nominee in the 2016 presidential election.

== Campaign ==
=== Announcement and media blitz ===
In the weeks leading up to her campaign announcement, Fiorina made numerous strategic appearances in the key battleground states of Iowa and New Hampshire. Fiorina announced her candidacy on May 4, 2015, via an online video posted by her campaign, followed by appearances on ABC's Good Morning America and The Kelly File. On May 5, Fiorina made publicized appearances on Today and Late Night with Seth Meyers. After days of national media appearances described as a "media blitz," Fiorina returned to campaign in Iowa on May 7.

=== Controversy over tenure at Lucent and Hewlett-Packard ===
Shortly after Fiorina announced her entry into the 2016 presidential race, and in a replay of her 2010 senatorial race, social media and editorial outlets referenced her tenure as HP's CEO and chair as a basis for her run for president. Commentators challenged Fiorina's claims of success, citing dozens of examples and anecdotes of why Fiorina had allegedly failed in her business leadership roles at both Hewlett-Packard and Lucent. The discussion revolved around the 30,000 U.S. job cuts as well as offshoring, which Fiorina directed during her tenure at HP, contrasting it with the high compensation bonuses she received from the company, and the events surrounding her resignation from HP. Campaign manager Sarah Isgur Flores deflected the criticism saying, Fiorina "worked hard to save as many jobs as possible", and her defenders argued that Fiorina made difficult and unpopular decisions to turn around a struggling firm.

Other discussions focused on her well-documented public record, including coverage of risky vendor financing programs that Fiorina was said to have supported during her time as Lucent's president of consumer products. The programs, which allegedly inflated the company's revenue figures to the benefit of Fiorina's bonus payout, were said to have contributed to the downfall of the company, formerly part of the iconic AT&T Bell Labs organization.

On the afternoon of May 4, 2015, a website appeared under the domain name CarlyFiorina.org stating that Fiorina's organization had failed to register the domain and criticizing her tenure as CEO. According to The Hill, the site was created by an employee of the Service Employees International Union, a labor union representing over 1.9 million US service industry employees.

On May 10, Fiorina appeared on Meet the Press; responding to host Chuck Todd's question asking if Fiorina has "regrets about those layoffs [that occurred while she was CEO of HP]", Fiorina said that they doubled the size of the company, grew it from 2% to 9%, tripled the rate of innovation to 11 patents a day, and grew jobs in the U.S. and abroad. She added "I had to make tough calls during tough times. Tough times that many technology companies didn't survive at all. Andrew Sorkin, from The New York Times, challenged Fiorina's assertions about her success as a businesswoman, writing that these percentages refer to revenue and not profit, and that the revenue growth was a result of acquisitions.

In August 2015, and in what was reported as a rebuttal to Sorkin's article, Tom Perkins, who was one of the HP board members who voted to oust Fiorina, published a full-page ad in the form of a letter in The New York Times, paid for by a pro-Fiorina super PAC "CARLY for America", in which he commented on the firing from HP by saying: "Critics often claim Carly was fired at HP because she was unsuccessful. As a member of the board, I can tell you this is not true. In truth, it was the Board I was a part of that was ineffective and dysfunctional."

In mid-September 2015, Fiorina addressed previous criticism from Yale business management scholar Jeffrey Sonnenfeld who had said in 2008 that Fiorina used a "street bully" style of management, and that she had been a failure as HP's CEO. He also described in August 2015 how Fiorina was saying she had doubled revenue at HP, but Sonnenfeld said this was an empty metric; the real gauge was that HP had lost 52% of its value during her tenure. Donald Trump, a Republican contender against Fiorina in the 2016 presidential race, used Sonnenfeld's analysis against her during the second televised debate in 2015, and she countered by calling Sonnenfeld a "Clintonite". Sonnenfeld wrote back in Politico magazine that problems with Fiorina's leadership style were what caused HP to lose half its value during her tenure. He said she does not admit mistakes and thus does not learn from them, that she manipulates statistics, that she makes poor executive decisions, and that she turns to ad hominem attacks when others oppose her plans. Sonnenfeld responded that four of the 2016 Republican presidential candidates had requested and received his advice, and that he had never been a "Clintonite".

Meg Whitman, the current CEO of Hewlett Packard, who endorsed Governor Chris Christie during the primaries, stated that in her opinion while Fiorina was a good CEO, she was not qualified to be President of the United States, stating that a business background is important but that having worked in government is also important, and that "it's very difficult for your first role in politics to be President of the United States".

=== June–July campaigning ===
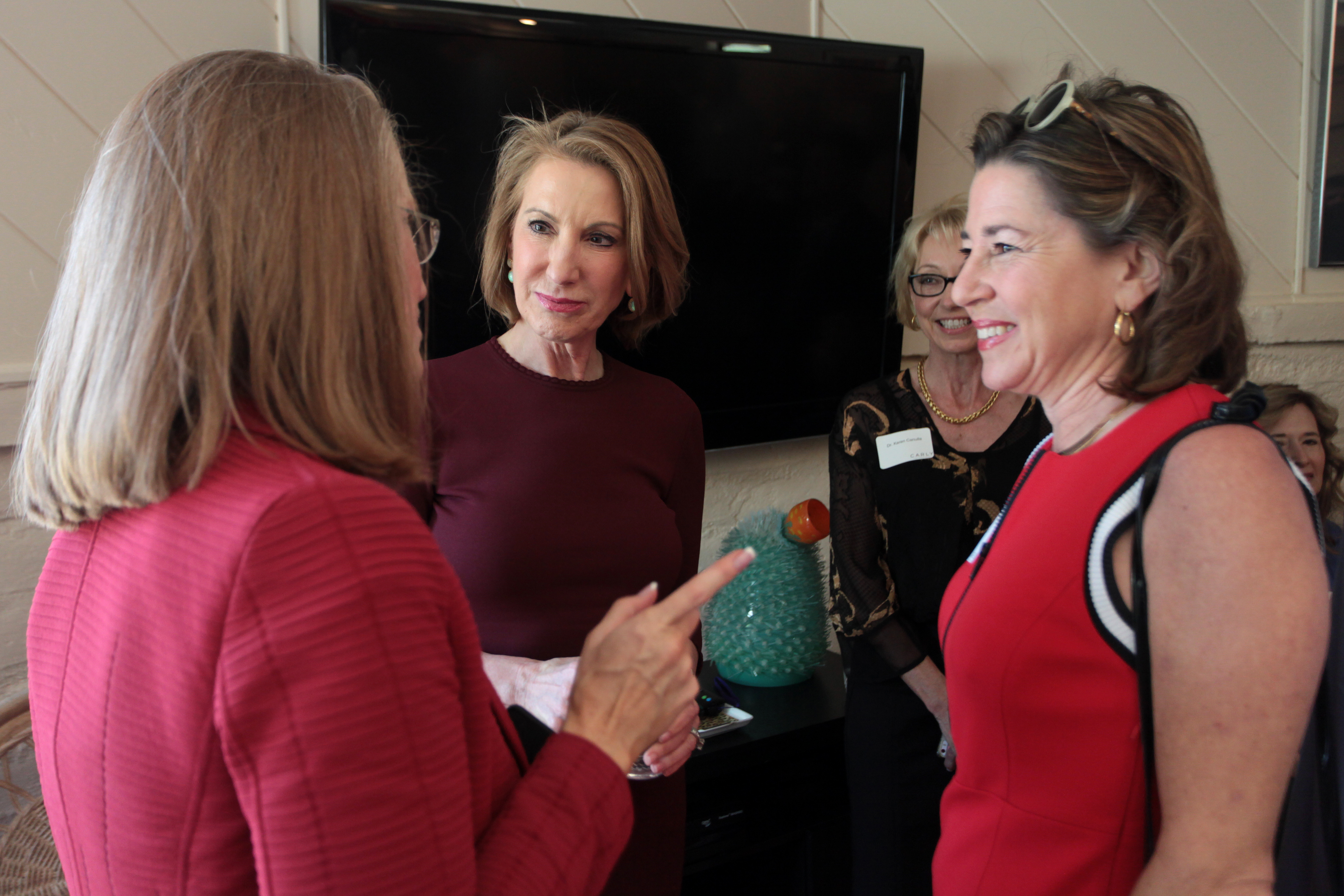
The candidate meeting with supporters at a coffee reception and fundraising event in Paradise Valley, Arizona.

Fiorina's presidential campaign had provoked both praise and criticism. The National Review pointed out her foil to Hillary Clinton (also a female presidential candidate), saying "Carly Fiorina is no doubt getting attention because of her unique background, but more and more people are staying to listen because she has something fresh to say", and that "Fiorina also seems to relish the role of being the most pointed critic of Hillary Clinton…. She contrasts her background as a 'problem solver' with Clinton's record as a professional politician." The Nation commented, "With so-called women's issues poised to play an unprecedented role in the upcoming election, Republicans need someone who can troll Hillary Clinton without seeming sexist."

On July 6, the Fiorina campaign announced that it had raised $1.4 million in donations and the CARLY for America super PAC reported raising $3.4 million.

On July 16, Fiorina starred in a BuzzFeed video about sexism in the workplace. Fiorina became the second presidential hopeful to shoot a video with Buzzfeed, after Ted Cruz. The video generated praise for being bold and funny, as well as criticism that the video was divisive, pandering, and overtly liberal.

=== Performance in the first GOP debate ===
On August 6, Fiorina participated in Fox News's first GOP debate. Failing to qualify for one of the Fox News prime-time debate slots, she was relegated to the debate airing earlier the same day. Fiorina's performance led news sources to conclude she had won the early debate. Following the debate, pundits correctly predicted that her polling numbers would surge. On August 9, Fiorina reported an uptick in fundraising support. In an online poll by NBC and SurveyMonkey on August 10, Fiorina came in fourth of the seventeen Republican contenders with 8% of Republican primary voters saying they would support her in a primary or a caucus. This reflects a gain in support of six points from previous polling data.

An article on the Wall Street Journal in the aftermath of the debate, noted Fiorina's surge and described the challenge she will face in translating the post-debate bounce into a viable campaign for the nomination, citing the US$1.7 million she raised during her first two months of her campaign (US$3.4 from her super PAC), which is far less than other candidates, and her difficult tenure at HP.

=== Second GOP debate ===
On every national poll that was released after the first debate held on August 6, 2015, all showed Fiorina to be firmly within the top ten of Republican candidates. However, because CNN chose to include all national polls after July 10, 2015 (multiple weeks before the debate), and before September 10; before the September 16 debate, Fiorina consistently polled under 2%; and because a significantly larger number of polls was released before the debate Fiorina was projected to not make the later of the debates, which follow the same top ten formula as the first FOX debate to decide which candidate goes into which debate. Fiorina publicly requested that Republican National Committee, or RNC, force CNN to change their standards, and her Deputy Campaign Manager, Sarah Isgur Flores, wrote an article on the website Medium expressing annoyance with CNN's standards. On September 3, 2015, CNN decided to amend the criteria stating any candidate who ranks in the top 10 in polling between August 7 and September 10 would be included.

Fiorina's appearance on September 16, 2015, in the second debate at the Reagan Presidential Library was generally seen by the press as improving her standing in the Republican field. The New York Times described her performance as: "steely, self-assured and at times deeply personal", and as one which may "help correct a problem that her party has struggled with in recent elections: how to appeal more effectively to women". The Washington Post commented on how what they described as her "polished showing" and "widely praised performance" in the second televised Republican debate, "lit up social media and cable news". Time magazine called her performance a "strong showing" in which "Fiorina laid out detailed foreign policy visions, made an impassioned speech against Planned Parenthood and sparred with Donald Trump...." For her own part, Fiorina commenting to ABC's Good Morning America about her performance, said: "When I went into the debate, almost half the audience didn't know my name, and I introduced myself successfully."

In the debate, Fiorina misrepresented a Planned Parenthood sting video, describing a scene of an aborted fetus moving its limbs, which was not in the video. She was sharply criticized for this in the media; the gaffe consumed much of the post-debate coverage. Planned Parenthood responded that she had lied about the video, saying it was "not the first time Carly Fiorina has lied." PolitiFact chief editor Angie Drobnic Holan mentioned this factor in a December 2015 comparison of the presidential candidates with regard to their truthfulness. In the comparison, Fiorina scored 50% falsehood, the sixth worst performance.

=== Subsequent performance and campaign suspension ===
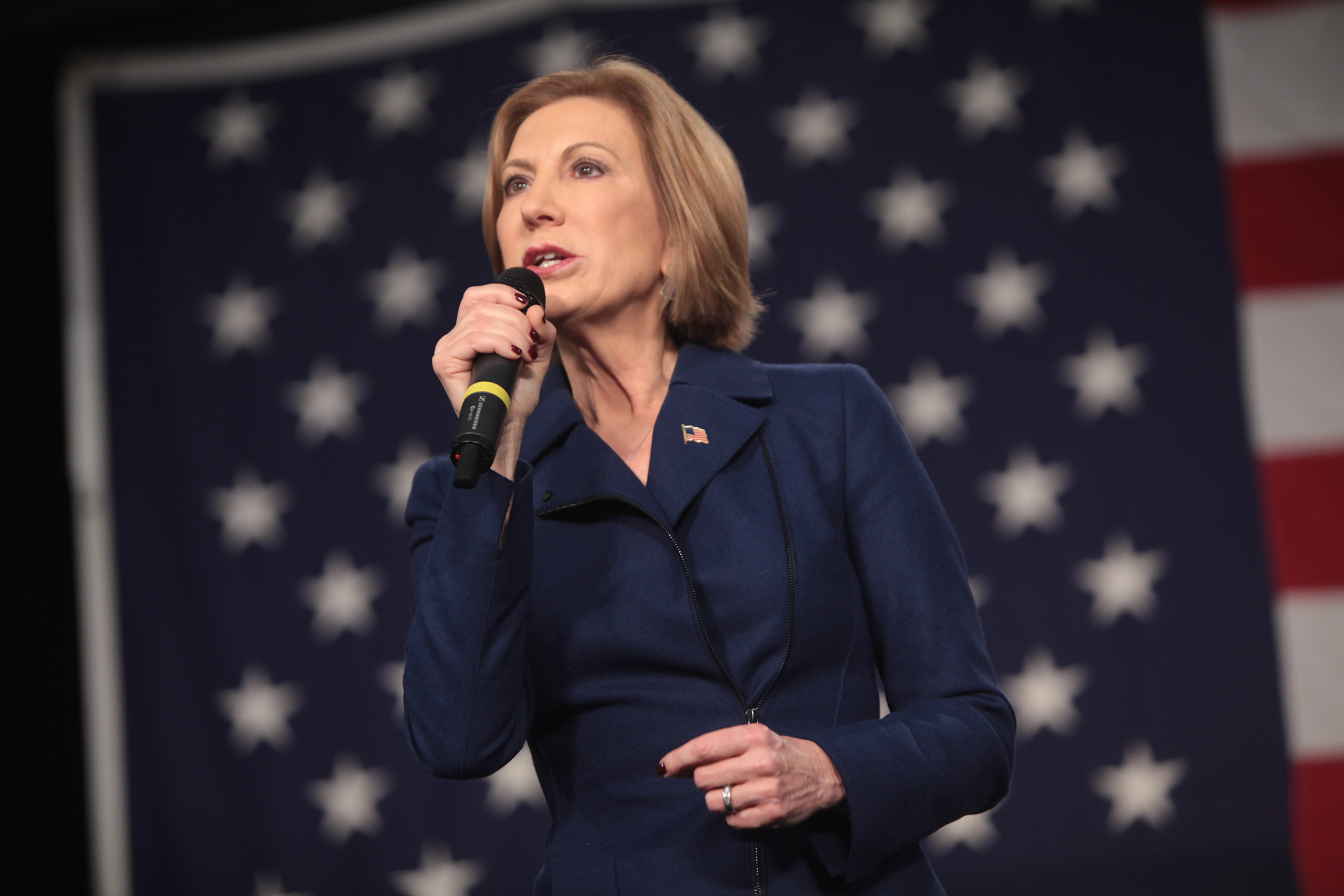
Fiorina speaking at an event hosted by the Iowa Republican Party in October 2015.

Her performances in early debates for the Republican primary nomination, particularly her rebukes of front-runner Donald Trump in the debate on September 16, 2015, earned her a significant spike in the polls from 3% to 15% post-debate, but her polling numbers dropped to 4% by October, and to 3% in December.

As a result of low polling numbers, Fiorina was left out of the ABC News debate on February 6, 2016, despite mounting a protest that included her, two fellow GOP presidential candidates (Sen. Ted Cruz and Dr. Ben Carson), and other high-profile GOP leaders such as Mitt Romney and Newt Gingrich to be included in the debate.

On February 10, 2016, Fiorina suspended her presidential campaign due to weak results in Iowa and New Hampshire. She received two percent of the votes in the Iowa caucuses and four percent of the votes in the New Hampshire primary. On March 9, she formally endorsed Ted Cruz for president.

== Political positions ==
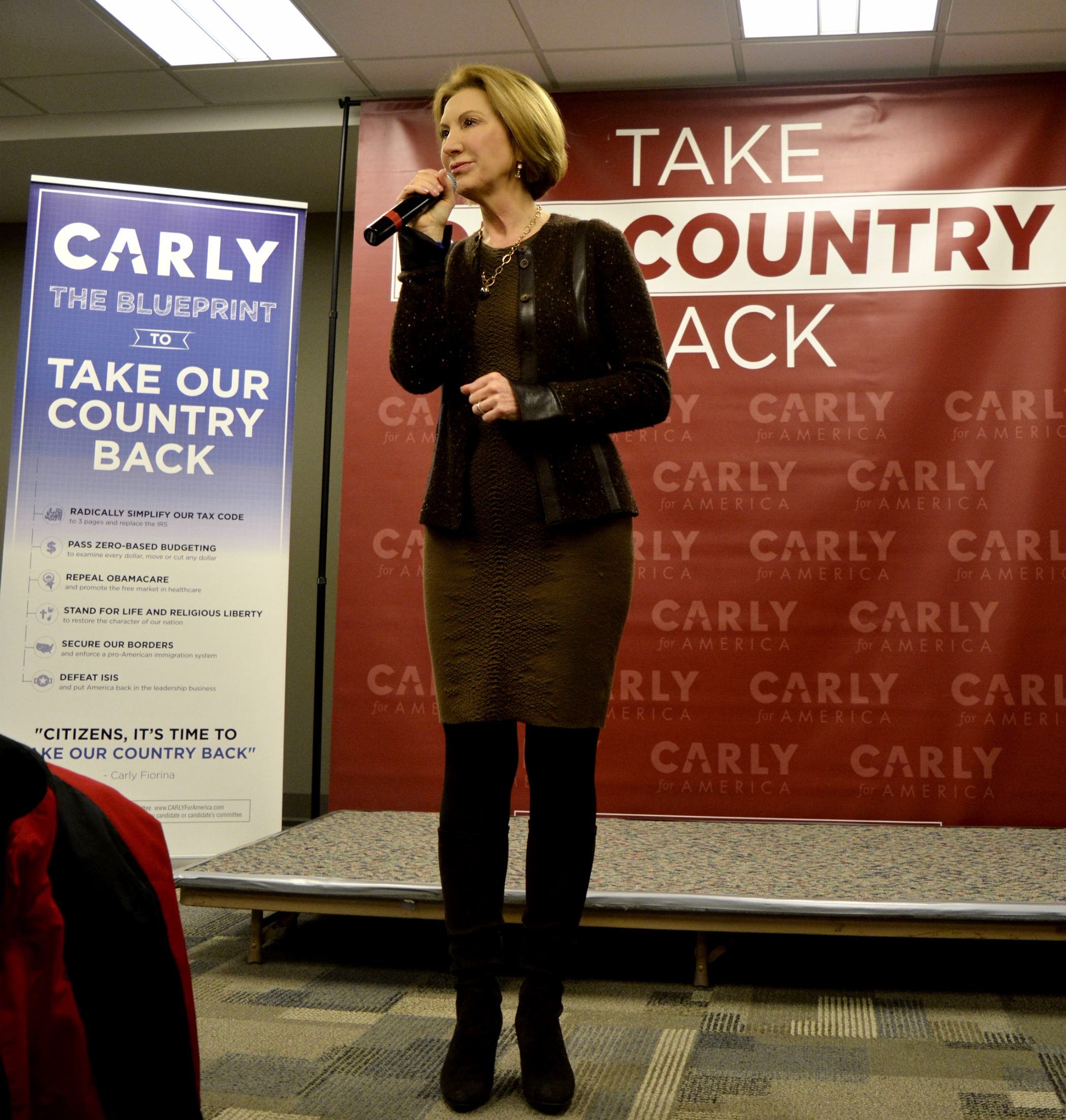
Carly Fiorina introduced her campaign platform at a town hall before the 2016 Iowa caucuses

=== Abortion ===
Fiorina describes herself as pro-life. She has expressed support for legislation to ban abortions 20 weeks after fertilization, with an exception for cases of rape, incest, or danger to the life of the mother. Fiorina supports overturning Roe v. Wade, the 1973 ruling by the Supreme Court which legalized abortion in the United States, and leaving it for the states to decide. Fiorina opposed criminalizing abortion and said she would not apply a litmus test when considering judges.

The National Right to Life Committee, the Susan B. Anthony List and the California ProLife Council all endorsed Fiorina's 2010 U.S. Senate campaign in California.

Fiorina supports eliminating federal funding for Planned Parenthood, the largest single provider of abortions in the United States, performing over 300,000 per year. The use of federal funds for abortions is mostly banned under current law.

During the September 16, 2015, GOP presidential candidates' debate on CNN, Fiorina criticized Planned Parenthood for their involvement in abortions. She referred to the secret recordings made by The Center for Medical Progress (CMP), and stated:

"As regards Planned Parenthood, anyone who has watched this videotape, I dare Hillary Clinton, Barack Obama to watch these tapes. Watch a fully formed fetus on the table, its heart beating, its legs kicking, while someone says we have to keep it alive to harvest its brain. This is about the character of our nation, and if we will not stand up and force President Obama to veto this bill, shame on us."

According to The Wall Street Journal, "there was never any video that depicted, as Ms. Fiorina stated, a live fetus on a table being prepared for organ harvesting." PolitiFact.com noted that a completely different video produced by an anti-abortion group contains stock footage of a fetus added for dramatic effect. Fiorina's claim made it sound as if there is actual footage of Planned Parenthood examining an aborted fetus whose heart is still beating, which was false. PolitiFact said "Fiorina makes it sound as if the footage shows what Planned Parenthood is alleged to have done. In fact, the stock footage was added to the video to dramatize its content. We rate her statement Mostly False." As PolitiFact.com pointed out, Fiorina is likely talking about a video showing an interview with a woman talking about a scene similar to the one Fiorina describes; the video's creators have supplemented her interview with grisly stock footage of a fetus outside the womb."

=== Climate change ===
In a February 2015 speech, Fiorina acknowledged the scientific consensus that climate change is real and caused by human activity, but remained doubtful that government can affect the issue and has "implied that targeting the coal industry will not solve the problem".

On April 4, 2015, Fiorina spoke out about climate change in her home state of California as well as how the state has fared in the drought, stating that "liberal environmentalists" have brought what she described as a "tragedy" and that California is an example of "liberals being willing to sacrifice other people's lives and livelihoods at the altar of their ideology".

=== Drugs ===
Fiorina said in May 2015 that "drug addiction shouldn't be criminalized" and cited "decriminalizing drug addiction and drug use" as an example of a successful reform.

Fiorina opposes legalization of marijuana, but says that she believes in states' rights and that as president she will not enforce the federal ban on marijuana in Colorado, where voters have legalized marijuana as a matter of state law.

=== Economy ===
Fiorina opposed the 2009 federal stimulus act, calling it a waste of taxpayer money.

Fiorina has said she would cut the pay of federal workers and base their compensation on performance.

=== Education ===
Fiorina is a critic of the Common Core State Standards, calling them a "heavy-handed and standardized" example of "Washington bureaucracy". According to PBS, "In a position paper while running for the U.S. Senate in California, Fiorina strongly advocated for metric-based accountability in schools. She praised No Child Left Behind as setting high standards and Race to the Top for using internationally-benchmarked measures." Fiorina has also argued for a reduced federal role in education, saying, "The bigger our education department becomes, the worse our public education becomes. There's no connection between spending more money in our nation's capital and a better school system. "

In 2010, Fiorina indicated that she would support "a voucher program for the areas, or neighborhoods, or student populations most in need". In 2015, Fiorina wrote that she supported a school choice or voucher program for all students. In February 2015, Fiorina stated, "Parents should be given choice, competition, and accountability in the classroom."

Fiorina stated at the 2015 Conservative Political Action Conference that President Obama's proposal for free community college was intended "to distract us from the fact that we have too many failing high schools".

At a May 2015 event, Fiorina asserted that the federal government "in the last several years under the Obama administration has nationalized the student loan industry". The Annenberg Public Policy Center's FactCheck.org stated that "Fiorina gave a misleading description" since "private and federal student loans are available now, just as they were in the past."

=== Embryonic Stem cell research ===
Fiorina supports the use of human embryos in stem cell research provided that the embryos were not created for that purpose. In a 2010 debate, she said, "I've also been very clear in saying if embryos were going to be destroyed in any event, that I have no trouble with research."

=== Foreign and military policy ===
Fiorina has criticized the Iran nuclear agreement, based on a number of issues that she called "suspicious". She has said that Iran is not a good actor and did not negotiate in good faith, and that if the U.S. wanted to achieve a good deal then the negotiators on the U.S.'s behalf should have walked away from the bargaining table but never did. Fiorina also stated that the U.S. cannot trust the verification components of the deal because Iran does not allow access to military sites and Iran has broken sanctions and inspection agreements in the past, and that the approval of the international community is suspect because Russia and China were negotiating on Iran's behalf looking out for their own self-interests (specifically gaining access to Iran's economy) and the European Union negotiates weak deals.

Speaking on Russia–U.S. relations and the Russo-Ukrainian War during her 2015 campaign, Fiorina said that if president, "I wouldn't talk to him (Russian president Vladimir Putin) at all." Fiorina has said that if president, she would "stand up and arm Ukraine" and conduct more aggressive military exercises in the Baltic nations to "send a very clear message to Vladimir Putin." Fiorina also supported the missile defense program in Poland and increasing the U.S. troop presence in Germany.

In a January 2015 discussion with an Iowa political blogger, Fiorina said of the Chinese: "They're not terribly imaginative. They're not entrepreneurial. They don't innovate. That's why they're stealing our intellectual property."

Fiorina has criticized the international nuclear agreement with Iran, saying that Iran is "at the heart" of evil in the Middle East; that the agreement is a "flawed deal"; and that "there is a lot of reason to be suspicious" of it. Fiorina said that: "It would be different if Iran was a good actor and had negotiated in good faith all this time but they haven't" and said "If you want a good deal, you've got to walk away sometimes. We never did." Fiorina also suggested that verification provisions in the agreement were insufficient and that approval of the agreement by the international community and the U.S.'s negotiating partners was suspect because Russia and China have an interest in gaining access to Iran's economy and the European Union "has negotiated, frankly, a number of weak deals."

Fiorina expressed for a military building, calling specifically for an additional "50 Army brigades, 36 Marine battalions, between 300 and 350 naval ships, and an upgrade of 'every leg of the nuclear triad.'" This proposed military buildup would be an increase of more than US$500 billion (excluding a nuclear arsenal overhaul, which would cost some additional sum of money) over existing planned defense spending of US$5 trillion over the next decade.

Fiorina opposed the normalization of U.S.-Cuba relations, telling Hugh Hewitt that if elected she would close the U.S. embassy in Havana.

At a forum at The Citadel in September 2015, Fiorina said that if president she would cancel a scheduled state dinner during a visit by Chinese President Xi Jinping and instead would confront the leader on Chinese hacking: "I'd have a long conversation in the Oval Office to say, 'Understand, there will be consequences. We will retaliate. We consider this an act of aggression.'" Fiorina did not give specifics on what type of retaliatory measures she would favor if elected president.

Fiorina supports keeping the Guantanamo Bay detention camp in Cuba open.

In September 2015, Fiorina "offered a vigorous defense of CIA waterboarding," a tactic used by the United States during the George W. Bush-era war on terror. Fiorina rejected the conclusions of the Senate Intelligence Committee Study of the CIA's Detention and Interrogation Program (publicly released in 2014), which "portrayed waterboarding as 'near drownings' that were tantamount to torture and concluded that the agency's often brutal interrogations produced little actionable intelligence." Fiorina called the report "disingenuous" and "a shame" and said that "I believe that all of the evidence is very clear — that waterboarding was used in a very small handful of cases [and] was supervised by medical personnel in every one of those cases. And I also believe that waterboarding was used when there was no other way to get information that was necessary."

=== Health care ===
Fiorina has stated that the Affordable Care Act is a vast legislative overreach that did not fix the problem it started out to fix and created problems for everyone else. Among her criticisms of the Affordable Care Act is that the number of uninsured is not coming down fast enough, deductibles have gone up, and the amount of paperwork has increased. She supports repeal. Fiorina has proposed establishing federally subsidized but state-run "high-risk pools to help those who are truly needy." She has also supported an individual mandate requiring that individuals purchase "catastrophic care" insurance.

Referring to childhood vaccinations, Fiorina said: "When in doubt, it is always the parents' choice." Fiorina defended the right of school districts to require that children be vaccinated against common communicable diseases, but said that districts should not be permitted to require that children receive "some of these more esoteric immunizations" in order to attend public schools.

=== Immigration ===
In California, Fiorina supported the DREAM Act, which would allow children brought to the U.S. by their parents when they were under the age of 16 to secure permanent U.S. residency and a path to citizenship if they graduate from college or serve in the armed forces.

In a May 2015 interview with Katie Couric, Fiorina said that she does not support a path for citizenship "for those who came here illegally and who have stayed here illegally." Fiorina drew a distinction between people in that category and those who came legally but overstayed their visas.

Fiorina has stressed the need to improve border security before undertaking comprehensive immigration reform.

=== LGBT issues ===
In November 2009, in an interview by The Wall Street Journal, Fiorina said that she voted in favor of Proposition 8, a California ballot proposition which banned same-sex marriage in that state, but noted that "she created a strong program of domestic partner benefits while at HP".

During the 2010 United States Senate election in California, Fiorina was endorsed by GOProud, a gay conservative organization.

In 2010, while answering a Christian Coalition questionnaire, Fiorina said that she supported a federal constitutional amendment banning same-sex marriage. During an interview with the conservative Christian website Caffeinated Thoughts at a Dallas County, Iowa Republican event in May 2015, Fiorina reversed her previous position, saying that she now opposed such a measure: "I think the Supreme Court ruling will become the law of the land, and however much I may agree or disagree with it, I wouldn't support an amendment to reverse it." She further stated that "government shouldn't discriminate on how it provides benefits and ... people have a right to their religious views and those views need to be protected."

In August 2010, Fiorina indicated on a Christian Coalition questionnaire that she opposed enforcing the 1993 law banning homosexuals in the military.

In 2010, Fiorina stated that she supported the Defense of Marriage Act, but also supported civil unions. In 2015, Fiorina reaffirmed her support for civil unions and stated that those in such unions should receive the same government benefits accorded to married persons.

On September 19, 2010, in a Faith2Action survey, she opposed the Employment Non-Discrimination Act.

On March 17, 2013, on ABC News, Fiorina said "I think we have to be careful, because John Boehner's views, which are different from Rob Portman's views, are equally sincere. And I think when we get into trouble on this debate when we assume that people who support gay marriage are open and compassionate and people who don't are not. It's why I believe the right way to solve these very personal issues is to let people vote on them, don't have judges decide it, don't even have representative government decide it, let people vote on it in the states. I think people of both points of view, accept the democratic process. What they don't always accept is a bunch of self-important, self-appointed judges saying this is culturally the new norm."

In April 2015, Fiorina defended the Indiana's Religious Freedom Restoration Act and government benefits to same-sex couples. She stated that the Indiana bill is about the "opportunity to practice their religions freely" and "It has not and has never been a license to discriminate." On April 2, 2015, in an interview with USA Today, she described it as "shameful" how, in her view, liberals have fanned the furor over the Indiana law. "I honestly believe this is a set of liberal political activists who practice a game of identity politics and divisive politics to whip people into a frenzy, and I think it's very destructive to the fabric of this country," she said. She blasted business leaders in Silicon Valley and elsewhere who have criticized the Indiana law as discriminatory, questioning why there isn't similar outrage "in the Twitterverse about the subjugation of the rights of women and gays in many countries in which these companies do business. Where is the outrage about that? Where is the outrage about how gays are treated in Iran, for example? Where is the outrage about how women are treated in Algeria?"

During an April 2015 interview with ABC News, Fiorina stated, "I think it's really too bad, honestly, that CEOs are being pressured [...] What this law basically says is that a person can push back against ... either federal government mandate or state government mandate to exert their religious liberties. She also reaffirmed her support for civil unions.

In June 2015, as a response to the U.S. Supreme Court's decision in Obergefell v. Hodges, which held that there is a fundamental right to same-sex marriage under the Fourteenth Amendment, Fiorina said the decision was "only the latest example of an activist Court. I do not agree that the Court can or should redefine marriage. I believe that responsibility should have remained with states and voters where this conversation has continued in churches, town halls and living rooms around the country." In May 2015, however, she said that she hoped that the nation could support the Supreme Court's decision to legalize same-sex marriage and, at the same time, respect individual consciences. In 2017, Fiorina headlined the 40th anniversary gathering of Log Cabin Republicans, an LGBT Republican organization which supports same-sex marriage and other LGBT rights.

=== Maternity leave ===
Fiorina opposes federal legislation to require companies to provide paid maternity leave to their employees. Fiorina has said that the private sector should make these decisions, pointing out that HP, while she was CEO, offered paid maternity leave voluntarily, and that companies such as Netflix have done the same.

=== Minimum wage ===
Fiorina opposes a federal minimum wage increase, adding that she believes it "is a classic example of a policy that is best carried out in the states", saying a national minimum wage does not make sense because economic conditions in New Hampshire vary significantly from more expensive economic conditions in Los Angeles or New York. She also believes that raising the federal minimum wage would "hurt those who are looking for entry-level jobs."

=== Net neutrality ===
Fiorina opposes net neutrality rules adopted by the Federal Communications Commission and has said she would "roll back" that policy, because "Regulation over innovation is a really bad role for government."

=== Regulation ===
Fiorina "generally believes that reducing government regulations helps to spur the economy."

Fiorina has condemned the Dodd–Frank Wall Street Reform and Consumer Protection Act, saying in April 2015 that "We should get rid of Dodd-Frank and start again."

Fiorina has stated that not "a single regulation has ever been repealed." Glenn Kessler of The Washington Post "Fact Checker" column gave this statement three out of four Pinocchios, finding that "Important parts of the economy have been deregulated in recent decades. While the repeal of a specific rule is relatively rare, there are certainly examples." Susan E. Dudley, director of the Regulatory Studies Center at George Washington University, said that Fiorina is "generally right that regulations, once issued, are rarely revisited and even more rarely actually repealed".

=== Taxation ===
During her 2010 Senate campaign, Fiorina "called for eliminating the estate tax and capital gains taxes for investments in small businesses, and lowering marginal tax rates."

Fiorina opposes proposals to increase the federal gas tax or state gas taxes in order to fund the Highway Trust Fund, asserting in a February 2015 op-ed in The Wall Street Journal that "Any gas tax hike, big or small, will harm American families and hurt economic growth."

=== Technology employees ===
Fiorina favors expanding the H-1B visa program. Writing in opposition to proposals she considered protectionist in a 2004 op-ed in The Wall Street Journal, Fiorina said that while "America is the most innovative country," it would not remain so if the country were to "run away from the reality of the global economy." Fiorina said to Congress in 2004: "There is no job that is America's God-given right anymore. We have to compete for jobs as a nation." While Fiorina argued that the only way to "protect U.S. high-tech jobs over the long haul was to become more competitive [in the United States]," her comments prompted "strong reactions" from some technology workers, who argued that lower wages outside the United States encouraged the offshoring of American jobs.

== Endorsements ==
Carly Fiorina endorsements

Cabinet officials (former)

- Wallace Stickney, former Director of the Federal Emergency Management Agency

U.S. Representatives (current and former)

- Ann Marie Buerkle, former Representative from New York
- David F. Emery, former Representative from Maine
- Jeff Fortenberry, Representative from Nebraska
- Nan Hayworth, former Representative from New York,
- Lynn Jenkins, Representative from Kansas
- Candice Miller, Representative from Michigan

Statewide officials (current and former)

- Sue Ellspermann, then-Lieutenant Governor of Indiana and former Indiana State Representative.
- Chris Benge, Oklahoma Secretary of State
- Susan Combs, former Texas Comptroller of Public Accounts, former Texas Agriculture Commissioner and former Texas State Representative;
- John Dougall, Utah State Auditor
- Patrice Douglas, former member of the Oklahoma Corporation Commission and former Mayor of Edmond

State legislators

- Iowa State Senator: David Johnson
- Eight Iowa State Representatives: Steve Olson (2003–2015 including 2013–2014 as Speaker Pro Tempore) Chris Rants (1992–2010 including Speaker 2003–2006), Mike Sexton, Ross Paustian, Clel Baudler, Josh Byrnes, Lee Hein, Mike May
- Four New Hampshire State Senators: Sharon Carson, Jeanie Forrester, Thomas R. Eaton (former State Senate President), John Reagan
- Thirty New Hampshire State Representatives: Barbara Biggie, Gene Chandler (Deputy Speaker), Yvonne Dean-Bailey, Marilinda Garcia (2007–14), Edmond Gionet, Joe Guthrie, Bob Haefner, Joe Hagan, William Infantine (Labor Committee Chair), Phyllis M. Katsakiores, Rick Ladd, Peggy McCarthy, Kim Rice, James Webb, Rusty Bulis (former), Duffy Daugherty (former), Erin Hennessey, Henry Mock (former), Larry Rappaport, Eric Stohl (former), Jim Coburn (former), James F. Headd (former), Frank Kotowski, Mike McCarthy (former), Peter Spanos, Ernest Bridge Brian Gallagher, George Hurt, Herb Vadney, Michael Vose
- Three Arkansas State Representatives: Rebecca Petty, Robin Lundstrum, Grant Hodges
- Two Colorado State Representatives: Perry Buck., Jack Tate
- Delaware State Senator: Brian G. Pettyjohn.
- Delaware State Representative: Deborah Hudson.
- Four Georgia State Representatives: Earl Ehrhart, Penny Houston, Donna Sheldon (former), Valerie Clark
- Maine State Senator: Amy Volk
- Three Maine State Representatives: Wayne Parry, Deborah Sanderson, Heather Sirocki
- Massachusetts State Representative: Kevin Kuros, Sheila Harrington, Shaunna O'Connell
- Four Minnesota State Senators: Paul Gazelka, Mary Kiffmeyer, Carrie Ruud, David Hann (Minority Leader)
- Two Minnesota State Representatives: Jim Nash, Michelle Rifenberg (former)
- Two Nebraska State Senators: Galen Hadley (Speaker), Jim Smith
- Nevada State Senator: Sue Lowden (former)
- Member of the Nevada Assembly: Valerie Weber (former)
- Member of the New York State Assembly: Kieran Lalor
- North Carolina State Representative: Jon Hardister
- Oklahoma State Senator: Stephanie Bice
- Oklahoma State Representative: Hopper Smith
- Pennsylvania State Senator: Mike Brubaker (former)
- Pennsylvania State Representative: Judy Ward
- Two South Carolina State Representatives: Phyllis Henderson, Donna C. Hicks
- Two Tennessee State Representatives: Mary Littleton, Dawn White
- Two Utah State Senators: Wayne L. Niederhauser (President), Deidre Henderson
- Six Utah State Representatives: Kim Coleman, Keith Grover, Daniel McCay, Holly Richardson (former), Fred Cox
- Vermont State Senator: Peg Flory
- Two Vermont State Representatives: Robert Bancroft, Loren Shaw

Mayors and other municipal leaders

- Steve Bach, former Mayor of Colorado Springs
- Scott Smith, former Mayor of Mesa

Businesspeople

- Terry Neese, founder of Terry Neese Personnel Services and the Institute for the Economic Empowerment of Women
- Matt Jacobson, Executive Director of the Maine Lobster Marketing Collaborative
- Mike McFadden, co-CEO of Lazard Middle Market and 2014 nominee for U.S. Senator of MN
- Thomas Perkins, venture capitalist, co-founder of Kleiner Perkins Caufield and Byers, former board member of Hewlett Packard
- Marc Andreessen, venture capitalist, co-founder of Andreessen Horowitz

Celebrities, commentators, and activists

- Mary Jean Eisenhower, granddaughter of former President Dwight Eisenhower
- Ovide Lamontagne, attorney, activist, and two-time Republican nominee for Governor of New Hampshire.
- Michael Moriarty, actor
- Donnie Wahlberg, actor
- Georgia: Jef Fincher (grassroots activist), Patrick Moore (managing partner, Set Consulting), Cory Ruth (managing partner, Mergence Global)
- Minnesota: David Strom (former President of the Taxpayers League of Minnesota)
- Nevada: Lia Roberts (former leader of the Nevada Republican Party)
- Vermont: Len Britton (business owner and former Republican U.S. Senate nominee)

== Vice presidential campaign ==
On April 27, 2016, Sen. Ted Cruz announced that Fiorina would be his running mate should he win the nomination. She joined his campaign in the Indiana primary, which he lost. Cruz then suspended his campaign that evening. Fiorina's vice presidential campaign lasted 7 days.

In December of that year, a "faithless elector" from Texas gave her one electoral vote for vice president.

== See also ==
- Republican Party presidential primaries, 2016
- Republican Party presidential candidates, 2016
- Ted Cruz presidential campaign, 2016
