= Ken Martin =

American politician (born 1973)

- Martin in 2017

Chair of the Democratic National Committee
- Incumbent
- Assumed office February 1, 2025
- Preceded by: Jaime Harrison

State Chair of the Minnesota Democratic–Farmer–Labor Party
- In office February 5, 2011 – March 29, 2025
- Preceded by: Brian Melendez
- Succeeded by: Richard Carlbom

Personal details
- Born: Kenneth Nathan Martin; July 17, 1973 (age 53) Minneapolis, Minnesota, U.S.
- Party: Democratic (DFL)
- Spouse: Jennifer O'Rourke
- Children: 2
- Education: University of Kansas (BA)

Kenneth Nathan Martin (born July 17, 1973) is an American politician serving since 2025 as chair of the Democratic National Committee (DNC). He was formerly state chair of the Minnesota Democratic–Farmer–Labor Party (DFL), president of the Association of State Democratic Committees, and vice chair of the DNC.

== Early life and education ==
Ken Martin was born in Minneapolis, Minnesota, on July 17, 1973, and attended Eden Prairie High School. He graduated from the University of Kansas in 1996 with a Bachelor of Arts in political science and history.

== Career ==
Martin started his political work in 1990 as an intern for U.S. Senator Paul Wellstone's campaign and later served as an intern for his Senate office. In 1992, Martin organized college campuses throughout the south for the Clinton/Gore campaign. After college, he worked in Kansas politics helping with the Kansas Democratic Coordinated Campaign as field director for the Kansas Democratic Party.

In 1998, Martin moved back to Minnesota and served as the political and field director for the Minnesota Democratic-Farmer-Labor (DFL) Party. He served as the deputy Minnesota state director for the Gore campaign in 2000 and in 2002 was the campaign manager for secretary of state candidate Buck Humphrey. In 2004, Martin worked on John Kerry's presidential campaign in Minnesota.

From 2001 to 2005, Martin served as the policy aide for Ramsey County commissioner Susan Haigh. He served as the executive assistant to Minnesota attorney general Mike Hatch and helped run his 2006 campaign for governor. Working with the North Central States Regional Council of Carpenters, he led an effort on behalf of the building trades to pass prevailing wage ordinances with local governments throughout Minnesota. In 2008, he led the campaign that passed the Clean Water, Land, and Legacy Amendment (Legacy Amendment) to the Minnesota Constitution. Martin later served as the executive director of WIN Minnesota, a donor collaborative that helped develop, fund, and direct independent expenditures during the 2010 election cycle. After the election, DFL gubernatorial nominee Mark Dayton chose Martin to direct Dayton's recount effort. The recount confirmed that Dayton had won the election.

In February 2011, Martin was unanimously elected State Chair of the Minnesota DFL. In 2017, his peers nationwide elected Martin president of the Association of State Democratic Committees, and he became a vice chair of the Democratic National Committee. On February 1, 2025, he was elected Democratic National Committee chair.

=== Minnesota DFL State Chair (2011–2025) ===
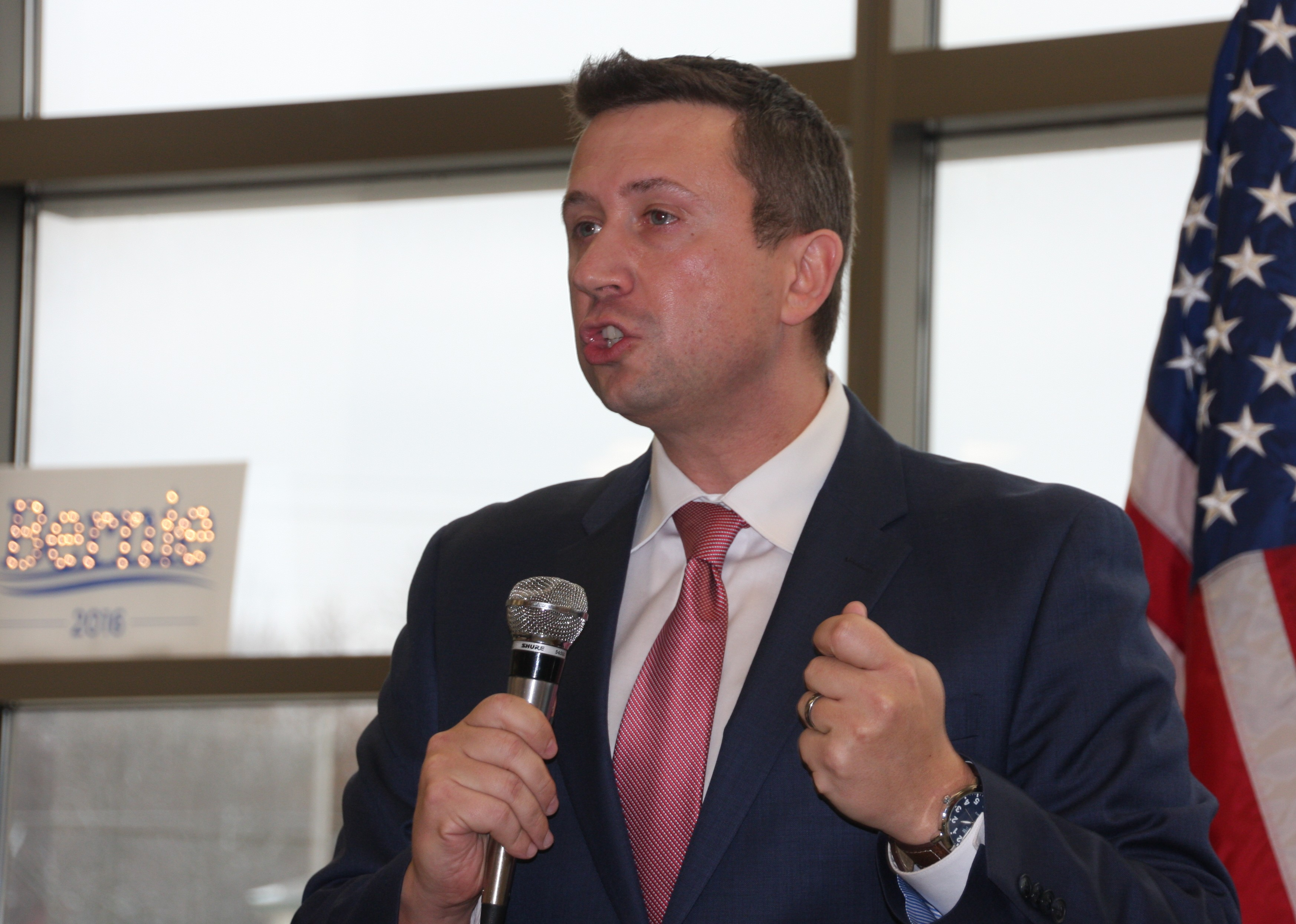
Martin in 2016

When Martin was elected State Chair of the Minnesota Democratic-Farmer-Labor Party (DFL) in 2011, he inherited a state party in debt after election losses, including losing the majority in the state senate for the first time in 40 years, the majority in the House of Representatives, and one of the longest-held Democratic seats in Congress with the defeat of Jim Oberstar in Minnesota's 8th congressional district.

In the 2012 Minnesota elections, the DFL regained majorities in both houses of the state legislature; Minnesota became the first state to defeat a constitutional amendment to ban same-sex marriage; a voter ID constitutional amendment was defeated; and DFL nominee Rick Nolan won in the 8th congressional district.

In 2014, Governor Dayton and U.S. Senator Al Franken were reelected. Each had first been elected by a margin of less than 1% of the vote.

In 2016, Minnesota was one of two midwestern states to vote for the Democratic presidential nominee, Hillary Clinton. In addition, despite losses of rural congressional seats throughout the country, the DFL won all three of its rural congressional races, reelecting Nolan, Tim Walz, and Collin Peterson.

In 2018, Walz was elected governor, marking the first time the DFL had had three consecutive terms in the governor's office. In addition, the DFL won every constitutional office; won back the majority in the State House of Representatives; flipped two congressional seats from red to blue, one of which had been held by Republicans for over 40 years; and elected two women to the U.S. Senate, Amy Klobuchar and Tina Smith, becoming only the fifth state to be represented by two women in the Senate simultaneously. Also in 2018, after trying for many years, Martin persuaded Dean Phillips to run for Congress in Minnesota's 3rd district. Phillips defeated the incumbent, Republican Erik Paulsen, and was reelected in 2020 and 2022.

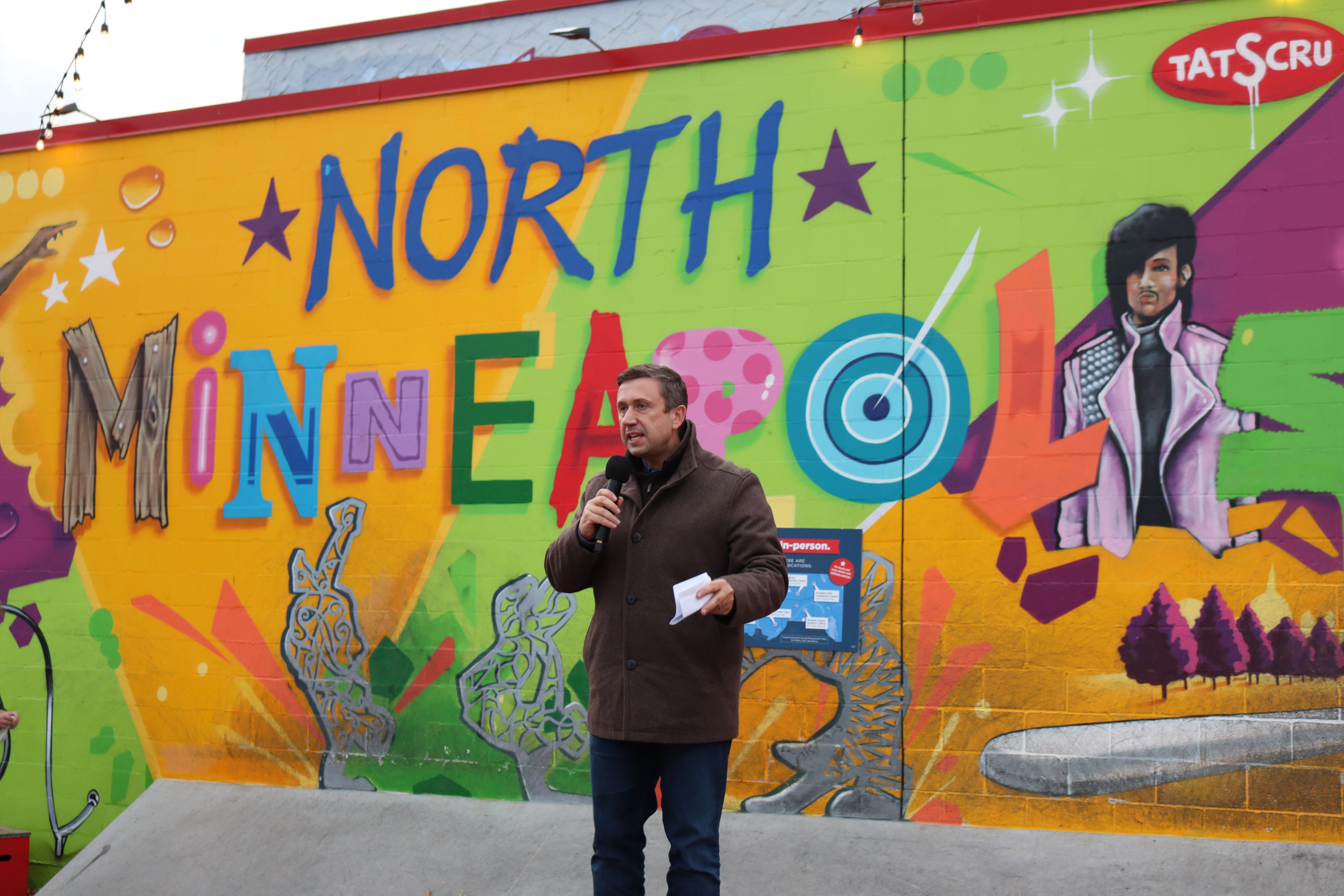
Martin in 2020

After coming within 1.5% of winning Minnesota in 2016, Donald Trump's campaign heavily invested in winning Minnesota in 2020. These investments included millions in advertising and over 60 campaign staffers. With the DFL's influence, Democratic nominee Joe Biden won Minnesota with 52.40% of the vote to Trump's 45.28%. Tina Smith was also reelected to the Senate, the DFL held the State House of Representatives and the two congressional seats the party flipped from red to blue in 2018, and it flipped three Republican-held state senate seats.

On February 6, 2021, Martin was elected to a sixth term as chairman of the DFL Party, making him the longest-serving chairman in the party's 75-year history. The Star Tribune noted that the DFL had recently seen many wins statewide and raised around three times as much money as the state Republican Party in his first 10 years as chair. By the time of Martin's reelection, the Minnesota DFL had $2.5 million in the bank compared to the Republicans' $55,000.

=== DNC vice chair (2017–2021) ===
In 2017, Martin was elected by his peers nationwide as president of the Association of State Democratic Chairs (ASDC), and thereby became a vice chair of the Democratic National Committee (DNC). On January 21, 2021, Martin was unanimously reelected president of the ASDC. Upon his reelection, Martin pledged to continue "our important work of strengthening Democratic infrastructure across America".

=== DNC chair (2025–present) ===
After Kamala Harris lost to Donald Trump in the 2024 United States presidential election, Martin announced his intention to run for chairman of the Democratic National Committee. Some press called him the front-runner in the race; during his campaign, Martin promised to focus on helping build the party's infrastructure across the country and U.S. territories, embarking on a "post-election review", bringing the party's message to new outlets, and going on offense against Trump and his policies. He was elected on February 1, 2025, receiving 246.5 votes out of 428 cast on the first ballot.

In February 2025, Martin published his first memorandum as DNC chair, "Democrats Will Fight Against Trump's War on Working People". It warned that most Americans see the Democratic Party as the "party of the elites" and the Republican Party as the "party of the working class". The memo highlighted the Democratic Party's agenda regarding labor and unions, Project 2025, Elon Musk, and Trump's labor policies and cabinet appointments. The same month, Martin started the "Organizing Everywhere" tour. Of the tour's purpose, he told NBC News: "It's time for the DNC to get out of D.C. That means getting out of our comfort zone, having tough but honest conversations with voters, and showing that we're willing to fight for people." He continued, "It's time for Democrats to show up in all 3,244 counties—red, purple, blue—to make our case." In an interview with The Nation, Martin said he was determined to increase the DNC's focus on raising money from small donors.

Around the 2024 election, Martin committed to publicly releasing a 2024 campaign post-mortem, which the DNC did not do after the 2016 election. He refused to release a 2024 campaign report in 2025 and 2026.

Martin's first months as DNC chair have been described as chaotic and plagued by infighting. Under his leadership, the party has seen a significant drop in donations. As of May, the Democratic Party had $18 million in funds, compared to $67 million held by the rival Republican National Committee. On November 12, 2025, he announced an end to the DNC's work-from-home policies, which the employee union sharply criticized.

After Democratic Party victories in the November 2025 elections, Martin emphasized that the party's "big tent" nature was an asset, making it a coalition of conservative, centrist, progressive, and leftist candidates. He also credited the campaigns of Zohran Mamdani, Abigail Spanberger, and Mikie Sherrill for their focus on affordability.

On May 21, 2026, Martin released the DNC autopsy of the 2024 campaign. Martin said the report did not live up to his standards or those of the DNC, and that the report was heavily annotated.

== Personal life ==
Martin lives in Eagan, Minnesota, with his wife, Jennifer O'Rourke, and their two sons. In 2017, he served on the Eagan Athletic Association board of directors and as president of the Eagan Basketball Association.

Party political offices
Preceded by Brian Melendez	Chair of the Minnesota Democratic–Farmer–Labor Party; 2011–2025	Succeeded by Richard Carlbom
Preceded by Jaime Harrison	Chair of the Democratic National Committee; 2025–present	Incumbent
