= Leon Lillie =

American politician

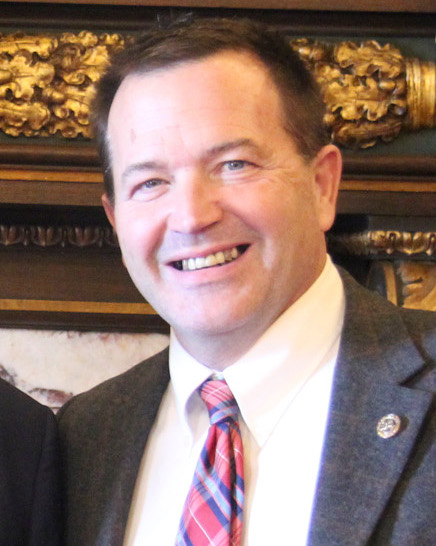

Member of the Minnesota House of Representatives from the 44B district
- Incumbent
- Assumed office January 4, 2005
- Preceded by: Scott Wasiluk

Personal details
- Born: June 1961 (age 65)
- Party: Democratic (DFL)
- Spouse: Missy
- Children: 3
- Education: University of Nottingham; Luther College (B.A.)
- Occupation: Airline employee; Legislator
- Website: Government website

Leon Michael Lillie (born June 1961) is an American politician serving in the Minnesota House of Representatives since 2005. A member of the Minnesota Democratic–Farmer–Labor Party (DFL), Lillie represents District 44B in the Twin Cities metropolitan area, which includes the cities of Oakdale, North St. Paul, and Maplewood and parts of Ramsey and Washington Counties.

== Early life, education and career ==
Lillie graduated from North High School in North Saint Paul, then attended the University of Nottingham in Nottingham, England, and Luther College in Decorah, Iowa, earning his B.S. in political science.

Lillie served on the North Saint Paul City Council from 1995 to 2004. When elected, he worked as a baggage handler and ramp agent for Northwest Airlines.

== Minnesota House of Representatives ==
Lillie was elected to the Minnesota House of Representatives in 2004 and has been reelected every two years since. He defeated two-term DFL incumbent Scott Wasiluk in a DFL primary after Wasiluk was caught on video drinking alcohol in his Capitol office.

Since 2019, Lillie has chaired the Legacy Finance Division, which oversees the allocation of proceeds from a state sales tax increase passed in 2008. Those funds are designated to protect drinking water and wildlife habitat and to preserve arts and cultural heritage. Lillie also sits on the Capital Investment, Rules and Legislative Administration, and Ways and Means Committees. He served as vice chair of the Commerce and Labor Committee from 2009 to 2010 and as an assistant majority leader for the House DFL caucus from 2013 to 2014.

=== Legacy amendment funds ===
Lillie has served on the Lessard-Sams Outdoor Heritage Council, which makes recommendations to the legislature on how Legacy Funds should be spent. In 2022, he authored legislation to spend $159 million from the Legacy Fund to restore and enhance natural areas. Lillie called the bill, which was the result of negotiations with the Republican Senate, "a little bit disappointing" and called for further investments in subsequent years.

=== Labor and union contracts ===
Lillie was a member of the Subcommittee on Employee Relations. In 2012, he criticized Republican members who voted to reject contracts for state employees containing a two percent pay raise. In 2017, he voted to accept union contracts with MAPE and AFSCME, but was outvoted by Republicans. Lillie spoke out against Republican plans to cut legislative staff in 2015, calling it "really not Minnesotan", and has opposed efforts to make union dues voluntary. In 2020, he supported state workers' union contracts that included what he called "reasonable" salary increases.

=== Other political positions ===
Lillie co-authored legislation to build a new Minnesota Vikings stadium, to be paid for in part by a local sales tax. He voted for the final bill authorizing construction of the stadium.

== Electoral history ==
2004 Minnesota State House - District 55A
Party	Candidate	Votes	%
Democratic (DFL)	Leon Lillie	10,849	54.79
Republican	Jan Steiner	7,673	38.75
Independence	Brian D. Balfanz	1,250	6.31
Write-in		28	0.14
Total votes		19,800	100.0
Democratic (DFL) hold			

2006 Minnesota State House - District 55A
Party	Candidate	Votes	%
Democratic (DFL)	Leon Lillie (incumbent)	10,123	66.58
Republican	Tim Kinley	5,059	33.27
Write-in		23	0.15
Total votes		15,205	100.0
Democratic (DFL) hold			

2008 Minnesota State House - District 55A
Party	Candidate	Votes	%
Democratic (DFL)	Leon Lillie (incumbent)	11,749	59.96
Republican	Christine Jacobson	5,961	30.42
Independence	Bob Zick	1,862	9.50
Write-in		23	0.12
Total votes		19,595	100.0
Democratic (DFL) hold			

2010 Minnesota State House - District 55A
Party	Candidate	Votes	%
Democratic (DFL)	Leon Lillie (incumbent)	7,810	56.24
Republican	Nathan M. Hansen	5,136	36.98
Independence	Joseph Polencheck	930	6.70
Write-in		12	0.09
Total votes		13,888	100.0
Democratic (DFL) hold			

2012 Minnesota State House - District 43B
Party	Candidate	Votes	%
Democratic (DFL)	Leon Lillie (incumbent)	12,445	60.42
Republican	Kevin J. Klein	8,111	39.38
Write-in		40	0.19
Total votes		20,596	100.0
Democratic (DFL) hold			

2014 Minnesota State House - District 43B
Party	Candidate	Votes	%
Democratic (DFL)	Leon Lillie (incumbent)	7,891	58.08
Republican	Justice B. Whitethorn	5,672	41.75
Write-in		23	0.17
Total votes		13,586	100.0
Democratic (DFL) hold			

2016 Minnesota State House - District 43B
Party	Candidate	Votes	%
Democratic (DFL)	Leon Lillie (incumbent)	12,017	59.52
Republican	Nathan Hansen	8,123	40.23
Write-in		49	0.24
Total votes		20,189	100.0
Democratic (DFL) hold			

2018 Minnesota State House - District 43B
Party	Candidate	Votes	%
Democratic (DFL)	Leon Lillie (incumbent)	11,253	62.31
Republican	Rachael Bucholz	6,788	37.59
Write-in		19	0.11
Total votes		18,060	100.0
Democratic (DFL) hold			

2020 Minnesota State House - District 43B
Party	Candidate	Votes	%
Democratic (DFL)	Leon Lillie (incumbent)	12,651	56.70
Republican	Jordan Herzog	8,330	37.33
Veterans Party - Minnesota	Antonio Nerios	1,309	5.87
Write-in		22	0.10
Total votes		22,312	100.0
Democratic (DFL) hold			

2022 Minnesota State House - District 44B
Party	Candidate	Votes	%
Democratic (DFL)	Leon Lillie (incumbent)	9,197	56.60
Republican	William Johnston	6,260	38.52
Libertarian	TJ Hawthorne	785	4.83
Write-in		8	0.05
Total votes		16,250	100.0
Democratic (DFL) hold			

== Personal life ==
Lillie is married and has three children. His brother, Ted Lillie, a Republican, was a member of the Minnesota Senate from 2011 to 2012. He is Lutheran.
