= 2002 Minnesota Secretary of State election =

- November 5, 2002
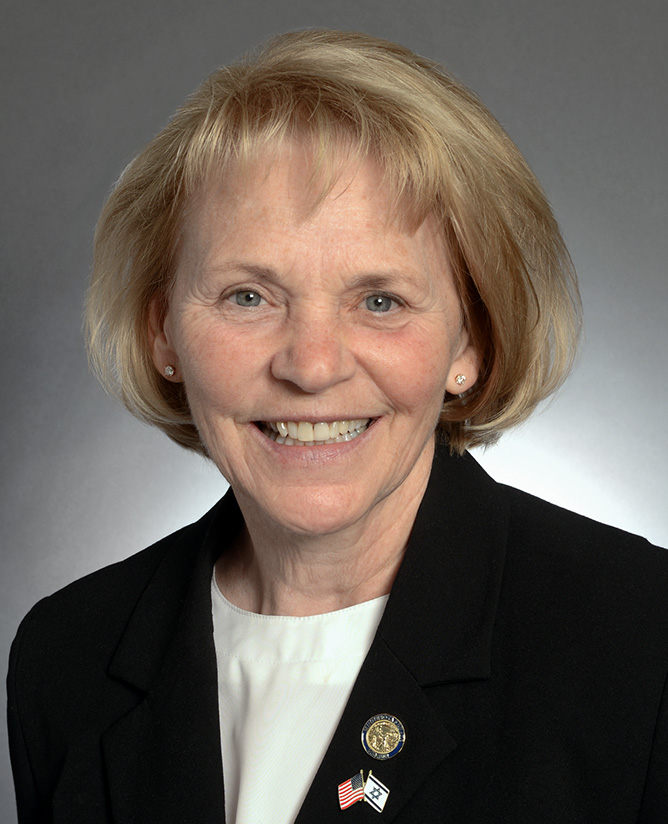

Nominee	Mary Kiffmeyer	Buck Humphrey
Party	Republican	Democratic (DFL)
Popular vote	1,040,739	974,045
Percentage	47.56%	44.51%
- County results Kiffmeyer: 40–50% 50–60% 60–70% Humphrey: 40–50% 50–60% 60–70%
Secretary of State before election
Mary Kiffmeyer
Republican
Elected Secretary of State
Mary Kiffmeyer
Republican

The 2002 Minnesota Secretary of State election was held on November 5, 2002, in order to elect the Secretary of State of Minnesota. Republican nominee and incumbent Secretary of State Mary Kiffmeyer defeated Democratic–Farmer–Labor nominee Hubert Horatio Humphrey IV, Independence nominee Dean Alger and Green nominee Andrew S. Koebrick. As of 2026, this is the last time a Republican was elected Minnesota Secretary of State as well as the last time that a woman was elected Minnesota Secretary of State.

== Primary elections ==
Each candidate was their respective party's sole nominee and so won their primaries uncontested on September 10, 2002.

== General election ==
On election day, November 5, 2002, Republican nominee Mary Kiffmeyer won re-election by a margin of 66,694 votes against her foremost opponent Democratic–Farmer–Labor nominee Hubert Horatio Humphrey IV, thereby retaining Republican control over the office of Secretary of State. Kiffmeyer was sworn in for her second term on January 3, 2003.

=== Results ===
Minnesota Secretary of State election, 2002
Party	Candidate	Votes	%
Republican	Mary Kiffmeyer (incumbent)	1,040,739	47.56
Democratic (DFL)	Hubert Horatio Humphrey IV	974,045	44.51
Independence	Dean Alger	104,799	4.79
Green	Andrew S. Koebrick	67,404	3.08
Write-in		1,253	0.06
Total votes		2,188,240	100.00
Republican hold			
