= Peggy McCarthy =

Peggy McCarthy may refer to:

- Peggy McCarthy (rower)
- Peggy McCarthy (politician)
