= Eric Stohl =

American politician

Member of the New Hampshire House of Representatives
- In office 2000–2010
- Constituency: Coos 1

Personal details
- Party: Republican

Eric Stohl is an American politician from New Hampshire. He served in the New Hampshire House of Representatives.

Stohl was appointed as a member of the New Hampshire Fish and Game Commission.

Stohl endorsed the Nikki Haley 2024 presidential campaign. Stohl endorsed the Carly Fiorina 2016 presidential campaign.
