= Jeff Smith (Iowa politician) =

American politician

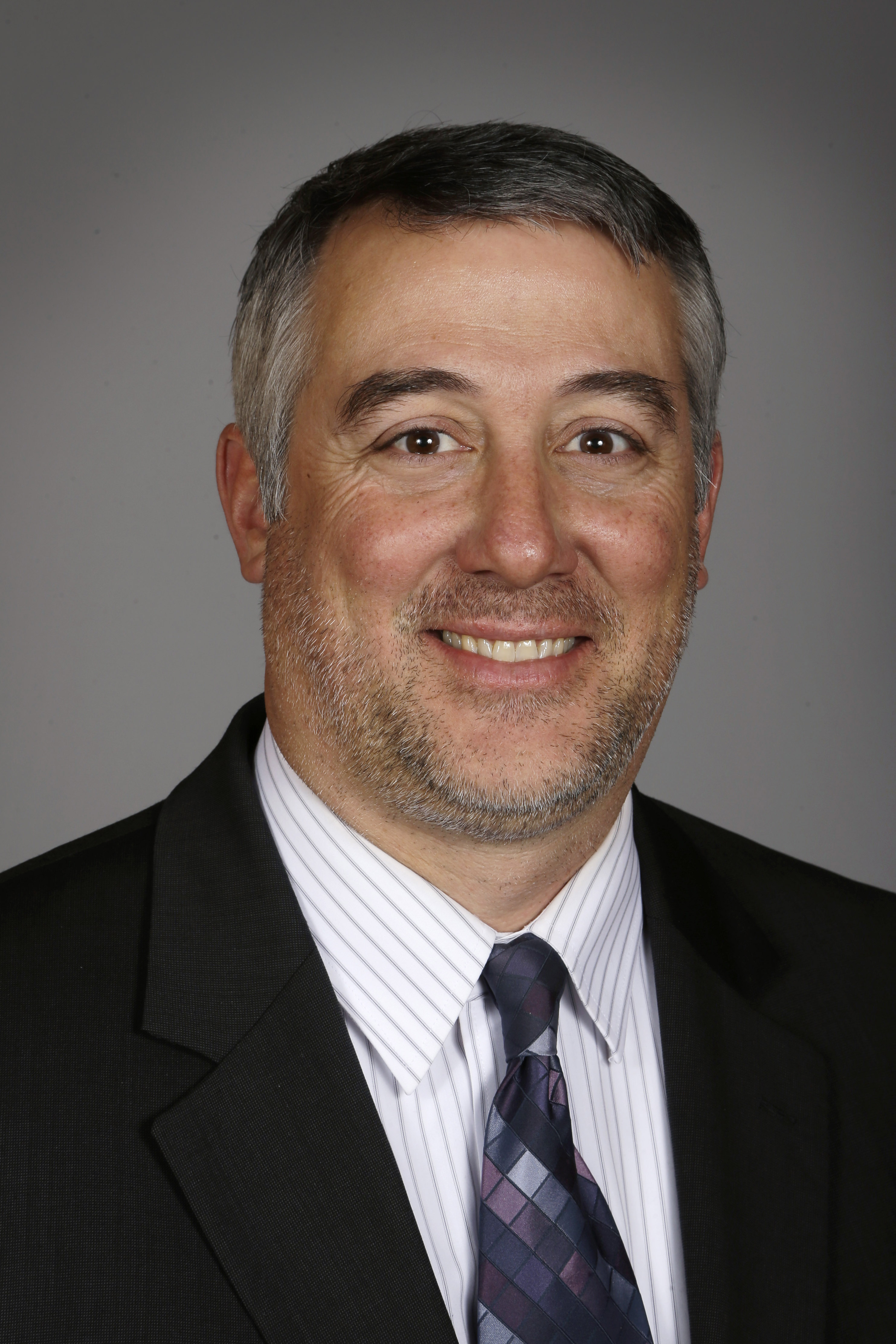

Member of the Iowa House of Representatives from the 1st district 6th (2011 – 2013)
- Incumbent
- Assumed office January 10, 2011
- Preceded by: Mike May

Personal details
- Born: July 23, 1967 (age 59) Plover, Iowa
- Party: Republican
- Spouse: Julie
- Children: 2 children
- Education: Iowa State University
- Profession: Banker (retired)
- Website: Smith's website

Jeff Smith (born 1967) is the Iowa State Representative from the 1st District. A Republican, he has served in the Iowa House of Representatives since 2011. Smith was born in Plover, Iowa. He has a bachelor's degree in public service and administration from Iowa State University.

As of January 2013, Smith serves on several committees in the Iowa House - the Administration and Rules, Commerce, Environmental Protection, and Natural Resources committees. He is an Assistant Leader and also serves as the chair of the Ethics committee.

== Biography ==
Jeff was born June 23, 1967, to Garth and Marilynn Smith of Plover, Iowa. Jeff has one sister, who lives in Aurora, Colorado and one brother, who lives in Levelland, Texas.

He grew up on his family farm in Plover, Iowa and graduated from Havelock-Plover High School in 1986. Following high school, he attended Iowa State University where he received his Bachelor of Science degree in Public Service and Administration in Agriculture in 1991. After graduation, Jeff returned to work for his family's farming operation where he raised corn and soybeans and managed a feeder pig operation. In 1994 Jeff moved to Spirit Lake where he worked for First Bank and Trust as a farm and commercial lender and branch manager.

Jeff is a member of the Spirit Lake United Methodist Church, where he has served as the Finance Committee Chairman. He is a member and past President of the Spirit Lake Noon Kiwanis, a former co-chair of the University of Okoboji Winter Games, and a previous local director of the Midwest Youth Football League. Jeff has also served on the board of directors for the Spirit Lake Mainsail Chamber of Commerce, the Iowa Bankers Association Ag Committee, the City of Spirit Lake Zoning Board, and the Spirit Lake Youth Athletic Association.

== Electoral history ==
*incumbent

Election	Political result	Candidate	Party	Votes	%
Iowa House of Representatives primary elections, 2010; District 6 Turnout: 3,022	Republican	Jeff Smith	Republican	1,411	46.69%
Iowa House of Representatives primary elections, 2010; District 6 Turnout: 3,022	Republican	Zach Whiting	Republican	1,356	44.87%
Iowa House of Representatives general elections, 2010; District 6	Republican hold	Jeff Smith	Republican	unopposed	
Iowa House of Representatives primary elections, 2012; District 1 Turnout: 6,419	Republican	Jeff Smith*	Republican	3,263	50.83%
Iowa House of Representatives primary elections, 2012; District 1 Turnout: 6,419	Republican	Kevin Wolfswinkel	Republican	2,723	42.42%
Iowa House of Representatives general elections, 2012; District 1	Republican (newly redistricted)	Jeff Smith*	Republican	unopposed	

Iowa House of Representatives
Preceded by Mike May	6th District; 2011 – 2013	Succeeded by Ron Jorgensen
Preceded by Jeremy Taylor	1st District; 2013 – present	Succeeded by Incumbent
