= Ron Jorgensen =

American politician (born 1957)

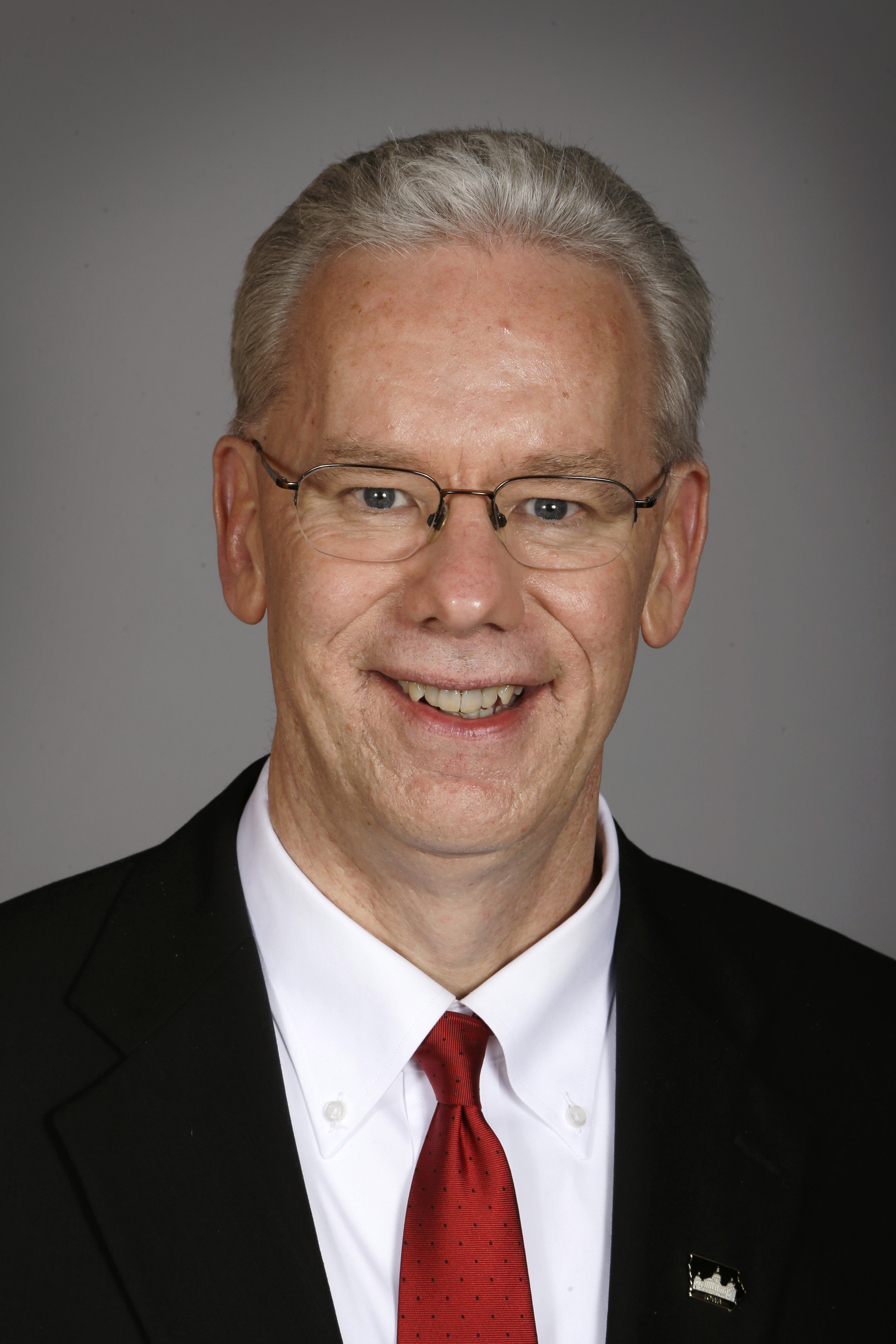

Member of the Iowa House of Representatives from the 6th district 54th (2011–2013)
- In office January 10, 2011 – January 8, 2017
- Preceded by: Christopher Rants
- Succeeded by: Jim Carlin

Personal details
- Born: May 17, 1957 (age 69) Sioux City, Iowa, U.S.
- Party: Republican
- Spouse: Kathy
- Children: 2 children
- Education: Morningside College; University of South Dakota
- Profession: Business and Finance
- Website: legis.iowa.gov/...

Ron Jorgensen (born May 17, 1957) is the Iowa State Representative from the 6th District. A Republican, he has served in the Iowa House of Representatives since 2011. Smith was born in Sioux City, Iowa, United States. He has a B.S. in business administration from Morningside College and an M.B.A. from the University of South Dakota. Jorgensen works as Vice President for Business and Finance at Morningside College.

As of January 2013, Jorgensen serves on several committees in the Iowa House – the Economic Growth, Labor, and Transportation committees. He also serves as the chair of the Education committee and as a member of the Education Appropriations Subcommittee.

== Biography ==
Ron Jorgensen has been a lifelong resident of Sioux City and the Morningside area. He graduated from East High School in 1975 and then received a bachelor's degree in Business Administration from Morningside College in 1979. Jorgensen also earned a Masters of Business Administration Degree from the University of South Dakota and is a Certified Management Accountant and Certified Cash Manager.

For the past 14 years, Jorgensen has been the Vice President for Business and Finance at Morningside College. Prior to working at the college he was a Vice President and Chief Financial Officer for a local bank in Sioux City. Jorgensen served on the Sioux City School Board for six years, two of those years as board president. He has also served on numerous other local non-profit boards.

Jorgensen has been married to his wife, Kathy, for the last 30 years. They have two sons, Corey, 26, and Eric, 21. His family are members of the Morningside Lutheran Church.

== Electoral history ==
*incumbent

Election	Political result	Candidate	Party	Votes	%
Iowa House of Representatives primary elections, 2010; District 54	Republican	Ron Jorgensen	Republican	unopposed	
Iowa House of Representatives general elections, 2010; District 54; Turnout: 9,761	Republican hold	Ron Jorgensen	Republican	6,345	65.00%
Iowa House of Representatives general elections, 2010; District 54; Turnout: 9,761	Republican hold	Carlos Venable-Ridley	Democratic	3,136	32.13%
Iowa House of Representatives primary elections, 2012; District 6 Turnout: 2,374	Republican	Ron Jorgensen*	Republican	1,288	54.25%
Iowa House of Representatives primary elections, 2012; District 6 Turnout: 2,374	Republican	Matthew A. Ung	Republican	1,017	42.84%
Iowa House of Representatives general elections, 2012; District 6	Republican (newly redistricted)	Ron Jorgensen*	Republican	unopposed	

Iowa House of Representatives
Preceded by Christopher Rants	54th District; 2011–2013	Succeeded by Linda Upmeyer
Preceded by Jeff Smith	6th District; 2013–present	Succeeded by Incumbent
