= Warren Limmer =

American politician (born 1955)

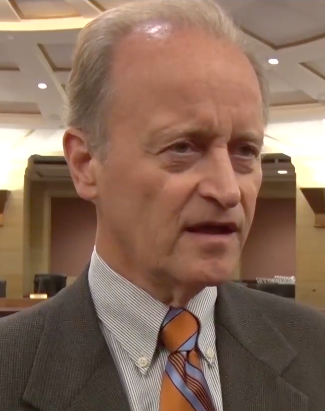

Member of the Minnesota Senate from the 37th district
- Incumbent
- Assumed office February 13, 1995
- Preceded by: Pat McGowan

President pro tempore of the Minnesota Senate
- In office January 3, 2017 – January 7, 2019
- Preceded by: Ann Rest
- Succeeded by: Mary Kiffmeyer

Member of the Minnesota House of Representatives from the 33B district 48A (1989–1993)
- In office January 3, 1989 – February 13, 1995
- Preceded by: Dale Clausnitzer
- Succeeded by: Rich Stanek

Personal details
- Born: January 24, 1955 (age 71) Sioux Falls, South Dakota, U.S.
- Party: Republican
- Spouse: Lori
- Children: 3
- Education: North Hennepin Community College; St. Cloud State University (BA)

Warren E. Limmer (born January 24, 1955) is a Minnesota politician and member of the Minnesota Senate. A member of the Republican Party of Minnesota, he represents the 37th District, which includes portions of Hennepin County in the northwestern Twin Cities metropolitan area. Limmer previously served in the Minnesota House of Representatives, and in 1998 he sought the Republican endorsement for Minnesota Secretary of State, losing to Mary Kiffmeyer. He was the author of the 2012 Minnesota constitutional amendment to ban gay marriage.

== Early life, education, and career ==
Limmer attended North Hennepin Community College, where he received an A.A., and St. Cloud State University, where he received a B.A. in criminal justice studies. He worked as a corrections officer before serving in the legislature. Limmer is a former member of the Hennepin County Corrections Advisory Commission and the Crystal Human Rights Commission. He now works as a real estate agent.

== Minnesota Legislature ==
Before being elected to the Minnesota Senate, Limmer was a member of the Minnesota House of Representatives, first elected in 1988 in the old House District 48A, and reelected in 1990, 1992 and 1994. After the 1992 redistricting, the area became House District 33B.

Limmer was first elected to the Senate in a February 1995 special election held after Senator Patrick McGowan resigned upon being elected Hennepin County Sheriff. He has been continuously reelected ever since. Limmer has held multiple leadership positions, including assistant minority leader, assistant majority leader, and chair of the Judiciary and Public Safety Finance and Policy Committee. His special legislative concerns include criminal justice, public education, safe school legislation, economic development, and tax reform.

On April 27, 2011, Limmer introduced a bill to propose a referendum on an amendment to the Minnesota Constitution banning same-sex marriage. The bill passed, but voters rejected the amendment in the 2012 election by six percentage points.

In the next legislative session, Senator Scott Dibble and Representative Karen Clark introduced bills to legalize same-sex marriage in Minnesota. The Minnesota House of Representatives voted 75–59 in favor of legalization. A few days later, after debate on the Senate floor, the body also voted for legalization, 37–30. On May 14, 2013, in front of a crowd of 7,000 on the Capitol Mall in St. Paul, Governor Mark Dayton signed Dibble's and Clark's marriage equality bill into law, making Minnesota the 12th state to legalize gay marriage.

Limmer opposes universal background checks for gun purchases. As chair of the Senate Judiciary's public safety committee, he has refused to allow any hearings on gun safety.

== Personal life ==
Limmer and his wife Lori live in Maple Grove and have three children.

Minnesota Senate
Preceded by Ann Rest	President pro tempore of the Minnesota Senate; 2017–2019	Succeeded by Mary Kiffmeyer
Political offices
Preceded by Michelle Fischbach	President of the Minnesota Senate; Acting; 2018–2019	Succeeded by Jeremy Miller
