= Kathy Saltzman =

American politician

Member of the Minnesota Senate from the 56th district
- In office January 3, 2007 – January 3, 2011
- Preceded by: Brian LeClair
- Succeeded by: Ted Lillie

Personal details
- Born: June 4, 1955 (age 71) Illinois, U.S.
- Party: Minnesota Democratic-Farmer-Labor Party
- Spouse: Ted Saltzman
- Children: 2
- Education: University of Iowa
- Occupation: Education advocate, legislator

Kathy L. Saltzman (born June 4, 1955) is a Minnesota politician and a former member of the Minnesota Senate who represented District 56, which includes portions of Washington County in the eastern Twin Cities metropolitan area. A moderate Democrat, she was first elected to the Senate in 2006, but was unseated by Republican Ted Lillie in her 2010 re-election bid. She was the majority whip.

Saltzman was a member of the Senate's Business, Industry and Jobs Committee (of which she was vice chair), the Education Committee, and the Transportation Committee. She also chaired the Education Committee's Subcommittee on Charter Schools, serves on the Business, Industry and Jobs subcommittees for Bioscience and Renewable Energy Development, and for Workforce Development (which she chaired), and on the Finance subcommittees for the E-12 Education Budget and Policy Division, the Transportation Budget and Policy Division, and the Transportation Budget and Policy Division-Transit Subdivision. Her special legislative concerns include education, property tax reform, health care, economic competitiveness, transportation, and water quality.

Saltzman graduated from St. Charles High School in St. Charles, Illinois, then went on to the University of Iowa, where she received her B.S. degree. She was previously the communications director for Schools for Equity in Education (SEE), working with school districts and parents throughout Minnesota on education funding issues, and also worked as an outreach and marketing employee for the University of Minnesota Hospital and Clinics. In 1994, she was appointed by former Saint Paul mayor Norm Coleman to serve in his Office of Children and Families. She is also active in various community boards and associations.
