= Ralph Kiffmeyer =

American politician

Ralph Robert Kiffmeyer (born November 23, 1945) is a nurse anesthetist who served in the Minnesota House of Representatives from January 8, 1985, to January 5, 1987. He was elected as a Republican and represented parts of Benton and Sherburne counties. He was defeated in his bid for re-election by Democrat Jerry Bauerly. He is married to former Minnesota Secretary of State and current state senator Mary Kiffmeyer. They live near Big Lake, Minnesota.
