= Ted Lillie =

American politician

Member of the Minnesota Senate from the 56th district
- In office January 4, 2011 – January 7, 2013
- Preceded by: Kathy Saltzman
- Succeeded by: Susan Kent

Personal details
- Born: December 30, 1956 (age 69)
- Party: Republican Party of Minnesota
- Spouse: Dr. Lynne Lillie
- Children: 2
- Education: Gustavus Adolphus College
- Occupation: Newspaper publisher, legislator

Theodore H. "Ted" Lillie (born December 30, 1956) is an American politician and a former member of the Minnesota Senate who represented District 56, which included portions of Washington County in the eastern Twin Cities metropolitan area. A Republican, he and his cousin are the co-publishers of Lillie Suburban Newspapers.

Lillie was first elected in 2010. He was one of four assistant majority leaders, and was a member of the Jobs and Economic Growth, the State Government Innovation and Veterans, and the Transportation committees. The 2012 legislative redistricting changed Lillie's Senate District from 56 to 53. He lost his bid for reelection in 2012 to DFLer Susan Kent. His brother, Leon, is a Democratic member of the Minnesota House of Representatives. He was named President of the Taxpayers League of Minnesota in September, 2013.

Lillie graduated from Gustavus Adolphus College in St. Peter. Active in the eastern Twin Cities community through the years, he serves on the board of directors of the Healtheast Foundation, the Oakdale Business and Professional Association, Platinum Bank, and the Co-Action Academic Resources Foundation, an organization providing scholarship opportunities for post-secondary education to residents of North St. Paul, Maplewood, Oakdale, Lake Elmo and Woodbury. He has also served on the board of the Saint Paul Area Chamber of Commerce, the School District 622 Education Foundation, the Thrive Youth Asset Building Initiative, the Boy Scouts Gateway District, and the School to Careers Local Council.
