= Brian LeClair =

American politician

Member of the Minnesota Senate from the 56th district
- In office January 7, 2003 – January 2, 2007
- Preceded by: Michele Bachmann
- Succeeded by: Kathy Saltzman

Personal details
- Born: October 17, 1968 Saint Paul, Minnesota, U.S.
- Party: Republican
- Education: University of Wisconsin-Madison; Hofstra University; American College
- Occupation: attorney, business owner, legislator

Brian LeClair (born October 17, 1968) is a Minnesota politician and former member of the Minnesota Senate. A Republican, he was elected in 2002, and served one term representing District 56. He was defeated for reelection in 2006 by Democrat Kathy Saltzman. In the 2010 general election he ran unsuccessfully for district judge in Minnesota's 10th Judicial District, one of 24 candidates to do so.

LeClair served as Health Policy Advisor to former Governor Tim Pawlenty. He is the vice president of LeClair Insurance in Saint Paul.

LeClair earned a B.S. degree from the University of Wisconsin in Madison and an M.B.A and J.D. from Hofstra University. He also holds the CLU and ChFC designations from the American College in Bryn Mawr, Pennsylvania. His writings have appeared in The New York Times and Forbes magazine.

Preceded by Michele Bachmann	Minnesota State Senator - 56th District; 2003 – 2007	Succeeded by Kathy Saltzman
