= Christopher Rants =

American politician (born 1967)

Christopher C. Rants
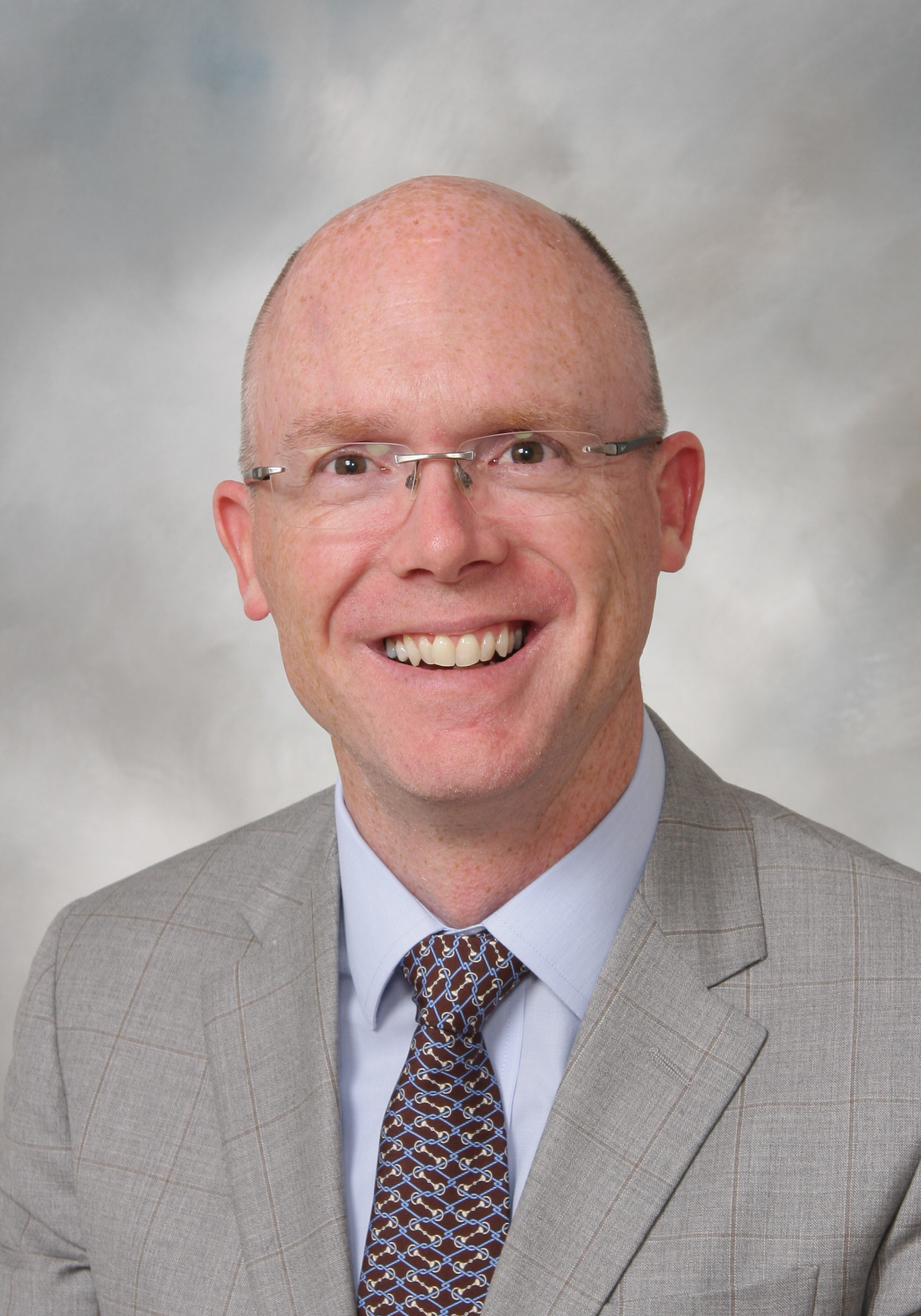

Speaker of the House

Member of the Iowa House of Representatives from the 54th district
- In office 1992–2011
- Preceded by: Don Shoning
- Succeeded by: Ron Jorgensen

Personal details
- Born: September 16, 1967 (age 59) Grosse Pointe, Michigan, U.S.
- Party: Republican
- Spouse: Trudy Rants
- Children: Grace and Katharine Rants
- Education: Morningside College
- Occupation: Consultant
- Website: Rants' website

Christopher C. Rants (born September 16, 1967) is a former Iowa State Representative. He served in the Iowa House of Representatives from 1992 to 2010. He received his BA from Morningside College. His work experience includes managing environmental compliance projects for Metz Baking Company, and Pierce & Associates, a Sioux City consulting firm. After leaving the legislature, Rants started inSight Communication as government affairs and public relations firm. In 2015 Rants partnered his firm with PolicyWorks LLC, another Iowa government affairs firm.

Rants served on several committees in the Iowa House - Commerce, Education, Ways & Means, Labor, and Rules committees. His political experience includes serving as Assistant Majority Leader beginning in 1994, serving as the Speaker Pro Tempore, serving as House Majority Leader beginning in 1999, and serving as Speaker of the Iowa House from 2003 through 2006.

Rants was re-elected in 2008 by a margin of 57% to 43%.

In June 2009, Rants announced his intention to seek his party's nomination for the 2010 election for Governor of Iowa. Rants announced that he was pulling out of the race for governor in February 2010.

In 2006 and 2008 Rants backed Mitt Romney in the Iowa caucuses, and in 2016 Rants was the state chairman for the Carly Fiorina for president campaign.

Christopher is an Aspen Institute Rodel Fellow in Public Leadership. Rants serves as Vice Chairman of the Republican State Leadership Committee.

Rants is an avid golfer, who has played the 2004 Golf Magazine's Top 100 Public Courses You Can Play.

Iowa House of Representatives
Preceded by Don Shoning	3rd District; 1992 – 2002	Succeeded by Ralph Klemme
Preceded by Todd Taylor	54th District; 2002 – present	Succeeded by Incumbent
