= Richard Carlbom =

Minnesota politician (born 1981)

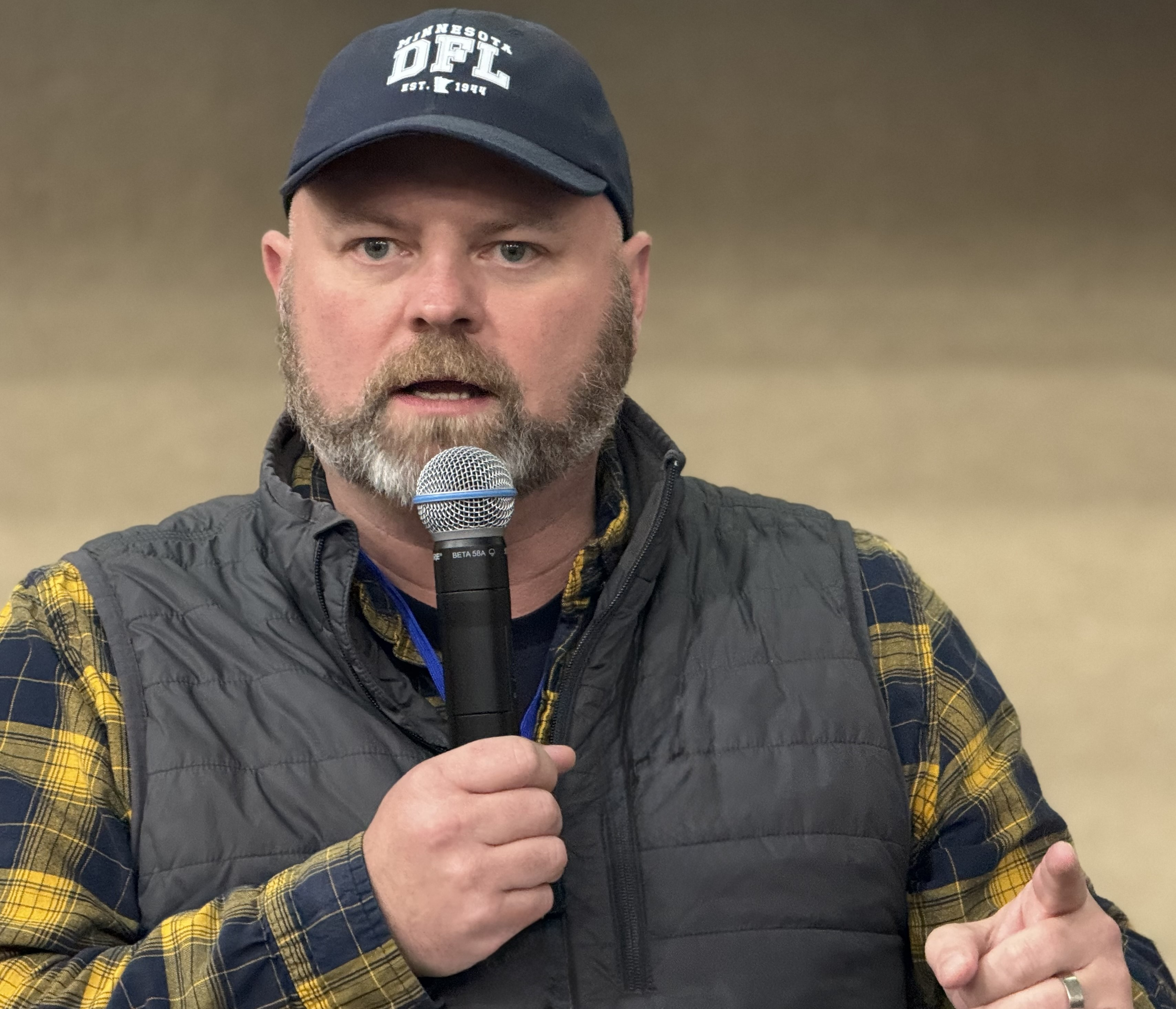
- Carlbom in 2026

Chair of the Minnesota Democratic–Farmer–Labor Party
- Incumbent
- Assumed office March 29, 2025
- Preceded by: Ken Martin

Personal details
- Born: August 4, 1981 (age 44)
- Party: Democratic
- Spouse: Justin Schramm
- Education: Saint John's University (BS)

Richard Carlbom (born August 4, 1981) is an American politician serving since 2025 as the chair of the Minnesota Democratic-Farmer-Labor Party. The former mayor of St. Joseph and a onetime campaign manager for Tim Walz, he rose to statewide prominence when he led the campaign to legalize same-sex marriage in Minnesota from 2011 to 2013.

== Early life and education ==
Carlbom graduated from Saint John's University with a bachelor's degree in political science in 2004.

== Career ==
=== Mayor of Saint Joseph ===
At 23 years old, a few months after his graduation from Saint John's, Carlbom was elected mayor of Saint Joseph, Minnesota in 2004. He served for 2 years and resigned five months into his second term to work for Tim Walz, then the representative for Minnesota's 1st congressional district in the United States House of Representatives.

=== Walz congressional campaign ===
Carlbom found a career in campaigns and communications following his time as mayor. He worked with Walz's 2008 and 2010 campaigns, serving as his campaign manager in 2010. Following that campaign work, was the Communications Director for Saint Paul mayor Chris Coleman.

=== Same-sex marriage activism ===
In 2011, both houses of the Minnesota Legislature passed a bill introducing a ballot measure for a constitutional amendment that would have outlawed same-sex marriage in Minnesota. Shortly thereafter, Minnesota LGBTQ+ rights organizations OutFront Minnesota and Project 515 formed Minnesotans United for All Families, a campaign against the amendment. Carlbom, who was engaged to his now-husband two weeks before the amendment made it through the legislature, was selected to chair the campaign. The "Vote No" campaign was successful: voters rejected the amendment with a 51% majority.

After the marriage ban passed, Carlbom began work with Minnesotans United on legislation to legalize same-sex marriage in the Minnesota Legislature. The organization spent $2 million lobbying for the bill, which was sponsored by Scott Dibble (DFL) in the Senate and Karen Clark in the House. The bill passed in both houses and was signed into law by Governor Mark Dayton on March 14, 2013.

Following his work in Minnesota, Carlbom became the director of state campaigns for the nonprofit Freedom to Marry.

=== Deputy Chief of Staff for Governor Tim Walz ===
In 2023, Carlbom was hired as the deputy chief of staff for Minnesota governor Tim Walz.

=== Democratic-Farmer-Labor party chair ===
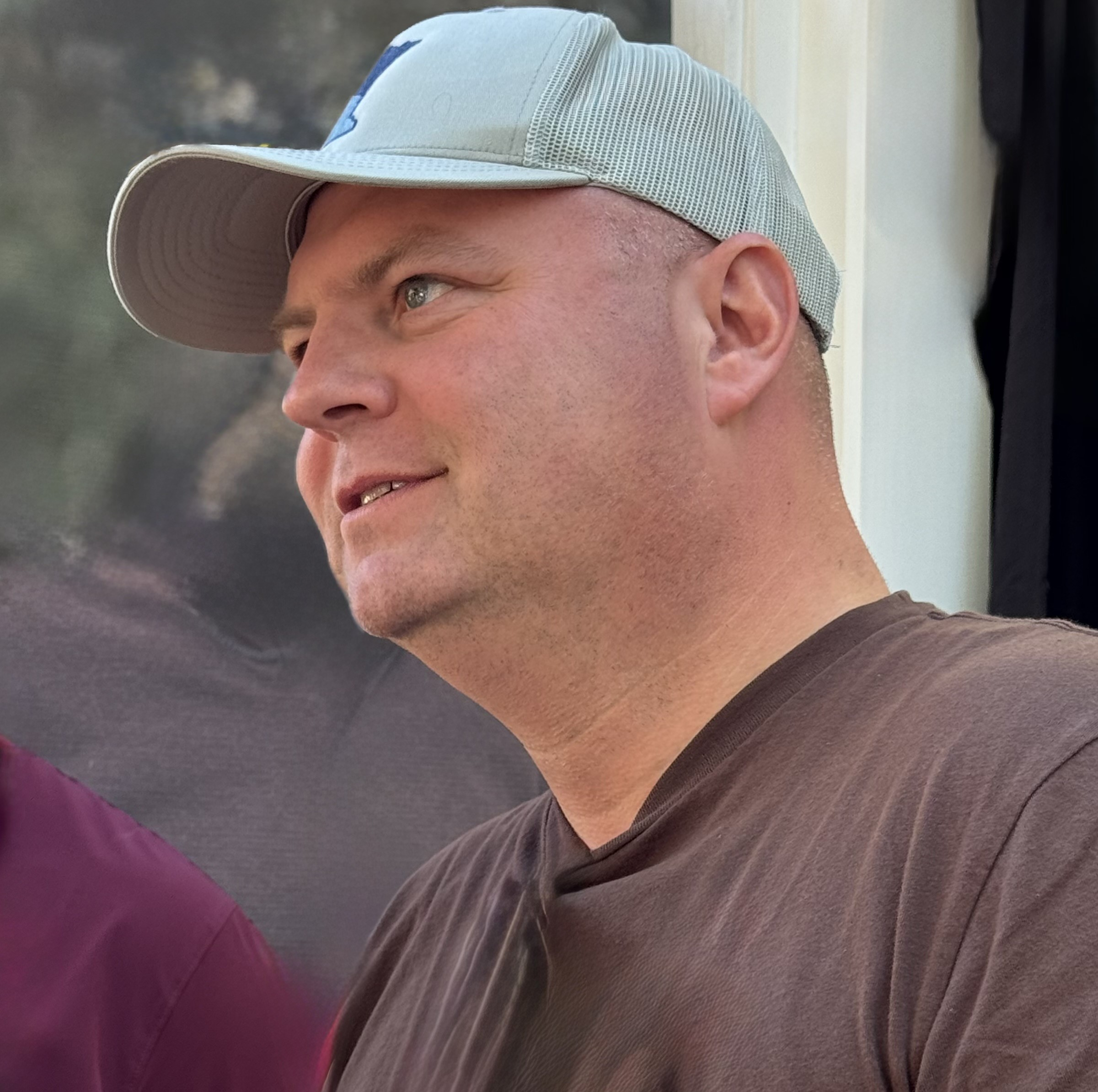
Carlbom in 2025

On March 29, 2025, Carlbom was elected chair of the Minnesota Democratic-Farmer-Labor Party to succeed Ken Martin, who resigned after his election as chair of the Democratic National Committee.

== Personal life ==
Carlbom has been married to Justin Schramm, a teacher, since 2013.

Party political offices
Preceded by Ken Martin	Chair of the Minnesota Democratic–Farmer–Labor Party; 2025–present	Incumbent
