= David Strom =

American radio personality

David M. Strom (born 1964) is a Conservative in Minnesota.

== Personal ==
Strom graduated from Carleton College (1987) in Northfield, Minnesota, with a degree in political science and he holds a master's degree in political science from Duke University (1992). He has taught political philosophy at Duke University, North Carolina State University, Carleton College, and the University of St. Thomas.

== Public ==
Strom hosted a weekly radio show on WWTC's "AM 1280 The Patriot" called "The David Strom Show" which was part of a live, local Saturday lineup including The Northern Alliance Radio Network.

He was a nearly regular, bi-weekly, contributor to the local ABC affiliate's Sunday morning news program At Issue 3-5 minute "face-off" segment in which he sparred with an opponent of an opposing political view. David served as President of the Taxpayers League of Minnesota.

He was a Senior Policy Fellow and past president of the Minnesota Free Market Institute and he served as executive director, then research director of the Minnesota Conservative Energy Forum.

Strom was a research director on campaigns for several Republican candidates for Governor, US Senate and Congress.

Strom is a Fellow at the Claremont Institute and is a senior fellow at the Center of the American Experiment.

== Recognition ==
In 2004, when he was still President of the Taxpayers League of Minnesota, Strom was named Minnesota's “Best Villain” by City Pages, an alternative weekly newspaper based in Minneapolis.

His small government conservatism is partly expressed in this quote:

"Government tries to replace the family, the church, the neighborhood, the community with a benevolent bureaucracy. The benevolent bureaucracy cannot do what [civil society] can do, but it has pushed civil society aside. It's said, 'This is our problem. Just go away. By the way, go work some more so that we can do more of this.'
