= 2012 Minnesota Amendment 1 =

Minnesota Amendment 1
- November 6, 2012
- Minnesota Marriage Amendment

Results
Choice	Votes	%
Yes	1,399,916	47.44%
No	1,510,434	51.19%
Blank votes	40,430	1.37%
Total votes	2,910,350	100.00%
Registered voters/turnout		76.42%

Yes
90–100%
80–90%
70–80%
60–70%
50–60%
No
90–100%
80–90%
70–80%
60–70%
50–60%
Other
Tie
No data

2012 Minnesota Amendment 1 (also called Minnesota Marriage Amendment or Minnesota Gay Marriage Amendment) was a legislatively referred constitutional amendment proposed to ban marriage between same-sex couples in the state of Minnesota, that appeared on the ballot on November 6, 2012. It was rejected by 51.19% of voters.

== Legislative approval ==
The Amendment began as a bill proposed in the Minnesota Senate on April 27, 2011, by Warren Limmer, Dave Thompson, Sean Nienow, Dan Hall, and Pam Wolf.

On May 11, 2011, the Minnesota Senate passed a bill to place a proposed amendment to the state constitution on the ballot that would ban same-sex marriage. The vote was 37–27, with all Republicans and one Democrat voting for the amendment. An identical bill was passed by the House on May 21; the vote was 70–62 with two Democrats and all but four Republicans voting for the amendment. The proposed amendment was on the ballot on November 6, 2012. The proposed amendment read: "Only a union of one man and one woman shall be valid or recognized as a marriage in Minnesota." It did not refer to civil unions or domestic partnerships. The question being presented to voters on the ballot read: "Shall the Minnesota Constitution be amended to provide that only a union of one man and one woman shall be valid or recognized as a marriage in Minnesota?"

== Support and opposition ==
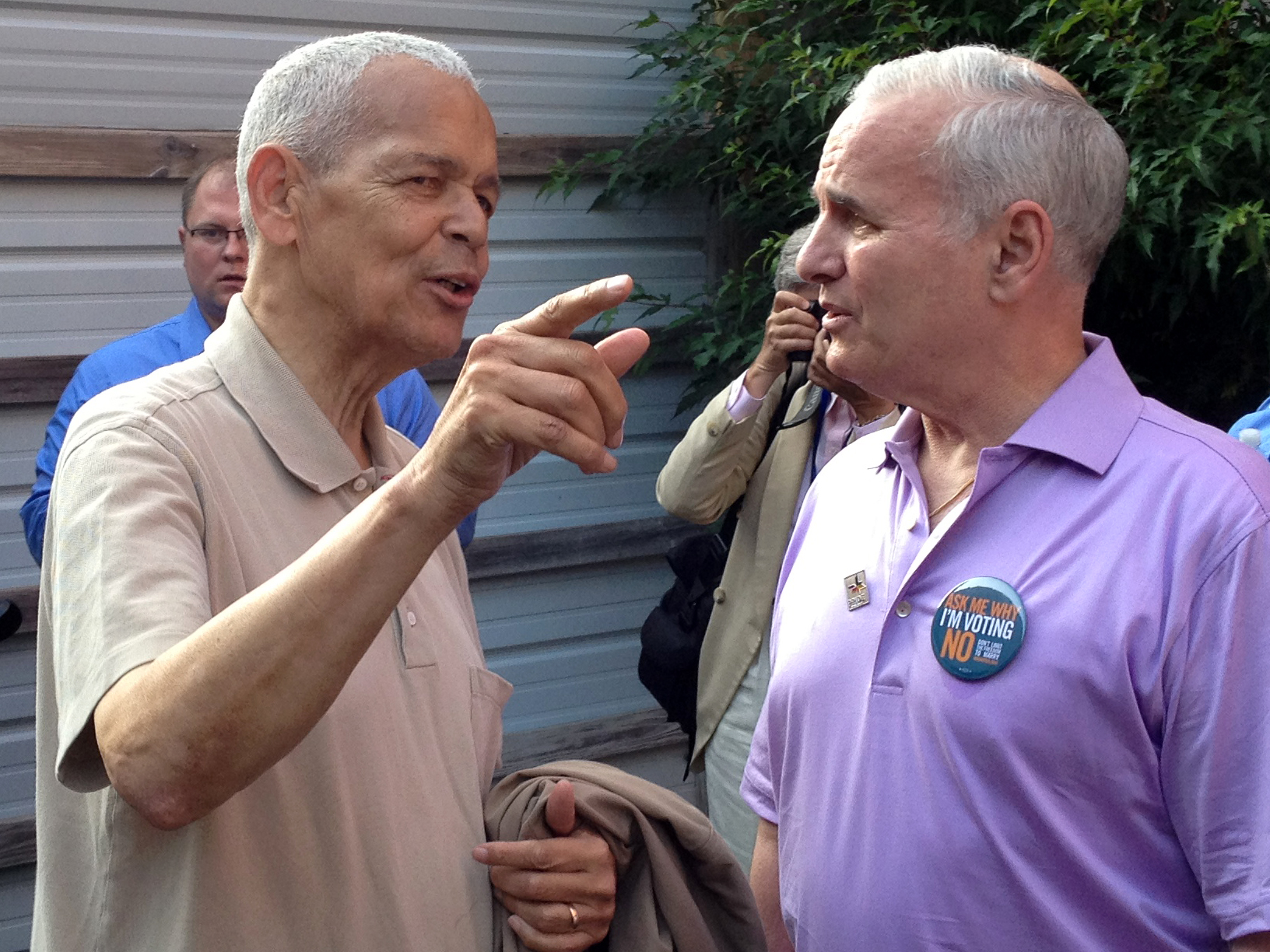
Julian Bond and Governor Mark Dayton at a "Vote No" rally in June 2012.

In March 2012, Minnesota's Roman Catholic bishops had an audience with Pope Benedict XVI, who told them that preserving the traditional definition of marriage was a priority. Roman Catholic Archbishop John Nienstedt of St. Paul and Minneapolis organized leaders of different religious denominations in support of the amendment and committed his own church to spend $650,000 on behalf of its passage. In September he joined other religious leaders in a demonstration in support of the amendment at the State Capitol. The Minnesota Catholic Conference Marriage Defense Fund contributed more than half the $1.2 million raised by Minnesota for Marriage, the principal organization supporting the amendment, including $130,000 from the Knights of Columbus, a national Catholic organization.

Immediately after the Minnesota legislature voted to put Amendment 1 on the ballot, OutFront Minnesota and Project 515, two groups working for LGBTQ rights in the state, formed Minnesotans United for All Families – the main campaign organization that would work to defeat the amendment. Minnesotans United was chaired by Richard Carlbom, the future chair of the DFL. Over the course of a year and a half, Minnesotans United would raise and spend over $12 million, more than double the pro-amendment side. More importantly, the Minnesotans United campaign formed a coalition group of allies with almost 700 member organizations that included political parties, labor unions, veterans, civic groups and businesses like General Mills. The board and staff of the campaign reflected the same kind of diversity as its coalition partners and even included prominent Republicans. Drawing on lessons learned from past campaigns in other states, Minnesotans United did not cede the religious ground – it hired a faith director to reach out to communities of faith, and more than 100 of its coalition members were churches and other faith groups from around the state.

The centerpiece of the Minnesotans United for All Families campaign became its huge grassroots effort to have conversations with the voters about marriage. Rather than focus on equal rights and fairness, as was done in previous campaigns, Minnesotans United and its thousands of volunteers, had personal conversations over the phones and face to face about how marriage had the same importance and meaning for both straight and same-sex couples. This messaging strategy, which was also used in the campaign's ad campaign, helped move conflicted voters and resulted in Minnesota being the first state, after 30 attempts, to defeat a constitutional amendment banning same-sex marriage. Minnesotans United is likely the biggest grassroots campaign in the state's history, having had 27,000 volunteers knock on over 400,000 doors and make over 900,000 phone calls in the final eight days of the campaign

The Minnesota arm of President Obama's presidential re-election campaign announced his opposition to this proposed constitutional amendment in April. Advertisements in opposition to the amendment also featured Minnesota Vikings football player Chris Kluwe.

== Opinion polls ==
Various public opinion surveys of Minnesota residents have asked questions regarding same-sex marriage. The questions vary, with some surveys referring directly to the proposed Amendment and others asking more general questions.

Date of opinion poll	Conducted by	Sample size	For amendment	Against amendment	Undecided/Other	Margin of error	Question
May 2–5, 2011	Star Tribune	806 adults	39%	55%	7% (Don't know/refused to answer)	±4.7%	"Please tell me if you would favor or oppose amending the Minnesota constitution to ban same-sex marriage."
May 23–24, 2011	SurveyUSA	552 RV	51%	40%	2% not sure 8% not vote	±4.3%	"If an amendment to the Minnesota Constitution were on the ballot, that defines marriage as between one man and one woman, would you vote FOR the amendment? Against the amendment? Or not vote on the measure?"
May 27–30, 2011	Public Policy Polling	1,179 voters	46%	47%	7% not sure	±2.9%	"Should the Minnesota Constitution be amended to provide that only a union of one man and one woman shall be valid or recognized as a marriage in Minnesota?"
October 17–26, 2011	St. Cloud State University Survey	626 LV	43.6%	47.4%	9%	±5%	"Should the Minnesota constitution be amended to provide that only a union of one man and one woman shall be valid or recognized as a marriage in Minnesota?"
November 2–3, 2011	Princeton Survey Research Associates International	807 adults	48%	43%	8% (Don't know/refused to answer)	±4.4%	"Would you favor or oppose amending the Minnesota constitution to allow marriage only between a man and a woman?"
November 2–7, 2011	SurveyUSA	543 RV	46%	40%	4% not sure 10% not vote	±4.3%	"If an amendment to the Minnesota Constitution were on the ballot, that defines marriage as between one man and one woman, would you vote FOR the amendment? Against the amendment? Or not vote on the measure?"
January 21–22, 2012	Public Policy Polling	1,236 voters	48%	44%	8% not sure	±2.8%	"Should the Minnesota Constitution be amended to provide that only a union of one man and one woman shall be valid or recognized as a marriage in Minnesota?"
January 31 – February 2, 2012	SurveyUSA	542 RV	47%	39%	4% not sure 10% not vote	±4.3%	"An amendment to the Minnesota Constitution on the ballot defines marriage as between one man and one woman. Will you vote FOR the amendment? Against the amendment? Or not vote on the measure?"
May 31 – June 3, 2012	Public Policy Polling	973 voters	43%	49%	7% not sure	±3.1%	"Should the Minnesota Constitution be amended to provide that only a union of one man and one woman shall be valid or recognized as a marriage in Minnesota?"
July 17–19, 2012	SurveyUSA	552 LV	52%	37%	6% not sure 5% not vote	±4.3%	"An amendment to the Minnesota Constitution on the ballot defines marriage as between one man and one woman. Will you vote FOR the amendment? Against the amendment? Or not vote on the measure?"
September 6–9, 2012	SurveyUSA	551 LV	50%	43%	8%	±4.3%	"Also on the ballot is a ballot measure about marriage. It asks: Shall the Minnesota Constitution be amended to provide that only a union of one man and one woman shall be valid or recognized as a marriage in Minnesota?"
September 10–11, 2012	Public Policy Polling	824 LV	48%	47%	5% not sure	±3.4%	"Should the Minnesota Constitution be amended to provide that only a union of one man and one woman shall be valid or recognized as a marriage in Minnesota?"
September 17–19, 2012	Mason-Dixon Polling and Research, Inc.	800 LV	49%	47%	4%	±3.5%	"Another [amendment on the November ballot] asks "Shall the Minnesota Constitution be amended to provide that only a union of one man and one woman shall be valid or recognized as marriage in Minnesota?" If the election were held today, would you vote: "YES", in favor of the amendment; "NO", against the amendment."
October 5–8, 2012	Public Policy Polling	937 LV	46%	49%	5% not sure 1% won't vote	±3.2%	"Should the Minnesota Constitution be amended to provide that only a union of one man and one woman shall be valid or recognized as a marriage in Minnesota?"
October 12–14, 2012	SurveyUSA	550 LV	47%	46%	7%	±4.3%	"Also on the ballot is a ballot measure about marriage. It asks: Shall the Minnesota Constitution be amended to provide that only a union of one man and one woman shall be valid or recognized as a marriage in Minnesota?"
October 15–21, 2012	St. Cloud State University Survey	600 LV	44%	51%	5%	±5%	"The second proposed amendment to the Minnesota Constitution asks "Shall the Minnesota Constitution be amended to provide that only a union of one man and one woman be valid or recognized as marriage in Minnesota?" If you were to vote today would you vote for the amendment, vote against the amendment, or not vote on this issue?"
October 23–25, 2012	Mason-Dixon Polling and Research, Inc.	800 LV	48%	47%	5%	±3.5%	"Another ballot question asks "Shall the Minnesota Constitution be amended to provide that only a union of one man and one woman shall be valid or recognized as marriage in Minnesota?" If the election were held today, would you vote: YES in favor of the amendment; NO against the amendment"
October 26–28, 2012	SurveyUSA	574 LV	48%	47%	5%	±4.2%	"Also on the ballot is a ballot measure about marriage. It asks: Shall the Minnesota Constitution be amended to provide that only a union of one man and one woman shall be valid or recognized as a marriage in Minnesota?"
November 1–3, 2012	SurveyUSA	556 LV	47%	48%	5%	±4.2%	"Also on the ballot is a ballot measure about marriage. It asks: Shall the Minnesota Constitution be amended to provide that only a union of one man and one woman shall be valid or recognized as a marriage in Minnesota?"
November 2–3, 2012	Public Policy Polling	1,164 LV	45%	52%	3% not sure 0% won't vote	±2.9%	"Should the Minnesota Constitution be amended to provide that only a union of one man and one woman shall be valid or recognized as a marriage in Minnesota?"

== Results ==
Constitutional Amendment 1 Recognition of Marriage Solely Between One Man and One Woman
Choice	Votes	%
For	1,399,675	48.10
Against	1,510,366	51.90
Total	2,910,041	100.00
Valid votes	2,910,041	98.63
Invalid/blank votes	40,398	1.37
Total votes	2,950,439	100.00
Registered voters/turnout		Precincts Reporting - 100

=== County breakdown ===
Breakdown of voting by county
County	No	Votes	Yes	Votes
Aitkin	38.2%	3,428	61.8%	5,699
Anoka	49.4%	90,468	50.6%	94,690
Becker	37.1%	5,848	62.9%	10,364
Beltrami	48.9%	10,563	51.1%	11,334
Benton	44.6%	8,606	55.4%	10,943
Big Stone	32.9%	887	67.1%	1,888
Blue Earth	54.2%	18,291	45.8%	15,796
Brown	33.6%	4,604	66.4%	9,312
Carlton	48.1%	8,758	51.9%	9,632
Carver	49.9%	25,953	50.1%	26,552
Cass	38.1%	5,996	61.9%	10,041
Chippewa	36.9%	2,252	63.1%	3,944
Chisago	43.1%	12,459	56.9%	16,815
Clay	49.5%	13,903	50.5%	14,652
Clearwater	29.1%	1,168	70.9%	3,000
Cook	60.1%	1,978	39.9%	1,334
Cottonwood	30.0%	1,759	70.0%	4,143
Crow Wing	40.2%	13,770	59.8%	20,954
Dakota	55.4%	125,705	44.6%	103,250
Dodge	41.4%	4,199	58.6%	6,096
Douglas	36.4%	7,474	63.6%	13,436
Faribault	35.1%	2,668	64.9%	5,046
Fillmore	43.4%	4,609	56.6%	6,196
Freeborn	40.0%	6,518	60.0%	10,097
Goodhue	47.6%	12,079	52.4%	13,583
Grant	36.1%	1,226	63.9%	2,241
Hennepin	65.3%	433,803	34.7%	237,084
Houston	42.3%	4,256	57.7%	6,066
Hubbard	38.1%	4,310	61.9%	7,185
Isanti	39.0%	7,742	61.0%	12,391
Itasca	44.3%	10,412	55.7%	13,392
Jackson	31.2%	1,665	68.8%	3,785
Kanabec	35.5%	2,828	64.5%	5,281
Kandiyohi	37.2%	7,774	62.8%	13,523
Kittson	33.6%	780	66.4%	1,629
Koochiching	46.2%	2,910	53.8%	3,504
Lac qui Parle	32.3%	1,257	67.7%	2,711
Lake	49.0%	3,268	51.0%	3,496
Lake of the Woods	36.1%	769	63.9%	1,436
Le Sueur	42.4%	6,163	57.6%	8,559
Lincoln	29.8%	879	70.2%	2,211
Lyon	38.0%	4,628	62.0%	7,725
McLeod	34.3%	6,218	65.7%	12,253
Mahnomen	38.6%	807	61.4%	1,350
Marshall	28.2%	1,119	71.8%	3,541
Martin	32.4%	3,466	67.6%	7,465
Meeker	35.5%	4,264	64.5%	7,937
Mille Lacs	39.3%	5,053	60.7%	8,004
Morrison	32.1%	5,228	67.9%	11,424
Mower	43.2%	7,818	56.8%	10,603
Murray	29.0%	1,337	71.0%	3,419
Nicollet	53.0%	9,595	47.0%	8,670
Nobles	25.7%	2,035	74.3%	6,393
Norman	37.0%	1,132	63.0%	2,050
Olmsted	51.0%	39,053	49.0%	38,525
Otter Tail	33.5%	10,202	66.5%	21,180
Pennington	38.6%	2,444	61.4%	4,030
Pine	37.8%	5,216	62.2%	8,756
Pipestone	24.4%	1,092	75.6%	3,539
Polk	35.4%	4,951	64.6%	9,547
Pope	36.5%	2,242	63.5%	3,991
Ramsey	63.5%	172,197	36.5%	102,069
Red Lake	32.3%	617	67.7%	1,356
Redwood	30.5%	2,330	69.5%	5,455
Renville	33.7%	2,549	66.3%	5,145
Rice	53.7%	17,025	46.3%	15,010
Rock	26.6%	1,218	73.4%	3,579
Roseau	30.1%	2,115	69.9%	5,185
Scott	51.1%	35,951	48.9%	35,212
Sherburne	43.7%	19,953	56.3%	26,306
Sibley	31.3%	2,379	68.7%	5,404
St. Louis	55.9%	63,663	44.1%	51,272
Stearns	47.0%	36,309	53.0%	41,849
Steele	44.4%	8,339	55.6%	10,685
Stevens	44.3%	2,463	55.7%	3,163
Swift	39.1%	1,847	60.9%	3,293
Todd	28.8%	3,311	71.2%	8,448
Traverse	33.8%	602	66.2%	1,238
Wabasha	40.8%	4,698	59.2%	7,011
Wadena	30.4%	1,981	69.6%	4,769
Waseca	40.2%	3,873	59.8%	5,877
Washington	55.3%	77,108	44.7%	63,767
Watonwan	36.4%	1,828	63.6%	3,295
Wilkin	31.4%	967	68.6%	2,222
Winona	53.0%	14,132	47.0%	12,884
Wright	44.0%	29,259	56.0%	38,157
Yellow Medicine	34.5%	1,835	65.5%	3,572

== See also ==
- Recognition of same-sex unions in Minnesota
- LGBT rights in Minnesota
- Baker v. Nelson
- Maine Question 1, 2012
- Maryland Question 6
- Washington Referendum 74
