= Taxpayers League of Minnesota =

American think tank

The Taxpayers League of Minnesota is a conservative lobbying group dedicated to lowering taxes in Minnesota. Ted Lillie serves as the group's president. Prior to that, Darrell McKigney, Linda Runbeck, David Strom, and Phil Krinkie have served as Presidents of the Taxpayers League.

The Taxpayers League was founded in 1997 by Mike Wigley. It is primarily funded through large donations by individuals and corporation, providing weekly email updates and maintaining contact with legislators. Its representatives have made appearances on At Issue and Almanac.

The Taxpayers League has offered up a "Friend of the Taxpayers" award to legislators. Previous winners of the award include Gil Gutknecht and Bruce Anderson. In 2004, after the death of former-President Ronald Reagan, the League proposed renaming Minnesota State Highway 55 after the conservative icon; the plan was met with resistance and abandoned.

The Taxpayers League sued State of Minnesota officials after a Minnesota campaign finance law was struck down as unconstitutional in 2010. Under the revised law, the League said they would be unfairly penalized if they used their general funds to contribute to Republican candidates Paul Gazelka and Tom Emmer.

In 2012, the Taxpayers League of Minnesota conducted a poll that found that the majority of respondents opposed building a new stadium for the Vikings.
