= Scott Wasiluk =

American politician

Member of the Minnesota House of Representatives from the 55A district
- In office 2003–2004

Member of the Minnesota House of Representatives from the 55B district
- In office 2001–2002

Personal details
- Born: May 1, 1958 (age 68) Ramsey County, Minnesota, U.S.
- Party: Minnesota Democratic–Farmer–Labor Party
- Spouse: Julie
- Children: two
- Education: University of St. Thomas
- Occupation: Microbiologist

Scott Allen Wasiluk (born May 1, 1958) is an American politician in the state of Minnesota. He served in the Minnesota House of Representatives.
