= Mike May (Iowa politician) =

American politician from Iowa (born 1945)

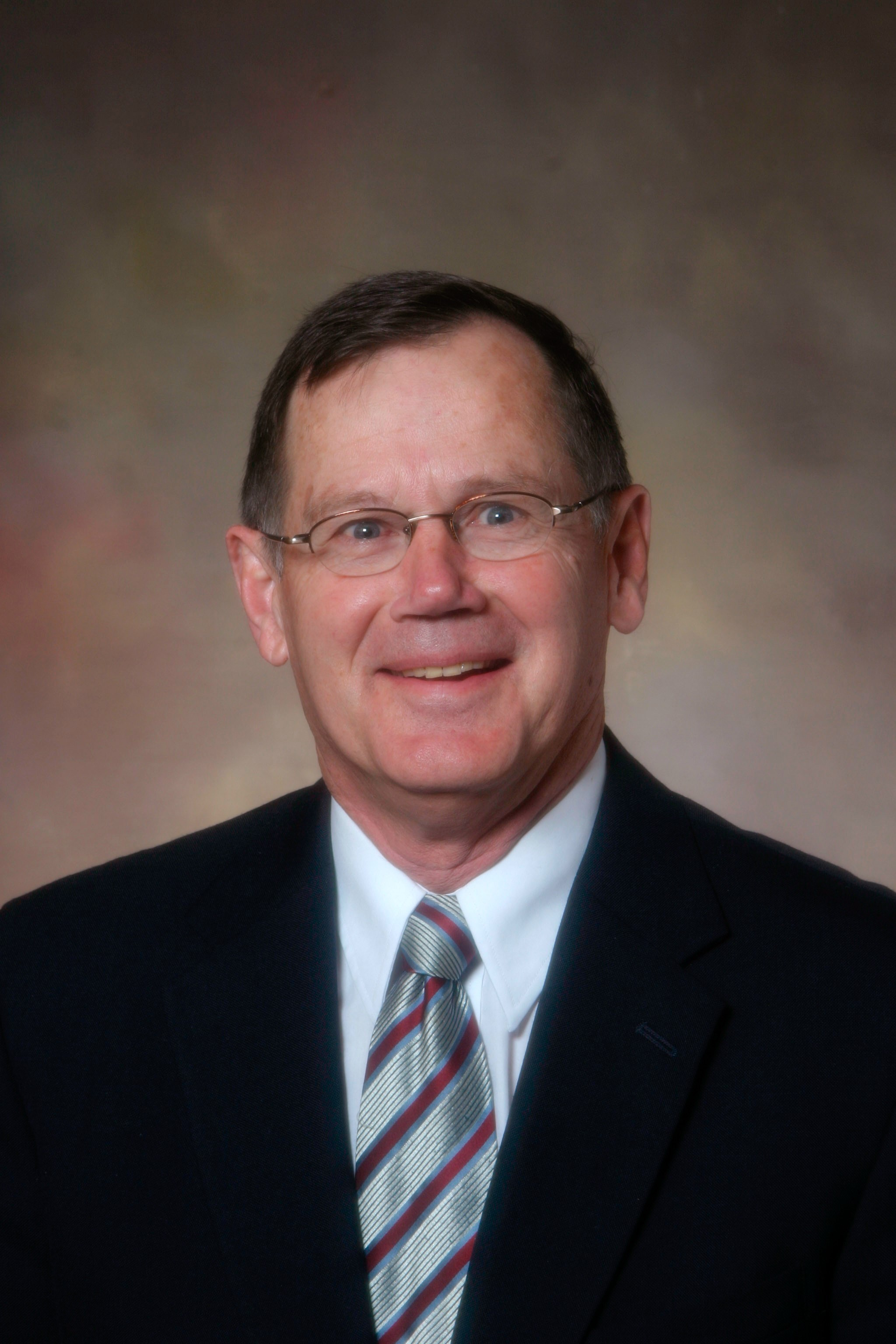

Member of the Iowa House of Representatives from the 6th district
- In office January 2005 – January 2011
- Preceded by: Greg Stevens
- Succeeded by: Jeff Smith

Personal details
- Born: June 22, 1945 (age 81) Hobbs, New Mexico, U.S.
- Party: Republican
- Spouse: Marge
- Children: Mike, Lisa, and Dan
- Website: legis.iowa.gov/...

Mike May (born June 22, 1945, in Hobbs, New Mexico) is an American former politician who was the Iowa State Representative from the 6th District. He served in the Iowa House of Representatives from 2005 through 2011. He received his BA from Simpson College and his MS from Minnesota State University, Mankato.

May currently serves on several committees in the Iowa House – the Economic Growth committee; the Transportation committee; and the Education committee, where he is the ranking member. He also serves on the Education Appropriations Subcommittee.

May was re-elected in 2006 with 8,281 votes, running unopposed.

Iowa House of Representatives
Preceded by Greg Stevens	6th District; 2005–2011	Succeeded by Jeff Smith
