= Don Shoning =

American politician (1915–1999)

Donald W. Shoning (8 July 1915 – 11 February 1999) was an American politician.

Shoning was born in Battle Creek, Iowa, on 8 July 1915, to parents Harvey and Marie Shoning. He attended Danbury High School in Danbury, Iowa. Shoning met and married Danbury native Grace Richards, with whom he had two daughters. Shoning later attended business schools in Scranton, Pennsylvania and Oak Park, Illinois, and also served in the United States Army during World War II. After the war, Shoning was employed by the Westinghouse Electric Corporation.

Shoning was a member of the Republican Party who served on the Sioux City Council from 1966 to 1969. During his tenure as a city councilor, he was endorsed by the Woodbury County Labor Council. Shoning was active in discussions on municipal construction projects. Between 1972 and August 1981, Shoning was the zoning administrator for Woodbury County. Shoning contested his first state legislative election in 1982, losing to Democratic Party incumbent state representative Leo P. Miller. Miller's retirement left an open seat in District 3 of the Iowa House of Representatives, which Shoning won in 1984, against general election opponent Terry Kelley. At the start of his second term as a state representative, Shoning was appointed acting ranking minority member of the House State Government Committee in place of colleague George R. Swearingen. Shoning remained a state legislator for four consecutive terms, retiring in 1993. He died in Sioux City on 11 February 1999.
