= Yvonne Dean-Bailey =

American politician (born 1995)

Member of the New Hampshire House of Representatives for Rockingham District 32
- In office May 19, 2015 – April 19, 2018
- Preceded by: Brian Dobson

Personal details
- Born: Yvonne M. Dean-Bailey; December 3, 1995 (age 30) Rockingham County, New Hampshire, U.S.
- Education: Mount Holyoke College (BS)
- Occupation: Communications and Government Affairs professional

Yvonne Dean-Bailey (born December 1, 1995) is a communications and government affairs professional and former politician who served as a member of the New Hampshire House of Representatives from 2015 to 2018 for the Republican Party, representing Rockingham District 32. Dean-Bailey currently is a member of Conservatives against Discrimination and CEO of FLO Communications, a public relations and marketing firm, based in Los Angeles, California.

== Early life and education ==
Dean-Bailey was born December 3, 1995, in Essex County, Massachusetts. She is a graduate of Phillips Exeter Academy in Exeter, New Hampshire.

== Politics ==
After Brian Dobson (R) resigned from New Hampshire House of Representatives to become director of military and veteran affairs for U.S. congressman Frank Guinta, a special election was triggered. Ultimately, Dean-Bailey, a former staffer for Marilinda Garcia and Kelly Ayotte, was elected into office assuming her role on May 19, 2015. In addition to several local Libertarian and Republican statewide supporters she also received attention from high-profile Republican politicians which included Rick Perry, Carly Fiorina, Marco Rubio and George Pataki. She resigned from office on April 19, 2018

== Personal life ==
Dean-Bailey resides in Los Angeles, California.
