= Peggy McCarthy (politician) =

American politician

Member of New Hampshire House of Representatives for Hillsborough 29
- In office 2014–2016

Personal details
- Party: Republican

Peggy McCarthy is an American politician. She was a member of the New Hampshire House of Representatives and represented Hillsborough's 29th district.

McCarthy endorsed the Carly Fiorina 2016 presidential campaign.
