= Buck Humphrey =

American political aide and federal communications official

Hubert "Buck" Humphrey IV

Personal details
- Born: November 24, 1969 (age 56) Ramsey County, Minnesota, U.S.
- Party: Democratic
- Parent(s): Skip Humphrey; Nancy Jeffery
- Relatives: Hubert Humphrey (grandfather)
- Education: American University (BA); Hamline University (MPA)
- Occupation: Political aide; communications and government affairs executive

Hubert Horatio "Buck" Humphrey IV (born November 24, 1969) is an American political aide and communications executive from Minnesota. A member of the Humphrey political family, he was the Democratic–Farmer–Labor nominee for Minnesota Secretary of State in 2002. He later served in senior communications roles in the federal government and worked in government affairs and public affairs consulting.

== Early life and education ==
Humphrey was born in Ramsey County, Minnesota, and raised in the Twin Cities region. He is the son of former Minnesota attorney general Hubert H. "Skip" Humphrey III and the grandson of U.S. Senator and Vice President Hubert Humphrey. He earned a bachelor's degree from American University and a Master of Public Administration from Hamline University.

== Early political career ==
Humphrey began his career in municipal government as a policy aide in Minneapolis and in the late 1990s moved into statewide campaign operations and DFL organizing, working on outreach and field operations across Minnesota.

== Role in 2000 and 2008 presidential campaigns ==
Humphrey served in senior state campaign roles for Democratic presidential campaigns. He was part of the Minnesota operation for the 2000 Gore campaign and later held a senior state leadership role for Hillary Clinton's 2008 campaign in Minnesota, coordinating state staff and local outreach efforts.

== 2002 Secretary of State campaign ==
Humphrey announced his candidacy for Minnesota Secretary of State in December 2001 and won the DFL nomination to challenge incumbent Mary Kiffmeyer in the 2002 general election. He lost to Kiffmeyer on November 5, 2002.

=== Election results ===
Year	Office	Candidate	Party	Votes	Percentage
2002	Secretary of State (Minnesota)	Mary Kiffmeyer	Republican	1,040,740	47.55%
2002	Secretary of State (Minnesota)	Buck Humphrey	Democratic	974,345	44.52%
2002	Secretary of State (Minnesota)	Dean Alger	Independence	104,799	4.79%
2002	Secretary of State (Minnesota)	Andrew S. Koebrick	Green	67,404	3.08%
Source: Minnesota Historical Election Archive (official compiled returns).

== Legal issues ==
Humphrey's prior arrests for driving under the influence were reported during and after his 2002 campaign. In October 2017, the St. Cloud Times reported that Humphrey faced a fourth DUI charge and summarized earlier proceedings; the article noted that Humphrey had previously pleaded guilty to a drunken driving offense and described the sentence imposed in that earlier case, which included probation, an ignition interlock requirement, and work-crew time.

== Federal government service ==
After his state political work, Humphrey served in senior communications and public affairs roles in the federal government, including work with the U.S. Citizenship and Immigration Services communications office at the Department of Homeland Security.

== Later career and modern activity ==
After federal service, Humphrey moved into government affairs and public-affairs consulting, leading regional practice groups and advising clients on legislative, procurement, and public-affairs matters in Minnesota and Washington, D.C.; he has been associated with Forbes-Tate and Hill Capitol Strategies in Minnesota.
