= Mary Kiffmeyer =

American politician (born 1946)

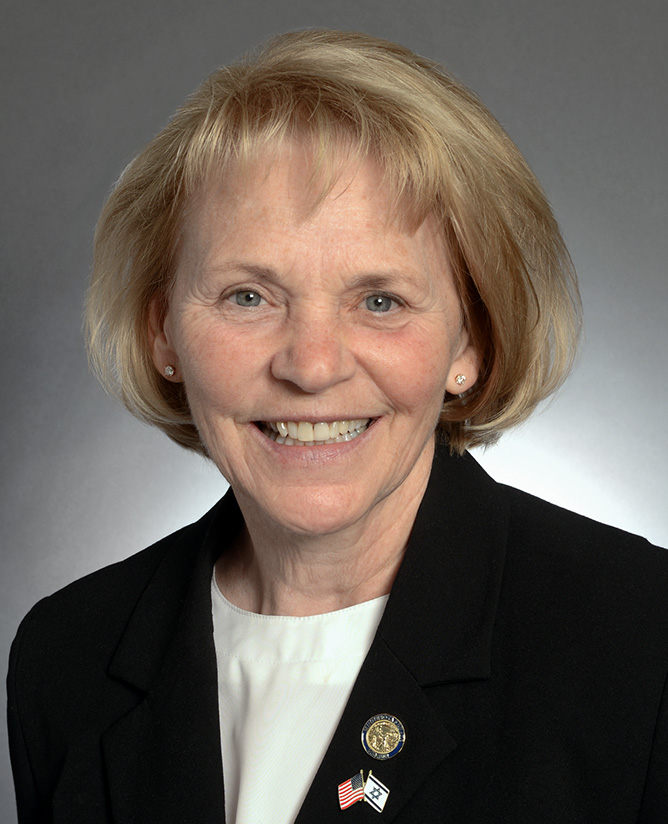
- Kiffmeyer in 2015

20th Secretary of State of Minnesota
- In office January 4, 1999 – January 1, 2007
- Governor: Jesse Ventura; Tim Pawlenty
- Preceded by: Joan Growe
- Succeeded by: Mark Ritchie

President pro tempore of the Minnesota Senate
- In office January 7, 2019 – January 5, 2021
- Preceded by: Warren Limmer
- Succeeded by: David Tomassoni

Member of the Minnesota Senate from the 30th district
- In office January 8, 2013 – January 3, 2023
- Preceded by: Redistricted
- Succeeded by: Redistricted

Member of the Minnesota House of Representatives from the 16B district
- In office January 6, 2009 – January 7, 2013
- Preceded by: Mark Olson
- Succeeded by: Redistricted

Personal details
- Born: December 29, 1946 (age 79) Rugby, North Dakota, U.S.
- Party: Republican
- Spouse: Ralph Kiffmeyer
- Education: St. Gabriel's School of Nursing

Mary Kiffmeyer (born December 29, 1946) is an American politician. She served as Minnesota Secretary of State from 1999 to 2007 and went on to serve in the Minnesota legislature. A member of the Republican Party of Minnesota, she previously represented District 30, which included parts of Hennepin, Sherburne, and Wright counties.

== Early life ==
The oldest of 14 children, Kiffmeyer was raised in Pierz, Minnesota.

== Minnesota Secretary of State ==
Kiffmeyer was elected secretary of state in November 1998, and was sworn into office on January 4, 1999. She was re-elected in November 2002. She was defeated for re-election in November 2006 by Mark Ritchie.

During Kiffmeyer's tenure, Minnesota was the highest voter turnout state for all 8 years as determined by Curtis Ganz of the Center for Democracy. In 2004, Minnesota had 77.7% voter turnout, the highest in the state since 1960. She transformed the Secretary of State website allowing users to find and get directions to their local precincts, and see who their local candidates are in the upcoming election through the "My Ballot" feature..

During Kiffmeyer's tenure, she convinced the legislature to establish the Safe At Home Program for victims of domestic violence who wanted to register to vote and keep their address private.

== Minnesota Legislature ==
Kiffmeyer was elected to the Minnesota House of Representatives in 2008 and re-elected in 2010, representing District 16B. In 2012, she was elected to the Minnesota Senate, representing District 30. Kiffmeyer served as the president pro tempore of the Minnesota Senate for two years.

== Electoral history ==
- Minnesota Senate 30th district election, 2020
  - Mary Kiffmeyer (Republican), 34714 (67.3%)
  - Diane Nguyen (DFL), 16861 (32.7%)
  - Write-in, 45 (0.1%)
- Minnesota Senate 30th district election, 2016
  - Mary Kiffmeyer (Republican), 30484 (71.7%)
  - P.J. LaCroix (DFL), 11979 (28.2%)
  - Write-in, 49 (0.1%)
- Minnesota Senate 30th district election, 2012
  - Mary Kiffmeyer (Republican), 25205 (62.4%)
  - Paul Perovich (DFL), 15125 (37.5%)
  - Write-in, 58 (0.1%)
- Minnesota House of Representatives 16B district election, 2010
  - Mary Kiffmeyer (Republican), 13,254 (70.4%)
  - Tom Heyd (DFL), 5,563 (29.5%)
  - Write-in, 18 (0.1%)
- Minnesota House of Representatives 16B district election, 2008
  - Mary Kiffmeyer (Republican), 15,863 (63.5%)
  - Steve Andrews (DFL), 8,996 (36.0%)
  - Write-in, 114 (0.5%)
- Minnesota secretary of state election, 2006
  - Mark Ritchie (DFL), 1,049,432 (49.1%)
  - Mary Kiffmeyer (Republican), 943,989 (44.2%)
  - Bruce Kennedy (For Independent Voters), 78,522 (3.7%)
  - Joel Spoonheim (Independence), 64,489 (3.0%)
  - Write-in, 1,211 (0.1%)
- Minnesota secretary of state election, 2002
  - Mary Kiffmeyer (Republican), 1,040,739 (47.6%)
  - Buck Humphrey (DFL), 974,045 (44.5%)
  - Dean Alger (Independence), 104,799 (4.8%)
  - Andrew Koebrick (Green), 67,404 (3.1%)
  - Write-in, 1,253 (0.1%)
- Minnesota secretary of state election, 1998
  - Mary Kiffmeyer (Republican), 928,576 (46.8%)
  - Edwina Garcia (DFL), 818,236 (41.2%)
  - Alan Shilepsky (Reform), 192,997 (9.7%)
  - Kenneth Iverson (Libertarian), 44,663 (2.2%)
  - Write-in, 1,742 (0.1%)

== Personal life ==
Kiffmeyer lives near Big Lake, Minnesota with her husband, Ralph Kiffmeyer, a nurse anesthetist who served one term in the Minnesota House of Representatives. They have four children and 14 grandchildren.

Party political offices
Preceded by Richard Kimbler	Republican nominee for Minnesota Secretary of State; 1998, 2002, 2006	Succeeded by Dan Severson
Political offices
Preceded by Joan Growe	Secretary of State of Minnesota; 1999–2007	Succeeded by Mark Ritchie
Minnesota House of Representatives
Preceded by Mark Olson	Member of the Minnesota House of Representatives from the 16B district 2009–2013	Redistricted
Minnesota Senate
Redistricted	Member of the Minnesota Senate from the 30th district 2013–present	Incumbent
Preceded by Warren Limmer	President pro tempore of the Minnesota Senate; 2019–2021	Succeeded by David Tomassoni
