= Minnesota Legislature =

Legislative branch of the state government of Minnesota

- 94th Minnesota Legislature

Type
- Type: Bicameral
- Houses: Senate; House of Representatives
- Term limits: None

Leadership
- Senate President: Bobby Joe Champion (D) since February 3, 2025
- House Speaker: Lisa Demuth (R) since February 6, 2025

Structure
- Seats: 201 (67 senators, 134 representatives)
- Senate political groups: DFL (34); Republican (33)
- House of Representatives political groups: DFL (67); Republican (67)

Elections
- Last Senate election: November 8, 2022
- Last House of Representatives election: November 5, 2024

Meeting place
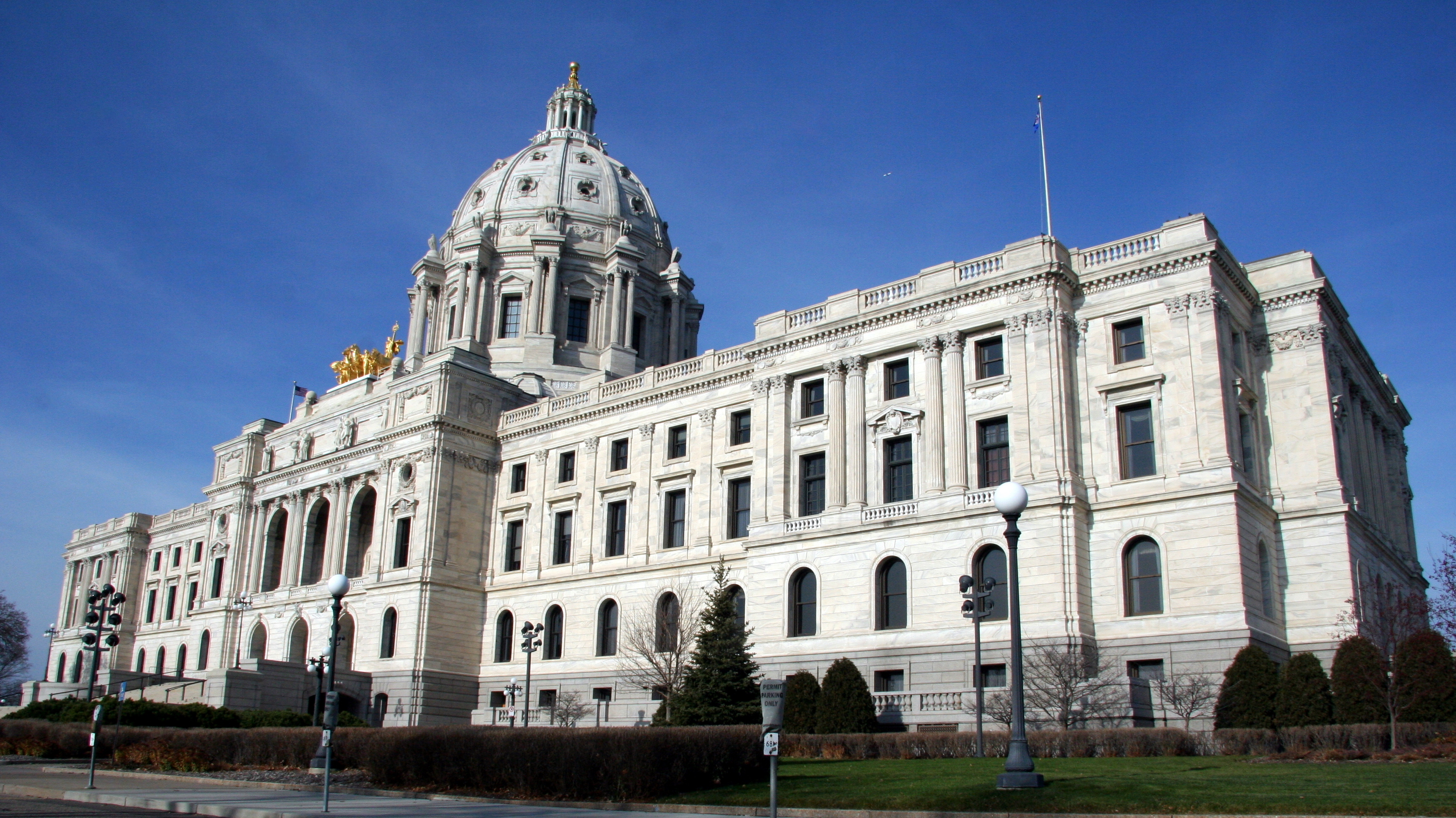
- Minnesota State Capitol; Saint Paul

Website
- www.leg.mn.gov

Constitution
- Constitution of Minnesota

The Minnesota Legislature is the bicameral legislature of the U.S. state of Minnesota, composed of a Senate and a House of Representatives. The legislature originally met at the old Territorial Capitol in Saint Paul and now convenes at the Minnesota State Capitol. The Senate consists of 67 seats, the House 134 seats and the legislators serve without term limits.

The legislature meets between January and the first Monday following the third Saturday in May each year, not to exceed 120 legislative days per biennium. Floor sessions are held in the Minnesota State Capitol in Saint Paul.

In the 94th Legislature (2025–2026), the Democratic-Farmer-Labor (DFL) Party controls the Senate with 34 of the 67 seats and the House evenly split between the DFL and Republicans, with both parties holding 67 of the 134 seats.

== History ==
=== Territorial status ===
Portions of the area that would become the State of Minnesota have been part of the United States since the Treaty of Paris 1783 established the boundaries of the newly independent nation. In 1787, the region was organized under the control of the expansive Northwest Territory, but portions of this region were in dispute with British North America until 1818. The Louisiana Purchase in 1803 brought in the remainder of the territory into the control of the US. Over the next few decades the area would be organized under the Indiana, Illinois, Michigan, Missouri, Wisconsin, and Iowa territories. Due to the lack of European settlement the exact boundaries of the region was not a major concern. Following the statehood of Iowa in 1846 and Wisconsin in 1848, there was a desire for reorganization centered around the remaining unorganized populace which was based in St. Croix County. Settlers held a convention in Stillwater and passed resolutions to the U.S. Congress calling for the establishment of a new territory. This request was granted with the creation of the Minnesota Territory on March 3, 1849. St. Paul was selected as the territorial capitol, the University of Minnesota was placed in Minneapolis, and the Territorial Prison in Stillwater. Alexander Ramsey was appointed as the first territorial governor. The territorial legislature organized with 18 members of the House of Representatives and 9 members of the Territorial Council.

Policies involving the native population were a focus of the territory. Minnesota was rare in that mixed race native persons were explicitly granted citizenship and allowed to participate in the political process. In 1851, the legislature oversaw the major land cession of native tribes through the treaties of Mendota and Traverse des Sioux, which opened up the southern half of the territory to white settlement.

The territory also highlighted national debates on slavery, as it served as the setting for Dred Scott v. Sandford. Dred Scott, an enslaved person, had been brought into the non-slaveholding territory by his owners and lived there for several years.

=== Establishment and early statehood ===
The population of the territory grew rapidly from around 6,000 in 1849 to over 120,000 over the next decade. The growing population and the debate around a transcontinental railroad brought the issue of statehood to the fore. National sectionalist debates over the issue of slavery made the admission of the state highly contentious, but it was decided that Minnesota would be admitted as a free state helping to disrupt the balance between slave and free states which had existed previously. A constitutional convention began in 1857, but internal partisan divisions between the Democratic and Republican parties resulted in delegates from each party writing separate constitutions. The two documents were nearly identical with only minor differences in punctuation and grammar. The joint documents were approved by popular vote, but the territorial secretary, who was a Democrat, sent the Democrats' copy to Congress for approval. However, there is evidence that Congress saw both versions: they sent the copy of the Republican version back with the enacting legislation. Minnesota was granted statehood on May 11, 1858.

The state legislature convened prior to the ratification of their constitution by Congress with 80 members of the House of Representatives and 37 Senators. The first regular session lasted 254 days, which still ranks as the longest of any meeting, and was so long that it was determined that it was not necessary for the legislature to meet for a year following the 1858 election. The size of the legislature was soon decreased; by 1861 the House had 42 members and the Senate had 21. Representatives served a one-year term, Senators served two year terms with elections being staggered so that half the body was elected every year.

During the Civil War, Minnesota contributed several regiments to support the Union, including the 1st Minnesota Infantry which famously captured a Confederate battle flag during the Battle of Gettysburg, which has remained in possession of the despite multiple requests from Virginia to return it. While the state was far from the frontlines of the war, it did not escape conflict. In 1862, the Dakota War broke out between the United States government and four Dakota bands, leading to the removal of some protections on native voting rights and the abolition of some reservations.

Following the Civil War and start of Reconstruction, Minnesota was an early leader in African American civil rights. In 1868, African American men were granted the right to vote, two years before the adoption of the 15th Amendment. In 1869, the legislature banned segregation in state schools. In 1885, the legislature expanded this protection by prohibiting segregation in all public accommodations.

Early in Minnesota's statehood, the legislature had direct control over the city charters that set the groundwork for municipal governments across the state. In the early period, many laws were written by the legislature for specific cities. The practice was outlawed in 1881, though attempts to enact municipal legislation were still made. For instance, the long-standing Minneapolis Park and Recreation Board and the city's now-defunct Library Board were both created by the legislature in the 1880s. The Minnesota Constitution was amended in 1896 to give cities direct control over their own charters.

Prior to 1898, after receiving majority votes in both chambers, constitutional amendments had to be ratified by voters in a simple majority in the next general election. In 1898, the legislative process changed to require a majority of all voters in the election to approve, not just a majority of those who cast a vote on the question. This means that voting "no" and abstaining on an amendment both count against its passage. Amendments which have a majority of "yes" votes can still fail if they don't meet the threshold: a majority of the total number of voters who cast ballots that election.

In 1860, the legislature set a limit of 60 days on their annual legislative session. Starting in 1879, the legislature shifted to a biennial calendar in which they would meet only in odd numbered years. By 1889, the length of the session was extended to 90 legislative days. The 1879 legislature also saw the length of members terms extended to two years for representatives and four years for senators, with the entire body being up for election at the same time.

The early era was marked by Republican dominance in the legislature. Notable figures from the time include: Ignatius Donnelly (Lieutenant Governor, 1860–1863, and congressman, 1863–1869), John S. Pillsbury (Governor, 1876–1882), William R. Merriam (Speaker of the House, 1887–1889, and Governor, 1889–1893), and John Francis Wheaton (State Rep., 1899–1900), the first African American elected to the legislature. The legislature moved into the current State Capitol in 1905.

=== The nonpartisan era ===
In 1913, Minnesota became the first state to elect their legislators on a nonpartisan basis. This was a historical accident. It occurred when a bill to provide for nonpartisan elections of judges, city, and county officers was amended to include the legislature in the belief that it would kill the bill. While Minnesota legislators were elected on a nonpartisan ballot, they caucused as "Liberals" or "Conservatives," roughly the equivalent to national political parties. Conventions developed with defined roles for majority and minority caucus leaders. In 1901, Winslow W. Dunn was selected as the first majority leader of the House, followed in 1933 by Charles N. Orr as the first Senate majority leader. While the legislature was nonpartisan, statewide and congressional seats still carried partisan labels.

The state was notable for the success of populist third parties. In 1891, Ezra T. Champlin of the Farmers' Alliance, a predecessor of the People's Party, was selected as Speaker of the House. Prior to the adoption of non-partisan legislatures, the body consistently had members of the Populist, Socialist, and Prohibition parties. The state also voted for the Bull Moose Party in the 1912 presidential election. In 1915, the Nonpartisan League was established in neighboring North Dakota; by 1917, it had expanded into the state. The Nonpartisan League soon merged with local political groups to form the Farmer-Labor Party. The party started to gain traction in 1922 with the election of Henrik Shipstead and Magnus Johnson to the US Senate. The party garnered even greater success during the Great Depression, with a radical platform focused on addressing the economic situation. In 1930, Farmer-Labor member Floyd B. Olsen was elected as Governor, where he became an influential figure. In 1944, the Farmer-Labor Party officially merged with the state's Democratic Party to form the Democratic–Farmer–Labor Party (DFL).

A defining attribute of the legislature at the time involved redistricting. In 1913, the Senate was expanded of 67 members and the House to 130. Following the 1910 census, the legislature drew new maps for the congressional and state legislative districts. The state supreme court upheld the boundaries for 1910, then the legislature chose not to alter legislative boundaries following subsequent censuses. Between 1913 and 1962, the boundaries for state legislative districts did not change, and the boundaries for congressional districts changed only once following the 1930 census, after the state lost the 10th congressional district in national reapportionment. The legislature passed a new map in 1931, but Governor Floyd B. Olsen vetoed the maps. The issue ultimately went to the U.S. Supreme Court in Smiley v. Holm, where the court ruled that the governor's veto was valid. Due to a delay in the drawing of districts caused by the court case, the state's representatives to Congress were elected statewide in 1932.

In 1959, a panel of federal judges ruled that the state legislative districts were unconstitutional due to the vast population differences since 1910 and ordered the lines be redrawn, effective in 1962. These new maps were overturned in 1964 following the application of the landmark Supreme Court case Baker v. Carr, which established the principle of "one person, one vote". State maps continued to be argued and redrawn, including a proposal that would have reduced the legislature to 35 senators and 105 House districts, until a 1972 decision by the U.S. Supreme Court set the legislature at its current size of 67 senators and 134 House seats and required that districts could only vary in population size by up to 1.8%. In 1962, the legislative session was extended to 120 days.

Though the Conservative caucus maintained control over the legislature for the majority of the nonpartisan period, Minnesota's legislature was an early advocate of many of the issues dominating the Progressive Era. In 1911, the state became the fourth in the nation to abolish the death penalty. The following year, it was the third state to ratify the 17th Amendment providing for the direct election of United States Senators. In 1919, the legislature voted to ratify the 18th Amendment, prohibiting the sale of alcohol, the day after it had secured the necessary number of states to become law. Minnesota congressman Andrew J. Volstead strongly supported the enacting legislation for Prohibition, called the Volstead Act, and pushed the 18th Amendment through Congress. Minnesota passed legislation the same year allowing women to vote in presidential elections. Later in the year, a special session was called and the legislature voted to ratify the 19th Amendment, mandating women's suffrage. The first four women in the Legislature joined the Minnesota House in 1923: Mabeth Hurd Paige, Hannah Kempfer, Sue Metzger Dickey Hough, and Myrtle Cain. The first woman in the Minnesota Senate, Laura Emelia Naplin, joined the body in 1927.

Some progress was made on civil rights in the nonpartisan era. Native Americans in the state had their citizenship restored with the passage of the federal Indian Citizenship Act of 1924. In 1921, following the high-profile lynching of three men in Duluth, the legislature made lynching a felony, even as similar legislation failed at a national level. In 1953, the legislature outlawed racial covenants in zoning laws after the U.S. Supreme Court struck them down as unconstitutional. At the height of the Civil Rights movement in 1967, the legislature passed the Minnesota Human Rights Act, a comprehensive law protecting people regardless of race, color, creed or national origin from discrimination in accommodations, education, employment, public services, and union membership. The law was amended multiple times in subsequent years to include other protected classes such as sex, marital status, disability, and sexual orientation.

=== Legislative reforms and modernization ===
In 1970s, the political structure of Minnesota saw significant changes. Following the culmination of the redistricting debate in 1972, the requirement for nonpartisan elections was removed for subsequent legislative elections, with the first partisan elections of the modern era held in 1974 for the House and 1976 for the Senate. In 1971, the legislature created a commission to study the state constitution to determine if there were any necessary amendments and to modernize any antiquated language. A revised constitution was adopted in 1974. In 1972, the role of lieutenant governor was changed from an office elected in its own right to one jointly elected with the governor. Lieutenant governors were removed from the position of President of the Senate, which became a role elected by senators. The calendar of legislative sessions was also changed to its current form: regular sessions can take place annually between January and May of every year, but they cannot meet for more than 120 legislative days over the biennium.

A notable piece of legislation from this period was the "Minnesota Miracle of 1971," which transformed the state's education system. The legislation, pushed by Governor Wendell Anderson, restructured the tax collection system, increasing state funding to public schools in order to provide financial security for school districts while lowering property taxes.

B. Robert Lewis became the first African American man elected to the Minnesota Senate in 1972. In 1974, fellow state senator Allan Spear came out as one of the first openly gay elected officials in the country. He served in the body for nearly 30 years and was elected President of the Minnesota Senate in 1993.

In 1979, Republican Representative Bob Pavlak was removed from the House near the end of the session after the State Supreme Court found him guilty of unfair campaign practices in the previous election. The House had been evenly split (67-67) between the DFL and Republican parties during the 1979-80 session, and a tenuous power sharing agreement had been formed to allow the chamber to operate smoothly. Per House rules, Pavlak was unable to vote on the matter, and the motion to declare his seat vacant passed on a party-line vote of 67 to 66. Republicans argued that the vote was unconstitutional because it required a two-thirds majority to expel a member, while DFL members argued that they were not expelling Pavlak but vacating the election returns, which only required a majority vote. In the special election to fill the vacancy, Pavlak lost to DFL candidate Frank Rodriguez Sr., cementing DFL leadership for the remainder of the session.

In 1984, the legislature ordered that gender-specific pronouns be removed from state laws. After two years of work, the rewritten laws were adopted. In the state laws, only 301 of 20,000 pronouns were feminine. "His" was changed 10,000 times and "he" was changed 6,000 times.

=== Recent history ===
==== Early 2000s ====
Former professional wrestler Jesse Ventura won the 1998 gubernatorial election under the banner of the newly formed Reform Party. He did not have a political party base in the legislature, and he later advocated to change the legislature to be unicameral, but the concept did not obtain widespread support. Ventura was succeeded by Republican governor Tim Pawlenty, who served from 2003 to 2011 with a legislature that was either majority-DFL or split between parties throughout his two terms.

In 2001, the newly elected Representative Neva Walker made history as the first African American woman to serve in the Minnesota Legislature.

In 2004, the legislature ended its regular session without acting on a majority of its planned legislation, largely due to political divisiveness on issues including education and the state's first attempt at a same-sex marriage ban. The legislature failed to pass a proper budget, and major anticipated projects such as the Northstar Corridor commuter rail line were not approved. Governor Tim Pawlenty, an opponent-turned-advocate of the line, was expected to request a special session. He instead coordinated other funds to continue the development of the line. The lack of action in the 2004 session is said to be one reason why a number of Republican House members lost their seats in the 2004 election. The Democratic–Farmer–Labor (DFL) minority grew from 53 to 66 and the Republican majority was reduced from 81 to 68. The Senate was not up for election that year, so the DFL was able to maintain its five-seat majority there. Senator Sheila Kiscaden of Rochester, formerly an elected Republican, was an Independence Party member until December 2005, when she began caucusing with the DFL. The DFL majority increased to six senators when Kiscaden announced her re-affiliation with the DFL in preparation to run for lieutenant governor on a ticket with Kelly Doran.

The Minnesota Constitution specifies that the legislature must adjourn its regular by the first Monday following the third Saturday each May, and only can re-adjourn by special session. In 2005, the regular session ended without passage of an overall budget, and a special session was subsequently called by governor Tim Pawlenty. By the end of the fiscal year on June 30, the legislature still hadn't passed a budget, so much of the government shut down for the first time in the state's history. Some essential services remained in operation and some departments received funding by legislation. A compromise budget was approved and signed into law two weeks later.

==== 2010s ====
After Mark Dayton was elected governor in 2010, the DFL controlled the governor's office, while the legislature regularly changed in partisan makeup. Legislative control was split in all but one legislative session from 1991 to 2022.

In 2011, the DFL held the governorship in Mark Dayton, while the Republican party held a majority in both houses of the legislature. The legislature again failed to pass a budget by the deadline, with Republicans advocating for tax cuts and the governor demanding some funding increases, and another shutdown occurred from July 1 to July 20, 2011, when the legislature and governor coordinated an agreement. In the 2012 elections, the DFL won a majority of both houses, giving them the first trifecta of any party the state had seen since the 1980s. The Republican Party's losses were attributed in part to the shutdown and to two ballot amendments, one on voter ID and another on same sex marriage.

==== 2020s ====
The 2022 general election saw the DFL maintain the governorship and the House, while regaining control of the state Senate by a single seat. This produced the first DFL legislative trifecta since 2014. Under Senate Majority Leader Kari Dziedzic and Speaker of the House Melissa Hortman, the DFL used the trifecta to pass a long list of statutes in what Governor Tim Walz claimed was the "most productive session in Minnesota history," nicknamed "Minnesota Miracle 2.0" in some outlets. Legislation passed included codifying abortion rights, universal free school meals, mandatory paid family and medical leave, and recreational cannabis legalization. This session also marked the first time Black women served in the State Senate with Zaynab Mohamed, Erin Maye Quade, and Clare Oumou Verbeten. Quade and Verbeten are also the first openly LGBTQ women to serve in the Senate.

The results of the 2024 election left the Minnesota House tied with 67 members elected from each major party, only the second time in history this has occurred. During negotiations for a power sharing agreement, the results of two races faced legal challenges. The election of DFLer Curtis Johnson was nullified due to a residency challenge, requiring a special election. Another race, between DFL Brad Tabke and Republican Aaron Paul had shown a number of ballots had gone missing due to human error and a recount had shown the margin between candidates was only 15 votes, however the call for a special election in this case was denied. The results of these lawsuits resulted in Republicans gaining a temporary legislative majority. Governor Walz called for a special election to be held in January 2025 in order to minimize the amount of time Republicans would have the majority, but the Minnesota Supreme Court ruled that he issued the call prematurely. The power sharing negotiations broke down, and the 2025 session began with a stalemate. The DFL members of the House boycotted the opening day of session, denying quorum, while the Senate proceeded as usual. House Republicans met anyways, arguing that the vacancy changed the number required to meet quorum, and elected Representative Lisa Demuth as Speaker of the House. The state supreme court ultimately agreed that quorum had not been achieved, and as such, Demuth's election as Speaker was invalid. After three weeks of negotiations, a power sharing agreement was reached in which Demuth would retain the title of Speaker, while Melissa Hortman held a special role as DFL Leader. Demuth has the distinction of becoming the first Black person to lead the chamber.

The 2025 shootings of Minnesota legislators on June 14 resulted in the death of Representative Melissa Hortman, the former speaker and then-DFL Leader, and the wounding of DFL Senator John Hoffman.

== Qualification and terms ==
The Senate currently has 67 seats and the House has 134 seats. Each Senate district is split into two nested House districts with an A or B title (e.g., Senate District 1 contains House Districts 1A and 1B). The Minnesota Constitution forbids House districts that are within more than one Senate district.

To serve in the legislature, a member must be at least 21 years of age and eligible to vote in the state. They must also have resided in Minnesota for at least a year and in the district for at least six months prior to their election.

Representatives are elected to two-year terms. Senators are elected to four-year terms in years ending in 2 and 6 and two-year terms in years ending in 0. Unlike the United States Senate, which staggers the election of their membership, the entirety of the Minnesota Senate is up for election every time. There are no term limits.

== Legislative process ==
The legislature meets between January and the first Monday following the third Saturday in May each year, not to exceed 120 legislative days per biennium. Since 2025, a legislative day is defined as a day in which a bill passes a third reading, a rule is adopted, or some other legislative task is completed such as the confirmation of an appointment or the overriding of a veto. The governor can call special sessions of the legislature outside of the normal schedule. During a special session, the legislature can only debate and vote on legislation prescribed in the governor's call, but there is no time limit on how long the special session can last. While most special sessions only last a few days, the longest took place from May through October of 1971.

A majority of members in each chamber are required to make quorum, based on the total number of seats.

The Minnesota Constitution spells out certain limitations on what legislation can be passed by the legislature. For example, all bills for raising revenue must originate in the House of Representatives, general banking laws require a two-thirds supermajority to pass, no legislation can be passed on the final day of a legislative session, and each piece of legislation must be on a single subject.

At the start of each session, the chambers are responsible for electing their own leadership. In the House, this includes the Speaker of the House. Since 1972, the Senate has elected a President of the Senate. The speaker and president are responsible for ruling on point of order, recognizing members for debate, and assigning legislation to different committees.

If a member wishes to introduce a bill, they work with the Office of the Revisor of Statutes to ensure that its content meets legal standards. After the bill is prepared, they submit it to the chamber leadership who will then introduce the bill on the floor and assign it to a committee.

Committees play an important role in the legislative process as essentially all legislation must go through them. Membership of the committees is split proportionally between the majority and minority parties, with each party proposing their own list of appointees to the committee. Standing committees may also introduce bills as if they were a bill author. The committees debate bills and recommend their passage or rejection by the full body.

In the House, after a bill is passed out of committee, it is placed in the general register until it is placed on the Calendar of the Day by the Committee on Rules and Legislative Administration. Once a bill is on the Calendar of the Day, it must be considered, but the order in which bills on the calendar are considered is determined by the Speaker. During this time, each bill can be debated and amended before it is put before the body for a final vote. The House also has a fiscal calendar, created by the Ways and Means Committee or Taxes Committee, which covers bills that fall under their purview.

In the Senate, after a bill is passed out of committee it goes before a Committee of the Whole, where it is debated and amended by the full body before it is placed on the daily Calendar for a final vote.

If the two chambers pass different versions of the same bill, then a conference committee is formed of equal membership from each chamber who work out the differences between the legislation. The conference committee issues a report which then goes before each chamber for another vote on whether to accept any amendments.

If a bill is passed during session, the governor has three days to sign or veto the law. If a bill is passed within the final three days of the session, then the governor has 14 days. The governor, unlike the US president, can use a line-item veto on individual aspects of appropriation bills. The legislature can overturn a veto with a two-thirds majority vote in both chambers. If the governor does not sign or veto a bill, it becomes law when the deadline for gubernatorial action passes.

=== Television broadcasts ===
When the legislature is in session, proceedings of both houses are broadcast on television via the Minnesota Channel and online at the legislature's website. The Minnesota House YouTube channel is "MNHouseInfo". The Minnesota Senate YouTube Channel is "Minnesota Senate Media Services".

== Compensation ==
For most of Minnesota's history, the salaries of Minnesota legislators were prescribed by law. In 2016, voters passed a constitutional amendment to create a Legislative Salary Council, made up of members appointed by the governor and the chief justice of the Supreme Court, which determines members' compensation.

As of 2025, the annual salary in both houses is $51,750, along with lodging reimbursements and per diems. Leadership positions are eligible for higher pay.

== Gallery ==
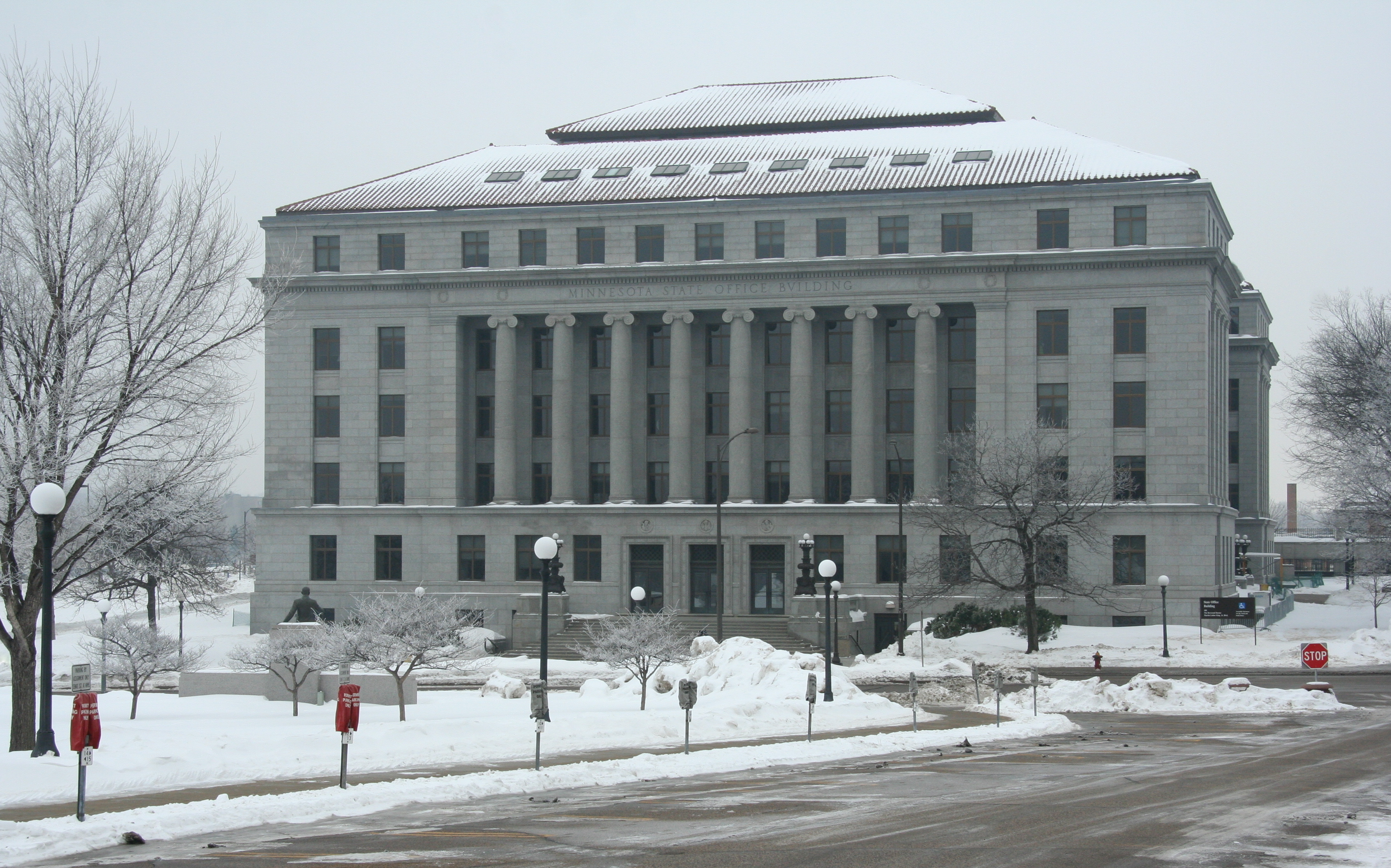
The State Office Building, where members of the Minnesota House of Representatives have offices, adjacent to the Capitol. Currently under renovation

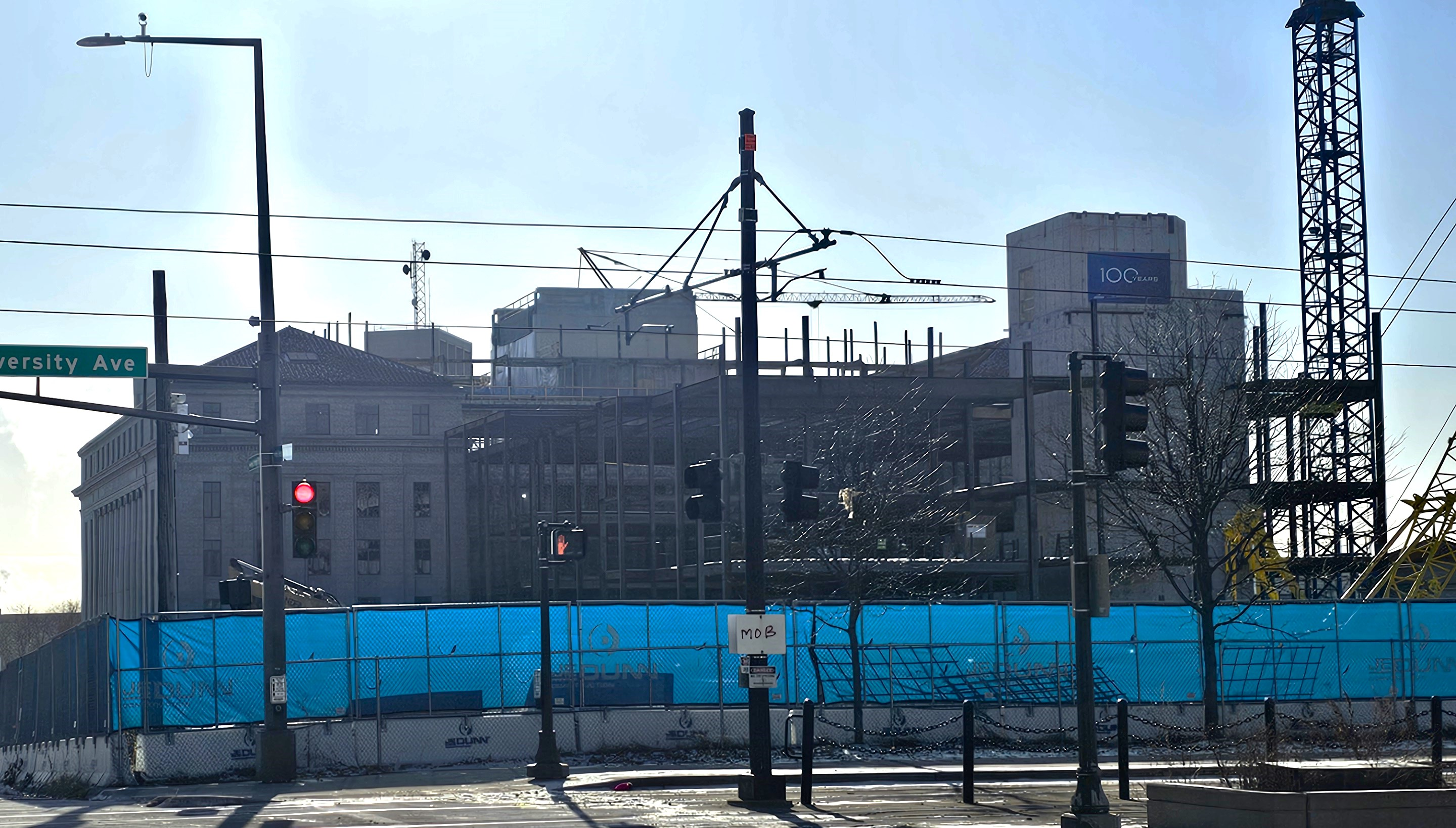
The State Office Building, under construction. It is scheduled to re-open in 2027. 166,000 square feet will be added.

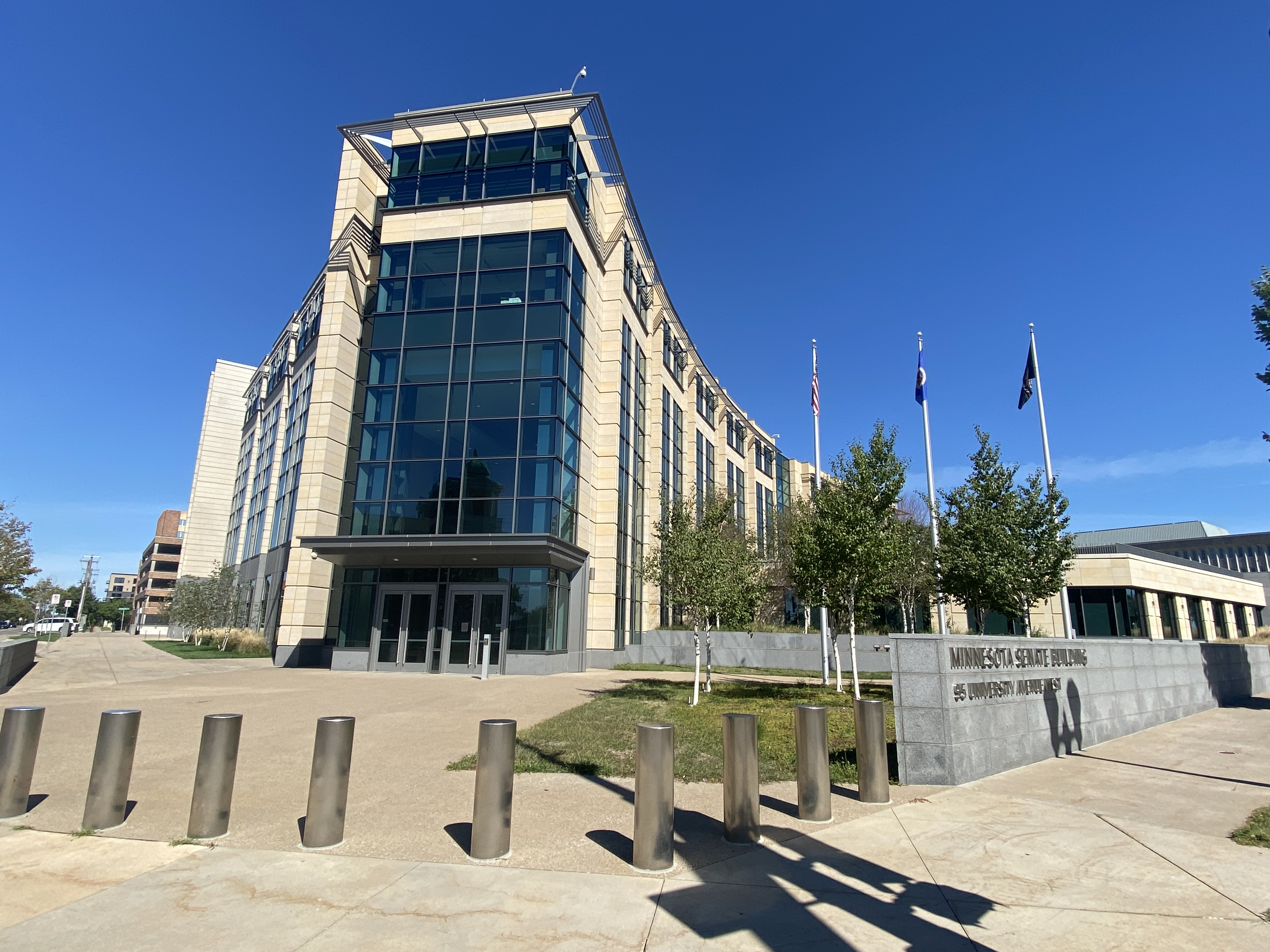
Minnesota Senate Building, completed 2015, where members of the Minnesota Senate have offices and hold hearings. Connected to the capitol by tunnel

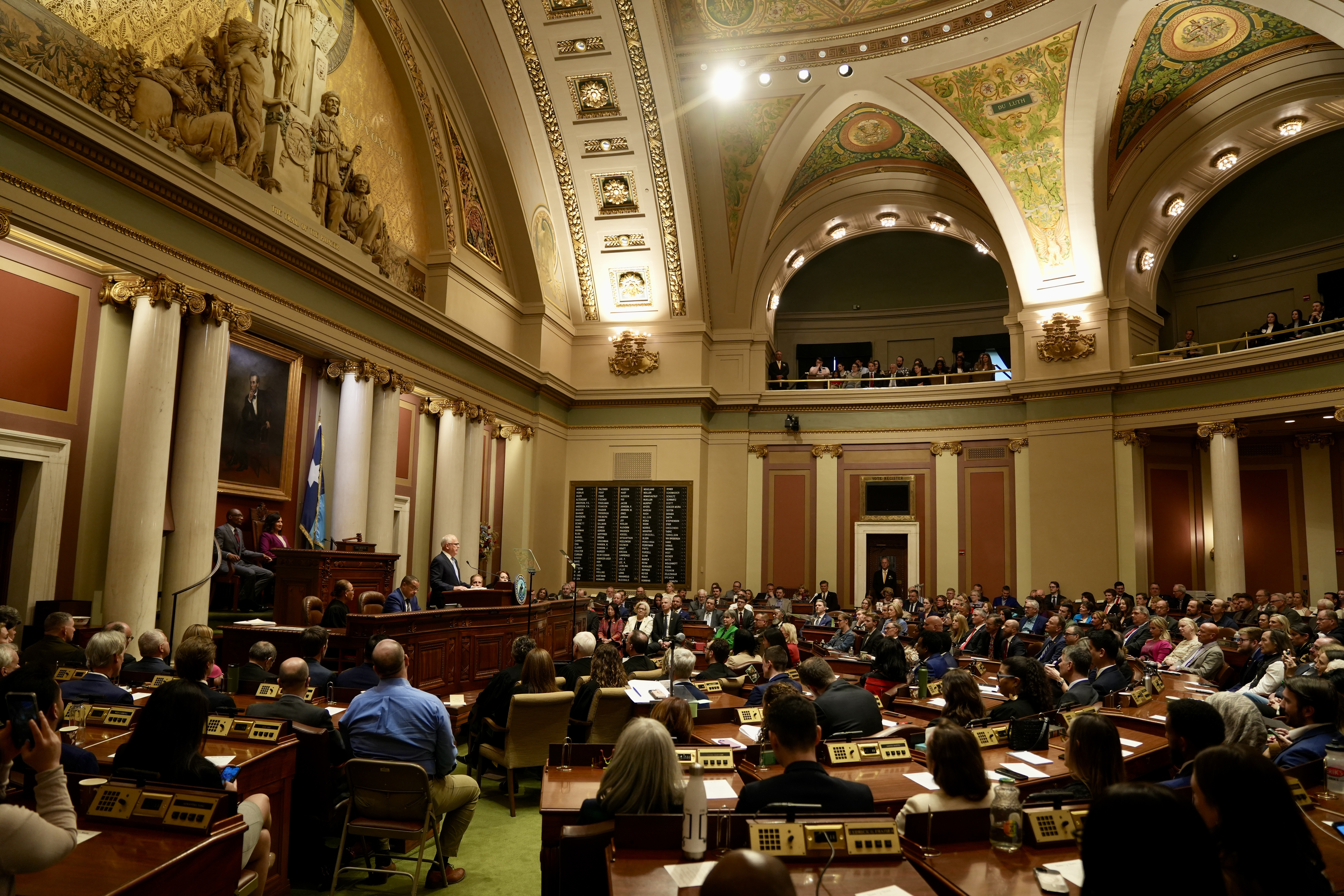
Members of both houses of the 94th Minnesota Legislature in the House chambers, during the State of the State address in 2025

== See also ==
- List of Minnesota state legislatures
- Minnesota Territorial Legislature
