= Women in Minnesota government =

Women have held a variety of positions within the government of Minnesota but still remain underrepresented. For instance, Minnesota has never had a woman as governor.

== Executive Branch ==
18 women have served in the executive branch in Minnesota. Their roles in the executive branch have included Lt. Governor, Auditor, Attorney General, Secretary of State, and Treasurer. The first woman elected to the executive branch was Virginia Holm in 1952 as Secretary of State. Eight women have served as Lt. Governor, five as Auditor, one as Attorney General, three as Secretary of State, and one as Treasurer.

== Legislative Branch ==
There have been 281 women elected to the legislative branch. The first time women were elected to the state legislature was in 1922. Four women were elected: Myrtle Agnes Cain, Sue Metzger Hough, Hannah Jensen Kempfer, and Mabeth Hurd Paige. They were all elected to the House. The first woman elected to the state Senate was Laura Emelia Naplin in 1927. Neva Walker was the first woman of color to be elected to the Minnesota state legislature.

== Judicial Branch ==
The first woman to serve on the Supreme Court was Rosalie E. Wahl in 1977. Since then, 10 other women have served on the Court. The first woman to become Chief Justice of the Supreme Court of Minnesota was Kathleen Blatz in 1998. The appointment of Justice Sandra Gardebring in 1991 made Minnesota have the first female majority state Supreme Court in the country. Wilhelmina M. Wright was the first woman of color appointed to the court in 2012.
