= 1858 Minnesota Amendment 1 =

1858 Minnesota Amendment 1 was a legislatively referred constitutional amendment, which amended the Minnesota Constitution to allow the state to issue bonds to fund the construction of railroads, with an aggregate limit of $5,000,000. The measure was one of two that appeared on the ballot of Minnesotan voters on April 15, 1858. It was accepted by 78.80% of voters. The election was held following the ratification of the constitution, but before statehood became official on May 11, 1858.

It was repealed by 1860 Minnesota Amendment 1 two years later.

== Results ==
To authorize $5 million railroad loan
Choice	Votes	%
For	25,023	78.80
Against	6,733	21.20
Total	31,756	100.00

== See also ==
- History of rail transportation in the United States
