= 2016 Minnesota Amendment 1 =

Minnesota Amendment 1
- November 8, 2016
- Legislator Pay Compensation Council

Results
Choice	Votes	%
Yes	2,265,835	80.86%
No	536,272	19.14%
Valid votes	2,802,107	94.40%
Invalid or blank votes	166,174	5.60%
Total votes	2,968,281	100.00%
Yes
90–100%
80–90%
70–80%
60–70%
50–60%
No
90–100%
80–90%
70–80%
60–70%
50–60%
Other
Tie
No data
Results by county

2016 Minnesota Amendment 1 was a legislatively referred constitutional amendment to Section 9 Article IX of the Minnesota Constitution to establish an independent council to set salaries for members of the Minnesota Legislature. It was approved by 76.33% of all voters, and 80.86% of voters who voted on this amendment voted 'yes'.

The amendment called for a compensation council of sixteen to decide the pay for legislators, with one half of members appointed by the governor of Minnesota and one half appointed by the chief justice of the Supreme Court of Minnesota, with no party composing more than 50% of seats. No members of the council may be current or former legislators, or current or former lobbyists. The council meets every odd-numbered year.

The amendment was introduced on May 6, 2013, and passed on May 19, 2013.

The question on the ballot read "Shall the Minnesota Constitution be amended to remove legislators' ability to set their own salaries, and instead establish an independent, citizens-only council to prescribe salaries for legislators?"

== Results ==
Choice	Votes	% of total votes	% of valid votes
Yes	2,265,835	76.33	80.86
No	536,272	18.07	19.14
Blank votes	166,174	5.60	
Total	2,968,281	100.00	
Eligible voters/turnout	3,972,330	74.72	
Source: Minnesota Secretary of State
