= 2011 Minnesota state government shutdown =

Government shutdown

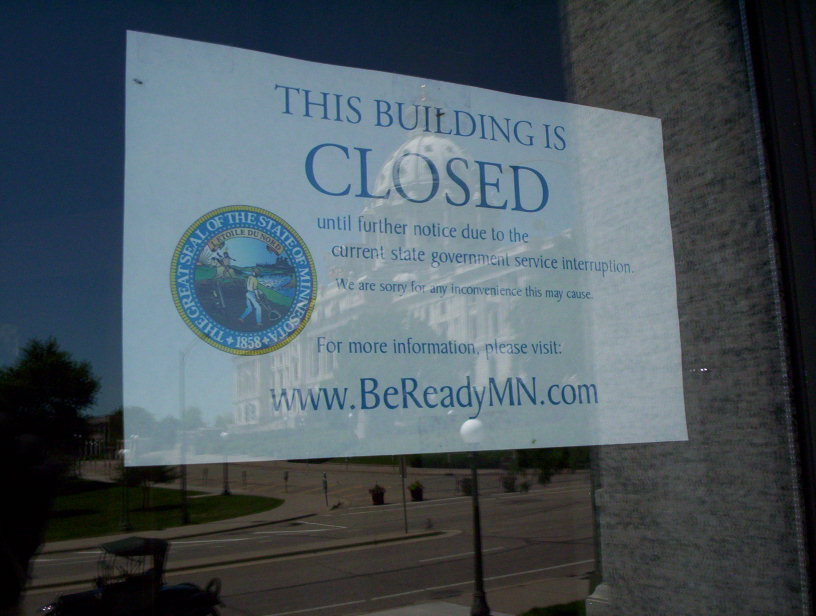
Sign in the doorway of the State Office Building, across the street from the Minnesota State Capitol

The 2011 Minnesota state government shutdown was a government shutdown affecting the U.S. state of Minnesota. The shutdown was the result of a fiscal dispute between the Democratic–Farmer–Labor Party (DFL) Governor Mark Dayton and the Republican-majority Minnesota Legislature, that was not resolved by the constitutional deadline on June 30. The Republican caucuses and their leaders demanded bigger spending cuts, and for the budget shortfall to be met without tax increases, while Dayton demanded some tax increases. The shutdown started at midnight on July 1, and ended after a budget bill was passed and signed on July 20.

During the shutdown all less important parts of the state government, that were not identified as critical services before the shutdown or in several court cases, suspended their operations. Most state government services were identified as critical or otherwise allowed to continue, so as much as 80 percent of state government spending continued. The eventual budget agreement started to form after Governor Dayton announced on July 14 that he would "reluctantly" pass the last proposal of the Republican legislative leadership before the shutdown, but with conditions. The shutdown was disruptive to the government and some Minnesotans, but its ultimate economic impact was minimal. Politically, it could have influenced the Republican electoral defeat in the 2012 state elections, although there were other factors that may have been more important.

== Background ==
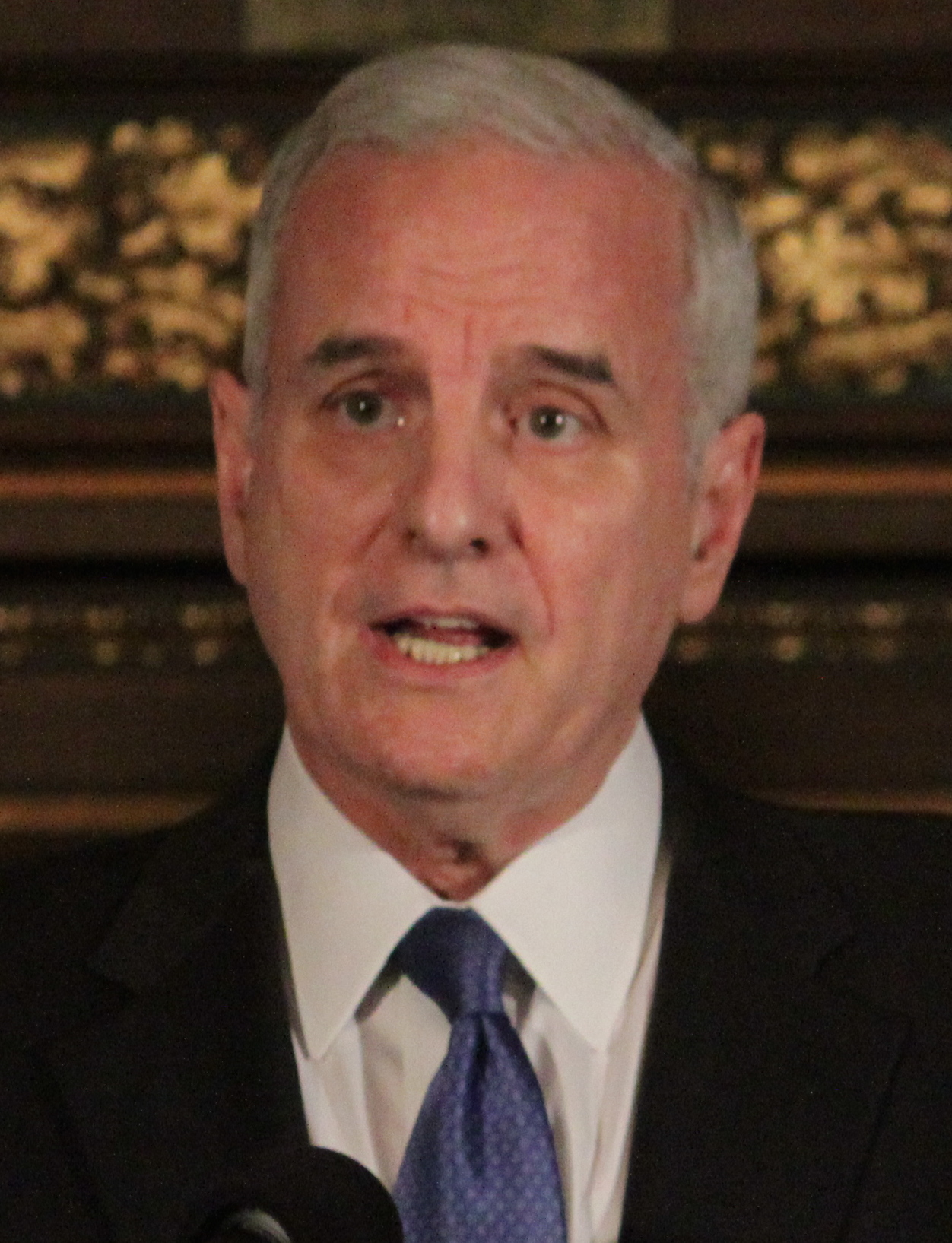
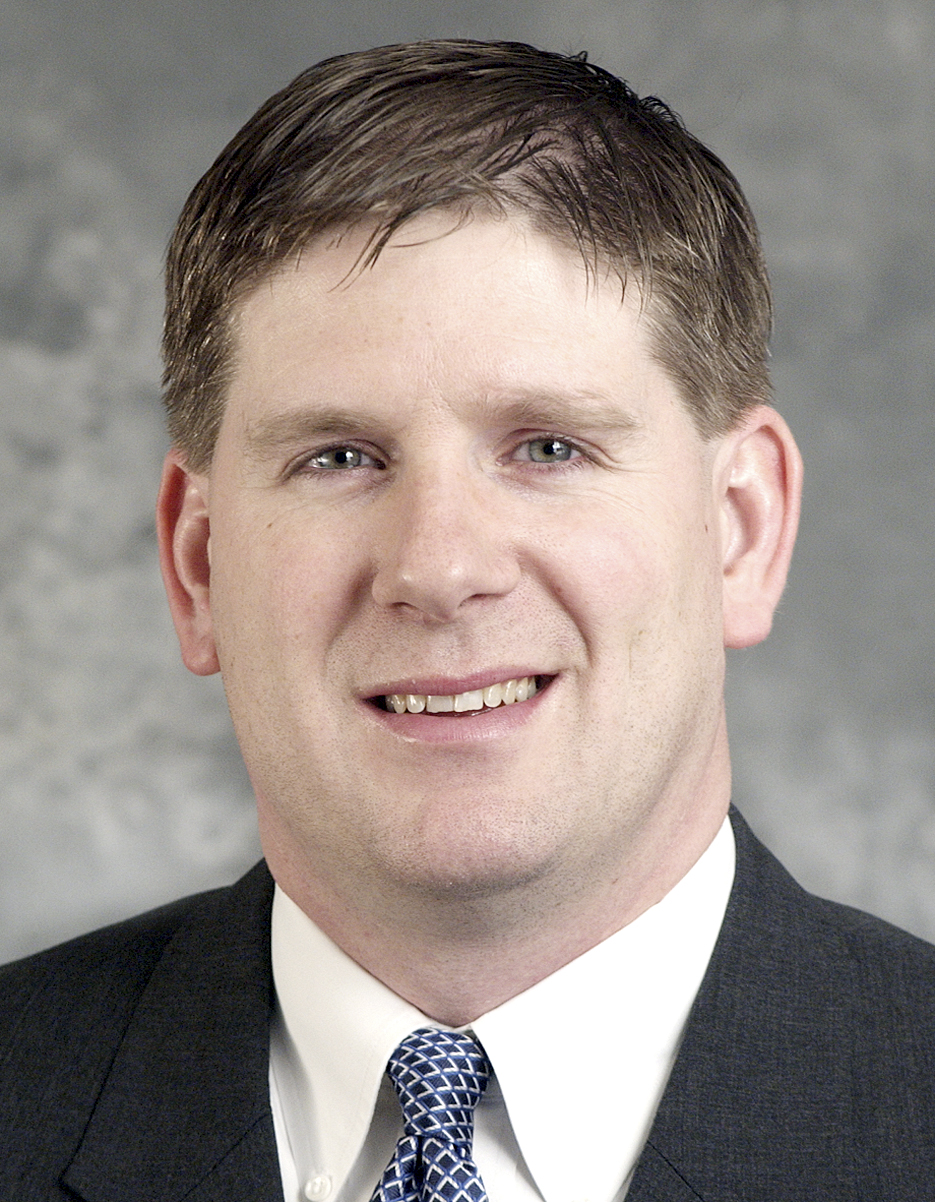
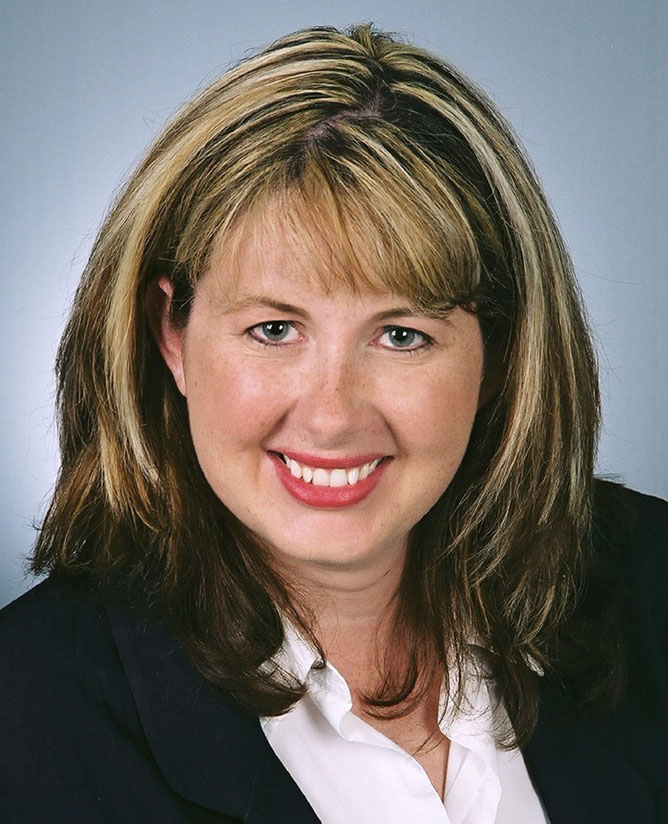
The key leaders (left to right): Governor Mark Dayton (DFL), Speaker of the House Kurt Zellers (R), and Senate Majority Leader Amy Koch (R)

Going into the 2010 state elections, the Minnesota government faced an approximately $5 billion budget shortfall in the coming 2011–2013 biennium, left over from the outgoing administration of Republican Governor Tim Pawlenty. The Republican Party claimed that the shortfall was a result of unsustainable increases in spending, and pledged to balance the budget without raising taxes. In the gubernatorial election, former U.S. Senator Mark Dayton campaigned pledging to close the budget deficit by increasing income taxes on the state's highest earners.

The Republicans won control of both houses of the legislature for the first time in decades, while Dayton narrowly defeated Republican candidate Tom Emmer with 44% of the vote. Many of the newly elected Republican legislators were affiliated with the Tea Party movement and had more anti-government positions than the Republican establishment. Both Dayton and Republican legislators claimed a popular mandate for their positions.

Minnesota's state government cannot operate without appropriations under law, as mandated by the Minnesota Constitution. However, state courts have determined that Priority One and Two Critical Services must continue in the event of a shutdown. Services that must remain uninterrupted to avoid a potential immediate threat to public health or safety are considered Priority One, and some additional services are designated Priority Two. Before the shutdown, a list of priority services was compiled and prepared by Minnesota Management and Budget, based on recommendations from state agencies.

Since Minnesota had divided governments for decades before 2010, a number of past budgets had brought the state close to a shutdown, and there had been one shutdown before in state history. After Governor Pawlenty and the Republican-majority House could not agree on a budget with the DFL-majority Senate in 2005, the state government went through a nine-day shutdown.

== Preceding budget negotiations ==
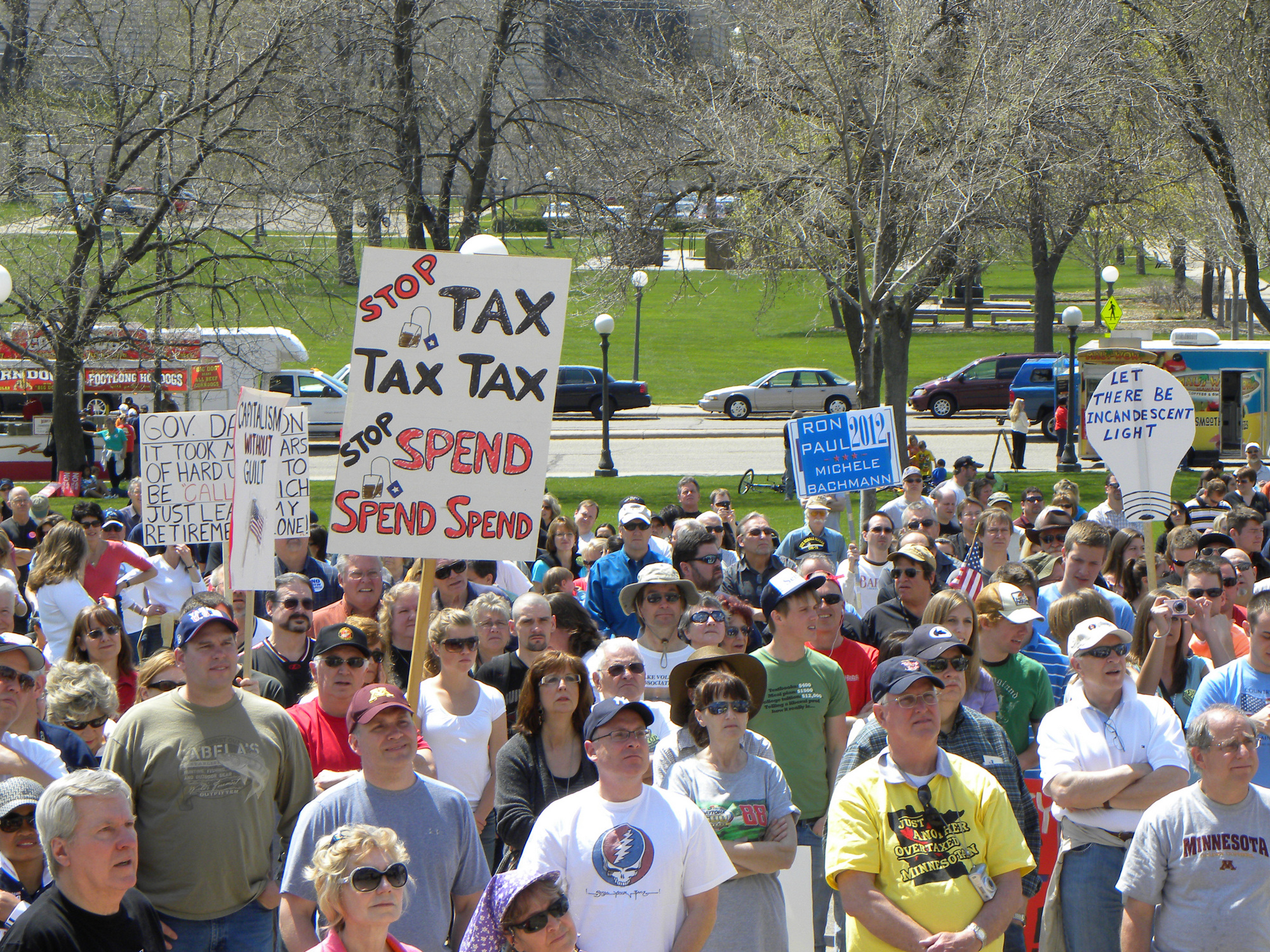
Protesters at the Republican Party's "Tax Cut Rally" on May 7

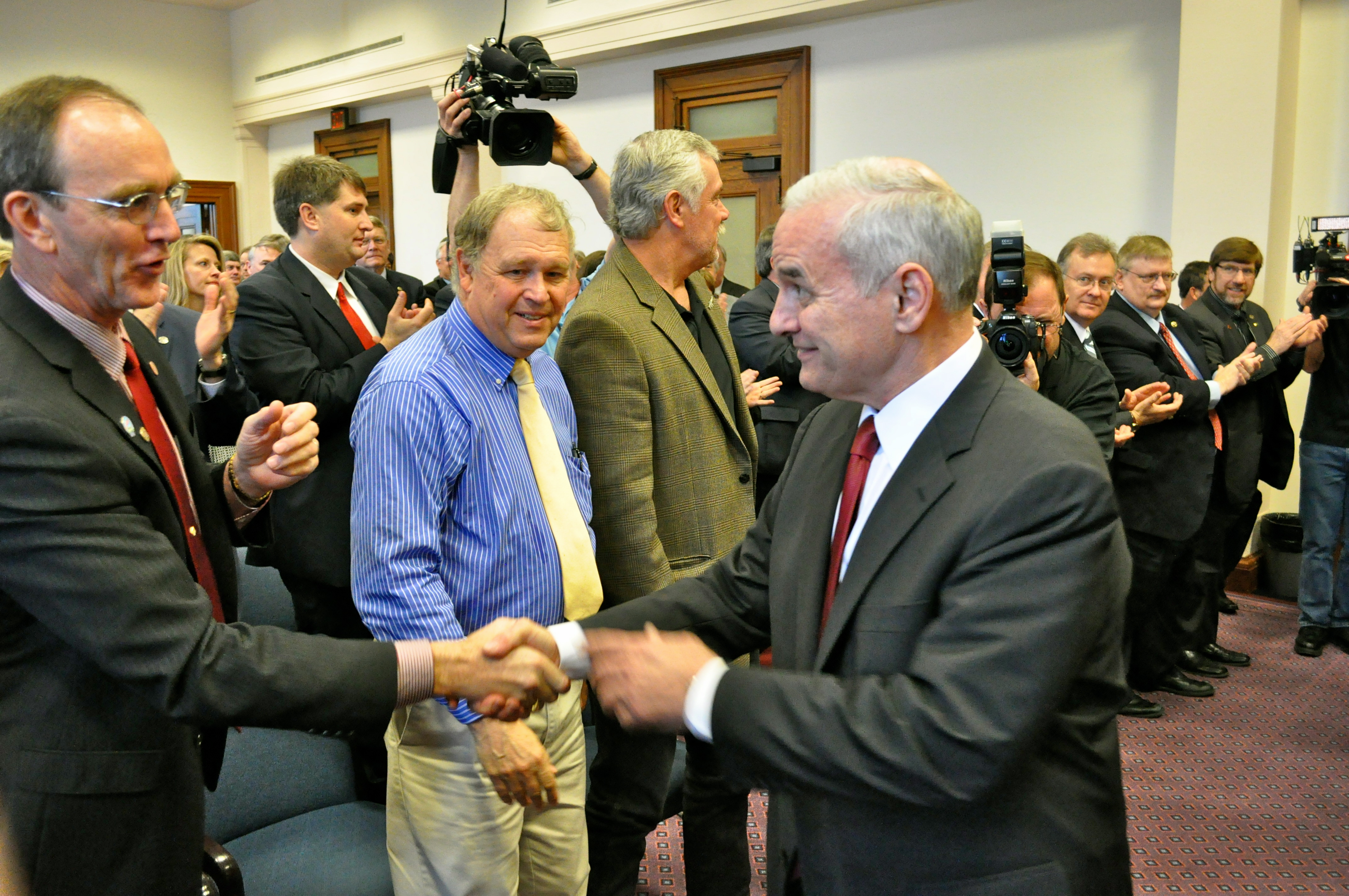
Dayton meeting with Republican legislators from both houses, on May 19

Governor Dayton formally proposed a state budget on February 15, calling for $37 billion in state spending, necessitating cuts of about 10 percent to most state agencies. Because the state was projected to take in only about $32 billion in taxes, the rest of the budget shortfall was covered by increases to income and property taxes for wealthier Minnesotans, as he had promised during his campaign. Meanwhile, Republican legislators, led by House Speaker Kurt Zellers and Senate Majority Leader Amy Koch, demanded the budget be kept below $32 billion.

As negotiations went on during the legislative session, Dayton suggested compromise budget frameworks ultimately reducing his proposed budget to $35.8 billion, but insisted that he would go no further and that Republicans were not amenable enough to compromise. The legislature passed budget bills that balanced the budget with significant cuts to social and infrastructure services, rather than raising any taxes. They described their budget as a compromise with the DFL after the state's revenue forecast was revised upward, as it called for $34 billion in state spending increased from $32 billion. Dayton claimed that the impasse was the doing of "extreme right-wing" freshman Republican legislators whom he did not talk to, and that he had cordial relationships with Republican leaders. In a statement at the end of the session on May 23, Dayton said "Here I am in the middle — and they haven't moved". Republicans, including Koch and other legislative leaders, consistently insisted they would not accept a budget of over $34 billion, citing polls suggesting public opinion was on their side. During the session, the Republican Party held a rally calling for tax cuts at the State Capitol on May 7. Protesters supporting Dayton's tax increases and opposed to the Republicans, many from public employee unions, gathered at the capitol multiple times, including at the end of the session.

By the day after the regular session ended, Dayton had vetoed all of the budget bills passed by the legislature, and said in a statement that he anticipated a shutdown would occur. Dayton did not call a special session of the legislature to further address the budget during May or June, claiming that the lack of agreement between him and Zellers and Koch would make it unproductive to do so. He remained in contact with legislative leaders, sticking by the $35.8 billion budget he proposed late in the session, with minor changes. As the end of June approached, Koch urged the governor to call a session to pass a temporary 'lights-on' bill while a final deal was reached, but he refused to answer this proposal on the grounds that extending the budget's deadline would not serve the goal of reaching a final agreement. Since the budget impasse had not ended by the end of June 30, the shutdown began at midnight of June 30–July 1, 2011.

== Shutdown ==
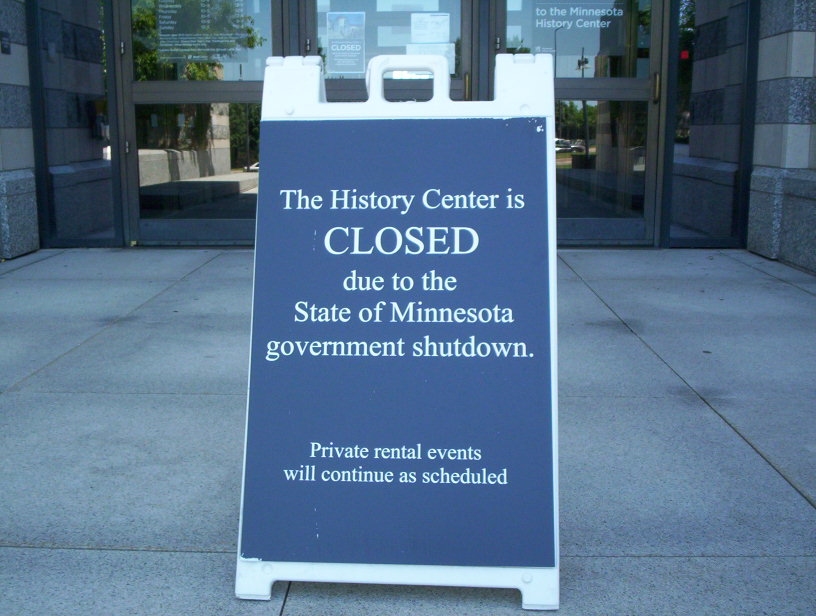
Sign announcing the shutdown in front of the Minnesota History Center

At that time the shutdown began, all state government spending and operations not considered to be critical stopped. Suspended state services included driving tests, childcare assistance, senior and disability linkage lines, criminal background checks, and road construction. State government offices, state parks, highway rest areas, and sites run by the Minnesota Historical Society, among others, closed. The commissioner of the Department of Human Services, Lucinda Jesson, said that letters had to be sent to over 580,000 households that relied on the department for social services to notify them about the possible shutdown. More critical parts of the state government, including public safety, health care, benefit payments, and care for residents of state facilities continued. Services that were continued during the shutdown could have amounted to as much as 80 percent of state spending.

During the first days of the shutdown, many programs requested that their funding continue, especially social service organizations that relied on state funding. To hear their pleas, the courts appointed retired State Supreme Court judge Kathleen Blatz as a special master. Dayton and State Attorney General Lori Swanson also both submitted petitions to the Ramsey County District Court when the shutdown began, asking for the court to clarify whether some programs could continue. Judges Kathleen Gearin and Bruce W. Christopherson issued their rulings on July 7, finding that some programs could start again, including criminal background checks, public schools, and local government aid. Gearin complained that the governor and legislature should have been responsible for making decisions about which services could stay open. Gearin had previously heard a case from the Minnesota Zoo, which asked to remain open despite the shutdown, and another from the Canterbury Park horse racing track in Shakopee. While both pay for themselves at least during the summer, Gearin determined that only the Zoo was allowed to operate without legislative appropriations, so she allowed the Zoo to open on July 2 but ordered Canterbury Park to remain closed the same day.

== Effects ==
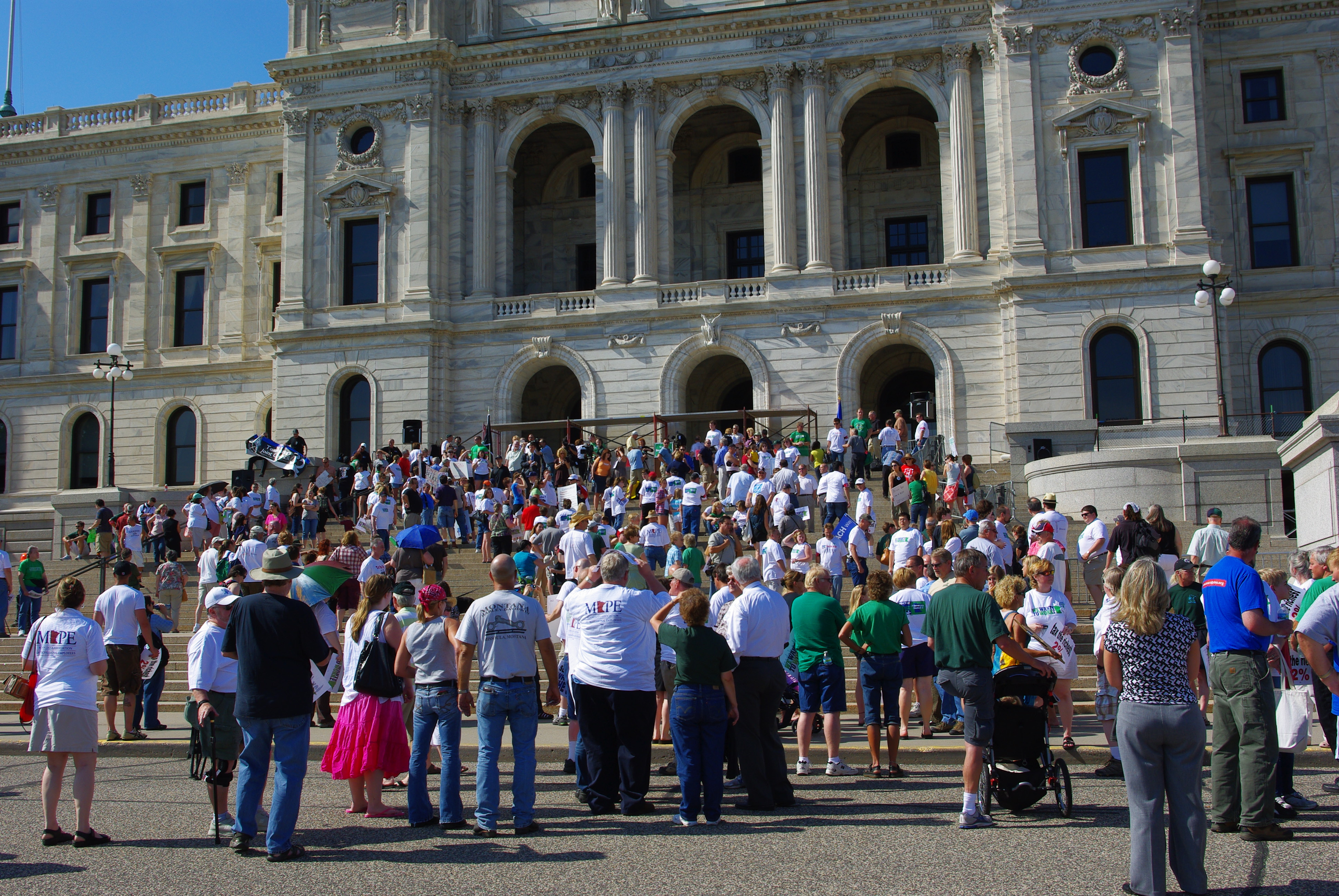
Protesters at a rally organized by Minnesota Association of Professional Employees (the main public employee union in Minnesota) and other labor unions, on July 6

During the shutdown, some 19,000 state employees were laid off. State and federal government employees in Minnesota lost approximately $65 million in wages over the course of the shutdown. Because of court rulings, some of the 36,000 state employees who received layoff notices leading up to the shutdown continued or returned to work during the shutdown. Laid-off employees were immediately eligible for unemployment benefits, and continued to receive health insurance, costing the state millions a week. (However, Minnesota Unemployment Insurance has a waiting week, so laid off workers were only eligible to collect unemployment for two weeks.)

In addition to the costs associated with staff, Minnesota lost some revenue during the shutdown. The Minnesota State Lottery did not sell tickets during the shutdown, which meant the state could have lost about $1.25 million in revenue daily. Minnesota stopped selling tax stamps for cigarettes, which must be affixed to each pack before sale. The Star Tribune reported that cigarette sales would come to a halt by mid-August if no more tax stamps were issued. The state also stopped issuing liquor purchasing cards, which businesses need in order to purchase liquor from wholesalers. Many stores, bars, and restaurants renewed their liquor purchasing cards before the shutdown. However, the purchasing cards for approximately three hundred establishments expired on the first day of the shutdown, July 1. Liquor purchasing cards would have continued to expire on the first day of each month. Alcohol brand licenses expired, so MillerCoors lost their license to sell 39 brands of beer in Minnesota, and had to have them removed from shelves.

While public schools remained open during the shutdown, and teachers continued to be paid following Gearin's ruling, the shutdown interfered with their operations, and would have caused serious problems if it had continued. Teachers could not renew or receive new licenses during the shutdown, creating a backlog, and property tax levy approvals could have been delayed. No fishing, hunting, and boating licenses or new drivers' licenses were issued during the shutdown. Taxes continued to be due, but tax refunds stopped.

Services for state parks stopped, including roads, making them mostly accessible only by foot, and causing a number of problems. An official for the Department of Natural Resources told the Pioneer Press that visitors were relieving themselves on trails in Gooseberry Falls State Park, as the restrooms were closed, and that uncollected garbage attracted bears in Crow Wing State Park. Vandalism occurred at Afton State Park, where the main office was "ransacked" and a group of twelve "ripped off shingles and pieces of deck for firewood, burned additional furniture and wrote messages bragging about breaking in for free". While many state-run attractions were closed during the shutdown, institutions not part of the state government stayed open. Museums such as the Science Museum of Minnesota reported an increase in visits, as did county parks and attractions in neighboring states.

In an arson case at the former home of Governor Dayton near Lake Harriet in Minneapolis, police were "investigating the possibility that someone [was] upset over last week's shutdown".

In total, about $48 million in revenue was lost, and over $10 million was spent on expenses related to preparing for and recovering from the shutdown. Overall, the shutdown disrupted the state government's activities, the lives of some Minnesotans (especially the most vulnerable), and private sector work such as road construction, but had minimal impact on the larger economy of the state.

== Budget agreement ==
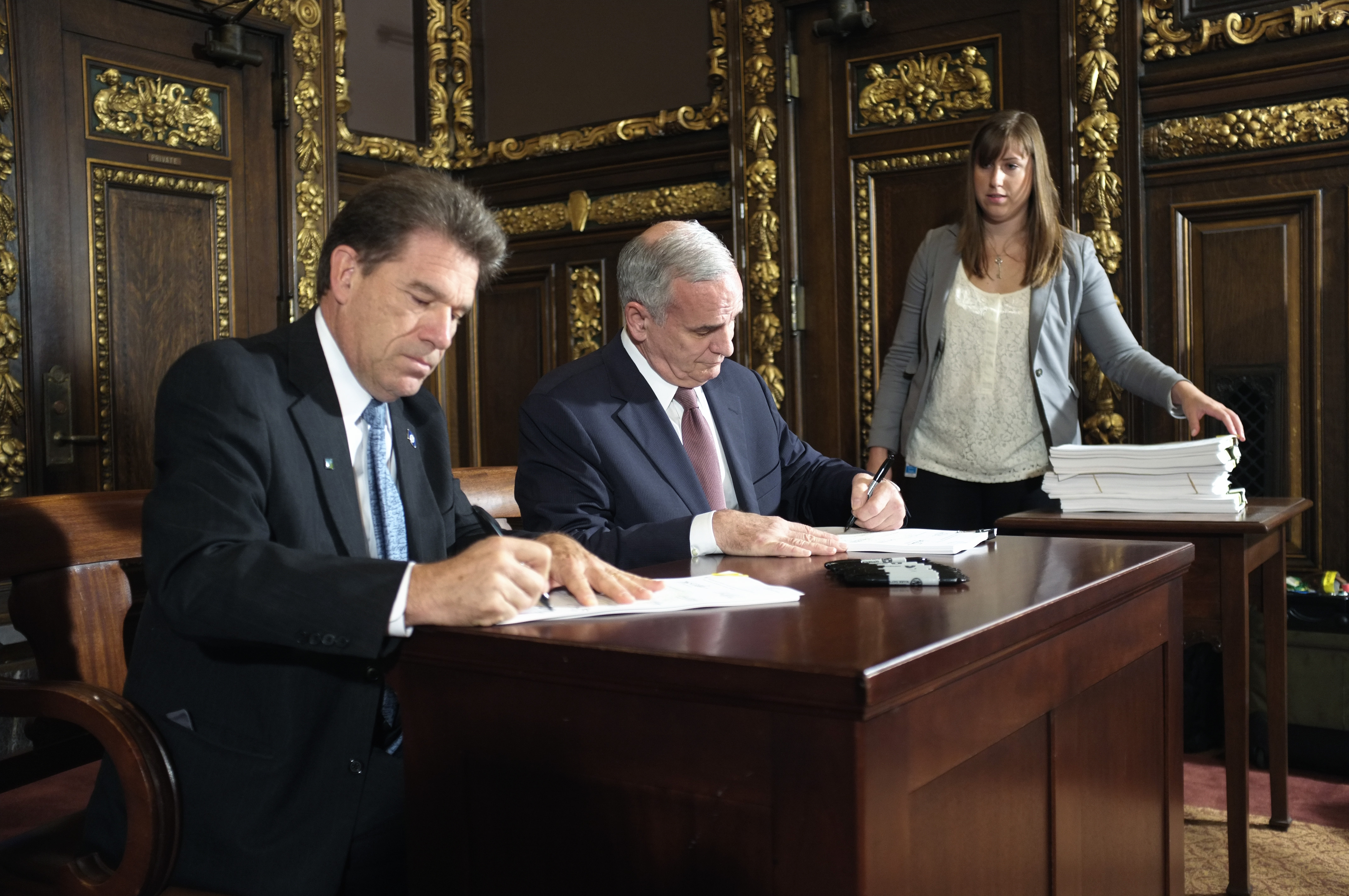
Dayton signing the budget legislation that ended the shutdown on July 20

For the first two weeks of the shutdown, there was little progress and neither the governor nor the Republican leaders made proposals accepted by the other side. On July 4, Republican lawmakers affirmed their commitment to not agree to a budget of over $34 billion. Documents leaked after June 30 stated that the Republican leadership included anti-abortion provisions, a voter ID requirement, and a ban on stem cell research during the budget negotiations. Both the Republican legislative leaders and Dayton (along with DFL legislative leaders) toured Minnesota to make their case to Minnesotans. The government shutdown ended after Governor Dayton announced on July 14 that he would accept the last Republican offer before the shutdown, albeit with certain conditions.

The Republican offer called for an approximately $35 billion budget and no tax increases, and relied on delaying the payment of some K-12 school aid and issuing bonds against future tobacco revenue to cover the remaining gap. It differed from the previous Republican proposals in several provisions, particularly increasing the K-12 per-student formula by $50 per year to cover additional borrowing costs, adding $10 million to the University of Minnesota budget to equalize Minnesota State Colleges and Universities cuts, and restoring funding to the Department of Human Rights and the Trade Office. Dayton's conditions were that measures on social issues such as abortion be dropped from the budget, 15 percent reductions to state employees in all agencies be dropped, and a $500 million infrastructure construction bonding bill.

When a final agreement was reached with the Republican legislative leadership, Dayton called a special session of the legislature on July 19. The legislature met on July 20 and passed the budget bills, which were signed the same day by the governor. Most state employees returned to work on July 21, facing a backlog of unfinished work and new problems in many agencies. After the budget was passed, Dayton said he approached Republicans again after meeting with ordinary citizens—who said they wanted government services to resume and did not care how the shutdown was ended—and because he feared a worse budget deal and unease in the DFL legislative minorities. Zellers said when the deal was finalized that in his view it was "a deal that we can all be disappointed in, but a deal that is done, a budget that was balanced". His sentiments that a 'balanced' budget needed to be passed, and that both sides had something to be unhappy about, were echoed by Koch.

== Political influence ==
According to a MinnPost poll, Minnesotans blamed the Republican legislature more for the shutdown. Overall, 42% said Republicans in the legislature were more responsible, 21% said the DFL governor was more responsible, and 22% volunteered an answer that they were equally to blame. As expected, partisans blamed the other party more; only 10% of Republicans blamed the legislature more, and only 2% of DFLers blamed Dayton more. Following the shutdown, DFL Representative Phyllis Kahn authored a continuing appropriations bill that would prevent government shutdowns in the event of disagreements between the governor and legislature, as she had done in several past sessions. The House commissioned a policy brief from its research department, published in December 2011, that looked into what such a bill would require. The brief noted that such ideas had been considered before, including after the 2005 shutdown, and had been abandoned.

In the state elections of 2012, during which all members of the legislature (but not the governor) were up for election, the shutdown was a major campaign issue. The Republicans lost their majorities in both houses of the legislature, giving the DFL full control of the state government. Kurt Zellers and other Republican legislators said the shutdown probably was one reason for their electoral defeat. However, other national and state issues may have had more of an influence on the result. The presidential race was also on the ballot, as were the proposed Minnesota Marriage Amendment and Voter ID Amendment, which had been put on the ballot by the legislature in 2011. All of these ballot items increased the turnout of DFL-leaning voters.

After winning control of the state legislature, the DFL passed a $38 billion budget containing the tax hikes on the wealthy that Dayton had wanted in 2011. The shutdown still was a political issue in the 2014 elections, when gubernatorial candidates Zellers and Dave A. Thompson were among the candidates for statewide office who had been Republican legislators during the shutdown. Zellers claimed having "balanced the budget without a tax increase" during the shutdown was his signature accomplishment as speaker, but he was criticised by Republican rivals and DFL leaders alike for the shutdown and for the means by which the budget was balanced.
