= 1858 Minnesota Amendment 2 =

1858 Minnesota Amendment 2 was a legislatively referred constitutional amendment, which amended Section 7 Article 5 of the Minnesota Constitution to allow for all elected state officials to take office and begin state government on May 1, 1858, and defined terms for the state's executive offices.

The measure was one of two that appeared on the ballot of Minnesotan voters on April 15, 1858. It was accepted by 78.80% of voters. The election was held following the ratification of the constitution, but before statehood became official on May 11, 1858. The amendment was written by acting governor Charles L. Chase.

The text of the amendment read as follows;

The term of each of the Executive officers named in this Article, shall commence on taking the oath of office Amendment on or after the first day of May, 1858, and continue until the first Monday of January, 1860, except the Auditor, who shall continue in office until the first Monday of January, 1861, and until their successors shall have been duly elected and qualified; and the same above-mentioned time for qualification and entry upon the duties of their respective offices shall extend and apply to all other officers elected under the State Constitution, who have not already taken the oath of office and commenced the performance of their official duties.

== Results ==
For amendment to Section 7 Article 5
Choice	Votes	%
For	25,023	78.80
Against	6,733	21.20
Total	31,756	100.00
