= Hannah Kempfer =

Minnesota schoolteacher and politician

Hannah Jensen Kempfer
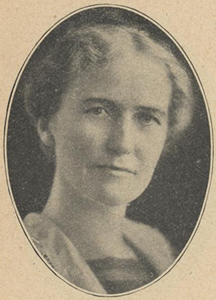

Member of the Minnesota House of Representatives from the 50th district
- In office 1923–1930; 1933–1942

Personal details
- Born: December 22, 1880 North Sea
- Died: September 27, 1943 (aged 62) Fergus Falls, Minnesota, US
- Party: Independent
- Spouse: Charles Taylor Kempfer (m. 1903)
- Occupation: Teacher, farmer, politician

Hannah Jensen Kempfer (December 22, 1880 – September 27, 1943) was a Norwegian-American schoolteacher, farmer, and politician. She was a member of the Minnesota House of Representatives from 1923 to 1930 and from 1933 to 1942, representing District 50 that covered Otter Tail County. Born on a ship in the North Sea, Kempfer was adopted by a Norwegian family that immigrated to the United States in 1885. Her family settled in Minnesota and squatted a piece of railroad land where she grew up in poverty. She became a teacher at a small rural schoolhouse. Kempfer was one of the four women first elected to the Minnesota legislature in 1922 after women's suffrage. As a legislator, she championed the rights of children and fought for the conservation of natural resources. She introduced legislation to protect the Showy Lady's slipper, Minnesota's state flower.

== Early life and education ==
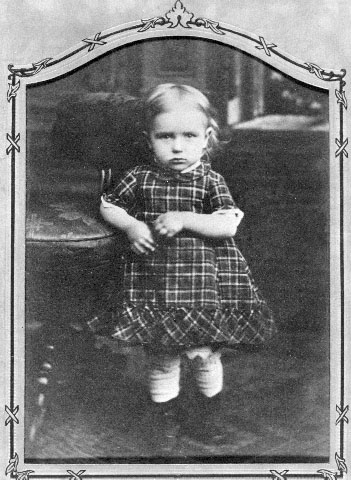
Johannah Josephine Jensen in Stavanger, Norway (circa 1883)

Johannah Josephine was born on December 22, 1880, in the North Sea on a ship sailing under a British flag. Her father was a sailor and her mother an unwed stewardess. Her mother left her in Stavanger, Norway, where she was taken to an orphanage. Ole and Martha Jensen, a shipbuilder and his wife who had recently lost their only child, adopted Johannah in March 1881. The Jensens immigrated to Adams, Minnesota, in 1885 where they stayed with relatives.

In 1889, the Jensens moved to Otter Tail County and, being very poor, squatted a piece of property that belonged to the railroad. When Johannah Josephine was 12, she took the train to Fergus Falls to find work. She was taken in by the family of a milkman. She attended both Fergus Falls High School and Park Region Luther College in Fergus Falls. A teacher shortened her name to Hannah.

== Career and personal life ==
At 17, she tested for her teaching certificate and became a teacher in Friberg Township. She began serving hot lunches there and her school became known as "Hot Soup School". She taught from 1898 to 1908 and paid off her debts, buying the land her family had been living on. She also worked as a correspondent for the Fergus Falls newspaper Wheelock's Weekly.

She married Charles Taylor Kempfer, a farmer, on May 23, 1903 and moved to his parents' farm. They never had children of their own, but were foster parents for eleven children that had been orphaned. Kempfer was active in her community, helping to form a farm improvement club and organizing church socials and quilting bees. When a tornado tore through Fergus Falls, she helped organize a relief effort.

== Minnesota House of Representatives ==
Following success of the women's suffrage movement that achieved passage of the Nineteenth Amendment to the Constitution of the United States in 1920 granting women full voting rights, Kempfer was encouraged by her friends and neighbors to run for the Minnesota Legislature. In 1922, Kempfer filed to run for the seat in Minnesota House of Representative's 50th District. She ran as an independent, even refusing an endorsement from the Nonpartisan League. She campaigned throughout the county, traveling in a Ford Model T. In November she was elected as one Minnesota's first four woman legislators alongside Mabeth Hurd Paige, Sue Metzger Dickey Hough and Myrtle Cain. She became friends with Paige, who assisted her financially. She was the first woman elected to the Legislature from rural Minnesota, hailing from Erhard. Otter Tail County returned her to the House nine times, from 1923 to 1930 and from 1933 to 1942. During legislative sessions, she lived in Saint Paul in a shared apartment on lower Summit Avenue. She was the first woman to serve as the honorary speaker in the Minnesota House of Representatives after being so appointed on January 28, 1925.

Kempfer supported numerous conservation measures throughout her political career. She and Mabeth Hurd Paige introduced legislation in 1925 that protected the Showy Lady's slipper, Minnesota's state flower. She chaired the Committee on Game and Fish and in 1927 supported a measure that introduced Minnesota's first fishing license fee. Kempfer was criticized for her support of the unpopular measure. While she was re-elected in 1928, she lost her seat in 1930. Her niece later attributed the loss to the fishing license law. She also spearheaded a drive to prohibit the use of steel traps on publicly owned lands.

During her time in the legislature, Kempfer advocated for the welfare of children. In 1923, she joined her fellow women legislators and introduced a bill extending rights to children born out of wedlock. In a speech on the floor of the House, she remarked, "A child should not be punished for what is no fault of his own. I want to do all I can to improve the lot of these poor children because I am one of them. I am an illegitimate child." In 1930, Kempfer was invited to Washington, D.C., for the White House Conference on Child Health and Protection where she met President Herbert Hoover and First Lady Lou Henry Hoover.

Following the repeal of prohibition of alcohol, she supported local-option laws and the issue came up repeatedly in her subsequent campaigns.

== Later life and death ==
Kempfer fell and fractured her hip on July 14, 1943, at her home in Erhard. She died at the Fergus Falls hospital on September 27, 1943 due to complications from a tumor which was too close to her aorta to be removed via operation. She is interred at Tonseth Lutheran Church Cemetery in Friberg Township.

== See also ==
- Minnesota Woman Suffrage Association
