= 1860 Minnesota Amendment 1 =

1860 Minnesota Amendment 1 was a legislatively referred constitutional amendment, which amended the Minnesota Constitution to repeal 1858 Minnesota Amendment 1. The amendment would require popular approval of railroad bonds for their issuance, and also removed the $5,000,000 aggregate limit set in 1858. The amendment was passed overwhelmingly with 96.17% of the vote.

== Results ==
Choice	Votes	%
For	18,648	96.17
Against	743	3.83
Total	19,391	100.00

== See also ==
- History of rail transportation in the United States
