= 1998 Minnesota Amendment 1 =

Minnesota Amendment 1
- November 3, 1998

Results
Choice	Votes	%
Yes	1,570,720	77.24%
No	462,749	22.76%
Valid votes	2,033,469	96.59%
Invalid or blank votes	71,874	3.41%
Total votes	2,105,343	100.00%

1998 Minnesota Amendment 1 was a legislatively referred constitutional amendment. The amendment amended Article XIII of the Minnesota Constitution to officially recognize hunting and fishing as important pieces of cultural heritage, and that they shall be forever preserved by the government by managing them in the interest of the public good. The amendment was accepted with 77.24% of the vote.

The bill was passed to be on the November ballot by the legislature, with the support of governor Arne Carlson, on April 4, 1998.

The question on the ballot read: "Shall the Minnesota Constitution be amended to affirm that hunting and fishing and the taking of game and fish are a valued part of our heritage that shall be forever preserved for the people and shall be managed by law and regulation for the public good? "

== Results ==
Choice	Votes	%
For	1,570,720	77.24
Against	462,749	22.76
Total	2,033,469	100.00
