= Mabeth Hurd Paige =

American politician

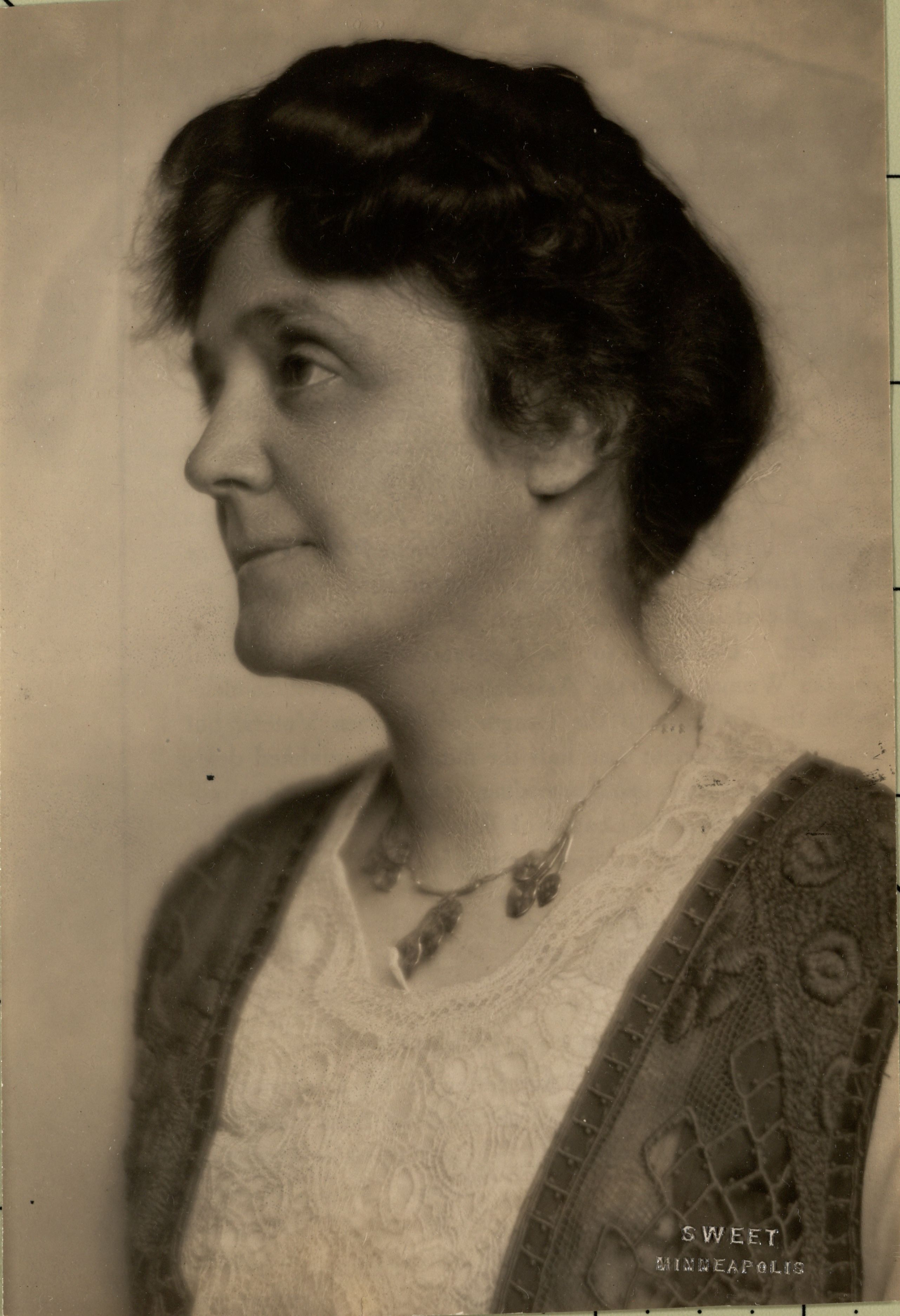
- Mabeth Hurd Paige, ca. 1920s

Member of the Minnesota House of Representatives from the 30th district
- In office 1923–1945

Personal details
- Born: Mabeth Hurd; November 22, 1869 Newburyport, Massachusetts
- Died: August 19, 1961 (aged 91) Minneapolis, Minnesota
- Party: Republican
- Spouse: James Paige
- Children: Elizabeth
- Education: University of Nebraska; Massachusetts Art School; Académie Julian; University of Minnesota Law School

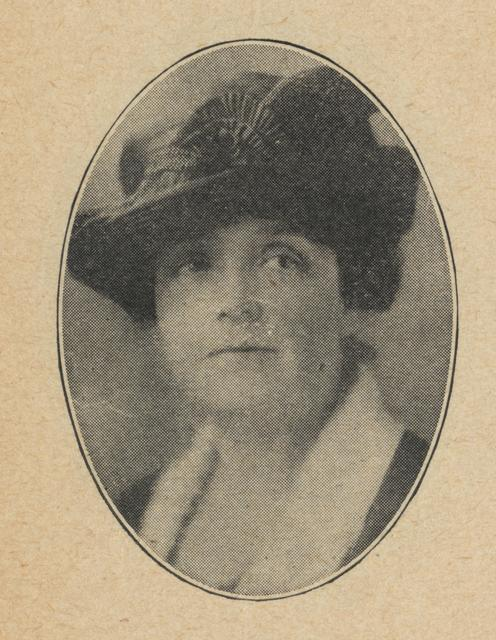
Representative Mabeth Hurd Paige, 1923-1924 Legislative Session, Minnesota Legislature.

Mabeth Hurd Paige (November 22, 1869 – August 19, 1961) was a Minnesota politician, a member of the Minnesota House of Representatives from 1923 to 1945.

== Biography ==
Mabeth Hurd was born in Newburyport, Massachusetts, in 1869, and educated there through high school. After graduation, she went to Nebraska to take care of her grandmother and attend the University of Nebraska. She then attended the Massachusetts Art School in Boston and studied at the Académie Julian in Paris, France.

When she returned to the United States in 1891, Hurd moved to Minneapolis and accepted a job teaching art in the Minneapolis public schools. In 1895 she married James Paige, a professor of law at the University of Minnesota. James encouraged Mabeth to obtain a law degree which she did, at the university.

In 1914 Paige was asked to become president of the Women's Christian Association in Minneapolis that ran a boarding and rooming house for women. She was the founder of the Minneapolis chapter of the Urban League and was a board member for 25 years. She raised money for the Phyllis Wheatley Settlement House.

In 1922 Paige filed for the office of Representative of the 30th Legislative District of the State of Minnesota. In November she was elected as one Minnesota's first four-woman legislators, alongside Hannah Kempfer, Sue Metzger Dickey Hough, and Myrtle Cain. Her district, which covered part of downtown Minneapolis to the North Side up to about Lowry Avenue, returned her to the House in every election year until she retired in 1945.

As the chair of the public welfare and social legislation committee, she introduced bills that outlawed "loan sharks" charging high interest rates that she believed helped keep people in poverty. She also passed bills that shortened the work week for girls and women who worked 10–13 hours each day seven days a week. She also appropriated money to build a University of Minnesota mental hospital and to take care of orphans. Other legislation that Paige introduced outlawed "counterfeit correspondence schools" and protected the environment.

In 1949, at the state centennial banquet commemorating Minnesota's admission as a state, the Minnesota Junior Chamber of Commerce named Mabeth Paige as one of eight women among the Hundred Living Great Minnesotans.

She noted women's working and political conditions wherever she traveled. "My observations abroad brought out the need of independent citizenship for women, not be interwoven with that of men by reason of marriage or other conditions." She died in 1961, at age 91, in Minneapolis, only a few months after she voted in the 1960 national elections.
