= Erhard, Minnesota =

City in Minnesota, United States

- City
- Location of Erhard, Minnesota
- Coordinates: 46°29′01″N 96°05′47″W
- Country: United States
- State: Minnesota
- County: Otter Tail
- Platted: July 1882
- Incorporated: October 13, 1949

Government
  - Mayor: Gary Stadum

Area
  - Total: 0.567 sq mi (1.469 km^{2})
  - Land: 0.552 sq mi (1.429 km^{2})
  - Water: 0.015 sq mi (0.040 km^{2})
- Elevation: 1,286 ft (392 m)

Population (2020)
  - Total: 132
  - Estimate (2022): 131
  - Density: 239.2/sq mi (92.35/km^{2})
- Time zone: UTC−6 (Central (CST))
  - Summer (DST): UTC−5 (CDT)
- ZIP Code: 56534
- Area code: 218
- FIPS code: 27-19556
- GNIS feature ID: 2394697
- Sales tax: 7.375%
- Website: www.cityoferhard.com

Erhard (/ˈɜːrhɑːrd/ Air-hard) is a city in Otter Tail County, Minnesota, United States. The population was 132 at the 2020 census.

== History ==
Erhard was platted in July 1882, and named for Alexander E. Erhard, an early settler.

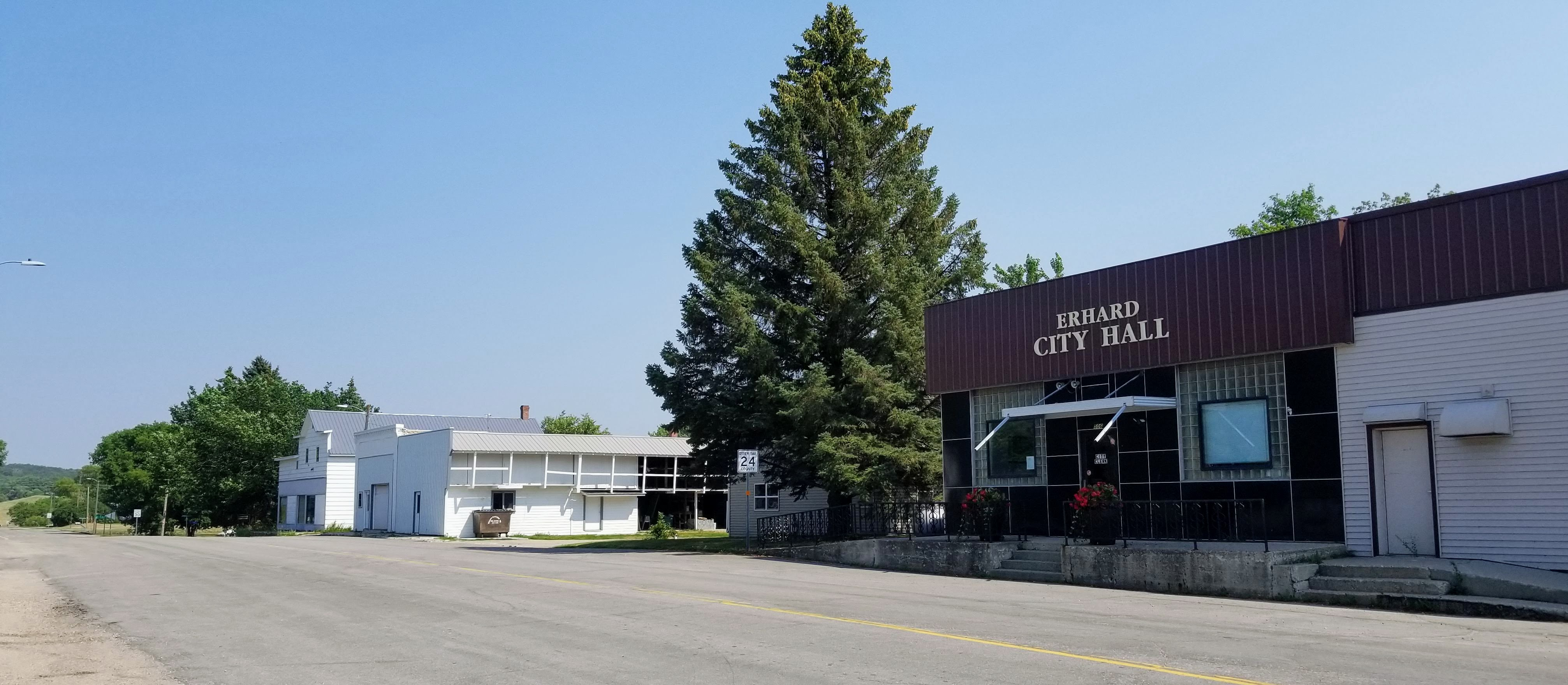
Erhard City Hall.

== Geography ==
According to the United States Census Bureau, the city has a total area of 0.567 square miles (1.47 km^{2}), of which 0.552 square miles (1.43 km^{2}) is land and 0.015 square miles (0.04 km^{2}) is water.

== Demographics ==
Historical population
Census	Pop.	Note	%±
1950	145		—
1960	150		3.4%
1970	148		−1.3%
1980	194		31.1%
1990	181		−6.7%
2000	150		−17.1%
2010	148		−1.3%
2020	132		−10.8%
2022 (est.)	131		−0.8%
U.S. Decennial Census; 2020 Census

=== 2010 census ===
As of the 2010 census, there were 148 people, 65 households, and 43 families living in the city. The population density was 274.1 inhabitants per square mile (105.8/km^{2}). There were 70 housing units at an average density of 129.6 per square mile (50.0/km^{2}). The racial makeup of the city was 98.0% White and 2.0% Native American.

There were 65 households, of which 24.6% had children under the age of 18 living with them, 52.3% were married couples living together, 12.3% had a female householder with no husband present, 1.5% had a male householder with no wife present, and 33.8% were non-families. 29.2% of all households were made up of individuals, and 12.3% had someone living alone who was 65 years of age or older. The average household size was 2.28 and the average family size was 2.67.

The median age in the city was 48 years. 23.6% of residents were under the age of 18; 6.2% were between the ages of 18 and 24; 15.6% were from 25 to 44; 35.1% were from 45 to 64; and 19.6% were 65 years of age or older. The gender makeup of the city was 48.6% male and 51.4% female.

=== 2000 census ===
As of the 2000 census, there were 150 people, 71 households, and 39 families living in the city. The population density was 276.4 inhabitants per square mile (106.7/km^{2}). There were 73 housing units at an average density of 134.5 per square mile (51.9/km^{2}). The racial makeup of the city was 98.00% White and 2.00% Native American.

There were 71 households, out of which 19.7% had children under the age of 18 living with them, 49.3% were married couples living together, 4.2% had a female householder with no husband present, and 43.7% were non-families. 38.0% of all households were made up of individuals, and 11.3% had someone living alone who was 65 years of age or older. The average household size was 2.11 and the average family size was 2.78.

In the city, the population was spread out, with 18.0% under the age of 18, 4.7% from 18 to 24, 27.3% from 25 to 44, 34.0% from 45 to 64, and 16.0% who were 65 years of age or older. The median age was 44 years. For every 100 females, there were 100.0 males. For every 100 females age 18 and over, there were 105.0 males.

The median income for a household in the city was $35,417, and the median income for a family was $37,250. Males had a median income of $20,000 versus $20,750 for females. The per capita income for the city was $16,189. There were 7.0% of families and 11.5% of the population living below the poverty line, including 23.8% of under eighteens and 12.5% of those over 64.
