= 2005 Minnesota state government shutdown =

The 2005 Minnesota state government shutdown was a government shutdown affecting the U.S. state of Minnesota, the first in the history of the state. The shutdown was the result of a fiscal dispute between the Republican governor Tim Pawlenty and House majority, and the Democratic–Farmer–Labor Party (DFL) majority in the state Senate, that was not resolved by the constitutional deadline on June 30. The Republicans and the DFL disagreed over how much would be spent on state healthcare programs and public schools, and what sources of revenue would be used for this funding.

During the shutdown, many non-essential state government programs were closed, and about 8,900 state employees were furloughed. The shutdown lasted nine days, until the legislature passed, and the governor signed, a 'lights-on' temporary authorization of spending, followed by a compromise budget agreement. In 2011, there was another government shutdown lasting 20 days.
