= 2012 Minnesota Amendment 2 =

Minnesota Amendment 2
- November 6, 2012
- Voter ID Amendment

Results
Choice	Votes	%
Yes	1,362,030	46.16%
No	1,588,752	53.84%
Valid votes	2,950,782	100.00%
Invalid or blank votes	0	0.00%
Total votes	2,950,782	100.00%

Yes
90–100%
80–90%
70–80%
60–70%
50–60%
No
90–100%
80–90%
70–80%
60–70%
50–60%
Other
Tie
No data
Results by county

2012 Minnesota Amendment 2 (also called Voter ID Amendment) was a proposed legislatively referred constitutional amendment that was on the ballot on November 6, 2012. If approved, it would have required a form of photographic identification before being permitted to vote in Minnesota municipal, state, and federal elections. However, it was defeated with 53.84% voting against and 46.16% for the measure.

== Legislative approval ==
The Minnesota Legislature approved the amendment for the ballot in April 2012 on essentially a party-line vote. The amendment was authored by multiple representatives, notably by Rep. Mary Kiffmeyer, R-Big Lake, who had formerly served as Minnesota Secretary of State. Twenty-four other representatives joined in authoring the bill, and Scott Newman was senate author.

== Support and opposition ==
Institutional support for the measure broke down largely by party, with DFL leaders opposing the amendment, and Republicans supporting it. The two most recent Secretaries of State lined up on opposite sides, with Kiffmeyer pushing for adoption, and Mark Ritchie speaking against it.

== Opinion polls ==
Date of opinion poll	Conducted by	Sample size	For	Against	Undecided/Other	Margin of error	Question
May 2–5, 2011	Star Tribune	806 adults	80%	18%	2%	±4.7%	"Please tell me if you would favor or oppose ... requiring Minnesota voters to show a photo ID in order to vote."
May 23–24, 2011	SurveyUSA	552 RV	76%	18%	1% not sure 4% not vote	±3.6%	"If an amendment to the Minnesota Constitution were on the ballot, that requires voters to present a photo ID at the polls, would you vote for the amendment? Against the amendment? Or not vote on the measure?"
June 6–8, 2011	Rasmussen Reports	1,000 LV	75%	18%	7%	±3%	"Should voters be required to show photo identification such as a driver’s license before being allowed to vote?"
January 21–22, 2012	Public Policy Polling	1,236 voters	65%	30%	4%	±2.8%	"Do you think the Minnesota Constitution should be amended to require that voters present a current and accurate driver's license, state ID, or voter ID card in order to cast a ballot, or not?"
January 31 – February 2, 2012	SurveyUSA	542 RV	70%	23%	4% not sure 4% not vote	±4%	"If an amendment to the Minnesota Constitution were on the ballot that would require voters to show photo I.D.'s in order to vote on Election Day, how would you vote?"
May 31 – June 3, 2012	Public Policy Polling	973 voters	58%	34%	8%	±3.1%	"Should the Minnesota Constitution be amended to require all voters to present valid photo identification to vote and to require the state to provide free identification to eligible voters?"
July 17–19, 2012	SurveyUSA	552 LV	65%	28%	4% not sure 2% not vote	±4.1%	"An amendment to the Minnesota Constitution on the ballot would require voters to show photo I.D.'s in order to vote on Election Day. Will you vote FOR the amendment? Against the amendment? Or not vote on the measure?"
September 6–9, 2012	SurveyUSA	551 LV	62%	31%	7%	±4.1%	"Also on the ballot is a measure about voter identification. It asks: Shall the Minnesota Constitution be amended to require all voters to present valid photo identification to vote and to require the state to provide free identification to eligible voters, effective July 1, 2013?" ?"
September 10–11, 2012	Public Policy Polling	824 LV	56%	39%	5% not sure	±3.4%	"Should the Minnesota Constitution be amended to require all voters to present valid photo identification to vote and to require the state to provide free identification to eligible voters?"
September 17–19, 2012	Mason-Dixon Polling and Research, Inc.	800 LV	52%	44%	4%	±3.5%	"The November ballot will include several proposed constitutional amendments. One asks "Shall the Minnesota Constitution be amended to require all voters to present valid photo identification to vote and to require the state to provide free identification to eligible voters, effective July 1, 2013?"
October 5–8, 2012	Public Policy Polling	937 LV	51%	43%	6% not sure 0% won't vote	±3.2%	"Should the Minnesota Constitution be amended to require all voters to present valid photo identification to vote and to require the state to provide free identification to eligible voters?"
October 12–14, 2012	SurveyUSA	550 LV	53%	40%	7%	±4.3%	"Also on the ballot is a measure about voter identification. It asks: Shall the Minnesota Constitution be amended to require all voters to present valid photo identification to vote and to require the state to provide free identification to eligible voters, effective July 1, 2013?" "
October 15–21, 2012	St. Cloud State University Survey	600 LV	55%	39%	3% not sure 3% won't vote	±5%	"This November Minnesota voters will vote on two proposed amendments to the Minnesota Constitution. One proposed amendment will ask, "Shall the Minnesota Constitution be amended to require all voters to present valid photo identification to vote and to require the state to provide free identification to eligible voters, effective July 1, 2013?" If you were to vote today, would you vote for the amendment, vote against the amendment, or not vote on this issue??"
October 23–25, 2012	Mason-Dixon Polling and Research, Inc.	800 LV	53%	41%	6%	±3.5%	"The November ballot will include several proposed constitutional amendments. One asks "Shall the Minnesota Constitution be amended to require all voters to present valid photo identification to vote and to require the state to provide free identification to eligible voters, effective July 1, 2013?" If the election were held today, would you vote YES in favor of the amendment NO against the amendment"
October 26–28, 2012	SurveyUSA	574 LV	55%	40%	5%	±4.2%	"Also on the ballot is a measure about voter identification. It asks: Shall the Minnesota Constitution be amended to require all voters to present valid photo identification to vote and to require the state to provide free identification to eligible voters, effective July 1, 2013?" "
November 1–3, 2012	SurveyUSA	556 LV	48%	48%	5%	±4.2%	"Also on the ballot is a measure about voter identification. It asks: Shall the Minnesota Constitution be amended to require all voters to present valid photo identification to vote and to require the state to provide free identification to eligible voters, effective July 1, 2013?" "
November 2–3, 2012	Public Policy Polling	1,164 LV	46%	51%	3% not sure 0% won't vote	±2.9%	"Should the Minnesota Constitution be amended to require all voters to present valid photo identification to vote and to require the state to provide free identification to eligible voters??"

== Results ==
Constitutional Amendment 2 Photo identification required for voting
Choice	Votes	%
For	1,362,030	46.16
Against	1,588,752	53.84
Total	2,950,782	100.00
Registered voters/turnout		Precincts Reporting - 100
Source: Minnesota Secretary of State - Results for Constitutional Amendments
