= Minnesota State Constitution Ratification Measure =

The Minnesota State Constitution Ratification Measure was a ballot measure held on October 13, 1857. As changes to the Minnesota Constitution require voter approval, the original adoption of said constitution had to be approved in a ballot measure. The measure passed with 98% of the vote.

Due to the many months of negotiation by both the Democratic and Republican parties, the vote was designed to ensure the negotiated constitution's approval. This was accomplished by the ballots having only one option, 'yes'. To vote against the constitution, one would have to modify the ballot to write their disapproval. The ratification measure was held simultaneously with the election of all other state constitutional offices.

== Results ==
Minnesota State Constitution Ratification Measure
| Choice | Votes | % |
|---|---|---|
| For | 30,055 | 98.14 |
| Against | 571 | 1.86 |
| Total | 30,626 | 100.00 |

== See also ==
- Territory of Minnesota
- 1857 Minnesota gubernatorial election
