= 2012 Minnesota elections =

2012 Minnesota general election
- November 6, 2012
- Turnout: 76.11%

Elections were held in Minnesota on Tuesday, November 6, 2012. Primary elections took place on August 14, 2012. The Democratic-Farmer-Labor Party (DFL) saw wins across the board, gaining a majority in both state legislative houses and flipping one congressional seat. Two Republican-supported constitutional amendments on were struck down.

== Federal ==
=== United States Senate ===
Democratic–Farmer–Labor candidate Senator Amy Klobuchar won re-election over Republican state Representative Kurt Bills.

=== United States House of Representatives ===
All eight seats of the Minnesota delegation in the United States House of Representatives were up for election in 2012. All eight incumbents were seeking re-election. The DFL won five seats, flipping District 8.

== State ==
=== Ballot measures ===
Two constitutional amendments regarding same-sex marriage and voter identification were on the ballot. Both were defeated.

=== Minnesota Senate ===
All 67 seats in the Minnesota Senate were up for election in 2012. The DFL won a majority with 39 seats.

=== Minnesota House of Representatives ===
All 134 seats in the Minnesota House of Representatives were up for election in 2012. The DFL won a majority with 73 seats.

== Local ==
Many elections for local offices were also held on November 6, 2012.
