= Myrtle Cain =

American politician

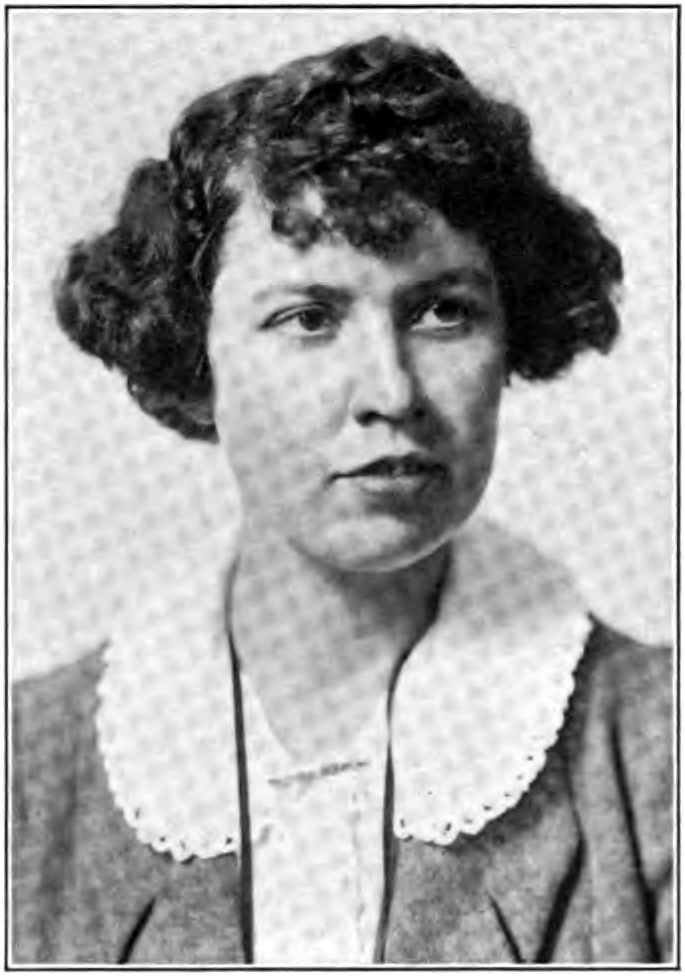
- Cain c. 1924

Member of the Minnesota House of Representatives from the 28th district
- In office January 1, 1923 – January 4, 1925

Personal details
- Born: April 11, 1894 Minneapolis, Minnesota, U.S.
- Died: February 6, 1980 (aged 85) Minneapolis, Minnesota, U.S.
- Party: Farmer–Labor

Myrtle Agnes Cain (April 11, 1894 – February 6, 1980) was an American politician and labor activist. She served as president of the Women's Trade Union of Minneapolis and was a member of the Minnesota Farmer Labor Party. In 1923 and 1924, Cain served in the Minnesota House of Representatives. Governor Wendell Anderson named February 15, 1973 "Myrtle Cain Day." She is one of 25 women recognized on the Minnesota Woman Suffrage Memorial in Saint Paul.

== Early life ==
Born in Minneapolis, Minnesota, to Irish immigrant parents, Cain went to public schools in the city and to St. Anthony's Convent. Her father was a boilermaker who was active in the Railroad Brotherhood union.

== Career ==
=== Union work ===
Cain led a strike with the Telephone Operators Union in 1918. She quickly became a leader of the Women's Trade Union League of Minneapolis, and worked in women's outreach with the American Federation of Labor. She was also a member of the League of Catholic Women.

Already involved with labor activism, Cain befriended Alice Paul, the founder of the National Women's Party which fought for the right to vote.

=== Minnesota House of Representatives ===
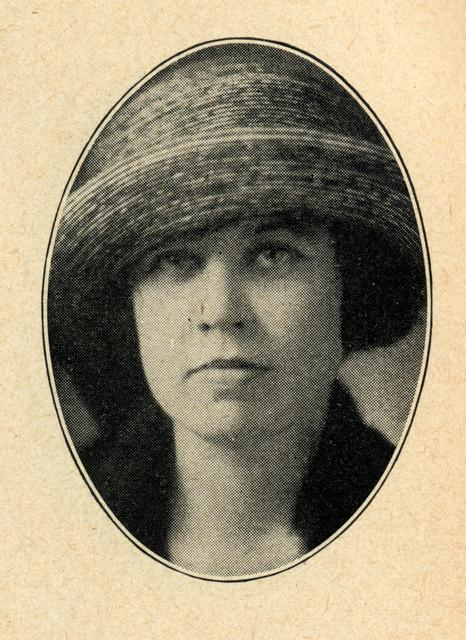
Cain's official State House portrait, 1923

After the Nineteenth Amendment was ratified and upheld in the 1922 Supreme Court case of Leser v Garnett, Cain and three other women won seats in the Minnesota House of Representatives in the 1922 election. Cain beat out three other candidates by 500 votes to win a seat in the Minnesota House. She has been known as the "flapper legislator".

During Cain's single session in office (1923-1924), she co-sponsored a bill about anti-masking, which prevented Ku Klux Klan members from wearing masks or hoods in public (House File No. 138 that became Minnesota Laws of 1923, Chapter 160). This ended up being the first of fifteen similar bills to be passed in the United States. She also authored a bill titled “Granting Equal Rights, Privileges, and Immunities to Both Sexes,” the first bill to demand equal rights for Minnesota women, which did not pass. In 1923, Cain advocated for passage of an Equal Rights Amendment to the Minnesota Constitution, but the effort ultimately failed.

Cain lost her re-election bid to a male opponent by only 39 votes.

=== Post-electoral career and activism ===
Cain moved to Washington, D.C., to lobby for women's rights, living at the National Woman's Party headquarters. She also spent time in New York City where she coordinated programming for the American Women's Association.

After her father died, Cain returned to Minneapolis. During the Great Depression, she coordinated deliveries to children whose families couldn't afford milk, and became the director of the City Wide Direct Relief Committee, connecting Minneapolis residents to resources like food, clothing, housing, and heat.

During World War II, Cain pushed for equal pay for women at the Twin Cities Army Ammunition Plant, where she worked as public relations director. She then worked for Hubert Humphrey's Minneapolis mayoral campaign. He then appointed Cain to serve as a housing consultant. She also helped to bridge the divide as the Farmer-Labor Party and Minnesota Democratic Party merged in 1944. In 1948, Cain began working on an equal rights bill in 1948 with activist Arvonne Fraser.

In 1968, Cain worked with Eugene McCarthy's presidential campaign, calling for an immediate end to the Vietnam War.

In 1973, Cain spoke at the state capitol in favor of the federal Equal Rights Amendment. Shortly after, Governor Wendell Anderson declared February 12 "Myrtle Cain Day".

== Later life and death ==
Cain died on February 6, 1980 in Minneapolis.

== Notes ==
This article incorporates text from MNopedia, which is licensed under the Creative Commons Attribution-ShareAlike 3.0 Unported License.
