= Sue Metzger Dickey Hough =

American lawyer, businesswoman and politician

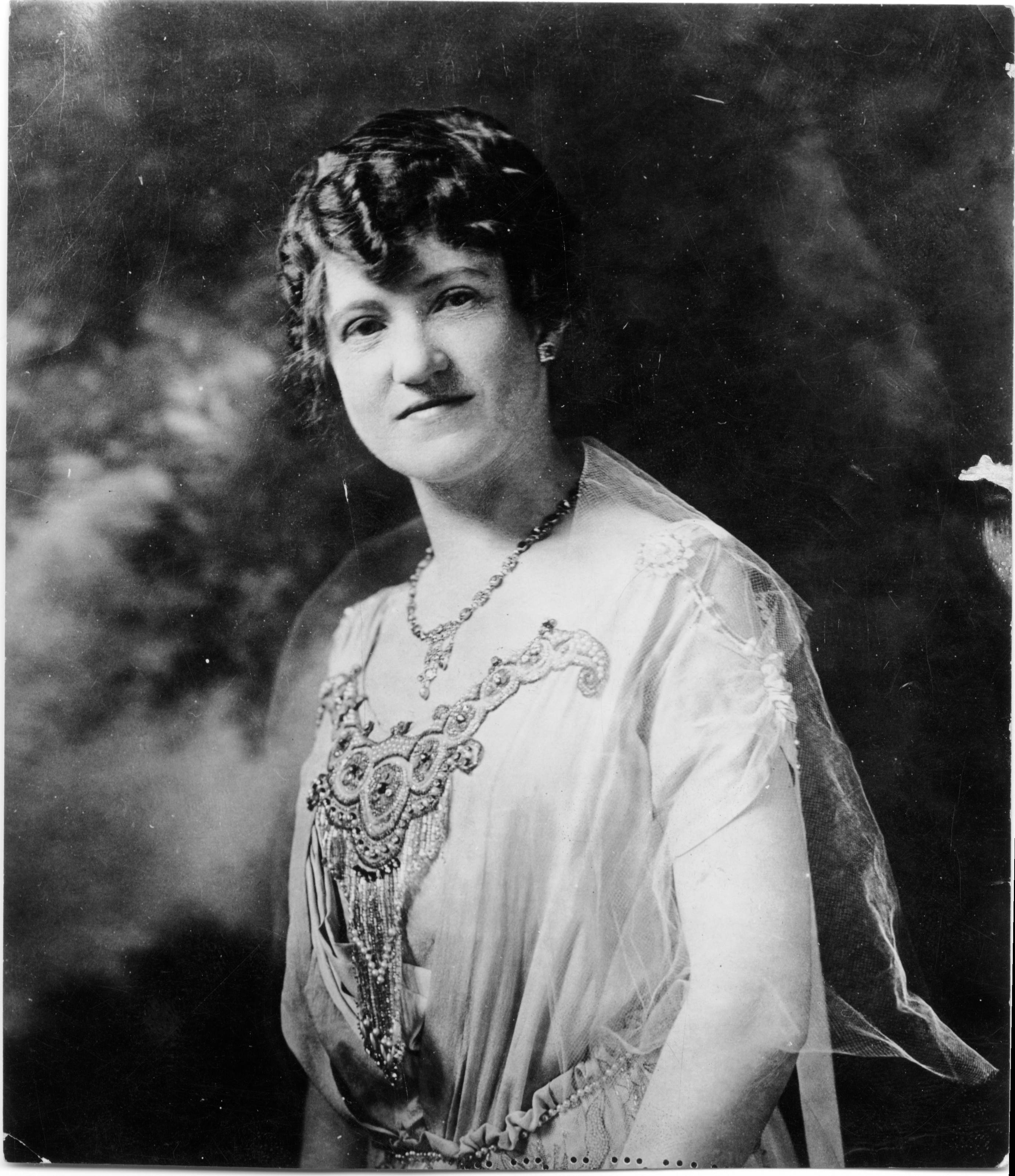
Sue M. Dickey Hough (1926)

Sue Metzger Dickey Hough (November 22, 1883 – December 28, 1980), also known as Sue Metzger Dickey and Sue Metzger Hough, was an American lawyer, businesswoman, and politician. A native of the Commonwealth of Pennsylvania, she became one of the first four female legislators in Minnesota, and was an early advocate of gun control.

== Formative years and family ==
Sue Metzger Dickey was born in Lancaster, Pennsylvania on November 22, 1883. Her grandfather John Dickey and her uncle Oliver James Dickey were involved with politics in Pennsylvania. Her great-grandfather was U.S. President John Quincy Adams.

She moved to Minneapolis, Minnesota with her family when she was two years old and graduated from Central High School in Minneapolis in 1902. She subsequently pursued four years of study at the University of Chicago Law School and wed Frank Hough. The couple made their home in Minneapolis.

== Career ==
Employed as a lawyer, Sue Metzger Dickey Hough engaged in farmland and other real estate transactions, and was also involved with investments.

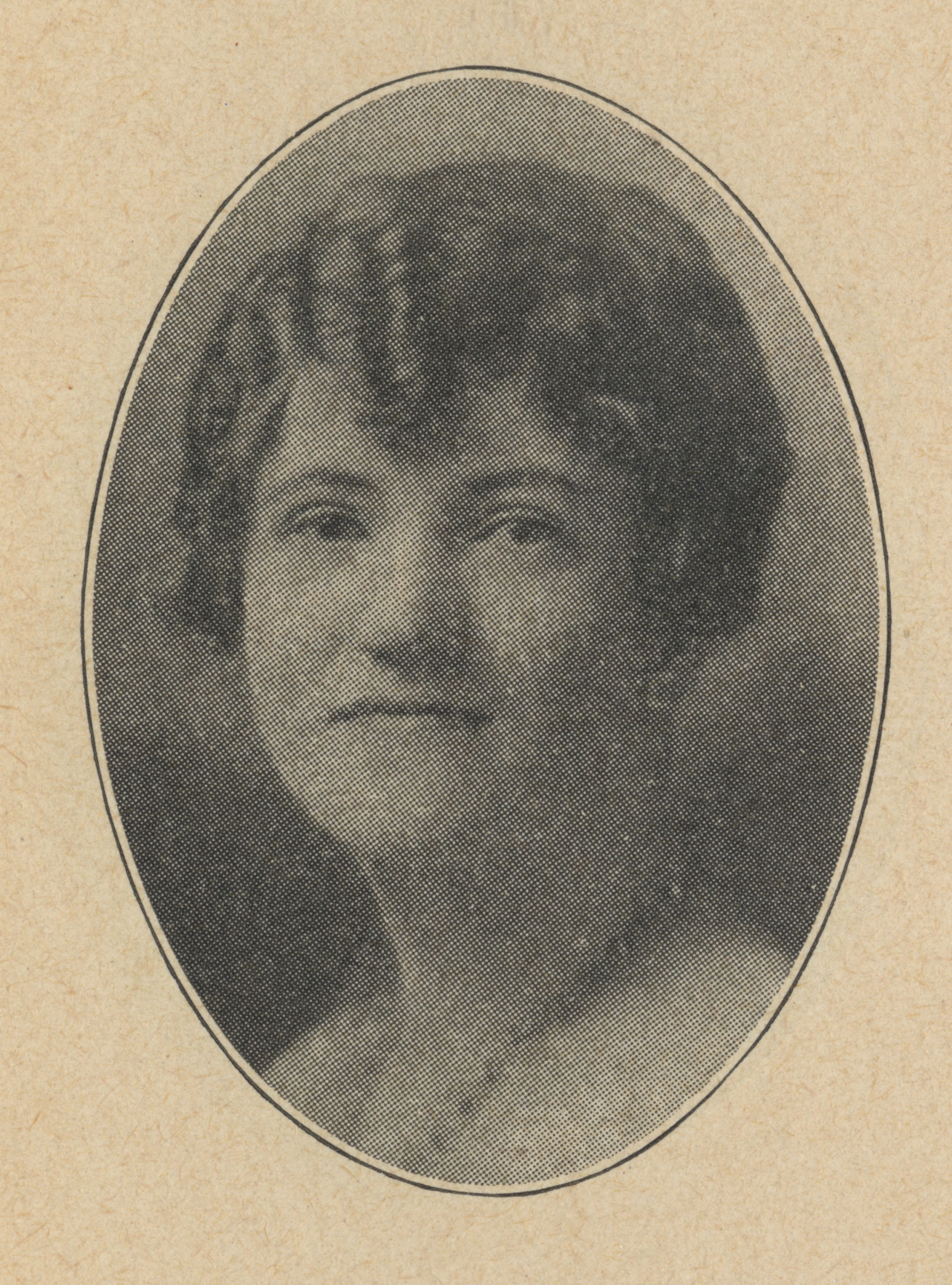
Portrait of Representative Sue Metzger Hough, 1923-1924 Legislative Session, Minnesota Legislature.

A Republican, politically, Hough also served in the Minnesota House of Representatives in 1923 and 1924. After running on a platform of crime and tax reduction, she focused on securing passage of a "revolver bill" that would have required gun buyers to obtain permits in order to purchase and maintain ownership of firearms, and would also have established penalties for noncompliance.

== Death ==
Hough died on December 28, 1980, and was buried in Lancaster, Pennsylvania.
