= Minnesota Constitution =

American state constitution

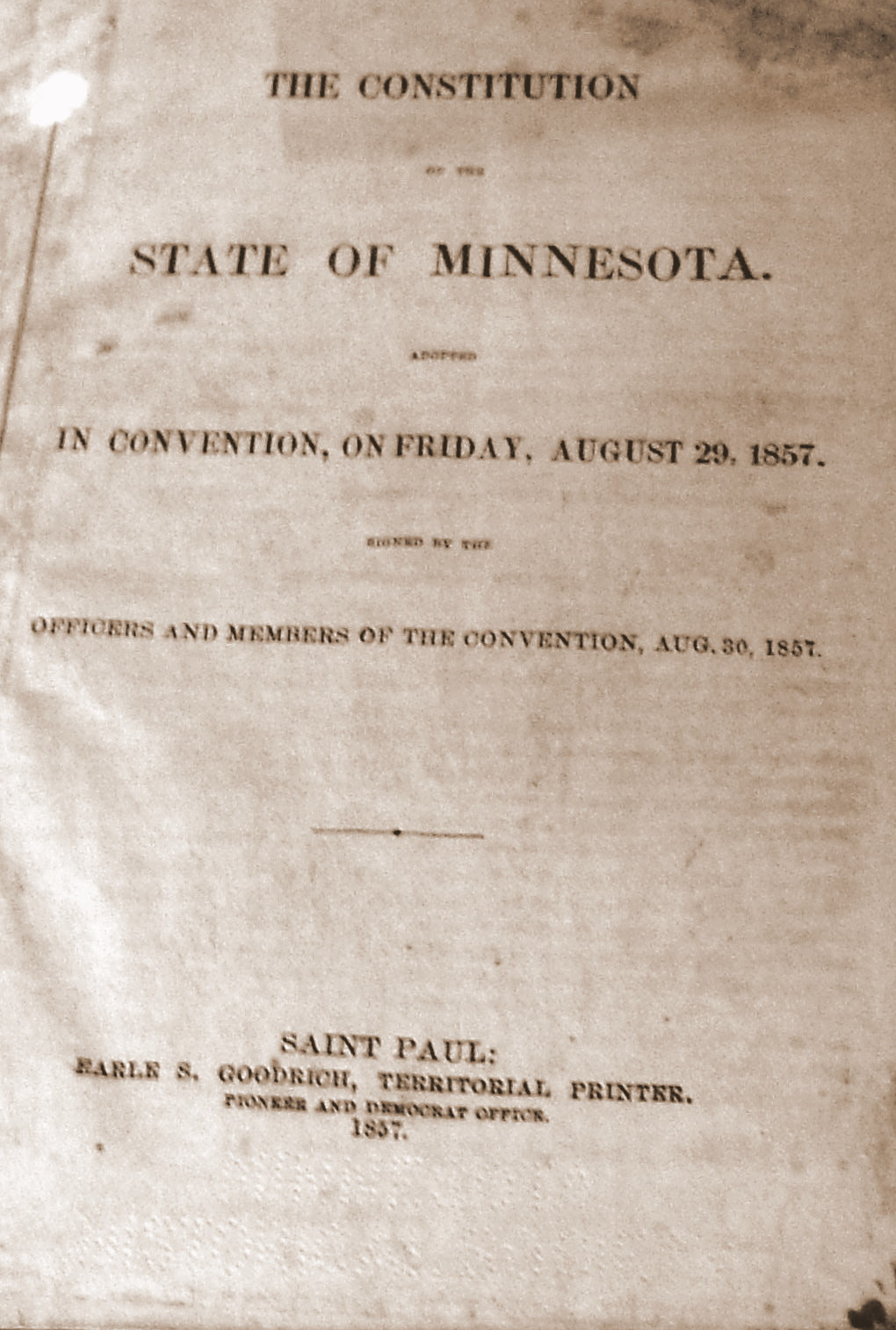
Cover of the first printing of the Minnesota Constitution, 1857

The Constitution of the State of Minnesota was initially approved by the residents of Minnesota Territory in a special election held on October 13, 1857, and was ratified by the United States Senate on May 11, 1858, marking the admittance of Minnesota to the Union. Nearly 120 amendments have been approved (often multiple items at once), with perhaps the most significant being a reorganization in 1974 to simplify the document, making it easier for modern readers to comprehend and reducing the extensive verbiage. It is believed that the constitution was amended twice prior to ratification.

== History ==
=== European Settlement ===
Minnesota's settlement and organization were influenced by three factors: force, as it was conquered by European powers and later the United States; accident, as some European settlers arrived following the fur trade and American civilians drifted into the territory seeking opportunities; and choice, as the American settlers in the territory decided to establish a civil society.

=== The Stillwater Convention ===
In 1838, the region that is now Minnesota was divided between the Iowa and Wisconsin territories. The part of Minnesota west of the Mississippi River within the Iowa Territory remained unoccupied by European Americans. It, therefore, did not require a civil government for the next eight years. When Iowa became a state in 1846, Minnesota became an unorganized territory without issue. The area east of the Mississippi River had several hundred American settlers and was organized as St. Croix County within Wisconsin Territory. However, in 1848, Wisconsin became a state, and St. Croix County was left to its own devices. In response, the settlers in the area held a convention in Stillwater and passed resolutions calling for Congress to establish a new territory named Minnesota. An election was held to choose a new territorial delegate to Congress, and Henry Hastings Sibley was elected. This marked the beginning of Minnesota as a territory. Congress responded to this request by passing the Organic Act of Minnesota, which established the territory and provided for its government. This act remains one of the constitutional documents of the state.

=== The Organic Act ===
The Organic Act served as the constitution for the Minnesota Territory from June 1849 until May 1858, when Minnesota became a state. The boundaries of the Minnesota Territory included the eastern half of the Dakotas to the Missouri River, but this area was subsequently detached when Minnesota became a state. The capital of the Minnesota Territory was St. Paul, which became the permanent state capital after an unsuccessful attempt was made in 1857 to move the capital to St. Peter. The Minnesota Territory was governed by an appointed governor and secretary and had an appointed judicial system. It also had a legislative assembly consisting of a nine-member council and an eighteen-member house of representatives, which the territory's residents elected. The Minnesota Historical Society was also established in the territory in 1849 and is now the oldest state institution in Minnesota.

The Organic Act of Minnesota established the territory and provided for its government, including creating a legislative assembly and a judicial system. Local governments were also established, with the right to appoint or elect officers as determined by the territorial governor and legislative assembly. The act also defined the qualifications for voting, which were restricted to free white males who were citizens or had declared their intention to become citizens. The legislative assembly had the power to pass legislation on any subject consistent with the Constitution of the United States, and both the territorial governor and Congress had the right to veto acts of the assembly. The governor's veto could be overridden by a two-thirds vote of the assembly, while Congress's veto was final. The act also placed a limitation on the legislative assembly's ability to pass laws concerning the disposal of public land. It imposed higher taxes on non-residents' property compared to residents' property. It reserved sections 16 and 36 in every township for the establishment of a universal education system in the future state. Voting was restricted to white male citizens or those who had declared their intention to become citizens. The act granted veto power to both the territorial governor and Congress, with the governor's veto able to be overridden by a two-thirds vote of the assembly. In contrast, Congress's veto could not be overridden.

=== Population Growth ===
The establishment of the territorial government of Minnesota in 1849 greatly encouraged the growth and development of the state. The population increased from around 4,000 non-natives in 1849 to 150,000 in 1857, on the eve of statehood. This growth was facilitated by the territorial government's efforts to extinguish Native American land claims and enable settlers to acquire titles to their lands. About three-quarters of the state was opened to non-Indian settlement between establishing the territorial government and achieving statehood.

=== The Enabling Act ===
The Enabling Act was a piece of legislation passed by Congress in 1857 that enabled the people of Minnesota to form a state by holding an election for a constitutional convention, writing a constitution, approving it through a referendum, and submitting it to Congress for admission to the Union. The Enabling Act also established the basic system of federal land grants to the states for common schools, a state university, public buildings, and salt springs, and provided that 5 percent of the proceeds of the sale of federal public lands in Minnesota be granted to the state for building public roads. It also set Minnesota's final borders and provided for concurrent jurisdiction on the Mississippi and other rivers and waters bordering the state, declaring that they should be "common highways and forever free."

During the constitutional convention held in St. Paul in July 1857, tensions between Democratic and Republican delegates were high and the two groups ended up writing separate versions of the constitution. However, the two documents were almost identical, with minor differences in spelling, grammar, and style. The two versions were then submitted to the voters of the state as required by the Enabling Act and both were approved, resulting in Minnesota having two original constitutions. The state's constitution has served for almost 160 years and has not undergone significant revision, although there have been periodic proposals for a constitutional convention.

=== Creation and Ratification ===
An election in Minnesota Territory to select Republican and Democratic delegates to a state constitutional convention was held on June 1, 1857, following passage of an enabling act by the U.S. Congress on February 26 of that year ("The Enabling Act for a State of Minnesota"). The Republican version, as drafted by William Winthrop, a Yale Law graduate, abolitionist, future Civil War officer, and leading scholar of military law, called for universal male suffrage. The convention was held in Saint Paul from July 13 to August 29. However, the divisions between the two political parties were so great that they each held their own separate conventions and never met together aside from five people from each party who met in a conference committee to create a document acceptable to both sides. Still, the tension was so extreme that delegates would not sign anything that had previously been signed by a member of the complementary convention.

In the end, each convention signed their own copies of the document. The two were essentially identical, but had about 300 differences in punctuation, grammar, and wording because of errors in transcription produced as copyists worked late into the night on August 28. The Republican version, written on white paper, ran 39 pages and was signed by 53 delegates, while the Democratic version, written on blue-tinged paper, was 37 pages long and had 51 signatures.

On October 13, an election to approve the constitution was held. Ballots only provided for an affirmative answer, which probably reduced the number of negative votes since doing so required altering the ballot. The tally was 30,055 for acceptance and 571 for rejection.

Territorial secretary Charles L. Chase, a Democrat, sent a certified copy of the Democratic version to Washington, D.C. to be ratified by the Senate. A copy of the Republican version was also sent by an unknown party, and there is good historical evidence to show that both versions were available to Congress members. Additionally, the Republican version was sent with the bill returned to Minnesota.

The Minnesota State Legislature began to convene before the constitution was ratified, although officials elected to other positions such as governor did not begin acting in their official roles until later. The first two acts created by the legislature were amendments to the constitution, and they were approved by voters on April 15, 1858. One authorized a loan to railroads of US$5 million, and the other related to the term of office of the first state officers. Amended constitutions were apparently the ones viewed by Congress during the ratification process. The validity of the early laws passed by the Legislature is somewhat in doubt, although they have never been challenged in court.

=== 1974 Alteration ===
In 1971, the legislature created a commission to study the constitution and make recommendations to maintain its utility. After reviewing the document for two years, it was recommended that the constitution be amended to rewrite it in modern language and allow easier reference. The amendment was approved by voters on November 5, 1974. This did not alter the meaning of the constitution, although if there is a case where meaning is ambiguous, the original document remains the final authority.

The earlier wording of the constitution, including all of the amendments approved since adoption in 1857, is printed in the Minnesota Legislative Manual 1973–74, pages 445–484.

== Bill of rights ==
A bill of rights is featured prominently in the constitution as Article I. There are seventeen sections, including many that echo the amendments to the United States Constitution by subject, but not necessarily by language. The Minnesota Supreme Court, which has final authority over how the Bill of Rights is interpreted, has given conflicting signals about when the state Bill of Rights should be interpreted differently from the federal one.

For example, Section 3 states that "the liberty of the press shall forever remain inviolate, and all persons may freely speak, write and publish their sentiments on all subjects, being responsible for the abuse of such right." The First Amendment to the United States Constitution, by contrast, states that "Congress shall make no law ... abridging the freedom of speech, or of the press." Despite the affirmative protections of Section 3, the Minnesota Supreme Court has followed the majority position of most states, rejected the position of the Supreme Court of California in the landmark case of Robins v. Pruneyard Shopping Center, and stubbornly refused to interpret such language any differently from the First Amendment. The court's most recent case on this issue was State v. Wicklund, in 1999, which involved a failed attempt by fur-coat protesters to demonstrate at the privately owned but publicly financed Mall of America.

By contrast, Section 16 addresses the "freedom of conscience," or more generally freedom of religion. In the 1990 case of State v. Hershberger, which involved the Amish's successful attempt to be declared exempt from a state traffic law, the Minnesota Supreme Court affirmed more expansive protections for Minnesotans than the First Amendment's Free Exercise Clause provides.

Although the text of Section 10 is exactly the same as the Fourth Amendment to the United States Constitution, the Minnesota Supreme Court has frequently interpreted it differently, so as to provide more expansive protections for persons subject to criminal prosecution under state law. For example, in the 2003 case of State v. Carter, the court held that a police dog's "sniff" of a rented storage locker is a "search" under the state Bill of Rights even though it is not a search under the federal Bill of Rights. In the 1994 case of Ascher v. Commissioner of Public Safety, the court held that DWI sobriety checkpoints, while constitutional under the Fourth Amendment, were unconstitutional under Article 1, Section 10.

Some of the other provisions in the Minnesota Bill of Rights are for trial by jury and due process of law.

== The Legislature ==
Amongst other rules, the state legislature may not meet in regular session "after the first Monday following the third Saturday in May of any year." The governor may call a special session following that date to handle unresolved issues from the regular session or to deal with unforeseen events such as emergency funding following natural disasters.

Minnesota's fiscal year runs from July 1 to June 30, so if a biennial budget isn't passed by the end of June in an odd-numbered year, the effect is a government shutdown, as happened in 2005 and again in 2011.

Similar to the Tennessee State Constitution, bills brought before the legislature may deal with only one subject.

== Transportation ==
Article XIV of the constitution is dedicated to discussing the public highway system of the state and the methods of funding. It authorizes a trunk highway system overseen by the state and methods of funding roadways overseen by smaller political divisions within Minnesota. Sections 4 and 5 in Article X also describe the taxation of fuel and vehicles used in relation to airborne transportation, including aircraft and supplemental vehicles.

In 1920, the Babcock Amendment authorized 70 "constitutional route" (CR) highways cris-crossing the state. Until the 1974 modification of the constitution (see section below), these were enumerated in the document itself, though today they are listed in the Minnesota Statutes (§161.114). Still, the general routes cannot be altered or removed without amending the constitution and are therefore somewhat fixed. In many cases, the constitutional route numbers do not match highway numbers. In fact, it has been common for CR highways to be composed of several different trunk highways. When the U.S. Highway system was created in 1926, many of these roads were made up of one or more U.S. highways. Today, they now use a mix of Minnesota state highways, U.S. highways, and Interstate highways.

There is some ambiguity in how literally the Minnesota Department of Transportation must interpret the constitutional routes. In some cases, the routes no longer directly serve communities they were once designated for, but are routed along nearby interstates instead.

The strong support given to automobile and aircraft transportation is often criticized by advocates of public transportation (buses, light rail, etc.), which they believe is inappropriately funded. While highways have a consistent source of money, Metro Transit has had to frequently petition the legislature for funding.

== Style ==
Minnesota's constitution is characterized by a combination of the commonwealth pattern, which emphasizes the philosophical nature of the constitution, and the frame-of-government pattern, which focuses on the structure of state government and the distribution of powers within the state. This is typical of western states in the United States. The Minnesota Constitution is relatively short, ranking among the shorter constitutions in the country. Still, it includes explicit provisions for the powers and duties of state officers, schools, taxes, banking, highways, and legislative apportionment, as well as extensive sections on natural resource conservation and progressive social policy
