= List of LGBTQ leaders of national and sub-national legislatures =

This list presents LGBTQ speakers of national and sub-national legislative chambers of their respective countries or territories.

== National ==
Name (lifespan)	Image	Country	Legislative body	Mandate start	Mandate end	Term length	Notes
Herman Tjeenk Willink (born 1942)		Netherlands	Senate	11 June 1991	11 March 1997	5 years, 273 days	
Claude Janiak (born 1948)		Switzerland	National Council	28 November 2005	3 December 2006	1 year, 5 days	
Vera Bergkamp (born 1971)		Netherlands	House of Representatives	7 April 2021	5 December 2023	2 years, 242 days	
Thom van Campen (born 1990)		Netherlands	House of Representatives	18 November 2025	present	314 days	
Amir Ohana (born 1976)		Israel	Knesset	29 December 2022	present	3 years, 273 days	
Ana Brnabić (born 1975)		Serbia	National Assembly	20 March 2024	present	2 years, 192 days	

== Subnational ==
Name (lifespan)	Image	Country	State	Office Held (tenure)	Notes
Toni Atkins (born 1962)		United States	California	California State Assembly (2010–2016) Speaker of the Assembly (2014–2016) California State Senate (2016–present) President pro tempore of the Senate (2018–2024)	First lesbian to serve as California Assembly Speaker and first LGBTQ person/woman serve as President Pro Tempore of the California Senate
Becca Balint (born 1968)		United States	Vermont	Vermont Senate (2015–2023) Senate Majority Leader (2017–2021) President pro tempore of the Vermont Senate (2021–2023)	First lesbian to serve in Vermont Senate and first woman and LGBTQ person to serve as president pro tempore in Vermont.
Lynne Brown (born 1961)		South Africa	Western Cape	Speaker of the Western Cape Provincial Parliament (2001–2004)	
Tim Carpenter (born 1960)		United States	Wisconsin	Wisconsin Senate (1985–2003) Wisconsin State Assembly (1985–2003) Wisconsin Senate (2003–present) President pro tempore of the Senate (2012–2013)	
Cecil Clarke (born 1968)		Canada	Nova Scotia	Speaker of the Nova Scotia House of Assembly (2006–2007)	Came out after leaving office
Ryan Fecteau (born 1992)		United States	Maine	Member of Maine House of Representatives (2014–2022; 2024–present) Speaker of the Maine House of Representatives (2020–2022; 2024–present)	First openly gay Speaker of the Maine House of Representatives
Mark Ferrandino (born 1977)		United States	Colorado	Colorado House of Representatives (2007–2015) Minority Leader (2011–2013) Speaker of the House (2013–2015)	First openly gay House Speaker and House Minority Leader of the Colorado General Assembly
Gordon Fox (born 1961)		United States	Rhode Island	Rhode Island House of Representatives (1993–2015) Majority Leader (2003–2010) Speaker of the House (2010–2014)	First openly LGBTQ Speaker of the House
Laurie Jinkins (born 1964)		United States	Washington	Speaker of the Washington House of Representatives (2020–present)	First openly LGBTQ Speaker of the House.
Tina Kotek (born 1966)		United States	Oregon	Oregon House of Representatives (2007–2022) Speaker pro tempore (2011) Majority Leader (2011–2013) Speaker of the Oregon House of Representatives (2013–2022)	First openly lesbian state House speaker in U.S.
John Pérez (born 1969)		United States	California	California State Assembly (2008–2014) Speaker of the Assembly (2010–2014)	First openly LGBTQ Speaker of the California Assembly
Chansey Paech (born 1987)		Australia	Northern Territory	Speaker of the Northern Territory Legislative Assembly (2020)	
Stan Rosenberg (born 1949)		United States	Massachusetts	Massachusetts House of Representatives (1987–1991) Massachusetts Senate (1991–2018) President of the Massachusetts Senate (2015–2017)	First out Senate Majority Leader in Massachusetts
Allan Spear (1937–2008)		United States	Minnesota	Minnesota Senate (1973–2001) President of the Minnesota Senate (1993–2001)	First openly LGBTQ person to serve on a state legislature (came out in 1974) and first out presiding officer for a state legislature
Pat Spearman (born 1955)		United States	Nevada	Nevada Senate (2012–present) President pro tempore (2023–present)	First out lesbian in the Nevada Legislature
Freya Van den Bossche (born 1975)		Belgium	Flemish Community	Speaker of the Flemish Parliament (2025–present)	
