= Steve Murphy (politician) =

American politician

Member of the Minnesota Senate from the 29th and 28th district
- In office January 5, 1993 – January 3, 2011
- Preceded by: Lyle Mehrkens
- Succeeded by: John Sterling Howe

Personal details
- Born: September 9, 1957 (age 69) San Francisco, California, U.S.
- Party: Democratic (DFL)
- Children: 2
- Education: Red Wing Technical College; Eastern Illinois University

Steve Murphy (born September 9, 1957) is a Minnesota politician and a former member of the Minnesota Senate who represented District 28, which includes portions of Goodhue, Wabasha and Winona counties in the southeastern part of the state. A Democrat, he was first elected in 1992, representing the old District 29 until redistricting in 2002. He was re-elected in 1996, 2000, 2002 and 2006. On January 22, 2010, he announced that he would not seek a sixth term.

Murphy was chair of the Senate Transportation Committee. He was a member of the Senate's Agriculture and Veterans Committee, Business, Industry and Jobs Committee, Capital Investment Committee, and Finance Committee. He also served on the Finance subcommittees for the Agriculture and Veterans Budget and Policy Division, for the Transportation Budget and Policy Division (which he also chaired), and for the Transportation Budget and Policy Division-Transit Subdivision, and on the Transportation Subcommittee for Airways, Waterways and Railways. He was also appointed to several Workforce Development councils by Senate leadership and the governor.

Murphy attended Red Wing Technical College and Eastern Illinois University. He is a four-year veteran of the United States Marine Corps. Prior to being elected senator, he worked as an operator with Northern States Power (now Xcel Energy), and has spent over 25 years with the company. He also worked at the Prairie Island Nuclear Power Plant for six years, and at the Red Wing Steam Plant for 19 years. He has been married twice and has two children.
