= Metzen =

Metzen is a surname. Notable people with the surname include:

- Jim Metzen (1943–2016), American politician and businessman
- Chris Metzen (born 1973), American artist, author, and game designer
