= Keith Ellison =

American politician (born 1963)

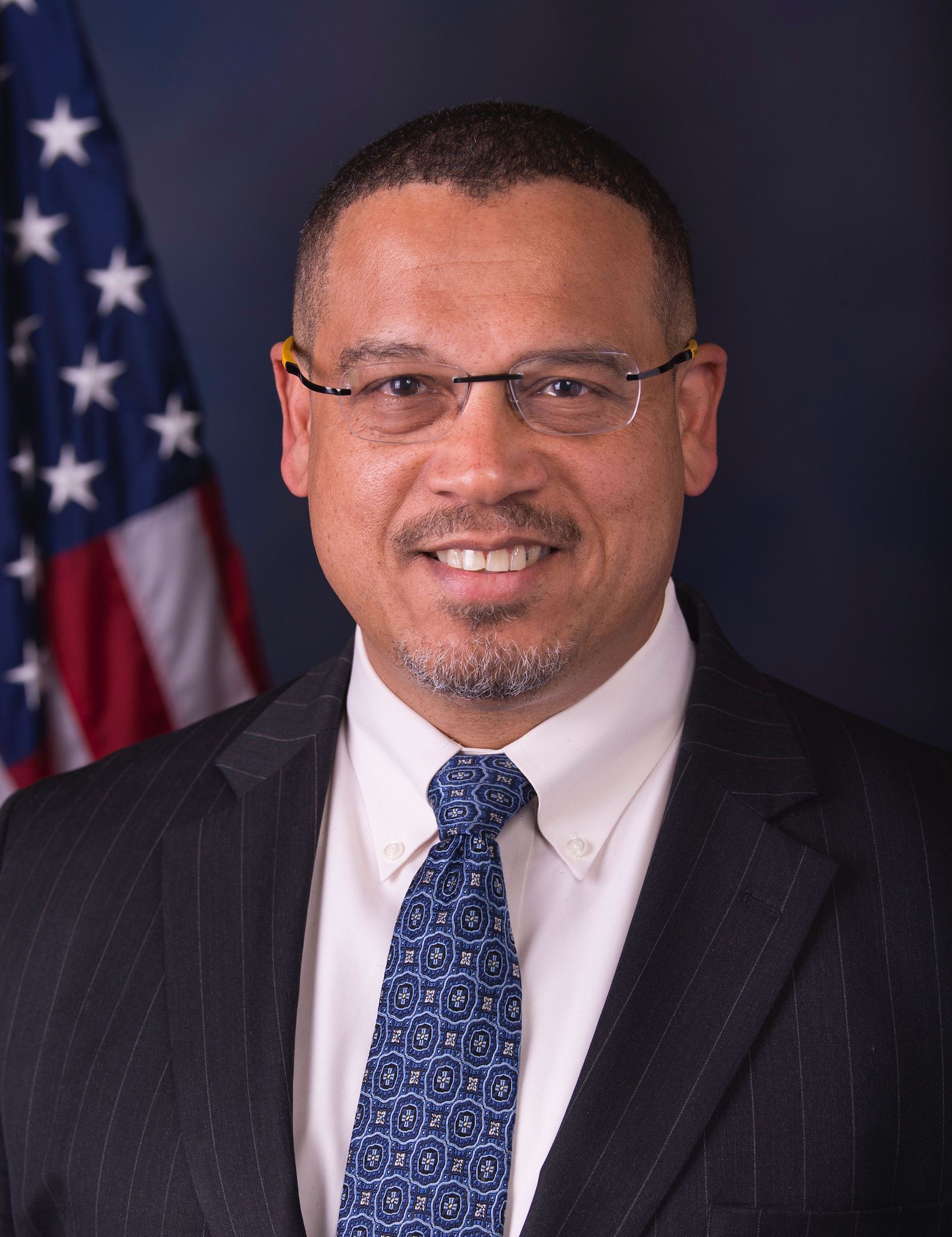
- Official portrait, 2018

30th Attorney General of Minnesota
- Incumbent
- Assumed office January 7, 2019
- Governor: Tim Walz
- Preceded by: Lori Swanson

Deputy Chair of the Democratic National Committee
- In office February 25, 2017 – November 8, 2018
- Chair: Tom Perez
- Preceded by: Mike Honda (2005)
- Succeeded by: Position abolished

Chair of the Congressional Progressive Caucus
- In office January 3, 2011 – May 23, 2017 Serving with Raúl Grijalva
- Preceded by: Lynn Woolsey
- Succeeded by: Mark Pocan

Member of the U.S. House of Representatives from Minnesota's 5th district
- In office January 3, 2007 – January 3, 2019
- Preceded by: Martin Olav Sabo
- Succeeded by: Ilhan Omar

Member of the Minnesota House of Representatives from the 58B district
- In office January 7, 2003 – January 3, 2007
- Preceded by: Gregory Gray
- Succeeded by: Augustine Dominguez

Personal details
- Born: Keith Maurice Ellison; August 4, 1963 (age 63) Detroit, Michigan, U.S.
- Party: Democratic
- Spouse(s): Kim Ellison (m. 1987; div. 2012) Mónica Hurtado (m. 2018)
- Children: 4, including Jeremiah
- Education: Wayne State University (BA); University of Minnesota (JD)
- Website: Campaign website
- Ellison's voice Ellison supporting the Money Remittances Improvement Act of 2014. Recorded May 6, 2014

Keith Maurice Ellison (born August 4, 1963) is an American politician and lawyer serving as the 30th attorney general of Minnesota since 2019. From 2007 to 2019, Ellison was the U.S. representative for Minnesota's 5th congressional district, representing the Minneapolis region. He also served as Deputy Chair of the Democratic National Committee from 2017 to 2018 and was a member of the Minnesota House of Representatives from 2003 to 2007. He is a member of the Democratic–Farmer–Labor Party (DFL).

A progressive, Ellison served as co-chair of the Congressional Progressive Caucus and a chief deputy whip during his congressional tenure. Ellison was the first Muslim elected to Congress and the first African American representative from Minnesota. He garnered national attention in his campaign in the 2017 Democratic National Committee chairmanship election, gaining support from progressive groups and U.S. senators Bernie Sanders and Chuck Schumer. His candidacy prompted renewed scrutiny of his past statements and affiliation with the Nation of Islam, which drew criticism from some moderate Democrats. Ellison lost to Tom Perez, who subsequently appointed Ellison deputy chair.

Ellison was elected attorney general of Minnesota in 2018. He is the first African American elected to partisan statewide office in Minnesota and the first Muslim in the U.S. to win statewide office. He was reelected in 2022 with 50.4% of the vote and in 2026 with 54.3% of the vote.

== Early life, education, and career ==
Keith Maurice Ellison, the third of five sons, was raised Catholic in Detroit, Michigan, by his parents, Leonard Ellison, a psychiatrist and Clida Ellison (née Martinez), a social worker. Ellison and three of his brothers became lawyers; his other brother became a doctor. One of Ellison's brothers is also the pastor of "Church of the New Covenant Baptist" in Detroit. Ellison's youth was influenced by the involvement of his family in the civil rights movement, including his grandfather's work as a member of the NAACP in Louisiana.

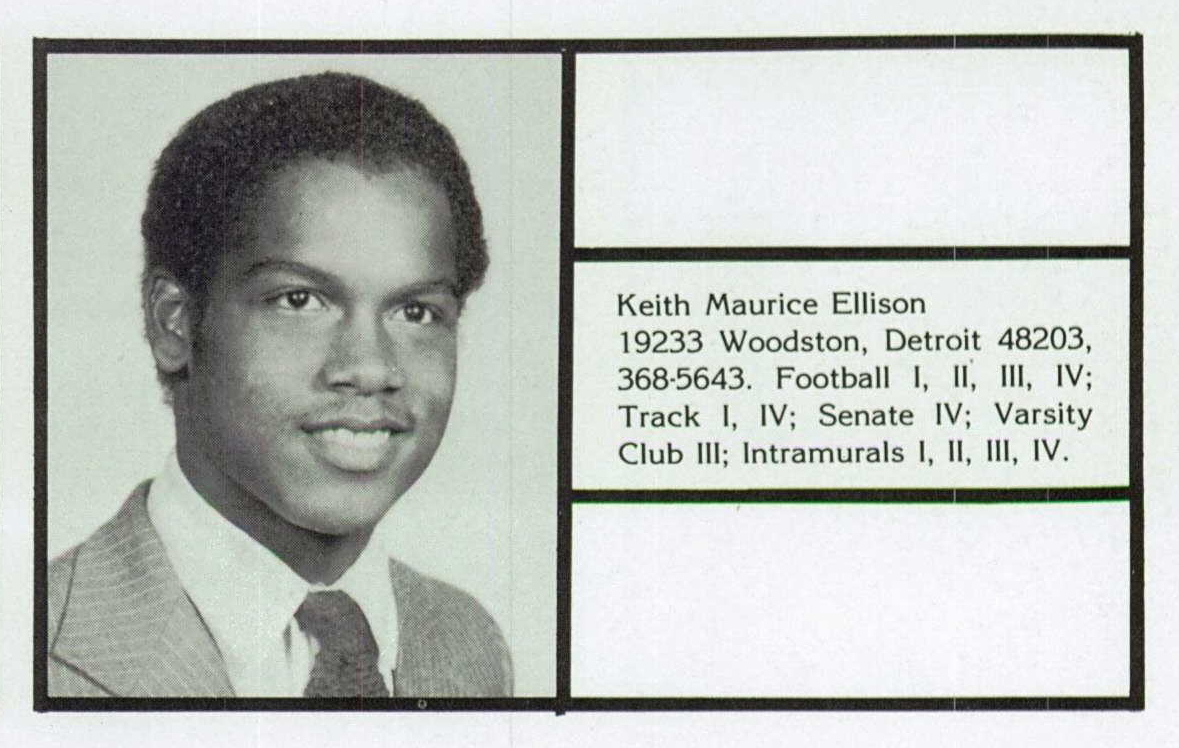
Ellison in the University of Detroit Jesuit High School and Academy yearbook, 1981

Ellison graduated in 1981 from the University of Detroit Jesuit High School and Academy, where he was active in sports and a senator in the student government. At age 19, while attending Wayne State University, Ellison converted from Catholicism to Islam, later explaining: "I can't claim that I was the most observant Catholic at the time. I had begun to really look around and ask myself about the social circumstances of the country, issues of justice, issues of change. When I looked at my spiritual life, and I looked at what might inform social change, justice in society ... I found Islam." After graduating with a Bachelor of Arts in economics in 1986, Ellison married his high-school sweetheart and moved to Minneapolis to attend the University of Minnesota Law School. He graduated with a Juris Doctor in 1990.

After graduating from law school, Ellison worked for three years at the firm of Lindquist & Vennum, where he was a litigator specializing in civil rights, employment, and criminal defense law. He then became executive director of Minneapolis's nonprofit Legal Rights Center, which specializes in defending indigent clients. Upon leaving the Legal Rights Center, Ellison entered private practice with the law firm Hassan & Reed Ltd, specializing in trial practice. He was also regularly involved in community service. He served as the unpaid host of a public affairs talk program at KMOJ radio, and also often volunteered as a track coach for several organizations, working with youth between the ages of five and 18. He said, "It's a great community-building device because it's for all ages and all genders. Everyone can find a way to fit in."

== Minnesota House of Representatives ==
In November 2002, Ellison was elected to his first public office, as a member of the Minnesota House of Representatives serving House district 58B. At the time he took his seat, his party was the smallest House minority in Minnesota history. During this session Ellison was appointed to the Governmental Operations & Veterans Affairs Policy Committee, the Judiciary Policy & Finance Committee and the Local Government & Metropolitan Affairs Committee. He also spearheaded an ethics complaint against Rep. Arlon Lindner for a speech Lindner made that Ellison alleged amounted to a denial that homosexuals were persecuted during the Holocaust.

Ellison was reelected to his seat in 2004 with 84% of the vote. During the 84th session, he served on the Civil Law & Elections Committee and the Public Safety Policy & Finance Committee. Upon his election to Congress, Ellison's seat in the Minnesota House of Representatives was filled by Augustine Dominguez, a Latino community activist and fellow member of the DFL.

== U.S. House of Representatives ==
=== Elections ===
Ellison's House seat was previously held by Martin Olav Sabo, whose announcement of his intention to retire precipitated Ellison's candidacy. At the DFL Convention on May 6, 2006, Ellison won the party endorsement over nine other candidates, leading 2-to-1 on the first ballot, and winning endorsement on the fourth ballot. In the primary, Ellison faced former state senator Ember Reichgott Junge, Minneapolis city council member Paul Ostrow, and Sabo's chief of staff Mike Erlandson, whom Sabo had endorsed. Ellison won the primary on September 12, 2006, with 41% of the vote. One issue Ellison's campaign opponents raised was the repeated suspension of his driver's license for failure to pay tickets and fines. Ellison had also failed to pay all or part of his income taxes in five separate years between 1992 and 2000, forcing the state and Internal Revenue Service to put liens on his home. He later paid in excess of $18,000. In the November 2006 election, Ellison faced Republican Alan Fine, the Green Party's Jay Pond, and Tammy Lee of the Independence Party. Ellison won the seat with 56% of the vote.

==== Campaign finance disclosures ====
In early 2006, the Minnesota State Campaign Finance and Public Disclosure Board reprimanded Ellison for events alleged in 2002–04, namely

- unreported campaign contributions
- discrepancies in cash balances, and
- misclassified disbursements, during his campaigns for the Minnesota House of Representatives.

In 2005, the board opened an investigation, and Ellison was subpoenaed and fined. Ellison was repeatedly fined for late filings, was sued twice by the Attorney General of Minnesota, and was warned about absent or incomplete disclosures.

=== Tenure ===
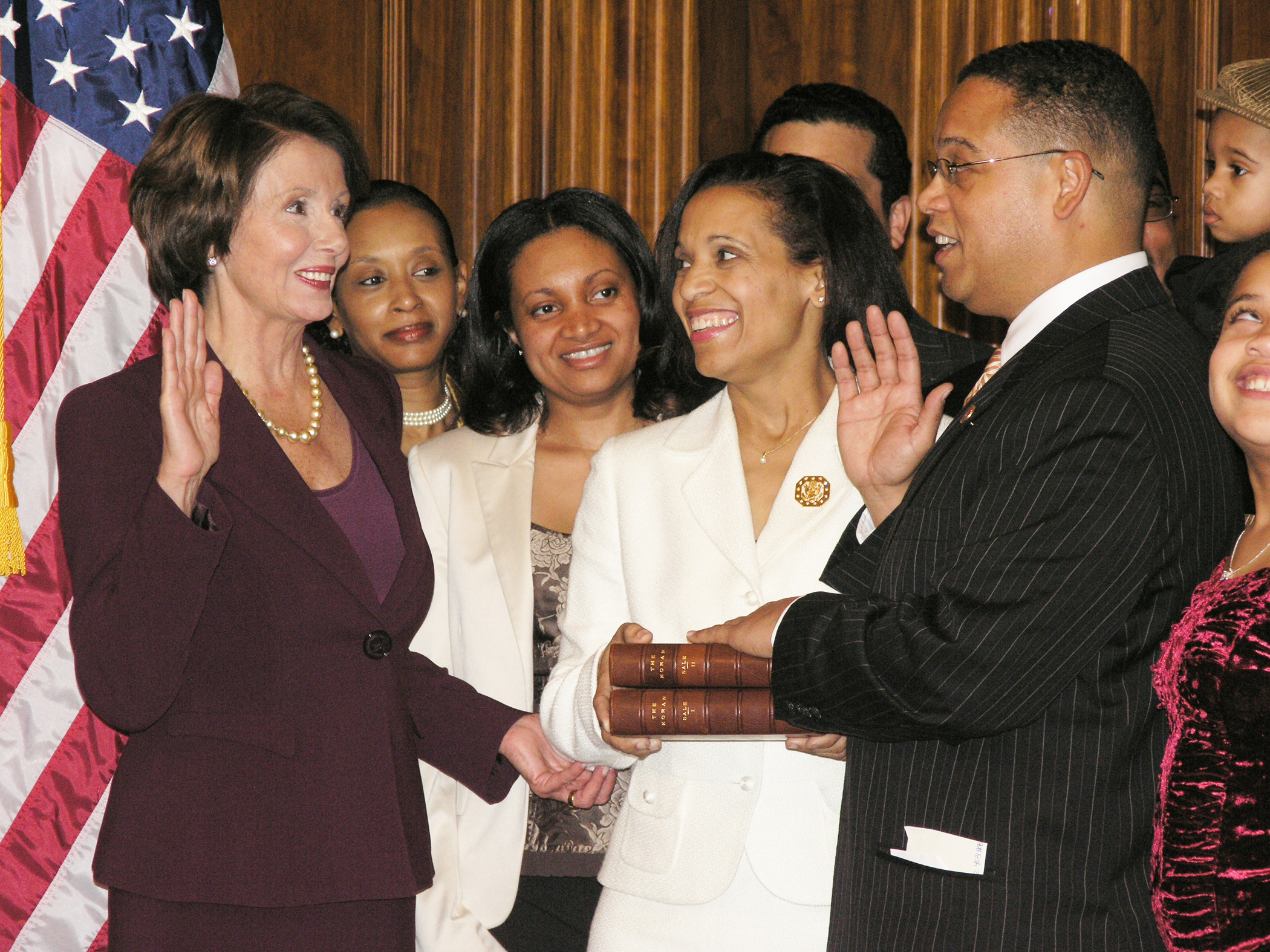
In 2006, Ellison became the first Muslim to be elected to Congress. He was sworn in on Thomas Jefferson's Quran by Nancy Pelosi.

Ellison was elected to the House of Representatives on November 7, 2006, and sworn in on January 4, 2007. He received national attention for his decision to use an English translation of the Qur'an, translated by British scholar George Sale in 1734, that once belonged to President Thomas Jefferson for his reenacted swearing-in ceremony, which generated both praise and criticism from political pundits.

At the time of his swearing in, Ellison said he intended to focus on wages, housing, "relief and justice for the middle class", and ending the U.S. involvement in the Iraq War. Ellison was also a vocal critic of the George W. Bush administration, and sought a position on the House Judiciary Committee for oversight. In his first week as a member of Congress Ellison voted with the new Democratic majority as part of the 100-Hour Plan to raise the minimum wage, for federal funding of stem cell research, and to allow Medicare to negotiate pharmaceutical prices.

On April 3, 2014, Ellison introduced the Money Remittances Improvement Act of 2014 (H.R. 4386; 113th Congress) into the United States House. The bill would make it easier for nonbank financial institutions such as money service businesses to provide remittance payments internationally. Ellison said that "passage of the Money Remittances Improvement Act is cause for celebration for all diaspora communities, including the Somali and Hmong communities I am proud to represent in Minnesota."

==== Credit reform ====
On May 3, 2007, Ellison introduced a bill to outlaw universal default, the practice whereby credit card companies raise interest rates on customers who are behind on payments to other creditors. The bill was supported by House Financial Services Committee chairman Barney Frank. Ellison, who described the bill as "the beginning of a whole credit reform effort we're going to be pursuing," also announced his interest in limiting high interest rates on credit cards and easing the process for those who have a legitimate need to file bankruptcy. This provision ultimately became law in 2009 as part of the "Credit Cardholders' Bill of Rights" portion of the Credit CARD Act of 2009.

=== Committee assignments ===
- Committee on Financial Services (since January 12, 2007)
  - Subcommittee on Capital Markets and Government-Sponsored Enterprises
  - Subcommittee on Oversight and Investigations
    - Terms on Committee (and "Thomas" links at the Library of Congress): 113th Congress (H.Res. 7 – Dem's), 112th (H.Res. 39 – Dem's), 111th (H.Res. 24) and 110th (H.Res. 56).
- Committee on Foreign Affairs
  - 111th Congress, 2009–2010 (H.Res. 74)
- Judiciary Committee
  - 110th Congress, 2007–2008 (H.Res. 75)

=== Caucus memberships ===
- Congressional Progressive Caucus (Vice-chair)
- Congressional Lesbian Gay Bisexual Transgender Caucus (Vice-chair)
- Congressional Black Caucus
- Congressional Arts Caucus
- Congressional Asian Pacific American Caucus

== Candidacy for Chair of Democratic National Committee ==
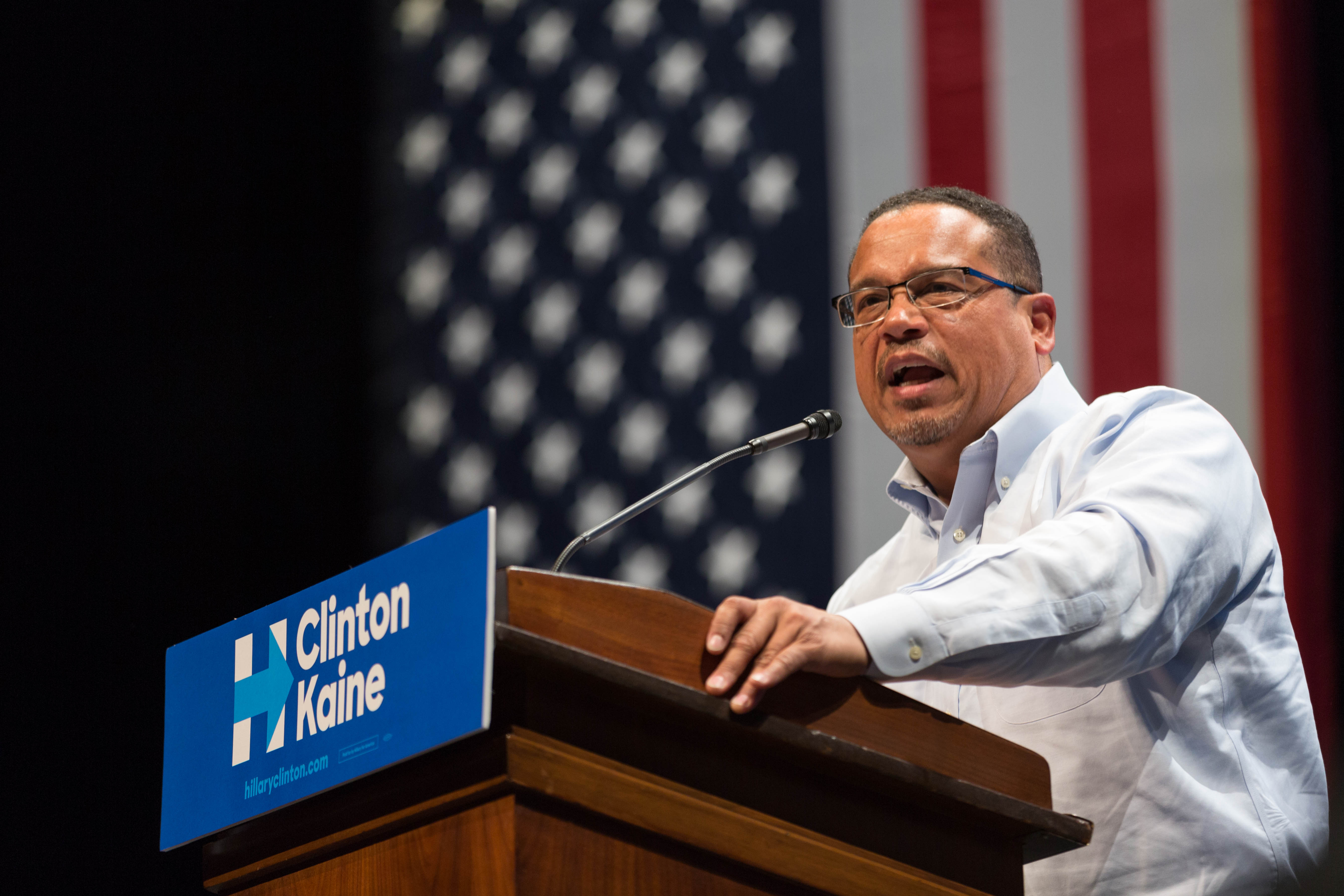
Ellison sought the chairmanship of the Democratic National Committee in 2017. The post ultimately went to Tom Perez, and Ellison assumed the newly created position of deputy chair.

In 2017, after acting chair Donna Brazile resigned, Ellison ran for the chairmanship of the Democratic National Committee, along with Howard Dean, Martin O'Malley, Raymond Buckley, and Jaime R. Harrison, chairman of the South Carolina Democratic Party. Ellison, who at the time served as chair of the Congressional Progressive Caucus, emerged as a top contender and was viewed as a progressive alternative to the more moderate wings of the party. The race was viewed by some commentators and analysts as a proxy battle between the Clinton and Sanders factions of the party.

=== Support ===
In autumn 2016, Ellison was endorsed by both Senator Bernie Sanders and incoming Senate Minority Leader Chuck Schumer. In November 2016, outgoing Senate Minority Leader Harry Reid endorsed Ellison for DNC chair. In early December Ellison's endorsements included the AFL–CIO and several elected officials in Congress, including senators Elizabeth Warren and Martin Heinrich, and Representatives John Lewis, Luis Gutiérrez and Tulsi Gabbard, among others.

=== Opposition ===
Obama loyalists were uneasy with Ellison, and began looking for a candidate to oppose him, holding meetings with Obama administration labor secretary Thomas Perez. In November 2016, the Investigative Project on Terrorism published a 2010 speech in which Ellison asked why the United States foreign policy in the Middle East "is governed by what is good or bad through a country of 7 million people. A region of 350 million all turns on a country of 7 million. Does that make sense? Is that logic?" His comments were interpreted as a reference to Israel. The Anti-Defamation League (ADL) effectively announced its opposition to Ellison's candidacy, issuing a press release saying that his statement "raises serious concerns about whether Ellison faithfully could represent the Democratic Party's traditional support for a strong and secure Israel." CNN also reported on his past support for antisemitic and radical organizations and individuals, particularly the Nation of Islam and Louis Farrakhan, but said they had found no antisemitic writings or public statements by Ellison, and cited his public rejection of the group "due to its propagation of bigoted and antisemitic ideas and statements". The New York Times reported that one of the Democratic Party's biggest donors, Haim Saban, said in his 2016 foreign policy forum that Ellison is "clearly an antisemitic and anti-Israel person." Reporters from The Washington Post, Slate, and The Huffington Post have described this as part of a smear campaign against Ellison, and observed that Ellison's rivals agreed that Saban should apologize for the comments. Schumer replied to critics, saying that Ellison has supported pro-Israeli policies within the Democratic Party, telling The Atlantic that "while I disagree with some of [Ellison's] past positions, I saw him orchestrate one of the most pro-Israel platforms in decades by successfully persuading other skeptical committee members to adopt such a strong platform."

Opposition arose from Democrats concerned that Ellison, a sitting congressman, would not be able to devote himself to the position full-time. In response, Ellison pledged that he would resign from Congress if he won the election. Others opposed him on ideological grounds, characterized by National Public Radio (NPR) as representing the party's division in the 2016 Democratic presidential primary between centrist supporters of Hillary Clinton and the party's left wing, which backed Bernie Sanders. FiveThirtyEight argued that Perez and Ellison have "essentially identical" ideologies.

=== Results and creation of deputy chair position ===
By February 2017, Perez was perceived as the front-runner according to The New York Times. A member of The Young Turks spotted Ellison and Perez dining together a week before the election was held. Upon being elected chair, Perez quickly motioned for Ellison to be elected "deputy chair", saying, "it is a motion that I have discussed with a good friend, and his name is Keith Ellison." The two newly elected chairs worked together when Perez was labor secretary, and he has regarded Ellison as one of his "best allies". The position of "deputy chair" does not exist in the DNC's bylaws. On November 8, 2018, Ellison resigned as deputy chair to focus on his upcoming tenure as Attorney General of Minnesota.

== Minnesota Attorney General ==
=== Election ===
On June 5, 2018, Ellison announced that he would not seek reelection to a seventh term in Congress in 2018, but would instead run for Minnesota Attorney General. On August 14, Ellison won the Democratic primary with 49.8% of the vote, a little more than 30% over his nearest rival. In the general election Ellison faced Republican Doug Wardlow; Grassroots–Legalize Cannabis Party candidate Noah Johnson endorsed Ellison, but remained on the general election ballot. On November 6, 2018, Ellison won the election for Attorney General by more than 100,000 votes. This made him the first African American elected to statewide office in Minnesota, as well as the first Muslim elected to a statewide office in the United States.

==== Allegations of domestic abuse ====
During the campaign, misconduct allegations surfaced that influenced the election. Politico wrote that Ellison's election would depend on "what voters make of the misconduct allegations he's facing". In 2006, environmental activist Amy Alexander alleged she had been in a romantic relationship with Ellison while he was married and said he had pushed, shoved, and verbally abused her. Ellison denied the accusation and denied they had a romantic relationship. He alleged that Alexander had harassed him and threatened to "destroy" him. A judge granted Ellison's request for a restraining order against Alexander and refused a similar request by Alexander against Ellison.

In August 2018, Ellison's ex-girlfriend Karen Monahan and her son accused him of attempting to drag her off a bed while shouting obscenities. He denied her allegations and said in an interview he did not know how to react because he did not wish to demonize her. A Minnesota Democratic–Farmer–Labor Party investigation conducted by attorney Susan Ellingstad concluded that Monahan's accusation was unsubstantiated, as she rejected requests to provide the video she said proved her allegations. The report states that Monahan would not allow Ellingstad to view the footage privately. Unsealed Hennepin County Family Court divorce records revealed that Ellison had claimed that Kim Ellison had physically abused him.

=== Prosecuting George Floyd's murderer ===
On May 31, 2020, Ellison accepted Minnesota governor Tim Walz's request that he take over as special prosecutor in the Derek Chauvin case. Three days later, Ellison's office charged Derek Chauvin, the officer who knelt on Floyd's neck, with second-degree murder, a more serious charge than Hennepin County attorney Mike Freeman's original charges of third-degree murder and second-degree manslaughter. Ellison also charged the other three officers at the scene, whom Freeman's office had not originally charged, with aiding and abetting second-degree murder and manslaughter. Freeman and trial lawyers Steve Schleicher, Jerry Blackwell and Matthew Frank were among those who served on Ellison's prosecution team. Chauvin was convicted on all three counts on April 20, 2021. Ellison's management of the prosecution won him praise from progressives, and led to speculation that he would seek a higher office.

=== Protecting children and teenagers ===
==== Fighting vaping companies targeting youth ====
On December 4, 2019, Ellison sued e-cigarette company JUUL, alleging that it had violated multiple state consumer-protection laws by designing its products and advertisements to appeal to children and teenagers in an attempt to addict young users. The lawsuit went to trial on March 28, 2023. Minnesota was the first state to take a lawsuit against JUUL to trial. Ellison began the opening argument by saying, "JUUL and [parent company] Altria hooked Minnesotan children on e-cigarettes—so they could make money." The suit was settled on April 17, 2023, with JUUL agreeing to pay the state $60.5 million, which went to programs designed to reduce youth vaping. Ellison said at the time that bringing JUUL to trial resulted in Minnesota receiving the largest settlement per capita of any state.

On January 15, 2025, Ellison sued High Light Vapes, a company that manufactures vapes designed to look like highlighters so teenagers can more easily conceal them. On April 10, he announced that High Light Vapes was banned from doing business in Minnesota.

==== Suing social media companies ====
In November 2021, Ellison joined a bipartisan group of attorneys general investigating Meta, the owner of Instagram, for violating consumer protection laws. The investigation sought to collect information on how Meta works to increase youth engagement and any potential harm to young people's mental health resulting from that increased engagement. In October 2023, Ellison and a bipartisan group of over 30 attorneys general sued Meta for knowingly deploying features to increase youth engagement at the cost of their mental health and for deceiving the public about the platform's harmful effects. In his lawsuit, Ellison alleged that "features like infinite scroll and near-constant alerts were created with the express goal of hooking young users" and addicting them to Instagram.

In August 2025, Ellison announced he was suing TikTok for designing its app to addict young users at the cost of their mental health. His lawsuit alleges that TikTok features like infinite scroll and excessive push notifications prey on the underdeveloped parts of young people's brains to keep them on the app; that TikTok's beauty filters harm young people's self-image; that TikTok knows the filters are harmful; and that TikTok's live-streaming and virtual currency features lead to the sexual exploitation of young users.

In May 2026, Minnesota enacted a law banning prediction markets. Ellison defended the law, calling prediction markets a form of predatory gambling, after the Trump administration, Kalshi, and Polymarket sued the state.

=== Public safety ===
==== Expanding the office's Criminal Division ====
Ellison made it a priority to expand the Criminal Division of the Minnesota Attorney General's Office. He requested additional funding from the legislature to hire more prosecutors, but Republicans in the legislature opposed the funding. In 2023, after the DFL won majorities in both the state House and Senate, Ellison's bill to fund more criminal prosecutors from his office passed and was signed into law.

==== Gun safety litigation ====
On October 5, 2022, Ellison sued Fleet Farm, a hunting and fishing supply retailer, for negligently selling firearms to gun traffickers, also known as straw purchasers. In his lawsuit, he alleged that Fleet Farm sold at least 37 firearms to two straw purchasers over 16 months and that one of the guns sold this way was used in a 2021 shooting that killed one Minnesotan and injured 14 others. Ellison argued that Fleet Farm ignored warning signs that those purchasing those firearms were planning to sell them on the black market. In 2023, he defeated a motion to dismiss Fleet Farm filed. In October 2025, Ellison announced that he had defeated Fleet Farm's motion for summary judgment and that the case would go to trial.

In December 2024, Ellison sued firearm manufacturer Glock, alleging the company violated state consumer fraud, deceptive trade practices, false advertising, negligence, and nuisance laws by knowingly selling semi-automatic pistols that can easily be converted into illegal, fully automatic weapons. He alleged that Glock has known since 1988 that its guns can easily be modified in this way but has refused to change the design to make this illegal modification more difficult. Ellison also alleged that the danger these fully automatic Glocks pose is illustrated in a dramatic increase in automatic weapons fire, according to ShotSpotter data from Minneapolis. The lawsuit notes that ShotSpotter detected 154 automatic gunshots in 2020, 2,033 in 2021, 3,024 in 2022, and 2,595 in 2023.

==== Election safety ====
In October 2020, Ellison launched an investigation into Atlas Aegis, an out-of-state private security company that was recruiting armed guards to patrol Minnesota polling places. In the suit, he cited concern that armed people patrolling polling places could intimidate voters. Days later, Ellison announced he had secured a legally binding agreement preventing the company from following through on its plans.

=== Affordability ===
==== Housing ====
In February 2022, Ellison sued hedge fund-owned landlord Havenbrook Homes, alleging that it violated state law by failing to make numerous crucial repairs to many of the homes it owned in Minnesota, leaving tenants without heat and with mold and live animal infestations, among other things. In March 2024, he announced a settlement requiring Havenbrook Homes to forgive $2 million in outstanding rent and pay tenants it harmed $2.2 million. Ellison also announced that Havenbrook planned to leave Minnesota and transfer its properties to local affordable housing organizations that would rehabilitate the properties and sell them at affordable rates. In October 2025, the first of Havenbrook's former properties was put back on the market.

In October 2023, Ellison sued IPG Properties, a property management company he accused of violating Minnesota law when it began charging tenants exorbitant fees in the middle of their leases. He also filed an emergency motion to prevent IPG from evicting tenants who refused to pay the allegedly unlawful utility fees. Shortly thereafter, IPG agreed to halt eviction proceedings.

==== Prescription drugs ====
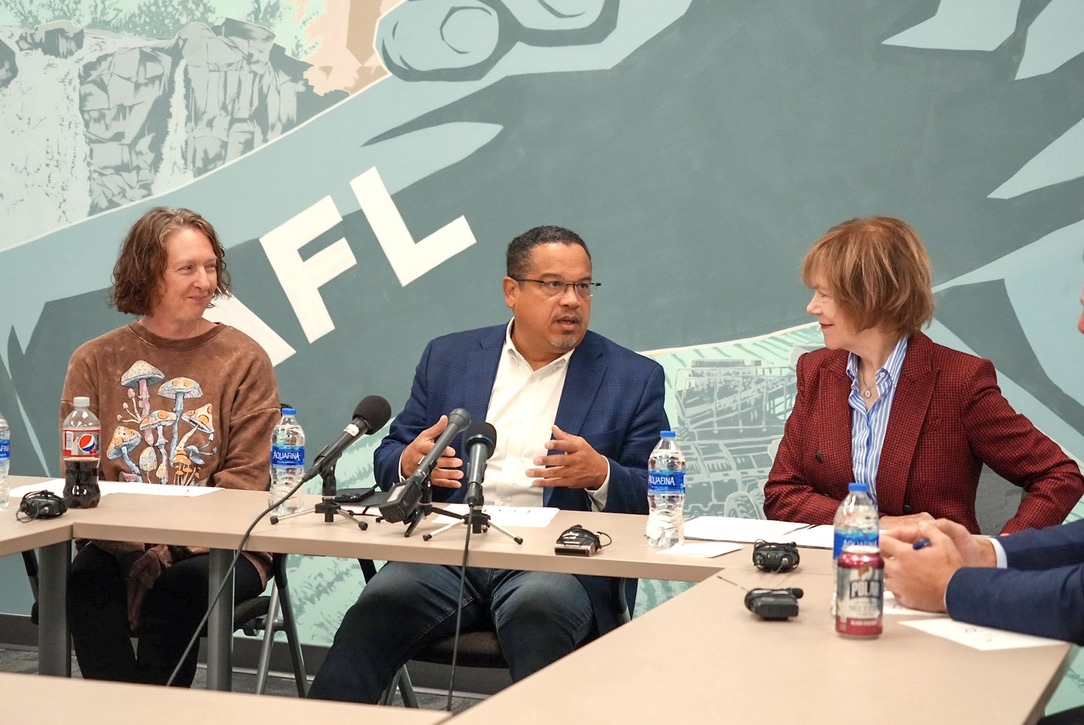
Ellison and U.S. Senator Tina Smith during a panel on the Alec Smith Insulin Affordability Act

In 2024 and 2025, Ellison announced he reached deals with the big three insulin manufacturers to cut the cost of a month's supply of insulin to $35 for the next five years. The settlement agreements resolved several lawsuits filed by the Attorney General's Office that accused the manufacturers of deceptively pricing their products. Part of Ellison's settlement with Eli Lilly also required Lilly to supply free insulin to 15 Minnesota clinics that serve low-income communities.

Shortly after taking office, Ellison launched a task force focused on lowering the price of prescription drugs. In 2023, the Minnesota Legislature signed into law a bill creating the Prescription Drug Affordability Board, a key recommendation of the task force. The Board has the power to review the price of prescription drugs, take testimony, and implement price caps on certain high-priced drugs.

Food prices

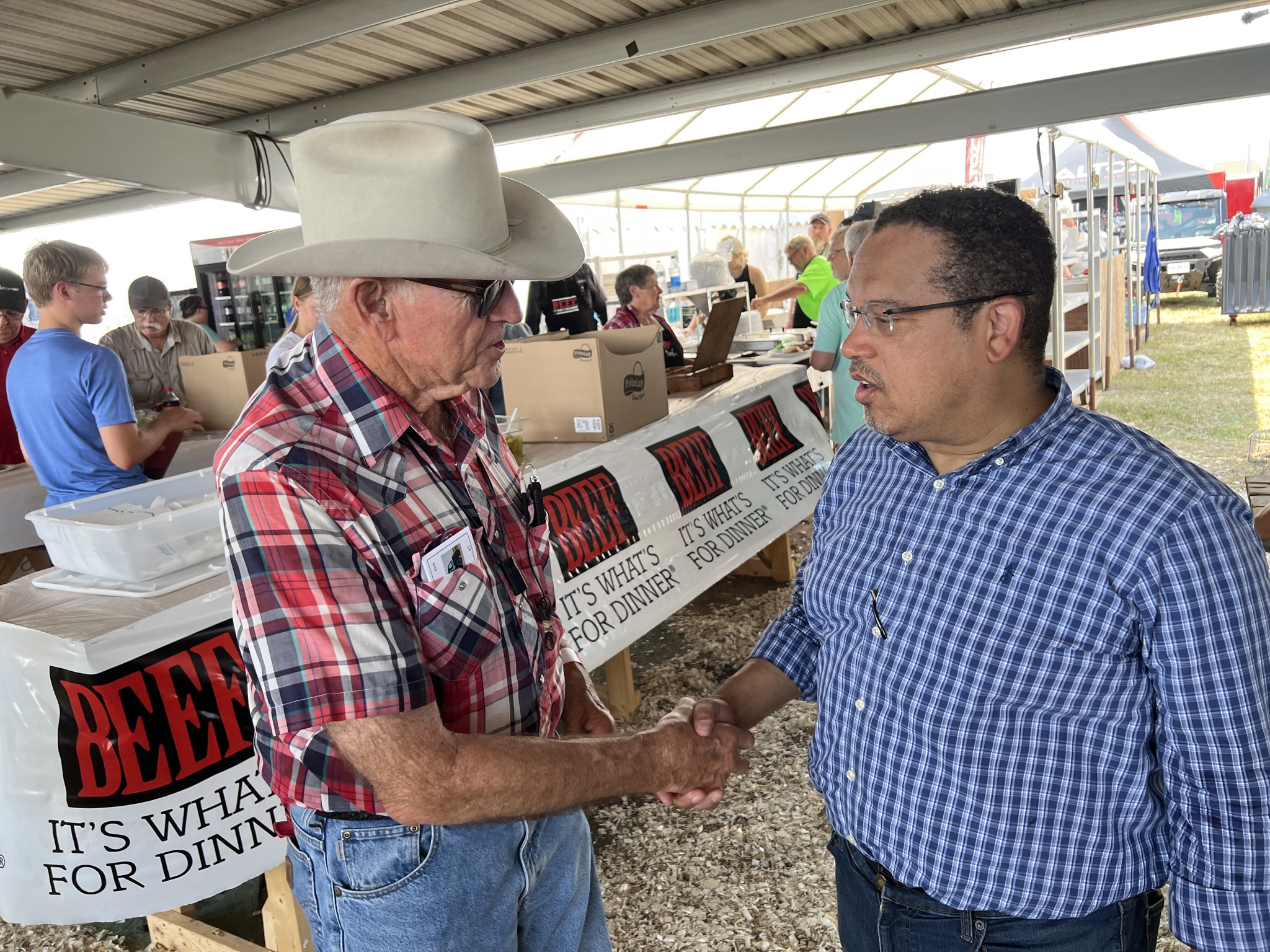
Ellison at Farm Fest in 2022

In September 2021, Ellison sued Sparboe Farms, an egg producer that tripled its prices in March 2020 during the onset of the COVID-19 pandemic. Sparboe settled the case in 2021 and donated over 1 million eggs to nonprofits fighting food insecurity. Ellison also reached a settlement with Forsman Farms in April 2020, ending its attempt to increase egg prices by over 150%.

In November 2023, Ellison sued Agri Stats, alleging that it was sharing competitively sensitive information on input costs, output prices, and much more with meat processors accounting for the vast majority of broiler chicken, turkey, and pork sales in the United States. Ellison alleged Agri Stats knew this data sharing would be used for anti-competitive purposes and that it even encouraged some processors to raise prices to match the competition.

==== Medical debt reform ====
In 2024, Ellison led the passage of the Minnesota Debt Fairness Act alongside Representative Liz Reyer and Senator Liz Boldon. Developed by Ellison, Reyer, and Boldon, the Act bans medical providers from denying medically necessary care to patients with outstanding medical debt. It also ended the practice of automatically transferring a deceased patient's medical debt to their spouse and bans medical debt from being reported to credit agencies. After it passed, Ellison hosted a free legal clinic to inform Minnesotans of their new rights under the law and advise people struggling with medical debt.

== Political positions ==
=== Economy ===
Ellison supports the Reward Work Act of 2018 to reform US labor law and corporate law by guaranteeing the right of employees in listed companies to elect one-third of the board of directors.

=== Abortion ===
In 2009 and 2011 Ellison had a 100% rating from NARAL Pro-Choice America indicating a pro-choice voting record.

=== LGBTQ+ rights ===
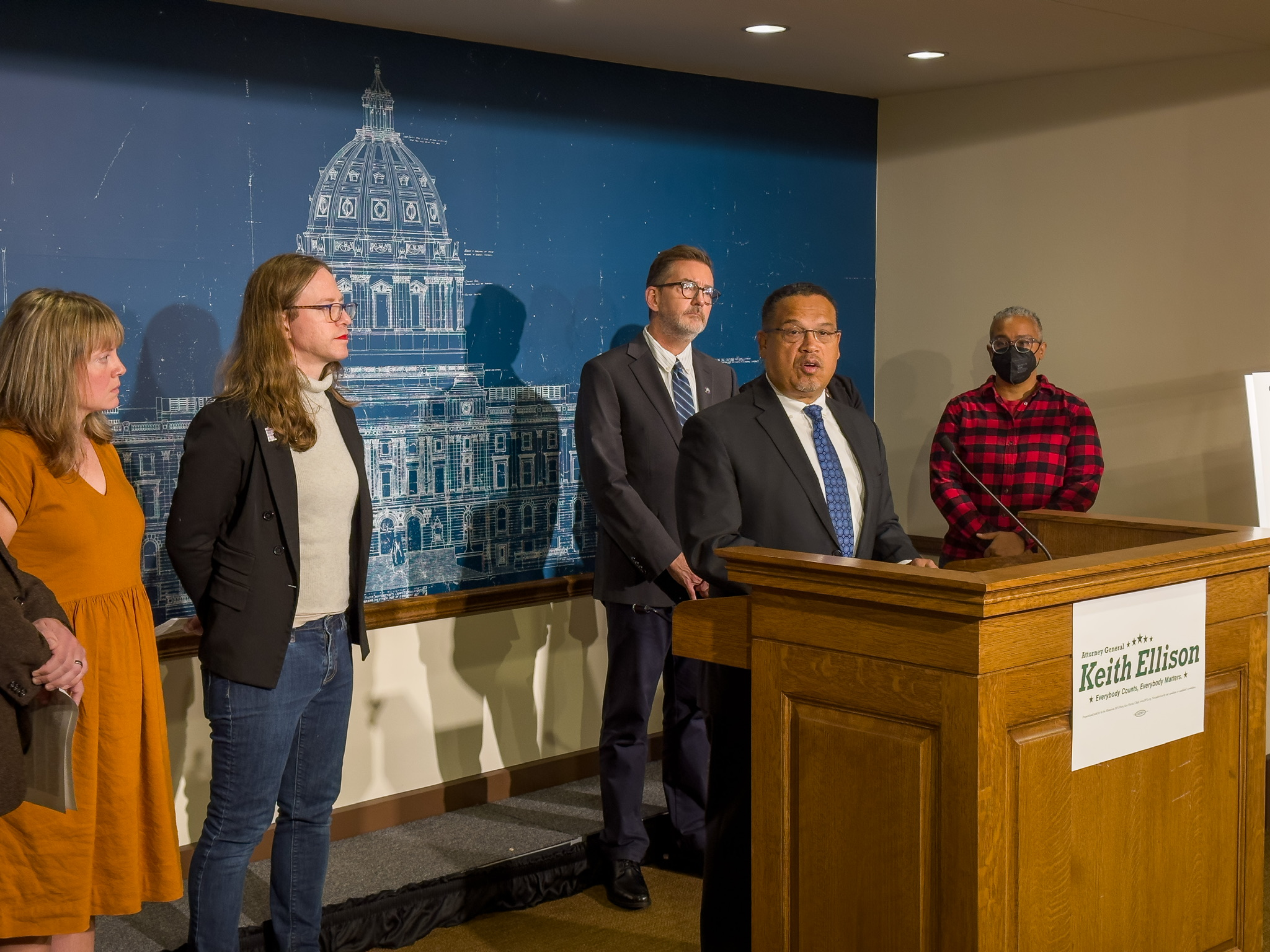
Ellison at a press conference on trans rights

In a November 12, 2010, interview with the BBC's program Outlook, Ellison was asked to describe his constituents. He answered, "The district I represent is the kind of district where you can have a Member of Congress stand up for religious tolerance and against religious bigotry, against anyone, but also stand up for the rights of gays, too." In Congress he served as vice-chair of the Congressional Lesbian Gay Bisexual Transgender Caucus. In 2025, he joined other state attorneys general in a lawsuit against Executive Order 14187, which banned federal funding for gender-affirming care for minors.

=== Gun rights ===
During a March 2014 appearance on Real Time with Bill Maher, Ellison said he was "for gun control, but I don't think you have got to eliminate ownership of all guns in order to get some common-sense gun rules." Host Bill Maher asked him, "Then why doesn't your party come out against the Second Amendment?" Guest Sheila Bair then interjected, "Fifty-one votes, that's all it takes." Ellison responded, "I sure wish they would. I sure wish they would." Ellison's campaign said he was responding to Bair, not to Maher. Bair said she was referring to President Barack Obama's nomination of Vivek Murthy for U.S. Surgeon General. Murthy supports stronger gun regulations.

=== Iraq War ===
After President George W. Bush vetoed HR 1591 that provided military funding for the Iraq War because it contained timetables for withdrawal, Ellison and fellow Minnesota Rep. Betty McCollum, joined House Speaker Nancy Pelosi and other top House Democrats in voting "no" to HR 2206 that provided the funding without any timetables. The bill passed the House on a 280 to 142 margin. Ellison joined fellow Minnesota freshman Democrat Tim Walz in opposing Bush's plan to increase troop levels in Iraq.

On January 10, 2007, Bush announced his plans for the Iraq War troop surge of 2007. The gist of this announcement had been known around the Capitol for over a week, and when the Associated Press asked Ellison for his reaction to the idea on January 8, 2007, he said that it was "way too late, way too little. ... So rather than do something small and ineffective, why not get about the business of what we're going to have to do eventually, which is to begin to end the occupation?" Ellison called for an immediate withdrawal in Iraq: "We could describe it as a redeployment or withdrawal, but I think we have run the course in terms of our ability to resolve this conflict militarily. I think we need to have a political and economic and diplomatic engagement, and we need to encourage the forces that are in Iraq to begin to resolve the violence in Iraq." When asked if he would support Bush's call for an additional $100 billion to fund the wars in Iraq and Afghanistan, Ellison said, "I want to see [the request] first, I want to actually look at it, but I'm not inclined to continue to support a war or an occupation that he has no plans to get us out of, and which is so costly in terms of dollars and lives of American soldiers but also Iraqis." When asked for a reaction to the comments, the White House referred to a previous statement by press secretary Tony Snow: "Democrats will have to decide where they stand on two issues: 'No. 1, do you want Iraq to succeed, and, if so, what does that mean? And, No. 2, do you believe in supporting the troops as you say, and how do you express that support?'"

=== Freedom of speech ===
In 2019, the city of Bloomington passed an ordinance that forbade filming students of Dar Al-Farooq Islamic Center in a public park, which led to a successful lawsuit against the city in the United States Court of Appeals for the Eighth Circuit to reinstate the First Amendment rights of the parties involved. Ellison had asked the court to drop the case.

=== Iran ===
Ellison has supported normalizing Iran-United States relations and reopening an interest section or embassy in Tehran; he was one of only five Democrats in Congress who voted against the 2015 Iran Nuclear Agreement Review Act. In a speech to the National Iranian American Council, he said it does not make sense to cut off contact with the Iranian government, because "when we put up an embassy or an interest section in another country, it's not a gift to them ... You're not doing something for the other country by having someone to look after our interests there, and by withdrawing it, it's not a punishment."

=== Bush administration ===
On June 28, 2007, Ellison cosponsored Representative Dennis Kucinich's bill to impeach Vice President Dick Cheney for "high crimes and misdemeanors." Ellison's spokesperson, Rick Jauert, said the effort was "largely to send a message" and that Ellison "has no illusions that this is going anywhere and that's fine. We've got more important things to do that affect people's daily lives. He basically signed on out of principle, as an expression of the importance of the rule of law—that nobody is above the law, not even the vice president."

On July 8, 2007, Ellison gave a speech in Edina, Minnesota, denouncing Bush's commutation of Lewis Libby's sentence: "If Libby gets pardoned, then he should not have the cover of the Fifth Amendment. He's going to have to come clean and tell the truth. Now, he could get Gonzales-itis [referring to U.S. Attorney General Alberto Gonzales], you know, with 71 lapses of memory within a two-hour period." He also criticized Bush's White House Office of Faith-Based and Community Initiatives, saying, "This is basically the Department of Religious Outreach. ... It's essentially a public-relations outreach arm for the Bush administration to reach out to the far right of the evangelical Christian movement. That's really all it is."

On July 25, 2007, Ellison voted in the House Judiciary Committee to issue citations of contempt of congress to White House Chief of Staff Joshua Bolten and former White House Counsel Harriet Miers for "failure to comply with subpoenas on the firings of several federal prosecutors".

=== Trump administration ===
In 2017, Ellison said he was open to demands to start an impeachment process against President Donald Trump: "Donald Trump has already done a number of things which legitimately raise the question of impeachment." By the December 2019 impeachment of Donald Trump, Ellison was no longer serving in the House of Representatives.

=== Human rights ===
Ellison issued a statement on March 21, 2008, that criticized the Chinese government for its policy regarding Tibet and for its relationship with Sudan's leaders "as they commit genocide on the citizens of Darfur." Ellison was arrested along with seven other people including U.S. Representatives James McGovern, John Lewis, Donna Edwards, and Lynn Woolsey for civil disobedience in April 2009 when they spoke at the Sudanese Embassy in Washington, D.C., to protest that the president of Sudan, Omar al-Bashir, had asked international aid groups bringing food, health care and water, to leave Darfur.

=== Basic income ===
On August 17, 2017, Ellison said he supported guaranteed basic income.

=== 2016 U.S. presidential election endorsements ===
Ellison was the second U.S. Representative (after Raúl Grijalva) to endorse Bernie Sanders for president in the 2016 Democratic primary. He endorsed Hillary Clinton after she secured the party's nomination.

=== 2020 U.S. presidential election endorsements ===
On June 28, 2019, Ellison endorsed Bernie Sanders for president, citing Medicare for All. He endorsed Joe Biden after Biden won the Democratic nomination.

== Travels abroad ==
=== Middle East ===
In late March and early April 2007, Ellison was a member of a congressional delegation on a "fact-finding trip to the Middle East". The group included Representatives Henry Waxman, Tom Lantos, Louise Slaughter, Nick Rahall, Dave Hobson, who were led by Speaker Nancy Pelosi. The delegation visited the Church of the Holy Sepulchre and the Western Wall. Ellison called his visit to Islam's third-holiest site, the Al-Aqsa Mosque, as "personally moving". The group met with Israeli prime minister Ehud Olmert and discussed the peace plan devised by the Saudis in 2002. The delegation also met with Palestinian Authority President Mahmoud Abbas.

The group's visit to Syria was criticized by the Bush administration, which restated its view that the United States should not have diplomatic relations with state sponsors of terrorism. While there the delegation conveyed a message from Olmert to Syrian president Bashar al-Assad that "Israel is interested in peace if Damascus stops supporting terrorism". In Lebanon the group met with Prime Minister Fouad Siniora and Speaker Nabih Berri. They also visited the grave of Rafik Hariri and met with his son Saad Hariri. In Saudi Arabia the group spoke to King Abdullah and his Shura Council of advisers. They praised his peace plan and advocated a greater role for women in his nation's political process. Ellison's inclusion in the delegation was praised by council member Abdul-Rahman al-Zamel. Ellison called the king a "visionary leader" and said, "Even being in the same country where Mecca and Medina are located was personally uplifting for me." Ellison also said he hoped his presence as a Muslim among the delegation conveyed a message to the Israelis and Palestinians that "people can come together. Reconciliation is possible."

==== Iraq ====
On July 28 and 29, 2007, Ellison was among an "all-freshman bipartisan congressional delegation" visiting Iraq, arranged by Defense Secretary Robert Gates and led by Rep. Jerry McNerney. Before the trip Ellison told reporters that he would be stopping over in Germany to visit wounded U.S. soldiers being treated there. He also said that he respected any politician who visited Iraq, making note of Republican Minnesota governor Tim Pawlenty, who went in February 2007, along with five other governors. Ellison said, "If this country is going to ask these young people to stand in a war zone, their political leadership should visit them." In Iraq the delegation met with Iraqi and U.S. military officials, including Gen. David Petraeus.

==== Israel and Palestine ====
Soon after he returned from Iraq, Ellison and 19 other representatives took a week-long trip to Israel sponsored by the American Israel Education Foundation. House Majority Leader Steny Hoyer led the group and personally invited Ellison to join them for a stay from August 12–18, 2007. The group met with Israeli prime minister Ehud Olmert and Palestinian president Mahmoud Abbas. Ellison's spokesperson told reporters that the trip was "a natural extension of his visit to Iraq" and that "the Middle East peace issue is important to the diverse communities of his Minneapolis-area district—from the Jewish Community Relations Council to the patrons of the Holy Land Middle Eastern eatery on Lake Street and Central Avenue. He hears about it every time he goes back to his district." The group traveled to Jerusalem, Tel Aviv, the northern Galilee region, and Ramallah, and viewed the Israeli border with Lebanon.

During this trip Ellison said that Israel did not permit him to travel to Gaza, where a conflict was occurring. In a 2009 interview with reporter Shihab Rattansi, Ellison expressed his disappointment at his inability to see the humanitarian situation for himself and called for a more open discussion on Gaza, saying: "The people who have a strong sympathy for the Israeli position ... dominate the conversation. And it's really not politically safe to say, look, there are two sides to this, and Israel has not been an angel in this, and certainly there have been people on the Palestinian side who have not contributed to a constructive solution."

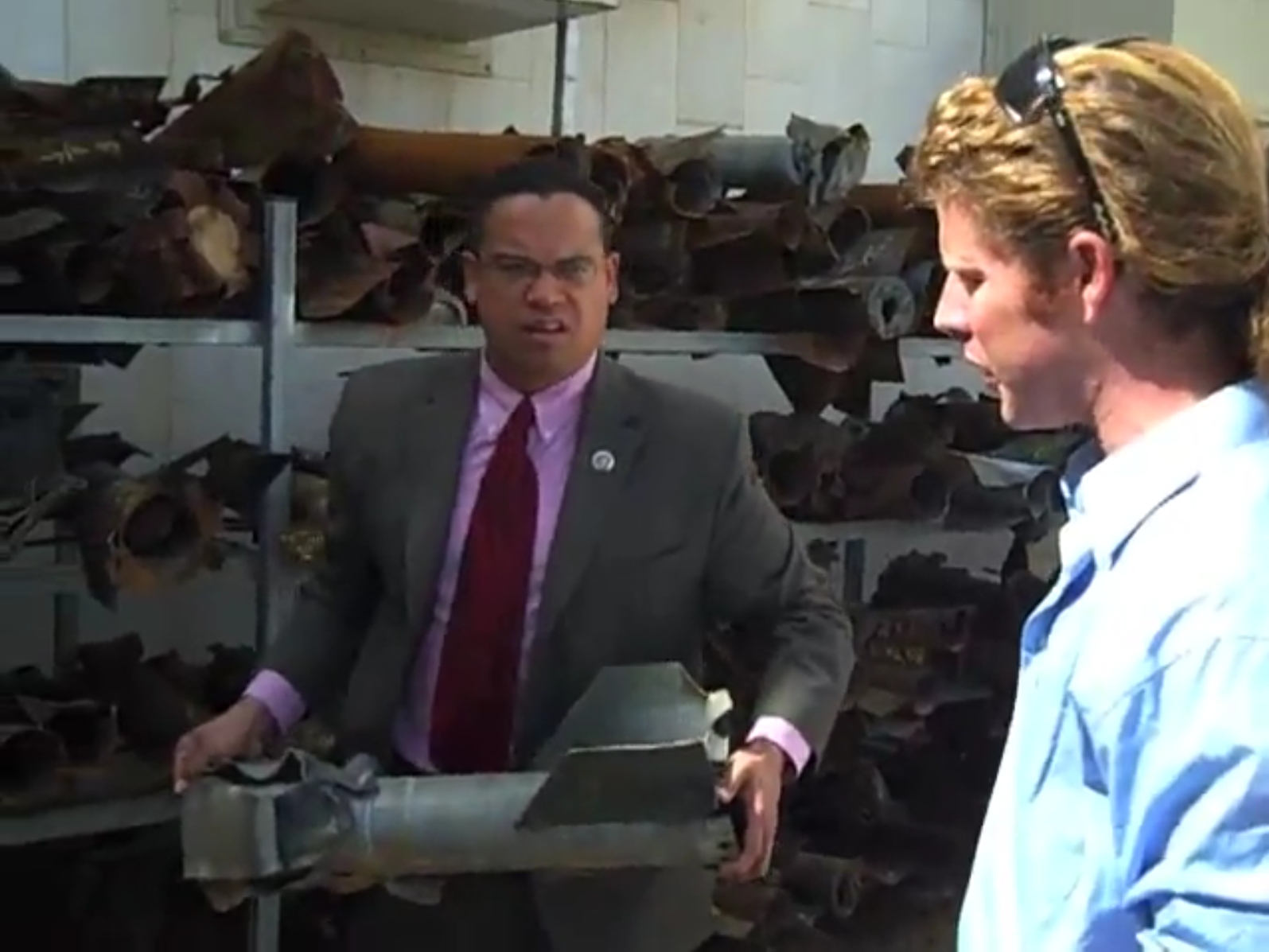
Ellison holds up a Qassam rocket fired at Sderot.

During the summer 2014 conflict between Hamas and Israel, Ellison published an editorial in The Washington Post that called for an end to the blockade in Gaza. Citing his three trips to Gaza since 2009, Ellison suggested that empowering Gazans by ending the blockade would weaken extremists and help move towards final status peace.

==== Gaza and Sderot ====
On February 19, 2009, Ellison and fellow Representative Brian Baird visited Gaza to view the destruction from the Gaza War and to meet with international and local relief agencies, including the United Nations Relief and Works Agency for Palestine Refugees in the Near East. This visit, which Ellison and Baird say did not have the official sanction of the Obama administration, was the first time any U.S. government official had entered Gaza in more than three years. Ellison said: “The stories about the children affected me the most. No parent, or anyone who cares for kids, can remain unmoved by what Brian and I saw here.“ The following day Ellison and Baird visited the Israeli towns of Sderot and Ashkelon, which were the targets of numerous Qassam rocket attacks, repeatedly launched from within the Gaza Strip.

=== Norway ===
Ellison visited Norway in January 2008 because of Norway's prominent role in the Israeli-Palestinian peace process, and because of the Norwegian-American heritage of many of his constituents. While there, Ellison met with former Norwegian prime minister Kjell Magne Bondevik, then president of the Oslo Center for Peace and Human Rights. The Star Tribune reported that the "trip underscores Ellison's desire to play a role in the international peace movement."

=== Africa ===
In mid-2008, Ellison joined a U.S. House Democracy Assistance Commission delegation that traveled to six African countries, including Liberia, Democratic Republic of the Congo, Malawi, Mauritania and Kenya. Upon returning, Ellison said: "The people of the 5th congressional district [his own] know that, in this globalized world, to have peace and security relies on other people having a modicum of peace and security." He attended a July 4 reception at the U.S. ambassador's residence in Nairobi, Kenya, where Ellison met Sarah Hussein Onyango Obama, the step-grandmother of then-presidential candidate Barack Obama.

== Advocacy for American Muslims ==
With his victory to the United States House of Representatives Ellison became the first Muslim elected to the U.S. Congress and the highest Muslim elected official in the United States, with Congressman André Carson elected in 2008, as the only other Muslim serving in the U.S. Congress. Ellison's election has been seen as inspirational to American Muslims, and he encourages civic empowerment through participation in the political process. Ellison generally "downplayed the role of religion in his drive for office", but he has become active in advocacy for Muslim American civic engagement and civil rights causes on a national level since.

=== North American Imams Federation ===
On November 18, 2006, Ellison gave a speech called "Imams and Politics" to the Fourth Annual Body Meeting of the North American Imams Federation. The Federation's materials presented the issues to be outlined in Ellison's speech as follows: "Many Muslims around the United States are involved in political activities at different levels. Recognizing the sensitivity of political issues and the potential for divisiveness within the communities as a result of divergent political views, Imams must be able to provide Muslims with the proper guidance and educate them on the etiquettes of any political involvement within the Islamic context. Questions also arise on whether Imams and Islamic centers should be involved in politics at all and what the extent of this involvement should be, therefore Imams should have the ability to address these concerns. Overall, it is important that Imams are aware and understand the general political climate of their communities and be especially conversant with the issues that affect Muslims." Ellison also took part in "Community Night" with Imam Siraj Wahhaj, and Imam Dr. Omar Shahin. This was "for Imams to meet and interact with community members." Some of the participants of this meeting became involved in the Flying Imams controversy after being removed from an Arizona bound plane for "concerning behavior". Ellison became involved in this controversy shortly after it erupted when he attempted to arrange a meeting between parties including US Airways executives, the Metropolitan Airports Commission, and other legislators and community members.

=== MOSES interfaith group ===
On December 27, 2006, Ellison spoke at a meeting in Holy Redeemer Catholic Church in Detroit for Metropolitan Organizing Strategy Enabling Strength (MOSES). The meeting was with leaders from the Catholic, Muslim, and Arab-American communities, along with members of the organized labor movement. He told those in attendance that the principles of Islam guide his life, but he has no intention of imposing his faith on others, "I'm not a religious leader, I've never led religious services of any kind. I'm not here to be a preacher, but in terms of political agenda items, my faith informs me." He addressed the Qur'an Oath controversy of the 110th United States Congress and said that he hoped religion could be a uniting, rather than a dividing force: "They've never actually tried to explore how religion should connect us, they're into how religion divides us. ... They haven't really explored ... how my faith connects me to you."

== Promoting U.S. with the State Department ==
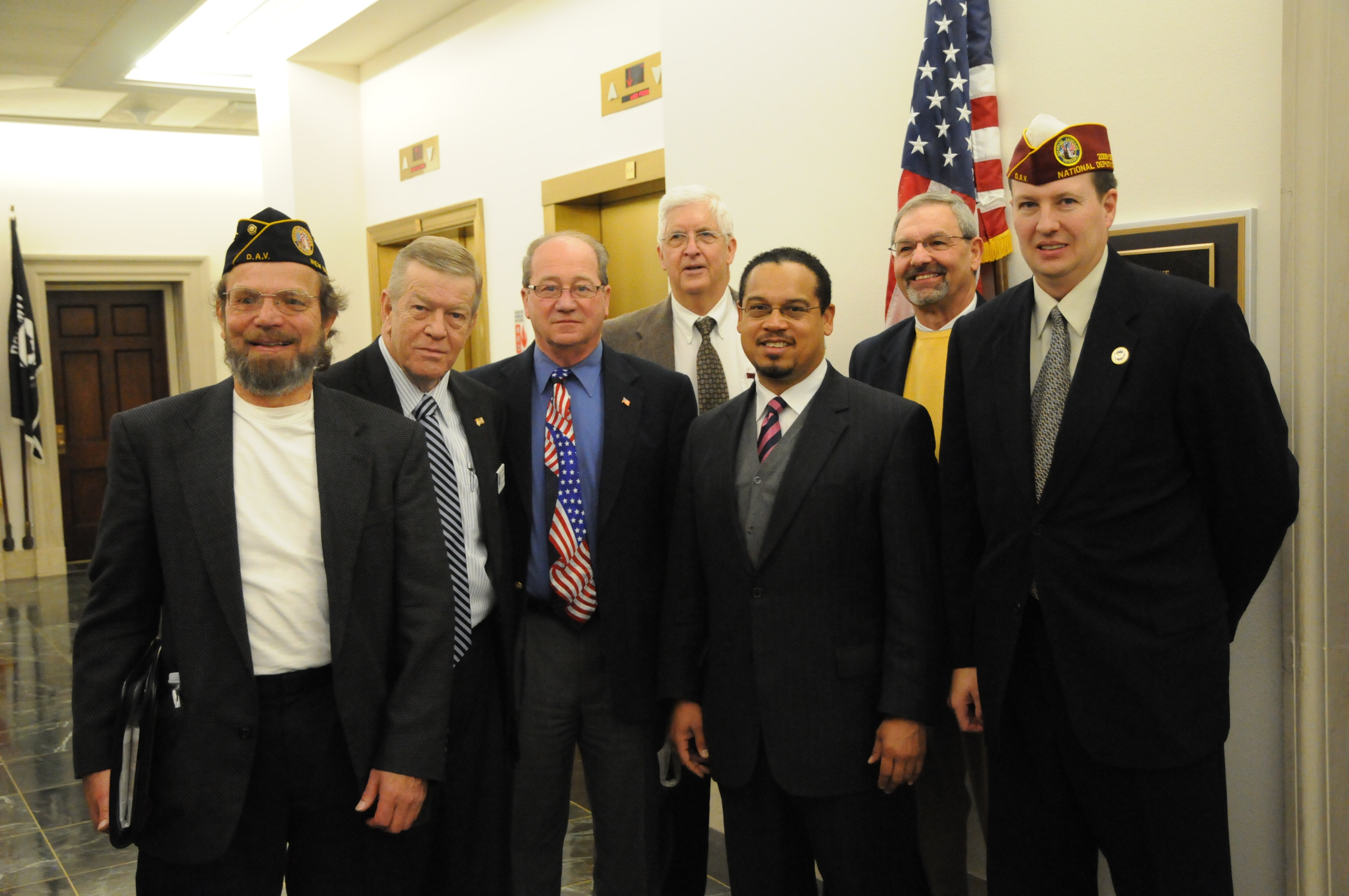
Ellison with Minnesota Disabled Veterans

Two months after taking office, Ellison met with Secretary of State Condoleezza Rice and other top State Department officials to talk about "showcasing his story as part of their public diplomacy efforts in the Muslim world." According to the Star Tribune, Ellison was "profiled three times by the State Department's overseas press bureau." He also "did a Voice of America interview from his office, where an American flag was placed conspicuously behind his desk for the cameras." In the interview which was set to play in the Middle East and South Asia, Ellison stressed global inclusiveness and quoted verse 49:13 of the Qur'an "Oh humanity, We created you from a single pair". Ellison also accepted the Bush administration's request to be part of a "teleconference with Karen Hughes, the State Department's undersecretary for public diplomacy. The White House has asked that the teleconference promote American values and confront ideological support for terrorism around the world." The Voice of America applauded Ellison's cooperation saying "He is the most famous freshman congressman in the world."

After he took his oath of office he was surrounded by the foreign press, intrigued in part by the oath controversy, who "had to be ushered out of his office after he took his oath to make room for home-state news crews." Ellison has been "featured in a series of articles written for foreign dissemination by the Department's Bureau of International Information Programs." Including an article that was translated into Persian and Arabic that "highlighted the diversity of his constituents in Minnesota, ranging from Swedes and Norwegians to 'the largest Somali immigrant community in America.'" In his work in cooperation with the state department, Ellison stresses the religious freedom available in the U.S., saying things like "religious tolerance has a much longer pedigree in America than some of the intolerance we've seen lately." Even in his work with the State Department he remained critical of President Bush's Iraq policy saying "he wants people around the world to know that 'there are many Americans who want to relate to the rest of the world in terms of cooperation, not military domination.'" Ellison staffers told reporters that "the State Department has shown no signs of squeamishness about publicizing his criticism of the war." When asked about working with elements of the Bush administration Ellison said "Hey, my country first. We can work out our political differences later. I've said I'm willing to do whatever I can to make some friends for America."

== Public profile ==
=== Interview with Glenn Beck ===
On November 14, 2006, Glenn Beck of CNN Headline News said to Ellison, "I have been nervous about this interview with you, because what I feel like saying is, 'Sir, prove to me that you are not working with our enemies.' And I know you're not. I'm not accusing you of being an enemy, but that's the way I feel, and I think a lot of Americans will feel that way." Ellison replied that his constituents, "know that I have a deep love and affection for my country. There's no one who's more patriotic than I am, and so you know, I don't need to — need to prove my patriotic stripes."

When asked by Beck for his opinion on Muslim extremists, Ellison replied, "They're criminals. But I think that people who commit criminal acts should be treated like criminals, regardless of their faith." He also said, "Osama bin Laden no more represents Islam than Timothy McVeigh represented Christianity." Asked about the incident later, Ellison dismissed it, saying, "It's just shock TV. Some pundits think they have to ask the most outrageous questions."

On January 2, 2007, Beck said on his radio program that Ellison did not take offense at the comments and the two had a friendly chat off the air. On January 9, 2007, at the Television Critics Association's semiannual press tour, Beck said it was "Quite possibly the poorest-worded question of all time." He clarified by saying, "My point to Keith Ellison ... is the same point that I make to my own faith, and that is—you must stand up before things get out of control ... And it's important for people of all faiths, when someone is hijacking their religion, to stand and say, 'That is not what we do. That is not who we are."'

=== Nation of Islam affiliation ===
As a law student in 1989 and 1990 Ellison wrote several columns under the name "Keith E. Hakim" in the student newspaper, the Minnesota Daily. He defended Louis Farrakhan against claims of racism, and further wrote that Farrakhan "is also not an anti-Semite" and called affirmative action a "sneaky" form of compensation for slavery, suggesting that white Americans instead pay reparations to blacks. Mother Jones reported that, under the name "Keith X Ellison," he wrote defenses of Farrakhan against accusations of antisemitism after the 1995 Million Man March, and again in 1997. James Muhammad, a former leader of the Nation of Islam's Twin Cities study group, has said that Ellison served for several years as the group's "chief of protocol", in which capacity he acted as a liaison between Muhammad and local communities.

==== Denunciation of the Nation of Islam in 2006 ====
During Ellison's 2006 campaign Republican blogger Michael Brodkorb unearthed posts about Ellison's Minnesota Daily articles and his involvement with the Nation of Islam. In response Ellison wrote a letter to the Jewish Community Relations Council of Minnesota & the Dakotas stating he had never been a member, and that his connections with the Nation of Islam were limited to an 18-month period during which he helped organize the Minnesota contingent at the 1995 Million Man March. In 2016, CNN referred instead to Ellison's "decade-long involvement in the Nation of Islam". Ellison's letter denounced the Nation of Islam and Farrakhan: "I wrongly dismissed concerns that they [Farrakhan's remarks] were anti-Semitic. They were and are anti-Semitic and I should have come to that conclusion earlier than I did". He explained his previous views by saying that he "did not adequately scrutinize the positions and statements of the Nation of Islam, Louis Farrakhan, and Khalid Muhammed." He also wrote, "any kind of discrimination and hate are wrong. This has always been my position". During the 2006 campaign many prominent Jewish DFL activists supported Ellison, including fundraisers Samuel and Sylvia Kaplan and State Representative Phyllis Kahn, who said it was "inconceivable that he could have ever been an antisemite."

=== Campaign contributions from members of CAIR ===
During the 2006 election Nihad Awad, executive director of the Council on American–Islamic Relations (CAIR) and James Yee, the former Muslim chaplain at Guantanamo Bay, spoke at an August 25 fundraiser for Ellison. Awad and Ellison knew each other as they attended the University of Minnesota Law School at the same time. According to the Minneapolis Star Tribune, Ellison accepted individual contributions from Nihad Awad and another leader of CAIR; Ellison responded that he had fully disclosed all contributions and said that he had "nothing to hide". Ellison stressed that he was supported by individuals, and that the non-profit organization itself did not endorse his candidacy. His Republican opponent in the race, Alan Fine, criticized Ellison for accepting these contributions, saying that CAIR was "a group that Democrats say has deep ties to terrorism". In response to Ellison's opponents, CAIR leaders Parvez Ahmed and Nihad Awad wrote, "We are proud of our personal donations to Ellison's campaign" and derided any 'guilt by association' arguments.

=== Reichstag fire and 9/11 ===
On July 8, 2007, Ellison discussed the power of the executive branch in a speech before the organization Atheists for Human Rights. He said that Dick Cheney said it was "beneath his dignity in order for him to answer any questions from the citizens of the United States. That is the very definition of totalitarianism, authoritarianism and dictatorship." He went on to say, "It's almost like the Reichstag fire, kind of reminds me of that. After the Reichstag was burned, they blamed the Communists for it and it put the leader of that country, Hitler, in a position where he could basically have authority to do whatever he wanted. The fact is that I'm not saying September 11 was a U.S. plan or anything like that because, you know, that's how they put you in the nut-ball box — dismiss you."

Fox News picked up the story and their commentator John Gibson categorized Ellison's comments as accusing President George W. Bush "of planning and executing the 9/11 attacks". In Congress, Representatives Eric Cantor and Zach Wamp wrote House Speaker Nancy Pelosi demanding she "swiftly and immediately" reprimand Ellison for his remarks. The letter said, "Even if Ellison asserts that he was not implying that 9/11 was orchestrated by the administration, the comparison he draws between Hitler and the President of United States is disgraceful. These comments inflame hatred and division at a time when we should be promoting our unity and reconciliation." The Anti-Defamation League also said: "Whatever his views may be on the administration's response to 9/11 and the conduct of the war on terrorism, likening it to Hitler's rise to power and Nazism is odious and demeans the victims of 9/11 and the brave American men and women engaged in the war on terror. Furthermore, it demonstrates a profound lack of understanding about the horrors that Hitler and his Nazi regime perpetrated."

When later questioned about his comments, Ellison told a reporter that Osama bin Laden, and not the Bush administration, was responsible for the attacks. He added, "In the aftermath of a tragedy, space is opened up for governments to take action that they could not have achieved before that." He pointed to the Iraq War and provisions granting greater arrest and surveillance powers within the USA PATRIOT Act as examples. Ellison also said:

In response to a question, I stated that the Bush Administration exploited post-9/11 fears to advance a policy agenda that has undermined our civil liberties. I stand by this statement. ... I want to be clear that the murderous Nazi regime is historically distinct and the horror of the Holocaust must be acknowledged as a unique event in human history. I did not intend any direct comparison between the totalitarian state of Nazi Germany and the current administration. I have taken consistent and strong stands against Holocaust denial throughout my life in public service.

=== Sali remarks ===
Representative Bill Sali of Idaho drew criticism for his comments in an August 8, 2007, interview with the conservative Christian-based American Family News Network. Sali, an outspoken Evangelical Christian, denounced the Senate leadership for allowing a Hindu to lead the opening prayer, claiming that the non-Christian invocation threatened to endanger America by removing "the protective hand of God." Former Democratic Idaho congressman Richard Stallings, among others, demanded that Sali either apologize or resign. In response, Sali sent Ellison an email saying he "meant no offense". Ellison was in Iraq with a congressional delegation, but his spokesperson, Micah Clemens, said, "The congressman just doesn't respond to comments like that." A New York Sun editorial wrote that claims that the founders did not anticipate Muslim legislators are incorrect. The specific subject was brought up in several state conventions to ratify the Constitution; William Lancaster opposed the prospect during North Carolina's 1788 Hillsborough Convention.

== Personal life ==
Ellison has been married to Mónica Hurtado since December 1, 2018. Ellison and his former wife, Kim, a high school mathematics teacher, had four children between 1989 and 1997. Keith Ellison is a Muslim, and although Kim Ellison is not, the Ellisons' four children were raised in the Muslim faith. One of their sons, Jeremiah, was elected to the Minneapolis City Council. During Ellison's 2006 campaign Kim Ellison revealed that she had been living with moderate multiple sclerosis for several years. Keith Ellison filed for legal separation from Kim Ellison in 2010, and their divorce was finalized on May 2, 2012. Kim Ellison was elected to the Minneapolis School Board in 2012 as vice-chair and in November 2016 as an at-large member.

== Awards ==
The American-Arab Anti-Discrimination Committee gave Ellison its Trailblazer Award. He was named an Utne Reader visionary in 2011.

== Memoirs ==
Ellison's book My Country 'Tis of Thee was published in 2014. His personal account of the events surrounding the murder of George Floyd and trial of Derek Chauvin for that murder appear in his book Break the Wheel: Ending the Cycle of Police Violence.

== Electoral history ==
=== Minnesota House of Representatives ===
Minnesota House of Representatives – District 58B, 2002
Party	Candidate	Votes	%	±%
Democratic (DFL)	Keith Ellison	5,714	66.54	−
Republican	Larissa Presho	1,212	14.11	−
Independent	Duane K. Reed	726	8.45	−
Green	Bonnie J. Smith	480	5.59	−
Independence	Jay Ceril Mastrud	440	5.12	−

Minnesota House of Representatives – District 58B, 2004
Party	Candidate	Votes	%	±%
Democratic (DFL)	Keith Ellison	10,796	84.1	+17.6
Republican	Jay Ceril Mastrud	1,988	15.5	+1.49

=== U.S. House of Representatives ===
Minnesota 5th congressional district election, 2006
Party	Candidate	Votes	%	±%
Democratic (DFL)	Keith Ellison	136,060	55.56	−
Republican	Alan Fine	52,263	21.34	−
Independence	Tammy Lee	51,456	21.01	−
Green	Jay Pond	4,792	1.96	–

Minnesota 5th congressional district election, 2008
Party	Candidate	Votes	%	±%
Democratic (DFL)	Keith Ellison	228,753	70.9	+14.9
Republican	Barb Davis White	71,013	22.0	+.66
Independence	Bill McGaughey	22,315	6.9	−14.11

Minnesota 5th congressional district election, 2010
Party	Candidate	Votes	%	±%
Democratic (DFL)	Keith Ellison	154,833	67.7	−3.2
Republican	Joel Demos	55,222	24.1	+2.1
Independent	Lynn Torgerson	8,548	3.7	−
Independence	Tom Schrunk	7,446	3.3	−3.6

Minnesota 5th congressional district election, 2012
Party	Candidate	Votes	%	±%
Democratic (DFL)	Keith Ellison	262,101	74.5	+6.8
Republican	Chris Fields	88,753	25.2	+1.1

Minnesota 5th congressional district election, 2014
Party	Candidate	Votes	%	±%
Democratic (DFL)	Keith Ellison	167,079	70.8	−3.7
Republican	Doug Daggett	56,577	24.0	−1.2
Independence	Lee Bauer	12,001	5.1	−

Minnesota 5th congressional district election, 2016
Party	Candidate	Votes	%	±%
Democratic (DFL)	Keith Ellison	249,597	69.2	−1.6
Republican	Frank Drake	80,660	22.3	−1.7
Legal Marijuana Now Party (politician)	Dennis Schuller	30,759	8.5	−

=== Minnesota Attorney General ===
Minnesota Attorney General election, 2018
Primary election
Party	Candidate	Votes	%
Democratic (DFL)	Keith Ellison	281,142	49.8
Democratic (DFL)	Debra Hilstrom	108,048	19.1
Democratic (DFL)	Tom Foley	70,786	12.5
Democratic (DFL)	Matt Pelikan	59,876	10.6
Democratic (DFL)	Mike Rothman	44,522	7.9
Total votes		564,374	100.0

Minnesota Attorney General election, 2018
Party	Candidate	Votes	%	±%
Democratic (DFL)	Keith Ellison	1,249,407	48.96%	−3.64%
Republican	Doug Wardlow	1,150,459	45.08%	+6.07%
Grassroots	Noah Johnson	145,748	5.71%	N/A
n/a	Write-ins	6,158	0.24%	+0.20%
Total votes		2,551,772	100.0%	N/A
Democratic (DFL) hold				

Minnesota Attorney General election, 2022
Party	Candidate	Votes	%	±%
Democratic (DFL)	Keith Ellison (incumbent)	1,254,370	50.37%	+1.41%
Republican	Jim Schultz	1,233,563	49.53%	+4.45%
Write-in		2,374	0.10%	-0.14%
Total votes		2,490,307	100.0%	N/A
Democratic (DFL) hold				

== See also ==
- List of African-American United States representatives
- List of Muslim members of the United States Congress
- List of United States representatives from Minnesota
- Minnesota's congressional delegations

U.S. House of Representatives
Preceded by Martin Sabo	Member of the U.S. House of Representatives from Minnesota's 5th congressional district 2007–2019	Succeeded by Ilhan Omar
Party political offices
Preceded by Lynn Woolsey	Chair of the Congressional Progressive Caucus; 2011–2017; Served alongside: Raúl Grijalva	Succeeded by Mark Pocan
Preceded by Lori Swanson	Democratic nominee for Attorney General of Minnesota; 2018, 2022, 2026	Most recent
Legal offices
Preceded by Lori Swanson	Attorney General of Minnesota; 2019-present	Incumbent
U.S. order of precedence (ceremonial)
Preceded by Gil Gutknecht as Former U.S. Representative	Order of precedence of the United States as Former U.S. Representative	Succeeded by Darlene Hooley as Former U.S. Representative
