= Jeremy Miller (politician) =

American politician

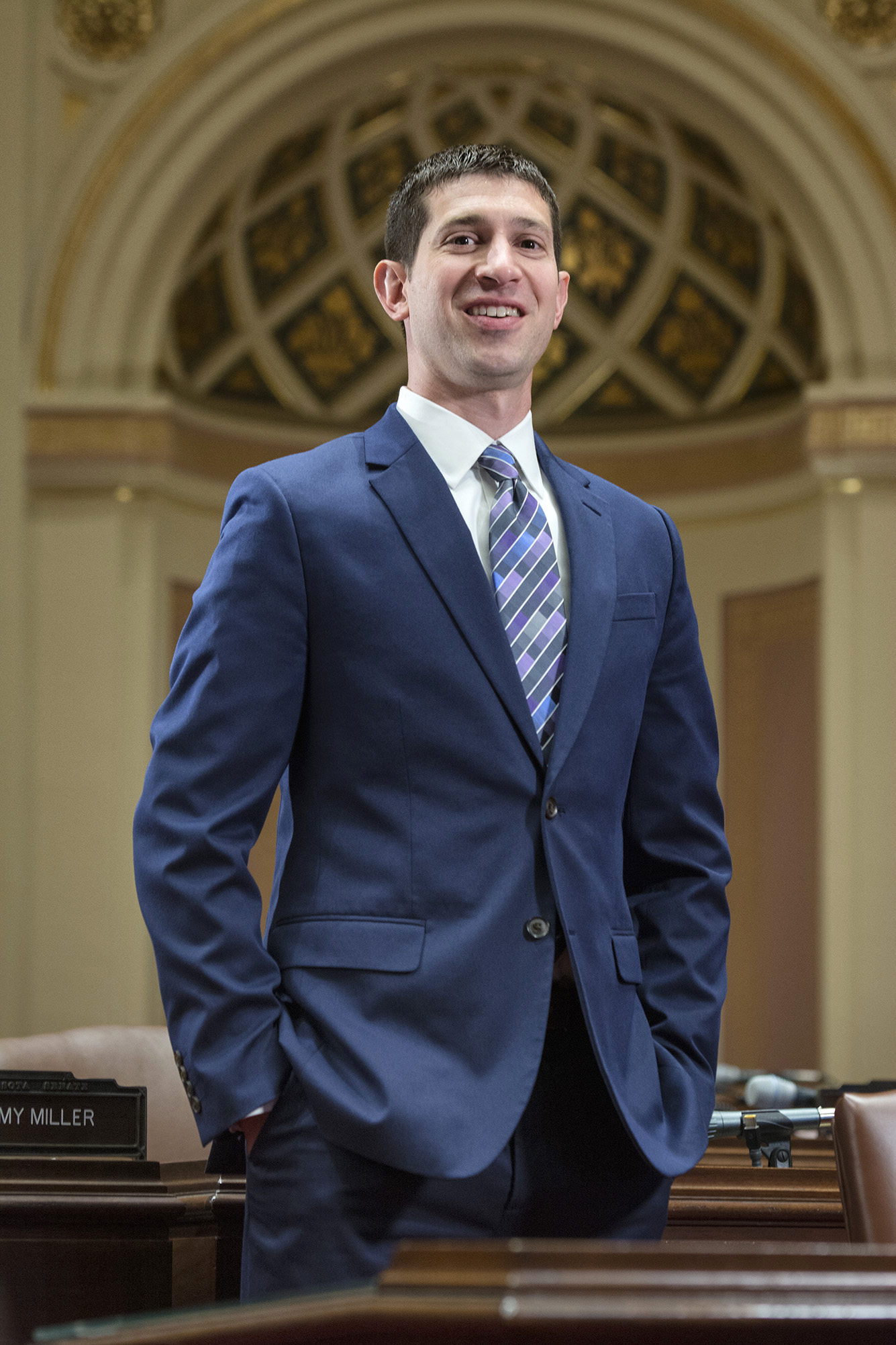
- Official portrait, 2017

President of the Minnesota Senate
- In office January 14, 2025 – February 3, 2025 Serving with Bobby Joe Champion
- Preceded by: Bobby Joe Champion
- Succeeded by: Bobby Joe Champion
- In office January 7, 2021 – January 31, 2022
- Preceded by: David Tomassoni
- Succeeded by: David Osmek
- In office January 7, 2019 – November 12, 2020
- Preceded by: Michelle Fischbach
- Succeeded by: David Tomassoni

Majority Leader of the Minnesota Senate
- In office September 9, 2021 – January 3, 2023
- Preceded by: Paul Gazelka
- Succeeded by: Kari Dziedzic

Member of the Minnesota Senate
- Incumbent
- Assumed office January 4, 2011
- Preceded by: Sharon Erickson Ropes
- Constituency: 26th district (2023–present); 28th district (2013–2023); 31st district (2011–2013)

Personal details
- Born: February 9, 1983 (age 43) Winona, Minnesota, U.S.
- Party: Republican
- Spouse: Janel Ellinghuysen
- Children: 3
- Education: Minnesota State College, Winona

Jeremy R. Miller (born February 9, 1983) is an American politician representing District 26 in the Minnesota Senate, which comprises parts of Fillmore, Houston, and Winona Counties in the southeastern part of the state. He served as the Minnesota Senate Majority Leader from September 2021 to January 2023.

== Education ==
Miller graduated from Winona Senior High School in 2001, and earned his A.A.S. from Minnesota State College-Southeast Technical in Winona in 2004.

== Business activities ==
Miller is the co-owner of Miller Scrap, a scrap metal business.

== Minnesota Senate ==
Miller was first elected to the Senate in 2010, defeating incumbent DFL legislator Sharon Erickson Ropes, and has been reelected four times since. In 2019, he was selected by his caucus to serve as president of the Senate, succeeding Michelle Fischbach, who resigned to become lieutenant governor. In January 2021, Miller was reelected to the position. In September 2021, after Paul Gazelka stepped down as majority leader to run for governor, Republicans elected Miller leader of their caucus, making him the majority leader of the Minnesota State Senate.

Miller considered running for Congress in the 2018 election for the Minnesota's 1st district, covering parts of southern Minnesota; the seat was open because Representative Tim Walz sought the governorship instead. Miller ultimately opted not to run.

Miller has been an outspoken supporter of expanding sports betting throughout Minnesota, authoring multiple bills aimed toward legalization.

Miller is not seeking reelection in 2026, saying that he "is looking forward to being home more often with his family, growing his business, and volunteering".

== Personal life ==
Miller is married to Janel (Ellinghuysen) and they have three children. He is Jewish.

Miller is a small business owner, and the chief financial officer of Wm. Miller Scrap Iron and Metal Co. in Winona, a family-owned and operated recycling business that dates to 1910. Miller and his two brothers, Todd and Willie, are the fourth generation of their family to be involved in the business and work together with their father and employees.

Miller is a director on the Winona State University Warrior Club board and the Saint Mary's University athletic advisory board. He is also vice president of the Morrie Miller Athletic Foundation, an organization that supports and sustains youth athletics. He is a member of the Winona Area Chamber of Commerce and Minnesota State College – Southeast Technical Alumni Association. He also serves on the Institute of Scrap Recycling Industries (ISRI) Service Corp. Board of Directors, based in Washington, DC.

Political offices
Preceded by Warren Limmer; Acting	President of the Minnesota Senate; 2019–2020	Succeeded by David Tomassoni
Preceded by David Tomassoni	President of the Minnesota Senate; 2021	Succeeded by David Tomassoni
Preceded by David Tomassoni	President of the Minnesota Senate; 2021–2022	Succeeded by David Osmek
Preceded by Bobby Joe Champion	President of the Minnesota Senate; 2025; Served alongside: Bobby Joe Champion	Succeeded by Bobby Joe Champion
Minnesota Senate
Preceded by Mark Johnson; Acting	Majority Leader of the Minnesota Senate; 2021–2023	Succeeded by Kari Dziedzic
