= Don Samuelson (Minnesota politician) =

American politician (1932–2025)

President of the Minnesota Senate
- In office January 3, 2001 – January 6, 2003
- Preceded by: Allan Spear
- Succeeded by: James Metzen

Member of the Minnesota Senate from the 13th district
- In office January 1983 – January 5, 2003
- Preceded by: David E. Rued
- Succeeded by: Dean Johnson

Minnesota State Representative
- In office January 1969 – January 1983

Personal details
- Born: August 23, 1932 Brainerd, Minnesota, U.S.
- Died: June 6, 2025 (aged 92)
- Party: Democratic-Farmer-Labor Party
- Spouse: Nancy
- Children: Steve, Chris, Paula, and Laurie
- Occupation: Bricklayer

Donald B. Samuelson (August 23, 1932 – June 6, 2025) was an American politician in Minnesota and a President of the Minnesota Senate. A bricklayer by trade, Samuelson was first elected to the Minnesota House of Representatives in 1968, where he served seven terms. In November 1982, he won election to the Minnesota Senate.

In the Senate, Samuelson served as chair of the Health and Human Services Finance subcommittee, and in 2001, he was selected to serve as the body's president.

Samuelson retired from the legislature in 2003. He died on June 6, 2025, at the age of 92.

== Sources ==
- Appearances on C-SPAN

Political offices
Preceded by Allan Spear	President of the Minnesota Senate; 2001–2003	Succeeded by James Metzen
