= David Osmek =

American politician

Dave Osmek
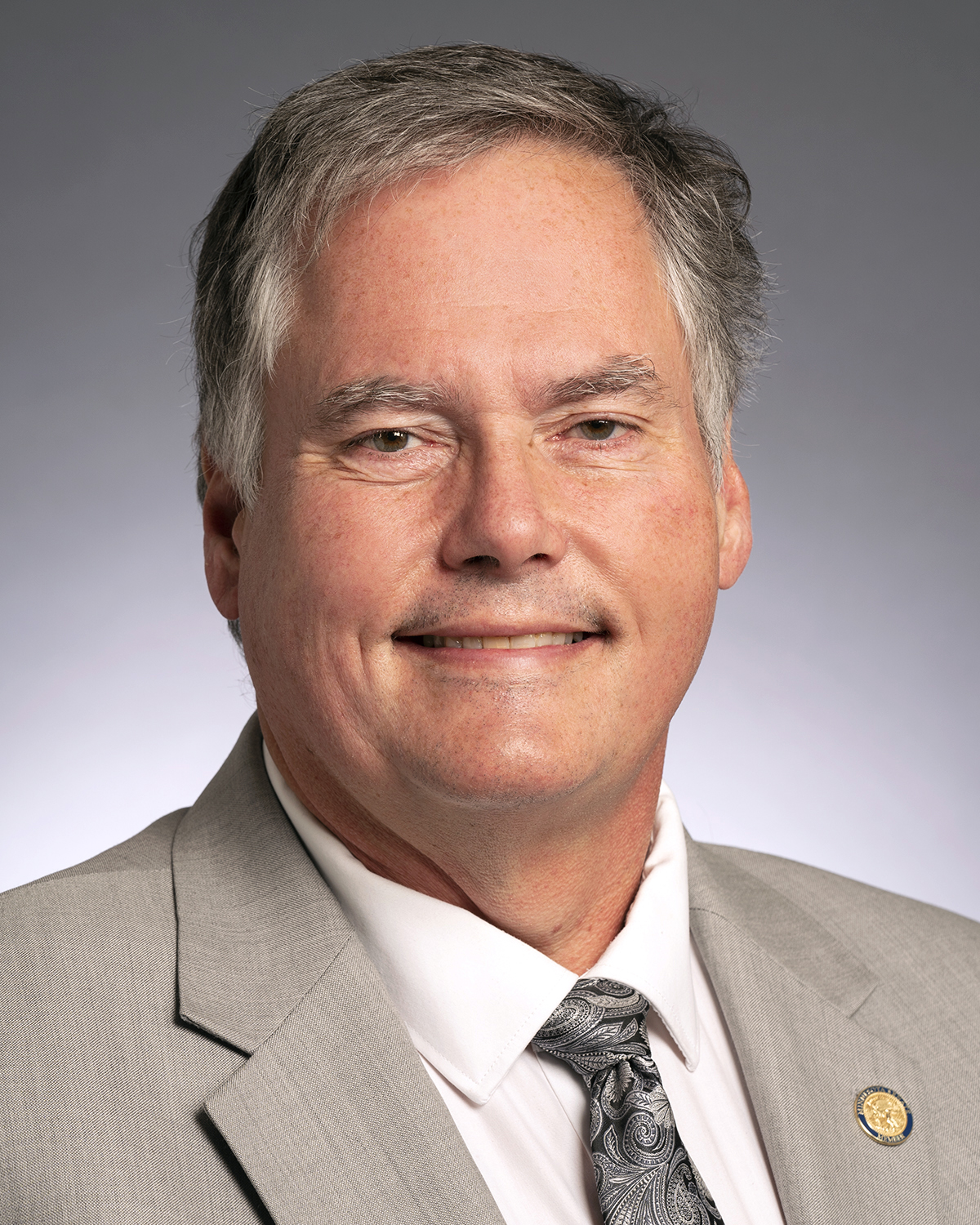
- Official portrait, 2021

President of the Minnesota Senate
- In office January 31, 2022 – January 3, 2023
- Preceded by: Jeremy Miller
- Succeeded by: Bobby Joe Champion

Member of the Minnesota Senate from the 33rd district
- In office January 8, 2013 – January 3, 2023
- Preceded by: Gen Olson
- Succeeded by: Kelly Morrison (redistricting)

Personal details
- Born: October 11, 1964 (age 61) Glencoe, Minnesota, U.S.
- Party: Republican (before 2026); Independent (2026–present)
- Spouse: Kari
- Children: 2
- Education: St. Cloud State University (BS)

David Joseph Osmek (/ˈɒzmɛk/ OZ-mek; born October 11, 1964) is an American politician and businessman who was a member of the Minnesota Senate from 2013 to 2023. From 2022 to 2023, he served as the 16th President of the Minnesota Senate. Osmek represented District 33 in the western Twin Cities metropolitan area, as a member of the Republican.

On August 22, 2017, Osmek entered the 2018 Minnesota gubernatorial election. He suspended his campaign in January 2018.

Osmek retired from the Senate in 2022. In 2026, he left the Republican Party and became an independent politician.

== Early life and education ==
Osmek was born in Glencoe, Minnesota. He attended St. Cloud State University, graduating with a B.E.S.

== Political career ==
=== Minnesota Senate ===
Osmek was first elected to the Minnesota Senate in 2012. He represented District 33 in the western Twin Cities metropolitan area, as a Republican.

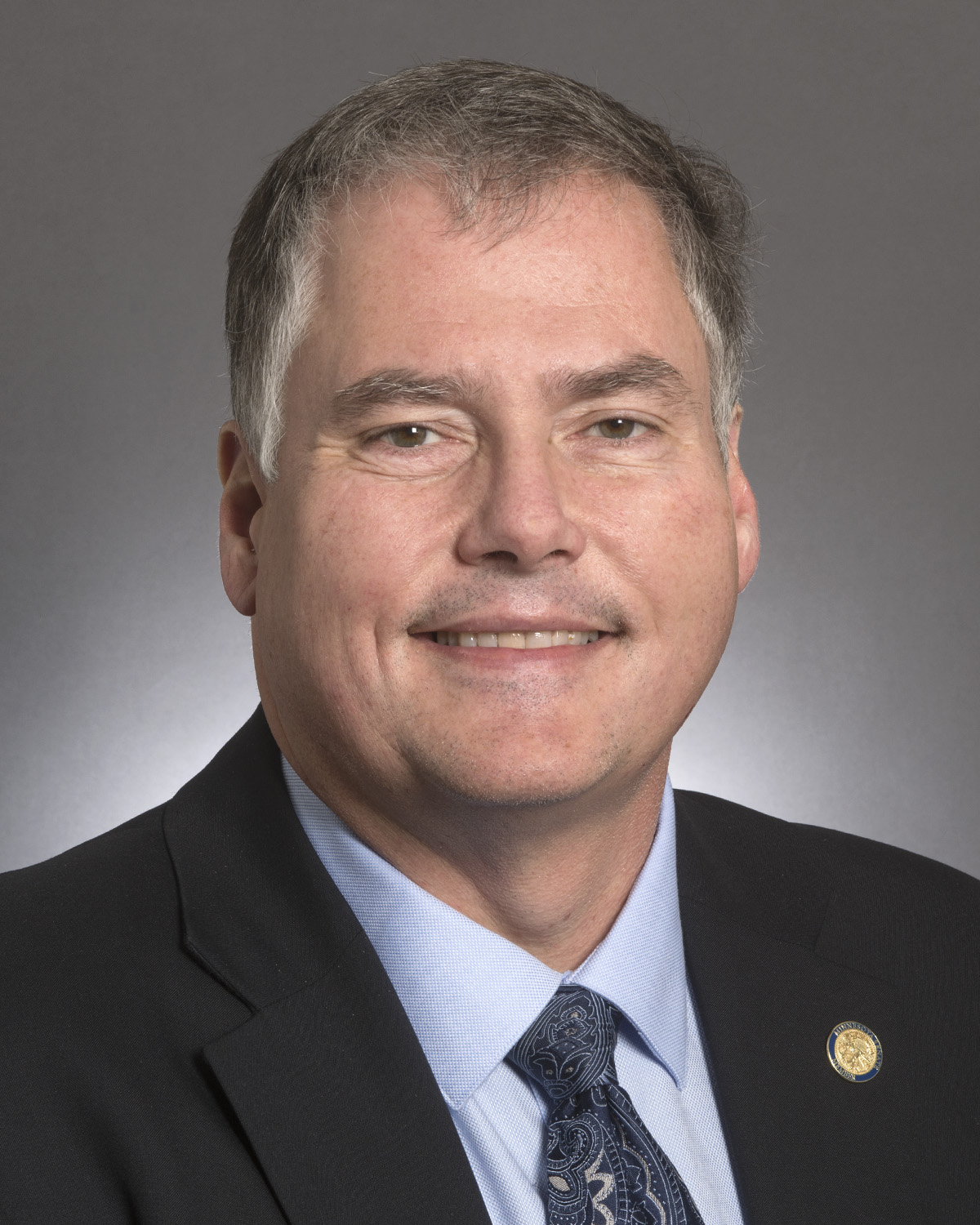
Official portrait, 2017

In 2021, amid protests for racial justice during the trial of Derek Chauvin, Osmek introduced a bill that would make people convicted of a crime at a protest ineligible for student loans and other state financial aid.

From 2022 to 2023, Osmek served as the 16th President of the Minnesota Senate. He retired from the Senate in 2022.

=== 2018 gubernatorial campaign ===
On August 22, 2017, Osmek entered the 2018 Minnesota gubernatorial election. He ran on "Minnesota values" and on a populist message that bucked the party establishment. In January 2018, Osmek suspended his campaign and supported the Republican nominee.

=== Post-state legislature ===
In 2026, Osmek announced that he was leaving the Republican Party, citing a "corrupt" state party convention.

== Personal life ==
Osmek is married to Kari. They have two children and reside in Mound, Minnesota, where Osmek served on the city council. He is a project manager.

Political offices
| Preceded by David Tomassoni; Acting | President of the Minnesota Senate; 2021–2023 | Succeeded by Bobby Joe Champion |
