= Jim Metzen =

American politician

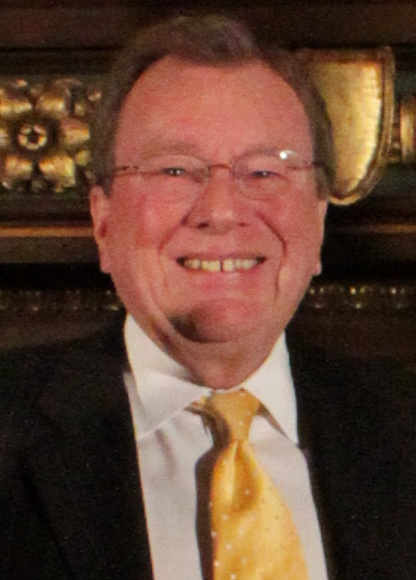
- Metzen in 2012

President of the Minnesota Senate
- In office January 7, 2003 – January 4, 2011
- Preceded by: Don Samuelson
- Succeeded by: Michelle Fischbach

Member of the Minnesota Senate from the 52nd district 39th (1987–2013)
- In office January 6, 1987 – July 11, 2016
- Preceded by: Conrado Vega
- Succeeded by: Matt Klein

Member of the Minnesota House of Representatives from the 39B district 52A (1975–1983)
- In office January 7, 1975 – January 5, 1987
- Preceded by: Ray Pavlak
- Succeeded by: Bob Milbert

Personal details
- Born: October 26, 1943 South St. Paul, Minnesota, U.S.
- Died: July 11, 2016 (aged 72) South St. Paul, Minnesota, U.S.
- Party: Minnesota Democratic–Farmer–Labor Party
- Education: University of Minnesota
- Occupation: retired banker, retired businessman, legislator

James P. Metzen (October 26, 1943 – July 11, 2016) was an American politician and member of the Minnesota Senate. A member of the Minnesota Democratic–Farmer–Labor Party (DFL), he represented District 52, which included portions of Dakota County in the southeastern Twin Cities metropolitan area.

== Early career ==
Metzen started in the banking business at Southview Bank, working his way up the chain of command until he sold his interest in the bank in 1992. He is a former Vice President of Community Affairs at Key Community Bank, which has branches in Inver Grove Heights and South St. Paul. Metzen was integral in the bank's initial startup. His father, Butch, was a union organizer and one-time Dakota County Commissioner.

== Minnesota Legislature ==
Prior to his election to the Senate, Metzen served in the Minnesota House of Representatives from 1975 to 1986, representing the old District 52A before the 1982 legislative redistricting and District 39B thereafter. He was also a member of the South St. Paul City Council from 1967 to 1974.

Metzen was first elected to the Senate in 1986 after serving 12 years in the Minnesota House of Representatives. He was President of the Minnesota Senate from 2003 to 2011. He was chair of the Senate Business, Industry and Jobs Committee from 2007 to 2011, chair of the Senate Telecommunications, Energy and Utilities Committee from 2001 to 2003, chair of the Senate Governmental Operations and Veterans Committee from 1995 to 2001, chair of the Senate Governmental Operations and Reform Committee from 1993 to 1995, and chair of the Senate Economic Development and Housing Committee from 1991 to 1993. He has also chaired multiple subcommittees. Lastly, he chaired the Senate Commerce Committee while also serving as a member of the Senate Rules and Administration, Capital Investment, and State Department and Veterans Division Committees.

== Personal life ==
Metzen resided in South St. Paul with his wife, Sandie. His brother, David, is a former University of Minnesota hockey standout, and a former regent of the University of Minnesota. David's wife, Leslie, is a former district court judge in Dakota County. Metzen has two children Jeff and John. He also has two grandchildren, Nicolas and Allyson.

On the morning of May 22, 2007, Metzen was arrested for driving under the influence just hours after the 2007 legislative session came to an end. The arrest occurred less than a mile away from his home. During a field sobriety test, he blew a 0.15, which is nearly twice the Minnesota legal limit of 0.08. He wrote a letter of apology for the incident to Senate Majority Leader Larry Pogemiller and his peers. On June 14, 2007, he was sentenced to 20 hours of community service and ordered to pay a $377 fine for the arrest.

In September 2015, Metzen was diagnosed with a recurrence of lung cancer. He began oral chemotherapy at his home shortly thereafter. On July 11, 2016, Metzen died of cancer.

Political offices
Preceded by Don Samuelson	President of the Minnesota Senate; 2003–2011	Succeeded by Michelle Fischbach
Minnesota Senate
Preceded by Conrado Vega	Senator from the 52nd district 39th (1987–2013); 1987–2016	Succeeded by TBD
Minnesota House of Representatives
Preceded by Ray Pavlak	Member from the 39B district 52A (1975–1983); 1975–1987	Succeeded by Bob Milbert
