= John T. Davies (politician) =

American journalist and politician (born 1932)

President of the Minnesota Senate
- In office 1981–1983
- Preceded by: Edward J. Gearty
- Succeeded by: Jerome M. Hughes

Member of the Minnesota Court of Appeals
- In office July 1, 1990 – September 1, 2000
- Appointed by: Rudy Perpich

Minnesota State Senator
- In office January 1959 – January 1983

Personal details
- Born: January 6, 1932 (age 94) Harvey, North Dakota, U.S.
- Party: Democratic-Farmer-Labor Party
- Spouse(s): Janet Tripp (div.); Patricia Davies
- Children: Elizabeth, Ted Elliot, and John Thomas III
- Education: Itasca Community College; University of Minnesota
- Occupation: Journalist; Attorney

John Thomas "Jack" Davies II (born January 6, 1932) is a Minnesota DFL politician, a former legislator and jurist, former Minnesota Court of Appeals judge, and a former President of the Minnesota Senate.

Davies served as a sports editor for KSTP-TV, and later earned a law degree from the University of Minnesota, eventually working as a professor at William Mitchell College of Law. Davies was first elected to the Minnesota Senate in 1959, and served until 1983. While in office, he served as chair of the judiciary committee, and as President of the Senate during his last term. In 1990, Davies was appointed to the Minnesota Court of Appeals by Gov. Rudy Perpich, a position he held until he retired in 2000.

Political offices
Preceded by Edward J. Gearty	President of the Minnesota Senate; 1981–1983	Succeeded by Jerome M. Hughes
