= Augustine Dominguez =

American politician

Augustine "Willie" Dominguez

Member of the Minnesota House of Representatives from the 58B district
- In office 2007–2009
- Preceded by: Keith Ellison
- Succeeded by: Bobby Joe Champion

Personal details
- Born: July 30, 1955 (age 71) Minneapolis, Minnesota
- Party: Democratic Farmer Labor Party
- Spouse: Juanita
- Education: Hennepin Technical College
- Profession: consultant, radio show host

Augustine "Willie" Dominguez (born July 30, 1955) is a Democrat, and a former member of the Minnesota House of Representatives. He represented District 58B, which includes portions of downtown and north Minneapolis, from 2007 to 2009. He lost the district DFL Party's endorsement to Bobby Joe Champion in 2008. He then opted to run in the primary election, again losing to Champion, who went on to win in the general election on November 4, 2008.

While in the House, Dominguez was a member of the Commerce and Labor Committee and the Local Government and Metropolitan Affairs Committee. He also served on the Agriculture, Rural Economies and Veterans Affairs Subcommittee for the Veterans Affairs Division, on the Finance subcommittees for the K-12 Finance Division, the K-12 Finance Division-Disparities in Student Support and Service (which he chaired), and the Public Safety Finance Division.

Dominguez attended Minneapolis North High School and Hennepin Technical College. He is a nonprofit management consultant, and also has a Saturday morning radio show on KFAI Radio.
