= Bob Pavlak =

American politician

Member of the Minnesota House of Representatives from the 43A District
- In office 3 January 1967 – 31 December 1972

Member of the Minnesota House of Representatives from the 67A District
- In office 1 January 1973 – 5 January 1975
- In office 1 January 1979 – 18 May 1979

Personal details
- Born: 18 July 1924 Saint Paul, Minnesota
- Died: 9 October 1994 (aged 70) Saint Paul, Minnesota
- Party: Republican
- Relations: Ray Pavlak (cousin)

Robert Leo Pavlak Sr. (18 July 1924 – 9 October 1994) was an American politician, U.S. Marshall, police lieutenant, best remembered for his involvement in a 1978 election dispute. He served in the Minnesota House of Representatives from 1967–1975 and 1979 as a Republican. He was a police lieutenant in the St. Paul Police Department. He died from esophagus cancer.

== Early life ==
Robert Leo Pavlak Sr. was born in Saint Paul, Minnesota on 18 July 1924. He was raised in a Catholic orphanage in Milaca, Minnesota, after his father was killed in the line of duty during a bank robbery in 1933 and his mother died soon after. Pavlak joined the Marines and served during World War II. Once he left the Marines, he joined the St. Paul Police Department and retired from the force in 1981.

== Career ==
Pavlak was first elected state legislator for District 43A in 1967 as a Republican and served that district until 1972 when he was redistricted to District 67A. He served District 67A for one more term until 1974 when he was defeated by Arnold Kempe.

=== 1978 election dispute ===
During the 1978 election for the Minnesota House of Representatives, Pavlak attacked Arnold Kempe through his campaign for his poor attendance records during roll-call. The statistics truthfully showed that Kempe had missed 329 of 1798 roll-call votes during the previous legislative session (1977-1978). These statistics were given to the St. Paul Pioneer Press who then decided to endorse Pavlak, however, during the endorsement editorial the paper misconstrued the statistics. They published that Kempe had voted only four times out of more than 300 opportunities, which was false. The Pavlak campaign reproduced and distributed copies of the editorial and Pavlak won the election by 321 votes.

Following the election, there was months of court battles and a legislative debate started which resulted in Pavlak's ejection from the Minnesota House of Representatives. The Minnesota Supreme Court ruled in a 7-2 vote that Pavlak's mistake was "deliberate, serious and material".

=== U.S. Marshal ===
Soon after retiring from the police force, he was appointed a U.S. Marshal by President Ronald Reagan in 1981. He assisted in creating a federal program which allows the government to seize and sell property confiscated during drug arrests. He retired in 1990.
