= Bobby Joe Champion =

American politician (born 1963)

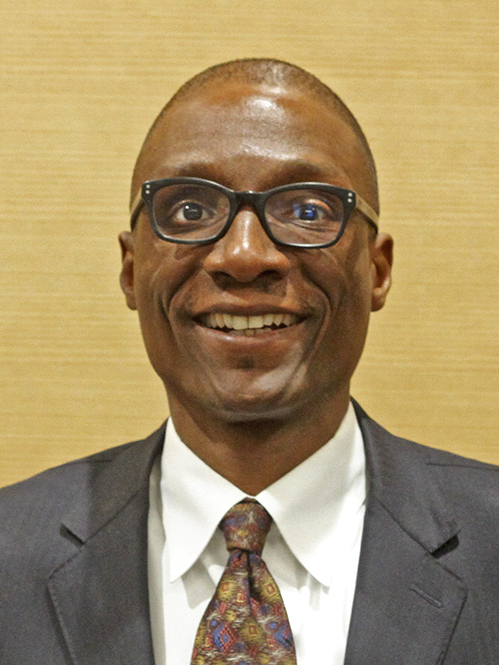
- Champion in 2016

President of the Minnesota Senate
- Incumbent
- Assumed office January 3, 2023 Serving with Jeremy Miller (January 14, 2025 – February 3, 2025)
- Preceded by: David Osmek

Member of the Minnesota Senate from the 59th district
- Incumbent
- Assumed office January 8, 2013
- Preceded by: Linda Higgins (Redistricting)

Member of the Minnesota House of Representatives from the 58B district
- In office January 6, 2009 – January 8, 2013
- Preceded by: Augustine Dominguez
- Succeeded by: Raymond Dehn (Redistricting)

Personal details
- Born: December 17, 1963 (age 62) Minneapolis, Minnesota, U.S.
- Party: Democratic
- Spouse: Angela
- Children: 3
- Education: Macalester College (BA); William Mitchell College of Law (JD)

Bobby Joe Champion (born December 17, 1963) is an American lawyer and politician serving as a member of the Minnesota Senate. A member of the Minnesota Democratic–Farmer–Labor Party (DFL), he represents the 59th district, which includes portions of downtown and north Minneapolis in Hennepin County. He is the president of the Minnesota Senate.

== Early life and education ==
Champion was born in Minneapolis and graduated from Minneapolis North High School. He earned a Bachelor of Arts degree in political science from Macalester College and a Juris Doctor from the William Mitchell College of Law.

== Career ==
Champion worked as an assistant Minnesota attorney general under Skip Humphrey and Mike Hatch, and as an attorney for a legal rights center. He also worked with Flyte Tyme Productions and co-founded and directed the Grammy-nominated Excelsior Choir. He was executive director of the Midwest chapter of the National Association of Minority Contractors and program director for Social Spaces with Stairstep Initiative.

In the 2023 legislative session, Champion pushed for changes to Minnesota's juvenile probation program.

On January 27, 2026, Champion was struck by liquid sprayed by a man at a Ilhan Omar townhall event.

=== Minnesota House of Representatives ===
Champion was elected to the House in 2008, unseating first-term incumbent Augustine Dominguez. He was reelected in 2010.

=== Minnesota Senate ===
In 2012, Champion was elected to the Minnesota Senate, defeating Republican Jim Lilly, 82%–18%. He was reelected to the Senate in 2016, defeating challenger Jennifer Carnahan. Champion was also reelected in 2020 and 2022. In 2022, he was chosen to serve as president of the Senate by his caucus. He is the first African-American to hold this position. Champion also chairs the Committee on Jobs and Economic Development.

== Awards ==
In 2023, Champion received the Joan Growe Award at the Humphrey-Mondale Awards.

Political offices
Preceded by David Osmek	President of the Minnesota Senate; 2023–present Served alongside: Jeremy Miller (2025)	Incumbent
