= Edward J. Gearty =

American politician

Ed Gearty

President of the Minnesota Senate
- In office 1977–1981
- Preceded by: Alec G. Olson
- Succeeded by: John T. Davies

Minnesota State Senator
- In office January 1971 – January 1981

Member of the Minnesota House of Representatives from the 39th District
- In office January 1963 – January 1971

Commissioner on the Minneapolis Park and Recreation Board
- In office July 1959 – January 1963

Personal details
- Born: March 17, 1923 Minneapolis, Minnesota, U.S.
- Died: September 25, 2009 (aged 86) Minneapolis, Minnesota, U.S.
- Party: Democratic-Farmer-Labor Party
- Spouse: Lorraine Breher
- Children: Annie
- Education: College of St. Thomas; Georgetown University
- Occupation: Attorney

Edward J. "Ed" Gearty (March 17, 1923 – September 25, 2009) was a Minnesota DFL politician, a former legislator, and a former President of the Minnesota Senate.

Gearty was elected to the Minneapolis Park and Recreation Board from 1959 to 1963 and served as board president from 1960 to 1963. After leaving his Park Board commissioner role, he was appointed attorney for the board, and served through the remainder of the 1960s. Gearty was known for crafting a stance against the taking of parkland for transportation projects during the urban renewal period, which contributed to a landmark environmental US Supreme Court ruling Citizens to Preserve Overton Park v. Volpe. He took office in the Minnesota House of Representatives in 1963. He served four terms in the House before winning election to the Senate in 1970. While in the Senate, Gearty served as chair of the Governmental Operations and Elections committees. He was elected President of the Senate in 1977 and served in that role until his retirement in 1981.

In the Minnesota state legislature, Gearty was "known for his fairness and open-mindedness" and "was the most universally loved guy in either body."

In private life, Gearty worked as an attorney in private practice. He was married, and had one daughter. He died in 2009.

Political offices
Preceded by Alec G. Olson	President of the Minnesota Senate; 1977–1981	Succeeded by John T. Davies
