= Florian Chmielewski =

American politician (1927–2024)

President of the Minnesota Senate
- In office 1987
- Preceded by: Jerome M. Hughes
- Succeeded by: Jerome M. Hughes

Member of the Minnesota Senate from the 8th district
- In office January 5, 1993 – January 6, 1997
- Preceded by: Jim Gustafson
- Succeeded by: Becky Lourey

Personal details
- Born: February 10, 1927 Sturgeon Lake, Minnesota, U.S.
- Died: April 23, 2024 (aged 97) Sturgeon Lake, Minnesota, U.S.
- Party: Democratic-Farmer-Labor Party
- Spouse: Patricia Stolquist (m. 1956; died 2003)
- Children: 4
- Education: University of Minnesota
- Occupation: Television Executive; Musician; Politician

Florian W. Chmielewski Sr. (February 10, 1927 – April 23, 2024) was an American musician and politician. He played as an accordion player with the Chmielewski Family Funtime Band, performing polka music throughout the midwest.

Chmielewski was elected to the Senate in 1970, becoming chair of the employment committee in 1981. During a special session in 1987, Chmielewski was elected to serve as president, due to the absence of State Senator Jerome M. Hughes, who both preceded and succeeded Chmielewski in the position. In 1996, Chmielewski was placed on probation after pleading guilty to a gross misdemeanor for providing family members state long-distance access codes, allowing them to make phone calls at state expense.

Chmielewski appeared on the weekly television show, Chmielewski Funtime, for over 35 years. He continued performing with his band until his death on April 23, 2024, at the age of 97.

Political offices
Preceded by Jerome M. Hughes	President of the Minnesota Senate; 1987	Succeeded by Jerome M. Hughes
