= Sharon Erickson Ropes =

American politician

Member of the Minnesota Senate from the 31st district
- In office January 3, 2007 – January 4, 2011
- Preceded by: Bob Kierlin
- Succeeded by: Jeremy Miller

Personal details
- Born: January 23, 1954 (age 72) Two Harbors, Minnesota
- Party: Minnesota Democratic-Farmer-Labor Party
- Spouse: Milton
- Children: 3
- Education: College of Saint Teresa
- Occupation: Registered nurse, legislator, veteran

Sharon L. Erickson Ropes (born January 23, 1954) is a Minnesota politician and a former member of the Minnesota Senate who represented District 31, which includes portions of Fillmore, Houston, and Winona counties in the southeastern part of the state. A Democrat, she was first elected to the Senate in 2006. She was subsequently unseated by Republican Jeremy Miller in the 2010 general election.

Erickson Ropes was a member and vice chair of the Senate's Agriculture and Veterans Committee. She served on the Health, Housing and Family Security Committee, and on the Higher Education Committee. She also served on the Finance subcommittees for the Agriculture and Veterans Budget and Policy Division (serving as vice chair), the Health and Human Services Budget Division, and the Higher Education Budget and Policy Division. Her special legislative concerns included health care, education, and the environment.

Erickson Ropes is a registered nurse by profession. She was born in Two Harbors and graduated from Two Harbors High School in 1972. She went on to the College of Saint Teresa in Winona, where she received a B.A. in French and a B.S. in Nursing in 1976. She then served as a commissioned officer in the United States Navy Nurse Corps in North Carolina and Virginia from 1977 to 1982.

Erickson Ropes has served on various government and community boards and organizations. She was a member of the Minnesota Attorney General's Task Force on Consumer Rights and Health Care. She was a member of the Winona School Board, serving as chair from 2000 to 2001, and a member and former president of the board of directors of the Minnesota State Parent-Teacher Association. She is a member of the state advisory board of Minnesota Master Gardeners.
