= Jerome M. Hughes =

American politician (1929–2015)

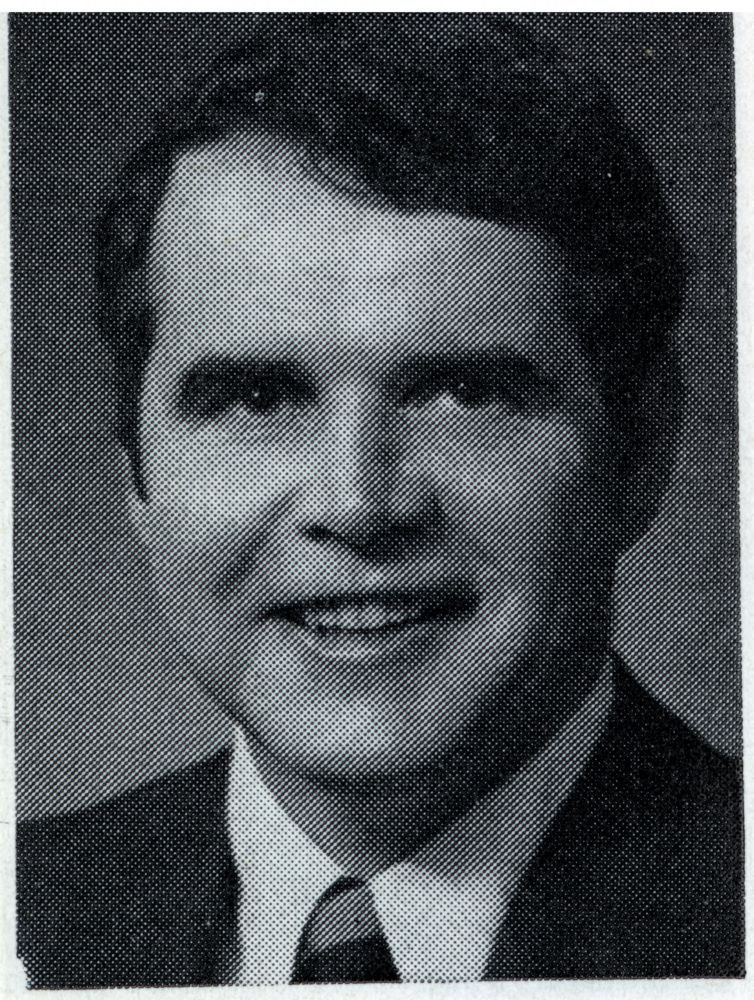
- Hughes in 1973

President of the Minnesota Senate
- In office 1987–1993
- Preceded by: Florian Chmielewski
- Succeeded by: Allan Spear

President of the Minnesota Senate
- In office 1983–1987
- Preceded by: John T. Davies
- Succeeded by: Florian Chmielewski

Minnesota State Senator
- In office January 1967 – January 1993

Personal details
- Born: October 1, 1929
- Died: June 26, 2015 (aged 85) Maplewood, Minnesota, U.S.
- Party: Democratic-Farmer-Labor Party
- Spouse: Audrey Lackner
- Children: Bernardine, Timothy, Kathleen, Rose Marie, Margaret, and John
- Education: St. Thomas College; University of Minnesota; Wayne State University
- Occupation: Educational Researcher

Jerome M. Hughes (October 1, 1929 – June 26, 2015) was an American educator and politician.

== Background ==
Hughes graduated from Cretin High School. He then received his bachelor's degree from University of St. Thomas, his master's degree from University of Minnesota, and his doctorate from Wayne State University. Hughes taught in high school and was a coach. He was a community educator administrator and public policy consultant with the St. Paul School District. He also taught at the University of Minnesota.

== Political career ==
From Maplewood, Minnesota, Hughes was elected to the Senate in 1966, and served for 26 years in the body. He became chair of the education committee in 1973, and was elected President of the Senate in 1983, a position he would hold—save for during a special session in 1987—for the remainder of his time in office. Hughes was a Democrat. Hughes retired from the Senate in 1993.

Political offices
Preceded by Florian Chmielewski	President of the Minnesota Senate; 1987–1993	Succeeded by Allan Spear
Preceded by John T. Davies	President of the Minnesota Senate; 1983–1987	Succeeded by Florian Chmielewski
