= Metropolitan Organizing Strategy Enabling Strength =

Interfaith group based in Michigan, U.S.

Metropolitan Organizing Strategy Enabling Strength (MOSES) is an interfaith group based in Detroit, Michigan, United States.

MOSES was founded in 1997. As of 2002, 130 congregations were participating in it.

MOSES notably campaigned for improvements to public transportation. It issued a lawsuit against the Detroit Department of Transportation in 2005 in protest against the lack of lifts for wheelchair users to access buses.

Other subjects on which it has campaigned include healthcare, civil rights of immigrants, retail quality and public safety. From 2001 it campaigned for land banks to take control of abandoned property, leading to the establishment of the Detroit land bank authority in 2008.

MOSES is currently based in the Michigan Building in Downtown Detroit.
