= Ray Pavlak =

American judge and politician

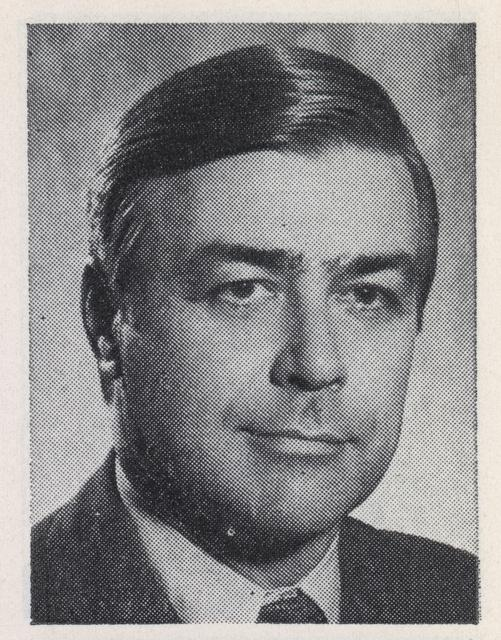
- Pavlak c. 1973

Judge of the First Judicial District of Minnesota
- In office August 1, 1974 – February 28, 1994

Member of the Minnesota House of Representatives from the 13th and 12A Districts
- In office January 6, 1969 – August 1, 1974
- Governor: Harold LeVander; Wendell R. Anderson; Rudy Perpich

Personal details
- Born: March 6, 1926 Ryder, North Dakota, U.S.
- Died: April 1, 1994 (aged 68) South St. Paul, Minnesota, U.S.
- Resting place: Resurrection Cemetery, Mendota Heights, Minnesota, U.S.
- Other political affiliations: Minnesota Democratic–Farmer–Labor Party
- Spouse: Jeroline Schloesser (m. 1955)
- Relations: Bob Pavlak (cousin)
- Children: 5
- Education: University of St. Thomas; William Mitchell College of Law

Military service
- Allegiance: United States
- Branch/service: United States Navy
- Battles/wars: World War II

Raymond L. Pavlak (March 6, 1926 – April 1, 1994) was an American judge and politician.

From South St. Paul, Minnesota, Pavlak graduated from South St. Paul High School. He served in the United States Navy during World War II. Pavlak graduated from the University of St. Thomas and received his law degree from William Mitchell College of Law. He then practiced law. From 1965 until 1974, Pavlak served in the Minnesota House of Representatives and was a Democrat. In 1974, Pavlak was appointed Minnesota District Court judge and served until his retirement in 1994. Pavlak died at his home in South St. Paul. Minnesota.
