= Allan Spear =

American politician (1937–2008)

President of the Minnesota Senate
- In office January 1993 – January 2001
- Preceded by: Jerome M. Hughes
- Succeeded by: Don Samuelson

Member of the Minnesota Senate
- In office January 1973 – January 2001
- Succeeded by: Myron Orfield
- Constituency: 57th district (1973–1983); 59th district (1983–1993); 60th district (1993–2001)

Personal details
- Born: Allan Henry Spear; June 24, 1937 Michigan City, Indiana, U.S.
- Died: October 11, 2008 (aged 71) Minneapolis, Minnesota, U.S.
- Party: Democratic
- Spouse: Junjiro Tsuji
- Education: Oberlin College (BA); Yale University (MA, PhD)

Allan Henry Spear (June 24, 1937 – October 11, 2008) was an American politician and educator from Minnesota who served almost thirty years in the Minnesota Senate, including nearly a decade as President of the Senate.

== Biography ==
Spear was born to a Jewish family in Michigan City, Indiana. A graduate of Oberlin College (B.A., 1958), he went on to earn an M.A. and a PhD from Yale University (1960 and 1965 respectively). Decades later, Oberlin would also award him an honorary LL.D. He was first elected to the Minnesota Senate in 1972, representing a liberal Minneapolis district centered on the University of Minnesota. He served a total of 28 years in the Senate, retiring in 2000. He was President of the Senate from 1992 to 2000.

Spear represented two different districts in Minneapolis during his political career. From 1972 to 1982, he represented District 57, the southeast part of Minneapolis, including the University of Minnesota's main campus. In 1982, he moved to District 59, the southwest part of Minneapolis, (renamed to District 60 after the 1992 redistricting) winning election and representing the district until his retirement in 2000.

Spear came out on December 9, 1974, and was one of the first openly gay Americans serving in elected office. His coming out drew national attention, being featured in The New York Times and elsewhere.

=== 1990s and later ===
Spear was instrumental in passing the 1993 Minnesota Human Rights Act, which guaranteed protection from discrimination in education, employment, and housing to LGBT Minnesotans. He had been working on this for nearly 20 years, and later called it his "proudest legislative achievement." His personal connections with other senators during his years in office were important in gaining the votes of Republican colleagues. He gained the public support of the leader of the Senate Republicans, Lutheran minister Dean E. Johnson, who gave a speech supporting the bill on the Senate floor (and was later "censured" by his local Republican party officials, and eventually forced out of the Republican party).

In 2008, as part of Minnesota's Sesquicentennial celebration, the Minnesota Historical Society named him as one of the 150 people and groups that helped shape the state. Allan Spear died on October 11, 2008, from complications following heart surgery earlier that week. He was survived by his partner of 26 years, Junjiro Tsuji, who died on March 13, 2019.

He had partially completed an autobiography (Crossing the Barriers ISBN 9780816670406) at his death; a colleague of his in the Senate, John Watson Milton, provided an afterword listing the accomplishments of his later years. This book was published in 2010.

Political offices
Preceded by Jerome M. Hughes	President of the Minnesota Senate; 1993–2001	Succeeded by Don Samuelson
