= List of presidents of the Minnesota Senate =

President of the Minnesota Senate

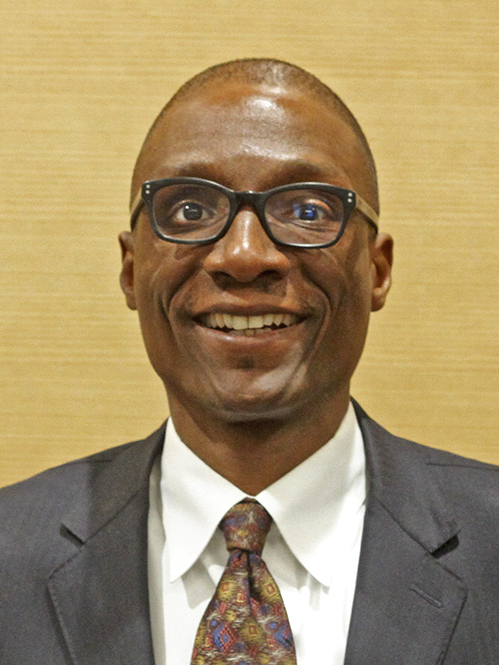
- Incumbent; Bobby Joe Champion since January 14, 2025
- Term length: Two years, no term limit
- Inaugural holder: Alec G. Olson
- Formation: January 1973
- Succession: Second
- Website: http://www.senate.leg.state.mn.us/

The president of the Minnesota Senate is the presiding officer of the Minnesota Senate. Until 1973, the lieutenant governor served as the Senate president. Since then, presidents have been elected by the body, usually at the nomination of the majority.

While power within the Senate lies primarily with the majority leader, the president of the Senate does succeed to lieutenant governor in the event that office becomes vacant, something which happened most recently in 2018.

== 1858–1973 ==
From statehood until 1973, the lieutenant governor served as president. Not all lieutenant governors served at the same time as the Senate was in session.

No.	Name	Took office	Left office	Party
1	William Holcombe	1858	1860	Democratic
2	Ignatius L. Donnelly	1860	1863	Republican
3	Charles D. Sherwood	1864	1866	Republican
4	Thomas H. Armstrong	1866	1870	Republican
5	William H. Yale	1870	1874	Republican
6	Alphonso Barto	1874	1876	Republican
7	James Wakefield	1876	1880	Republican
8	Charles A. Gilman	1880	1887	Republican
9	Albert E. Rice	1887	1891	Republican
10	Gideon S. Ives	1891	1893	Republican
11	David Marston Clough	1893	1895	Republican
12	Frank A. Day	1895	1897	Republican
13	John L. Gibbs	1897	1899	Republican
14	Lyndon Ambrose Smith	1899	1903	Republican
15	Ray W. Jones	1903	1907	Republican
16	Adolph Olson Eberhart	1907	1909	Republican
17	Edward Everett Smith	1909	1911	Republican
18	Samuel Y. Gordon	1911	1913	Republican
19	Joseph A. A. Burnquist	1913	1915	Republican
20	George H. Sullivan	1916	1917	Republican
21	Thomas Frankson	1917	1921	Republican
22	Louis L. Collins	1921	1925	Republican
23	William I. Nolan	1925	1929	Republican
24	Charles Edward Adams	1929	1931	Republican
25	Henry M. Arens	1931	1933	Farmer–Labor
26	Konrad K. Solberg	1933	1935	Farmer–Labor
27	Hjalmar Petersen	1935	1936	Farmer–Labor
28	Gottfrid Lindsten	1937	1939	Farmer–Labor
29	C. Elmer Anderson	1939	1943	Republican
30	Edward John Thye	1943	1943	Republican
31	Archie H. Miller	1943	1945	Republican
32	C. Elmer Anderson	1945	1951	Republican
33	Ancher Nelsen	1953	1953	Republican
34	Karl Rolvaag	1955	1963	Democratic–Farmer–Labor
35	Alexander M. Keith	1963	1967	Democratic–Farmer–Labor
36	James B. Goetz	1967	1971	Republican
37	Rudy Perpich	1971	1973	Democratic–Farmer–Labor

== Since 1973 ==
Beginning in 1973, the Minnesota Senate began electing its own presidents.

No.	Image	Name	Took office	Left office	Party
38		Alec G. Olson	1973	1976	Democratic–Farmer–Labor
39		Edward J. Gearty	1977	1981	Democratic–Farmer–Labor
40		John T. Davies	1981	1983	Democratic–Farmer–Labor
41		Jerome M. Hughes	1983	1987	Democratic–Farmer–Labor
42		Florian Chmielewski	1987	1987	Democratic–Farmer–Labor
43		Jerome M. Hughes	1987	1993	Democratic–Farmer–Labor
44		Allan H. Spear	1993	2001	Democratic–Farmer–Labor
45		Don Samuelson	January 3, 2001	January 6, 2003	Democratic–Farmer–Labor
46		Jim Metzen	January 7, 2003	January 4, 2011	Democratic–Farmer–Labor
47		Michelle Fischbach	January 4, 2011	January 7, 2013	Republican
48		Sandy Pappas	January 8, 2013	January 2, 2017	Democratic–Farmer–Labor
49		Michelle Fischbach	January 3, 2017	May 25, 2018^{1}	Republican
50		Jeremy Miller	January 7, 2019	November 12, 2020	Republican
51		David Tomassoni	November 12, 2020	January 7, 2021	Independent
52		Jeremy Miller	September 9, 2021	January 31, 2022	Republican
53		David Osmek	January 31, 2022	January 3, 2023	Republican
54		Bobby Joe Champion	January 3, 2023	Incumbent	Democratic–Farmer–Labor
54		Jeremy Miller	January 14, 2025^{2}	February 3, 2025	Republican

^{1}In accordance with the Minnesota Constitution, Fischbach automatically became Lieutenant Governor of Minnesota on January 3, 2018, after previous Lt. Gov. Tina Smith resigned to accept an appointment to the United States Senate. Fischbach formally resigned from the Minnesota Senate on May 25, 2018. As the Senate did not meet during this time, the position was vacant until Jeremy Miller was formally elected in January 2019.
^{2}After the death of Sen. Kari Dziedzic, the Minnesota Senate was evenly split between the DFL and Republican parties. Under a power-sharing agreement, Miller served as co-president until the election of Sen. Doron Clark restored the DFL majority.
