= Minnesota State College Southeast =

Technical and community college in Minnesota, U.S.

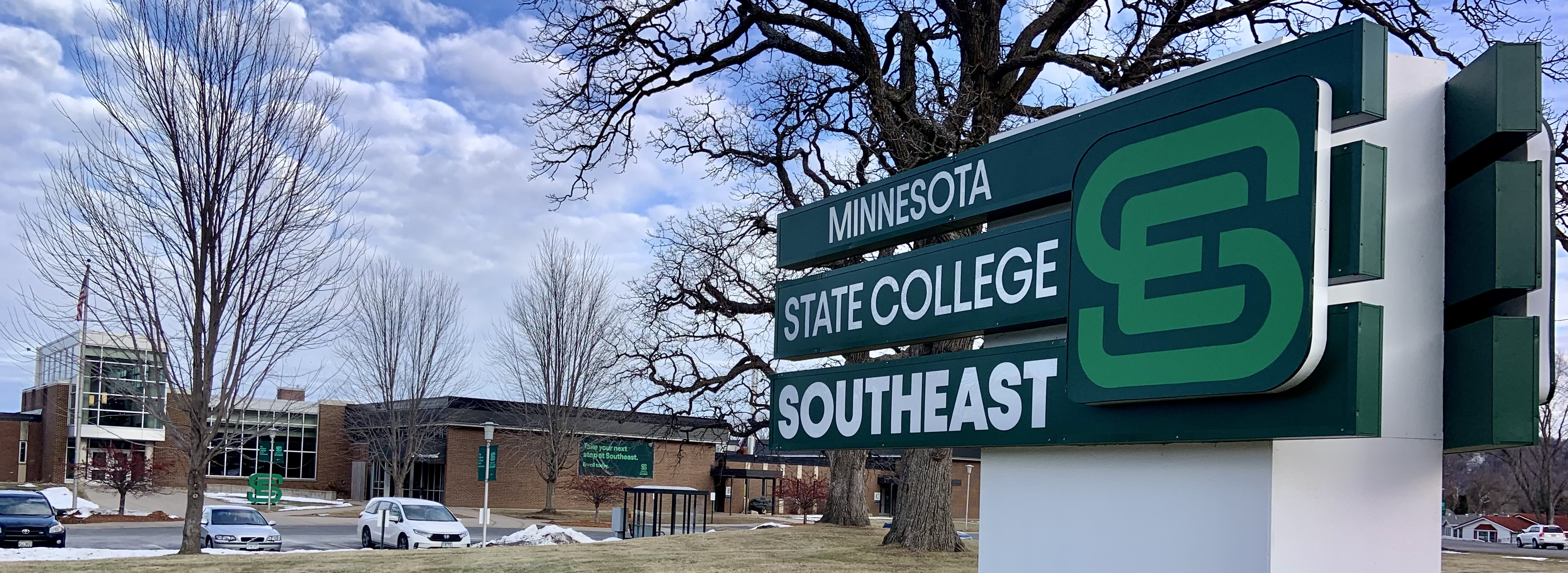
Minnesota State College Southeast

Minnesota State College Southeast is a public technical and community college with two campuses in Minnesota, one in Red Wing and another in Winona. The two campuses were originally two separate vocational institutes. The college is part of the Minnesota State Colleges and Universities system. The Red Wing campus is nationally renowned for its string instrument and woodwind and brass instrument repair programs. There are only a few colleges in the nation which offer these programs. The United States Marine Corps and US Navy send their band instrument repair techs to the school.

The Winona campus was founded in 1949 as the Winona Area Vocational-Technical School. The current campus was opened in Winona in 1967. In 1971, the Red Wing Area Vocational-Technical Institute, was founded, opening doors to its new campus in 1973. The colleges merged under the Minnesota Technical College System in 1992.

In 2016, the college was granted a mission change to become a community and technical college, offering the associate of arts degree as well as technical programs. At that time the college changed its name to Minnesota State College Southeast.

Minnesota State College Southeast is accredited by the Higher Learning Commission.
