= Kathryn Jeffery =

American community college administrator

Superintendent/President of Santa Monica College
- Incumbent
- Assumed office February 8, 2016

President of Sacramento City College
- In office 2008 – February 4, 2016

President of Hennepin Technical College
- In office July 24, 2006 – 2008

Personal details
- Born: Kathryn Elaine Jeffery
- Education: Oklahoma State University (BMusEd, MS); University of Texas at Austin (PhD)
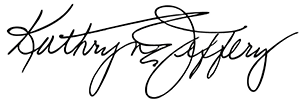
- Signature
- Scientific career
- Fields: Educational administration
- Institutions: Sacramento City College; Hennepin Technical College; College of Southern Nevada; Columbia College; California Community Colleges; Santa Monica College
- Thesis: The role of community colleges in welfare reform and the training needs of welfare recipients: Community colleges in California (1999)
- Doctoral advisor: William Moore Jr.

Kathryn Elaine Jeffery is an American academic administrator who has been serving as superintendent/president of Santa Monica College in California since February 2016.

== Education ==
Jeffery received a Bachelor of Music Education (with a major in piano and a minor in voice) and a Master of Science in applied behavioral studies in education (counseling) from Oklahoma State University.

She received a Doctor of Philosophy in educational administration (with an emphasis in community college leadership) from the University of Texas at Austin. Her doctoral dissertation was titled The role of community colleges in welfare reform and the training needs of welfare recipients: Community colleges in California (1999). Her doctoral advisor was William Moore Jr.

== Career ==
Jeffery began her career in higher education as a counselor and instructor. At Sacramento City College, she held a full-time faculty position in the counseling department and taught courses as an adjunct instructor in the humanities and fine arts division. She later taught graduate courses in educational leadership at California State University, Stanislaus, the University of Nevada, Las Vegas, and Drexel University.

Her early administrative positions included serving as coordinator of the Extended Opportunity Programs and Services program at Sacramento City College. She subsequently worked in the California Community Colleges Chancellor's Office as dean of student services and as coordinator of faculty and staff diversity. She later became vice president of Columbia College in the Yosemite Community College District.

In 2004, Jeffery became chief campus administrator of the Charleston campus of the Community College of Southern Nevada; she also served as the community college's interim dean of arts and letters.

On March 22, 2006, the Minnesota State Colleges and Universities Board of Trustees appointed her president of Hennepin Technical College. She took office on July 24, 2006, overseeing the college's campuses in Brooklyn Park and Eden Prairie, Minnesota.

In 2008, Jeffery returned to Sacramento City College as its president, serving for nearly eight years until February 2016. During this period, the college participated in the development of West Sacramento Early College Preparatory Charter School, including curriculum planning and opportunities for its students to take college courses. She remained president until February 4, 2016, as she left to become superintendent and president of Santa Monica College.

=== Santa Monica Community College ===
The Santa Monica Community College District Board of Trustees voted unanimously on November 17, 2015, to appoint Jeffery superintendent and president of Santa Monica College. She succeeded Chui L. Tsang, with Jeffery Shimizu serving as interim president between Tsang's retirement and Jeffery's arrival. Jeffery began her presidency on February 8, 2016.

During Jeffery's tenure, Santa Monica College opened its Center for Media and Design and the associated KCRW Media Center in December 2017. The college also broke ground on its first Malibu campus in 2018; the campus began serving students in February 2023.

In 2023, Jeffery said that the college's enrollment had fallen by approximately 16 percent during the pandemic and that the administration was pursuing dual-enrollment partnerships, high-school outreach, and career-education recruitment as part of its recovery efforts.

On September 3, 2025, Jeffery announced that she intended to retire as superintendent and president effective December 31, 2026. She said that the advance notice was intended to give the board time to conduct a search and arrange a transition.

== See also ==
- List of women presidents or chancellors of co-ed colleges and universities
