= Corsair Field =

Stadium in Santa Monica, California, US

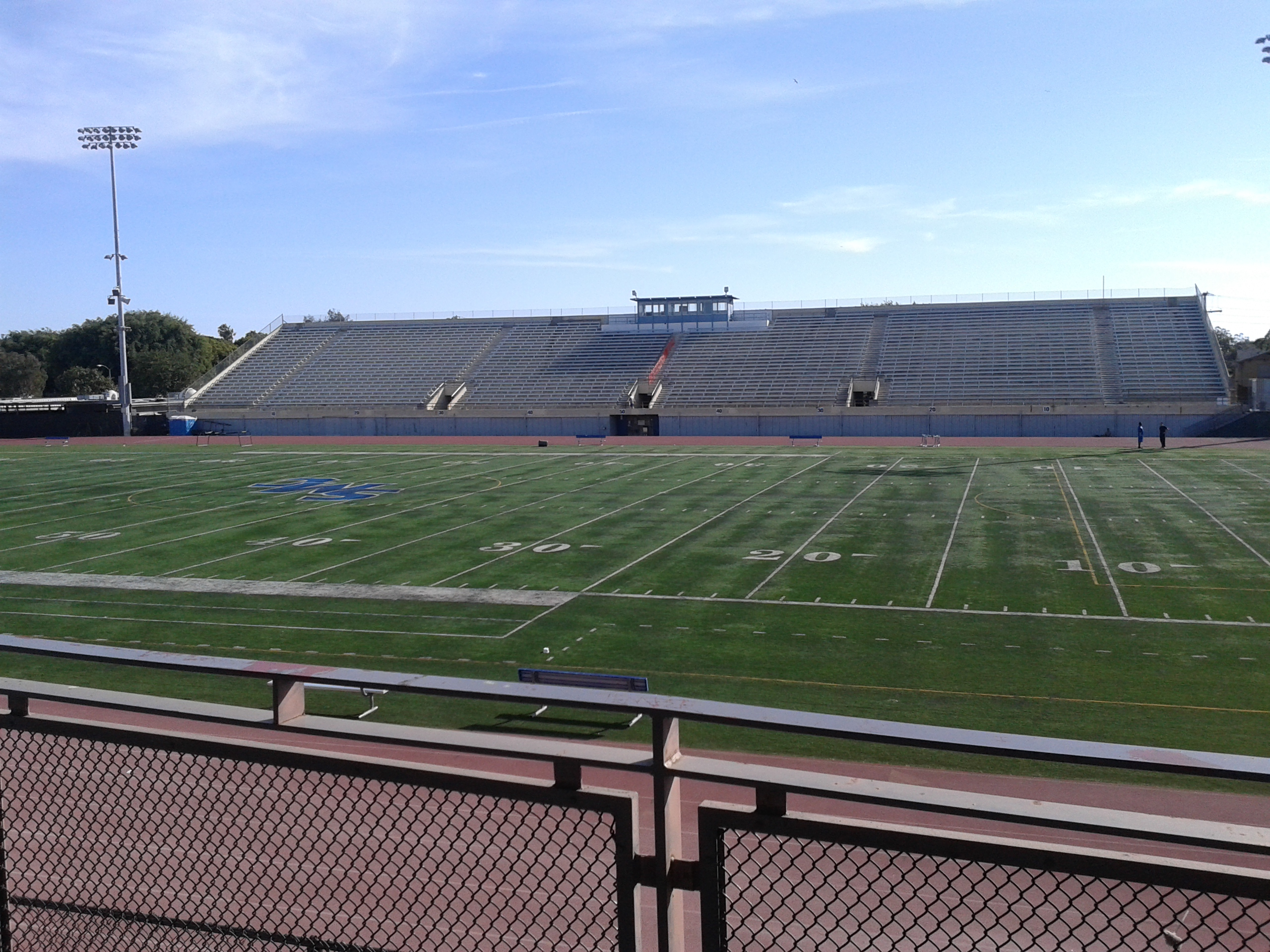
- Corsair Field; May 1, 2014 4:51pm PST
- Interactive map of Corsair Field
- Location: 1900 Pico Blvd; Santa Monica, CA 90405
- Coordinates: 34°00′55″N 118°28′18″W
- Owner: Santa Monica College
- Capacity: ~6,600

Construction
- Opened: 1952

Tenants
- SMC Corsairs (1952-present), 1984 Summer Olympics-Marathon (1984)

Corsair Field is an artificial turf stadium in the main campus of Santa Monica College.

== Details ==
Corsair Field opened with the expansion of the campus to its current site in the early 1950s. It is the site of Santa Monica College events and many local high school and track & field events. The all-weather track was installed in 1984. in 2008 the SMC corsair Field was fully renovated.

Corsair Field is located near the intersection of Pearl and 16th Streets in Santa Monica. It's less than a half-mile south of the Santa Monica 10 Freeway. and less than 2 miles east of the Santa Monica Pier and Pacific Ocean.

The field is artificial turf and there is an all-weather track surrounding the field. There is lighting for night use.

The SMC Pavilion, a hardwood-floor gymnasium (capacity 1,200), is attached to the east-side stands and houses locker rooms for both home and visiting teams, plus rooms for officials. There is also a weight- training facility and meeting rooms.

Spectator amenities include 1,000 parking spaces adjacent to the stadium, three ticket booths with eight windows and an electronic scoreboard. There is a small press box atop the west grandstand.

== 1984 Olympics ==
Corsair Field was the starting point of the 1984 Olympic marathons. the Women's marathon began August 8, 1984 at 8:00am PST local time. and the men's Olympic Marathon began August 12, 1984 at 5:00pm PST local time. the marathoners finish point was the Los Angeles Memorial Coliseum. Joan Benoit from the United States and Carlos Lopes from Portugal were the gold medal winners. the women's marathon was the first time in Olympic History there was a woman's Olympic Marathon.
