= Santa Monica College =

Community college in Santa Monica, California

- Former names: Santa Monica Junior College (1929–1945); Santa Monica City College (1945–1970)
- Motto: Humanitas; Veritas; Munus; (Latin)
- Motto in English: Friendliness; Truth; Service
- Type: Public community college
- Established: 1929; 97 years ago
- Academic affiliations: CCCS; ACCJC
- Budget: $559.2 million (2021–2022)
- President: Kathryn Jeffery
- Faculty: 2,023
- Students: 39,097 (2024-2025 Annual)
- Location: Santa Monica, California, U.S. 34.0168°N 118.4707°W
- Campus: Urban 38 acres (15 ha)
- Newspaper: The Corsair
- Colors: Blue and white
- Nickname: Corsairs
- Sporting affiliations: CCCAA – WSC, SCFA (football)
- Mascot: Pico the Corsair
- Website: smc.edu

Santa Monica College (SMC) is a public community college in Santa Monica, California. Founded as a junior college in 1929, SMC enrolls over 30,000 students in more than 90 fields of study. The college initially served pre-college high school students, eventually expanding its enrollment to educate college-age and non-traditional students with the intention to transfer to a four-year university. The college has high transfer rates to four-year universities, such as the University of California and California State University campuses, being a leader among state community colleges in transfers to the former.

== History ==
=== 20th century ===
Santa Monica Junior College was established in September 1929 with seven faculty members and 153 students in classes held on the second floor of Santa Monica High School. Attended primarily by high school students, it was originally part of the Santa Monica-Malibu Unified School District. Despite the ensuing Wall Street Crash of 1929 and Great Depression, the school's enrollment increased to 355 in 1930 and 600 in 1931. In 1932, the college moved to the vacant brick Garfield Elementary School building on Michigan Avenue. The building was declared unsafe following the 1933 Long Beach earthquake and classes moved to tents and bungalows on the Garfield site, which students nicknamed Splinterville.

In 1940, following a number of failed attempts to relocate to a larger property, the school purchased 6.18 acres (2.50 ha) on Pico Boulevard for $10,197. In 1945, the junior college changed its name to Santa Monica City College. The Pico Boulevard and 17th Street campus opened on January 18, 1952, to 1,200 students. The college's first bond measure was passed in 1946 for the construction of Corsair Stadium, which began in 1946 and was completed in 1948. In 1969, the college secured its own governing board under the creation of the Santa Monica Junior College District. In 1970, the school changed its name from Santa Monica City College to Santa Monica College.

==== Financial crisis ====
Santa Monica College experienced a financial crisis in 1972 when the state of California changed the age of majority from 21 to 18. Since the state paid $40 more per unit of attendance of minors than adults, the change cut SMC's budget in half. Additionally, state funding for community college students in California went to the student's home district and not the college's district. SMC had a contract with the City of Los Angeles to finance students from Los Angeles but since one-third of SMC students were from districts outside of Los Angeles the city would lose even more funding. As a result, Los Angeles planned to cancel its financial compensation contract with SMC. The college consequently sent termination letters to all faculty and staff, effective September 1972. The crisis was halted on March 8, 1972, when the California State Senate passed a bill temporarily exempting community colleges from the financial effects of the change in the age of adulthood. On March 21, 1972, the college renegotiated its contract with the City of Los Angeles and rehired its faculty and staff.

In 1980, the college built a new library and transformed the previous library building into the Letters and Science Building.

=== 21st century ===
In 2012 Santa Monica College received national attention due to a controversial plan to create a two-tier system of education in which more "popular" courses would be offered at higher costs. Protests at a board meeting immediately following the plan's proposal led to several students being pepper sprayed. A report on the event resulted in an officer's dismissal. The report also faulted several members of the protest for provoking officers. Some people exclaimed "We got pepper sprayed! We won" after the incident.

==== 2013 shooting ====
On June 7, 2013, a killing spree occurred in Santa Monica that left a total of five people dead, including the gunman, and injured five others. The incident started several miles off-campus before the gunman traveled to SMC and entered the college's library, where he was later fatally shot by police. School officials put the campus on lockdown as Los Angeles Police Department officers, including SWAT, cleared the campus. Local law enforcement stated that they did not view the incident as a "school shooting" because the incident started off-campus.

The motive was inconclusive.

==== 2024 shooting ====
On October 14, 2024, a shooting occurred at the Santa Monica College Center for Media and Design, where a custodial operations manager, Felicia Hudson, was critically injured. The incident took place just before 10:00 p.m., leading to her immediate hospitalization. She succumbed to her injuries and died two days later, on October 16. The shooting has been classified as a case of workplace violence, with the suspect identified as Davon Durell Dean, also an SMC employee. The motive was unclear. After an extensive manhunt, Dean was found deceased in his vehicle in Hawthorne, having died from a self-inflicted gunshot wound. The college closed all campuses for the remainder of the week to prioritize safety and support for the community. Classes resumed and the campus reopened again on Monday, October 21.

== Organization and governance ==
Santa Monica College is the only college of the Santa Monica Community College District, a constituent community college district of the California Community Colleges System (CCCS). The district is governed by its seven-member board of trustees and its officers including the Superintendent/President. The district territory includes Santa Monica and Malibu.

The trustees are elected at-large from registered voters within the district for four years. A student trustee also participates in board meetings as a non-voting member and is elected by the students for one year. The board appoints and supervises the superintendent/president and sets district policy.

The Superintendent of the Santa Monica Community College District/President of Santa Monica College has delegated authority to set rules and regulations for the district and Santa Monica College. The superintendent/president is accountable to the board, and all other officers are accountable to the superintendent/president.

The board of trustees includes a student trustee in accordance with board policy BP 2015. The student trustee is elected and removed in accordance with the constitution and by-laws of the Associated Students of Santa Monica College.

== Campus ==
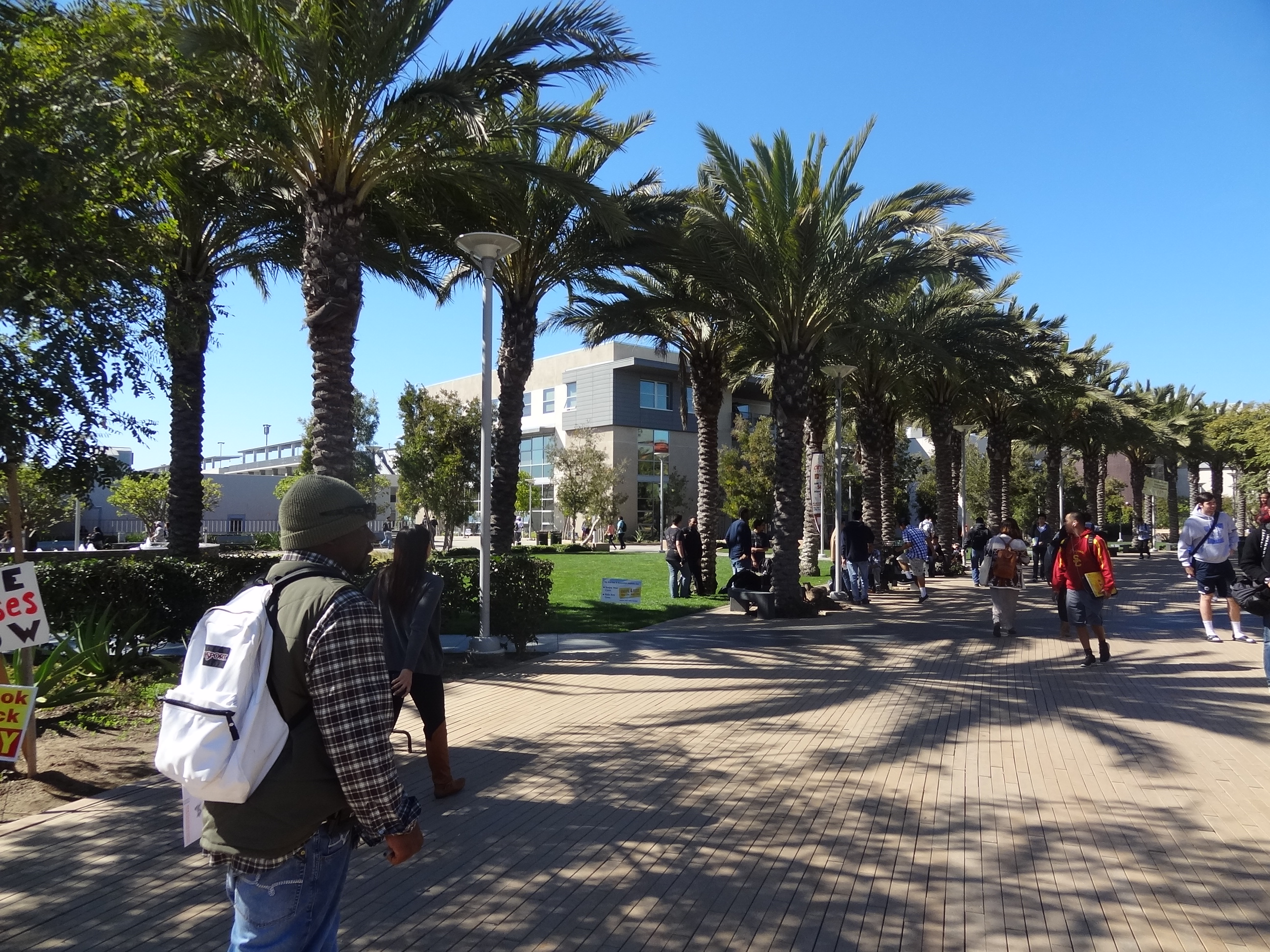
SMC Quad with the Humanities and Social Sciences (HSS) building in the background

SMC's main campus is located at 1900 Pico Boulevard and is the college's largest location. The college operates six satellite campuses across Santa Monica and Malibu:

- Bundy Campus, 3171 S. Bundy Dr.
- SMC Performing Arts Center & Music Academy, Santa Monica Boulevard at 11th Street
- Center for Media and Design, 1660 Stewart St.
- Emeritus College, 1227 Second St.
- Airport Campus, 2800 Airport Ave
- Malibu Campus, 23555 Civic Center Way (Malibu)

== Academics ==
Santa Monica College is accredited by the Accrediting Commission for Community and Junior Colleges (ACCJC). It offers a variety of occupational certificate programs, including accounting, fashion design, office information systems, and the Academy of Entertainment Technology (which offers certificates in interactive media and animation). The college also offers logistics and supply chain programs at AAS and certificate level. The Santa Monica College Arts Mentor Program provides certain students in the fine and applied arts with graduate-level training by professionals in their specialized fields.

== Athletics ==
Pico the Corsair at Homecoming 2010

Santa Monica College fields 18 sports, eight men's teams and competes as a member of the California Community College Athletic Association (CCCAA) in the Western State Conference (WSC) for all sports except football, which competes in Southern California Football Association (SCFA). The mascot for SMC is Pico the Corsair. Pico the Corsair derives his name from Pico Boulevard, one of the four main streets which form the exterior perimeter of the campus. He sails on the ship the Lady Sixteen with his pet Pearl the Parrot while carrying his Sword of Silberkraus. The Lady Sixteen and Pearl are named after 16th Street and Pearl Street respectively.

SMC fields both men's and women's teams in basketball, cross country, soccer, swimming, track and field, volleyball, and water polo. SMC fields men's teams in football, and women's beach volleyball, softball, and tennis teams.

Santa Monica College football played undefeated seasons in 1958, 1966, 1980, and 2015.

Santa Monica College won the Junior Rose Bowl, the unofficial National Championship, in 1958 against Northeastern Oklahoma A&M College on December 13, 1958.

Santa Monica College football was the conference champion for the years 2003, 2011, 2012, 2013, 2014, 2015 and 2025.

Corsair Field (4,850) built in 1948, is home to football and track and field. The field was the starting point for both the men's and women's marathon events for the 1984 Summer Olympics held in neighboring Los Angeles.

Corsair Pavilion (1,600) is home to men's and women's basketball and volleyball teams, as well as the Hollywood Fame of the American Basketball Association

The Santa Monica College men's volleyball team won the national intercollegiate volleyball championship each year from 1961 to 1966, except for 1965, when it lost the title to UCLA.

== Student life ==
Fall Demographics of student body
Ethnic Breakdown	2018	2015
Hispanic and Latino American	40%	39%
Black	9%	9.2%
Asian American	9%	15.7%
Native Hawaiian or other Pacific Islander	0%	N/A
White	26%	37.5%
Multiracial Americans	5%	N/A
International students	10%	11.2%
Unknown	1%	7.4%
Female	54%	N/A
Male	46%	N/A

In the fall of 2015, there were 33,964 students enrolled at SMC. Of these students:

- 37.4% were full-time.
- 62.6% were part-time.
- 52.8% were women.
- 47.2% were men.

The average age was 24.1 years.

- 19 and younger: 30.7%
- 20 to 24: 41.2%
- 25 to 29: 12.8%
- 30 to 39: 8.7%
- 40 to 49: 3.5%
- 50 and older: 3.1%

Santa Monica College is the home of KCRW (89.9 FM), a public radio station, broadcasting throughout the Los Angeles and Orange County area with an estimated 450,000 listeners. The station is the broadcast home of Morning Becomes Eclectic.

As part of its hands-on media curriculum, the college produces its own weekly, student-run newspaper (both in print, and online) called The Corsair. The newspaper began as The SaMoJaC and was published every two weeks before being renamed The Corsair in 1945. As part of the college's academic curriculum, publication of The Corsair also provides experience as a hands-on training vehicle for Southern California journalism students.

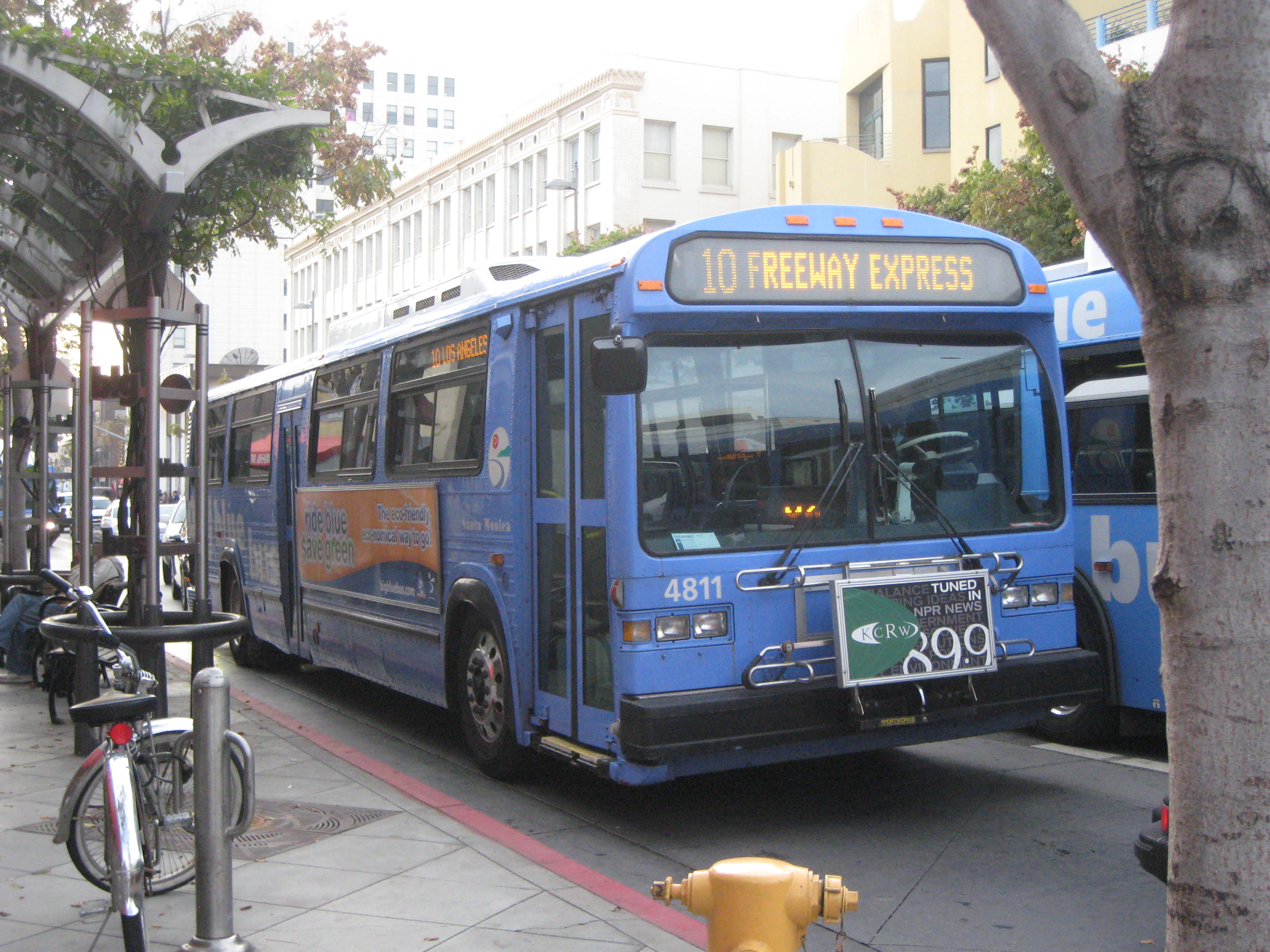
Big Blue Bus Line 10 departing Santa Monica

SMC students have established a student body association named Associated Students of Santa Monica College (AS). The association is required by law to "encourage students to participate in the governance of the college". SMC's Associated Students is a member of the Student Senate for California Community Colleges, a statewide community college student advocacy organization. The statewide Student Senate is authorized by law "to advocate before the Legislature and other state and local governmental entities".

SMC students who pay the $19.50 Associated Students fee at registration have unlimited access to the Big Blue Bus lines across Santa Monica and its adjacent neighborhoods, including a line on Lincoln Boulevard that accesses Los Angeles International Airport (LAX).

== Notable alumni ==
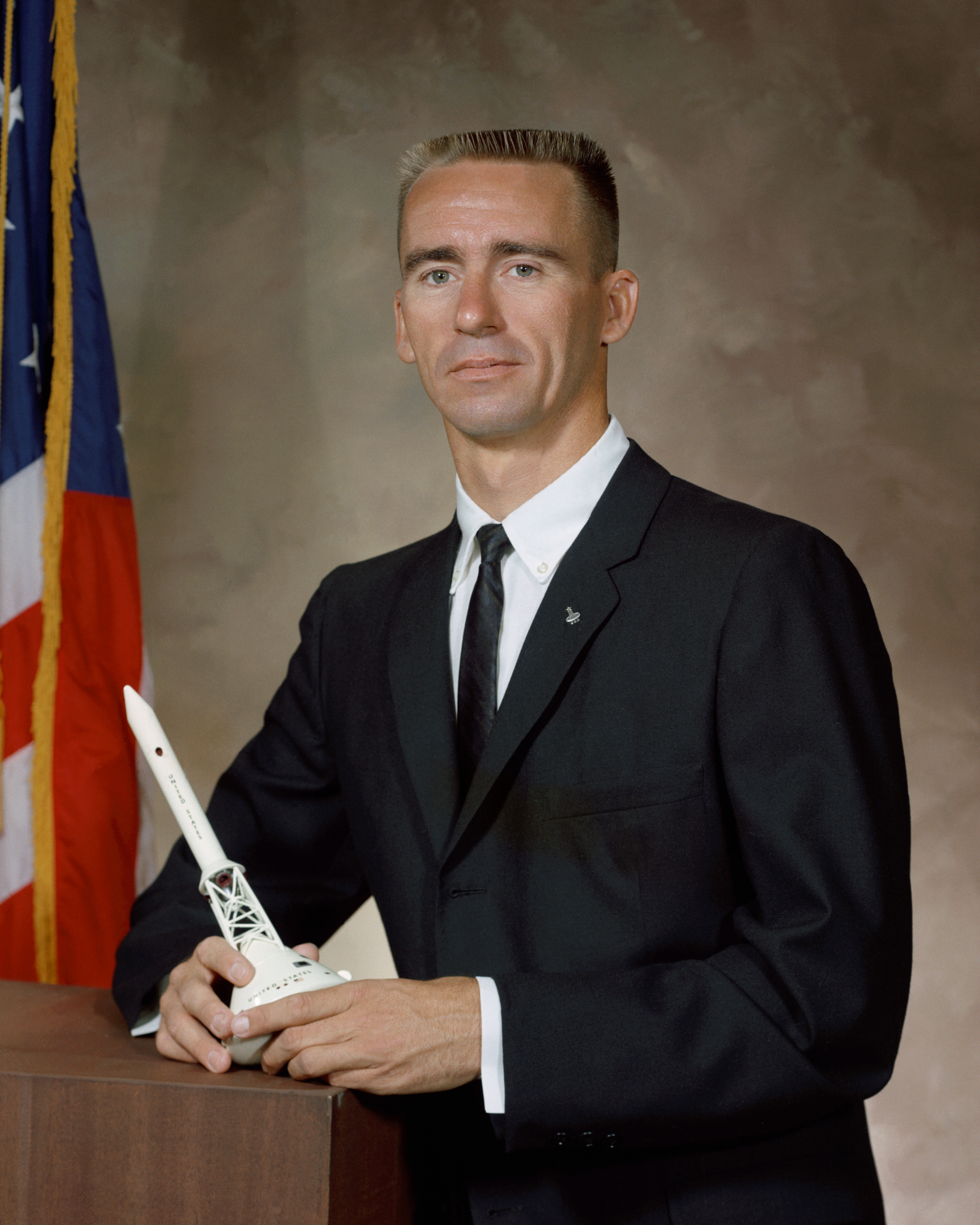
Walter Cunningham

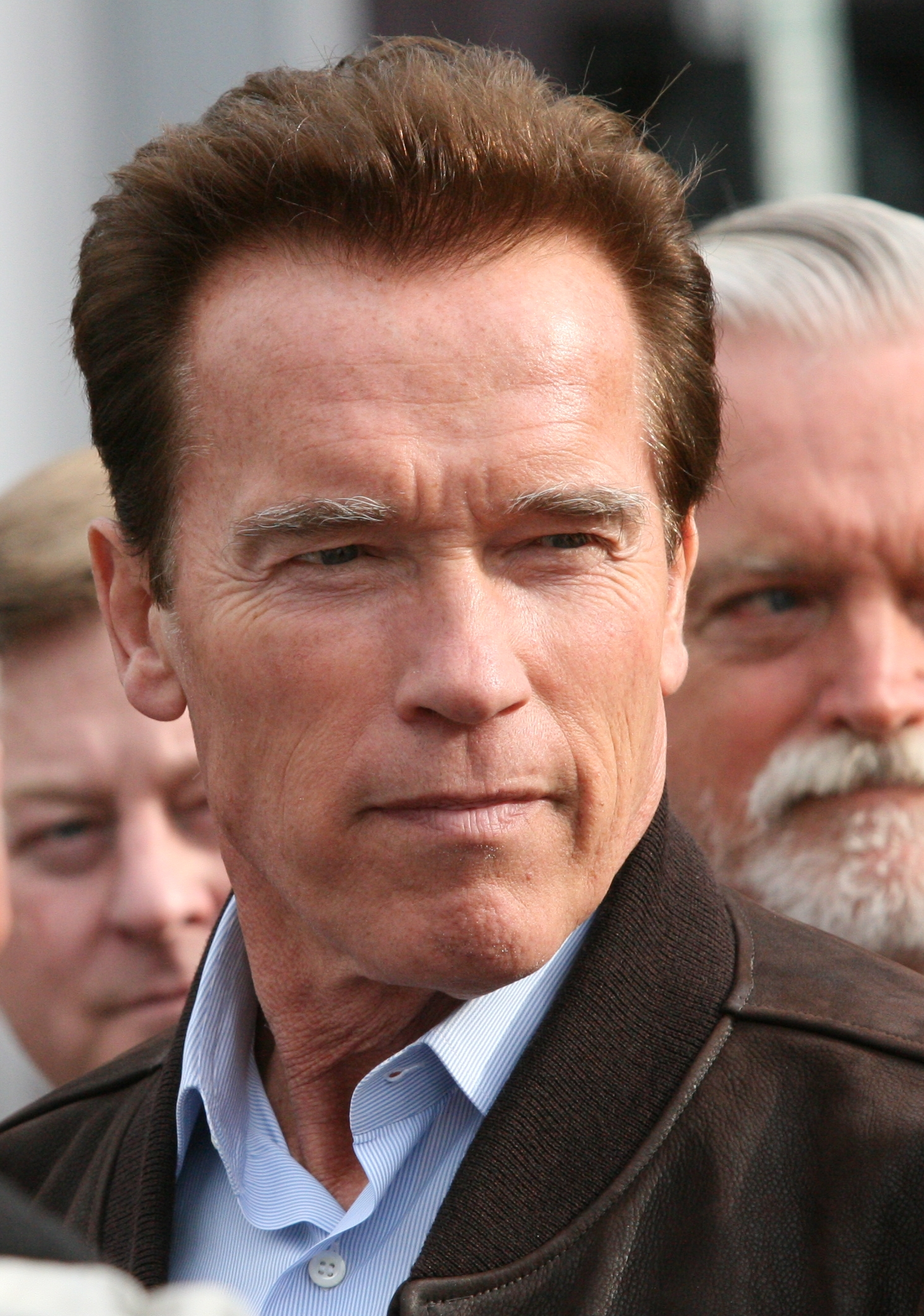
Arnold Schwarzenegger

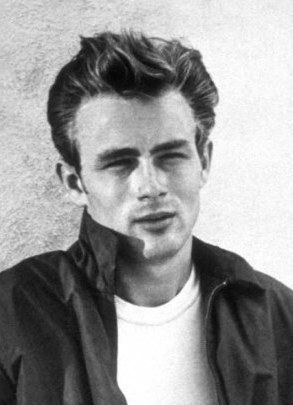
James Dean

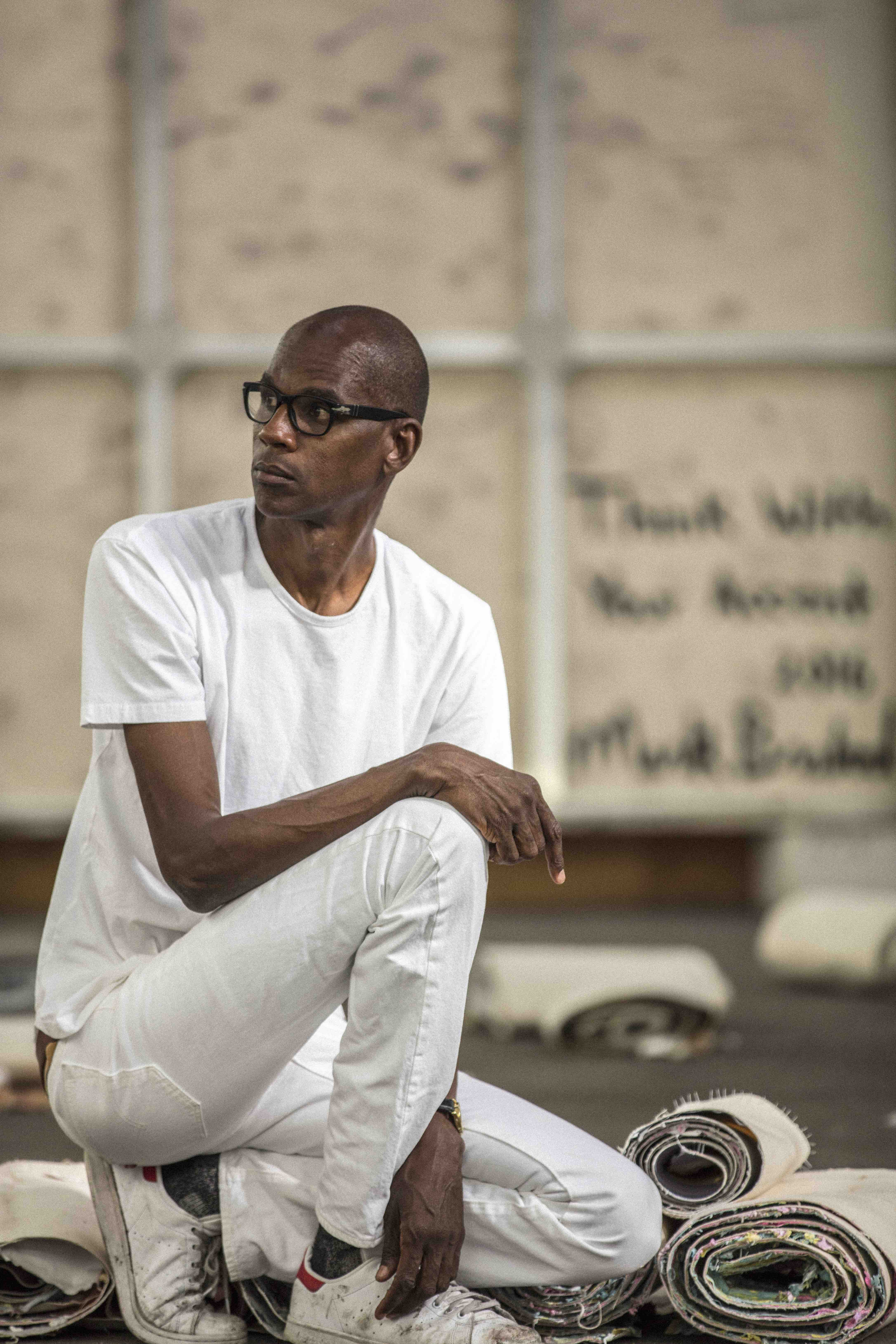
Mark Bradford

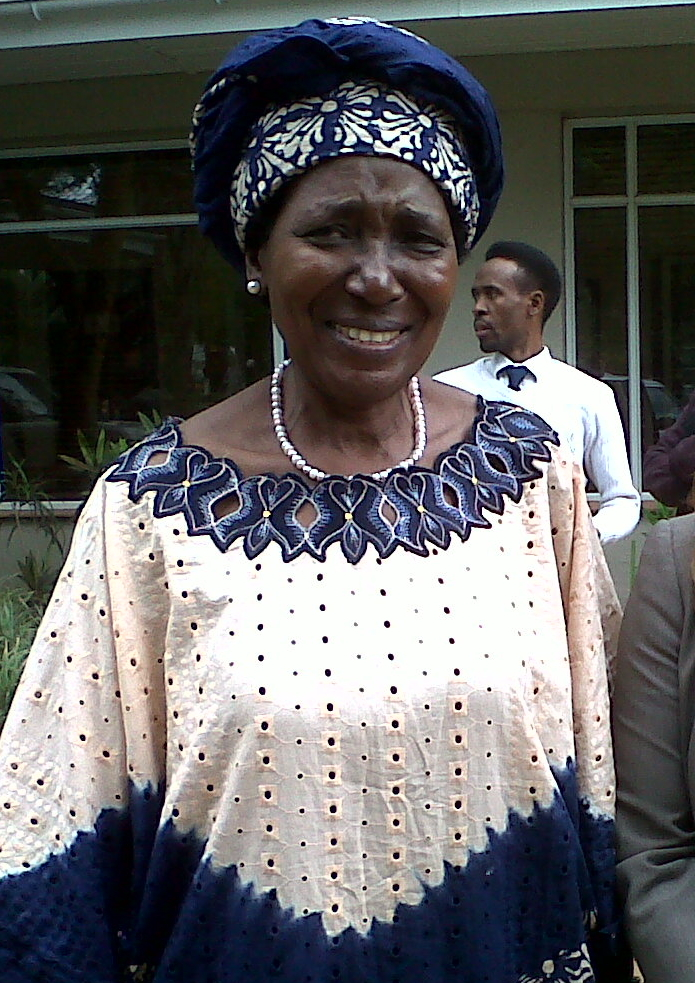
Inonge Wina

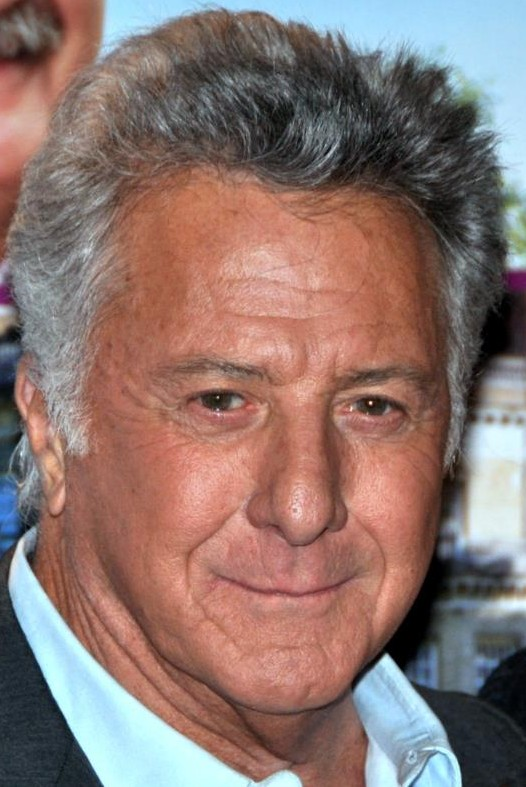
Dustin Hoffman

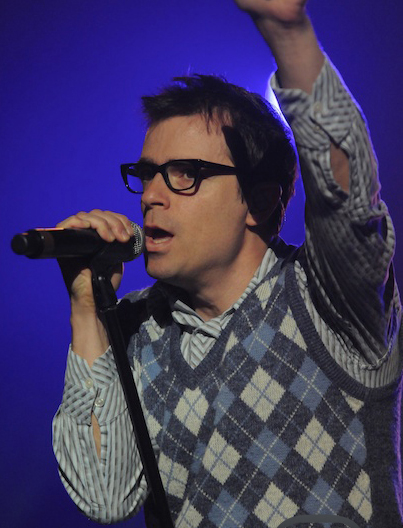
Rivers Cuomo

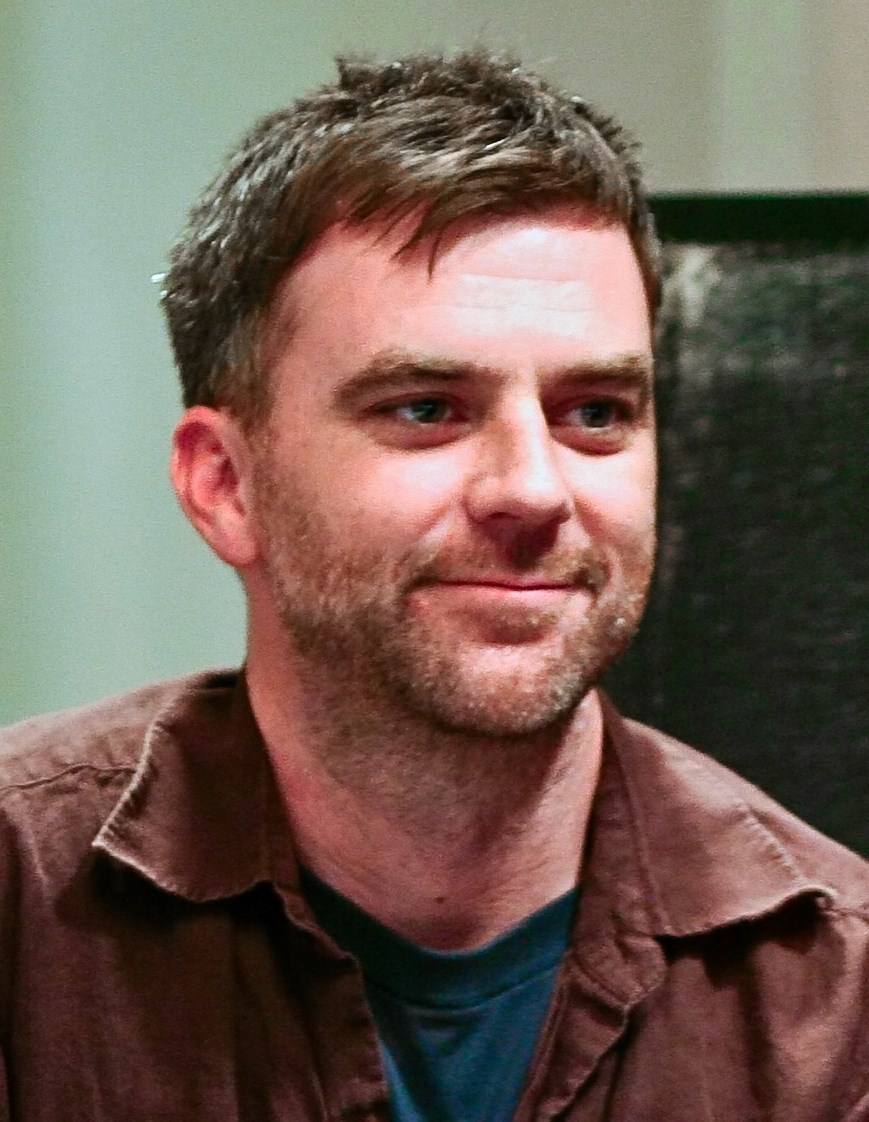
Paul Thomas Anderson

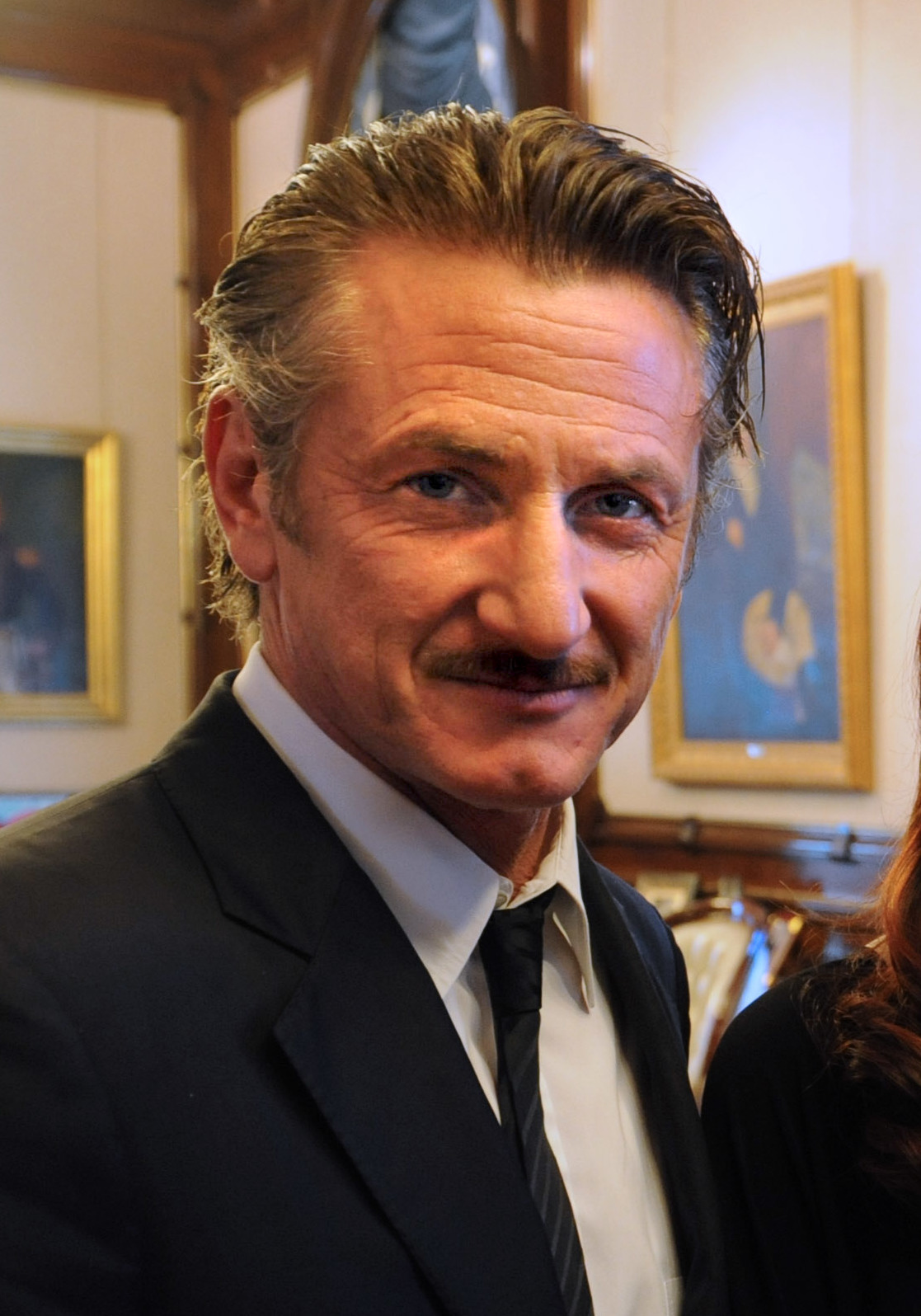
Sean Penn

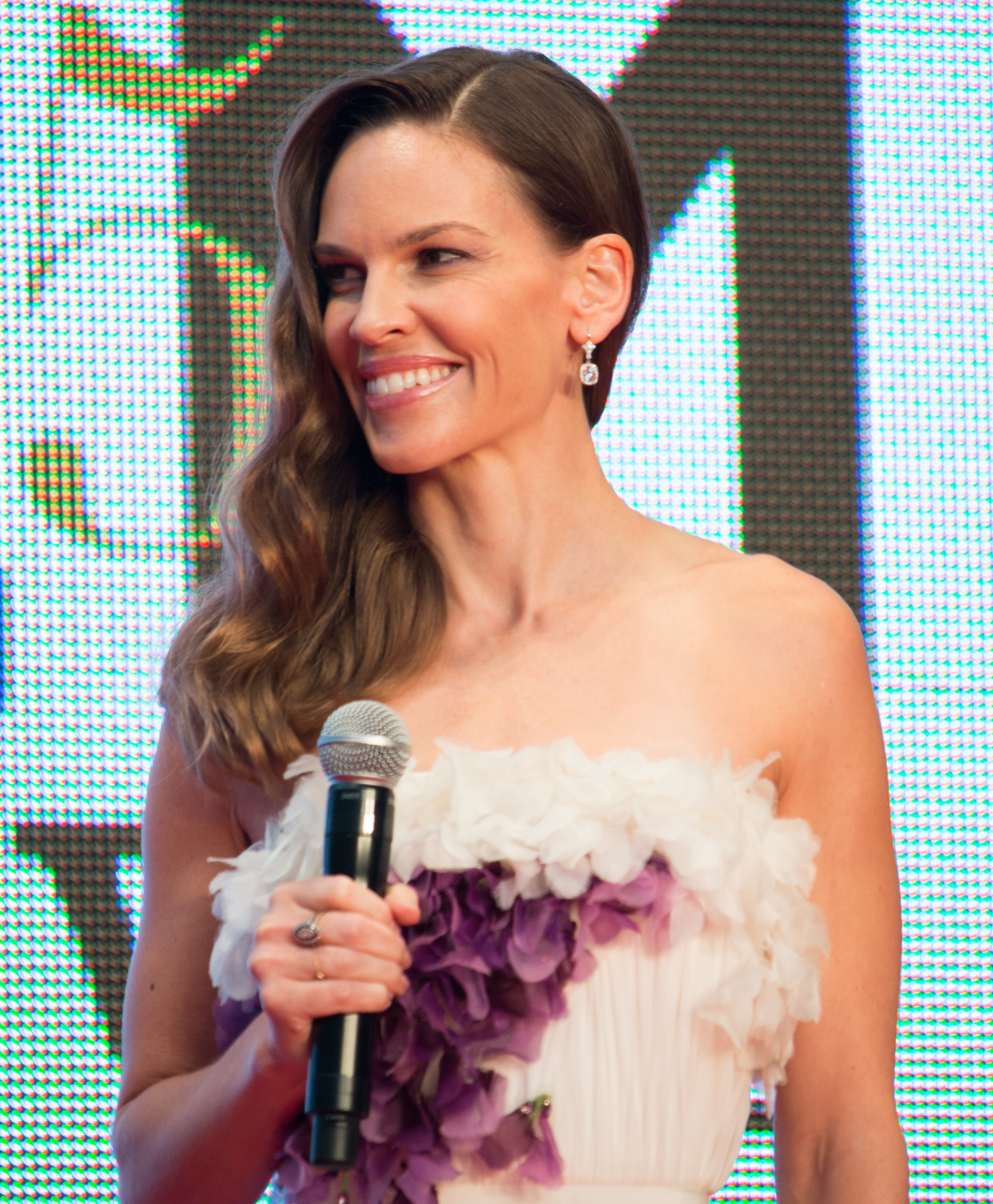
Hilary Swank

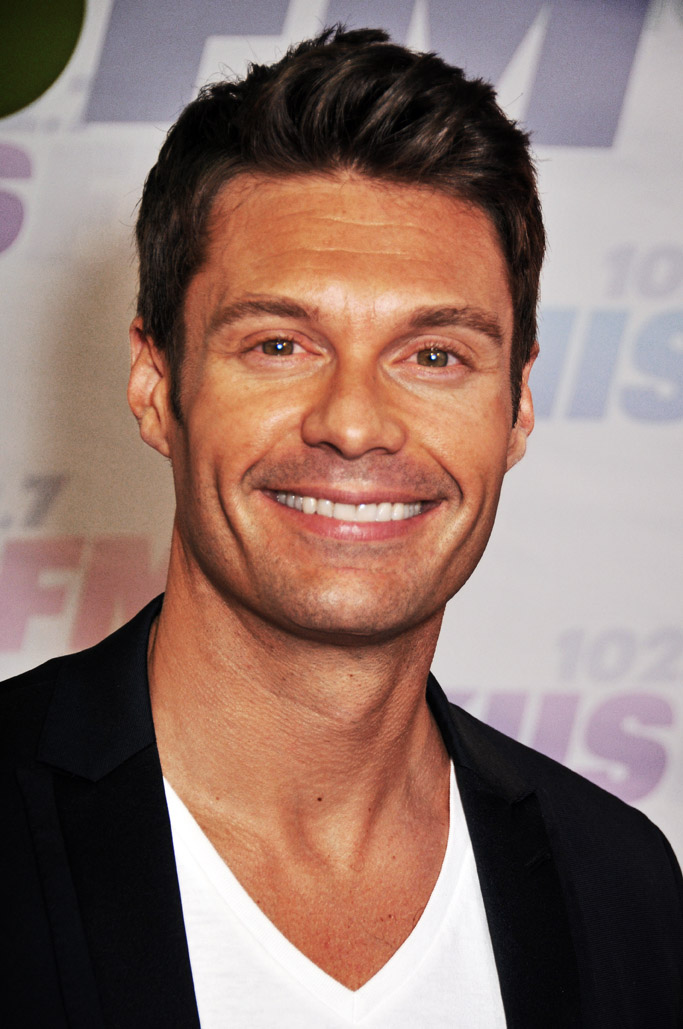
Ryan Seacrest

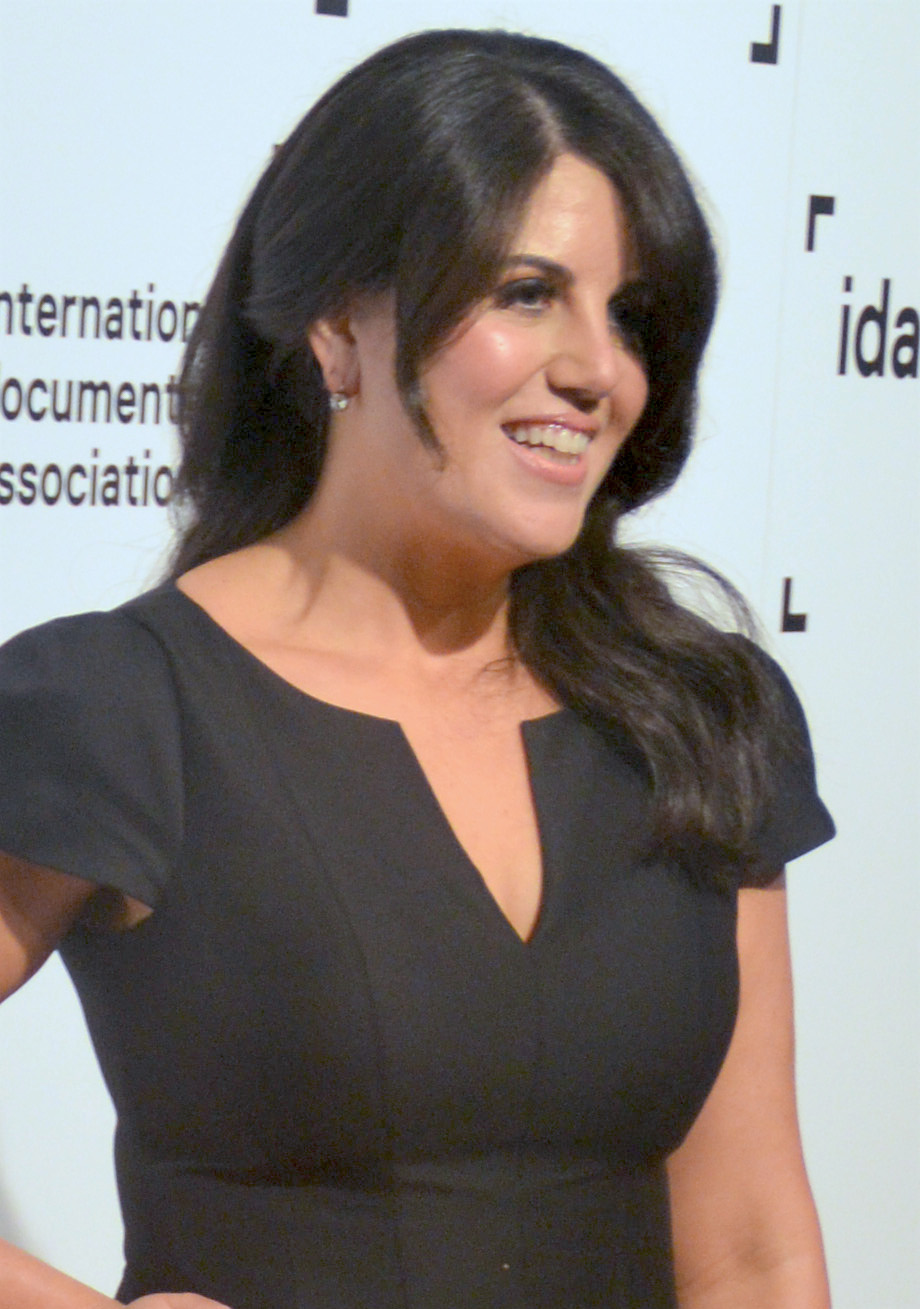
Monica Lewinsky

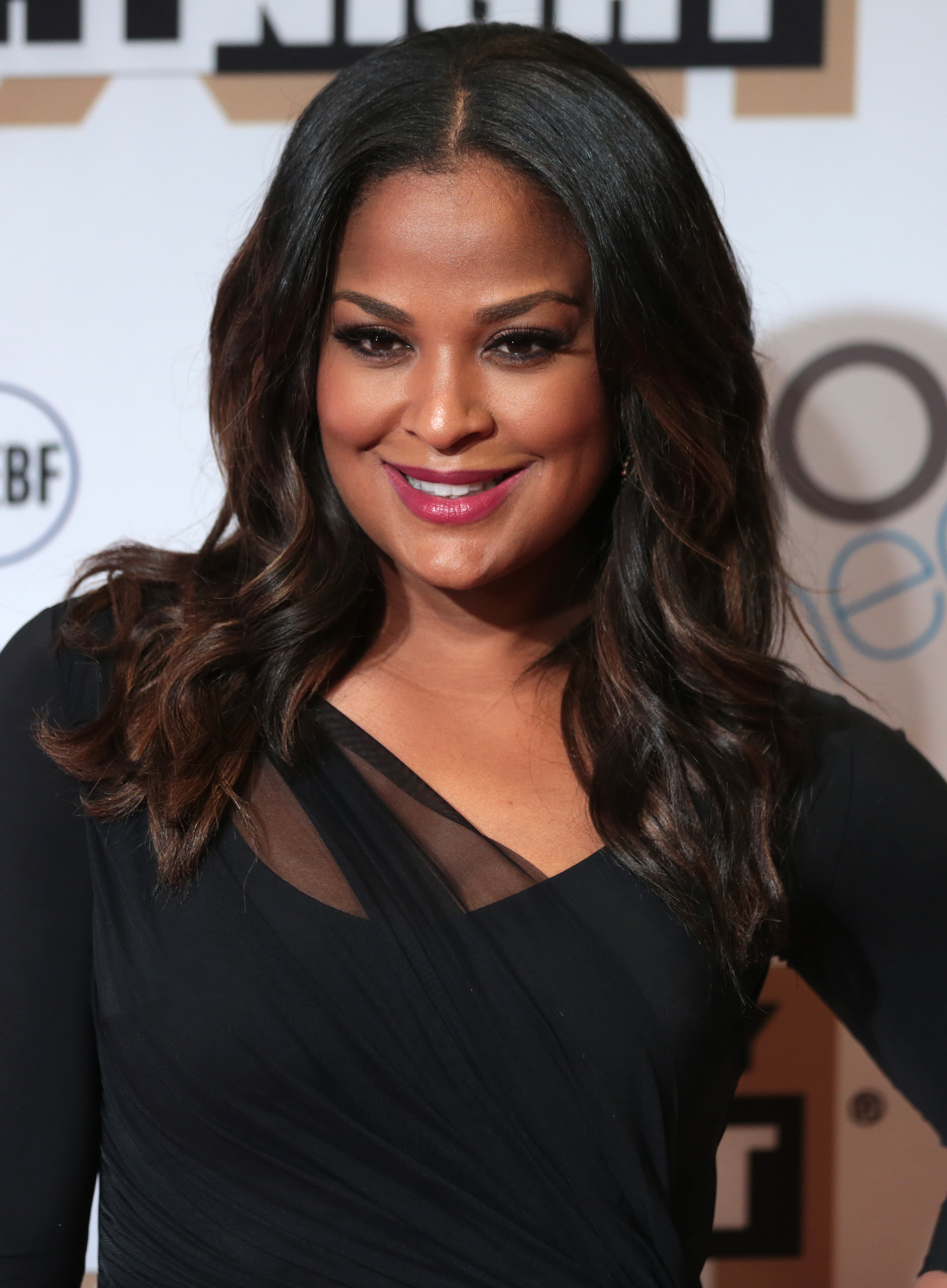
Laila Ali

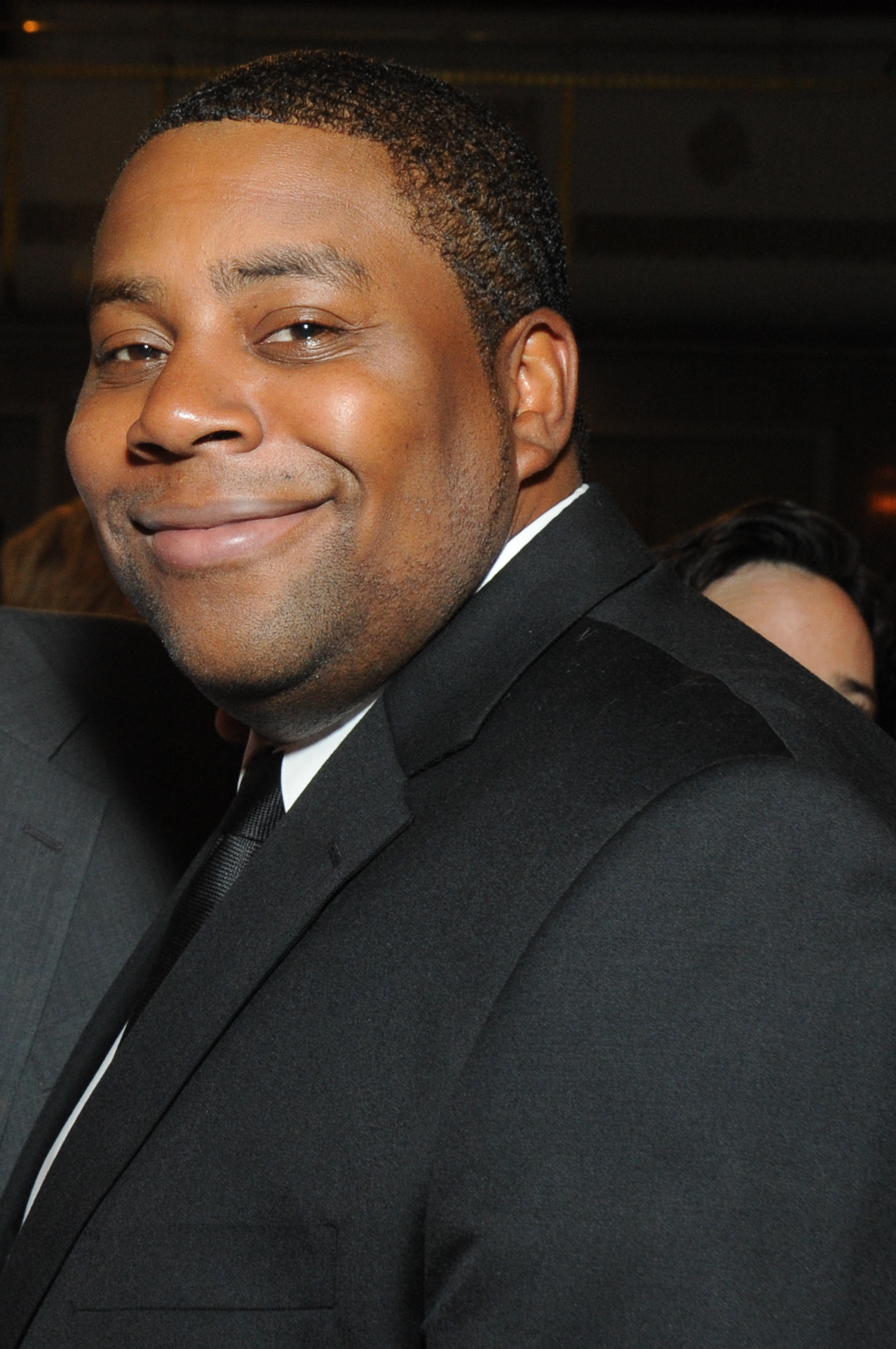
Kenan Thompson (attended)

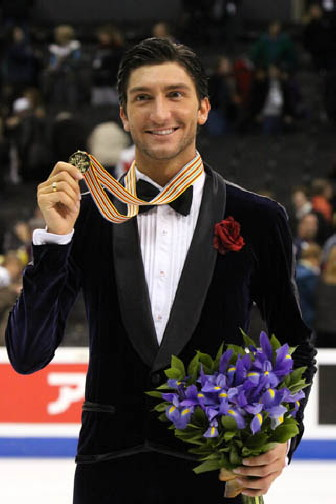
Evan Lysacek

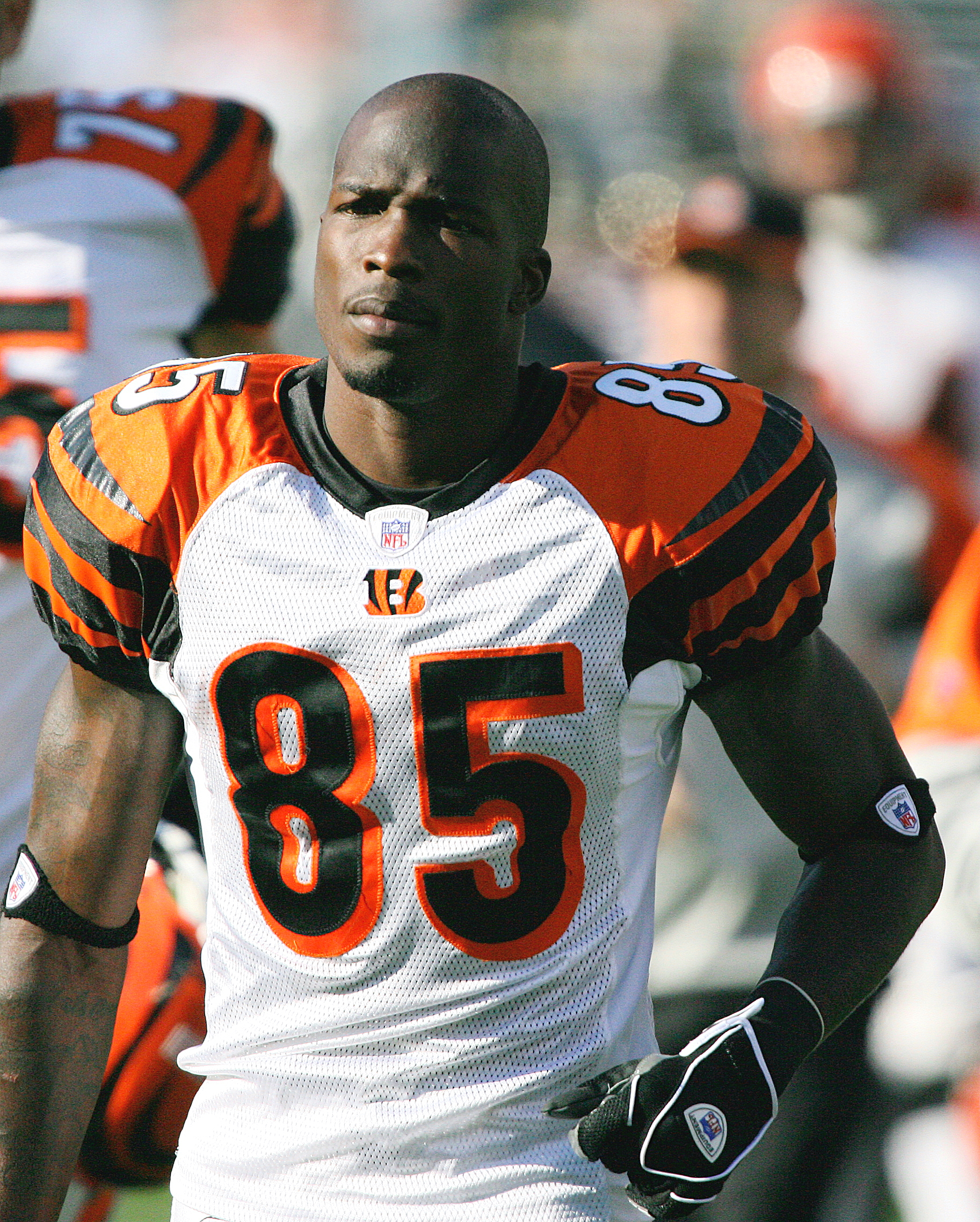
Chad Johnson

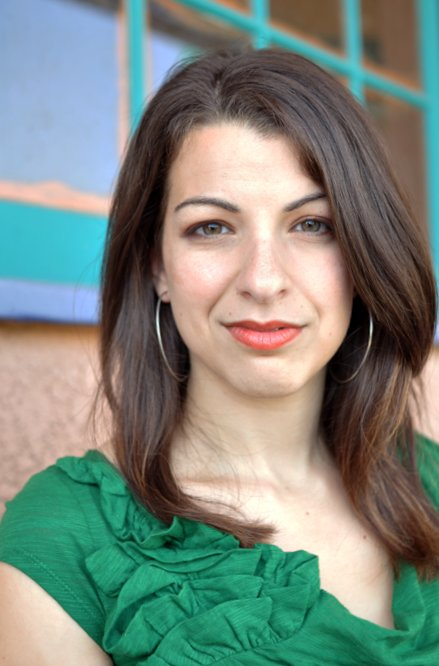
Anita Sarkeesian

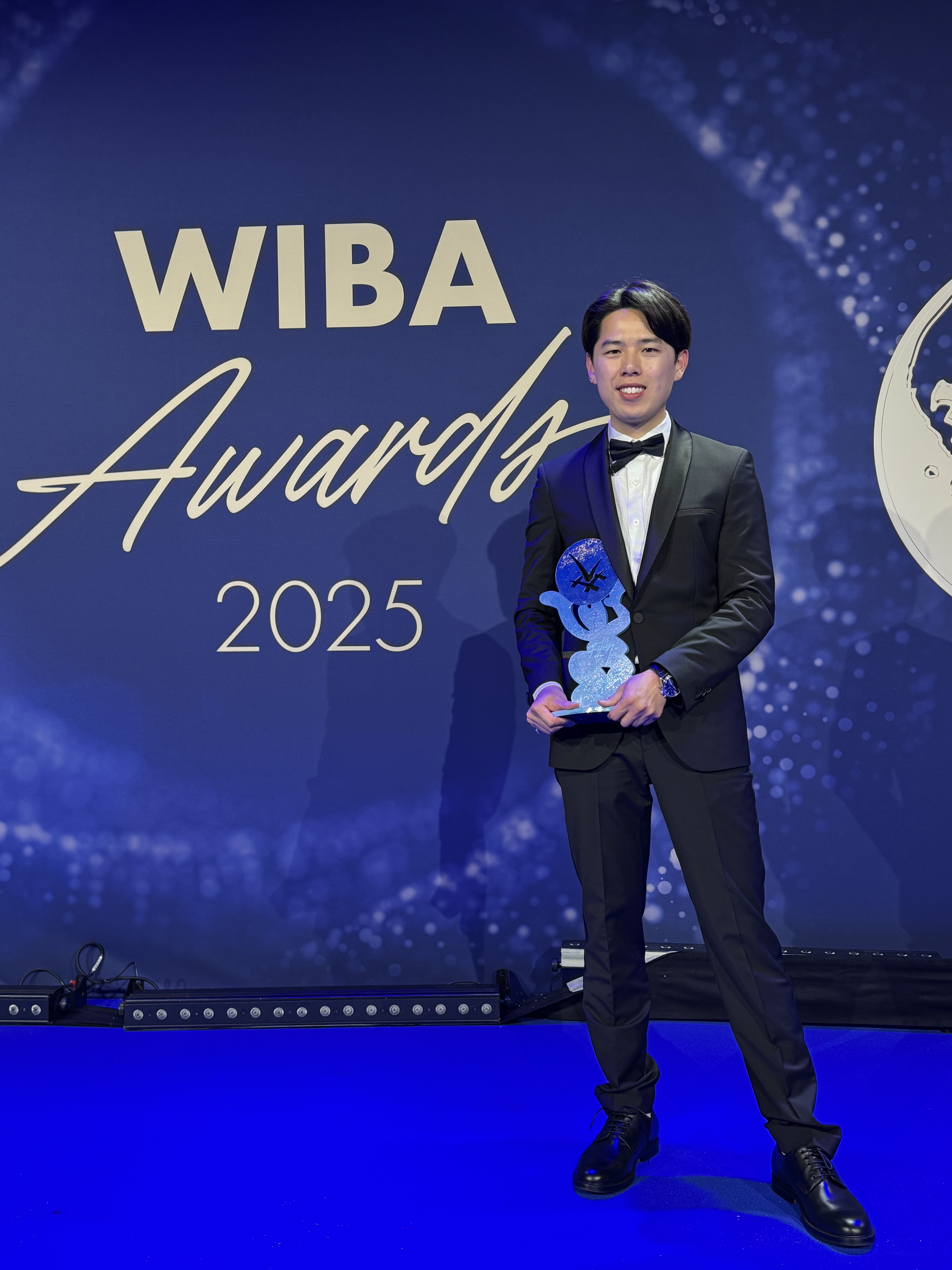
PANDA BOI
