= Hennepin Technical College =

Public college near Minneapolis, Minnesota, US

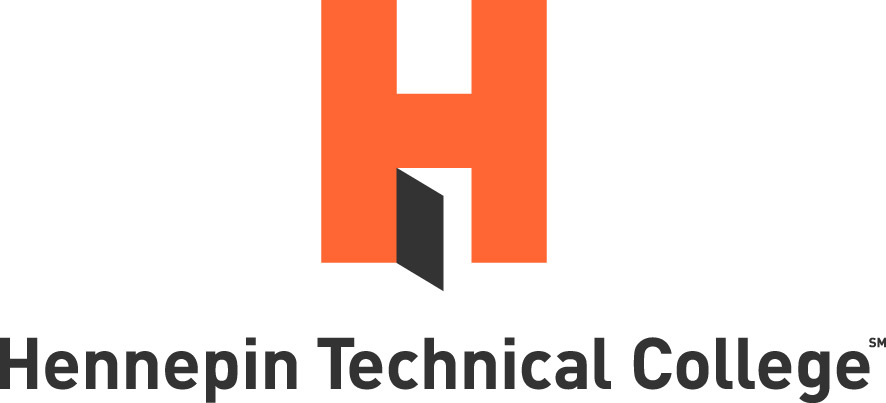
- Type: Public, two-year technical college
- Established: 1972
- Affiliations: MnSCU, ICCAC
- President: Joy Bodin
- Students: 6,296
- Undergraduates: 6,296
- Location: Brooklyn Park 45.0966478°N 93.3970926°W; Eden Prairie 44.8353217°N 93.4436244°W, Minnesota, United States
- Campus: Suburban
- Colors: Orange & Gray
- Website: Official website

Hennepin Technical College is a public technical school with two campuses in suburban Minneapolis, Minnesota.

== History ==
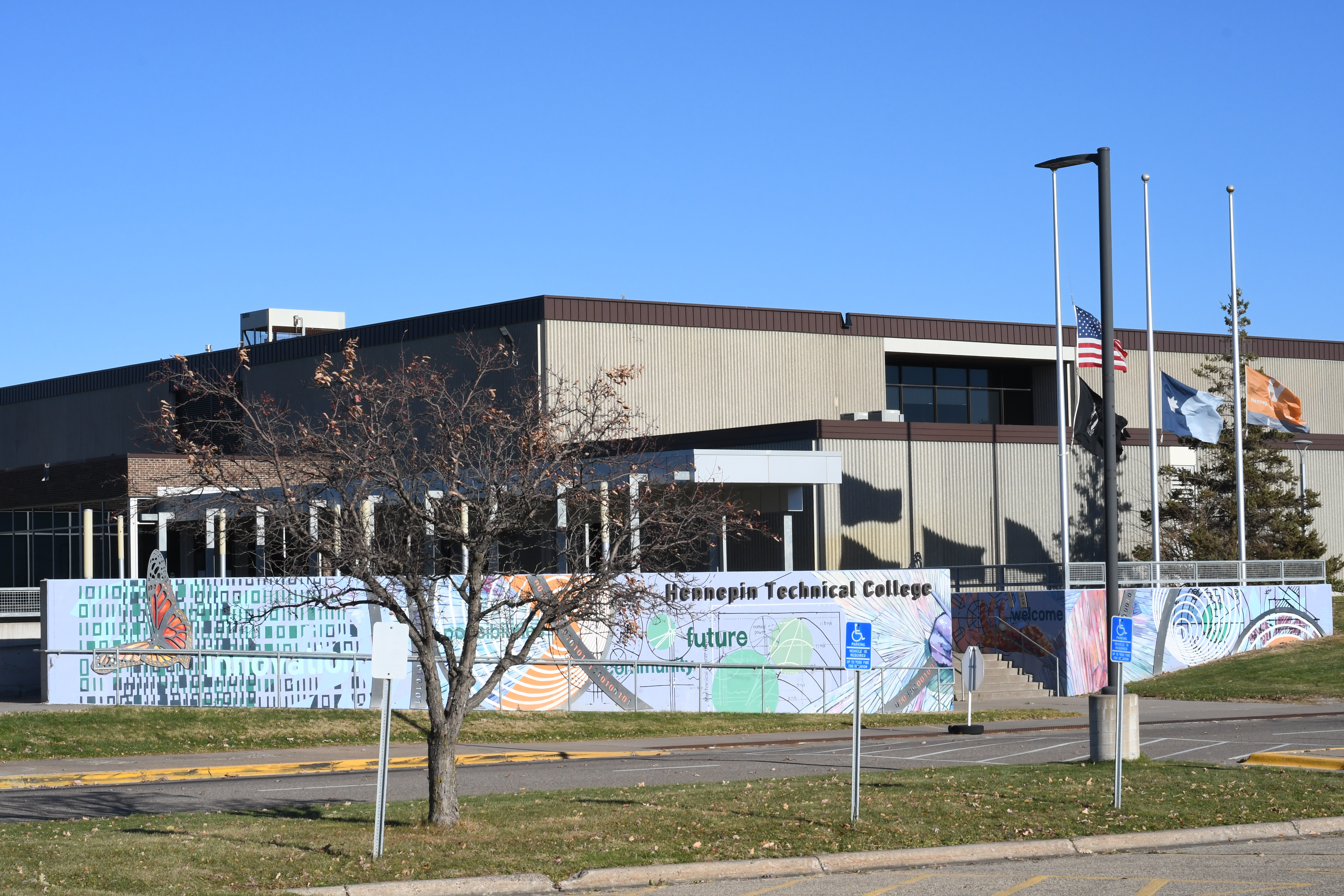
Brooklyn Park campus entrance

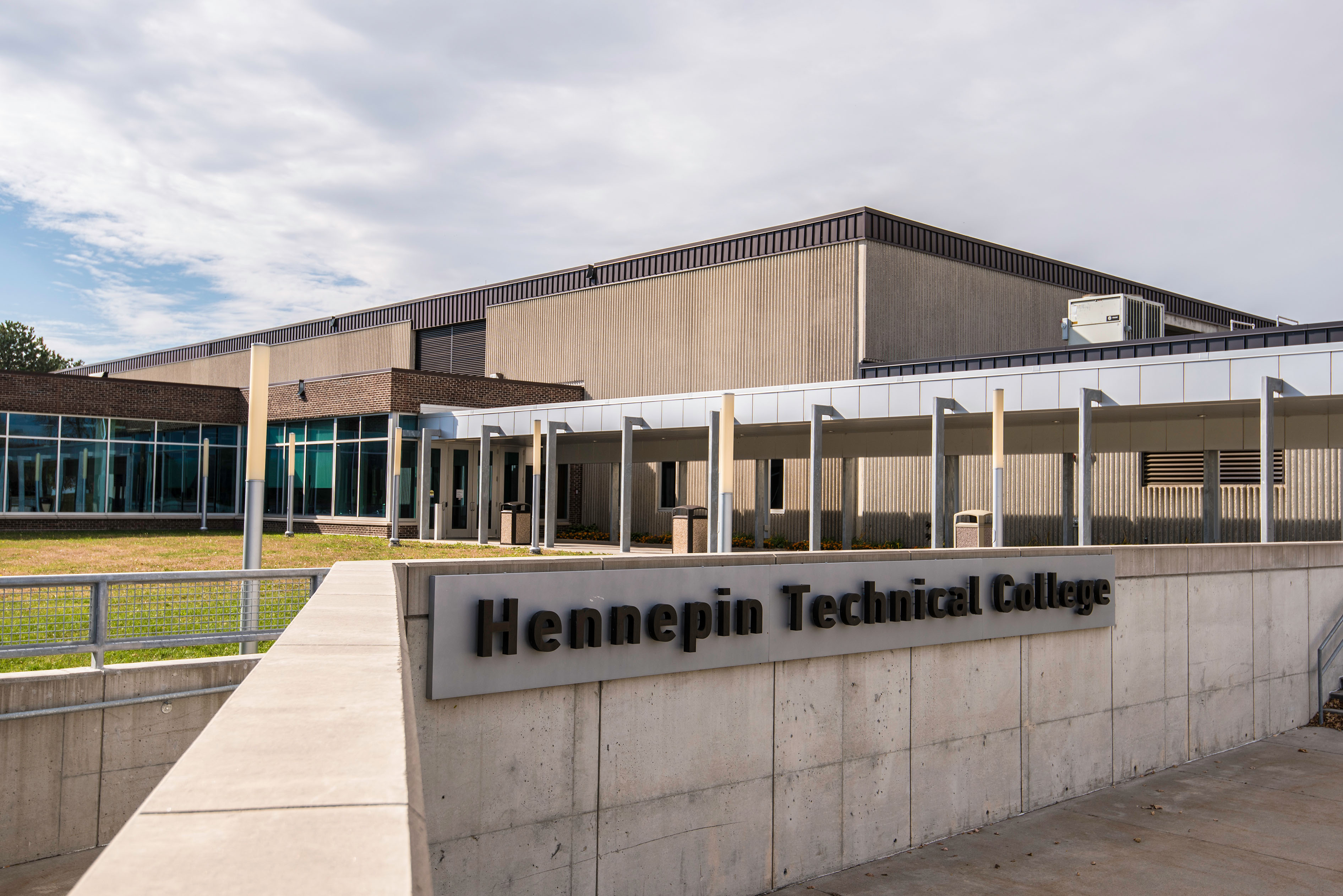
Eden Prairie campus entrance

Beginning in 1967, Twin Cities suburban school districts began advocating at the Minnesota Legislature for legislation that would create post-secondary vocational schools in rapidly growing suburban districts. In 1968, legislation passed which enabled the formation of a cooperative organization structure for vocational technical education among all of the independent school districts in suburban Hennepin County, known as Independent School District 287.

Construction on two campuses began in 1970, and the Suburban Hennepin County Area Vocational-Technical Centers in Brooklyn Park and Eden Prairie opened at temporary sites in 1972. A site in Medina for a third campus was later sold.

They became known as the Hennepin Technical Centers in 1978, and then Hennepin Technical Institute in 1987. The school became known by its current name, Hennepin Technical College, in 1989.

In 1995, Hennepin Technical College joined the Minnesota State Colleges and Universities system.

== Academics ==
The college awards Associate of Science and Associate in Applied Sciences degrees in addition to diplomas and certificates. Hennepin Technical College also works closely with community partners to provide customized training in areas such as culinary arts and fire protection.

== Campus life ==
There are a few student clubs and organizations that are active and sponsored by Hennepin Technical College, including Phi Theta Kappa, Pangea Multicultural Club, Student Life Board, SkillsUSA, Veteran Student Club, Gay-Straight Alliance, the HTC Student Senate, and eSports Gaming Club.
